= Joseph Baker =

Joseph or Joe Baker may refer to:

- Joseph Baker (Royal Navy officer) (1767–1817), British naval officer
- Joseph Baker (pirate) (died 1800), Canadian pirate
- Joseph Baker (civil servant), English civil servant
- Joe Baker (marine scientist) (1932–2018), Australian marine scientist and rugby league player
- Joseph Baker (politician) (born 1959), member of the Vermont House of Representatives
- Joseph A. Baker (1883–1959), member of the Mississippi State Senate
- Joe Baker (1940–2003), England footballer
- Joe Baker (comedian) (1928–2001), English comedian and voice actor
- Joe Baker (footballer, born 1977), English footballer
- Joseph Allen Baker (1852–1918), British Member of Parliament for Finsbury East, 1905–19
- Joe Don Baker (1936–2025), American character actor
- Joseph M. Baker (1898–1928), U.S. Marine who won the Distinguished Service Cross in World War I
- Joe Baker, a member of the Baker family of characters from Resident Evil 7: Biohazard
- Joey Baker (born 2000), American college basketball player
- Joby Baker (born Joseph N. Baker, 1934), Canadian-born actor and painter

== See also ==
- Joe Baker-Cresswell (1901–1997), Royal Navy officer
- Jo Baker (disambiguation)
