= 2019–20 Duke Blue Devils men's basketball team =

American college basketball season

2019–20 Duke Blue Devils men's basketball

Empire Classic champion
- Conference: Atlantic Coast Conference

Ranking
- Coaches: No. 8
- AP: No. 11
- Record: 25–6 (15–5 ACC)
- Head coach: Mike Krzyzewski (40th season)
- Assistant coaches: Nate James; Jon Scheyer; Chris Carrawell
- Captains: Tre Jones; Jack White; Javin DeLaurier
- Home arena: Cameron Indoor Stadium

2019–20 ACC men's basketball standings
	Conf.				Overall
Team	W		L	PCT	W		L	PCT
No. 4 Florida State	16	–	4	.800	26	–	5	.839
No. 16 Virginia	15	–	5	.750	23	–	7	.767
No. 14 Louisville	15	–	5	.750	24	–	7	.774
No. 11 Duke	15	–	5	.750	25	–	6	.806
Georgia Tech*	11	–	9	.550	17	–	14	.548
NC State	10	–	10	.500	20	–	12	.625
Syracuse	10	–	10	.500	18	–	14	.563
Notre Dame	10	–	10	.500	20	–	12	.625
Clemson	9	–	11	.450	16	–	15	.516
Miami (FL)	7	–	13	.350	15	–	16	.484
Boston College	7	–	13	.350	13	–	18	.419
Virginia Tech	7	–	13	.350	16	–	16	.500
Wake Forest	6	–	14	.300	13	–	18	.419
Pittsburgh	6	–	14	.300	16	–	17	.485
North Carolina	6	–	14	.300	14	–	19	.424
*Ineligible for postseason due to NCAA violations. Note: The 2020 ACC tournament was cancelled before the quarterfinals due to the COVID-19 pandemic. Rankings from AP poll

The 2019–20 Duke Blue Devils men's basketball team represented Duke University during the 2019–20 NCAA Division I men's basketball season. They were coached by 40th-year head coach, Mike Krzyzewski. The Blue Devils played their home games at Cameron Indoor Stadium in Durham, North Carolina, as a member of the Atlantic Coast Conference.

The Blue Devils finished the season 25–6, and 15–5 in ACC play. The team was scheduled to play NC State in the quarterfinals of the ACC tournament before the tournament was cancelled due to the COVID-19 pandemic. The NCAA tournament was also cancelled due to the pandemic.

== Previous season ==
The Blue Devils finished the 2018–19 season 32–6, 14–4 in ACC play to finish in second place. They won the ACC Tournament title, the school's 21st tournament championship. As a result, they received the conference's automatic bid to the NCAA tournament as the overall No. 1 seed in the East region. There, they defeated North Dakota State, UCF, and Virginia Tech to advance to the Elite Eight where they lost to No. 2 seed Michigan State.

== Offseason ==
=== Departures ===
Name	Pos.	Height	Weight	Year	Hometown	Reason for departure
Brennan Bresser	G	6'5"	190	Senior	Chicago, Illinois	Walk-on; graduated
Antonio Vrankovic	C	7'0"	269	Senior	Delray Beach, Florida	Graduated
RJ Barrett	F	6'7"	202	Freshman	Mississauga, Ontario	Declared for 2019 NBA draft; selected 3rd overall by the New York Knicks
Cam Reddish	F	6'8"	218	Freshman	Norristown, Pennsylvania	Declared for 2019 NBA draft; selected 10th overall by the Atlanta Hawks
Zion Williamson	F	6'7"	285	Freshman	Spartanburg, South Carolina	Declared for 2019 NBA draft; selected 1st overall by the New Orleans Pelicans
Marques Bolden	F	6'11"	250	Junior	DeSoto, Texas	Declared for 2019 NBA draft; undrafted

=== 2019 recruiting class ===
College recruiting
Name	Hometown	School	Height	Weight	Commit date
Wendell Moore Jr. SF	Charlotte, NC	Cox Mill (NC)	6 ft 6 in (1.98 m)	215 lb (98 kg)	Oct 8, 2018
Wendell Moore Jr. SF	Recruit ratings: Rivals: 247Sports: ESPN: (92)				
Vernon Carey Jr. C	Southwest Ranches, FL	NSU University School (FL)	6 ft 10 in (2.08 m)	275 lb (125 kg)	Dec 6, 2018
Vernon Carey Jr. C	Recruit ratings: Rivals: 247Sports: ESPN: (96)				
Matthew Hurt; PF	Rochester, MN	John Marshall (MN)	6 ft 8 in (2.03 m)	214 lb (97 kg)	Apr 19, 2019
Matthew Hurt; PF	Recruit ratings: Rivals: 247Sports: ESPN: (96)				
Cassius Stanley; SG	Los Angeles, CA	Sierra Canyon School (CA)	6 ft 5 in (1.96 m)	185 lb (84 kg)	Apr 22, 2019
Cassius Stanley; SG	Recruit ratings: Rivals: 247Sports: ESPN: (89)				
Overall recruit ranking: Rivals: 2 247Sports: 3 ESPN: 2
Note: In many cases, Scout, Rivals, 247Sports, On3, and ESPN may conflict in their listings of height and weight.; In these cases, the average was taken. ESPN grades are on a 100-point scale.; Sources: "2019 Duke Basketball Commitments". Rivals.; "ESPN- Duke Blue Devils Men's Basketball Recruiting". ESPN.; "2019 Team Ranking". Rivals.

=== 2020 recruiting class ===
College recruiting
Name	Hometown	School	Height	Weight	Commit date
Jeremy Roach; PG	Leesburg, VA	Paul VI Catholic (VA)	6 ft 2 in (1.88 m)	180 lb (82 kg)	May 8, 2019
Jeremy Roach; PG	Recruit ratings: Rivals: 247Sports: ESPN: (94)				
Jalen Johnson; SF	Milwaukee, WI	Nicolet High School (WI)	6 ft 8 in (2.03 m)	215 lb (98 kg)	Jul 4, 2019
Jalen Johnson; SF	Recruit ratings: Rivals: 247Sports: ESPN: (94)				
DJ Steward; SG	Chicago, IL	Whitney Young (IL)	6 ft 3 in (1.91 m)	160 lb (73 kg)	Sep 18, 2019
DJ Steward; SG	Recruit ratings: Rivals: 247Sports: ESPN: (92)				
Henry Coleman III; PF	Richmond, VA	Trinity Episcopal School (VA)	6 ft 8 in (2.03 m)	240 lb (110 kg)	Sep 27, 2019
Henry Coleman III; PF	Recruit ratings: Rivals: 247Sports: ESPN: (85)				
Jaemyn Brakefield; PF	Jackson, MI	Huntington Prep (WV)	6 ft 8 in (2.03 m)	215 lb (98 kg)	Oct 4, 2019
Jaemyn Brakefield; PF	Recruit ratings: Rivals: 247Sports: ESPN: (89)				
Overall recruit ranking: Rivals: 2 247Sports: 3 ESPN: 2
Note: In many cases, Scout, Rivals, 247Sports, On3, and ESPN may conflict in their listings of height and weight.; In these cases, the average was taken. ESPN grades are on a 100-point scale.; Sources: "Duke 2020 Basketball Commitments". Rivals.; "2020 Duke Blue Devils Recruiting Class". ESPN.; "2020 Team Ranking". Rivals.

== Roster ==
2019–20 Duke Blue Devils men's basketball team
Players
Coaches

Pos.	#	Name	Height	Weight	Year	Previous school	Hometown
F	50	Justin Robinson	6 ft 9 in (2.06 m)	202 lb (92 kg)	RS Sr	San Antonio Christian Academy	San Antonio, TX
F	12	Javin DeLaurier (C)	6 ft 10 in (2.08 m)	237 lb (108 kg)	Sr	Saint Anne's-Belfield	Charlottesville, VA
F	41	Jack White (C)	6 ft 7 in (2.01 m)	222 lb (101 kg)	Sr	Australian Institute of Sport	Canberra, Australia
G	15	Alex O'Connell	6 ft 6 in (1.98 m)	190 lb (86 kg)	Jr	Milton	Roswell, GA
G	14	Jordan Goldwire	6 ft 2 in (1.88 m)	185 lb (84 kg)	Jr	Norcross	Norcross, GA
G	51	Mike Buckmire	6 ft 2 in (1.88 m)	180 lb (82 kg)	Jr	Germantown Friends School	Blue Bell, PA
G	3	Tre Jones (C)	6 ft 3 in (1.91 m)	185 lb (84 kg)	So	Apple Valley	Apple Valley, MN
F	13	Joey Baker	6 ft 7 in (2.01 m)	208 lb (94 kg)	So	Trinity Christian School	Fayetteville, NC
F	0	Wendell Moore Jr.	6 ft 6 in (1.98 m)	213 lb (97 kg)	Fr	Cox Mill	Charlotte, NC
C	1	Vernon Carey Jr.	6 ft 10 in (2.08 m)	270 lb (122 kg)	Fr	NSU University School	Southwest Ranches, FL
F	21	Matthew Hurt	6 ft 9 in (2.06 m)	214 lb (97 kg)	Fr	John Marshall	Rochester, MN
G	2	Cassius Stanley	6 ft 6 in (1.98 m)	193 lb (88 kg)	Fr	Sierra Canyon	Los Angeles, CA
G	30	Michael Savarino (W)	6 ft 0 in (1.83 m)	182 lb (83 kg)	Fr	Durham Academy	Durham, NC
F	45	Keenan Worthington (W)	6 ft 9 in (2.06 m)	211 lb (96 kg)	Fr	Blair Academy (N.J.)	Chapel Hill, NC

Head coach

- Mike Krzyzewski (Army)

Assistant coach(es)

- Nate James (Duke)
- Jon Scheyer (Duke)
- Chris Carrawell (Duke)

Legend

- (C) Team captain
- (S) Suspended
- (I) Ineligible
- (W) Walk-on
- Injured
- Current redshirt

Roster
Last update: October 15, 2019

=== Depth chart ===
Pos.	Starting 5	Bench 1	Bench 2
C	Vernon Carey Jr.
PF	Javin DeLaurier	Matthew Hurt	Justin Robinson
SF	Wendell Moore Jr.	Alex O'Connell	Jack White/Joey Baker
SG	Cassius Stanley
PG	Tre Jones	Jordan Goldwire	Mike Buckmire

== Schedule and results ==
Date time, TV	Rank^{#}	Opponent^{#}	Result	Record	High points	High rebounds	High assists	Site (attendance) city, state
Exhibition
October 26, 2019*; 7:00 p.m., ACCNX	No. 4	Northwest Missouri State	W 69–63	–	18 – Jones	10 – White	3 – DeLaurier	Cameron Indoor Stadium (9,314); Durham, NC
October 30, 2019*; 7:00 p.m., ACCNX	No. 4	Fort Valley State	W 126–57	–	22 – Baker	8 – Carey	8 – Goldwire	Cameron Indoor Stadium (9,314); Durham, NC
Regular season
November 5, 2019*; 7:00 p.m., ESPN	No. 4	vs. No. 3 Kansas; Champions Classic	W 68–66	1–0	15 – Jones	6 – Tied	7 – Jones	Madison Square Garden (19,812); New York, NY
November 8, 2019*; 7:00 p.m., ACCN	No. 4	Colorado State	W 89–55	2–0	19 – Stanley	7 – Stanley	8 – Jones	Cameron Indoor Stadium (9,314); Durham, NC
November 12, 2019*; 7:00 p.m., ACCN	No. 2	Central Arkansas; Empire Classic campus-site game	W 105–54	3–0	19 – Hurt	10 – Carey	4 – Goldwire	Cameron Indoor Stadium (9,314); Durham, NC
November 15, 2019*; 7:00 p.m., ACCN	No. 2	Georgia State; Empire Classic campus-site game	W 74–63	4–0	31 – Jones	14 – Carey	6 – Jones	Cameron Indoor Stadium (9,314); Durham, NC
November 21, 2019*; 9:30 p.m., ESPN2	No. 1	vs. California; Empire Classic semifinals	W 87–52	5–0	31 – Carey	12 – Carey	7 – Jones	Madison Square Garden (12,606); New York, NY
November 22, 2019*; 7:30 p.m., ESPN2	No. 1	vs. Georgetown; Empire Classic championship game	W 81–73	6–0	21 – Stanley	10 – Carey	7 – Jones	Madison Square Garden (13,777); New York, NY
November 26, 2019*; 9:00 p.m., ACCRSN	No. 1	Stephen F. Austin	L 83–85 ^{OT}	6–1	20 – Carey Jr.	11 – Carey Jr.	12 – Jones	Cameron Indoor Stadium (9,314); Durham, NC
November 29, 2019*; 7:00 p.m., ACCN	No. 1	Winthrop	W 83–70	7–1	20 – Hurt	10 – Carey Jr.	6 – Jones	Cameron Indoor Stadium (9,314); Durham, NC
December 3, 2019*; 9:30 p.m., ESPN	No. 10	at No. 11 Michigan State; ACC–Big Ten Challenge	W 87–75	8–1	26 – Carey	11 – Carey	12 – Jones	Breslin Center (14,797); East Lansing, MI
December 6, 2019; 7:00 p.m., ACCN	No. 10	at Virginia Tech	W 77–63	9–1 (1–0)	15 – Jones	6 – Tied	4 – Jones	Cassell Coliseum (9,275); Blacksburg, VA
December 19, 2019*; 7:00 p.m., ESPN2	No. 4	Wofford	W 86–57	10–1	22 – Baker	10 – Carey Jr.	5 – Goldwire	Cameron Indoor Stadium (9,314); Durham, NC
December 28, 2019*; 11:30 a.m., ESPN2	No. 4	Brown	W 75–50	11–1	19 – Carey Jr.	7 – Moore Jr.	5 – Goldwire	Cameron Indoor Stadium (9,314); Durham, NC
December 31, 2019; 6:00 p.m., ACCN	No. 2	Boston College	W 88–49	12–1 (2–0)	25 – Hurt	9 – Carey	10 – Jones	Cameron Indoor Stadium (9,314); Durham, NC
January 4, 2020; 8:00 p.m., ESPN	No. 2	at Miami (FL)	W 95–62	13–1 (3–0)	24 – Carey	9 – Carey	5 – Jones	Watsco Center (7,049); Coral Gables, FL
January 8, 2020; 9:00 p.m., ACCN	No. 2	at Georgia Tech	W 73–64	14–1 (4–0)	16 – Jones	8 – Jones	7 – Jones	McCamish Pavilion (8,600); Atlanta, GA
January 11, 2020; 8:00 p.m., ACCN	No. 2	Wake Forest	W 90–59	15–1 (5–0)	23 – Jones	6 – Tied	6 – Goldwire	Cameron Indoor Stadium (9,314); Durham, NC
January 14, 2020; 7:00 p.m., ESPN	No. 3	at Clemson	L 72–79	15–2 (5–1)	20 – Carey	7 – Carey	4 – Tied	Littlejohn Coliseum (8,494); Clemson, SC
January 18, 2020; 6:00 p.m., ESPN	No. 3	No. 11 Louisville; ESPN College GameDay	L 73–79	15–3 (5–2)	24 – Stanley	11 – Stanley	7 – Jones	Cameron Indoor Stadium (9,314); Durham, NC
January 21, 2020; 9:00 p.m., ESPN	No. 8	Miami (FL)	W 89–59	16–3 (6–2)	22 – Hurt	9 – DeLaurier	6 – Jones	Cameron Indoor Stadium (9,314); Durham, NC
January 28, 2020; 9:00 p.m., ESPN	No. 9	Pittsburgh	W 79–67	17–3 (7–2)	26 – Carey	13 – Carey	8 – Jones	Cameron Indoor Stadium (9,314); Durham, NC
February 1, 2020; 8:00 p.m., ESPN	No. 9	at Syracuse	W 97–88	18–3 (8–2)	26 – Carey Jr.	17 – Carey Jr.	6 – Jones	Carrier Dome (31,458); Syracuse, NY
February 4, 2020; 7:00 p.m., ESPN	No. 7	at Boston College	W 63–55	19–3 (9–2)	18 – Jones	17 – Carey Jr.	4 – Jones	Conte Forum (8,606); Chestnut Hill, MA
February 8, 2020; 6:00 p.m., ESPN	No. 7	at North Carolina; Rivalry/ESPN College GameDay	W 98–96 ^{OT}	20–3 (10–2)	28 – Jones	10 – Moore Jr.	6 – Jones	Dean Smith Center (21,500); Chapel Hill, NC
February 10, 2020; 7:00 p.m., ESPN	No. 7	No. 8 Florida State	W 70–65	21–3 (11–2)	13 – Tied	10 – Carey Jr.	6 – Jones	Cameron Indoor Stadium (9,314); Durham, NC
February 15, 2020; 4:00 p.m., ESPN	No. 7	Notre Dame	W 94–60	22–3 (12–2)	21 – Carey Jr.	9 – Hurt	6 – Jones	Cameron Indoor Stadium (9,314); Durham, NC
February 19, 2020; 9:00 p.m., ESPN	No. 6	at NC State	L 66–88	22–4 (12–3)	27 – Carey Jr.	12 – Carey Jr.	4 – Jones	PNC Arena (19,515); Raleigh, NC
February 22, 2020; 4:00 p.m., ESPN2	No. 6	Virginia Tech	W 88–64	23–4 (13–3)	21 – Stanley	10 – Hurt	4 – Tied	Cameron Indoor Stadium (9,314); Durham, NC
February 25, 2020; 7:00 p.m., ACCN	No. 7	at Wake Forest	L 101–113 ^{2OT}	23–5 (13–4)	25 – Moore Jr.	7 – Tied	9 – Jones	LJVM Coliseum (11,681); Winston-Salem, NC
February 29, 2020; 6:00 p.m., ESPN	No. 7	at Virginia	L 50–52	23–6 (13–5)	17 – Tied	10 – Carey Jr.	2 – Jones	John Paul Jones Arena (14,629); Charlottesville, VA
March 2, 2020; 7:00 p.m., ESPN	No. 12	NC State	W 88–69	24–6 (14–5)	18 – Stanley	7 – Carey Jr.	5 – Goldwire	Cameron Indoor Stadium (9,314); Durham, NC
March 7, 2020; 6:00 p.m., ESPN	No. 12	North Carolina; Rivalry	W 89–76	25–6 (15–5)	25 – Carey Jr.	10 – Carey Jr.	11 – Jones	Cameron Indoor Stadium (9,314); Durham, NC
ACC tournament
March 12, 2020; 2:30 p.m., ESPN	(4) No. 10	vs. (5) NC State; Quarterfinals	ACC Tournament Cancelled					Greensboro Coliseum; Greensboro, NC
*Non-conference game. ^{#}Rankings from AP Poll. (#) Tournament seedings in parentheses. All times are in Eastern Time.

== Rankings ==
In the preseason Associated Press Top 25 poll, Duke was ranked No. 4 nationally before the start of the 2019–20 season.

Ranking movements Legend: ██ Increase in ranking ██ Decrease in ranking ( ) = First-place votes
	Week																			
Poll	Pre	1	2	3	4	5	6	7	8	9	10	11	12	13	14	15	16	17	18	Final
AP	4	2	1 (52)	1 (53)	10	7	4 (2)	4 (1)	2 (1)	2 (9)	3 (4)	8	9	7	7	6	7	12	10	11
Coaches	4 (1)	4^ (1)	1 (25)	1 (27)	8	5	3 (2)	3	2 (1)	2 (4)	3 (6)	8	8	7	7	6	7	11	10	8

*AP does not release post-NCAA Tournament rankings.
^Coaches did not release a week 2 poll.
