= 2018–19 Duke Blue Devils men's basketball team =

American college basketball season

2018–19 Duke Blue Devils men's basketball

ACC tournament champions

NCAA tournament, Elite Eight
- Conference: Atlantic Coast Conference

Ranking
- Coaches: No. 4
- AP: No. 1
- Record: 32–6 (14–4 ACC)
- Head coach: Mike Krzyzewski (39th season)
- Assistant coaches: Nate James; Jon Scheyer; Chris Carrawell
- Home arena: Cameron Indoor Stadium

2018–19 ACC men's basketball standings
	Conf.				Overall
Team	W		L	PCT	W		L	PCT
No. 2 Virginia	16	–	2	.889	35	–	3	.921
No. 3 North Carolina	16	–	2	.889	29	–	7	.806
No. 1 Duke †	14	–	4	.778	32	–	6	.842
No. 10 Florida State	13	–	5	.722	29	–	8	.784
No. 16 Virginia Tech	12	–	6	.667	26	–	9	.743
Syracuse	10	–	8	.556	20	–	14	.588
Louisville	10	–	8	.556	20	–	14	.588
NC State	9	–	9	.500	24	–	12	.667
Clemson	9	–	9	.500	20	–	14	.588
Georgia Tech	6	–	12	.333	14	–	18	.438
Boston College	5	–	13	.278	14	–	17	.452
Miami (FL)	5	–	13	.278	14	–	18	.438
Wake Forest	4	–	14	.222	11	–	20	.355
Pittsburgh	3	–	15	.167	14	–	19	.424
Notre Dame	3	–	15	.167	14	–	19	.424
† 2019 ACC tournament winner Rankings from AP poll

The 2018–19 Duke Blue Devils men's basketball team represented Duke University during the 2018–19 NCAA Division I men's basketball season. They were coached by 39th-year head coach, Mike Krzyzewski. The Blue Devils played their home games at Cameron Indoor Stadium in Durham, North Carolina as a member of the Atlantic Coast Conference. Led by tournament MVP Zion Williamson, they won Duke's 21st ACC tournament title. They received the ACC's automatic bid to the NCAA tournament and reached the Elite Eight, where they lost 68–67 to Michigan State. Duke finished #1 in the nation in the final RPI rankings.

== Previous season ==
The Blue Devils finished the 2017–18 season 29–8, 13–5 in ACC play to finish in second place. They defeated Notre Dame in the quarterfinals of the ACC tournament before losing to North Carolina in the semifinals. They received an at-large bid to the NCAA tournament as the No. 2 seed in the Midwest region. There they defeated Iona, Rhode Island, and Syracuse to advance to the Elite Eight. In the Elite Eight, they lost to No. 1 seed Kansas in overtime.

== Offseason ==
=== Departures ===
Name	Pos.	Height	Weight	Year	Hometown	Reason for departure
Grayson Allen	SG	6'5"	205	Senior	Jacksonville, Florida	Graduated; Declared for 2018 NBA draft
Marvin Bagley III	PF	6'11"	234	Freshman	Phoenix, Arizona	Declared for 2018 NBA draft
Wendell Carter Jr.	C/PF	6'10"	259	Freshman	Atlanta, Georgia	Declared for 2018 NBA draft
Trevon Duval	PG	6'3"	186	Freshman	Wilmington, Delaware	Declared for 2018 NBA draft
Gary Trent Jr.	SG	6'6"	209	Freshman	Columbus, Ohio	Declared for 2018 NBA draft
Jordan Tucker	F	6'7	220	Freshman	White Plains, New York	Transferred to Butler after fall 2017 semester

=== 2018 recruiting class ===
College recruiting
Name	Hometown	School	Height	Weight	Commit date
Tre Jones; PG	Saint Paul, MN	Apple Valley HS	6 ft 1 in (1.85 m)	175 lb (79 kg)	Aug 13, 2017
Tre Jones; PG	Recruit ratings: Scout: Rivals: 247Sports: ESPN: (92)				
Cam Reddish; SF	Norristown, PA	Westtown School	6 ft 7 in (2.01 m)	203 lb (92 kg)	Sep 1, 2017
Cam Reddish; SF	Recruit ratings: Scout: Rivals: 247Sports: ESPN: (95)				
Joey Baker; SF	Fayetteville, NC	Trinity Christian	6 ft 7 in (2.01 m)	190 lb (86 kg)	Oct 29, 2017
Joey Baker; SF	Recruit ratings: Scout: Rivals: 247Sports: ESPN: (89)				
RJ Barrett; SF/SG	Mississauga, ON	Montverde Academy (FL)	6 ft 7 in (2.01 m)	200 lb (91 kg)	Nov 10, 2017
RJ Barrett; SF/SG	Recruit ratings: Scout: Rivals: 247Sports: ESPN: (96)				
Zion Williamson; PF	Spartanburg, SC	Spartanburg Day School	6 ft 6 in (1.98 m)	272 lb (123 kg)	Jan 20, 2018
Zion Williamson; PF	Recruit ratings: Scout: Rivals: 247Sports: ESPN: (96)				
Overall recruit ranking: Scout: 1 Rivals: 1 ESPN: 1
Note: In many cases, Scout, Rivals, 247Sports, On3, and ESPN may conflict in their listings of height and weight.; In these cases, the average was taken. ESPN grades are on a 100-point scale.; Sources: "2018 Team Ranking". Rivals.

== Roster ==
2018–19 Duke Blue Devils men's basketball team
Players
Coaches

Pos.	#	Name	Height	Weight	Year	Previous school	Hometown
F	1	Zion Williamson	6 ft 7 in (2.01 m)	285 lb (129 kg)	Fr	Spartanburg Day School	Spartanburg, South Carolina
F	2	Cam Reddish	6 ft 8 in (2.03 m)	218 lb (99 kg)	Fr	Westtown School	Norristown, Pennsylvania
G	3	Tre Jones	6 ft 2 in (1.88 m)	183 lb (83 kg)	Fr	Apple Valley	St. Paul, Minnesota
F	5	RJ Barrett	6 ft 7 in (2.01 m)	202 lb (92 kg)	Fr	Montverde Academy (FL)	Mississauga, Ontario
F	12	Javin DeLaurier (C)	6 ft 10 in (2.08 m)	234 lb (106 kg)	Jr	St. Anne's-Belfield School	Charlottesville, Virginia
F	13	Joey Baker	6 ft 7 in (2.01 m)	200 lb (91 kg)	Fr	Trinity Christian	Fayetteville, North Carolina
G	14	Jordan Goldwire	6 ft 2 in (1.88 m)	181 lb (82 kg)	So	Norcross HS	Norcross, Georgia
G	15	Alex O'Connell	6 ft 6 in (1.98 m)	183 lb (83 kg)	So	Milton HS	Milton, Georgia
C	20	Marques Bolden	6 ft 11 in (2.11 m)	250 lb (113 kg)	Jr	DeSoto HS	DeSoto, Texas
C	30	Antonio Vrankovic	7 ft 0 in (2.13 m)	269 lb (122 kg)	Sr	Pine Crest School	Delray Beach, Florida
F	41	Jack White (C)	6 ft 7 in (2.01 m)	222 lb (101 kg)	Jr	Australian Institute of Sport	Canberra, Australia
G	50	Justin Robinson	6 ft 10 in (2.08 m)	202 lb (92 kg)	RS Jr	San Antonio Christian	San Antonio, Texas
G	51	Mike Buckmire (W)	6 ft 2 in (1.88 m)	172 lb (78 kg)	So	Germantown Friends School	Blue Bell, Pennsylvania
G	53	Brennan Besser (W)	6 ft 5 in (1.96 m)	190 lb (86 kg)	Sr	Latin School	Chicago, Illinois

Head coach

- Mike Krzyzewski

Assistant coach(es)

- Nate James
- Jon Scheyer
- Chris Carrawell

Legend

- (C) Team captain
- (S) Suspended
- (I) Ineligible
- (W) Walk-on
- Injured
- Current redshirt

Roster

== Depth chart ==
Pos.	Starting 5	Bench 1	Bench 2
C	Marques Bolden	Javin DeLaurier	Antonio Vrankovic
PF	Zion Williamson	Jack White	Justin Robinson
SF	Cam Reddish	Joey Baker
SG	RJ Barrett	Alex O'Connell	Brennan Besser
PG	Tre Jones	Jordan Goldwire	Mike Buckmire

== Schedule and results ==
Date time, TV	Rank^{#}	Opponent^{#}	Result	Record	High points	High rebounds	High assists	Site (attendance) city, state
Duke Canada Tour
August 15, 2018*; 7:00 pm, ESPN+		vs. Ryerson	W 86–67	–	34 – Barrett	13 – Williamson	4 – Williamson	Paramount Fine Foods Centre (5,490); Toronto, ON
August 17, 2018*; 6:00 pm, ESPN+		vs. Toronto	W 96–60	–	35 – Barrett	9 – Barrett	5 – White	Paramount Fine Foods Centre (5,490); Toronto, ON
August 19, 2018*; 3:00 pm, ESPN+		vs. McGill	W 103–58	–	36 – Williamson	13 – Williamson	10 – Barrett	Place Bell (10,098); Laval, QC
Exhibition
October 23, 2018*; 7:00 pm, ACCN Extra	No. 4	Virginia Union	W 106–64	–	29 – Williamson	6 – Tied	9 – Tied	Cameron Indoor Stadium (9,314); Durham, NC
October 27, 2018*; 4:00 pm, ACCN Extra	No. 4	Ferris State	W 132–48	–	32 – Barrett	10 – Williamson	10 – Jones	Cameron Indoor Stadium (9,314); Durham, NC
Non-conference regular season
November 6, 2018*; 9:30 pm, ESPN	No. 4	vs. No. 2 Kentucky; Champions Classic	W 118–84	1–0	33 – Barrett	11 – White	7 – Jones	Bankers Life Fieldhouse (18,907); Indianapolis, IN
November 11, 2018*; 1:00 pm, ESPN	No. 4	Army	W 94–72	2–0	27 – Williamson	15 – Williamson	7 – Jones	Cameron Indoor Stadium (9,314); Durham, NC
November 14, 2018*; 7:00 pm, ACCRSN	No. 1	Eastern Michigan	W 84–46	3–0	21 – Williamson	9 – Williamson	8 – Jones	Cameron Indoor Stadium (9,314); Durham, NC
November 19, 2018*; 5:00 pm, ESPN2	No. 1	vs. San Diego State; Maui Invitational tournament quarterfinals	W 90–64	4–0	20 – Barrett	8 – White	5 – Barrett	Lahaina Civic Center (2,400); Lahaina, HI
November 20, 2018*; 8:30 pm, ESPN	No. 1	vs. No. 8 Auburn; Maui Invitational Tournament semifinals	W 78–72	5–0	18 – Tied	9 – Tied	6 – Jones	Lahaina Civic Center (2,400); Lahaina, HI
November 21, 2018*; 5:00 pm, ESPN	No. 1	vs. No. 3 Gonzaga; Maui Invitational Tournament championship	L 87–89	5–1	23 – Barrett	10 – Williamson	3 – Tied	Lahaina Civic Center (2,400); Lahaina, HI
November 27, 2018*; 9:30 pm, ESPN	No. 3	Indiana; ACC–Big Ten Challenge	W 90–69	6–1	25 – Williamson	9 – Barrett	8 – Jones	Cameron Indoor Stadium (9,314); Durham, NC
December 1, 2018*; 7:00 pm, ESPN2	No. 3	Stetson	W 113–49	7–1	26 – Barrett	9 – White	7 – Tied	Cameron Indoor Stadium (9,314); Durham, NC
December 5, 2018*; 7:00 pm, ESPN2	No. 3	Hartford	W 84–54	8–1	27 – Barrett	15 – Barrett	6 – Jones	Cameron Indoor Stadium (9,314); Durham, NC
December 8, 2018*; 5:30 pm, ESPN	No. 3	Yale	W 91–58	9–1	30 – Barrett	12 – White	6 – Barrett	Cameron Indoor Stadium (9,314); Durham, NC
December 18, 2018*; 6:00 pm, ESPN2	No. 2	Princeton	W 101–50	10–1	27 – Barrett	10 – Williamson	6 – Jones	Cameron Indoor Stadium (9,314); Durham, NC
December 20, 2018*; 7:00 pm, ESPN2	No. 2	vs. No. 12 Texas Tech; New York Showcase	W 69–58	11–1	17 – Williamson	13 – Williamson	5 – Jones	Madison Square Garden (19,812); New York, NY
ACC regular season
January 5, 2019; 8:00 pm, ESPN	No. 1	Clemson	W 87–68	12–1 (1–0)	25 – Williamson	10 – Williamson	9 – Jones	Cameron Indoor Stadium (9,314); Durham, NC
January 8, 2019; 7:00 pm, ESPN	No. 1	at Wake Forest	W 87–65	13–1 (2–0)	30 – Williamson	10 – Williamson	7 – Tied	LJVM Coliseum (14,268); Winston-Salem, NC
January 12, 2019; 2:00 pm, ESPN	No. 1	at No. 13 Florida State	W 80–78	14–1 (3–0)	32 – Barrett	8 – Williamson	6 – Jones	Donald L. Tucker Center (11,675); Tallahassee, FL
January 14, 2019; 7:00 pm, ESPN	No. 1	Syracuse	L 91–95 ^{OT}	14–2 (3–1)	35 – Williamson	16 – Barrett	9 – Barrett	Cameron Indoor Stadium (9,314); Durham, NC
January 19, 2019; 6:00 pm, ESPN	No. 1	No. 4 Virginia; ESPN College GameDay	W 72–70	15–2 (4–1)	30 – Barrett	9 – Williamson	3 – Barrett	Cameron Indoor Stadium (9,314); Durham, NC
January 22, 2019; 9:00 pm, ESPN	No. 2	at Pittsburgh	W 79–64	16–2 (5–1)	26 – Barrett	9 – Bolden	7 – Williamson	Petersen Events Center (12,881); Pittsburgh, PA
January 26, 2019; 12:00 pm, Raycom	No. 2	Georgia Tech	W 66–53	17–2 (6–1)	24 – Barrett	11 – Barrett	6 – Reddish	Cameron Indoor Stadium (9,314); Durham, NC
January 28, 2019; 7:00 pm, ESPN	No. 2	at Notre Dame	W 83–61	18–2 (7–1)	26 – Williamson	9 – Tied	5 – Jones	Edmund P. Joyce Center (9,149); South Bend, IN
February 2, 2019*; 12:00 pm, ESPN	No. 2	St. John's	W 91–61	19–2	29 – Williamson	14 – Barrett	7 – Jones	Cameron Indoor Stadium (9,314); Durham, NC
February 5, 2019; 7:00 pm, ESPN	No. 2	Boston College	W 80–55	20–2 (8–1)	24 – Reddish	17 – Williamson	3 – Tied	Cameron Indoor Stadium (9,314); Durham, NC
February 9, 2019; 6:00 pm, ESPN	No. 2	at No. 3 Virginia; ESPN College GameDay	W 81–71	21–2 (9–1)	26 – Barrett	7 – Barrett	7 – Jones	John Paul Jones Arena (14,629); Charlottesville, VA
February 12, 2019; 9:00 pm, ESPN	No. 2	at No. 16 Louisville	W 71–69	22–2 (10–1)	27 – Williamson	12 – Williamson	4 – Barrett	KFC Yum! Center (22,046); Louisville, KY
February 16, 2019; 6:00 pm, ESPN	No. 2	NC State	W 94–78	23–2 (11–1)	32 – Williamson	11 – Barrett	10 – Barrett	Cameron Indoor Stadium (9,314); Durham, NC
February 20, 2019; 9:00 pm, ESPN/Raycom	No. 1	No. 8 North Carolina; Rivalry/ESPN College GameDay	L 72–88	23–3 (11–2)	33 – Barrett	13 – Barrett	5 – Jones	Cameron Indoor Stadium (9,314); Durham, NC
February 23, 2019; 6:00 pm, ESPN	No. 1	at Syracuse	W 75–65	24–3 (12–2)	30 – Barrett	8 – Bolden	7 – Barrett	Carrier Dome (35,642^{†}); Syracuse, NY
February 26, 2019; 7:00 pm, ESPN	No. 3	at No. 20 Virginia Tech	L 72–77	24–4 (12–3)	21 – Barrett	6 – Tied	5 – Tied	Cassell Coliseum (9,275); Blacksburg, VA
March 2, 2019; 4:00 pm, CBS	No. 3	Miami (FL)	W 87–57	25–4 (13–3)	19 – Barrett	10 – Barrett	7 – Barrett	Cameron Indoor Stadium (9,314); Durham, NC
March 5, 2019; 7:00 pm, ESPN	No. 4	Wake Forest	W 71–70	26–4 (14–3)	28 – Barrett	10 – White	4 – Barrett	Cameron Indoor Stadium (9,314); Durham, NC
March 9, 2019; 6:00 pm, ESPN	No. 4	at No. 3 North Carolina; Rivalry/ESPN College GameDay	L 70–79	26–5 (14–4)	26 – Barrett	12 – Barrett	7 – Jones	Dean Smith Center (21,750); Chapel Hill, NC
ACC Tournament
March 14, 2019; 9:00 pm, ESPN	(3) No. 5	vs. (6) Syracuse; Quarterfinals	W 84–72	27–5	29 – Williamson	14 – Williamson	8 – Jones	Spectrum Center (19,691); Charlotte, NC
March 15, 2019; 9:00 pm, ESPN	(3) No. 5	vs. (2) No. 3 North Carolina; Semifinals/Rivalry	W 74–73	28–5	31 – Williamson	11 – Williamson	7 – Barrett	Spectrum Center (20,116); Charlotte, NC
March 16, 2019; 8:30 pm, ESPN	(3) No. 5	vs. (4) No. 12 Florida State; Championship	W 73–63	29–5	21 – Williamson	9 – Barrett	6 – Jones	Spectrum Center (19,691); Charlotte, NC
NCAA tournament
March 22, 2019*; 7:10 pm, CBS	(1 E) No. 1	vs. (16 E) North Dakota State; First Round	W 85–62	30–5	26 – Barrett	14 – Barrett	4 – Jones	Colonial Life Arena (16,219); Columbia, SC
March 24, 2019*; 5:15 pm, CBS	(1 E) No. 1	vs. (9 E) UCF; Second Round	W 77–76	31–5	32 – Williamson	11 – Williamson	4 – Tied	Colonial Life Arena (16,332); Columbia, SC
March 29, 2019; 9:45 pm, CBS	(1 E) No. 1	vs. (4 E) No. 16 Virginia Tech; Sweet Sixteen	W 75–73	32–5	23 – Williamson	7 – O'Connell	11 – Barrett	Capital One Arena (20,006); Washington, D.C.
March 31, 2019*; 5:05 pm, CBS	(1 E) No. 1	vs. (2 E) No. 5 Michigan State; Elite Eight	L 67–68	32–6	24 – Williamson	14 – Williamson	6 – Barrett	Capital One Arena (20,125); Washington, D.C.
*Non-conference game. ^{#}Rankings from AP Poll. (#) Tournament seedings in parentheses. E=East. All times are in Eastern Time.

† Record for the largest on-campus attendance in college basketball history.

== Ranking movement ==
Ranking movements Legend: ██ Increase in ranking ██ Decrease in ranking т = Tied with team above or below ( ) = First-place votes
	Week																				
Poll	Pre	1	2	3	4	5	6	7	8	9	10	11	12	13	14	15	16	17	18	19	Final
AP	4 (4)	1 (48)	1 (53)	3 (1)	3 (1)	2 (4)	2 (5)	1 (35)	1 (35)	1 (37)	1 (36)	2 (11)	2 (12)	2 (12)	2 (24)	1 (58)	3 (3)	4 (1)	5	1	Not released
Coaches	3 (4)	3^ (4)	1 (32)	3	3	2 (1)	2 (1)	2 (9)	1 (10)	2 (8)	2 (6)	2 (2)	2 (1)	2	2 (2)	1 (28)	2-T	4-T	5	1	4

^Coaches did not release a Week 2 poll.
*AP does not release post-NCAA Tournament rankings
