= Javin DeLaurier =

American basketball player (born 1998)

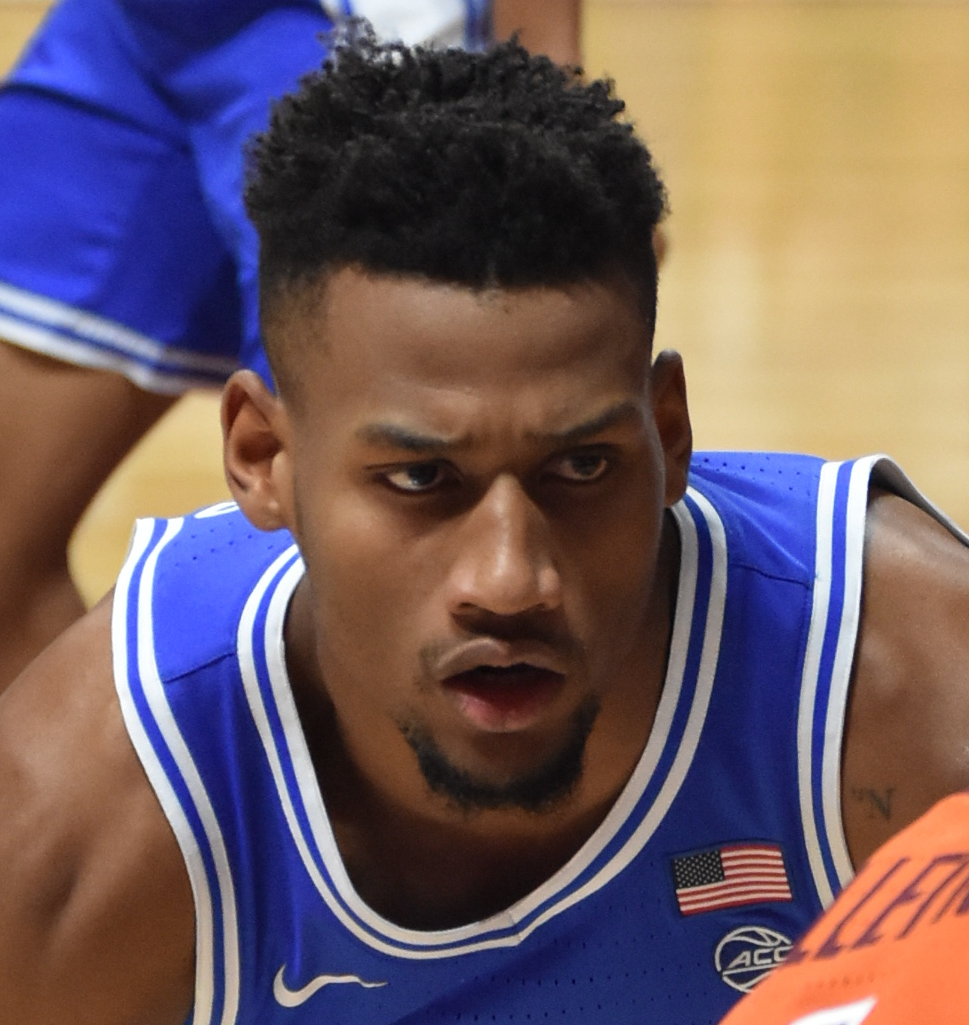
- DeLaurier with Duke in 2019

Free Agent
- Position: Center / power forward

Personal information
- Born: April 7, 1998 (age 28) Mission Viejo, California, U.S.
- Listed height: 6 ft 10 in (2.08 m)
- Listed weight: 234 lb (106 kg)

Career information
- High school: St. Anne's-Belfield School (Charlottesville, Virginia)
- College: Duke (2016–2020)
- NBA draft: 2020: undrafted
- Playing career: 2021–present

Career history
- 2021: Greensboro Swarm
- 2021: Niagara River Lions
- 2021: Wisconsin Herd
- 2021–2022: Milwaukee Bucks
- 2022: Wisconsin Herd
- 2022: Karditsa
- 2022–2023: Hapoel Holon
- 2023–2024: Rytas Vilnius
- 2024: Promitheas Patras
- 2025–2026: Bursaspor

Career highlights
- Lithuanian League champion (2024); All-CEBL First Team (2021); CEBL rebounding champion (2021)
- Stats at NBA.com
- Stats at Basketball Reference

Javin Que DeLaurier (born April 7, 1998) is an American professional basketball player who last played for Bursaspor Basketbol of the Basketbol Süper Ligi (BSL). He played four years of college basketball for the Duke Blue Devils.

== High school career ==
DeLaurier attended St. Anne's-Belfield School in Charlottesville, Virginia. As a sophomore, DeLaurier averaged 11.7 points, 12.7 rebounds and 3.0 blocks per game. After his sophomore season concluded, DeLaurier was invited to the NBA Top 100 camp. As a junior, he averaged 21.8 points, 13.3 rebounds, 5.1 assists, and 4.2 blocks per game to lead his team to the quarterfinals of the 2015 state tournament. During the summer, Delaurier joined his AAU team, Team loaded Virginia on the Adidas Uprising Circuit, where he averaged 10.0 points and 7.0 rebounds per game leading them to an Adidas uprising championship in Las Vegas. As a senior, he averaged 21.9 points, 12.9 rebounds, 4.1 assists, and 3.3 blocks per game, earning All-Central Virginia Player of the Year honors.

=== Recruiting ===
DeLaurier was rated as a four-star recruit in the 2016 high school class. On September 27, 2015, DeLaurier committed to Duke, choosing the Blue Devils over other offers from North Carolina, Arizona, and Notre Dame. DeLaurier was part of a recruiting class that featured five-star recruits and future NBA players Jayson Tatum, Harry Giles III, Frank Jackson and Marques Bolden.

College recruiting
Name	Hometown	School	Height	Weight	Commit date
Javin DeLaurier; PF	Shipman, VA	St. Anne's-Belfield School (VA)	6 ft 8 in (2.03 m)	215 lb (98 kg)	Sep 27, 2015
Javin DeLaurier; PF	Recruit ratings: Rivals: 247Sports: ESPN: (87)				
Overall recruit ranking: Rivals: 39 247Sports: 52 ESPN: 45
Note: In many cases, Scout, Rivals, 247Sports, On3, and ESPN may conflict in their listings of height and weight.; In these cases, the average was taken. ESPN grades are on a 100-point scale.; Sources: "Duke 2016 Basketball Commitments". Rivals.; "2016 Duke Blue Devils Recruiting Class". ESPN.; "2016 Team Ranking". Rivals.

== College career ==
=== Freshman season (2016–17) ===
On November 11, 2016, Delaurier scored 6 points and 8 rebounds in a 94–49 victory against Marist. On November 26, 2016, Delaurier scored 2 points, 5 rebounds and two blocks in a 93–58 win over Appalachian State University. As a freshman, DeLaurier received limited playing time and only appeared in 12 games averaging 1.6 points and 1.6 rebounds a game.

=== Sophomore season (2017–2018) ===
During his sophomore season, DeLaurier averaged 3.4 points and 4.0 rebounds per game, as the reserve power forward behind Wendell Carter Jr.

=== Junior season (2018–2019) ===
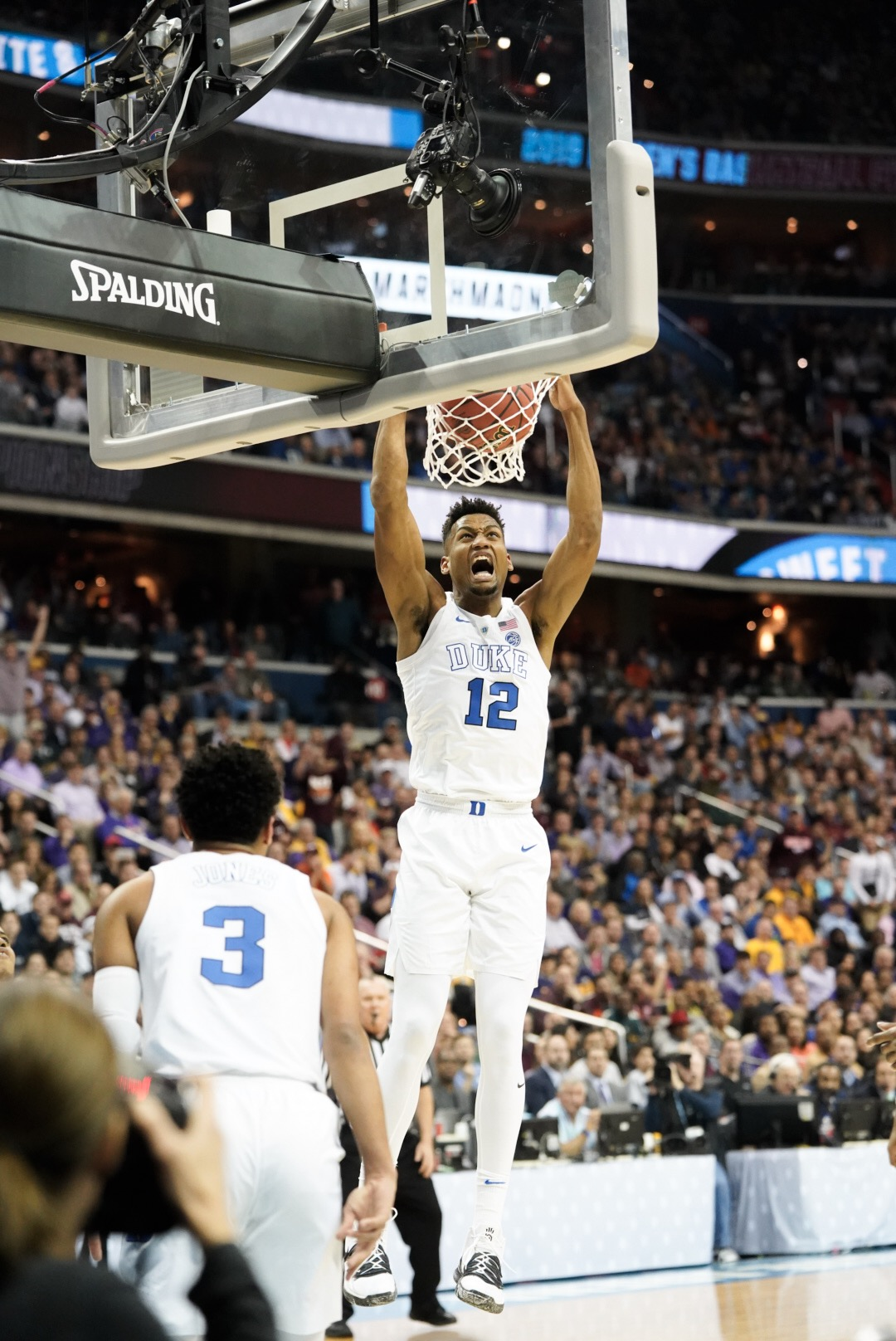
DeLaurier finishing a slam dunk with the Duke Blue Devils in 2019

In the 2019 season he shared the court with NBA All-Star Zion Williamson, RJ Barrett, and Cam Reddish. DeLaurier was named team captain alongside Jack White. On November 14, 2018, DeLaurier scored 10 points and 6 rebounds in a 84–46 win over Eastern Michigan. The 2019 season ended with a loss in the Elite Eight against Michigan State. DeLaurier finished the season averaging 3.8 points, 4.4 rebounds and 1.3 blocks per game. On April 22, 2019, DeLaurier declared for the 2019 NBA draft.

=== Senior season (2019–2020) ===
On May 29, 2019, DeLaurier announced he would return for his senior season. On June 7, 2019, DeLaurier underwent surgery on his elbow. On September 18, 2019, coach Mike Krzyzewski named DeLaurier team captain again alongside Jack White and Tre Jones for the 2019–20 season. On December 3, 2019, DeLaurier scored 10 points and 6 rebounds in a 87–75 victory over Michigan State. In his senior season, DeLaurier averaged 3.5 points and 3.5 rebounds per game.

=== Overall career ===
DeLaurier played four seasons for the Duke Blue Devils from 2016 to 2020. He was a two-time ACC Tournament champion in 2017 and 2019. During his four years at Duke, DeLaurier played a career 114 games including 23 starts and averaged 3.4 points, 3.8 rebounds, .658 shooting percentage. He also finished his final two seasons 100 blocked shots. In May 2020, DeLaurier graduated from Duke with a degree in International comparative studies.

== Professional career ==
=== Greensboro Swarm (2021) ===
After going undrafted in the 2020 NBA draft, DeLaurier signed a training camp deal with the Charlotte Hornets. He was later waived on December 19, 2020.

On January 27, 2021, DeLaurier was allocated to the Greensboro Swarm from the Charlotte Hornets to participate in the 2021 G League Bubble. He played 7 games, averaging 2.9 points and 3.3 rebounds in 11.1 minutes.

=== Niagara River Lions (2021) ===
On March 31, 2021, DeLaurier was signed by the Niagara River Lions of the Canadian Elite Basketball League. He averaged 14.8 points, 10.5 rebounds, 1.7 blocks and 1.2 steals per game.

=== Milwaukee Bucks / Wisconsin Herd (2021–2022) ===
In August 2021, DeLaurier joined the Atlanta Hawks for the 2021 NBA Summer League, recording no points in 12 minutes on 0–2 shooting, but grabbing 9 rebounds at his debut, a 85–83 loss to the Boston Celtics. On September 27, he signed with the Milwaukee Bucks, but was waived prior to the start of the season. In October 2021, he joined the Wisconsin Herd after a trade. In 12 games, he averaged 7.8 points, 6.8 rebounds and 1.4 assists in 17.0 minutes per game while shooting 60% from the field.

On December 23, 2021, DeLaurier signed a 10-day contract with the Milwaukee Bucks. He appeared in one game for the Bucks, recording one rebound. On January 2, 2022, DeLaurier was reacquired and activated by the Herd.

=== ASK Karditsas (2022) ===
On August 21, 2022, DeLaurier signed overseas with Karditsa of the Greek Basket League.

=== Hapoel Holon (2022–2023) ===
On December 12, 2022, he signed with Hapoel Holon of the Israeli Basketball Premier League.

=== Bursaspor (2025–2026) ===
On July 25, 2025, he signed with Bursaspor Basketbol of the Basketbol Süper Ligi (BSL).

== Personal life ==
DeLaurier's mother, C'ta, played college basketball for Rutgers earning Atlantic 10 Tournament MVP honors in 1993. Also has three brothers, Ethan DeLaurier (currently playing for the Naval Academy) Eli DeLaurier who is at East Carolina, and Jack DeLaurier

== Career statistics ==
Legend
GP	Games played	GS	Games started	MPG	Minutes per game
FG%	Field goal percentage	3P%	3-point field goal percentage	FT%	Free throw percentage
RPG	Rebounds per game	APG	Assists per game	SPG	Steals per game
BPG	Blocks per game	PPG	Points per game	**Bold**	Career high

=== NBA ===
Year	Team	GP	GS	MPG	FG%	3P%	FT%	RPG	APG	SPG	BPG	PPG
2021–22	Milwaukee	1	0	3.0	—	—	—	1.0	.0	1.0	.0	.0
Career		1	0	3.0	—	—	—	1.0	.0	1.0	.0	.0

=== College ===
Year	Team	GP	GS	MPG	FG%	3P%	FT%	RPG	APG	SPG	BPG	PPG
2016–17	Duke	12	0	7.2	**.818**	.000	.250	1.9	.1	.3	.3	1.6
2017–18	Duke	33	5	12.7	.643	.125	.553	4.0	.5	.6	.6	3.4
2018–19	Duke	**38**	**16**	**16.3**	.747	.000	.560	**4.4**	.5	**.9**	**1.3**	**3.8**
2019–20	Duke	31	2	13.3	.554	**.167**	**.650**	3.6	**.5**	.6	.9	3.5
Career		114	23	13.5	.658	.125	.576	3.8	.4	.7	.9	3.4
