= 2017–18 Duke Blue Devils men's basketball team =

American college basketball season

2017–18 Duke Blue Devils men's basketball

Phil Knight Invitational Motion Bracket champions

NCAA tournament, Elite Eight
- Conference: Atlantic Coast Conference

Ranking
- Coaches: No. 4
- AP: No. 9
- Record: 29–8 (13–5 ACC)
- Head coach: Mike Krzyzewski (38th season)
- Assistant coaches: Jeff Capel; Nate James; Jon Scheyer; Nolan Smith
- Captain: Grayson Allen
- Home arena: Cameron Indoor Stadium

2017–18 ACC men's basketball standings
	Conf.				Overall
Team	W		L	PCT	W		L	PCT
No. 1 Virginia †	17	–	1	.944	31	–	3	.912
No. 9 Duke	13	–	5	.722	29	–	8	.784
No. 22 Miami (FL)	11	–	7	.611	22	–	10	.688
No. 20 Clemson	11	–	7	.611	25	–	10	.714
NC State	11	–	7	.611	21	–	12	.636
No. 10 North Carolina	11	–	7	.611	26	–	11	.703
Virginia Tech	10	–	8	.556	21	–	12	.636
Florida State	9	–	9	.500	23	–	12	.657
Louisville	9	–	9	.500	22	–	14	.611
Notre Dame	8	–	10	.444	21	–	15	.583
Syracuse	8	–	10	.444	23	–	14	.622
Boston College	7	–	11	.389	19	–	16	.543
Georgia Tech	6	–	12	.333	13	–	19	.406
Wake Forest	4	–	14	.222	11	–	20	.355
Pittsburgh	0	–	18	.000	8	–	24	.250
† 2018 ACC tournament winner Rankings from AP poll

The 2017–18 Duke Blue Devils men's basketball team represented Duke University during the 2017–18 NCAA Division I men's basketball season. They were coached by 38th-year head coach Mike Krzyzewski. The Blue Devils played their home games at Cameron Indoor Stadium in Durham, North Carolina as members of the Atlantic Coast Conference. They finished the season 29–8, 13–5 in ACC play to finish in second place. They defeated Notre Dame in the quarterfinals of the ACC tournament before losing to North Carolina in the semifinals. They received an at-large bid to the NCAA tournament as the No. 2 seed in the Midwest region. There they defeated Iona, Rhode Island, and Syracuse to advance to the Elite Eight. In the Elite Eight, they lost to No. 1 seed Kansas in overtime.

The 2017–18 Blue Devils team was one of the few teams in NCAA history to send their whole starting five pro in the off-season following their season. Four of them were drafted (two in lottery, one late first round, one second round) and another was signed as an undrafted free agent. Throughout the season, the whole starting five were in first round NBA draft projections.

== Previous season ==
The Blue Devils finished the 2016–17 season 28–9, 11–7 in ACC play to finish in fifth place. They became the first ACC team to win four games in four days on their way to winning the ACC tournament. They received the ACC's automatic bid to the NCAA tournament as the East Region's #2 seed, where they defeated #15 Troy in the first round before being upset by #7 South Carolina in the second round.

== Offseason ==
=== Departures ===
Name	Pos.	Height	Weight	Year	Hometown	Reason for departure
Amile Jefferson	PF	6'9"	224	RS senior	Philadelphia, PA	Graduated
Matt Jones	SG	6'5"	204	Senior	DeSoto, TX	Graduated
Nick Pagliuca	G	6'3"	195	Senior	Weston, MA	Walk-on; graduated
Sean Obi	PF	6'9"	255	RS junior	Kaduna, NG	Graduated and transferred to Maryland
Chase Jeter	F/C	6'10"	230	Sophomore	Las Vegas, NV	Transferred to Arizona
Luke Kennard	SG	6'6"	202	Sophomore	Franklin, OH	Declared for 2017 NBA draft; selected 12th overall by the Detroit Pistons
Harry Giles	PF	6'10"	240	Freshman	Winston-Salem, NC	Declared for 2017 NBA draft; selected 20th overall by the Portland Trail Blazers and traded to the Sacramento Kings
Frank Jackson	PG	6'3"	205	Freshman	Highland, UT	Declared for 2017 NBA draft; selected 31st overall by the Charlotte Hornets and traded to the New Orleans Pelicans
Jayson Tatum	SF	6'8"	205	Freshman	St. Louis, MO	Declared for 2017 NBA draft; selected 3rd overall by the Boston Celtics

=== 2017 recruiting class ===
Duke recruits at the 2017 McDonald's All-American Boys Game

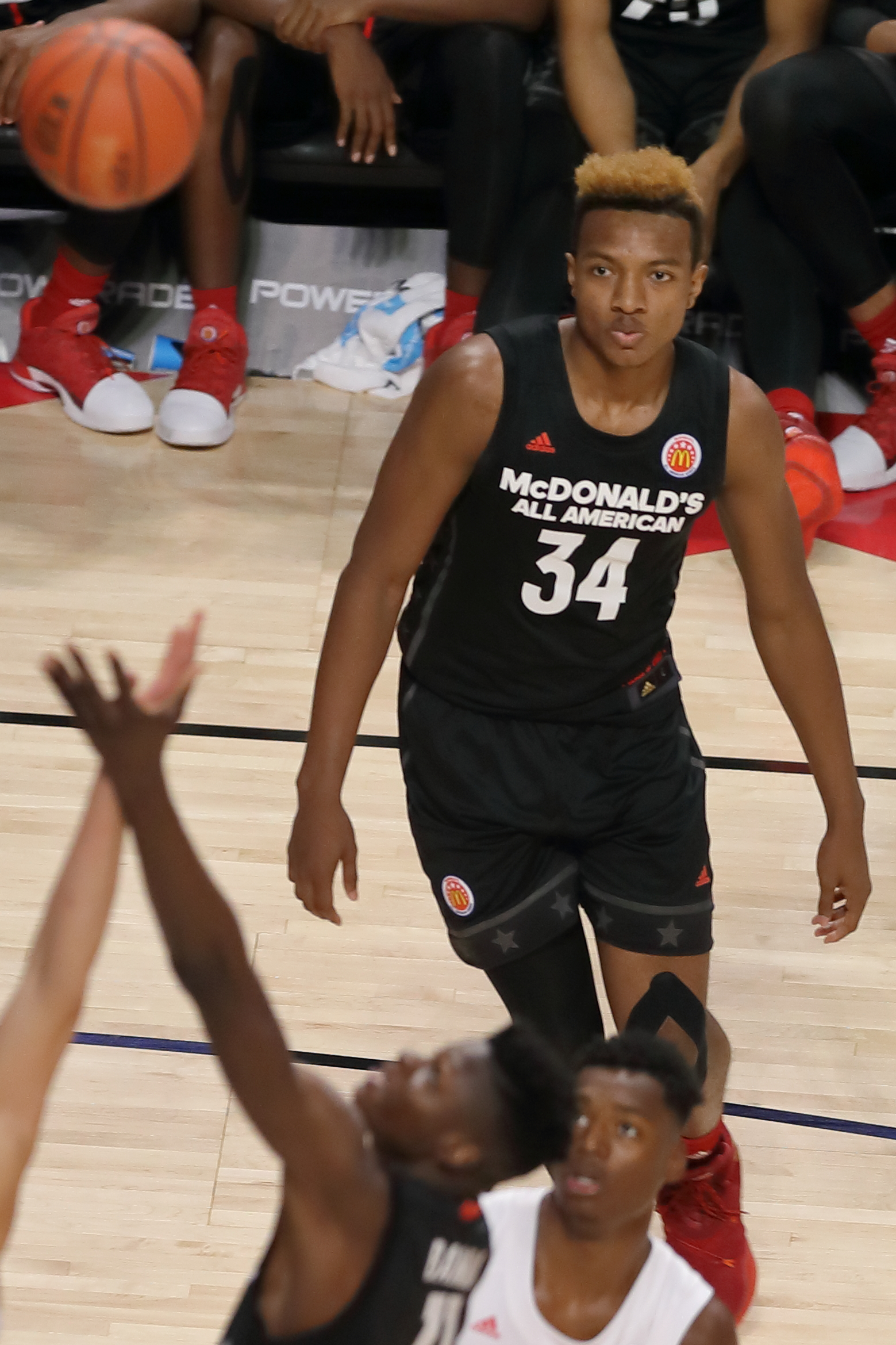
Wendell Carter Jr.

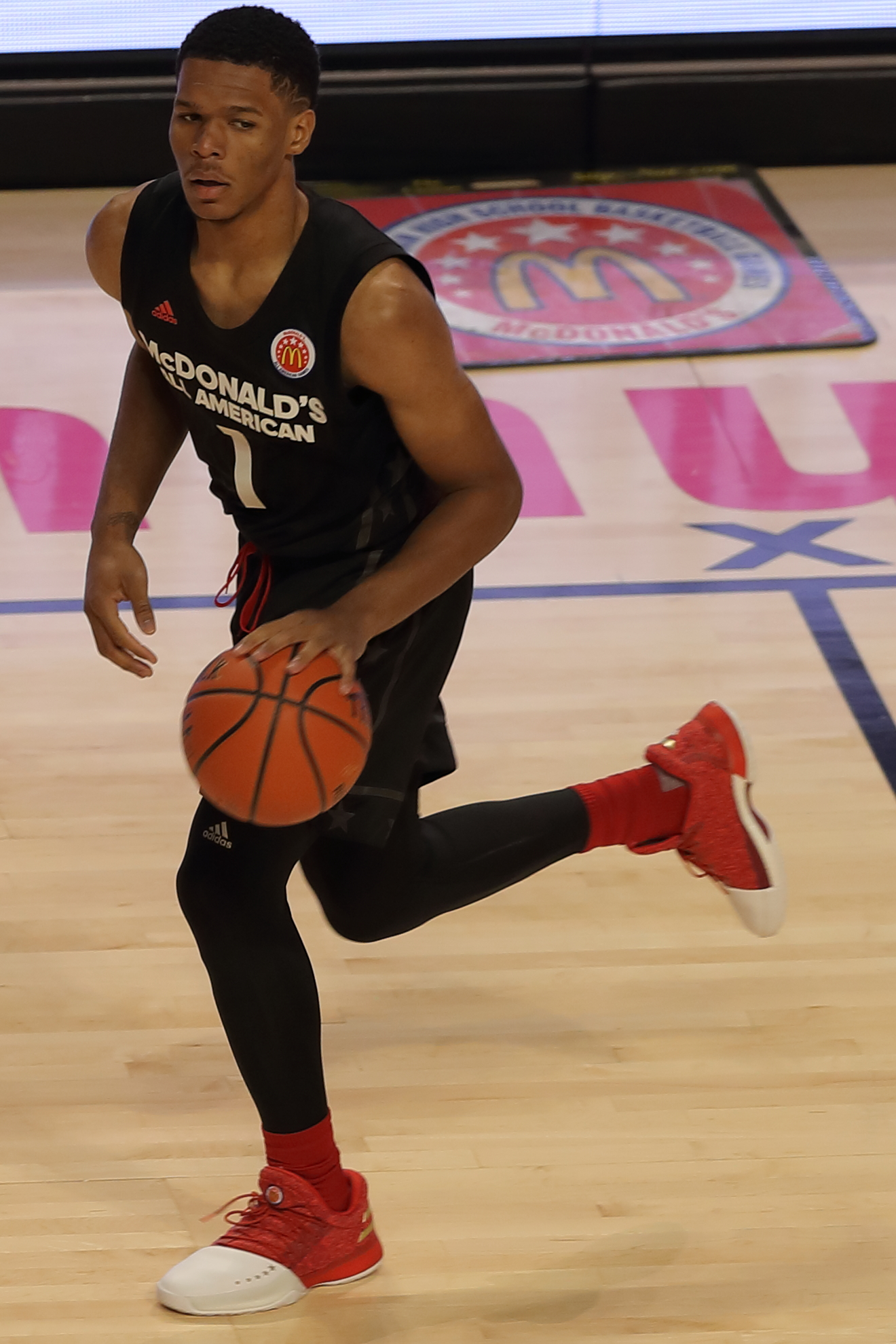
Trevon Duval

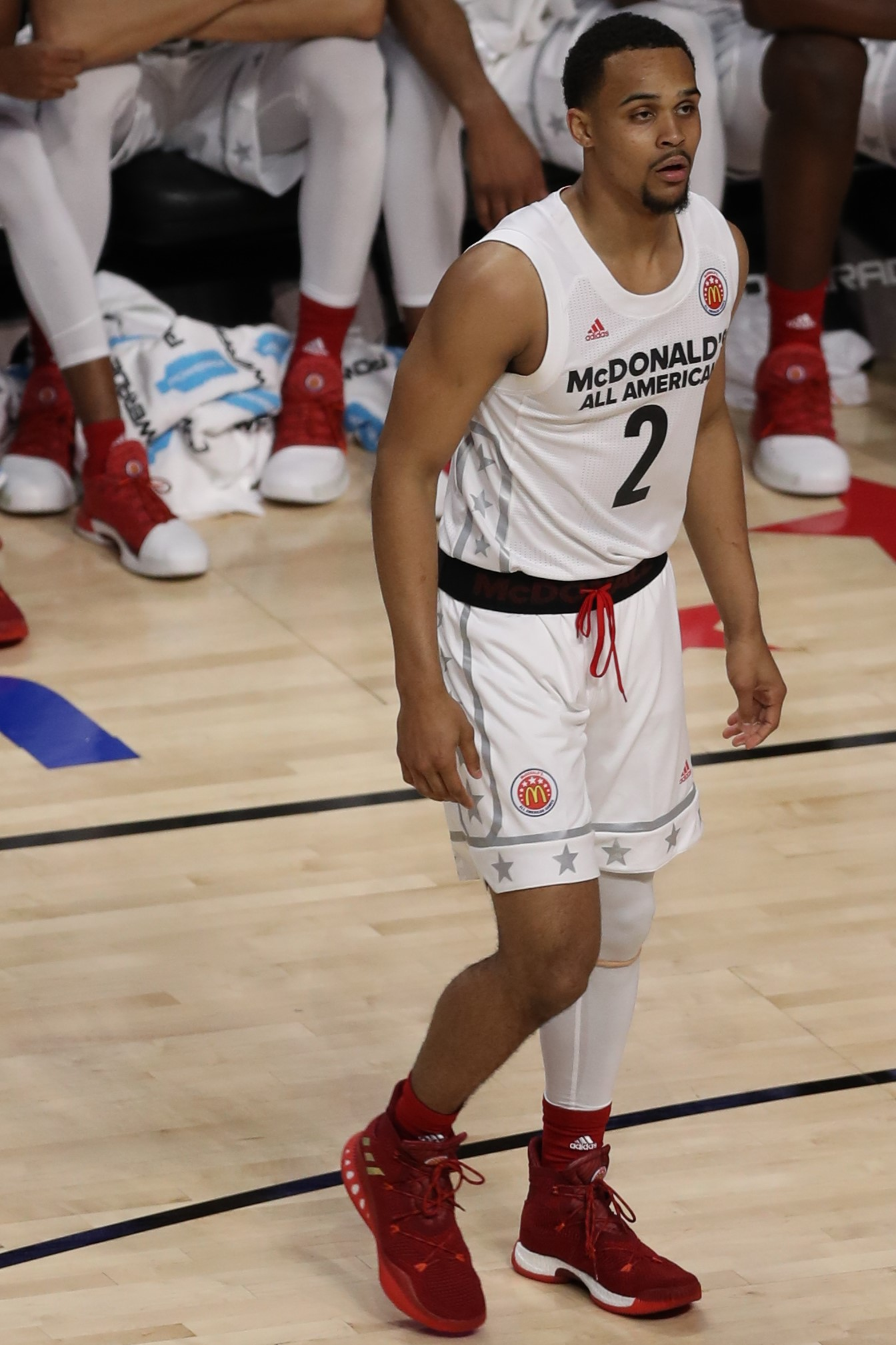
Gary Trent Jr.

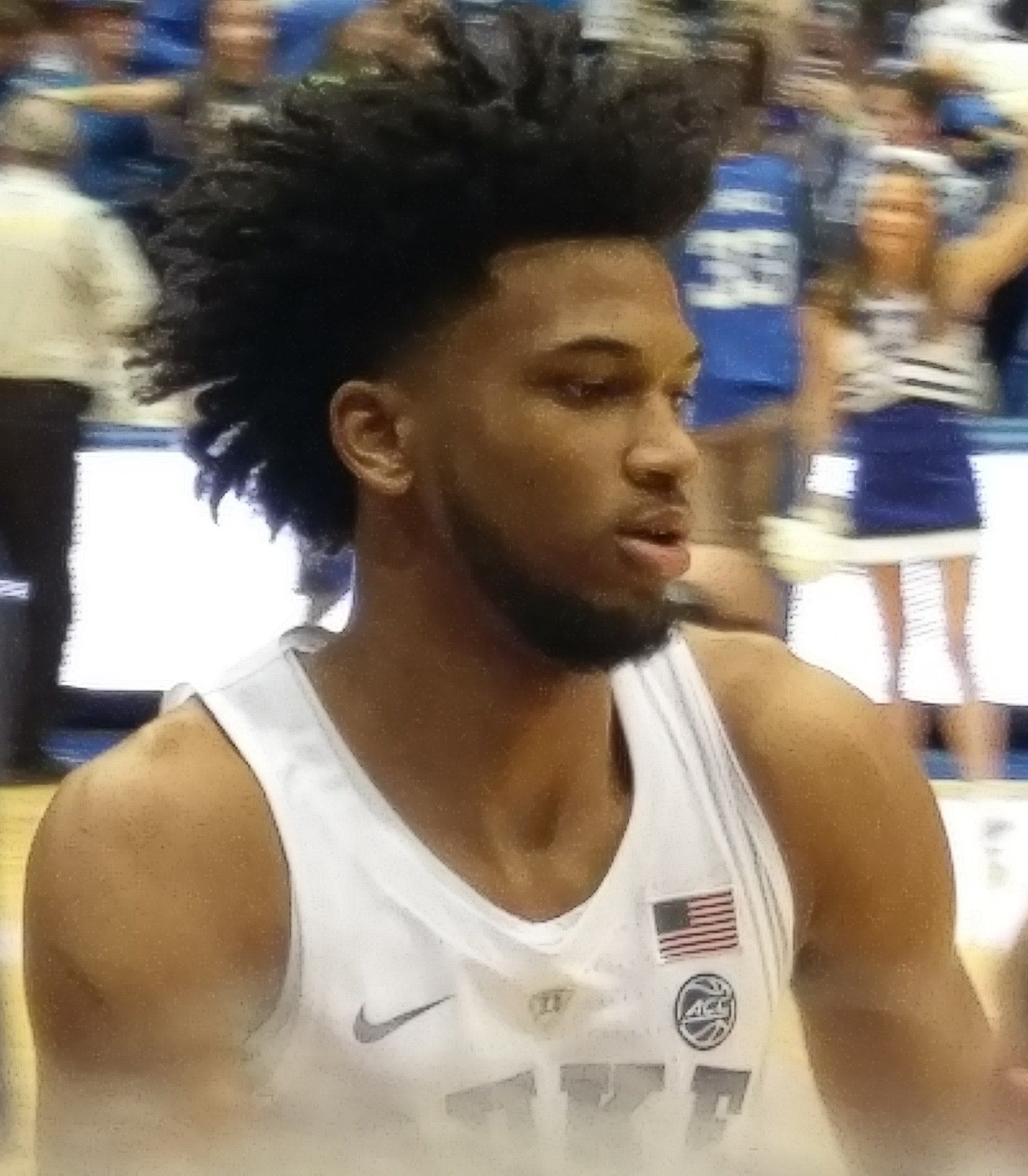
Duke recruited Marvin Bagley III, the highest-ranked prospect of the 2017 class

College recruiting
Name	Hometown	School	Height	Weight	Commit date
Alex O'Connell; SG	Milton, GA	Milton High School	6 ft 6 in (1.98 m)	170 lb (77 kg)	Aug 26, 2016
Alex O'Connell; SG	Recruit ratings: Scout: Rivals: 247Sports: ESPN: (83)				
Gary Trent Jr. SG	Apple Valley, MN	Prolific Prep (CA)	6 ft 5 in (1.96 m)	205 lb (93 kg)	Nov 10, 2016
Gary Trent Jr. SG	Recruit ratings: Scout: Rivals: 247Sports: ESPN: (95)				
Wendell Carter Jr. PF	Atlanta, GA	Pace Academy	6 ft 10 in (2.08 m)	250 lb (110 kg)	Nov 23, 2016
Wendell Carter Jr. PF	Recruit ratings: Scout: Rivals: 247Sports: ESPN: (96)				
Jordan Goldwire; PG	Norcross, GA	Norcross High School	6 ft 1 in (1.85 m)	165 lb (75 kg)	May 1, 2017
Jordan Goldwire; PG	Recruit ratings: Scout: Rivals: 247Sports: ESPN: (78)				
Jordan Tucker; SF	White Plains, NY	Joseph Wheeler High School	6 ft 7 in (2.01 m)	205 lb (93 kg)	May 13, 2017
Jordan Tucker; SF	Recruit ratings: Scout: Rivals: 247Sports: ESPN: (88)				
Trevon Duval; PG	Wilmington, DE	IMG Academy (FL)	6 ft 3 in (1.91 m)	190 lb (86 kg)	May 15, 2017
Trevon Duval; PG	Recruit ratings: Scout: Rivals: 247Sports: ESPN: (96)				
Marvin Bagley III; PF	Tempe, AZ	Sierra Canyon School (CA)	6 ft 11 in (2.11 m)	220 lb (100 kg)	Aug 14, 2017
Marvin Bagley III; PF	Recruit ratings: Scout: Rivals: 247Sports: ESPN: (98)				
Overall recruit ranking: Scout: #1 Rivals: #1 247Sports: #1 ESPN: #1
Note: In many cases, Scout, Rivals, 247Sports, On3, and ESPN may conflict in their listings of height and weight.; In these cases, the average was taken. ESPN grades are on a 100-point scale.; Sources: "2017 Team Ranking". Rivals.

=== 2018 recruiting class ===
College recruiting (2018)
Name	Hometown	School	Height	Weight	Commit date
Tre Jones; PG	Saint Paul, MN	Apple Valley HS	6 ft 1 in (1.85 m)	175 lb (79 kg)	Aug 13, 2017
Tre Jones; PG	Recruit ratings: Scout: Rivals: 247Sports: ESPN: (92)				
Cam Reddish; SF	Norristown, PA	Westtown School	6 ft 7 in (2.01 m)	203 lb (92 kg)	Sep 1, 2017
Cam Reddish; SF	Recruit ratings: Scout: Rivals: 247Sports: ESPN: (96)				
RJ Barrett; SF	Mississauga, ON	Montverde Academy	6 ft 7 in (2.01 m)	200 lb (91 kg)	Nov 10, 2017
RJ Barrett; SF	Recruit ratings: Scout: Rivals: 247Sports: ESPN: (96)				
Zion Williamson; PF	Spartanburg, SC	Spartanburg Day School	6 ft 6 in (1.98 m)	272 lb (123 kg)	Jan 20, 2018
Zion Williamson; PF	Recruit ratings: Scout: Rivals: 247Sports: ESPN: (96)				
Overall recruit ranking:
Note: In many cases, Scout, Rivals, 247Sports, On3, and ESPN may conflict in their listings of height and weight.; In these cases, the average was taken. ESPN grades are on a 100-point scale.; Sources: "2018 Team Ranking". Rivals.

== Roster ==
2017–18 Duke Blue Devils men's basketball team
Players
Coaches

Pos.	#	Name	Height	Weight	Year	Previous school	Hometown
G	1	Trevon Duval	6 ft 3 in (1.91 m)	186 lb (84 kg)	Fr	IMG Academy	Wilmington, Delaware
G	2	Gary Trent Jr.	6 ft 6 in (1.98 m)	209 lb (95 kg)	Fr	Prolific Prep	Apple Valley, Minnesota
G	3	Grayson Allen (C)	6 ft 5 in (1.96 m)	205 lb (93 kg)	Sr	Providence School	Jacksonville, Florida
F	5	Jordan Tucker	6 ft 7 in (2.01 m)	220 lb (100 kg)	Fr	Wheeler	White Plains, New York
F	12	Javin DeLaurier	6 ft 10 in (2.08 m)	231 lb (105 kg)	So	St. Anne's-Belfield School	Charlottesville, Virginia
G	14	Jordan Goldwire	6 ft 2 in (1.88 m)	172 lb (78 kg)	Fr	Norcross HS	Norcross, Georgia
G	15	Alex O'Connell	6 ft 6 in (1.98 m)	171 lb (78 kg)	Fr	Milton HS	Milton, Georgia
C	20	Marques Bolden	6 ft 11 in (2.11 m)	246 lb (112 kg)	So	DeSoto HS	DeSoto, Texas
C	30	Antonio Vrankovic	7 ft 0 in (2.13 m)	269 lb (122 kg)	Jr	Pine Crest School	Delray Beach, Florida
F	34	Wendell Carter Jr.	6 ft 10 in (2.08 m)	259 lb (117 kg)	Fr	Pace Academy	Atlanta, Georgia
F	35	Marvin Bagley III	6 ft 11 in (2.11 m)	234 lb (106 kg)	Fr	Sierra Canyon School	Tempe, Arizona
F	41	Jack White	6 ft 7 in (2.01 m)	226 lb (103 kg)	So	Australian Institute of Sport	Canberra, Australia
G	50	Justin Robinson	6 ft 9 in (2.06 m)	198 lb (90 kg)	RS So	San Antonio Christian	San Antonio, Texas
G	51	Mike Buckmire (W)	6 ft 2 in (1.88 m)	172 lb (78 kg)	Fr	Germantown Friends School	Blue Bell, Pennsylvania
G	53	Brennan Besser (W)	6 ft 5 in (1.96 m)	190 lb (86 kg)	Jr	Latin School	Chicago, Illinois

Head coach

- Mike Krzyzewski

Assistant coach(es)

- Jeff Capel (Assoc. HC)
- Nate James
- Jon Scheyer

Legend

- (C) Team captain
- (S) Suspended
- (I) Ineligible
- (W) Walk-on
- Injured
- Current redshirt

Roster

=== Depth chart ===
Pos.	Starting 5	Bench 1	Bench 2
C	Marvin Bagley III	Marques Bolden	Antonio Vrankovic
PF	Wendell Carter Jr.	Javin DeLaurier	Justin Robinson
SF	Gary Trent Jr.	Jack White
SG	Grayson Allen	Alex O'Connell	Brennan Besser
PG	Trevon Duval	Jordan Goldwire	Mike Buckmire

- December 31, 2017 – Freshman Jordan Tucker transferred from Duke at the end of the fall semester.

== Schedule and results ==
Date time, TV	Rank^{#}	Opponent^{#}	Result	Record	High points	High rebounds	High assists	Site (attendance) city, state
Exhibition
October 27, 2017*; 7:00 pm, ACCN Extra		Northwest Missouri State	W 93–60		23 – Allen	9 – Carter, Jr.	5 – Duval	Cameron Indoor Stadium; Durham, NC
November 4, 2017*; 1:00 pm, ACCN Extra	No. 1	Bowie State	W 116–53	–	25 – Bagley III	14 – Carter, Jr.	11 – Allen	Cameron Indoor Stadium (9,314); Durham, NC
Regular season
November 10, 2017*; 7:00 pm, ACCN Extra	No. 1	Elon	W 97–68	1–0	25 – Bagley III	11 – DeLaurier	8 – Duval	Cameron Indoor Stadium (9,314); Durham, NC
November 11, 2017*; 7:00 pm, ACCN Extra	No. 1	Utah Valley	W 99–69	2–0	24 – Bagley III	10 – Bagley III	12 – Duval	Cameron Indoor Stadium (9,314); Durham, NC
November 14, 2017*; 7:00 pm, ESPN	No. 1	vs. No. 2 Michigan State; Champions Classic	W 88–81	3–0	37 – Allen	12 – Carter, Jr.	10 – Duval	United Center (21,684); Chicago, IL
November 17, 2017*; 7:00 pm, RSN	No. 1	Southern	W 78–61	4–0	20 – Carter, Jr.	11 – Tied	4 – Tied	Cameron Indoor Stadium (9,314); Durham, NC
November 20, 2017*; 7:00 pm, ACCN Extra	No. 1	Furman; Phil Knight Invitational Opening Round	W 92–63	5–0	24 – Bagley III	9 – Carter, Jr.	6 – Allen	Cameron Indoor Stadium (9,314); Durham, NC
November 23, 2017*; 4:30 pm, ESPN	No. 1	vs. Portland State; Phil Knight Invitational Motion quarterfinals	W 99–81	6–0	22 – Duval	15 – Bagley III	9 – Allen	Veterans Memorial Coliseum (6,955); Portland, OR
November 24, 2017*; 5:30 pm, ESPN	No. 1	vs. Texas; Phil Knight Invitational Motion semifinals	W 85–78 ^{OT}	7–0	34 – Bagley III	15 – Bagley III	6 – Duval	Moda Center (13,746); Portland, OR
November 26, 2017*; 10:30 pm, ESPN	No. 1	vs. No. 7 Florida; Phil Knight Invitational Motion Bracket championship	W 87–84	8–0	30 – Bagley III	15 – Bagley III	7 – Allen	Moda Center (15,365); Portland, OR
November 29, 2017*; 9:30 pm, ESPN	No. 1	at Indiana; ACC–Big Ten Challenge	W 91–81	9–0	23 – Bagley III	12 – Carter, Jr.	6 – Duval	Simon Skjodt Assembly Hall (17,222); Bloomington, IN
December 2, 2017*; 3:30 pm, ESPN2	No. 1	South Dakota	W 96–80	10–0	25 – Allen	12 – Bagley III	8 – Duval	Cameron Indoor Stadium (9,314); Durham, NC
December 5, 2017*; 9:00 pm, ESPNU	No. 1	Saint Francis (PA)	W 124–67	11–0	21 – Bagley III	11 – Bagley III	11 – Duval	Cameron Indoor Stadium (9,314); Durham, NC
December 9, 2017; 12:00 pm, ESPN	No. 1	at Boston College	L 84–89	11–1 (0–1)	25 – Trent Jr.	12 – Bagley III	6 – Allen	Conte Forum (8,606); Chestnut Hill, MA
December 20, 2017*; 7:00 pm, ESPN2	No. 4	Evansville	W 104–40	12–1	27 – Carter, Jr.	7 – Bagley III	8 – Duval	Cameron Indoor Stadium (9,314); Durham, NC
December 30, 2017; 2:00 pm, CBS	No. 4	No. 24 Florida State	W 100–93	13–1 (1–1)	32 – Bagley III	21 – Bagley III	6 – Allen	Cameron Indoor Stadium (9,314); Durham, NC
January 6, 2018; 8:00 pm, ESPN	No. 2	at NC State	L 85–96	13–2 (1–2)	31 – Bagley III	10 – Bagley III	5 – Duval	PNC Arena (19,500); Raleigh, NC
January 10, 2018; 7:00 pm, ESPN2	No. 7	at Pittsburgh	W 87–52	14–2 (2–2)	16 – Bagley III	15 – Bagley III	5 – Trent Jr.	Peterson Events Center (9,180); Pittsburgh, PA
January 13, 2018; 12:00 pm, ACCN	No. 7	Wake Forest	W 89–71	15–2 (3–2)	30 – Bagley III	12 – Allen	8 – Allen	Cameron Indoor Stadium (9,314); Durham, NC
January 15, 2018; 7:00 pm, ESPN	No. 5	at No. 25 Miami (FL)	W 83–75	16–2 (4–2)	30 – Trent Jr.	14 – Carter	8 – Duval	Watsco Center (7,972); Coral Gables, FL
January 20, 2018; 4:00 pm, ACCN	No. 5	Pittsburgh	W 81–54	17–2 (5–2)	21 – Carter Jr.	8 – Carter Jr.	4 – Duval	Cameron Indoor Stadium (9,314); Durham, NC
January 23, 2018; 9:00 pm, ACCN	No. 4	at Wake Forest	W 84–70	18–2 (6–2)	23 – Carter Jr.	12 – Carter Jr.	6 – Allen	LJVM Coliseum (13,209); Winston-Salem, NC
January 27, 2018; 2:00 pm, CBS	No. 4	No. 2 Virginia	L 63–65	18–3 (6–3)	30 – Bagley III	15 – Carter Jr.	8 – Duval	Cameron Indoor Stadium (9,314); Durham, NC
January 29, 2018; 7:00 pm, ESPN	No. 4	Notre Dame	W 88–66	19–3 (7–3)	22 – Trent Jr.	10 – Trent Jr.	8 – Allen	Cameron Indoor Stadium (9,314); Durham, NC
February 3, 2018*; 12:00 pm, FOX	No. 4	at St. John's; The Garf	L 77–81	19–4	22 – Trent Jr.	15 – Carter Jr.	5 – Duval	Madison Square Garden (19,812); New York, NY
February 8, 2018; 8:00 pm, ESPN/ACCN	No. 9	at No. 21 North Carolina; Rivalry/ESPN College GameDay	L 78–82	19–5 (7–4)	16 – Trent Jr.	16 – Bagley III	7 – Allen	Dean Smith Center (21,750); Chapel Hill, NC
February 11, 2018; 6:00 pm, ESPN	No. 9	at Georgia Tech	W 80–69	20–5 (8–4)	23 – Allen	10 – Carter Jr.	6 – Allen	McCamish Pavilion (8,600); Atlanta, GA
February 14, 2018; 7:00 pm, ESPN2	No. 12	Virginia Tech	W 74–52	21–5 (9–4)	25 – Allen	13 – Carter Jr.	6 – Allen	Cameron Indoor Stadium (9,314); Durham, NC
February 18, 2018; 1:00 pm, ACCN	No. 12	at No. 11 Clemson	W 66–57	22–5 (10–4)	19 – Allen	10 – Tied	4 – Allen	Littlejohn Coliseum (9,000); Clemson, SC
February 21, 2018; 9:00 pm, ESPN	No. 5	Louisville	W 82–56	23–5 (11–4)	28 – Allen	9 – Carter Jr.	6 – Carter Jr.	Cameron Indoor Stadium (9,314); Durham, NC
February 24, 2018; 6:00 pm, ESPN	No. 5	Syracuse	W 60–44	24–5 (12–4)	19 – Bagley III	10 – Carter Jr.	6 – Allen	Cameron Indoor Stadium (9,314); Durham, NC
February 26, 2018; 7:00 pm, ESPN	No. 5	at Virginia Tech	L 63–64	24–6 (12–5)	22 – Allen	8 – Carter Jr.	4 – Bolden	Cassell Coliseum (9,275); Blacksburg, VA
March 3, 2018; 8:15 pm, ESPN	No. 5	No. 9 North Carolina; Rivalry/College GameDay	W 74–64	25–6 (13–5)	21 – Bagley III	15 – Bagley III	6 – Duval	Cameron Indoor Stadium (9,314); Durham, NC
ACC Tournament
March 8, 2018; 7:00 pm, ESPN	(2) No. 5	vs. (10) Notre Dame; Quarterfinals	W 88–70	26–6	33 – Bagley III	17 – Bagley III	11 – Duval	Barclays Center (17,732); Brooklyn, NY
March 9, 2018; 9:00 pm, ESPN	(2) No. 5	vs. (6) No. 12 North Carolina; Semifinals/Rivalry	L 69–74	26–7	20 – Trent Jr.	13 – Bagley III	7 – Duval	Barclays Center (18,157); Brooklyn, NY
NCAA tournament
March 15, 2018*; 2:45 pm, CBS	(2 MW) No. 9	vs. (15 MW) Iona; First Round	W 89–67	27–7	22 – Bagley III	8 – Carter Jr.	9 – Allen	PPG Paints Arena (18,757); Pittsburgh, PA
March 17, 2018*; 2:40 pm, CBS	(2 MW) No. 9	vs. (7 MW) Rhode Island; Second Round	W 87–62	28–7	22 – Bagley III	9 – Bagley III	7 – Duval	PPG Paints Arena (19,015); Pittsburgh, PA
March 23, 2018; 9:37 pm, CBS	(2 MW) No. 9	vs. (11 MW) Syracuse; Sweet Sixteen	W 69–65	29–7	22 – Bagley III	12 – Carter Jr.	8 – Allen	CenturyLink Center (17,399); Omaha, NE
March 25, 2018*; 5:05 pm, CBS	(2 MW) No. 9	vs. (1 MW) No. 4 Kansas; Elite Eight	L 81–85 ^{OT}	29–8	20 – Duval	10 – Bagley III	6 – Duval	CenturyLink Center (17,579); Omaha, NE
*Non-conference game. ^{#}Rankings from AP Poll. (#) Tournament seedings in parentheses. All times are in Eastern Time.

== Ranking movement ==
Ranking movements Legend: ██ Increase in ranking ██ Decrease in ranking ( ) = First-place votes
	Week																			
Poll	Pre	1	2	3	4	5	6	7	8	9	10	11	12	13	14	15	16	17	18	Final
AP	1 (33)	1 (34)	1 (54)	1 (65)	1 (65)	4	4	4	2 (21)	7	5	4	4	9	12	5	5	5	9	Not released
Coaches	1 (20)	1^ (20)	1 (29)	1 (30)	1 (30)	4	3	3	2 (4)	6	5	4	5	8	10	5	3	6	6	4

^Coaches did not release a Week 2 poll.
*AP does not release post-NCAA Tournament rankings
