= Jordan Goldwire =

American basketball player (born 1999)

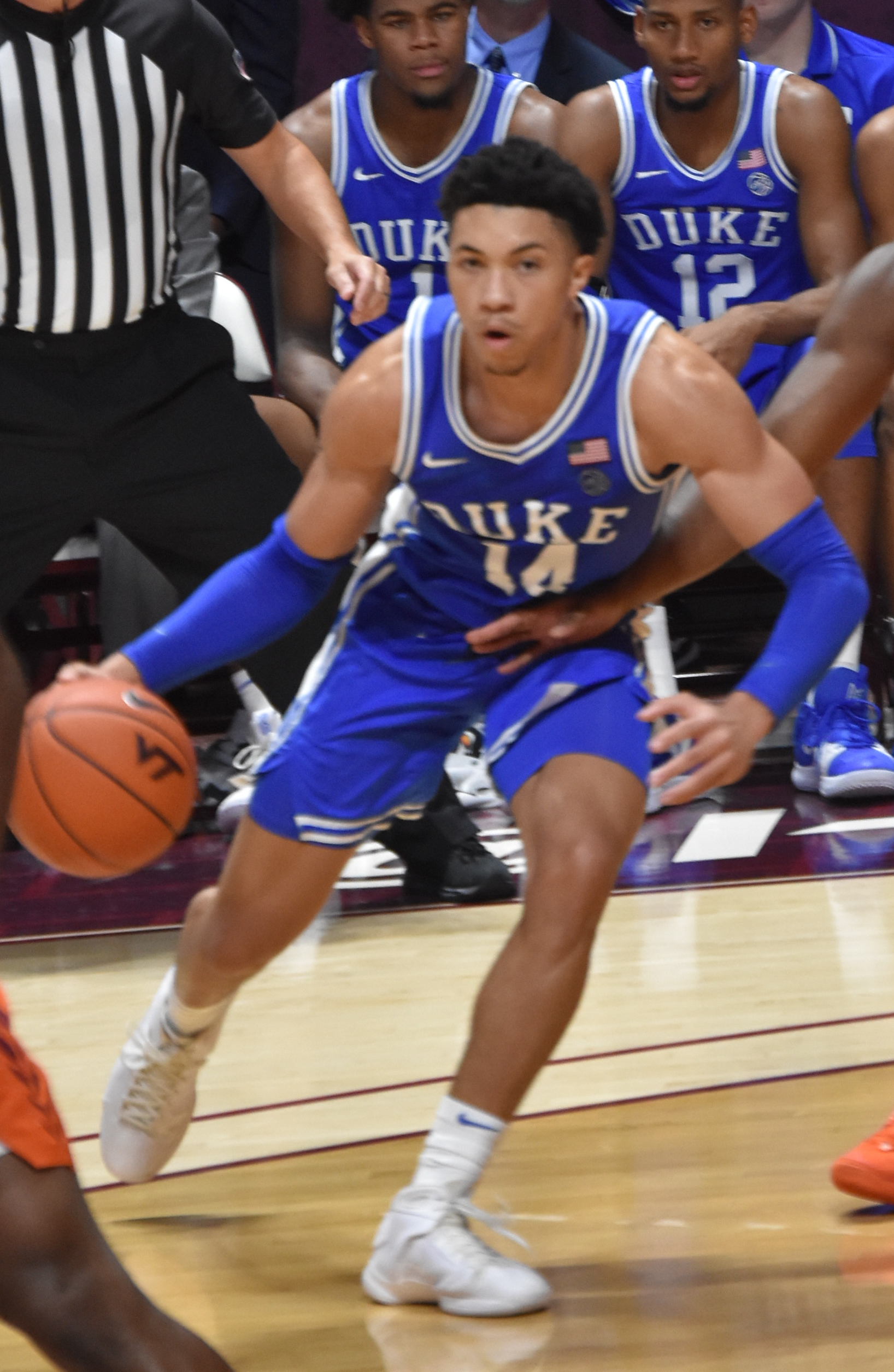
- Goldwire with Duke in 2019

No. 5 – FOG Næstved
- Position: Point guard
- League: Basketligaen

Personal information
- Born: June 18, 1999 (age 27) Lawrenceville, Georgia, U.S.
- Listed height: 6 ft 3 in (1.91 m)
- Listed weight: 194 lb (88 kg)

Career information
- High school: Norcross (Norcross, Georgia)
- College: Duke (2017–2021); Oklahoma (2021–2022)
- NBA draft: 2022: undrafted
- Playing career: 2022–present

Career history
- 2022: Austin Spurs
- 2023: Mornar Barsko zlato
- 2023: Reales de La Vega
- 2023: Halcones de Xalapa
- 2024: Capital City Go-Go
- 2024: Texas Legends
- 2024: Lobos Plateados
- 2024–2025: Metros de Santiago
- 2025–2026: Čačak 94
- 2026–present: FOG Næstved

Career highlights
- LNB Champion (2023); ACC All-Defensive Team (2021)

Jordan Alexander Goldwire (born June 18, 1999) is an American professional basketball player for FOG Næstved of the Danish Basketligaen. He played college basketball for the Duke Blue Devils and Oklahoma Sooners.

== High school career ==
Goldwire played in high school for Norcross High School in Norcross, Georgia. Goldwire played on a talented high school team consisting of Rayshaun Hammonds (Georgia), Lance Thomas (Louisville/Memphis), JoJo Toppin (Georgia/Georgia State), Kyle Sturdivant (USC/Georgia Tech) and Brandon Boston Jr. (Kentucky). Norcross was 26–4 his junior year and 26–6 his senior year losing in the State Championship Game in front a crowd of over 10,000 people at McCamish Pavilion, the arena of Georgia Tech. As a senior, he averaged 12.8 points, 8.3 assists, 2.1 steals per game and was named All Region, All Gwinnett County and All State.

=== Recruiting ===
By the end of his high school career, he was a consensus three-star recruit.

On May 1, 2017, he committed to play college basketball for Duke.

College recruiting
Name	Hometown	School	Height	Weight	Commit date
Jordan Goldwire; PG	Norcross, GA	Norcross (GA)	6 ft 2 in (1.88 m)	170 lb (77 kg)	May 1, 2017
Jordan Goldwire; PG	Recruit ratings: Scout: Rivals: 247Sports: ESPN: (78)				
Overall recruit ranking: Scout: — Rivals: — 247Sports: — ESPN: —
Note: In many cases, Scout, Rivals, 247Sports, On3, and ESPN may conflict in their listings of height and weight.; In these cases, the average was taken. ESPN grades are on a 100-point scale.; Sources: "Duke 2017 Basketball Commitments". Rivals.; "2017 Duke Blue Devils Recruiting Class". ESPN.; "2017 Team Ranking". Rivals.

== College career ==
Goldwire primarily served in a bench role during his first two seasons. By December 2019, his minutes increased with an injury to starting point guard Tre Jones. As a junior, Goldwire started 15 games and averaged 4.7 points, 2.5 rebounds, 2.3 assists, and 1.5 steals per game while shooting 48.7 percent from the floor and 35.4 percent from 3-point range. He posted a season-high 13 points in a win over then-eighth-ranked Florida State.

As a senior, Goldwire averaged 5.8 points, four assists and 2.9 rebounds per game, earning Atlantic Coast Conference (ACC) All-Defensive Team honors. He led the ACC in assist-to-turnover ratio while finishing second in the ACC in steals and seventh in assists. He posted 2+ steals in 19 straight games and became only the third Duke Guard under Coach K to average more than two steals per game for a season. Goldwire graduated with a degree in sociology on May 2, 2021.

With covid allowing for a fifth year of collegiate eligibility, Goldwire decided to pursue a master's degree, transferring to the University of Oklahoma under new coach Porter Moser. At Oklahoma he started 35 games and averaged 10.4 Points, 3.6 Assists, 3.6 Steals, and 2.6 Rebounds and was All-Big 12 Honorable Mention.

During his collegiate career, Goldwire had seasons in which he was ranked in the Top 10 in Steals and Assists in both the ACC and the Big 12.

== Professional career ==
=== Austin Spurs (2022) ===
On October 24, 2022, Goldwire joined the Austin Spurs training camp roster. On December 22, 2022, Goldwire was waived.

=== Mornar Barsko zlato (2023) ===
On January 21, 2023, Goldwire signed with Mornar Barsko zlato of the Montenegrin League.

=== Reales de La Vega (2023) ===
In May 2023, Goldwire signed with the Reales de La Vega of the Liga Nacional de Baloncesto where he won a title.

=== Halcones de Xalapa (2023) ===
On August 18, 2023, Goldwire signed with the Halcones de Xalapa of the Liga Nacional de Baloncesto Profesional.

On October 29, 2023, Goldwire joined the Texas Legends, but was waived on November 9.

=== Capital City Go-Go (2024) ===
On March 9, 2024, Goldwire joined the Capital City Go-Go, but was waived three days later. On March 16, he rejoined Capital City, but was waived six days later.

=== Texas Legends (2024) ===
On March 26, 2024, Goldwire joined the Texas Legends.

=== Lobos Plateados de la BUAP (2024) ===
On June 26, 2024, Goldwire signed with the Lobos Plateados de la BUAP of the Liga Nacional de Baloncesto Profesional.

On October 24, 2024, Goldwire signed with the Greensboro Swarm, but was waived on November 4.

Cacak 94 On January 5 2026 Goldwire signed with Cacak94 Serbia

== Career statistics ==
Legend
GP	Games played	GS	Games started	MPG	Minutes per game
FG%	Field goal percentage	3P%	3-point field goal percentage	FT%	Free throw percentage
RPG	Rebounds per game	APG	Assists per game	SPG	Steals per game
BPG	Blocks per game	PPG	Points per game	**Bold**	Career high

=== College ===
Year	Team	GP	GS	MPG	FG%	3P%	FT%	RPG	APG	SPG	BPG	PPG
2017–18	Duke	26	0	6.5	.321	.263	**.750**	.5	.9	.3	.0	1.0
2018–19	Duke	**35**	0	8.6	.273	.120	.500	.8	.7	.6	.0	.9
2019–20	Duke	31	**15**	24.1	**.487**	**.354**	.636	2.5	2.3	1.5	**.2**	4.7
2020–21	Duke	24	12	**28.5**	.379	.333	.737	**2.9**	**4.0**	**2.2**	.1	**5.8**
Career		116	27	16.4	.399	.295	.667	1.6	1.8	1.1	.1	2.9
