= Jo Baker =

Jo Baker may refer to:

- Jo Baker (make-up artist) (born 1980), English make-up artist
- Jo Baker (novelist) (born 1973), British writer
- Jo Baker (singer) (1948–1996), American vocalist and songwriter

== See also ==
- Joseph Baker (disambiguation)
- Josephine Baker (disambiguation)
