= Joey Baker =

American basketball player

No. 24 – Joondalup Wolves
- Position: Small forward / shooting guard
- League: NBL1 West

Personal information
- Born: September 13, 2000 (age 26) Fayetteville, North Carolina, U.S.
- Listed height: 6 ft 7 in (2.01 m)
- Listed weight: 205 lb (93 kg)

Career information
- High school: Trinity Christian School (Fayetteville, North Carolina)
- College: Duke (2018–2022); Michigan (2022–2023)
- NBA draft: 2023: undrafted
- Playing career: 2023–present

Career history
- 2023–2024: Pieno žvaigždės Pasvalys
- 2024–2025: Grand Rapids Gold
- 2025: Joondalup Wolves
- 2025-present: KK Borac Zemun

Joseph William Baker (born September 13, 2000) is an American professional basketball player for the Joondalup Wolves of the NBL1 West. He played college basketball for the Duke Blue Devils and the Michigan Wolverines. Baker was a four-star recruit in high school and the number 3 player in North Carolina according to ESPN.

== High school career ==
Baker attended Trinity Christian School in Fayetteville, North Carolina.

=== Recruiting ===
Baker was a four-star recruit and one of the top players in the 2019 class, before reclassifying to the 2018 class. He was ranked No.41 overall recruit in the class of 2018.

College recruiting
Name	Hometown	School	Height	Weight	Commit date
Joey Baker; SF	Fayetteville, NC	Trinity Christian School (NC)	6 ft 7 in (2.01 m)	190 lb (86 kg)	Oct 29, 2017
Joey Baker; SF	Recruit ratings: Rivals: 247Sports: ESPN: (89)				
Overall recruit ranking: Rivals: 48 247Sports: 33 ESPN: 41
Note: In many cases, Scout, Rivals, 247Sports, On3, and ESPN may conflict in their listings of height and weight.; In these cases, the average was taken. ESPN grades are on a 100-point scale.; Sources: "Duke 2018 Basketball Commitments". Rivals.; "2018 Duke Blue Devils Recruiting Class". ESPN.; "18 Team Ranking". Rivals.

== College career ==
=== Duke (2018–2022) ===
==== Freshman season (2018–19) ====
On October 29, 2017, Baker committed to playing college basketball for the Duke Blue Devils over offers from Kansas, Tennessee and UCLA. Baker would join a recruiting class that featured future NBA players RJ Barrett, Cam Reddish, and Zion Williamson, as well as Tre Jones for the 2018–19 Duke Blue Devils men's basketball team. During his freshman year, Baker was set to redshirt for the entire season, until coach Mike Krzyzewski put him into the game against Syracuse to fill in for the injured Williamson on February 23, 2019.

==== Sophomore season (2019–20) ====
On December 19, 2019, Baker put up a career high in points scored with 22 against the Wofford Terriers.

==== Junior season (2020–21) ====
As a junior, Baker appeared in 23 games only averaging 2.9 points and 1.2 rebounds per game.

==== Senior season (2021–22) ====
On October 11, 2021, Baker was named team captain alongside Wendell Moore Jr. for the 2021–22 season. As a senior, Baker averaged 4.5 points and 1.2 rebound per game. On May 8, 2022, Baker completed his undergraduate degree in Political Science and graduated from Duke University.

=== Michigan (2022–2023) ===
On June 18, 2022, Baker transferred to the University of Michigan as a graduate transfer for his final year of college basketball eligibility. During the offseason Baker had offseason hip surgery. Baker didn't celebrate senior night with the 2021–22 Duke Blue Devils, because he anticipated playing his fifth year there, but he did celebrate it with the 2022–23 Michigan Wolverines on February 26 against Wisconsin. In the opening round of the 2023 National Invitation Tournament, against Toledo on March 14, 2023, Baker posted season-highs in points (21), field goals made (eight), and three-pointers made (five) on 8–11 shooting. Following the game, he announced that he was pursuing a retroactive redshirt from his freshman season in 2018–19. Baker later decided to hire an agent and pursue professional opportunities.

== Professional career ==
=== Pieno žvaigždės Pasvalys (2023–2024) ===
After going undrafted in the 2023 NBA draft, Baker signed his first professional contract with Pieno žvaigždės Pasvalys of the Lithuanian Basketball League (LKL) on September 14, 2023. He left the team in February 2024 after appearing in 14 games, where he averaged 5.4 points per game.

=== Grand Rapids Gold (2024–2025) ===
In March 2024, Baker joined the Grand Rapids Gold of the NBA G League for the rest of the 2023–24 season. In nine games, he averaged 4.6 points and 1.4 rebounds per game.

In October 2024, Baker re-joined the Gold for the 2024–25 NBA G League season. In 19 games, he averaged 3.9 points and 1.2 rebounds per game.

=== Joondalup Wolves (2025) ===
In March 2025, Baker signed with the Joondalup Wolves of the NBL1 West in Australia for the 2025 season.

=== KK Borac Zemun (2025-2026) ===
In October 2025, Baker signed with the KK Borac Zemun of the KLS in Serbia for the 2025-26 season

== Career statistics ==
Legend
GP	Games played	GS	Games started	MPG	Minutes per game
FG%	Field goal percentage	3P%	3-point field goal percentage	FT%	Free throw percentage
RPG	Rebounds per game	APG	Assists per game	SPG	Steals per game
BPG	Blocks per game	PPG	Points per game	**Bold**	Career high

=== College ===
Year	Team	GP	GS	MPG	FG%	3P%	FT%	RPG	APG	SPG	BPG	PPG
2018–19	Duke	4	0	4.5	.250	**.500**	.000	1.0	0.0	0.0	**0.3**	0.8
2019–20	Duke	28	3	12.1	.410	.394	**.917**	0.9	**0.8**	**0.5**	0.2	5.0
2020–21	Duke	23	1	11.5	.310	.314	.750	1.2	0.4	0.3	**0.3**	2.9
2021–22	Duke	**34**	0	11.9	**.432**	.405	.778	1.2	0.4	0.4	0.0	4.5
2022–23	Michigan	**34**	**5**	**16.4**	.393	.391	.686	**2.2**	0.4	0.4	0.2	**5.7**
Career		123	9	12.9	.393	.383	.756	1.4	0.5	0.4	0.2	4.5

== Personal life ==
His father, Michael Baker, served in the United States Army. His mother, Jennifer Baker, is a Special Education teacher.
