= Josephine Baker (disambiguation) =

Josephine Baker (1906–1975) was an American-born French entertainer and activist.

Josephine Baker may also refer to:

- Ella Josephine Baker, (1903-1986), civil rights activist
- Sara Josephine Baker, (1873–1945), American physician
- Josephine Baker (1854–1918), American actress and wife of John Drew Jr.

== See also ==
- Jo Baker (disambiguation)
