= Joe Baker (footballer, born 1977) =

English footballer (b. 1977)

Personal information
- Full name: Joseph Philip Baker
- Date of birth: 19 April 1977
- Place of birth: Kentish Town, London
- Position: Right winger

Youth career
- Chelsea
- Charlton Athletic

Senior career*
Years	Team	Apps	(Gls)
1995–1999	Leyton Orient	75	(3)
- Sutton United
- Billericay Town
- * Club domestic league appearances and goals

Joseph Philip Baker is an English former professional footballer who played as a right winger for Leyton Orient in the Football League in the late 1990s.

Baker was born in Kentish Town, London, on 19 April 1977. He came through the youth ranks at Chelsea and Charlton Athletic before signing for Leyton Orient in May 1995. He started only 23 games in the Football League but made 52 appearances as a substitute, scoring three goals. He was never able to pin down a starting place in the first team and after five seasons, he was released by Orient in October 1999 and dropped into non-league football with Sutton United and Billericay Town for whom he made over 100 appearances.

== Career statistics ==
Source: Kaufman, Neilson N; Ravenhill, Alan E (2002). The Men Who Made Leyton Orient Football Club. Tempus Publishing. pp. 25–26. ISBN 0752424122.

Appearances and goals by club, season and competition
Club	Season	League			FA Cup		League Cup	
Club	Season	Division	Apps	Goals	Apps	Goals	Apps	Goals
Leyton Orient	1995–96	Third Division	20	0	1	0	2	0
Leyton Orient	1996–97	Third Division	20	0	1	0	0	0
Leyton Orient	1997–98	Third Division	31	3	2	0	2	2
Leyton Orient	1998–99	Third Division	4	0	1	0	0	0
Leyton Orient	1999–00	Third Division	0	0	0	0	0	0
Total			75	3	5	0	4	2
