= Jo Baker (make-up artist) =

English make-up artist

- Born: Jo Baker; 21 March 1981 (age 45); Barnet, London, England
- Occupations: Make-up artist, Entrepeneur
- Years active: 26
- Website: https://bakeupbeauty.com https://jobaker.com/

Jo Baker (born 21 March 1980) is a Los Angeles based English makeup artist and beauty entrepreneur. She is known for her celebrity red-carpet and editorial makeup work and for co-founding Bakeup Beauty, a digital-first beauty brand launched in 2022. Jo is also a Beauty Editor for Treats! Magazine.

== Life ==
Born and raised in London, Jo Baker started her career as a make-up artist in 2000, on the runways of London and Paris and was soon selected by Usher to be part of a world tour that would eventually take her to California.

After relocating to Los Angeles full-time in 2005, her portfolio expanded to a list of clients encompassing actors, record companies, ad agencies, photographers, still producers, and recording artists. With work being featured in Treats! Magazine, O, The Hollywood Reporter, Glamour, Italian Vanity Fair, W, Cosmo, and Russian Vogue, as well as collaborations with major brands including Apple, Nike, Marc Jacobs and J Brand, she appeared in the 2013 feature length, documentary film Chasing Beauty, chronicling a behind the scenes look at the modeling industry.

Baker's celebrity clients include Lucy Boynton, Julianne Hough, Mariah Carey, Dove Cameron, Jennifer Lawrence, Lili Reinhart, Florence Pugh, Yara Shahidi, Naya Rivera, Natalie Portman, Emmy Rossum, Jessica Chastain, Sharon Stone, Milla Jovovich, George Clooney, Robin Thicke, Cindy Crawford, Shailene Woodley, Steven Tyler, Queen Latifah, Robin Wright, January Jones, Miley Cyrus, Annie Lennox, Margaret Pugh, Mackenzie Davis, Lilliya Scarlett, Eiza González, Paris Jackson, and many others.

In 2022, Baker co-founded the beauty brand Bakeup (later Bakeup Beauty) alongside musician Grace Gaustad, Philosophy founder Cristina Carlino, It Cosmetics executive Christine Nevin and Sarah Superfon. Baker serves as the brand's chief beauty officer.
