= Joseph Baker (pirate) =

18th-century Canadian pirate

Joseph Baker [Joseph Boulanger] (Born 1779; died May 9, 1800) was a Canadian pirate, known primarily for the failed mutiny and hijacking of the merchant schooner Eliza in 1800.

== Life ==
Although little is known of his early life, Baker signed aboard the West Indies-bound merchant schooner Eliza in Philadelphia, Pennsylvania. Soon after leaving port, Baker seized control of the ship with two other crewmen, Peter LaCroix and Joseph Berrouse, attacking the first mate during night watch and throwing him overboard. Wounding the Captain, a William Wheland, the three held him hostage while they discussed how to sell the cargo. As none of the sailors were able to navigate the ship, they accepted an offer from Wheland to sail them to the "Spanish Main" so they could rendezvous with other pirates in order to sell the cargo at a port.

Although promising to spare Wheland's life in exchange for sailing the ship to a haven, Baker reportedly bragged to LaCroix and Berrouse that he planned to kill him once in sight of land. After a time however, Wheland managed to surprise his captors, locking LaCroix and Berrouse in the ship's hold when they were below decks taking inventory of the ship's cargo. Sneaking up behind Baker, who was at the wheel, Wheland chased Baker up the mainmast and forced him to lash himself to the mast.

Sailing into Saint Kitts, Wheland turned the mutineers over to the American naval authorities, who transported the three on USS Ganges back to Philadelphia. There, a United States circuit court tried them for murder and piracy. The court convened from April 21–25, 1800 and sentenced all three prisoners to death by hanging. The executions took place on May 9, reportedly to the cheers of the large number of spectators.
