= Jack White (basketball) =

Australian basketball player (born 1997)

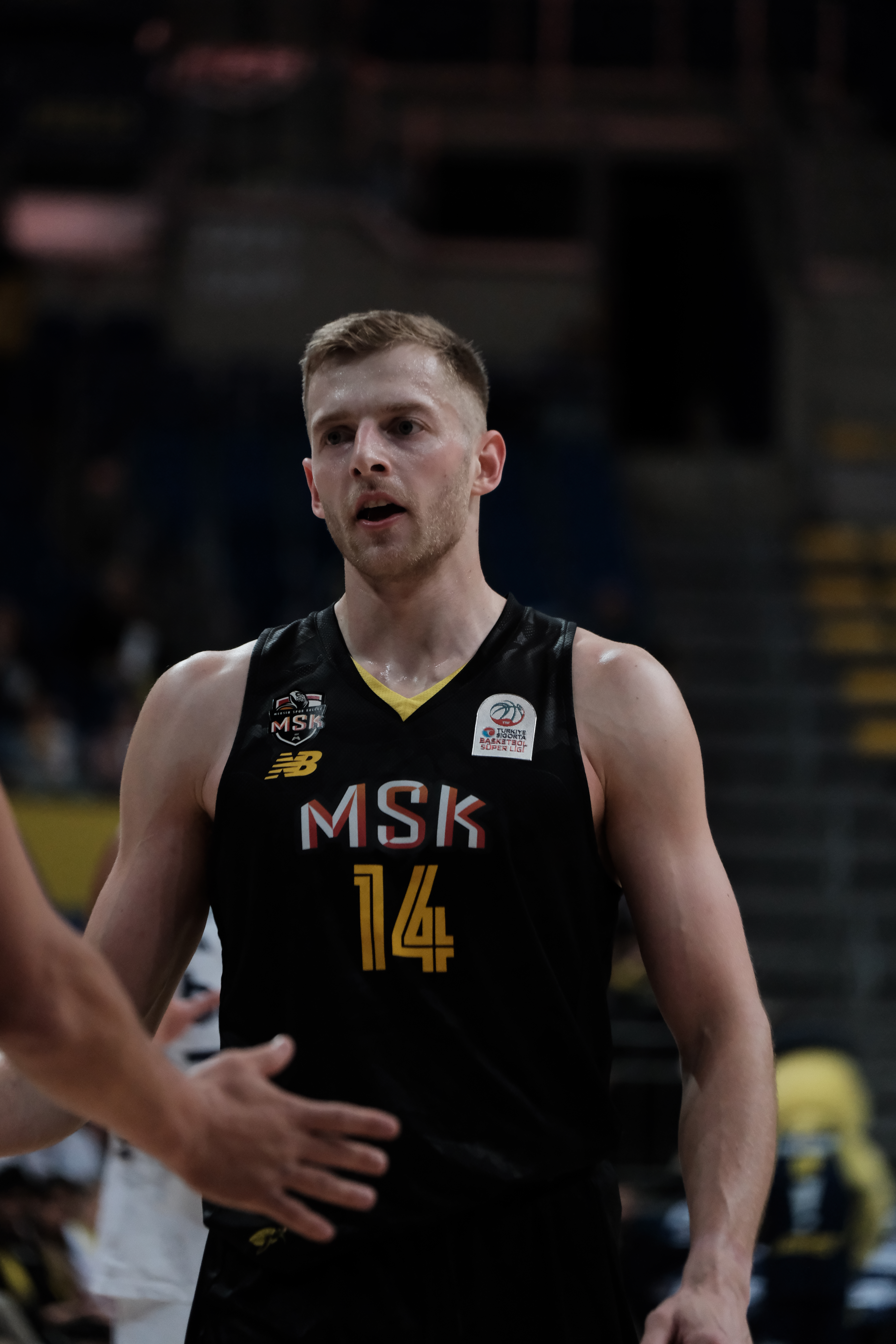
- White with Mersin MSK in 2026

No. 14 – Napoli Basket
- Position: Small forward / power forward
- League: LBA; EuroCup

Personal information
- Born: 5 August 1997 (age 29) Traralgon, Victoria, Australia
- Listed height: 200 cm (6 ft 7 in)
- Listed weight: 102 kg (225 lb)

Career information
- High school: Lake Ginninderra (Canberra, ACT)
- College: Duke (2016–2020)
- NBA draft: 2020: undrafted
- Playing career: 2014–present

Career history
- 2014–2016: BA Centre of Excellence
- 2016: Cairns Taipans
- 2020–2022: Melbourne United
- 2022: Geelong Supercats
- 2022–2023: Denver Nuggets
- 2022–2023: →Grand Rapids Gold
- 2023–2024: South Bay Lakers
- 2024: Memphis Grizzlies
- 2024–2025: Melbourne United
- 2025: Bayern Munich
- 2025–2026: Mersin MSK
- 2026–present: Napoli

Career highlights
- NBA champion (2023); Bundesliga champion (2025); NBL champion (2021)
- Stats at NBA.com
- Stats at Basketball Reference
Medals
Men's basketball
Representing Australia
FIBA Asia Cup
Gold medal – first place	2025 Saudi Arabia
FIBA Under-17 World Cup
Silver medal – second place	2014 United Arab Emirates	Team
Universiade
Bronze medal – third place	2019 Italy

Jackson Thomas White (born 5 August 1997) is an Australian professional basketball player for Napoli of the Italian Lega Basket Serie A (LBA) and the EuroCup. He played four seasons of college basketball for the Duke Blue Devils before debuting in the National Basketball League (NBL) in 2020 for Melbourne United. After two seasons in the NBL, he debuted in the NBA in 2022 for the Denver Nuggets and won an NBA championship while part of the Nuggets roster in 2023.

== Early life and career ==
White was born in Traralgon, Victoria. He grew up playing for the Latrobe City Energy.

In 2014, White had a one-game stint with the BA Centre of Excellence in the South East Australian Basketball League (SEABL). He continued with the Centre of Excellence in the SEABL over the next two years, playing 13 games in 2015 and four games in 2016.

While at the Australian Institute of Sport in Canberra, White attended Lake Ginninderra College. He helped Lake Ginninderra win the national title at the 2015 Australian schools championships alongside teammate Dejan Vasiljevic.

In January 2016, White signed with the Cairns Taipans of the National Basketball League (NBL) to a development-player deal. He made his NBL debut on 15 January against Melbourne United, playing four minutes.

== College career ==
In 2016, White moved to the United States to play college basketball for the Duke Blue Devils.

As a freshman in 2016–17, White played in 10 games and averaged 2.1 points and 1.3 rebounds in 6.1 minutes per game. As a sophomore in 2017–18, he played in 28 games and averaged 1.5 rebounds in 5.7 minutes per game.

Prior to his junior year, White was named team captain. In 2018–19, he appeared in a career-best 35 games and made three starts. He totaled career highs in minutes (20.4), rebounds (4.7), and points (4.1) per game. He registered career highs in 3-pointers made (4-for-6) and points (12) against Clemson on 5 January 2019. He earned ACC All-Academic selection.

As a senior in 2019–20, White played in 30 games with seven starts, averaging 3.1 points and 2.9 rebounds in 15.6 minutes per game. He again served as team captain and was again named to the ACC All-Academic team.

== Professional career ==
=== Melbourne United (2020–2022) ===
After going undrafted in the 2020 NBA draft, White signed a three-year deal with Melbourne United of the NBL on 15 July 2020. In April 2021, he suffered a season-ending Achilles injury. United went on to win the NBL championship in the 2020–21 season.

White returned to action for United in December 2021.

Following the 2021–22 NBL season, White had a four-game stint with the Geelong Supercats of the NBL1 South, averaging 20 points and 12.5 rebounds per game.

=== Denver Nuggets (2022–2023) ===
In July 2022, White played for the Denver Nuggets in NBA Summer League and signed a two-way contract with the Nuggets for the 2022–23 season. He played the majority of the season with the Grand Rapids Gold in the NBA G League, averaging 20.9 points, 9.6 boards, 0.9 steals and 0.8 blocks per game in 14 games. With the Nuggets, he averaged 1.2 points and 1.0 rebounds in 17 games. He scored an NBA season high of seven points on 25 February 2023 against the Memphis Grizzlies. He wasn't elevated to the main roster before the playoffs, meaning he couldn't receive any court time in the postseason as the Nuggets won the NBA championship with a 4–1 win over the Miami Heat in the 2023 NBA Finals.

On 20 July 2023, White signed with the Oklahoma City Thunder, but was waived on 22 October, during the final roster cuts.

=== South Bay Lakers (2023–2024) ===
On 28 October 2023, White was drafted by the Texas Legends with the number one overall pick in the 2023 NBA G League Draft. His rights were traded to the South Bay Lakers a few hours later, joining the team afterwards. He averaged nine points and 6.1 rebounds across 22 appearances for South Bay during the 2023–24 season.

=== Memphis Grizzlies (2024) ===
On 9 April 2024, White signed a 10-day contract with the Memphis Grizzlies. He played four games for the Grizzlies.

=== Return to Melbourne (2024–2025) ===
On 15 May 2024, White signed a two-year deal with Melbourne United, returning to the franchise for a second stint. Following the 2024–25 NBL season, he declined his player option with the club to become a free agent.

=== Bayern Munich (2025) ===
On 1 April 2025, White signed with Bayern Munich of the Basketball Bundesliga for the rest of the 2024–25 season.

In July 2025, White joined the Atlanta Hawks for the 2025 NBA Summer League.

=== Mersin MSK (2025–2026) ===
On 7 August 2025, White signed with Mersin MSK of the Turkish Basketbol Süper Ligi.

=== Napoli Basket (2026–present) ===
On 7 July 2026, White signed with Napoli of the Italian Lega Basket Serie A (LBA).

== National team career ==
White debuted for Australia at the 2013 FIBA Oceania U16 Championship. He played at the 2014 FIBA Oceania U18 Championship and then won a silver medal at the 2014 FIBA Under-17 World Championship in Dubai. At the 2015 FIBA Under-19 World Championship in Heraklion, White averaged 8.3 points and 3.9 rebounds per game.

In 2019, White helped the Australia national university team win bronze at the Summer Universiade in Italy.

White made his Australian Boomers debut during the 2023 FIBA World Cup Asian qualifiers. In July 2022, he had 16 points and 14 rebounds in a game against China. He played for the Boomers at the 2023 FIBA Basketball World Cup.

In July 2025, White was named in the Boomers squad in the lead up to the 2025 FIBA Asia Cup in Saudi Arabia.

In October 2025, White was named in the Boomers squad for the first window of the FIBA Basketball World Cup 2027 Asian Qualifiers. In February 2026, he was named in the squad for two more Asian qualifiers. In November 2026, he was named in the squad for two more Asian qualifiers.

== Career statistics ==
Legend
GP	Games played	GS	Games started	MPG	Minutes per game
FG%	Field goal percentage	3P%	3-point field goal percentage	FT%	Free throw percentage
RPG	Rebounds per game	APG	Assists per game	SPG	Steals per game
BPG	Blocks per game	PPG	Points per game	**Bold**	Career high
†	Won an NBA championship

=== NBA ===
==== Regular season ====
Year	Team	GP	GS	MPG	FG%	3P%	FT%	RPG	APG	SPG	BPG	PPG
2022–23^{†}	Denver	**17**	0	3.9	**.421**	**.333**	.667	1.0	.2	.2	.1	1.2
2023–24	Memphis	4	0	**15.9**	.125	.200	—	**3.0**	**.3**	**1.0**	**.3**	**1.5**
Career		21	0	6.2	.286	.263	.667	1.4	.2	.3	.1	1.3

=== College ===
Year	Team	GP	GS	MPG	FG%	3P%	FT%	RPG	APG	SPG	BPG	PPG
2016–17	Duke	10	0	6.1	**.667**	**.500**	.800	1.3	.1	.1	.2	2.1
2017–18	Duke	28	0	5.7	.409	.167	**1.000**	1.5	.3	.3	.2	.8
2018–19	Duke	**35**	3	**20.5**	.359	.278	.852	**4.7**	.7	.6	**1.1**	**4.1**
2019–20	Duke	30	**7**	15.6	.388	.327	.722	2.9	**.8**	**.7**	.7	3.1
Career		103	10	13.6	.384	.288	.807	3.0	.6	.5	.7	2.7

== Personal life ==
White is the son of Jeff and Rachel White. He has a twin brother, Ben, and a sister, Emma.
