= Joseph Baker (politician) =

American politician

Joseph A. Baker (born 1959) is a Republican politician who was elected to and serves in the Vermont House of Representatives. He represents the Rutland-1-2 Representative District.
