= Nate James (basketball) =

American basketball player and coach

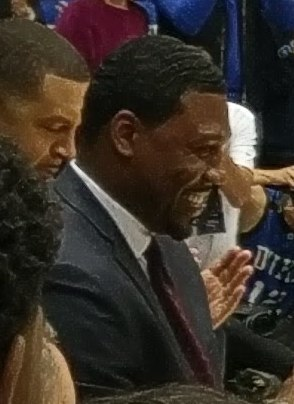

Howard Bison
- Title: Assistant coach
- Conference: Mid-Eastern Athletic Conference

Personal information
- Born: August 7, 1977 (age 49) Detroit, Michigan, U.S.
- Listed height: 6 ft 6 in (1.98 m)
- Listed weight: 200 lb (91 kg)

Career information
- High school: Saint John's Catholic Prep (Frederick, Maryland)
- College: Duke (1996–2001)
- NBA draft: 2001: undrafted
- Playing career: 2001–2008
- Position: Shooting guard / small forward
- Coaching career: 2009–present

Career history

Playing
- 2003: Hickory Nutz
- 2003: Sta. Lucia Realtors
- 2003–2004: Kaposvári KK
- 2003–2004: Anjou BC
- 2004: KK Siroki Hercegtisak
- 2005: Pitagoras/Minas
- 2005–2006: EiffelTowers
- 2006–2007: Toyama Grouses
- 2007–2008: Basket Kwidzyn

Coaching
- 2009–2012; 2013–2018: Duke (assistant)
- 2018–2021: Duke (associate HC)
- 2021–2023: Austin Peay
- 2025–present: Howard (associate HC)

Career highlights
- As Player: Dutch League champion (2006); Bosnian and Herzegovinan League champion (2004); Bosnian and Herzegovinan Cup champion (2004); Hungarian League champion (2004); Hungarian Cup champion (2004); NCAA champion (2001); Third-team All-ACC (2001); McDonald's All-American (1996); As Assistant Coach: 2× NCAA champion (2010, 2015); 5× ACC tournament champion (2009–2011, 2017, 2019)

Nathaniel Drake James Jr. (born August 7, 1977) is an American former basketball player and former head coach at Austin Peay State University. He played college basketball for the Duke Blue Devils.

== College career ==
James, a 6-foot-6-inch (1.98 m) swingman out of Saint John's at Prospect Hall, played for coach Mike Krzyzewski at Duke from 1996 to 2001. After appearing sparingly as a freshman, James suffered a medical redshirt in his sophomore season after six games. Returning in the 1998–99 season, James became a key reserve for the Blue Devils' 1999 Final Four team, averaging 5.0 points and 2.6 rebounds in 14.7 minutes per game.

In his junior year, James was named co-captain of the 1999–2000 team with Chris Carrawell and Shane Battier. He also moved into the starting lineup and upped his averages to 11.0 points and 4.5 rebounds per game. As a senior, James was again named co-captain and led the Blue Devils to the 2001 NCAA championship. He was named third team All-Atlantic Coast Conference and tallied 12.3 points and 5.2 rebounds per game for the Blue Devils. During his time at Duke, James scored 1,116 points and due to his redshirt year became the first player in ACC history to be a member of five regular-season conference championships.

== Professional career ==
Following the close of his college career, James was not drafted by the National Basketball Association. After stints with the Summer League teams of the Washington Wizards and Sacramento Kings, he embarked on an international career. James' career would take him to the Philippines, France, Japan, Bosnia, the Netherlands, Brazil, Hungary and Poland. James was a part of league championship teams in the Netherlands and Hungary.

== Coaching career ==
In 2008, James retired from basketball and took a role as assistant strength and conditioning coach at his alma mater. Following the departure of assistant Johnny Dawkins to Stanford, James was elevated to a full assistant role for the 2009–10 season. Duke went on to win the 2010 national championship, making James the first person to win championships at Duke as both a player and as a coach. James would stay on as a full assistant for another season before moving to a special assistant role as former Blue Devil Jeff Capel joined the staff. On March 27, 2013, head coach Mike Krzyzewski announced James would be moving back to the bench, naming him an assistant coach for the 2013–14 season, following the announcement that Associate Head Coach Chris Collins would leave the Blue Devils at end of the season to become the head coach at Northwestern University.

Following the departure of associate head coach Jeff Capel to become the head coach at the University of Pittsburgh at the end of the 2018 season, James was promoted to co-associate head coach along with Jon Scheyer.

On April 2, 2021, James was appointed as the head coach of the Austin Peay Governors, replacing Matt Figger. He accumulated a 21–39 record during two seasons with the Governors. On March 5, 2023, James was fired as head coach.

James joined the Howard University men's basketball program as associate head coach in October 2025.

== Head coaching record ==
Record table
Season	Team	Overall	Conference	Standing	Postseason
Austin Peay Governors (Ohio Valley Conference) (2021–2022)
2021–22	Austin Peay	12–17	8–10	T–5th	
Austin Peay Governors (ASUN Conference) (2022–2023)
2022–23	Austin Peay	9–22	3–15	14th	
Austin Peay:		21–39 (.350)	11–25 (.306)		
Total:		21–39 (.350)			
National champion Postseason invitational champion Conference regular season champion Conference regular season and conference tournament champion Division regular season champion Division regular season and conference tournament champion Conference tournament champion
