= St. Anne's-Belfield School =

School in Charlottesville, Virginia, US

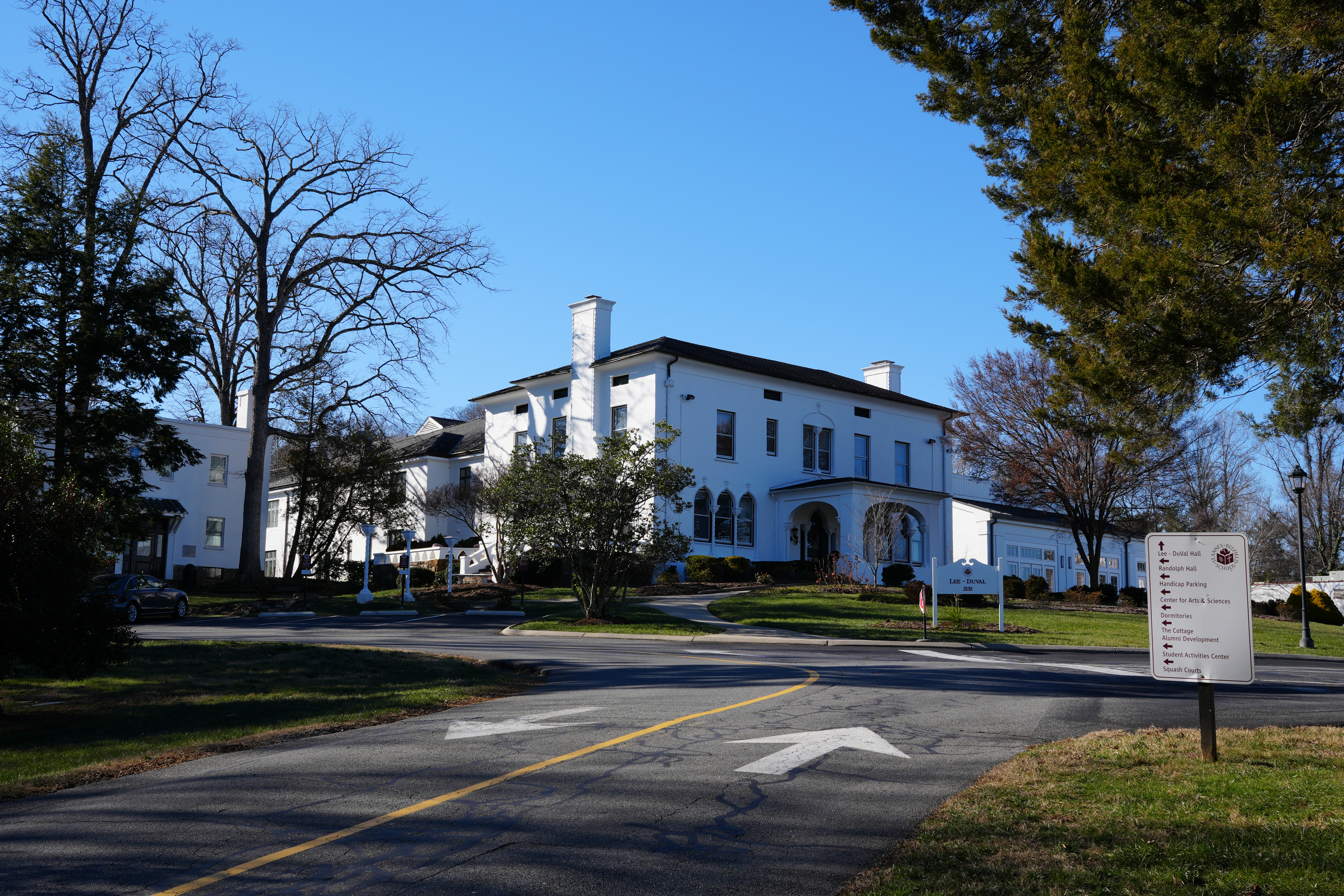

Location
- 2132 Ivy Road; Charlottesville, Virginia 22903; United States; 38°2′33.2″N 78°30′55.2″W

Information
- Type: Independent; college-preparatory; day; boarding
- Motto: Body. Mind. Heart. Soul.
- Religious affiliation: Nonsectarian
- Established: 1910
- Head of School: Autumn A. Graves
- Faculty: 116
- Grades: PreK–12
- Gender: Co-educational
- Enrollment: 885
- Average class size: 13
- Student to teacher ratio: 8:1
- Campus size: 49 acres (20 ha)
- Campus type: Rural
- Colors: Maroon, white, and black
- Athletics: Cross Country, Swimming, Men's Soccer, Women's Soccer, Men's Lacrosse, Women's Lacrosse, Football, Tennis, Field Hockey, Volleyball, Squash, Baseball, Softball, Men's Basketball, Women's Basketball, Golf, Diving
- Athletics conference: Virginia Independent Schools Athletic Association (VISAA)
- Mascot: Saint
- Nickname: Saints
- Accreditation: VAIS; NAIS; SAIS
- Tuition: Lower school (K–4): $29,900; Middle school (5–8): $32,900; Upper school day students (9–12): $36,400; Upper school residential students (9–12): $73,670
- Website: stab.org

St. Anne's-Belfield School is an independent, boarding and day school for pre-kindergarten through 12th grade. The school is located on 49 acres (20 ha) in Charlottesville, Virginia, United States, near the campus of the University of Virginia.

== History ==
The goal of its founders was to provide for their daughters the academic opportunities offered to their sons by the University of Virginia. In 1910 the Reverend Henry B. Lee, Rector of Christ Episcopal Church, persuaded his vestry to purchase the institute. Reopened as St. Anne's School, it became part of the Episcopal diocese system and continued at its downtown location until 1939, when it was moved to the present upper and middle school campus. In 1985, the school became independent of the diocese.

Like St. Anne's, the coeducational elementary school's origins were downtown, where in 1911 Miss Nancy Gordon opened a primary school known first as Miss Nancy's and then as Stonefield. After her death, it was merged with University Country Day School (the Bellair School) and renamed The Belfield School in 1957.

In 1975, after a five-year trial period, St. Anne's and Belfield officially merged. The school has an honor system ( “A student is not to lie, cheat or steal.”) and weekly chapel services.

== Accreditation and affiliations ==
Accreditation:

- The Virginia Association of Independent Schools

Affiliations:

- The Association of Boarding Schools
- The Council for Advancement and Support of Education
- The Educational Records Bureau
- The National Association of College Admission Counselors
- The National Association of Independent Schools
- The Secondary School Admission Test Board

== Campus ==
St. Anne's-Belfield School is a college preparatory school located on two campuses totaling 49 acres (20 ha) of land. The Greenway Rise Campus, located on Ivy Road, is home to the Upper School (grades 9th to 12th), as well as the Administrative, Arts, and Alumni/Development buildings. These buildings, located on the Upper School campus, include the James F. Scott Center For Arts & Science, Randolph Hall & Annex and the Lee-DuVal Hall. The Belfield Campus is home to the Lower School (pre-kindergarten to fourth grade), Middle School (grades 5th to 8th), the Conway Convocation Center, the Tarring Gym, and the athletic fields. St. Anne's-Belfield has six buildings housing its 97 classrooms (including three computer labs and eight science labs), two libraries, and three gymnasiums on two campuses which total 49 acres (20 ha). Recent additions include a 105,000-square-foot (9,800 m^{2}) Learning Village, a squash court complex, and a state-of-the-art turf athletic field.

== Notable alumni ==
- Javin DeLaurier (born 1998) - basketball player in the Israeli Basketball Premier League
- Schuyler Fisk – singer, songwriter, and actress; daughter of actress Sissy Spacek
- Nat Friedman - technology executive; former CEO of GitHub
- Kyle Long – Retired football player for the Kansas City Chiefs
- Tessa Majors – student at Barnard College and victim of a widely publicized murder
- Tom Perriello – Former U.S. Representative for Virginia's 5th congressional district
- Connor Shellenberger - Professional lacrosse player for the New York Atlas
- Anne-Marie Slaughter – scholar, lawyer, government official
- Matthew Swift – entrepreneur; Co-founder, chairman and CEO of the nonprofit Concordia Summit
- Aaron Stinnie — Football player for the Tampa Bay Buccaneers
- Chris Long - Football player for the Philadelphia Eagles
