= Tre Jones =

American basketball player (born 2000)

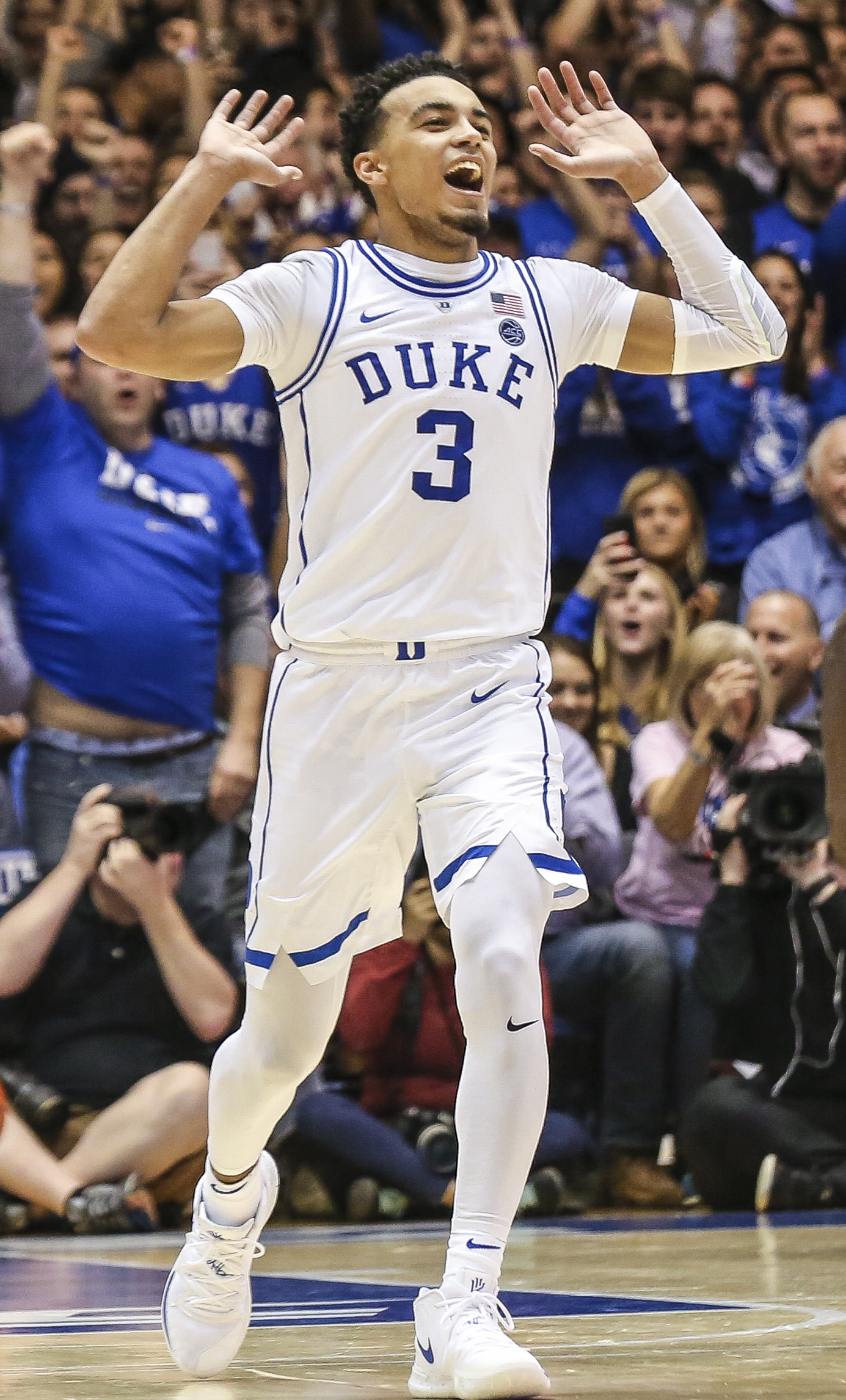
- Jones with Duke in 2019

No. 30 – Chicago Bulls
- Position: Point guard
- League: NBA

Personal information
- Born: January 8, 2000 (age 26) Apple Valley, Minnesota, U.S.
- Listed height: 6 ft 1 in (1.85 m)
- Listed weight: 190 lb (86 kg)

Career information
- High school: Apple Valley (Apple Valley, Minnesota)
- College: Duke (2018–2020)
- NBA draft: 2020: 2nd round, 41st overall pick
- Drafted by: San Antonio Spurs
- Playing career: 2020–present

Career history
- 2020–2025: San Antonio Spurs
- 2021: →Austin Spurs
- 2025–present: Chicago Bulls

Career highlights
- All-NBA G League Third Team (2021); Third-team All-American – AP, USBWA, NABC (2020); ACC Player of the Year (2020); ACC Defensive Player of the Year (2020); First-team All-ACC (2020); ACC All-Freshman team (2019); 2x ACC All-Defensive Team (2019, 2020); McDonald's All-American (2018); Minnesota Mr. Basketball (2018)
- Stats at NBA.com
- Stats at Basketball Reference
Medals
Men's basketball
Representing United States
FIBA Americas Under-16 Championship
Gold medal – first place	2015 Argentina	National team

Tre Isiah Jones (/ˈtreɪ/ TRAY; born January 8, 2000) is an American professional basketball player for the Chicago Bulls of the National Basketball Association (NBA). Like his older brother, fellow NBA player Tyus Jones, he played college basketball for the Duke Blue Devils.

== Early life ==
Jones played high school basketball for Apple Valley High School in Apple Valley, Minnesota. He joined the varsity team while in eighth grade and became a starter in his next season. Jones led Apple Valley to two Minnesota 4A state titles, in 2015 and 2017, and averaged 23.5 points, 10.4 rebounds and 7.5 assists in the 2016–17 season. Jones left as a two-time Minnesota Gatorade Player of the Year and earned McDonald's All-American and Minnesota Mr. Basketball honors after his senior season.

By the end of his high school career, Jones was considered a five-star recruit and one of the best point guards in the 2018 class.

On August 13, 2017, Jones committed to play college basketball for Duke.

College recruiting
Name	Hometown	School	Height	Weight	Commit date
Tre Jones; PG	Apple Valley, MN	Apple Valley (MN)	6 ft 2 in (1.88 m)	183 lb (83 kg)	Aug 13, 2017
Tre Jones; PG	Recruit ratings: Rivals: 247Sports: ESPN: (93)				
Overall recruit ranking: Rivals: 14 247Sports: 14 ESPN: 17
Note: In many cases, Scout, Rivals, 247Sports, On3, and ESPN may conflict in their listings of height and weight.; In these cases, the average was taken. ESPN grades are on a 100-point scale.; Sources: "Duke 2018 Basketball Commitments". Rivals.; "2018 Duke Blue Devils Recruiting Class". ESPN.; "2018 Team Ranking". Rivals.

== College career ==
=== Freshman season (2018–19) ===
Jones made his college debut for Duke on November 6, 2018, chipping in 6 points, 4 rebounds and 7 assists in a 118–84 win over Kentucky at the Champions Classic. On December 20, he led his team to a 69–58 victory over Texas Tech, collecting 13 points, 5 rebounds, 5 assists and 6 steals. Jones suffered a shoulder injury on January 14, 2019, during a collision with Frank Howard of Syracuse. He missed two games with the injury and returned on January 26 versus Georgia Tech. In his freshman season at Duke, Jones averaged 9.4 points, 5.3 assists and 3.8 rebounds per game in 36 games for the Blue Devils.

=== Sophomore season (2019–20) ===
On April 8, 2019, it was announced Jones would return to Duke for the 2019–20 season. He scored 15 points in his sophomore debut, a 68–66 win over Kansas. Jones had a career-high 31 points in a 74–63 win over Georgia State on November 15. Jones missed games against Wofford and Brown in late December with a mild foot injury. At the conclusion of the regular season, Jones was named ACC Player of the Year and Defensive Player of the Year. Jones averaged 16.2 points, 6.4 assists, 4.2 rebounds and 1.8 steals per game as a sophomore. After the season, Jones declared for the 2020 NBA draft.

== Professional career ==
=== San Antonio / Austin Spurs (2020–2025) ===
Jones was selected by the San Antonio Spurs with the 41st pick overall in the 2020 NBA draft which was hosted on November 18, 2020. On November 27, Jones signed with the Spurs. On February 1, 2021, Jones received his first assignment at G League.

On March 17, 2023, his brother Tyus got his first triple-double, against Tre, when San Antonio lost in overtime to the Memphis Grizzlies, but just 16 days later Tre matched his brother's triple-double count with 17 points, 11 assists and 10 rebounds of his own in an overtime win against the Sacramento Kings.

On July 8, 2023, Jones re-signed with the Spurs on a two-year, $19 million contract.

=== Chicago Bulls (2025–present) ===
On February 3, 2025, Jones, alongside Zach Collins, Kevin Huerter and a 2025 first-round pick, was traded to the Chicago Bulls in a three team deal, in which they sent Zach LaVine, Sidy Cissoko, three first-round picks and two second-round picks to the Sacramento Kings, who sent De'Aaron Fox and Jordan McLaughlin to San Antonio.

On June 30, 2025, Jones agreed to a three-year, $24 million contract to return to the Bulls.

== National team career ==
Jones played for the United States at the 2015 FIBA Americas Under-16 Championship in Argentina, winning the gold medal. He recorded 19 steals in the competition, breaking the American under-16 record set by Malik Newman in 2013.

== Career statistics ==
Legend
GP	Games played	GS	Games started	MPG	Minutes per game
FG%	Field goal percentage	3P%	3-point field goal percentage	FT%	Free throw percentage
RPG	Rebounds per game	APG	Assists per game	SPG	Steals per game
BPG	Blocks per game	PPG	Points per game	**Bold**	Career high

=== NBA ===
==== Regular season ====
Year	Team	GP	GS	MPG	FG%	3P%	FT%	RPG	APG	SPG	BPG	PPG
2020–21	San Antonio	37	1	7.3	.474	**.600**	**.895**	.6	1.1	.2	.0	2.5
2021–22	San Antonio	69	11	16.6	.490	.196	.780	2.2	3.4	.6	.1	6.0
2022–23	San Antonio	68	**65**	**29.2**	.459	.285	.860	3.6	**6.6**	**1.3**	.1	12.9
2023–24	San Antonio	**77**	48	27.8	.505	.335	.856	**3.8**	6.2	1.0	.1	10.0
2024–25	San Antonio	28	0	16.1	.484	.308	.758	2.1	3.7	0.6	.2	4.4
2024–25	Chicago	18	9	25.3	**.572**	.500	.882	3.2	4.9	1.1	**.3**	11.5
2025–26	Chicago	65	41	27.0	.553	.315	.841	3.1	5.4	1.2	.2	**14.1**
Career		362	175	22.6	.503	.312	.840	2.8	4.8	.9	.1	9.4

=== College ===
Year	Team	GP	GS	MPG	FG%	3P%	FT%	RPG	APG	SPG	BPG	PPG
2018–19	Duke	**36**	**36**	34.2	.414	.262	.758	3.8	5.3	**1.9**	.2	11.6
2019–20	Duke	29	29	**35.4**	**.423**	**.361**	**.771**	**4.2**	**6.4**	1.8	**.3**	**16.2**
Career		65	65	34.7	.419	.313	.767	4.0	5.8	1.85	.2	13.9

== Personal life ==
Jones has three older brothers: Tyus was a former NCAA champion with Duke and now plays for the Denver Nuggets of the NBA, while Jadee played college basketball for Furman before becoming a basketball coach at Apple Valley High School and Minnehaha Academy; additionally, Tre has a half-brother, Reggie Bunch, that played at Robert Morris University. His grandfather, Dennis Deutsch, was a member of the United States Armed Forces.

Jones married Maddy Torres in 2023. They have three daughters.

== See also ==
- List of All-Atlantic Coast Conference men's basketball teams
