= 2019–20 Virginia Cavaliers men's basketball team =

American college basketball season

2019–20 Virginia Cavaliers men's basketball

Hall of Fame Tip Off champions
- Conference: Atlantic Coast Conference

Ranking
- Coaches: No. 17
- AP: No. 16
- Record: 23–7 (15–5 ACC)
- Head coach: Tony Bennett (11th season)
- Associate head coach: Jason Williford (11th season)
- Assistant coaches: Brad Soderberg (5th season); Orlando Vandross (2nd season)
- Offensive scheme: Blocker-Mover
- Base defense: Pack-Line
- Captains: Mamadi Diakite; Braxton Key
- Home arena: John Paul Jones Arena

2019–20 ACC men's basketball standings
	Conf.				Overall
Team	W		L	PCT	W		L	PCT
No. 4 Florida State	16	–	4	.800	26	–	5	.839
No. 16 Virginia	15	–	5	.750	23	–	7	.767
No. 14 Louisville	15	–	5	.750	24	–	7	.774
No. 11 Duke	15	–	5	.750	25	–	6	.806
Georgia Tech*	11	–	9	.550	17	–	14	.548
NC State	10	–	10	.500	20	–	12	.625
Syracuse	10	–	10	.500	18	–	14	.563
Notre Dame	10	–	10	.500	20	–	12	.625
Clemson	9	–	11	.450	16	–	15	.516
Miami (FL)	7	–	13	.350	15	–	16	.484
Boston College	7	–	13	.350	13	–	18	.419
Virginia Tech	7	–	13	.350	16	–	16	.500
Wake Forest	6	–	14	.300	13	–	18	.419
Pittsburgh	6	–	14	.300	16	–	17	.485
North Carolina	6	–	14	.300	14	–	19	.424
*Ineligible for postseason due to NCAA violations. Note: The 2020 ACC tournament was cancelled before the quarterfinals due to the COVID-19 pandemic. Rankings from AP poll

The 2019–20 Virginia Cavaliers men's basketball team represented the University of Virginia during the 2019–20 NCAA Division I men's basketball season. The team was led by head coach Tony Bennett in his 11th year, and played their home games at John Paul Jones Arena in Charlottesville, Virginia as members of the Atlantic Coast Conference.

The Cavaliers finished the season 23–7, and 15–5 in ACC play to finish a three-way tie for second place. The team was scheduled to play Notre Dame in the quarterfinals of the ACC tournament before the tournament was canceled due to the COVID-19 pandemic. The NCAA tournament was also canceled due to the pandemic.

== Previous season ==
The Cavaliers finished the 2018–19 season 35–3, 16–2 in ACC play to earn a share of the ACC regular season championship. They defeated NC State in the quarterfinals of the ACC tournament before losing to Florida State in the semifinals. They received an at-large bid to the NCAA tournament as the No. 1 seed in the South region. There, they defeated Gardner–Webb and Oklahoma to advance to the Sweet Sixteen. They then defeated Oregon and Purdue to advance to the Final Four. In the Final Four, they defeated Auburn to earn a trip to the National Championship game, where they defeated Texas Tech to earn the school's first ever NCAA Championship.

== Offseason ==
=== Departures ===
Virginia departures
Name	Number	Pos.	Height	Weight	Year	Hometown	Reason for departure
Francesco Badocchi	1	F	6'7"	185	(redshirt) Freshman	Milan, Italy	Left the team for personal reasons
Kyle Guy	5	G	6'2"	175	Junior	Indianapolis, IN	Declared for 2019 NBA draft; selected 55th overall by the New York Knicks
Ty Jerome	11	G	6'5"	200	Junior	New Rochelle, NY	Declared for 2019 NBA draft; selected 24th overall by the Philadelphia 76ers
De'Andre Hunter	12	F	6'7"	222	(redshirt) Sophomore	Philadelphia, PA	Declared for 2019 NBA draft; selected 4th overall by the Los Angeles Lakers
Grant Kersey	13	G	6'1"	160	Junior	Charlottesville, VA	Walk-on; did not return
Marco Anthony	24	G	6'4"	228	Sophomore	San Antonio, TX	Transferred to Utah State
Jack Salt	33	C	6'10"	250	(redshirt) Senior	Auckland, New Zealand	Graduated

=== Incoming transfers ===
Virginia incoming transfers
Name	Number	Pos.	Height	Weight	Year	Hometown	Previous school	Years remaining	Date eligible
Sam Hauser	10	F	6'8"	225	Senior	Stevens Point, WI	Marquette	1	October 1, 2020
Tomas Woldetensae	53	G	6'5"	195	Junior	Bologna, Italy	Indian Hills CC	2	October 1, 2019

=== 2019 recruiting class ===
College recruiting
Name	Hometown	School	Height	Weight	Commit date
Casey Morsell #11 SG	Washington, D.C.	Saint John's College High School	6 ft 2 in (1.88 m)	195 lb (88 kg)	Apr 6, 2018
Casey Morsell #11 SG	Recruit ratings: Scout: Rivals: 247Sports: ESPN: (88)				
Kadin Shedrick #18 C	Holly Springs, NC	Holly Springs High School	6 ft 10 in (2.08 m)	200 lb (91 kg)	Aug 20, 2018
Kadin Shedrick #18 C	Recruit ratings: Scout: Rivals: 247Sports: ESPN: (85)				
Justin McKoy; SF	Cary, NC	Panther Creek High School	6 ft 8 in (2.03 m)	225 lb (102 kg)	Apr 15, 2019
Justin McKoy; SF	Recruit ratings: Scout: Rivals: 247Sports: ESPN: (NR)				
Overall recruit ranking:
Note: In many cases, Scout, Rivals, 247Sports, On3, and ESPN may conflict in their listings of height and weight.; In these cases, the average was taken. ESPN grades are on a 100-point scale.; Sources: "Virginia 2019 Basketball Commitments". Rivals.; "2019 Virginia Commits". Scout.; "2019 Player Commits". ESPN.; "Scout.com Team Recruiting Rankings". Scout.; "2019 Team Ranking". Rivals.; "Virginia 2019 Basketball Commitments". 247Sports.

== Roster ==
2019–20 Virginia Cavaliers men's basketball team
Players
Coaches

Pos.	#	Name	Height	Weight	Year	Previous school	Hometown
G	0	Kihei Clark	5 ft 9 in (1.75 m)	163 lb (74 kg)	So	Taft Charter HS	Woodland Hills, California
F	2	Braxton Key	6 ft 8 in (2.03 m)	230 lb (104 kg)	Sr	Oak Hill Academy; Alabama	Decatur, Georgia
F	4	Justin McKoy	6 ft 8 in (2.03 m)	221 lb (100 kg)	Fr	Panther Creek HS	Cary, North Carolina
G	5	Jayden Nixon (W)	6 ft 3 in (1.91 m)	192 lb (87 kg)	So	Choate Rosemary Hall	Charlottesville, Virginia
F	10	Sam Hauser (redshirt)	6 ft 8 in (2.03 m)	225 lb (102 kg)	Sr	Stevens Point HS; Marquette	Stevens Point, Wisconsin
G	12	Chase Coleman (W)	5 ft 9 in (1.75 m)	154 lb (70 kg)	Fr	Maury HS	Norfolk, Virginia
G	13	Casey Morsell	6 ft 3 in (1.91 m)	195 lb (88 kg)	Fr	St. John's College HS	Fort Washington, Maryland
F	21	Kadin Shedrick (redshirt)	6 ft 11 in (2.11 m)	214 lb (97 kg)	Fr	Holly Springs HS	Raleigh, North Carolina
C	22	Francisco Cáffaro	7 ft 0 in (2.13 m)	244 lb (111 kg)	RS Fr	NBA Global Academy	El Trébol Santa Fe, Argentina
G	23	Kody Stattmann	6 ft 7 in (2.01 m)	200 lb (91 kg)	So	St. Augustine's College	Bentley Park, Australia
F	24	Austin Katstra (W)	6 ft 6 in (1.98 m)	227 lb (103 kg)	Jr	Albemarle HS	Charlottesville, Virginia
F	25	Mamadi Diakite	6 ft 9 in (2.06 m)	224 lb (102 kg)	RS Sr	Blue Ridge School	Conakry, Guinea
F	30	Jay Huff	7 ft 1 in (2.16 m)	243 lb (110 kg)	RS Jr	Voyager Academy	Durham, North Carolina
G	53	Tomas Woldetensae	6 ft 5 in (1.96 m)	196 lb (89 kg)	Jr	Victory Rock Prep (FL); Indian Hills CC	Bologna, Italy

Head coach

- Tony Bennett (Green Bay)

Assistant coach(es)

- Jason Williford (Virginia)
- Brad Soderberg (UW–Stevens Point)
- Orlando Vandross (American International)

Strength and conditioning coach(es)

- Mike Curtis (Virginia)

Athletic trainer(s)

- Ethan Saliba (Kansas)

Legend

- (C) Team captain
- (S) Suspended
- (I) Ineligible
- (W) Walk-on
- Injured
- Current redshirt

Roster

Virginia coaching staff
Name	Position	Year in position	Year on coaching staff	Alma mater
Tony Bennett	Head coach	11	11	UW-Green Bay
Jason Williford	Associate head coach	2	11	Virginia
Brad Soderberg	Assistant coach	5	5	UW-Stevens Point
Orlando Vandross	Assistant coach	2	5	American International
Kyle Getter	Director of recruiting/player development	2	2	Hanover
Larry Mangino	Director of scouting/recruiting	4	4	Montclair State
Johnny Carpenter	Director of player personnel	2	5	Virginia
Mike Curtis	Strength and conditioning coach	11	11	Virginia
Ethan Saliba	Head athletic trainer	22	37	Kansas
Ronnie Wideman	Associate AD for basketball administration/operations	10	11	Washington State

=== Depth chart ===
Pos.	Starting 5	Bench 1	Bench 2
C	Jay Huff	Francisco Caffaro
PF	Mamadi Diakite	Justin McKoy
SF	Braxton Key	Kody Stattmann	Austin Katstra
SG	Tomas Woldetensae	Casey Morsell	Jayden Nixon
PG	Kihei Clark		Chase Coleman

== Schedule and results ==
Date time, TV	Rank^{#}	Opponent^{#}	Result	Record	High points	High rebounds	High assists	Site (attendance) city, state
Regular season
November 6, 2019; 9:00 pm, ACCN	No. 11	at Syracuse	W 48–34	1–0 (1–0)	12 – Diakite	12 – Huff	7 – Clark	Carrier Dome (22,518); Syracuse, NY
November 10, 2019*; 6:00 pm, ESPNU	No. 11	James Madison	W 65–34	2–0	19 – Diakite	13 – Diakite	6 – Clark	John Paul Jones Arena (13,524); Charlottesville, VA
November 16, 2019*; 12:00 pm, ACCN	No. 9	Columbia; Hall of Fame Tip Off campus game	W 60–42	3–0	13 – Tied	9 – Key	5 – Clark	John Paul Jones Arena (13,736); Charlottesville, VA
November 19, 2019*; 7:00 pm, ACCRSN	No. 7	Vermont; Hall of Fame Tip Off campus game	W 61–55	4–0	19 – Diakite	7 – Huff	4 – Tied	John Paul Jones Arena (13,913); Charlottesville, VA
November 23, 2019*; 12:00 pm, ESPNews	No. 7	vs. Massachusetts; Hall of Fame Tip Off semifinals	W 58–46	5–0	16 – Key	8 – Tied	6 – Clark	Mohegan Sun Arena; Uncasville, CT
November 24, 2019*; 1:00 pm, ESPN	No. 7	vs. Arizona State; Hall of Fame Tip Off championship game	W 48–45	6–0	19 – Morsell	8 – Key	2 – Tied	Mohegan Sun Arena; Uncasville, CT
November 27, 2019*; 4:00 pm, ACCN	No. 7	Maine	W 46–26	7–0	15 – Diakite	7 – Diakite	5 – Clark	John Paul Jones Arena (14,109); Charlottesville, VA
December 4, 2019*; 7:15 pm, ESPN2	No. 5	at Purdue; ACC–Big Ten Challenge	L 40–69	7–1	11 – Huff	5 – Tied	4 – Clark	Mackey Arena (14,804); West Lafayette, IN
December 8, 2019; 4:00 pm, ACCN	No. 5	No. 7 North Carolina	W 56–47	8–1 (2–0)	12 – Diakite	7 – Tied	6 – Clark	John Paul Jones Arena (14,629); Charlottesville, VA
December 18, 2019*; 6:30 pm, ACCN	No. 9	Stony Brook	W 56–44	9–1	14 – Clark	7 – Huff	6 – Clark	John Paul Jones Arena (13,665); Charlottesville, VA
December 22, 2019*; 3:00 pm, ABC	No. 9	South Carolina	L 59–70	9–2	21 – Diakite	5 – Tied	7 – Clark	John Paul Jones Arena (14,409); Charlottesville, VA
December 29, 2019*; 4:00 pm, ESPN2	No. 16	Navy	W 65–56	10–2	15 – Key	8 – Diakite	13 – Clark	John Paul Jones Arena (14,399); Charlottesville, VA
January 4, 2020; 2:00 pm, ACCRSN	No. 19	Virginia Tech; Commonwealth Clash	W 65–39	11–2 (3–0)	18 – Tied	10 – Tied	6 – Clark	John Paul Jones Arena (14,629); Charlottesville, VA
January 7, 2020; 7:00 pm, ACCN	No. 18	at Boston College	L 53–60	11–3 (3–1)	16 – Key	8 – Key	3 – Clark	Conte Forum (5,781); Chestnut Hill, MA
January 11, 2020; 4:00 pm, ESPN	No. 18	Syracuse	L 55–63 ^{OT}	11–4 (3–2)	16 – Huff	11 – Key	9 – Clark	John Paul Jones Arena (14,133); Charlottesville, VA
January 15, 2020; 7:00 pm, ESPN2		at No. 9 Florida State	L 50–54	11–5 (3–3)	16 – Diakite	7 – Huff	5 – Clark	Donald L. Tucker Civic Center (10,725); Tallahassee, FL
January 18, 2020; 8:00 pm, ACCN		at Georgia Tech	W 63–58	12–5 (4–3)	17 – Tied	8 – Huff	7 – Clark	McCamish Pavilion (7,314); Atlanta, GA
January 20, 2020; 7:00 pm, ESPN		NC State	L 51–53	12–6 (4–4)	10 – Clark	8 – Key	5 – Clark	John Paul Jones Arena (14,163); Charlottesville, VA
January 26, 2020; 12:00 pm, ACCN		at Wake Forest	W 65–63 ^{OT}	13–6 (5–4)	21 – Woldetensae	8 – Tied	7 – Clark	LJVM Coliseum (7,752); Winston-Salem, NC
January 28, 2020; 7:00 pm, ESPN		No. 5 Florida State	W 61–56	14–6 (6–4)	19 – Diakite	9 – Tied	4 – Clark	John Paul Jones Arena (13,869); Charlottesville, VA
February 5, 2020; 7:00 pm, ACCRSN		Clemson	W 51–44	15–6 (7–4)	19 – Key	10 – Huff	10 – Clark	John Paul Jones Arena (13,580); Charlottesville, VA
February 8, 2020; 4:00 pm, ESPN		at No. 5 Louisville	L 73–80	15–7 (7–5)	27 – Woldetensae	5 – Clark	7 – Clark	KFC Yum! Center (19,250); Louisville, KY
February 11, 2020; 9:00 pm, ESPN2		Notre Dame	W 50–49 ^{OT}	16–7 (8–5)	20 – Diakite	12 – Key	3 – Tied	John Paul Jones Arena (13,696); Charlottesville, VA
February 15, 2020; 8:00 pm, ESPN		at North Carolina	W 64–62	17–7 (9–5)	18 – Woldetensae	4 – 3 tied	9 – Clark	Dean Smith Center (21,308); Chapel Hill, NC
February 19, 2020; 8:00 pm, ACCN		Boston College	W 78–65	18–7 (10–5)	17 – Tied	8 – Huff	8 – Clark	John Paul Jones Arena (13,819); Charlottesville, VA
February 22, 2020; 12:00 pm, ESPN2		at Pittsburgh	W 59–56	19–7 (11–5)	17 – Clark	10 – Diakite	4 – Key	Petersen Events Center (10,133); Pittsburgh, PA
February 26, 2020; 7:00 pm, ESPN2		at Virginia Tech; Commonwealth Clash	W 56–53	20–7 (12–5)	19 – Diakite	11 – Key	6 – Clark	Cassell Coliseum (9,275); Blacksburg, VA
February 29, 2020; 6:00 pm, ESPN		No. 7 Duke	W 52–50	21–7 (13–5)	15 – Huff	9 – Huff	5 – Clark	John Paul Jones Arena (14,629); Charlottesville, VA
March 4, 2020; 9:00 pm, ACCN	No. 22	at Miami (FL)	W 46–44	22–7 (14–5)	17 – Huff	10 – Diakite	4 – Clark	Watsco Center (5,318); Coral Gables, FL
March 7, 2020; 4:00 pm, ESPN	No. 22	No. 10 Louisville; Senior Day	W 57–54	23–7 (15–5)	18 – Clark	8 – Diakite	5 – Clark	John Paul Jones Arena (14,629); Charlottesville, VA
ACC tournament
March 12, 2020; 7:00 pm, ESPN	(2) No. 17	vs. (7) Notre Dame; Quarterfinals	ACC Tournament Cancelled					Greensboro Coliseum; Greensboro, NC
*Non-conference game. ^{#}Rankings from AP Poll. (#) Tournament seedings in parentheses. All times are in Eastern Time.

== Rankings ==
Ranking movements Legend: ██ Increase in ranking ██ Decrease in ranking — = Not ranked RV = Received votes т = Tied with team above or below ( ) = First-place votes
	Week																			
Poll	Pre	1	2	3	4	5	6	7	8	9	10	11	12	13	14	15	16	17	18	Final
AP	11	9	7 (1)	7 (1)	5 (5)	9	9	16	19	18	RV	RV	—	RV	RV	RV	RV	22	17	16
Coaches	9	9	6	6	2 (2)	8	7	13	19	18	RV	RV	—	RV	—	RV	RV	22т	18	17

*AP does not release post-NCAA Tournament rankings.
