= 2019 NCAA Division I men's basketball championship game =

Men's college basketball championship game

2019 NCAA Division I men’s basketball Championship Game
National championship game
Texas Tech Red Raiders	Virginia Cavaliers
Big 12	ACC
(31–6)	(34–3)
77	85
Head coach: Chris Beard	Head coach: Tony Bennett
- AP: 9
- Coaches: 10
- AP: 2
- Coaches: 2
	1st half	2nd half	OT	Total
Texas Tech Red Raiders	29	39	9	77
Virginia Cavaliers	32	36	17	85
- Date: April 8, 2019
- Venue: U.S. Bank Stadium, Minneapolis, Minnesota
- MVP: Kyle Guy, Virginia
- Favorite: Virginia by 1.5
- Referees: Michael Stephens, Terry Wymer, Ron Groover
- Attendance: 72,062
- National anthem: Johnny Holliday

United States TV coverage
- Network: CBS
- Announcers: Jim Nantz, Bill Raftery, Grant Hill and Tracy Wolfson
- Nielsen Ratings: 12.4 (19.63 million viewers)

The 2019 NCAA Division I men's basketball championship game was the final game of the single-elimination tournament to determine the men's National Collegiate Athletic Association (NCAA) Division I college basketball national champion for the 2018–19 season. The game was played on April 8, 2019, at U.S. Bank Stadium in Minneapolis, Minnesota, between the Texas Tech Red Raiders and the Virginia Cavaliers. It was the first time since 1979 that both teams in the national championship game were making their first such appearance. The Cavaliers defeated the Red Raiders, 85–77 in overtime, to win their first national title. Kyle Guy was named the NCAA basketball tournament Most Outstanding Player.

== Participants ==
=== Texas Tech Red Raiders ===
Texas Tech, led by third-year head coach Chris Beard, finished the regular season with a record of 26–5. They posted a 14–4 conference record, earning them the No. 2 seed in the Big 12 tournament, where they lost to No. 10 seed West Virginia in their first game. In the NCAA Tournament, the Red Raiders received a No. 3 seed in the West Regional. They defeated No. 14 seed Northern Kentucky and No. 6 seed Buffalo to reach the Sweet Sixteen, where they upset No. 2 seed Michigan by nineteen points. Two days later, they defeated No. 1 seed Gonzaga to win the West Regional. In their first Final Four, the Red Raiders overcame a challenge from the East Regional champions, No. 2 seed Michigan State, whom they defeated 61–51 to reach their first ever NCAA title game.

Jarrett Culver, a sophomore, was named the Big 12 Conference Men's Basketball Player of the Year.

=== Virginia Cavaliers ===
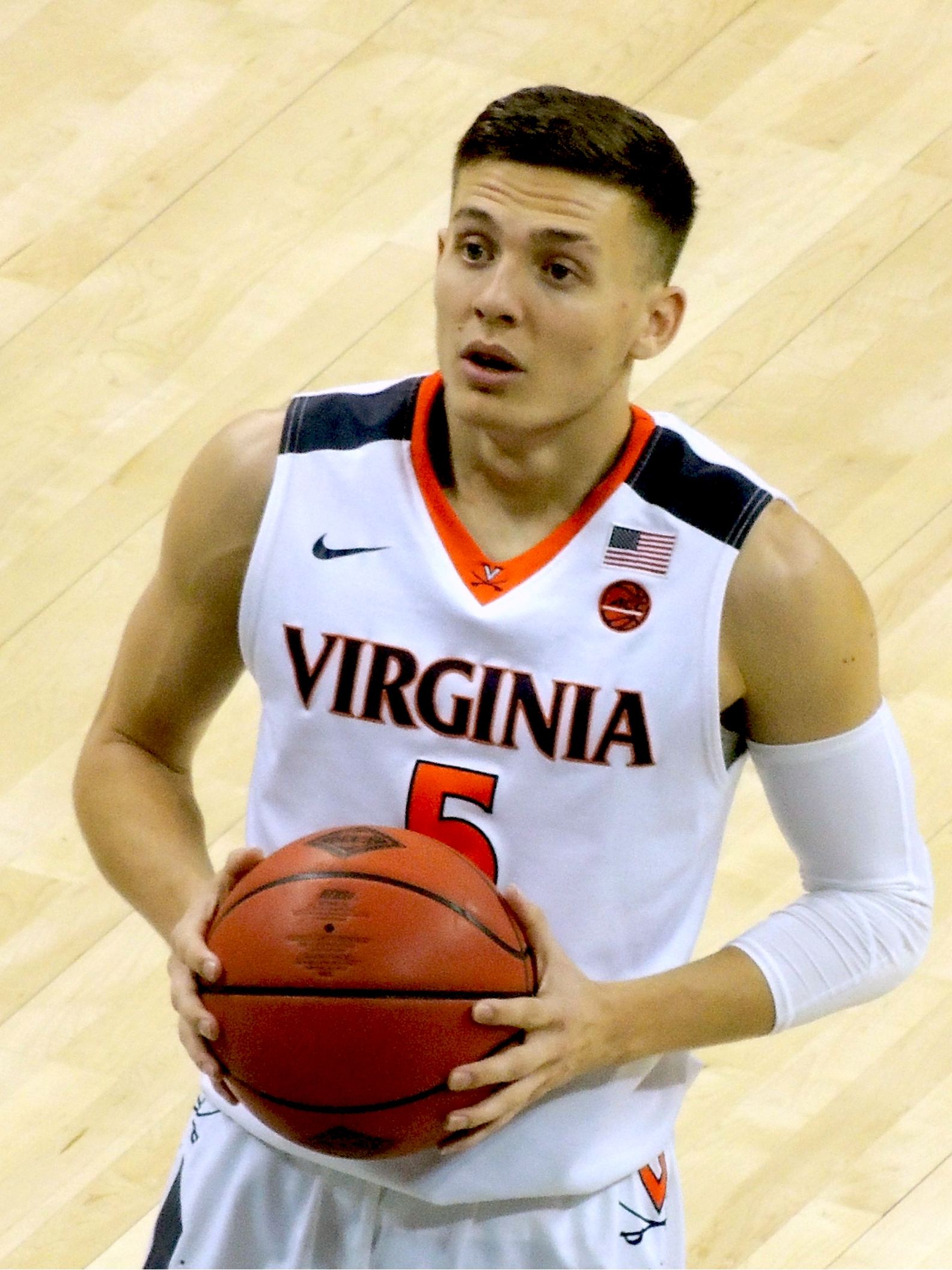
Kyle Guy

The Cavaliers were coming off a year they had gone from an unranked team all the way to AP No. 1, only to become the first No. 1 seed to lose in the first round of the NCAA Tournament. Led by tenth-year head coach Tony Bennett, Virginia finished the regular season with a record of 28–2. They posted a 16–2 conference record, earning them the No. 1 seed in the ACC tournament, where they defeated No. 8 seed NC State, before losing to No. 4 seed Florida State. In the NCAA Tournament, the Cavaliers earned a No. 1 seed in the South Regional. The Cavaliers defeated No. 16 seed and NCAA tournament debutantes Gardner–Webb in the first round, and No. 9 seed Oklahoma in the second round to advance to the Sweet Sixteen, where they ended a potential Cinderella run from No. 12 seed Oregon. In the Elite Eight, the Cavs beat No. 3 Purdue in overtime; with the win, they advanced to their first Final Four since 1984. They then defeated No. 5 seed Auburn, champions of the Midwest Regional, by a single point.

De'Andre Hunter, a redshirt sophomore, was named NABC Defensive Player of the Year.

== Starting lineups ==
Texas Tech	Position		Virginia
Tariq Owens	F		Mamadi Diakite
Matt Mooney	G		Kyle Guy
Davide Moretti	G		Ty Jerome
Jarrett Culver	G	F	De'Andre Hunter
Norense Odiase	C	G	Kihei Clark

== Game summary ==
CBS

April 8, 2019
8:20 pm CDT

Report

#W3 Texas Tech Red Raiders 77, #S1 Virginia Cavaliers 85 (OT)
Scoring by half: 29–32, 39–36 Overtime: 9–17
Pts: Brandone Francis - 17; Rebs: Jarrett Culver - 9 Asts: Jarrett Culver - 6	Pts: De'Andre Hunter - 27; Rebs: Braxton Key - 10; Asts: Ty Jerome - 8

U.S. Bank Stadium, Minneapolis, Minnesota
Attendance: 72,062
Referees: Michael Stephens, Terry Wymer, Ron Groover

Texas Tech did not score its first field goal until 7:22 into the game. The Red Raiders took the lead, 25–24, with 3:57 left in the first half. Virginia's Ty Jerome hit a three-point field goal with less than two seconds left in the first half, to give Virginia a 32–29 lead over Texas Tech at halftime. Virginia kept the lead for much of the second half, but Texas Tech stayed in the game and took the lead, until De'Andre Hunter of Virginia hit a game-tying three point shot with 12.9 seconds left in regulation. Texas Tech's Jarrett Culver attempted a three-point shot to win the game, but the shot was blocked by Virginia's Braxton Key, and time expired. Texas Tech outscored Virginia 39–36 in the second half, resulting in a 68–68 tie at the end of regulation.

The game went into a five-minute overtime. Matt Mooney of Texas Tech opened overtime with two baskets, including a three-pointer, but Virginia then went on an 11–0 scoring run. Virginia ran out the clock to secure the win with a final score of 85–77.

After the game, Virginia's Kyle Guy was chosen as the NCAA basketball tournament Most Outstanding Player. Hunter finished the game with a career-high 27 points. Culver, meanwhile, struggled during the game while primarily defended by Hunter (NABC Defensive Player of the Year) and scored 15 points while shooting 5-for-22 (.227), including 0-for-6 on three point shots.

== See also ==
- 2019 NCAA Division I women's basketball championship game
