= 2018–19 Virginia Cavaliers men's basketball team =

American college basketball season

2018–19 Virginia Cavaliers men's basketball

NCAA tournament National Champions ACC regular season co-champions Battle 4 Atlantis champions

National Championship Game, W 85–77 ^{OT} vs. Texas Tech
- Conference: Atlantic Coast Conference

Ranking
- Coaches: No. 1
- AP: No. 2
- Record: 35–3 (16–2 ACC)
- Head coach: Tony Bennett (10th season)
- Associate head coach: Jason Williford (10th season)
- Assistant coaches: Brad Soderberg (4th season); Orlando Vandross (1st season)
- Offensive scheme: Blocker-Mover
- Base defense: Pack-Line
- Captains: Jack Salt; Kyle Guy; Ty Jerome
- Home arena: John Paul Jones Arena

2018–19 ACC men's basketball standings
	Conf.				Overall
Team	W		L	PCT	W		L	PCT
No. 2 Virginia	16	–	2	.889	35	–	3	.921
No. 3 North Carolina	16	–	2	.889	29	–	7	.806
No. 1 Duke †	14	–	4	.778	32	–	6	.842
No. 10 Florida State	13	–	5	.722	29	–	8	.784
No. 16 Virginia Tech	12	–	6	.667	26	–	9	.743
Syracuse	10	–	8	.556	20	–	14	.588
Louisville	10	–	8	.556	20	–	14	.588
NC State	9	–	9	.500	24	–	12	.667
Clemson	9	–	9	.500	20	–	14	.588
Georgia Tech	6	–	12	.333	14	–	18	.438
Boston College	5	–	13	.278	14	–	17	.452
Miami (FL)	5	–	13	.278	14	–	18	.438
Wake Forest	4	–	14	.222	11	–	20	.355
Pittsburgh	3	–	15	.167	14	–	19	.424
Notre Dame	3	–	15	.167	14	–	19	.424
† 2019 ACC tournament winner Rankings from AP poll

The 2018–19 Virginia Cavaliers men's basketball team represented the University of Virginia during the 2018–19 NCAA Division I men's basketball season. The team was led by head coach Tony Bennett in his tenth year, and played their home games at John Paul Jones Arena in Charlottesville, Virginia as members of the Atlantic Coast Conference.

UVA opened the season with consecutive wins over ranked Big Ten teams, No. 25 Wisconsin (Battle 4 Atlantis) and No. 24 Maryland (ACC–Big Ten Challenge), the latter of which improved Bennett's record in the Challenge to 8–2. An unheralded two-star recruit, 5'9" Kihei Clark from Los Angeles, California, started both games as a true freshman. The team then started the season 16–0 before falling to No. 1 Duke, 72–70. The game was just the fourth in college basketball history between two teams both ranked No. 1, as the No. 4 Cavaliers were voted atop the Coaches Poll before the loss. After a 16–2 ACC record, Virginia won a share of their fourth ACC regular season title in the past six years.

In the ACC tournament, the Cavaliers defeated NC State 76–56, before falling to Florida State in the conference semifinals. Virginia was then awarded the No. 1 seed in the South region and dispatched Gardner-Webb and Oklahoma by healthy margins in the first two rounds in Columbia, South Carolina. They advanced to a Sweet 16 matchup with Oregon and beat Oregon 53–49 to advance to their 2nd Elite 8 under Bennett. In the Elite Eight, they beat Purdue 80–75 in overtime to secure a trip to their first Final Four since 1984. On April 6, 2019, they defeated Auburn in their Final Four matchup by a score of 63–62 on 3 last-second free throws by Kyle Guy, cementing the program's first ever trip to the national championship game. On April 8, 2019, Virginia beat Texas Tech 85–77 in overtime, winning its first national championship.

== Previous season ==
Unranked by the AP in the preseason poll, the Cavaliers surprisingly finished the 2017–18 season 31–3, and 17–1 in ACC play to win both ACC regular season and tournament titles. The Cavaliers received an automatic bid to the NCAA tournament as the No. 1 seed in the South region, where they were upset by No. 16 UMBC in the first round. This was the first time in Men's NCAA tournament history that a No. 1 seed was upset by a No. 16 seed.

== Offseason ==
Virginia's offseason started on the night of March 16, 2018, and ended on the evening of November 6, 2018.

The Cavaliers lost five players and gained four.

=== Departures ===
Virginia departures
Name	Number	Pos.	Height	Weight	Year	Hometown	Reason for departure
Devon Hall	0	G	6'5"	211	(redshirt) Senior	Virginia Beach, VA	Graduated/2018 NBA draft
Justice Bartley	2	G	6'5"	212	Junior	Lilburn, GA	Transferred to Maryland Eastern Shore
Trevon Gross Jr.	10	G	6'3"	200	Junior	Jackson, NJ	Transferred to Monmouth
Isaiah Wilkins	21	F	6'7"	227	Senior	Atlanta, GA	Graduated
Nigel Johnson	23	G	6'1"	182	(redshirt) Senior	Ashburn, VA	Graduated

=== Incoming transfers ===
Virginia incoming transfers
Name	Number	Pos.	Height	Weight	Year	Hometown	Previous school	Years remaining	Date eligible
Braxton Key	2	F	6'8"	225	Junior	Decatur, GA	Alabama	2	October 1, 2018

=== 2018 recruiting class ===
College recruiting
Name	Hometown	School	Height	Weight	Commit date
Kody Stattmann; SG	Cairns, Queensland, Australia	St. Augustine's College	6 ft 6 in (1.98 m)	N/A	Aug 28, 2017
Kody Stattmann; SG	Recruit ratings: Scout: Rivals: 247Sports: ESPN: (NR)				
Kihei Clark; PG	Woodland Hills, CA	Taft High School	5 ft 9 in (1.75 m)	N/A	Oct 2, 2017
Kihei Clark; PG	Recruit ratings: Scout: Rivals: 247Sports: ESPN: (75)				
Francisco Cáffaro; C	El Trébol, Argentina	NBA Global Academy	7 ft 0 in (2.13 m)	N/A	May 1, 2018
Francisco Cáffaro; C	Recruit ratings: Scout: Rivals: 247Sports: ESPN: (NR)				
Overall recruit ranking: 247Sports: 65
Note: In many cases, Scout, Rivals, 247Sports, On3, and ESPN may conflict in their listings of height and weight.; In these cases, the average was taken. ESPN grades are on a 100-point scale.; Sources: "Virginia 2018 Basketball Commitments". Rivals.; "2018 Virginia Commits". Scout.; "2018 Player Commits". ESPN.; "Scout.com Team Recruiting Rankings". Scout.; "2018 Team Ranking". Rivals.; "Virginia 2018 Basketball Commitments". 247Sports.

== Roster ==
=== Players ===
2018–19 Virginia Cavaliers men's basketball team
Players
Coaches

Pos.	#	Name	Height	Weight	Year	Previous school	Hometown
G	0	Kihei Clark	5 ft 9 in (1.75 m)	155 lb (70 kg)	Fr	Taft Charter HS	Woodland Hills, California
F	1	Francesco Badocchi	6 ft 7 in (2.01 m)	185 lb (84 kg)	RS Fr	Bishop Miege HS	Milan, Italy
F	2	Braxton Key	6 ft 8 in (2.03 m)	225 lb (102 kg)	Jr	Oak Hill Academy; Alabama	Decatur, Georgia
G	5	Kyle Guy (C)	6 ft 2 in (1.88 m)	175 lb (79 kg)	Jr	Lawrence Central HS	Indianapolis, Indiana
G	10	Jayden Nixon (W)	6 ft 3 in (1.91 m)	185 lb (84 kg)	Fr	Choate Rosemary Hall	Charlottesville, Virginia
G	11	Ty Jerome (C)	6 ft 5 in (1.96 m)	200 lb (91 kg)	Jr	Iona Prep	New Rochelle, New York
F	12	De'Andre Hunter	6 ft 7 in (2.01 m)	222 lb (101 kg)	RS So	Friends' Central School	Philadelphia, Pennsylvania
G	13	Grant Kersey (W)	6 ft 1 in (1.85 m)	160 lb (73 kg)	Jr	Albemarle HS	Charlottesville, Virginia
C	22	Francisco Cáffaro (redshirt)	7 ft 0 in (2.13 m)	233 lb (106 kg)	Fr	NBA Global Academy	El Trébol Santa Fe, Argentina
G	23	Kody Stattmann	6 ft 7 in (2.01 m)	178 lb (81 kg)	Fr	St. Augustine's College	Bentley Park, Australia
G	24	Marco Anthony	6 ft 4 in (1.93 m)	228 lb (103 kg)	So	Holmes HS	San Antonio, Texas
F	25	Mamadi Diakite	6 ft 9 in (2.06 m)	228 lb (103 kg)	RS Jr	Blue Ridge School	Conakry, Guinea
F	30	Jay Huff	7 ft 1 in (2.16 m)	230 lb (104 kg)	RS So	Voyager Academy	Durham, North Carolina
C	33	Jack Salt (C)	6 ft 10 in (2.08 m)	250 lb (113 kg)	RS Sr	Westlake Boys HS	Auckland, New Zealand
F	45	Austin Katstra (W)	6 ft 6 in (1.98 m)	214 lb (97 kg)	So	Albemarle HS	Charlottesville, Virginia

Head coach

- Tony Bennett (Green Bay)

Assistant coach(es)

- Jason Williford (Virginia)
- Brad Soderberg (UW–Stevens Point)
- Orlando Vandross (American International)

Legend

- (C) Team captain
- (S) Suspended
- (I) Ineligible
- (W) Walk-on
- Injured
- Current redshirt

Roster

=== Coaching staff ===
Virginia coaching staff
Name	Position	Year in position	Year on coaching staff	Alma mater
Tony Bennett	Head coach	10	10	UW-Green Bay
Jason Williford	Associate head coach	1	10	Virginia
Brad Soderberg	Assistant coach	4	4	UW-Stevens Point
Orlando Vandross	Assistant coach	1	4	American International
Kyle Getter	Director of recruiting/player development	1	1	Hanover College
Larry Mangino	Director of scouting/recruiting	3	3	Montclair State
Johnny Carpenter	Director of player personnel	1	4	Virginia
Mike Curtis	Strength and conditioning coach	10	10	Virginia
Ethan Saliba	Head athletic trainer	21	36	Kansas
Ronnie Wideman	Associate AD for basketball administration/operations	9	10	Washington State

=== Depth chart ===
Pos.	Starting 5	Bench
C	Jack Salt	Jay Huff
PF	Mamadi Diakite
SF	De'Andre Hunter	Braxton Key
SG	Kyle Guy
PG	Ty Jerome	Kihei Clark

== Schedule and results ==
Date time, TV	Rank^{#}	Opponent^{#}	Result	Record	High points	High rebounds	High assists	Site (attendance) city, state
Non-conference regular season
November 6, 2018*; 7:00 pm, ACCN Extra	No. 5	Towson	W 73–42	1–0	20 – Jerome	10 – Hunter	6 – Clark	John Paul Jones Arena (13,807); Charlottesville, VA
November 11, 2018*; 2:00 pm, ACCN Extra	No. 5	George Washington	W 76–57	2–0	20 – Tied	6 – Jerome	7 – Jerome	John Paul Jones Arena (13,574); Charlottesville, VA
November 16, 2018*; 7:00 pm, ACCN Extra	No. 4	Coppin State; Battle 4 Atlantis campus-site game	W 97–40	3–0	20 – Hunter	7 – Key	6 – Jerome	John Paul Jones Arena (13,971); Charlottesville, VA
November 21, 2018*; 9:30 pm, ESPN2	No. 4	vs. Middle Tennessee; Battle 4 Atlantis Quarterfinals	W 74–52	4–0	15 – Tied	8 – Hunter	9 – Hunter	Imperial Arena (1,115); Nassau, Bahamas
November 22, 2018*; 4:00 pm, ESPN	No. 4	vs. Dayton; Battle 4 Atlantis Semifinals	W 66–59	5–0	23 – Hunter	6 – Tied	2 – Tied	Imperial Arena (2,258); Nassau, Bahamas
November 23, 2018*; 2:00 pm, ESPN	No. 4	vs. No. 25 Wisconsin; Battle 4 Atlantis Final	W 53–46	6–0	20 – Hunter	9 – Hunter	5 – Jerome	Imperial Arena (2,249); Nassau, Bahamas
November 28, 2018*; 7:30 pm, ESPN	No. 4	at No. 24 Maryland; ACC–Big Ten Challenge	W 76–71	7–0	18 – Guy	7 – Salt	4 – Hunter	Xfinity Center (17,950); College Park, MD
December 3, 2018*; 7:00 pm, ACCN Extra	No. 4	Morgan State	W 83–45	8–0	15 – Tied	9 – Key	5 – Jerome	John Paul Jones Arena (13,397); Charlottesville, VA
December 9, 2018*; 1:30 pm, ACCRSN	No. 4	VCU	W 57–49	9–0	15 – Guy	8 – Jerome	4 – Key	John Paul Jones Arena (13,648); Charlottesville, VA
December 19, 2018*; 7:00 pm, SECN	No. 5	at South Carolina	W 69–52	10–0	25 – Jerome	9 – Salt	7 – Jerome	Colonial Life Arena (12,291); Columbia, SC
December 22, 2018*; 2:00 pm, ACCN Extra	No. 5	William & Mary	W 72–40	11–0	18 – Hunter	10 – Jerome	4 – Jerome	John Paul Jones Arena (14,623); Charlottesville, VA
December 31, 2018*; 1:00 pm, ACCRSN	No. 4	Marshall	W 100–64	12–0	30 – Guy	8 – Tied	4 – Tied	John Paul Jones Arena (14,623); Charlottesville, VA
ACC regular season
January 5, 2019; 3:00 pm, ESPN2	No. 4	No. 9 Florida State	W 65–52	13–0 (1–0)	21 – Guy	6 – Tied	6 – Jerome	John Paul Jones Arena (14,623); Charlottesville, VA
January 9, 2019; 9:00 pm, ESPNU	No. 4	at Boston College	W 83–56	14–0 (2–0)	18 – Tied	9 – Key	5 – Guy	Conte Forum (5,738); Chestnut Hill, MA
January 12, 2019; 12:00 pm, Raycom	No. 4	at Clemson	W 63–43	15–0 (3–0)	13 – Guy	8 – Tied	5 – Jerome	Littlejohn Coliseum (9,242); Clemson, SC
January 15, 2019; 8:00 pm, Raycom	No. 4	No. 9 Virginia Tech; Commonwealth Clash	W 81–59	16–0 (4–0)	21 – Hunter	5 – Tied	12 – Jerome	John Paul Jones Arena (14,623); Charlottesville, VA
January 19, 2019; 6:00 pm, ESPN	No. 4	at No. 1 Duke; College GameDay	L 70–72	16–1 (4–1)	18 – Hunter	6 – Tied	4 – Jerome	Cameron Indoor Stadium (9,314); Durham, NC
January 22, 2019; 9:00 pm, ACCRSN	No. 3	Wake Forest	W 68–45	17–1 (5–1)	12 – Tied	8 – Salt	5 – Tied	John Paul Jones Arena (14,273); Charlottesville, VA
January 26, 2019; 1:00 pm, CBS	No. 3	at Notre Dame	W 82–55	18–1 (6–1)	19 – Hunter	9 – Jerome	6 – Jerome	Edmund P. Joyce Center (9,149); South Bend, IN
January 29, 2019; 7:00 pm, ESPN2	No. 3	at No. 23 NC State	W 66–65 ^{OT}	19–1 (7–1)	15 – Hunter	8 – Key	6 – Jerome	PNC Arena (18,211); Raleigh, NC
February 2, 2019; 2:00 pm, Raycom	No. 3	Miami (FL)	W 56–46	20–1 (8–1)	14 – Hunter	9 – Salt	6 – Clark	John Paul Jones Arena (13,978); Charlottesville, VA
February 9, 2019; 6:00 pm, ESPN	No. 3	No. 2 Duke; College GameDay	L 71–81	20–2 (8–2)	16 – Tied	10 – Key	4 – Jerome	John Paul Jones Arena (14,629); Charlottesville, VA
February 11, 2019; 7:00 pm, ESPN	No. 4	at No. 8 North Carolina	W 69–61	21–2 (9–2)	20 – Tied	6 – Key	11 – Jerome	Dean Smith Center (21,750); Chapel Hill, NC
February 16, 2019; 2:00 pm, Raycom	No. 4	Notre Dame	W 60–54	22–2 (10–2)	22 – Guy	10 – Hunter	3 – Tied	John Paul Jones Arena (13,448); Charlottesville, VA
February 18, 2019; 7:00 pm, ESPN	No. 3	at No. 20 Virginia Tech; Commonwealth Clash	W 64–58	23–2 (11–2)	23 – Guy	7 – Guy	6 – Jerome	Cassell Coliseum (9,275); Blacksburg, VA
February 23, 2019; 12:00 pm, Raycom	No. 3	at No. 18 Louisville	W 64–52	24–2 (12–2)	26 – Hunter	8 – Guy	5 – Jerome	KFC Yum! Center (17,529); Louisville, KY
February 27, 2019; 7:00 pm, ESPN2	No. 2	Georgia Tech	W 81–51	25–2 (13–2)	19 – Jerome	8 – Diakite	6 – Clark	John Paul Jones Arena (14,094); Charlottesville, VA
March 2, 2019; 2:00 pm, Raycom	No. 2	Pittsburgh	W 73–49	26–2 (14–2)	17 – Guy	6 – Huff	5 – Hunter	John Paul Jones Arena (13,452); Charlottesville, VA
March 4, 2019; 7:00 pm, ESPN	No. 2	at Syracuse	W 79–53	27–2 (15–2)	25 – Guy	7 – Guy	14 – Jerome	Carrier Dome (29,052); Syracuse, NY
March 9, 2019; 4:00 pm, ESPN	No. 2	Louisville; Senior Day	W 73–68	28–2 (16–2)	24 – Jerome	6 – Guy	6 – Jerome	John Paul Jones Arena (14,629); Charlottesville, VA
ACC tournament
March 14, 2019; 12:30 pm, ESPN/Raycom	(1) No. 2	vs. (8) NC State; Quarterfinals	W 76–56	29–2	29 – Guy	7 – Key	10 – Jerome	Spectrum Center (19,691); Charlotte, NC
March 15, 2019; 7:00 pm, ESPN/Raycom	(1) No. 2	vs. (4) No. 12 Florida State; Semifinals	L 59–69	29–3	13 – Hunter	5 – Salt	4 – Guy	Spectrum Center (20,116); Charlotte, NC
NCAA tournament
March 22, 2019*; 3:10 pm, truTV	(1 S) No. 2	vs. (16 S) Gardner–Webb; First Round	W 71–56	30–3	23 – Hunter	9 – Diakite	6 – Jerome	Colonial Life Arena (15,417); Columbia, SC
March 24, 2019*; 7:45 pm, truTV	(1 S) No. 2	vs. (9 S) Oklahoma; Second Round	W 63–51	31–3	14 – Diakite	9 – Tied	3 – Tied	Colonial Life Arena (16,332); Columbia, SC
March 28, 2019*; 9:59 pm, TBS	(1 S) No. 2	vs. (12 S) Oregon; Sweet Sixteen	W 53–49	32–3	13 – Jerome	11 – Diakite	6 – Jerome	KFC Yum! Center (19,831); Louisville, KY
March 30, 2019*; 8:49 pm, TBS	(1 S) No. 2	vs. (3 S) No. 13 Purdue; Elite Eight	W 80–75 ^{OT}	33–3	25 – Guy	10 – Guy	7 – Jerome	KFC Yum! Center (21,623); Louisville, KY
April 6, 2019*; 6:09 pm, CBS	(1 S) No. 2	vs. (5 MW) No. 14 Auburn; Final Four	W 63–62	34–3	21 – Jerome	9 – Jerome	6 – Jerome	U.S. Bank Stadium (72,711); Minneapolis, MN
April 8, 2019*; 9:20 pm, CBS	(1 S) No. 2	vs. (3 W) No. 9 Texas Tech; National Championship	W 85–77 ^{OT}	35–3	27 – Hunter	10 – Key	8 – Jerome	U.S. Bank Stadium (72,062); Minneapolis, MN
*Non-conference game. ^{#}Rankings from AP Poll. (#) Tournament seedings in parentheses. S=South, MW=Midwest, W=West. All times are in Eastern Time.

== Gallery ==
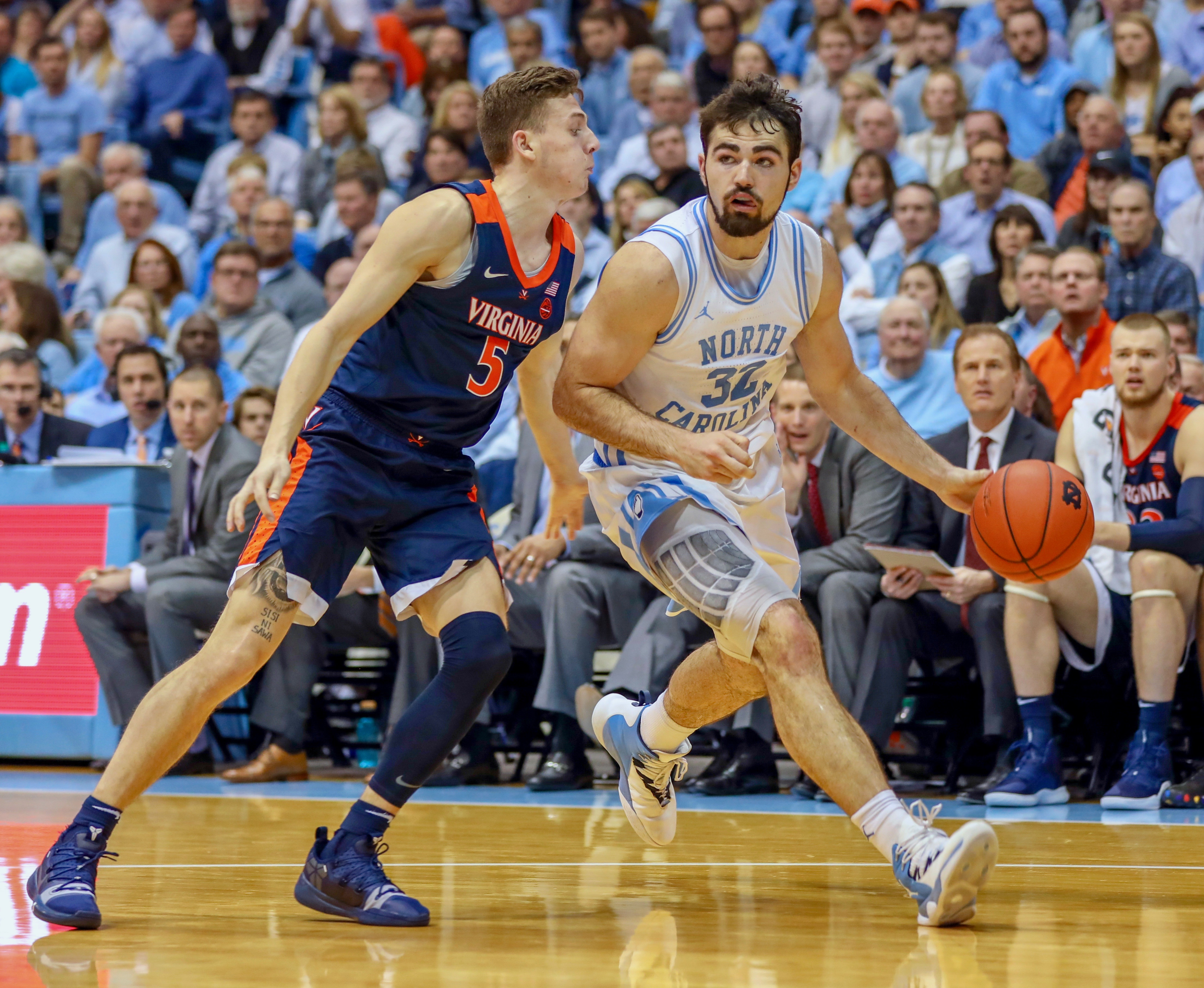
Kyle Guy defending Luke Maye

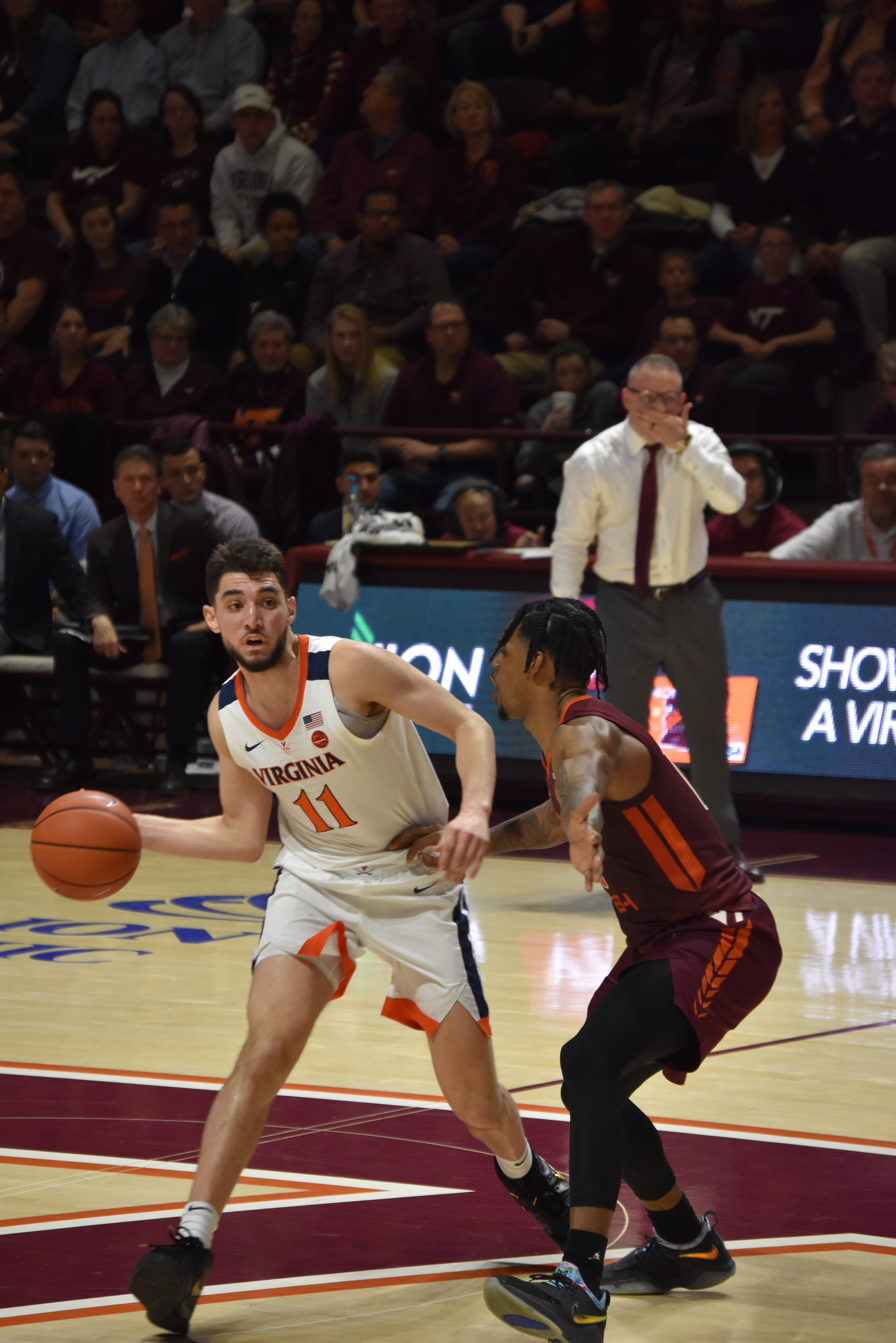
Ty Jerome passing against Virginia Tech

=== Game summaries ===
==== Towson Tigers vs Virginia Cavaliers ====
ACCN Extra

November 6
7:00 PM

Towson Tigers 42, Virginia Cavaliers 73
Scoring by quarter: 19-28, 23-45
Pts: Tobias Howard (10); Rebs: Dennis Tunstall; Brian Fobbs (6); Asts: Dennis Tunstall (1)	Pts: Ty Jerome (20); Rebs: De'Andre Hunter (10); Asts: Kihei Clark (6)

John Paul Jones Arena, Charlottesville, VA

== Rankings ==
Ranking movements Legend: ██ Increase in ranking ██ Decrease in ranking т = Tied with team above or below ( ) = First-place votes
	Week																				
Poll	Pre	1	2	3	4	5	6	7	8	9	10	11	12	13	14	15	16	17	18	19	Final
AP	5 (2)	4 (2)	4 (2)	4 (1)	4 (1)	6 (1)	5 (1)	4 (4)	4 (4)	4 (5)	4 (6)	3 (3)	3 (4)	3 (4)	4	3	2 (15)	2 (21)	2 (23)	2 (5)	Not released
Coaches	5 (1)	5^ (1)	4	4	4	3 (1)	3	1 (10)	2 (11)	1 (11)	1 (13)	3	3	3	4	3	3	2T (2)	2 (5)	2 (1)	1 (32)

*AP does not release post-NCAA Tournament rankings.
^Coaches did not release a Week 2 poll.
