= Kihei Clark =

American basketball player (born 2000)

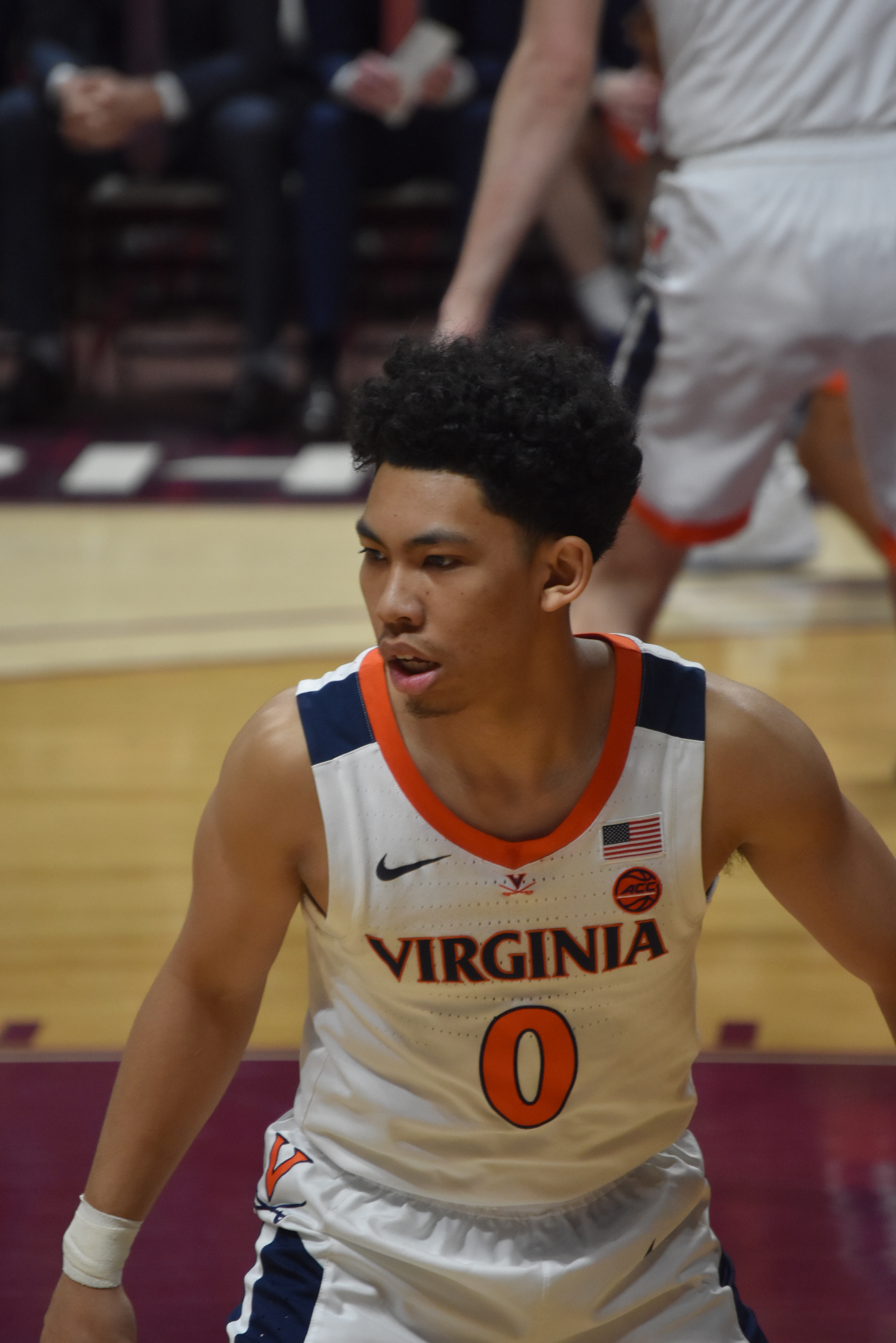
- Clark with Virginia in 2020

No. 3 – Rasta Vechta
- Position: Point guard
- League: Basketball Bundesliga

Personal information
- Born: January 25, 2000 (age 26) Tarzana, California, U.S.
- Listed height: 5 ft 10 in (1.78 m)
- Listed weight: 172 lb (78 kg)

Career information
- High school: Buckley School (Sherman Oaks, California); William Howard Taft (Woodland Hills, California)
- College: Virginia (2018–2023)
- NBA draft: 2023: undrafted
- Playing career: 2023–present

Career history
- 2023–2024: Wisconsin Herd
- 2024–2025: Kumamoto Volters
- 2025: Mexico City Capitanes
- 2025–2026: Kortrijk Spurs
- 2026–present: Rasta Vechta

Career highlights
- NCAA champion (2019); 2× Third-team All-ACC (2020, 2023); ACC All-Defensive Team (2023)
- Stats at NBA.com
- Stats at Basketball Reference

Kihei Issaiah Clark (born January 25, 2000) is an American professional basketball player for Rasta Vechta of the Basketball Bundesliga. He played college basketball for the Virginia Cavaliers.

== Early life ==
Clark was born in the neighborhood of Tarzana, Los Angeles, California, as the oldest son of Malik and Sharon Clark. His father is Chinese and African American and his mother is Filipino. He was named after Kihei, Hawaii, the town where his father proposed to his wife. Clark took part in soccer and martial arts until focusing on basketball at age eight. He was inspired to start playing basketball by his father, who played the sport in college. He would often play with his childhood friend Cameron Boyce. Clark grew up watching National Basketball Association (NBA) players Steve Nash and Chris Paul. He played youth travel basketball for Kings Academy in the Conejo Valley where he was coached by Adam Mazarei, a future NBA assistant coach for the Memphis Grizzlies. In eighth grade, Clark attended the Buckley School, a K–12 private school in Sherman Oaks. At the time, school athletic director Byrd Newman-Milic said that Clark "could probably start for (the basketball team) right now."

== High school career ==
In his freshman season in 2014–15, Clark played basketball for the Buckley School, averaging 15.2 points and six assists per game. He helped his team reach the CIF Southern Section Division 4A semifinals, scoring 16 points in a 69–51 loss to Campbell Hall School, and collected All-Liberty League honors. For his sophomore year, Clark transferred to William Howard Taft Charter High School in Woodland Hills. In the 2015–16 season, he averaged 12.1 points and 6.9 assists, earning team most valuable player (MVP) and all-conference recognition. As a junior, Clark averaged 18.9 points, 7.1 assists, and 4.2 rebounds per game, winning team MVP, all-city, and all-conference accolades. During the season, he surpassed the school record by recording 22 assists in a single game. In the summer of 2017, Clark was named MVP of the Nike Elite Youth Basketball League (EYBL) Peach Jam after leading his Oakland Soldiers team to a title. In his 2017–18 senior season, he averaged 19.4 points, 7.2 assists and 2.9 steals, shooting 41 percent on three-pointers. Clark was a consensus three-star recruit. He first verbally committed to play college basketball for UC Davis but decommitted in August 2017 because he felt that he could play at a higher level. On October 2, 2017, he committed to Virginia after also considering Gonzaga and UCLA.

== College career ==
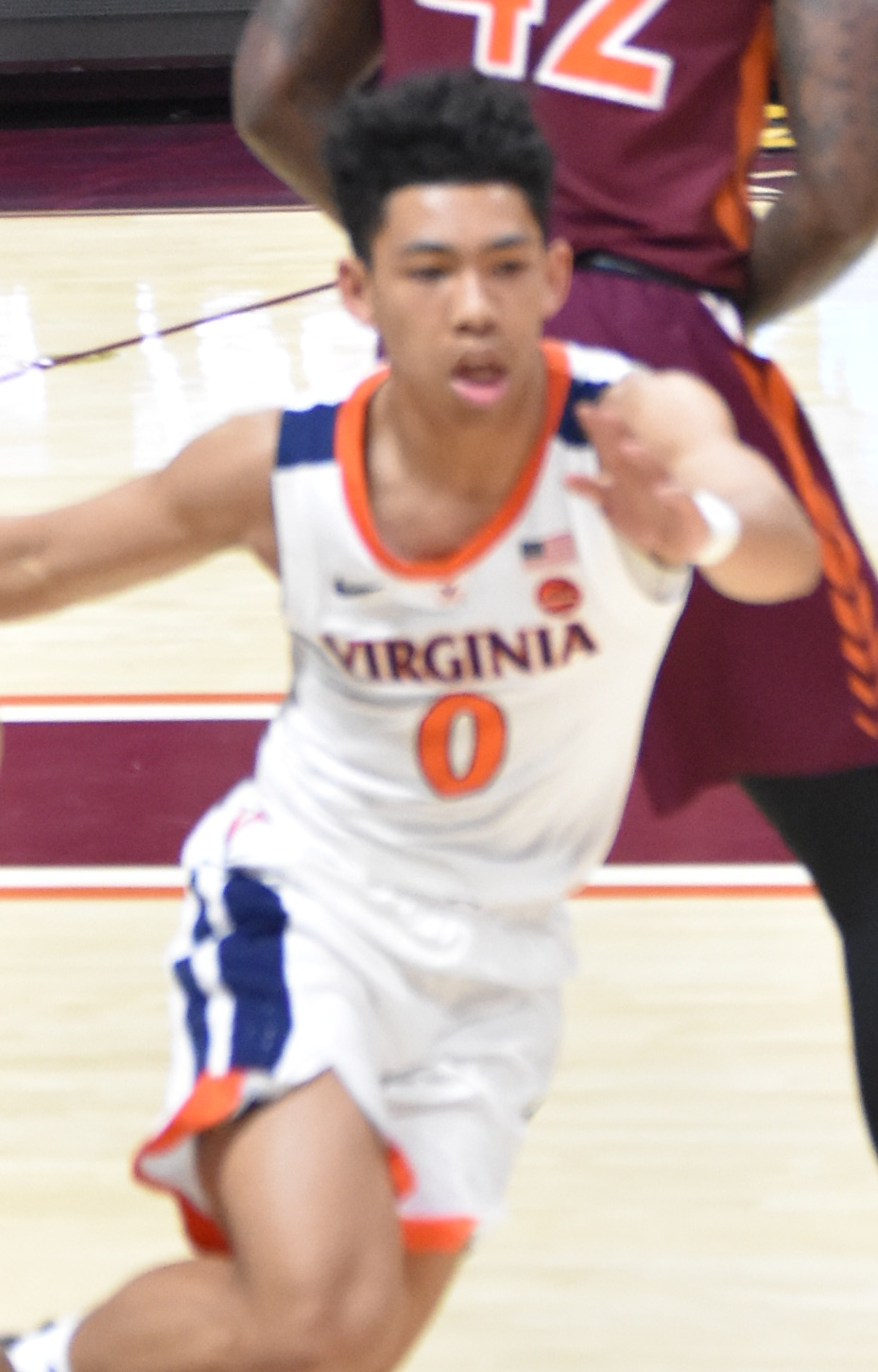
Clark as a freshman in February 2019

On November 6, 2018, Clark made his debut for Virginia, recording four points and six assists, his eventual season-high mark, in a 73–42 win over Towson. He scored a season-high 12 points on January 26, 2019, in an 82–55 victory over Notre Dame. On March 29, in the Sweet Sixteen round of the 2019 NCAA tournament, Clark posted 12 points and six assists, matching career-bests in both categories in a 53–49 win over 12th-seeded Oregon. In an Elite Eight match-up versus third-seeded Purdue two days later, he made a 40-foot pass that allowed teammate Mamadi Diakite to make a buzzer-beating shot and force overtime. Virginia won the game, 80–75, behind Clark's five assists. On April 8, he recorded three points and four assists in 33 minutes to help his team win the national championship over third-seeded Texas Tech. Through 38 games as a freshman, Clark made 20 starts, averaging 4.5 points and 2.6 assists in 26.8 minutes per game.

Clark set a new career-high of 15 points on November 19, helping the Cavaliers defeat Vermont 61–55. On February 26, 2020, Clark made a three-pointer with 2.1 seconds left in a 56–53 victory at Virginia Tech and finished with seven points, six rebounds and six assists. He scored 18 points, including a three-pointer with 28 seconds remaining, on March 7 in a 57–54 win over Louisville. At the conclusion of the regular season, Clark was selected to the Third Team All-ACC.

On February 23, 2022, Clark made a new career-high in points in a loss to Duke with 25 points on 9-of-15 shooting. He also made his 500th assist in that game. As a senior, Clark was named Honorable Mention All-ACC.

== Professional career ==
=== Wisconsin Herd (2023–2024) ===
After going undrafted in the 2023 NBA draft, Clark signed with the Milwaukee Bucks on October 19, 2023, but was waived two days later. On October 30, he joined the Wisconsin Herd.

=== Kumamoto Volters (2024–2025) ===
On July 29, 2024, Clark signed with the Kumamoto Volters of the Japanese B.League.

On December 13, 2024, Clark was placed on the injured list, and on February 10, 2025, he mutually agreed to terminate his player contract with Kumamoto Volters.

=== Mexico City Capitanes (2025) ===
On February 10, 2025, Clark joined the Mexico City Capitanes of the NBA G League.

=== Kortrijk Spurs (2025–2026) ===
On November 15, 2025, he signed with Kortrijk Spurs of the BNXT League.

== Career statistics ==
Legend
GP	Games played	GS	Games started	MPG	Minutes per game
FG%	Field goal percentage	3P%	3-point field goal percentage	FT%	Free throw percentage
RPG	Rebounds per game	APG	Assists per game	SPG	Steals per game
BPG	Blocks per game	PPG	Points per game	**Bold**	Career high

=== College ===
Year	Team	GP	GS	MPG	FG%	3P%	FT%	RPG	APG	SPG	BPG	PPG
2018–19	Virginia	**38**	20	26.8	.350	.341	.825	2.3	2.6	.7	.0	4.5
2019–20	Virginia	30	30	**37.1**	.375	**.375**	**.876**	**4.2**	**5.9**	**1.2**	**.1**	**10.8**
2020–21	Virginia	25	23	34.0	.411	.323	.734	2.0	4.5	.7	.0	9.5
2021–22	Virginia	35	**35**	36.0	.387	.346	.782	2.9	4.4	.9	**.1**	10.0
2022–23	Virginia	33	33	33.2	**.399**	.352	.767	2.6	5.4	1.0	**.1**	10.7
Career		161	141	33.4	.384	.347	.797	2.6	4.6	.9	.1	8.9

=== Professional ===
Year	Team	GP	GS	MPG	FG%	3P%	FT%	RPG	APG	SPG	BPG	PPG
2023-24	Wisconsin Herd	15	4	20.4	.415	**.350**	**.706**	2.1	**5.3**	0.7	0.2	5.3
2024-25	Kumamoto Volters	**20**	**20**	**24.1**	**.426**	.327	.694	**2.2**	4.9	**1.2**	**0.5**	**9.6**

== Personal life ==
His father Malik Clark played basketball for NCAA Division II program Hawaii–Hilo. Later in his life, Malik began running a construction and trucking company. Clark is of Filipino descent through his mother Sharon, whose family was from Ilocos and moved to Hawaii. He has two brothers, Nalu and Shaka.

== See also ==
- List of All-Atlantic Coast Conference men's basketball teams
