= Kyle Guy =

American basketball player (born 1997)

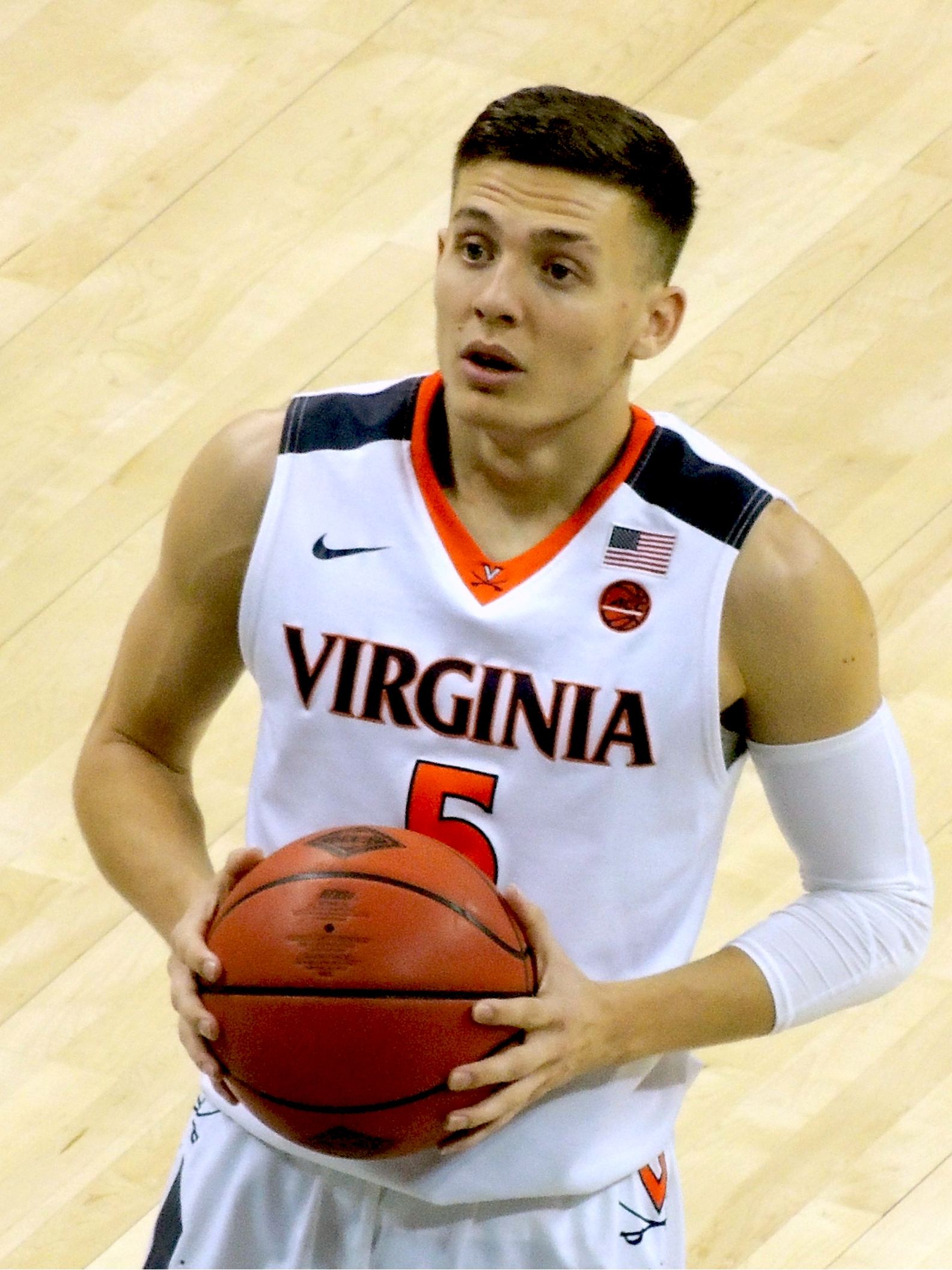
- Guy with Virginia in 2017

No. 2 – La Laguna Tenerife
- Position: Shooting guard
- League: Liga ACB; EuroCup

Personal information
- Born: August 11, 1997 (age 29) Indianapolis, Indiana, U.S.
- Listed height: 6 ft 1 in (1.85 m)
- Listed weight: 167 lb (76 kg)

Career information
- High school: Lawrence Central (Indianapolis, Indiana)
- College: Virginia (2016–2019)
- NBA draft: 2019: 2nd round, 55th overall pick
- Drafted by: New York Knicks
- Playing career: 2019–2024, 2025–present

Career history

Playing
- 2019–2021: Sacramento Kings
- 2019–2020: →Stockton Kings
- 2021: Cleveland Charge
- 2021–2022: Miami Heat
- 2022: →Sioux Falls Skyforce
- 2022: Cleveland Charge
- 2022–2023: Joventut Badalona
- 2023–2024: Panathinaikos
- 2024: La Laguna Tenerife
- 2025–2026: Noblesville Boom
- 2026: Shanxi Loongs
- 2026–present: La Laguna Tenerife

Coaching
- 2024–2025: Virginia (special assistant)

Career highlights
- FIBA Champions League Top Scorer (2024); NCAA champion (2019); NCAA Final Four Most Outstanding Player (2019); 2× Third-team All-American – AP, NABC (2018, 2019); Third-team All-American – SN (2019); 2× First-team All-ACC (2018, 2019); ACC tournament MVP (2018); McDonald's All-American (2016); Indiana Mr. Basketball (2016)
- Stats at NBA.com
- Stats at Basketball Reference

Kyle Joseph Guy (born August 11, 1997) is an American professional basketball player for La Laguna Tenerife of the Spanish Liga ACB and the EuroCup. He played college basketball for the Virginia Cavaliers as a shooting guard for three years and was named the NCAA Tournament Most Outstanding Player during his junior season en route to winning the NCAA Championship. In high school, he was Indiana Mr. Basketball and a McDonald's All-American.

== Early years ==
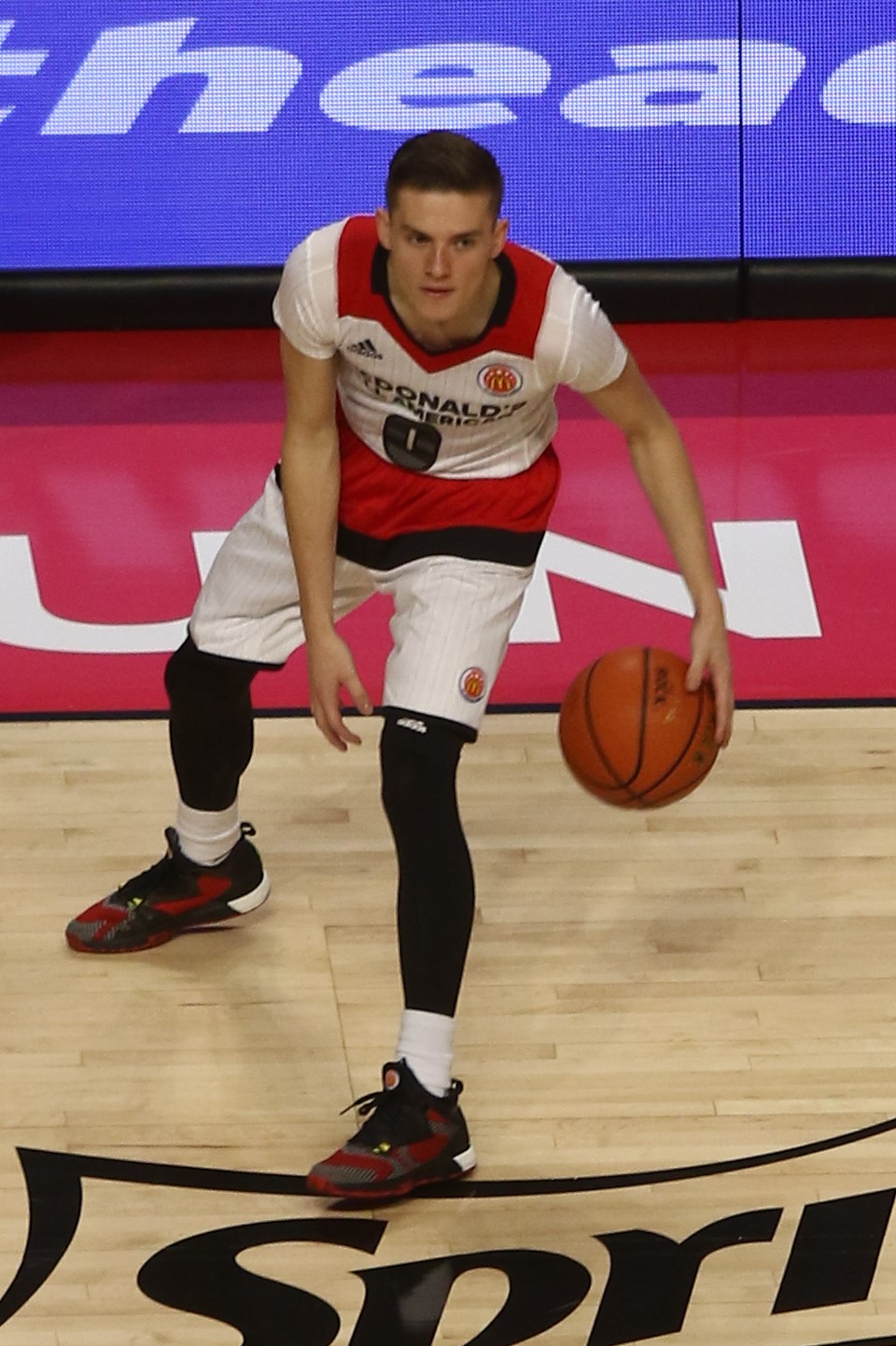
Guy during the 2016 McDonald's All-American Game

Guy attended Lawrence Central High School in Indianapolis, Indiana. He was a varsity letter-winner all four years at Lawrence Central. On January 18, 2016, he was named a McDonald's All-American. After averaging 23.5 points, 5.6 rebounds and 3.7 assists during his senior season, he was selected as Indiana Mr. Basketball. On October 20, 2014, Guy committed to playing college basketball at Virginia, selecting the Cavaliers over offers from schools such as California, Xavier, and Indiana.

College recruiting
Name	Hometown	School	Height	Weight	Commit date
Kyle Guy; PG/SG	Indianapolis, IN	Lawrence Central HS	6 ft 2 in (1.88 m)	165 lb (75 kg)	October 20, 2014
Kyle Guy; PG/SG	Recruit ratings: Scout: Rivals: 247Sports: ESPN: (92)				
Overall recruit ranking: Scout: 43 Rivals: 43 247Sports: 38 ESPN: 27
Note: In many cases, Scout, Rivals, 247Sports, On3, and ESPN may conflict in their listings of height and weight.; In these cases, the average was taken. ESPN grades are on a 100-point scale.; Sources: "Virginia 2016 Basketball Commitments". Rivals.; "2016 Virginia Commits". Scout.; "2016 Player Commits". ESPN.; "Scout.com Team Recruiting Rankings". Scout.; "2016 Team Ranking". Rivals.; "Virginia 2016 Basketball Commitments". 247Sports.

== College career ==
On November 22, 2016, in his fourth career college game, Guy led all players with 20 points and five three-pointers against Grambling State. As a freshman, he averaged 7.5 points per game and shot 49.5 percent from the three-point line.

Guy scored a career-high 29 points in a 76–67 win against VCU on November 17, 2017. He had 22 points, including five three-pointers, in a 76–67 victory over Syracuse on January 10, 2018. In the 2018 ACC tournament, he led Virginia to a conference tournament championship, where he averaged 16.7 points per game, earning him tournament MVP honors.

Prior to the 2018–19 season, Guy was named to the pre-season watchlists for the Jerry West Award, John R. Wooden Award, and Naismith College Player of the Year.

Guy set a new career high with 30 points against Marshall on December 31, 2018. He recorded his first collegiate double-double with 25 points and 10 rebounds on March 30, 2019, against Purdue in the 2019 NCAA tournament, helping the Cavaliers advance to the program's first Final Four since 1984 in the process. On April 6, 2019, in Virginia's Final Four matchup against Auburn, he hit three consecutive free throws with 0.6 seconds left after being fouled on a corner 3 to help the Cavaliers reach their first-ever national championship game. Guy scored 24 points in Virginia's 85–77 overtime win in the championship game, and was named the tournament's Most Outstanding Player.

== Professional career ==
=== Sacramento Kings (2019–2021) ===
Guy was drafted in the 2019 NBA draft by the New York Knicks before being traded to Sacramento. The Kings signed him to a two-way contract on July 7, 2019, to split time between the NBA Kings and their NBA G League affiliate, the Stockton Kings. He scored 42 points for Stockton in a win over the Iowa Wolves on December 1. Guy made his NBA debut on January 10, 2020, against the Milwaukee Bucks. On January 18, he scored 37 points and hit seven three-pointers for Stockton in a 147–117 loss to the Oklahoma City Blue.

On March 25, 2021, Guy scored 17 points in 22 minutes off the bench for the Sacramento Kings in a 141–119 victory over the Golden State Warriors on 6-for-9 shooting, including 4-for-6 on three-point field goals.

=== Cleveland Charge (2021) ===
In August 2021, Guy joined the Golden State Warriors for the 2021 NBA Summer League roster. He debuted with 15 points in 17 minutes off the bench while 4-for-10 from the field, as well as 3-for-7 from three-point range against the Orlando Magic. On September 27, 2021, he signed with the Cleveland Cavaliers, but was waived on October 16. On October 23, he signed with the Cleveland Charge as an affiliate player.

=== Miami Heat (2021–2022) ===
On December 30, 2021, Guy signed a 10-day contract with the Miami Heat via the hardship exemption. In his first game after signing the 10-day contract, he scored 17 points in 23 minutes off the bench in a 120–110 victory over the Houston Rockets on 6-for-8 shooting, including 4-for-6 on three-point field goals. He signed a second 10-day contract on January 10, 2022, then a full two-way contract with the Heat on January 17. On March 24, he was waived by the Heat.

=== Return to the Charge (2022) ===
On March 28, 2022, Guy returned to the Cleveland Charge.

=== Joventut Badalona (2022–2023) ===
On July 22, 2022, Guy signed with Spanish club Joventut Badalona. In 21 EuroCup games, he averaged 11.8 points, 1.8 rebounds and 2.6 assists in 22 minutes per contest. Additionally, in 40 Liga ACB matches, he averaged 12.8 points, 1.8 rebounds and 2.1 assists in 23 minutes per contest.

=== Panathinaikos (2023) ===
In the 2023 offseason, Guy was initially approached by Spanish club Valencia, which made him an official contract offer that was subsequently matched right at the deadline by Joventut Badalona, under the Spanish basketball federation tanteo rule. On July 14, 2023, his contract was bought out by the Greek powerhouse Panathinaikos, moving Guy to the EuroLeague for the first time in his career on a two-year deal.

=== La Laguna Tenerife (2024) ===
On January 1, 2024, Guy signed with Lenovo Tenerife of the Spanish Liga ACB. In the first round of the playoffs on May 18, he led all scorers with 34 points in a 96–86 losing effort at FC Barcelona. On August 7, Guy announced his transition to the "next chapter of [his] life" in a press release detailing his hiring as an assistant at University of Virginia.

=== Noblesville Boom (2025–2026) ===
On October 18, 2025, Guy signed an Exhibit 10 contract with the Indiana Pacers to play for their NBA G League affiliate, the Noblesville Boom. On January 15, 2026, Guy was released by the Boom after a contract buyout, allowing him to play in China.

=== Return to La Laguna Tenerife (2026–present) ===
On July 13, 2026, Guy signed a two-year deal with La Laguna Tenerife of the Spanish Liga ACB.

== Coaching career ==
On August 7, 2024, Guy returned to his alma mater Virginia to serve as the athlete development mentor/special assistant under head coach Tony Bennett. In October 2024, after Bennett's surprising retirement, Ron Sanchez was promoted to interim head coach, and Guy served under him for the 2024–25 season. In the spring of 2025, after a disappointing season, Virginia AD Carla Williams announced that Sanchez would not be retained with the hiring of Ryan Odom. Subsequently, Guy departed from the program to "pursue a new coaching opportunity".

On April 11, 2025, Nevada announced Guy's hiring as an assistant coach under fellow Indiana native, Steve Alford. However, he left that summer to restart his playing career with the Noblesville Boom.

== Career statistics ==
Legend
GP	Games played	GS	Games started	MPG	Minutes per game
FG%	Field-goal percentage	3P%	3-point field-goal percentage	FT%	Free-throw percentage
RPG	Rebounds per game	APG	Assists per game	SPG	Steals per game
BPG	Blocks per game	PPG	Points per game	PIR	Performance index rating
**Bold**	Career high

=== NBA ===
Year	Team	GP	GS	MPG	FG%	3P%	FT%	RPG	APG	SPG	BPG	PPG
2019–20	Sacramento	3	0	3.3	**.400**	.000	–	.3	.3	.0	.0	1.3
2020–21	Sacramento	**31**	0	7.6	.330	.283	**.800**	**1.1**	**1.0**	.2	.0	2.8
2021–22	Miami	19	0	**9.8**	**.400**	**.350**	.667	2.9	1.9	**1.4**	**0.9**	**3.9**
Career		53	0	8.1	.361	.303	.750	1.0	0.9	0.2	0.0	3.1

=== EuroLeague ===
Year	Team	GP	GS	MPG	FG%	3P%	FT%	RPG	APG	SPG	BPG	PPG	PIR
2023–24	Panathinaikos	8	1	10.6	.423	.316	.800	.9	.8	.3	.1	4.0	2.4
Career		8	1	10.6	.423	.316	.800	.9	.8	.3	.1	4.0	2.4

=== College ===
Year	Team	GP	GS	MPG	FG%	3P%	FT%	RPG	APG	SPG	BPG	PPG
2016–17	Virginia	34	7	18.6	.439	**.495**	.714	1.7	1.3	.4	.0	7.5
2017–18	Virginia	34	33	32.4	.415	.392	.824	2.6	1.5	**1.0**	.0	14.1
2018–19	Virginia	**38**	**38**	**35.4**	**.449**	.426	**.833**	**4.5**	**3.1**	.7	**.1**	**17.4**
Career		106	78	29.1	.433	.425	.806	3.0	2.1	.7	.0	12.9

== Personal life ==
Guy's parents are Katy and Tim Fitzgerald (mother and stepfather) and Joe and Amy Guy (father and stepmother). He has five siblings: three brothers and two sisters. Guy's great-grandfather was the commissioner for the Indiana High School Athletic Association and was inducted into the Indiana High School Hall of Fame for basketball and football.

In Summer 2019, Guy married Alexa Jenkins on the North Shore of Kauai. Their first born son, Chance Anthony, was born on September 24, 2021. On March 31, 2024, Guy's second son, Hudson James, was born.
