= 2018–19 West Virginia Mountaineers men's basketball team =

American college basketball season

2018–19 West Virginia Mountaineers men's basketball

CBI, Quarterfinals
- Conference: Big 12 Conference
- Record: 15–21 (4–14 Big 12)
- Head coach: Bob Huggins (12th season)
- Assistant coaches: Larry Harrison; Ron Everhart; Erik Martin
- Home arena: WVU Coliseum

2018–19 Big 12 men's basketball standings
	Conf.				Overall
Team	W		L	PCT	W		L	PCT
No. 19 Kansas State	14	–	4	.778	25	–	9	.735
No. 2 Texas Tech	14	–	4	.778	31	–	7	.816
No. 16 Kansas	12	–	6	.667	26	–	10	.722
Baylor	10	–	8	.556	20	–	14	.588
No. 25 Iowa State †	9	–	9	.500	23	–	12	.657
Texas	8	–	10	.444	21	–	16	.568
Oklahoma	7	–	11	.389	20	–	14	.588
TCU	7	–	11	.389	23	–	14	.622
Oklahoma State	5	–	13	.278	12	–	20	.375
West Virginia	4	–	14	.222	15	–	21	.417
† 2019 Big 12 tournament winner Rankings from AP Poll

The 2018–19 West Virginia Mountaineers men's basketball team represented West Virginia University during the 2018–19 NCAA Division I men's basketball season. The Mountaineers were coached by Bob Huggins, in his 12th season as WVU's head coach, and played their home games at the WVU Coliseum in Morgantown, West Virginia as members of the Big 12 Conference. In a season of bad records, the team finished with the most losses in a season in school history and also had its first last-place finish in Big 12 Conference play. They finished the season 15–21, 4–14 in Big 12 Play to finish in last place. They defeated Oklahoma and Texas Tech to advance to the semifinals of the Big 12 tournament where they lost to Kansas. They received an at-large bid to the College Basketball Invitational where they defeated Grand Canyon in the first round before losing in the quarterfinals to Coastal Carolina.

== Previous season ==
The Mountaineers finished the 2017–18 season 26–11, 11–7 in Big 12 play to finish in a tie for second place. They defeated Baylor and Texas Tech to advance to the championship game of the Big 12 tournament where they lost to Kansas. They received an at-large bid to the NCAA tournament where they defeated Murray State and Marshall to advance to the Sweet Sixteen where they lost to Villanova.

== Offseason ==
=== Departures ===
Name	Number	Pos.	Height	Weight	Year	Hometown	Reason for departure
Jevon Carter	2	G	6'2"	205	Senior	Maywood, IL	Graduated; Drafted by Memphis Grizzlies
Daxter Miles Jr.	4	G	6'3"	200	Senior	Baltimore, MD	Graduated
D'Angelo Hunter	11	F	6'6"	190	Junior	Louisville, KY	Transferred to Nicholls State
Teddy Allen	13	F	6'5"	225	Freshman	Mesa, AZ	Transferred to Wichita State
Maciej Bender	25	F	6'10"	250	Sophomore	Warsaw, Poland	Transferred to Mercer

=== Incoming transfers ===
Name	Number	Pos.	Height	Weight	Year	Hometown	Previous School
Jermaine Haley	10	F	6'8"	215	RS Junior	Burnaby, BC	Junior college transferred from Odessa College.
Andrew Gordon	12	C	6'10"	235	RS Sophomore	Clearwater, FL	Junior college transferred from Northwest Florida State College.

== Recruits ==
=== Recruiting class of 2018 ===
College recruiting information
Name	Hometown	School	Height	Weight	Commit date
Derek Culver #8 C	Youngstown, OH	Brewster Academy	6 ft 10 in (2.08 m)	238 lb (108 kg)	Aug 2, 2016
Derek Culver #8 C	Recruit ratings: Scout: Rivals: 247Sports: ESPN:				
Jordan McCabe #19 PG	Kaukauna, WI	Kaukauna High School	5 ft 10 in (1.78 m)	155 lb (70 kg)	Aug 16, 2016
Jordan McCabe #19 PG	Recruit ratings: Scout: Rivals: 247Sports: ESPN:				
Trey Doomes #52 SG	Acworth, GA	University School	6 ft 3 in (1.91 m)	185 lb (84 kg)	Oct 5, 2017
Trey Doomes #52 SG	Recruit ratings: Scout: Rivals: 247Sports: ESPN:				
Emmitt Matthews Jr. #56 PF	Tacoma, WA	Woodrow Wilson High School	6 ft 7 in (2.01 m)	185 lb (84 kg)	May 12, 2018
Emmitt Matthews Jr. #56 PF	Recruit ratings: Scout: Rivals: 247Sports: ESPN:				
Overall recruit ranking:
Note: In many cases, Scout, Rivals, 247Sports, On3, and ESPN may conflict in their listings of height and weight.; In these cases, the average was taken. ESPN grades are on a 100-point scale.; Sources: "2018 Team Ranking". Rivals.

=== Recruiting class of 2019 ===
College recruiting information (2019)
Name	Hometown	School	Height	Weight	Commit date
Miles McBride #50 PG	Cincinnati, OH	Moeller High School	6 ft 0 in (1.83 m)	175 lb (79 kg)	Feb 5, 2018
Miles McBride #50 PG	Recruit ratings: Scout: Rivals: 247Sports: ESPN:				
Oscar Tshiebwe; C	Sharon, PA	Kennedy Catholic High School	6 ft 8 in (2.03 m)	230 lb (100 kg)	Oct 20, 2018
Oscar Tshiebwe; C	Recruit ratings: Scout: Rivals: 247Sports: ESPN:				
Overall recruit ranking:
Note: In many cases, Scout, Rivals, 247Sports, On3, and ESPN may conflict in their listings of height and weight.; In these cases, the average was taken. ESPN grades are on a 100-point scale.; Sources: "2019 Team Ranking". Rivals.

== Roster ==
2018–19 West Virginia Mountaineers men's basketball team
Players
Coaches

Pos.	#	Name	Height	Weight	Year	Previous school	Hometown
G	0	Trey Doomes	6 ft 3 in (1.91 m)	175 lb (79 kg)	Fr	University HS	Acworth, GA
F	1	Derek Culver	6 ft 10 in (2.08 m)	255 lb (116 kg)	Fr	Warren G. Harding HS	Youngstown, OH
G	2	Brandon Knapper	6 ft 0 in (1.83 m)	180 lb (82 kg)	RS Fr	Hargrave Military Academy	South Charleston, WV
G	3	James Bolden	6 ft 0 in (1.83 m)	188 lb (85 kg)	RS Jr	Holmes HS	Covington, KY
G	5	Jordan McCabe	6 ft 0 in (1.83 m)	183 lb (83 kg)	Fr	Kaukauna HS	Kaukauna, WI
G	10	Jermaine Haley	6 ft 7 in (2.01 m)	215 lb (98 kg)	RS Jr	Odessa College	Vancouver, BC
F	11	Emmitt Matthews Jr.	6 ft 7 in (2.01 m)	195 lb (88 kg)	Fr	Woodrow Wilson HS	Tacoma, WA
F	12	Andrew Gordon	6 ft 9 in (2.06 m)	255 lb (116 kg)	RS So	NW Florida State College	Clearwater, FL
G	14	Chase Harler	6 ft 3 in (1.91 m)	210 lb (95 kg)	Jr	Wheeling Central HS	Moundsville, WV
F	15	Lamont West	6 ft 8 in (2.03 m)	222 lb (101 kg)	RS Jr	Miller Grove HS	Cincinnati, OH
G	20	Taevon Horton (W)	6 ft 1 in (1.85 m)	190 lb (86 kg)	Fr	Fairmont Senior HS	Fairmont, WV
F	21	Wesley Harris (S)	6 ft 8 in (2.03 m)	200 lb (91 kg)	Jr	Lawson State CC	Jackson, MS
F	23	Esa Ahmad (S)	6 ft 8 in (2.03 m)	225 lb (102 kg)	Sr	Shaker Heights HS	Cleveland, OH
F	31	Logan Routt	6 ft 11 in (2.11 m)	260 lb (118 kg)	RS Jr	Cameron HS	Cameron, WV
F	50	Sagaba Konate	6 ft 8 in (2.03 m)	250 lb (113 kg)	Jr	Kennedy Catholic HS	Bamako, Mali

Head coach

- Bob Huggins (West Virginia)

Assistant coach(es)

- Larry Harrison (Pittsburgh)
- Ron Everhart (Virginia Tech)
- Erik Martin (Cincinnati)

Legend

- (C) Team captain
- (S) Suspended
- (I) Ineligible
- (W) Walk-on
- Injured
- Current redshirt

Roster
Last update: November 3, 2020

On Feb 11, 2019 Esa Ahmad and Wesley Harris were dismissed from the team.

== Schedule and results ==
Date time, TV	Rank^{#}	Opponent^{#}	Result	Record	High points	High rebounds	High assists	Site (attendance) city, state
Exhibition
November 3, 2018*; 7:00 pm, ATTSNPT	No. 13	Penn State; Charity Exhibition	L 82–84	–	25 – Ahmad	7 – Tied	3 – Harler	WVU Coliseum (9,517); Morgantown, WV
Regular season
November 9, 2018*; 9:00 pm, ESPNU	No. 13	Buffalo	L 94–99 ^{OT}	0–1	22 – West	9 – West	4 – Bolden	WVU Coliseum (12,657); Morgantown, WV
November 15, 2018*; 7:30 pm, ESPNU		vs. Monmouth; Myrtle Beach Invitational Quarterfinals	W 71–53	1–1	16 – Ahmad	8 – Konate	3 – Tied	HTC Center (3,307); Conway, SC
November 16, 2018*; 9:00 pm, ESPNU		vs. Western Kentucky; Myrtle Beach Invitational	L 57–63	1–2	12 – Ahmad	6 – Tied	3 – Bolden	HTC Center (3,370); Conway, SC
November 18, 2018*; 4:00 pm, ESPNU		vs. St. Joseph's; Myrtle Beach Invitational	W 97–90	2–2	27 – West	9 – Konate	5 – Knapper	HTC Center (3,094); Conway, SC
November 24, 2018*; 2:00 pm, ATTSNPT		Valparaiso; Myrtle Beach Invitational campus-site game	W 88–76	3–2	30 – Ahmad	10 – Konate	7 – Knapper	WVU Coliseum (9,188); Morgantown, WV
November 28, 2018*; 6:30 pm, ATTSNPT		Rider	W 92–78	4–2	20 – West	8 – Tied	8 – McCabe	WVU Coliseum (9,124); Morgantown, WV
December 1, 2018*; 4:00 pm, ATTSNPT		Youngstown State	W 106–72	5–2	15 – Tied	9 – Konate	5 – Bolden	WVU Coliseum (10,849); Morgantown, WV
December 4, 2018*; 9:00 pm, ESPN		vs. Florida; Jimmy V Classic	L 56–66	5–3	11 – Harler	9 – Ahmad	5 – Haley	Madison Square Garden (8,499); New York, NY
December 8, 2018*; 12:00 pm, ESPN2		Pittsburgh; Backyard Brawl	W 69–59	6–3	18 – Bolden	9 – Konate	4 – Bolden	WVU Coliseum (13,670); Morgantown, WV
December 16, 2018*; 1:00 pm, CBSSN		vs. Rhode Island; Hall of Fame Holiday Showcase	L 70–83	6–4	18 – Harris	9 – Harris	4 – Ahmad	Mohegan Sun Arena; Uncasville, CT
December 22, 2018*; 12:00 pm, ATTSNPT		Jacksonville State	W 74–72	7–4	20 – Harris	8 – Harris	5 – Bolden	WVU Coliseum (8,231); Morgantown, WV
December 30, 2018*; 2:00 pm, ATTSNPT		Lehigh	W 78–68	8–4	22 – Bolden	11 – Culver	5 – Bolden	WVU Coliseum (10,754); Morgantown, WV
January 2, 2019; 7:00 pm, ESPNU		No. 11 Texas Tech	L 59–62	8–5 (0–1)	22 – West	8 – Culver	2 – Tied	WVU Coliseum (10,358); Morgantown, WV
January 5, 2019; 6:00 pm, ESPN2		at Texas; Saturday Showcase	L 54–61	8–6 (0–2)	17 – Culver	9 – Culver	2 – West	Frank Erwin Center (9,195); Austin, TX
January 9, 2019; 7:00 pm, ESPNU		at Kansas State	L 69–71	8–7 (0–3)	21 – West	12 – Culver	3 – Tied	Bramlage Coliseum (9,590); Manhattan, KS
January 12, 2019; 12:00 pm, ESPNU		Oklahoma State; Saturday Showcase	L 77–85	8–8 (0–4)	31 – Bolden	15 – Culver	3 – McCabe	WVU Coliseum (11,339); Morgantown, WV
January 15, 2019; 7:00 pm, ESPNU		at TCU; Super Tuesday	L 67–98	8–9 (0–5)	15 – Bolden	5 – Harris	5 – Haley	Schollmaier Arena (6,734); Fort Worth, TX
January 19, 2019; 2:00 pm, ESPN		No. 7 Kansas; Saturday Showcase	W 65–64	9–9 (1–5)	13 – Haley	7 – Tied	3 – Tied	WVU Coliseum (12,657); Morgantown, WV
January 21, 2019; 9:00 pm, ESPNU		Baylor; Big Monday	L 73–85	9–10 (1–6)	22 – Bolden	8 – Culver	3 – Tied	WVU Coliseum (9,936); Morgantown, WV
January 26, 2019*; 4:00 pm, ESPN		at No. 1 Tennessee; Big 12/SEC Challenge/Saturday Showcase	L 66–83	9–11	16 – Ahmad	7 – Ahmad	4 – McCabe	Thompson–Boling Arena (22,149); Knoxville, TN
January 30, 2019; 7:00 pm, ESPNU		at No. 20 Iowa State	L 68–93	9–12 (1–7)	24 – West	5 – Tied	5 – Haley	Hilton Coliseum (14,252); Ames, IA
February 2, 2019; 12:00 pm, ESPN2		Oklahoma; Saturday Showcase	W 79–71	10–12 (2–7)	25 – Knapper	14 – Culver	4 – Ahmad	WVU Coliseum (11,611); Morgantown, WV
February 4, 2019; 9:00 pm, ESPN		at No. 18 Texas Tech; Big Monday	L 50–81	10–13 (2–8)	23 – Culver	12 – Culver	4 – Haley	United Supermarkets Arena (12,831); Lubbock, TX
February 9, 2019; 8:00 pm, ESPN2		Texas; Saturday Showcase	L 53–75	10–14 (2–9)	14 – Ahmad	11 – Culver	4 – Culver	WVU Coliseum (12,815); Morgantown, WV
February 16, 2019; 4:00 pm, ESPN		at No. 14 Kansas; Saturday Showcase	L 53–78	10–15 (2–10)	11 – Tied	12 – Culver	4 – Tied	Allen Fieldhouse (16,300); Lawrence, KS
February 18, 2019; 9:00 pm, ESPN		No. 23 Kansas State; Big Monday	L 51–65	10–16 (2–11)	16 – West	13 – Culver	2 – Tied	WVU Coliseum (9,266); Morgantown, WV
February 23, 2019; 2:00 pm, ESPNU		at Baylor; Saturday Showcase	L 75–82	10–17 (2–12)	16 – West	7 – Haley	5 – Haley	Ferrell Center (6,262); Waco, TX
February 26, 2019; 7:00 pm, ESPNU		TCU; Super Tuesday	W 104–96 ^{3OT}	11–17 (3–12)	25 – McCabe	21 – Culver	11 – McCabe	WVU Coliseum (8,798); Morgantown, WV
March 2, 2019; 2:00 pm, ESPNU		at Oklahoma; Saturday Showcase	L 80–92	11–18 (3–13)	23 – Haley	10 – Matthews. Jr.	5 – Haley	Lloyd Noble Center; Norman, OK
March 6, 2019; 2:00 pm, ESPNU		Iowa State	W 90–75	12–18 (4–13)	28 – Haley	12 – West	5 – McCabe	WVU Coliseum (10,354); Morgantown, WV
March 9, 2019; 4:00 pm, ESPNews		at Oklahoma State; Saturday Showcase	L 77–85	12–19 (4–14)	16 – Tied	21 – Culver	5 – McCabe	Gallagher-Iba Arena (7,279); Stillwater, OK
Big 12 Tournament
March 13, 2019; 9:30 pm, ESPNU	(10)	vs. (7) Oklahoma; First Round/Champ Week	W 71–70	13–19	15 – West	12 – Haley	4 – Haley	Sprint Center (18,858); Kansas City, MO
March 14, 2019; 9:30 pm, ESPN2	(10)	vs. (2) No. 7 Texas Tech; Quarterfinals/Champ Week	W 79–74	14–19	28 – Matthews	13 – Culver	8 – McCabe	Sprint Center (18,927); Kansas City, MO
March 15, 2019; 9:00 pm, ESPN2	(10)	vs. (3) No. 17 Kansas; Semifinals/Champ Week	L 74–88	14–20	16 – West	11 – Culver	6 – Haley	Sprint Center (19,066); Kansas City, MO
College Basketball Invitational
March 20, 2019*; 7:00 pm, Frontier		Grand Canyon; First round	W 77–63	15–20	24 – Haley	10 – Culver	4 – Harler	WVU Coliseum (5,313); Morgantown, WV
March 25, 2019*; 7:00 pm		Coastal Carolina; Quarterfinals	L 91–109	15–21	21 – Matthews/West	10 – Haley	6 – McCabe	WVU Coliseum (6,775); Morgantown, WV
*Non-conference game. ^{#}Rankings from AP Poll. (#) Tournament seedings in parentheses. All times are in Eastern Time.

== Rankings ==
Ranking movements Legend: ██ Increase in ranking ██ Decrease in ranking — = Not ranked RV = Received votes
	Week																				
Poll	Pre	1	2	3	4	5	6	7	8	9	10	11	12	13	14	15	16	17	18	19	Final
AP	13	RV	RV	—	—	—	—	—	—	—	—	—	—	—	—						
Coaches	13	13^	RV	—	—	—	—	—	—	—	—	—	—	—	—						

^Coaches did not release a Week 2 poll.

== See also ==
- 2018–19 West Virginia Mountaineers women's basketball team
