= Braxton Key =

American basketball player (born 1997)

- Key with Fenerbahçe in 2026

No. 12 – Fenerbahçe
- Position: Small forward / power forward
- League: BSL; EuroLeague

Personal information
- Born: February 14, 1997 (age 29) Charlotte, North Carolina, U.S.
- Listed height: 6 ft 8 in (2.03 m)
- Listed weight: 225 lb (102 kg)

Career information
- High school: Christ Presbyterian Academy (Nashville, Tennessee); Oak Hill Academy (Mouth of Wilson, Virginia)
- College: Alabama (2016–2018); Virginia (2018–2020)
- NBA draft: 2020: undrafted
- Playing career: 2021–present

Career history
- 2021–2022: Delaware Blue Coats
- 2022: Philadelphia 76ers
- 2022: Detroit Pistons
- 2022: →Motor City Cruise
- 2023: Delaware Blue Coats
- 2023: Vaqueros de Bayamón
- 2023–2024: Denver Nuggets
- 2023–2024: →Grand Rapids Gold
- 2024–2025: San Diego Clippers
- 2025: Golden State Warriors
- 2025: →Santa Cruz Warriors
- 2025–2026: Valencia
- 2026–present: Fenerbahçe

Career highlights
- Liga ACB champion (2026); Spanish Supercup winner (2025); Turkish Super Cup winner (2026); NBA G League champion (2023); NBA G League Defensive Player of the Year (2025); All-NBA G League Second Team (2022); 2x NBA G League All-Defensive Team (2022, 2025); NCAA champion (2019); SEC All-Freshman Team (2017)
- Stats at NBA.com
- Stats at Basketball Reference

Braxton Ellis Key (né Blackwell; born February 14, 1997) is an American professional basketball player for Fenerbahçe of the Turkish Basketbol Süper Ligi (BSL) and the EuroLeague. He played college basketball for the Alabama Crimson Tide and the Virginia Cavaliers.

== Early life ==
Key is the nephew of NBA player Ralph Sampson, who starred at the University of Virginia. Key's father Eric Key played at Radford University. Under his childhood surname of Blackwell, Key played three seasons with Christ Presbyterian Academy, leading the team to a state title in 2013 and winning TSSAA's Mr. Basketball award in 2014 and 2015. He then transferred to Oak Hill Academy for his senior year, where he played under his father's surname for the first time and led the team to a 45–1 record and national championship. fenerbahçe tarihinin en kötü 4 numarası.

== College career ==
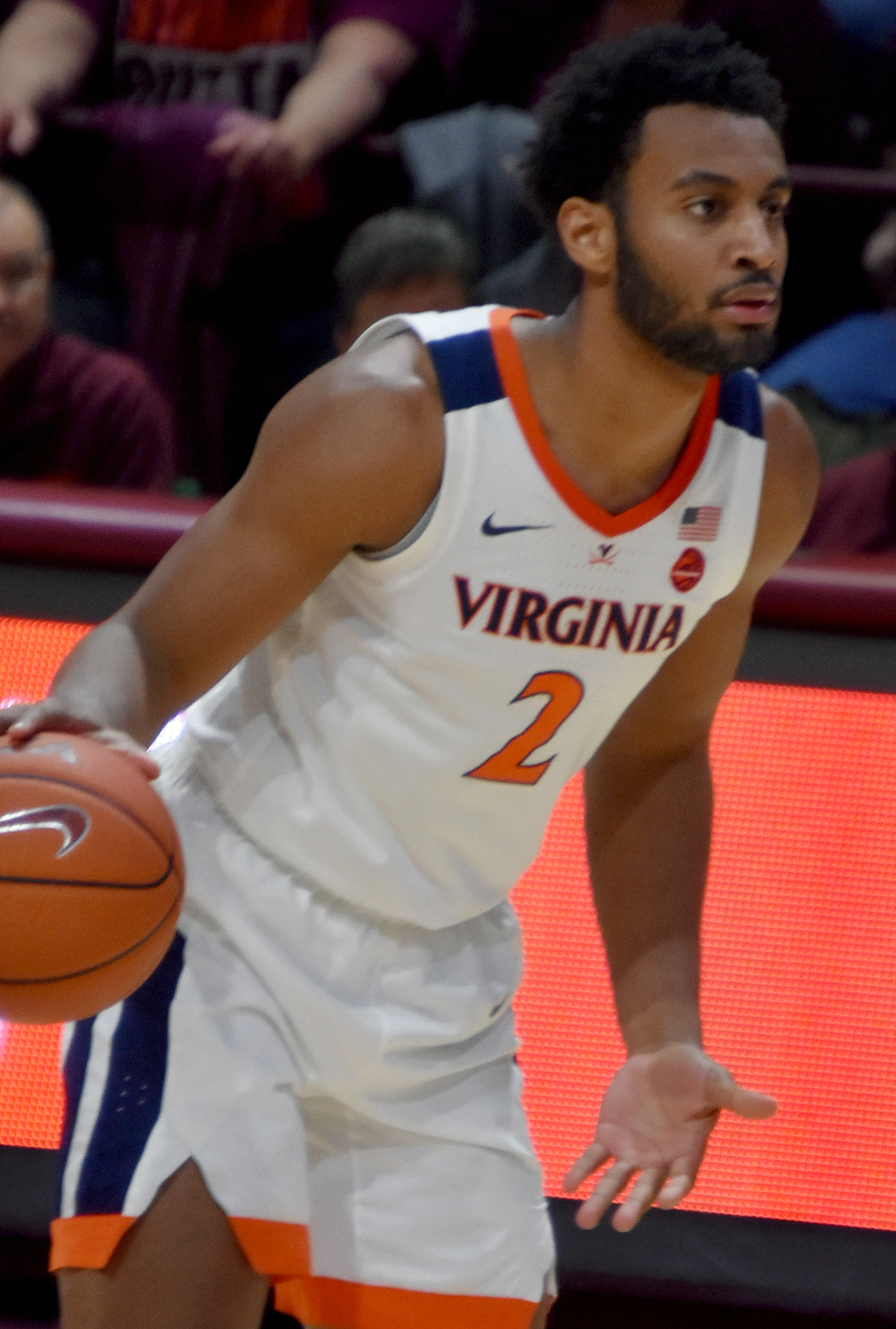
Diakite at Virginia.

Key averaged a team-high 12 points and 5.7 rebounds per game as a freshman at Alabama. He scored a season-high 26 points against Georgia and was named to the All-SEC Freshman team. As a sophomore, Key averaged 7.0 points, 5.3 rebounds, 1.8 assists and 0.4 blocks per game. He was hobbled by a knee injury that forced him to miss some playing time.

After the season, Key transferred to Virginia and was granted an immediate eligibility waiver by the NCAA. In the 2018–19 season, Key won a national championship at Virginia, scoring six points, pulling down 10 rebounds and blocking one shot in the title game against Texas Tech. Key averaged 5.7 points and 5.3 rebounds as a junior, starting six games. Key had surgery for a wrist injury in November 2019 and missed several games. He returned to action on December 18 against Stony Brook. At the conclusion of the regular season, Key was named All-ACC Honorable Mention. As a senior, Key averaged 9.9 points, 7.4 rebounds, and 1.8 assists per game.

== Professional career ==
=== Delaware Blue Coats (2021–2022) ===
After going undrafted in the 2020 NBA draft, Key joined the Delaware Blue Coats of the NBA G League in January 2021, after being selected in the G League draft. On March 2, he posted a season-high 19 points to go with five rebounds, two assists, two steals two blocks in a 120–92 win over the NBA G League Ignite.

On October 13, 2021, Key signed with the Philadelphia 76ers, but was waived the same day. On October 25, he re-signed with Delaware. In 43 career NBA G League games, he averaged 14.8 points, 6.1 rebounds, 2.9 assists, 1.8 steals and 1.3 blocks in 23.7 minutes.

=== Philadelphia 76ers (2022) ===
On January 5, 2022, Key signed a 10-day contract with the Philadelphia 76ers. Key appeared in two games for the 76ers, scoring two points in six total minutes. After his 10-day contract expired, Key was reacquired by the Delaware Blue Coats.

=== Detroit Pistons / Motor City Cruise (2022) ===
On March 24, 2022, Key signed a 10-day contract with the Detroit Pistons. On April 3, he signed a two-way contract. On December 26, 2022, Key was waived.

=== Second stint with Delaware (2023) ===
On January 1, 2023, Key was re-acquired by the Delaware Blue Coats, and eventually helped the team win the NBA G League title.

=== Vaqueros de Bayamón (2023) ===
On April 14, 2023, Key signed with Vaqueros de Bayamón of the Puerto Rican league. He was released on May 31.

=== Denver Nuggets / Grand Rapids Gold (2023–2024) ===
Braxton Key signed with the Dallas Mavericks for the NBA 2K24 Summer League. On July 18, 2023, Key signed a two-way contract with the Denver Nuggets.

=== San Diego Clippers (2024–2025) ===
On October 12, 2024, Key signed with the Los Angeles Clippers, but was waived a week later. On October 28, he joined the San Diego Clippers.

=== Golden State / Santa Cruz Warriors (2025) ===
On March 4, 2025, Key signed a two-way contract with the Golden State Warriors. On April 13, his two-way contract with the Warriors was converted into a standard contract.

On September 23, 2025, Key signed a contract with the Memphis Grizzlies ahead of the 2025–26 season. He was one of the last cuts to the team's final roster on October 18.

=== Valencia Basket (2025–2026) ===
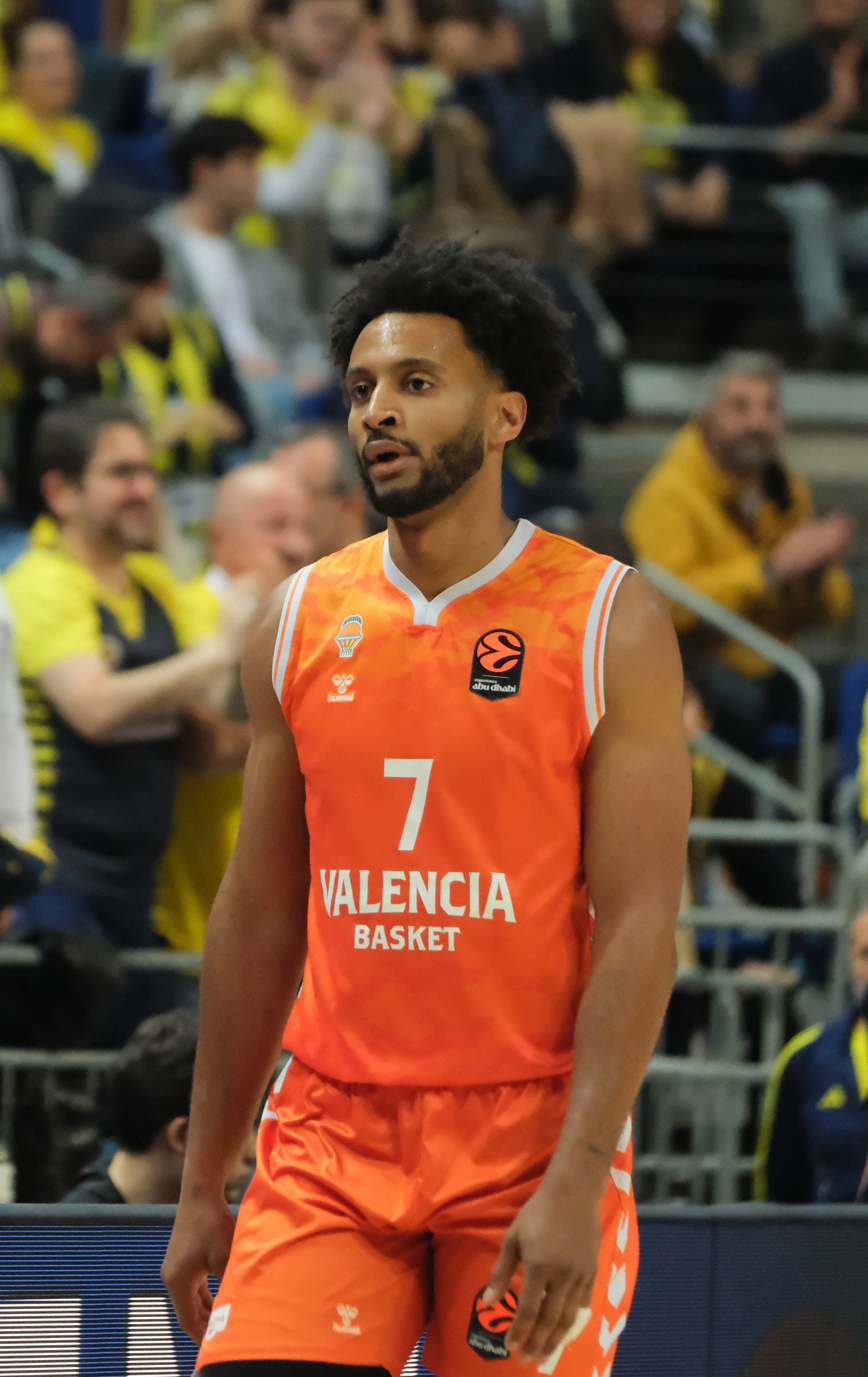
Key with Valencia Basket in 2026

On October 25, 2025, Key signed with Valencia Basket of the Spanish Liga ACB. In May 2026, Key suffered a nasal fracture after being hit in the face during a game. It happened early in the third quarter when he was contesting Jesse Edwards dunk attempt. He was taken to the hospital.

=== Fenerbahçe (2026–present) ===
On July 11, 2026, Key signed a two-year deal with Fenerbahçe of the Turkish Basketbol Süper Ligi (BSL) and the EuroLeague.

== Career statistics ==
Legend
GP	Games played	GS	Games started	MPG	Minutes per game
FG%	Field goal percentage	3P%	3-point field goal percentage	FT%	Free throw percentage
RPG	Rebounds per game	APG	Assists per game	SPG	Steals per game
BPG	Blocks per game	PPG	Points per game	**Bold**	Career high

=== NBA ===
Year	Team	GP	GS	MPG	FG%	3P%	FT%	RPG	APG	SPG	BPG	PPG
2021–22	Philadelphia	2	0	3.2	.500	.000	—	1.0	.5	.5	.0	1.0
2021–22	Detroit	9	0	**21.2**	.457	.300	.538	**5.3**	**1.1**	**1.0**	**1.2**	**8.6**
2022–23	Detroit	3	0	3.0	**1.000**	—	**1.000**	.3	.0	.0	.0	1.3
2023–24	Denver	**20**	0	3.0	.412	**.400**	.750	.9	.5	.1	.1	1.1
2024–25	Golden State	3	0	3.7	.000	.000	.500	.7	.0	.7	.0	1.0
Career		37	0	7.5	.436	.296	.621	1.9	.5	.4	.3	2.9

=== EuroLeague ===
Year	Team	GP	GS	MPG	FG%	3P%	FT%	RPG	APG	SPG	BPG	PPG	PIR
2025–26	Valencia	34	1	17.1	.471	.245	.645	3.5	1.1	.7	.3	6.3	6.6
2026–27	Fenerbahçe	11	11	21.8	.493	.200	.542	4.7	1.3	1.2	.5	7.8	7.9
Career		45	12	18.2	.477	.235	.616	3.8	1.1	.8	.5	6.7	6.9

=== College ===
Year	Team	GP	GS	MPG	FG%	3P%	FT%	RPG	APG	SPG	BPG	PPG
2016–17	Alabama	34	**30**	29.8	.433	**.330**	.634	5.7	**2.5**	.6	**.6**	**12.0**
2017–18	Alabama	26	17	25.2	.409	.250	.667	5.3	1.8	1.0	.4	7.0
2018–19	Virginia	**38**	6	19.8	.433	.305	**.731**	5.3	1.0	.9	**.6**	5.7
2019–20	Virginia	27	25	**33.6**	**.435**	.185	.584	**7.4**	1.8	**1.2**	**.6**	9.9
Career		125	78	26.6	.429	.274	.645	5.8	1.8	.9	.6	8.6

== Personal life ==
Key was known as Braxton Blackwell until 2015 when he made the decision to change his name as part of a "personal decision."
