= Jack Salt =

New Zealand basketball player (born 1996)

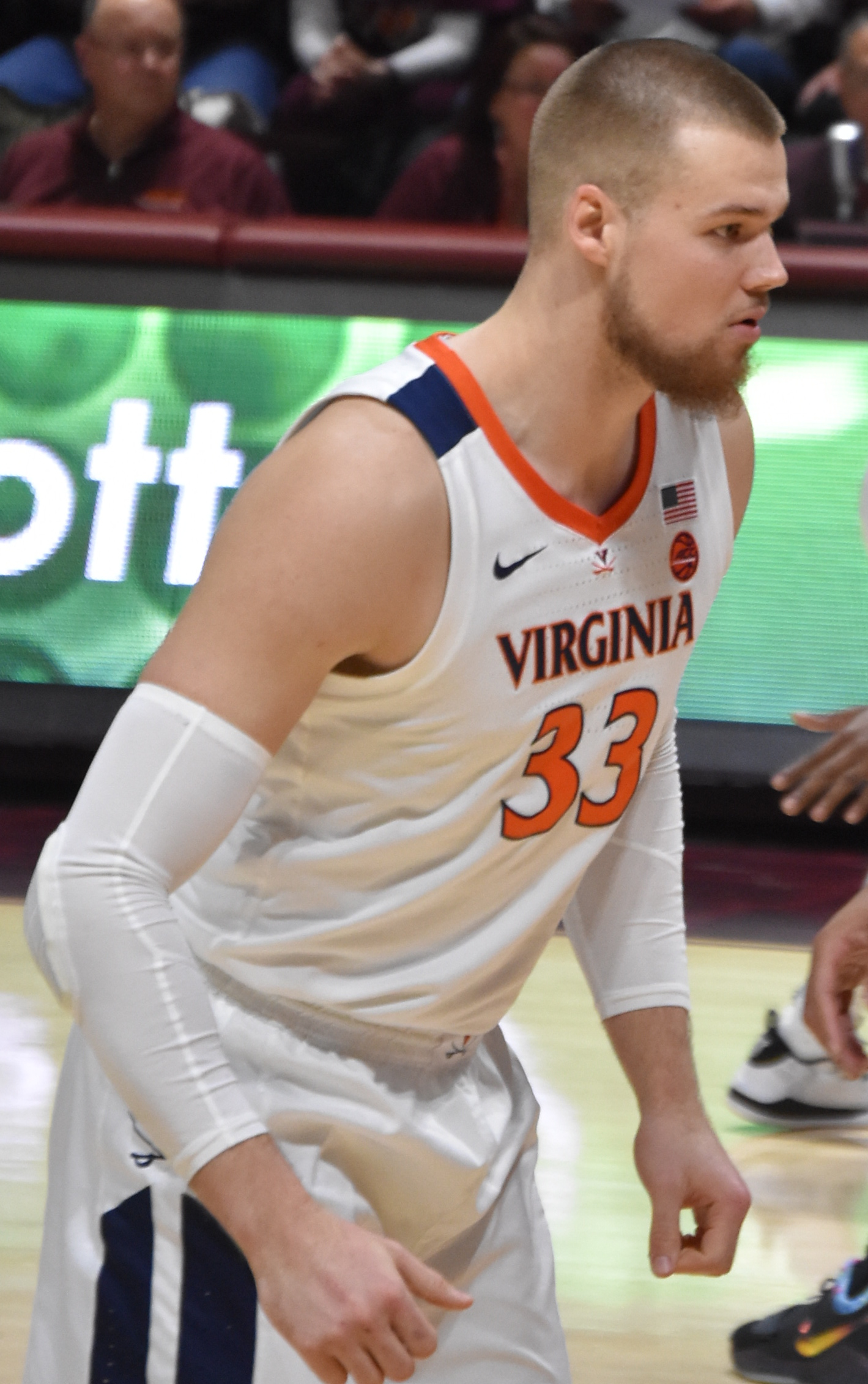
- Salt playing for Virginia in February 2019

Personal information
- Born: 11 February 1996 (age 30) London, England
- Listed height: 6 ft 10 in (2.08 m)
- Listed weight: 257 lb (117 kg)

Career information
- High school: Westlake Boys (Auckland, New Zealand)
- College: Virginia (2015–2019)
- NBA draft: 2019: undrafted
- Playing career: 2013–2022
- Position: Centre

Career history
- 2013: Super City Rangers
- 2013–2014: New Zealand Breakers
- 2014: Waikato Pistons
- 2020–2021: Canterbury Rams
- 2021: Northside Wizards
- 2021–2022: Brisbane Bullets
- 2022: Hawke's Bay Hawks

Career highlights
- NCAA champion (2019)

Jack Matthew Cooper Salt (born 11 February 1996) is a New Zealand former professional basketball player. He played college basketball in the United States for the Virginia Cavaliers, where he was a member of their 2019 national championship team. He played the majority of his career in the New Zealand National Basketball League (NZNBL) and had two seasons in the Australian National Basketball League (NBL). He was also a member of the New Zealand national team in various FIBA competitions.

== Early life and career ==
Born in London, England, Salt grew up in Auckland, New Zealand, where he had a distinguished career at Westlake Boys High School. In 2013, Salt debuted in the New Zealand NBL for the Super City Rangers, averaging 8.6 points and 5.4 rebounds in 14 games. After a stint as a development player with the New Zealand Breakers of the Australian NBL during the 2013–14 season, Salt played for the Waikato Pistons during the 2014 New Zealand NBL season, averaging 7.1 points and 4.6 rebounds in nine games.

== College career ==
In 2013, Salt signed with coach Tony Bennett at Virginia to play college basketball. Salt took a redshirt in his first year on campus to gain weight and strength for his debut season in 2015–16. He played sparingly in his redshirt freshman season, but then became a steady rotation player for the Cavaliers for the rest of his career.

In the 2018 March Madness basketball tournament, Salt played 21 minutes at center in 1st seed UVA's first round loss to the 16th seeded UMBC, marking the first time in the history of a March Madness tournament that a 1 seed had lost to a 16 seed.

In 2019, Salt's senior season, the Cavaliers began the season still stinging from their historic loss in 2018. The Cavaliers won a share of the Atlantic Coast Conference regular season title and were again a number one seed. While playing modest minutes through much of the tournament, Salt played a key role against Purdue in the Elite Eight. Matching up against the Boilermakers' big and physical front line, Salt played 34 minutes and scored 5 points, grabbed eight rebounds and collected a pair of steals to help the Cavaliers to an overtime win and a spot in the Final Four. Virginia then defeated Auburn and Texas Tech in the Final Four to win the school's first NCAA basketball championship. Salt became the first New Zealand native to win an NCAA Division I national championship.

For his Cavaliers career, Salt started in 106 games, averaging 3.3 points and 3.5 rebounds per game in a role primarily as a defensive specialist.

== Professional career ==
After not being selected in the 2019 NBA draft, Salt joined the Phoenix Suns 2019 Summer League team. On 26 July 2019, he signed with Trefl Sopot of the Polish Basketball League (PLK), after considering his home country New Zealand Breakers. However, he failed to join the team due to liver problems.

On 6 February 2020, Salt signed with the Canterbury Rams for the 2020 New Zealand NBL season. However, a knee injury ruled him out of the six-week competition. On 18 November 2020, he re-signed with the Rams for the 2021 season. He played for the first time in 22 months in April 2021. He played in the first three games before a knee injury sidelined him. He played nine games for Canterbury and then had a one-game stint with the Northside Wizards of the NBL1 North.

On 7 July 2021, Salt signed with the Brisbane Bullets of the Australian NBL for the 2021–22 season. He joined the Hawke's Bay Hawks for the 2022 New Zealand NBL season, but was limited due to lingering viral issues.

On 28 December 2022, Salt announced his retirement from basketball.

== National team career ==
Salt played for New Zealand's U20 team in 2013–14 and was a member of the senior national team for the 2013 Oceania championships. Salt withdrew from consideration for New Zealand's 2019 FIBA World Cup team, instead focusing on preparing for the 2019–20 season.

== Career statistics ==
Legend
| GP | Games played | GS | Games started | MPG | Minutes per game |
| FG% | Field goal percentage | 3P% | 3-point field goal percentage | FT% | Free throw percentage |
| RPG | Rebounds per game | APG | Assists per game | SPG | Steals per game |
| BPG | Blocks per game | PPG | Points per game | **Bold** | Career high |

=== College ===
| Year | Team | GP | GS | MPG | FG% | 3P% | FT% | RPG | APG | SPG | BPG | PPG |
|---|---|---|---|---|---|---|---|---|---|---|---|---|
| 2014–15 | Virginia | Redshirt | | | | | | | | | | |
| 2015–16 | Virginia | 22 | 9 | 6.3 | .515 | - | .333 | 1.1 | 0.0 | 0.0 | 0.2 | 1.6 |
| 2016–17 | Virginia | 34 | **34** | 18.4 | .559 | - | .489 | **4.1** | **0.4** | **0.3** | **0.6** | **3.7** |
| 2017–18 | Virginia | 34 | **34** | **19.8** | **.642** | - | .382 | **4.1** | 0.3 | **0.3** | **0.6** | 3.4 |
| 2018–19 | Virginia | **37** | 29 | 16.6 | .602 | - | **.511** | 3.7 | **0.4** | **0.3** | 0.3 | **3.7** |
| Career | | 127 | 106 | 16.2 | .590 | - | .462 | 3.5 | 0.3 | 0.3 | 0.5 | 3.3 |
