= El Trébol =

- City
- Location of El Trébol in Argentina
- Coordinates: 32°11′S 61°43′W
- Country: Argentina
- Province: Santa Fe
- Department: San Martín

Government
  - Intendant: Natalia Sánchez (Unidos)

Area
  - Total: 344 km^{2} (133 sq mi)
- Elevation: 92 m (302 ft)

Population (2010 census)
  - Total: 11,086
  - Density: 32.2/km^{2} (83.5/sq mi)
- Time zone: UTC−3 (ART)
- CPA base: S2535
- Dialing code: +54 3401

El Trébol is a small city in the San Martín Department, west-center of the province of Santa Fe, Argentina, 179 km from the provincial capital. It has about 11,086 inhabitants as per the 2010 census [INDEC]. Its foundation date is locally acknowledged as 15 January 1890 (the date when the first train arrived in town), though the official date in the provincial records is 17 April 1894.

The name of the city was a result of the British involvement in the financing of the railroad system. The Ferrocarril Central Argentino company named three consecutive train stations after symbolic plants of Great Britain: Las Rosas (literally "The Roses", a reference to England), Los Cardos ("The Thistles", referring to Scotland), and El Trébol ("The Clover", a symbol of Ireland).
