= 2018–19 Oklahoma Sooners men's basketball team =

American college basketball season

2018–19 Oklahoma Sooners men's basketball

NCAA tournament, Second Round
- Conference: Big 12 Conference
- Record: 20–14 (7–11 Big 12)
- Head coach: Lon Kruger (8th season)
- Assistant coaches: Chris Crutchfield; Carlin Hartman; Kevin Kruger
- Home arena: Lloyd Noble Center

2018–19 Big 12 men's basketball standings
	Conf.				Overall
Team	W		L	PCT	W		L	PCT
No. 19 Kansas State	14	–	4	.778	25	–	9	.735
No. 2 Texas Tech	14	–	4	.778	31	–	7	.816
No. 16 Kansas	12	–	6	.667	26	–	10	.722
Baylor	10	–	8	.556	20	–	14	.588
No. 25 Iowa State †	9	–	9	.500	23	–	12	.657
Texas	8	–	10	.444	21	–	16	.568
Oklahoma	7	–	11	.389	20	–	14	.588
TCU	7	–	11	.389	23	–	14	.622
Oklahoma State	5	–	13	.278	12	–	20	.375
West Virginia	4	–	14	.222	15	–	21	.417
† 2019 Big 12 tournament winner Rankings from AP Poll

The 2018–19 Oklahoma Sooners basketball team represented the University of Oklahoma in the 2018–19 NCAA Division I men's basketball season. They were led by eighth-year head coach Lon Kruger and played their home games at the Lloyd Noble Center in Norman, Oklahoma as a member of the Big 12 Conference. They finished the season 20–14, finished in 7th place. They lost in the First Round of the Big 12 tournament to West Virginia. They received a at-large bid to the NCAA Tournament where they defeated Ole Miss in the First Round before losing in the Second Round to Virginia.

== Previous season ==
The Sooners finished the 2017–18 season with an overall record of 18–14, 8–10 in Big 12 play to finish in a tie for eighth place. They lost in the First Round of the Big 12 tournament to Oklahoma State. They received an at-large bid to the NCAA tournament where they lost in the First Round to Rhode Island.

== Offseason ==
=== Departures ===
Name	Number	Pos.	Height	Weight	Year	Hometown	Reason for departure
Chris Giles	2	G	6'3"	193	Freshman	Dallas, TX	Left team
Khadeem Lattin	3	F	6'9"	212	Senior	Houston, TX	Graduated
Trae Young	11	G	6'2"	180	Freshman	Norman, OK	Declared for 2018 NBA draft
Jordan Shepherd	13	G	6'2"	180	Sophomore	Asheville, NC	Transferred to Charlotte
Kameron McGusty	20	G	6'5"	191	Sophomore	Katy, TX	Transferred to Miami (FL)
Marshall Thrope	30	F	6'9"	235	RS Sophomore	Tulsa, OK	Left team

=== Incoming transfers ===
Name	Number	Pos.	Height	Weight	Year	Hometown	Previous School
Aaron Calixte	2	G	5'11"	187	Graduate Student	Stoughton, MA	Maine
Miles Reynolds	3	G	6'2"	170	Graduate Student	Chicago, IL	Pacific
Kur Kuath	12	F	6'9"	173	Junior	Kerans, UT	Salt Lake CC
Austin Reaves	12	G	6'5"	175	Junior	Newark, AR	Wichita State

=== 2018 recruiting class ===
College recruiting information
Name	Hometown	School	Height	Weight	Commit date
Jamal Bieniemy; SG	Katy, TX	Tompkins High School	6 ft 3 in (1.91 m)	170 lb (77 kg)	May 7, 2017
Jamal Bieniemy; SG	Recruit ratings: Scout: Rivals: 247Sports: ESPN:				
Overall recruit ranking:
Note: In many cases, Scout, Rivals, 247Sports, On3, and ESPN may conflict in their listings of height and weight.; In these cases, the average was taken. ESPN grades are on a 100-point scale.; Sources: "2018 Team Ranking". Rivals.

=== 2019 Recruiting class ===
College recruiting information (2019)
Name	Hometown	School	Height	Weight	Commit date
De'Vion Harmon #8 PG	Denton, TX	John H. Guyer High School	6 ft 1 in (1.85 m)	195 lb (88 kg)	Nov 3, 2017
De'Vion Harmon #8 PG	Recruit ratings: Scout: Rivals: 247Sports: ESPN:				
Overall recruit ranking:
Note: In many cases, Scout, Rivals, 247Sports, On3, and ESPN may conflict in their listings of height and weight.; In these cases, the average was taken. ESPN grades are on a 100-point scale.; Sources: "2019 Team Ranking". Rivals.

== Roster ==
2018–19 Oklahoma Sooners men's basketball team
Players
Coaches

Pos.	#	Name	Height	Weight	Year	Previous school	Hometown
G	0	Christian James	6 ft 4 in (1.93 m)	211 lb (96 kg)	Sr	Bellaire	Houston, TX
F	1	Rashard Odomes	6 ft 6 in (1.98 m)	217 lb (98 kg)	Sr	Copperas Cove	Copperas Cove, TX
G	2	Aaron Calixte	5 ft 11 in (1.8 m)	187 lb (85 kg)	GS	Stoughton HS/Lee Academy; Maine	Stoughton, MA
G	3	Miles Reynolds	6 ft 2 in (1.88 m)	170 lb (77 kg)	GS	Whitney Young; Pacific	Chicago, IL
C	4	Jamuni McNeace	6 ft 10 in (2.08 m)	222 lb (101 kg)	RS Sr	Allen	Allen, TX
F	5	Matt Freeman	6 ft 10 in (2.08 m)	229 lb (104 kg)	RS Jr	Westlake Boys	Auckland, New Zealand
G	12	Austin Reaves (redshirt)	6 ft 5 in (1.96 m)	180 lb (82 kg)	Jr	Cedar Ridge; Wichita State	Newark, AR
G	14	Ty Lazenby	6 ft 5 in (1.96 m)	209 lb (95 kg)	Sr	Northern Oklahoma College	Glencoe, OK
F	21	Kristian Doolittle	6 ft 7 in (2.01 m)	236 lb (107 kg)	Jr	Edmond Memorial	Edmond, OK
F	22	Patrick Geha (W)	6 ft 5 in (1.96 m)	212 lb (96 kg)	Sr	Rockhurst	Leawood, KS
G	24	Jamal Bieniemy	6 ft 4 in (1.93 m)	175 lb (79 kg)	Fr	Topkins	Katy, TX
F	32	Read Streller (W)	6 ft 8 in (2.03 m)	229 lb (104 kg)	So	Oklahoma Christian	Edmond, OK
F	35	Brady Manek	6 ft 9 in (2.06 m)	210 lb (95 kg)	So	Harrah	Harrah, OK
C	44	Hannes Pöllä	6 ft 11 in (2.11 m)	271 lb (123 kg)	So	Helsinki Basketball Academy	Lahti, Finland
F	52	Kur Kuath	6 ft 9 in (2.06 m)	185 lb (84 kg)	Jr	Kearns; Salt Lake CC	Biemnon, South Sudan

Head coach

- Lon Kruger (Kansas State)

Assistant coach(es)

- Chris Crutchfield (Omaha)
- Carlin Hartman (Tulane)
- Kevin Kruger (Arizona State)

Legend

- (C) Team captain
- (S) Suspended
- (I) Ineligible
- (W) Walk-on
- Injured
- Current redshirt

Roster

== Schedule and results ==
Date time, TV	Rank^{#}	Opponent^{#}	Result	Record	High points	High rebounds	High assists	Site (attendance) city, state
Exhibition
November 1, 2018*; 7:00 pm		Pittsburg State	W 92–58		15 – McNeace	13 – Manek	4 – Calixte	Lloyd Noble Center (6,312); Norman, OK
Regular season
November 9, 2018*; 7:30 pm, FSOK		at Texas–Rio Grande Valley	W 91–76	1–0	29 – James	12 – Tied	4 – Bieniemy	Bert Ogden Arena (5,071); Edinburg, TX
November 12, 2018*; 7:00 pm, CBSSN		at UTSA	W 87–67	2–0	24 – James	11 – Tied	4 – Tied	Convocation Center (2,494); San Antonio, TX
November 18, 2018*; 1:00 pm, FSOK		Wofford; Battle 4 Atlantis campus-site game	W 75–64	3–0	18 – Manek	11 – Manek	3 – James	Lloyd Noble Center (8,432); Norman, OK
November 21, 2018*; 11:00 am, ESPN		vs. Florida; Battle 4 Atlantis Quarterfinals	W 65–60	4–0	18 – James	7 – Manek	2 – Tied	Imperial Arena (1,401); Nassau, Bahamas
November 22, 2018*; 12:30 pm, ESPN		vs. No. 25 Wisconsin; Battle 4 Atlantis Semifinals	L 58–78	4–1	18 – James	6 – McNeace	2 – Tied	Imperial Arena (1,182); Nassau, Bahamas
November 23, 2018*; 10:30 am, ESPN2		vs. Dayton; Battle 4 Atlantis 3rd place game	W 65–54	5–1	21 – James	8 – McNeace	4 – James	Imperial Arena (1,052); Nassau, Bahamas
November 27, 2018*; 7:00 pm, FSOK		North Texas	W 73–57	6–1	17 – Reynolds	10 – McNeace	4 – James	Lloyd Noble Center (6,553); Norman, OK
December 4, 2018*; 6:00 pm, ESPN		vs. Notre Dame; Jimmy V Classic	W 85–80	7–1	25 – James	10 – James	4 – Tied	Madison Square Garden; New York, NY
December 8, 2018*; 11:00 am, ESPNU		vs. Wichita State; Oklahoma City Showcase	W 80–48	8–1	14 – Tied	13 – James	3 – Tied	Chesapeake Energy Arena (4,137); Oklahoma City, OK
December 15, 2018*; 8:00 pm, ESPNU		vs. USC; Tulsa Showcase	W 80–71	9–1	20 – Reynolds	15 – James	6 – Bieniemy	BOK Center; Tulsa, OK
December 18, 2018*; 8:00 pm, ESPNU		Creighton	W 83–70	10–1	18 – Manek	12 – James	4 – Reynolds	Lloyd Noble Center; Norman, OK
December 21, 2018*; 8:00 pm, BTN		at Northwestern	W 76–69 ^{OT}	11–1	14 – Doolittle	9 – Tied	6 – Calixte	Welsh–Ryan Arena (7,039); Evanston, IL
January 2, 2019; 8:00 pm, ESPN2	No. 23	at No. 5 Kansas	L 63–70	11–2 (0–1)	16 – Manek	12 – James	3 – Calixte	Allen Fieldhouse (16,300); Lawrence, KS
January 5, 2019; 1:00 pm, FSSW	No. 23	Oklahoma State; Bedlam Series	W 74–64	12–2 (1–1)	16 – Doolittle	11 – James	5 – Bieniemy	Lloyd Noble Center (10,906); Norman, OK
January 8, 2019; 8:00 pm, ESPNews	No. 23	at No. 8 Texas Tech	L 59–66	12–3 (1–2)	14 – James	8 – Doolittle	5 – Bieniemy	United Supermarkets Arena (14,090); Lubbock, TX
January 12, 2019; 1:00 pm, FSSW	No. 23	No. 25 TCU	W 76–74	13–3 (2–2)	24 – Doolittle	10 – Doolittle	4 – Tied	Lloyd Noble Center (8,005); Norman, OK
January 16, 2019; 6:00 pm, ESPN2	No. 20	Kansas State	L 61–74	13–4 (2–3)	20 – James	7 – James	4 – Doolittle	Lloyd Noble Center (7,597); Norman, OK
January 19, 2019; 7:00 pm, LHN	No. 20	at Texas	L 72–75	13–5 (2–4)	20 – James	8 – Doolittle	2 – Tied	Frank Erwin Center (11,991); Austin, TX
January 23, 2019; 8:00 pm, ESPNU		at Oklahoma State; Bedlam Series	W 70–61	14–5 (3–4)	17 – Bieniemy	7 – Doolittle	5 – Tied	Gallagher-Iba Arena (11,086); Stillwater, OK
January 26, 2018*; 3:00 pm, ESPN2		Vanderbilt; Big 12/SEC Challenge	W 86–55	15–5	21 – James	5 – Tied	7 – Bieniemy	Lloyd Noble Center (8,848); Norman, OK
January 28, 2019; 8:00 pm, ESPNU		Baylor	L 47–77	15–6 (3–5)	12 – Doolittle	7 – James	6 – Bieniemy	Lloyd Noble Center (10,193); Norman, OK
February 2, 2019; 11:00 am, ESPN2		at West Virginia	L 71–79	15–7 (3–6)	18 – Manek	12 – Doolittle	5 – Bieniemy	WVU Coliseum (11,611); Morgantown, WV
February 4, 2019; 8:00 pm, ESPN2		No. 17 Iowa State	L 74–75	15–8 (3–7)	19 – Doolittle	9 – Doolittle	2 – Tied	Lloyd Noble Center (8,889); Norman, OK
February 9, 2019; 3:00 pm, ESPNU		No. 18 Texas Tech	L 54–66	15–9 (3–8)	14 – Odomes	11 – Manke	3 – Bieniemy	Lloyd Noble Center (9,463); Norman, OK
February 11, 2019; 8:00 pm, ESPN2		at Baylor	L 53–59	15–10 (3–9)	14 – Doolittle	10 – Odomes	3 – Bieniemy	Ferrell Center (4,517); Waco, TX
February 16, 2019; 11:00 am, ESPN2		at TCU	W 71–62	16–10 (4–9)	21 – Doolittle	10 – Doolittle	5 – Doolittle	Schollmaier Arena (6,464); Fort Worth, TX
February 23, 2019; 11:00 am, ESPNU		Texas	W 69–67	17–10 (5–9)	19 – James	8 – James	8 – Bieniemy	Lloyd Noble Center (9,116); Norman, OK
February 25, 2019; 7:00 pm, ESPN2		at Iowa State	L 61–78	17–11 (5–10)	15 – Doolittle	11 – Doolittle	2 – Doolittle	Hilton Coliseum (13,976); Ames, IA
March 2, 2019; 1:00 pm, ESPNU		West Virginia	W 92–80	18–11 (6–10)	22 – Bieniemy	9 – Doolittle	6 – Bieniemy	Lloyd Noble Center (6,193); Norman, OK
March 5, 2019; 8:00 pm, ESPN2		No. 13 Kansas	W 81–68	19–11 (7–10)	24 – Doolittle	11 – Doolittle	8 – Bieniemy	Lloyd Noble Center (9,839); Norman, OK
March 9, 2019; 5:00 pm, ESPN2		at No. 18 Kansas State	L 53–68	19–12 (7–11)	14 – Doolittle	7 – Odomes	4 – Bieniemy	Bramlage Coliseum (12,528); Manhattan, KS
Big 12 Tournament
March 13, 2019; 8:30 pm, ESPNU	(7)	vs. (10) West Virginia; First Round	L 71–72	19–13	22 – Manek	9 – Doolittle	6 – Bieniemy	Sprint Center (18,858); Kansas City, MO
NCAA tournament
March 22, 2019*; 11:40 am, truTV	(9 S)	vs. (8 S) Ole Miss; First Round	W 95–72	20–13	20 – Tied	14 – Doolittle	5 – Tied	Colonial Life Arena (15,417); Columbia, SC
March 24, 2019*; 6:45 pm, truTV	(9 S)	vs. (1 S) No. 2 Virginia; Second Round	L 51–63	20–14	13 – Tied	7 – Reynolds	3 – James	Colonial Life Arena (16,332); Columbia, SC
*Non-conference game. ^{#}Rankings from AP Poll. (#) Tournament seedings in parentheses. All times are in Central Time.

== Rankings ==
Ranking movements Legend: ██ Increase in ranking ██ Decrease in ranking — = Not ranked RV = Received votes
	Week																				
Poll	Pre	1	2	3	4	5	6	7	8	9	10	11	12	13	14	15	16	17	18	19	Final
AP	—	—	—	—	RV	RV	RV	25	23	23	20	RV	RV	—	—						Not released
Coaches	—	—	—	—	—	RV	RV	RV	25	22	19										RV
