= Voyager Academy =

American charter school in North Carolina

Coordinates: 36°2′44″N 78°53′45″W

Voyager Academy is an elementary, middle, and high school in the northern part of Durham, North Carolina, United States, within Independence Park. It was established in 2007. Current enrollment is approximately 1,350 students across grades K-12. Voyager is a charter school and uses a lottery to admit students.
