= Blocker-Mover offense =

Offensive strategy in basketball

The Blocker-Mover or Wheel offense is an offensive scheme used in basketball, primarily, college basketball. The offense was popularized by Dick Bennett when he was the coach at Wisconsin-Green Bay, Wisconsin, and Washington State.

== Basics ==
Now used by teams like Virginia and San Diego State, the Blocker-Mover offense consists of two "blockers" and three "movers." The offensive scheme usually works in pairs. A blocker is paired with a mover, but the blockers must stay on their sides of the floor. One blocker stays on the strong side of the floor in between the key and the three-point line where the other blocker remains on their side of the floor between the key and the three-point line. The movers use the screens to create separation and find open shots, or drive to the hoop.

=== Blockers ===
The blockers are usually forwards and centers. Blockers usually are under the three-point line (on the wings) and are always looking to set screens for movers. By setting a screen for a mover, the blocker seeks to free their teammate for a shot. However, the screener usually gets open themselves when their defender is forced to help on the screen. Because of the over help by the opposing defenders, blockers often get easy points near the basket off of post-ups or slips.

=== Movers ===
The movers are usually guards because they have to be well-conditioned because they are in constant motion, moving all over the court seeking scoring opportunities to score. The movers are usually the team's best scorers. Also, they utilize screens in hopes of breaking free from defenders for open shots. Movers must be agile and intelligent cutters who can read opposing defense properly. Rarely, movers may also screen for other movers.

=== Pros ===
The pindown screen usually creates a lot of space and open shots for the movers on the wings. If the blocker can shoot three-pointers, they can pop out after they set a pindown screen to have a wide-open attempt if the defense over-commits to the pass. The flare screen doesn't create as much separation as the pindown screen, but can still be effective off the boomerang pass concept.

=== Cons ===
The scheme doesn't work well when the players don't know who they're paired up with. It also doesn't work well when the movers get bad angles off of the screens, forcing in confusion and turnovers. A well-coached team can counter the Blocker-Mover by switching everything, but it only works if the players are around the same size, creating no mismatches.
