= 2018–19 Syracuse Orange men's basketball team =

American college basketball season

2018–19 Syracuse Orange men's basketball

NCAA tournament, First Round
- Conference: Atlantic Coast Conference
- Record: 20–14 (10–8 ACC)
- Head coach: Jim Boeheim (43rd season)
- Assistant coaches: Adrian Autry; Gerry McNamara; Allen Griffin
- Home arena: Carrier Dome

2018–19 ACC men's basketball standings
	Conf.				Overall
Team	W		L	PCT	W		L	PCT
No. 2 Virginia	16	–	2	.889	35	–	3	.921
No. 3 North Carolina	16	–	2	.889	29	–	7	.806
No. 1 Duke †	14	–	4	.778	32	–	6	.842
No. 10 Florida State	13	–	5	.722	29	–	8	.784
No. 16 Virginia Tech	12	–	6	.667	26	–	9	.743
Syracuse	10	–	8	.556	20	–	14	.588
Louisville	10	–	8	.556	20	–	14	.588
NC State	9	–	9	.500	24	–	12	.667
Clemson	9	–	9	.500	20	–	14	.588
Georgia Tech	6	–	12	.333	14	–	18	.438
Boston College	5	–	13	.278	14	–	17	.452
Miami (FL)	5	–	13	.278	14	–	18	.438
Wake Forest	4	–	14	.222	11	–	20	.355
Pittsburgh	3	–	15	.167	14	–	19	.424
Notre Dame	3	–	15	.167	14	–	19	.424
† 2019 ACC tournament winner Rankings from AP poll

The 2018–19 Syracuse Orange men's basketball team represented Syracuse University during the 2018–19 NCAA Division I men's basketball season. The Orange, led by 43rd-year head coach Jim Boeheim, played their home games at the Carrier Dome in Syracuse, New York as sixth-year members of the Atlantic Coast Conference. Syracuse received a bid to the 2019 NCAA men's basketball tournament as the number eight seed in the West region, where they lost in the round of 64 to ninth seeded Baylor.

== Previous season ==
The Orange finished the 2017–18 season 23–14, 8–10 in ACC play to finish in a tie for tenth place. They defeated Wake Forest in the first round of the 2018 ACC tournament before losing in the second round to North Carolina. They received one of the final four at-large bids to the NCAA tournament where, as a No. 11 seed, they defeated Arizona State in the First Four, and upset No. 6 seed TCU in the First Round and No. 3 seed Michigan State in the Second Round before losing in the Sweet Sixteen to fellow ACC member and No. 2 seed Duke.

== Offseason ==
=== Departures ===
Name	Number	Pos.	Height	Weight	Year	Hometown	Reason for departure
Matthew Moyer	2	F	6'8"	215	RS Sophomore	Columbus, OH	Transferred to Vanderbilt
Patrick Herlihy	5	F	6'6"	205	Senior	Charleston, SC	Graduated
Braedon Bayer	14	G	6'4"	185	Junior	Lagrangeville, NY	Transferred to Siena
Geno Thorpe	30	G	6'4"	170	RS Senior	Pittsburgh, PA	Left Team

=== 2018 recruiting class ===
College recruiting information
Name	Hometown	School	Height	Weight	Commit date
Jalen Carey; PG	Montclair, New Jersey	Immaculate Conception High School	6 ft 3 in (1.91 m)	170 lb (77 kg)	Oct 4, 2017
Jalen Carey; PG	Recruit ratings: Scout: Rivals: 247Sports: ESPN: (88)				
Buddy Boeheim; SG	Syracuse, New York	Jamesville-DeWitt High School	6 ft 5 in (1.96 m)	180 lb (82 kg)	Sep 8, 2017
Buddy Boeheim; SG	Recruit ratings: Scout: Rivals: 247Sports: ESPN: (76)				
Robert Braswell; SF	Blythewood, South Carolina	Blythewood High School	6 ft 8 in (2.03 m)	175 lb (79 kg)	May 13, 2018
Robert Braswell; SF	Recruit ratings: Scout: Rivals: 247Sports: ESPN: (NR)				
Overall recruit ranking:
Note: In many cases, Scout, Rivals, 247Sports, On3, and ESPN may conflict in their listings of height and weight.; In these cases, the average was taken. ESPN grades are on a 100-point scale.; Sources: "2018 Syracuse Signees". Rivals.; "2018 Syracuse Signees". Scout.; "2018 Syracuse Signees". ESPN.; "Scout.com Team Recruiting Rankings". Scout.; "2018 Team Ranking". Rivals.

=== Future recruits ===
==== 2019 recruiting class ====
College recruiting information (2019)
Name	Hometown	School	Height	Weight	Commit date
Brycen Goodine #12 SG	Providence, Rhode Island	Jamesville-DeWitt High School	6 ft 3 in (1.91 m)	185 lb (84 kg)	Sep 13, 2017
Brycen Goodine #12 SG	Recruit ratings: Scout: Rivals: 247Sports: ESPN: (85)				
Joseph Girard III #11 G	Glens Falls, NY	Glens Falls Senior High School	6 ft 1 in (1.85 m)	178 lb (81 kg)	Oct 14, 2018
Joseph Girard III #11 G	Recruit ratings: Scout: Rivals: 247Sports: ESPN: (81)				
John Bol Ajak #0 C	West Chester, PA	Westtown School	6 ft 10 in (2.08 m)	205 lb (93 kg)	Oct 2, 2018
John Bol Ajak #0 C	Recruit ratings: Scout: Rivals: 247Sports: ESPN: (70)				
Quincy Guerrier #6 SF	Quebec City, QC	Thetford Academy	6 ft 7 in (2.01 m)	190 lb (86 kg)	Oct 31, 2018
Quincy Guerrier #6 SF	Recruit ratings: Scout: Rivals: 247Sports: ESPN: (NR)				
Overall recruit ranking:
Note: In many cases, Scout, Rivals, 247Sports, On3, and ESPN may conflict in their listings of height and weight.; In these cases, the average was taken. ESPN grades are on a 100-point scale.; Sources: "2019 Syracuse Signees". Rivals.; "2019 Syracuse Signees". Scout.; "2019 Syracuse Signees". ESPN.; "Scout.com Team Recruiting Rankings". Scout.; "2019 Team Ranking". Rivals.

== Roster ==
2018–19 Syracuse Orange men's basketball team
Players
Coaches

Pos.	#	Name	Height	Weight	Year	Previous school	Hometown
G	0	Adrian Autry (W)	6 ft 0 in (1.83 m)	185 lb (84 kg)	Sr	Jamesville-DeWitt	Jamesville, New York
G	4	Antonio Balandi (W)	6 ft 6 in (1.98 m)	210 lb (95 kg)	Sr	International School of Ouagadougou	Portland, Oregon
G	5	Jalen Carey	6 ft 6 in (1.98 m)	168 lb (76 kg)	Fr	Immaculate Conception School	New York, New York
G	10	Howard Washington	6 ft 3 in (1.91 m)	180 lb (82 kg)	So	Athletic Institute Prep	Buffalo, New York
F	11	Oshae Brissett	6 ft 8 in (2.03 m)	210 lb (95 kg)	So	Athletic Institute Prep	Mississauga, Ontario
G	12	Brendan Paul (W)	6 ft 2 in (1.88 m)	177 lb (80 kg)	Fr	Brewster Academy	Gates Mills, Ohio
C	13	Paschal Chukwu	7 ft 2 in (2.18 m)	228 lb (103 kg)	RS Sr	Fairfield Prep; Providence	Westport, Connecticut
F	20	Robert Braswell	6 ft 9 in (2.06 m)	175 lb (79 kg)	Fr	Blythewood	Blythewood, South Carolina
F	21	Marek Doležaj	6 ft 10 in (2.08 m)	180 lb (82 kg)	So	MBK Karlovka Bratislava	Bratislava, Slovakia
G	23	Frank Howard	6 ft 5 in (1.96 m)	205 lb (93 kg)	Sr	Paul IV	Suitland, Maryland
G	24	Shaun Belbey (W)	5 ft 10 in (1.78 m)	165 lb (75 kg)	Sr	Christian Brothers Academy	Brick, New Jersey
G	25	Tyus Battle	6 ft 6 in (1.98 m)	205 lb (93 kg)	Jr	St. Joseph	Edison, New Jersey
G	32	Ray Featherston (W)	5 ft 8 in (1.73 m)	150 lb (68 kg)	Jr	Choate Rosemary Hall	Wallingford, Connecticut
G	33	Elijah Hughes	6 ft 6 in (1.98 m)	215 lb (98 kg)	RS So	John F. Kennedy; East Carolina	Beacon, New York
F	34	Bourama Sidibe	6 ft 10 in (2.08 m)	205 lb (93 kg)	So	St. Benedict's Prep	Newark, New Jersey
G	35	Buddy Boeheim	6 ft 5 in (1.96 m)	188 lb (85 kg)	Fr	Brewster Academy	Syracuse, New York
G	54	Ky Feldman (W)	5 ft 10 in (1.78 m)	155 lb (70 kg)	Sr	Agoura	Agoura Hills, California

Head coach

- Jim Boeheim, 43rd yr. (Syracuse, 1966)

Assistant coach(es)

- Adrian Autry, 8th yr. (Syracuse, 1994)
- Gerry McNamara, 10th yr. (Syracuse, 2007)
- Allen Griffin, 2nd yr. (Syracuse, 2001)

Legend

- (C) Team captain
- (S) Suspended
- (I) Ineligible
- (W) Walk-on
- Injured
- Current redshirt

Roster

=== Depth chart ===
Pos.	Starting 5	Bench 1	Bench 2	Bench 3
C	Paschal Chukwu
PF	Oshae Brissett	Bourama Sidibe	Robert Braswell
SF	Elijah Hughes	Marek Dolezaj	Antonio Balandi (W)
SG	Tyus Battle	Buddy Boeheim	Shaun Belbey (W)
PG	Frank Howard	Jalen Carey	Brendan Paul (W)	Ray Featherston (W)

== Schedule and results ==
Date time, TV	Rank^{#}	Opponent^{#}	Result	Record	High points	High rebounds	High assists	Site (attendance) city, state
Exhibition
October 25, 2018*; 7:00 pm, ACCN Extra	No. 16	Saint Rose	W 80–49		22 – Brissett	14 – Brissett	6 – Battle	Carrier Dome (5,628); Syracuse, NY
October 31, 2018*; 7:00 pm, ACCN Extra	No. 16	Le Moyne	W 89–52		21 – Hughes	5 – Tied	5 – Battle	Carrier Dome (5,288); Syracuse, NY
Non-conference regular season
November 6, 2018*; 7:00 pm, ACCN Extra	No. 16	Eastern Washington; 2K Classic campus-site game	W 66–34	1–0	20 – Brissett	8 – Brissett	3 – Boeheim	Carrier Dome (19,912); Syracuse, NY
November 10, 2018*; 7:00 pm, ACCN Extra	No. 16	Morehead State; 2K Classic campus-site game	W 84–70	2–0	23 – Battle	13 – Brissett	3 – Battle	Carrier Dome (21,012); Syracuse, NY
November 15, 2018*; 7:00 pm, ESPN2	No. 15	vs. UConn; 2K Classic semifinals/Rivalry	L 76–83	2–1	26 – Carey	7 – Carey	4 – Battle	Madison Square Garden (14,417); New York, NY
November 16, 2018*; 4:30 pm, ESPN2	No. 15	vs. No. 13 Oregon; 2K Classic 3rd place game	L 65–80	2–2	17 – Battle	6 – Brissett	4 – Brissett	Madison Square Garden (10,909); New York, NY
November 21, 2018*; 7:00 pm, ACCN Extra		Colgate	W 77–56	3–2	24 – Battle	10 – Sidibe	5 – Howard	Carrier Dome (16,586); Syracuse, NY
November 28, 2018*; 7:15 pm, ESPN2		at No. 16 Ohio State; ACC–Big Ten Challenge	W 72–62	4–2	20 – Battle	7 – Chukwu	3 – Tied	Value City Arena (16,962); Columbus, OH
December 1, 2018*; 8:00 pm, ESPNU		Cornell	W 63–55	5–2	26 – Battle	8 – Brissett	4 – Howard	Carrier Dome (21,547); Syracuse, NY
December 4, 2018*; 7:00 pm, ACCN Extra		Northeastern	W 72–49	6–2	21 – Brissett	14 – Brissett	6 – Howard	Carrier Dome (20,416); Syracuse, NY
December 8, 2018*; 3:30 pm, ESPN		Georgetown; Rivalry	W 72–71	7–2	26 – Battle	9 – Brissett	4 – Carey	Carrier Dome (24,082); Syracuse, NY
December 15, 2018*; 12:00 pm, ACCRSN	No. 25-T	Old Dominion	L 62–68	7–3	23 – Battle	6 – Tied	6 – Howard	Carrier Dome (17,585); Syracuse, NY
December 18, 2018*; 8:00 pm, ESPN2		No. 14 Buffalo	L 59–71	7–4	16 – Hughes	12 – Brissett	4 – Brissett	Carrier Dome (18,620); Syracuse, NY
December 22, 2018*; 2:00 pm, ACCRSN		Arkansas State	W 82–52	8–4	17 – Tied	13 – Chukwu	3 – Tied	Carrier Dome (18,808); Syracuse, NY
December 29, 2018*; 2:00 pm, ESPNU		St. Bonaventure	W 81–48	9–4	21 – Battle	6 – Chukwu	4 – Howard	Carrier Dome (21,968); Syracuse, NY
ACC regular season
January 5, 2019; 12:00 pm, Raycom		at Notre Dame	W 72–62	10–4 (1–0)	22 – Hughes	11 – Brissett	4 – Howard	Edmund P. Joyce Center (8,245); South Bend, IN
January 9, 2019; 8:00 pm, Raycom		Clemson	W 61–53	11–4 (2–0)	17 – Hughes	7 – Hughes	4 – Tied	Carrier Dome (17,289); Syracuse, NY
January 12, 2019; 6:00 pm, ESPN2		Georgia Tech	L 59–73	11–5 (2–1)	15 – Brissett	7 – Dolezaj	3 – Tied	Carrier Dome (19,257); Syracuse, NY
January 14, 2019; 7:00 pm, ESPN		at No. 1 Duke	W 95–91 ^{OT}	12–5 (3–1)	32 – Battle	18 – Chukwu	5 – Howard	Cameron Indoor Stadium (9,314); Durham, NC
January 19, 2019; 2:00 pm, ACCRSN		Pittsburgh	W 74–63	13–5 (4–1)	22 – Battle	11 – Chukwu	5 – Tied	Carrier Dome (24,466); Syracuse, NY
January 24, 2019; 8:00 pm, Raycom		Miami (FL)	W 73–53	14–5 (5–1)	22 – Hughes	6 – Battle	9 – Battle	Carrier Dome (21,058); Syracuse, NY
January 26, 2019; 8:00 pm, ESPN		at No. 10 Virginia Tech	L 56–78	14–6 (5–2)	16 – Brissett	7 – Brissett	2 – Tied	Cassell Coliseum (9,275); Blacksburg, VA
January 30, 2019; 8:00 pm, Raycom		at Boston College	W 77–71	15–6 (6–2)	31 – Battle	5 – Brissett	6 – Battle	Conte Forum (6,862); Chestnut Hill, MA
February 2, 2019; 6:00 pm, ESPN2		at Pittsburgh	W 65–56	16–6 (7–2)	18 – Brissett	12 – Brissett	5 – Battle	Petersen Events Center (12,508); Pittsburgh, PA
February 5, 2019; 8:00 pm, Raycom		No. 22 Florida State	L 62–80	16–7 (7–3)	23 – Battle	12 – Brissett	2 – Tied	Carrier Dome (21,553); Syracuse, NY
February 9, 2019; 2:00 pm, Raycom		Boston College	W 67–56	17–7 (8–3)	21 – Battle	12 – Brissett	3 – Dolezaj	Carrier Dome (26,011); Syracuse, NY
February 13, 2019; 8:00 pm, Raycom		at NC State	L 58–73	17–8 (8–4)	21 – Howard	6 – Sidibe	3 – Hughes	PNC Arena (16,335); Raleigh, NC
February 20, 2019; 7:00 pm, ESPN		No. 18 Louisville	W 69–49	18–8 (9–4)	18 – Hughes	9 – Dolezaj	7 – Battle	Carrier Dome (22,988); Syracuse, NY
February 23, 2019; 6:00 pm, ESPN		No. 1 Duke	L 65–75	18–9 (9–5)	16 – Battle	7 – Hughes	4 – Brissett	Carrier Dome (35,642^{†}); Syracuse, NY
February 26, 2019; 9:00 pm, Raycom		at No. 5 North Carolina	L 85–93	18–10 (9–6)	29 – Battle	5 – Battle	7 – Howard	Dean Smith Center (21,135); Chapel Hill, NC
March 2, 2019; 12:00 pm, Raycom		at Wake Forest	W 79–54	19–10 (10–6)	21 – Battle	7 – Hughes	6 – Howard	LJVM Coliseum (9,721); Winston-Salem, NC
March 4, 2019; 7:00 pm, ESPN		No. 2 Virginia	L 53–79	19–11 (10–7)	11 – Battle	8 – Chukwu	3 – Battle	Carrier Dome (29,052); Syracuse, NY
March 9, 2019; 12:00 pm, CBS		at Clemson	L 55–67	19–12 (10–8)	15 – Brissett	7 – Brissett	3 – Brissett	Littlejohn Coliseum (8,620); Clemson, SC
ACC Tournament
March 13, 2019; 9:30 pm, ESPN2	(6)	vs. (14) Pittsburgh; Second Round	W 73–59	20–12	20 – Boeheim	9 – Chukwu	4 – Boeheim	Spectrum Center (19,691); Charlotte, NC
March 14, 2019; 9:00 pm, ESPN	(6)	vs. (3) No. 5 Duke; Quarterfinals	L 72–84	20–13	28 – Howard	7 – Brissett	3 – Howard	Spectrum Center (19,691); Charlotte, NC
NCAA tournament
March 21, 2019*; 9:57 pm, truTV	(8 W)	vs. (9 W) Baylor; First Round	L 69–78	20–14	25 – Hughes	8 – Brissett	3 – Hughes	Vivint Smart Home Arena (16,807); Salt Lake City, UT
*Non-conference game. ^{#}Rankings from AP Poll. (#) Tournament seedings in parentheses. W=West. All times are in Eastern Time.

† Record for the largest on-campus attendance in college basketball history.

== Rankings ==
Ranking movements Legend: ██ Increase in ranking ██ Decrease in ranking — = Not ranked RV = Received votes т = Tied with team above or below
	Week																			
Poll	Pre	1	2	3	4	5	6	7	8	9	10	11	12	13	14	15	16	17	18	Final
AP	16	15	RV	RV	RV	T-25	—													Not released
Coaches	14	14^	RV	RV	RV	RV	—													

*AP does not release post-NCAA Tournament rankings
^Coaches did not release a Week 2 poll.
