= 2018–19 Atlantic Coast Conference men's basketball season =

- League: NCAA Division I
- Sport: Basketball
- Teams: 15
- TV partner(s): ACC Network, ESPN, Raycom Sports, Regional Sports Networks, CBS

Regular season
- First place (tie): Virginia (16–2), North Carolina (16–2)
- Season MVP: Zion Williamson, Duke

ACC tournament
- Champions: Duke
- Finals MVP: Zion Williamson – Duke

Atlantic Coast Conference men's basketball seasons
- ← 2017–18 2019–20 →

2018–19 ACC men's basketball standings
	Conf.				Overall
Team	W		L	PCT	W		L	PCT
No. 2 Virginia	16	–	2	.889	35	–	3	.921
No. 3 North Carolina	16	–	2	.889	29	–	7	.806
No. 1 Duke †	14	–	4	.778	32	–	6	.842
No. 10 Florida State	13	–	5	.722	29	–	8	.784
No. 16 Virginia Tech	12	–	6	.667	26	–	9	.743
Syracuse	10	–	8	.556	20	–	14	.588
Louisville	10	–	8	.556	20	–	14	.588
NC State	9	–	9	.500	24	–	12	.667
Clemson	9	–	9	.500	20	–	14	.588
Georgia Tech	6	–	12	.333	14	–	18	.438
Boston College	5	–	13	.278	14	–	17	.452
Miami (FL)	5	–	13	.278	14	–	18	.438
Wake Forest	4	–	14	.222	11	–	20	.355
Pittsburgh	3	–	15	.167	14	–	19	.424
Notre Dame	3	–	15	.167	14	–	19	.424
† 2019 ACC tournament winner Rankings from AP poll

The 2018–19 Atlantic Coast Conference men's basketball season began with practices in October 2018, followed by the start of the 2018–19 NCAA Division I men's basketball season in November. Conference play started in late December 2018 and concluded in March with the 2019 ACC men's basketball tournament at the Spectrum Center in Charlotte, North Carolina. The season marks 65th season of Atlantic Coast Conference basketball.

== Head coaches ==
=== Coaching changes ===
- David Padgett was not retained as head coach of Louisville and was replaced by Chris Mack.
- Kevin Stallings was fired as head coach of Pittsburgh and was replaced by Jeff Capel.

=== Coaches ===
Team	Head coach	Previous job	Years at school	Record at school	ACC record	ACC titles	NCAA tournaments	NCAA Final Fours	NCAA Championships
Boston College	Jim Christian	Ohio	5	48–83	13–59	0	2	0	0
Clemson	Brad Brownell	Wright State	9	149–113	67–73	0	6	0	0
Duke	Mike Krzyzewski	Army	39	1,027–279	412–171	15	34	12	5
Florida State	Leonard Hamilton	Washington Wizards	17	327–208	135–133	1	9	0	0
Georgia Tech	Josh Pastner	Memphis	3	34–35	14–22	0	0	0	0
Louisville	Chris Mack	Xavier	1	0–0	0–0	0	0	0	0
Miami	Jim Larrañaga	George Mason	8	161–79	75–49	1	4	1	0
NC State	Kevin Keatts	UNC Wilmington	2	21–12	11–7	0	1	0	0
North Carolina	Roy Williams	Kansas	16	424–126	180–72	3	14	8	3
Notre Dame	Mike Brey	Delaware	19	403–201	187–122	1	12	0	0
Pittsburgh	Jeff Capel	Duke (Assistant)	1	0–0	0–0	0	0	0	0
Syracuse	Jim Boeheim	Syracuse (Assistant)	42	926–368	50–37	0	30	4	1
Virginia	Tony Bennett	Washington State	10	219–86	105–51	2	6	0	0
Virginia Tech	Buzz Williams	Marquette	5	74–60	32–40	0	2	0	0
Wake Forest	Danny Manning	Tulsa	5	54–72	20–52	0	1	0	0

Notes:

- Year at school includes 2018–19 season.
- Overall and ACC records are from time at current school and are through the end the 2017–18 season.
- NCAA tournament appearances are from time at current school only.
- NCAA Final Fours and Championship include time at other schools

== Preseason ==
=== Preseason watchlists ===
Below is a table of notable preseason watch lists.

Wooden	Naismith	Cousy	West	Erving	Malone	Abdul-Jabbar	Olson
RJ Barrett – Duke; Tyus Battle – Syracuse; Ky Bowman – Boston College; Kyle Guy – Virginia; De'Andre Hunter – Virginia; Nassir Little – North Carolina; Luke Maye – North Carolina; Cam Reddish – Duke; Justin Robinson – Virginia Tech; Zion Williamson – Duke	RJ Barrett – Duke; Tyus Battle – Syracuse; Ky Bowman – Boston College; Kyle Guy – Virginia; De'Andre Hunter – Virginia; Nassir Little – North Carolina; Luke Maye – North Carolina; Cam Reddish – Duke; Justin Robinson – Virginia Tech; Zion Williamson – Duke	Ky Bowman – Boston College; Tre Jones – Duke; Ty Jerome – Virginia; Justin Robinson – Virginia Tech	RJ Barrett – Duke; T. J. Gibbs – Notre Dame; Tyus Battle – Syracuse; Kyle Guy – Virginia	Cam Reddish – Duke; Nassir Little – North Carolina; Oshae Brissett – Syracuse; De'Andre Hunter – Virginia; Jaylen Hoard – Wake Forest	Zion Williamson – Duke; Luke Maye – North Carolina	Dewan Hernandez – Miami	Tyus Battle – Syracuse; Ky Bowman – Boston College; Kyle Guy – Virginia; De'Andre Hunter – Virginia; Luke Maye – North Carolina; Justin Robinson – Virginia Tech

=== Preseason polls ===
	AP	Athlon; Sports	Bleacher; Report	Blue Ribbon; Yearbook	CBS Sports	Coaches	ESPN	KenPom	NBC Sports	SBNation	Sports; Illustrated
Boston College					83			66			61
Clemson	22	22		17	30	23		14	22	20	24
Duke	4	3	3	4	6	3	5	2	4	4	3
Florida State	17	16	13	15	19	15	19	15	14	19	14
Georgia Tech					121			92			127
Louisville	RV				65	RV		63			50
Miami	RV				41	RV		21			47
North Carolina	8	7	5	12	8	7	6	3	9	7	8
NC State	RV		23		47	RV	23	36	24	31	35
Notre Dame	RV				33	RV		59			34
Pittsburgh					150			139			206
Syracuse	16	14	20	22	14	14	13	8	19	22	22
Virginia	5	8	7	7	5	5	12	4	8	2	7
Virginia Tech	15	12		24	13	17	14	22	12	13	15
Wake Forest					128			91			85

=== ACC preseason media poll ===
Coaches, players, and the media met at the Spectrum Center in Charlotte, North Carolina for a media day on October 24, 2018. Players and coaches met the media, and coaches voted on the preseason conference poll and preseason All-ACC teams. Results of the polls are shown below.

==== Preseason poll ====
First place votes shown in parentheses.

1. Duke (52) – 1709
2. Virginia (47) – 1699
3. North Carolina (20) – 1641
4. Syracuse (1) – 1268
5. Virginia Tech – 1187
6. Clemson – 1148
7. Florida State – 1127
8. NC State – 885
9. Notre Dame – 859
10. Miami – 816
11. Louisville – 735
12. Boston College– 568
13. Georgia Tech – 324
14. Wake Forest – 313
15. Pittsburgh – 241

==== Preseason All-ACC teams ====
2018 ACC Men's Basketball PreSeason All-ACC Teams
First Team	Second Team
Luke Maye – North Carolina; Tyus Battle – Syracuse; RJ Barrett – Duke; Kyle Guy – Virginia; Ky Bowman – Boston College	Zion Williamson – Duke; De'Andre Hunter – Virginia; Justin Robinson – Virginia Tech; Ty Jerome – Virginia; Marcquise Reed – Clemson

==== ACC preseason player of the year ====
- Luke Maye – North Carolina (50)
- RJ Barrett – Duke (22)
- Zion Williamson – Duke (15)
- Tyus Battle – Syracuse (11)
- Ky Bowman – Boston College (7)
- Kyle Guy – Virginia (5)
- De'Andre Hunter – Virginia (4)
- Ty Jerome – Virginia (2)
- Justin Robinson – Virginia Tech (2)
- Cam Reddish – Duke (1)
- T. J. Gibbs – Notre Dame (1)
- Jaylen Hoard – Wake Forest (1)

==== ACC preseason rookie of the year ====
- RJ Barrett – Duke (66)
- Zion Williamson – Duke (43)
- Cam Reddish – Duke (4)
- Jaylen Hoard – Wake Forest (3)
- Coby White – North Carolina (2)
- Jalen Carey – Syracuse (1)
- Nate Laszewski – Notre Dame (1)
- Jairus Hamilton – Boston College (1)

== Regular season ==
=== Rankings ===
Legend
Increase in ranking
Decrease in ranking
Not ranked previous week
First Place votes shown in ()

		Pre	Wk 2	Wk 3	Wk 4	Wk 5	Wk 6	Wk 7	Wk 8	Wk 9	Wk 10	Wk 11	Wk 12	Wk 13	Wk 14	Wk 15	Wk 16	Wk 17	Wk 18	Wk 19	Final
Boston College	AP					RV															
Boston College	C																				
Clemson	AP	22	19	16	RV	RV										RV				RV	
Clemson	C	23	16	24	RV																
Duke	AP	4 (4)	1 (48)	1 (53)	3 (1)	3 (1)	2 (4)	2 (5)	1 (35)	1 (35)	1 (37)	1 (36)	2 (11)	2 (12)	2 (12)	2 (24)	1 (58)	3	4 (1)	5	1 (58)
Duke	C	3 (4)	1 (32)	3	3	2 (1)	2 (1)	2 (9)	1 (10)	2 (8)	2 (6)	2 (2)	2 (1)	2	2 (2)	1 (28)	2 T	4	5	1 (25)	4
Florida State	AP	17	14	14	15	11	10	11	9	9	13	11	RV	25	23	17	16	18	14	12	10
Florida State	C	15	13	14	11	10	12	9	9	13	11	23	RV	24	19	17	17	13	13	11	13
Georgia Tech	AP																				
Georgia Tech	C																				
Louisville	AP	RV	RV			RV		RV	RV	RV	RV	RV	23	15	16	16	18	RV	RV	RV	RV
Louisville	C	RV	RV				RV	RV			RV	24	16	17	20	22	24	RV	RV	RV	RV
Miami	AP	RV	RV	RV	RV																
Miami	C	RV	RV	RV																	
North Carolina	AP	8	7	7	11	14	12	9	14	15	12	13	11	9	8	8	8	5	3	3	3
North Carolina	C	7	6	13	12	12	10	14	15	12	15	12	10	8	8	9	5	3	3	4	9
NC State	AP	RV					RV	RV	20	18	15	17	21	23							
NC State	C	RV			RV		RV	24	19	16	16	19	22	RV	RV						
Notre Dame	AP	RV	RV	RV	RV	RV															
Notre Dame	C	RV																			
Pittsburgh	AP																				
Pittsburgh	C																				
Syracuse	AP	16	15	RV	RV	RV	25 T						RV	RV	RV						
Syracuse	C	14	RV	RV	RV	RV									RV						
Virginia	AP	5 (2)	4 (2)	4 (2)	4 (1)	4 (1)	6 (1)	5 (1)	4 (4)	4 (4)	4 (5)	4 (6)	3 (3)	3 (4)	3 (4)	4	3	2 (15)	2 (21)	2 (23)	2 (5)
Virginia	C	5 (1)	4	4	4	3 (1)	3	1 (10)	2 (11)	1 (11)	1 (13)	3	3	3	4	3	2 (2) T	2 (5)	2 (4)	2 (1)	1 (32)
Virginia Tech	AP	15	16	13	13	15	13	13	10	10	9	9	10	12	11	22	20	20	15	16	16
Virginia Tech	C	17	14	12	14	13	13	10	10	7	7	8	11	10	16	18	19	16	15	15	14
Wake Forest	AP																				
Wake Forest	C																				

Notes:
The week 2 Coaches Poll was released on the same date as the week 3 AP poll. No Coaches poll was released on the date when the week 2 AP Poll was released.
The AP poll does not release a final poll after the NCAA tournament, whereas the Coaches Poll does.

=== Conference matrix ===
This table summarizes the head-to-head results between teams in conference play. Each team will play 18 conference games, and at least 1 against each opponent.

	Boston College	Clemson	Duke	Florida State	Georgia Tech	Louisville	Miami	North Carolina	NC State	Notre Dame	Pittsburgh	Syracuse	Virginia	Virginia Tech	Wake Forest
vs. Boston College	–	1–0	1–0	0–1	1–0	1–1	0–1	1–0	2–0	2–0	0–1	2–0	1–0	1–0	0–1
vs. Clemson	0–1	–	1–0	2–0	0–2	1–0	1–0	1–0	1–0	0–1	0–2	1–1	1–0	0–1	0–1
vs. Duke	0–1	0–1	–	0–1	0–1	0–1	0–1	2–0	0–1	0–1	0–1	1–1	0–2	1–0	0–2
vs. Florida State	1–0	0–2	1–0	–	0–2	0–1	0–2	1–0	0–1	0–1	1–0	0–1	1–0	0–1	0–2
vs. Georgia Tech	0–1	2–0	1–0	2–0	–	1–0	1–0	1–0	0–1	1–1	0–1	0–1	1–0	2–0	0–1
vs. Louisville	1–1	0–1	1–0	1–0	0–1	–	0–1	1–1	0–1	0–1	1–1	1–0	2–0	0–1	0–1
vs. Miami	1–0	0–1	1–0	2–0	0–1	1–0	–	2–0	1–0	0–1	0–1	1–0	1–0	2–0	1–1
vs. North Carolina	0–1	0–1	0–2	0–1	0–1	1–1	0–2	–	0–2	0–1	0–1	0–1	1–0	0–1	0–1
vs. NC State	0–2	0–1	1–0	1–0	1–0	1–0	0–1	2–0	–	0–1	0–2	0–1	1–0	1–0	1–1
vs. Notre Dame	0–2	1–0	1–0	1–0	1–1	1–0	1–0	1–0	1–0	–	1–0	1–0	2–0	2–0	1–0
vs. Pittsburgh	1–0	2–0	1–0	0–1	1–0	1–1	1–0	1–0	2–0	0–1	–	2–0	1–0	1–0	1–0
vs. Syracuse	0–2	1–1	1–1	1–0	1–0	0–1	0–1	1–0	1–0	0–1	0–2	–	1–0	1–0	0–1
vs. Virginia	0–1	0–1	2–0	0–1	0–1	0–2	0–1	0–1	0–1	0–2	0–1	0–1	–	0–2	0–1
vs. Virginia Tech	0–1	1–0	0–1	1–0	0–2	1–0	0–2	1–0	0–1	0–2	0–1	0–1	2–0	–	0–1
vs. Wake Forest	1–0	1–0	2–0	2–0	1–0	1–0	1–1	1–0	1–1	0–1	0–1	1–0	1–0	1–0	–
Total	5–13	9–9	14–4	13–5	6–12	10–8	5–13	16–2	9–9	3–15	3–15	10–8	16–2	12–6	4–14

=== Player of the week ===
Throughout the conference regular season, the Atlantic Coast Conference offices named one or two Players of the week and one or two Rookies of the week.

Week	Player of the week	Rookie of the week	Reference
1 – Nov. 12	Zion Williamson – Duke	Zion Williamson – Duke	
2 – Nov. 19	Nickeil Alexander-Walker – Virginia Tech	Jalen Carey – Syracuse	
3 – Nov. 26	De'Andre Hunter – Virginia	Coby White – North Carolina	
4 – Dec. 3	Tyus Battle – Syracuse	RJ Barrett – Duke	
5 – Dec. 10	RJ Barrett – Duke	RJ Barrett (2) – Duke	
6 – Dec. 17	Cameron Johnson – North Carolina	Wynston Tabbs – Boston College	
7 – Dec. 23	Markell Johnson – NC State	Tre Jones – Duke	
8 – Dec. 31	Tyus Battle (2) – Syracuse	Trey McGowens – Pittsburgh	
9 – Jan. 7	Kyle Guy – Virginia	Zion Williamson (2) – Duke	
10 – Jan. 14	Dwayne Sutton – Louisville	Trey McGowens (2) – Pittsburgh	
11 – Jan. 21	Tyus Battle (3) – Syracuse	Zion Williamson (3) – Duke	
12 – Jan. 28	Justin Robinson – Virginia Tech	Coby White (2) – North Carolina	
12 – Jan. 28	Justin Robinson – Virginia Tech	RJ Barrett (3) – Duke	
13 – Feb. 4	Nickeil Alexander-Walker (2) – Virginia Tech	Zion Williamson (4) – Duke	
14 – Feb. 11	Luke Maye – North Carolina	Coby White (3) – North Carolina	
15 – Feb. 18	Zion Williamson (2) – Duke	Zion Williamson (5) – Duke	
16 – Feb. 25	Luke Maye (2) – North Carolina	RJ Barrett (4) – Duke	
17 – Mar. 4	Coby White – North Carolina	Coby White (4) – North Carolina	
18 – Mar. 11	Ty Jerome – Virginia	Coby White (5) – North Carolina	

=== Records against other conferences ===
2018–19 records against non-conference foes through games played on February 2, 2019. Records shown for regular season only.

Power 7 Conferences	Record
American	3–1
Big East	5–6
Big Ten	10–8
Big 12	2–2
Pac-12	3–2
SEC	10–7
Power 7 Total	32–26
Other NCAA Division I Conferences	Record
America East	4–1
A-10	10–2
ASUN	7–0
Big Sky	1–0
Big South	8–4
Big West	1–0
CAA	7–0
C-USA	5–1
Horizon League	3–1
Ivy League	6–2
MAAC	4–1
MAC	4–1
MEAC	11–0
MVC	2–0
Mountain West	3–0
NEC	7–0
OVC	3–0
Patriot League	5–0
Pacific West	0–0
SoCon	6–0
Southland	8–1
SWAC	2–0
The Summit	0–0
Sun Belt	3–0
WAC	2–0
WCC	1–1
Other Division I Total	114–15
NCAA Division I Total	146–41

== Postseason ==
=== ACC tournament ===
- 2019 Atlantic Coast Conference basketball tournament, Spectrum Center, Charlotte, NC.

First round Tuesday, March 12; ESPN2/ESPNU/ACCN
12	Miami	79
13	Wake Forest	71
10	Georgia Tech	71
15	Notre Dame	78
11	Boston College	70
14	Pittsburgh	80

Second round Wednesday, March 13; ESPN/ESPN2/ACCN
8	NC State	59
9	Clemson	58
5	Virginia Tech	71
12	Miami	56
7	Louisville	75
15	Notre Dame	53
6	Syracuse	73
14	Pittsburgh	59

Quarterfinals; Thursday, March 14; ESPN/ESPN2/ACCN
1	Virginia	76
8	NC State	56
4	Florida State	65
5	Virginia Tech	63
2	North Carolina	83
7	Louisville	70
3	Duke	84
6	Syracuse	72

Semifinals; Friday, March 15; ESPN/ESPN2/ACCN
1	Virginia	59
4	Florida State	69
2	North Carolina	73
3	Duke	74

Championship; Saturday, March 16; ESPN/ACCN
4	Florida State	63
3	Duke	73

=== NCAA tournament ===
The ACC had seven teams selected to the NCAA tournament. This was tied for second overall with the SEC. The ACC's three number one seeded teams ties an all-time record. The previous time one conference had three number one seeds was in 2009, when the Big East accomplished the feat.

Seed	Region	School	1st round	2nd round	Sweet 16	Elite Eight	Final Four	Championship
1	East	Duke	W 85–62 vs. #16 North Dakota State – (Columbia)	W 77–76 vs. #9 UCF – (Columbia)	W 75–73 vs. #4 Virginia Tech – (Washington, D.C.)	L 67–68 vs. #2 Michigan State – (Washington, D.C.)		
1	Midwest	North Carolina	W 88–73 vs. #16 Iona – (Columbus)	W 81–59 vs. #9 Washington – (Columbus)	L 80–97 vs. #5 Auburn – (Kansas City)			
1	South	Virginia	W 71–56 vs. #16 Gardner–Webb – (Columbia)	W 63–51 vs. #9 Oklahoma – (Columbia)	W 53–49 vs. #12 Oregon – (Louisville)	W 80–75 (OT) vs. #3 Purdue – (Louisville)	W 63–62 vs. #5 Auburn – (Minneapolis)	W 85–77 (OT) vs. #3 Texas Tech – (Minneapolis)
4	West	Florida State	W 76–69 vs. #13 Vermont – (Hartford)	W 90–62 vs. #12 Murray State – (Hartford)	L 58–72 vs. #1 Gonzaga – (Anaheim)			
4	East	Virginia Tech	W 66–52 vs. #13 Saint Louis – (San Jose)	W 67–58 vs. #12 Liberty – (San Jose)	L 73–75 vs. #1 Duke – (Washington, D.C.)			
7	East	Louisville	L 76–88 vs. #10 Minnesota – (Des Moines)					
8	West	Syracuse	L 69–78 vs. #9 Baylor – (Salt Lake City)					
		W–L (%):	5–2 (.714)	5–0 (1.000)	2–3 (.400)	1–1 (.500)	1–0 (1.000)	1–0 (1.000) Total: 15–6 (.714)

=== National Invitation tournament ===
Seed	Bracket	School	1st round	2nd round	Quarterfinals	Semifinals	Championship
2	Indiana	Clemson	W 75–69 vs. Wright State – (Clemson)	L 63–55 vs. Wichita State – (Clemson)			
2	UNC-Greensboro	NC State	W 84–78 vs. Hofstra – (Raleigh)	W 78–77 vs. Harvard – (Raleigh)	L 93–94 vs. Lipscomb – (Raleigh)		
		W–L (%):	2–0 (1.000)	1–1 (.500)	0–1 (.000)	0–0 (–)	0–0 (–) Total: 3–2 (.600)

== Honors and awards ==
=== All-Americans ===
Consensus All-Americans
First Team	Second Team
RJ Barrett – Duke Zion Williamson – Duke	None

To earn "consensus" status, a player must win honors based on a point system computed from the four different all-America teams. The point system consists of three points for first team, two points for second team and one point for third team. No honorable mention or fourth team or lower are used in the computation. The top five totals plus ties are first team and the next five plus ties are second team.

Associated Press	NABC	Sporting News	USBWA
First Team
RJ Barrett – Duke; Zion Williamson – Duke	RJ Barrett – Duke; Zion Williamson – Duke	RJ Barrett – Duke; Zion Williamson – Duke	RJ Barrett – Duke; Zion Williamson – Duke
Second Team
None	De'Andre Hunter – Virginia	None	None
Third Team
Kyle Guy – Virginia De'Andre Hunter – Virginia	Kyle Guy – Virginia	Kyle Guy – Virginia De'Andre Hunter – Virginia	De'Andre Hunter – Virginia

=== ACC Awards ===
2019 ACC Men's Basketball Individual Awards
Award	Recipient(s)
Player of the Year	Zion Williamson, F., Duke
Coach of the Year	Tony Bennett, Virginia
Defensive Player of the Year	De'Andre Hunter, F., Virginia
Freshman of the Year	Zion Williamson, F., Duke
Most Improved Player of the Year	Jordan Nwora, F., Louisville
Sixth Man Award	Mfiondu Kabengele F., Florida State

2019 ACC Men's Basketball All-Conference Teams
First Team	Second Team	Third Team
Zion Williamson† – Duke; RJ Barrett – Duke; De'Andre Hunter – Virginia; Cameron Johnson – North Carolina; Kyle Guy – Virginia	Luke Maye – North Carolina; Ky Bowman – Boston College; Ty Jerome – Virginia; Coby White – North Carolina; Kerry Blackshear Jr. – Virginia Tech	Jordan Nwora – Louisville; Marcquise Reed – Clemson; Tyus Battle – Syracuse; Nickeil Alexander-Walker – Virginia Tech; John Mooney – Notre Dame
† - denotes unanimous selection

== NBA draft ==
The Atlantic Coast Conference had a record six players selected in the lottery picks of the NBA Draft. Their ten first round selections tied the record for most first round selections from a conference in a single year. Also, the ACC had the most selections of any conference in the draft (thirteen total). The ACC also became the first conference to have five top-ten picks in the modern draft era (since 1966).

PG	Point guard	SG	Shooting guard	SF	Small forward	PF	Power forward	C	Center

Player	Team	Round	Pick #	Position	School
Zion Williamson	New Orleans Pelicans	1	1	PF	Duke
RJ Barrett	New York Knicks	1	3	SG/SF	Duke
De'Andre Hunter	Atlanta Hawks	1	4	SF	Virginia
Coby White	Chicago Bulls	1	7	PG	North Carolina
Cam Reddish	Atlanta Hawks	1	10	SF	Duke
Cameron Johnson	Phoenix Suns	1	11	SG	North Carolina
Nickeil Alexander-Walker	New Orleans Pelicans	1	17	SG	Virginia Tech
Ty Jerome	Philadelphia 76ers	1	24	PG	Virginia
Nassir Little	Portland Trail Blazers	1	25	SF	North Carolina
Mfiondu Kabengele	Brooklyn Nets	1	27	C	Florida State
Terance Mann	Los Angeles Clippers	2	48	SF	Florida State
Kyle Guy	New York Knicks	2	55	PG	Virginia
Dewan Hernandez	Toronto Raptors	2	59	PF	Miami

== Attendance ==
Team	Arena	Capacity	Game 1	Game 2	Game 3	Game 4	Game 5	Game 6	Game 7	Game 8	Game 9	Game 10	Total	Average	% of Capacity
Team	Arena	Capacity	Game 11	Game 12	Game 13	Game 14	Game 15	Game 16	Game 17	Game 18	Game 19	Game 20	Total	Average	% of Capacity
Boston College	Conte Forum	8,606	3,763	3,974	3,244	4,389	3,410	5,453	3,295	4,664	5,472	5,738	94,377	5,243	60.9%
Boston College	Conte Forum	8,606	5,533	6,862	8,606	3,463	7,251	4,250	7,731	7,279			94,377	5,243	60.9%
Clemson	Littlejohn Coliseum	9,000	7,491	7,208	6,227	6,974	6,254	7,225	6,575	7,879	9,424	6,693	128,306	7,547	83.9%
Clemson	Littlejohn Coliseum	9,000	6,474	7,655	9,000	7,549	7,810	9,248	8,620				128,306	7,547	83.9%
Duke	Cameron Indoor Stadium	9,314	9,314	9,314	9,314	9,314	9,314	9,314	9,314	9,314	9,314	9,314	158,338	9,314	100%
Duke	Cameron Indoor Stadium	9,314	9,314	9,314	9,314	9,314	9,314	9,314	9,314				158,338	9,314	100%
Florida State	Donald L. Tucker Center	12,100	11,103	7,457	9,978	7,838	5,726	6,209	7,237	10,531	11,675	8,502	146,036	9,127	75.4%
Florida State	Donald L. Tucker Center	12,100	10,181	11,675	7,806	9,519	9,988	10,611					146,036	9,127	75.4%
Georgia Tech	McCamish Pavilion	8,600	4,691	4,922	4,175	4,306	4,951	4,268	8,600	5,589	4,397	6,397	107,003	5,945	57.5%
Georgia Tech	McCamish Pavilion	8,600	6,166	8,600	5,861	8,600	5,636	8,600	4,959	6,285			107,003	5,945	57.5%
Louisville	KFC Yum! Center	22,090	15,355	14,939	15,977	15,477	14,920	14,197	15,117	16,249	20,882	15,050	298,826	16,601	75.2%
Louisville	KFC Yum! Center	22,090	14,898	16,322	16,929	19,985	22,046	16,043	17,529	16,911			298,826	16,601	75.2%
Miami	Watsco Center	7,972	6,799	6,066	6,322	6,376	6,553	6,222	6,789	6,983	7,197	7,131	106,136	6,634	83.2%
Miami	Watsco Center	7,972	7,122	6,680	6,372	6,338	6,813	6,373					106,136	6,634	83.2%
North Carolina	Dean Smith Center	21,750	19,647	20,816	20,547	20,083	21,750	21,486	21,329	21,243	20,475	21,148	337,186	21,074	96.9%
North Carolina	Dean Smith Center	21,750	21,124	21,383	21,750	21,520	21,135	21,750					337,186	21,074	96.9%
NC State	PNC Arena	19,722	13,632	13,586	13,620	13,290	13,308	12,828	17,793	14,877	15,098	19,722	283,966	15,776	80.0%
NC State	PNC Arena	19,722	17,695	18,180	18,211	19,500	16,335	14,435	16,053	15,803			283,966	15,776	80.0%
Notre Dame	Edmund P. Joyce Center	9,149	6,462	6,684	5,988	6,511	6,161	6,751	8,053	6,359	6,511	8,086	144,926	7,628	83.4%
Notre Dame	Edmund P. Joyce Center	9,149	8,245	8,442	8,709	9,149	9,149	8,438	8,286	8,784	8,158		144,926	7,628	83.4%
Pittsburgh	Petersen Events Center	12,508	4,729	4,321	3,285	2,578	3,540	3,468	4,472	3,988	6,182	12,508	121,473	6,749	54.0%
Pittsburgh	Petersen Events Center	12,508	6,290	6,780	12,881	12,508	8,950	10,289	6,102	8,602			121,473	6,749	54.0%
Syracuse	Carrier Dome	35,446	19,916	21,012	16,586	21,547	20,416	24,082	17,585	18,620	18,808	21,968	417,856	21,992	62.0%
Syracuse	Carrier Dome	35,446	17,289	19,257	24,466	21,058	21,553	26,011	22,988	35,642	29,052		417,856	21,992	62.0%
Virginia	John Paul Jones Arena	14,593	13,807	13,574	13,971	13,397	13,648	14,623	14,623	14,623	14,623	14,273	225,392	14,087	96.5%
Virginia	John Paul Jones Arena	14,593	13,978	14,629	13,448	14,094	13,452	14,629					225,392	14,087	96.5%
Virginia Tech	Cassell Coliseum	10,052	7,736	7,474	9,275	7,748	5,305	6,681	7,632	8,008	7,009	9,275	122,518	8,168	81.3%
Virginia Tech	Cassell Coliseum	10,052	9,275	9,275	9,275	9,275	9,275	9,275					122,518	8,168	81.3%
Wake Forest	LJVM Coliseum	14,665	5,572	5,109	4,741	5,248	6,149	5,975	4,878	14,268	10,157	9,487	122,014	7,626	52.0%
Wake Forest	LJVM Coliseum	14,665	7,031	5,170	14,352	5,283	9,721	8,873					122,014	7,626	52.0%
