= 2018–19 Louisville Cardinals men's basketball team =

American college basketball season

2018–19 Louisville Cardinals men's basketball

NCAA tournament, First Round
- Conference: Atlantic Coast Conference
- Record: 20–14 (10–8 ACC)
- Head coach: Chris Mack (1st season)
- Assistant coaches: Dino Gaudio; Luke Murray; Mike Pegues
- Home arena: KFC Yum! Center

2018–19 ACC men's basketball standings
	Conf.				Overall
Team	W		L	PCT	W		L	PCT
No. 2 Virginia	16	–	2	.889	35	–	3	.921
No. 3 North Carolina	16	–	2	.889	29	–	7	.806
No. 1 Duke †	14	–	4	.778	32	–	6	.842
No. 10 Florida State	13	–	5	.722	29	–	8	.784
No. 16 Virginia Tech	12	–	6	.667	26	–	9	.743
Syracuse	10	–	8	.556	20	–	14	.588
Louisville	10	–	8	.556	20	–	14	.588
NC State	9	–	9	.500	24	–	12	.667
Clemson	9	–	9	.500	20	–	14	.588
Georgia Tech	6	–	12	.333	14	–	18	.438
Boston College	5	–	13	.278	14	–	17	.452
Miami (FL)	5	–	13	.278	14	–	18	.438
Wake Forest	4	–	14	.222	11	–	20	.355
Pittsburgh	3	–	15	.167	14	–	19	.424
Notre Dame	3	–	15	.167	14	–	19	.424
† 2019 ACC tournament winner Rankings from AP poll

The 2018–19 Louisville Cardinals men's basketball team represented the University of Louisville during the 2018–19 NCAA Division I men's basketball season. The team played its home games on Denny Crum Court at the KFC Yum! Center in downtown Louisville, Kentucky as members of the Atlantic Coast Conference. They were led by first-year head coach Chris Mack who was hired on March 27, 2018, after it was announced interim coach David Padgett would not be retained. They finished the season 20–14, to finish in 7th place. In the ACC Tournament, they beat Notre Dame in the Second Round before losing to North Carolina in the Quarterfinals. They received a at-large bid to the NCAA Tournament and received a 7th seed before losing to 10th seed Minnesota in the First Round.

== Previous season ==
The Cardinals finished the 2017–18 season with a record of 22–14, 9–9 in ACC play, finishing in a tie for 8th with Florida State, who they defeated in the second round of the ACC tournament before losing to Virginia in the quarterfinals. They received an invitation to the NIT, where they defeated Northern Kentucky in the first round and Middle Tennessee in the second round before being defeated in the quarterfinals by Mississippi State.

== Offseason ==
=== Departures ===
Name	Number	Pos.	Height	Weight	Year	Hometown	Reason for departure
Lance Thomas	1	F	6'8"	210	Freshman	Norcross, Georgia	Transferred to Memphis
Quentin Snider	4	G	6'2"	175	Senior	Louisville, Kentucky	Graduated
Ray Spalding	13	F	6'10"	215	Junior	Louisville, Kentucky	Declared for 2018 NBA draft
Anas Mahmoud	14	F	7'0"	215	Senior	Cairo, Egypt	Graduated; declared for 2018 NBA draft
Deng Adel	22	F	6'7"	200	Junior	Melbourne, Australia	Declared for 2018 NBA draft

=== Incoming transfers ===
Name	Number	Pos.	Height	Weight	Year	Hometown	Previous School
Akoy Agau	0	F	6'8"	240	Graduate Student	South Sudan	SMU
Christen Cunningham	1	G	6'2"	190	Graduate Student	Georgetown, KY	Samford University
Khwan Fore	4	G	6'0"	185	Graduate Student	Huntsville, AL	Richmond

=== 2018 recruiting class ===
No recruits.

== Roster ==
2018–19 Louisville Cardinals men's basketball team
Players
Coaches

Pos.	#	Name	Height	Weight	Year	Previous school	Hometown
F	0	Akoy Agau	6 ft 8 in (2.03 m)	240 lb (109 kg)	GS	SMU; Omaha Central	South Sudan
G	1	Christen Cunningham	6 ft 2 in (1.88 m)	190 lb (86 kg)	GS	Samford; Henry Clay	Georgetown, Kentucky
G	2	Darius Perry	6 ft 2 in (1.88 m)	195 lb (88 kg)	So	Wheeler	Marietta, Georgia
G	3	Jo Griffin (W)	6 ft 1 in (1.85 m)	200 lb (91 kg)	So	South Oldham	LaGrange, Kentucky
G	4	Khwan Fore	6 ft 0 in (1.83 m)	185 lb (84 kg)	GS	Richmond; Lee High	Huntsville, Alabama
F/C	5	Malik Williams	6 ft 11 in (2.11 m)	245 lb (111 kg)	So	Snider	Fort Wayne, Indiana
G/F	10	Wyatt Battaile (W)	6 ft 4 in (1.93 m)	195 lb (88 kg)	Fr	Pikeville	Pikeville, Kentucky
G	12	Jacob Redding (W)	6 ft 0 in (1.83 m)	180 lb (82 kg)	So	Carroll	Fort Wayne, Indiana
G/F	13	V. J. King	6 ft 6 in (1.98 m)	215 lb (98 kg)	Jr	Paul VI	Cleveland, Ohio
C	23	Steven Enoch	6 ft 10 in (2.08 m)	260 lb (118 kg)	RS Jr	Connecticut; St. Thomas More	Norwalk, Connecticut
F	24	Dwayne Sutton	6 ft 5 in (1.96 m)	215 lb (98 kg)	RS Jr	UNC Asheville duPont Manual	Louisville, Kentucky
G	30	Ryan McMahon	6 ft 0 in (1.83 m)	180 lb (82 kg)	RS Jr	Cardinal Mooney	Sarasota, Florida
F	33	Jordan Nwora	6 ft 7 in (2.01 m)	225 lb (102 kg)	So	Vermont Academy	Buffalo, New York

Head coach

- Chris Mack (Xavier)

Assistant coach(es)

- Dino Gaudio (Ohio)
- Luke Murray (Fairfield)
- Mike Pegues (Delaware)

Legend

- (C) Team captain
- (S) Suspended
- (I) Ineligible
- (W) Walk-on
- Injured
- Current redshirt

Roster

== Schedule and results ==
Date time, TV	Rank^{#}	Opponent^{#}	Result	Record	High points	High rebounds	High assists	Site (attendance) city, state
Exhibition
October 28, 2018*; 2:00 pm, ACCN Extra		Bellarmine	W 71–60	–	17 – King	9 – Nwora	5 – Perry	KFC Yum! Center (14,377); Louisville, KY
November 3, 2018*; 7:00 pm, ACCN Extra		Simmons (KY)	W 90–41	–	16 – Enoch	8 – Williams	4 – Tied	KFC Yum! Center (14,588); Louisville, KY
Non-conference regular season
November 8, 2018*; 7:00 pm, ACCN Extra		Nicholls State	W 85–72	1–0	15 – Enoch	8 – Enoch	2 – Sutton	KFC Yum! Center (15,355); Louisville, KY
November 13, 2018*; 7:00 pm, ACCN Extra		Southern; NIT Season Tip-Off campus-site game	W 104–54	2–0	20 – Nwora	7 – Tied	6 – McMahon	KFC Yum! Center (14,939); Louisville, KY
November 16, 2018*; 7:00 pm, ACCN Extra		Vermont; NIT Season Tip-Off campus-site game	W 86–78	3–0	22 – Nwora	5 – Nwora	4 – Perry	KFC Yum! Center (15,977); Louisville, KY
November 21, 2018*; 5:00 pm, ESPN2		vs. No. 5 Tennessee; NIT Season Tip-Off semifinals	L 81–92	3–1	23 – Nwora	10 – Nwora	8 – Perry	Barclays Center (4,981); Brooklyn, NY
November 23, 2018*; 7:00 pm, ESPN2		vs. Marquette; NIT Season Tip-Off	L 74–77 ^{OT}	3–2	16 – Cunningham	7 – Tied	3 – Tied	Barclays Center; Brooklyn, NY
November 27, 2018*; 7:30 pm, ESPN		No. 9 Michigan State; ACC–Big Ten Challenge	W 82–78 ^{OT}	4–2	24 – McMahon	9 – Nwora	5 – Cunningham	KFC Yum! Center (15,477); Louisville, KY
December 1, 2018*; 12:00 pm, FOX		at Seton Hall	W 70–65	5–2	12 – Sutton	9 – Sutton	3 – Cunningham	Prudential Center (8,505); Newark, NJ
December 5, 2018*; 7:00 pm, ACCN Extra		Central Arkansas	W 86–41	6–2	21 – Nwora	9 – Enoch	5 – Cunningham	KFC Yum! Center (14,920); Louisville, KY
December 8, 2018*; 2:30 pm, FOX		at Indiana	L 67–68	6–3	24 – Nwora	14 – Nwora	3 – Cunningham	Simon Skjodt Assembly Hall (17,222); Bloomington, IN
December 12, 2018*; 7:00 pm, ACCRSN		Lipscomb	W 72–68	7–3	22 – Nwora	13 – Williams	3 – Enoch	KFC Yum! Center (14,197); Louisville, KY
December 15, 2018*; 4:00 pm, ACCRSN		Kent State	W 83–70	8–3	17 – Cunningham	10 – Nwora	4 – Cunningham	KFC Yum! Center (15,117); Louisville, KY
December 21, 2018*; 7:00 pm, ACCN Extra		Robert Morris	W 74–59	9–3	19 – Nwora	13 – Nwora	4 – McMahon	KFC Yum! Center (16,249); Louisville, KY
December 29, 2018*; 2:00 pm, ESPN2		No. 16 Kentucky; Battle for the Bluegrass	L 58–71	9–4	20 – Cunningham	9 – Enoch	4 – Cunningham	KFC Yum! Center (20,882); Louisville, KY
ACC Regular Season
January 6, 2019; 6:00 pm, ESPNU		Miami (FL)	W 90–73	10–4 (1–0)	20 – Nwora	11 – Williams	9 – McMahon	KFC Yum! Center (15,050); Louisville, KY
January 9, 2019; 8:00 pm, Raycom		at Pittsburgh	L 86–89 ^{OT}	10–5 (1–1)	23 – Cunningham	11 – Sutton	5 – Cunningham	Petersen Events Center (6,290); Pittsburgh, PA
January 12, 2019; 12:00 pm, ESPN		at No. 12 North Carolina	W 83–62	11–5 (2–1)	17 – Enoch	11 – Enoch	7 – Sutton	Dean Smith Center (21,243); Chapel Hill, NC
January 16, 2019; 7:00 pm, ACCRSN		Boston College	W 80–70	12–5 (3–1)	32 – Nwora	10 – Nwora	8 – Cunningham	KFC Yum! Center (14,898); Louisville, KY
January 19, 2019; 4:00 pm, Raycom		at Georgia Tech	W 79–51	13–5 (4–1)	25 – Nwora	8 – Nwora	11 – Cunningham	McCamish Pavilion (8,600); Atlanta, GA
January 24, 2019; 8:00 pm, Raycom	No. 23	No. 21 NC State	W 84–77	14–5 (5–1)	17 – Cunningham	6 – Nwora	4 – Cunningham	KFC Yum! Center (16,322); Louisville, KY
January 26, 2019; 2:00 pm, Raycom	No. 23	Pittsburgh	W 66–51	15–5 (6–1)	17 – Nwora	11 – Enoch	7 – Cunningham	KFC Yum! Center (16,929); Louisville, KY
January 30, 2019; 8:00 pm, Raycom	No. 15	at Wake Forest	W 82–54	16–5 (7–1)	20 – Nwora	10 – Sutton	4 – Sutton	LJVM Coliseum (7,031); Winston-Salem, NC
February 2, 2019; 2:00 pm, ESPN	No. 15	No. 9 North Carolina	L 69–79	16–6 (7–2)	19 – Sutton	8 – Sutton	9 – Cunningham	KFC Yum! Center (19,985); Louisville, KY
February 4, 2019; 7:00 pm, ESPN	No. 16	at No. 11 Virginia Tech	W 72–64	17–6 (8–2)	17 – Tied	9 – Sutton	6 – Cunningham	Cassell Coliseum (9,275); Blacksburg, VA
February 9, 2019; 4:00 pm, ESPN2	No. 16	at No. 22 Florida State	L 75–80 ^{OT}	17–7 (8–3)	20 – Cunningham	7 – Williams	6 – Cunningham	Donald L. Tucker Civic Center (11,675); Tallahassee, FL
February 12, 2019; 9:00 pm, ESPN	No. 16	No. 2 Duke	L 69–71	17–8 (8–4)	23 – Nwora	12 – Nwora	12 – Cunningham	KFC Yum! Center (22,046); Louisville, KY
February 16, 2019; 12:00 pm, ESPN	No. 16	Clemson	W 56–55	18–8 (9–4)	18 – Cunningham	7 – Williams	5 – Cunningham	KFC Yum! Center (16,043); Louisville, KY
February 20, 2019; 7:00 pm, ESPN	No. 18	at Syracuse	L 49–69	18–9 (9–5)	11 – Nwora	8 – Sutton	3 – Cunningham	Carrier Dome (22,988); Syracuse, NY
February 23, 2019; 12:00 pm, Raycom	No. 18	No. 3 Virginia	L 52–64	18–10 (9–6)	17 – Nwora	11 – Sutton	6 – Cunningham	KFC Yum! Center (17,529); Louisville, KY
February 27, 2019; 9:00 pm, ACCRSN		at Boston College	L 59–66	18–11 (9–7)	22 – Enoch	12 – Nwora	6 – Cunningham	Conte Forum (4,250); Chestnut Hill, MA.
March 3, 2019; 1:30 pm, CBS		Notre Dame	W 75–61	19–11 (10–7)	20 – Nwora	13 – Williams	4 – Cunningham	KFC Yum! Center (16,911); Louisville, KY
March 9, 2019; 4:00 pm, ESPN		at No. 2 Virginia	L 68–73	19–12 (10–8)	19 – Nwora	11 – Enoch	3 – Fore	John Paul Jones Arena (14,629); Charlottesville, VA
ACC Tournament
March 13, 2019; 7:00 pm, ESPN2	(7)	vs. (15) Notre Dame; Second Round	W 75–53	20–12	24 – Nwora	10 – Sutton	5 – McMahon	Spectrum Center (11,884); Charlotte, NC
March 14, 2019; 7:00 pm, ESPN	(7)	vs. (2) No. 3 North Carolina; Quarterfinals	L 70–83	20–13	14 – Sutton	13 – Williams	7 – Cunningham	Spectrum Center (19,691); Charlotte, NC
NCAA tournament
March 21, 2019; 12:15 pm, CBS	(7 E)	vs. (10 E) Minnesota; First Round	L 76–86	20–14	22 – Cunningham	11 – Nwora	4 – Tied	Wells Fargo Arena (16,512); Des Moines, IA
*Non-conference game. ^{#}Rankings from AP Poll. (#) Tournament seedings in parentheses. E=East. All times are in Eastern Time.

== Rankings ==
Ranking movements Legend: ██ Increase in ranking ██ Decrease in ranking — = Not ranked RV = Received votes
	Week																			
Poll	Pre	1	2	3	4	5	6	7	8	9	10	11	12	13	14	15	16	17	18	Final
AP	RV	RV	RV	—	—	RV	—	RV	RV	RV	RV	RV	23	15	16	16	18	RV		Not released
Coaches	RV	RV	—	RV	—	—	—	RV	RV	—	—	RV	24	16	17	20	22	24	RV	RV

*AP does not release post-NCAA Tournament rankings
