= 2018–19 Florida State Seminoles men's basketball team =

American college basketball season

2018–19 Florida State Seminoles men's basketball

NCAA tournament, Sweet Sixteen
- Conference: Atlantic Coast Conference

Ranking
- Coaches: No. 13
- AP: No. 10
- Record: 29–8 (13–5 ACC)
- Head coach: Leonard Hamilton (17th season)
- Assistant coaches: Stan Jones; Charlton Young; Dennis Gates
- Home arena: Donald L. Tucker Center (Capacity: 11,675)

2018–19 ACC men's basketball standings
	Conf.				Overall
Team	W		L	PCT	W		L	PCT
No. 2 Virginia	16	–	2	.889	35	–	3	.921
No. 3 North Carolina	16	–	2	.889	29	–	7	.806
No. 1 Duke †	14	–	4	.778	32	–	6	.842
No. 10 Florida State	13	–	5	.722	29	–	8	.784
No. 16 Virginia Tech	12	–	6	.667	26	–	9	.743
Syracuse	10	–	8	.556	20	–	14	.588
Louisville	10	–	8	.556	20	–	14	.588
NC State	9	–	9	.500	24	–	12	.667
Clemson	9	–	9	.500	20	–	14	.588
Georgia Tech	6	–	12	.333	14	–	18	.438
Boston College	5	–	13	.278	14	–	17	.452
Miami (FL)	5	–	13	.278	14	–	18	.438
Wake Forest	4	–	14	.222	11	–	20	.355
Pittsburgh	3	–	15	.167	14	–	19	.424
Notre Dame	3	–	15	.167	14	–	19	.424
† 2019 ACC tournament winner Rankings from AP poll

The 2018–19 Florida State Seminoles men's basketball team represented Florida State University during the 2018–19 NCAA Division I men's basketball season. The Seminoles were led by head coach Leonard Hamilton, in his 17th year, and played their home games at the Donald L. Tucker Center on the university's Tallahassee, Florida campus as members of the Atlantic Coast Conference.

The Seminoles finished the season with a school record twenty-nine wins as well as a school record thirteen ACC wins, finishing in fourth place. Florida State reached the finals of the ACC tournament, finishing as runner-up; they received an at-large bid to the NCAA tournament as a four seed, advancing to the Sweet Sixteen for the second consecutive year and the sixth time in program history. They ended up losing to Gonzaga. The senior class, including Terrance Mann, Christ Koumadje, P.J. Savoy, and Phil Cofer, also became the winningest class in school history.

== Previous season ==
The Seminoles finished the 2017–18 season with a record of 23–12, 9–9 in ACC play, to finish in a tie for eighth place. The Seminoles lost in the second round of the ACC tournament to Louisville. They received an at-large bid to the NCAA tournament where they defeated Missouri, Xavier, and Gonzaga to advance to the Elite Eight for the first time since 1993, where they lost to Michigan.

== Offseason ==
=== Departures ===
Name	Number	Pos.	Height	Weight	Year	Hometown	Reason for departure
CJ Walker	2	G	6'1"	195	Sophomore	Indianapolis, IN	Transferred to Ohio State
Braian Angola	11	G	6'6"	195	Senior	Villanueva, Colombia	Graduated
Ike Obiagu	12	C	7'0"	240	Freshman	Anuja, Nigeria	Transferred to Seton Hall
Brandon Allen	40	F	6'6"	209	RS Senior	Milton, FL	Graduated

=== Incoming transfers ===
Name	Number	Pos.	Height	Weight	Year	Hometown	Previous School
Malik Osbourne	10	F	6'8"	200	Sophomore	Matteson, IL	Rice
David Nichols	11	G	6'0"	190	Senior	South Holland, IL	Albany

- Under NCAA transfer rules, Osbourne will have to sit out for the 2018–19 season, and will have three years of remaining eligibility.

=== 2018 recruiting class ===
College recruiting information
Name	Hometown	School	Height	Weight	Commit date
Devin Vassell; SG	Suwanee, GA	Peachtree Ridge High School	6 ft 5 in (1.96 m)	170 lb (77 kg)	May 2, 2017
Devin Vassell; SG	Recruit ratings: Scout: Rivals: 247Sports: ESPN:				
Overall recruit ranking: Scout: N/A Rivals: N/A ESPN: N/A
Note: In many cases, Scout, Rivals, 247Sports, On3, and ESPN may conflict in their listings of height and weight.; In these cases, the average was taken. ESPN grades are on a 100-point scale.; Sources: "2018 Team Ranking". Rivals.

== Roster ==
2018–19 Florida State Seminoles men's basketball team
Players
Coaches

Pos.	#	Name	Height	Weight	Year	Previous school	Hometown
F	0	Phil Cofer	6 ft 8 in (2.03 m)	230 lb (104 kg)	RS Sr	Whitewater	Atlanta, GA
F	1	RaiQuan Gray	6 ft 8 in (2.03 m)	260 lb (118 kg)	RS Fr	Dillard	Fort Lauderdale, FL
G	3	Trent Forrest	6 ft 4 in (1.93 m)	210 lb (95 kg)	Jr	Chipley	Chipley, FL
G	4	Ty Hands (W)	6 ft 5 in (1.96 m)	180 lb (82 kg)	Fr	Palm Beach Lakes	West Palm Beach, FL
G	5	P. J. Savoy	6 ft 4 in (1.93 m)	210 lb (95 kg)	Sr	Las Vegas/Sheridan	Las Vegas, NV
F	10	Malik Osbourne (redshirt)	6 ft 9 in (2.06 m)	215 lb (98 kg)	So	Don Bosco Prep/Rice	Matteson, IL
G	11	David Nichols	6 ft 0 in (1.83 m)	185 lb (84 kg)	Sr	Mount Carmel/Albany	South Holland, IL
G	13	Anthony Polite	6 ft 6 in (1.98 m)	215 lb (98 kg)	RS Fr	St. Andrew's Christian	Lugano, Switzerland
G	14	Terance Mann	6 ft 7 in (2.01 m)	215 lb (98 kg)	Sr	Tilton School	Lowell, MA
G	15	Justin Lindner	6 ft 1 in (1.85 m)	180 lb (82 kg)	Jr	Christian Brothers	Memphis, TN
G	20	Travis Light (W)	6 ft 5 in (1.96 m)	175 lb (79 kg)	RS So	Montverde Academy	Vienna, VA
C	21	Christ Koumadje	7 ft 4 in (2.24 m)	268 lb (122 kg)	Sr	Montverde Academy	N'Djamena, Chad
G	23	M. J. Walker	6 ft 5 in (1.96 m)	213 lb (97 kg)	So	Jonesboro	Jonesboro, GA
G/F	24	Devin Vassell	6 ft 5 in (1.96 m)	170 lb (77 kg)	Fr	Peachtree Ridge	Suwanee, GA
F	25	Mfiondu Kabengele	6 ft 10 in (2.08 m)	250 lb (113 kg)	RS So	Don Bosco Prep	Burlington, ON
F	31	Wyatt Wilkes	6 ft 8 in (2.03 m)	220 lb (100 kg)	RS Fr	Winter Park	Orlando, FL
F	33	Will Miles (W)	6 ft 6 in (1.98 m)	220 lb (100 kg)	RS So	Trinity Prep	Orlando, FL
F	35	Harrison Prieto (W)	6 ft 8 in (2.03 m)	230 lb (104 kg)	RS So	St. Paul's School	Mandeville, FL

Head coach

- Leonard Hamilton (UT Martin)

Assistant coach(es)

- Stan Jones (Memphis)
- Dennis Gates (California)
- Charlton Young (Georgia Southern)

Legend

- (C) Team captain
- (S) Suspended
- (I) Ineligible
- (W) Walk-on
- Injured
- Current redshirt

Roster

== Schedule ==
Date time, TV	Rank^{#}	Opponent^{#}	Result	Record	High points	High rebounds	High assists	Site (attendance) city, state
Exhibition
October 26, 2018*; 6:00 pm	No. 17	West Georgia	W 96–56	-	20 – Koumadje	8 – Koumadje	4 – Wilkes	Donald L. Tucker Center; Tallahassee, FL
November 1, 2018*; 7:00 pm	No. 17	Valdosta State	W 99–77	-	15 – Forrest	6 – Forrest	5 – Tied	Donald L. Tucker Center; Tallahassee, FL
Non-conference regular season
November 6, 2018*; 9:00 pm, ESPN2	No. 17	Florida; Rivalry	W 81–60	1–0	20 – Savoy	9 – Mann	5 – Forrest	Donald L. Tucker Center (11,103); Tallahassee, FL
November 11, 2018*; 7:00 pm, ESPN3	No. 17	at Tulane	W 80–69	2–0	21 – Mann	10 – Mann	5 – Forrest	Devlin Fieldhouse (2,351); New Orleans, LA
November 19, 2018*; 7:00 pm, ACCN Extra	No. 14	Canisius; AdvoCare Invitational campus game	W 93–61	3–0	18 – Kabengele	9 – Koumadje	6 – Forrrst	Donald L. Tucker Center (7,457); Tallahassee, FL
November 22, 2018*; 9:30 pm, ESPN2	No. 14	vs. UAB; AdvoCare Invitational quarterfinal	W 81–63	4–0	17 – Mann	11 – Forrest	3 – Tied	HP Field House; Lake Buena Vista, FL
November 23, 2018*; 4:30 pm, ESPN2	No. 14	vs. No. 19 LSU; AdvoCare Invitational semifinal	W 79–76 ^{OT}	5–0	21 – Walker	12 – Mann	5 – Forrest	HP Field House; Lake Buena Vista, FL
November 25, 2018*; 1:00 pm, ESPN	No. 14	vs. Villanova; AdvoCare Invitational final	L 60–66	5–1	11 – Tied	7 – Kabengele	2 – Tied	HP Field House; Lake Buena Vista, FL
November 28, 2018*; 9:00 pm, ESPN2	No. 15	No. 19 Purdue; ACC–Big Ten Challenge	W 73–72	6–1	13 – Walker	8 – Mann	3 – Tied	Donald L. Tucker Center (9,978); Tallahassee, FL
December 3, 2018*; 8:00 pm, ACCRSN	No. 11	Troy	W 83–67	7–1	16 – Savoy	8 – Mann	3 – Tied	Donald L. Tucker Center (7,838); Tallahassee, FL
December 8, 2018*; 6:30 pm, ESPN2	No. 11	vs. UConn; Never Forget Tribute Classic	W 79–71	8–1	20 – Mann	11 – Koumadje	2 – Nichols	Prudential Center (18,711); Newark, NJ
December 17, 2018*; 7:00 pm, ACCN Extra	No. 11	Southeast Missouri State	W 85–68	9–1	23 – Forrest	8 – Forrest	4 – Forrest	Donald L. Tucker Center (5,726); Tallahassee, FL
December 19, 2018*; 7:00 pm, ACCN Extra	No. 11	North Florida	W 95–81	10–1	24 – Kabengele	7 – Kabengele	7 – Forrest	Donald L. Tucker Center (6,209); Tallahassee, FL
December 22, 2018*; 2:30 pm, FSS/FS2	No. 11	vs. Saint Louis; Orange Bowl Basketball Classic	W 81–59	11–1	19 – Nichols	7 – Tied	5 – Forrest	BB&T Center; Sunrise, FL
January 1, 2019*; 2:00 pm, ACCN Extra	No. 9	Winthrop	W 87–76	12–1	22 – Mann	8 – Koumadje	3 – Cofer	Donald L. Tucker Center (7,237); Tallahassee, FL
ACC regular season
January 5, 2019; 3:00 pm, ESPN2	No. 9	at No. 4 Virginia	L 52–65	12–2 (0–1)	9 – Cofer	7 – Kabengele	2 – Tied	John Paul Jones Arena (14,623); Charlottesville, VA
January 9, 2019; 9:00 pm, ACCRSN	No. 13	Miami (FL)	W 68–62	13–2 (1–1)	13 – Nichols	7 – Tied	3 – Tied	Donald L. Tucker Center (10,531); Tallahassee, FL
January 12, 2019; 2:00 pm, ESPN	No. 13	No. 1 Duke	L 78–80	13–3 (1–2)	24 – Kabengele	10 – Kabengele	6 – Forrest	Donald L. Tucker Center (11,675); Tallahassee, FL
January 14, 2019; 7:00 pm, ESPNU	No. 11	at Pittsburgh	L 62–75	13–4 (1–3)	19 – Forrest	11 – Koumadje	3 – Forrest	Petersen Events Center (6,780); Pittsburgh, PA
January 20, 2019; 12:00 pm, ESPNU	No. 11	at Boston College	L 82–87	13–5 (1–4)	26 – Kabengele	9 – Kabengele	6 – Forrest	Conte Forum (5,533); Chestnut Hill, MA
January 22, 2019; 7:00 pm, ESPNU		Clemson	W 77–68	14–5 (2–4)	17 – Kabengele	8 – Mann	5 – Mann	Donald L. Tucker Center (8,502); Tallahassee, FL
January 27, 2019; 6:00 pm, ESPNU		at Miami (FL)	W 78–66	15–5 (3–4)	22 – Walker	10 – Mann	6 – Forrest	Watsco Center (7,122); Coral Gables, FL
February 2, 2019; 12:00 pm, ACCRSN	No. 25	Georgia Tech	W 59–49	16–5 (4–4)	12 – Tied	8 – Koumadje	3 – Tied	Donald L. Tucker Center (10,181); Tallahassee, FL
February 5, 2019; 8:00 pm, Raycom	No. 22	at Syracuse	W 80–62	17–5 (5–4)	22 – Mann	9 – Mann	10 – Forrest	Carrier Dome (21,553); Syracuse, NY
February 9, 2019; 4:00 pm, ESPN2	No. 22	No. 16 Louisville	W 80–75 ^{OT}	18–5 (6–4)	22 – Kabengele	7 – Kebengele	4 – Forrest	Donald L. Tucker Center (11,675); Tallahassee, FL
February 13, 2019; 7:00 pm, ACCRSN	No. 17	Wake Forest	W 88–66	19–5 (7–4)	20 – Koumadje	12 – Koumadje	6 – Mann	Donald L. Tucker Center (7,806); Tallahassee, FL
February 16, 2019; 2:00 pm, Raycom	No. 17	at Georgia Tech	W 69–47	20–5 (8–4)	11 – Vassell	12 – Koumadje	3 – Forrest	McCamish Pavilion (8,600); Atlanta, GA
February 19, 2019; 9:00 pm, ESPNU	No. 16	at Clemson	W 77–64	21–5 (9–4)	19 – Kabengele	11 – Kabengele	4 – Mann	Littlejohn Coliseum (7,549); Clemson, SC
February 23, 2019; 3:45 pm, CBS	No. 16	at No. 8 North Carolina	L 59–77	21–6 (9–5)	16 – Nichols	6 – Kabengele	10 – Mann	Dean Smith Center (21,520); Chapel Hill, NC
February 25, 2019; 7:00 pm, ESPN	No. 18	Notre Dame	W 68–61	22–6 (10–5)	13 – Vassell	7 – Vassell	4 – Forrest	Donald L. Tucker Center (9,519); Tallahassee, FL
March 2, 2019; 12:00 pm, ESPN2	No. 18	NC State	W 78–73	23–6 (11–5)	16 – Kabengale	6 – Forrest	3 – Forrest	Donald L. Tucker Center (9,988); Tallahassee, FL
March 5, 2019; 7:00 pm, ESPNU	No. 14	No. 15 Virginia Tech	W 73–64 ^{OT}	24–6 (12–5)	17 – Kabengele	9 – Kabengele	4 – Tied	Donald L. Tucker Center (10,611); Tallahassee, FL
March 9, 2019; 12:00 pm, Raycom	No. 14	at Wake Forest	W 65–57	25–6 (13–5)	11 – Forrest	10 – Koumadje	5 – Forrest	LJVM Coliseum (8,873); Winston-Salem, NC
ACC Tournament
March 14, 2019; 3:00 pm, ESPN	(4) No. 12	vs. (5) No. 16 Virginia Tech; Quarterfinals	W 65–63 ^{OT}	26–6	14 – Vassell	9 – Mann	4 – Tied	Spectrum Center (19,691); Charlotte, NC
March 15, 2019; 7:00 pm, ESPN	(4) No. 12	vs. (1) No. 2 Virginia; Semifinals	W 69–59	27–6	14 – Nichols	9 – Koumadje	3 – Tied	Spectrum Center (20,116); Charlotte, NC
March 16, 2019; 8:30 pm, ESPN	(4) No. 12	vs. (3) No. 5 Duke; Championship	L 63–73	27–7	14 – Kabengele	8 – Mann	3 – Forrest	Spectrum Center (19,691); Charlotte, NC
NCAA tournament
March 21, 2019*; 2:00 pm, TBS	(4 W) No. 10	vs. (13 W) Vermont; First Round	W 76–69	28–7	21 – Kabengele	10 – Kabengele	2 – Walker	XL Center (14,838); Hartford, CT
March 23, 2019*; 6:10 pm, TNT	(4 W) No. 10	vs. (12 W) Murray State; Second Round	W 90–62	29–7	22 – Kabengele	9 – Koumadje	6 – Mann	XL Center (15,031); Hartford, CT
March 28, 2019*; 7:09 pm, CBS	(4 W) No. 10	vs. (1 W) No. 4 Gonzaga; Sweet Sixteen	L 58–72	29–8	20 – Forrest	7 – Tied	4 – Forrest	Honda Center (16,145); Anaheim, CA
*Non-conference game. ^{#}Rankings from AP Poll. (#) Tournament seedings in parentheses. W=West. All times are in Eastern Time.

== Awards ==
- ACC Sixth Man of the Year

Mfiondu Kabengele

- All-ACC
  - Honorable Mention

Mfiondu Kabengele
Terrance Mann

== Rankings ==
Ranking movements Legend: ██ Increase in ranking ██ Decrease in ranking RV = Received votes
	Week																				
Poll	Pre	1	2	3	4	5	6	7	8	9	10	11	12	13	14	15	16	17	18	19	Final
AP	17	14	14	15	11	10	11	9	9	13	11	RV	25	22	17	16	18	14	12	10	Not released
Coaches	15	15^	13	14	11	10	12	9	9	13	11	23	RV	24	19	17	17	13	13	11	13

*AP does not release post-NCAA Tournament rankings
^Coaches did not release a Week 2 poll.
