= Ky Bowman =

American basketball player (born 1997)

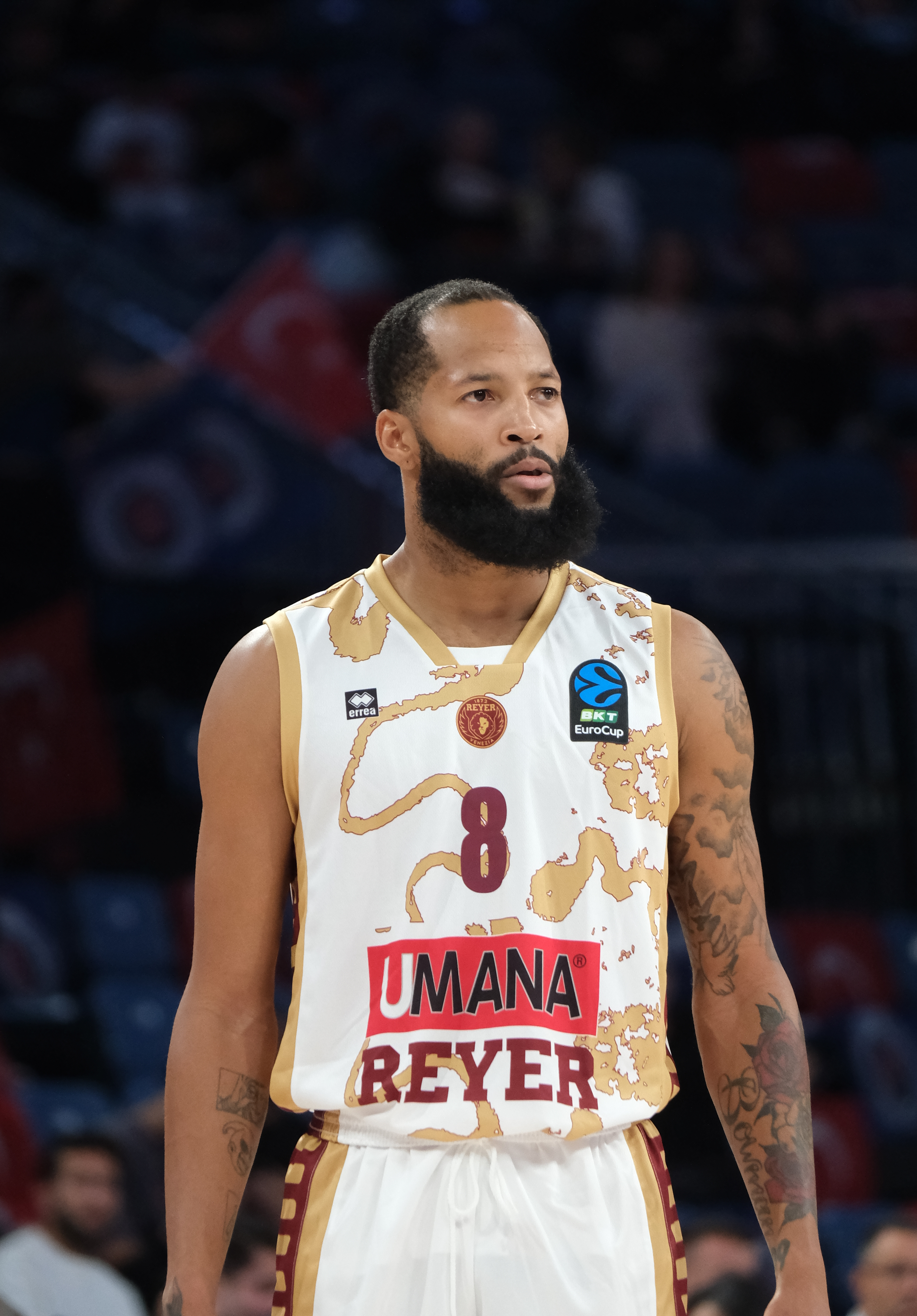
- Bowman with Reyer Venezia in 2025

No. 8 – Umana Reyer Venezia
- Position: Point guard
- League: LBA; EuroCup

Personal information
- Born: June 16, 1997 (age 29) Havelock, North Carolina, U.S.
- Listed height: 6 ft 1 in (1.85 m)
- Listed weight: 187 lb (85 kg)

Career information
- High school: Havelock (Havelock, North Carolina)
- College: Boston College (2016–2019)
- NBA draft: 2019: undrafted
- Playing career: 2019–present

Career history
- 2019–2020: Golden State Warriors
- 2019–2020: →Santa Cruz Warriors
- 2021: Agua Caliente Clippers
- 2022: Austin Spurs
- 2022–2023: New Basket Brindisi
- 2023–2025: Treviso Basket
- 2025–present: Umana Reyer Venezia

Career highlights
- LBA steals leader (2023); Second-team All-ACC (2019); ACC All-Freshman team (2017)
- Stats at NBA.com
- Stats at Basketball Reference

Kyran Azende Bowman (born June 16, 1997) is an American professional basketball player for Reyer Venezia of the Italian Lega Basket Serie A (LBA) and the EuroCup. He played college basketball for the Boston College Eagles.

== Early life ==
Bowman grew up in Havelock, North Carolina, and was a two-sport star in basketball and football at Havelock High School. He was rated a three star recruit as a wide receiver and initially committed to play football at North Carolina as a sophomore over offers from major football programs, including Alabama, before ultimately de-committing in order to pursue basketball despite only having one scholarship offer from a Division I school at the time (East Carolina). As a senior, Bowman averaged 23.4 points, 8.7 rebounds and 4.7 assists for the Rams and was an All-State selection as well as the Area Player of the Year by the New Bern Sun Journal. Over the course of his high school basketball career, Bowman scored 1,813 total points with 652 rebounds and 338 assists and averaged 19.3 points per game, although over his final three seasons he averaged 24.1 points per game. Bowman originally tried to commit to play basketball at East Carolina, but was never contacted back by the team's coaches. Bowman eventually committed to play basketball at Boston College over offers from California, Cincinnati, and Memphis.

== College career ==
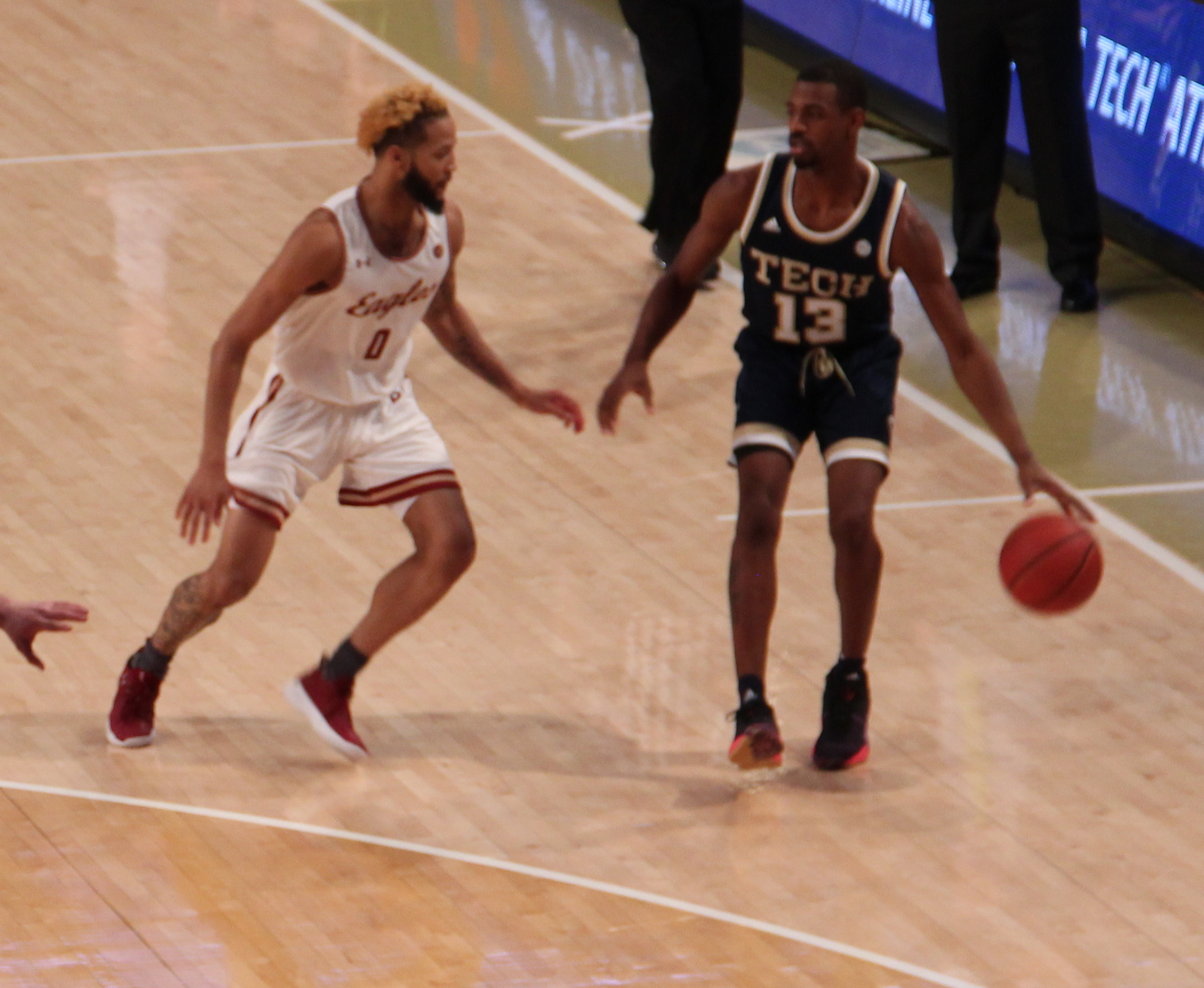
Bowman (left) in March 2019

Bowman was recruited by Boston College assistant coach Scott Spinelli. Bowman played three years for the Boston College Eagles, all as a starter. In his freshman season, Bowman averaged 14.5 points, 2.9 assists and 5.0 rebounds per game and was named to the Atlantic Coast Conference (ACC) All-Freshman team. He was one of five freshman in the nation to have at least three 30-point games. Bowman's season ended after being injured in the first round of the 2017 ACC tournament against Wake Forest.

As a sophomore Bowman averaged a 17.6 points (2nd highest of the team), 6.8 rebounds (3rd), along with a team-leading 4.7 assists and 1.5 steals per game and was named honorable mention All-ACC. Bowman initially declared himself eligible for the 2018 NBA draft, but did not hire an agent and ultimately decided to return to Boston College for his junior season.

Bowman entered his junior season as the ACC's highest returning scorer from the previous season and was named to the 2019 Bob Cousy Award watchlist. Bowman averaged 19.0 points, 7.5 rebounds, and 4.0 assists per game, all of which were ranked in the top ten in the ACC, as well as an NCAA-best 39.4 minutes per game and was named second team All-ACC. He also posted the three highest scoring performances in the ACC during the 2018–19 season with 44 against Hartford, 38 vs. Wyoming and 37 against Florida State. Bowman announced on April 2, 2019, that he had declared for the 2019 NBA draft and intended on hiring an agent, forgoing his final year of eligibility. Bowman finished his collegiate career with 1,661 points scored, 627 rebounds, and 382 assists in 98 games.

== Professional career ==
=== Golden State Warriors (2019–2020) ===
Bowman received an invitation to participate in the NBA draft Combine but ultimately went unselected in the Draft, reportedly due to his reluctance to sign a two-way contract and a desire to evaluate his options as an undrafted free agent. He signed a one-year contract with the Golden State Warriors the following day on June 21, 2019, to join their Summer League team and averaged 3.3 points, 1.9 assists and 1.7 rebounds in seven Summer League games. Bowman officially signed a two-way contract with the Warriors on July 31. Bowman made his NBA debut on October 24, against the Los Angeles Clippers, playing four minutes off the bench and recording an assist in a 141–122 loss. Bowman made his first career start on November 2, against the Charlotte Hornets, scoring 16 points with seven rebounds, four assists and two steals in a 93–87 loss. Two days later on November 4, Bowman scored his career high 19 points with eight assists and four rebounds in a 127–118 win over the Portland Trail Blazers. On November 25, Bowman scored another career high 24 points with five assists, three rebounds, three steals and a block in a 97–100 loss to the Oklahoma City Thunder. In his G League debut on December 14, he had 27 points, 10 assists and eight rebounds against the Agua Caliente Clippers. The Warriors converted Bowman's two-way contract to a multiyear NBA contract on February 7, 2020. He averaged 7.4 points, 2.9 assists and 2.7 rebounds per game in 45 games with 12 starts during his rookie season. Bowman was waived by the Warriors on November 20.

=== Agua Caliente Clippers (2021) ===
On December 1, 2020, Bowman signed with the Los Angeles Clippers. He was waived on December 14 and was included in the roster of the Agua Caliente Clippers on February 4, 2021. Bowman had a season-ending injury and was released on February 25.

=== Austin Spurs (2022) ===
On February 21, 2022, Bowman was traded from the Agua Caliente Clippers to the Austin Spurs in exchange for Cameron Reynolds.

Bowman joined the San Antonio Spurs for the 2022 NBA Summer League.

=== New Basket Brindisi (2022–2023) ===
Bowman signed with New Basket Brindisi of the Italian Lega Basket Serie A on August 18, 2022. He averaged 11.8 points, 4 rebounds, 2.7 assists, and a league-high 1.7 steals per game during the season.

=== Universo Treviso Basket (2023–2025) ===
On July 15, 2023, he signed with Treviso Basket of the Lega Basket Serie A. He averaged 14 points, 3.1 rebounds, 1.9 assists, and one steal per game in his first season with the team. Bowman resigned with Treviso for a second season.

=== Reyer Venezia (2025–present) ===
On July 7, 2025, Bowman signed with Reyer Venezia of the Italian Lega Basket Serie A (LBA).

== Career statistics ==
Legend
GP	Games played	GS	Games started	MPG	Minutes per game
FG%	Field goal percentage	3P%	3-point field goal percentage	FT%	Free throw percentage
RPG	Rebounds per game	APG	Assists per game	SPG	Steals per game
BPG	Blocks per game	PPG	Points per game	**Bold**	Career high

=== NBA ===
==== Regular season ====
Year	Team	GP	GS	MPG	FG%	3P%	FT%	RPG	APG	SPG	BPG	PPG
2019–20	Golden State	45	12	22.6	.417	.308	.829	2.7	2.9	1.0	.2	7.4
Career		45	12	22.6	.417	.308	.829	2.7	2.9	1.0	.2	7.4

=== College ===
*	Led NCAA Division I

Year	Team	GP	GS	MPG	FG%	3P%	FT%	RPG	APG	SPG	BPG	PPG
2016–17	Boston College	32	29	28.8	**.492**	**.449**	.712	4.8	2.9	1.2	.1	14.3
2017–18	Boston College	**35**	**35**	38.2	.422	.362	**.807**	6.8	**4.7**	**1.5**	.3	17.6
2018–19	Boston College	31	30	**39.4***	.404	.374	.761	**7.5**	4.0	1.4	**.6**	**19.0**
Career		98	94	35.5	.433	.388	.762	6.4	3.9	1.3	.3	16.9

== Personal life ==
Bowman's brother, Michael, was also a standout receiver at Havelock and committed to play college football at South Carolina at a joint ceremony where Ky also committed to North Carolina. The elder Bowman lost his scholarship after being convicted of stealing Apple products from an elementary school. Bowman has stated that his decision to pursue basketball instead of football was in large part due to reflection after his brother's arrest.
