= St. Joseph High School (Metuchen, New Jersey) =

Catholic high school in Middlesex County, New Jersey, US

Location
- 145 Plainfield Road; Metuchen, Middlesex County, New Jersey 08840; United States; 40°33′12″N 74°22′20″W

Information
- Type: Private
- Motto: Where excellence is a habit, not a goal.
- Religious affiliation: Catholic
- Patron saint: St. Joseph
- Established: 1961; 65 years ago
- Authority: Brothers of the Sacred Heart
- NCES School ID: 00867902
- President: Stephen Balog '73
- Principal: Anne Rivera
- Faculty: 42.8 FTEs
- Grades: 9–12
- Gender: Boys
- Enrollment: 571 (as of 2023–24)
- Student to teacher ratio: 13.3:1
- Campus size: 70 acres (280,000 m^{2})
- Campus type: Suburban
- Colors: Green and white
- Athletics: 14 sports
- Athletics conference: Greater Middlesex Conference (general); Big Central Football Conference (football)
- Team name: Falcons
- Accreditation: Middle States Association of Colleges and Schools; New Jersey Association of Independent Schools
- Publication: The Vignette (literary magazine)
- Newspaper: The Falcon
- Yearbook: The Evergreen
- School fees: $1,900 (2024–25)
- Tuition: $18,893 (2024–25)
- Affiliation: Brothers of the Sacred Heart
- Website: www.stjoes.org

St. Joseph High School, also known as St. Joe's, is an independent, all-boys Catholic college preparatory school located on a 70-acre (280,000 m^{2}) campus in Metuchen, in Middlesex County, in the U.S. state of New Jersey. The school draws students from an area encompassing over forty school districts and over seventy grammar schools in Middlesex, Monmouth, Somerset, and Union counties, as well as other outlying areas. It is located in the Diocese of Metuchen. The school has been accredited by the Middle States Association of Colleges and Schools Commission on Elementary and Secondary Schools since 1968 and by the New Jersey Association of Independent Schools since 2022.

St. Joseph is operated by the Brothers of the Sacred Heart, who have been active in American education since their arrival from Lyon, France, in 1847. From 1901 to 1961, the school was a center for training and educating Brothers prior to their apostolate. The school opened in September 1961 as a high school open to the public. The main school building was dedicated in the spring of 1963. There are both lay and religious teachers.

As of the 2023–24 school year, the school had an enrollment of 571 students and 42.8 classroom teachers (on an FTE basis), for a student–teacher ratio of 13.3:1. The school's student body was 66.9% (382) White, 12.6% (72) Asian, 9.3% (53) Black, 6.8% (39) two or more races, 2.6% (15) Hispanic, 1.1% (6) Native Hawaiian / Pacific Islander and 0.7% (4) American Indian / Alaska Native.

Since 2018, Anne Rivera has been the principal for St. Joseph. She replaced Justin Fleetwood, who was president of the school until 2020. Stephen Balog '73 was appointed as the school's interim president following the retirement of John G. Nolan P'09. He was appointed at the beginning of the 26-27 school year.

== Student life ==
=== Zenga Library ===
The Zenga Library was built in 2003, taking over the school's original gymnasium. Since 2000, the library has been updated to become digital-centric, with nearly 800,000 selections available online for students, faculty, staff and alumni.

=== Athletics ===
The St. Joseph High School Falcons compete in the Red Division of the Greater Middlesex Conference (GMC), which is comprised of public and private high schools in the Middlesex County area, and operates under the supervision of the New Jersey State Interscholastic Athletic Association (NJSIAA). With 862 students in grades 10–12, the school was classified by the NJSIAA for the 2019–20 school year as Non-Public A for most athletic competition purposes, which included schools with an enrollment of 381 to 1,454 students in that grade range (equivalent to Group III for public schools). The football team competes in the American Gold of the Big Central Football Conference, which includes 60 public and private high schools in Hunterdon, Middlesex, Somerset, Union and Warren counties, which are broken down into 10 divisions by size and location. The school was classified by the NJSIAA as Non-Public Group A (equivalent to Group III/IV/V for public schools) for football for 2024–2026, which included schools with 738 to 1,404 students.

The school fields interscholastic teams from freshmen through varsity levels in various sports including football, cross country, soccer, basketball, bowling, ice hockey, swimming, winter track, baseball, golf, lacrosse, spring track, crew, tennis, volleyball, and wrestling. Football was added to sports at St. Joseph's, with varsity play beginning in the 2010 season, with the team playing independently in 2011 and beginning play in the GMC White Division in 2012. Wrestling returned to the sports offerings at St. Joseph's beginning during the 2018–2019 school year.

The school's first varsity teams were established in 1963, including track, basketball and baseball. A varsity soccer team was set up in the following year. The school has won state titles in basketball, bowling, cross country, winter and spring track, soccer, swimming, tennis, lacrosse and volleyball.

St. Joseph's soccer team has won seven NJSIAA state championships, winning the Non-Public A state title in 1964 (against runner-up St. Cecilia High School in the tournament final), 1971 (vs. Notre Dame High School), 1972 (vs. Notre Dame), 1976 (vs. Bergen Catholic High School), 1978 (vs. Saint Joseph Regional High School of Montvale), 1988 (vs. Bergen Catholic) and 1994 (vs. Don Bosco Preparatory High School). The 1971 team finished the season with a 14-3-1 record after winning the Parochial A state title with a 1–0 defeat of Notre Dame on a penalty kick with minutes left in regulation.

The boys track team won the Non-Public Group A spring / outdoor track state championship in 1972 (as co-champion), 1976 and 1998.

The cross country team won the Non-Public Group A state championship in 1973 and 1974.

The swimming team was formed in 1968. St. Joseph has won 22 state swimming championships: in 1980–1991, 1993–1997, 1999, 2002–2004 and 2006. The program's 22 state titles are ranked second in the state. The team has won 40 consecutive Greater Middlesex Conference championships in total.

The tennis team won the Non-Public A state championship in 1987, defeating runner-up Bergen Catholic High School in the finals.

The ice hockey team won the Handchen Cup in 1991 and the Kolodney Cup in 2012–2017, 2019 and 2020.

The varsity volleyball program has brought home five state championships: in 2002 (defeating Hunterdon Central Regional High School in the final match of the tournament), 2006 (vs. Bridgewater-Raritan High School), 2008 (vs. St. Peter's Preparatory School), 2023 (vs. Summit High School) and 2024 (vs. Garfield High School). The program's five state titles are tied for third-most in the state. The team has also won six sectional state championships in 2006, 2008, 2010, 2011, 2023, and 2024.

The lacrosse team won the Non-Public A state championship in 2010, defeating St. Augustine Preparatory School in the tournament final.

The basketball team won the Non-Public Group B state championship in 2012 (against runner-up Seton Hall Preparatory School in the playoff final), 2014 (vs. St. Peter's Preparatory School) and 2014 (vs. St Peter's). The team won their first Tournament of Champions title in 2014, holding on to beat Newark East Side 49–47 in the championship game, after a last second three-point shot by East Side was deflected.

The bowling team won the NJSIAA Group I state championships in 2023 and the Group II title in 2024. During the 2023 season, the team went undefeated in both games and matches. Following their Group II title, the Falcons won an unofficial "Tournament of Champions" and were ranked No. 1 by NJ.com. Kai Strothers '26 won the NJSIAA individual bowling title in 2023 and 2024. Saint Joe's participated in the U.S. High School Bowling National Championship in June 2024, where the team finished No. 9 in the country, while Strothers earned the school's first national championship.

Although no longer offered, the school once had a competitive gymnastics program, winning state championships in 1992 and 1993. Water polo is also no longer played.

The St. Joseph athletes are supported by their student fan section, commonly known as the "Falcon Flock."

In March 2015 the school began construction on a new football stadium and track and field facility. The field and surrounding track were completed for the start of the 2015 football season.

The school announced that for the 2018–2019 season, wrestling will make a return after being inactive for 24 years.

Before the start of the 2022 season, the St. Joseph baseball team was ranked 7th in the state, according to NJ.com.

== Publications ==
=== The Falcon ===
The student body publishes a newspaper, The Falcon. The Falcon is entirely student run. Published monthly, the newspaper seeks to inform the student body of important events transpiring in the St. Joseph community. The Falcon has often been recognized by the American Scholastic Press Association for first place among high school newspapers in its national contest, including four consecutive awards from 2005 to 2008. Long considered to be a branch of the administration's marketing and recruiting plans, The Falcon took a significant step in Fall 2009 toward student-interest stories and articles that were occasionally critical of administrative policies. Frequent segments include "Brother Mike's Movie Review," student columns, and a sports section.

=== The Vignette ===
The school publishes a yearly literary magazine. In 1963, The Falcon had a literary contest and published their winners in a special edition. This contest continued to be held under the auspices of the newspaper until it grew into the current school literary magazine, The Vignette, which has since won various awards and received national recognition. Another product of the arts program was the Drama Club, established in 1963 with its first production, Stalag 17.

=== Evergreen ===
The student-run yearbook is published annually by those who choose to participate the club.

=== Saint Joseph Radio Network ===
A student-run radio network doing live broadcasts on all athletics around campus.

== Extracurricular achievements ==
On February 29, 2012, the 2011-2012 College Bowl team traveled to Manhattan to compete in MSG Varsity's annual show The Challenge. The Challenge, hosted by Jared Cotter, showcases the best and brightest high school students from 192 tri-state area high schools testing competing teams on their knowledge of history, arts and literature, current events, math, and science in front of a live studio audience. St. Joes won its first two matches against DePaul Catholic and Howell Township to advance to the state quarterfinals on March 15, 2012. On the final day of competition, St. Joseph High School defeated three teams, (Chatham High School, Torah Academy of Bergen County, and Mountain Lakes), all in close matches, to win its 2nd straight New Jersey Challenge state championship. As New Jersey champions, St. Joseph received $2,500. Although they were able to advance to the tri-state championship, St. Joseph High School did not emerge victorious.

The Saint Joseph History Bowl team competed at the National History Bowl championships in Alexandria, VA in 2011, 2012, 2013, and 2014, finishing in 3rd, 5th, 5th, and 9th places respectively. Individually competing in the National History Bee in 2012, Senior Alex Frey of Dunellen, NJ won the national championship, going on to win the international championship as well, and Sophomore Jack Mehr finished in the top ten of the Junior Varsity competition. The following year, Mehr and another player were semifinalists in the Varsity and Junior Varsity divisions respectively.

In 1999 and 2000, the school's chess team was the New Jersey high school team champion, winning the Father Casimir J. Finley Trophy.

== Controversy ==
On June 21, 2015, a former history teacher, Brother John Spalding (74 at the time), was charged with maintaining child pornography on a computer that the school had provided to him. Spalding was charged with possessing child pornography and endangering the welfare of a child. He was released on $75,000 bail, and subsequently transferred by the school. Spalding died on October 15, 2023 in Pascoag, Rhode Island at the age of 82.

In 2017, the school was sued via separate lawsuits by four former employees, Thomas Scarano, Eugene Tyrrell, Jerry Smith, and Thomas Cunningham, over the termination of their employment. The lawsuits for Scarano and Tyrrell state that they were fired due to age discrimination. The case for Smith stated that he was fired due to age discrimination and over claims that he was involved in tuition payments for student-athletes, of which he denied involvement. The suits for Scarano, Tyrrell, and Smith, were settled out of court and as of July 2018, there has been no resolution or updates to Cunningham's case.

== Notable alumni ==
- R. J. Allen (born 1990, class of 2008), professional soccer player who currently plays for Orlando City SC and has played as a defender for New York City FC in Major League Soccer
- Wade Baldwin IV (born 1996, class of 2014), professional basketball player for Fenerbahce of the Turkish Basketball Super League, formerly for the Memphis Grizzlies
- Tyus Battle (born 1997, class of 2016), college basketball player for the Syracuse Orange
- Brandon Bielak (born 1996, class of 2014), pitcher for the Houston Astros of Major League Baseball
- Jon Bon Jovi (born 1962), musician, actor and lead singer of the band Bon Jovi, attended for two years before transferring
- Andrew Bynum (born 1987, class of 2005), basketball player drafted by the Los Angeles Lakers
- John Carlson (born 1990, transferred), professional ice hockey defenseman for the Washington Capitals, drafted in the 1st round (27th overall) of the 2008 NHL entry draft
- Quenton DeCosey (born 1994, class of 2012), professional basketball player for Koroivos of the Greek Basket League
- James Freis (born 1970), global fraud expert and former director of the Financial Crimes Enforcement Network
- Marc Johnstone (born 1996, class of 2015), NHL hockey forward for the Pittsburgh Penguins
- Jim McGreevey (born 1957, class of 1975), former Governor of New Jersey
- Tim Mulqueen (born 1966), soccer goalkeeping coach and former goalkeeper who coached the US National Team at the 2008 Summer Olympics in Beijing
- Marques Townes (born 1995, class of 2014), basketball player for the Loyola Ramblers men's basketball team
- Karl-Anthony Towns (born 1995, class of 2014), basketball player named to the Dominican Republic national basketball team Olympic squad as a 16-year-old and number one overall pick in the 2015 NBA draft by the Minnesota Timberwolves, power forward for the New York Knicks
- Breein Tyree (born 1998, class of 2016), point guard / shooting guard for the Ole Miss Rebels men's basketball team
- Jay Williams (born 1981, class of 1999), McDonald's All-American, Duke University guard, two time All-American and 2002 NBA draft #2 pick of the Chicago Bulls, ESPN college basketball analyst
- Garry Witts (born 1959, class of 1977), retired professional basketball player for the NBA's Washington Bullets
