= Tyus Battle =

American basketball player (born 1997)

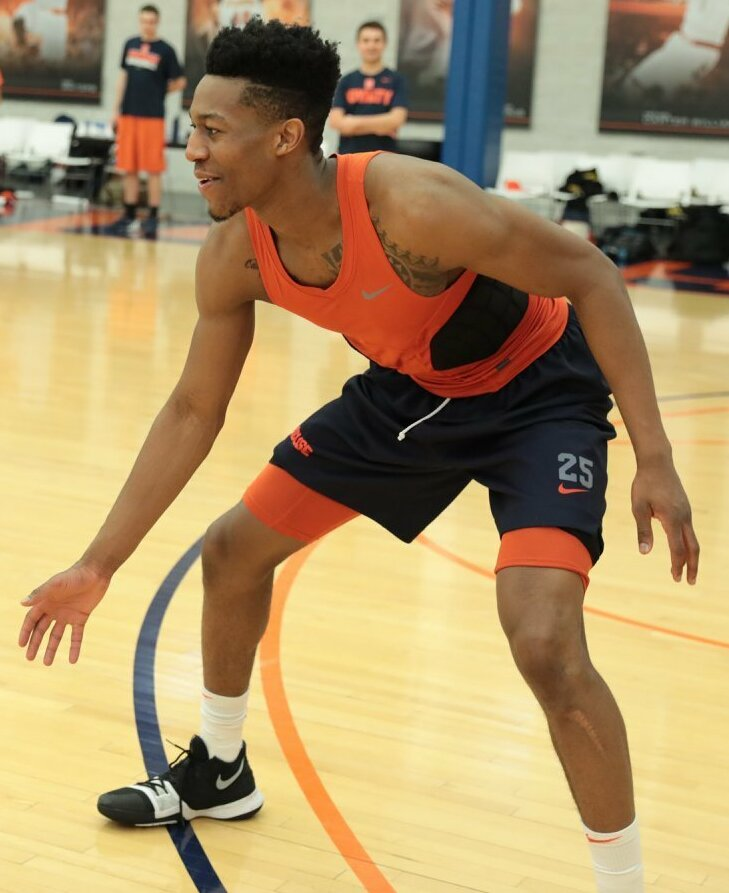
- Battle with Syracuse in 2018

Personal information
- Born: September 23, 1997 (age 29) Livingston, New Jersey, U.S.
- Listed height: 1.98 m (6 ft 6 in)
- Listed weight: 93 kg (205 lb)

Career information
- High school: Gill St. Bernard's School (Gladstone, New Jersey); St. Joseph (Metuchen, New Jersey)
- College: Syracuse (2016–2019)
- NBA draft: 2019: undrafted
- Playing career: 2019–2023
- Position: Shooting guard / small forward

Career history
- 2019–2020: Iowa Wolves
- 2020–2021: BC Enisey
- 2021–2022: Dinamo Sassari
- 2022: Hapoel Gilboa Galil
- 2023: ADA Blois
- 2023: Guangxi Rhinos

Career highlights
- Second-team All-ACC (2018); Third-team All-ACC (2019)
- Stats at Basketball Reference
Medals
Men's basketball
Representing the United States
FIBA U17 World Championship
Gold medal – first place	2014 Dubai	National team

Tyus Akili Battle (born September 23, 1997) is an American professional basketball player He played college basketball for the Syracuse Orange. He earned a gold medal with USA Basketball at the 2014 FIBA Under-17 World Championship. A prospective target of many college basketball recruiters, he committed to the Michigan Wolverines in May 2015, but reopened his recruitment and committed to Syracuse.

== Early life ==
A native of Edison, New Jersey, Battle first became a nationally ranked basketball player in sixth grade. He played for Gill St. Bernard's School in Gladstone, New Jersey for freshman, sophomore, and junior year but then transferred to St. Joseph High School in Metuchen, New Jersey, which was closer to home and allowed him to follow in the footsteps of former standouts of the school Jay Williams and Karl-Anthony Towns. Battle earned high rankings among the national class of 2016. Although he endured a wrist injury during the season, Battle had averaged 22.5 points, 6.3 rebounds, 3.6 assists and 2 steals per game as a 2013–14 sophomore. As a junior, Battle missed the first six weeks of the season with a foot injury after being named the Somerset County, New Jersey player of the year as a sophomore. He returned to the lineup at the end of January 2015. He only appeared in 9 games during his junior season, as a result. His average fell to 16.9 points in his limited junior campaign.

Michigan made Battle a scholarship offer in June 2014. Kentucky head coach John Calipari visited Battle on Halloween 2014. After receiving 24 scholarship offers, Battle narrowed his list of schools to 11 on November 3, 2014, via Twitter: Connecticut, Syracuse, Duke, Ohio State, Louisville, Florida, Kentucky, Miami, Villanova, Virginia, and Michigan. He narrowed his list of candidate schools to seven on February 23, 2015: Connecticut, Syracuse, Duke, Ohio State, Louisville, Michigan, and Notre Dame. Michigan head coach John Beilein visited Battle in New Jersey in February 2015. Battle took official visits to Duke and Louisville in April 2015 before visiting Michigan and had planned to visit Syracuse in late May 2015. Syracuse coach Jim Boeheim had an in-home visit with Battle. Battle had also visited a Michigan camp during the summer of 2014.

At the time of his May 11, 2015 verbal commitment, he ranked no. 14 as a 5-star member of the ESPN 60 for the class of 2016. He was also ranked no. 14 by Rivals.com, no. 10 by Scout.com, and no. 12 by 247Sports.com. He was the no. 4 shooting guard in the class according to 247Sports. Battle had taken his official visit at Michigan on May 7. At the time of his signing, Michigan had the top 2016 recruiting class with Battle and a pair of 6 feet 10 inches (2.08 m) centers (Jon Teske and Austin Davis). Although at the time of Battle's signing, the entire set of scholarships for the class of 2016 seemed to be allocated, some sources reported that Michigan was expected to continue to lure point guards like Cassius Winston and Devearl Ramsey to play with Battle. Battle was Michigan's most highly regarded commitment since Mitch McGary, who committed to Michigan in 2011. On June 19, Battle decommitted from Michigan and scheduled an official visit to Syracuse. On July 13, he committed to Syracuse.

College recruiting
Name	Hometown	School	Height	Weight	Commit date
Tyus Battle; SG	Edison, NJ	St. Joseph High School (NJ)	6 ft 5.5 in (1.97 m)	185 lb (84 kg)	Nov 5, 2015
Tyus Battle; SG	Recruit ratings: Scout: Rivals: 247Sports: ESPN:				
Overall recruit ranking: Scout: 10, 4 (SG), 1 (NJ) Rivals: 14, 8 (G), 1 (NJ) ESPN: 14, 4 (SG), 1 (NJ)
Note: In many cases, Scout, Rivals, 247Sports, On3, and ESPN may conflict in their listings of height and weight.; In these cases, the average was taken. ESPN grades are on a 100-point scale.; Sources: "Michigan 2016 Basketball Commitments". Rivals.; "2016 Michigan Basketball Commits". Scout.; "ESPN Recruiting Nation Basketball". ESPN.; "Scout.com Team Recruiting Rankings". Scout.; "2016 Team Ranking". Rivals.

== College career ==
Battle averaged 11.3 points per game as a freshman. As a sophomore, he was a second team 2017–18 All-ACC selection. In the 2018 NCAA tournament, Battle led the Orange to the Sweet Sixteen round where they were eliminated by Duke. Battle led NCAA Division I in minutes played per game (39.0). As a sophomore, Tyus Battle scored his 1,000th point. He averaged 19.2 points per game on 32 percent shooting from the 3-point line. Following his sophomore season, Battle declared for the 2018 NBA draft without signing with an agent. On May 30, 2018, Battle withdrew his name from the draft to return to Syracuse for his junior season. He averaged 17.2 points per game as a junior and improved his shooting. At the end of the season he declared for the NBA draft, forfeiting his final season of eligibility.

== Professional career ==
After going undrafted in the 2019 NBA draft, Battle signed an Exhibit 10 contract with the Minnesota Timberwolves. He was officially added to the Timberwolves’ preseason roster on October 14. He was released and added to the Timberwolves’ NBA G League affiliate, the Iowa Wolves. Battle averaged 8.0 points and 3.5 rebounds per game. On July 27, 2020, he signed with BC Enisey of the VTB United League. Battle won the VTB United League Slam Dunk Contest during their All-Star Weekend on February 14, 2021.

On July 9, 2021, he has signed with Dinamo Sassari of the Italian Lega Basket Serie A (LBA). He averaged 7.6 points, 2.3 rebounds, and 1.3 assists per game. On January 11, 2022, Battle signed with Hapoel Gilboa Galil of the Israeli Premier League.

On March 20, 2023, he signed with ADA Blois of the LNB Pro A.

== National team career ==
In 2013, Battle was cut early in the process of determining the United States team for the 2013 FIBA Americas Under-16 Championship. However, he was one of three players selected to the 12-man team for the 2014 FIBA Under-17 World Championship that had not been named to Team USA the year before. Three seconds before the end of the first period, Battle scored the basket that put USA Basketball ahead for good in the U17 championship game against Australia as Team USA went on to win the gold medal. On June 2, 2015, Battle was announced as an attendee at the 24-man June 12–26, 2015, USA Basketball Men's U19 World Championship Team training camp to select the 12-man roster for the 2015 FIBA Under-19 World Championship. However, on the eve of the training camp, Battle announced that the effects of injuries that limited his junior season would keep him from trying out for the team. Thus, he was not among the 21 players who attended the training camp on June 12.

== Career statistics ==
Legend
GP	Games played	GS	Games started	MPG	Minutes per game
FG%	Field goal percentage	3P%	3-point field goal percentage	FT%	Free throw percentage
RPG	Rebounds per game	APG	Assists per game	SPG	Steals per game
BPG	Blocks per game	PPG	Points per game	**Bold**	Career high

*	Led NCAA Division I

=== College ===
Year	Team	GP	GS	MPG	FG%	3P%	FT%	RPG	APG	SPG	BPG	PPG
2016–17	Syracuse	34	25	30.7	**.433**	**.366**	.798	2.1	1.7	1.3	.2	11.3
2017–18	Syracuse	**37**	**37**	**39.0***	.399	.322	**.839**	2.9	2.1	**1.5**	.2	**19.2**
2018–19	Syracuse	32	32	36.3	.431	.321	.763	**3.3**	**2.5**	1.2	**.3**	17.2
Career		103	94	35.4	.417	.335	.803	2.8	2.1	1.3	.2	16.0

== Personal life ==
Battle is the son of Daniella and Gary Battle. Gary was an All-American at University of New Haven (of the Division II New England Collegiate Conference) and his stepmother (Tanya Battle, née Wood) played basketball at the University of Miami. His brother Khalif Battle played basketball for Gonzaga University and now plays for a professional team in Europe. His sister, GiGi Battle, is committed to play for Indiana University and will be a freshman in this upcoming season.
