= International School of Ouagadougou =

Location
- Ouagadougou; Burkina Faso

Information
- Established: 1976
- Grades: Pre-K - Grade 12
- Enrollment: 180 (2019-2020)
- Language: English

The International School of Ouagadougou is an English-language medium international school in Zogona, Ouagadougou, Burkina Faso, established in 1976. The school is independent and teaches students from prekindergarten to Grade 12. In 2019 to 2020 there were 180 students. The school was created to cater for students from the international community but host-country students are also accepted.

== Faculty ==
In the 2020–2021 school year, there are 17 faculty members, including 7 U.S. citizens, 5 host-county nationals, and 5 third-country nationals. There are also 5 teaching assistants, 2 host-country nationals and 3 third-country nationals. The director oversees the overall school operations. In upper school there is a dean of academics and a dean of students, and in elementary school, an associate elementary school principal. Other faculty include a full-time team of administrative personnel, a librarian, a part-time doctor, a nurse, and a science lab technician.

== Curriculum ==
The school follows an American-style curriculum. French is taught daily from K-grade 12. An IB Program in grades 11 and 12 provides students with the skills needed for tertiary institutions.

== Accreditation and memberships ==
The school is accredited by the U.S.-based Middle States Association of Colleges and Schools and is a member of the Association of International Schools in Africa.

== Facilities ==
The school is on a 7-acre (28,000 m^{2}) purpose-built campus adjacent to the residential Zone du Bois and close to the city center. It includes a walled and secure area of 5 acres (20,000 m^{2}), a grassed playing field, dressing rooms, a volleyball/basketball/badminton court, a swimming pool, two lighted tennis courts, and a squash court. Ten major buildings house the classrooms, administration, and resource areas, including a library of around 15,000 volumes, a computer laboratory, a science laboratory, student center, and recreation club/snack bar. The campus is networked for direct service line internet access and has an intranet.

== Scholarship program ==
In 2006 ISO signed a protocol agreement with the Ministry of National Education and Literacy. This agreement offers each year, to two students among the top ten who have passed the Brevet d'Etudes du Premier Cycle, the possibility of obtaining a full scholarship at ISO until the end of their graduate studies, as well as a national scholarship (subject to conditions) for their higher education studies. After evaluations and interviews, two students are selected each year to continue their graduate studies at ISO. They then have 4 years to complete their second cycle in the American system instead of 3 years in the Burkinabe system. Thus in 13 years, the school has received 28 scholarship students, 8 of whom are currently studying at ISO, 19 in universities abroad and 1 in a Burkinabe university.
