= Dwayne Sutton =

American basketball player (born 1997)

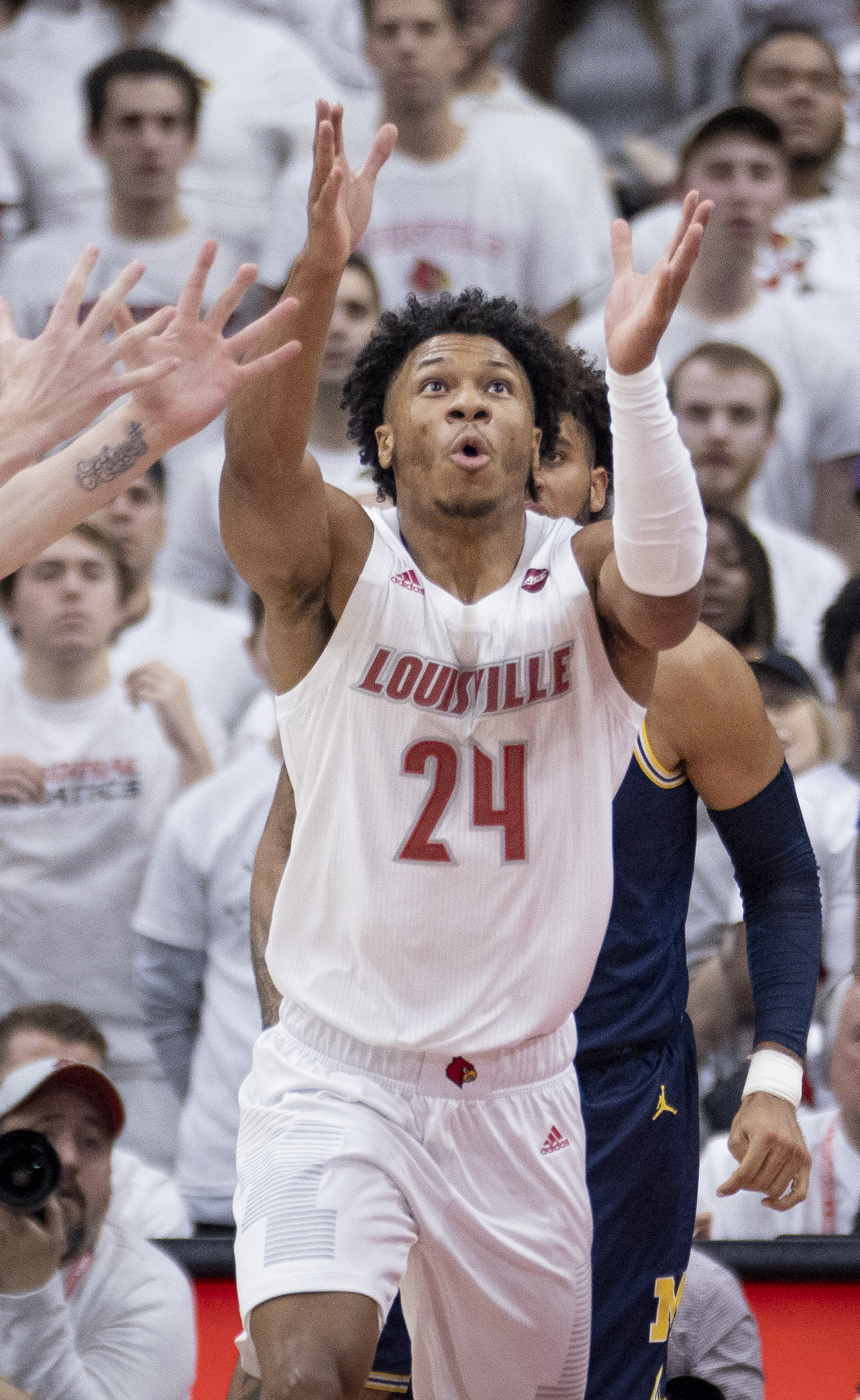

Personal information
- Born: February 26, 1997 (age 29)
- Listed height: 6 ft 5 in (1.96 m)
- Listed weight: 220 lb (100 kg)

Career information
- High school: duPont Manual (Louisville, Kentucky)
- College: UNC Asheville (2015–2016); Louisville (2017–2020)
- NBA draft: 2020: undrafted
- Playing career: 2021–2022
- Position: Small forward

Career history
- 2021: Santa Cruz Warriors
- 2022: Cleveland Charge

Career highlights
- Big South tournament MVP (2016)
- Stats at Basketball Reference

Dwayne Sutton (born February 26, 1997) is an American former professional basketball player He played college basketball at UNC Asheville and Louisville.

== Early life and high school ==
Sutton grew up in the Russell neighborhood of Louisville, Kentucky and attended duPont Manual High School. Sutton was named All-Seventh Region and honorable mention All-State by The Courier-Journal after averaging 21 points per game in his junior season. As a senior, he finished eighth in the state with 24.4 points per game and sixth with 12.1 rebounds per game and was named first team All-State and a finalist for Kentucky Mr. Basketball. Sutton committed to play college basketball at UNC Asheville during the summer going into his senior year over offers Wright State, Wofford, St. Francis and Pikeville.

== College career ==
Sutton began his collegiate career at UNC Asheville. As a freshman, he averaged 12 points and 7.7 rebounds per game and was named to the Big South Conference All-Freshman team. He had 25 points and 18 rebounds in the Big South tournament title game against Winthrop and was named the tournament MVP. Following the end of the season, Sutton left the program and transferred to Louisville.

Sutton joined the Cardinals as a walk-on and sat out one season due to NCAA transfer rules. As a sophomore, he came off the bench to average 4.3 points and 4.0 rebounds per game. He became a starter as a redshirt junior and averaged 10 points, 6.9 rebounds, 1.9 assists, and 0.9 steals per game. Sutton was named the Atlantic Coast Conference (ACC) Player of the Week on January 14, 2019, after scoring 12 points and grabbing 11 rebounds in an 89–86 overtime loss to Pittsburgh and scoring 17 points with 10 rebounds, seven assists and four steals in 83–62 win over 12th ranked North Carolina. As a redshirt senior, Sutton averaged 9.1 points, 8.2 rebounds and 1.7 assists in 31 games and was named honorable mention All-ACC.

== Professional career ==
After going undrafted in the 2020 NBA draft, Sutton signed a contract with the Golden State Warriors with the expectation that he would compete in training camp for a two-way contract with the team. On December 18, 2020, the Warriors released Sutton.

=== Santa Cruz Warriors (2021) ===
On January 12, 2021, Sutton was included in roster of Santa Cruz Warriors which would participate the 2020–21 season in the ESPN Wide World of Sports Complex of Walt Disney World Resort located near Orlando. On February 23, 2021, the Santa Cruz Warriors announced that they had released Sutton due to a season-ending injury.

=== Cleveland Charge (2022) ===
Following his rehab from injury, Sutton signed with the Stockton Kings, but did not appear in a game for the team. On January 28, 2022, his rights were traded to the Cleveland Charge in exchange for Sheldon Mac.

On February 24, 2022, Sutton's rights were traded to the Memphis Hustle in exchange for Cameron Young.
