= 2018–19 North Carolina Tar Heels men's basketball team =

American college basketball season

2018–19 North Carolina Tar Heels men's basketball

ACC regular season co-champions

NCAA tournament, Sweet Sixteen
- Conference: Atlantic Coast Conference

Ranking
- Coaches: No. 9
- AP: No. 3
- Record: 29–7 (16–2 ACC)
- Head coach: Roy Williams (16th season)
- Assistant coaches: Steve Robinson (16th season); Hubert Davis (7th season); Brad Frederick (2nd season)
- Home arena: Dean E. Smith Center

2018–19 ACC men's basketball standings
	Conf.				Overall
Team	W		L	PCT	W		L	PCT
No. 2 Virginia	16	–	2	.889	35	–	3	.921
No. 3 North Carolina	16	–	2	.889	29	–	7	.806
No. 1 Duke †	14	–	4	.778	32	–	6	.842
No. 10 Florida State	13	–	5	.722	29	–	8	.784
No. 16 Virginia Tech	12	–	6	.667	26	–	9	.743
Syracuse	10	–	8	.556	20	–	14	.588
Louisville	10	–	8	.556	20	–	14	.588
NC State	9	–	9	.500	24	–	12	.667
Clemson	9	–	9	.500	20	–	14	.588
Georgia Tech	6	–	12	.333	14	–	18	.438
Boston College	5	–	13	.278	14	–	17	.452
Miami (FL)	5	–	13	.278	14	–	18	.438
Wake Forest	4	–	14	.222	11	–	20	.355
Pittsburgh	3	–	15	.167	14	–	19	.424
Notre Dame	3	–	15	.167	14	–	19	.424
† 2019 ACC tournament winner Rankings from AP poll

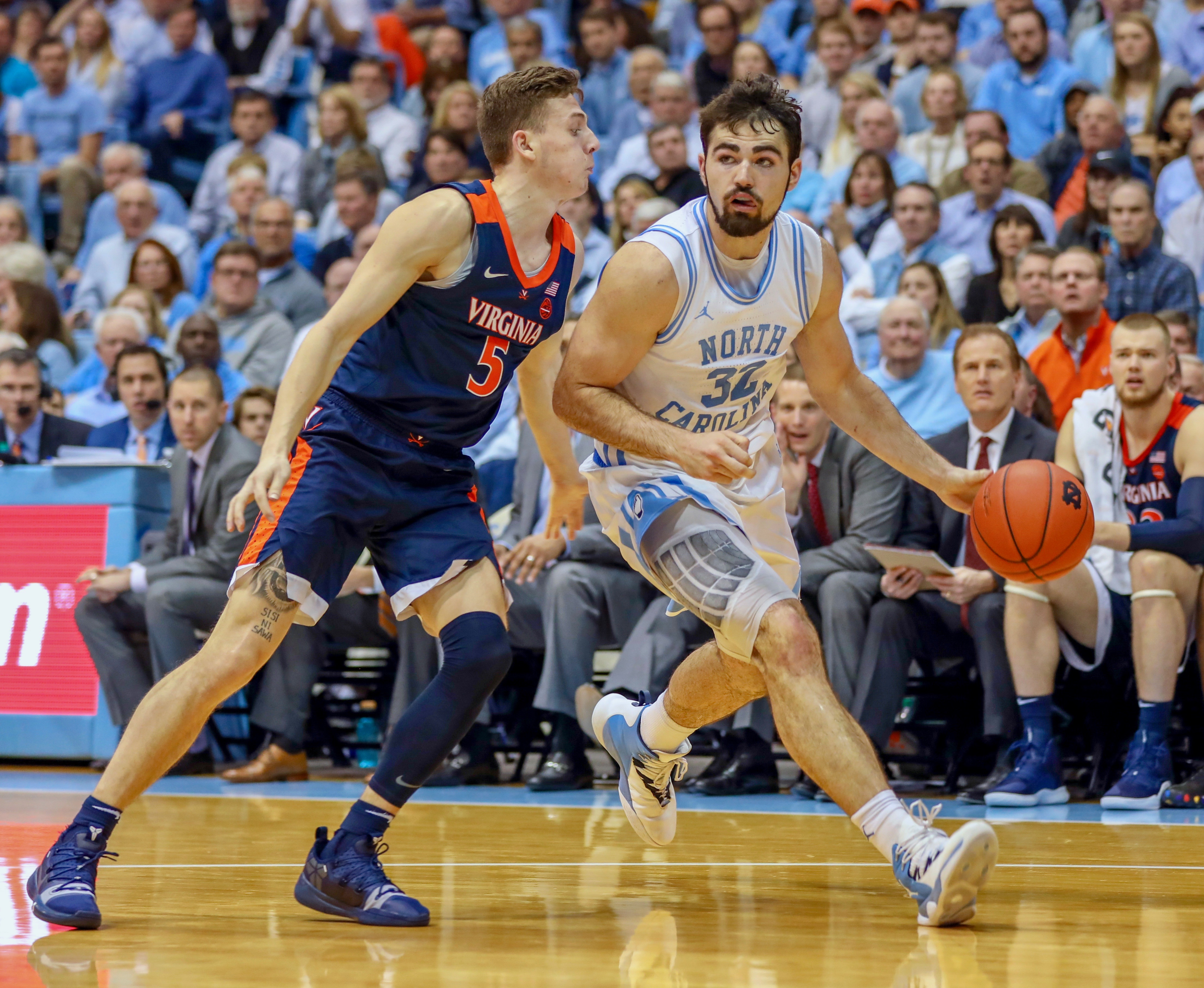
Luke Maye dribbles while guarded by Virginia's Kyle Guy (February 11)

The 2018–19 North Carolina Tar Heels men's basketball team represented the University of North Carolina at Chapel Hill during the 2018–19 NCAA Division I men's basketball season. The team's head coach was Roy Williams, who was in his 16th season as UNC's head men's basketball coach. The Tar Heels played their home games at the Dean Smith Center in Chapel Hill, North Carolina as members of the Atlantic Coast Conference. They finished the season 29–7, 16–2 in ACC play to finish tied for the regular season conference championship with Virginia. As the No. 2 seed in the ACC tournament, they advanced to the semifinals before ultimately losing to Duke. They received an at-large bid to the NCAA tournament as the No. 1 seed in the Midwest region, where they advanced to the Sweet Sixteen before losing to Auburn.

== Previous season ==
The Tar Heels finished the 2017–18 season with a record of 26–11, 11–7 in ACC play to finish in a four-way tie for third place. As the No. 6 seed in the ACC tournament, they defeated Syracuse, Miami, and Duke before losing to Virginia in the championship game. They received an at-large bid to the NCAA tournament as the No. 2 seed in the West region where they defeated Lipscomb before losing to Texas A&M in the second round.

== Offseason ==
=== Departures ===
Name	Number	Pos.	Height	Weight	Year	Hometown	Notes
Theo Pinson	1	G/F	6'6"	205	Senior	Greensboro, North Carolina	Graduated
Joel Berry II	2	G	6'0"	195	Senior	Apopka, Florida	Graduated
Kane Ma	14	G	6'0"	175	Senior	Greensboro, North Carolina	Graduated
Aaron Rohlman	25	F	6'6"	210	Senior	Gastonia, North Carolina	Graduated
Jalek Felton	5	G	6'3"	180	Freshman	Columbia, South Carolina	Dismissed

=== 2018 recruiting class ===
College recruiting
Name	Hometown	School	Height	Weight	Commit date
Nassir Little; SF	Orange Park, FL	Orlando Christian Prep	6 ft 8 in (2.03 m)	215 lb (98 kg)	Oct 4, 2017
Nassir Little; SF	Recruit ratings: Scout: Rivals: 247Sports: ESPN: (93)				
Coby White; PG/SG	Goldsboro, NC	Greenfield School	6 ft 3 in (1.91 m)	165 lb (75 kg)	Jul 28, 2016
Coby White; PG/SG	Recruit ratings: Scout: Rivals: 247Sports: ESPN: (91)				
Leaky Black; SF	Concord, NC	Cox Mill High School	6 ft 7 in (2.01 m)	180 lb (82 kg)	Jan 15, 2016
Leaky Black; SF	Recruit ratings: Scout: Rivals: 247Sports: ESPN: (87)				
Overall recruit ranking: Scout: #8 Rivals: #9 247Sports: #8 ESPN: #7
Note: In many cases, Scout, Rivals, 247Sports, On3, and ESPN may conflict in their listings of height and weight.; In these cases, the average was taken. ESPN grades are on a 100-point scale.; Sources:

== Roster ==
2018–19 North Carolina Tar Heels men's basketball team
Players
Coaches

Pos.	#	Name	Height	Weight	Year	Previous school	Hometown
G	0	Seventh Woods	6 ft 2 in (1.88 m)	185 lb (84 kg)	Jr	Hammond School	Columbia, South Carolina
G	1	Leaky Black	6 ft 7 in (2.01 m)	185 lb (84 kg)	Fr	Concord High School	Concord, North Carolina
G	2	Coby White	6 ft 5 in (1.96 m)	185 lb (84 kg)	Fr	Greenfield School	Goldsboro, North Carolina
G	3	Andrew Platek	6 ft 3 in (1.91 m)	200 lb (91 kg)	So	Northfield Mount Hermon	Schenectady, New York
G	4	Brandon Robinson	6 ft 4 in (1.93 m)	170 lb (77 kg)	Jr	Douglas County High School	Douglasville, Georgia
F	5	Nassir Little	6 ft 6 in (1.98 m)	220 lb (100 kg)	Fr	Orlando Christian Prep	Orange Park, Florida
F	11	Shea Rush	6 ft 5 in (1.96 m)	210 lb (95 kg)	Jr	The Barstow School	Kansas City, Missouri
G	13	Cameron Johnson	6 ft 9 in (2.06 m)	210 lb (95 kg)	RS Sr	Our Lady of the Sacred Heart/Pittsburgh	Moon Township, Pennsylvania
F	15	Garrison Brooks	6 ft 9 in (2.06 m)	230 lb (104 kg)	So	Auburn High School	Lafayette, Alabama
C	21	Sterling Manley	6 ft 11 in (2.11 m)	235 lb (107 kg)	So	Pickerington Central High School	Reynoldsburg, Ohio
F	22	Walker Miller (W)	6 ft 10 in (2.08 m)	230 lb (104 kg)	So	New Hampton School	Greensboro, North Carolina
G	24	Kenny Williams	6 ft 4 in (1.93 m)	185 lb (84 kg)	Sr	L.C. Bird	Midlothian, Virginia
G	25	Caleb Ellis (W)	6 ft 4 in (1.93 m)	185 lb (84 kg)	Jr	Cary Christian School	Apex, North Carolina
G	30	K. J. Smith (W)	6 ft 2 in (1.88 m)	175 lb (79 kg)	RS So	IMG Academy	Thousand Oaks, California
F	32	Luke Maye	6 ft 8 in (2.03 m)	240 lb (109 kg)	Sr	Hough	Huntersville, North Carolina
F	35	Ryan McAdoo (W) (redshirt)	6 ft 5 in (1.96 m)	201 lb (91 kg)	So	Saint Andrew's School	Boca Raton, Florida
C	42	Brandon Huffman	6 ft 10 in (2.08 m)	250 lb (113 kg)	So	Word of God Christian Academy	Goldsboro, North Carolina

Head coach

- Roy Williams (North Carolina)

Assistant coach(es)

- Steve Robinson (Radford)
- Hubert Davis (North Carolina)
- Brad Frederick (North Carolina)

Legend

- (C) Team captain
- (S) Suspended
- (I) Ineligible
- (W) Walk-on
- Injured
- Current redshirt

Roster

== Schedule and results ==
Date time, TV	Rank^{#}	Opponent^{#}	Result	Record	High points	High rebounds	High assists	Site (attendance) city, state
Exhibition
November 2, 2018*; 7:30 pm, ACCN Extra	No. 8	Mount Olive	W 107–64		16 – Brooks	16 – Brooks	6 – White	Dean Smith Center (20,314); Chapel Hill, NC
Non-conference regular season
November 6, 2018*; 7:00 pm, ESPN2	No. 8	at Wofford	W 78–67	1–0	24 – Maye	8 – Johnson	5 – Williams	Jerry Richardson Indoor Stadium (3,400); Spartanburg, SC
November 9, 2018*; 7:00 pm, ESPNU	No. 8	at Elon	W 116–67	2–0	21 – Tied	10 – Maye	5 – Tied	Schar Center (5,245); Elon, NC
November 12, 2018*; 7:00 pm, ESPN2	No. 7	Stanford	W 90–72	3–0	17 – Johnson	8 – Tied	4 – Tied	Dean Smith Center (19,647); Chapel Hill, NC
November 16, 2018*; 7:00 pm, ACCRSN	No. 7	Tennessee Tech; Las Vegas Invitational Campus-Site Game	W 108–58	4–0	15 – Maye	8 – Maye	8 – Woods	Dean Smith Center (20,816); Chapel Hill, NC
November 19, 2018*; 8:00 pm, ACCN Extra	No. 7	Saint Francis (PA); Las Vegas Invitational Campus-Site Game	W 101–76	5–0	20 – Johnson	10 – Maye	9 – Williams	Dean Smith Center (20,547); Chapel Hill, NC
November 22, 2018*; 7:30 pm, FS1	No. 7	vs. Texas; Las Vegas Invitational Semifinal	L 89–92	5–1	33 – White	9 – Maye	5 – Williams	Orleans Arena (7,489); Paradise, NV
November 23, 2018*; 4:00 pm, FOX	No. 7	vs. No. 17 UCLA; Las Vegas Invitational Third-place game	W 94–78	6–1	19 – White	8 – Maye	8 – White	Orleans Arena (7,489); Paradise, NV
November 28, 2018*; 9:00 pm, ESPN	No. 11	at No. 7 Michigan; ACC–Big Ten Challenge	L 67–84	6–2	12 – White	15 – Maye	4 – White	Crisler Center (12,707); Ann Arbor, MI
December 5, 2018*; 9:00 pm, ESPN2	No. 14	UNC Wilmington	W 97–69	7–2	21 – Johnson	10 – Manley	8 – Williams	Dean Smith Center (20,083); Chapel Hill, NC
December 15, 2018*; 7:00 pm, ESPN2	No. 12	No. 4 Gonzaga	W 103–90	8–2	25 – Johnson	16 – Maye	6 – White	Dean Smith Center (21,750); Chapel Hill, NC
December 22, 2018*; 5:15 pm, CBS	No. 9	vs. No. 19 Kentucky; CBS Sports Classic/Rivalry	L 72–80	8–3	17 – Johnson	8 – Brooks	5 – Williams	United Center (15,124); Chicago, IL
December 29, 2018*; 12:00 pm, ESPN2	No. 14	Davidson	W 82–60	9–3	17 – Johnson	14 – Maye	7 – White	Dean Smith Center (21,486); Chapel Hill, NC
January 2, 2019*; 7:00 pm, ESPN2	No. 15	Harvard	W 77–57	10–3	14 – Maye	7 – Tied	4 – White	Dean Smith Center (21,329); Chapel Hill, NC
ACC Regular Season
January 5, 2019; 12:00 pm, Raycom	No. 15	at Pittsburgh	W 85-60	11–3 (1–0)	22 – White	11 – Maye	5 – Brooks	Petersen Events Center (12,508); Pittsburgh, PA
January 8, 2019; 9:00 pm, ESPN	No. 12	at No. 15 NC State; Rivalry	W 90–82	12–3 (2–0)	21 – Maye	11 – Tied	5 – Tied	PNC Arena (19,722); Raleigh, NC
January 12, 2019; 12:00 pm, ESPN	No. 12	Louisville	L 62–83	12–4 (2–1)	12 – Williams	11 – Maye	3 – Maye	Dean Smith Center (21,243); Chapel Hill, NC
January 15, 2019; 9:00 pm, ESPN	No. 13	Notre Dame	W 75–69	13–4 (3–1)	17 – White	10 – Maye	6 – Johnson	Dean Smith Center (20,475); Chapel Hill, NC
January 19, 2019; 12:00 pm, ESPN2	No. 13	at Miami (FL)	W 85–76	14–4 (4–1)	22 – Johnson	9 – Maye	8 – White	Watsco Center (7,131); Coral Gables, FL
January 21, 2019; 7:00 pm, ESPN	No. 11	No. 10 Virginia Tech	W 103–82	15–4 (5–1)	27 – White	7 – White	6 – White	Dean Smith Center (21,148); Chapel Hill, NC
January 29, 2019; 7:00 pm, ACCRSN	No. 9	at Georgia Tech	W 77–54	16–4 (6–1)	22 – Johnson	9 – Tied	8 – White	McCamish Pavilion (8,600); Atlanta, GA
February 2, 2019; 2:00 pm, ESPN	No. 9	at No. 15 Louisville	W 79–69	17–4 (7–1)	20 – Maye	11 – Maye	4 – Tied	KFC Yum! Center (19,985); Louisville, KY
February 5, 2019; 8:00 pm, Raycom	No. 8	NC State; Rivalry	W 113–96	18–4 (8–1)	31 – Maye	12 – Maye	6 – Brooks	Dean Smith Center (21,124); Chapel Hill, NC
February 9, 2019; 12:00 pm, Raycom	No. 8	Miami (FL)	W 88–85 ^{OT}	19–4 (9–1)	33 – White	6 – Tied	6 – White	Dean Smith Center (21,383); Chapel Hill, NC
February 11, 2019; 7:00 pm, ESPN	No. 8	No. 4 Virginia; Rivalry	L 61–69	19–5 (9–2)	17 – White	11 – Maye	5 – Williams	Dean Smith Center (21,750); Chapel Hill, NC
February 16, 2019; 12:00 pm, Raycom	No. 8	at Wake Forest	W 95–57	20–5 (10–2)	27 – Johnson	7 – Tied	6 – White	LJVM Coliseum (14,352); Winston-Salem, NC
February 20, 2019; 9:00 pm, ESPN/Raycom	No. 8	at No. 1 Duke; Rivalry	W 88–72	21–5 (11–2)	30 – Maye	15 – Maye	4 – Tied	Cameron Indoor Stadium (9,314); Durham, NC
February 23, 2019; 3:45 pm, CBS	No. 8	No. 16 Florida State	W 77–59	22–5 (12–2)	18 – Tied	11 – Maye	4 – White	Dean Smith Center (21,520); Chapel Hill, NC
February 26, 2019; 9:00 pm, Raycom	No. 5	Syracuse	W 93–85	23–5 (13–2)	34 – White	12 – Maye	6 – Maye	Dean Smith Center (21,135); Chapel Hill, NC
March 2, 2019; 6:00 pm, ESPN	No. 5	at Clemson	W 81–79	24–5 (14–2)	28 – White	10 – Maye	5 – White	Littlejohn Coliseum (9,248); Clemson, SC
March 5, 2019; 8:00 pm, Raycom	No. 3	at Boston College	W 79–66	25–5 (15–2)	22 – Johnson	20 – Maye	5 – Tied	Conte Forum (7,731); Chestnut Hill, MA
March 9, 2019; 6:00 pm, ESPN	No. 3	No. 4 Duke; Rivalry	W 79–70	26–5 (16–2)	21 – White	16 – Maye	7 – Maye	Dean Smith Center (21,750); Chapel Hill, NC
ACC Tournament
March 14, 2019; 7:00 pm, ESPN	(2) No. 3	vs. (7) Louisville; Quarterfinals	W 83–70	27–5	19 – Tied	9 – Maye	6 – White	Spectrum Center (19,691); Charlotte, NC
March 15, 2019; 9:00 pm, ESPN	(2) No. 3	vs. (3) No. 5 Duke; Semifinals/Rivalry	L 73–74	27–6	23 – Johnson	13 – Maye	4 – White	Spectrum Center (20,116); Charlotte, NC
NCAA tournament
March 22, 2019*; 9:20 pm, TNT	(1 MW) No. 3	vs. (16 MW) Iona; First Round	W 88–73	28–6	21 – Johnson	9 – Maye	4 – Johnson	Nationwide Arena (19,426); Columbus, OH
March 24, 2019*; 2:40 pm, CBS	(1 MW) No. 3	vs. (9 MW) Washington; Second Round	W 81–59	29–6	20 – Tied	14 – Maye	7 – Johnson	Nationwide Arena (19,610); Columbus, OH
March 29, 2019*; 7:29pm, TBS	(1 MW) No. 3	vs. (5 MW) No. 14 Auburn; Sweet Sixteen	L 80–97	29–7	15 – Tied	4 – Tied	7 – Maye	Sprint Center (17,385); Kansas City, MO
*Non-conference game. ^{#}Rankings from AP Poll. (#) Tournament seedings in parentheses. MW=Midwest. All times are in Eastern Time.

== Rankings ==
Ranking movements Legend: ██ Increase in ranking ██ Decrease in ranking
	Week																				
Poll	Pre	1	2	3	4	5	6	7	8	9	10	11	12	13	14	15	16	17	18	19	Final
AP	8	7	7	11	14	12	9	14	15	12	13	11	9	8	8	8	5	3	3	3	Not released
Coaches	7	7^	6	13	12	12	10	14	15	12	15	12	10	8	8	9	5	3	3	4	9

*AP does not release post-NCAA Tournament rankings
^Coaches did not release a Week 2 poll.
