= 2018–19 Georgia Tech Yellow Jackets men's basketball team =

American college basketball season

2018–19 Georgia Tech Yellow Jackets men's basketball
- Conference: Atlantic Coast Conference
- Record: 14–18 (6–12 ACC)
- Head coach: Josh Pastner (3rd season)
- Assistant coaches: Eric Reveno; Julian Swartz; Anthony Wilkins
- Home arena: McCamish Pavilion

2018–19 ACC men's basketball standings
	Conf.				Overall
Team	W		L	PCT	W		L	PCT
No. 2 Virginia	16	–	2	.889	35	–	3	.921
No. 3 North Carolina	16	–	2	.889	29	–	7	.806
No. 1 Duke †	14	–	4	.778	32	–	6	.842
No. 10 Florida State	13	–	5	.722	29	–	8	.784
No. 16 Virginia Tech	12	–	6	.667	26	–	9	.743
Syracuse	10	–	8	.556	20	–	14	.588
Louisville	10	–	8	.556	20	–	14	.588
NC State	9	–	9	.500	24	–	12	.667
Clemson	9	–	9	.500	20	–	14	.588
Georgia Tech	6	–	12	.333	14	–	18	.438
Boston College	5	–	13	.278	14	–	17	.452
Miami (FL)	5	–	13	.278	14	–	18	.438
Wake Forest	4	–	14	.222	11	–	20	.355
Pittsburgh	3	–	15	.167	14	–	19	.424
Notre Dame	3	–	15	.167	14	–	19	.424
† 2019 ACC tournament winner Rankings from AP poll

The 2018–19 Georgia Tech Yellow Jackets men's basketball team represented the Georgia Institute of Technology during the 2018–19 NCAA Division I men's basketball season. They were led by third-year head coach Josh Pastner and played their home games at Hank McCamish Pavilion as members of the Atlantic Coast Conference.

== Previous season ==
The Yellow Jackets finished the 2017–18 season 13–19, 6–12 in ACC play to finish in 13th place. They lost in the first round of the ACC tournament to Boston College.

== Departures ==
Name	Number	Pos.	Height	Weight	Year	Hometown	Reason for departure
Justin Moore	0	G	6'4"	162	Sophomore	San Diego, CA	Transferred
Tadric Jackson	1	G	6'2"	203	Senior	Tifton, GA	Graduated
Josh Okogie	5	G	6'5"	213	Sophomore	Snellville, GA	Declare for 2018 NBA draft
Jon Brown	23	G	6'5"	172	Freshman	Miami, FL	Transferred to West Florida
Ben Lammers	44	C	6'10"	231	Senior	San Antonio, TX	Graduated

=== Incoming transfers ===
Name	Number	Pos.	Height	Weight	Year	Hometown	Previous School
James Banks III	1	C	6'10"	240	Junior	Decatur, GA	Texas

== 2018 recruiting class ==
College recruiting information
Name	Hometown	School	Height	Weight	Commit date
Kristian Sjolund; SF	Katy, TX	Tompkins High School	6 ft 9 in (2.06 m)	190 lb (86 kg)	Aug 21, 2017
Kristian Sjolund; SF	Recruit ratings: Scout: Rivals: 247Sports: ESPN:				
Michael Devoe; SG	Orlando, FL	Montverde Academy	6 ft 4 in (1.93 m)	175 lb (79 kg)	Sep 23, 2017
Michael Devoe; SG	Recruit ratings: Scout: Rivals: 247Sports: ESPN:				
Khalid Moore; SF	Briarwood, NY	Archbishop Molly High School	6 ft 6 in (1.98 m)	175 lb (79 kg)	Oct 24, 2017
Khalid Moore; SF	Recruit ratings: Scout: Rivals: 247Sports: ESPN:				
Overall recruit ranking:
Note: In many cases, Scout, Rivals, 247Sports, On3, and ESPN may conflict in their listings of height and weight.; In these cases, the average was taken. ESPN grades are on a 100-point scale.; Sources: "2018 Team Ranking". Rivals.

== Roster ==
2018–19 Georgia Tech Yellow Jackets men's basketball team
Players
Coaches

Pos.	#	Name	Height	Weight	Year	Previous school	Hometown
G	0	Michael Devoe	6 ft 4 in (1.93 m)	188 lb (85 kg)	Fr	Montverde Academy	Orlando, FL
F/C	1	James Banks III	6 ft 8 in (2.03 m)	243 lb (110 kg)	Jr	La Lumiere HS; Texas	Decatur, GA
G	2	Shembari Phillips	6 ft 3 in (1.91 m)	202 lb (92 kg)	RS Jr	Wheeler HS/Tucker HS; Tennessee	Atlanta, GA
F	3	Evan Cole	6 ft 9 in (2.06 m)	217 lb (98 kg)	So	South Forsyth HS	Cumming, GA
G	4	Brandon Alston	6 ft 5 in (1.96 m)	200 lb (91 kg)	RS Sr	Herndon HS; Lehigh	Vienna, VA
F	5	Moses Wright	6 ft 9 in (2.06 m)	221 lb (100 kg)	So	William G. Enloe HS	Raleigh, NC
G	10	Jose Alvarado	6 ft 0 in (1.83 m)	176 lb (80 kg)	So	Christ the King HS	Brooklyn, NY
F	11	Evan Jester (W)	6 ft 6 in (1.98 m)	191 lb (87 kg)	So	Sandy Creek HS	Riverdale, GA
F	12	Khalid Moore	6 ft 6 in (1.98 m)	200 lb (91 kg)	Fr	Archbishop Molloy HS	Briarwood, NY
G	13	Curtis Haywood	6 ft 5 in (1.96 m)	202 lb (92 kg)	So	Mustang HS/Brewster Academy	Oklahoma City, OK
F	24	Sylvester Ogbonda	6 ft 10 in (2.08 m)	237 lb (108 kg)	RS Jr	National Christian Academy	Fort Washington, MD
C	32	Avi Schafer (W)	6 ft 8 in (2.03 m)	235 lb (107 kg)	RS So	Brewster Academy	Osaka, Japan
F	34	Abdoulaye Gueye	6 ft 9 in (2.06 m)	217 lb (98 kg)	RS Sr	Central Park Christian	Dakar, Senegal
F	35	Kristian Sjolund	6 ft 7 in (2.01 m)	200 lb (91 kg)	Fr	Obra D. Tompkins HS	Katy, TX
G	55	Malachi Rice (W)	6 ft 0 in (1.83 m)	186 lb (84 kg)	So	Brebeuf Jesuit Prep	Indianapolis, IN

Head coach

- Josh Pastner (Arizona)

Assistant coach(es)

- Eric Reveno (Stanford)
- Julian Swartz (Carroll)
- Anthony Wilkins (Kent State)

Legend

- (C) Team captain
- (S) Suspended
- (I) Ineligible
- (W) Walk-on
- Injured
- Current redshirt

Roster

== Schedule and results ==
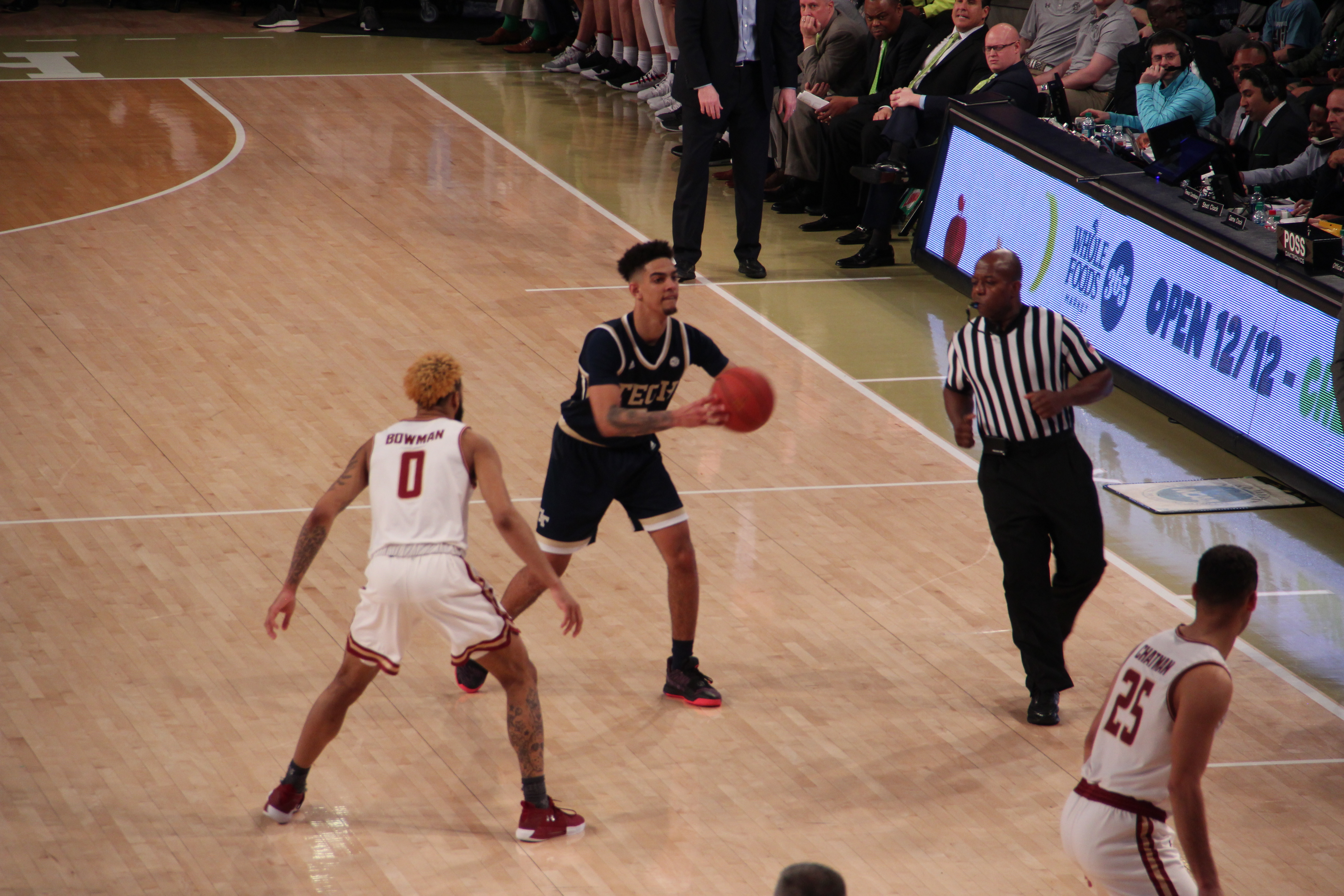
Georgia Tech in a game against Boston College

Date time, TV	Rank^{#}	Opponent^{#}	Result	Record	High points	High rebounds	High assists	Site (attendance) city, state
Exhibition
November 3, 2018*; 6:00 pm, ACCN Extra		Florida Tech	W 87–36		16 – Cole	11 – Ogbonda	4 – Tied	McCamish Pavilion (1,478); Atlanta, GA
Non-conference regular season
November 9, 2018*; 7:30 pm, ACCN Extra		Lamar; Deep South Showcase	W 88–69	1–0	17 – Alston	9 – Ogbonda	5 – Alvarado	McCamish Pavilion (4,691); Atlanta, GA
November 13, 2018*; 9:00 pm, ESPN2		at No. 5 Tennessee	L 53–66	1–1	16 – Alston	7 – Banks III	1 – Tied	Thompson–Boling Arena (16,219); Knoxville, TN
November 16, 2018*; 7:30 pm, ACCN Extra		East Carolina; Deep South Showcase	W 79–54	2–1	18 – Haywood II	6 – Tied	6 – Alvarado	McCamish Pavilion (4,922); Atlanta, GA
November 21, 2018*; 7:30 pm, ACCN Extra		Texas–Rio Grande Valley; Deep South Showcase	W 72–44	3–1	14 – Devoe	8 – Banks III	6 – Haywood II	McCamish Pavilion (4,175); Atlanta, GA
November 23, 2018*; 4:00 pm, ACCN Extra		Prairie View A&M; Deep South Showcase	W 65–54	4–1	15 – Alvarado	9 – Banks III	6 – Alvarado	McCamish Pavilion (4,306); Atlanta, GA
November 28, 2018*; 9:00 pm, ESPNU		at Northwestern; ACC–Big Ten Challenge	L 61–67	4–2	24 – Alvarado	12 – Banks III	3 – Moore	Welsh–Ryan Arena (6,378); Evanston, IL
December 1, 2018*; 12:00 pm, ESPNU		vs. St. John's; HoopHall Miami Invitational	L 73–76	4–3	17 – Alvarado	12 – Banks III	4 – Alvarado	American Airlines Arena (5,749); Miami, FL
December 9, 2018*; 2:00 pm, ACCN Extra		Florida A&M	W 73–40	5–3	15 – Alston	4 – Tied	5 – Banks III	McCamish Pavilion (4,951); Atlanta, GA
December 17, 2018*; 7:30 pm, ACCN Extra		Gardner–Webb	L 69–79	5–4	20 – Banks III	10 – Banks III	5 – Alvarado	McCamish Pavilion (4,268); Atlanta, GA
December 19, 2018*; 9:00 pm, SECN		at Arkansas	W 69–65	6–4	20 – Alvarado	14 – Banks III	3 – Tied	Bud Walton Arena (14,368); Fayetteville, AR
December 22, 2018*; 12:00 pm, ESPNU		Georgia; Rivalry	L 59–70	6–5	14 – Devoe	8 – Tied	5 – Alvarado	McCamish Pavilion (8,600); Atlanta, GA
December 28, 2018*; 4:00 pm, ACCN Extra		Kennesaw State	W 87–57	7–5	16 – Gueye	8 – Gueye	6 – Devoe	McCamish Pavilion (5,589); Atlanta, GA
January 2, 2019*; 7:30 pm, ACCN Extra		USC Upstate	W 79–63	8–5	16 – Cole	6 – Banks III	4 – Tied	McCamish Pavilion (4,397); Atlanta, GA
ACC Regular Season
January 5, 2019; 2:00 pm, ACCRSN		Wake Forest	W 92–79	9–5 (1–0)	20 – Banks III	5 – Wright	7 – Alvarado	McCamish Pavilion (6,397); Atlanta, GA
January 9, 2019; 7:00 pm, ACCRSN		No. 9 Virginia Tech	L 49–52	9–6 (1–1)	20 – Alvarado	6 – Tied	4 – Alvarado	McCamish Pavilion (6,166); Atlanta, GA
January 12, 2019; 6:00 pm, ESPN2		at Syracuse	W 73–59	10–6 (2–1)	19 – Alvarado	7 – Banks III	7 – Haywood II	Carrier Dome (19,257); Syracuse, NY
January 16, 2019; 9:00 pm, ACCRSN		at Clemson	L 60–72	10–7 (2–2)	16 – Banks III	5 – Alvarado	3 – Alvarado	Littlejohn Coliseum (6,693); Clemson, SC
January 19, 2019; 4:00 pm, Raycom		Louisville	L 51–79	10–8 (2–3)	24 – Banks III	11 – Banks III	3 – Banks III	McCamish Pavilion (8,600); Atlanta, GA
January 22, 2019; 7:00 pm, ACCRSN		Notre Dame	W 63–61	11–8 (3–3)	16 – Banks III	10 – Banks III	5 – Devoe	McCamish Pavilion (5,861); Atlanta, GA
January 26, 2019; 7:00 pm, Raycom		at No. 2 Duke	L 53–66	11–9 (3–4)	14 – Gueye	8 – Tied	6 – Alvarado	Cameron Indoor Stadium (9,314); Durham, NC
January 29, 2019; 7:00 pm, ACCRSN		No. 9 North Carolina	L 54–77	11–10 (3–5)	14 – Gueye	6 – Banks III	6 – Haywood II	McCamish Pavilion (8,600); Atlanta, GA
February 2, 2019; 12:00 pm, Raycom		at No. 25 Florida State	L 49–59	11–11 (3–6)	15 – Gueye	7 – Gueye	2 – Tied	Donald L. Tucker Center (10,181); Tallahassee, FL
February 6, 2019; 9:00 pm, ACCRSN		Clemson	L 42–65	11–12 (3–7)	13 – Banks III	8 – Banks III	4 – Alvarado	McCamish Pavilion (5,636); Atlanta, GA
February 10, 2019; 6:00 pm, ESPNU		at Notre Dame	L 59–69	11–13 (3–8)	18 – Devoe	12 – Banks III	6 – Devoe	Edmund P. Joyce Center (8,438); South Bend, IN
February 13, 2019; 8:00 pm, Raycom		at No. 22 Virginia Tech	L 68–76	11–14 (3–9)	22 – Devoe	8 – Devoe	5 – Devoe	Cassell Coliseum (9,275); Blacksburg, VA
February 16, 2019; 12:00 pm, Raycom		No. 17 Florida State	L 47–69	11–15 (3–10)	17 – Alvarado	10 – Banks III	3 – Alvarado	McCamish Pavilion (8,600); Atlanta, GA
February 20, 2019; 9:00 pm, ACCRSN		Pittsburgh	W 73–65	12–15 (4–10)	29 – Alvarado	10 – Banks III	5 – Alvarado	McCamish Pavilion (4,959); Atlanta, GA
February 23, 2019; 2:00 pm, ACCRSN		at Miami (FL)	L 65–80	12–16 (4–11)	20 – Alvarado	7 – Alvarado	4 – Alvarado	Watsco Center (6,813); Coral Gables, FL
February 27, 2019; 7:00 pm, ESPN2		at No. 2 Virginia	L 51–81	12–17 (4–12)	12 – Alvarado	7 – Tied	4 – Alvarado	John Paul Jones Arena (14,094); Charlottesville, VA
March 3, 2019; 6:00 pm, ESPNU		Boston College	W 81–78 ^{OT}	13–17 (5–12)	21 – Alvarado	9 – Banks III	6 – Haywood II	McCamish Pavilion (6,285); Atlanta, GA
March 6, 2019; 9:00 pm, ACCRSN		at NC State	W 63–61	14–17 (6–12)	19 – Banks III	9 – Banks III	7 – Devoe	PNC Arena (15,803); Raleigh, NC
ACC tournament
March 12, 2019; 2:30 pm, ESPN2	(10)	vs. (15) Notre Dame; First Round	L 71–78	14–18	25 – Wright	11 – Banks III	4 – Banks III	Spectrum Center; Charlotte, NC
*Non-conference game. ^{#}Rankings from AP Poll. (#) Tournament seedings in parentheses. All times are in Eastern Time.
