= 2018–19 NC State Wolfpack men's basketball team =

American college basketball season

2018–19 NC State Wolfpack men's basketball

NIT, Quarterfinals
- Conference: Atlantic Coast Conference
- Record: 24–12 (9–9 ACC)
- Head coach: Kevin Keatts (2nd season)
- Assistant coaches: James Johnson; Roy Roberson; Takayo Siddle
- Home arena: PNC Arena

2018–19 ACC men's basketball standings
	Conf.				Overall
Team	W		L	PCT	W		L	PCT
No. 2 Virginia	16	–	2	.889	35	–	3	.921
No. 3 North Carolina	16	–	2	.889	29	–	7	.806
No. 1 Duke †	14	–	4	.778	32	–	6	.842
No. 10 Florida State	13	–	5	.722	29	–	8	.784
No. 16 Virginia Tech	12	–	6	.667	26	–	9	.743
Syracuse	10	–	8	.556	20	–	14	.588
Louisville	10	–	8	.556	20	–	14	.588
NC State	9	–	9	.500	24	–	12	.667
Clemson	9	–	9	.500	20	–	14	.588
Georgia Tech	6	–	12	.333	14	–	18	.438
Boston College	5	–	13	.278	14	–	17	.452
Miami (FL)	5	–	13	.278	14	–	18	.438
Wake Forest	4	–	14	.222	11	–	20	.355
Pittsburgh	3	–	15	.167	14	–	19	.424
Notre Dame	3	–	15	.167	14	–	19	.424
† 2019 ACC tournament winner Rankings from AP poll

The 2018–19 NC State Wolfpack men's basketball team represented North Carolina State University during the 2018–19 NCAA Division I men's basketball season. The Wolfpack, led by second-year head coach Kevin Keatts, played its home games at PNC Arena in Raleigh, North Carolina and were members of the Atlantic Coast Conference (ACC). They finished the season 24–12, 9–9 in ACC play to finish in a tie for eighth place. They lost in the quarterfinals of the ACC tournament to Virginia. They received a bid to the NIT where they lost in the quarterfinals to Lipscomb.

== Previous season ==
The Wolfpack finished the 2017–18 season 21–12, 11–7 in ACC play to finish in a tie for third place. They lost in the second round of the ACC tournament to Boston College. They received an at-large bid to the NCAA tournament where they lost in the first round to Seton Hall.

== Offseason ==
=== Departures ===
Name	Number	Pos.	Height	Weight	Year	Hometown	Notes
Abdul-Malik Abu	0	F	6'8"	240	Senior	Boston, MA	Graduated
Lennard Freeman	1	F	6'8"	267	RS Senior	Washington, D.C.	Graduated
Lavar Batts Jr.	3	G	6'2"	170	Freshman	Concord, NC	Transferred to UNC Asheville
Darius Hicks	5	F	6'7"	231	Sophomore	Quitman, MS	Transferred to Eastern Kentucky
Allerik Freeman	12	G	6'3"	210	RS Senior	Charlotte, NC	Graduated
Ömer Yurtseven	14	F/C	7'0"	245	Sophomore	Istanbul, Turkey	Transferred to Georgetown
Sam Hunt	15	G	6'2"	185	Senior	Greensboro, NC	Graduated
Spencer Newman	31	G	6'3"	186	RS Freshman	Daphne, AL	Transferred

=== Incoming transfers ===
Name	Number	Pos.	Height	Weight	Year	Hometown	Previous School
D. J. Funderburk	0	F	6'9"	205	RS Sophomore	Cleveland, OH	Northwest Florida State College
Sacha Killeya-Jones	1	F	6'10"	221	Junior	Chapel Hill, NC	Kentucky
Eric Lockett	5	G	6'5"	193	RS Senior	Atlanta, GA	FIU
Wyatt Walker	33	C	6'9"	240	Senior	Jacksonville, FL	Samford
Blake Harris	55	G	6'3"	195	Sophomore	Chapel Hill, NC	Missouri

- Under NCAA transfer rules, Killeya-Jones will have to sit out for the 2018–19 season. Will have two years of remaining eligibility.
- Under NCAA transfer rules, Harris has to sit out until January and will be eligible to start in January during the 2018–19 season. Harris has two and a half years of remaining eligibility.

=== Class of 2018 Recruiting Class ===
College recruiting information
Name	Hometown	School	Height	Weight	Commit date
Immanuel Bates; PF	Fayetteville, NC	Northwood Temple Academy	6 ft 9 in (2.06 m)	195 lb (88 kg)	Sep 15, 2017
Immanuel Bates; PF	Recruit ratings: Scout: Rivals: 247Sports: ESPN:				
Ian Steere; PF	Fayetteville, NC	Northwood Temple Academy	6 ft 9 in (2.06 m)	261 lb (118 kg)	Oct 6, 2017
Ian Steere; PF	Recruit ratings: Scout: Rivals: 247Sports: ESPN:				
Jericole Hellems; SF	St. Louis, MO	Chaminade College Prep	6 ft 6 in (1.98 m)	190 lb (86 kg)	Oct 20, 2017
Jericole Hellems; SF	Recruit ratings: Scout: Rivals: 247Sports: ESPN:				
Overall recruit ranking:
Note: In many cases, Scout, Rivals, 247Sports, On3, and ESPN may conflict in their listings of height and weight.; In these cases, the average was taken. ESPN grades are on a 100-point scale.; Sources: "2018 Team Ranking". Rivals.

== Roster ==
2018–19 NC State Wolfpack men's basketball team
Players
Coaches

Pos.	#	Name	Height	Weight	Year	Hometown
F	0	D. J. Funderburk	6 ft 10 in (2.08 m)	210 lb (95 kg)	RS So	Cleveland, Ohio
F	1	Sacha Killeya-Jones (redshirt)	6 ft 11 in (2.11 m)	220 lb (100 kg)	Jr	Chapel Hill, North Carolina
G	2	Torin Dorn	6 ft 5 in (1.96 m)	210 lb (95 kg)	RS Sr	Charlotte, North Carolina
F	4	Jericole Hellems	6 ft 7 in (2.01 m)	198 lb (90 kg)	Fr	St. Louis, Missouri
G	5	Eric Lockett	6 ft 5 in (1.96 m)	193 lb (88 kg)	RS Sr	Warner Robins, Georgia
G	10	Braxton Beverly	6 ft 0 in (1.83 m)	180 lb (82 kg)	So	Hazard, Kentucky
G	11	Markell Johnson	6 ft 1 in (1.85 m)	175 lb (79 kg)	Jr	Cleveland, Ohio
F	12	Manny Bates (redshirt)	6 ft 11 in (2.11 m)	221 lb (100 kg)	Fr	Fayetteville, North Carolina
G	13	C. J. Bryce	6 ft 5 in (1.96 m)	195 lb (88 kg)	RS Jr	Charlotte, North Carolina
G	24	Devon Daniels	6 ft 5 in (1.96 m)	200 lb (91 kg)	RS So	Battle Creek, Michigan
F	33	Wyatt Walker	6 ft 9 in (2.06 m)	240 lb (109 kg)	Sr	Jacksonville, Florida
G	55	Blake Harris	6 ft 3 in (1.91 m)	190 lb (86 kg)	So	Chapel Hill, NC

Head coach

- Kevin Keatts (Ferrum)

Assistant coach(es)

- James Johnson (Ferrum)
- Roy Roberson (Lynchburg)
- Takayo Siddle (Gardner–Webb)

Legend

- (C) Team captain
- (S) Suspended
- (I) Ineligible
- (W) Walk-on
- Injured
- Current redshirt

Roster

== Schedule and results ==
Date time, TV	Rank^{#}	Opponent^{#}	Result	Record	High points	High rebounds	High assists	Site (attendance) city, state
Exhibition
October 29, 2018*; 7:00 pm, ACCN Extra		Chowan	W 111–62	–	22 – Daniels	7 – Dorn	6 – Johnson	PNC Arena; Raleigh, NC
Non-conference regular season
November 6, 2018*; 7:00 pm, ACCN Extra		Mount St. Mary's	W 105–55	1–0	28 – Dorn	9 – Dorn	5 – Johnson	PNC Arena (13,632); Raleigh, NC
November 10, 2018*; 12:00 pm, ACCRSN		Maryland Eastern Shore; Wolfpack Classic	W 95–49	2–0	22 – Dorn	10 – Dorn	7 – Johnson	PNC Arena (13,586); Raleigh, NC
November 13, 2018*; 7:00 pm, ACCN Extra		UNC Asheville	W 100–49	3–0	20 – Daniels	9 – Daniels	5 – Beverly	PNC Arena (13,620); Raleigh, NC
November 17, 2018*; 2:00 pm, ACCN Extra		Maine; Wolfpack Classic	W 82–63	4–0	15 – Dorn	8 – Bryce	5 – Johnson	PNC Arena (13,290); Raleigh, NC
November 20, 2018*; 7:00 pm, ACCRSN		Saint Peter's; Wolfpack Classic	W 85–57	5–0	12 – Dorn	6 – Tied	4 – Harris	PNC Arena (13,308); Raleigh, NC
November 24, 2018*; 5:30 pm, ACCN Extra		Mercer; Wolfpack Classic	W 78–74	6–0	19 – Dorn	9 – Dorn	4 – Beverly	PNC Arena (12,828); Raleigh, NC
November 27, 2018*; 9:00 pm, ESPN2		at No. 22 Wisconsin; ACC–Big Ten Challenge	L 76–79	6–1	21 – Johnson	11 – Dorn	5 – Johnson	Kohl Center (17,012); Madison, WI
December 1, 2018*; 5:00 pm, ESPN2		vs. Vanderbilt; HoopHall Miami Invitational	W 80–65	7–1	19 – Johnson	6 – Tied	7 – Johnson	American Airlines Arena (5,749); Miami, FL
December 5, 2018*; 7:00 pm, ACCN Extra		Western Carolina; Heritage Game	W 100–77	8–1	21 – Daniels	5 – Tied	5 – Harris	Reynolds Coliseum (5,500); Raleigh, NC
December 15, 2018*; 2:00 pm, ESPNU		vs. Penn State; Boardwalk Classic	W 89–78	9–1	18 – Beverly	8 – Walker	5 – Tied	Boardwalk Hall; Atlantic City, NJ
December 19, 2018*; 7:00 pm, ESPN2		No. 7 Auburn	W 78–71	10–1	27 – Johnson	8 – Daniels	4 – Johnson	PNC Arena (17,793); Raleigh, NC
December 22, 2018*; 12:00 pm, ACCRSN		USC Upstate	W 98–71	11–1	15 – Lockett	8 – Tied	8 – Harris	PNC Arena (14,877); Raleigh, NC
December 28, 2018*; 7:00 pm, ACCN Extra	No. 20	Loyola (MD)	W 97–64	12–1	17 – Dorn	8 – Dorn	7 – Daniels	PNC Arena (15,098); Raleigh, NC
ACC regular season
January 3, 2019; 7:00 pm, ESPNU	No. 18	at Miami (FL)	W 87–82	13–1 (1–0)	20 – Johnson	11 – Walker	6 – Beverly	Watsco Center (6,983); Coral Gables, FL
January 8, 2019; 9:00 pm, ESPN	No. 15	No. 12 North Carolina; Rivalry	L 82–90	13–2 (1–1)	21 – Beverly	10 – Dorn	4 – Beverly	PNC Arena (19,500); Raleigh, NC
January 12, 2019; 12:00 pm, Raycom	No. 15	Pittsburgh	W 86–80	14–2 (2–1)	19 – Daniels	10 – Dorn	5 – Dorn	PNC Arena (17,695); Raleigh, NC
January 15, 2019; 8:00 pm, Raycom	No. 17	at Wake Forest; Rivalry	L 67–71	14–3 (2–2)	18 – Dorn	8 – Tied	3 – Tied	LJVM Coliseum (10,157); Winston-Salem, NC
January 19, 2019; 2:00 pm, Raycom	No. 17	at Notre Dame	W 77–73	15–3 (3–2)	23 – Bryce	9 – Dorn	4 – Beverly	Edmund P. Joyce Center (8,709); South Bend, IN
January 24, 2019; 8:00 pm, Raycom	No. 21	at No. 23 Louisville	L 77–84	15–4 (3–3)	19 – Beverly	9 – Bryce	3 – Beverly	KFC Yum! Center (16,322); Louisville, KY
January 26, 2019; 2:00 pm, Raycom	No. 21	Clemson	W 69–67	16–4 (4–3)	16 – Johnson	7 – Bryce	5 – Beverly	PNC Arena (18,180); Raleigh, NC
January 29, 2019; 7:00 pm, ESPN2	No. 23	No. 3 Virginia	L 65–66 ^{OT}	16–5 (4–4)	14 – Johnson	6 – Walker	3 – Daniels	PNC Arena (18,211); Raleigh, NC
February 2, 2019; 12:00 pm, Raycom	No. 23	No. 12 Virginia Tech	L 24–47	16–6 (4–5)	7 – Bryce	12 – Walker	2 – Johnson	PNC Arena (19,500); Raleigh, NC
February 5, 2019; 8:00 pm, Raycom		at No. 8 North Carolina; Rivalry	L 96–113	16–7 (4–6)	17 – Beverly	5 – Tied	4 – Johnson	Dean Smith Center (21,124); Chapel Hill, NC
February 9, 2019; 2:00 pm, Raycom		at Pittsburgh	W 79–76	17–7 (5–6)	21 – Bryce	8 – Dorn	8 – Johnson	Petersen Events Center (8,950); Pittsburgh, PA
February 13, 2019; 8:00 pm, Raycom		Syracuse	W 73–58	18–7 (6–6)	21 – Beverly	12 – Dorn	5 – Johnson	PNC Arena (16,335); Raleigh, NC
February 16, 2019; 6:00 pm, ESPN		at No. 2 Duke; Rivalry	L 78–94	18–8 (6–7)	17 – Dorn	5 – Bryce	10 – Johnson	Cameron Indoor Stadium (9,314); Durham, NC
February 20, 2019; 7:00 pm, ACCRSN		Boston College	W 89–80 ^{OT}	19–8 (7–7)	19 – Daniels	11 – Daniels	4 – Tied	PNC Arena (14,435); Raleigh, NC
February 24, 2019; 6:00 pm, ESPNU		Wake Forest; Rivalry	W 94–74	20–8 (8–7)	25 – Johnson	9 – Dorn	5 – Daniels	PNC Arena (16,053); Raleigh, NC
March 2, 2019; 12:00 pm, ESPN2		at No. 18 Florida State	L 73–78	20–9 (8–8)	18 – Funderburk	9 – Funderburk	2 – Johnson	Donald L. Tucker Center (9,988); Tallahassee, FL
March 6, 2019; 9:00 pm, ACCRSN		Georgia Tech	L 61–63	20–10 (8–9)	17 – Johnson	8 – Dorn	5 – Johnson	PNC Arena (15,803); Raleigh, NC
March 9, 2019; 2:00 pm, ACCRSN		at Boston College	W 73–47	21–10 (9–9)	14 – Bryce	9 – Funderburk	6 – Johnson	Conte Forum (7,279); Chestnut Hill, MA
ACC Tournament
March 13, 2019; 12:00 pm, ESPN/Raycom	(8)	vs. (9) Clemson; Second Round	W 59–58	22–10	23 – Johnson	11 – Dorn	4 – Johnson	Spectrum Center; Charlotte, NC
March 14, 2019; 12:30 pm, ESPN/Raycom	(8)	vs. (1) No. 2 Virginia; Quarterfinals	L 56–76	22–11	13 – Johnson	7 – Dorn	2 – Tied	Spectrum Center; Charlotte, NC
NIT
March 19, 2019*; 7:00 pm, ESPN2	(2)	(7) Hofstra; First Round – UNC Greensboro Bracket	W 84–78	23–11	26 – Johnson	11 – Bryce	5 – Johnson	Reynolds Coliseum (5,500); Raleigh, NC
March 24, 2019*; 7:30 pm, ESPNU	(2)	(6) Harvard; Second Round – UNC Greensboro Bracket	W 78–77	24–11	16 – Bryce	7 – Bryce	5 – Johnson	Reynolds Coliseum (5,500); Raleigh, NC
March 27, 2019*; 9:00 pm, ESPNU	(2)	(5) Lipscomb; Quarterfinals – UNC Greensboro Bracket	L 93–94	24–12	34 – Dorn	10 – Walker	5 – Johnson	Reynolds Coliseum (5,500); Raleigh, NC
*Non-conference game. ^{#}Rankings from AP Poll. (#) Tournament seedings in parentheses. All times are in Eastern Time.

== Rankings ==
Ranking movements Legend: ██ Increase in ranking ██ Decrease in ranking — = Not ranked RV = Received votes
	Week																			
Poll	Pre	1	2	3	4	5	6	7	8	9	10	11	12	13	14	15	16	17	18	Final
AP	RV	RV^	—	—	—	RV	RV	RV	20	18	15	17	21	23	—					Not released
Coaches	RV	RV'	RV'	RV	RV	RV	RV	RV	24	19	16	16	19	22	RV	—				

*AP does not release post-NCAA Tournament rankings
^AP rankings not released for Week 1
'Coaches rankings not released for Week 1 or Week 2
