= 2019 ACC men's basketball tournament =

- 2019 ACC Tournament logo
- Classification: Division I
- Season: 2018–19
- Teams: 15
- Site: Spectrum Center; Charlotte, North Carolina
- Champions: Duke (21st title)
- Winning coach: Mike Krzyzewski (15th title)
- MVP: Zion Williamson (Duke)
- Television: ESPN/2/U; Raycom

2018–19 ACC men's basketball standings
	Conf.				Overall
Team	W		L	PCT	W		L	PCT
No. 2 Virginia	16	–	2	.889	35	–	3	.921
No. 3 North Carolina	16	–	2	.889	29	–	7	.806
No. 1 Duke †	14	–	4	.778	32	–	6	.842
No. 10 Florida State	13	–	5	.722	29	–	8	.784
No. 16 Virginia Tech	12	–	6	.667	26	–	9	.743
Syracuse	10	–	8	.556	20	–	14	.588
Louisville	10	–	8	.556	20	–	14	.588
NC State	9	–	9	.500	24	–	12	.667
Clemson	9	–	9	.500	20	–	14	.588
Georgia Tech	6	–	12	.333	14	–	18	.438
Boston College	5	–	13	.278	14	–	17	.452
Miami (FL)	5	–	13	.278	14	–	18	.438
Wake Forest	4	–	14	.222	11	–	20	.355
Pittsburgh	3	–	15	.167	14	–	19	.424
Notre Dame	3	–	15	.167	14	–	19	.424
† 2019 ACC tournament winner Rankings from AP poll

The 2019 ACC men's basketball tournament was the 66th annual postseason men's basketball tournament for the Atlantic Coast Conference, held March 12–16, 2019, at the Spectrum Center in Charlotte, North Carolina.

The Virginia Cavaliers and North Carolina Tar Heels entered the tournament as the top two seeds, both with 16–2 conference, and ranked #2 and #3 in the country respectively. Both teams were defeated in the semifinals, by the #4 Florida State Seminoles (ranked #12 nationally) and the #3 Duke Blue Devils (ranked #5 nationally). Duke defeated Florida State, 73–63, in the championship game, claiming their 21st ACC Tournament title and 15th during head coach Mike Krzyzewski's tenure. Duke's Zion Williamson was named the tournament's MVP.

== Seeds ==
All 15 ACC teams participated in the tournament, seeded by their record within the conference, with a tiebreaker system to seed teams with identical conference records. The top 4 seeds (Virginia, North Carolina, Duke, and Florida State) received a double bye. Virginia Tech, Syracuse, NC State, Louisville, and Clemson receive single byes. Boston College, Miami, Georgia Tech, Wake Forest, Pittsburgh, and Notre Dame played in the first round.

Seed	School	Conference Record	Tiebreaker
1	Virginia	16–2	1–0 vs. North Carolina
2	North Carolina	16–2	0–1 vs. Virginia
3	Duke	14–4	
4	Florida State	13–5	
5	Virginia Tech	12–6	
6	Syracuse	10–8	1–0 vs. Louisville
7	Louisville	10–8	0–1 vs. Syracuse
8	NC State	9–9	1–0 vs. Clemson
9	Clemson	9–9	0–1 vs. NC State
10	Georgia Tech	6–12	
11	Boston College	5–13	1–0 vs. Miami
12	Miami	5–13	0–1 vs. Boston College
13	Wake Forest	4–14	
14	Pittsburgh	3–15	1–0 vs. Notre Dame
15	Notre Dame	3–15	0–1 vs. Pittsburgh

== Schedule ==
Games were shown on over-the-air television in local media markets by the syndicated ACC Network. Games also aired nationally on various ESPN cable networks with separate telecasts and commentators. The tournament marked the formal end of Raycom Sports' long-term association with the conference; its event rights is now held by ESPN as part of its new cable channel ACC Network.

Session	Game	Time	Matchup	Score	Television	Attendance
First round – Tuesday, March 12
Opening day	1	noon	12 Miami vs 13 Wake Forest	79–71	ESPN; Raycom	9,677
Opening day	2	2:00 pm*	10 Georgia Tech vs 15 Notre Dame	71–78	ESPN; Raycom	9,677
Opening day	3	7:00 pm	11 Boston College vs 14 Pittsburgh	70–80	ESPNU; Raycom	9,677
Second round – Wednesday, March 13
1	4	noon	8 NC State vs 9 Clemson	59–58	ESPN; Raycom	19,691
1	5	2:00 pm*	5 Virginia Tech vs 12 Miami	71–56	ESPN; Raycom	19,691
2	6	7:00 pm	7 Louisville vs 15 Notre Dame	75–53	ESPN2; Raycom	11,884
2	7	9:00 pm*	6 Syracuse vs 14 Pittsburgh	73–59	ESPN2; Raycom	11,884
Quarterfinals – Thursday, March 14
3	8	12:30 pm	1 Virginia vs 8 NC State	76–56	ESPN; Raycom	19,691
3	9	2:30 pm*	4 Florida State vs 5 Virginia Tech	65–63^{OT}	ESPN; Raycom	19,691
4	10	7:00 pm	2 North Carolina vs 7 Louisville	83–70	ESPN; Raycom	19,691
4	11	9:00 pm*	3 Duke vs 6 Syracuse	84–72	ESPN; Raycom	19,691
Semifinals – Friday, March 15
5	12	7:00 pm	1 Virginia vs 4 Florida State	59–69	ESPN; Raycom	20,116
5	13	9:00 pm*	2 North Carolina vs 3 Duke	73–74	ESPN; Raycom	20,116
Championship – Saturday, March 16
6	14	8:30 pm	4 Florida State vs 3 Duke	63–73	ESPN; Raycom	19,691
*Denotes approximate time. Actual time will vary depending on the ending time of the previous game. Game times in ET.

== Bracket ==
First round Tuesday, March 12; ESPN/U/Raycom
12	Miami	79
13	Wake Forest	71
10	Georgia Tech	71
15	Notre Dame	78
11	Boston College	70
14	Pittsburgh	80

Second round Wednesday, March 13; ESPN/2/Raycom
8	NC State	59
9	Clemson	58
5	Virginia Tech	71
12	Miami	56
7	Louisville	75
15	Notre Dame	53
6	Syracuse	73
14	Pittsburgh	59

Quarterfinals; Thursday, March 14; ESPN/Raycom
1	Virginia	76
8	NC State	56
4	Florida State	65^{OT}
5	Virginia Tech	63
2	North Carolina	83
7	Louisville	70
3	Duke	84
6	Syracuse	72

Semifinals; Friday, March 15; ESPN/Raycom
1	Virginia	59
4	Florida State	69
2	North Carolina	73
3	Duke	74

Championship; Saturday, March 16; ESPN/Raycom
4	Florida State	63
3	Duke	73

== Game summaries ==
=== First round ===
ESPN

March 12
12:00 pm

Report

12 Miami 79, 13 Wake Forest 71
Scoring by half: 34–31, 45–40
Pts: Vasilijevic (21); Rebs: Lawrence (10); Asts: Johnson/Lykes (4)	Pts: Childress/Hoard (16); Rebs: Hoard/Mucius (7); Asts: Childress (5)

Spectrum Center
Charlotte, NC
Referees: Jamie Luckie, Jerry Heater, Mark Schnur

ESPN

March 12
2:00 pm

Report

10 Georgia Tech 71, 15 Notre Dame 78
Scoring by half: 32–52, 39–26
Pts: Wright (25); Rebs: Banks III (11); Asts: Banks III (4)	Pts: Mooney (20); Rebs: Mooney (10); Asts: Hubb (6)

Spectrum Center
Charlotte, NC
Referees: Lee Cassell, Les Jones, AJ Desai

ESPNU

March 12
7:00 pm

Report

11 Boston College 70, 14 Pittsburgh 80
Scoring by half: 21–36, 49–44
Pts: Popovic (21); Rebs: Popovic (9); Asts: Bowman (4)	Pts: McGowens (26); Rebs: Wilson-Frame/Chukwuka (9); Asts: Johnson/Ellison (2)

Spectrum Center
Charlotte, NC
Attendance: 9,677
Referees: Bert Smith, Clarence Armstrong, Tony Henderson

=== Second round ===
ESPN

March 13
12:00 pm

Report

8 NC State 59, 9 Clemson 58
Scoring by half: 26-42, 33-16
Pts: Johnson (23); Rebs: Dorn (12); Asts: Johnson (4)	Pts: Reed (16); Rebs: Reed (10); Asts: Reed (6)

Spectrum Center
Charlotte, NC
Attendance: 19,691
Referees: Roger Ayers, Ted Valentine, Tony Henderson

ESPN

March 13
2:00 pm

Report

5 Virginia Tech 71, 12 Miami 56
Scoring by half: 38-21, 33-35
Pts: Blackshear (19); Rebs: Blackshear (10); Asts: Alexander-Walker (6)	Pts: Lykes (19); Rebs: Lawrence (11); Asts: Lawrence (7)

Spectrum Center
Charlotte, NC
Attendance: 19,691
Referees: Ron Groover, AJ Desai, Clarence Armstrong

ESPN2

March 13
7:00 pm

Report

7 Louisville 75, 15 Notre Dame 53
Scoring by half: 34–25, 41–28
Pts: Nwora (24); Rebs: Sutton (10); Asts: Sutton (4)	Pts: Gibbs (21); Rebs: Mooney (12); Asts: Gibbs (2)

Spectrum Center
Charlotte, NC
Attendance: 11,884
Referees: Brian Dorsey, Raymie Styons, Jerry Heater

ESPN2

March 13
9:00 pm

Report

6 Syracuse 73, 14 Pittsburgh 59
Scoring by half: 30–36, 43–23
Pts: Boeheim (20); Rebs: Chukwu (9); Asts: Boeheim (4)	Pts: Wilson-Frame (24); Rebs: Brown (13); Asts: Johnson (6)

Spectrum Center
Charlotte, NC
Attendance: 11,884
Referees: Bill Covington, Mark Schnur, Les Jones

=== Quarterfinals ===
ESPN

March 14
12:30 pm

Report

1 Virginia 76, 8 NC State 56
Scoring by half: 27–29, 49–27
Pts: Guy (29); Rebs: Key (7); Asts: Jerome (10)	Pts: Johnson (13); Rebs: Dom (7); Asts: Bryce/Daniels (2)

Spectrum Center
Charlotte, NC
Attendance: 19,691
Referees: Jamie Luckie, Bert Smith, AJ Desai

ESPN

March 14
2:30 pm

Report

4 Florida State 65, 5 Virginia Tech 63 (OT)
Scoring by half: 26–24, 30–32 Overtime: 9–7
Pts: Vassell (14); Rebs: Mann (9); Asts: Forrest/Mann (4)	Pts: Alexander-Walker (21); Rebs: Blackshear (9); Asts: Alexander-Walker (4)

Spectrum Center
Charlotte, NC
Attendance: 19,691
Referees: Roger Ayers, Raymie Styons, Jerry Heater

ESPN

March 14
7:00 pm

Report

2 North Carolina 83, 7 Louisville 70
Scoring by half: 45–35, 38–35
Pts: Maye/White (19); Rebs: Maye (9); Asts: White (6)	Pts: Sutton (14); Rebs: Williams (13); Asts: Cunningham (7)

Spectrum Center
Charlotte, NC
Attendance: 19,691
Referees: Ted Valentine, Lee Cassell, Tony Henderson

ESPN

March 14
9:00 pm

Report

3 Duke 84, 6 Syracuse 72
Scoring by half: 34–28, 50–44
Pts: Williamson (29); Rebs: Williamson (14); Asts: Jones (8)	Pts: Howard (28); Rebs: Brissett (7); Asts: Howard (3)

Spectrum Center
Charlotte, NC
Attendance: 19,691
Referees: Ron Groover, Brian Dorsey, Bill Covington

=== Semifinals ===
ESPN

March 15
7:00 pm

Report

1 Virginia 59, 4 Florida State 69
Scoring by half: 31–35, 28–34
Pts: Hunter (13); Rebs: Salt (5); Asts: Guy (4)	Pts: Nichols (14); Rebs: Koumadje (9); Asts: Forrest/Nichols (3)

Spectrum Center
Charlotte, NC
Attendance: 20,116
Referees: Brian Dorsey, Bill Covington, Lee Cassell

ESPN

March 15
9:00 pm

Report

2 North Carolina 73, 3 Duke 74
Scoring by half: 44–44, 29–30
Pts: Johnson (23); Rebs: Maye (13); Asts: White (4)	Pts: Williamson (31); Rebs: Williamson (11); Asts: Barrett (7)

Spectrum Center
Charlotte, NC
Attendance: 20,116
Referees: Roger Ayers, Jamie Luckie, Clarence Armstrong

=== Final ===
ESPN

March 16
8:30 pm

Report

4 Florida State 63, 3 Duke 73
Scoring by half: 36–36, 27–37
Pts: Mann (12); Rebs: Mann (8); Asts: Forrest (3)	Pts: Williamson (21); Rebs: Barrett (9); Asts: Jones (6)

Spectrum Center
Charlotte, NC
Attendance: 19,691
Referees: Ron Groover, Ted Valentine, Bert Smith

== Awards and honors ==
Tournament MVP: Zion Williamson

All-Tournament Teams:

First Team
- RJ Barrett, Duke
- Zion Williamson, Duke
- Mfiondu Kabengele, Florida State
- Cameron Johnson, North Carolina
- Kyle Guy, Virginia

Second Team
- Tre Jones, Duke
- Terance Mann, Florida State
- Luke Maye, North Carolina
- Coby White, North Carolina
- Frank Howard, Syracuse

== See also ==
- 2019 ACC women's basketball tournament
