= 2018–19 Clemson Tigers men's basketball team =

American college basketball season

2018–19 Clemson Tigers men's basketball
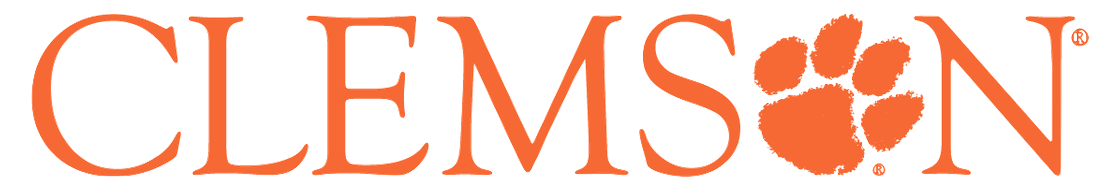

NIT, Second Round
- Conference: Atlantic Coast Conference
- Record: 20–14 (9–9 ACC)
- Head coach: Brad Brownell (9th season)
- Assistant coaches: Antonio Reynolds-Dean (2nd season); Dick Bender (3rd season); Steve Smith (7th season)
- Home arena: Littlejohn Coliseum

2018–19 ACC men's basketball standings
	Conf.				Overall
Team	W		L	PCT	W		L	PCT
No. 2 Virginia	16	–	2	.889	35	–	3	.921
No. 3 North Carolina	16	–	2	.889	29	–	7	.806
No. 1 Duke †	14	–	4	.778	32	–	6	.842
No. 10 Florida State	13	–	5	.722	29	–	8	.784
No. 16 Virginia Tech	12	–	6	.667	26	–	9	.743
Syracuse	10	–	8	.556	20	–	14	.588
Louisville	10	–	8	.556	20	–	14	.588
NC State	9	–	9	.500	24	–	12	.667
Clemson	9	–	9	.500	20	–	14	.588
Georgia Tech	6	–	12	.333	14	–	18	.438
Boston College	5	–	13	.278	14	–	17	.452
Miami (FL)	5	–	13	.278	14	–	18	.438
Wake Forest	4	–	14	.222	11	–	20	.355
Pittsburgh	3	–	15	.167	14	–	19	.424
Notre Dame	3	–	15	.167	14	–	19	.424
† 2019 ACC tournament winner Rankings from AP poll

The 2018–19 Clemson Tigers men's basketball team represented Clemson University during the 2018–19 NCAA Division I men's basketball season. Led by ninth-year head coach Brad Brownell, the Tigers played their home games at Littlejohn Coliseum in Clemson, South Carolina as members of the Atlantic Coast Conference.

They finished the season 20–14, 9–9 in ACC Play to finish a tie for 8th place. They lost in the second round of the ACC tournament to NC State. They received an at-large bid to the National Invitation Tournament where they defeated Wright State in the first round before losing in the second round to Wichita State.

== Previous season ==
The Tigers finished the 2017–18 season 25–10, 11–7 in ACC play to finish in a four-way tie for third place. They defeated Boston College in the quarterfinals of the ACC tournament before losing in the semifinals to Virginia. They received an at-large bid to the NCAA tournament where they defeated New Mexico State and Auburn to advance to the Sweet Sixteen where they lost to Kansas in the Sweet Sixteen. The Tigers 25 wins tied the most in program history and their 11 conference wins are the most in program history.

== Offseason ==
=== Departures ===
Name	Number	Pos.	Height	Weight	Year	Hometown	Reason for departure
Mark Donnal	5	F/C	6'9"	240	Graduate	Monclova, OH	Graduated
Gabe DeVoe	10	G	6'3"	207	Senior	Shelby, NC	Graduated
Isaac Fields	11	G	6'1"	180	Sophomore	Pewee Valley, KY	None Given
Scott Spencer	22	G	6'6"	190	Sophomore	Suffolk, VA	Transferred to LaSalle
Donte Grantham	32	F	6'8"	215	Senior	Martinsburg, WV	Graduated

=== Incoming transfers ===
Name	Number	Pos.	Height	Weight	Year	Hometown	Previous school
Jonathan Baehre	1	F	6'10"	190	RS Sophomore	Hessen, Germany	UNC Asheville
Javan White	35	F	6'10"	230	Graduate Student	Ames, IA	Oral Roberts

=== 2018 recruiting class ===
College recruiting information
Name	Hometown	School	Height	Weight	Commit date
John Newman III; SG	Greensboro, NC	Greensboro Day	6 ft 6 in (1.98 m)	175 lb (79 kg)	Jun 23, 2017
John Newman III; SG	Recruit ratings: Scout: Rivals: 247Sports: ESPN: (80)				
Hunter Tyson; SF	Monroe, NC	Piedmont Community Charter	6 ft 7 in (2.01 m)	180 lb (82 kg)	Sep 25, 2017
Hunter Tyson; SF	Recruit ratings: Scout: Rivals: 247Sports: ESPN: (80)				
Trey Jemison; PF	Birmingham, AL	Hoover High School	6 ft 11 in (2.11 m)	245 lb (111 kg)	Oct 25, 2017
Trey Jemison; PF	Recruit ratings: Scout: Rivals: 247Sports: ESPN: (81)				
Overall recruit ranking: Scout: NA Rivals: 70 ESPN: NA
Note: In many cases, Scout, Rivals, 247Sports, On3, and ESPN may conflict in their listings of height and weight.; In these cases, the average was taken. ESPN grades are on a 100-point scale.; Sources: "Clemson Tigers". ESPN.; "2018 Team Ranking". Rivals.

== Roster ==
2018–19 Clemson Tigers men's basketball team
Players
Coaches

Pos.	#	Name	Height	Weight	Year	Hometown
G	0	Clyde Trapp	6 ft 4 in (1.93 m)	192 lb (87 kg)	So	Columbia, South Carolina
F	1	Jonathan Baehre	6 ft 10 in (2.08 m)	190 lb (86 kg)	RS So	Hessen, Germany
G	2	Marcquise Reed	6 ft 3 in (1.91 m)	189 lb (86 kg)	RS Sr	Landover, Maryland
G	3	Lyles Davis (W)	5 ft 11 in (1.8 m)	160 lb (73 kg)	Sr	Charleston, South Carolina
G	4	Shelton Mitchell	6 ft 3 in (1.91 m)	194 lb (88 kg)	RS Sr	Waxhaw, North Carolina
F	5	Hunter Tyson	6 ft 7 in (2.01 m)	190 lb (86 kg)	Fr	Monroe, North Carolina
G	10	Parker Fox	6 ft 5 in (1.96 m)	175 lb (79 kg)	Fr	Watkinsville, Georgia
F	14	Elijah Thomas	6 ft 9 in (2.06 m)	237 lb (108 kg)	Sr	Lancaster, Texas
G	15	John Newman III	6 ft 5 in (1.96 m)	180 lb (82 kg)	Fr	Greensboro, North Carolina
F	20	Malik William	6 ft 8 in (2.03 m)	226 lb (103 kg)	So	Orlando, Florida
G	21	Anthony Oliver II	6 ft 5 in (1.96 m)	180 lb (82 kg)	RS So	Clemson, South Carolina
F	25	Aamir Simms	6 ft 7 in (2.01 m)	237 lb (108 kg)	So	Palmyra, Virginia
F	35	Javan White	6 ft 10 in (2.08 m)	230 lb (104 kg)	GS	Ames, Iowa
C	55	Trey Jemison	6 ft 11 in (2.11 m)	245 lb (111 kg)	Fr	Birmingham, Alabama

Head coach

- Brad Brownell (DePauw)

Assistant coach(es)

- Antonio Reynolds Dean (Rhode Island)
- Dick Bender (McDaniel)
- Steve Smith (Morgan State)

Legend

- (C) Team captain
- (S) Suspended
- (I) Ineligible
- (W) Walk-on
- Injured
- Current redshirt

Roster
Last update: 7/13/2018

== Schedule and results ==
Date time, TV	Rank^{#}	Opponent^{#}	Result	Record	High points	High rebounds	High assists	Site (attendance) city, state
Exhibition
October 27, 2018*; 5:00 pm	No. 22	at UNC Wilmington; Hurricane Florence Relief	W 78–67	–	20 – Simms	7 – Mitchell	4 – Reed	Trask Coliseum (4,142); Wilmington, NC
November 1, 2018*; 7:00 pm	No. 22	Barton	W 89–80	–	29 – Reed	10 – Skara	3 – Tied	Littlejohn Coliseum; Clemson, SC
Non-conference regular season
November 6, 2018*; 7:00 pm, ACCN Extra	No. 22	The Citadel	W 100–80	1–0	20 – Reed	13 – Reed	4 – Reed	Littlejohn Coliseum (7,491); Clemson, SC
November 9, 2018*; 7:00 pm, ACCN Extra	No. 22	North Carolina Central	W 71–51	2–0	16 – Skara	6 – White	5 – Reed	Littlejohn Coliseum (7,208); Clemson, SC
November 14, 2018*; 7:00 pm, ACCN Extra	No. 19	Sam Houston State; Cayman Islands Classic campus site game	W 74–59	3–0	26 – Reed	8 – Simms	4 – Mitchell	Littlejohn Coliseum (6,227); Clemson, SC
November 19, 2018*; 11:00 am, Stadium	No. 16	vs. Akron; Cayman Islands Classic Quarterfinals	W 72–69	4–0	22 – Mitchell	12 – Thomas	3 – Tied	John Gray Gymnasium (1,050); George Town, Cayman Islands
November 20, 2018*; 2:30 pm, Stadium	No. 16	vs. Georgia; Cayman Islands Classic Semifinals	W 64–49	5–0	24 – Reed	11 – Thomas	3 – Reed	John Gray Gymnasium (786); George Town, Cayman Islands
November 21, 2018*; 7:30 pm, Stadium	No. 16	vs. Creighton; Cayman Islands Classic Final	L 82–87	5–1	27 – Reed	11 – Skara	3 – Tied	John Gray Gymnasium (1,709); George Town, Cayman Islands
November 26, 2018*; 7:00 pm, ESPN2		Nebraska; ACC–Big Ten Challenge	L 66–68	5–2	16 – Thomas	8 – Simms	3 – Tied	Littlejohn Coliseum (6,974); Clemson, SC
December 04, 2018*; 7:00 pm, ACCN Extra		St. Peter's	W 65–60	6–2	21 – Reed	12 – Thomas	3 – Tied	Littlejohn Coliseum (6,254); Clemson, SC
December 8, 2018*; 4:00 pm, ESPN2		vs. No. 22 Mississippi State; Never Forget Tribute Classic	L 71–82	6–3	23 – Simms	8 – Thomas	7 – Mitchell	Prudential Center (7,142); Newark, NJ
December 15, 2018*; 3:00 pm, ACCN Extra		Radford	W 74–66	7–3	20 – Mitchell	9 – Thomas	2 – Tied	Littlejohn Coliseum (7,225); Clemson, SC
December 18, 2018*; 7:00 pm, ACCN Extra		Charleston Southern	W 78–51	8–3	25 – Thomas	14 – Thomas	6 – Mitchell	Littlejohn Coliseum (6,757); Clemson, SC
December 22, 2018*; 2:00 pm, ESPN2		at South Carolina; Rivalry	W 78–68	9–3	20 – Reed	8 – Skara	4 – Reed	Colonial Life Arena (12,269); Columbia, SC
December 30, 2018*; 4:00 pm, ACCRSN		Lipscomb	W 84–67	10–3	26 – Reed	8 – Tied	5 – Reed	Littlejohn Coliseum (7,879); Clemson, SC
ACC regular season
January 5, 2019; 8:00 pm, ESPN		at No. 1 Duke	L 68–87	10–4 (0–1)	15 – Reed	10 – Simms	8 – Reed	Cameron Indoor Stadium (9,314); Durham, NC
January 9, 2019; 8:00 pm, Raycom		at Syracuse	L 53–61	10–5 (0–2)	16 – Reed	7 – Thomas	3 – Tied	Carrier Dome (17,289); Syracuse, NY
January 12, 2019; 12:00 pm, Raycom		No. 4 Virginia	L 43–63	10–6 (0–3)	14 – Reed	12 – Thomas	1 – Tied	Littlejohn Coliseum (9,424); Clemson, SC
January 16, 2019; 9:00 pm, ACCRSN		Georgia Tech	W 72–60	11–6 (1–3)	30 – Reed	9 – Thomas	9 – Mitchell	Littlejohn Coliseum (6,693); Clemson, SC
January 22, 2019; 7:00 pm, ESPNU		at Florida State	L 68–77	11–7 (1–4)	18 – Simms	11 – Thomas	5 – Thomas	Donald L. Tucker Civic Center (8,502); Tallahassee, FL
January 26, 2019; 2:00 pm, Raycom		at No. 21 NC State	L 67–69	11–8 (1–5)	19 – Reed	8 – Reed	2 – Reed	PNC Arena (18,180); Raleigh, NC
January 29, 2019; 9:00 pm, ESPNU		Pittsburgh	W 82–69	12–8 (2–5)	26 – Reed	7 – Skara	5 – Mitchell	Littlejohn Coliseum (6,474); Clemson, SC
February 3, 2019; 12:00 pm, ESPNU		Wake Forest	W 64–37	13–8 (3–5)	23 – Thomas	10 – Thomas	4 – Reed	Littlejohn Coliseum (7,655); Clemson, SC
February 6, 2019; 7:00 pm, ACCRSN		at Georgia Tech	W 65–42	14–8 (4–5)	19 – Reed	8 – Skara	4 – Skara	McCamish Pavilion (5,636); Atlanta, GA
February 9, 2019; 12:00 pm, ESPN2		No. 11 Virginia Tech	W 59–51	15–8 (5–5)	22 – Mitchell	9 – Thomas	4 – Reed	Littlejohn Coliseum (9,000); Clemson, SC
February 13, 2019; 7:00 pm, ESPN2		at Miami	L 64–65	15–9 (5–6)	19 – Reed	9 – Thomas	2 – Mitchell	Watsco Center (6,338); Coral Gables, FL
February 16, 2019; 12:00 pm, ESPN		at No. 16 Louisville	L 55–56	15–10 (5–7)	15 – Thomas	12 – Reed	2 – Tied	KFC Yum! Center (16,043); Louisville, KY
February 19, 2019; 9:00 pm, ESPNU		No. 16 Florida State	L 64–77	15–11 (5–8)	20 – Reed	6 – Thomas	6 – Mitchell	Littlejohn Coliseum (7,549); Clemson, SC
February 23, 2019; 12:00 pm, ACCRSN		Boston College	W 76–66	16–11 (6–8)	31 – Reed	10 – Thomas	4 – Reed	Littlejohn Coliseum (7,810); Clemson, SC
February 27, 2019; 7:00 pm, ACCRSN		at Pittsburgh	W 62–48	17–11 (7–8)	14 – Reed	8 – Thomas	5 – Thomas	Peterson Events Center (6,102); Pittsburgh, PA
March 2, 2019; 6:00 p.m., ESPN		No. 5 North Carolina	L 79–81	17–12 (7–9)	24 – Reed	11 – Thomas	3 – 3 tied	Littlejohn Coliseum (9,248); Clemson, SC
March 6, 2019; 9:00 pm, ESPNU		at Notre Dame	W 64–62	18–12 (8–9)	22 – Reed	8 – Thomas	4 – Skara	Joyce Center (8,158); South Bend, IN
March 9, 2019; 12:00 pm, CBS		Syracuse	W 67–55	19–12 (9–9)	24 – Reed	11 – Thomas	5 – Simms	Littlejohn Coliseum (8,620); Clemson, SC
ACC tournament
March 13, 2019; 12:00 pm, ESPN	(9)	vs. (8) NC State; Second Round	L 58–59	19–13	16 – Reed	10 – Reed	6 – Reed	Spectrum Center; Charlotte, NC
NIT
March 19, 2019*; 7:00 pm, ESPNU	(2)	(7) Wright State; First Round – Indiana Bracket	W 75–69	20–13	24 – Reed	9 – Skara	4 – Reed	Littlejohn Coliseum (1,718); Clemson, SC
March 24, 2019*; 2:00 pm, ESPN	(2)	(6) Wichita State; Second Round – Indiana Bracket	L 55–63	20–14	18 – Reed	8 – Thomas	1 – Tied	Littlejohn Coliseum (3,266); Clemson, SC
*Non-conference game. ^{#}Rankings from AP Poll. (#) Tournament seedings in parentheses. All times are in Eastern Time.

== Rankings ==
Ranking movements Legend: ██ Increase in ranking ██ Decrease in ranking — = Not ranked RV = Received votes
	Week																			
Poll	Pre	1	2	3	4	5	6	7	8	9	10	11	12	13	14	15	16	17	18	Final
AP	22	19	16	RV	RV	—	—									RV	—		RV	Not released
Coaches	23	23^	16	24	RV	—	—													

*AP does not release post-NCAA tournament rankings
^Coaches did not release a Week 2 poll.

== See also ==
- 2018–19 Clemson Tigers women's basketball team
