= 2018–19 Pittsburgh Panthers men's basketball team =

American college basketball season

2018–19 Pittsburgh Panthers men's basketball

Barclays Center Classic Champions
- Conference: Atlantic Coast Conference
- Record: 14–19 (3–15 ACC)
- Head coach: Jeff Capel (1st season)
- Assistant coaches: Tim O'Toole (1st season); Milan Brown (1st season); Jason Capel (1st season)
- Home arena: Petersen Events Center (Capacity: 12,508)

2018–19 ACC men's basketball standings
	Conf.				Overall
Team	W		L	PCT	W		L	PCT
No. 2 Virginia	16	–	2	.889	35	–	3	.921
No. 3 North Carolina	16	–	2	.889	29	–	7	.806
No. 1 Duke †	14	–	4	.778	32	–	6	.842
No. 10 Florida State	13	–	5	.722	29	–	8	.784
No. 16 Virginia Tech	12	–	6	.667	26	–	9	.743
Syracuse	10	–	8	.556	20	–	14	.588
Louisville	10	–	8	.556	20	–	14	.588
NC State	9	–	9	.500	24	–	12	.667
Clemson	9	–	9	.500	20	–	14	.588
Georgia Tech	6	–	12	.333	14	–	18	.438
Boston College	5	–	13	.278	14	–	17	.452
Miami (FL)	5	–	13	.278	14	–	18	.438
Wake Forest	4	–	14	.222	11	–	20	.355
Pittsburgh	3	–	15	.167	14	–	19	.424
Notre Dame	3	–	15	.167	14	–	19	.424
† 2019 ACC tournament winner Rankings from AP poll

The 2018–19 Pittsburgh Panthers men's basketball team represented the University of Pittsburgh during the 2018–19 NCAA Division I men's basketball season. The Panthers were led by first-year head coach Jeff Capel and played their home games at the Petersen Events Center in Pittsburgh, Pennsylvania as members of the Atlantic Coast Conference.

== Previous season ==
The Panthers finished the 2017–18 season 8–24 overall and 0–18 in ACC play, finishing dead last in the conference and losing in the first round of the ACC tournament to Notre Dame. On March 8, 2018, Pitt fired head coach Kevin Stallings. On March 27, Pitt hired Duke assistant coach Jeff Capel as head coach.

== Offseason ==
=== Departures ===
Name	Number	Pos.	Height	Weight	Year	Hometown	Reason for departure
Parker Stewart	1	G	6'5"	195	Freshman	Union City, TN	UT Martin
Jonathan Milligan	2	G	6'2"	170	Senior	Orlando, FL	Graduated
Ryan Luther	4	F	6'9"	225	Senior	Gibsonia, PA	Arizona
Marcus Carr	5	G	6'1"	185	Freshman	Toronto, ON	Minnesota
Monty Boykins	33	G	6'5"	195	Senior	West Chester, OH	Graduated
Zach Smith	35	G	6'3"	200	RS Senior	Smethport, PA	Graduated

=== Incoming transfers ===
Name	Number	Pos.	Height	Weight	Year	Hometown	Previous School
Sidy N'Dir	11	G	6'2"	190	Graduate Student	Cosne-Cours-sur-Loire, France	New Mexico State

=== 2018 recruiting class ===
College recruiting information
Name	Hometown	School	Height	Weight	Commit date
Xavier Johnson #34 PG	Woodbridge, VA	Bishop O'Connell High School	6 ft 1 in (1.85 m)	175 lb (79 kg)	Apr 28, 2018
Xavier Johnson #34 PG	Recruit ratings: Scout: Rivals: 247Sports: ESPN:				
Trey McGowens #46 SG	Chatham, VA	Hargrave Military Academy	6 ft 3 in (1.91 m)	175 lb (79 kg)	Apr 24, 2018
Trey McGowens #46 SG	Recruit ratings: Scout: Rivals: 247Sports: ESPN:				
Au'Diese Toney; SG	Fayetteville, NC	Trinity Christian School	6 ft 6 in (1.98 m)	190 lb (86 kg)	Jun 2, 2018
Au'Diese Toney; SG	Recruit ratings: Scout: Rivals: 247Sports: ESPN:				
Overall recruit ranking:
Note: In many cases, Scout, Rivals, 247Sports, On3, and ESPN may conflict in their listings of height and weight.; In these cases, the average was taken. ESPN grades are on a 100-point scale.; Sources: "2018 Team Ranking". Rivals.

== Roster ==
2018–19 Pittsburgh Panthers men's basketball team
Players
Coaches

Pos.	#	Name	Height	Weight	Year	Previous school	Hometown
G/F	0	Shamiel Stevenson	6 ft 6 in (1.98 m)	230 lb (104 kg)	So	Hillcrest Prep (AZ)	Toronto, ON
G	1	Xavier Johnson	6 ft 3 in (1.91 m)	170 lb (77 kg)	Fr	Bishop O'Connell	Woodbridge, VA
G	2	Trey McGowens	6 ft 3 in (1.91 m)	175 lb (79 kg)	Fr	Hargrave Military Academy (VA)	Piedmont, SC
G	3	Malik Ellison	6 ft 6 in (1.98 m)	215 lb (98 kg)	RS Jr	Life Center Academy/St. John's	Voorhees, NJ
G/F	4	Jared Wilson-Frame	6 ft 5 in (1.96 m)	220 lb (100 kg)	Sr	Windsor/Northwest Florida State	Hartford, CT
G	5	Au'Diese Toney	6 ft 6 in (1.98 m)	190 lb (86 kg)	Fr	Trinity Christian Academy (NC)	Huntsville, AL
G	11	Sidy N'Dir	6 ft 2 in (1.88 m)	190 lb (86 kg)	GS	West Oaks Academy (FL)/New Mexico State	Cosne-Cours-sur-Loire, France
G	12	Joe Mascaro (W)	5 ft 10 in (1.78 m)	170 lb (77 kg)	Sr	Bethel Park	Pittsburgh, PA
G	13	Khameron Davis	6 ft 4 in (1.93 m)	195 lb (88 kg)	So	Forest Trail Academy (NC)	Highlands Ranch, CO
G	14	Curtis Aiken Jr. (W)	6 ft 1 in (1.85 m)	180 lb (82 kg)	Fr	North Allegheny	Wexford, PA
F/C	15	Kene Chukwuka	6 ft 9 in (2.06 m)	215 lb (98 kg)	Jr	Söderslättsgymnasiet/New Mexico JUCO	Stockholm, Sweden
F/C	21	Terrell Brown	6 ft 10 in (2.08 m)	240 lb (109 kg)	So	Tilton School (NH)	Providence, RI
G	22	Anthony Starzynski (W)	6 ft 3 in (1.91 m)	180 lb (82 kg)	Jr	Baldwin	Pittsburgh, PA
F	24	Samson George	6 ft 7 in (2.01 m)	220 lb (100 kg)	So	First Love Christian Academy (PA)/Iona	Minna, Nigeria
C	42	Peace Ilegomah	6 ft 9 in (2.06 m)	235 lb (107 kg)	So	Montverde Academy (FL)	Benin City, Nigeria

Head coach

- Jeff Capel (Duke)

Assistant coach(es)

- Tim O'Toole (Fairfield)
- Milan Brown (Howard)
- Jason Capel (North Carolina)

Legend

- (C) Team captain
- (S) Suspended
- (I) Ineligible
- (W) Walk-on
- Injured
- Current redshirt

Roster

== Schedule and results ==
Date time, TV	Rank^{#}	Opponent^{#}	Result	Record	High points	High rebounds	High assists	Site (attendance) city, state
Exhibition
November 1, 2018*; 7:00 pm		Pitt-Johnstown	W 78–59	–	14 – Tied	6 – Chukwuka	6 – N'Dir	Petersen Events Center (3,194); Pittsburgh, PA
Non-conference regular season
November 6, 2018*; 7:00 pm, ACCN Extra		Youngstown State	W 69–53	1–0	17 – McGowens	9 – Toney	6 – Johnson	Petersen Events Center (4,729); Pittsburgh, PA
November 9, 2018*; 7:00 pm, ACCN Extra		VMI	W 94–55	2–0	20 – Wilson-Frame	8 – Toney	10 – Johnson	Petersen Events Center (4,321); Pittsburgh, PA
November 12, 2018*; 7:00 pm, ACCN Extra		Troy; Barclays Center Classic	W 84–75	3–0	24 – Wilson-Frame	7 – Johnson	9 – Johnson	Petersen Events Center (3,285); Pittsburgh, PA
November 15, 2018*; 7:00 pm, ACCN Extra		Central Arkansas; Barclays Center Classic	W 97–71	4–0	20 – Wilson-Frame	8 – Brown	4 – Ellison	Petersen Events Center (2,578); Pittsburgh, PA
November 17, 2018*; 12:00 pm, ACCN Extra		North Alabama; Barclays Center Classic	W 71–66	5–0	23 – Johnson	8 – Toney	3 – Tied	Petersen Events Center (3,540); Pittsburgh, PA
November 21, 2018*; 12:00 pm, ACCN Extra		vs. Saint Louis; Barclays Center Classic	W 75–73	6–0	20 – Johnson	8 – Tied	3 – Tied	Barclays Center (355); Brooklyn, NY
November 27, 2018*; 9:00 pm, ESPNU		at No. 14 Iowa; ACC–Big Ten Challenge	L 68–69	6–1	18 – Johnson	6 – Brown	6 – Johnson	Carver–Hawkeye Arena (10,158); Iowa City, IA
November 30, 2018*; 7:00 pm, ACCN Extra		vs. Duquesne; The City Game	W 74–53	7–1	14 – McGowens	9 – Toney	5 – Johnson	PPG Paints Arena (12,246); Pittsburgh, PA
December 3, 2018*; 7:00 pm, ACCN Extra		Niagara	L 70–71	7–2	19 – Johnson	9 – Toney	6 – Wilson-Frame	Petersen Events Center (3,468); Pittsburgh, PA
December 8, 2018*; 12:00 pm, ESPN2		at West Virginia; Backyard Brawl	L 59–69	7–3	21 – Johnson	6 – Tied	2 – Tied	WVU Coliseum (13,670); Morgantown, WV
December 15, 2018*; 2:00 pm, ACCRSN		Maryland Eastern Shore	W 78–43	8–3	12 – Johnson	11 – Wilson-Frame	4 – Johnson	Petersen Events Center (4,472); Pittsburgh, PA
December 20, 2018*; 7:00 pm, ACCN Extra		New Orleans	W 99–57	9–3	24 – McGowens	8 – Toney	6 – Johnson	Petersen Events Center (3,988); Pittsburgh, PA
December 29, 2018*; 4:00 pm, ACCN Extra		Colgate	W 68–54	10–3	16 – McGowens	7 – Wilson-Frame	6 – Johnson	Petersen Events Center (6,182); Pittsburgh, PA
ACC regular season
January 5, 2019; 12:00 pm, Raycom		No. 15 North Carolina	L 60–85	10–4 (0–1)	17 – McGowens	9 – Brown	2 – Tied	Petersen Events Center (12,508); Pittsburgh, PA
January 9, 2019; 8:00 pm, Raycom		Louisville	W 89–86 ^{OT}	11–4 (1–1)	33 – McGowens	6 – McGowens	10 – Johnson	Petersen Events Center (6,290); Pittsburgh, PA
January 12, 2019; 12:00 pm, Raycom		at No. 15 NC State	L 80–86	11–5 (1–2)	25 – Johnson	8 – Brown	7 – McGowens	PNC Arena (17,695); Raleigh, NC
January 14, 2019; 7:00 pm, ESPNU		No. 11 Florida State	W 75–62	12–5 (2–2)	30 – McGowens	8 – Toney	4 – McGowens	Petersen Events Center (6,780); Pittsburgh, PA
January 19, 2019; 2:00 pm, ACCRSN		at Syracuse	L 63–74	12–6 (2–3)	19 – Wilson-Frame	9 – Toney	3 – Johnson	Carrier Dome (24,466); Syracuse, NY
January 22, 2019; 9:00 pm, ESPN		No. 2 Duke	L 64–79	12–7 (2–4)	14 – McGowens	6 – Brown	2 – N'Dir	Petersen Events Center (12,881); Pittsburgh, PA
January 26, 2019; 2:00 pm, Raycom		at No. 23 Louisville	L 51–66	12–8 (2–5)	14 – Wilson-Frame	8 – Davis	4 – Johnson	KFC Yum! Center (16,929); Louisville, KY
January 29, 2019; 9:00 pm, ESPNU		at Clemson	L 69–82	12–9 (2–6)	30 – Johnson	4 – 5 tied	1 – Tied	Littlejohn Coliseum (6,474); Clemson, SC
February 2, 2019; 6:00 pm, ESPN2		Syracuse	L 56–65	12–10 (2–7)	16 – Brown	11 – Ellison	6 – Johnson	Petersen Events Center (12,508); Pittsburgh, PA
February 5, 2019; 7:00 pm, ESPNU		at Wake Forest	L 76–78 ^{OT}	12–11 (2–8)	23 – Johnson	8 – Ellison	9 – Johnson	LJVM Coliseum (5,170); Winston-Salem, NC
February 9, 2019; 2:00 pm, Raycom		NC State	L 76–79	12–12 (2–9)	17 – Johnson	7 – Toney	6 – N'Dir	Petersen Events Center (8,950); Pittsburgh, PA
February 12, 2019; 7:00 pm, ESPNU		at Boston College	L 57–66	12–13 (2–10)	12 – Wilson-Frame	7 – 3 tied	7 – Johnson	Conte Forum (3,463); Chestnut Hill, MA
February 16, 2019; 4:30 pm, ACCRSN		No. 22 Virginia Tech	L 64–70	12–14 (2–11)	18 – Johnson	6 – N'Dir	5 – Johnson	Petersen Events Center (10,289); Pittsburgh, PA
February 20, 2019; 9:00 pm, ACCRSN		at Georgia Tech	L 65–73	12–15 (2–12)	19 – Wilson-Frame	10 – Toney	6 – Johnson	McCamish Pavilion (4,959); Atlanta, GA
February 27, 2019; 7:00 pm, ACCRSN		Clemson	L 48–62	12–16 (2–13)	14 – Johnson	6 – Wilson-Frame	3 – McGowens	Petersen Events Center (6,102); Pittsburgh, PA
March 2, 2019; 2:00 pm, Raycom		at No. 2 Virginia	L 49–73	12–17 (2–14)	17 – Wilson-Frame	7 – Toney	4 – Wilson-Frame	John Paul Jones Arena (13,452); Charlottesville, VA
March 5, 2019; 8:00 pm, Raycom		at Miami (FL)	L 63–76	12–18 (2–15)	18 – Wilson-Frame	6 – Johnson	5 – Johnson	Watsco Center (6,373); Coral Gables, FL
March 9, 2019; 12:00 pm, Raycom		Notre Dame	W 56–53	13–18 (3–15)	16 – McGowens	6 – Chukwuka	6 – Johnson	Petersen Events Center (8,602); Pittsburgh, PA
ACC Tournament
March 12, 2019; 7:00 pm, ESPNU	(14)	vs. (11) Boston College; First Round	W 80–70	14–18	26 – McGowens	9 – Tied	2 – Tied	Spectrum Center (9,677); Charlotte, NC
March 13, 2019; 9:00 pm, ESPN2	(14)	vs. (6) Syracuse; Second Round	L 59–73	14–19	24 – Wilson-Frame	13 – Brown	6 – Johnson	Spectrum Center (19,691); Charlotte, NC
*Non-conference game. ^{#}Rankings from AP Poll. (#) Tournament seedings in parentheses. All times are in Eastern Time.
