= 2018–19 Boston College Eagles men's basketball team =

American college basketball season

2018–19 Boston College Eagles men's basketball

Fort Myers Tip-Off champions
- Conference: Atlantic Coast Conference
- Record: 14–17 (5–13 ACC)
- Head coach: Jim Christian (5th season)
- Assistant coaches: Scott Spinelli; Bill Wuczynski; Chris Cheeks
- Home arena: Conte Forum

2018–19 ACC men's basketball standings
	Conf.				Overall
Team	W		L	PCT	W		L	PCT
No. 2 Virginia	16	–	2	.889	35	–	3	.921
No. 3 North Carolina	16	–	2	.889	29	–	7	.806
No. 1 Duke †	14	–	4	.778	32	–	6	.842
No. 10 Florida State	13	–	5	.722	29	–	8	.784
No. 16 Virginia Tech	12	–	6	.667	26	–	9	.743
Syracuse	10	–	8	.556	20	–	14	.588
Louisville	10	–	8	.556	20	–	14	.588
NC State	9	–	9	.500	24	–	12	.667
Clemson	9	–	9	.500	20	–	14	.588
Georgia Tech	6	–	12	.333	14	–	18	.438
Boston College	5	–	13	.278	14	–	17	.452
Miami (FL)	5	–	13	.278	14	–	18	.438
Wake Forest	4	–	14	.222	11	–	20	.355
Pittsburgh	3	–	15	.167	14	–	19	.424
Notre Dame	3	–	15	.167	14	–	19	.424
† 2019 ACC tournament winner Rankings from AP poll

The 2018–19 Boston College Eagles men's basketball team represented Boston College during the 2018–19 NCAA Division I men's basketball season. The Eagles, led by fifth-year head coach Jim Christian, played their home games at the Conte Forum as members of the Atlantic Coast Conference.

== Previous season ==
The Eagles finished the 2017–18 season finished the season 19–16, 7–11 in ACC play to finish in 12th place. In the ACC tournament, they defeated Georgia Tech and NC State before losing in the quarterfinals to Clemson. They received an invitation to the National Invitation Tournament where they lost in the first round to Western Kentucky.

== Offseason ==
=== Departures ===
Name	Number	Pos.	Height	Weight	Year	Hometown	Reason for departure
Jerome Robinson	1	G	6'5"	191	Junior	Raleigh, NC	Declare for 2018 NBA draft
Mike Sagay	3	F	6'7"	208	Sophomore	Bloomfield, CT	Transferred to IUPUI
Deontae Hawkins	23	F	6'8"	220	RS Senior	Dayton, OH	Graduated

=== Incoming transfers ===
Name	Number	Pos.	Height	Weight	Year	Hometown	Previous School
Jared Hamilton	3	G	6'4"	190	RS Junior	Charlotte, NC	Georgia Southern

- Under NCAA transfer rules, Jared Hamilton has to sit out until December and will be eligible to start in December during the 2018–19 season. Jared Hamilton has one and a half years of remaining eligibility.

=== Recruiting class of 2018 ===
College recruiting information
Name	Hometown	School	Height	Weight	Commit date
Wynston Tabbs #51 SG	Leonardtown, MD	Saint Mary's Ryken	6 ft 3 in (1.91 m)	189 lb (86 kg)	Aug 11, 2017
Wynston Tabbs #51 SG	Recruit ratings: Scout: Rivals: 247Sports: ESPN:				
Jairus Hamilton #14 SF	Concord, NC	Cannon School	6 ft 8 in (2.03 m)	210 lb (95 kg)	Jan 11, 2018
Jairus Hamilton #14 SF	Recruit ratings: Scout: Rivals: 247Sports: ESPN:				
Chris Herren, Jr. PG	Marion, MA	Tabor Academy	6 ft 3 in (1.91 m)	175 lb (79 kg)	
Chris Herren, Jr. PG	Recruit ratings: Scout: Rivals: 247Sports: ESPN:				
Overall recruit ranking:
Note: In many cases, Scout, Rivals, 247Sports, On3, and ESPN may conflict in their listings of height and weight.; In these cases, the average was taken. ESPN grades are on a 100-point scale.; Sources: "2018 Team Ranking". Rivals.

== Roster ==
2018–19 Boston College Eagles men's basketball team
Players
Coaches

Pos.	#	Name	Height	Weight	Year	Previous school	Hometown
G	0	Ky Bowman	6 ft 1 in (1.85 m)	188 lb (85 kg)	Jr	Havelock High School	Havelock, North Carolina
F	1	Jairus Hamilton	6 ft 8 in (2.03 m)	234 lb (106 kg)	Fr	Cannon School	Charlotte, North Carolina
G	2	Avery Wilson	6 ft 3 in (1.91 m)	219 lb (99 kg)	So	Forest Park High School	Forest Park, GA
G	3	Jared Hamilton	6 ft 4 in (1.93 m)	203 lb (92 kg)	RS Jr	Georgia Southern	Charlotte, North Carolina
G	4	Chris Herren Jr.	6 ft 3 in (1.91 m)	174 lb (79 kg)	Fr	Tabor Academy	Portsmouth, Rhode Island
G	5	Wynston Tabbs	6 ft 2 in (1.88 m)	193 lb (88 kg)	Fr	St. Mary's Ryken High School	Leonardtown, Maryland
F	10	Ervins Meznieks	6 ft 7 in (2.01 m)	228 lb (103 kg)	Sr	Riga Teika Secondary School	Riga, Latvia
F	11	Vin Baker Jr.	6 ft 7 in (2.01 m)	184 lb (83 kg)	So	Hamden Hall Country Day School	Old Saybrook, Connecticut
F/C	12	John Carlos Reyes	6 ft 10 in (2.08 m)	214 lb (97 kg)	RS Jr	Sound Doctrine Christian Academy	Lawrenceville, Georgia
F	13	Luka Kraljević	6 ft 10 in (2.08 m)	228 lb (103 kg)	So	Don Bosco Prep	Domžale, Slovenia
G/F	20	Gordon Gehan (W)	6 ft 5 in (1.96 m)	220 lb (100 kg)	Sr	Episcopal School of Dallas	Dallas, Texas
F	21	Nik Popovic	6 ft 11 in (2.11 m)	253 lb (115 kg)	Jr	Sagemont School	Banja Luka, Bosnia and Herzegovina
G	22	Matt DiLuccio (W)	5 ft 11 in (1.8 m)	180 lb (82 kg)	Jr	South Side High School	Rockville Centre, New York
F/C	24	Will Jackowitz (W)	6 ft 8 in (2.03 m)	205 lb (93 kg)	So	Wellesley High School	Wellesley, Massachusetts
G	25	Jordan Chatman	6 ft 5 in (1.96 m)	200 lb (91 kg)	RS Sr	BYU	Vancouver, Washington
G	30	Sam Holtze (W)	5 ft 10 in (1.78 m)	150 lb (68 kg)	So	Notre Dame	Manhattan Beach, California
F	41	Steffon Mitchell	6 ft 8 in (2.03 m)	220 lb (100 kg)	So	Sunrise Christian Academy	Shakopee, Minnesota
G/F	55	Mac Bohuny (W)	6 ft 4 in (1.93 m)	175 lb (79 kg)	So	Stony Brook School	Ridgewood, New Jersey

Head coach

- Jim Christian (Rhode Island)

Assistant coach(es)

- Scott Spinelli (Boston University)
- Bill Wuczynski (UNLV)
- Chris Cheeks (VCU)

Legend

- (C) Team captain
- (S) Suspended
- (I) Ineligible
- (W) Walk-on
- Injured
- Current redshirt

Roster

== Schedule and results ==
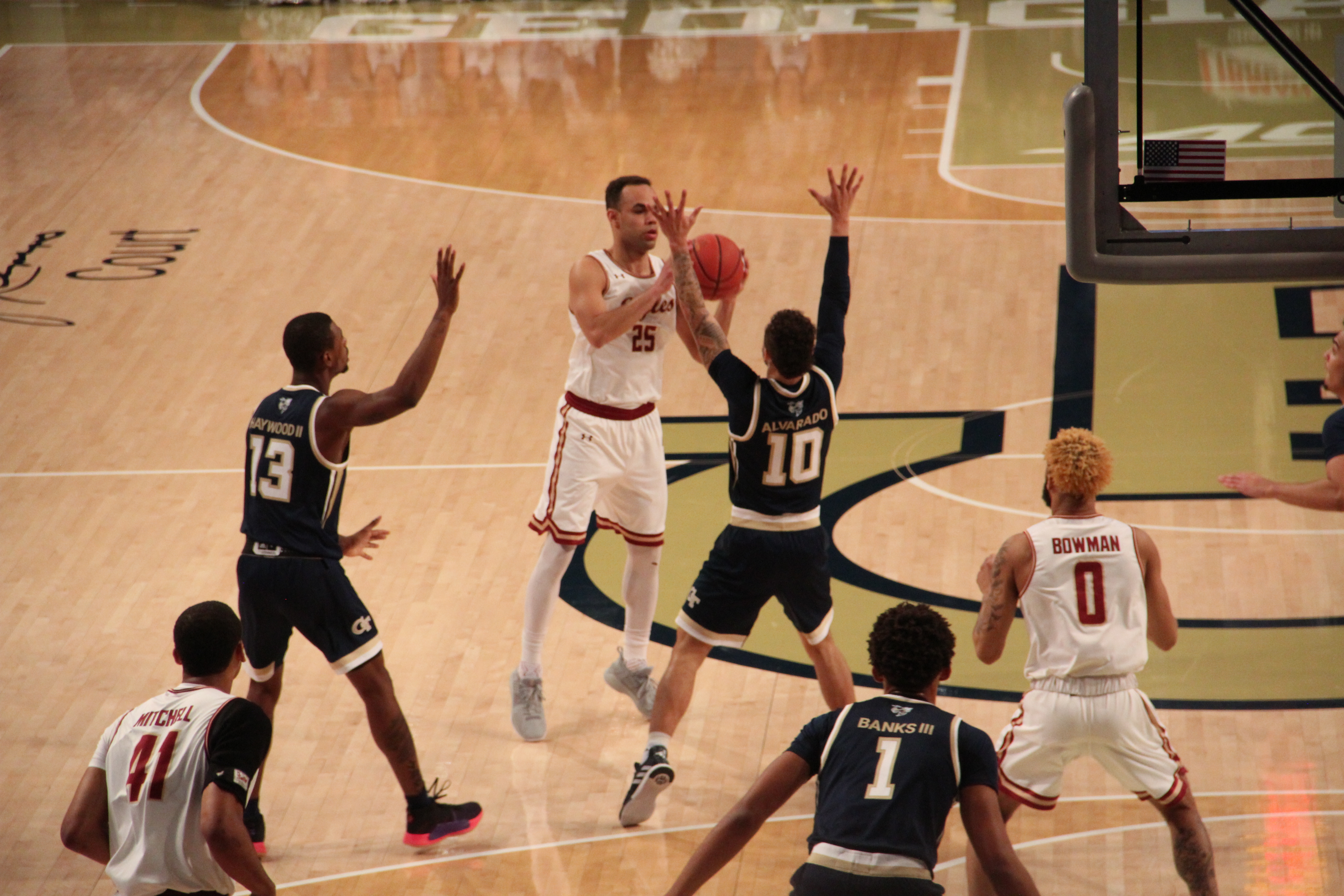
Boston College in a game against Georgia Tech

Date time, TV	Rank^{#}	Opponent^{#}	Result	Record	High points	High rebounds	High assists	Site (attendance) city, state
Exhibition
October 27, 2018*; 12:00 pm		Seton Hall; Charity exhibition	L 62–76	–	20 – Bowman	9 – Hamilton	4 – Bowman	Conte Forum; Chestnut Hill, MA
Non-conference regular season
November 6, 2018*; 7:00 pm, ACCN Extra		Milwaukee	W 73–53	1–0	19 – Bowman	14 – Mitchell	4 – Bowman	Conte Forum (3,763); Chestnut Hill, MA
November 11, 2018*; 1:00 pm, ACCN Extra		St. Francis Brooklyn; Fort Myers Tip-Off	W 74–69	2–0	26 – Bowman	10 – Tied	4 – Bowman	Conte Forum (3,974); Chestnut Hill, MA
November 14, 2018*; 7:00 pm, ACCN Extra		IUPUI; Fort Myers Tip-Off	L 69–76	2–1	20 – Chatman	9 – Bowman	3 – Tied	Conte Forum (3,244); Chestnut Hill, MA
November 19, 2018*; 9:00 pm, FS1		vs. Wyoming; Fort Myers Tip-Off semifinals	W 88–76	3–1	38 – Bowman	11 – Mitchell	5 – Chatman	Suncoast Credit Union Arena (975); Fort Myers, FL
November 21, 2018*; 7:30 pm, FS1		vs. Loyola–Chicago; Fort Myers Tip-Off championship	W 78–66	4–1	20 – Chatman	7 – Tabbs	5 – Bowman	Suncoast Credit Union Arena (2,750); Fort Myers, FL
November 26, 2018*; 9:00 pm, ESPN2		Minnesota; ACC–Big Ten Challenge	W 68–56	5–1	18 – Popovic	13 – Mitchell	5 – Tabbs	Conte Forum (4,389); Chestnut Hill, MA
November 29, 2018*; 7:00 pm, ACCN Extra		Sacred Heart	W 81–73	6–1	28 – Tabbs	9 – Hamilton	6 – Bowman	Conte Forum (3,410); Chestnut Hill, MA
December 4, 2018*; 7:00 pm, ESPN2		Providence	L 95–100 ^{OT}	6–2	28 – Chatman	11 – Mitchell	4 – Tied	Conte Forum (5,453); Chestnut Hill, MA
December 8, 2018*; 6:00 pm, SECN		at Texas A&M	Cancelled					Reed Arena; College Station, TX
December 12, 2018*; 7:00 pm, ACCN Extra		Columbia	W 82–73	7–2	24 – Bowman	14 – Popovic	5 – Bowman	Conte Forum (3,295); Chestnut Hill, MA
December 16, 2018*; 1:00 pm, ACCN Extra		Fairfield	W 77–67	8–2	22 – Herren Jr.	12 – Bowman	6 – Tabbs	Conte Forum (4,664); Chestnut Hill, MA
December 22, 2018*; 3:30 pm, FS1		at DePaul	W 65–62	9–2	19 – Popovic	9 – Mitchell	4 – Tabbs	Wintrust Arena (4,741); Chicago, IL
December 31, 2018*; 1:00 pm, ACCN Extra		Hartford	L 78–79 ^{OT}	9–3	44 – Bowman	10 – Tied	4 – Tied	Conte Forum (5,472); Chestnut Hill, MA
ACC Regular Season
January 5, 2019; 12:00 pm, ACCRSN		at No. 10 Virginia Tech	L 66–77	9–4 (0–1)	18 – Chatman	7 – Bowman	5 – Bowman	Cassell Coliseum (7,009); Blacskburg, VA
January 9, 2019; 9:00 pm, ESPNU		No. 4 Virginia	L 56–83	9–5 (0–2)	16 – Popovic	6 – Hamilton	2 – Tied	Conte Forum (5,738); Chestnut Hill, MA
January 12, 2019; 12:00 pm, ACCRSN		at Notre Dame	L 66–69	9–6 (0–3)	24 – Bowman	16 – Bowman	3 – Hamilton	Edmund P. Joyce Center (8,442); South Bend, IN
January 16, 2019; 7:00 pm, ACCRSN		at Louisville	L 70–80	9–7 (0–4)	21 – Chatman	13 – Bowman	7 – Bowman	KFC Yum! Center (14,898); Louisville, KY
January 20, 2019; 12:00 pm, ESPNU		No. 11 Florida State	W 87–82	10–7 (1–4)	37 – Bowman	9 – Bowman	4 – Tied	Conte Forum (5,533); Chestnut Hill, MA
January 26, 2019; 4:00 pm, ACCRSN		at Wake Forest	W 65–61	11–7 (2–4)	21 – Popovic	11 – Popovic	7 – Mitchell	LJVM Coliseum (9,487); Winston-Salem, NC
January 30, 2019; 8:00 pm, Raycom		Syracuse	L 71–77	11–8 (2–5)	21 – Tied	9 – Mitchell	4 – Tied	Conte Forum (6,862); Chestnut Hill, MA
February 2, 2019; 2:00 pm, ACCRSN		Notre Dame	L 73–79	11–9 (2–6)	25 – Bowman	10 – Bowman	5 – Mitchell	Conte Forum (8,606); Chestnut Hill, MA
February 5, 2019; 7:00 pm, ESPN		at No. 2 Duke	L 55–80	11–10 (2–7)	16 – Chatman	8 – Popovic	6 – Bowman	Cameron Indoor Stadium (9,314); Durham, NC
February 9, 2019; 2:00 pm, Raycom		at Syracuse	L 56–67	11–11 (2–8)	21 – Bowman	7 – Bowman	2 – 4 tied	Carrier Dome (26,011); Syracuse, NY
February 12, 2019; 7:00 pm, ESPNU		Pittsburgh	W 66–57	12–11 (3–8)	14 – Bowman	8 – 3 tied	7 – Bowman	Conte Forum (3,463); Chestnut Hill, MA
February 17, 2019; 6:00 pm, ESPNU		Miami (FL)	W 64–57	13–11 (4–8)	17 – Chatman	14 – Popovic	8 – Bowman	Conte Forum (7,251); Chestnut Hill, MA
February 20, 2019; 7:00 pm, ACCRSN		at NC State	L 80–89 ^{OT}	13–12 (4–9)	18 – Popovic	18 – Mitchell	5 – Bowman	PNC Arena (14,435); Raleigh, NC
February 23, 2019; 12:00 pm, ACCRSN		at Clemson	L 66–76	13–13 (4–10)	17 – Tied	6 – Hamilton	3 – Popovic	Littlejohn Coliseum (7,810); Clemson, SC
February 27, 2019; 9:00 pm, ACCRSN		Louisville	W 66–59	14–13 (5–10)	25 – Bowman	12 – Bowman	8 – Bowman	Conte Forum (4,250); Chestnut Hill, MA
March 3, 2019; 6:00 pm, ESPNU		at Georgia Tech	L 78–81 ^{OT}	14–14 (5–11)	24 – Popovic	10 – Mitchell	7 – Mitchell	McCamish Pavilion (6,285); Atlanta, GA
March 5, 2019; 8:00 pm, Raycom		No. 3 North Carolina	L 66–79	14–15 (5–12)	23 – Bowman	9 – Bowman	5 – Chatman	Conte Forum (7,731); Chestnut Hill, MA
March 9, 2019; 2:00 pm, ACCRSN		NC State	W 73–47	14–16 (5–13)	14 – Bowman	12 – Mitchell	4 – Bowman	Conte Forum (7,279); Chestnut Hill, MA
ACC tournament
March 12, 2019; 7:00 pm, ESPNU	(11)	vs. (14) Pittsburgh; First Round	L 70–80	14–17	21 – Popovic	9 – Popovic	4 – Bowman	Spectrum Center (9,677); Charlotte, NC
*Non-conference game. ^{#}Rankings from AP Poll. (#) Tournament seedings in parentheses. All times are in Eastern Time.

Source.

== See also ==
- 2018–19 Boston College Eagles women's basketball team
