= 2018–19 Miami Hurricanes men's basketball team =

American college basketball season

2018–19 Miami Hurricanes men's basketball
- Conference: Atlantic Coast Conference
- Record: 14–18 (5–13 ACC)
- Head coach: Jim Larrañaga (8th season)
- Assistant coaches: Chris Caputo; Adam Fisher; Pooh Williamson
- Home arena: Watsco Center

2018–19 ACC men's basketball standings
	Conf.				Overall
Team	W		L	PCT	W		L	PCT
No. 2 Virginia	16	–	2	.889	35	–	3	.921
No. 3 North Carolina	16	–	2	.889	29	–	7	.806
No. 1 Duke †	14	–	4	.778	32	–	6	.842
No. 10 Florida State	13	–	5	.722	29	–	8	.784
No. 16 Virginia Tech	12	–	6	.667	26	–	9	.743
Syracuse	10	–	8	.556	20	–	14	.588
Louisville	10	–	8	.556	20	–	14	.588
NC State	9	–	9	.500	24	–	12	.667
Clemson	9	–	9	.500	20	–	14	.588
Georgia Tech	6	–	12	.333	14	–	18	.438
Boston College	5	–	13	.278	14	–	17	.452
Miami (FL)	5	–	13	.278	14	–	18	.438
Wake Forest	4	–	14	.222	11	–	20	.355
Pittsburgh	3	–	15	.167	14	–	19	.424
Notre Dame	3	–	15	.167	14	–	19	.424
† 2019 ACC tournament winner Rankings from AP poll

The 2018–19 Miami Hurricanes men's basketball team represented the University of Miami during the 2018–19 NCAA Division I men's basketball season. Led by eighth-year head coach Jim Larrañaga, they played their home games at the Watsco Center on the university's campus in Coral Gables, Florida as members of the Atlantic Coast Conference (ACC).

== Previous season ==
The Hurricanes finished the 2017–18 season 22–10, 11–7 in ACC play to finish in a four-way tie for third place. They lost in the quarterfinals of the ACC tournament to North Carolina. They received an at-large bid to the NCAA tournament, where they lost in the first round to Loyola–Chicago.

== Offseason ==
=== Departures ===
Departures
Name	Number	Pos.	Height	Weight	Year	Hometown	Reason for departure
Ja’Quan Newton	0	G	6'3"	191	Senior	Philadelphia, PA	Graduated
Lonnie Walker IV	4	G	6'5"	204	Freshman	Reading, PA	Declared for the 2018 NBA draft
Mike Robinson	5	G	5'10"	170	Junior	New Britain, CT	Graduated
Bruce Brown Jr.	11	G	6'5"	202	Sophomore	Boston, MA	Declared for the 2018 NBA draft
Chris Stowell	35	F	6'6"	208	Senior	Exeter, NH	Graduated

=== Incoming transfers ===
Incoming transfers
Name	Number	Pos.	Height	Weight	Year	Hometown	Previous school
Zach Johnson	5	G	6'2"	195	Graduate	Miami, FL	Florida Gulf Coast
Anthony Mack	13	G	6'6"	218	RS freshman	Las Vegas, NV	Wyoming
Kameron McGusty	20	G	6'5"	191	Junior	Katy, TX	Texas

=== 2018 recruiting class ===
There was no recruiting class of 2018 for Miami (FL).

== Roster ==
2018–19 Miami Hurricanes men's basketball team
Players
Coaches

Pos.	#	Name	Height	Weight	Year	Hometown
G	0	Chris Lykes	5 ft 7 in (1.7 m)	161 lb (73 kg)	So	Mitchellville, MD
G	1	Dejan Vasiljevic	6 ft 3 in (1.91 m)	203 lb (92 kg)	Jr	Melbourne, Australia
G	2	Willie Herenton (W)	6 ft 1 in (1.85 m)	190 lb (86 kg)	So	Lincolnshire, IL
G	3	Anthony Lawrence II	6 ft 7 in (2.01 m)	210 lb (95 kg)	Sr	St. Petersburg, FL
G	5	Zach Johnson	6 ft 2 in (1.88 m)	195 lb (88 kg)	GS	Miami, FL
G	10	Dominic Proctor (W)	6 ft 6 in (1.98 m)	180 lb (82 kg)	So	Las Vegas, NV
G	13	Anthony Mack	6 ft 6 in (1.98 m)	218 lb (99 kg)	RS Fr	Las Vegas, NV
C	14	Rodney Miller Jr. (redshirt)	7 ft 0 in (2.13 m)	255 lb (116 kg)	Jr	Laurelton, NY
C	15	Ebuka Izundu	6 ft 10 in (2.08 m)	235 lb (107 kg)	Sr	Charlotte, NC
F	20	Dewan Hernandez (I)	6 ft 11 in (2.11 m)	236 lb (107 kg)	Jr	Miami, FL
F	21	Sam Waardenburg	6 ft 9 in (2.06 m)	217 lb (98 kg)	RS So	Henderson, New Zealand
F	22	Deng Gak	6 ft 10 in (2.08 m)	195 lb (88 kg)	RS Fr	Sydney, Australia
G	23	Kameron McGusty (I) (redshirt)	6 ft 5 in (1.96 m)	192 lb (87 kg)	Jr	Katy, TX

Head coach

- Jim Larrañaga (Providence)

Assistant coach(es)

- Chris Caputo (Westfield State)
- Adam Fisher (Penn State)
- Pooh Williamson (Tulsa)

Legend

- (C) Team captain
- (S) Suspended
- (I) Ineligible
- (W) Walk-on
- Injured
- Current redshirt

Roster
Last update: 2019-01-05

== Schedule and results ==
Date time, TV	Rank^{#}	Opponent^{#}	Result	Record	High points	High rebounds	High assists	Site (attendance) city, state
Exhibition
Oct 30, 2018*; 7:00 pm, ACCN Extra		Barry	W 91–61		19 – Izundu	10 – Izundu	8 – Herenton	Watsco Center (5,520); Coral Gables, FL
Non-conference regular season
Nov 9, 2018*; 7:00 pm, ACCN Extra		Lehigh	W 83–62	1–0	22 – Lykes	12 – Lawrence	4 – Lykes	Watsco Center (6,799); Coral Gables, FL
Nov 13, 2018*; 7:00 pm, ESPNU		Stephen F. Austin	W 96–58	2–0	22 – Izundu	18 – Izundu	6 – Lykes	Watsco Center (6,066); Coral Gables, FL
Nov 17, 2018*; 2:00 pm, ACCN Extra		Bethune–Cookman	W 78–70	3–0	21 – Lykes	9 – Lawrence	6 – Lykes	Watsco Center (6,322); Coral Gables, FL
Nov 22, 2018*; 2:30 pm, ESPNU		vs. La Salle; Wooden Legacy Quarterfinals	W 85–49	4–0	18 – Lykes	8 – Izundu	5 – Johnson	Titan Gym (866); Fullerton, CA
Nov 23, 2018*; 2:00 pm, ESPN2		vs. Fresno State; Wooden Legacy Semifinals	W 78–76	5–0	24 – Johnson	6 – Izundu	3 – Tied	Titan Gym (906); Fullerton, CA
Nov 25, 2018*; 10:30 pm, ESPN2		vs. Seton Hall; Wooden Legacy Championship	L 81–83	5–1	18 – Tied	5 – Tied	5 – Vasiljevic	Titan Gym (1,589); Fullerton, CA
Nov 28, 2018*; 7:00 pm, ESPNU		Rutgers; ACC–Big Ten Challenge	L 54–57	5–2	16 – Lawrence II	12 – Izundu	4 – Tied	Watsco Center (6,376); Coral Gables, FL
Dec 1, 2018*; 7:30 pm, ESPN3		vs. Yale; HoopHall Miami Invitational	L 73–77	5–3	19 – Izundu	9 – Izundu	5 – Johnson	American Airlines Arena (5,749); Miami, FL
Dec 4, 2018*; 7:00 pm, ESPN+		at Penn	L 75–89	5–4	17 – Johnson	7 – Izundu	5 – Lykes	The Palestra (3,019); Philadelphia, PA
Dec 19, 2018*; 2:00 pm, ACCN Extra		Houston Baptist	W 80–73	6–4	17 – Lawrence	11 – Izundu	4 – Tied	Watsco Center (6,553); Coral Gables, FL
Dec 22, 2018*; 7:00 pm, ACCN Extra		Florida Atlantic	W 75–55	7–4	19 – Izundu	13 – Izundu	8 – Lawrence	Watsco Center (6,222); Coral Gables, FL
Dec 29, 2018*; 4:00 pm, ACCRSN		Campbell	W 73–62	8–4	22 – Johnson	8 – Tied	3 – Lawrence	Watsco Center (6,789); Coral Gables, FL
ACC regular season
Jan 3, 2019; 7:00 pm, ESPNU		No. 18 NC State	L 82–87	8–5 (0–1)	28 – Lykes	11 – Izundu	4 – Johnson	Watsco Center (6,983); Coral Gables, FL
Jan 6, 2019; 6:00 pm, ESPNU		at Louisville	L 73–90	8–6 (0–2)	19 – Tied	10 – Izundu	4 – Lykes	KFC Yum! Center (15,050); Louisville, KY
Jan 9, 2019; 9:00 pm, ACCRSN		at No. 13 Florida State	L 62–68	8–7 (0–3)	17 – Lykes	9 – Izundu	4 – Mack	Donald L. Tucker Civic Center (10,531); Tallahassee, FL
Jan 12, 2019; 2:00 pm, ACCRSN		Wake Forest	W 76–65	9–7 (1–3)	25 – Lykes	11 – Izundu	4 – Lykes	Watsco Center (7,197); Coral Gables, FL
Jan 19, 2019; 12:00 pm, ESPN2		No. 13 North Carolina	L 76–85	9–8 (1–4)	20 – Lykes	8 – Izundu	6 – Lykes	Watsco Center (7,131); Coral Gables, FL
Jan 24, 2019; 8:00 pm, Raycom		at Syracuse	L 53–73	9–9 (1–5)	11 – Vasiljevic	10 – Izundu	3 – Lawrence	Carrier Dome (21,058); Syracuse, NY
Jan 27, 2019; 6:00 pm, ESPNU		Florida State	L 66–78	9–10 (1–6)	20 – Johnson	7 – Lawrence	4 – Tied	Watsco Center (7,122); Coral Gables, FL
Jan 30, 2019; 7:00 pm, ESPN2		No. 12 Virginia Tech	L 70–82	9–11 (1–7)	19 – Lykes	9 – Lawrence	4 – Lykes	Watsco Center (6,680); Coral Gables, FL
Feb 2, 2019; 2:00 pm, Raycom		at No. 3 Virginia	L 46–56	9–12 (1–8)	16 – Lykes	11 – Izundu	3 – Lawrence II	John Paul Jones Arena (13,978); Charlottesville, VA
Feb 6, 2019; 7:00 pm, ESPN2		Notre Dame	W 62–47	10–12 (2–8)	15 – Vasiljevic	12 – Lawrence	3 – Johnson	Watsco Center (6,372); Coral Gables, FL
Feb 9, 2019; 12:00 pm, Raycom		at No. 8 North Carolina	L 85–88 ^{OT}	10–13 (2–9)	27 – Lykes	10 – Izundu	5 – Lawrence II	Dean Smith Center (21,383); Chapel Hill, NC
Feb 13, 2019; 7:00 pm, ESPN2		Clemson	W 65–64	11–13 (3–9)	22 – Vasiljevic	8 – Lawrence	3 – Johnson	Watsco Center (6,338); Coral Gables, FL
Feb 17, 2019; 6:00 pm, ESPNU		at Boston College	L 57–64	11–14 (3–10)	14 – Izundu	9 – Izundu	4 – Lykes	Conte Forum (7,251); Chestnut Hill, MA
Feb 23, 2019; 2:00 pm, ACCRSN		Georgia Tech	W 80–65	12–14 (4–10)	21 – Vasiljevic	10 – Lawrence	9 – Lawrence	Watsco Center (6,813); Coral Gables, FL
Feb 26, 2019; 7:00 pm, ACCRSN		at Wake Forest	L 75–76	12–15 (4–11)	26 – Lykes	12 – Lawrence	6 – Lawrence	LJVM Coliseum (5,283); Winston-Salem, NC
Mar 2, 2019; 4:00 pm, CBS		at No. 3 Duke	L 57–87	12–16 (4–12)	15 – Izundu	9 – Izundu	3 – Lawrence II	Cameron Indoor Stadium (9,314); Durham, NC
Mar 5, 2019; 8:00 pm, Raycom		Pittsburgh	W 76–63	13–16 (5–12)	27 – Lawrence II	14 – Izundu	4 – Lawrence II	Watsco Center (6,373); Coral Gables, FL
Mar 8, 2019; 7:00 pm, ESPN2		at No. 15 Virginia Tech	L 70–84	13–17 (5–13)	16 – Izundu	11 – Lawrence II	9 – Lykes	Cassell Coliseum (9,275); Blacksburg, VA
ACC tournament
Mar 12, 2019; 12:00 pm, ESPN	(12)	vs. (13) Wake Forest; First Round	W 79–71	14–17	21 – Vasiljevic	10 – Lawrence II	4 – Tied	Spectrum Center (9,677); Charlotte, NC
Mar 13, 2019; 2:30 pm, ESPN	(12)	vs. (5) No. 16 Virginia Tech; Second Round	L 56–71	14–18	19 – Lykes	11 – Lawrence	7 – Lawrence	Spectrum Center (19,691); Charlotte, NC
*Non-conference game. ^{#}Rankings from AP Poll. (#) Tournament seedings in parentheses.

== Rankings ==
Ranking movements Legend: RV = Received votes
	Week																			
Poll	Pre	1	2	3	4	5	6	7	8	9	10	11	12	13	14	15	16	17	18	Final
AP	RV	RV																		Not released
Coaches	RV																			

*AP does not release post-NCAA Tournament rankings
