= 2018–19 Virginia Tech Hokies men's basketball team =

American college basketball season

2018–19 Virginia Tech Hokies men's basketball
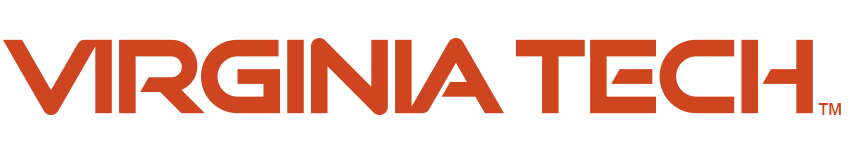

Charleston Classic champions

NCAA tournament, Sweet Sixteen
- Conference: Atlantic Coast Conference

Ranking
- Coaches: No. 14
- AP: No. 16
- Record: 26–9 (12–6 ACC)
- Head coach: Buzz Williams (5th season)
- Assistant coaches: Jamie McNeilly; Christian Webster; Devin Johnson
- Home arena: Cassell Coliseum

2018–19 ACC men's basketball standings
	Conf.				Overall
Team	W		L	PCT	W		L	PCT
No. 2 Virginia	16	–	2	.889	35	–	3	.921
No. 3 North Carolina	16	–	2	.889	29	–	7	.806
No. 1 Duke †	14	–	4	.778	32	–	6	.842
No. 10 Florida State	13	–	5	.722	29	–	8	.784
No. 16 Virginia Tech	12	–	6	.667	26	–	9	.743
Syracuse	10	–	8	.556	20	–	14	.588
Louisville	10	–	8	.556	20	–	14	.588
NC State	9	–	9	.500	24	–	12	.667
Clemson	9	–	9	.500	20	–	14	.588
Georgia Tech	6	–	12	.333	14	–	18	.438
Boston College	5	–	13	.278	14	–	17	.452
Miami (FL)	5	–	13	.278	14	–	18	.438
Wake Forest	4	–	14	.222	11	–	20	.355
Pittsburgh	3	–	15	.167	14	–	19	.424
Notre Dame	3	–	15	.167	14	–	19	.424
† 2019 ACC tournament winner Rankings from AP poll

The 2018–19 Virginia Tech Hokies men's basketball team represented Virginia Polytechnic Institute and State University during the 2018–19 NCAA Division I men's basketball season. The Hokies were led by fifth-year head coach Buzz Williams and played their home games at Cassell Coliseum in Blacksburg, Virginia, as members of the Atlantic Coast Conference. They finished the 2018–19 season 26–9, 12–6 in ACC play to finish in fifth place. They defeated Miami (FL) in the second round of the ACC tournament before losing to Florida State. They received an at-large bid to the NCAA tournament where they defeated Saint Louis and Liberty to advance to the sweet sixteen for the first time since 1965 where they lost to ACC member Duke.

On April 3, Williams left Virginia Tech to take the Texas A&M head coaching job. The Hokies hired Wofford head coach Mike Young as his replacement on April 7.

== Previous season ==
The Hokies finished the 2017–18 season 21–12, 10–8 in ACC play to finish in seventh place. They lost in the second round of the ACC tournament to Notre Dame. They received an at-large bid to the NCAA tournament where they lost in the first round to Alabama.

== Offseason ==
=== Departures ===
Name	Number	Pos.	Height	Weight	Year	Hometown	Reason for departure
Tyrie Jackson	1	G	6'1"	205	Sophomore	Tifton, GA	Transferred to NW Florida State College
Khadim Sy	2	F/C	6'10"	240	Sophomore	Dakar, Senegal	Transferred to Daytona State College
Justin Bibbs	10	G	6'5"	220	Senior	Dayton, OH	Graduated
Devin Wilson	11	G	6'4"	195	RS Senior	McKees Rocks, PA	Graduated
Nick Fullard	21	F	6'10"	235	Senior	La Plata, MD	Graduated
Justin Ammerman	22	G	6'3"	185	Junior	West Chester, PA	Left team

=== 2018 recruiting class ===
College recruiting information
Name	Hometown	School	Height	Weight	Commit date
Isaiah Wilkins; SF	Wake Forest, NC	Mount Tabor High School	6 ft 4 in (1.93 m)	180 lb (82 kg)	Jul 30, 2018
Isaiah Wilkins; SF	Recruit ratings: Scout: Rivals: 247Sports: ESPN:				
Landers Nolley II #23 SF	Fairburn, GA	Langston Hughes High School	6 ft 7 in (2.01 m)	195 lb (88 kg)	Oct 15, 2017
Landers Nolley II #23 SF	Recruit ratings: Scout: Rivals: 247Sports: ESPN:				
Jon Kabongo #28 PG	Toronto, ON	Putnam Science Academy	6 ft 3 in (1.91 m)	160 lb (73 kg)	Oct 22, 2017
Jon Kabongo #28 PG	Recruit ratings: Scout: Rivals: 247Sports: ESPN:				
Tyrece Radford; PG	Baton Rouge, LA	McKinley High School	6 ft 1 in (1.85 m)	180 lb (82 kg)	
Tyrece Radford; PG	Recruit ratings: No ratings found				
Overall recruit ranking: Scout: NA Rivals: NA 247Sports: 23 ESPN: 19
Note: In many cases, Scout, Rivals, 247Sports, On3, and ESPN may conflict in their listings of height and weight.; In these cases, the average was taken. ESPN grades are on a 100-point scale.; Sources: "Virginia Tech Commit List for 2018". Rivals.; "ESPN". ESPN.; "2018 Team Ranking". Rivals.

== Roster ==
2018–19 Virginia Tech Hokies men's basketball team
Players
Coaches

Pos.	#	Name	Height	Weight	Year	Previous school	Hometown
G	1	Isaiah Wilikins	6 ft 3 in (1.91 m)	230 lb (104 kg)	Fr	Mount Tabor	Winston-Salem, North Carolina
G	3	Wabissa Bede	6 ft 1 in (1.85 m)	195 lb (88 kg)	So	Cushing Academy	North Andover, Massachusetts
G	4	Nickeil Alexander-Walker	6 ft 5 in (1.96 m)	210 lb (95 kg)	So	Hamilton Heights Christian Academy	Toronto, Ontario
G	5	Justin Robinson	6 ft 2 in (1.88 m)	190 lb (86 kg)	Sr	St. James School (MD)	Manassas, Virginia
G	10	Jonathan Kabongo	6 ft 4 in (1.93 m)	195 lb (88 kg)	Fr	Thornlea Secondary	Toronto, Ontario
G	11	Brendan Palmer (W)	6 ft 3 in (1.91 m)	190 lb (86 kg)	Fr	Forsyth Country Day	Lewisville, North Carolina
G	13	Ahmed Hill	6 ft 5 in (1.96 m)	205 lb (93 kg)	RS Sr	Aquinas	Augusta, Georgia
G	14	P. J. Horne	6 ft 5 in (1.96 m)	230 lb (104 kg)	So	Tift County	Tifton, Georgia
G/F	15	Chris Clarke	6 ft 6 in (1.98 m)	215 lb (98 kg)	Sr	Cape Henry	Virginia Beach, Virginia
G/F	21	Landers Nolley II (redshirt)	6 ft 7 in (2.01 m)	230 lb (104 kg)	Fr	Langston Hughes	Fairburn, Georgia
G	23	Tyrece Radford (redshirt)	6 ft 2 in (1.88 m)	195 lb (88 kg)	Fr	McKinley	Baton Rouge, Louisiana
F	24	Kerry Blackshear Jr.	6 ft 10 in (2.08 m)	250 lb (113 kg)	RS Jr	Maynard Evans	Orlando, Florida
G/F	42	Ty Outlaw	6 ft 6 in (1.98 m)	220 lb (100 kg)	GS	Person/Lee College	Roxboro, North Carolina

Head coach

- Buzz Williams (Oklahoma City)

Assistant coach(es)

- Jamie McNeilly (New Orleans)
- Christian Webster (Harvard)
- Devin Johnson (New Orleans)

Legend

- (C) Team captain
- (S) Suspended
- (I) Ineligible
- (W) Walk-on
- Injured
- Current redshirt

Roster

== Schedule and results ==
Date time, TV	Rank^{#}	Opponent^{#}	Result	Record	High points	High rebounds	High assists	Site (attendance) city, state
Exhibition
Nov 4, 2018*; 3:00 pm	No. 15	at Liberty; Hurricane Relief Exhibition	W 86–70	–	20 – Robinson	7 – Tied	9 – Robinson	Vines Center (4,210); Lynchburg, VA
Non-conference regular season
Nov 9, 2018*; 7:00 pm, ACCN Extra	No. 15	Gardner–Webb	W 87–59	1–0	21 – Tied	6 – Tied	8 – Robinson	Cassell Coliseum (7,736); Blacksburg, VA
Nov 15, 2018*; 11:30 am, ESPN2	No. 16	vs. Ball State; Charleston Classic Quarterfinals	W 73–64	2–0	21 – Alexander-Walker	7 – Blackshear	6 – Robinson	TD Arena (2,648); Charleston, SC
Nov 16, 2018*; 11:00 am, ESPN2	No. 16	vs. Northeastern; Charleston Classic Semifinals	W 88–60	3–0	20 – Alexander-Walker	7 – Outlaw	7 – Alexander-Walker	TD Arena (2,752); Charleston, SC
Nov 18, 2018*; 8:30 pm, ESPN2	No. 16	vs. No. 23 Purdue; Charleston Classic championship	W 89–83	4–0	25 – Alexander-Walker	7 – Alexander-Walker	6 – Robinson	TD Arena (3,985); Charleston, SC
Nov 24, 2018*; 1:00 pm, ACCN Extra	No. 13	Saint Francis (PA)	W 75–37	5–0	19 – Hill	8 – Wilkins	7 – Robinson	Cassell Coliseum (7,474); Blacksburg, VA
Nov 27, 2018*; 7:00 pm, ESPN2	No. 13	at Penn State; ACC–Big Ten Challenge	L 62–63	5–1	19 – Robinson	9 – Blackshear	3 – Tied	Bryce Jordan Center (8,373); University Park, PA
Dec 1, 2018*; 1:00 pm, ACCN Extra	No. 13	Central Connecticut	W 94–40	6–1	24 – Hill	6 – Outlaw	13 – Robinson	Cassell Coliseum (9,275); Blacksburg, VA
Dec 5, 2018*; 7:00 pm, ACCN Extra	No. 15	VMI	W 89–68	7–1	18 – Robinson	11 – Outlaw	5 – Robinson	Cassell Coliseum (7,748); Blacksburg, VA
Dec 9, 2018*; 1:00 pm, ACCN Extra	No. 15	South Carolina State	W 81–44	8–1	19 – Alexander-Walker	13 – Blackshear	6 – Robinson	Cassell Coliseum (5,305); Blacksburg, VA
Dec 15, 2018*; 7:00 pm, ESPNU	No. 13	vs. Washington; Boardwalk Classic	W 73–61	9–1	24 – Alexander-Walker	6 – Tied	3 – Tied	Boardwalk Hall (5,456); Atlantic City, NJ
Dec 19, 2018*; 7:00 pm, ACCN Extra	No. 13	North Carolina A&T	W 82–60	10–1	20 – Alexander-Walker	9 – Blackshear	6 – Robinson	Cassell Coliseum (6,681); Blacksburg, VA
Dec 28, 2018*; 7:00 pm, ACCN Extra	No. 10	Maryland Eastern Shore	W 85–40	11–1	20 – Hill	7 – Bede	6 – Tied	Cassell Coliseum (7,632); Blacksburg, VA
ACC regular season
Jan 1, 2019; 1:00 pm, ESPNU	No. 10	Notre Dame	W 81–66	12–1 (1–0)	21 – Blackshear	7 – Blackshear	8 – Robinson	Cassell Coliseum (8,008); Blacksburg, VA
Jan 5, 2019; 12:00 pm, ACCRSN	No. 10	Boston College	W 77–66	13–1 (2–0)	25 – Alexander-Walker	8 – Robinson	5 – Robinson	Cassell Coliseum (7,009); Blacksburg, VA
Jan 9, 2019; 7:00 pm, ACCRSN	No. 9	at Georgia Tech	W 52–49	14–1 (3–0)	15 – Hill	10 – Blackshear	6 – Alexander-Walker	McCamish Pavilion (6,166); Atlanta, GA
Jan 15, 2019; 8:00 pm, Raycom	No. 9	at No. 4 Virginia; Rivalry	L 59–81	14–2 (3–1)	19 – Alexander-Walker	4 – Alexander-Walker	3 – Alexander-Walker	John Paul Jones Arena (14,623); Charlottesville, VA
Jan 19, 2019; 4:00 pm, ACCRSN	No. 9	Wake Forest	W 87–71	15–2 (4–1)	24 – Alexander-Walker	7 – Alexander-Walker	5 – Bede	Cassell Coliseum (9,275); Blacksburg, VA
Jan 21, 2019; 7:00 pm, ESPN	No. 10	at No. 11 North Carolina	L 82–103	15–3 (4–2)	20 – Hill	17 – Blackshear	6 – Robinson	Dean Smith Center (21,148); Chapel Hill, NC
Jan 26, 2019; 8:00 pm, ESPN	No. 10	Syracuse	W 78–56	16–3 (5–2)	35 – Robinson	7 – Outlaw	8 – 2 tied	Cassell Coliseum (9,275); Blacksburg, VA
Jan 30, 2019; 7:00 pm, ESPN2	No. 12	at Miami (FL)	W 82–70	17–3 (6–2)	25 – Alexander-Walker	9 – Blackshear Jr.	5 – Alexander-Walker	Watsco Center (6,860); Coral Gables, FL
Feb 2, 2019; 12:00 pm, Raycom	No. 12	at No. 23 NC State	W 47–24	18–3 (7–2)	13 – Blackshear Jr.	13 – Blackshear Jr.	3 – 2 tied	PNC Arena (19,500); Raleigh, NC
Feb 4, 2019; 7:00 pm, ESPN	No. 11	No. 16 Louisville	L 64–72	18–4 (7–3)	21 – Blackshear Jr.	7 – Outlaw	5 – Bede	Cassell Coliseum (9,275); Blacksburg, VA
Feb 9, 2019; 12:00 pm, ESPN2	No. 11	at Clemson	L 51–59	18–5 (7–4)	17 – Blackshear Jr.	8 – Outlaw	3 – 2 Tied	Littlejohn Coliseum (9,000); Clemson, SC
Feb 13, 2019; 8:00 pm, Raycom	No. 22	Georgia Tech	W 76–68	19–5 (8–4)	20 – Outlaw	6 – Tied	8 – Blackshear Jr.	Cassell Coliseum (9,275); Blacksburg, VA
Feb 16, 2019; 12:00 pm, ACCRSN	No. 22	at Pittsburgh	W 70–64	20–5 (9–4)	29 – Blackshear Jr.	9 – 2 Tied	7 – Bede	Petersen Events Center (10,289); Pittsburgh, PA
Feb 18, 2019; 7:00 pm, ESPN	No. 20	No. 3 Virginia; Rivalry	L 58–64	20–6 (9–5)	23 – Blackshear Jr.	13 – Blackshear Jr.	4 – Alexander-Walker	Cassell Coliseum (9,275); Blacksburg, VA
Feb 23, 2019; 4:00 pm, ESPN	No. 20	at Notre Dame	W 67–59	21–6 (10–5)	22 – Blackshear Jr.	14 – Blackshear Jr.	3 – Tied	Edmund P. Joyce Center (8,787); South Bend, IN
Feb 26, 2019; 7:00 pm, ESPN	No. 20	No. 3 Duke	W 77–72	22–6 (11–5)	23 – Blackshear Jr.	10 – Blackshear Jr.	6 – Alexander-Walker	Cassell Coliseum (9,275); Blacksburg, VA
Mar 5, 2019; 7:00 pm, ESPNU	No. 15	at No. 14 Florida State	L 64–73 ^{OT}	22–7 (11–6)	19 – Alexander-Walker	9 – Hill	4 – Blackshear Jr.	Donald L. Tucker Center (10,611); Tallahassee, FL
Mar 8, 2019; 7:00 pm, ESPN2	No. 15	Miami (FL)	W 84–70	23–7 (12–6)	21 – Alexander-Walker	10 – Alexander-Walker	8 – Alexander-Walker	Cassell Coliseum (9,275); Blacksburg, VA
ACC Tournament
Mar 13, 2019; 2:30 pm, ESPN	(5) No. 16	vs. (12) Miami; Second Round	W 71–56	24–7	19 – Blackshear Jr.	10 – Blackshear Jr.	6 – Alexander-Walker	Spectrum Center (19,691); Charlotte, NC
Mar 14, 2019; 2:30 pm, ESPN	(5) No. 16	vs. (4) No. 12 Florida State; Quarterfinals	L 63–65 ^{OT}	24–8	21 – Alexander-Walker	9 – Blackshear Jr.	4 – Alexander-Walker	Spectrum Center (19,691); Charlotte, NC
NCAA tournament
Mar 22, 2019*; 9:57 pm, truTV	(4 E) No. 16	vs. (13 E) Saint Louis; First Round	W 66–52	25–8	20 – Alexander-Walker	7 – Outlaw	2 – Tied	SAP Center (12,824); San Jose, CA
Mar 24, 2019*; 7:10 pm, TBS	(4 E) No. 16	vs. (12 E) Liberty; Second Round	W 67–58	26–8	19 – Blackshear Jr.	11 – Outlaw	6 – Alexander-Walker	SAP Center (14,802); San Jose, CA
Mar 29, 2019*; 9:45 pm, CBS	(4 E) No. 16	vs. (1 E) No. 1 Duke; Sweet Sixteen	L 73–75	26–9	18 – Blackshear Jr.	16 – Blackshear Jr.	5 – Blackshear Jr.	Capital One Arena (20,006); Washington, D.C.
*Non-conference game. ^{#}Rankings from AP Poll. (#) Tournament seedings in parentheses. E=East. All times are in Eastern Time.

== Player statistics ==
Legend
GP	Games played	GS	Games started	MPG	Minutes per game
FG%	Field-goal percentage	3P%	3-point field-goal percentage	FT%	Free-throw percentage
RPG	Rebounds per game	APG	Assists per game	SPG	Steals per game
BPG	Blocks per game	PPG	Points per game

No.	Player	GP	GS	MPG	FG%	3P%	FT%	RPG	APG	SPG	BPG	PPG
1	Isaiah Wilkins	14		14.4	47.2	46.4	73.7	2.2	0.9	0.4	0.1	5.5
3	Wabissa Bede	15		19.7	44.7	43.3	0.0	2.1	2.1	0.8	0.0	3.7
4	Nickeil Alexander-Walker	14		32.5	54.6	42.4	79.1	4.1	3.6	2.2	0.6	17.8
5	Justin Robinson	15		32.4	44.7	36.7	80.0	3.8	5.8	1.7	0.1	13.1
10	Jonathan Kabongo	8		5.9	33.3	25.0	33.3	0.5	0.4	0.1	0.0	1.8
11	Brendan Palmer	3		0.7	N/A	N/A	N/A	0.0	0.0	0.0	0.0	0.0
13	Ahmed Hill	15		33.1	46.3	44.8	93.3	3.5	1.7	0.9	0.1	12.7
14	P.J. Horne	15		16.9	65.4	0.0	80.0	3.3	0.6	0.3	0.5	5.1
24	Kerry Blackshear Jr.	15		25.7	54.2	34.8	66.2	6.2	1.7	0.5	0.9	14.1
42	Ty Outlaw	15		25.1	46.7	49.3	33.3	5.1	1.1	0.4	0.5	7.9

== Rankings ==
Ranking movements Legend: ██ Increase in ranking ██ Decrease in ranking
	Week																			
Poll	Pre	1	2	3	4	5	6	7	8	9	10	11	12	13	14	15	16	17	18	Final
AP	15	16	13	13	15	13	13	10	10	9	9	10	12	11	22	20	20	15	16	Not released
Coaches	17	17^	14	12	14	13	13	10	10	7	7	8	11	10	16	18	19	16	15	14

^Coaches did not release a Week 2 poll.
