= Boardwalk Battle Tournament =

- Sport: College basketball
- Founded: 2018
- Founder: Naismith Memorial Basketball Hall of Fame
- No. of teams: 8
- Country: United States
- Venue: Boardwalk Hall
- Broadcaster: ESPN

The Boardwalk Battle Tournament is an early-season college basketball tournament operated by the Naismith Memorial Basketball Hall of Fame that takes place in early December of each year.

The tournament had its inaugural run in December 2018. The tournament's name was changed from the Boardwalk Classic to the Boardwalk Battle Tournament in 2019.

== History ==
Beginning in December 2018, the Boardwalk Battle Tournament featured eight teams in a quadruple header.

=== Yearly results ===
Date	Winner	Score	Opponent	Location
December 15, 2018	Princeton	85–81	Iona	Boardwalk Hall; Atlantic City, New Jersey
December 15, 2018	Temple	77–75^{OT}	Davidson	Boardwalk Hall; Atlantic City, New Jersey
December 15, 2018	NC State	89–78	Penn State	Boardwalk Hall; Atlantic City, New Jersey
December 15, 2018	No. 13 Virginia Tech	73–61	Washington	Boardwalk Hall; Atlantic City, New Jersey

== Wins by team ==
Team	Wins	Years
NC State	1	2018
Princeton	1	2018
Temple	1	2018
Virginia Tech	1	2018
Davidson	0	2018
Iona	0	2018
Penn State	0	2018
Washington	0	2018
