= 2018–19 Wake Forest Demon Deacons men's basketball team =

American college basketball season

2018–19 Wake Forest Demon Deacons men's basketball
- Conference: Atlantic Coast Conference
- Record: 11–20 (4–14 ACC)
- Head coach: Danny Manning (5th season)
- Assistant coaches: Steve Woodberry; Randolph Childress; Jamil Jones
- Home arena: LJVM Coliseum

2018–19 ACC men's basketball standings
| | Conf. | | | | Overall |
| Team | W | | L | PCT | W | | L | PCT |
|---|---|---|---|---|---|---|---|---|
| No. 2 Virginia | 16 | – | 2 | .889 | 35 | – | 3 | .921 |
| No. 3 North Carolina | 16 | – | 2 | .889 | 29 | – | 7 | .806 |
| No. 1 Duke † | 14 | – | 4 | .778 | 32 | – | 6 | .842 |
| No. 10 Florida State | 13 | – | 5 | .722 | 29 | – | 8 | .784 |
| No. 16 Virginia Tech | 12 | – | 6 | .667 | 26 | – | 9 | .743 |
| Syracuse | 10 | – | 8 | .556 | 20 | – | 14 | .588 |
| Louisville | 10 | – | 8 | .556 | 20 | – | 14 | .588 |
| NC State | 9 | – | 9 | .500 | 24 | – | 12 | .667 |
| Clemson | 9 | – | 9 | .500 | 20 | – | 14 | .588 |
| Georgia Tech | 6 | – | 12 | .333 | 14 | – | 18 | .438 |
| Boston College | 5 | – | 13 | .278 | 14 | – | 17 | .452 |
| Miami (FL) | 5 | – | 13 | .278 | 14 | – | 18 | .438 |
| Wake Forest | 4 | – | 14 | .222 | 11 | – | 20 | .355 |
| Pittsburgh | 3 | – | 15 | .167 | 14 | – | 19 | .424 |
| Notre Dame | 3 | – | 15 | .167 | 14 | – | 19 | .424 |
† 2019 ACC tournament winner Rankings from AP poll

The 2018–19 Wake Forest Demon Deacons men's basketball team represented Wake Forest University during the 2018–19 NCAA Division I men's basketball season. The Demon Deacons were led by fifth-year head coach Danny Manning and played their home games at the Lawrence Joel Veterans Memorial Coliseum in Winston-Salem, North Carolina as members of the Atlantic Coast Conference.

== Previous season ==
The Demon Deacons finished 2017–18 season 11–20, 4–14 in ACC play to finish in 14th place. They lost in the first round of the ACC tournament to Syracuse.

== Offseason ==
=== Departures ===
| Name | Number | Pos. | Height | Weight | Year | Hometown | Reason for departure |
|---|---|---|---|---|---|---|---|
| Keyshawn Woods | 1 | G | 6'3" | 205 | RS Junior | Gastonia, NC | Transferred to Ohio State |
| D. J. Mitchell | 2 | F | 6'8" | 215 | Sophomore | Clovis, CA | Transferred to Santa Clara |
| Doral Moore | 4 | C | 7'1" | 280 | Junior | Locust Grove, GA | Declared for 2018 NBA draft |
| Mitchell Wilbekin | 10 | G | 6'2" | 180 | Senior | Gainesville, FL | Graduated |
| Bryant Crawford | 13 | G | 6'3" | 200 | Junior | Kensington, MD | Declared for 2018 NBA draft |
| Terrence Thompson | 20 | F | 6'7" | 215 | Senior | Durham, NC | Graduated |
| Sam Japhet-Mathias | 25 | C | 6'11" | 280 | Sophomore | London, England | Dismissed from team |
| Troy Rike | 45 | F | 6'7" | 225 | Senior | San Francisco, CA | Graduated |
| Britton Anderson | 52 | G | 6'4" | 200 | Senior | Great Falls, VA | Graduated |

=== Incoming transfers ===
| Name | Number | Pos. | Height | Weight | Year | Hometown | Previous School |
|---|---|---|---|---|---|---|---|
| Andrien White | 2 | G | 6'3" | 195 | Senior | Richmond, VA | Charlotte |
| Torry Johnson | 4 | G | 6'3" | 165 | RS Senior | Chicago, IL | Northern Arizona |
| Ikenna Smart | 35 | F | 6'10" | 241 | RS Senior | Greensboro, NC | Buffalo |
| Miles Lester | 55 | G | 6'0" | 170 | Sophomore | Wichita, KS | Rice |

=== 2018 recruiting class ===
College recruiting information
| Name | Hometown | School | Height | Weight | Commit date |
|---|---|---|---|---|---|
| Jaylen Hoard #6 SF | Carnon, France | Wesleyan Christian Academy | 6 ft 8 in (2.03 m) | 195 lb (88 kg) | Aug 26, 2017 |
| Jaylen Hoard #6 SF | Recruit ratings: Scout: Rivals: 247Sports: ESPN: | | | | |
| Isaiah Mucius #20 SF | Saint James, MD | Brewster Academy | 6 ft 7 in (2.01 m) | 180 lb (82 kg) | Sep 18, 2017 |
| Isaiah Mucius #20 SF | Recruit ratings: Scout: Rivals: 247Sports: ESPN: | | | | |
| Sharone Wright #50 SG | Florence, SC | West Florence High School | 6 ft 5 in (1.96 m) | 200 lb (91 kg) | May 12, 2017 |
| Sharone Wright #50 SG | Recruit ratings: Scout: Rivals: 247Sports: ESPN: | | | | |
| Jamie Lewis #39 SG | Atlanta, GA | Findlay Prep | 6 ft 3 in (1.91 m) | 185 lb (84 kg) | Nov 8, 2017 |
| Jamie Lewis #39 SG | Recruit ratings: Scout: Rivals: 247Sports: ESPN: | | | | |
| Michael Wynn; SG | Allen, KY | Hargrave Military Academy | 6 ft 6 in (1.98 m) | 185 lb (84 kg) | Jul 11, 2018 |
| Michael Wynn; SG | Recruit ratings: Scout: Rivals: 247Sports: ESPN: | | | | |
Overall recruit ranking:
Note: In many cases, Scout, Rivals, 247Sports, On3, and ESPN may conflict in their listings of height and weight.; In these cases, the average was taken. ESPN grades are on a 100-point scale.; Sources: "2018 Team Ranking". Rivals.

== Roster ==
2018–19 Wake Forest Demon Deacons men's basketball team
Players
Coaches

| Pos. | # | Name | Height | Weight | Year | Previous school | Hometown |
|---|---|---|---|---|---|---|---|
| G | 0 | Brandon Childress | 6 ft 0 in (1.83 m) | 190 lb (86 kg) | Jr | Wesleyan Christian Academy | Winston-Salem, NC |
| F | 1 | Isaiah Mucius | 6 ft 8 in (2.03 m) | 190 lb (86 kg) | Fr | Brewster Academy | East Patchogue, NY |
| G | 2 | Sharone Wright Jr. | 6 ft 5 in (1.96 m) | 180 lb (82 kg) | Fr | Legacy Early College | Florence, SC |
| G | 4 | Torry Johnson | 6 ft 3 in (1.91 m) | 170 lb (77 kg) | RS Sr | Morgan Park; Northern Arizona | Chicago, IL |
| F | 10 | Jaylen Hoard | 6 ft 8 in (2.03 m) | 210 lb (95 kg) | Fr | Wesleyan Christian Academy | Carnon, France |
| G/F | 11 | Melo Eggleston | 6 ft 8 in (2.03 m) | 200 lb (91 kg) | So | Notre Dame Prep | Suitland, MD |
| G | 13 | Andrien White (redshirt) | 6 ft 3 in (1.91 m) | 195 lb (88 kg) | Sr | Quality Education Academy; Charlotte | Richmond, Virginia |
| G | 20 | Michael Wynn | 6 ft 6 in (1.98 m) | 200 lb (91 kg) | Fr | Liberty Heights Athletic Institute | Albany, NY |
| G | 23 | Chaundee Brown | 6 ft 5 in (1.96 m) | 215 lb (98 kg) | So | First Academy | Orlando, FL |
| G | 25 | Jamie Lewis | 6 ft 3 in (1.91 m) | 190 lb (86 kg) | Fr | Westlake | Atlanta, GA |
| C | 30 | Olivier Sarr | 7 ft 0 in (2.13 m) | 215 lb (98 kg) | So | INSEP | Toulouse, France |
| F | 31 | Blake Buchanan | 6 ft 5 in (1.96 m) | 195 lb (88 kg) | Fr | Voyager Academy | Durham, NC |
| F | 34 | Sunday Okeke (W) | 6 ft 8 in (2.03 m) | 240 lb (109 kg) | So | Greens Farms Academy | Lagos, Nigera |
| F | 35 | Ikenna Smart | 6 ft 10 in (2.08 m) | 240 lb (109 kg) | RS Sr | New Garden Friends School; Buffalo | Greensboro, NC |
| G | 40 | Anthony Bilas (W) | 6 ft 2 in (1.88 m) | 160 lb (73 kg) | Sr | Charlotte Latin School | Charlotte, NC |
| G | 41 | Aaron Spivey (W) | 6 ft 2 in (1.88 m) | 175 lb (79 kg) | Sr | Nash Central | Rocky Mount, NC |
| G | 55 | Miles Lester (W) (redshirt) | 6 ft 0 in (1.83 m) | 170 lb (77 kg) | So | Wilbraham & Monson Academy; Rice | Wichita, KS |

Head coach

- Danny Manning (Kansas)

Assistant coach(es)

- Steve Woodberry (Kansas)
- Randolph Childress (Wake Forest)
- Jamil Jones (Arkansas Tech)

Legend

- (C) Team captain
- (S) Suspended
- (I) Ineligible
- (W) Walk-on
- Injured
- Current redshirt

Roster

== Schedule and results ==
| Date time, TV | Rank^{#} | Opponent^{#} | Result | Record | High points | High rebounds | High assists | Site (attendance) city, state |
Exhibition
| November 2, 2018*; 7:30 pm | | Belmont Abbey | W 106–74 | | 19 – Hoard | 13 – Sarr | 7 – Halloran | LJVM Coliseum (3,802); Winston-Salem, NC |
Non-conference regular season
| November 10, 2018*; 2:00 pm, ACCN Extra | | North Carolina A&T | W 90–78 | 1–0 | 19 – Hoard | 13 – Hoard | 6 – Childress | LJVM Coliseum (5,572); Winston-Salem, NC |
| November 15, 2018*; 11:30 am, ESPNU | | vs. Saint Joseph's; Myrtle Beach Invitational quarterfinals | L 69–89 | 1–1 | 14 – Tied | 5 – Childress | 4 – Childress | HTC Center (3,132); Conway, SC |
| November 16, 2018*; 11:00 am, ESPNU | | vs. Cal State Fullerton; Myrtle Beach Invitational | W 66–59 | 2–1 | 15 – Tied | 7 – Hoard | 5 – Childress | HTC Center (3,132); Conway, SC |
| November 18, 2018*; 10:30 am, ESPNU | | vs. Valparaiso; Myrtle Beach Invitational | W 69–63 | 3–1 | 14 – Hoard | 9 – Hoard | 5 – Childress | HTC Center (639); Conway, SC |
| November 23, 2018*; 2:00 pm, ACCN Extra | | Houston Baptist | L 91–93 ^{OT} | 3–2 | 27 – Childress | 15 – Hoard | 5 – Childress | LJVM Coliseum (5,109); Winston-Salem, NC |
| November 27, 2018*; 7:00 pm, ACCN Extra | | Western Carolina | W 71–64 | 4–2 | 20 – Childress | 7 – Sarr | 3 – Childress | LJVM Coliseum (4,741); Winston-Salem, NC |
| December 1, 2018*; 7:30 pm, NBCSN | | at Richmond | L 74–84 | 4–3 | 17 – Tied | 7 – Mucius | 3 – Childress | Robins Center (6,076); Richmond, VA |
| December 6, 2018*; 7:00 pm, ACCN Extra | | Charlotte | W 80–56 | 5–3 | 16 – Mucius | 9 – Sarr | 4 – Childress | LJVM Coliseum (5,248); Winston-Salem, NC |
| December 17, 2018*; 7:00 pm, ESPNU | | Davidson | W 67–63 | 6–3 | 16 – Tied | 8 – Brown | 4 – Tied | LJVM Coliseum (6,149); Winston-Salem, NC |
| December 22, 2018*; 12:00 pm, ESPN2 | | at No. 3 Tennessee | L 64–83 | 6–4 | 19 – Brown | 6 – Brown | 5 – Childress | Thompson–Boling Arena (19,846); Knoxville, TN |
| December 29, 2018*; 2:00 pm, ACCN Extra | | Gardner–Webb | L 69–73 | 6–5 | 18 – Childress | 9 – Sarr | 3 – Childress | LJVM Coliseum (5,975); Winston-Salem, NC |
| January 2, 2019*; 7:00 pm, ACCN Extra | | Cornell | W 83–61 | 7–5 | 23 – Hoard | 15 – Hoard | 5 – Childress | LJVM Coliseum (4,878); Winston-Salem, NC |
ACC regular season
| January 5, 2019; 2:00 pm, ACCRSN | | at Georgia Tech | L 79–92 | 7–6 (0–1) | 28 – Childress | 8 – Hoard | 3 – Childress | McCamish Pavilion (6,397); Atlanta, GA |
| January 8, 2019; 7:00 pm, ESPN | | No. 1 Duke | L 65–87 | 7–7 (0–2) | 13 – Hoard | 9 – Tied | 3 – Childress | LJVM Coliseum (14,268); Winston-Salem, NC |
| January 12, 2019; 12:00 pm, ACCRSN | | at Miami (FL) | L 65–76 | 7–8 (0–3) | 22 – Brown | 11 – Hoard | 7 – Childress | Watsco Center (7,197); Coral Gables, FL |
| January 15, 2019; 8:00 pm, Raycom | | No. 17 NC State; Rivalry | W 71–67 | 8–8 (1–3) | 16 – Hoard | 10 – Hoard | 4 – Childress | LJVM Coliseum (10,157); Winston-Salem, NC |
| January 19, 2019; 4:00 pm, ACCRSN | | at No. 9 Virginia Tech | L 71–87 | 8–9 (1–4) | 28 – Childress | 7 – Hoard | 3 – Brown | Cassell Coliseum (9,275); Blacksburg, VA |
| January 22, 2019; 9:00 pm, ACCRSN | | at No. 3 Virginia | L 45–68 | 8–10 (1–5) | 12 – Childress | 8 – Sarr | 4 – Johnson | John Paul Jones Arena (14,273); Charlottesville, VA |
| January 26, 2019; 4:00 pm, ACCRSN | | Boston College | L 61–65 | 8–11 (1–6) | 22 – Hoard | 11 – Sarr | 7 – Childress | LJVM Coliseum (9,487); Winston-Salem, NC |
| January 30, 2019; 8:00 pm, Raycom | | No. 15 Louisville | L 54–82 | 8–12 (1–7) | 13 – Childress | 8 – Hoard | 2 – Childress | LJVM Coliseum (7,031); Winston-Salem, NC |
| February 3, 2019; 12:00 pm, ESPNU | | at Clemson | L 37–64 | 8–13 (1–8) | 12 – Brown | 7 – Hoard | 3 – Wright | Littlejohn Coliseum (7,655); Clemson, SC |
| February 5, 2019; 7:00 pm, ESPNU | | Pittsburgh | W 78–76 ^{OT} | 9–13 (2–8) | 19 – Hoard | 17 – Hoard | 6 – Childress | LJVM Coliseum (5,170); Winston-Salem, NC |
| February 13, 2019; 7:00 pm, ACCRSN | | at No. 17 Florida State | L 66–88 | 9–14 (2–9) | 20 – Brown | 6 – Hoard | 4 – Childress | Donald L. Tucker Center (7,806); Tallahassee, FL |
| February 16, 2019; 12:00 pm, Raycom | | No. 8 North Carolina | L 57–95 | 9–15 (2–10) | 17 – Hoard | 6 – Tied | 2 – Brown | LJVM Coliseum (14,352); Winston-Salem, NC |
| February 19, 2019; 6:00 pm, ESPNU | | at Notre Dame | W 75–68 | 10–15 (3–10) | 20 – Childress | 7 – Childress | 8 – Childress | Edmund P. Joyce Center (8,286); South Bend, IN |
| February 24, 2019; 6:00 pm, ESPNU | | at NC State; Rivalry | L 74–94 | 10–16 (3–11) | 17 – Hoard | 8 – Okeke | 4 – Childress | PNC Arena (16,053); Raleigh, NC |
| February 26, 2019; 7:00 pm, ACCRSN | | Miami (FL) | W 76–75 | 11–16 (4–11) | 21 – Tied | 14 – Brown | 5 – Tied | LJVM Coliseum (5,283); Winston-Salem, NC |
| March 2, 2019; 12:00 pm, Raycom | | Syracuse | L 54–79 | 11–17 (4–12) | 14 – Brown | 6 – Brown | 3 – Wright Jr. | LJVM Coliseum (9,721); Winston-Salem, NC |
| March 5, 2019; 7:00 pm, ESPN | | at No. 4 Duke | L 70–71 | 11–18 (4–13) | 21 – Brown | 10 – Tied | 3 – Childress | Cameron Indoor Stadium (9,314); Durham, NC |
| March 9, 2019; 12:00 pm, Raycom | | No. 14 Florida State | L 57–65 | 11–19 (4–14) | 13 – Childress | 9 – Brown | 2 – Wright Jr. | LJVM Coliseum (8,873); Winston-Salem, NC |
ACC tournament
| March 12, 2019; 12:00 pm, ESPN | (13) | vs. (12) Miami (FL); First Round | L 71–79 | 11–20 | 16 – Tied | 7 – Tied | 5 – Childress | Spectrum Center; Charlotte, NC |
*Non-conference game. ^{#}Rankings from AP Poll. (#) Tournament seedings in parentheses. All times are in Eastern Time.
