= George Mason Patriots men's basketball statistical leaders =

The George Mason Patriots men's basketball statistical leaders are individual statistical leaders of the George Mason Patriots basketball program in various categories, including points, rebounds, assists, steals, and blocks. Within those areas, the lists identify single-game, single-season, and career leaders. The Patriots represent George Mason University in the NCAA's Atlantic 10 Conference.

George Mason began competing in intercollegiate basketball in 1966. The NCAA did not officially record assists as a stat until the 1983–84 season, and blocks and steals until the 1985–86 season, but George Mason's record books includes players in these stats before these seasons. These lists are updated through the end of the 2020–21 season.

== Scoring ==
Career
Rk	Player	Points	Seasons
1	Carlos Yates	2,420	1981–82 1982–83 1983–84 1984–85
2	Kenny Sanders	2,177	1985–86 1986–87 1987–88 1988–89
3	George Evans	1,953	1997–98 1998–99 1999–00 2000–01
4	Otis Livingston II	1,865	2015–16 2016–17 2017–18 2018–19
5	Robert Dykes	1,642	1987–88 1988–89 1989–90 1990–91
6	Ryan Pearson	1,626	2008–09 2009–10 2010–11 2011–12
7	Sherrod Wright	1,593	2009–10 2011–12 2012–13 2013–14
8	Andre Gaddy	1,568	1977–78 1978–79 1979–80 1981–82
9	Rob Rose	1,565	1982–83 1983–84 1984–85 1985–86
10	Will Thomas	1,564	2004–05 2005–06 2006–07 2007–08

Season
Rk	Player	Points	Season
1	Rudolph Jones	779	1972–73
2	Rudolph Jones	746	1971–72
3	Carlos Yates	723	1982–83
4	Carlos Yates	694	1984–85
5	Kenny Sanders	680	1988–89
6	Kenny Sanders	638	1987–88
7	Sherrod Wright	632	2012–13
8	Curtis McCants	594	1995–96
9	Herb Estes	581	1973–74
	Robert Dykes	581	1990–91

Single game
Rk	Player	Points	Season	Opponent
1	Carlos Yates	42	1984–85	Navy
2	Dave Skaff	41	1980–81	Catholic
3	Herb Estes	39	1973–74	DC Teachers
	Donald Ross	39	1993–94	American
	Hal Woodside	39	1967–68	Bowie State
	Carlos Yates	39	1983–84	Long Island
	Javon Greene	39	2019–20	Richmond
7	Herb Estes	38	1973–74	Catholic
	Curtis McCants	38	1995–96	Cal Poly SLO
	Hal Woodside	38	1967–68	Virginia Wesleyan
	George Evans	38	1999–00	Toledo

== Rebounds ==
Career
Rk	Player	Rebounds	Seasons
1	Jim Nowers	1,048	1972–73 1973–74 1974–75 1975–76
2	Kenny Sanders	1,026	1985–86 1986–87 1987–88 1988–89
3	Will Thomas	993	2004–05 2005–06 2006–07 2007–08
4	George Evans	953	1997–98 1998–99 1999–00 2000–01
5	Robert Dykes	925	1987–88 1988–89 1989–90 1990–91
6	Andre Gaddy	916	1977–78 1978–79 1979–80 1981–82
7	Jai Lewis	895	2002–03 2003–04 2004–05 2005–06
8	Ryan Pearson	806	2008–09 2009–10 2010–11 2011–12
9	Rob Rose	805	1982–83 1983–84 1984–85 1985–86
10	Herb Estes	734	1973–74 1974–75 1975–76

Season
Rk	Player	Rebounds	Season
1	Marquise Moore	369	2016–17
2	Will Thomas	353	2007–08
3	Shevon Thompson	351	2014–15
4	Kenny Sanders	339	1987–88
5	Shevon Thompson	329	2015–16
6	Kenny Sanders	326	1988–89
7	Jim Nowers	318	1973–74
8	Byron Tucker	314	1990–91
9	Rudolph Jones	300	1971–72
10	Jim Nowers	288	1972–73

Single game
Rk	Player	Rebounds	Season	Opponent
1	Jim Nowers	24	1973–74	DC Teachers
2	Melvin Wedge	22	1972–73	UNCG
	Kenny Sanders	22	1988–89	American
4	Andre Gaddy	20	1980–81	Randolph Macon
5	Rudolph Jones	19	1972–73	York
	Steve Neal	19	1976–77	Shepherd
	Andre Gaddy	19	1979–80	Mercy
	Kenny Sanders	19	1985–86	American
	Kenny Sanders	19	1987–88	West Virginia
	Kenny Sanders	19	1988–89	UNC Wilmington
	Shevon Thompson	19	2014–15	New Mexico
	Marquise Moore	19	2016–17	Fordham

== Assists ==
Career
Rk	Player	Assists	Seasons
1	Curtis McCants	598	1993–94 1994–95 1995–96
2	Otis Livingston II	493	2015–16 2016–17 2017–18 2018–19
3	Myron Contee	411	1974–75 1975–76 1976–77 1977–78 1978–79
4	Ricky Wilson	405	1982–83 1983–84 1984–85 1985–86
5	Folarin Campbell	392	2004–05 2005–06 2006–07 2007–08
6	Bryon Allen	380	2010–11 2011–12 2012–13 2013–14
7	Marquise Moore	363	2013–14 2014–15 2015–16 2016–17
8	Cam Long	356	2007–08 2008–09 2009–10 2010–11
9	John Niehoff	331	1980–81 1981–82 1982–83 1983–84
10	Steve Smith	329	1986–87 1987–88 1988–89 1989–90

Season
Rk	Player	Assists	Season
1	Curtis McCants	251	1994–95
2	Curtis McCants	223	1995–96
3	Amp Davis	176	1987–88
4	Myron Contee	166	1975–76
5	Troy Manns	161	1993–94
6	Terry Reynolds	158	2003–04
7	Ricky Wilson	152	1984–85
8	Bryon Allen	151	2012–13
9	Otis Livingston II	144	2017–18
10	Luke Hancock	143	2010–11

Single game
Rk	Player	Assists	Season	Opponent
1	Curtis McCants	15	1994–95	Richmond
2	Curtis McCants	14	1995–96	Hampton
	Terry Reynolds	14	2003–04	Morehead State
4	Steve Smith	13	1989–90	Maryland
	Troy Manns	13	1993–94	St. Francis (NY)
	Curtis McCants	13	1994–95	Macalester
	Curtis McCants	13	1994–95	Old Dominion
	Curtis McCants	13	1994–95	Virginia
	Bryon Allen	13	2011–12	Northeastern
10	John Niehoff	12	1983–84	Monmouth
	Amp Davis	12	1987–88	Long Island
	Mike Hargett	12	1988–89	Navy
	Troy Manns	12	1993–94	Niagara
	Curtis McCants	12	1994–95	Charleston Southern
	Curtis McCants	12	1994–95	Troy State
	Curtis McCants	12	1994–95	James Madison
	Curtis McCants	12	1994–95	James Madison
	Curtis McCants	12	1995–96	Cal Poly SLO
	Curtis McCants	12	1995–96	Old Dominion

== Steals ==
Career
Rk	Player	Steals	Seasons
1	George Evans	218	1997–98 1998–99 1999–00 2000–01
2	Nate Langley	204	1994–95 1995–96 1996–97
3	Javon Greene	163	2017–18 2018–19 2019–20 2020–21
4	Rob Rose	161	1982–83 1983–84 1984–85 1985–86
5	John Niehoff	152	1980–81 1981–82 1982–83 1983–84
6	Myron Contee	151	1974–75 1975–76 1976–77 1977–78 1978–79
7	Cam Long	147	2007–08 2008–09 2009–10 2010–11
8	Erik Herring	146	1997–98 1998–99 1999–00 2000–01
9	Jai Lewis	140	2002–03 2003–04 2004–05 2005–06
10	Jon Larranaga	137	1999–2000 2000–01 2001–02 2002–03
	Corey Edwards	137	2011–12 2012–13 2013–14 2014–15

Season
Rk	Player	Steals	Season
1	Myron Contee	96	1978–79
2	Nate Langley	87	1994–95
3	Nate Langley	80	1996–97
4	George Evans	66	1998–99
5	John Niehoff	63	1983–84
6	Jason Miskiri	58	1998–99
7	George Evans	57	2000–01
8	Myron Contee	55	1977–78
	George Evans	55	1999–00
	Tony Skinn	55	2005–06
	Javon Greene	55	2019–20

Single game
Rk	Player	Steals	Season	Opponent
1	Tony Skinn	9	2005–06	Northeastern
2	Myron Contee	8	1978–79	Millersville
	Nate Langley	8	1994–95	William & Mary
	Nate Langley	8	1995–96	West Virginia Tech
	Nate Langley	8	1996–97	Long Beach State
	Jon Larranaga	8	2001–02	Coastal Carolina
7	Donald Ross	7	1993–94	St. Francis (NY)
	Nate Langley	7	1994–95	Richmond
	Nate Langley	7	1995–96	Ohio State
	Contrell Scott	7	1995–96	VCU
	Nate Langley	7	1996–97	St. Francis (PA)
	George Evans	7	1998–99	Richmond
	Mark Davis	7	2003–04	McNeese State

== Blocks ==
Career
Rk	Player	Blocks	Seasons
1	AJ Wilson	212	2017–18 2018–19 2019–20 2020–21
2	George Evans	211	1997–98 1998–99 1999–00 2000–01
3	Andre Gaddy	174	1977–78 1978–79 1979–80 1981–82
4	Mike Morrison	174	2008–09 2009–10 2010–11 2011–12
5	Erik Copes	122	2011–12 2012–13 2013–14
6	Josh Oduro	119	2019–20 2020–21 2021–22 2022–23
7	Robert Dykes	111	1987–88 1988–89 1989–90 1990–91
8	Rob Rose	106	1982–83 1983–84 1984–85 1985–86
9	Louis Birdsong	101	2006–07 2007–08 2008–09 2009–10
10	Byron Tucker	97	1989–90 1990–91 1991–92

Season
Rk	Player	Blocks	Season
1	AJ Wilson	92	2019–20
2	George Evans	77	1998–99
3	Mike Morrison	64	2011–12
4	Byron Tucker	55	1990–91
5	Mike Morrison	54	2009–10
6	Erik Copes	51	2011–12
7	George Evans	50	1999–00
	Keith Lewis	50	1977–78
9	Andre Gaddy	49	1977–78
	Mike Morrison	49	2009–10

Single game
Rk	Player	Blocks	Season	Opponent
1	Byron Tucker	10	1990–91	Miami (Fla.)
2	AJ Wilson	8	2017–18	CSUN
3	Erik Copes	7	2011–12	Drexel
	Mike Morrison	7	2009–10	Indiana
	George Evans	7	1998–99	Sacred Heart
	George Evans	7	1999–00	American
	Nick Ellington	7	2025–26	Jacksonville
7	Andre Gaddy	6	1979–80	Mercy
	Andre Gaddy	6	1981–82	Loyola
	Rob Rose	6	1984–85	UNC Wilmington
	Henri Abrams	6	1988–89	Bluefield
	Henri Abrams	6	1988–89	Wright State
	Mike Virtue	6	1995–96	William & Mary
	George Evans	6	1997–98	Old Dominion
	George Evans	6	1998–99	American
	Jesse Young	6	2001–02	Winthrop
	Jesse Young	6	2001–02	Old Dominion
	Mike Morrison	6	2009–10	Fairfield
	AJ Wilson	6	2018–19	Southern
	AJ Wilson	6	2019–20	Jacksonville State
	Josh Oduro	6	2019–20	Georgia
