= History of George Mason basketball =

George Mason Patriots
2018–19 George Mason Patriots men's basketball team
- University: George Mason University
- First season: 1966–67
- All-time record: 789–763 (.508)
- Head coach: Tony Skinn (1st season)
- Conference: Atlantic 10
- Location: Fairfax, Virginia
- Arena: EagleBank Arena (capacity: 10,000)
- Nickname: Patriots
- Student section: Patriot Platoon
- Colors: Green and gold

Uniforms
Home	Away

NCAA tournament Final Four
- 2006
Other NCAA tournament results
Elite Eight	2006
Sweet Sixteen	2006
Appearances	1989, 1999, 2001, 2006, 2008, 2011

Conference tournament champions
- 1989, 1999, 2001, 2008

Conference regular-season champions
- 1999, 2000, 2006, 2011

George Mason Patriots men's basketball program dates to 1966. Basketball and athletics as a whole have contributed significantly to George Mason's popularity and success. The Patriots are the mascot and logo of George Mason University. The Patriots home court for both the men and women is at the EagleBank Arena, which is in Fairfax Virginia. The Patriots compete in the Atlantic 10 Conference. Until 2012–13, they competed in the Colonial Athletic Association, better known as the CAA. Both conferences are part of NCAA Division I sports. The men's team is coached by Tony Skinn. The women's team is coached by Nyla Milleson.

== History ==
The Patriots made a transition from the National Association of Intercollegiate Athletics NAIA to the National Collegiate Athletic Association NCAA Division II, and subsequently into the NCAA Division I rank in the 1978–79 season. According to the history of George Mason basketball, both the men's and women's basketball programs have been fixtures of campus life, and have all been enjoyed by students, parents, faculty, staff, other alumni. Although many of the school's athletic programs are enjoyed by George Mason Patriots and have had many of their own memorable moments, the men's basketball program remains the key sport at the University. The men's basketball team has played at the Patriot Center since 1985, and in prior years played at the PE Building on the west side of the Fairfax Campus. George Mason has sent 3 players to the NBA since 1979. Those being Rob Rose, Ricky Wilson, and Jason Miskiri. George Mason has had numerous basketball players pursue post-college basketball careers overseas over the years, with many George Mason basketball alums still currently continuing their basketball careers overseas.

=== NCAA Tournament appearances ===
Men's

- Basketball (6), 1989, 1999, 2001, 2006, 2008 2011.

The Patriots have advanced to the NCAA tournament six times (1989, 1999, 2001, 2006, 2008, and 2011) and the NIT tournament (National Invitation tournament) three times (1986, 2002 and 2004). The basketball team is best known for its 2006 NCAA Final Four appearance where Mason beat North Carolina, Connecticut, Michigan State, and Wichita State. The Patriots lost to the eventual champion Florida in the Final Four. After the Patriots run in the 2005–2006 season, and their successful finish in the 2007–2008 season, George Mason Head Coach Jim Larranaga was offered to leave Mason for a 5-year, $4.25 million offer from Providence College. Coach Larranaga announced his decision in April 2008 by declining the offer from Providence, and extending his current contract with Mason to 2015.

=== Final Four ===
George Mason celebrated the 2005–2006 basketball campaign, when they set a school-record by winning 27 games, going 27–8 on the year. That season the patriots were ranked top 25 in the USA Today and ESPN polls for the very first time. George Mason was ranked #8 in the final NCAA Basketball polls that year, making that Mason's highest ever ranking in men's basketball. George Mason was nominated for 2 ESPY awards by ESPN. The Patriots were nominated for an ESPY in the category of "Best Moment," for making the Final Four after downing three highly favored opponents. The run to the Final Four, which ESPN says is "considered by most the greatest in NCAA Tournament history", culminated with the Patriots beating top-seeded Connecticut 86–84 in overtime on March 26 to advance to the school, and the CAA conference's first-ever Final Four. George Mason also defeated Michigan State, North Carolina, and Wichita State in the NCAA Tournament while defeating the University of Connecticut in the Elite 8 to earn a trip to the Final Four in Indianapolis. George Mason would later fall to the eventual National Champion, University of Florida, in the Final Four game. While the Patriots were nominated for their virtuoso performance, the man who helped conduct the orchestra was also nominated for an ESPY as George Mason head men's basketball coach Jim Larranaga was nominated in the "Best Coach/Manager" category.

After the 2005–2006 season Head coach Jim Larranaga was named Virginia Coach of the Year on June 26, 2006. George Mason was one of only three teams since 1982 without a tournament win in its school history to still enter the final four. Georgia did it in 1983, and Virginia did it in 1981. During the 2005–2006 season the final four had a bigger following than the Super Bowl and the NBA Playoffs that year. The main following came from office pools and parties in houses, dorms, and bars.

== George Mason women's basketball ==
In 2008, news broke out that women's basketball coach Debbie Taneyhill decided to resign to pursue other opportunities. Coach Taneyhill spent 11 seasons as Mason's women's basketball head coach and had much success with the ladies. During Taneyhill's tenure as coach, she helped the lady Patriots to four-straight winning campaigns, from the 2000 to the 2004 season. She also led them to two post-season appearances in the Women's National Invitation Tournament, WNIT in 2001 and 2004, and was named 2001 Colonial Athletic Association Coach of the Year. She was the sixth coach in George Mason's 33-year history and was the only head coach to have 10 or more wins in each of her first eight seasons. She led the Patriots to the 2004 CAA Championship title game for just the third time in school history. Taneyhill ranks second all-time among Mason coaches in both wins and games coached. During the 2005–2006 season George Mason University was selected to host the Colonial Athletic Association Women's Basketball Championship, to be played at the Patriot Center. It was the first time that George Mason served as host to the women's championship. In 2003 Mason Guard Jen Derevjanik advanced to the WNBA (Women's National Basketball Association). Derevjanik is one of few players ever in Mason's history to play in the WNBA. Jen wrapped up her second season with the WNBA's Connecticut Sun in 2005, where the Sun's competed in the WNBA finals for the second straight season. Derevjanik is the first Mason player to be part of a team that has advanced to the WNBA Finals.

== Players ==
=== Notable player accomplishments ===
CAA PLAYER OF THE YEAR

- 1983 – Carlos Yates (Co-Player)
- 1988 – Kenny Sanders
- 1999 – George Evans
- 2000 – George Evans
- 2001 – George Evans
- 2012 – Ryan Pearson

CAA ROOKIE OF THE YEAR

- 1980 – Andy Bolden
- 1982 – Carlos Yates
- 1986 – Kenny Sanders
- 1994 – Curtis McCants
- 1995 – Nate Langley
- 1998 – George Evans

ALL-CAA (ECAC South Conf., 1980–85)

- 1980 – Andre Gaddy
- 1982 – Carlos Yates
- 1983 – Carlos Yates
- 1984 – Carlos Yates, Ricky Wilson
- 1985 – Carlos Yates, Rob Rose (2nd), Ricky Wilson (2nd)
- 1986 – Rob Rose, Ricky Wilson (2nd)
- 1987 – Kenny Sanders
- 1988 – Kenny Sanders, Amp Davos (2nd)
- 1989 – Kenny Sanders
- 1990 – Robert Dykes, Mike Hargett (2nd), Steve Smith (2nd)
- 1991 – Robert Dykes, Byron Tucker (2nd)
- 1995 – Nate Langley (2nd)
- 1996 – Curtis McCants
- 1997 – Nate Langley
- 1998 – George Evans (2nd), Jason Miskiri (2nd)
- 1999 – George Evans, Jason Miskiri
- 2000 – George Evans, Erik Herring (2nd)
- 2001 – George Evans, Erik Herring
- 2002 – Jesse Young
- 2003 – Mark Davis (2nd)
- 2004 – Jai Lewis, Mark Davis (2nd)
- 2005 – Jai Lewis (2nd), Lamar Butler (2nd), Tony Skinn (3rd)
- 2006 – Jai Lewis, Tony Skinn (2nd)
- 2007 – Will Thomas (2nd), Folarin Campbell (3rd)
- 2008 – Will Thomas, Folarin Campbell (2nd)
- 2009 – John Vaughan (2nd), Darryl Monroe (2nd), Cam Long (3rd)
- 2010 – Cam Long (2nd)
- 2011 – Cam Long (1st), Ryan Pearson (2nd), Luke Hancock (3rd)

== Statistics ==
=== All-time leaders ===
==== Points ====
Rank	Player	Years	Games	PPG avg.	Total points
1	Carlos Yates	1981–1985	109	22.2	2420
2	Kenny Sanders	1985–1989	107	20.3	2177
3	George Evans	1997–2001	116	16.8	1953
4	Robert Dykes	1987–1991	122	13.4	1642
5	Andre Gaddy	1977–1982	98	16.0	1568
6	Rob Rose	1982–1986	113	13.8	1565
7	Will Thomas	2004–2008	131	11.9	1564
8	Folarin Campbell	2004–2008	130	11.9	1545
9	Rudolph Jones	1971–1973	59	25.8	1525
10	Jai Lewis	2002–2006	125	12.2	1519

==== Rebounds ====
Rank	Player	Years	Games	Reb. Avg.	Total Rebounds
1	Jim Nowers	1972–1976	112	9.4	1048
2	Kenny Sanders	1985–1989	107	9.6	1026
3	Will Thomas	2004–2008	131	7.6	993
4	George Evans	1997–2001	116	8.2	953
5	Robert Dykes	1987–1991	122	7.5	925
6	Andre Gaddy	1977–1982	98	9.3	916
7	Jai Lewis	2002–2006	125	7.2	895
8	Rob Rose	1982–1986	113	7.1	805
9	Herb Estes	1973–1976	80	9.2	734
10	Jesse Young	1999–2003	115	6.2	708

==== Assists ====
Rank	Player	Years	Games	Ast. Avg.	Total Assists
1	Curtis McCants	1993–1996	81	7.3	598
2	Myron Contee	1974–1979	101	4.0	411
3	Ricky Wilson	1982–1986	116	3.4	405
4	Folarin Campbell	2004–2008	130	3.0	392
5	John Niehoff	1980–1984	108	3.0	331
6	Steve Smith	1986–1990	114	2.8	329
7	Mike Hargett	1988–1991	93	3.3	312
8	Tremaine Price	1997–2001	110	2.8	308
9	Raoul Heinen	2000–2004	109	2.7	290
10	Jamel Perkins	1989–1993	97	2.9	283

=== Men's All-time standings ===
Statistics overview
Season	Coach	Overall	Conference	Standing	Postseason
(Independent) (1966–1979)
1966–1967	Arnold Siegfried	6–12			
1967–1968	Raymond Spuhler	5–17			
1968–1969	Raymond Spuhler	2–20			
1969–1970	Raymond Spuhler	4–23			
1970–1971	John Linn	9–17			
1971–1972	John Linn	12–18			
1972–1973	John Linn	15–16			
1973–1974	John Linn	19–10			
1974–1975	John Linn	19–8			
1975–1976	John Linn	16–13			
1976–1977	John Linn	9–18			
1977–1978	John Linn	5–21			
1978–1979	John Linn	17–8			Inaugural Division I season
George Mason (Eastern College Athletic Conference) (1979–1985)
1979–1980	John Linn	5–21			
1980–1981	Joe Harrington	10–16			
1981–1982	Joe Harrington	13–14			
1982–1983	Joe Harrington	15–12	3–6	4th	
1983–1984	Joe Harrington	21–7	5–5	T-4th	
1984–1985	Joe Harrington	18–11	10–4	3rd	
George Mason (Colonial Athletic Association) (1985–2013)
1985–1986	Joe Harrington	20–12	10–4	3rd	NIT 2nd Round
1986–1987	Joe Harrington	15–13	7–7	5th	
1987–1988	Rick Barnes	20–10	10–5	2nd	
1988–1989	Ernie Nestor	20–11	11–4	2nd	NCAA 1st Round
1989–1990	Ernie Nestor	20–12	11–5	4th	
1990–1991	Ernie Nestor	14–16	10–7	4th	
1991–1992	Ernie Nestor	7–21	3–11	8th	
1992–1993	Ernie Nestor	7–21	2–11	8th	
1993–1994	Paul Westhead	10–17	5–9	6th	
1994–1995	Paul Westhead	7–20	2–12	8th	
1995–1996	Paul Westhead	11–16	6–10	T-6th	
1996–1997	Jim Larranaga	10–17	4–12	9th	
1997–1998	Jim Larranaga	9–18	6–10	T-5th	
1998–1999	Jim Larranaga	19–11	13–3	1st	NCAA 1st Round
1999–2000	Jim Larranaga	19–11	12–4	T-1st	
2000–2001	Jim Larranaga	18–12	11–5	T-2nd	NCAA 1st Round
2001–2002	Jim Larranaga	19–10	13–5	2nd	NIT Opening Round
2002–2003	Jim Larranaga	16–12	11–7	4th	
2003–2004	Jim Larranaga	23–10	12–6	3rd	NIT 2nd Round
2004–2005	Jim Larranaga	16–13	10–8	6th	
2005–2006	Jim Larranaga	27–8	15–3	T-1st	NCAA Final Four
2006–2007	Jim Larranaga	18–15	9–9	T-5th	
2007–2008	Jim Larranaga	23–11	12–6	3rd	NCAA 1st Round
2008–2009	Jim Larranaga	22–11	13–5	2nd	NIT 1st Round
2009–2010	Jim Larranaga	17–15	12–6	4th	CIT 1st Round
2010–2011	Jim Larranaga	27–7	16–2	1st	NCAA 3rd Round
2011–2012	Paul Hewitt	24–9	14–4	3rd	
2012–2013	Paul Hewitt	21–14	10–8	5th	CBI Runner Up
George Mason (Atlantic 10 Conference) (2013–Present)
2013–2014	Paul Hewitt	11–20	4–12	11th	
2014–2015	Paul Hewitt	9–22	4–10	13th	
2015–2016	Dave Paulsen	11–21	5–13	12th	
2016–2017	Dave Paulsen	20–14	9–9	7th	CBI 1st Round
2017–2018	Dave Paulsen	16–17	9–9	T-5th	
2018–2019	Dave Paulsen	18–15	11–7	5th	
Total:		789–763			
National champion Postseason invitational champion Conference regular season champion Conference regular season and conference tournament champion Division regular season champion Division regular season and conference tournament champion Conference tournament champion
