= 2000–01 George Mason Patriots men's basketball team =

American college basketball season

2000–01 George Mason Patriots men's basketball

CAA tournament champions

NCAA tournament, first round
- Conference: Colonial Athletic Association
- Record: 18-12 (11-5 CAA)
- Head coach: Jim Larrañaga (4th season)
- Assistant coaches: Scott Cherry; Bill Courtney; Mike Gillian
- Home arena: Patriot Center

The 2000–01 George Mason Patriots Men's basketball team represented George Mason University during the 2000–01 NCAA Division I men's basketball season. This was the 35th season for the program, the fourth under head coach Jim Larrañaga. The Patriots played their home games at the Patriot Center in Fairfax, Virginia.

The Patriots won the CAA tournament by defeating UNC Wilmington in the final.

== Honors and awards ==
Colonial Athletic Association Player of the Year

- George Evans

Colonial Athletic Association All-Conference First Team

- George Evans
- Erik Herring

Colonial Athletic Association Defensive Player of the Year

- George Evans

Colonial Athletic Association All-Defensive Team

- George Evans

Colonial Athletic Association Dean Ehlers Award

- George Evans

AP All-America Team - Honorable Mention

- George Evans

== Roster ==
2000–01 George Mason Patriots men's basketball team
Players
Coaches

Pos.	#	Name	Height	Weight	Year	Previous school	Hometown
F	2	Jon Larranaga	6 ft 7 in (2.01 m)	230 lb (104 kg)	So	St. John's Catholic Prep	Oakton, VA
F	3	Jesse Young	6 ft 10 in (2.08 m)	250 lb (113 kg)	So	Peterborough Collegiate	Peterborough, Canada
G	4	Raoul Heinen	6 ft 5 in (1.96 m)	200 lb (91 kg)	Fr	Callant Lyceum	Bunschoten, Netherlands
G	5	Tremaine Price	5 ft 8 in (1.73 m)	150 lb (68 kg)	Sr	Parkdale	Landover, MD
G	12	Richard Tynes	6 ft 4 in (1.93 m)	205 lb (93 kg)	Fr	Hargrave Military Academy	Washington, DC
F	21	George Evans	6 ft 7 in (2.01 m)	225 lb (102 kg)	Sr	I.C. Norcom	Portsmouth, VA
G	23	Rob Sullivan	6 ft 0 in (1.83 m)	165 lb (75 kg)	Fr	Maplewood, NJ
F	24	Rob Anderson	6 ft 5 in (1.96 m)	210 lb (95 kg)	Jr	Wakefield	Arlington, VA
F	34	Terrance Nixon	6 ft 6 in (1.98 m)	225 lb (102 kg)	Jr	Oxon Hill	Oxon Hill, MD
G	40	Jeff Palumbo	5 ft 9 in (1.75 m)	155 lb (70 kg)	Fr	St. John's College HS	Bowie, MD
F	41	Deon Cooper	6 ft 9 in (2.06 m)	235 lb (107 kg)	Fr	Columbia Central	Columbia, TN
G	44	Erik Herring	6 ft 5 in (1.96 m)	200 lb (91 kg)	Sr	Thornton	Chicago, IL

Head coach

- Jim Larrañaga (Providence)

Assistant coach(es)

- Scott Cherry (North Carolina)
- Bill Courtney (Bucknell)
- Mike Gillian (North Adams State)

Legend

- (C) Team captain
- (S) Suspended
- (I) Ineligible
- (W) Walk-on
- Injured
- Current redshirt

== Player statistics ==
Player	GP	GS	FG%	3FG%	FT%	RPG	APG	SPG	BPG	PPG
George Evans	30	29	.613	.000	.612	7.8	1.9	1.9	1.5	18.4
Erik Herring	30	30	.434	.402	.717	3.7	2.4	1.3	0.6	16.0
Jesse Young	30	30	.557	.000	.671	5.9	0.5	0.6	0.9	8.2
Jon Larranaga	30	22	.445	.000	.717	4.9	1.6	1.7	0.3	8.0
Tremaine Price	30	30	.328	.337	.683	1.9	4.7	1.3	0.0	7.5
Rob Anderson	27	8	.316	.267	.583	2.3	0.9	0.7	0.6	4.8
Raoul Heinen	22	0	.400	.174	.529	1.3	0.6	0.5	0.0	3.1
Terrance Nixon	29	1	.436	.333	.529	2.0	0.5	0.1	0.1	2.8
Rob Sullivan	23	0	.429	.409	.600	0.4	0.6	0.4	0.0	2.2
Deon Cooper	22	0	.588	.000	.571	0.5	0.0	0.1	0.3	1.1
Richard Tynes	30	0	.275	.091	.222	1.1	0.3	0.3	0.1	1.1
Jeff Palumbo	2	0	.000	.000	.000	0.5	0.5	0.0	0.0	0.0

== Schedule and results ==
Date time, TV	Rank^{#}	Opponent^{#}	Result	Record	High points	High rebounds	High assists	Site (attendance) city, state
Non-conference regular season
November 13, 2000*; 9:00 pm		at New Mexico; Preseason NIT	L 68–79	0–1	28 – Herring	4 – Evans/Young	3 – Evans/Price	The Pit (15,156); Albuquerque, NM
November 20, 2000*; 7:00 pm		at Drexel	W 80–72	1–1	26 – Herring	9 – Evans	6 – Price	Daskalakis Athletic Center (1,837); Philadelphia, PA
November 25, 2000*; 7:30 pm		Delaware	W 72–65	2–1	20 – Evans	12 – Larranaga	3 – Herring/Price	Patriot Center (2,108); Fairfax, VA
November 28, 2000*; 7:30 pm		at Coppin State	W 75–54	3–1	23 – Evans	6 – Young	4 – Price	Coppin Center (456); Baltimore, MD
December 2, 2000*; 7:00 pm		at Toledo	L 75–84	3–2	22 – Evans	9 – Evans	4 – Herring/Tynes	Savage Hall (4,777); Toledo, OH
December 6, 2000; 7:00 pm		at American	W 65–54	4–2 (1–0)	18 – Evans	10 – Evans	5 – Price	Bender Arena (617); Washington, DC
December 9, 2000; 7:00 pm		at James Madison	W 65–54	5–2 (2–0)	14 – Young	9 – Young	5 – Price	JMU Convocation Center (4,011); Harrisonburg, VA
December 20, 2000*; 7:00 pm		Coastal Carolina	W 81–65	6–2	27 – Evans	7 – Evans	8 – Herring	Patriot Center (1,523); Fairfax, VA
December 22, 2000*; 7:00 pm		Miami (OH)	W 64–50	7–2	22 – Evans	10 – Evans	6 – Price	Patriot Center (2,011); Fairfax, VA
December 29, 2000*; 9:00 pm		at Santa Clara; Cable Car Classic	L 76–78 ^{OT}	7–3	22 – Herring	12 – Evans	6 – Larranaga	Leavey Center (3,684); Santa Clara, CA
December 30, 2000*; 9:00 pm		vs. Fordham; Cable Car Classic	L 55–64	7–4	17 – Evans	14 – Evans	8 – Price	Leavey Center (3,757); Santa Clara, CA
CAA regular season
January 3, 2001; 7:00 pm		Richmond	W 67–57	8–4 (3–0)	14 – Evans/Young	9 – Evans	3 – Evans/Herring	Patriot Center (1,826); Fairfax, VA
January 6, 2001; 4:30 pm		UNC Wilmington	L 53–57	8–5 (3–1)	16 – Evans	14 – Evans	3 – Larranaga/Price	Patriot Center (1,984); Fairfax, VA
January 10, 2001; 7:30 pm		at VCU; Rivalry	L 65–72	8–6 (3–2)	26 – Evans	10 – Evans	4 – Herring	Siegel Center (4,015); Richmond, VA
January 13, 2001; 7:00 pm		Old Dominion	W 81–76	9–6 (4–2)	23 – Herring	12 – Evans	4 – Herring/Price	Patriot Center (3,419); Fairfax, VA
January 17, 2001; 7:00pm		William & Mary	W 73–64	10–6 (5–2)	15 – Evans	4 – Anderson/Larranaga	7 – Price	William & Mary Hall (2,628); Williamsburg, VA
January 20, 2001*; 4:00 pm		at Fairfield	L 86–95	10–7	24 – Evans	10 – Evans	8 – Price	Alumni Hall (2,377); Fairfield, CT
January 22, 2001; 7:00 pm		East Carolina	W 104–62	11–7 (6–2)	26 – Evans	8 – Evans/Young	11 – Price	Patriot Center (1,778); Fairfax, VA
January 27, 2001; 4:30 pm		at American	W 84–56	12–7 (7–2)	25 – Evans	9 – Young	7 – Price	Patriot Center (6,373); Fairfax, VA
January 29, 2001*; 7:00 pm		at Detroit	L 54–67	12–8	18 – Herring	11 – Young	2 – Evans/Herring/Sullivan	Calihan Hall (2,024); Detroit, MI
February 3, 2001; 4:00 pm		at East Carolina	W 77–74	13–8 (8–2)	22 – Evans	7 – Young	5 – Price	Williams Arena (6,429); Greenville NC
February 5, 2001; 7:00 pm		at UNC Wilmington	L 42–50	13–9 (8–3)	14 – Evans	12 – Young	3 – Evans	Trask Coliseum (4,455); Wilmington, NC
February 10, 2001; 7:00 pm		William & Mary	W 84–62	14–9 (9–3)	23 – Evans	6 – Larranaga	6 – Price	Patriot Center (4,131); Fairfax, VA
February 14, 2001; 7:00 pm		VCU; Rivalry	W 99–79	15–9 (10–3)	30 – Evans	10 – Evans/Young	10 – Price	Patriot Center (2,041); Fairfax, VA
February 17, 2001; 4:00 pm		James Madison	W 79–66	16–9 (11–3)	30 – Herring	7 – Herring	6 – Price	Patriot Center (9,702); Fairfax, VA
February 21, 2001; 7:35 pm		at Old Dominion	L 70–78	16–10 (11–4)	27 – Herring	7 – Evans	7 – Price	ODU Fieldhouse (3,191); Norfolk, VA
February 24, 2001; 1:00 pm		at Richmond	L 57–77	16–11 (11–5)	16 – Evans	8 – Young	3 – Herring/Price	Robins Center (5,209); Richmond, VA
2001 CAA tournament
March 4, 2001; 3:30 pm	(2)	vs. (6) James Madison; Semifinals	W 62–36	17–11	16 – Herring	5 – Herring	4 – Sullivan	Richmond Coliseum (4,226); Richmond, VA
March 5, 2001; 7:30 pm	(2)	vs. (1) UNC Wilmington; Championship	W 35–33	18–11	12 – Herring	11 – Evans	3 – Price	Richmond Coliseum (5,085); Richmond, VA
2001 NCAA tournament
March 15, 2001; 3:10 pm	(14 W)	vs. (3 W) No. 11 Maryland; First Round	L 80–83	18–12	27 – Evans	9 – Young	6 – Price	BSU Pavilion (10,824); Boise, ID
*Non-conference game. ^{#}Rankings from AP Poll. (#) Tournament seedings in parentheses. All times are in Eastern Time.
