= 1994–95 George Mason Patriots men's basketball team =

American college basketball season

1994–95 George Mason Patriots men's basketball
- Conference: Colonial Athletic Association
- Record: 7–20 (2–12 CAA)
- Head coach: Paul Westhead (2nd season)
- Home arena: Patriot Center

1994–95 CAA men's basketball standings
	Conf.				Overall
Team	W		L	PCT	W		L	PCT
Old Dominion †	12	–	2	.857	21	–	12	.636
UNC Wilmington	10	–	4	.714	16	–	11	.593
James Madison	9	–	5	.643	16	–	13	.552
East Carolina	7	–	7	.500	18	–	11	.621
American	7	–	7	.500	9	–	19	.321
William & Mary	6	–	8	.429	8	–	19	.296
Richmond	3	–	11	.214	8	–	20	.286
George Mason	2	–	12	.143	7	–	20	.259
† 1995 CAA tournament winner Rankings from AP poll

The 1994–95 George Mason Patriots Men's basketball team represented George Mason University during the 1994–95 NCAA Division I men's basketball season. This was the 29th season for the program, the second under head coach Paul Westhead. The Patriots played their home games at the Patriot Center in Fairfax, Virginia.

== Honors and awards ==
Nate Langley

- CAA Second-team All-Conference
- CAA All-Defensive Team
- CAA Rookie of the Year
- CAA All-Rookie Team

== Player statistics ==
Player	GP	FG%	3FG%	FT%	RPG	APG	SPG	BPG	PPG
Nate Langley	26	.483	.250	.617	4.0	2.5	3.3	0.2	19.5
Curtis McCants	27	.435	.360	.801	3.2	9.3	1.0	0.0	15.2
Kevin Ward	27	.507	.000	.739	6.7	0.2	0.6	0.3	12.7
G.C. Maracacci	24	.386	.310	.792	4.6	0.7	1.3	0.2	11.8
Kenwan Alford	27	.559	.000	.455	6.0	0.7	1.4	0.5	10.5
Pharoah Davis	27	.403	.421	.627	5.8	0.3	0.7	0.3	7.7
Andrew Fingall	27	.430	.316	.524	6.1	0.9	0.6	0.9	5.6
Donald Ross	23	.271	.276	.760	0.8	1.0	0.4	0.0	5.6
Riley Trone	27	.307	.317	.727	1.4	0.8	0.6	0.0	5.2
Bernard Wanjara	20	.500	.000	.368	2.1	0.1	0.1	1.0	1.7
Michael Sharp	2	.333	1.000	.000	2.0	0.5	0.5	0.0	1.5
Mark McGlone	8	.500	.000	.714	1.5	0.1	0.0	0.1	1.4
DeRhonde Hairston	8	.000	.000	.000	0.5	0.8	0.0	0.0	0.0
Mike Myers	2	.000	.000	.000	0.0	0.0	0.0	0.0	0.0

== Schedule and results ==
Date time, TV	Rank^{#}	Opponent^{#}	Result	Record	Site city, state
Non-conference regular season
November 26, 1994*		Charleston Southern	W 97–95	1–0	Patriot Center; Fairfax, VA
November 29, 1994*		Macalester (Div. III)	W 140–99	2–0	Patriot Center; Fairfax, VA
December 3, 1994*		LSU	L 104–127	2–1	Pete Maravich Assembly Center; Baton Rouge, LA
December 6, 1994*		North Carolina A&T	W 98–90 ^{2OT}	3–1	Patriot Center; Fairfax, VA
December 10, 1994*		Troy State	W 148–132	4–1	Patriot Center; Fairfax, VA
December 22, 1994*		at No. 2 UCLA	L 100–137	4–2	Pauley Pavilion; Los Angeles, CA
December 28, 1994*		Mississippi Valley State	W 84–80	5–2	Patriot Center; Fairfax, VA
December 30, 1994*		New Hampshire	L 78–99	5–3	Patriot Center; Fairfax, VA
January 3, 1995*		at VCU; Rivalry	L 85–108	5–4	Richmond Coliseum; Richmond, VA
January 5, 1995*		at Niagara	L 92–100	5–5	Gallagher Center; Lewiston, NY
January 8, 1995*		at Ohio State	L 96–121	5–6	St. John Arena; Columbus, OH
CAA regular season
January 11, 1995		at James Madison	L 97–110	5–7 (0–1)	JMU Convocation Center; Harrisonburg, VA
January 14, 1995		Old Dominion	L 83–88	5–8 (0–2)	Patriot Center; Fairfax, VA
January 18, 1995		William & Mary	L 82–85	5–9 (0–3)	Patriot Center; Fairfax, VA
January 21, 1996		East Carolina	L 70–84	5–10 (0–4)	Patriot Center; Fairfax, VA
January 23, 1995		UNC Wilimington	L 64–86	5–11 (0–5)	Patriot Center; Fairfax, VA
January 25, 1995		American	L 89–108	5–12 (0–6)	Patriot Center; Fairfax, VA
January 28, 1995*		at No. 15 Virginia	L 98–128	5–13	University Hall; Charlottesville, VA
February 1, 1995		at Richmond	W 92–86	6–13 (1–6)	Robins Center; Richmond, VA
February 4, 1995		at UNC Wilmington	L 63–83	6–14 (1–7)	Trask Coliseum; Wilmington, NC
February 6, 1995		at East Carolina	L 82–84	6–15 (1–8)	Minges Coliseum; Greenville, NC
February 13, 1995		at Old Dominion	L 70–94	6–16 (1–9)	Norfolk Scope; Norfolk, VA
February 18, 1995		James Madison	W 98–94	7–16 (2–9)	Patriot Center; Fairfax, VA
February 22, 1995		Richmond	L 100–101	7–17 (2–10)	Patriot Center; Fairfax, VA
February 25, 1995		at American	L 101–103	7–18 (2–11)	Bender Arena; Washington, DC
February 27, 1995		at William & Mary	L 94–116	7–19 (2–12)	William & Mary Hall; Williamsburg, VA
1995 CAA tournament
March 4, 1995	(8)	vs. (1) Old Dominion; Quarterfinals	L 94–110	7–20	Richmond Coliseum; Richmond, VA
*Non-conference game. ^{#}Rankings from AP Poll. (#) Tournament seedings in parentheses. All times are in Eastern Time.
