= Justin Kier =

American basketball player (born 1998)

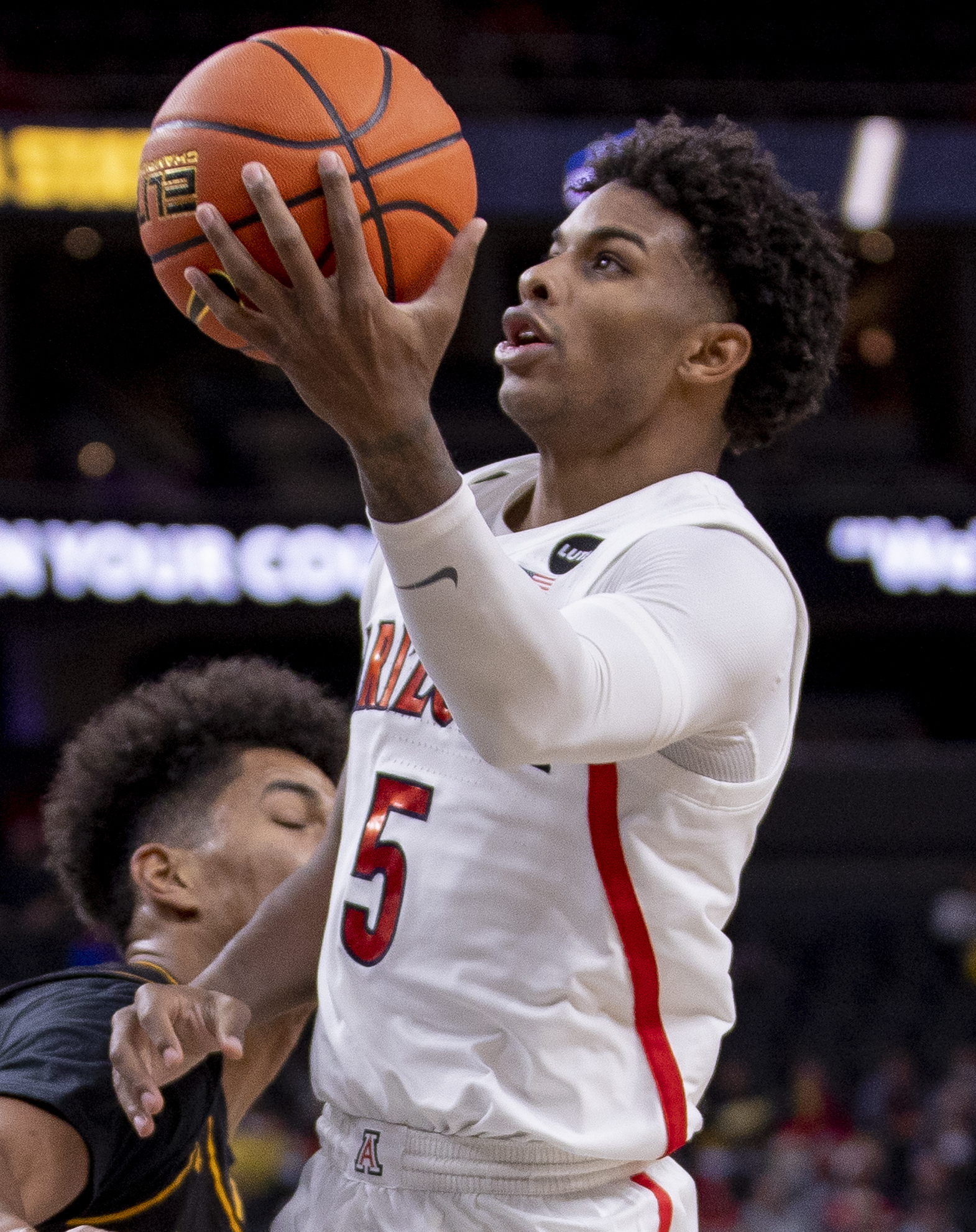
- Kier with Arizona in 2021

No. 1 – MHP Riesen Ludwigsburg
- Position: Shooting guard
- League: BBL

Personal information
- Born: May 30, 1998 (age 28)
- Listed height: 6 ft 4 in (1.93 m)
- Listed weight: 195 lb (88 kg)

Career information
- High school: Spotswood (Penn Laird, Virginia)
- College: George Mason (2016–2020); Georgia (2020–2021); Arizona (2021–2022)
- NBA draft: 2022: undrafted
- Playing career: 2022–present

Career history
- 2022–2024: Austin Spurs
- 2024–2025: Heroes Den Bosch
- 2025–2026: Apollon Patras
- 2026–present: Riesen Ludwigsburg

Career highlights
- Dutch League champion (2025); Dutch Cup winner (2025); Second-team All-Atlantic 10 (2019); Atlantic 10 Most Improved Player (2019)

Justin Kier (born May 30, 1998) is an American professional basketball player for Riesen Ludwigsburg of the Basketball Bundesliga (BBL). He played college basketball for the Arizona Wildcats of the Pac-12 Conference. He also played for the George Mason Patriots and the Georgia Bulldogs.

== High school career ==
Kier attended Spotswood High School. In his career, he scored 1700 points for Spotswood and earned Valley District Player of the Year honors. He committed to George Mason over scholarship offers from Coastal Carolina, UNC Greensboro, Radford and Fairfield.

== College career ==
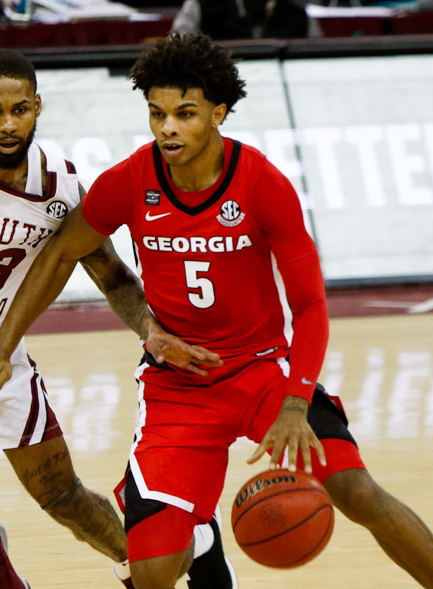
Kier with Georgia in 2021

Kier made an immediate impact at George Mason as a freshman, averaging 5.8 points and 4.5 rebounds per game. He averaged 11.0 points, 4.6 rebounds and 2.3 assists per game as a sophomore. On December 3, 2018, he scored a career-high 32 points in a 72–67 loss to Vermont. As a junior, Kier averaged 14.5 points and 6.5 rebounds per game while shooting 47.1 percent from the field. He was named to the Second Team All-Atlantic 10 as well as the Atlantic 10 Most Improved Player. He suffered a stress fracture in the offseason that caused him to miss the first six games of his senior season. Kier missed a game with an unrelated injury in December 2019. On January 15, 2020, he reinjured his stress fracture which caused him to miss the remainder of the season. In nine games, he averaged 9.6 points and 3.6 rebounds per game.

On April 8, 2020, Kier decided to enter the transfer portal after being granted a fifth season of eligibility. He announced he was transferring to Georgia on April 26 and will be eligible immediately as a graduate transfer. Kier chose the Bulldogs over offers from Minnesota and NC State. He averaged 9.5 points, 3.7 rebounds, 2.4 assists and 1.7 steals per game while shooting 39.4 percent from the field. Kier transferred to Arizona Wildcats for his final season of eligibility. Kier led his team to the Sweet 16 in the 2022 March Madnes, where they lost to the Houston Cougars 72–60.

== Professional career ==
=== Austin Spurs (2022–2024) ===
After going undrafted in the 2022 NBA draft, Kier joined the Austin Spurs on October 24, 2022.

=== Heroes Den Bosch (2024–2025) ===
On July 18, 2024, Kier signed with Heroes Den Bosch of the BNXT League. On March 23, 2025, Kier and Heroes won the 2024–25 Dutch Basketball Cup.

=== Riesen Ludwigsburg (2026–present) ===
July 3, 2026, Kier signed with MHP Riesen Ludwigsburg of the German Basketball Bundesliga (BBL).

== Career statistics ==
Legend
GP	Games played	GS	Games started	MPG	Minutes per game
FG%	Field goal percentage	3P%	3-point field goal percentage	FT%	Free throw percentage
RPG	Rebounds per game	APG	Assists per game	SPG	Steals per game
BPG	Blocks per game	PPG	Points per game	**Bold**	Career high

=== College ===
Year	Team	GP	GS	MPG	FG%	3P%	FT%	RPG	APG	SPG	BPG	PPG
2016–17	George Mason	33	29	27.7	.428	.386	.744	4.5	1.1	.6	.2	5.8
2017–18	George Mason	33	**32**	33.2	.451	.174	.784	4.6	2.3	1.3	.1	11.0
2018–19	George Mason	33	31	**34.8**	**.471**	.371	.769	**6.5**	**2.6**	1.6	**.3**	**14.5**
2019–20	George Mason	9	2	22.6	.464	**.458**	**.846**	3.6	1.3	.7	.2	9.6
2020–21	Georgia	25	25	31.0	.394	.366	.750	3.7	2.4	**1.7**	.1	9.5
2021–22	Arizona	**36**	6	20.1	.444	.358	.830	3.1	2.3	.6	.0	6.9
Career		169	125	28.8	.444	.351	.781	4.4	2.1	1.1	.2	9.5

== Personal life ==
At the age of seven, Kier's mother Keley suffered a heart attack while driving a car, crashed into a tree and is now paralyzed, blind and cannot speak. Kier was in the automobile with her but was not injured, escaping through a window. As a consequence of the accident and with his father not in his life, Kier and his older brother, Rasheed, came into the custody of their grandmother, Evelyn. Kier grew up in Grottoes, VA and is considered one of the best players to come out of the Shenandoah Valley in recent years.

== See also ==
- List of NCAA Division I men's basketball career games played leaders
