= 1993–94 George Mason Patriots men's basketball team =

American college basketball season

1993–94 George Mason Patriots men's basketball
- Conference: Colonial Athletic Association
- Record: 10–17 (5–9 CAA)
- Head coach: Paul Westhead (1st season)
- Home arena: Patriot Center

The 1993–94 George Mason Patriots Men's basketball team represented George Mason University during the 1993–94 NCAA Division I men's basketball season. This was the 28th season for the program, the first under head coach Paul Westhead. The Patriots played their home games at the Patriot Center in Fairfax, Virginia.

In the CAA tournament, the Patriots lost to UNC Wilmington in the quarterfinals.

== Honors and awards ==
Colonial Athletic Association Rookie of the Year

- Curtis McCants

Colonial Athletic Association All-Rookie Team

- Curtis McCants
- Mike Sharp

== Player statistics ==
Player	GP	FG%	3FG%	FT%	RPG	APG	SPG	BPG	PPG
Donald Ross	27	.372	.356	.711	2.5	1.3	1.7	0.1	17.1
Curtis McCants	27	.472	.396	.757	2.0	4.6	1.3	0.1	14.6
Khyl Horton	20	.443	.345	.650	8.0	0.9	2.0	0.4	12.8
Troy Manns	27	.362	.238	.756	3.8	6.0	1.5	0.0	11.9
Kenwan Alford	27	.506	.500	.489	7.0	1.6	1.4	0.6	11.4
Mark McGlone	27	.579	.286	.513	6.6	0.3	0.6	0.1	8.6
Andrew Fingall	27	.364	.167	.654	6.7	0.2	0.4	0.6	6.7
Michael Sharp	27	.456	.000	.438	7.1	0.1	0.6	1.6	3.8
Riley Trone	25	.264	.208	.769	0.8	0.3	0.2	0.0	3.4
Robb Leff	21	.378	.353	.667	0.9	0.1	0.2	0.0	1.7
Mike Myers	8	.400	.500	.750	0.0	0.0	0.0	0.0	1.0

== Schedule and results ==
Date time, TV	Rank^{#}	Opponent^{#}	Result	Record	Site city, state
Non-conference regular season
November 27, 1993*		Troy State	W 129–119	1–0	Patriot Center; Fairfax, VA
December 2, 1993*		at Bucknell	W 101–99	2–0	Davis Gym; Lewisburg, PA
December 4, 1993*		at Northeastern	L 87–108	2–1	Matthews Arena; Boston, MA
December 6, 1993*		at Radford	L 81–99	2–2	Dedmon Center; Radford, VA
December 9, 1993*		Niagara	W 96–80	3–2	Patriot Center; Fairfax, VA
December 11, 1993*		Saint Peter's	L 81–82	3–3	Patriot Center; Fairfax, VA
December 22, 1993*		VCU; Rivalry	L 88–109	3–4	Patriot Center; Fairfax, VA
December 28, 1993*		vs. St. Francis (NY); Iona Classic	W 102–70	4–4	Hynes Athletic Center; New Rochelle, NY
December 29, 1993*		vs. Lafayette; Iona Classic	W 99–83	5–4	Hynes Athletic Center; New Rochelle, NY
January 2, 1994*		Niagara	L 82–85	5–5	Patriot Center; Fairfax, VA
January 4, 1994*		at No. 11 Louisville	L 87–132	5–6	Freedom Hall; Louisville, KY
CAA regular season
January 8, 1994		at UNC Wilmington	L 72–77	5–7 (0–1)	Trask Coliseum; Wilmington, NC
January 10, 1994		at East Carolina	L 72–86	5–8 (0–2)	Minges Coliseum; Greenville, NC
January 15, 1994		James Madison	L 94–95	5–9 (0–3)	Patriot Center; Fairfax, VA
January 19, 1994		Richmond	W 97–92	6–9 (1–3)	Patriot Center; Fairfax, VA
January 22, 1994		Old Dominion	L 91–120	6–10 (1–4)	Patriot Center; Fairfax, VA
January 26, 1994		at William & Mary	W 83–76	7–10 (2–4)	William & Mary Tribe; Williamsburg, VA
January 29, 1994		at American	W 115–102	8–10 (3–4)	Bender Arena; Washington, DC
February 1, 1994*		at Canisius	L 85–99	8–11	Koessler Athletic Center; Buffalo, NY
February 5, 1994		East Carolina	L 75–83	8–12 (3–5)	Patriot Center; Fairfax, VA
February 7, 1994		UNC Wilmington	L 74–80	8–13 (3–6)	Patriot Center; Fairfax, VA
February 12, 1994		at James Madison	L 81–110	8–14 (3–7)	JMU Convocation Center; Harrisonburg, VA
February 16, 1994		at Richmond	L 61–92	8–15 (3–8)	Robins Center; Richmond, VA
February 19, 1994		at Old Dominion	L 72–100	8–16 (3–9)	Norfolk Scope; Norfolk, VA
February 22, 1994		William & Mary	W 85–78	9–16 (4–9)	Patriot Center; Fairfax, VA
February 26, 1994		American	W 98–83	10–16 (5–9)	Patriot Center; Fairfax, VA
1994 CAA tournament
March 5, 1994	(6)	vs. (3) UNC Wilmington; Quarterfinals	L 97–100 ^{OT}	10–17	Richmond Coliseum; Richmond, VA
*Non-conference game. ^{#}Rankings from AP Poll. (#) Tournament seedings in parentheses. All times are in Eastern Time.
