= 2001 CAA men's basketball tournament =

American collegiate postseason men's basketball tournament

- Classification: Division I
- Season: 2000–01
- Teams: 8
- Site: Richmond Coliseum; Richmond, Virginia
- Champions: George Mason (3rd title)
- Winning coach: Jim Larranaga (2nd title)
- MVP: Erik Herring (George Mason)
- Television: ESPN

The 2001 CAA men's basketball tournament was held March 3–5, 2001, at the Richmond Coliseum in Richmond, Virginia. The winner of the tournament was George Mason, who received an automatic bid to the 2001 NCAA Men's Division I Basketball Tournament. Richmond, East Carolina, and American were not permitted by the Colonial Athletic Association to participate in the 2001 conference tournament as penalty for leaving the CAA to join the Atlantic 10 Conference, Conference USA, and the Patriot League, respectively, at the end of the 2000–2001 season.

== Bracket ==
Quarterfinals
4	William & Mary	47
5	Old Dominion	53*
3	VCU	57
6	James Madison	67

Semifinals
1	UNC-Wilmington	57
5	Old Dominion	54
2	George Mason	62
6	James Madison	36

Final
1	UNC-Wilmington	33
2	George Mason	35

== Honors ==
CAA All-Tournament Team	Player	School	Position
CAA All-Tournament Team	Erik Herring	George Mason	Forward
CAA All-Tournament Team	Craig Callahan	UNC-Wilmington	Forward
CAA All-Tournament Team	Brett Blizzard	UNC-Wilmington	Guard
CAA All-Tournament Team	George Evans	George Mason	Forward
CAA All-Tournament Team	Jon Larranaga	George Mason	Forward
CAA All-Tournament Team	Barron Thelman	UNC-Wilmington	Guard
