= 2018–19 George Mason Patriots men's basketball team =

American college basketball season

2018–19 George Mason Patriots men's basketball
- Conference: Atlantic 10 Conference
- Record: 18–15 (11–7 A-10)
- Head coach: Dave Paulsen (4th season)
- Assistant coaches: Dane Fischer; Aaron Kelly; Duane Simpkins
- Home arena: EagleBank Arena

2018–19 Atlantic 10 men's basketball standings
	Conf.				Overall
Team	W		L	PCT	W		L	PCT
VCU	16	–	2	.889	25	–	8	.758
Davidson	14	–	4	.778	24	–	10	.706
Dayton	13	–	5	.722	21	–	12	.636
St. Bonaventure	12	–	6	.667	18	–	16	.529
George Mason	11	–	7	.611	18	–	15	.545
Saint Louis †	10	–	8	.556	23	–	13	.639
Duquesne	10	–	8	.556	19	–	13	.594
Rhode Island	9	–	9	.500	18	–	15	.545
La Salle	8	–	10	.444	10	–	21	.323
Saint Joseph's	6	–	12	.333	14	–	19	.424
Richmond	6	–	12	.333	13	–	20	.394
George Washington	4	–	14	.222	9	–	24	.273
Massachusetts	4	–	14	.222	11	–	21	.344
Fordham	3	–	15	.167	12	–	20	.375
† 2019 Atlantic 10 tournament winner

The 2018–19 George Mason Patriots Men's basketball team represented George Mason University during the 2018–19 NCAA Division I men's basketball season. The season marked the 53rd for the program, the fourth under head coach Dave Paulsen, and the sixth as members of the Atlantic 10 Conference. The Patriots played their home games at EagleBank Arena in Fairfax, Virginia. They finished the season 18-15, 11-7 in A-10 Play to finish in 5th place. They defeated George Washington in the second round of the A-10 tournament before losing in the quarterfinals to St. Bonaventure.

== Previous season ==
They finished last season 16–17, 9–9 in A-10 play to finish in a four-way tie for fifth place. As the No. 5 seed in the A-10 tournament, they defeated Massachusetts in the second round before losing to Saint Joseph's in the quarterfinals.

== Offseason ==
=== 2018 recruiting class ===
College recruiting information
Name	Hometown	School	Height	Weight	Commit date
Jamal Hartwell II; G	Los Angeles, CA	Fairfax High School	5 ft 10 in (1.78 m)	150 lb (68 kg)	Apr 7, 2018
Jamal Hartwell II; G	Recruit ratings: No ratings found				
Jordan Miller; G	Purcellville, VA	Loudoun Valley High School	6 ft 6 in (1.98 m)	185 lb (84 kg)	May 22, 2017
Jordan Miller; G	Recruit ratings: No ratings found				
Jason Douglas-Stanley; G	Mount Vernon, NY	Mount Vernon High School	6 ft 2 in (1.88 m)	157 lb (71 kg)	Oct 16, 2017
Jason Douglas-Stanley; G	Recruit ratings: No ratings found				
Overall recruit ranking:
Note: In many cases, Scout, Rivals, 247Sports, On3, and ESPN may conflict in their listings of height and weight.; In these cases, the average was taken. ESPN grades are on a 100-point scale.; Sources: "ESPN". ESPN.; "2018 Team Ranking". Rivals.

== Preseason ==
From July 31 to August 8, the men's basketball team toured Spain, visiting Madrid, Valencia and Barcelona among other cities. As part of the trip, the team played three games against Spanish semi-professional teams. The Patriots won games against Club Baloncesto Alcobendas and the Mataro All-Stars and lost to Baloncesto CP La Roda.

== Honors and awards ==
Atlantic 10 Player of the Week

- Otis Livingston II - Dec. 3
- Justin Kier - Jan. 14
- Justin Kier - Jan. 21

Atlantic 10 All-Conference 2nd Team

- Justin Kier

Atlantic 10 Most Improved Player

- Justin Kier

== Roster ==
2018–19 George Mason Patriots men's basketball team
Players
Coaches

Pos.	#	Name	Height	Weight	Year	Previous school	Hometown
F	0	Goanar Mar (injured)	6 ft 7 in (2.01 m)	209 lb (95 kg)	So	DeLaSalle High School	Mankato, MN
G	1	Justin Kier	6 ft 4 in (1.93 m)	190 lb (86 kg)	Jr	Spotswood High School	Grottoes, VA
G	2	Zach Garrett (W)	6 ft 4 in (1.93 m)	202 lb (92 kg)	So	Heritage High School	Woodbridge, VA
G	4	Otis Livingston II	5 ft 11 in (1.8 m)	172 lb (78 kg)	Sr	Linden High School	Linden, NJ
G	5	Jaire Grayer (injured)	6 ft 5 in (1.96 m)	200 lb (91 kg)	Sr	IMG Academy	Flint, MI
G	10	Jamal Hartwell II	5 ft 10 in (1.78 m)	150 lb (68 kg)	Fr	Fairfax High School	Los Angeles, CA
G	11	Jordan Miller	6 ft 6 in (1.98 m)	185 lb (84 kg)	Fr	Loudoun Valley High School	Purcellville, VA
F	12	A. J. Wilson	6 ft 7 in (2.01 m)	201 lb (91 kg)	RS So	Elev8 Prep Academy	Lanham, MD
G	13	Logan Samuels	6 ft 1 in (1.85 m)	185 lb (84 kg)	RS Sr	Potomac High School / Hampden-Sydney College	Bowie, MD
G	20	Jason Douglas-Stanley	6 ft 2 in (1.88 m)	179 lb (81 kg)	Fr	Mount Vernon High School	Mount Vernon, NY
G	21	Jack Tempchin	5 ft 9 in (1.75 m)	155 lb (70 kg)	RS So	Blake High School	Silver Spring, MD
G	23	Javon Greene	6 ft 2 in (1.88 m)	190 lb (86 kg)	So	Henry County High School	McDonough, GA
G	24	Nick Diclementi (W)	6 ft 6 in (1.98 m)	208 lb (94 kg)	GS	Middleburg Academy	Leesburg, VA
F/C	31	Jarred Reuter	6 ft 7 in (2.01 m)	260 lb (118 kg)	RS Jr	Brewster Academy / UVA	Marion, MA
G	32	Ian Boyd	6 ft 4 in (1.93 m)	215 lb (98 kg)	Jr	Apex High School	Cary, NC
F	33	Greg Calixte	6 ft 8 in (2.03 m)	225 lb (102 kg)	So	Mount Vernon High School	Mount Vernon, NY

Head coach

- Dave Paulsen (Williams)

Assistant coach(es)

- Dane Fischer (Ithaca)
- Aaron Kelly (Catholic)
- Duane Simpkins (Maryland)

Legend

- (C) Team captain
- (S) Suspended
- (I) Ineligible
- (W) Walk-on
- Injured
- Current redshirt

Roster

== Player statistics ==
Player	GP	GS	MPG	FG%	3FG%	FT%	RPG	APG	SPG	BPG	PPG
Justin Kier	32	30	34.8	.474	.373	.762	6.5	2.6	1.6	0.3	14.3
Otis Livingston II	32	32	33.0	.394	.317	.873	2.2	4.1	1.0	0.0	13.1
Jordan Miller	16	15	29.4	.607	.313	.644	7.0	0.6	0.9	0.8	10.3
Jaire Grayer	7	7	22.3	.412	.405	.650	3.6	1.3	0.3	0.4	10.0
Javon Greene	32	27	28.5	.454	.315	.915	4.9	1.2	1.3	0.3	9.6
Jarred Reuter	32	30	18.6	.469	.000	.667	4.3	1.5	0.3	0.2	7.6
Ian Boyd	30	1	16.7	.445	.338	.636	2.1	2.3	0.7	0.6	5.4
Greg Calixte	29	2	14.0	.615	.000	.404	4.5	0.2	0.2	0.4	4.5
A.J. Wilson	29	0	11.2	.512	.000	.571	2.7	0.1	0.7	1.3	3.9
Goanar Mar	18	15	21.6	.286	.233	.600	2.5	0.7	0.4	0.3	3.1
Jamal Hartwell II	30	1	10.6	.369	.469	.625	0.5	0.7	0.1	0.0	3.0
Jason Douglas-Stanley	22	0	9.1	.237	.255	.750	0.5	0.2	0.1	0.0	2.0
Jack Tempchin	7	0	0.9	.500	.000	.000	0.1	0.0	0.0	0.0	0.3
Nick DiClementi	5	0	0.8	.000	.000	.000	0.0	0.0	0.0	0.0	0.0

== Schedule and results ==
Date time, TV	Rank^{#}	Opponent^{#}	Result	Record	High points	High rebounds	High assists	Site (attendance) city, state
Exhibition
November 1, 2018*; 7:00 pm, ESPN+		Johns Hopkins	W 60–50		18 – Kier	11 – Reuter	2 – Kier, Livingston II	EagleBank Arena (2,408); Fairfax, VA
Non-conference regular season
November 6, 2018*; 7:00 pm, ESPN+		Penn	L 71–72	0–1	15 – Reuter	8 – Kier	3 – Livingston II	EagleBank Arena (5,767); Fairfax, VA
November 9, 2018*; 7:00 pm, ESPN+		American	L 75–78 ^{OT}	0–2	18 – Greene	12 – Greene	10 – Livingston II	EagleBank Arena (5,774); Fairfax, VA
November 13, 2018*; 7:00 pm, ESPN+		at Georgia Southern	L 89–98	0–3	25 – Grayer	7 – Grayer, Greene	6 – Livingston II	Hanner Fieldhouse (2,638); Statesboro, GA
November 17, 2018*; 4:00 pm, ESPN+		Southern; Emerald Coast Classic Opener	W 69–65	1–3	17 – Livingston II	11 – Wilson	4 – Livingston II	EagleBank Arena (3,281); Fairfax, VA
November 20, 2018*; 7:00 pm, ESPN+		NC Central; Emerald Coast Classic Opener	W 78–63	2–3	24 – Reuter	5 – Boyd	7 – Livingston II	EagleBank Arena (2,603); Fairfax, VA
November 23, 2018*; 7:00 pm, CBSSN		vs. Cincinnati; Emerald Coast Classic semifinals	L 55–71	2–4	11 – Greene	4 – Wilson	5 – Livingston II	The Arena at NFSC (1,250); Niceville, FL
November 24, 2018*; 4:00 pm		vs. Baylor; Emerald Coast Classic 3rd place game	L 61–72	2–5	26 – Livingston II	6 – Kier	1 – Tied	The Arena at NFSC (1,250); Niceville, FL
November 28, 2018*; 7:00 pm, ESPN+		Morgan State	W 82–75	3–5	22 – Livingston II	8 – Greene	7 – Livingston II	EagleBank Arena (2,591); Fairfax, VA
December 1, 2018*; 4:00 pm		at William & Mary	W 87–84	4–5	18 – Livingston II	8 – Kier	10 – Livingston II	Kaplan Arena (3,332); Williamsburg, VA
December 3, 2018*; 7:00 pm, ESPN+		Vermont	L 67–72	4–6	32 – Kier	7 – Mar	2 – Mar	EagleBank Arena (2,704); Fairfax, VA
December 7, 2018*; 7:00 pm, MASN		James Madison; A10–CAA Challenge	W 66–53	5–6	21 – Livingston II	11 – Kier	4 – Kier	EagleBank Arena (5,065); Fairfax, VA
December 21, 2018*; 7:00 pm, ESPN+		Navy	W 84–63	6–6	30 – Livingston II	10 – Kier	5 – Kier	EagleBank Arena (3,419); Fairfax, VA
December 29, 2018*; 8:00 pm, FSKC/ESPN3		at Kansas State	L 58–59	6–7	15 – Kier	8 – Reuter	3 – Reuter	Bramlage Coliseum (9,973); Manhattan, KS
A-10 regular season
January 3, 2019; 7:30 pm, CBSSN		at Saint Joseph's	W 85–60	7–7 (1–0)	18 – Kier	14 – Kier	7 – Livingston II	Hagan Arena (2,989); Philadelphia, PA
January 6, 2019; 4:00 pm, NBCSN		St. Bonaventure	W 68–53	8–7 (2–0)	15 – Kier	14 – Kier	4 – Reuter	EagleBank Arena (4,028); Fairfax, VA
January 9, 2019; 7:00 pm, ESPN+		Davidson	L 56–61	8–8 (2–1)	26 – Kier	12 – Kier	4 – Kier	EagleBank Arena (3,012); Fairfax, VA
January 13, 2019; 5:30 pm, NBCSN		at Rhode Island	W 84–67	9–8 (3–1)	19 – Kier	10 – Kier	7 – Livingston II	Ryan Center (5,383); Kingston, RI
January 16, 2019; 7:00 pm, ESPN+		at Massachusetts	W 68–63	10–8 (4–1)	22 – Kier	9 – Kier	5 – Reuter	Mullins Center (2,412); Amherst, MA
January 19, 2019; 7:00 pm, ESPN+		Fordham	W 71–68	11–8 (5–1)	18 – Kier	9 – Kier, Reuter	6 – Livingston II	EagleBank Arena (3,892); Fairfax, VA
January 23, 2019; 7:00 pm, ESPN+		at Dayton	W 67–63	12–8 (6–1)	14 – Reuter	6 – Calixte	4 – Livingston II	UD Arena (12,895); Dayton, OH
January 26, 2019; 7:00 pm, ESPN+		George Washington; Revolutionary Rivalry	W 62–55	13–8 (7–1)	15 – Livingston II	11 – Kier	4 – Greene, Reuter	EagleBank Arena (6,683); Fairfax, VA
February 2, 2019; 6:30 pm, NBCSN		at VCU; Rivalry	L 63–79	13–9 (7–2)	15 – Reuter	13 – Miller	4 – Livingston II	Siegel Center (7,637); Richmond, VA
February 6, 2019; 7:00 pm, ESPN+		at Richmond	L 67–81	13–10 (7–3)	20 – Livingston II	8 – Miller	7 – Kier	Robins Center (4,769); Richmond, VA
February 10, 2019*; 2:00 pm, Stadium		La Salle	W 84–76	14–10 (8–3)	21 – Greene	8 – Kier	5 – Livingston II	EagleBank Arena (4,909); Fairfax, VA
February 13, 2019; 7:00 pm, ESPN+		Massachusetts	W 80–75 ^{OT}	15–10 (9–3)	21 – Livingston II	7 – Reuter	5 – Livingston II	EagleBank Arena (3,206); Fairfax, VA
February 17, 2019; 2:00 pm, Stadium		at St. Bonaventure	L 56–79	15–11 (9–4)	21 – Kier	7 – Reuter	3 – Livingston II	Reilly Center (4,803); Olean, NY
February 23, 2019; 4:00 pm, MASN		Duquesne	L 78–79	15–12 (9–5)	18 – Greene	11 – Miller	5 – Livingston II	EagleBank Arena (7,309); Fairfax, VA
February 27, 2019; 7:00 pm, ESPN+		Richmond	W 77–63	16–12 (10–5)	15 – Hartwell II	10 – Miller	6 – Livingston II	EagleBank Arena (3,281); Fairfax, VA
March 2, 2019; 3:00 pm, NBCSN		at Saint Louis	L 71–81	16–13 (10–6)	15 – Miller	9 – Miller	5 – Kier	Chaifetz Arena (6,814); St. Louis, MO
March 5, 2019; 7:30 pm, Stadium		VCU; Rivalry	L 36–71	16–14 (10–7)	11 – Miller	10 – Miller	2 – Greene	EagleBank Arena (6,177); Fairfax, VA
March 9, 2019; 2:00 pm, Stadium		at George Washington; Revolutionary Rivalry	W 81–65	17–14 (11–7)	17 – Miller	9 – Miller	9 – Kier	Charles E. Smith Center (3,024); Washington, D.C.
A-10 tournament
March 14, 2019; 2:30 pm, NBCSN	(5)	vs. (12) George Washington; Second Round	W 61–57	18–14	26 – Kier	10 – Miller	5 – Kier	Barclays Center (4,278); Brooklyn, NY
March 15, 2019; 2:30 pm, NBCSN	(5)	vs. (4) St. Bonaventure; Quarterfinals	L 57–68	18–15	20 – Kier	8 – Miller	3 – Reuter	Barclays Center (7,194); Brooklyn, NY
*Non-conference game. ^{#}Rankings from AP Poll. (#) Tournament seedings in parentheses. All times are in Eastern Time.

== See also ==
2018–19 George Mason Patriots women's basketball team
