= Kenny Sanders =

American basketball player

Personal information
- Listed height: 6 ft 5 in (1.96 m)

Career information
- High school: McKinley Tech (Washington, D.C.)
- College: George Mason (1985–1989)
- NBA draft: 1989: undrafted
- Position: Forward

Career highlights
- CAA Player of the Year (1989); 3× First-team All-CAA (1987–1989); CAA Rookie of the Year (1986); Fourth-team Parade All-American (1984)

Kenny Sanders is an American former college basketball player for George Mason University. Sanders came to George Mason from McKinley Technical High School in Washington, D.C. He was the Colonial Athletic Association's (CAA) Rookie of the Year in 1986 and its Player of the Year in 1988. As a senior, he led the Patriots to their first ever NCAA men's basketball tournament in 1989 after being selected to his third straight All-CAA First Team.

Sanders is currently George Mason University's second all-time leading scorer in men's basketball history. His 2,177 points trail only Carlos Yates (2,420). Kenny finished his collegiate career as one of fewer than 100 NCAA Division I men's basketball players with 2,000+ points and 1,000+ rebounds. In addition to his 2,177 points, he also grabbed 1,026 rebounds in 107 career games.

After graduation, Sanders was selected by the Cedar Rapids Silver Bullets in the 1989 CBA draft as the 11th pick in the third round (43rd overall).

== See also ==
- List of NCAA Division I men's basketball players with 2000 points and 1000 rebounds
