= Otis Livingston II =

American basketball player (born 1996)

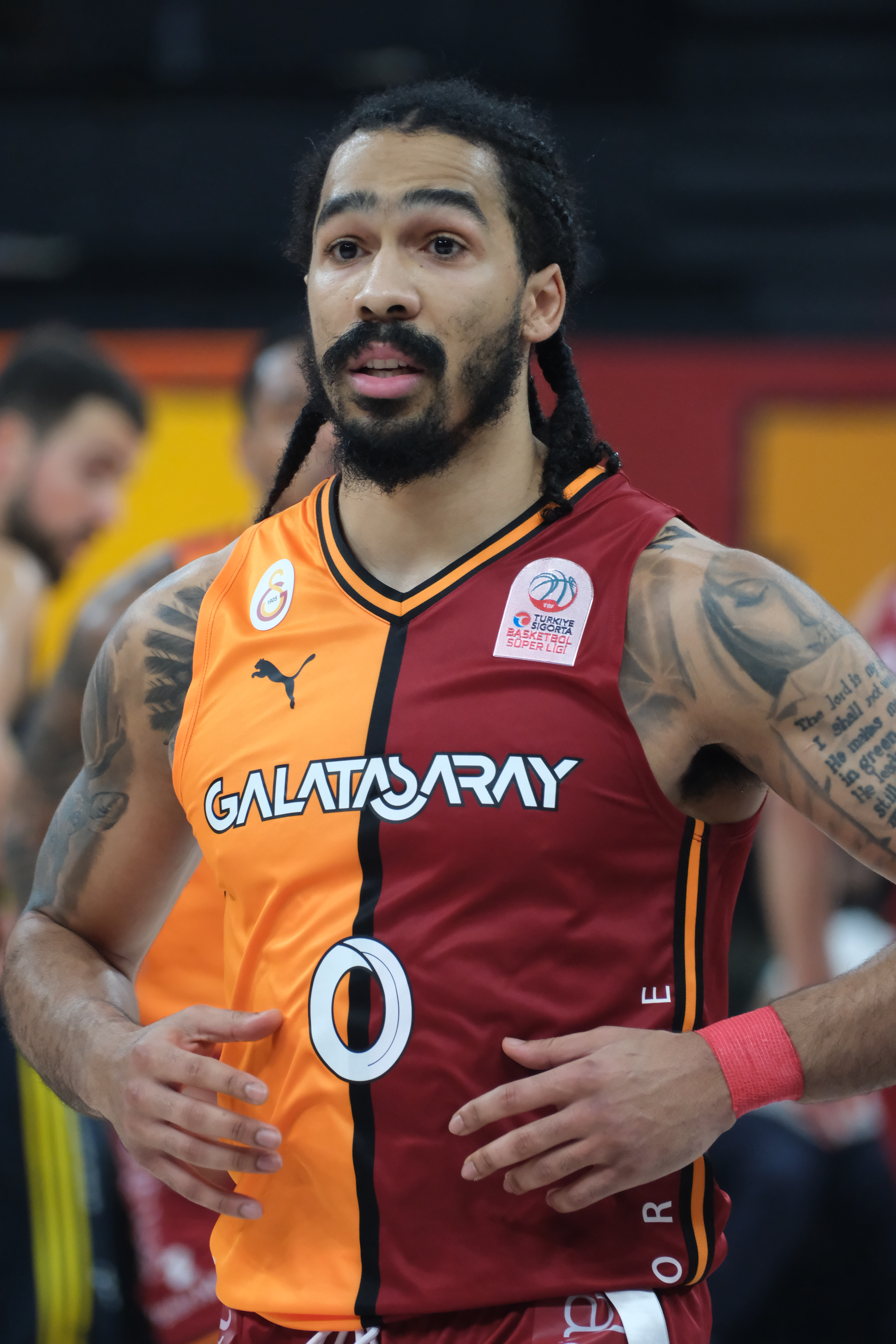
- Livingston with Galatasaray in 2025

No. 0 – U-BT Cluj-Napoca
- Position: Point guard
- League: Liga Națională; ABA League; EuroCup

Personal information
- Born: October 12, 1996 (age 30) Linden, New Jersey, U.S.
- Listed height: 1.80 m (5 ft 11 in)
- Listed weight: 80 kg (176 lb)

Career information
- High school: Linden High School (Linden, New Jersey)
- College: George Mason (2015–2019)
- NBA draft: 2019: undrafted
- Playing career: 2019–present

Career history
- 2019–2020: Horsens IC
- 2021: Kumanovo
- 2021–2022: Mladost Zemun
- 2022–2023: Crailsheim
- 2023: Bayreuth
- 2023–2024: Würzburg
- 2024–2025: Galatasaray
- 2025–2026: Girona
- 2026–present: U-BT Cluj-Napoca

Career highlights
- BBL MVP (2024); BBL Best Offensive Player (2024)

Otis Antoine Livingston II (born October 12, 1996) is an American professional basketball player who plays for U-BT Cluj-Napoca of the Romanian Liga Națională, the ABA League and the EuroCup. Standing at 5 ft 11 in (1.80 m), Livingston plays as a point guard. He played college basketball for the George Mason Patriots.

== Early life and youth career ==
Born in Linden, New Jersey, Livingston attended and played basketball for Linden High School in New Jersey. He went on to play college basketball for the George Mason Patriots in the Atlantic 10 Conference of the NCAA from 2015 to 2019. Over the course of four season with the Patriots, Livingston earned his place between the team's statistical leaders; fourth in scoring and second in assists. He was named to the All Conference Second Team in the 2017-18 season.

== Professional career ==
After finishing his college basketball career, Livingston signed with Horsens IC of the Danish Basketligaen in 2019. Livingston then signed with KK Kumanovo 2009 of the Macedonian Prva Liga in January 2021. He then joined KK Mladost Zemun of the Serbian KLS and ABA League 2 for the 2021-22 season.

In June 2022, Livingston signed with the Crailsheim Merlins of the Basketball Bundesliga (BBL). In February 2023, he moved to another Bundesliga team, Medi Bayreuth, until the end of the 2022-23 season.

In June 2023 he joined Würzburg Baskets of the Basketball Bundesliga on a one-year contract for the 2023-2024 season. Having a breakout season, Livingston won the BBL MVP Award and helped Würzburg reach the BBL Semifinals. Additionally, he won the Best Offensive Player award for the season.

In June 2024, Livingston signed with Galatasaray of the Turkish Basketbol Süper Ligi and the Basketball Champions League. With Galatasaray, he reached the final of the 2024–25 Basketball Champions League, losing to Unicaja.

On July 3, 2025, he signed with Bàsquet Girona of the Liga ACB, signing a one-year contract.

== Personal life ==
Livingston is the son of sports anchor and former college basketball player Otis Livingston.

== Career statistics ==
Legend
| GP | Games played | GS | Games started | MPG | Minutes per game |
| FG% | Field-goal percentage | 3P% | 3-point field-goal percentage | FT% | Free-throw percentage |
| RPG | Rebounds per game | APG | Assists per game | SPG | Steals per game |
| BPG | Blocks per game | PPG | Points per game | PIR | Performance index rating |
| **Bold** | Career high |

=== Domestic leagues ===
==== Regular season ====
| Year | Team | League | GP | MPG | FG% | 3P% | FT% | RPG | APG | SPG | BPG | PPG |
|---|---|---|---|---|---|---|---|---|---|---|---|---|
| 2023–24 | (Germany) Würzburg | BBL | 34 | 31.6 | .506 | .451 | .881 | 2.9 | 5.4 | 1.7 | .0 | 20.5 |
| 2024–25 | (Turkey) Galatasaray | BSL | 18 | 28.7 | .459 | .427 | .938 | 2.1 | 4.4 | .5 | .0 | 15.2 |

=== College ===
| Year | Team | GP | GS | MPG | FG% | 3P% | FT% | RPG | APG | SPG | BPG | PPG |
|---|---|---|---|---|---|---|---|---|---|---|---|---|
| 2015–16 | George Mason | 32 | 32 | 34.3 | .390 | .354 | .777 | 2.6 | 3.6 | .7 | .0 | 11.9 |
| 2016–17 | George Mason | **34** | **34** | 34.6 | .414 | .336 | **.919** | 3.1 | 3.0 | **1.1** | .0 | 14.3 |
| 2017–18 | George Mason | 33 | 32 | **36.3** | **.436** | **.382** | .857 | **3.2** | **4.4** | 1.0 | **.1** | **17.3** |
| 2018–19 | George Mason | 33 | 33 | 32.9 | .390 | .315 | .873 | 2.3 | 4.0 | 1.0 | .0 | 12.9 |
| Career | | 132 | 131 | 34.5 | .409 | .348 | .859 | 2.8 | 3.7 | 1.0 | .0 | 14.1 |
