= Marquise Moore =

American basketball player (born 1994)

Free agent
- Position: Point guard

Personal information
- Born: December 22, 1994 (age 31) Queens, New York, U.S.
- Listed height: 6 ft 2 in (1.88 m)
- Listed weight: 208 lb (94 kg)

Career information
- High school: St. Thomas More (Oakdale, Connecticut)
- College: George Mason (2013–2017)
- NBA draft: 2017: undrafted
- Playing career: 2017–present

Career history
- 2017–2019: Iowa Wolves
- 2021–2022: Phoenix Hagen
- 2022–2023: Imortal D.C.
- 2023–2024: OKK Spars
- 2024–2025: Belfius Mons-Hainaut

Career highlights
- Second-team All-Atlantic 10 (2017)

Marquise Moore (born December 22, 1994) is an American basketball player who last played for Belfius Mons-Hainaut of the BNXT League. He played college basketball for the George Mason Patriots.

== College career ==
Moore averaged 9.5 points per game as a sophomore. As a junior, Moore averaged 11.4 points and 6.1 rebounds per game.

Moore had the first triple-double in George Mason history in a 79–60 victory at Penn, scoring 17 points, grabbing 16 rebounds and dished out 10 assists. As a result, he was named Atlantic 10 player of the week on December 12, 2016. Along with Davidson's Peyton Aldridge, Moore was again named Atlantic 10 player of the week on December 26 after posting 20 points and career highs in rebounds (17) and blocks (4) in a win over Prairie View A&M. After scoring 25 points and pulling down 13 rebounds in an 82–77 win at Richmond, Moore collected his third Atlantic 10 player of the week honor on January 23, 2017, sharing the award with Javontae Hawkins of Fordham. Moore averaged 16.9 points and 10.9 rebounds per game as a senior, leading George Mason to a 20–14 record. He was named the Atlantic 10 Most Improved Player and was selected to the Second-team All-Atlantic 10.

== Professional career ==
Moore was selected eighth overall in the 2017 NBA G League draft by the Iowa Wolves. In his second season with the Wolves, Moore averaged 9.0 points, 5.0 rebounds and 2.6 assists per game, shooting 46.4 percent from the floor. He participated in the 2019 NBA Summer League on behalf of the Minnesota Timberwolves. Moore was waived by the Wolves on November 19, 2019.

On July 9, 2021, Moore signed with Phoenix Hagen of the German ProA.

On June 19, 2024, he signed with Belfius Mons-Hainaut of the BNXT League.

== Personal life ==
Moore's father, Vernon Moore, played college basketball at Creighton.
