= Ryan Pearson (basketball) =

American basketball player

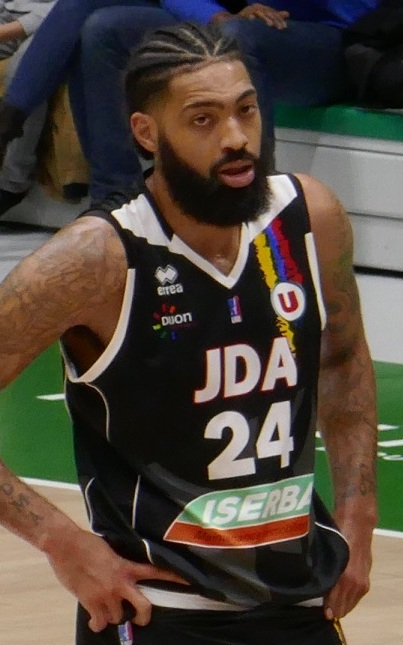
- Pearson in 2017

No. 26 – Mets de Guaynabo
- Position: Power forward / small forward
- League: Baloncesto Superior Nacional

Personal information
- Born: February 27, 1990 (age 36) Far Rockaway, New York, U.S.
- Listed height: 6 ft 6 in (1.98 m)
- Listed weight: 220 lb (100 kg)

Career information
- High school: Christ the King (Queens, New York)
- College: George Mason (2008–2012)
- NBA draft: 2012: undrafted
- Playing career: 2012–present

Career history
- 2012–2013: Goverla
- 2013: Maccabi Ashdod
- 2013–2015: Antwerp Giants
- 2015–2016: Alba Fehérvár
- 2016–2017: Le Mans Sarthe
- 2017–2018: JDA Dijon
- 2018–2019: Boulazac Basket Dordogne
- 2019–2020: Abejas de León
- 2020–2021: Urunday Universitario
- 2021–2022: Vaqueros de Bayamón
- 2022: Rain or Shine Elasto Painters
- 2023: Vaqueros de Bayamón
- 2023–2024: Soles de Mexicali
- 2025–2026: Pioneros de Los Mochis
- 2026–present: Mets de Guaynabo

Career highlights
- Honorable mention All-American – AP (2012); CAA Player of the Year (2012); First-team All-CAA (2012); Second-team All-CAA (2011); CAA All-Rookie Team (2009)

Ryan Pearson (born February 27, 1990) is an American professional basketball player for the Mets de Guaynabo of the Baloncesto Superior Nacional (BSN). He is known for his All-American college career at George Mason University.

== College career ==
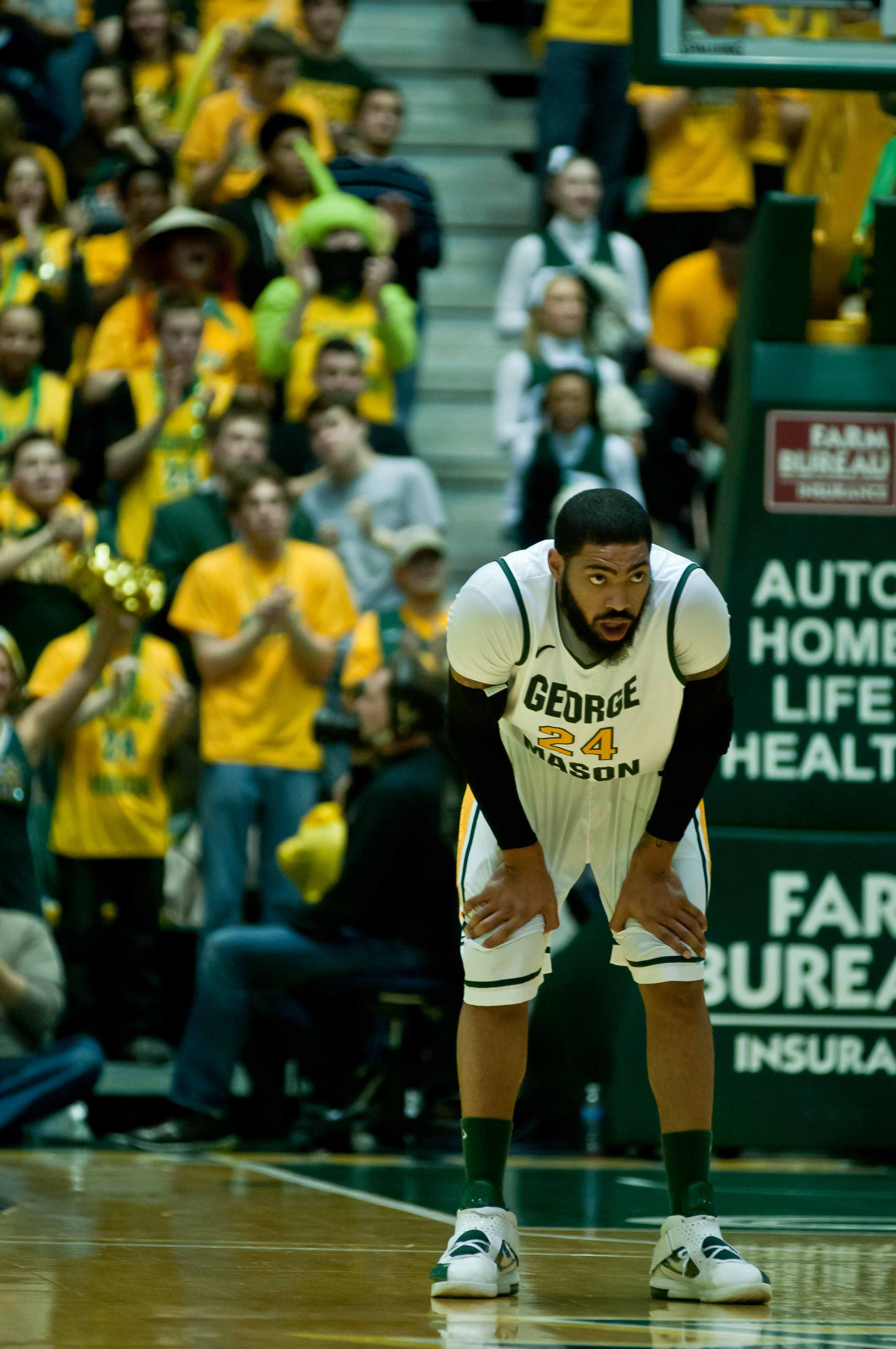
Pearson playing for George Mason in 2012

Pearson, a 6'6" small forward from Far Rockaway, Queens, New York, played high school basketball at Christ the King Regional High School in Queens. He committed to play college basketball at George Mason in Fairfax, Virginia for head coach Jim Larranaga. In his freshman season of 2008–09, Pearson 7.0 points and 3.6 rebounds per game, earning a spot on the Colonial Athletic Association (CAA) All-rookie team. As a sophomore, Pearson entered the Patriots' starting lineup, averaging 11.9 points and 6.4 rebounds per game.

As a junior, Pearson led the Patriots to a 26–7 record and a CAA regular-season championship. George Mason went to the 2011 NCAA Tournament, losing to #1 seed Ohio State in the third round. Pearson increased his averages to 14.2 points and 6.7 rebounds per game and gaining second-team all-CAA honors. In his senior year, Pearson led the Patriots to a 24–9 record in new coach Paul Hewitt's first season. Pearson again improved his production, averaging 17.0 points and 8.2 rebounds per game. Pearson was named CAA player of the year and an honorable mention All-American by the Associated Press. For his career, Pearson scored 1,626 points and collected 806 rebounds.

== Professional career ==
On August 9, 2012, Pearson signed his first professional contract with BC Hoverla of the Ukrainian Super League. Pearson started the 2013–14 season with Maccabi Ashdod of the Israeli Super League. After a few games with Ashdod he moved to the Antwerp Giants in Belgium.

On July 14, 2019, he signed with Boulazac Basket Dordogne of the LNB Pro A.

On November 6, 2022, Pearson signed with the Rain or Shine Elasto Painters of the Philippine Basketball Association (PBA) to replace Steve Taylor Jr. as the team's import for the 2022–23 PBA Commissioner's Cup.
