= Curtis McCants =

American basketball player (born 1975)

Personal information
- Born: August 2, 1975 (age 51) Florida, U.S.
- Listed height: 6 ft 0 in (1.83 m)
- Listed weight: 175 lb (79 kg)

Career information
- High school: Benjamin N. Cardozo (Queens, New York); St. Raphael Academy (Pawtucket, Rhode Island)
- College: George Mason (1993–1996); Cal State Bakersfield (1996–1997)
- NBA draft: 1997: undrafted
- Playing career: 1997–2007
- Position: Guard

Career history
- 1997–1998: Hapoel Tel Aviv
- 1998–1999: Mansfield Hawks
- 1999: Hapoel Tel Aviv
- 1999: Trotamundos de Carabobo
- 1999–2000: BC Kyiv
- 2000: Olympique Antibes
- 2000–2001: Montpellier Paillade
- 2001: Marinos de Oriente
- 2001–2002: CSKA Moscow
- 2002–2003: Montepaschi Siena
- 2003: Dakota Wizards
- 2003–2004: KK Split
- 2004: Limoges CSP
- 2004–2005: Hapoel Tel Aviv
- 2005: Ural Great Perm
- 2005–2006: JDA Dijon
- 2006: Benfica
- 2006–2007: Ironi Ramat Gan

Career highlights
- Adriatic League assists leader (2004); LNB Pro A Best Scorer (2001); LNB Pro A All-Star (2001); First-team All-CAA (1996); CAA Rookie of the Year (1994)

Curtis Reynard McCants (born August 2, 1975) is an American former professional basketball player. A 6-foot point guard, he played college basketball at George Mason for 3 years, being named CAA Rookie of the Year in 1994 and first team All-Conference in 1996 before leaving the program after a fight with a teammate. He finished his college career at Cal State Bakersfield in the NCAA Division II and started his professional career in 1997 playing in Israel. In 2001 he was the top scorer of the LNB Pro A in France. In 10 years of pro career he played in several countries in Europe and South America. McCants has a daughter, Asia McCants, who played Division 1 basketball at Howard University.

== High school career ==
McCants was born in the state of Florida but grew up in Queens, New York with his mother and grandmother, attending Benjamin N. Cardozo High School. He then moved to Rhode Island, where he attended St. Raphael Academy in Pawtucket. In his junior year he earned first team All-State honors, averaging 34.9 points per game and recorded a career-high 55 points in a single game. In his senior year he was again named first team All-State, with averages of 32 points, 8 rebounds and 9 assists per game, and was named Rhode Island Gatorade Player of the Year.

== College career ==
McCants signed to play for George Mason and during his first season he was named the CAA Rookie of the Year after averaging 14.6 points, 2 rebounds and 4.6 assists per game while shooting 39.6% from the 3-point line, one of the best marks in a single season in the history of George Mason. He ranked second on his team in scoring (behind junior Donald Ross) and assists. In his sophomore year of college McCants improved his assists numbers, and had several games with 10+ assists; on February 22, 1995, he recorded 15 assists versus Richmond, the single-game record for George Mason that still stands as of 2019. At the end of the 1994–95 season he ranked 2nd in assists in the whole NCAA Division I with an average of 9.3 per game, behind Nelson Haggerty of Baylor. He also had a new George Mason record for most assists in a single season with 251 and ranked second on the team in scoring behind Nate Langley.

McCants' junior year at GMU saw him become the primary scoring option of the team, and he averaged 22 points per game, leading his team in both scoring and assists. He recorded a career-high 38 points versus Cal Poly-SLO on January 13, 1996 and a season-high 14 assists against Hampton on December 28, 1995, For the second consecutive season McCants ranked 2nd overall in assists per game in the NCAA with 8.3 behind Raimonds Miglinieks of UC Irvine, and was named in the All-CAA First Team. He holds George Mason's records for total assists with 598, career average with 7.3, and most assists in a season with 251 in 1994–95, all still standing as of 2019.

On April 20, 1996, McCants was charged with disorderly conduct and arrested after getting into a fistfight with Camerron Taylor, a former GMU player. Following the incident, McCants was removed from the team. Facing the possibility of sitting out the whole season, he transferred to Cal State Bakersfield in the NCAA Division II, where he played his last season of college basketball. He played 24 games, averaging 14.2 points, 2.1 rebounds, 4.5 assists, and 0.7 steals per game in 28.5 minutes per contest, shooting a career-high 40.2% from three.

=== College statistics ===
Year	Team	GP	GS	MPG	FG%	3P%	FT%	RPG	APG	SPG	BPG	PPG
1993–94	George Mason	27		22.9	.472	.396	.757	2.0	4.6	1.3	0.1	14.6
1994–95	George Mason	27		29.1	.435	.360	.801	3.2	9.3	1.0	0.0	15.2
1995–96	George Mason	27		31.2	.442	.312	.833	4.0	8.3	1.3	0.0	22.0
Career		81		27.7	.448	.345	.803	3.1	7.4	1.2	0.0	17.3

== Professional career ==
After the end of his senior season, McCants was automatically eligible for the 1997 NBA draft, but he was not selected by an NBA franchise. He briefly signed for the Connecticut Skyhawks of the USBL, being released on May 10, 1997, and moved to Israel, joining Hapoel Tel Aviv, playing in the Israeli second level and averaging 20.6 points per game. In 1998 he came back to the United States to play for the Mansfield Hawks of the IBA before going back to Hapoel Tel Aviv in 1999, where he played 10 games averaging 19.9 points, 2.4 rebounds and 4.6 assists. He then joined Trotamundos de Carabobo in Venezuela, and then moved to Ukraine ending the 1999–2000 season with BC Kyiv.

In 2000 he signed for Olympique Antibes in France, and after 3 games where he averaged a league-leading 23.0 points, he moved to Montpellier Paillade, where he played the remainder of the season, averaging 21.6 points in 26 games for a total average of 21.7, the best in the league, and won the LNB Pro A Best Scorer title. After experiencing success in France he moved to Russia after a brief experience in Venezuela with Marinos de Oriente, and signed for CSKA Moscow. He competed in the 2001–02 Euroleague, averaging 13.8 points in 19 games. In the Russian league he played 34 games (25 starts) averaging 9.5 points and 4.1 assists per game.

In 2002 he moved to Italy, signing for Montepaschi Siena, and averaged 5 points in 19.8 minutes per game in 4 appearances. He also played 7 games in the 2002–03 Euroleague, averaging 4.1 points per game. In 2003 he played in the CBA with the Dakota Wizards, averaging 5.2 points, 2.2 rebounds and 3.2 assists in 5 games played. He then joined KK Split in Croatia. On December 16, 2003, he recorded 9 steals in an ABA League game against KK Zagreb, a new ABA League record. He also recorded 12 assists versus Cholet Basket in the 2003–04 ULEB Cup, and averaged 15.1 points and 6.8 assists in the competition. He then went back to France, this time signing with Limoges CSP where he averaged 13.8 points and 6.9 assists per game over 17 appearances.

In 2004 he joined Hapoel Tel Aviv for the third time in his career, and averaged 13.9 points and 7.7 assists in 15 games before moving to Ural Great Perm in Russia, where he finished the season with 15.5 points and 5.3 assists in 4 games played. In 2005–06 he played for Dijon in France (9 games with 11.9 points and 7.7 assists per game) and Benfica in Portugal (averaging 9.1 points and 5.8 assists in 9 games). He played his last season in 2006–07 in Israel with Ironi Ramat Gan, playing 8 games and averaging 11.9 points and 5.5 assists.
