= Carlos Yates =

American basketball player (1962–1989)

Personal information
- Born: February 22, 1962
- Died: August 13, 1989 (aged 27) Washington, D.C., U.S.
- Listed height: 6 ft 5 in (1.96 m)

Career information
- High school: Flint Hill (Oakton, Virginia)
- College: George Mason (1981–1985)
- NBA draft: 1985: undrafted
- Position: Forward

Career highlights
- CAA co-Player of the Year (1983); 3× First-team All-CAA (1982–1985)

Carlos Yates (February 22, 1962 – August 13, 1989) was an American basketball player notable for college career at George Mason University.

== College career ==
Yates began his collegiate career at George Mason and played for the Patriots all four years. He was the Eastern College Athletic Conference's (ECAC) Rookie of the Year in 1982 and its Co-Player of the Year in 1983 (along with James Madison's Dan Ruland). He was selected to four straight All-ECAC South Conference First Teams from 1981 to 1985. In addition, Yates earn honorable mention All-America honors those four straight years. On January 31, 1983, during Yates's sophomore season, he was selected by Sports Illustrated as their National Player of the Week.

Yates is George Mason University's all-time leading scorer in men's basketball history with 2,420 points as well as the state of Virginia's fourth all-time leading scorer. He also holds the school record for career field goals made and attempted and free throws made and attempted.

== Professional career ==
Yates was drafted fourth overall by the Florida Suncoast Stingers in the 1985 Continental Basketball Association draft.

== Death ==
Yates was shot and killed on August 13, 1989, near Robert F. Kennedy Stadium in southeast Washington, D.C.
