= George Evans (basketball) =

American basketball player

Personal information
- Born: January 31, 1971 (age 55) Portsmouth, Virginia, U.S.
- Listed height: 6 ft 7 in (2.01 m)
- Listed weight: 225 lb (102 kg)

Career information
- High school: I. C. Norcom (Portsmouth, Virginia)
- College: George Mason (1997–2001)
- NBA draft: 2001: undrafted
- Playing career: 2001–2011
- Position: Power forward / center

Career history
- 2001: Maryland Mustangs
- 2001–2008: Dexia Mons-Hainaut
- 2008–2011: TBB Trier

Career highlights
- Belgian League MVP (2006); 3× CAA Player of the Year (1999–2001); 2× CAA Defensive Player of the Year (1999, 2001); 3× CAA All-Defensive Team (1998, 2000, 2001); 3× First-team All-CAA (1999–2001); Second-team All-CAA (1998); CAA Rookie of the Year (1998)

George Evans (born January 31, 1971) is an American former professional basketball player. He played in college for George Mason University from 1997 to 2001 where he ranks first all-time at George Mason in steals (218), second in blocked shots (211), third in points (1,953) and rebounds (953), and 13th in assists (226).

== Basketball career ==
=== College ===
Evans shares a record with David Robinson as being the only two players in Colonial Athletic Association history to win three CAA Player of the Year awards. He is also just one of four players in NCAA history to record more than 200 steals, assists and blocked shots for a career, joining Danny Manning, Lionel Simmons and Shane Battier.

=== Professional ===
After he graduated from George Mason University in 2001, Evans was the first pick overall in the USBL draft on April 12, 2001, by the now defunct Maryland Mustangs. Soon after, he joined the professional basketball team Mons-Hainaut of the Basketball League Belgium. He was named the Belgian League's MVP in 2006. With the 2008/09 Season he joined TBB Trier in Germany's First Division. He left the team in April 2011 for family reasons.

== Personal life ==
Evans served in the Army Reserves and is a veteran of the Persian Gulf War.

== Statistics ==
=== Professional career ===
Mons-Hainaut – Belgian League 1

Year	G	PPG	RPG	AST	ST	TO	BLK	FG%	FT%	3P%
2001–02	30	17.0	8.6	2.0	0.0	0.0	0.0	60.2	52.6	0.0
2002–03	27	17.4	5.8	1.7	2.4	1.9	0.8	68.1	54.8	0.0
2003–04	36	17.2	6.3	1.8	0.0	0.0	0.0	64.3	53.6	33.3
2004–05	36	17.0	7.7	2.6	2.0	2.4	0.3	68.3	56.6	0.0
2005–06	38	18.3	7.0	2.5	3.1	2.9	0.4	69.7	61.2	0.0
2006–07	26	16.3	6.4	2.7	2.0	2.5	0.7	65.9	66.7	33.3
