= George Mason–VCU rivalry =

College sports rivalry

GMU–VCU rivalry
- George Mason Patriots VCU Rams
- Trophy: None

Statistics
- Total meetings: 258 known
- All-time series: VCU leads 141–112–15

Locations of George Mason and VCU

The George Mason–VCU rivalry or the Mason–VCU rivalry refers to the rivalry between the George Mason University Patriots (George Mason) and the Virginia Commonwealth University Rams (VCU). The rivalry, historically, was one of the most intense college sports rivalry in Virginia, especially in college basketball. The rivalry is further intensified by both the schools proximity, and for the majority of the last 30 years, the two schools playing in the same conference: the Coastal Athletic Association from 1995 to 2012 and the Atlantic 10 Conference from 2013 to present. The rivalry dates back to the late 1970s into the early 1980s, when the two school's programs began regularly playing against one another in collegiate sports.

Historically, across most sports, the rivalry has been in favor of VCU over George Mason, particularly in men's basketball, men's soccer, and tennis. George Mason has typically had the advantage in women's soccer, and the rivalry has been relatively even in baseball, women's basketball, and women's volleyball.

== History ==
=== School foundations ===
College Comparison
	George Mason	VCU
Founded	1957	1838
Type	Public	Public
Location	Fairfax	Richmond
Conference	A-10	A-10
Students	40,185	28,919
School colors		
Nickname	Patriots	Rams
Stadium	George Mason Stadium	Sports Backers Stadium
Arena	EagleBank Arena	Siegel Center
Ballpark	Spuhler Field	The Diamond

George Mason University's history dates back to 1949, when the University of Virginia opened a branch in Northern Virginia. The extension center offered both for credit and non-credit informal classes in the evenings in the Vocational Building of the Washington-Lee High School in Arlington, Virginia.

A resolution of the Virginia General Assembly in January 1956 changed the extension center into University College, the Northern Virginia branch of the University of Virginia. John Norville Gibson Finley served as director. Seventeen freshmen students attended classes at University College in a small renovated elementary school building in Bailey's Crossroads starting in September 1957. In 1958 University College became George Mason College.

The city of Fairfax purchased and donated 150 acres (0.61 km^{2}) of land to the University of Virginia for the college's new site, which is now referred to as the Fairfax Campus. In 1959, the Board of Visitors of the University of Virginia selected a permanent name for the college: George Mason College of the University of Virginia. The Fairfax campus construction planning that began in early 1960 showed visible results when the development of the first 40 acres (160,000 m^{2}) of Fairfax Campus began in 1962. In the Fall of 1964 the new campus welcomed 356 students.

During the 1966 Session of the Virginia General Assembly, Alexandria delegate James M. Thomson, with the backing of the University of Virginia, introduced a bill in the General Assembly to make George Mason College a four-year institution under the University of Virginia's direction. The measure, known as H 33, passed the Assembly easily and was approved on March 1, 1966, making George Mason College a degree-granting institution. During that same year, the local jurisdictions of Fairfax County, Arlington County, and the cities of Alexandria and Falls Church agreed to appropriate $3 million to purchase land adjacent to Mason to provide for a 600-acre (2.4 km^{2}) Fairfax Campus with the intention that the institution would expand into a regional university of major proportions, including the granting of graduate degrees.

The origins of Virginia Commonwealth University begin in 1838, which was when the Medical department of Hampden-Sydney College was founded. By 1844, the Egyptian Building was erected, serving as the main building for the Hampden-Sydney Medical Department. The name "Egyptian Building" was coined due to its Egyptian revival style of architecture. Today, the Egyptian Building is the oldest building at VCU. While initially serving as a part of Hampden-Sydney, the department received an independent charter from the Virginia General Assembly in 1854 to become its own independent institution of higher learning. Subsequently, the department was rebranded as the Medical College of Virginia. The newly named Medical College (MCV) became a state-funded college in 1860, in return for a $30,000 appropriation. As a public school, the school has its first hospital constructed on campus the following year.

Throughout the American Civil War, the MCV became notable in being one of the few universities in the Confederacy to remain open and have a graduating class each year of the Civil War. The MCV is the only existing school in the Southern United States to have this special distinction. Closing out the 1860s, the school opened its first outpatient clinic. By 1879, the General Assembly granted the MCV the right to grant students degrees in Pharmacy. In the 1890s, several major additions to the MCV were added, such as the Pharmacy University College in 1893, the School of Dentistry in 1895, and the School of Pharmacy in 1898. From 1910 through 1965, the School became the independent Richmond Professional Institute, which merged with the Medical College of Virginia in 1968 to become Virginia Commonwealth University.

During the 1966–67 school year, the Patriots fielded their first athletic teams, while the Rams fielded their first athletic teams under their moniker two years later: in 1968–69. However, it was not until the 1981–82 season that both basketball programs would compete against each other.

=== CAA days ===
The rivalry between George Mason University and Virginia Commonwealth University (VCU) has been punctuated by several major moments, particularly during their time in the Colonial Athletic Association (CAA). One of the most significant was in 2006 where George Mason defeated VCU on their path to a historic Final Four run, with a rare victory at the Siegel Center, solidifying the rivalry's importance. This moment was mirrored in 2011, when VCU, also en route to a Final Four appearance, triumphed over 25th-ranked George Mason in the CAA tournament semifinal, adding another layer of intensity to the rivalry. Beyond these tournament clashes, regular season matchups were consistently high-stakes, marked by physical play and passionate crowds, creating an electric atmosphere in both the Patriot Center and the Siegel Center. Even after both programs moved to the Atlantic 10 conference, the rivalry persisted through non-conference games, maintaining the passion that defined their CAA encounters. The geographic proximity of the two universities, along Interstate 95, has further fueled the rivalry, creating a "Battle of I-95" narrative that enhances the significance of each matchup.

During their time in the CAA, the Patriots and Rams met three times in the Coastal Athletic Association men's basketball tournament final: 2004, 2007, and 2009, with VCU winning all three occasions.

=== Atlantic 10 days ===
Virginia Commonwealth University (VCU) and George Mason University continued their basketball rivalry into the 2010s and beyond, despite both schools transitioning to the Atlantic 10 Conference (A-10). VCU joined the A-10 in 2012, followed by George Mason in 2013, ensuring that the rivalry remained intact within their new conference.

During the early years of their A-10 membership, George Mason’s basketball program underwent a rebuilding phase, struggling to consistently compete at the top of the conference. However, by the 2020s, the Patriots regained competitiveness, once again emerging as a formidable opponent within the league.

The rivalry reached a new milestone in the 2025 Atlantic 10 Tournament, where VCU and George Mason met in the championship game for the first time in 16 years. The highly anticipated matchup marked the first time the two programs had faced off for a conference title since their days in the Colonial Athletic Association, signaling a full resurgence for George Mason and a continuation of their long-standing rivalry with VCU. That same season, both Mason and VCU shared the A-10 regular season title.

== All-time results ==
Sport	All-time series record	Last result	Next meeting
Baseball	VCU leads 65–54	Mason won 6–5 on April 13, 2025	2026 @ Mason
Men's basketball	VCU leads 50–21	VCU won 70–65 on March 3, 2026	March 3, 2026 @ VCU
Women's basketball	VCU leads 38–35	Mason won 68–58 on January 4, 2026	TBD
Women's lacrosse	VCU leads 7–3	VCU won 12–7 on March 12, 2025	April 25, 2026 @ VCU
Men's soccer	VCU leads 20–10–12	VCU won 2–1 on October 8, 2025	2026 @ VCU
Women's soccer	Mason leads 15–11–10	VCU won 3–1 on October 11, 2025	2026 @ VCU
Men's Tennis	VCU leads 28–1	VCU won 6–1 on February 28, 2025	TBD
Women's Tennis	VCU leads 24–3	VCU won 4–1 on April 18, 2025	February 22, 2026 @ VCU
Women's volleyball	Mason leads 39–34	VCU won 3–1 on November 21, 2025	2026 @ TBD

Series led and games won by VCU	Series led and games won by George Mason

=== Baseball ===
George Mason victories	VCU victories

No.	Date	Location	Winner	Score
1	April 15, 1975	Fairfax, VA	George Mason	6–2
2	April 16, 1975	Fairfax, VA	George Mason	4–1
3	March 17, 1976	Richmond, VA	George Mason	15–4
4	March 18, 1976	Richmond, VA	George Mason	8–1
5	April 5, 1977	Fairfax, VA	George Mason	11–0
6	April 6, 1977	Fairfax, VA	George Mason	9–3
7	March 14, 1978	Richmond, VA	George Mason	4–2
8	March 15, 1978	Richmond, VA	George Mason	7–3
9	April 8, 1980^{DH}	Fairfax, VA	VCU	5–2
10	April 8, 1980^{DH}	Fairfax, VA	George Mason	14–9
11	March 26, 1981	Fairfax, VA	George Mason	8–7
12	March 28, 1982	Richmond, VA	VCU	17–7
13	April 30, 1982	Fairfax, VA	George Mason	8–3
14	April 7, 1984	Fairfax, VA	VCU	4–1
15	March 10, 1985^{DH}	Richmond, VA	George Mason	3–0
16	March 10, 1985^{DH}	Richmond, VA	VCU	14–11
17	March 8, 1986	Richmond, VA	George Mason	2–1
18	April 8, 1986	Fairfax, VA	George Mason	10–7
19	March 3, 1987	Charlottesville, VA	George Mason	11–7
20	April 6, 1987	Richmond, VA	VCU	7–4
21	February 28, 1988	Richmond, VA	George Mason	10–2
22	April 14, 1988	Fairfax, VA	VCU	9–2
23	April 24, 1989	Fairfax, VA	George Mason	2–0
24	March 4, 1990	Richmond, VA	VCU	2–1
25	March 11, 1990	Fairfax, VA	George Mason	5–4
26	April 10, 1991	Fairfax, VA	George Mason	5–3
27	April 25, 1991	Richmond, VA	George Mason	6–2
28	February 29, 1992	Richmond, VA	VCU	4–1
29	April 11, 1992	Fairfax, VA	George Mason	4–3
30	April 27, 1993^{DH}	Richmond, VA	VCU	7–2
31	April 27, 1993^{DH}	Richmond, VA	George Mason	3–2
32	May 2, 1993	Fairfax, VA	George Mason	4–1
33	April 27, 1994	Fairfax, VA	VCU	8–4
34	March 29, 1995	Fairfax, VA	George Mason	6–4
35	April 4, 1995^{DH}	Richmond, VA	VCU	2–1
36	April 4, 1995^{DH}	Richmond, VA	VCU	4–3
37	April 5, 1995	Richmond, VA	VCU	19–9
38	March 15, 1997^{DH}	Richmond, VA	VCU	6–2
39	March 15, 1997^{DH}	Richmond, VA	George Mason	3–0
40	March 16, 1997	Richmond, VA	VCU	10–2
41	May 14, 1997	Kinston, NC	VCU	15–8

No.	Date	Location	Winner	Score
42	May 2, 1998^{DH}	Fairfax, VA	VCU	11–0
43	May 2, 1998^{DH}	Fairfax, VA	George Mason	5–2
44	May 3, 1998	Fairfax, VA	VCU	7–3
45	April 1, 1999	Richmond, VA	VCU	8–7
46	April 2, 1999	Richmond, VA	VCU	12–6
47	April 3, 1999	Richmond, VA	VCU	5–2^{10}
48	May 21, 1999	Kinston, NC	George Mason	8–0
49	March 31, 2000	Fairfax, VA	George Mason	8–7
50	April 1, 2000	Fairfax, VA	George Mason	4–3
51	April 2, 2000	Fairfax, VA	VCU	2–1
52	March 30, 2001	Richmond, VA	VCU	7–1
53	March 31, 2001	Richmond, VA	VCU	9–0
54	May 3, 2002	Fairfax, VA	VCU	8–4
55	May 4, 2002	Fairfax, VA	George Mason	6–4
56	May 5, 2002	Fairfax, VA	George Mason	4–0
57	May 24, 2002	Manteo, NC	VCU	13–10
58	May 4, 2003	Richmond, VA	No. 25 VCU	9–1
59	May 5, 2003	Richmond, VA	No. 25 VCU	3–0
60	May 6, 2003	Richmond, VA	No. 25 VCU	3–1
61	May 21, 2003	Manteo, NC	No. 24 VCU	6–4
62	April 23, 2004	Fairfax, VA	VCU	7–1
63	April 24, 2004	Fairfax, VA	George Mason	10–0
64	April 25, 2004	Fairfax, VA	George Mason	5–1
65	May 28, 2004	Wilmington, NC	George Mason	11–3
66	April 22, 2005	Richmond, VA	VCU	9–8
67	April 23, 2005	Richmond, VA	George Mason	21–6
68	April 24, 2005	Richmond, VA	VCU	18–8
69	May 26, 2005	Fairfax, VA	VCU	8–3
70	May 27, 2005	Fairfax, VA	VCU	5–3
71	April 21, 2006^{DH}	Fairfax, VA	George Mason	4–3
72	April 23, 2006^{DH}	Fairfax, VA	VCU	4–3
73	April 23, 2006^{DH}	Fairfax, VA	VCU	9–4
74	March 30, 2007	Richmond, VA	VCU	4–3
75	March 31, 2007	Richmond, VA	VCU	10–9
76	April 1, 2007	Richmond, VA	George Mason	8–5
77	April 9, 2008^{DH}	Richmond, VA	George Mason	5–4
78	April 9, 2008^{DH}	Richmond, VA	George Mason	6–2
79	April 17, 2009	Richmond, VA	VCU	4–3
80	April 18, 2009	Richmond, VA	No. 25 George Mason	8–2
81	April 19, 2009	Richmond, VA	No. 25 George Mason	9–2
82	May 14, 2010	Fairfax, VA	VCU	8–0

No.	Date	Location	Winner	Score
83	May 15, 2010	Fairfax, VA	VCU	12–9
84	May 16, 2010	Fairfax, VA	VCU	10–6
85	April 9, 2011^{DH}	Fairfax, VA	VCU	3–2
86	April 9, 2011^{DH}	Fairfax, VA	George Mason	5–4
87	April 10, 2011	Fairfax, VA	VCU	15–10
88	April 6, 2012	Richmond, VA	George Mason	7–4
89	April 7, 2012	Richmond, VA	George Mason	2–0
90	April 8, 2012	Richmond, VA	George Mason	4–2
91	May 23, 2012	Harrisonburg, VA	VCU	11–7
92	March 5, 2013	Richmond, VA	VCU	4–2
93	March 28, 2014	Fairfax, VA	George Mason	6–1
94	May 23, 2014	St. Louis, MO	George Mason	3–0
95	May 24, 2014	St. Louis, MO	George Mason	3–2
96	April 10, 2015	Richmond, VA	George Mason	8–1
97	April 11, 2015	Richmond, VA	VCU	9–1
98	April 12, 2015	Richmond, VA	George Mason	7–6
99	April 20, 2018	Richmond, VA	George Mason	11–3
100	April 21, 2018	Richmond, VA	VCU	6–4
101	April 22, 2018	Richmond, VA	VCU	1–0^{12}
102	April 16, 2019	Fairfax, VA	VCU	9–4
103	April 17, 2019	Fairfax, VA	VCU	3–2
104	April 18, 2019	Fairfax, VA	VCU	15–2
105	April 30, 2021	Richmond, VA	No. 23 VCU	9–2
106	May 1, 2021^{DH}	Richmond, VA	No. 23 VCU	3–1
107	May 1, 2021^{DH}	Richmond, VA	No. 23 VCU	8–1
108	May 2, 2021	Richmond, VA	VCU	11–2
109	April 1, 2022	Fairfax, VA	George Mason	7–6
110	April 2, 2022	Fairfax, VA	VCU	9–2
111	April 3, 2022	Fairfax, VA	VCU	15–5
112	April 14, 2023	Richmond, VA	VCU	5–0
113	April 15, 2023	Richmond, VA	George Mason	10–5
114	April 16, 2023	Richmond, VA	VCU	11–3
115	April 26, 2024	Fairfax, VA	VCU	6–4
116	April 27, 2024	Fairfax, VA	George Mason	3–2
117	April 28, 2024	Fairfax, VA	VCU	9–8
118	April 12, 2025	Richmond, VA	George Mason	4–2
119	April 13, 2025	Richmond, VA	VCU	10–6
120	April 14, 2025	Richmond, VA	George Mason	6–5
Series: VCU leads 64–56

=== Men’s basketball ===
George Mason victories	VCU victories

No.	Date	Location	Winner	Score
1	November 27, 1981	Charlottesville, VA	George Mason	81–68
2	November 26, 1982	Charlottesville, VA	VCU	78–67
3	December 8, 1984	Richmond, VA	VCU	87–78
4	December 30, 1985	Fairfax, VA	VCU	77–68
5	December 13, 1986	Richmond, VA	VCU	73–68
6	February 1, 1988	Fairfax, VA	George Mason	67–60
7	December 17, 1988	Richmond, VA	VCU	90–78
8	February 1, 1990	Fairfax, VA	George Mason	71–68
9	January 2, 1991	Richmond, VA	VCU	80–74
10	December 11, 1991	Fairfax, VA	VCU	90–82
11	January 2, 1993	Richmond, VA	VCU	103–75
12	December 22, 1993	Fairfax, VA	VCU	109–88
13	January 3, 1995	Richmond, VA	VCU	108–85
14	January 10, 1996	Richmond, VA	VCU	86–74
15	January 31, 1996	Fairfax, VA	VCU	94–81
16	January 2, 1997	Fairfax, VA	VCU	75–70
17	January 29, 1997	Richmond, VA	VCU	90–77
18	January 10, 1998	Richmond, VA	George Mason	62–54
19	February 10, 1998	Fairfax, VA	George Mason	62–60
20	January 20, 1999	Fairfax, VA	George Mason	77–68
21	February 17, 1999	Richmond, VA	George Mason	89–73
22	January 22, 2000	Richmond, VA	George Mason	76–63
23	January 10, 2001	Richmond, VA	VCU	72–65
24	February 14, 2001	Fairfax, VA	George Mason	99–79

No.	Date	Location	Winner	Score
25	January 23, 2002	Richmond, VA	VCU	75–59
26	February 20, 2002	Fairfax, VA	George Mason	83–80
27	January 15, 2003	Fairfax, VA	VCU	68–56
28	February 8, 2003	Richmond, VA	VCU	78–62
29	January 17, 2004	Richmond, VA	VCU	80–56
30	February 11, 2004	Fairfax, VA	George Mason	69–57
31	March 8, 2004	Richmond, VA	VCU	55–54
32	January 5, 2005	Fairfax, VA	VCU	81–74
33	February 14, 2005	Richmond, VA	VCU	89–81
34	January 5, 2006	Fairfax, VA	George Mason	73–60
35	February 9, 2006	Richmond, VA	George Mason	73–61
36	January 24, 2007	Fairfax, VA	VCU	75–62
37	February 8, 2007	Richmond, VA	VCU	63–49
38	March 5, 2007	Richmond, VA	VCU	65–59
39	January 28, 2008	Fairfax, VA	George Mason	63–51
40	January 24, 2009	Richmond, VA	VCU	76–71
41	March 9, 2009	Richmond, VA	VCU	71–50
42	February 9, 2010	Fairfax, VA	VCU	82–77
43	March 6, 2010	Richmond, VA	VCU	75–60
44	February 15, 2011	Richmond, VA	George Mason	71–51
45	March 6, 2011	Richmond, VA	VCU	79–63
46	February 14, 2012	Fairfax, VA	George Mason	62–61
47	February 25, 2012	Richmond, VA	VCU	89–77
48	January 9, 2014	Richmond, VA	VCU	71–57

No.	Date	Location	Winner	Score
49	February 14, 2015	Fairfax, VA	VCU	72–60
50	March 7, 2015	Richmond, VA	VCU	71–60
51	January 3, 2016	Richmond, VA	VCU	71–47
52	February 24, 2016	Fairfax, VA	George Mason	76–69
53	December 30, 2016	Fairfax, VA	VCU	73–64
54	March 4, 2017	Richmond, VA	VCU	72–60
55	March 10, 2017	Pittsburgh, PA	VCU	71–60
56	January 27, 2018	Fairfax, VA	VCU	84–76
57	February 28, 2018	Richmond, VA	George Mason	81–80
58	February 2, 2019	Richmond, VA	VCU	79–63
59	March 5, 2019	Fairfax, VA	VCU	71–36
60	January 5, 2020	Fairfax, VA	VCU	72–59
61	February 12, 2020	Richmond, VA	George Mason	72–67
62	January 6, 2021	Fairfax, VA	VCU	66–61
63	February 20, 2021	Richmond, VA	George Mason	79–76
64	February 12, 2022	Fairfax, VA	VCU	85–70
65	February 23, 2022	Richmond, VA	VCU	72–66
66	January 25, 2023	Richmond, VA	VCU	72–52
67	January 9, 2024	Fairfax, VA	VCU	54–50
68	February 22, 2025	Richmond, VA	VCU	70–54
69	March 16, 2025	Washington, DC	VCU	68–63
70	January 10, 2026	Fairfax, VA	George Mason	86–80
Series: VCU leads 49–21

=== Men’s soccer ===
George Mason victories	VCU victories	Tie games

No.	Date	Location	Winner	Score
1	September 29, 1979	Fairfax, VA	George Mason	6–0
2	September 20, 1980	Richmond, VA	Tie	1–1
3	October 31, 1981	Fairfax, VA	George Mason	2–0
4	November 5, 1984	Richmond, VA	George Mason	5–0
5	September 2, 1987	Fairfax, VA	Tie	1–1
6	September 2, 1995	Fairfax, VA	George Mason	1–0
7	October 26, 1996	Richmond, VA	Tie	1–1
8	November 1, 1997	Fairfax, VA	George Mason	5–0
9	November 14, 1997	Richmond, VA	VCU	2–0
10	October 24, 1998	Richmond, VA	VCU	1–0
11	September 29, 1999	Richmond, VA	VCU	6–0
12	October 28, 2000	Fairfax, VA	Tie	1–1
13	November 9, 2000	Richmond, VA	VCU	1–0
14	November 7, 2001	Richmond, VA	George Mason	2–1
15	November 15, 2001	Richmond, VA	Tie	0–0 (OT)

No.	Date	Location	Winner	Score
16	October 25, 2002	Fairfax, VA	Tie	0–0
17	October 19, 2003	Richmond, VA	VCU	2–0
18	November 16, 2003	Richmond, VA	VCU	2–0
19	October 19, 2003	Richmond, VA	VCU	2–0
20	October 10, 2004	Fairfax, VA	VCU	1–0
21	September 30, 2005	Fairfax, VA	Tie	0–0 (2OT)
22	October 20, 2006	Richmond, VA	George Mason	1–0
23	October 26, 2007	Fairfax, VA	VCU	3–1
24	September 27, 2008	Fairfax, VA	George Mason	2–1
25	September 26, 2009	Richmond, VA	George Mason	1–0
26	October 2, 2010	Fairfax, VA	VCU	1–0
27	October 1, 2011	Richmond, VA	VCU	1–0
28	October 20, 2013	Fairfax, VA	Tie	0–0 (2OT)
29	November 5, 2013	Dayton, OH	George Mason	3–2 (OT)
30	October 4, 2014	Richmond, VA	VCU	3–0

No.	Date	Location	Winner	Score
31	October 3, 2015	Fairfax, VA	VCU	1–1 (2OT)
32	October 1, 2016	Richmond, VA	VCU	2–0
33	October 18, 2017	Fairfax, VA	VCU	4–0
34	October 20, 2018	Richmond, VA	VCU	2–0
35	November 2, 2019	Fairfax, VA	VCU	1–0
36	November 9, 2019	Richmond, VA	VCU	3–2 (PK)
37	March 20, 2021	Richmond, VA	Tie	0–0 (2OT)
38	April 10, 2021	Fairfax, VA	VCU	2–0
39	October 16, 2021	Fairfax, VA	VCU	1–0 (OT)
40	October 22, 2022	Richmond, VA	VCU	3–1
41	October 21, 2023	Fairfax, VA	VCU	2–1
42	November 2, 2024	Richmond, VA	Tie	0–0
43	October 8, 2025	Fairfax, VA	VCU	2–1
Series: VCU leads 23–10–10
