= George Mason Patriots men's basketball =

NCAA Division I program

2026–27 George Mason Patriots men's basketball team
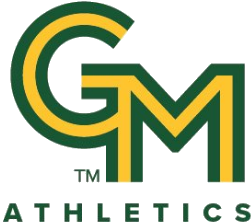
- University: George Mason University
- Head coach: Tony Skinn (4th season)
- Location: Fairfax, Virginia
- Arena: EagleBank Arena (capacity: 10,000)
- Conference: Atlantic 10
- Nickname: Patriots
- Colors: Green and gold
- Student section: Patriot Platoon

NCAA Division I tournament Final Four
- 2006
Other NCAA Division I tournament results
Elite Eight	2006
Sweet Sixteen	2006
Appearances	1989, 1999, 2001, 2006, 2008, 2011

Conference tournament champions
- 1989, 1999, 2001, 2008

Conference regular-season champions
- 1999, 2000, 2006, 2011, 2025

Uniforms
Home	Away

The George Mason Patriots men's basketball team represents George Mason University. The Patriots play at the EagleBank Arena in Fairfax, Virginia, on the George Mason campus. George Mason is coached by Tony Skinn. The Patriots have appeared six times in the NCAA tournament, most recently in 2011. In 2006, George Mason appeared in the NCAA Final Four, its best finish in program history.

== Team records ==
- Most wins – 27 during the 2005–06, 2010–11 and 2024–25 seasons
- Most losses – 23 during the 1969–70 season
- Longest Winning Streak – 16 during the 2010–2011 season

=== Game ===
- Most points – 42 by Carlos Yates (vs. Navy) on February 27, 1985
- Most field goals made – 18 by Rudolph Jones (vs. Bowie State) on January 18, 1973
- Most field goal attempts – 36 by Rudolph Jones (vs. Bowie State) on January 18, 1973
- Most 3-pointers made – 10 by Dre Smith (vs. James Madison) on January 19, 2008
- Most 3-pointers attempted – 20 by Riley Trone (vs. Troy State) on November 27, 1993
- Most free throws made – 20 by Terry Henderson (vs. Rider) on January 19, 1980
- Most free throws attempted – 23 by Terry Henderson (vs. Rider) on January 19, 1980
- Most rebounds – 24 by Jim Nowers (vs. D.C. Teachers) on February 23, 1974
- Most assists – 15 by Curtis McCants (vs. Richmond) on February 22, 1995
- Most blocks – 10 by Byron Tucker (vs. Miami (FL)) on November 23, 1990
- Most steals – 9 by Tony Skinn (vs. Northeastern) on January 19, 2006

=== Season ===
- Most points – 779 by Rudolph Jones in 1972–73 season
- Most field goals made – 327 by Rudolph Jones in 1972–73 season
- Most field goal attempts – 727 by Rudolph Jones in 1972–73 season
- Most 3-pointers made – 99 by Donald Ross in 1993–94 season
- Most 3-pointers attempted – 278 by Donald Ross in 1993–94 season
- Most free throws made – 209 by Carlos Yates in 1982–83 season
- Most free throws attempted – 266 by Carlos Yates in 1982–83 season
- Most rebounds – 369 by Marquise Moore in 2016–17 season
- Most assists – 251 by Curtis McCants in 1994–95 season
- Most blocks – 92 by A.J. Wilson in 2019–20 season
- Most steals – 96 by Myron Contee in 1978–79 season

=== Career ===
- Most points – 2,420 by Carlos Yates
- Most field goals made – 865 by Carlos Yates
- Most field goal attempts – 1,766 by Carlos Yates
- Most 3-pointers made – 251 by Donald Ross
- Most 3-pointers attempted – 737 by Donald Ross
- Most free throws made – 690 by Carlos Yates
- Most free throws attempted – 921 by Carlos Yates
- Most rebounds – 1,048 by Jim Nowers
- Most assists – 598 by Curtis McCants
- Most blocks – 212 by A.J. Wilson
- Most steals – 211 by George Evans

== Player honors ==
=== Eastern College Athletic Conference South (1978–1985) ===
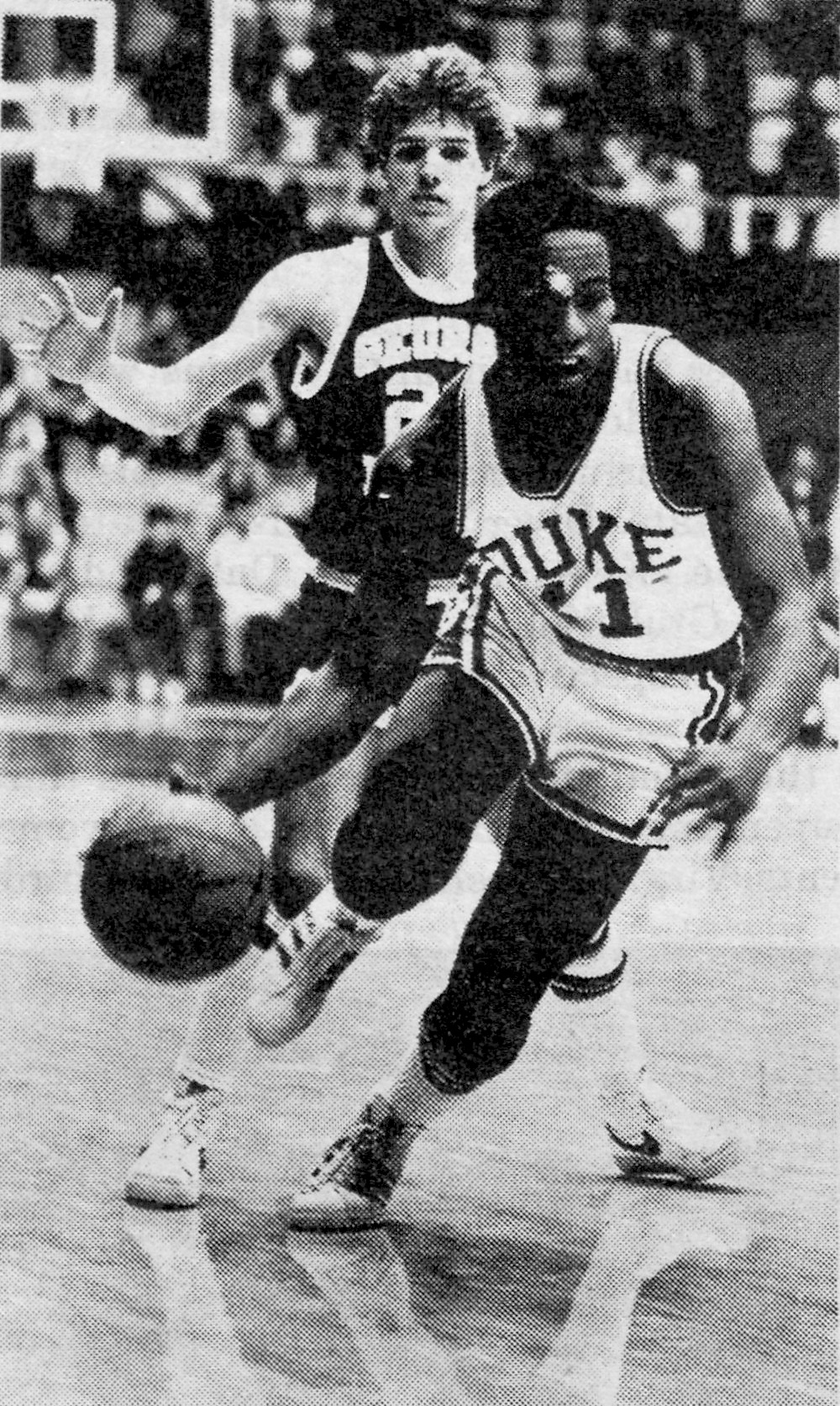
George Mason at Duke, 1981

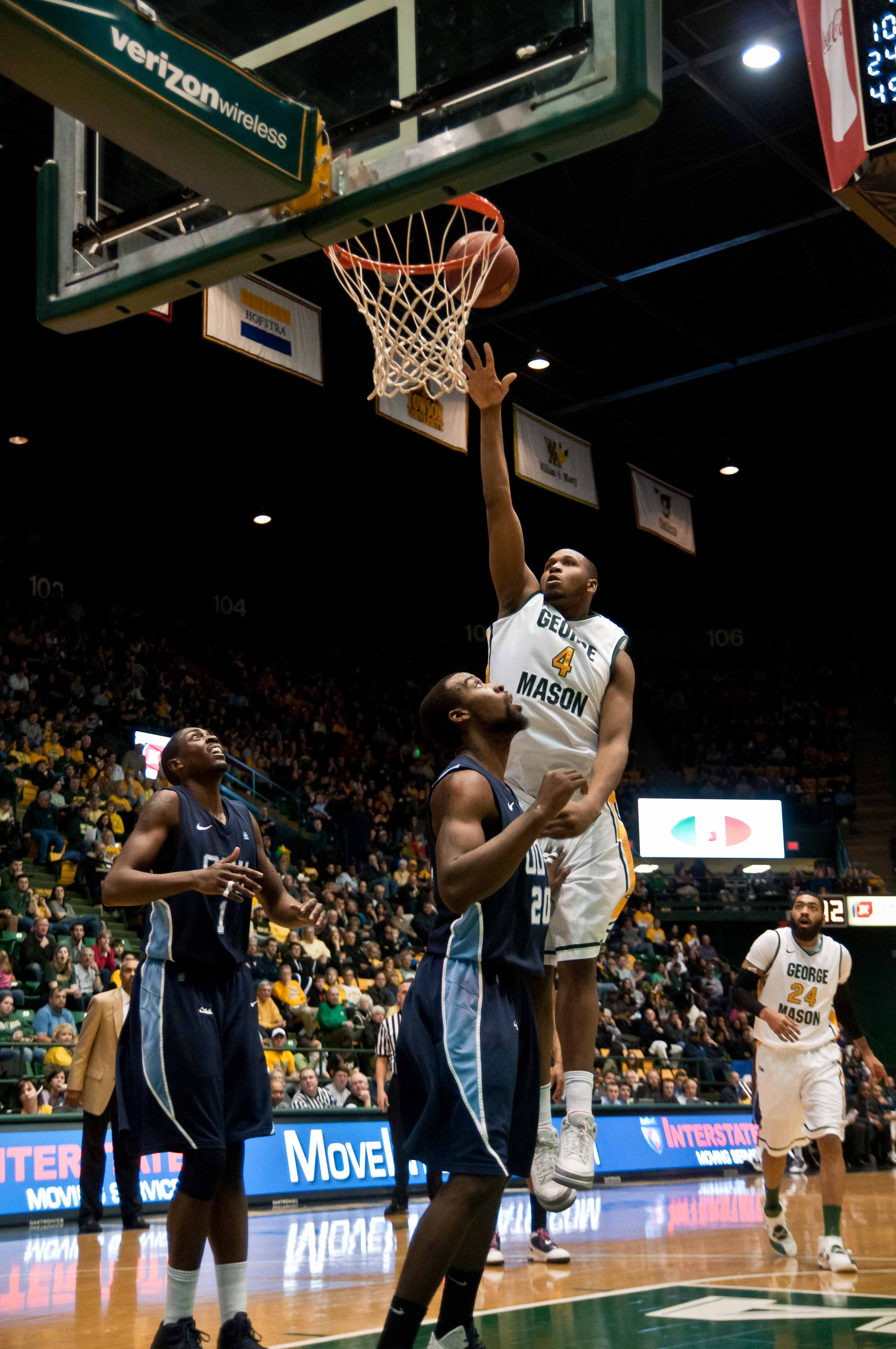
Erik Copes (#4 in white) of the George Mason Patriots shoots a layup against the Old Dominion Monarchs. Also depicted are Ryan Pearson (#24 in white), Nick Wright (#1 in blue), and Chris Cooper (#20 in blue)

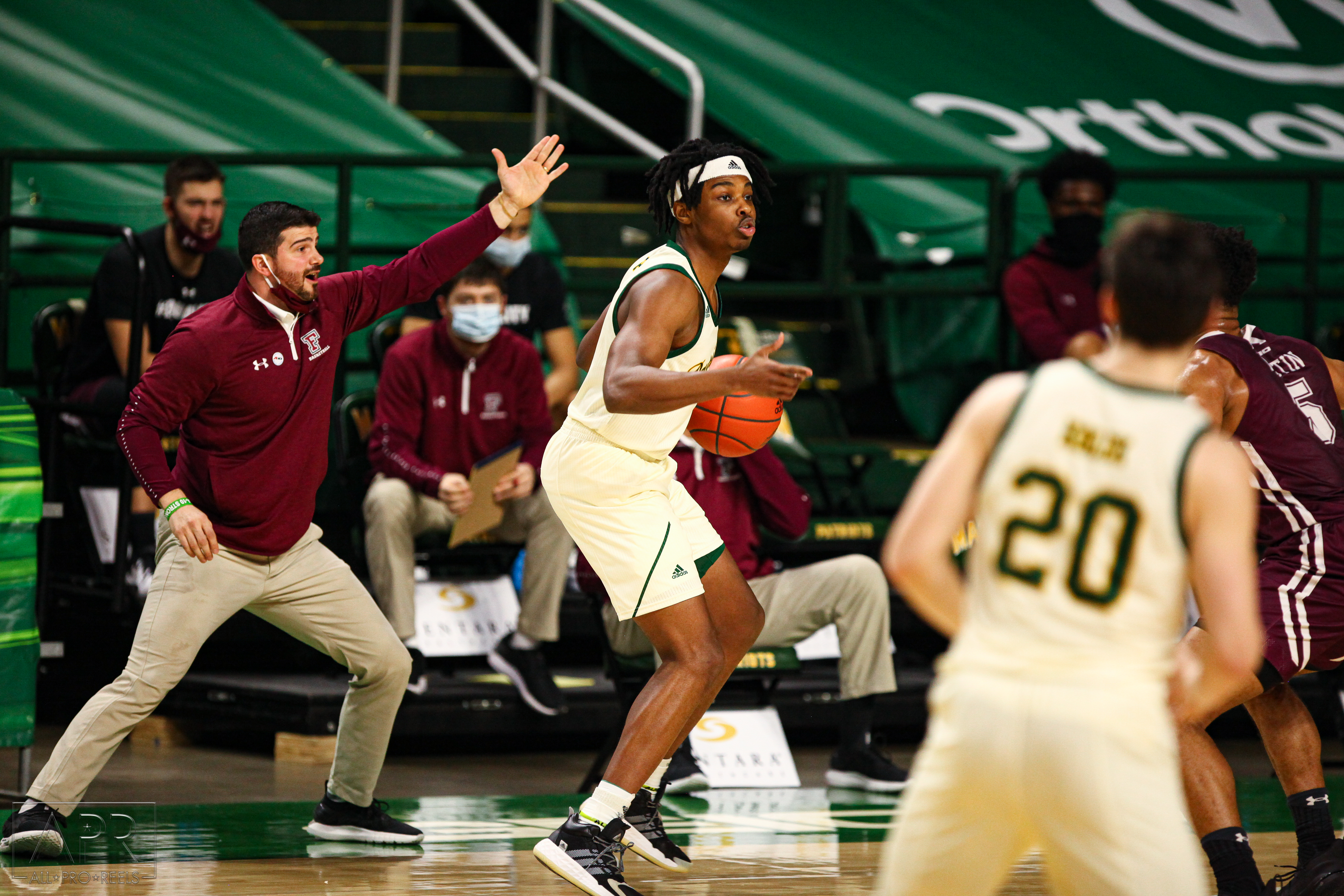
Ronald Polite dribbles the ball from George Mason vs. Fordham at Eagle Bank Arena, 2021

Player of the Year

Year	Player	Position	Class
1982–83	Carlos Yates	G/F	Sophomore

Rookie of the Year

Year	Player	Position
1980–81	Andy Bolden	G
1981–82	Carlos Yates	G/F

All-Conference

Year	Player	Team	Position	Class
1979–80	Andre Gaddy	1st	C	Sophomore
1981–82	Carlos Yates	1st	G/F	Freshman
1982–83	Carlos Yates	1st	G/F	Sophomore
1982–83	Ricky Wilson	1st	G	Sophomore
1983–84	Carlos Yates	1st	G/F	Junior
1984–85	Rob Rose	1st	G	Junior
1984–85	Carlos Yates	1st	G/F	Senior
1984–85	Ricky Wilson	2nd	G	Junior

=== Colonial Athletic Association (1986–2013) ===
Player of the Year

Year	Player	Position	Class
1987–88	Kenny Sanders	F	Junior
1998–99	George Evans	F	Sophomore
1999–00	George Evans	F	Junior
2000–01	George Evans	F	Senior
2011–12	Ryan Pearson	F	Senior

Rookie of the Year

Year	Player	Position
1985–86	Kenny Sanders	F
1993–94	Curtis McCants	G
1994–95	Nate Langley	G
1997–98	George Evans	F

All-Conference

Year	Player	Team	Position	Class
1985–86	Rob Rose	1st	G	Senior
1985–86	Ricky Wilson	2nd	G	Senior
1986–87	Kenny Sanders	1st	F	Sophomore
1987–88	Kenny Sanders	1st	F	Junior
1987–88	Anthony 'Amp' Davis	2nd	G	Senior
1988–89	Kenny Sanders	1st	F	Senior
1989–90	Robert Dykes	1st	F/C	Junior
1989–90	Mike Hargett	2nd	G	Junior
1989–90	Steve Smith	2nd	G	Senior
1990–91	Robert Dykes	1st	F/C	Senior
1990–91	Byron Tucker	2nd	F	Junior
1994–95	Nate Langley	2nd	G	Sophomore
1995–96	Curtis McCants	1st	G	Junior
1996–97	Nate Langley	1st	G	Senior
1997–98	George Evans	2nd	F	Freshman
1997–98	Jason Miskiri	2nd	G	Junior
1998–99	George Evans	1st	F	Sophomore
1998–99	Jason Miskiri	1st	G	Senior
1999–00	George Evans	1st	F	Junior
1999–00	Erik Herring	2nd	G	Junior
2000–01	George Evans	1st	F	Senior
2000–01	Erik Herring	1st	G	Senior
2001–02	Jesse Young	1st	F	Junior
2002–03	Mark Davis	2nd	F	Junior
2003–04	Jai Lewis	1st	F	Sophomore
2003–04	Mark Davis	2nd	F	Senior
2004–05	Lamar Butler	2nd	G	Junior
2004–05	Jai Lewis	2nd	F	Junior
2004–05	Tony Skinn	3rd	G	Junior
2005–06	Jai Lewis	1st	F	Senior
2005–06	Tony Skinn	2nd	G	Senior
2006–07	Will Thomas	2nd	F	Junior
2006–07	Folarin Campbell	3rd	G	Junior
2007–08	Will Thomas	1st	F	Senior
2007–08	Folarin Campbell	2nd	G	Senior
2008–09	Darryl Monroe	2nd	F	Senior
2008–09	John Vaughan	2nd	G	Senior
2008–09	Cam Long	3rd	G	Sophomore
2009–10	Cam Long	3rd	G	Junior
2010–11	Cam Long	1st	G	Senior
2010–11	Ryan Pearson	2nd	F	Junior
2010–11	Luke Hancock	3rd	F	Sophomore
2011–12	Ryan Pearson	1st	F	Senior
2012–13	Sherrod Wright	2nd	G	Junior

=== Atlantic 10 Conference (2014–present) ===
Defensive Player of the Year

Year	Player	Position
2024–25	Jared Billups	G

Rookie of the Year

Year	Player	Position
2020–21	Tyler Kolek	G

All-Conference

Year	Player	Team	Position	Class
2014–15	Shevon Thompson	3rd	F/C	Junior
2016–17	Marquise Moore	2nd	G	Senior
2017–18	Otis Livingston II	2nd	G	Junior
2018–19	Justin Kier	2nd	G	Junior
2020–21	Jordan Miller	3rd	G	Junior
2021–22	Josh Oduro	1st	F	Junior
2022–23	Josh Oduro	1st	F	Senior
2023–24	Keyshawn Hall	2nd	F	Sophomore
2024–25	Jalen Haynes	1st	F	Senior
2024–25	Darius Maddox	3rd	G	Senior
2025–26	Riley Allenspach	2nd	F	Junior
2025–26	Kory Mincy	2nd	G	Junior

== Notable players ==
- Bryon Allen (born 1992), basketball player for Hapoel Eilat of the Israeli Basketball Premier League
- Cameron Long (born 1988), basketball player in the Israeli Premier League
- Darryl Monroe (born 1986), professional basketball player, 2016 Israeli Basketball Premier League MVP

== Coaches ==
=== Current coaching staff ===
- Tony Skinn — Head Coach
- Steve Curran — Associate Head Coach
- Louis Hinnant — Associate Head Coach
- Andy Fox — Associate Head Coach
- Jesse Pruitt — Assistant Coach/Director of Basketball Operations

== Postseason results ==
=== NCAA Division I Tournament results ===
The Patriots have appeared in the NCAA tournament six times. Their combined record is 5–6.

Year	Seed	Round	Opponent	Result
1989	No. 15	First Round	No. 2 Indiana	L 85–99
1999	No. 14	First Round	No. 3 Cincinnati	L 48–72
2001	No. 14	First Round	No. 3 Maryland	L 80–83
2006	No. 11	First Round; Round of 32; Sweet Sixteen; Elite Eight; Final Four	No. 6 Michigan State; No. 3 North Carolina; No. 7 Wichita State; No. 1 Connecticut; No. 3 Florida	W 75–65; W 65–60; W 63–55; W 86–84 ^{OT} L 58–73
2008	No. 12	First Round	No. 5 Notre Dame	L 50–68
2011	No. 8	First Round; Round of 32	No. 9 Villanova; No. 1 Ohio State	W 61–57; L 66–98

=== NIT results ===
The Patriots have appeared in the National Invitation Tournament (NIT) six times. Their combined record is 4–6.

Year	Round	Opponent	Result
1986	First Round; Second Round	Lamar; Providence	W 65–63; L 71–90
2002	Opening Round	Saint Joseph's	L 64–73
2004	Opening Round; First Round; Second Round	Tennessee; Austin Peay; Oregon	W 58–55; W 66–60; L 54–68
2009	First Round	Penn State	L 73–77 ^{OT}
2025	First Round; Second Round	Samford; Bradley	W 86–69; L 67–75
2026	First Round	Liberty	L 71–77

=== CBI results ===
The Patriots have appeared in the College Basketball Invitational (CBI) two times. Their combined record is 4–3.

Year	Round	Opponent	Result
2013	First Round; Quarterfinals; Semi-finals; Finals Game 1 Finals Game 2 Finals Game 3	College of Charleston; Houston; Western Michigan; Santa Clara; Santa Clara; Santa Clara	W 78–77; W 88–84 ^{OT} W 62–52; L 73–81; W 73–66; L 77–80
2017	First Round	Loyola (MD)	L 58–73

=== CIT results ===
The Patriots have appeared in the CollegeInsider.com Postseason Tournament (CIT) one time. Their record is 0–1.

Year	Round	Opponent	Result
2010	First Round	Fairfield	L 96–101 ^{OT}
