= List of Richmond Spiders men's basketball seasons =

This is a list of seasons completed by the Richmond Spiders men's college basketball team.

== Seasons ==
Record table
Season	Coach	Overall	Conference	Standing	Postseason
Frank Dobson (Independent) (1913–1917)
1913–14	Frank Dobson	12–7			
1914–15	Frank Dobson	6–6			
1915–16	Frank Dobson	7–9			
1916–17	Frank Dobson	7–5			
Dave Satterfield (Independent) (1917–1918)
1917–18	Dave Satterfield	3–6			
Robert Marshall (Independent) (1918–1919)
1918–19	Robert Marshall	1–5			
Frank Dobson (Independent) (1919–1923)
1919–20	Frank Dobson	4–11			
1920–21	Frank Dobson	4–14			
1921–22	Frank Dobson	10–4			
1922–23	Frank Dobson	9–4			
Frank Dobson (Virginia Conference) (1923–1933)
1923–24	Frank Dobson	14–5	7–2		
1924–25	Frank Dobson	13–4	8–1		
1925–26	Frank Dobson	16–6	9–1		
1926–27	Frank Dobson	14–4	7–3		
1927–28	Frank Dobson	11–5	7–3		
1928–29	Frank Dobson	10–5	8–2		
1929–30	Frank Dobson	7–8	5–6		
1930–31	Frank Dobson	6–8	3–6		
1931–32	Frank Dobson	10–3	7–3		
1932–33	Frank Dobson	8–4	6–4		
Malcolm Pitt (Virginia Conference) (1933–1934)
1933–34	Malcolm Pitt	10–5	4–4		
Malcolm Pitt (Independent) (1934–1936)
1934–35	Malcolm Pitt	20–0			
1935–36	Malcolm Pitt	14–6			
Malcolm Pitt (Southern Conference) (1936–1952)
1936–37	Malcolm Pitt	13–7	5–4	7th	
1937–38	Malcolm Pitt	15–5	7–4	6th	
1938–39	Malcolm Pitt	10–10	5–5	T–8th	
1939–40	Malcolm Pitt	11–6	5–4	7th	
1940–41	Malcolm Pitt	11–10	7–5	7th	
1941–42	Malcolm Pitt	9–10	4–8	T–11th	
1942–43	Malcolm Pitt	11–5	4–4	T–9th	
1943–44	Malcolm Pitt	7–6	2–2	5th	
1944–45	Malcolm Pitt	3–4	2–0	2nd	
1945–46	Malcolm Pitt	8–12	3–7	13th	
1946–47	Malcolm Pitt	17–9	8–5	6th	
1947–48	Malcolm Pitt	8–14	4–9	13th	
1948–49	Malcolm Pitt	8–15	5–10	13th	
1949–50	Malcolm Pitt	8–16	4–13	14th	
1950–51	Malcolm Pitt	7–14	5–10	12th	
1951–52	Malcolm Pitt	7–15	3–11	T–13th	
H. Lester Hooker (Southern Conference) (1952–1963)
1952–53	H. Lester Hooker	20–7	13–5	7th	
1953–54	H. Lester Hooker	23–8	10–3	3rd	
1954–55	H. Lester Hooker	19–9	10–4	3rd	
1955–56	H. Lester Hooker	16–13	8–6	4th	
1956–57	H. Lester Hooker	15–11	9–7	5th	
1957–58	H. Lester Hooker	14–12	8–8	T–5th	
1958–59	H. Lester Hooker	11–11	6–8	5th	
1959–60	H. Lester Hooker	7–18	2–12	8th	
1960–61	H. Lester Hooker	9–14	5–11	6th	
1961–62	H. Lester Hooker	6–21	5–11	T–8th	
1962–63	H. Lester Hooker	7–18	3–13	8th	
Lewis Mills (Southern Conference) (1963–1974)
1963–64	Lewis Mills	6–16	4–12	9th	
1964–65	Lewis Mills	10–16	6–10	7th	
1965–66	Lewis Mills	12–13	9–7	4th	
1966–67	Lewis Mills	11–12	9–7	4th	
1967–68	Lewis Mills	12–13	7–8	6th	
1968–69	Lewis Mills	13–14	6–8	4th	
1969–70	Lewis Mills	9–18	4–9	7th	
1970–71	Lewis Mills	7–21	3–9	6th	
1971–72	Lewis Mills	6–19	3–9	6th	
1972–73	Lewis Mills	8–16	5–9	6th	
1973–74	Lewis Mills	16–12	10–4	2nd	
Carl Slone (Southern Conference) (1974–1976)
1974–75	Carl Slone	10–16	7–7	T–4th	
1975–76	Carl Slone	14–14	7–7	T–3rd	
Carl Slone (Independent) (1976–1978)
1976–77	Carl Slone	15–11			
1977–78	Carl Slone	4–22			
Lou Goetz (Independent) (1978–1979)
1978–79	Lou Goetz	10–16			
Lou Goetz (Colonial Athletic Association) (1979–1981)
1979–80	Lou Goetz	13–14	4–3		
1980–81	Lou Goetz	15–14	5–6		
Dick Tarrant (Colonial Athletic Association) (1981–1993)
1981–82	Dick Tarrant	18–11	6–4		NIT first round
1982–83	Dick Tarrant	12–16	2–7		
1983–84	Dick Tarrant	22–10	7–3	1st	NCAA Division I second round
1984–85	Dick Tarrant	21–11	11–3	T–1st	NIT second round
1985–86	Dick Tarrant	23–7	12–2	2nd	NCAA Division I first round
1986–87	Dick Tarrant	15–14	8–6	3rd	
1987–88	Dick Tarrant	26–7	11–3	1st	NCAA Division I Sweet Sixteen
1988–89	Dick Tarrant	21–10	13–1	1st	NIT second round
1989–90	Dick Tarrant	22–10	10–4	T–2nd	NCAA Division I first round
1990–91	Dick Tarrant	22–10	10–4	2nd	NCAA Division I second round
1991–92	Dick Tarrant	22–8	12–2	T–1st	NIT first round
1992–93	Dick Tarrant	15–12	10–4	3rd	
Bill Dooley (Colonial Athletic Association) (1993–1997)
1993–94	Bill Dooley	14–14	8–6	4th	
1994–95	Bill Dooley	8–20	3–11	7th	
1995–96	Bill Dooley	8–20	3–13	9th	
1996–97	Bill Dooley	13–15	7–9	8th	
John Beilein (Colonial Athletic Association) (1997–2001)
1997–98	John Beilein	23–8	12–4	3rd	NCAA Division I second round
1998–99	John Beilein	15–12	10–6	3rd	
1999–00	John Beilein	18–12	11–5	3rd	
2000–01	John Beilein	22–7	12–4	1st	NIT second round
John Beilein (Atlantic 10 Conference) (2001–2002)
2001–02	John Beilein	22–14	11–5	2nd (West)	NIT Quarterfinal
Jerry Wainwright (Atlantic 10 Conference) (2002–2005)
2002–03	Jerry Wainwright	16–13	10–6	3rd (West)	NIT Opening Round
2003–04	Jerry Wainwright	20–13	10–6	T–3rd (West)	NCAA Division I first round
2004–05	Jerry Wainwright	14–15	8–8	4th (West)	
Chris Mooney (Atlantic 10 Conference) (2005–present)
2005–06	Chris Mooney	13–17	6–10	T–11th	
2006–07	Chris Mooney	8–22	4–12	T–12th	
2007–08	Chris Mooney	16–15	9–7	T–4th	CBI first round
2008–09	Chris Mooney	20–16	9–7	T–5th	CBI Semifinal
2009–10	Chris Mooney	26–9	13–3	3rd	NCAA Division I first round
2010–11	Chris Mooney	29–8	13–3	3rd	NCAA Division I Sweet Sixteen
2011–12	Chris Mooney	16–16	7–9	T–9th	
2012–13	Chris Mooney	19–15	8–8	T–8th	CBI Quarterfinal
2013–14	Chris Mooney	19–14	8–8	7th	
2014–15	Chris Mooney	21–14	12–6	T–4th	NIT Quarterfinal
2015–16	Chris Mooney	16–16	7–11	9th	
2016–17	Chris Mooney	22–12	13–5	T–3rd	NIT Quarterfinal
2017–18	Chris Mooney	12–20	9–9	T–5th	
2018–19	Chris Mooney	13–20	6–12	T–10th	
2019–20	Chris Mooney	24–7	14–4	2nd	No postseason held
2020–21	Chris Mooney	14–9	6–5	8th	NIT Quarterfinal
2021–22	Chris Mooney	24–13	10–8	6th	NCAA Division I Round of 32
2022–23	Chris Mooney / Peter Thomas (interim)	15–18	7–11	T–11th	
2023–24	Chris Mooney	23–10	15–3	T–1st	NIT first round
2024–25	Chris Mooney	10–22	5–13	T–13th	
2025–26	Chris Mooney	15–17	5–13	T–11th	
2026–27	Chris Mooney	3–3	0–0		
Total:		1,517–1,314			
National champion Postseason invitational champion Conference regular season champion Conference regular season and conference tournament champion Division regular season champion Division regular season and conference tournament champion Conference tournament champion
