= Richmond Spiders men's basketball statistical leaders =

The Richmond Spiders men's basketball statistical leaders are individual statistical leaders of the Richmond Spiders men's basketball program in various categories, including points, three-pointers, assists, blocks, rebounds, and steals. Within those areas, the lists identify single-game, single-season, and career leaders. The Spiders represent the University of Richmond in the NCAA's Atlantic 10 Conference.

Richmond began competing in intercollegiate basketball in 1913. However, the school's record book does not generally list records from before the 1950s, as records from before this period are often incomplete and inconsistent. Since scoring was much lower in this era, and teams played much fewer games during a typical season, it is likely that few or no players from this era would appear on these lists anyway.

The NCAA did not officially record assists as a stat until the 1983–84 season, and blocks and steals until the 1985–86 season, but Richmond's record books includes players in these stats before these seasons.

== Scoring ==
Career
Rk	Player	Points	Seasons
1	Johnny Newman	2,383	1982–83 1983–84 1984–85 1985–86
2	Grant Golden	2,246	2016–17 2017–18 2018–19 2019–20 2020–21 2021–22
3	Kevin Anderson	2,165	2007–08 2008–09 2009–10 2010–11
4	Mike Perry	2,145	1977–78 1978–79 1979–80 1980–81
5	Jacob Gilyard	2,039	2017–18 2018–19 2019–20 2020–21 2021–22
6	Kendall Anthony	1,909	2011–12 2012–13 2013–14 2014–15
7	Ed Harrison	1,843	1952–53 1953–54 1954–55 1955–56
8	David Gonzalvez	1,727	2006–07 2007–08 2008–09 2009–10
9	John Schweitz	1,723	1978–79 1979–80 1980–81 1981–82
10	T.J. Cline	1,647	2014–15 2015–16 2016–17

Season
Rk	Player	Points	Season
1	Bob McCurdy	855	1974–75
2	Johnny Newman	701	1983–84
3	Johnny Newman	680	1984–85
4	Aron Stewart	663	1973–74
5	Justin Harper	661	2010–11
6	Mike Perry	660	1980–81
7	Johnny Newman	659	1985–86
8	T.J. Cline	648	2016–17
9	Tyler Burton	627	2022–23
10	Kevin Anderson	622	2009–10

Single game
Rk	Player	Points	Season	Opponent
1	Bob McCurdy	53	1974–75	Appalachian St.
2	Bob McCurdy	46	1974–75	West Virginia
3	Bob McCurdy	44	1974–75	VMI
4	Wiley Wood	43	1915–16	Jefferson School
5	Aron Stewart	42	1972–73	Appalachian St.
	Bob McCurdy	42	1974–75	Duquesne
7	Wilton Ford	41	1967–68	William & Mary
	Aron Stewart	41	1972–73	Virginia Tech
	Bob McCurdy	41	1974–75	Tulane
10	Elmo Stephenson	40	1951–52	Mount Union
	Bob McCurdy	40	1974–75	Furman

== Rebounds ==
Career
Rk	Player	Rebounds	Seasons
1	Ken Daniel	1,255	1952–53 1953–54 1954–55 1955–56
2	Walt Lysaght	1,190	1952–53 1953–54 1954–55 1955–56
3	Grant Golden	1,015	2016–17 2017–18 2018–19 2019–20 2020–21 2021–22
4	Eric Poole	894	1994–95 1995–96 1996–97 1997–98
5	Peter Woolfolk	859	1984–85 1985–86 1986–87 1987–88
6	Tyler Burton	819	2019–20 2020–21 2021–22 2022–23
7	Terry Allen	782	2012–13 2013–14 2014–15 2015–16
8	Mike Perry	738	1977–78 1978–79 1979–80 1980–81
9	Tom Green	728	1964–65 1965–66 1966–67
10	Kenny Wood	717	1989–90 1990–91 1991–92 1992–93

Season
Rk	Player	Rebounds	Season
1	Ken Daniel	421	1954–55
2	Walt Lysaght	335	1952–53
3	Walt Lysaght	333	1954–55
4	Ken Daniel	328	1953–54
5	Aron Stewart	300	1973–74
6	Peter Woolfolk	294	1987–88
7	Tyler Burton	285	2021–22
8	Tom Green	276	1966–67
9	Walt Lysaght	274	1955–56
	Jeff Butler	274	1975–76

Single game
Rk	Player	Rebounds	Season	Opponent
1	Walt Lysaght	35	1952–53	North Carolina
2	Walt Lysaght	35	1952–53	Virginia
3	Ken Daniel	28	1952–53	North Carolina
4	George Grodzicki	25	1961–62	George Washington
5	Ken Daniel	24	1954–55	Virginia
	Curt Adkins	24	1955–56	Wake Forest
7	Bob Witt	22	1953–54	Washington & Lee
8	Tom Green	20	1965–66	George Washington
	Bob Boehling	20	1978–79	Vanderbilt
	Peter Woolfolk	20	1986–87	Fairfeld

== Assists ==
Career
Rk	Player	Assists	Seasons
1	Jacob Gilyard	782	2017–18 2018–19 2019–20 2020–21 2021–22
2	Greg Beckwith	573	1982–83 1983–84 1984–85 1985–86
3	Scott Ungerer	479	1998–99 1999–00 2000–01 2001–02
4	Grant Golden	476	2016–17 2017–18 2018–19 2019–20 2020–21 2021–22
5	Kenny Atkinson	464	1986–87 1987–88 1988–89 1989–90
6	Kevin Anderson	410	2007–08 2008–09 2009–10 2010–11
7	Carlos Cueto	396	1994–95 1995–96 1996–97 1997–98
8	Scott Stapleton	382	1986–87 1987–88 1988–89 1989–90
9	T.J. Cline	374	2014–15 2015–16 2016–17
10	ShawnDre' Jones	364	2013–14 2014–15 2015–16 2016–17

Season
Rk	Player	Assists	Season
1	Greg Beckwith	200	1985–86
2	Jacob Gilyard	198	2021–22
3	T.J. Cline	197	2016–17
4	Greg Beckwith	189	1984–85
5	Jacob Gilyard	178	2019–20
6	Kenny Atkinson	165	1987–88
7	Jacob Gilyard	160	2018–19
8	Scott Ungerer	149	2001–02
9	Scott Ungerer	143	1999–00
10	ShawnDre' Jones	136	2016–17

Single game
Rk	Player	Assists	Season	Opponent
1	Greg Beckwith	16	1985–86	Navy
2	Greg Beckwith	14	1984–85	UNC Wilmington
3	Kevin Eastman	13	1976–77	William & Mary
	Greg Beckwith	13	1984–85	Navy
5	T.J. Cline	12	2016–17	Saint Louis
	Khwan Fore	12	2016–17	Fordham
	Carlos Cueto	12	1995–96	American
	John Campbell	12	1977–78	Old Dominion
	Greg Beckwith	12	1984–85	George Mason
	Greg Beckwith	12	1985–86	St. Joseph's

== Steals ==
NCAA Division I record

Career
Rk	Player	Steals	Seasons
1	Jacob Gilyard	466	2017–18 2018–19 2019–20 2020–21 2021–22
2	Greg Beckwith	227	1982–83 1983–84 1984–85 1985–86
3	Tony Dobbins	223	2001–02 2002–03 2003–04
4	Kevin Anderson	217	2007–08 2008–09 2009–10 2010–11
5	John Davis	182	1982–83 1983–84 1984–85 1985–86
6	David Gonzalvez	175	2006–07 2007–08 2008–09 2009–10
7	Ryan Butler	174	2005–06 2006–07 2007–08 2008–09 2009–10
8	Jonathan Baker	148	1995–96 1996–97 1997–98 1998–99
9	Johnny Newman	145	1982–83 1983–84 1984–85 1985–86
10	Terry Allen	138	2012–13 2013–14 2014–15 2015–16

Season
Rk	Player	Steals	Season
1	Jacob Gilyard	108	2021–22
2	Jacob Gilyard	99	2019–20
3	Jacob Gilyard	89	2017–18
4	Jacob Gilyard	88	2018–19
5	Tony Dobbins	85	2003–04
6	Jacob Gilyard	82	2020–21
7	Greg Beckwith	77	1985–86
8	Greg Beckwith	70	1983–84
	Tony Dobbins	70	2001–02
10	Tony Dobbins	68	2002–03

Single game
Rk	Player	Steals	Season	Opponent
1	Tony Dobbins	8	2002–03	UMass
	Kevin Eastman	8	1975–76	Davidson
3	Jacob Gilyard	7	2021–22	North Carolina Central
	Jacob Gilyard	7	2019–20	Vanderbilt
	Jacob Gilyard	7	2018–19	High Point
	Jacob Gilyard	7	2018–19	Oral Roberts
	Gerald Jarmon	7	1993–94	East Carolina
	Greg Beckwith	7	1983–84	UNC Wilmington
	Greg Beckwith	7	1985–86	William & Mary

== Blocks ==
Career
Rk	Player	Blocks	Seasons
1	Darrius Garrett	231	2008–09 2009–10 2010–11 2011–12
2	Alonzo Nelson-Ododa	185	2012–13 2013–14 2014–15
3	Tim Faulconer	183	1998–99 1999–00 2000–01 2001–02
4	Kevin Steenberge	154	2002–03 2003–04 2004–05 2005–06
5	Jeff Pehl	135	1979–80 1980–81 1981–82 1982–83
6	Johnathan Collins	133	1999–00 2000–01 2001–02 2002–03
	Gaston Moliva	133	2003–04 2004–05 2005–06 2006–07 2007–08
8	Grant Golden	130	2016–17 2017–18 2018–19 2019–20 2020–21 2021–22
9	Justin Harper	113	2007–08 2008–09 2009–10 2010–11
10	Eric Poole	92	1994–95 1995–96 1996–97 1997–98

Season
Rk	Player	Blocks	Season
1	Darrius Garrett	107	2011–12
2	Alonzo Nelson-Ododa	78	2013–14
3	Johnathan Collins	77	2001–02
4	Tim Faulconer	73	1999–00
5	Kevin Steenberge	71	2005–06
6	Tim Faulconer	65	2000–01
7	Alonzo Nelson-Ododa	62	2012–13
8	Darrius Garrett	60	2009–10
9	Darrius Garrett	59	2010–11
10	Jeff Pehl	56	1981–82

Single game
Rk	Player	Blocks	Season	Opponent
1	Darrius Garrett	14	2009–10	Massachusetts
2	Tim Faulconer	10	1999–00	Liberty
3	Darrius Garrett	9	2011–12	Old Dominion
4	Joe Jon Bryant	8	1988–89	William & Mary
5	Darrius Garrett	7	2011–12	Illinois
6	Jeff Pehl	6	1981–82	Delaware Valley
	Jeff Pehl	6	1981–82	East Carolina
	Mike Winiecki	6	1988–89	American
	Derrick Wall	6	1994–95	American
	Johnathan Collins	6	2001–02	Dayton
	Darrius Garrett	6	2010–11	Arizona State
	Darrius Garrett	6	2011–12	Sacred Heart
	Darrius Garrett	6	2011–12	UNCG
	Darrius Garrett	6	2011–12	La Salle
	Alonzo Nelson-Ododa	6	2012–13	Saint Louis
	Grant Golden	6	2018–19	George Mason
