= Carl Slone =

American basketball coach (1937–2020)

Biographical details
- Born: February 6, 1937; Majestic, Kentucky, U.S.
- Died: February 26, 2020 (aged 83); Richmond, Virginia, U.S.

Playing career
- 1957–1960: Richmond
- Position: Forward

Coaching career (HC unless noted)
- 1960–1962: Stafford HS
- 1962–1967: Varina HS
- 1967–1969: William & Mary (assistant)
- 1969–1970: George Washington (assistant)
- 1970–1974: George Washington
- 1974–1978: Richmond

Head coaching record
- Overall: 97–111

Accomplishments and honors

Awards
- All-Southern Conference (1960)

Carl Johnson Slone (February 6, 1937 – February 26, 2020) was an American college basketball coach. He was the head men's basketball coach at George Washington University from 1970 to 1974 and the University of Richmond from 1974 to 1978. Slone also played for the Spiders from 1957 to 1960 and was a three-year starter at forward under head coach H. Lester Hooker. He led the Spiders in both scoring and rebounding as a senior.

== Head coaching record ==
Record table
Season	Team	Overall	Conference	Standing	Postseason
George Washington Colonials (Independent) (1970–1974)
1970–71	George Washington	11–14			
1971–72	George Washington	11–14			
1972–73	George Washington	17–9			
1973–74	George Washington	15–11			
George Washington:		54–48 (.529)			
Richmond Spiders (Southern Conference) (1974–1976)
1974–75	Richmond	10–16	7–7	4th	
1975–76	Richmond	14–14	7–7	T–3rd	
Richmond Spiders (Independent) (1976–1978)
1976–77	Richmond	15–11			
1977–78	Richmond	4–22			
Richmond:		43–63 (.406)	14–14 (.500)		
Total:		97–111 (.466)			
