= William Dooley (disambiguation) =

Bill, Billy or William Dooley may refer to:

== Performers ==
- Billy Dooley (actor) (1893–1938), American stage and film comedian in 1932's Manhattan Tower (film)
- William Dooley (1932–2019), American bass-baritone opera singer

== Sportsmen ==
- Willie Dooley, Irish hurler from Limerick in 1952 South Liberties GAA
- Bill Dooley (1934–2016), American football player, coach and college athletics administrator
- Bill Dooley (basketball) (born 1960), American college player and coach
- Billy Dooley (born 1969), Irish hurler from Offaly
