= 2018–19 Dayton Flyers men's basketball team =

American college basketball season

2018–19 Dayton Flyers men's basketball

NIT, First Round
- Conference: Atlantic 10 Conference
- Record: 21–12 (13–5 A-10)
- Head coach: Anthony Grant (2nd season)
- Associate head coach: Anthony Solomon
- Assistant coaches: Donnie Jones; Ricardo Greer
- Home arena: UD Arena

2018–19 Atlantic 10 men's basketball standings
	Conf.				Overall
Team	W		L	PCT	W		L	PCT
VCU	16	–	2	.889	25	–	8	.758
Davidson	14	–	4	.778	24	–	10	.706
Dayton	13	–	5	.722	21	–	12	.636
St. Bonaventure	12	–	6	.667	18	–	16	.529
George Mason	11	–	7	.611	18	–	15	.545
Saint Louis †	10	–	8	.556	23	–	13	.639
Duquesne	10	–	8	.556	19	–	13	.594
Rhode Island	9	–	9	.500	18	–	15	.545
La Salle	8	–	10	.444	10	–	21	.323
Saint Joseph's	6	–	12	.333	14	–	19	.424
Richmond	6	–	12	.333	13	–	20	.394
George Washington	4	–	14	.222	9	–	24	.273
Massachusetts	4	–	14	.222	11	–	21	.344
Fordham	3	–	15	.167	12	–	20	.375
† 2019 Atlantic 10 tournament winner

The 2018–19 Dayton Flyers men's basketball team represented the University of Dayton during the 2018–19 NCAA Division I men's basketball season. The Flyers were led by second-year head coach Anthony Grant and played their home games at the University of Dayton Arena as members of the Atlantic 10 Conference. They finished the season 21–12, 13-5 to finish in 3rd place. As the No. 3 seed in the A-10 Tournament, they lost to Saint Louis in the quarterfinals. They received an at-large bid to the NIT where they lost in the first round to Colorado.

== Previous season ==
The Flyers finished the 2017–18 season 14–17, 8–10 in A-10 play to finish in ninth place. They lost in the second round of the A-10 tournament to VCU.

== Offseason ==
=== Departures ===
Name	Number	Pos.	Height	Weight	Year	Hometown	Reason for departure
Darrell Davis	1	G	6'5"	170	Senior	Detroit, MI	Graduated
Matej Svoboda	11	F	6'7"	224	Freshman	Ostrave, Czech Republic	Signed to play professionally in Czech Republic with Tuři Svitavy
Kostas Antetokounmpo	13	F	6'10"	197	RS Freshman	Athens, Greece	Declare for 2018 NBA draft
Jordan Pierce	14	C	6'11"	265	Freshman	Scotch Plains, NJ	Transferred to Odessa College
John Crosby	15	G	6'3"	197	Junior	Baltimore, MD	Transferred to Delaware State
Xeyrius Williams	20	F	6'9"	205	Junior	Huber Heights, OH	Transferred to Akron
Joey Gruden	44	G	6'1"	185	RS Senior	Leesburg, VA	Walk-on; graduated

=== Incoming transfers ===
Name	Number	Pos.	Height	Weight	Year	Hometown	Previous School
Jhery Matos	31	G	6'6"		Junior	Santo Domingo, Dominic Republic	Junior college transferred from Monroe College
Jordy Tshimanga		C	6'11"	268	Junior	Montreal, QE	Transferred from Nebraska. Under NCAA transfer rules, Tshimanga will have to sit out for the 2018–19 season. Will have two years of remaining eligibility.
Ibi Watson		G/F	6'5"	200	Junior	Pickerington, OH	Transferred from Michigan. Under NCAA transfer rules, Watson will have to sit out for the 2018–19 season. Will have two years of remaining eligibility.
Rodney Chatman		G	6'1"	175	Junior	Lithonia, GA	Transferred from UT Chattanooga. Under NCAA transfer rules, Chatman will have to sit out for the 2018–19 season. Will have two years of remaining eligibility.

=== Recruiting class of 2018 ===
College recruiting information
Name	Hometown	School	Height	Weight	Commit date
Dwayne Cohill #35 PG	Parma Heights, OH	Holy Name High School	6 ft 1 in (1.85 m)	175 lb (79 kg)	Sep 11, 2017
Dwayne Cohill #35 PG	Recruit ratings: Scout: Rivals: (80)				
Frankie Policelli #55 SF	New Hartford, NY	Long Island Lutheran High School	6 ft 8 in (2.03 m)	205 lb (93 kg)	
Frankie Policelli #55 SF	Recruit ratings: Scout: Rivals: (79)				
Overall recruit ranking:
Note: In many cases, Scout, Rivals, 247Sports, On3, and ESPN may conflict in their listings of height and weight.; In these cases, the average was taken. ESPN grades are on a 100-point scale.; Sources: "2018 Team Ranking". Rivals.

== Honors and awards ==
=== Preseason Awards ===
Street & Smith's

- All-Conference – Josh Cunningham

Athlon Sports

- All-Atlantic 10 First Team – Josh Cunningham

Lindy's Sports

- All-Conference Second Team – Josh Cunningham

== Roster ==
2018–19 Dayton Flyers men's basketball team
Players
Coaches

Pos.	#	Name	Height	Weight	Year	Previous school	Hometown
F	0	Josh Cunningham	6 ft 7 in (2.01 m)	233 lb (106 kg)	RS Sr	Morgan Park; Bradley	Chicago, IL
F	1	Obi Toppin	6 ft 8 in (2.03 m)	220 lb (100 kg)	RS Fr	Mt. Zion Prep (MD)	Ossining, NY
G/F	2	Frankie Policelli	6 ft 8 in (2.03 m)	205 lb (93 kg)	RS Fr	Long Island Lutheran	New Hartford, NY
G/F	3	Trey Landers	6 ft 5 in (1.96 m)	224 lb (102 kg)	Jr	Wayne	Huber Heights, OH
G	4	Jordan Davis	6 ft 2 in (1.88 m)	195 lb (88 kg)	So	Dutch Fork	Irmo, SC
G	10	Jalen Crutcher	6 ft 1 in (1.85 m)	161 lb (73 kg)	So	Ridgeway	Memphis, TN
G	23	Jack Westerfield (W)	6 ft 1 in (1.85 m)	180 lb (82 kg)	Sr	St. Xavier	Cincinnati, OH
G	31	Jhery Matos	6 ft 6 in (1.98 m)	190 lb (86 kg)	Jr	West Oaks Academy; Monroe College	Santo Domingo, DR
F	33	Ryan Mikesell	6 ft 7 in (2.01 m)	215 lb (98 kg)	RS Jr	St. Henry	St. Henry, OH
G	35	Dwayne Cohill	6 ft 4 in (1.93 m)	176 lb (80 kg)	Fr	Holy Name	Cleveland, OH
G	51	Jabali Leonard (W)	6 ft 1 in (1.85 m)	180 lb (82 kg)	So	Meadowdale	Dayton, OH
G	52	Camron Greer (W)	5 ft 7 in (1.7 m)	160 lb (73 kg)	So	Rich Central	Country Club Hills, IL
G	53	Christian Wilson (W)	6 ft 1 in (1.85 m)	160 lb (73 kg)	RS Fr	Northmont	Dayton, OH
G		Rodney Chatman (I) (redshirt)	6 ft 1 in (1.85 m)	178 lb (81 kg)	Jr	Lithonia; Chattanooga	Lithonia, Georgia
C		Jordy Tshimanga (I) (redshirt)	6 ft 11 in (2.11 m)	268 lb (122 kg)	Jr	The MacDuffie School; Nebraska	Montreal, QC
G		Ibi Watson (I) (redshirt)	6 ft 5 in (1.96 m)	200 lb (91 kg)	Jr	Pickerington Central; Michigan	Pickerington, OH

Head coach

- Anthony Grant (Dayton)

Assistant coach(es)

- Anthony Solomon (Virginia)
- Donnie Jones (Pikeville)
- Ricardo Greer (Pittsburgh)

Legend

- (C) Team captain
- (S) Suspended
- (I) Ineligible
- (W) Walk-on
- Injured
- Current redshirt

Roster

== Schedule and results ==
Date time, TV	Rank^{#}	Opponent^{#}	Result	Record	Site (attendance) city, state
Exhibition
November 2, 2018*; 7:00 pm		Capital	W 89–71		UD Arena (12,446); Dayton, OH
Non-conference regular season
November 7, 2018*; 7:00 pm, SPEC OH		North Florida	W 78–70	1–0	UD Arena (12,522); Dayton, OH
November 10, 2018*; 7:00 pm, SPEC OH		Coppin State; Battle 4 Atlantis campus-site game	W 76–46	2–0	UD Arena (12,849); Dayton, OH
November 16, 2018*; 7:00 pm, FSOH		Purdue Fort Wayne	W 91–80	3–0	UD Arena (13,004); Dayton, OH
November 21, 2018*; 7:00 pm, ESPNews		vs. Butler; Battle 4 Atlantis Quarterfinals	W 69–64	4–0	Imperial Arena (1,452); Nassau, Bahamas
November 22, 2018*; 3:30 pm, ESPN		vs. No. 4 Virginia; Battle 4 Atlantis Semifinals	L 56–64	4–1	Imperial Arena (2,258); Nassau, Bahamas
November 23, 2018*; 11:30 am, ESPN2		vs. Oklahoma; Battle 4 Atlantis 3rd place game	L 54–65	4–2	Imperial Arena (1,052); Nassau, Bahamas
November 30, 2018*; 7:00 pm, CBSSN		No. 25 Mississippi State	L 58–65	4–3	UD Arena (13,455); Dayton, OH
December 4, 2018*; 7:00 pm		Detroit	W 98–59	5–3	UD Arena (12,700); Dayton, OH
December 8, 2018*; 8:30 pm, SECN		at No. 8 Auburn	L 72–82	5–4	Auburn Arena (8,365); Auburn, AL
December 16, 2018*; 3:30 pm, CBSSN		vs. Tulsa; Hall of Fame Holiday Showcase	L 67–72	5–5	Mohegan Sun Arena; Uncasville, CT
December 19, 2018*; 7:00 pm		Western Michigan	W 85–72	6–5	UD Arena (12,590); Dayton, OH
December 22, 2018*; 2:00 pm		Presbyterian	W 81–69	7–5	UD Arena (13,147); Dayton, OH
December 29, 2018*; 3:30 pm, NBCSN		Georgia Southern	W 94–90	8–5	UD Arena (13,147); Dayton, OH
Atlantic 10 regular season
January 6, 2019; 12:30 pm, NBCSN		Richmond	W 72–48	9–5 (1–0)	UD Arena (13,147); Dayton, OH
January 9, 2019; 7:00 pm		at George Washington	W 72–66	10–5 (2–0)	Charles E. Smith Center (2,325); Washington, D.C.
January 13, 2019; 3:30 pm, NBCSN		Massachusetts	W 72–67	11–5 (3–0)	UD Arena (12,767); Dayton, OH
January 16, 2019; 8:00 pm, CBSSN		at VCU	L 71–76	11–6 (3–1)	Siegel Center (7,637); Richmond, VA
January 19, 2019; 4:30 pm, NBCSN		at St. Bonaventure	W 89–86 ^{2OT}	12–6 (4–1)	Reilly Center (3,918); Olean, NY
January 23, 2019; 7:00 pm		George Mason	L 63–67	12–7 (4–2)	UD Arena (12,895); Dayton, OH
January 26, 2019; 2:00 pm		at Fordham	W 75–52	13–7 (5–2)	Rose Hill Gymnasium (3,200); Bronx, NY
January 30, 2019; 8:00 pm, CBSSN		Saint Joseph's	W 75–64	14–7 (6–2)	UD Arena (12,628); Dayton, OH
February 2, 2019; 2:00 pm, FSOH		Duquesne	W 68–64	15–7 (7–2)	UD Arena (13,147); Dayton, OH
February 5, 2019; 9:00 pm, CBSSN		at Saint Louis	L 60–73	15–8 (7–3)	Chaifetz Arena (6,311); St. Louis, MO
February 9, 2019; 4:00 pm, CBSSN		at Rhode Island	W 77–48	16–8 (8–3)	Ryan Center; Kingston, RI
February 16, 2019; 4:00 pm, NBCSN		VCU	L 68–69	16–9 (8–4)	UD Arena (13,147); Dayton, OH
February 19, 2019; 6:00 pm, CBSSN		at Davidson	W 74–73	17–9 (9–4)	John M. Belk Arena; Davidson, NC
February 23, 2019; 4:00 pm, CBSSN		Saint Louis	W 70–62	18–9 (10–4)	UD Arena (13,137); Dayton, OH
February 26, 2019; 7:00 pm		at Massachusetts	W 72–48	19–9 (11–4)	Mullins Center (2,478); Amherst, MA
March 1, 2019; 7:00 pm, ESPN2		Rhode Island	L 70–72 ^{OT}	19–10 (11–5)	UD Arena (13,147); Dayton, OH
March 6, 2019; 7:00 pm		La Salle	W 70–39	20–10 (12–5)	UD Arena (13,147); Dayton, OH
March 9, 2019; 7:00 pm, ESPN+		at Duquesne	W 78–67	21–10 (13–5)	Palumbo Center (4,057); Pittsburgh, PA
Atlantic 10 tournament
March 15, 2019; 8:30 pm, NBCSN	(3)	vs. (6) Saint Louis; Quarterfinals	L 55–64	21–11	Barclays Center (6,857); Brooklyn, NY
NIT
March 19, 2019*; 11:00 pm, ESPN2	(5)	at (4) Colorado; First round – Alabama bracket	L 73–78	21–12	Coors Events Center (3,091); Boulder, CO
*Non-conference game. ^{#}Rankings from AP Poll. (#) Tournament seedings in parentheses. All times are in Eastern Time.
