= 2018–19 Duquesne Dukes men's basketball team =

American college basketball season

2018–19 Duquesne Dukes men's basketball
- Conference: Atlantic 10 Conference
- Record: 19–13 (10–8 A-10)
- Head coach: Keith Dambrot (2nd season)
- Assistant coaches: Rick McFadden; Terry Weigand; Charles Thomas; Carl Thomas
- Home arena: A. J. Palumbo Center (Capacity: 4,406)

2018–19 Atlantic 10 men's basketball standings
	Conf.				Overall
Team	W		L	PCT	W		L	PCT
VCU	16	–	2	.889	25	–	8	.758
Davidson	14	–	4	.778	24	–	10	.706
Dayton	13	–	5	.722	21	–	12	.636
St. Bonaventure	12	–	6	.667	18	–	16	.529
George Mason	11	–	7	.611	18	–	15	.545
Saint Louis †	10	–	8	.556	23	–	13	.639
Duquesne	10	–	8	.556	19	–	13	.594
Rhode Island	9	–	9	.500	18	–	15	.545
La Salle	8	–	10	.444	10	–	21	.323
Saint Joseph's	6	–	12	.333	14	–	19	.424
Richmond	6	–	12	.333	13	–	20	.394
George Washington	4	–	14	.222	9	–	24	.273
Massachusetts	4	–	14	.222	11	–	21	.344
Fordham	3	–	15	.167	12	–	20	.375
† 2019 Atlantic 10 tournament winner

The 2018–19 Duquesne Dukes men's basketball team represented Duquesne University during the 2018–19 NCAA Division I men's basketball season. The Dukes, led by second-year head coach Keith Dambrot, played their home games at the A. J. Palumbo Center in Pittsburgh, Pennsylvania as members of the Atlantic 10 Conference. They finished the season 19–13, 10–8 in A-10 Play to tie for 6th place. They lost in the first round of the A-10 tournament to Saint Joseph's.

== Previous season ==
The Dukes finished the 2017–18 season 16–16, 7–11 in A-10 play to finish in a three-way tie for 10th place. As the No. 10 seed in the A-10 tournament, they lost Richmond in the second round.

== Offseason ==
=== Departures ===
Name	Number	Pos.	Height	Weight	Year	Hometown	Reason for departure
Chas Brown	0	F/C	6'8"	235	RS Senior	Baltimore, MD	Graduated
Eric James	2	G	6'6"	215	Senior	Westerville, OH	Graduated
Tarin Smith	3	G	6'2"	185	RS Junior	Ocean Township, NJ	Graduate transferred to Connecticut
Rene Castro	4	G	6'2"	195	RS Senior	Boston, MA	Graduated
Marko Krivacevic	22	F	6'9"	215	Junior	Szombathely, Hungary	Graduate transferred to Indiana (PA)
Tydus Verhoeven	25	F	6'8"	215	Freshman	Manteca, CA	Transferred to UTEP
Nicholas Kratholm	34	F	6'8"	220	Freshman	Louisville, KY	Transferred to Miami Dade College
Jordan Robinson	55	C	6'8"	255	RS Senior	Toronto, ON	Graduated

=== 2018 recruiting class ===
College recruiting information
Name	Hometown	School	Height	Weight	Commit date
Gavin Bizeau #22 C	Plainfield, IN	Plainfield High School	6 ft 10 in (2.08 m)	181 lb (82 kg)	Aug 5, 2017
Gavin Bizeau #22 C	Recruit ratings: Scout: Rivals: (80)				
Austin Rotroff #49 C	Wauseon, OH	Wauseon High School	6 ft 9 in (2.06 m)	225 lb (102 kg)	
Austin Rotroff #49 C	Recruit ratings: Scout: Rivals: (75)				
Dylan Swingle #50 C	Bainbridge, OH	Paint Valley High School	6 ft 9 in (2.06 m)	275 lb (125 kg)	May 15, 2017
Dylan Swingle #50 C	Recruit ratings: Scout: Rivals: 247Sports: (NR)				
Brandon Wade; PG	Ann Arbor, MI	Skyline High School	6 ft 1 in (1.85 m)	175 lb (79 kg)	Oct 1, 2017
Brandon Wade; PG	Recruit ratings: Scout: Rivals: (NR)				
Amari Kelly; PF	Norcross, GA	Meadowcreek High School	6 ft 7 in (2.01 m)	250 lb (110 kg)	Oct 6, 2017
Amari Kelly; PF	Recruit ratings: Scout: Rivals: (NR)				
Sincere Carry; PG	Solon, OH	Solon High School	5 ft 11 in (1.80 m)	180 lb (82 kg)	
Sincere Carry; PG	Recruit ratings: Scout: Rivals: (NR)				
Lamar Norman; SG	Wyoming, MI	Godwin Heights High School	6 ft 2 in (1.88 m)	170 lb (77 kg)	
Lamar Norman; SG	Recruit ratings: Scout: Rivals: (NR)				
James Ellis; C	Pittsburgh, PA	Westinghouse High School	6 ft 11 in (2.11 m)	230 lb (100 kg)	
James Ellis; C	Recruit ratings: Scout: Rivals: (NR)				
Overall recruit ranking:
Note: In many cases, Scout, Rivals, 247Sports, On3, and ESPN may conflict in their listings of height and weight.; In these cases, the average was taken. ESPN grades are on a 100-point scale.; Sources: "2018 Team Ranking". Rivals.

== Roster ==
2018–19 Duquesne Dukes men's basketball team
Players
Coaches

Pos.	#	Name	Height	Weight	Year	Previous school	Hometown
G	0	Tavian Dunn-Martin	5 ft 8 in (1.73 m)	155 lb (70 kg)	RS So	Akron/Huntington HS	Huntington, WV
G	1	Mike Lewis II	6 ft 1 in (1.85 m)	185 lb (84 kg)	Jr	Chaminade	St. Louis, MO
G	2	Brandon Wade	6 ft 2 in (1.88 m)	185 lb (84 kg)	Fr	Skyline	Ann Arbor, MI
G	3	Frankie Hughes	6 ft 4 in (1.93 m)	195 lb (88 kg)	RS So	Missouri/Garfield Heights	Cleveland, OH
G	4	Craig Randall II	6 ft 4 in (1.93 m)	185 lb (84 kg)	RS Jr	Memphis/Shadow Mountain	Youngstown, OH
F	5	Marcus Weathers	6 ft 5 in (1.96 m)	225 lb (102 kg)	RS So	Miami (OH)/Shawnee Mission North	Overland Park, KS
F	14	Gavin Bizeau	6 ft 11 in (2.11 m)	230 lb (104 kg)	Fr	Plainfield	Plainfield, IN
F	20	Kellon Taylor (W)	6 ft 5 in (1.96 m)	220 lb (100 kg)	Jr	DeMatha Catholic	Landover, MD
C	21	Michael Hughes	6 ft 8 in (2.03 m)	250 lb (113 kg)	RS So	Akron/Liberty North	Liberty, MO
G	22	Lamar Norman Jr.	6 ft 3 in (1.91 m)	175 lb (79 kg)	Fr	Godwin Heights	Wyoming, MI
F	23	Amari Kelly	6 ft 9 in (2.06 m)	225 lb (102 kg)	Fr	Meadowcreek	Long Island, NY
C	25	Dylan Swingle	6 ft 11 in (2.11 m)	300 lb (136 kg)	Fr	Paint Valley	Chillicothe, OH
G	31	Caleb Davis (W)	6 ft 0 in (1.83 m)	175 lb (79 kg)	Jr	Valley	Pennsylvania, PA
F	32	Zach Snyder	6 ft 5 in (1.96 m)	210 lb (95 kg)	Sr	Seneca Valley	Cranberry Township, PA
F	34	Austin Rotroff	6 ft 10 in (2.08 m)	235 lb (107 kg)	Fr	Wauseon	Wauseon, OH
G	35	Sincere Carry	6 ft 1 in (1.85 m)	180 lb (82 kg)	Fr	Solon	Solon, OH
G	50	Eric Williams Jr.	6 ft 6 in (1.98 m)	205 lb (93 kg)	So	New Haven	New Haven, MI
C		James Ellis	6 ft 11 in (2.11 m)	230 lb (104 kg)	Fr	Westinghouse	Pittsburgh, PA

Head coach

- Keith Dambrot (Akron)

Assistant coach(es)

- Rick McFadden (Akron)
- Terry Weigand (Ashland)
- Charles Thomas (Eastern Michigan)
- Carl Thomas (Eastern Michigan)

Legend

- (C) Team captain
- (S) Suspended
- (I) Ineligible
- (W) Walk-on
- Injured
- Current redshirt

Roster

== Schedule and results ==
Date time, TV	Rank^{#}	Opponent^{#}	Result	Record	Site (attendance) city, state
Non-conference regular season
November 10, 2018*; 5:00 pm, ESPN+		William & Mary; Gotham Classic	W 84–70	1–0	Palumbo Center (2,534); Pittsburgh, PA
November 12, 2018*; 8:00 pm, ESPN+		UIC; Gotham Classic	W 89–88 ^{OT}	2–0	Palumbo Center (1,540); Pittsburgh, PA
November 17, 2018*; 12:00 pm		vs. Radford; Gotham Classic	W 69–64	3–0	St. Vincent–St. Mary HS (1,020); Akron, OH
November 20, 2018*; 7:00 pm, ACCN Extra		at Notre Dame; Gotham Classic	L 56–67	3–1	Edmund P. Joyce Center (6,161); South Bend, IN
November 25, 2018*; 1:00 pm, ESPN+		UMass Lowell	W 83–71	4–1	Palumbo Center (1,638); Pittsburgh, PA
November 30, 2018*; 7:00 pm, ACCN Extra		vs. Pittsburgh; City Game	L 53–74	4–2	PPG Paints Arena (12,246); Pittsburgh, PA
December 5, 2018*; 7:00 pm, ATTSNPT		Marshall	W 93–82	5–2	Palumbo Center (1,689); Pittsburgh, PA
December 9, 2018*; 1:00 pm, ESPN+		Longwood	W 80–71	6–2	Palumbo Center (1,565); Pittsburgh, PA
December 13, 2018*; 7:00 pm, ESPN+		Maryland Eastern Shore	W 72–57	7–2	Palumbo Center (1,346); Pittsburgh, PA
December 16, 2018*; 12:00 pm, ESPN+		Maine	W 72–46	8–2	Palumbo Center (1,487); Pittsburgh, PA
December 19, 2018*; 7:00 pm, CBSSN		vs. Penn State; PPG Paints Arena Showcase	L 67–73	8–3	PPG Paints Arena (2,537); Pittsburgh, PA
December 22, 2018*; 2:00 pm, ESPN+		Eastern Kentucky	W 85–84	9–3	Palumbo Center (1,421); Pittsburgh, PA
December 31, 2018*; 2:00 pm, ESPN+		NJIT	L 67–78	9–4	Palumbo Center (1,524); Pittsburgh, PA
Atlantic 10 regular season
January 5, 2019; 6:00 pm, NBCSN		at Davidson	L 61–65	9–5 (0–1)	John M. Belk Arena (4,558); Davidson, NC
January 9, 2019; 8:00 pm, ESPN+		Fordham	W 66–61	10–5 (1–1)	Palumbo Center (2,221); Pittsburgh, PA
January 12, 2019; 4:00 pm, ATTSNPT		Saint Joseph's	W 85–84	11–5 (2–1)	Palumbo Center (2,829); Pittsburgh, PA
January 16, 2019; 7:00 pm, ESPN+		at Richmond	W 74–68	12–5 (3–1)	Robins Center (4,603); Richmond, VA
January 20, 2019; 4:00 pm, NBCSN		at George Washington	W 91–85 ^{OT}	13–5 (4–1)	Charles E. Smith Center (2,601); Washington, D.C.
January 23, 2019; 8:00 pm, ATTSNPT		Saint Louis	W 77–73	14–5 (5–1)	Palumbo Center (3,011); Pittsburgh, PA
January 26, 2019; 2:00 pm, ATTSNPT		VCU	L 74–80	14–6 (5–2)	Palumbo Center (3,706); Pittsburgh, PA
January 30, 2019; 7:00 pm, ESPN+		Rhode Island	W 75–72	15–6 (6–2)	Palumbo Center (2,345); Pittsburgh, PA
February 2, 2019; 2:00 pm, ESPN+		at Dayton	L 64–68	15–7 (6–3)	UD Arena (13,147); Dayton, OH
February 6, 2019; 7:30 pm, Stadium		St. Bonaventure	L 49–51	15–8 (6–4)	Palumbo Center (2,433); Pittsburgh, PA
February 9, 2019; 2:00 pm, ESPN+		at Fordham	W 74–66	16–8 (7–4)	Rose Hill Gymnasium (1,477); Bronx, NY
February 13, 2019; 7:00 pm, ESPN+		at La Salle	L 72–73	16–9 (7–5)	Tom Gola Arena (1,247); Philadelphia, PA
February 16, 2019; 12:00 pm, NBCSN		George Washington	W 85–69	17–9 (8–5)	Palumbo Center (3,001); Pittsburgh, PA
February 23, 2019; 4:00 pm, ESPN+		at George Mason	W 79–78	18–9 (9–5)	EagleBank Arena (7,309); Fairfax, VA
February 27, 2019; 7:30 pm, ESPN+		at St. Bonaventure	L 47–68	18–10 (9–6)	Reilly Center (3,991); Olean, NY
March 2, 2019; 2:00 pm, ATTSNPT		Massachusetts	W 80–73	19–10 (10–6)	Palumbo Center (2,980); Pittsburgh, PA
March 6, 2019; 8:00 pm, ESPN+		at Saint Louis	L 75–85	19–11 (10–7)	Chaifetz Arena (6,711); St. Louis, MO
March 9, 2019; 7:00 pm, ATTSNPT		Dayton	L 67–78	19–12 (10–8)	Palumbo Center (4,057); Pittsburgh, PA
Atlantic 10 tournament
March 14, 2019; 6:00 pm, NBCSN	(7)	vs. (10) Saint Joseph's; Second Round	L 86–92	19–13	Barclays Center (5,968); Brooklyn, NY
*Non-conference game. ^{#}Rankings from AP Poll. (#) Tournament seedings in parentheses. All times are in Eastern Time.

== See also ==
- 2018–19 Duquesne Dukes women's basketball team
