= Darrius Garrett =

American basketball player

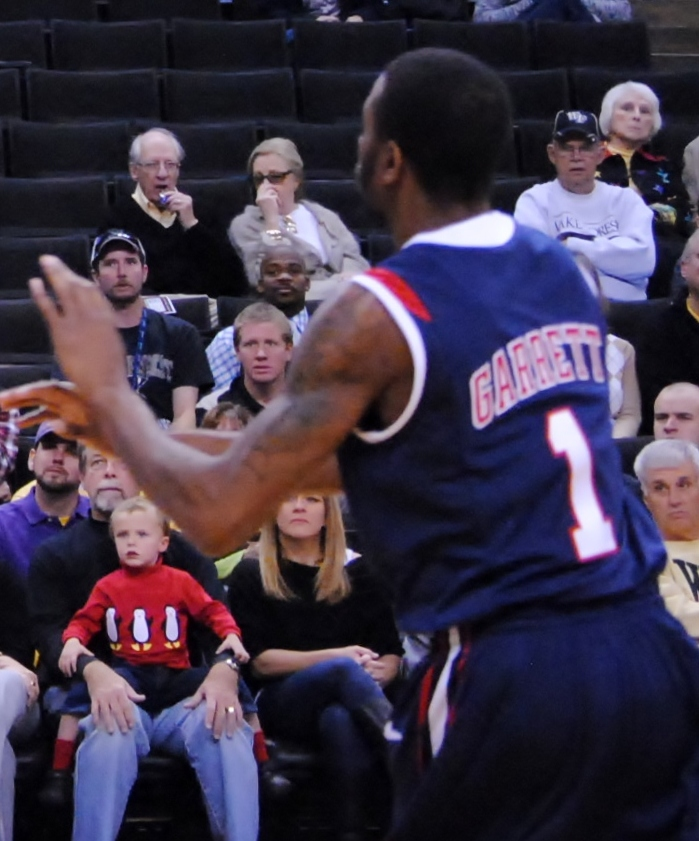
- Garrett playing for Richmond

Personal information
- Born: April 11, 1990 (age 36) Raleigh, North Carolina
- Listed height: 6 ft 9 in (2.06 m)
- Listed weight: 210 lb (95 kg)

Career information
- High school: McEachern (Powder Springs, Georgia)
- College: Richmond (2008–2012)
- NBA draft: 2012: undrafted
- Playing career: 2012–2020
- Position: Center / power forward

Career history
- 2012–2013: Fribourg Olympic
- 2013–2014: AENK
- 2014–2015: Koroivos Amaliadas
- 2015: Afyonkarahisar Belediyespor
- 2015: Stal Ostrów Wielkopolski
- 2016–2017: Hoops Club
- 2017: Marinos de Anzoátegui
- 2017: Club Malvín
- 2017–2018: Montevideo
- 2018: Beroe
- 2018–2019: PAOK
- 2019–2020: Iraklis

Career highlights
- Bulgarian League rebounding leader (2018); Greek League blocks leader (2014); Swiss League blocks leader (2013); Atlantic 10 All-Defensive team (2012)

Darrius Garrett (born April 11, 1990) is an American-Rwandan former professional basketball player. He played college basketball for the University of Richmond.

== High school career ==
Garret attended McEachern High School in Powder Springs, Georgia where he was a two-year starter and letterwinner for coach Nick Chaykowsky. As a senior in 2007–08, he averaged 16.2 points, 11.8 rebounds, 4.3 blocks and 2.0 steals per game.

== College career ==
As a freshman at Richmond in 2008–09, Garrett played sparingly for the Spiders, averaging 1.3 points and 1.9 rebounds in 12 games.

As a sophomore in 2009–10, Garrett played in all 35 games and finished seventh in the Atlantic 10 Conference in blocks per game with 1.7 (60 in total). He also averaged 2.3 points and 3.4 rebounds in 14.2 minutes per game. On January 13, 2010, in a game against Massachusetts, Garrett set both the Atlantic 10 and Richmond record for blocks in a single game with 14, which is tied for the second-most blocks in a game in NCAA Division I history.

As a junior in 2010–11, Garrett blocked a total of 59 shots, finishing the year seventh on Richmond's all-time blocks list with 124. In 37 games, he averaged 1.9 points, 4.1 rebounds and 1.6 blocks in 12.8 minutes per game.

As a senior in 2011–12, Garrett became a regular starter and a bigger part of the team, as well as finishing his career as Richmond's all-time leading shot blocker with a total of 231. Along with this honor, he was also named to the Atlantic 10 All-Defensive Team. In 32 games, he averaged 4.5 points, 6.5 rebounds, 1.0 assists and 3.3 blocks in 25.5 minutes per game.

== Professional career ==
In August 2012, Garrett signed with Fribourg Olympic of Switzerland for the 2012–13 season. In 32 games for Fribourg, he averaged 7.8 points, 8.1 rebounds and 2.5 blocks per game.

In August 2013, Garrett signed with AENK of Greece for the 2013–14 season. In April 2014, he left Nea Kifisia after appearing in 23 games. Over that time, he averaged 6.3 points, 5.2 rebounds and 1.8 blocks per game.

On July 27, 2014, Garrett signed a one-year deal with Vanoli Cremona of the Italian Serie A. On August 28, 2014, his contract was voided by Cremona following medical tests revealing a left knee injury. The following month, he signed with Koroivos Amaliadas. In January 2015, he left Koroivos and signed with Afyonkarahisar Belediyespor of Turkey for the rest of the 2014–15 season. He appeared in 11 games for Koroivos and averaged 10.0 points, 5.9 rebounds and 2.0 blocks, while also appearing in 10 games for Afyonkarahisar and averaging 12.5 points, 9.4 rebounds, 1.2 assists and 2.8 blocks per game.

On September 8, 2015, Garrett signed with Stal Ostrów Wielkopolski of Poland for the 2015–16 season. However, his stint lasted just four games after he suffered a serious Achilles tendon injury on October 28, 2015 in a game against AZS Koszalin.

In September 2016, Garrett signed with Hoops Club of the Lebanese Basketball League. On February 17, 2017, Garrett signed with the Venezuelan team Marinos de Anzoátegui.

In September 2017, Garrett signed with Uruguayan club Club Malvín.

On September 3, 2018, Garrett signed with PAOK of the Greek league.

On August 29, 2019, Garrett was signed by Thessaloniki local rivals Iraklis. On February 26, 2020, Garrett was released from the Greek club.

=== The Basketball Tournament (TBT) (2017–present) ===
In the summer of 2017, Garrett played in The Basketball Tournament on ESPN for the Broad Street Brawlers. He competed for the $2 million prize, and helped the Brawlers reach the second round of the tournament, falling to Team Colorado 111–95.

== National team career ==
Garrett played 3 games for the Rwanda national basketball team at the 2019 FIBA Basketball World Cup qualification where he averaged 11.7 points, 9.3 rebounds and 2.3 assists per game.

== Personal life ==
Garrett is the son of Darrick Jones and Sharllene Garrett, and has a younger sister, Dayira, and a younger brother, Darrick Jr.

== See also ==
- List of NCAA Division I men's basketball players with 13 or more blocks in a game
