= 1991 CAA men's basketball tournament =

- Classification: Division I
- Season: 1990–91
- Teams: 8
- Site: Richmond Coliseum; Richmond, VA
- Champions: Richmond (4th title)
- Winning coach: Dick Tarrant (4th title)
- MVP: Jim Shields (Richmond)

1990–91 CAA men's basketball standings
	Conf.				Overall
Team	W		L	PCT	W		L	PCT
James Madison	12	–	2	.857	19	–	10	.655
Richmond †	10	–	4	.714	22	–	10	.688
American	8	–	6	.571	15	–	14	.517
George Mason	8	–	6	.571	14	–	16	.467
UNC Wilmington	6	–	8	.429	11	–	17	.393
William & Mary	6	–	8	.429	13	–	15	.464
East Carolina	4	–	10	.286	12	–	16	.429
Navy	2	–	12	.143	8	–	21	.276
† 1991 CAA tournament winner Rankings from AP Poll

The 1991 Colonial Athletic Association men's basketball tournament was held March 2–4 at the Richmond Coliseum in Richmond, Virginia.

Richmond defeated fourth-seeded George Mason in the championship game, 81–78, to win their fourth (and second consecutive) CAA men's basketball tournament. The Spiders, therefore, earned an automatic bid to the 1991 NCAA tournament, where they advanced to the Second Round after upsetting Syracuse.

== Bracket ==
Quarterfinals; Saturday, March 2
1	James Madison	82
8	Navy	85
5	UNC Wilmington	73
4	George Mason	87
3	American	70
6	William & Mary	57
7	East Carolina	62
2	Richmond	86

Semifinals; Sunday, March 3
8	Navy	86
4	George Mason	93
3	American	70
2	Richmond	78

Championship; Monday, March 4
4	George Mason	78
2	Richmond	81
