= Bob McCurdy =

American basketball player (1952–2020)

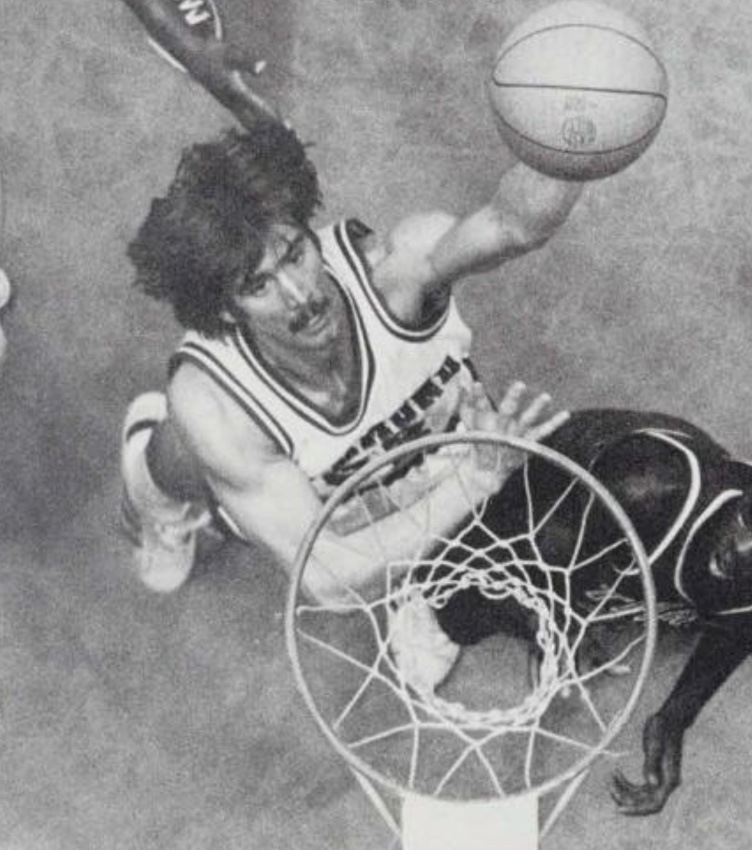
- McCurdy during his senior year at Richmond

Personal information
- Born: February 26, 1952 Deer Park, New York, U.S.
- Died: July 29, 2020 (aged 68) Connecticut, U.S.
- Listed height: 6 ft 7 in (2.01 m)
- Listed weight: 200 lb (91 kg)

Career information
- High school: Deer Park (Long Island, New York)
- College: Virginia (1971–1972); Richmond (1973–1975)
- NBA draft: 1975: 8th round, 132nd overall pick
- Drafted by: Milwaukee Bucks
- Position: Forward

Career highlights
- Third-team All-American – AP (1975); NCAA scoring champion (1975); First-team All-SoCon (1975); Second-team All-SoCon (1974)
- Stats at Basketball Reference

Robert McCurdy (February 26, 1952 – July 29, 2020) was an American college basketball player for the Richmond Spiders from 1973 to 1975. He began his collegiate career with the Virginia Cavaliers before transferring to Richmond. McCurdy was the nation's leading scorer during his senior season of 1974–75, averaging 32.9 points per game for the Spiders. He became a radio sales and management executive after college.

== Basketball career ==
=== College ===
==== Virginia ====
A native of Deer Park, New York, McCurdy attended Deer Park High School and graduated in 1970. He enrolled at the University of Virginia on a basketball scholarship, but in 1970–71 college freshmen were ineligible to play varsity basketball, so McCurdy had to play on Virginia's freshman team. He led the team in scoring that season, including a season-high 40 points against Maryland's duo of Tom McMillen and Len Elmore. McCurdy then played for one varsity season with the Cavaliers, but Bill Gibson, the coach who had recruited him, left the school. McCurdy decided to transfer and chose the University of Richmond.

==== Richmond ====
Due to NCAA transfer eligibility rules, McCurdy was forced to sit out for one full year before suiting up for Richmond. In his junior season in 1973–74, he averaged approximately 24 points per game. McCurdy was the Spiders' second leading scorer behind Aron Stewart, who averaged 26.5 points per game, and was named to the All-Southern Conference Second Team. The following year, the last of his collegiate career, he increased his scoring average to 32.9 per game and led all of Division I in scoring. He scored a total of 855 points that season, and on February 26 (his birthday) he had a career high 53-point outing against Appalachian State. Both the single season and game totals are still school records. Averaging 22.8 field goal attempts per game, the 6-foot-7-inch (2.01 m), 200-pound (91 kg) forward took 35 percent of the team's shots while rarely passing; he was credited with only 11 assists for the season. McCurdy was a first-team All-Southern Conference selection, and the Associated Press named him a third-team All-America. In just two seasons at Richmond, he scored 1,347 points.

Kevin Eastman, the starting point guard, was in awe at McCurdy's ability to score. Many years later, Eastman was quoted as saying, "Looking back now, it was a remarkable feat. [McCurdy] had virtually no quickness. He didn't really have dribbling skills. He couldn't jump that high. He couldn't run real fast. He was a prime example of how will and enthusiasm and effort allowed him to rise to another level." Jokingly, Eastman added, "He worked harder than anybody else on the team, but he was very focused on one skill, and that was shooting. I'm not sure I saw him in a defensive stance all year, and the one or two assists that he got were mistakes."

=== NBA ===
McCurdy was selected in the eighth round (132nd overall) in the 1975 NBA draft by the Milwaukee Bucks. He never played a game in the league, however, and it is speculated that the constant cortisone injections into his foot during his senior year may have scared off teams from giving him a chance.

== Business career ==
With professional basketball out of the picture, McCurdy focused on becoming a successful businessman. Later in life, after admitting to skipping classes while in college to work on his jump shot, he said, "I was almost incoherent when I got out of college. Here I was, hoping to be a businessman, and I couldn't even talk basketball." He hired a tutor to catch him back up to speed in statistics. Within a few years he was a successful employee at Katz Radio, becoming the company president in 1990. After Clear Channel purchased Katz Media Group, McCurdy became regional president for Clear Channel Radio Sales. He was named president of the Katz Radio's business division, Katz Marketing Solutions, in 2009. He later joined Beasley Media Group before retiring in April 2020.

== Personal life ==
McCurdy resided in Westport, Connecticut, with his wife Cindy. They had four children together, including a son, Sean, who was also a successful basketball player. Sean played at St. Anthony High School for Hall of Fame coach Bob Hurley. Sean was a starter for the undefeated and national champion St. Anthony Friars in 2003–04. He accepted a scholarship to play basketball at Arkansas, but after two seasons transferred to William & Mary to finish his collegiate basketball career.

McCurdy was diagnosed with anal cancer in 2018. He filed a medical malpractice case against the Whittingham Cancer Center at Norwalk Hospital. in Norwalk, Connecticut. The suit argued that he was given improper chemotherapy treatment, receiving only 25 percent of the supposed dosage he should have been given of the drugs Fluorouracil and Mitomycin. With his age and compromised immune system, McCurdy became homebound in 2020 during the COVID-19 pandemic. He died at age 68 on July 29, 2020, in Connecticut.
