= 1988 CAA men's basketball tournament =

- Classification: Division I
- Season: 1987–88
- Teams: 8
- Site: Hampton Coliseum; Hampton, VA
- Champions: Richmond (2nd title)
- Winning coach: Dick Tarrant (2nd title)
- MVP: Peter Wollfolk (Richmond)

1987–88 CAA men's basketball standings
	Conf.				Overall
Team	W		L	PCT	W		L	PCT
Richmond †	11	–	3	.786	26	–	7	.788
American	9	–	5	.643	14	–	14	.500
George Mason	9	–	5	.643	20	–	10	.667
UNC-Wilmington	8	–	6	.571	15	–	14	.517
Navy	6	–	8	.429	12	–	16	.429
James Madison	5	–	9	.357	10	–	18	.357
William & Mary	5	–	9	.357	10	–	19	.345
East Carolina	3	–	11	.214	8	–	20	.286
† 1988 CAA tournament winner Rankings from AP Poll

The 1988 Colonial Athletic Association men's basketball tournament was held March 5–7 at the Hampton Coliseum in Hampton, Virginia.

Richmond defeated George Mason in the championship game, 74–71, to win their second CAA/ECAC South men's basketball tournament. The Spiders, therefore, earned an automatic bid to the 1988 NCAA tournament, where they advanced to the program's first Sweet Sixteen.

== Bracket ==
Quarterfinals; Saturday, March 5
1	Richmond	67
8	East Carolina	41
5	Navy	55
4	UNC Wilmington	70
3	George Mason	61
6	James Madison	57
7	William & Mary	76
2	American	75

Semifinals; Sunday, March 6
1	Richmond	54
4	UNC Wilmington	53
3	George Mason	95
7	William & Mary	76

Championship; Monday, March 7
1	Richmond	74
3	George Mason	71
