= 1990–91 Richmond Spiders men's basketball team =

American college basketball season

1990–91 Richmond Spiders men's basketball

CAA tournament champions

NCAA tournament, Round of 32
- Conference: Colonial Athletic Association
- Record: 22–10 (10–4 CAA)
- Head coach: Dick Tarrant (10th season)
- Assistant coach: Benjy Taylor
- Captain: Terry Connolly
- Home arena: Robins Center

1990–91 CAA men's basketball standings
	Conf.				Overall
Team	W		L	PCT	W		L	PCT
James Madison	12	–	2	.857	19	–	10	.655
Richmond †	10	–	4	.714	22	–	10	.688
American	8	–	6	.571	15	–	14	.517
George Mason	8	–	6	.571	14	–	16	.467
UNC Wilmington	6	–	8	.429	11	–	17	.393
William & Mary	6	–	8	.429	13	–	15	.464
East Carolina	4	–	10	.286	12	–	16	.429
Navy	2	–	12	.143	8	–	21	.276
† 1991 CAA tournament winner Rankings from AP Poll

The 1990–91 Richmond Spiders men's basketball team represented the University of Richmond in National Collegiate Athletic Association (NCAA) Division I college basketball during the 1990–91 season. Richmond competed as a member of the Colonial Athletic Association (CAA) under head basketball coach Dick Tarrant and played its home games at the Robins Center.

Richmond finished second in the CAA regular-season standings with a 10–4 conference record, and won the CAA tournament to earn an automatic bid to the 1991 NCAA tournament. In the opening round, the Spiders became the first #15 seed to win an NCAA Tournament game. They defeated the seventh-ranked, #2 seed Syracuse Orangemen, 73–69, at Cole Field House in College Park, Maryland. Richmond lost in the second round to Temple, 77–64, to finish with a 22–10 record.

== Roster ==
1990–91 Richmond Spiders men's basketball team
Players
Coaches

Pos.	#	Name	Height	Weight	Year	Previous school	Hometown
G	24	Curtis Blair	6 ft 3 in (1.91 m)	—	Jr	Patrick Henry	Roanoke, Virginia
F	44	Kenny Wood	6 ft 6 in (1.98 m)	—	So
C		Jim Shields	6 ft 10 in (2.08 m)	—	Jr
F	55	Terry Connolly (C)	6 ft 5 in (1.96 m)	—	Sr
F		Chris Fleming	6 ft 5 in (1.96 m)	—	So	Lacey Township
F		Tim Weathers	6 ft 6 in (1.98 m)	—	So
C		Jim Springer	6 ft 8 in (2.03 m)	—	So	Huron High School	Huron, OH
G	12	Gerald Jarmon	6 ft 1 in (1.85 m)	—	Fr	New Bern
G		Eugene Burroughs	6 ft 2 in (1.88 m)	—	Fr	Episcopal Academy
F	45	Michael Hodges	6 ft 6 in (1.98 m)	—	Fr
G		Ty Evans	6 ft 4 in (1.93 m)	—	Fr
C		Eric Johnson	6 ft 8 in (2.03 m)	—	So
G		Brian Muldowney	5 ft 11 in (1.8 m)	—	So

Head coach

- Dick Tarrant

Assistant coach(es)

Legend

- (C) Team captain
- (S) Suspended
- (I) Ineligible
- (W) Walk-on
- Injured
- Current redshirt

== Schedule and results ==
Date time, TV	Rank^{#}	Opponent^{#}	Result	Record	Site city, state
Regular season
Nov 23, 1990*		Dartmouth; Central Fidelity Holiday Classic	W 65–54	1–0	Robins Center; Richmond, Virginia
Nov 24, 1990*		No. 21 Georgia; Central Fidelity Holiday Classic	L 45–90	1–1	Robins Center; Richmond, Virginia
Dec 1, 1990*		No. 14 Georgia Tech	W 73–71	2–1	Robins Center; Richmond, Virginia
Dec 5, 1990*		VCU	W 67–63	3–1	Robins Center; Richmond, Virginia
Dec 9, 1990*		at Fairfield	W 68–60	4–1	Alumni Hall; Fairfield, Connecticut
Dec 11, 1990*		at Army	W 82–56	5–1	Christl Arena; West Point, New York
Dec 22, 1990*		at Wake Forest	L 56–82	5–2	Lawrence Joel Coliseum; Winston-Salem, North Carolina
Dec 28, 1990*		vs. Virginia Tech; Times-Dispatch Tournament	L 79–82	5–3	Richmond Coliseum; Richmond, Virginia
Dec 29, 1990*		at VCU; Times-Dispatch Tournament	L 66–72	5–4	Richmond Coliseum; Richmond, Virginia
Jan 3, 1991*		at Old Dominion	W 74–65	6–4	ODU Fieldhouse; Norfolk, Virginia
Jan 7, 1991		George Mason	L 69–77	6–5 (0–1)	Robins Center; Richmond, Virginia
Jan 9, 1991		at James Madison	L 61–72	6–6 (0–2)	JMU Convocation Center; Harrisonburg, Virginia
Jan 12, 1991		American	L 65–75	6–7 (0–3)	Robins Center; Richmond, Virginia
Jan 14, 1991*		College of Charleston	W 85–54	7–7	Robins Center; Richmond, Virginia
Jan 16, 1991		at Navy	W 83–82	8–7 (1–3)	Halsey Field House; Annapolis, Maryland
Jan 19, 1991		UNC Wilmington	W 74–57	9–7 (2–3)	Robins Center; Richmond, Virginia
Jan 21, 1991*		at VMI	L 75–80	9–8	Cameron Hall; Lexington, Virginia
Jan 23, 1991		at East Carolina	W 71–64	10–8 (3–3)	Williams Arena at Minges Coliseum; Greenville, North Carolina
Jan 26, 1991		William & Mary	W 80–63	11–8 (4–3)	Robins Center; Richmond, Virginia
Feb 2, 1991		at George Mason	W 75–62	12–8 (5–3)	Patriot Center; Fairfax, Virginia
Feb 4, 1991*		at Virginia Tech	W 61–56	13–8	Cassell Coliseum; Blacksburg, Virginia
Feb 6, 1991		James Madison	W 67–50	14–8 (6–3)	Robins Center; Richmond, Virginia
Feb 9, 1991		at American	W 79–59	15–8 (7–3)	Bender Arena; Washington, D.C.
Feb 13, 1991		Navy	W 91–72	16–8 (8–3)	Robins Center; Richmond, Virginia
Feb 9, 1991		at UNC Wilmington	W 81–64	17–8 (9–3)	Trask Coliseum; Wilmington, North Carolina
Feb 20, 1991		East Carolina	W 65–50	18–8 (10–3)	Robins Center; Richmond, Virginia
Feb 23, 1991		at William & Mary	L 69–71	18–9 (10–4)	Kaplan Arena; Williamsburg, Virginia
CAA Tournament
Mar 2, 1991*	(2)	vs. (7) East Carolina; Quarterfinal	W 86–62	19–9	Richmond Coliseum; Richmond, Virginia
Mar 3, 1991*	(2)	vs. (3) American; Semifinal	W 78–70	20–9	Richmond Coliseum; Richmond, Virginia
Mar 4, 1991*	(2)	vs. (4) George Mason; Championship	W 81–78	21–9	Richmond Coliseum; Richmond, Virginia
NCAA Tournament
Mar 14, 1991*	(15 E)	vs. (2 E) No. 7 Syracuse; First Round	W 73–69	22–9	Cole Field House; College Park, Maryland
Mar 16, 1991*	(15 E)	vs. (10 E) Temple; Second Round	L 64–77	22–10	Cole Field House; College Park, Maryland
*Non-conference game. ^{#}Rankings from AP poll. (#) Tournament seedings in parentheses. E=East. All times are in Eastern.
