= Malcolm Pitt =

American football, basketball and baseball coach and college athletics administrator

Biographical details
- Born: January 10, 1897; Richmond, Virginia, U.S.
- Died: September 16, 1985 (aged 88); Richmond, Virginia, U.S.
- Education: University of Richmond

Coaching career (HC unless noted)

Football
- 1943–1944: Richmond

Basketball
- 1933–1952: Richmond

Baseball
- 1935–1971: Richmond

Administrative career (AD unless noted)
- 1942–1967: Richmond

Head coaching record
- Overall: 8–7 (football); 197–169 (basketball); 426–257–5 (baseball)

Malcolm Upshur "Mac" Pitt (January 10, 1897 – September 16, 1985) was an American football, basketball, and baseball coach and college athletics administrator. At the University of Richmond he served as the head men's basketball coach from 1933 to 1952, the head baseball coach from 1935 to 1971, and the athletic director from 1942 to 1967. Pitt was also the head football coach for two seasons, from 1943 to 1944. Pitt's 1934–35 basketball squad finished a perfect 20–0, the only unbeaten Spider basketball team in history. As a student at Richmond from 1915 to 1918, Pitt played football and baseball and ran on the track team.

== Honors and death ==
Pitt was elected to the American Baseball Coaches Association Hall of Fame in 1971 and the Virginia Sports Hall of Fame in 1974. Malcolm U. Pitt Field, the baseball stadium at Richmond, is named in Pitt's honor. He died after a brief illness on September 16, 1985, at a Richmond hospital. He was buried in Hollywood Cemetery.

== Head coaching record ==
=== Football ===
| Year | Team | Overall | Conference | Standing | Bowl/playoffs |
|---|---|---|---|---|---|
Richmond Spiders (Southern Conference) (1943–1944)
| 1943 | Richmond | 6–1 | 1–1 | T–5th | |
| 1944 | Richmond | 2–6 | 0–4 | 10th | |
| Richmond: | | 8–7 | 1–5 | | |
| Total: | | 8–7 | | | |

=== Basketball ===
Record table
| Season | Team | Overall | Conference | Standing | Postseason |
|---|---|---|---|---|---|
Richmond Spiders (Virginia Conference) (1933–1934)
| 1933–34 | Richmond | 10–5 | 4–4 | | |
Richmond Spiders (Independent) (1934–1936)
| 1934–35 | Richmond | 20–0 | | | |
| 1935–36 | Richmond | 14–6 | | | |
Richmond Spiders (Southern Conference) (1936–1953)
| 1936–37 | Richmond | 13–7 | 5–4 | 7th | |
| 1937–38 | Richmond | 15–5 | 7–4 | 6th | |
| 1938–39 | Richmond | 10–10 | 5–5 | T–8th | |
| 1939–40 | Richmond | 11–6 | 5–4 | 7th | |
| 1940–41 | Richmond | 11–10 | 7–5 | 7th | |
| 1941–42 | Richmond | 9–10 | 4–8 | T–11th | |
| 1942–43 | Richmond | 11–5 | 4–4 | T–9th | |
| 1943–44 | Richmond | 7–6 | 2–2 | 5th | |
| 1944–45 | Richmond | 3–4 | 2–0 | 1st | |
| 1945–46 | Richmond | 8–12 | 3–7 | 13th | |
| 1946–47 | Richmond | 17–9 | 8–5 | 6th | |
| 1947–48 | Richmond | 8–14 | 4–9 | 13th | |
| 1948–49 | Richmond | 8–15 | 5–10 | 13th | |
| 1949–50 | Richmond | 8–16 | 4–13 | 14th | |
| 1950–51 | Richmond | 7–14 | 5–10 | 12th | |
| 1951–52 | Richmond | 7–15 | 3–11 | T–13th | |
| Richmond: | | 197–169 | 77–105 | | |
| Total: | | 197–169 | | | |
