= Bill Dooley (basketball) =

American basketball player and coach

Biographical details
- Born: April 1, 1960 (age 66)

Playing career
- 1982–1983: Richmond

Coaching career (HC unless noted)
- 1985–1987: Richmond (GA)
- 1987–1992: Richmond (assistant)
- 1993–1997: Richmond
- 1998–2000: Delaware Valley
- 2000–2002: Irish national team
- 2002–2003: Delaware Valley
- 2007–2012: Chestnut Hill Academy
- 2012–2015: Hartford (assistant)
- 2015–2016: Virginia Tech (women's assistant)

Accomplishments and honors

Awards
- CAA Coach of the Year (1994)

Bill Dooley (born April 1, 1960) was the head men's basketball coach at the University of Richmond from 1993 through 1997. Prior to taking the helm of the Spiders basketball program, he served as assistant coach at Richmond for eight years under Dick Tarrant. Dooley began his collegiate playing career at Catholic University before transferring to the University of Richmond, where he served as team captain for the 1982–83 season. After leaving the University of Richmond, Dooley served as varsity boys' basketball coach at Chestnut Hill Academy in Philadelphia, assistant men's basketball coach at the University of Hartford for the 2012-2015 seasons, assistant women's basketball coach at Virginia Tech for the 2015-2016 season, and advanced scout for the New Jersey Nets for the 2016-2020 seasons.

After leaving Richmond, Dooley became head coach at Delaware Valley College in 1998. After going 17–31, Dooley left to become head coach for Ireland's national team. Following this run, Dooley returned to Delaware Valley in 2002 but left midseason the following year.

In 2004, Dooley was hired as an assistant at La Salle by Billy Hahn. However, just three weeks after being hired the school was rocked by a rape scandal involving several players. Dooley was named interim coach while Hahn was placed on administrative leave and ultimately dismissed. Dooley was not retained as an assistant by new head coach John Giannini.

On August 10, 2012, Dooley was announced as an assistant for coach John Gallagher at Hartford.

On September 11, 2015, Dooley was announced as an assistant with the Virginia Tech Hokies women's basketball team under coach Dennis Wolff.

== Head coaching record ==
Record table
Season	Team	Overall	Conference	Standing	Postseason
Richmond (Colonial Athletic Association) (1993–1997)
1993–94	Richmond	14–14	8–6	4th	
1994–95	Richmond	8–20	3–11	7th	
1995–96	Richmond	8–20	3–13	9th	
1996–97	Richmond	13–15	7–9	8th	
Richmond:		43–69	21–39		
Total:		43–69			
National champion Postseason invitational champion Conference regular season champion Conference regular season and conference tournament champion Division regular season champion Division regular season and conference tournament champion Conference tournament champion
