= 1987–88 Richmond Spiders men's basketball team =

American college basketball season

1987–88 Richmond Spiders men's basketball

CAA regular season champion CAA tournament champion

NCAA tournament, Sweet Sixteen
- Conference: Colonial Athletic Association
- Record: 26–7 (11–3 CAA)
- Head coach: Dick Tarrant (7th season)
- Captains: Steve Kratzer; Rodney Rice; Peter Woolfolk
- Home arena: Robins Center

1987–88 CAA men's basketball standings
| | Conf. | | | | Overall |
| Team | W | | L | PCT | W | | L | PCT |
|---|---|---|---|---|---|---|---|---|
| Richmond † | 11 | – | 3 | .786 | 26 | – | 7 | .788 |
| American | 9 | – | 5 | .643 | 14 | – | 14 | .500 |
| George Mason | 9 | – | 5 | .643 | 20 | – | 10 | .667 |
| UNC-Wilmington | 8 | – | 6 | .571 | 15 | – | 14 | .517 |
| Navy | 6 | – | 8 | .429 | 12 | – | 16 | .429 |
| James Madison | 5 | – | 9 | .357 | 10 | – | 18 | .357 |
| William & Mary | 5 | – | 9 | .357 | 10 | – | 19 | .345 |
| East Carolina | 3 | – | 11 | .214 | 8 | – | 20 | .286 |
† 1988 CAA tournament winner Rankings from AP Poll

The 1987–88 Richmond Spiders men's basketball team represented the University of Richmond in National Collegiate Athletic Association (NCAA) Division I college basketball during the 1987–88 season. Richmond competed as a member of the Colonial Athletic Association (CAA) under head basketball coach Dick Tarrant and played its home games at the Robins Center.

Richmond finished first in the CAA regular-season standings with an 11–3 conference record, and won the CAA tournament to earn an automatic bid to the 1988 NCAA tournament. In the opening round, the Spiders defeated Indiana, 72–69, and followed that with a 59–55 win over Georgia Tech to reach the Sweet Sixteen. Richmond lost to #1 ranked Temple, 69–47, in the East regional semifinals.

== Roster ==
1987–88 Richmond Spiders men's basketball team
Players
Coaches

| Pos. | # | Name | Height | Weight | Year | Previous school | Hometown |
|---|---|---|---|---|---|---|---|
| G | 10 | Ken Atkinson | 6 ft 1 in (1.85 m) | 175 lb (79 kg) | So | St. Anthony's |
| G | 24 | Curtis Blair | 6 ft 3 in (1.91 m) | — | Fr | Patrick Henry | Roanoke, Virginia |
| C | | Jim Shields | 6 ft 10 in (2.08 m) | — | Fr |

Head coach

- Dick Tarrant

Assistant coach(es)

Legend

- (C) Team captain
- (S) Suspended
- (I) Ineligible
- (W) Walk-on
- Injured
- Current redshirt

== Schedule and results ==
| Date time, TV | Rank^{#} | Opponent^{#} | Result | Record | Site city, state |
Regular season
| Nov 27, 1987* | | Boston University; Central Fidelity Holiday Classic | W 66–61 | 1–0 | Robins Center; Richmond, Virginia |
| Nov 28, 1987* | | No. 3 North Carolina; Central Fidelity Holiday Classic | L 76–87 | 1–1 | Robins Center; Richmond, Virginia |
| Dec 4, 1987* | | vs. Tulsa; Kactus Classic | W 64–60 | 2–1 | Wells Fargo Arena; Tempe, Arizona |
| Dec 5, 1987* | | at Arizona State; Kactus Classic | W 76–63 | 3–1 | Wells Fargo Arena; Tempe, Arizona |
| Dec 9, 1987* | | Radford | W 67–53 | 4–1 | Robins Center; Richmond, Virginia |
| Dec 18, 1987* | | at VCU; Times-Dispatch Tournament | W 60–58 | 5–1 | Richmond Coliseum; Richmond, Virginia |
| Dec 19, 1987* | | vs. Old Dominion; Times-Dispatch Tournament | W 70–63 | 6–1 | Richmond Coliseum; Richmond, Virginia |
| Dec 22, 1987* | | at Georgia Tech | W 73–67 | 7–1 | Alexander Memorial Coliseum; Atlanta, Georgia |
| Jan 4, 1988* | | at VCU | L 53–72 | 7–2 | Richmond Coliseum; Richmond, Virginia |
| Jan 6, 1988* | | VMI | W 88–55 | 8–2 | Robins Center; Richmond, Virginia |
| Jan 9, 1988* | | Navy | W 78–63 | 9–2 (1–0) | Robins Center; Richmond, Virginia |
| Jan 11, 1988* | | La Salle | W 82–81 | 10–2 | Robins Center; Richmond, Virginia |
| Jan 13, 1988 | | at American | W 78–65 | 11–2 (2–0) | Fort Myer Ceremonial Hall; Washington, D.C. |
| Jan 16, 1988 | | George Mason | W 86–70 | 12–2 (3–0) | Robins Center; Richmond, Virginia |
| Jan 20, 1988 | | at James Madison | L 54–58 | 12–3 (3–1) | JMU Convocation Center; Harrisonburg, Virginia |
| Jan 23, 1988 | | East Carolina | W 84–79 | 13–3 (4–1) | Robins Center; Richmond, Virginia |
| Jan 27, 1988 | | UNC Wilmington | W 73–66 | 14–3 (5–1) | Robins Center; Richmond, Virginia |
| Jan 30, 1988 | | at William & Mary | W 77–69 | 15–3 (6–1) | Kaplan Arena; Williamsburg, Virginia |
| Feb 2, 1988* | | Old Dominion | W 82–75 | 16–3 | Robins Center; Richmond, Virginia |
| Feb 6, 1988 | | at Navy | L 59–73 | 16–4 (6–2) | Halsey Field House; Annapolis, Maryland |
| Feb 10, 1988 | | American | L 63–68 | 16–5 (6–3) | Robins Center; Richmond, Virginia |
| Feb 13, 1988 | | at George Mason | W 62–60 | 17–5 (7–3) | Patriot Center; Fairfax, Virginia |
| Feb 15, 1988* | | at Virginia Tech | L 74–87 | 17–6 | Cassell Coliseum; Blacksburg, Virginia |
| Feb 17, 1988 | | James Madison | W 69–55 | 18–6 (8–3) | Robins Center; Richmond, Virginia |
| Feb 20, 1988 | | at East Carolina | W 68–64 | 19–6 (9–3) | Williams Arena at Minges Coliseum; Greenville, North Carolina |
| Feb 24, 1988 | | at UNC Wilmington | W 61–60 | 20–6 (10–3) | Trask Coliseum; Wilmington, North Carolina |
| Feb 27, 1988 | | William & Mary | W 73–65 | 21–6 (11–3) | Robins Center; Richmond, Virginia |
CAA Tournament
| Mar 5, 1988* | (1) | vs. (8) East Carolina; Quarterfinals | W 67–41 | 22–6 | Hampton Coliseum; Hampton, Virginia |
| Mar 6, 1988* | (1) | vs. (4) UNC Wilmington; Semifinals | W 54–53 | 23–6 | Hampton Coliseum; Hampton, Virginia |
| Mar 7, 1988* | (1) | vs. (3) George Mason; Championship | W 74–71 | 24–6 | Hampton Coliseum; Hampton, Virginia |
NCAA Tournament
| Mar 18, 1988* | (13 E) | vs. (4 E) Indiana; First round | W 72–69 | 25–6 | Hartford Civic Center; Hartford, Connecticut |
| Mar 20, 1988* | (13 E) | vs. (5 E) Georgia Tech; Second Round | W 59–55 | 26–6 | Hartford Civic Center; Hartford, Connecticut |
| Mar 24, 1988* | (13 E) | vs. (1 E) No. 1 Temple; East Regional semifinal – Sweet Sixteen | L 47–69 | 26–7 | Brendan Byrne Arena; East Rutherford, New Jersey |
*Non-conference game. ^{#}Rankings from AP poll. (#) Tournament seedings in parentheses. E=East. All times are in Eastern.
