= Chris Mooney (basketball) =

American basketball coach (born 1972)

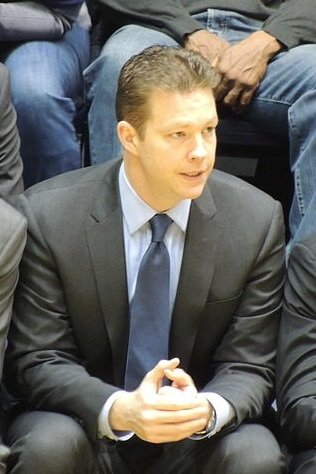
- Mooney coaching in 2013

Current position
- Title: Head coach
- Team: Richmond
- Conference: Atlantic 10
- Record: 376–310 (.548)

Biographical details
- Born: August 7, 1972 (age 54); Philadelphia, Pennsylvania, U.S.

Playing career
- 1990–1994: Princeton

Coaching career (HC unless noted)
- 1994–1998: Lansdale Catholic HS (PA)
- 1998–2000: Beaver
- 2000–2004: Air Force (assistant)
- 2004–2005: Air Force
- 2005–present: Richmond

Head coaching record
- Overall: 418–349 (.545) (college)
- Tournaments: 3–3 (NCAA Division I); 5–4 (NIT); 3–3 (CBI)

Accomplishments and honors

Championships
- 2 Atlantic 10 tournament (2011, 2022); Atlantic 10 regular season (2024)

Awards
- Atlantic 10 Coach of the Year (2024)

Christopher Scott Mooney (born August 7, 1972) is an American college basketball coach and the current head men's basketball coach at the University of Richmond. Prior to taking the helm of the Spiders basketball program, he was the head coach at Air Force. In his only year there, he led the Falcons to their second best record in school history (18–12). He played college basketball at Princeton. As a four-year starter at Princeton, he ranks 22nd on the school's all-time leading scoring list with 1,071 points, and 11th in three-point field goals made (142).

== Early years and college ==
Mooney was born and raised in working-class neighborhood in Philadelphia, spending his high school years at Archbishop Ryan High School as the child of a single father after his mother died from breast cancer when he was 13 years old. Mooney's father was a Greyhound bus driver.

In 1990, Mooney enrolled at Princeton University, majoring in English and playing basketball for legendary coach Pete Carril. Mooney was a four-year starter at Princeton, starting all 107 games in his career and amassing 1,071 points, good for 20th place in program history. He finished second for Rookie of the Year in the Ivy League as a freshman and received honorable mention all-conference honors as a sophomore, First Team All-Ivy League honors as a junior and Second Team All-Ivy League honors in his senior year.

== Coaching career ==
Mooney began his coaching career fresh out of college at Lansdale Catholic High School in Lansdale, Pennsylvania. In 1998, Mooney took the helm of the program at Beaver College, now known as Arcadia University. After two years at Beaver, Mooney took an assistant coaching position under Joe Scott at the United States Air Force Academy. When Scott left to take the head coaching position at Princeton University in 2004, Mooney was elevated to the head position at Air Force. After one season at Air Force, Mooney became head coach at the University of Richmond.

The University of Richmond announced on March 27, 2011, following a run to the Sweet Sixteen in the 2011 NCAA Division I men's basketball tournament that Mooney had signed a new contract running through the 2020–21 season.

With an 84–74 win over Wake Forest on December 1, 2018; Mooney tallied his 240th win at Richmond, vaulting him past Dick Tarrant to become the winningest coach in Richmond history.

On February 17, 2023, Richmond announced that Mooney would miss the remainder of the 2022–23 season due to heart surgery to address an aneurysm in his ascending aorta. Assistant coach and former Richmond player Peter Thomas served as interim head coach in Mooney's absence. Mooney returned to the bench shortly after the conclusion of the season.

== Head coaching record ==
=== College ===
Record table
Season	Team	Overall	Conference	Standing	Postseason
Beaver Knights (Pennsylvania Athletic Conference) (1998–2000)
1998–99	Beaver	8–17	7–9	6th	
1999–00	Beaver	16–10	12–4	2nd	
Beaver:		24–27 (.471)	19–13 (.594)		
Air Force Falcons (Mountain West Conference) (2004–2005)
2004–05	Air Force	18–12	9–5	3rd	
Air Force:		18–12 (.600)	9–5 (.643)		
Richmond Spiders (Atlantic 10 Conference) (2005–present)
2005–06	Richmond	13–17	6–10	T–11th	
2006–07	Richmond	8–22	4–12	T–12th	
2007–08	Richmond	16–15	9–7	T–4th	CBI First Round
2008–09	Richmond	20–16	9–7	T–5th	CBI Semifinal
2009–10	Richmond	26–9	13–3	3rd	NCAA Division I Round of 64
2010–11	Richmond	29–8	13–3	3rd	NCAA Division I Sweet 16
2011–12	Richmond	16–16	7–9	T–9th	
2012–13	Richmond	19–15	8–8	T–8th	CBI Quarterfinal
2013–14	Richmond	19–14	8–8	7th	
2014–15	Richmond	21–14	12–6	T–4th	NIT Quarterfinal
2015–16	Richmond	16–16	7–11	9th	
2016–17	Richmond	22–13	13–5	T–3rd	NIT Quarterfinal
2017–18	Richmond	12–20	9–9	T–5th	
2018–19	Richmond	13–20	6–12	T–10th	
2019–20	Richmond	24–7	14–4	2nd	Postseason cancelled due to COVID-19
2020–21	Richmond	14–9	6–5	8th	NIT Quarterfinal
2021–22	Richmond	24–13	10–8	6th	NCAA Division I Round of 32
2022–23	Richmond	13–14*	6–8*	T–11th	
2023–24	Richmond	23–10	15–3	T–1st	NIT First Round
2024–25	Richmond	10–22	5–13	T–13th	
2025–26	Richmond	15–17	5–13	T–11th	
2026–27	Richmond	3–3	0–0		
Richmond:		376–310 (.548)	185–164 (.530)		
Total:		418–349 (.545)			
National champion Postseason invitational champion Conference regular season champion Conference regular season and conference tournament champion Division regular season champion Division regular season and conference tournament champion Conference tournament champion

*Mooney was on medical leave of absence from February 17 through the season end, missing the final six games of the season.
