= Majestic, Kentucky =

Unincorporated community in Kentucky, United States

- Unincorporated community
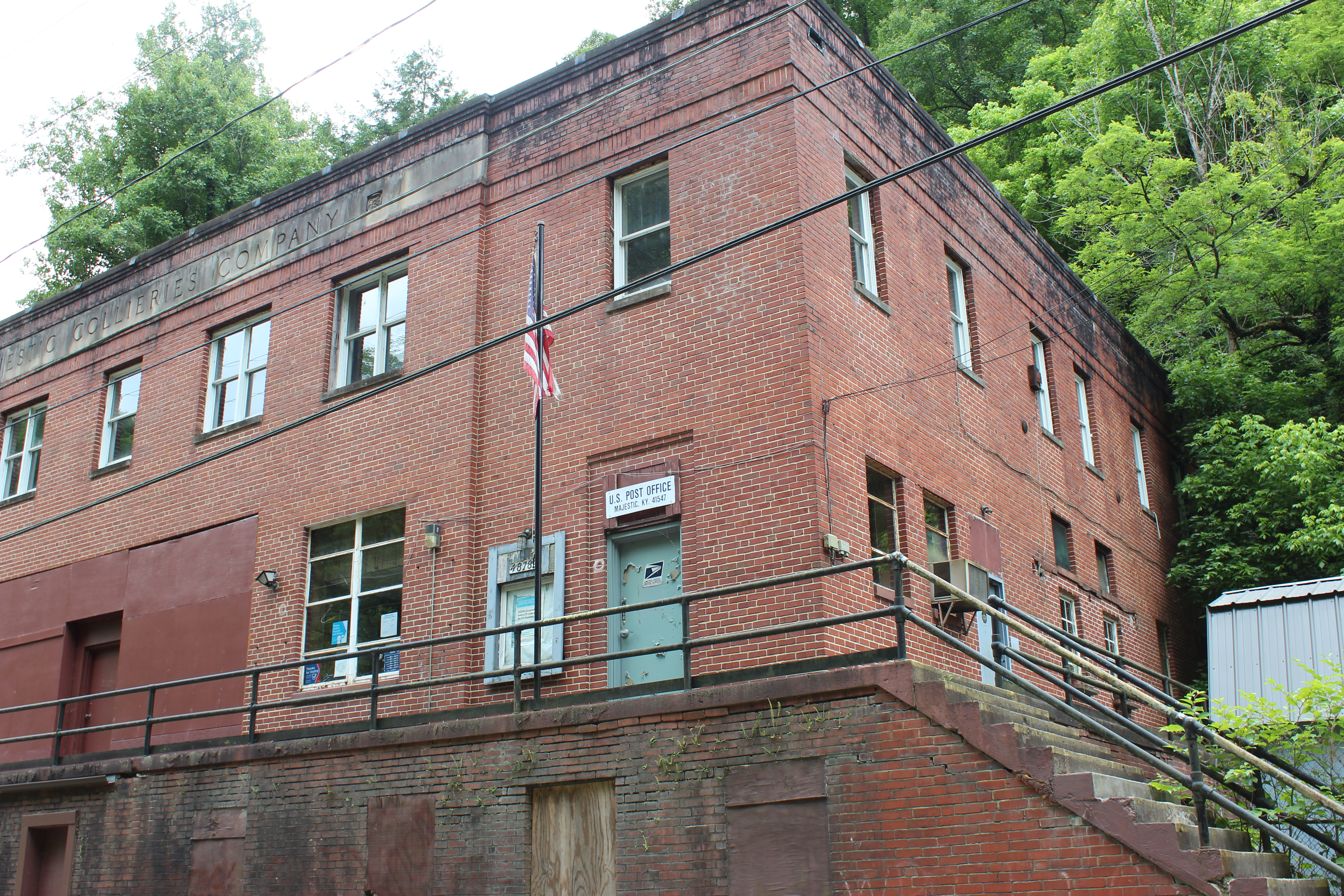
- Majestic Post Office (2024)

- Location within the state of Kentucky Majestic, Kentucky (the United States)
- Coordinates: 37°32′2″N 82°5′59″W
- Country: United States
- State: Kentucky
- County: Pike
- Elevation: 899 ft (274 m)
- Time zone: UTC-5 (Eastern (EST))
  - Summer (DST): UTC-4 (EST)
- ZIP codes: 41547
- GNIS feature ID: 497460

Majestic is an unincorporated community and coal town in Pike County, Kentucky, United States.
