= 2018–19 Richmond Spiders men's basketball team =

American college basketball season

2018–19 Richmond Spiders men's basketball
- Conference: Atlantic 10 Conference
- Record: 13–20 (6–12 A-10)
- Head coach: Chris Mooney (14th season)
- Assistant coaches: Rob Jones; Marcus Jenkins; Kim Lewis
- Home arena: Robins Center

2018–19 Atlantic 10 men's basketball standings
	Conf.				Overall
Team	W		L	PCT	W		L	PCT
VCU	16	–	2	.889	25	–	8	.758
Davidson	14	–	4	.778	24	–	10	.706
Dayton	13	–	5	.722	21	–	12	.636
St. Bonaventure	12	–	6	.667	18	–	16	.529
George Mason	11	–	7	.611	18	–	15	.545
Saint Louis †	10	–	8	.556	23	–	13	.639
Duquesne	10	–	8	.556	19	–	13	.594
Rhode Island	9	–	9	.500	18	–	15	.545
La Salle	8	–	10	.444	10	–	21	.323
Saint Joseph's	6	–	12	.333	14	–	19	.424
Richmond	6	–	12	.333	13	–	20	.394
George Washington	4	–	14	.222	9	–	24	.273
Massachusetts	4	–	14	.222	11	–	21	.344
Fordham	3	–	15	.167	12	–	20	.375
† 2019 Atlantic 10 tournament winner

The 2018–19 Richmond Spiders men's basketball team represented the University of Richmond during the 2018–19 NCAA Division I men's basketball season. They were led by 14th-year head coach Chris Mooney and played their home games at the Robins Center Richmond as members of the Atlantic 10 Conference.

The Spiders finished the season 13–20, 6–12 in A-10 play to finish in a tie with Saint Joseph's for tenth place. As the No. 11 seed in the A-10 tournament, they defeated Fordham in the first round before losing to Saint Louis in the second round.

== Previous season ==
The Spiders finished the 2017–18 season 12–20, 9–9 in A-10 play to finish in a four-way tie for fifth place. As the No. 7 seed in the A-10 tournament, they defeated Duquesne in the second round before losing to St. Bonaventure in the quarterfinals.

== Offseason ==
=== Departures ===
Name	Number	Pos.	Height	Weight	Year	Hometown	Reason for departure
Joe Kirby	1	G	6'1"	205	Senior	Fort Lauderdale, FL	Walk-on; graduated
Khwan Fore	2	G	6'0"	175	RS Junior	Huntsville, AL	Graduate transferred to Louisville
De'Monte Buckingham	11	G	6'4"	230	Sophomore	Richmond, VA	Dismissed from the team due to violating athletics department policy; transferred to Cal State Bakersfield
Phoenix Ford	12	F	6'8"	210	Freshman	St. Petersburg, FL	Transferred to Mississippi Gulf Coast CC
Jordan Madrid-Andrews	25	F	6'8"	240	GS Senior	Denver, CO	Graduated
Paul Friendshuh	44	F	6'10"	240	RS Junior	New Prague, MN	Left the team for personal reasons

=== Incoming transfers ===
Name	Number	Pos.	Height	Weight	Year	Hometown	Previous School
Blake Francis	1	G	6'0"	165	Junior	Herndon, VA	Transferred from Wagner. Under NCAA transfer rules, Francis will have to sit out for the 2018–19 season. Will have two years of remaining eligibility.
Noah Yates	24	F	6'5"	195	GS Senior	Point Pleasant Beach, NJ	Transferred from Yale. Will be eligible to play immediately since Yates graduated from Yale.

=== 2018 recruiting class ===
College recruiting information
Name	Hometown	School	Height	Weight	Commit date
Souleymane Koureissi; SF	New Rochelle, NY	Iona Preparatory School	6 ft 8 in (2.03 m)	180 lb (82 kg)	Oct 31, 2017
Souleymane Koureissi; SF	Recruit ratings: Scout: Rivals: 247Sports: (77)				
Jake Wojcik; SG	San Jose, CA	Bellarmine College Prep	6 ft 4 in (1.93 m)	185 lb (84 kg)	Apr 27, 2018
Jake Wojcik; SG	Recruit ratings: Scout: Rivals: 247Sports: (NR)				
Andre Gustavson; SG	Finland	Finland Basketball Academy	6 ft 4 in (1.93 m)	190 lb (86 kg)	Apr 21, 2018
Andre Gustavson; SG	Recruit ratings: Scout: Rivals: 247Sports: (NR)				
Matt Grace; SG	Hamilton, ON	TRC Academy	6 ft 9 in (2.06 m)	205 lb (93 kg)	May 3, 2018
Matt Grace; SG	Recruit ratings: Scout: Rivals: 247Sports: (NR)				
Overall recruit ranking:
Note: In many cases, Scout, Rivals, 247Sports, On3, and ESPN may conflict in their listings of height and weight.; In these cases, the average was taken. ESPN grades are on a 100-point scale.; Sources: "Rivals.com 2018 Richmond Commitments". Rivals.; "2018 Team Ranking". Rivals.

== Honors and awards ==
=== Preseason Awards ===
Street & Smith's

- All-Conference - Grant Golden
- All-Defense - Jacob Gilyard

Lindy's Sports

- All-Conference Second Team - Grant Golden
- Top Defender - Jacob Gilyard

== Roster ==
2018–19 Richmond Spiders men's basketball team
Players
Coaches

Pos.	#	Name	Height	Weight	Year	Previous school	Hometown
G	0	Jacob Gilyard	5 ft 9 in (1.75 m)	160 lb (73 kg)	So	The Barstow School	Kansas City, Missouri
G	1	Blake Francis (redshirt)	6 ft 0 in (1.83 m)	165 lb (75 kg)	Jr	Westfield High School; Wagner	Herndon, Virginia
F	2	Souleymane Koureissi	6 ft 9 in (2.06 m)	200 lb (91 kg)	Fr	Iona Prep	Harlem, New York
G	4	Nathan Cayo	6 ft 7 in (2.01 m)	205 lb (93 kg)	So	Collège Jean-de-Brébeuf	Montreal, Canada
G	5	Nick Sherod (injured) (redshirt)	6 ft 4 in (1.93 m)	230 lb (104 kg)	Jr	St. Christopher's School	Richmond, Virginia
F	10	Sullivan Kulju (W)	6 ft 6 in (1.98 m)	220 lb (100 kg)	So	Eisenhower Middle/High School	New Berlin, Wisconsin
G	11	Jake Wojcik	6 ft 4 in (1.93 m)	185 lb (84 kg)	Fr	Bellarmine College Prep	San Jose, California
F	15	Matt Grace	6 ft 9 in (2.06 m)	210 lb (95 kg)	Fr	TRC Academy	Hamilton, Ontario
F	21	Tomas Verbinskis	6 ft 7 in (2.01 m)	210 lb (95 kg)	RS Fr	Sagemont School	Klaipeda, Lithuania
G	22	Andre Gustavson	6 ft 4 in (1.93 m)	175 lb (79 kg)	Fr	Helsinki Basketball Academy	Helsinki, Finland
F	24	Noah Yates	6 ft 5 in (1.96 m)	210 lb (95 kg)	GS	Point Pleasant Beach High School; Yale	Point Pleasant Beach, New Jersey
G	30	Keith Oddo	6 ft 1 in (1.85 m)	185 lb (84 kg)	Sr	North Cross School	Roanoke, Virginia
G	31	Jordan Gaitley (W)	6 ft 4 in (1.93 m)	205 lb (93 kg)	So	Fordham Preparatory School	Haverford, Pennsylvania
G	32	Julius Johnson	6 ft 3 in (1.91 m)	200 lb (91 kg)	Sr	Florida Air Academy	Cocoa, Florida
F	33	Grant Golden	6 ft 10 in (2.08 m)	265 lb (120 kg)	RS So	St. James School	Winchester, Virginia

Head coach

- Chris Mooney (Princeton)

Assistant coach(es)

- Rob Jones (Toccoa Falls)
- Kim Lewis (Tulane)
- Marcus Jenkins (Air Force)

Legend

- (C) Team captain
- (S) Suspended
- (I) Ineligible
- (W) Walk-on
- Injured
- Current redshirt

Roster

== Schedule and results ==
Date time, TV	Rank^{#}	Opponent^{#}	Result	Record	High points	High rebounds	High assists	Site (attendance) city, state
Exhibition
October 27, 2018*; 7:00 pm		Hampden–Sydney	W 83–37		14 – Golden	8 – Tied	7 – Gilyard	Robins Center; Richmond, VA
Non-conference regular season
November 9, 2018*; 7:00 pm, ESPN+		Longwood	L 58–63	0–1	15 – Gilyard	7 – Sherod	5 – Gilyard	Robins Center (6,717); Richmond, VA
November 14, 2018*; 11:00 am, ESPN+		St. Francis Brooklyn; Fort Myers Tip-Off	W 88–66	1–1	22 – Sherod	8 – Wojcik	6 – Gilyard	Robins Center (6,851); Richmond, VA
November 16, 2018*; 7:00 pm, ESPN+		IUPUI; Fort Myers Tip-Off	W 78–70	2–1	31 – Gilyard	10 – Golden	6 – Gilyard	Robins Center (5,015); Richmond, VA
November 19, 2018*; 6:30 pm, FS1		vs. Loyola–Chicago; Fort Myers Tip-Off semifinals	L 66–82	2–2	19 – Gilyard	4 – Tied	5 – Gilyard	Suncoast Credit Union Arena (1,550); Fort Myers, FL
November 21, 2018*; 7:00 pm, FS1		vs. Wyoming; Fort Myers Tip-Off	L 66–68	2–3	33 – Golden	9 – Tied	7 – Sherod	Suncoast Credit Union Arena (1,250); Fort Myers, FL
November 25, 2018*; 6:00 pm, ESPN+		Hampton	L 66–86	2–4	23 – Cayo	6 – Cayo	3 – Tied	Robins Center (4,475); Richmond, VA
November 28, 2018*; 7:00 pm, CBSSN		at Georgetown	L 82–90	2–5	22 – Golden	10 – Golden	10 – Gustavson	Capital One Arena (4,912); Washington, D.C.
December 1, 2018*; 7:30 pm, NBCSN		Wake Forest	W 84–74	3–5	24 – Golden	5 – Yates	9 – Gilyard	Robins Center (6,076); Richmond, VA
December 5, 2018*; 7:00 pm, ESPN+		Coppin State	W 82–47	4–5	14 – Gilyard	11 – Golden	5 – Gilyard	Robins Center (4,220); Richmond, VA
December 15, 2018*; 4:00 pm, ESPN+		Oral Roberts	L 52–59	4–6	17 – Cayo	8 – Tied	3 – Yates	Robins Center (5,107); Richmond, VA
December 19, 2018*; 7:00 pm, ESPN+		Old Dominion	L 54–63	4–7	23 – Golden	11 – Golden	6 – Gilyard	Robins Center (5,617); Richmond, VA
December 22, 2018*; 3:00 pm		vs. High Point; DC Hoops Fest	W 74–59	5–7	20 – Cayo	12 – Golden	9 – Gilyard	St. Elizabeths East Entertainment and Sports Arena (1,012); Washington, D.C.
December 29, 2018*; 5:05 pm		at South Alabama	W 91–82	6–7	22 – Golden	8 – Golden	9 – Gilyard	Mitchell Center (1,523); Mobile, AL
A-10 regular season
January 6, 2019; 12:00 pm, NBCSN		at Dayton	L 48–72	6–8 (0–1)	24 – Gilyard	6 – Gilyard	4 – Tied	UD Arena (12,848); Dayton, OH
January 9, 2019; 7:00 pm, ESPN+		Rhode Island	L 67–78	6–9 (0–2)	19 – Gilyard	8 – Golden	6 – Golden	Robins Center (5,006); Richmond, VA
January 12, 2019; 4:00 pm, ESPN+		at George Washington	W 76–56	7–9 (1–2)	18 – Cayo	8 – Wojcik	4 – Tied	Charles E. Smith Center (2,335); Washington, D.C.
January 16, 2019; 7:00 pm, ESPN+		Duquesne	L 68–74	7–10 (1–3)	23 – Cayo	8 – Golden	5 – Gilyard	Robins Center (4,603); Richmond, VA
January 19, 2019; 12:30 pm, NBCSN		at Davidson	L 62–75	7–11 (1–4)	16 – Tied	8 – Cayo	5 – Gilyard	John M. Belk Arena (4,613); Davidson, NC
January 23, 2019; 7:00 pm, ESPN+		at Saint Joseph's	L 70–74	7–12 (1–5)	24 – Golden	5 – Golden	4 – Tied	Hagan Arena (3,088); Philadelphia, PA
January 26, 2019; 6:00 pm, ESPN+		St. Bonaventure	L 57–66	7–13 (1–6)	19 – Gilyard	9 – Golden	3 – Golden	Robins Center (6,503); Richmond, VA
January 30, 2019; 7:00 pm, ESPN+		at Saint Louis	W 84–81	8–13 (2–6)	24 – Gilyard	7 – Golden	4 – Tied	Chaifetz Arena (4,597); St. Louis, MO
February 2, 2019; 6:00 pm, ESPN+		La Salle	L 58–66	8–14 (2–7)	20 – Gilyard	6 – Golden	5 – Golden	Robins Center (6,644); Richmond, VA
February 6, 2019; 7:00 pm, ESPN+		George Mason	W 81–67	9–14 (3–7)	28 – Gilyard	5 – Tied	6 – Tied	Robins Center (4,769); Richmond, VA
February 9, 2019; 6:00 pm, ESPN+		George Washington	W 89–63	10–14 (4–7)	17 – Golden	5 – Golden	5 – Gilyard	Robins Center (6,601); Richmond, VA
February 13, 2019; 7:00 pm, ESPNU		at VCU; Capital City Classic	L 61–80	10–15 (4–8)	17 – Cayo	5 – Golden	4 – Tied	Siegel Center (7,637); Richmond, VA
February 20, 2019; 7:00 pm, ESPN+		Fordham	W 72–69	11–15 (5–8)	16 – Golden	8 – Gilyard	8 – Gilyard	Robins Center (5,001); Richmond, VA
February 23, 2019; 4:00 pm, ESPN+		at La Salle	W 84–75	12–15 (6–8)	24 – Golden	9 – Golden	6 – Golden	Tom Gola Arena (2,653); Philadelphia, PA
February 27, 2019; 7:00 pm, ESPN+		at George Mason	L 63–77	12–16 (6–9)	21 – Johnson	9 – Golden	5 – Golden	EagleBank Arena (3,281); Fairfax, VA
March 2, 2019; 4:00 pm, CBSSN		VCU; Capital City Classic	L 66–69	12–17 (6–10)	23 – Gilyard	10 – Golden	6 – Gilyard	Robins Center (7,201); Richmond, VA
March 6, 2019; 7:00 pm, ESPN+		at Massachusetts	L 79–87	12–18 (6–11)	21 – Golden	9 – Golden	6 – Golden	Mullins Center (2,534); Amherst, MA
March 9, 2019; 6:00 pm, ESPN+		Davidson	L 69–73	12–19 (6–12)	20 – Golden	6 – Golden	6 – Gilyard	Robins Center (7,002); Richmond, VA
A-10 tournament
March 13, 2019; 3:30 pm, ESPN+	(11)	vs. (14) Fordham; First Round	W 52–50	13–19	15 – Cayo	11 – Golden	7 – Golden	Barclays Center (4,278); Brooklyn, NY
March 14, 2019; 8:00 pm, NBCSN	(11)	vs. (6) Saint Louis; Second Round	L 68–71	13–20	20 – Golden	5 – Gustavson	6 – Gilyard	Barclays Center (5,968); Brooklyn, NY
*Non-conference game. ^{#}Rankings from AP Poll. (#) Tournament seedings in parentheses. All times are in Eastern Time.
