= Lou Goetz =

American basketball player and coach (1946–2021)

Biographical details
- Born: March 3, 1946; New Jersey, U.S.
- Died: January 19, 2021 (aged 74); Durham, North Carolina, U.S.

Playing career
- 1966–1969: Rutgers

Coaching career (HC unless noted)
- 1971–1974: Utah (assistant)
- 1975–1978: Duke (assistant)
- 1978–1981: Richmond

Louis Goetz (March 3, 1946 – January 19, 2021) was the head men's basketball coach at the University of Richmond from 1978 through 1981. Prior to leading the Richmond Spiders basketball program, he was the assistant coach at Duke University and the University of Utah under Bill Foster. Goetz played for Rutgers University from 1966 through 1969. He led the Spiders to a 38–44 record over three seasons.

Goetz grew up in Passaic, New Jersey. Both his parents were Jewish and spoke Yiddish; his father was the son of Polish and Romanian immigrants.

Goetz was a land developer in Durham, North Carolina, after his coaching career ended. He died in Durham on January 19, 2021, of cancer.

== Head coaching record ==
| School | Season | Record | Postseason |
|---|---|---|---|
| Richmond | 1978–79 | 10–16 | |
| Richmond | 1979–80 | 13–14 | |
| Richmond | 1980–81 | 15–14 | |
| Total | 3 Seasons | 38–44 | |
