= Robert C. Marshall =

American football and basketball coach

Biographical details
- Born: September 18, 1888; Boston, Massachusetts, U.S.
- Died: March 2, 1972 (aged 83); Volusia, Florida, U.S.

Coaching career (HC unless noted)

Football
- 1918: Richmond
- 1919: Randolph–Macon
- 1920–1921: Howard (AL)
- 1922–1926: Duval HS (FL)

Basketball
- 1918–1919: Richmond
- 1920–1922: Howard (AL)

Administrative career (AD unless noted)
- 1917–1918: George Washington
- 1918–1919: Richmond
- 1919–1920: Randolph–Macon
- 1920–1922: Howard (AL)
- 1922–1927: Duval HS (FL)

Head coaching record
- Overall: 10–19–2 (football); 7–19 (basketball)

Robert Clarence Marshall (September 18, 1888 – March 2, 1972) was an American administrator and coach. He was the head football coach at Richmond College (now known as the University of Richmond) in 1918, Randolph–Macon College in 1919, and Howard College (now known as Samford University) in 1920 and 1921, compiling a career college football record of 10–19–2. Marshall was also the head basketball coach at Richmond for one season (1918–19) and at Howard for two seasons (1920–1922), compiling a career college basketball record of 7–19. From 1933 to 1941, he was the superintendent of Duval County Public Schools.

== Early life ==
Marshall was born on September 18, 1888. He attended Wellesley High School in Wellesley, Massachusetts and was a member of the baseball, football and track teams at the University of Maine. He also attended the University of Florida, Syracuse University, Randolph–Macon College, and Howard College. He earned a bachelor of science from Howard and a master's in education from Syracuse. Marshall competed in amateur athletics for many years and worked in the auditor's office of the Boston and Albany Railroad until 1912, when he was recommended for a teaching position by the Federated Boys' Clubs.

== Career ==
In 1912, Marshall accepted a teaching and coaching position at the George Junior Republic. From 1915 to 1917, he worked at Roanoke City High School, where he led the school's baseball team to a championship. In 1917, he was named athletic director at George Washington University. He then held the same position at the University of Richmond and Randolph–Macon College. Marshall was appointed athletic director at Howard College in August 1920.

In 1922, Marshall was named director of athletics and coach at Duval High School in Jacksonville, Florida. He led the football team to an undefeated season in 1924. In 1927, Duval High was closed and replaced by three new high schools. Marshall was principal of Julia Landon High School during the 1927–28 school year. He was then appointed to the same position at Robert E. Lee High School. From 1933 to 1941, he was superintendent of Duval County Public Schools. In 1948, he was a candidate for state Superintendent of Public Instruction, but lost in the Democratic primary to Thomas D. Bailey.

== Head coaching record ==
=== College football ===
Year	Team	Overall	Conference	Standing	Bowl/playoffs
Richmond Spiders (South Atlantic Intercollegiate Athletic Association) (1918)
1918	Richmond	3–1–1	1–0	3rd	
Richmond:		3–1–1	1–0		
Randolph–Macon Yellow Jackets (Independent) (1919)
1919	Randolph–Macon	1–7			
Randolph–Macon:		1–7			
Howard Bulldogs (Southern Intercollegiate Athletic Association) (1920–1921)
1920	Howard	3–5–1	2–3	14th	
1921	Howard	3–6	1–4	T–21st	
Howard:		6–11–1	3–7		
Total:		10–19–2			

=== College basketball ===
Record table
Season	Team	Overall	Conference	Standing	Postseason
Richmond Spiders (Independent) (1918–1919)
1918–19	Richmond	1–5			
Richmond:		1–5			
Howard Bulldogs (Independent) (1920–1922)
1920–21	Howard	1–5			
1921–22	Howard	5–9			
Howard:		6–14			
Total:		7–19			
