= Lewis Mills (basketball) =

American basketball player & coach (1937-2011)

Lewis Benson Mills
Biographical details
- Born: February 5, 1937; Roanoke, Virginia, U.S.
- Died: October 12, 2011 (aged 74); Richmond, Virginia, U.S.

Playing career
- 195?–1960: Virginia Tech
- Position: Point guard

Coaching career (HC unless noted)
- 1963–1974: Richmond

Administrative career (AD unless noted)
- 1976–1986: VCU
- 1995–1999: Western Kentucky

Accomplishments and honors

Awards
- 2× SoCon Coach of the Year (1968, 1974)

Lewis Benson Mills (February 5, 1937 – October 12, 2011) was the head men's basketball coach at the University of Richmond from 1963 to 1974 and athletic director at Virginia Commonwealth University from 1976 to 1986. In college, Mills was a point guard for the Virginia Tech Hokies and served as captain in his senior year. He was inducted into the Virginia Tech Sports Hall of Fame in 1991. Mills also served as athletic director at Western Kentucky University from 1995 until his retirement in 1999.

== Head coaching record ==
School	Season	Record	Postseason
Richmond	1973–74	16–12	
Richmond	1972–73	8–16	
Richmond	1971–72	6–19	
Richmond	1970–71	7–21	
Richmond	1969–70	9–18	
Richmond	1968–69	13–14	
Richmond	1967–68	12–13	
Richmond	1966–67	11–12	
Richmond	1965–66	12–13	
Richmond	1964–65	10–16	
Richmond	1963–64	6–16	
Total	11 Seasons	110–170	
