= H. Lester Hooker =

American college basketball and baseball coach

Biographical details
- Born: July 27, 1921; Stuart, Virginia, U.S.
- Died: May 13, 1999 (aged 77)

Playing career

Basketball
- 1941–1943: William & Mary

Coaching career (HC unless noted)

Basketball
- 1951–1952: William & Mary
- 1952–1963: Richmond

Baseball
- 1952: William & Mary
- 1966–1970: William & Mary

Administrative career (AD unless noted)
- 1963–1971: William & Mary

Head coaching record
- Overall: 162–155 (basketball); 91–79 (baseball)

Henry Lester Hooker Jr. (July 17, 1921 – May 13, 1999) was an American college basketball and baseball coach. He was the head men's basketball coach at the College of William & Mary (abbreviated as W&M) from 1951 to 1952 and at University of Richmond from 1952 to 1963. He returned to William & Mary in 1963 to serve as athletic director.

In college, Hooker played basketball and baseball at William & Mary. Hooker was inducted into the Virginia Sports Hall of Fame in 1983 and is also a member of the William & Mary and University of Richmond Athletics Halls of Fame.

== Personal life ==
Hooker was the son of Henry Lester Hooker, a W&M graduate and judge. His son, Henry Lester Hooker III, played football and baseball at W&M and later worked as a college football coach.

== Head coaching record ==
=== Basketball ===
Record table
Season	Team	Overall	Conference	Standing	Postseason
William & Mary Indians (Southern Conference) (1951–1952)
1951–52	William & Mary	15–13	10–6	8th	
William & Mary:		15–13	10–6		
Richmond Spiders (Southern Conference) (1952–1963)
1952–53	Richmond	20–7	13–5	7th	
1953–54	Richmond	23–8	10–3	3rd	
1954–55	Richmond	19–9	10–4	3rd	
1955–56	Richmond	16–13	8–6	4th	
1956–57	Richmond	15–11	9–7	5th	
1957–58	Richmond	14–12	8–8	T–5th	
1958–59	Richmond	11–11	6–8	5th	
1959–60	Richmond	7–18	2–12	8th	
1960–61	Richmond	9–14	5–11	6th	
1961–62	Richmond	6–21	5–11	T–8th	
1962–63	Richmond	7–18	3–13	8th	
Richmond:		147–142	79–88		
Total:		162–155			
