= Dick Tarrant =

American basketball coach (born 1928)

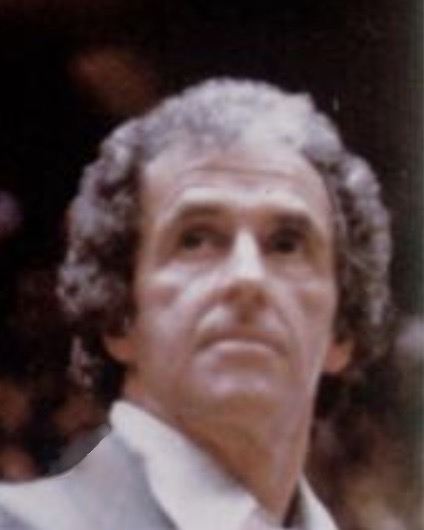
- Tarrant in 1982

Biographical details
- Born: September 15, 1928 (age 98); Jersey City, New Jersey, U.S.
- Education: Fordham University (1951)

Coaching career (HC unless noted)
- 1955–1957: St. Cecilia HS (NJ)
- 1957–1964: Passaic HS (NJ)
- 1965–1969: Fordham (asst.)
- 1975–1978: Clifton HS (NJ)
- 1978–1981: Richmond (asst.)
- 1981–1993: Richmond

Head coaching record
- Overall: 239–126 (.655) (college)
- Tournaments: 5–5 (NCAA Division I); 2–4 (NIT)

Accomplishments and honors

Championships
- 5 CAA regular season (1984, 1985, 1988, 1989, 1992); 4 CAA tournament (1984, 1988, 1990, 1991)

Awards
- 4× CAA Coach of the Year (1984, 1986, 1989, 1991)

Richard Joseph Tarrant Jr. (born September 15, 1928) was the head men's basketball coach at the University of Richmond from 1981 through 1993. Tarrant, led the Spiders to five NCAA tournament and four NIT berths in his twelve seasons as head coach—the first postseason appearances in school history.

Tarrant was raised in Montclair, New Jersey, and played basketball at St. Peter's Preparatory School in Jersey City, New Jersey, before transferring to Immaculate Conception High School in his hometown for his final two years in order to shorten his commute, graduating in 1946. He played collegiately for the Fordham Rams men's basketball team, where Vince Lombardi was one of the assistant coaches on his freshman team. An erroneous claim was widely published purporting that he had played for Lombardi at St. Cecilia High School in Englewood, New Jersey, which was later included in his collegiate coaching biography.

Under Tarrant, the Spiders gained a reputation as giant killers. In their first NCAA appearance, in 1984, they upended an Auburn team led by Charles Barkley in the first round. In 1988, they defeated defending national champion Indiana and Georgia Tech to advance to the Sweet Sixteen—the deepest run by a Colonial Athletic Association team at the time—before losing to Temple. In 1991, Tarrant led the 15th seed Spiders to an upset win over second-seeded Syracuse—the first time that a 15th seed had made it out of the first round.

In 2013, Tarrant was inducted into the Virginia Sports Hall of Fame. In 2015, Richmond named the playing surface at the Robins Center "Dick Tarrant Court" in Tarrant's honor. He left Richmond as the winningest coach in school history, though he has since been passed by Chris Mooney.

== Head coaching record ==
Record table
Season	Team	Overall	Conference	Standing	Postseason
Richmond Spiders (ECAC South / Colonial Athletic Association) (1981–1993)
1981–82	Richmond	18–11	6–4	2nd	NIT first round
1982–83	Richmond	12–16	2–7	6th	
1983–84	Richmond	22–10	7–3	1st	NCAA Division I second round
1984–85	Richmond	21–11	11–3	T–1st	NIT second round
1985–86	Richmond	23–7	12–2	2nd	NCAA Division I first round
1986–87	Richmond	15–14	8–6	3rd	
1987–88	Richmond	26–7	11–3	1st	NCAA Division I Sweet 16
1988–89	Richmond	21–10	13–1	1st	NIT second round
1989–90	Richmond	22–10	10–4	T–2nd	NCAA Division I first round
1990–91	Richmond	22–10	10–4	2nd	NCAA Division I second round
1991–92	Richmond	22–8	12–2	T–1st	NIT first round
1992–93	Richmond	15–12	10–4	3rd	
Richmond:		239–126 (.655)	112–43 (.723)		
Total:		239–126 (.655)			
National champion Postseason invitational champion Conference regular season champion Conference regular season and conference tournament champion Division regular season champion Division regular season and conference tournament champion Conference tournament champion
