= Richmond Spiders men's basketball =

NCAA Division I team of the University of Richmond

2026–27 Richmond Spiders men's basketball team
- University: University of Richmond
- First season: 1913
- Head coach: Chris Mooney (22nd season)
- Location: Richmond, Virginia
- Arena: Robins Center (capacity: 7,201)
- Conference: Atlantic 10
- Nickname: Spiders
- Colors: Blue and red
- All-time record: 1,517–1,314 (.536)

NCAA Division I tournament Sweet Sixteen
- 1988, 2011

NCAA Division I tournament appearances
- 1984, 1986, 1988, 1990, 1991, 1998, 2004, 2010, 2011, 2022

Conference tournament champions
- CAA; 1984, 1988, 1990, 1991, 1998 A-10; 2011, 2022

Conference regular-season champions
- CAA; 1984, 1985, 1988, 1989, 1992, 2001 A-10; 2024

Uniforms
Home	Away	Alternate

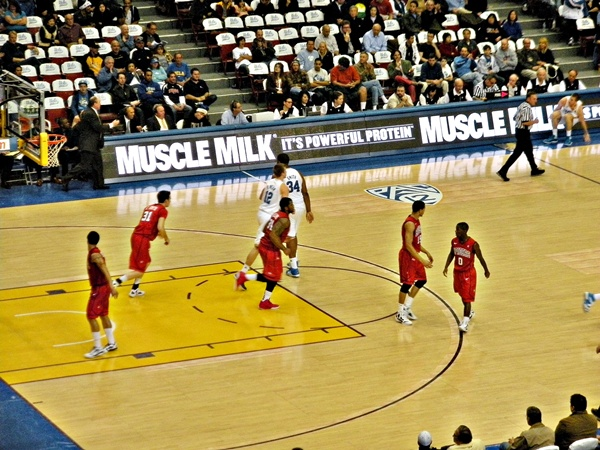
UCLA vs. Richmond, Los Angeles Sports Arena, December 23, 2011

The Richmond Spiders men's basketball team represents the University of Richmond in Richmond, Virginia and currently competes in the Atlantic 10 Conference. The team plays its home games at the Robins Center. The team last played in the NCAA Division I men's basketball tournament in 2022 under head coach Chris Mooney, who has guided the program since the 2005–2006 season.

UR's basketball program has developed a reputation as a "giant killer" in the NCAA tournament, defeating the Charles Barkley-led Auburn Tigers in 1984, reaching the Sweet Sixteen in 1988 by defeating defending national champion Indiana and Georgia Tech, beating #3 seeded South Carolina in 1998, and becoming the first #15 seed to knock off a #2 seed when the Spiders defeated Syracuse in 1991. The Spiders hold the distinction of being the only basketball program to win NCAA tournament games as a 12, 13, 14, and 15 seed.

== Coaches ==
=== Current coaching staff ===
- Chris Mooney – head coach
- Peter Thomas – assistant head coach
- David Boyden – assistant coach
- Will Gipe – assistant coach
- Mark McGonigal – assistant coach/director of basketball operations & recruiting
- Jack Fahed – assistant coach/director of program development

=== All-time head coaches ===
Coach	Years	Win–loss	Win %	Conference titles	NCAA tournament appearances
Frank Dobson	1913–17, 1919–33	168–112	.600	-	-
Dave Satterfield	1917–18	3–6	.333	-	-
Robert Marshall	1918–19	1–5	.166	-	-
Malcolm Pitt	1933–52	197–169	.538	-	-
H. Lester Hooker	1952–63	147–142	.509	-	-
Lewis Mills	1963–74	110–170	.393	-	-
Carl Slone	1974–78	43–63	.406	-	-
Lou Goetz	1978–81	38–44	.434	-	-
Dick Tarrant	1981–93	239–126	.655	4	5
Bill Dooley	1993–97	43–69	.384	-	-
John Beilein	1997–2002	100–53	.654	1	1
Jerry Wainwright	2002–05	50–41	.549	-	1
Chris Mooney	2005–present	376–310	.548	2	3
Peter Thomas	2023 (interim)	2–4	.333	-	-
Totals		1,517–1,314	.536	7	10

== Players ==
=== All-time statistic leaders ===
==== Points ====
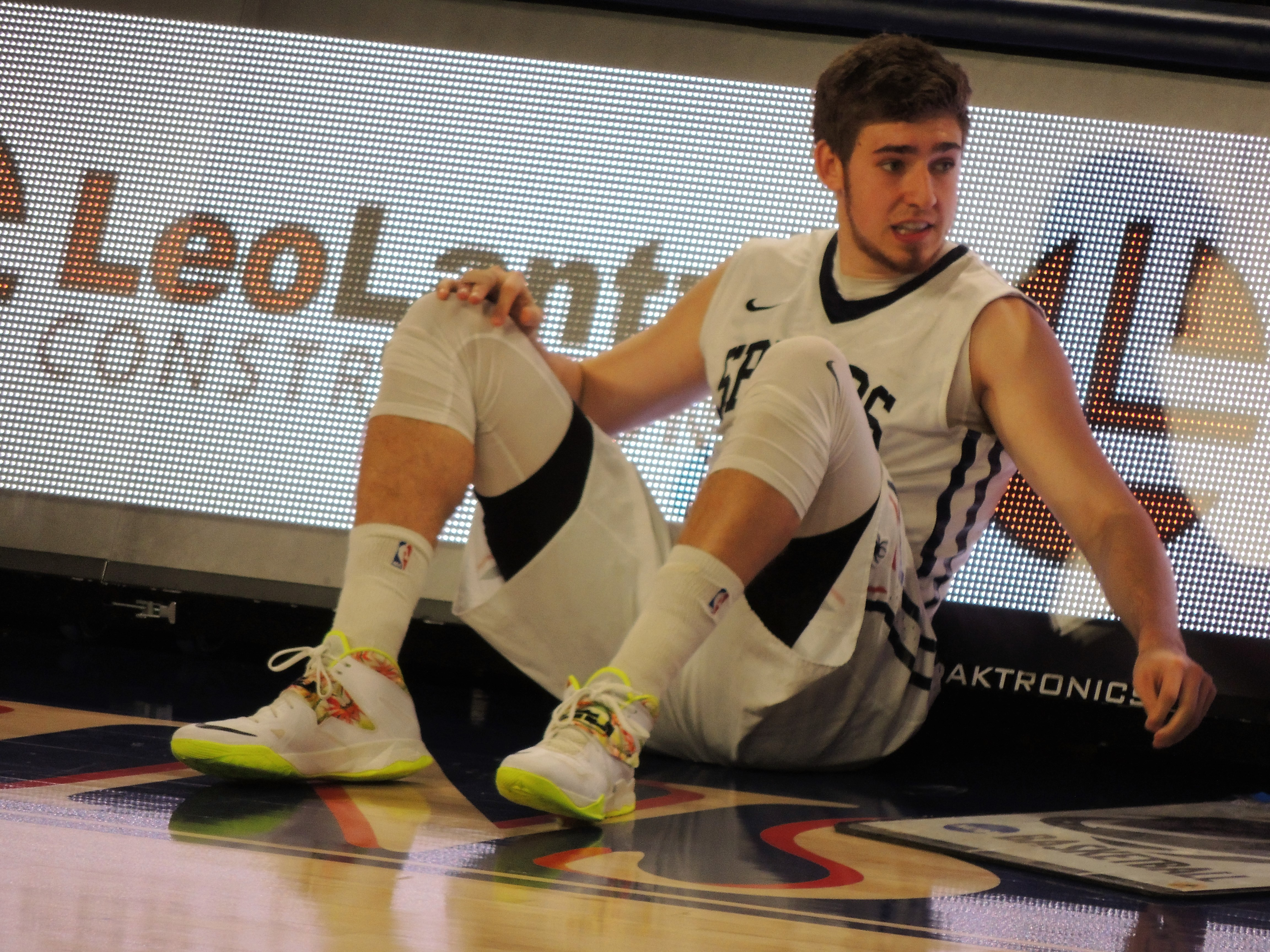
T. J. Cline with Richmond.

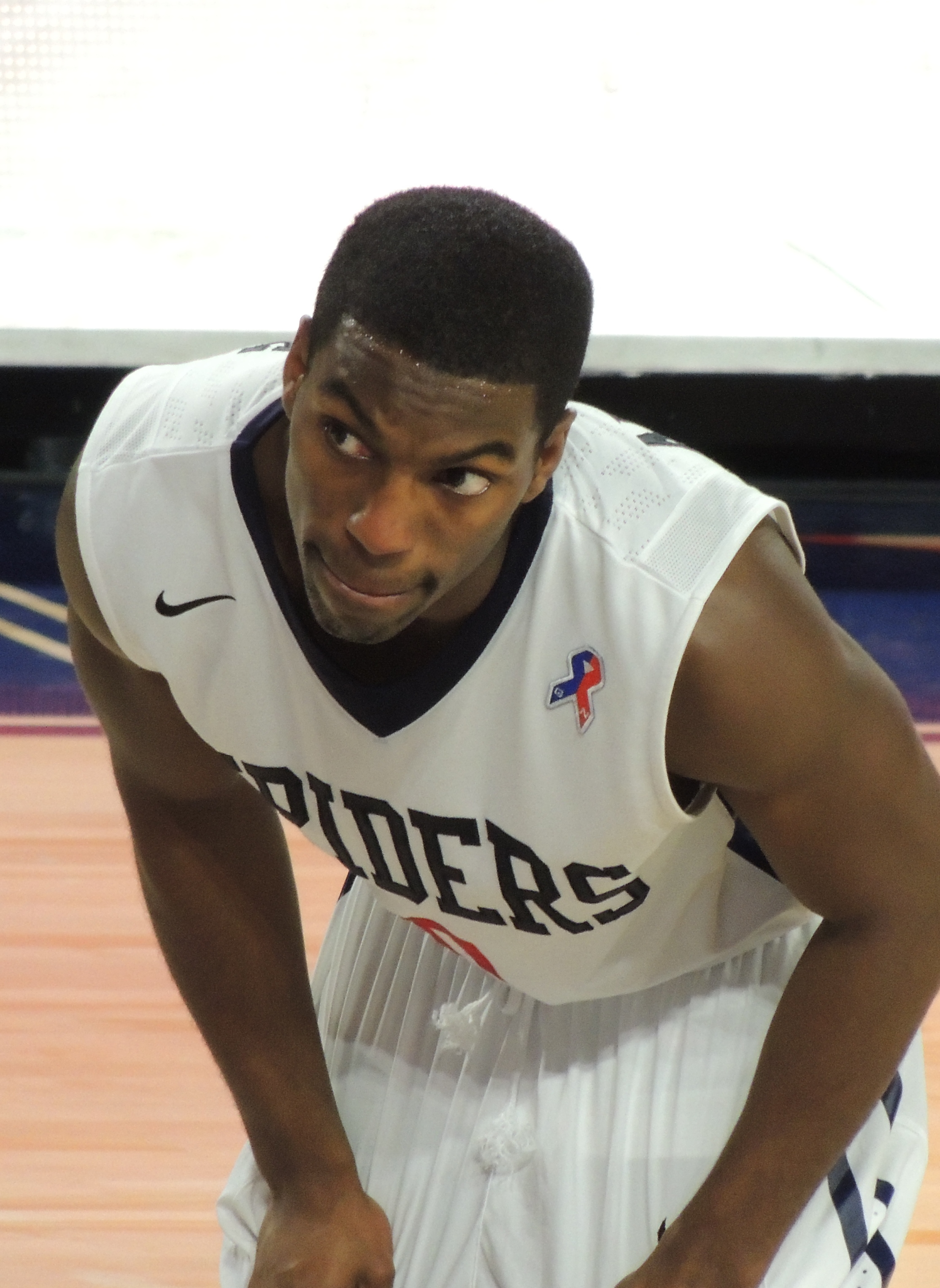
Kendall Anthony with Richmond.

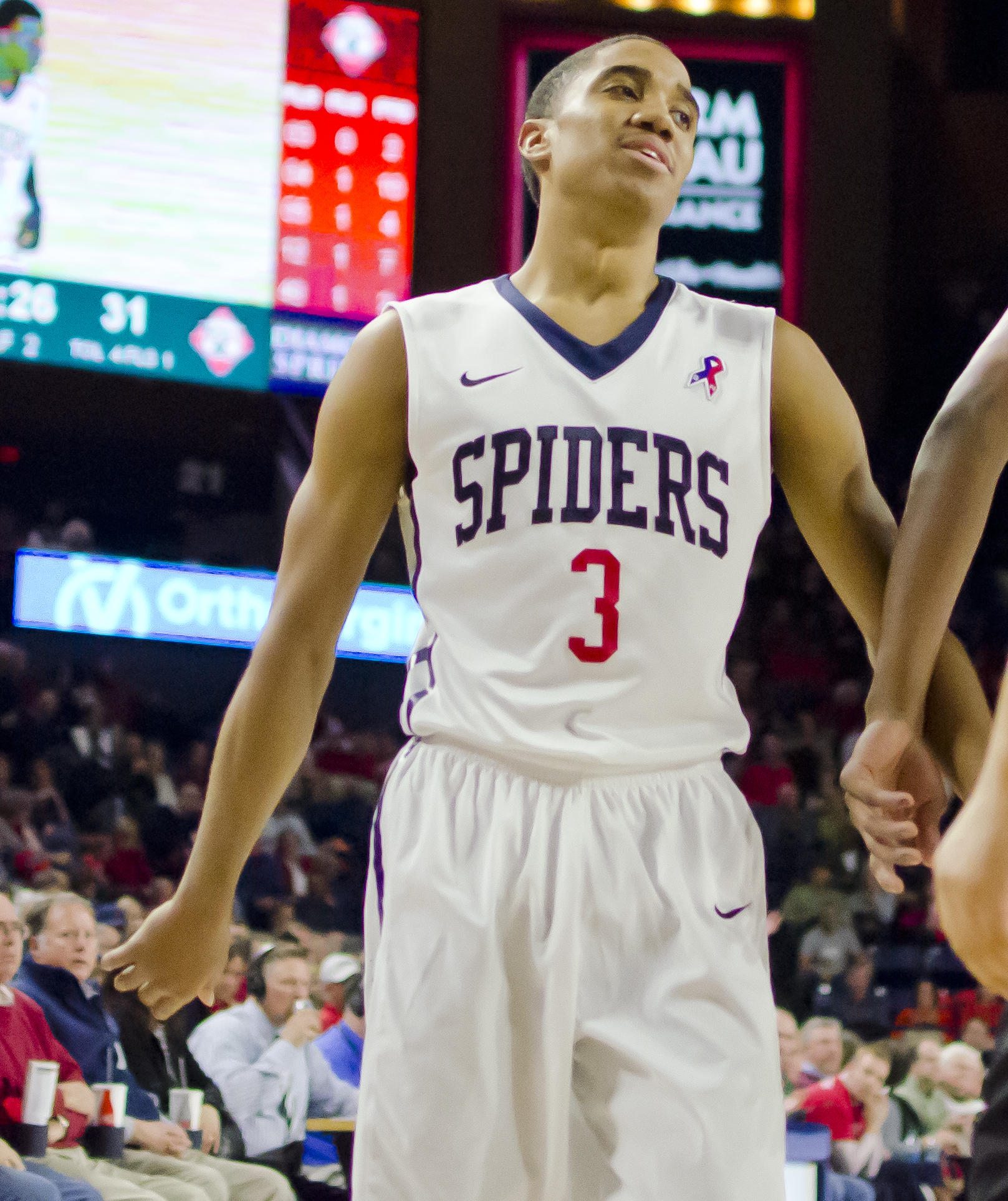
ShawnDre' Jones with Richmond.

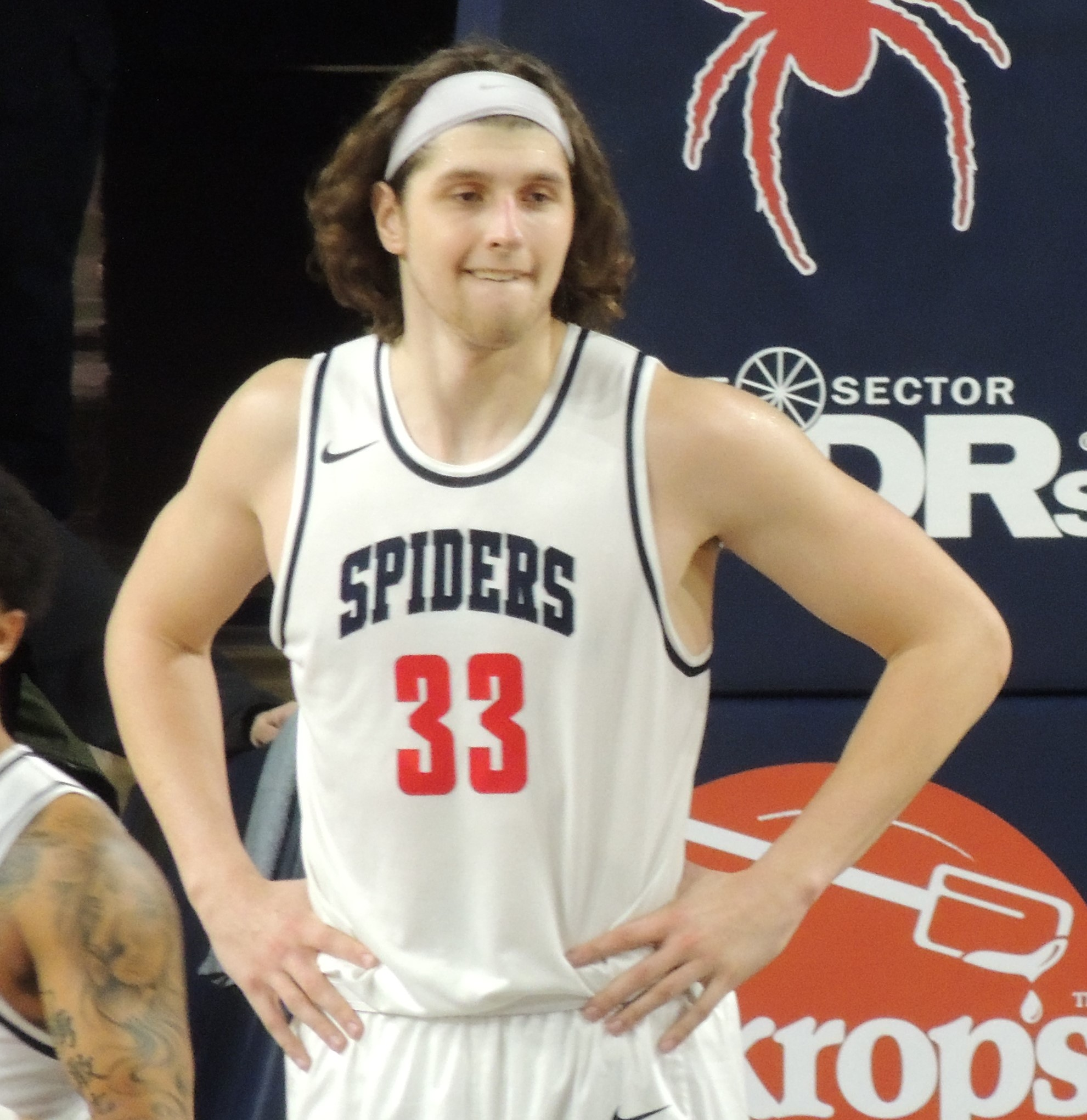
Grant Golden with Richmond.

Rank	Player	Years	Games	PPG avg.	Total points
1	Johnny Newman	1982–86	122	19.5	2,383
2	Grant Golden	2016–22	161	14.0	2,246
3	Kevin Anderson	2007–11	139	15.6	2,165
4	Mike Perry	1977–81	108	19.9	2,145
5	Jacob Gilyard	2017–22	154	13.2	2,039
6	Kendall Anthony	2011–15	134	14.2	1,909
7	Ed Harrison	1952–56	115	16.0	1,843
8	David Gonzalvez	2006–10	131	13.2	1,727
9	John Schweitz	1978–82	109	15.8	1,723
10	T. J. Cline	2014–17	102	16.1	1,647

==== Rebounds ====
Rank	Player	Years	Games	Reb. Avg.	Total Rebounds
1	Ken Daniel	1952–56	114	11.0	1,255
2	Walt Lysaght	1952–56	110	10.8	1,190
3	Grant Golden	2016–22	161	6.3	1,015
4	Eric Poole	1994–98	115	7.8	894
5	Peter Woolfolk	1984–88	123	7.0	859
6	Tyler Burton	2019–23	123	6.7	819
7	Terry Allen	2012–16	134	5.8	782
8	Mike Perry	1977–81	108	6.8	738
9	Tom Green	1964–67	74	9.8	728
10	Kenny Wood	1989–93	118	6.1	717

==== Assists ====
Rank	Player	Years	Games	Ast. Avg.	Total Assists
1	Jacob Gilyard	2017–22	154	5.1	782
2	Greg Beckwith	1982–86	116	4.9	573
3	Scott Ungerer	1998–2002	120	4.0	479
4	Grant Golden	2016–22	161	3.0	476
5	Kenny Atkinson	1986–90	125	3.7	464
6	Kevin Anderson	2007–11	139	2.9	410
7	Carlos Cueto	1994–98	108	3.7	396
8	Scott Stapleton	1986–90	125	3.0	382
9	T. J. Cline	2014–17	102	3.7	374
10	ShawnDre' Jones	2013–17	132	2.8	364

=== Retired numbers ===
Three Spider players have had their numbers retired by the university.

Richmond Spiders retired numbers
No.	Player	Career	Ref.
14	Kevin Anderson	2007–2011	
20	Johnny Newman	1982–1986	
23	Warren Mills	1952–1955	

== All-time postseason results ==
=== NCAA tournament ===
The Spiders have appeared in ten NCAA tournaments. Their combined record is 9–10.

Year	Seed	Round	Opponent	Result
1984	12	Opening Round; First Round; Second Round	(12) Rider (5) Auburn (4) Indiana	W 89–65; W 72–71; L 67–75
1986	11	First Round	(6) St. Joseph's	L 59–60
1988	13	First Round; Second Round; Sweet Sixteen	(4) Indiana (5) Georgia Tech (1) Temple	W 72–69; W 59–55; L 47–69
1990	14	First Round	(3) Duke	L 46–81
1991	15	First Round; Second Round	(2) Syracuse (10) Temple	W 73–69; L 64–77
1998	14	First Round; Second Round	(3) South Carolina (11) Washington	W 62–61; L 66–81
2004	11	First Round	(6) Wisconsin	L 64–76
2010	7	First Round	(10) Saint Mary's	L 71–80
2011	12	First Round; Second Round; Sweet Sixteen	(5) Vanderbilt (13) Morehead State (1) Kansas	W 69–66; W 65–48; L 57–77
2022	12	First Round; Second Round	(5) Iowa (4) Providence	W 67–63; L 51–79

=== NIT ===
The Spiders have appeared in eleven National Invitation Tournaments. Their combined record is 11–11.

Year	Seed	Round	Opponent	Result
1982	NA	First Round	Maryland	L 50–66
1985	NA	First Round; Second Round	Fordham; Indiana	W 59–57; L 53–75
1989	NA	First Round; Second Round	Temple; UAB	W 70–56; L 61–64
1992	NA	First Round	Florida	L 52–66
2001	NA	First Round; Second Round	West Virginia; Dayton	W 79–56; L 56–71
2002	NA	First Round; Second Round; Third Round; Quarterfinals	Wagner; Montana State; Minnesota; Syracuse	W 74–67^{OT} W 63–48; W 67–66; L 46–62
2003	NA	First Round	Providence	L 49–67
2015	1	First Round; Second Round; Quarterfinals	(8) St. Francis Brooklyn (5) Arizona State (2) Miami (FL)	W 84–74; W 76–70^{OT} L 61–63
2017	6	First Round; Second Round; Quarterfinals	(3) Alabama (7) Oakland (4) TCU	W 71–64; W 87–83; L 68–86
2021	2	First Round; Quarterfinals	(3) Toledo (4) Mississippi State	W 76–66; L 67–68
2024	NA	First Round	(3) Virginia Tech	L 58–74

*The NIT in 2006 began using a seeding and region system similar to what is used in the NCAA tournament. Starting in 2022, only the top four teams in each of the four regions received seeds, with their unseeded opponents matched up based partly on geographic considerations.

=== CBI ===
The Spiders have appeared in three College Basketball Invitational tournaments. Their combined record is 3–3.

Year	Seed	Round	Opponent	Result
2008	4	First Round	(1) Virginia	L 64–66
2009	1	First Round; Quarterfinals; Semifinals	(4) St. John's (3) Charleston (4) UTEP	W 75–69; W 74–72; L 69–81
2013	N/A	First Round; Quarterfinals	Bryant; Wright State	W 76–71; L 51–57

== NBA draft history ==
The following Spider players have been selected in the National Basketball Association draft:

Player	Year	Round	Team
Justin Harper	2011	2nd	Cleveland Cavaliers (Immediately traded to Orlando Magic)
Curtis Blair	1992	2nd	Houston Rockets
Johnny Newman	1986	2nd	Cleveland Cavaliers
Kelvin Johnson	1985	5th	Indiana Pacers
Bill Flye	1984	5th	Phoenix Suns
Jeff Pehl	1983	5th	San Antonio Spurs
Tom Bethea	1983	6th	Atlanta Hawks
John Schweitz	1982	6th	Boston Celtics
Michael Perry	1981	9th	Kansas City Kings
Bob McCurdy	1975	8th	Milwaukee Bucks
Aron Stewart	1973; 1974	4th 6th	Capital Bullets; Cleveland Cavaliers
Johnny Moates	1967	13th	Cincinnati Royals
