= 2018–19 St. Bonaventure Bonnies men's basketball team =

American college basketball season

2018–19 St. Bonaventure Bonnies men's basketball
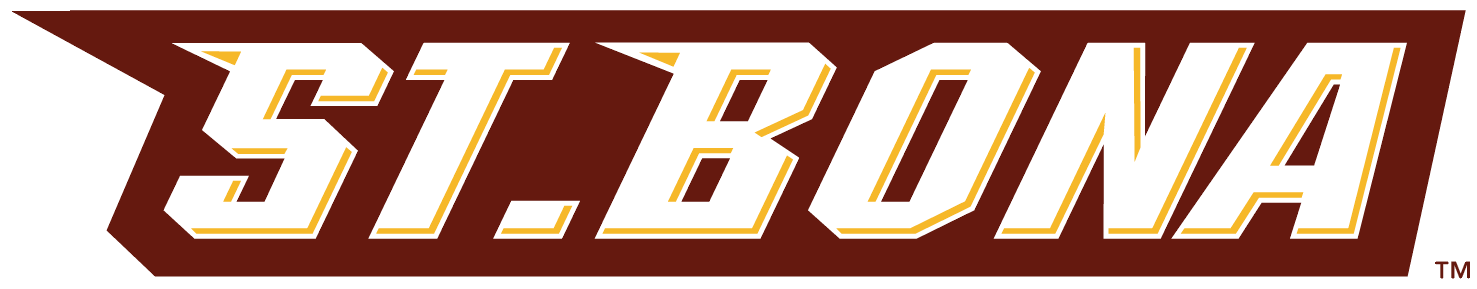
- Conference: Atlantic 10 Conference
- Record: 18–16 (12–6 A-10)
- Head coach: Mark Schmidt (12th season)
- Assistant coaches: Steve Curran; Dwayne Lee; Sean Neal
- Home arena: Reilly Center

2018–19 Atlantic 10 men's basketball standings
	Conf.				Overall
Team	W		L	PCT	W		L	PCT
VCU	16	–	2	.889	25	–	8	.758
Davidson	14	–	4	.778	24	–	10	.706
Dayton	13	–	5	.722	21	–	12	.636
St. Bonaventure	12	–	6	.667	18	–	16	.529
George Mason	11	–	7	.611	18	–	15	.545
Saint Louis †	10	–	8	.556	23	–	13	.639
Duquesne	10	–	8	.556	19	–	13	.594
Rhode Island	9	–	9	.500	18	–	15	.545
La Salle	8	–	10	.444	10	–	21	.323
Saint Joseph's	6	–	12	.333	14	–	19	.424
Richmond	6	–	12	.333	13	–	20	.394
George Washington	4	–	14	.222	9	–	24	.273
Massachusetts	4	–	14	.222	11	–	21	.344
Fordham	3	–	15	.167	12	–	20	.375
† 2019 Atlantic 10 tournament winner

The 2018–19 St. Bonaventure Bonnies men's basketball team represented St. Bonaventure University during the 2018–19 NCAA Division I men's basketball season. The Bonnies, led by 12th-year head coach Mark Schmidt, played their home games at the Reilly Center in Olean, New York as members of the Atlantic 10 Conference. They finished the season 18-16, 12-6 in A-10 play for 4th place. They defeated George Mason and Rhode Island to advance to the championship game where they lost to Saint Louis.

== Previous season ==
The Bonnies finished the 2017–18 season 26–8, 14–4 in A-10 play to finish in second place. They defeated Richmond in the quarterfinals of the A-10 tournament before losing in the semifinals to Davidson. They received one of the last four at-large bids to the NCAA tournament where they defeated UCLA in the First Four before losing in the first round to Florida.

== Offseason ==
=== Departures ===
Name	Number	Pos.	Height	Weight	Year	Hometown	Reason for departure
Idris Taqqee	1	G	6'4"	195	Senior	Snellville, GA	Graduated
Matt Mobley	2	G	6'3"	185	RS Senior	Worcester, MA	Graduated
Jaylen Adams	3	G	6'2"	190	Senior	Baltimore, MD	Graduated
Ndene Gueye	12	C	6'10"	225	Junior	Senegal	Transferred to Texas–Rio Grande Valley
Izaiah Brockington	21	G	6'4"	180	Freshman	Philadelphia, PA	Transferred to Penn State
Josh Ayeni	33	F	6'8"	215	Sophomore	Zaria, Nigeria	Transferred to South Alabama

=== Incoming transfers ===
Name	Number	Pos.	Height	Weight	Year	Hometown	Previous School
Melkisedek Moreaux	12	F	6'8"	195	Junior	Hamburg, Germany	Junior college transferred from Northeast CC
Bobby Planutis		F	6'8"	190	Sophomore	Hazleton, PA	Transferred from Mount St. Mary's. Under NCAA transfer rules, Planutis will have to sit out for the 2018–19 season. Will have three years of remaining eligibility.

=== 2018 recruiting class ===
College recruiting information
Name	Hometown	School	Height	Weight	Commit date
Dominick Welch #67 SF	Cheektowaga, NY	Cheektowaga Central High School	6 ft 6 in (1.98 m)	215 lb (98 kg)	Jul 25, 2016
Dominick Welch #67 SF	Recruit ratings: Scout: Rivals: (72)				
Kyle Lofton; PG	Hillside, NJ	Putnam Science Academy	6 ft 3 in (1.91 m)	175 lb (79 kg)	Mar 8, 2018
Kyle Lofton; PG	Recruit ratings: Scout: Rivals: (NR)				
Alpha Okoli; SG	Bellflower, CA	St. John Bosco High School	6 ft 3 in (1.91 m)	N/A	May 5, 2018
Alpha Okoli; SG	Recruit ratings: Scout: Rivals: (NR)				
Osun Osunniyi; C	Pleasantville, NJ	Putnam Science Academy	6 ft 10 in (2.08 m)	185 lb (84 kg)	May 21, 2018
Osun Osunniyi; C	Recruit ratings: Scout: Rivals: (NR)				
Overall recruit ranking:
Note: In many cases, Scout, Rivals, 247Sports, On3, and ESPN may conflict in their listings of height and weight.; In these cases, the average was taken. ESPN grades are on a 100-point scale.; Sources: "2018 Team Ranking". Rivals.

== Roster ==
2018–19 St. Bonaventure Bonnies men's basketball team
Players
Coaches

Pos.	#	Name	Height	Weight	Year	Previous school	Hometown
G	0	Kyle Lofton	6 ft 3 in (1.91 m)	180 lb (82 kg)	Fr	Putnam Science Academy	Hillside, New Jersey
G	1	Dominick Welch	6 ft 3 in (1.91 m)	185 lb (84 kg)	Fr	SPIRE Institute	Buffalo, New York
G	3	Alpha Okoli	6 ft 5 in (1.96 m)	185 lb (84 kg)	Fr	St. John Bosco High School	Los Angeles, California
G	4	Nelson Kaputo	6 ft 0 in (1.83 m)	175 lb (79 kg)	Sr	St. Michael's College School	Toronto, Ontario
F	5	Tshiefu Ngalakulondi	6 ft 7 in (2.01 m)	220 lb (100 kg)	So	Proctor Academy	Manchester, New Hampshire
F	11	Courtney Stockard	6 ft 5 in (1.96 m)	205 lb (93 kg)	RS Sr	Allen Community College	St. Louis, Missouri
F	12	Melkisedek Moreaux	6 ft 8 in (2.03 m)	210 lb (95 kg)	Jr	Northeast Community College	Hamburg, Germany
F	15	LaDarien Griffin	6 ft 6 in (1.98 m)	215 lb (98 kg)	Sr	Providence School	Jacksonville, Florida
F/C	21	Osun Osunniyi	6 ft 10 in (2.08 m)	190 lb (86 kg)	Fr	Putnam Science Academy	Pleasantville, New Jersey
G	23	Jalen Poyser	6 ft 4 in (1.93 m)	180 lb (82 kg)	RS Jr	UNLV	Malton, Ontario
G	24	Jack Galatio (W)	5 ft 10 in (1.78 m)	165 lb (75 kg)	Jr	Hornell High School	Hornell, New York
C	32	Amadi Ikpeze	6 ft 10 in (2.08 m)	245 lb (111 kg)	Jr	Amherst Central High School	Buffalo, New York
G/F		Bobby Planutis (redshirt)	6 ft 8 in (2.03 m)	190 lb (86 kg)	So	Mount St. Mary's	Hazleton, Pennsylvania

Head coach

- Mark Schmidt (Boston College)

Assistant coach(es)

- Steve Curran (Merrimack)
- Dwayne Lee (Saint Joseph's)
- Sean Neal (La Salle)

Legend

- (C) Team captain
- (S) Suspended
- (I) Ineligible
- (W) Walk-on
- Injured
- Current redshirt

Roster

== Schedule and results ==
Date time, TV	Rank^{#}	Opponent^{#}	Result	Record	High points	High rebounds	High assists	Site (attendance) city, state
Exhibition
November 2, 2018*; 7:15 pm, ESPN+		Alfred University	W 90–42		20 – Okoli	14 – Griffin	6 – Griffin	Reilly Center; Olean, NY
Non-conference regular season
November 7, 2018*; 7:00 pm, ESPN+		Bucknell	L 85–88 ^{OT}	0–1	18 – Lofton	10 – Griffin	4 – Tied	Reilly Center (4,668); Olean, NY
November 10, 2018*; 2:00 pm, ESPN+		Jackson State; Cayman Islands Classic campus game	W 67–36	1–1	23 – Poyser	7 – Okoli	3 – Lofton	Reilly Center (3,797); Olean, NY
November 12, 2018*; 7:00 pm		at Niagara	L 72–80	1–2	21 – Poyser	13 – Ngalakulondi	4 – Lofton	Gallagher Center (2,221); Lewiston, NY
November 19, 2018*; 5:00 pm, Stadium		vs. Georgia State; Cayman Islands Classic quarterfinals	L 65–75	1–3	23 – Poyser	7 – Ikpeze	4 – Lofton	John Gray Gymnasium (780); George Town, Cayman Islands
November 20, 2018*; 5:00 pm, Stadium		vs. Boise State; Cayman Islands Classic	L 52–72	1–4	22 – Poyser	7 – Ngalakulondi	2 – Tied	John Gray Gymnasium (829); George Town, Cayman Islands
November 21, 2018*; 10:00 am, Stadium		vs. Akron; Cayman Islands Classic	L 49–61	1–5	14 – Kaputo	12 – Ngalakulondi	4 – Lofton	John Gray Gymnasium (566); George Town, Cayman Islands
November 28, 2018*; 7:00 pm, ESPN+		Canisius	W 70–55	2–5	19 – Stockard	11 – Osunniyi	9 – Lofton	Reilly Center (3,685); Olean, NY
December 1, 2018*; 4:00 pm, ESPN+		Delaware State	W 90–61	3–5	20 – Poyser	9 – Ikpeze	8 – Poyser	Reilly Center (3,864); Olean, NY
December 5, 2018*; 7:00 pm, ESPN+		Siena; Franciscan Cup	W 82–40	4–5	21 – Kaputo	9 – Stockard	4 – Tied	Reilly Center (3,485); Olean, NY
December 8, 2018*; 4:00 pm, ESPN+		No. 17 Buffalo	L 62–80	4–6	18 – Stockard	6 – Stockard	6 – Lofton	Reilly Center (5,480); Olean, NY
December 18, 2018*; 7:00 pm		at Vermont	L 76–83 ^{2OT}	4–7	27 – Stockard	9 – Tied	4 – Lofton	Patrick Gym (2,389); Burlington, VT
December 21, 2018*; 12:00 pm, NESN		at Northeastern; A10–CAA Challenge	L 59–64	4–8	17 – Stockard	7 – Osunniyi	3 – Stockard	Matthews Arena (2,348); Boston, MA
December 29, 2018*; 2:00 pm, ESPNU		at Syracuse	L 48–81	4–9	12 – Tied	7 – Osunniyi	3 – Lofton	Carrier Dome (21,968); Syracuse, NY
Atlantic 10 regular season
January 6, 2019; 4:00 pm, NBCSN		at George Mason	L 53–68	4–10 (0–1)	17 – Lofton	5 – Stockard	6 – Lofton	EagleBank Arena (4,028); Fairfax, VA
January 9, 2019; 7:00 pm, Stadium		Saint Joseph's	W 73–47	5–10 (1-1)	19 – Griffin	12 – Osunniyi	6 – Lofton	Reilly Center (2,748); Olean, NY
January 12, 2019; 4:30 pm		vs. Fordham; Roc City Hoops Classic	W 71–64	6–10 (2–1)	17 – Tied	12 – Osunniyi	4 – Tied	Blue Cross Arena (4,914); Rochester, NY
January 16, 2019; 6:30 pm, CBSSN		at Rhode Island	L 63–75	6–11 (2–2)	12 – Griffin	8 – Stockard	2 – Tied	Ryan Center (5,616); Kingston, RI
January 19, 2019; 4:30 pm, NBCSN		Dayton	L 86–89 ^{2OT}	6–12 (2–3)	36 – Stockard	10 – Stockard	7 – Lofton	Reilly Center (5,480); Olean, NY
January 23, 2019; 7:00 pm, ESPN+		at Massachusetts	W 65–51	7–12 (3–3)	24 – Lofton	9 – Tied	4 – Tied	Mullins Center (2,551); Amherst, MA
January 26, 2019; 6:00 pm, ESPN+		at Richmond	W 66–57	8–12 (4–3)	21 – Lofton	11 – Osunniyi	6 – Stockard	Robins Center (6,503); Richmond, VA
February 1, 2019; 7:00 pm, ESPN2		Davidson	L 66–75	8–13 (4–4)	26 – Lofton	7 – Stockard	5 – Stockard	Reilly Center (5,480); Olean, NY
February 6, 2019; 7:00 pm, Stadium		at Duquesne	W 51–49	9–13 (5–4)	16 – Lofton	22 – Osunniyi	4 – Stockard	Palumbo Center (2,433); Pittsburgh, PA
February 9, 2019; 2:00 pm, CBSSN		VCU	L 55–85	9–14 (5–5)	15 – Stockard	8 – Stockard	2 – Stockard	Reilly Center (5,382); Olean, NY
February 12, 2019; 6:30 pm, CBSSN		at Saint Joseph's	W 76–51	10–14 (6–5)	19 – Stockard	10 – Griffin	4 – Welch	Hagan Arena (1,851); Philadelphia, PA
February 17, 2019; 2:00 pm, Stadium		George Mason	W 79–57	11–14 (7–5)	32 – Lofton	11 – Osunniyi	7 – Lofton	Reilly Center (4,803); Olean, NY
February 20, 2019; 7:00 pm, ESPN+		La Salle	W 62–60	12–14 (8–5)	18 – Lofton	13 – Osunniyi	6 – Stockard	Reilly Center (3,711); Olean, NY
February 23, 2019; 4:30 pm, NBCSN		at Fordham	W 74–53	13–14 (9–5)	20 – Poyser	11 – Tied	5 – Stockard	Rose Hill Gymnasium (2,387); Bronx, NY
February 27, 2019; 7:00 pm, ESPN+		Duquesne	W 68–47	14–14 (10–5)	21 – Stockard	11 – Griffin	6 – Tied	Reilly Center (3,991); Olean, NY
March 2, 2019; 4:00 pm, ESPN+		at George Washington	W 64–58	15–14 (11–5)	18 – Osunniyi	16 – Osunniyi	5 – Stockard	Charles E. Smith Center (2,974); Washington, D.C.
March 6, 2019; 7:00 pm, Stadium		at Davidson	L 46–64	15–15 (11–6)	14 – Welch	11 – Osunniyi	5 – Lofton	John M. Belk Arena (3,986); Davidson, NC
March 9, 2019; 1:00 pm, ESPN+		Saint Louis	W 66–57	16–15 (12–6)	20 – Stockard	6 – Osunniyi	7 – Stockard	Reilly Center (4,819); Olean, NY
Atlantic 10 tournament
March 15, 2019; 2:30 pm, NBCSN	(4)	vs. (5) George Mason; Quarterfinals	W 68–57	17–15	20 – Tied	11 – Griffin	6 – Stockard	Barclays Center (7,194); Brooklyn, NY
March 16, 2019; 1:00 pm, CBSSN	(4)	vs. (8) Rhode Island; Semifinals	W 68–51	18–15	23 – Lofton	11 – Osunniyi	5 – Lofton	Barclays Center (8,133); Brooklyn, NY
March 17, 2019; 1:00 pm, CBS	(4)	vs. (6) Saint Louis; Championship Game	L 53–55	18–16	22 – Stockard	11 – Griffin	4 – Lofton	Barclays Center (8,371); Brooklyn, NY
*Non-conference game. ^{#}Rankings from AP Poll/Coaches' Poll. (#) Tournament seedings in parentheses. All times are in Eastern Time.
