= 2018–19 George Washington Colonials men's basketball team =

American college basketball season

2018–19 George Washington Colonials men's basketball
- Conference: Atlantic 10 Conference
- Record: 9–24 (4–14 A-10)
- Head coach: Maurice Joseph (3rd season)
- Assistant coaches: Hajj Turner; Chris Holm; Greg Paulus
- Home arena: Charles E. Smith Center

2018–19 Atlantic 10 men's basketball standings
	Conf.				Overall
Team	W		L	PCT	W		L	PCT
VCU	16	–	2	.889	25	–	8	.758
Davidson	14	–	4	.778	24	–	10	.706
Dayton	13	–	5	.722	21	–	12	.636
St. Bonaventure	12	–	6	.667	18	–	16	.529
George Mason	11	–	7	.611	18	–	15	.545
Saint Louis †	10	–	8	.556	23	–	13	.639
Duquesne	10	–	8	.556	19	–	13	.594
Rhode Island	9	–	9	.500	18	–	15	.545
La Salle	8	–	10	.444	10	–	21	.323
Saint Joseph's	6	–	12	.333	14	–	19	.424
Richmond	6	–	12	.333	13	–	20	.394
George Washington	4	–	14	.222	9	–	24	.273
Massachusetts	4	–	14	.222	11	–	21	.344
Fordham	3	–	15	.167	12	–	20	.375
† 2019 Atlantic 10 tournament winner

The 2018–19 George Washington Colonials men's basketball team represented George Washington University during the 2018–19 NCAA Division I men's basketball season. The Colonials were led by third-year head coach Maurice Joseph and played their home games at the Charles E. Smith Center in Washington, D.C. as members of the Atlantic 10 Conference. They finished the season9–24, 4–14 in A-10 play to finish in a tie for 12th place. As the No. 12 seed, they defeated Massachusetts in the first round of the A-10 tournament before losing to George Mason in the second round.

George Washington parted ways with Maurice Joseph on March 15, 2019 after three seasons and an overall record of 44–57. On March 21, the school hired Siena head coach Jamion Christian as the new head coach.

== Previous season ==
The Colonials finished the 2017–18 season with a record of 15–18, 7–11 in A-10 play to finish in a three-way tie for 10th place. They defeated Fordham in the first round of the A-10 tournament before losing to Saint Louis in the second round.

== Offseason ==
=== Departures ===
Name	Number	Pos.	Height	Weight	Year	Hometown	Reason for departure
Jair Bolden	3	G	6'4"	205	Sophomore	Brooklyn, NY	Transferred to South Carolina
Patrick Steeves	10	F	6'7"	232	RS Senior	Montreal, QC	Graduated
Yuta Watanabe	12	G	6'8"	196	Senior	Miki, Kagawa, Japan	Graduated/Went undrafted in 2018 NBA draft
Jack Granger	30	G	5'7"	185	Senior	Middlefield, CT	Walk-on; graduated
Bo Zeigler	35	F	6'6"	200	RS Senior	Detroit, MI	Graduated

=== Incoming transfers ===
Name	Number	Pos.	Height	Weight	Year	Hometown	Previous School
Chris Sodom	33	C	7'3"	220	Sophomore	Kaduna, Nigeria	Transferred from Georgetown. Under NCAA transfer rules, Sodom will sit out the 2018–19 season. Will have three years of remaining eligibility.

=== 2018 recruiting class ===
College recruiting information
Name	Hometown	School	Height	Weight	Commit date
Marcus Littles #68 C	Philadelphia, PA	Neumann-Goretti High School	6 ft 8 in (2.03 m)	258 lb (117 kg)	Sep 23, 2017
Marcus Littles #68 C	Recruit ratings: 247Sports: ESPN: (68)				
Shandon Brown #74 PG	Chestnut Hill, MA	New Hampton School	5 ft 9 in (1.75 m)	145 lb (66 kg)	Aug 19, 2017
Shandon Brown #74 PG	Recruit ratings: 247Sports: ESPN: (64)				
Chimezie Offurum; SF	Washington, D.C.	Georgetown Prep	6 ft 5 in (1.96 m)	145 lb (66 kg)	Sep 11, 2017
Chimezie Offurum; SF	Recruit ratings: No ratings found				
Overall recruit ranking:
Note: In many cases, Scout, Rivals, 247Sports, On3, and ESPN may conflict in their listings of height and weight.; In these cases, the average was taken. ESPN grades are on a 100-point scale.; Sources: "George Washington 2018 Player Commits". ESPN.; "2018 Team Ranking". Rivals.

== Honors and awards ==
Street & Smith's Preseason Awards

- All-Defense - Terry Nolan Jr.

== Roster ==
2018–19 George Washington Colonials men's basketball team
Players
Coaches

Pos.	#	Name	Height	Weight	Year	Previous school	Hometown
G	0	Justin Mazzulla	6 ft 3 in (1.91 m)	195 lb (88 kg)	So	Bishop Hendricken High School	Warwick, Rhode Island
G	1	Terry Nolan Jr.	6 ft 2 in (1.88 m)	180 lb (82 kg)	So	Mount Carmel High School	Essex, Maryland
G	2	Armel Potter	6 ft 1 in (1.85 m)	182 lb (83 kg)	RS Jr	Sprayberry High School; Charleston Southern	Marietta, Georgia
G	4	Justin Williams	6 ft 3 in (1.91 m)	218 lb (99 kg)	Jr	Annapolis Area Christian School	Severn, Maryland
G	5	Adam Mitola	6 ft 3 in (1.91 m)	192 lb (87 kg)	Jr	Gill St. Bernard's School	Florham Park, New Jersey
F	11	Arnaldo Toro	6 ft 9 in (2.06 m)	248 lb (112 kg)	Jr	St. Benedict's Prep	Hormigueros, Puerto Rico
G	12	Shandon Brown	5 ft 10 in (1.78 m)	175 lb (79 kg)	Fr	New Hampton School	Boston, Massachusetts
G	13	D. J. Williams	6 ft 7 in (2.01 m)	215 lb (98 kg)	RS Jr	Simeon Academy; Illinois	Chicago, Illinois
G	14	Maceo Jack	6 ft 5 in (1.96 m)	190 lb (86 kg)	So	St. Thomas More School	Buffalo, New York
F	15	Mezie Offurum	6 ft 6 in (1.98 m)	220 lb (100 kg)	Fr	Georgetown Prep	Germantown, Maryland
F	21	Luke Sasser (W)	6 ft 5 in (1.96 m)	205 lb (93 kg)	RS Jr	Carlisle School; Charlotte	Raleigh, North Carolina
F	32	Javier Langarica	6 ft 9 in (2.06 m)	228 lb (103 kg)	So	Bilbao National High School	Bilbao, Spain
C	33	Chris Sodom (redshirt)	7 ft 3 in (2.21 m)	220 lb (100 kg)	So	Tennessee Prep (Memphis); Georgetown	Kaduna, Nigeria
F	35	Marcus Littles	6 ft 9 in (2.06 m)	260 lb (118 kg)	Fr	Neumann Goretti High School	Philadelphia, Pennsylvania

Head coach

- Maurice Joseph (Vermont)

Assistant coach(es)

- Hajj Turner (Louisville)
- Chris Holm (Vermont)
- Greg Paulus (Duke)

Legend

- (C) Team captain
- (S) Suspended
- (I) Ineligible
- (W) Walk-on
- Injured
- Current redshirt

Roster

== Schedule and results ==
Date time, TV	Rank^{#}	Opponent^{#}	Result	Record	High points	High rebounds	High assists	Site (attendance) city, state
Exhibition
October 28, 2018*; 4:00 pm		Catholic University	W 69–64		15 – Williams	13 – Toro	5 – Mazzulla	Charles E. Smith Center (1,879); Washington, D.C.
Non-conference regular season
November 6, 2018*; 7:00 pm, ESPN+		Stony Brook; Hall of Fame Tip Off campus-site game	L 74–77 ^{OT}	0–1	21 – Potter	11 – Toro	3 – Brown	Charles E. Smith Center (3,188); Washington, D.C.
November 8, 2018*; 7:00 pm, ESPN+		Siena; Hall of Fame Tip Off campus-site game	L 61–69	0–2	18 – Mazzulla	9 – Tied	3 – Potter	Charles E. Smith Center (2,083); Washington, D.C.
November 11, 2018*; 2:00 pm, ACCN Extra		at No. 5 Virginia	L 57–76	0–3	17 – Williams	8 – Toro	3 – Potter	John Paul Jones Arena (13,574); Charlottesville, VA
November 17, 2018*; 12:00 pm, ESPN3		vs. No. 18 Michigan; Hall of Fame Tip Off Naismith semifinals	L 61–84	0–4	16 – D. Williams	9 – Toro	2 – Tied	Mohegan Sun Arena; Uncasville, CT
November 18, 2018*; 4:00 pm, ESPN2		vs. South Carolina; Hall of Fame Tip Off Naismith 3rd place game	L 55–90	0–5	13 – Nolan Jr.	9 – Williams	3 – Tied	Mohegan Sun Arena; Uncasville, CT
November 24, 2018*; 4:00 pm, ESPN+		Manhattan	W 70–43	1–5	16 – Williams	13 – Toro	6 – Potter	Charles E. Smith Center (1,590); Washington, D.C.
November 28, 2018*; 7:00 pm, ESPN+		Vermont	L 53–69	1–6	14 – Toro	11 – Toro	3 – Williams	Charles E. Smith Center (2,252); Washington, D.C.
December 1, 2018*; 8:00 pm		at Princeton	L 52–73	1–7	17 – Williams	7 – Jack	4 – Mazzulla	Jadwin Gymnasium (1,932); Princeton, NJ
December 5, 2018*; 7:00 pm, ESPN+		Towson; A10–CAA Challenge	W 68–64	2–7	24 – Nolan Jr.	5 – Tied	3 – Tied	Charles E. Smith Center (1,915); Washington, D.C.
December 8, 2018*; 4:00 pm, ESPN+		Valparaiso	L 79–82	2–8	23 – Jack	5 – Tied	7 – Mazzulla	Charles E. Smith Center (2,107); Washington, D.C.
December 14, 2018*; 7:00 pm, ESPN+		Howard	W 70–64	3–8	18 – Williams	9 – Nolan Jr.	4 – Tied	Charles E. Smith Center (2,630); Washington, D.C.
December 22, 2018*; 7:00 pm, ESPN+		at Harvard	L 61–75	3–9	11 – Mazzulla	7 – D. Williams	4 – Mazzulla	Lavietes Pavilion; Cambridge, MA
December 29, 2018*; 7:00 pm, ESPN+		American	W 71–67 ^{OT}	4–9	19 – Mazzulla	12 – Langarica	5 – Jack	Charles E. Smith Center (2,096); Washington, D.C.
Atlantic 10 regular season
January 6, 2019; 2:00 pm, NBCSN		at Saint Joseph's	W 70–56	5–9 (1–0)	23 – Nolan, Jr.	12 – Nolan, Jr.	6 – Mazulla	Hagan Arena (3,309); Philadelphia, PA
January 9, 2019; 7:00 pm, ESPN+		Dayton	L 66–72	5–10 (1–1)	20 – Williams	10 – Nolan, Jr.	4 – Tied	Charles E. Smith Center (2,325); Washington, D.C.
January 12, 2019; 4:00 pm, ESPN+		Richmond	L 56–76	5–11 (1–2)	15 – Nolan, Jr.	6 – Jack	4 – Mazzulla	Charles E. Smith Center (2,335); Washington, D.C.
January 16, 2019; 8:00 pm, ESPN+		at La Salle	W 59–56	6–11 (2–2)	14 – Williams	10 – Nolan, Jr.	4 – Potter	Tom Gola Arena (1,245); Philadelphia, PA
January 20, 2019; 4:00 pm, NBCSN		Duquesne	L 85–91 ^{OT}	6–12 (2–3)	19 – Langarica	10 – Langarica	8 – Mazzulla	Charles E. Smith Center (2,608); Washington, D.C.
January 23, 2019; 7:00 pm, ESPN+		at Davidson	L 62–73	6–13 (2–4)	15 – Mazzulla	10 – Nolan, Jr.	3 – Potter	John M. Belk Arena (3,489); Davidson, NC
January 26, 2019; 7:00 pm, ESPN+		at George Mason; Revolutionary Rivalry	L 55–62	6–14 (2–5)	15 – Nolan, Jr.	12 – Langarica	3 – Mazzulla	EagleBank Arena (6,683); Fairfax, VA
January 30, 2019; 7:00 pm, Stadium		Fordham	W 79–61	7–14 (3–5)	30 – Williams	9 – Mazzulla	6 – Mazzulla	Charles E. Smith Center (1,922); Washington, D.C.
February 6, 2019; 7:00 pm, ESPN+		VCU	L 50–60	7–15 (3–6)	16 – Williams	6 – Jack	4 – Mazzulla	Charles E. Smith Center (2,959); Washington, D.C.
February 9, 2019; 6:00 pm, ESPN+		at Richmond	L 63–89	7–16 (3–7)	24 – Jack	4 – Langarica	8 – Mazzulla	Robins Center (6,601); Richmond, VA
February 13, 2019; 6:30 pm, CBSSN		Saint Louis	L 58–73	7–17 (3–8)	21 – Williams	5 – Williams	3 – Potter	Charles E. Smith Center (2,012); Washington, D.C.
February 16, 2019; 12:00 pm, NBCSN		at Duquesne	L 69–85	7–18 (3–9)	21 – Williams	13 – Langarica	5 – Mazzulla	Palumbo Center (3,001); Pittsburgh, PA
February 20, 2019; 7:00 pm, ESPN+		Massachusetts	W 79–67	8–18 (4–9)	20 – Jack	7 – Jack	4 – Potter	Charles E. Smith Center (2,468); Washington, D.C.
February 23, 2019; 2:00 pm, ESPN+		at VCU	L 57–85	8–19 (4–10)	22 – Williams	7 – Williams	4 – Mazzulla	Siegel Center (7,637); Richmond, VA
February 26, 2019; 7:00 pm, ESPN+		at Rhode Island	L 53–80	8–20 (4–11)	14 – Langarica	12 – Langarica	4 – Mazzulla	Ryan Center (5,423); Kingston, RI
March 2, 2019; 4:00 pm, ESPN+		St. Bonaventure	L 58–64	8–21 (4–12)	28 – Jack	11 – Langarica	3 – Mazzulla	Charles E. Smith Center (2,974); Washington, D.C.
March 6, 2019; 7:00 pm, ESPN+		at Fordham	L 56–67	8–22 (4–13)	12 – Mazzulla	15 – Langarica	2 – Mazzulla	Rose Hill Gymnasium (1,914); Bronx, NY
March 9, 2019; 2:00 pm, Stadium		George Mason; Revolutionary Rivalry	L 65–81	8–23 (4–14)	18 – Williams	9 – Langarica	7 – Mazzulla	Charles E. Smith Center; Washington, D.C.
Atlantic 10 tournament
March 13, 2019; 1:00 pm, ESPN+	(12)	vs. (13) Massachusetts; First Round	W 68–64	9–23	20 – Nolan Jr.	11 – Langarica	2 – Tied	Barclays Center (4,278); Brooklyn, NY
March 14, 2019; 2:30 pm, NBCSN	(12)	vs. (5) George Mason; Second Round	L 57–61	9–24	12 – Potter	12 – Langarica	4 – Potter	Barclays Center (6,802); Brooklyn, NY
*Non-conference game. ^{#}Rankings from AP Poll. (#) Tournament seedings in parentheses. All times are in Eastern Time.

== See also ==
- 2018–19 George Washington Colonials women's basketball team
