= 2018–19 Davidson Wildcats men's basketball team =

American college basketball season

2018–19 Davidson Wildcats men's basketball

NIT, first round
- Conference: Atlantic 10 Conference
- Record: 24–10 (14–4 A-10)
- Head coach: Bob McKillop (30th season)
- Assistant coaches: Matt McKillop; Will Reigel; Kevin Kuwik
- Home arena: John M. Belk Arena

2018–19 Atlantic 10 men's basketball standings
	Conf.				Overall
Team	W		L	PCT	W		L	PCT
VCU	16	–	2	.889	25	–	8	.758
Davidson	14	–	4	.778	24	–	10	.706
Dayton	13	–	5	.722	21	–	12	.636
St. Bonaventure	12	–	6	.667	18	–	16	.529
George Mason	11	–	7	.611	18	–	15	.545
Saint Louis †	10	–	8	.556	23	–	13	.639
Duquesne	10	–	8	.556	19	–	13	.594
Rhode Island	9	–	9	.500	18	–	15	.545
La Salle	8	–	10	.444	10	–	21	.323
Saint Joseph's	6	–	12	.333	14	–	19	.424
Richmond	6	–	12	.333	13	–	20	.394
George Washington	4	–	14	.222	9	–	24	.273
Massachusetts	4	–	14	.222	11	–	21	.344
Fordham	3	–	15	.167	12	–	20	.375
† 2019 Atlantic 10 tournament winner

The 2018–19 Davidson Wildcats men's basketball team represented Davidson College during the 2018–19 NCAA Division I men's basketball season. The Wildcats were led by 30th-year head coach Bob McKillop and played their home games at the John M. Belk Arena in Davidson, North Carolina as fifth-year members of the Atlantic 10 Conference. The Wildcats finished the season 24–10, 14–4 to finish as runners-up in the Atlantic 10 regular season. They defeated Saint Joseph's in the quarterfinals of the A-10 tournament before losing to Saint Louis in the semifinals. They received an at-large bid to the National Invitation Tournament as a No. 4 seed, where they lost to Lipscomb in the first round.

== Previous season ==
The Wildcats finished the 2017–18 season 21–12, 13–5 in the A-10 to finish in third place. In the A-10 tournament they defeated Saint Louis, St. Bonaventure, and Rhode Island to be A-10 Tournament champions. They received the A-10's automatic bid to the NCAA tournament where they lost in the first round to Kentucky.

== Offseason ==
=== Departures ===
Name	Number	Pos.	Height	Weight	Year	Hometown	Reason for departure
Jordan Watkins	2	G	6'1"	165	Senior	Charlotte, NC	Graduated
Michael Brown	14	G	5'10"	165	Sophomore	Gainesville, FL	Walk-on; didn't return
Oskar Michelsen	15	F	6'9"	220	Senior	Helsinki, Finland	Graduated
Will Magarity	22	F	6'11"	250	RS Senior	Stockholm, Sweden	Graduated
Peyton Aldridge	23	F	6'8"	225	Senior	Leavittsville, OH	Graduated/went undrafted in 2018 NBA draft
Rusty Reigel	32	G	6'2"	205	Senior	Charlotte, NC	Graduated

=== 2018 recruiting class ===
College recruiting information
Name	Hometown	School	Height	Weight	Commit date
Michael Jones; SG	Woodbury, MN	Woodbury High School	6 ft 4 in (1.93 m)	177 lb (80 kg)	Aug 8, 2017
Michael Jones; SG	Recruit ratings: Scout: Rivals: 247Sports: (NR)				
David Czerapowicz; SG	Gothenburg, Sweden	Marks Gymnasieskola	6 ft 3 in (1.91 m)	190 lb (86 kg)	Jun 29, 2017
David Czerapowicz; SG	Recruit ratings: Scout: Rivals: 247Sports: (NR)				
Nelson Boachie-Yiadom; PF	London, England	Loomis Chaffee School	6 ft 8 in (2.03 m)	N/A	Oct 1, 2017
Nelson Boachie-Yiadom; PF	Recruit ratings: Scout: Rivals: 247Sports: (NR)				
Luka Brajkovic; C	Feldkirch, Austria	Gymnasium Schillerstraße	6 ft 10 in (2.08 m)	210 lb (95 kg)	Mar 4, 2018
Luka Brajkovic; C	Recruit ratings: Scout: Rivals: 247Sports: (NR)				
Overall recruit ranking:
Note: In many cases, Scout, Rivals, 247Sports, On3, and ESPN may conflict in their listings of height and weight.; In these cases, the average was taken. ESPN grades are on a 100-point scale.; Sources: "2018 Team Ranking". Rivals.

== Roster ==
2018–19 Davidson Wildcats men's basketball team
Players
Coaches

Pos.	#	Name	Height	Weight	Year	Previous school	Hometown
F	1	Nathan Ekwu	6 ft 7 in (2.01 m)	245 lb (111 kg)	RS Sr	Cardinal Hayes High School	Enugu, Nigeria
G	3	Jón Axel Guðmundsson	6 ft 4 in (1.93 m)	190 lb (86 kg)	Jr	Fjölbrautaskóli Suðurnesja	Grindavík, Iceland
G	4	Cal Freundlich (W)	6 ft 2 in (1.88 m)	155 lb (70 kg)	Jr	Friends Seminary	New York, New York
G	5	Malcolm Wynter (W)	5 ft 10 in (1.78 m)	155 lb (70 kg)	Jr	Harborfields High School	Greenlawn, New York
G	13	Mike Jones	6 ft 4 in (1.93 m)	180 lb (82 kg)	Fr	Woodbury High School	Woodbury, Minnesota
F	15	Patrick Casey (W)	6 ft 6 in (1.98 m)	205 lb (93 kg)	Jr	Fort Mill High School	Fort Mill, South Carolina
G	20	KiShawn Pritchett	6 ft 6 in (1.98 m)	225 lb (102 kg)	RS Jr	Lake Norman High School	Mooresville, North Carolina
G	24	Carter Collins	6 ft 3 in (1.91 m)	180 lb (82 kg)	So	East Chapel Hill High School	Chapel Hill, North Carolina
F	25	Bates Jones (W)	6 ft 8 in (2.03 m)	200 lb (91 kg)	So	Charlotte Latin School	Charlotte, North Carolina
G	31	Kellan Grady	6 ft 5 in (1.96 m)	195 lb (88 kg)	So	Northfield Mount Hermon School	Boston, Massachusetts
F	32	Nelson Boachie-Yiadom	6 ft 8 in (2.03 m)	200 lb (91 kg)	Fr	Loomis Chaffee School	London, England
G	34	Luke Frampton	6 ft 5 in (1.96 m)	200 lb (91 kg)	RS Fr	Poca High School	Poca, West Virginia
F	35	Luka Brajkovic	6 ft 10 in (2.08 m)	220 lb (100 kg)	Fr	Gymnasium Schillerstraße	Feldkirch, Austria
F	43	Dusan Kovacevic	6 ft 10 in (2.08 m)	245 lb (111 kg)	RS Jr	Rabun Gap-Nacoochee School	Novi Sad, Serbia
G	53	David Czerapowicz	6 ft 3 in (1.91 m)	190 lb (86 kg)	Fr	Marks Gymnasieskola	Gothenburg, Sweden

Head coach

- Bob McKillop (Hofstra)

Assistant coach(es)

- Matt McKillop (Davidson)
- Will Reigel (Davidson)
- Kevin Kuwik (Notre Dame)

Legend

- (C) Team captain
- (S) Suspended
- (I) Ineligible
- (W) Walk-on
- Injured
- Current redshirt

Roster

== Schedule and results ==
Date time, TV	Rank^{#}	Opponent^{#}	Result	Record	Site (attendance) city, state
Exhibition
November 1, 2018*; 7:00 pm, ESPN+		Washington and Lee	W 116–56		John M. Belk Arena (2,574); Davidson, NC
Non-conference regular season
November 6, 2018*; 7:00 pm, ESPN+		Cleveland State	W 83–63	1–0	John M. Belk Arena (2,663); Davidson, NC
November 9, 2018*; 7:00 pm, ESPN+		Dartmouth	W 79–76	2–0	John M. Belk Arena (3,521); Davidson, NC
November 15, 2018*; 7:00 pm, ESPN3		vs. Wichita State; Charleston Classic quarterfinals	W 57–53	3–0	TD Arena (4,017); Charleston, SC
November 16, 2018*; 6:30 pm, ESPNU		vs. No. 23 Purdue; Charleston Classic semifinals	L 58–79	3–1	TD Arena (4,135); Charleston, SC
November 18, 2018*; 6:00 pm, ESPNU		vs. Northeastern; Charleston Classic 3rd place game	W 71–59	4–1	TD Arena (3,985); Charleston, SC
November 24, 2018*; 1:00 pm, ESPN+		Northeastern; Charleston Classic campus game	W 78–69	5–1	John M. Belk Arena (3,885); Davidson, NC
November 27, 2018*; 7:00 pm, ESPN+		Charlotte	W 76–56	6–1	John M. Belk Arena (3,736); Davidson, NC
December 1, 2018*; 7:00 pm		at UNC Wilmington; A10–CAA Challenge	W 91–85	7–1	Trask Coliseum (4,084); Wilmington, NC
December 4, 2018*; 7:00 pm, ESPN+		Winthrop	W 99–81	8–1	John M. Belk Arena (3,191); Davidson, NC
December 15, 2018*; 4:30 pm		vs. Temple; Boardwalk Classic	L 75–77 ^{OT}	8–2	Boardwalk Hall; Atlantic City, NJ
December 17, 2018*; 7:00 pm, ESPNU		at Wake Forest	L 63–67	8–3	LJVM Coliseum (6,149); Winston-Salem, NC
December 22, 2018*; 12:00 pm, ESPN+		Central Penn College	W 88–54	9–3	John M. Belk Arena (3,094); Davidson, NC
December 29, 2018*; 12:00 pm, ESPN2		at No. 14 North Carolina	L 60–82	9–4	Dean Smith Center (21,486); Chapel Hill, NC
A-10 regular season
January 5, 2019; 6:00 pm, NBCSN		Duquesne	W 65–61	10–4 (1–0)	John M. Belk Arena (4,558); Davidson, NC
January 9, 2019; 7:00 pm, ESPN+		at George Mason	W 61–56	11–4 (2–0)	EagleBank Arena (3,012); Fairfax, VA
January 12, 2019; 2:00 pm, CBSSN		VCU	W 64–57	12–4 (3–0)	John M. Belk Arena (4,556); Davidson, NC
January 15, 2019; 9:00 pm, ESPNU		at Saint Joseph's	L 60–61	12–5 (3–1)	Hagan Arena; Philadelphia, PA
January 19, 2019; 12:30 pm, NBCSN		Richmond	W 75–62	13–5 (4–1)	John M. Belk Arena; Davidson, NC
January 23, 2019; 7:00 pm, ESPN+		George Washington	W 73–62	14–5 (5–1)	John M. Belk Arena; Davidson, NC
January 26, 2019; 2:00 pm, CBSSN		at Saint Louis	W 54–53	15–5 (6–1)	Chaifetz Arena (9,358); St. Louis, MO
February 1, 2019; 7:00 pm, ESPN2		at St. Bonaventure	W 75–66	16–5 (7–1)	Reilly Center (5,480); Olean, NY
February 6, 2019; 7:00 pm, ESPNU		Rhode Island	W 68–53	17–5 (8–1)	John M. Belk Arena (4,341); Davidson, NC
February 9, 2019; ESPN+		at Massachusetts	L 51–54	17–6 (8–2)	Mullins Center (3,878); Amherst, MA
February 12, 2019; 7:00 pm, ESPN+		at Fordham	W 79–69	18–6 (9–2)	Rose Hill Gymnasium (1,813); Bronx, NY
February 15, 2019; 7:00 pm, ESPN2		Saint Joseph's	W 80–72	19–6 (10–2)	John M. Belk Arena (4,643); Davidson, NC
February 19, 2019; 6:00 pm, CBSSN		Dayton	L 73–74	19–7 (10–3)	John M. Belk Arena; Davidson, NC
February 22, 2019; 9:00 pm, ESPN2		at Rhode Island	W 75–66	20–7 (11–3)	Ryan Center (5,543); Kingston, RI
February 27, 2019; 6:00 pm, ESPN+		at La Salle	L 69–79	20–8 (11–4)	Tom Gola Arena (1,536); Philadelphia, PA
March 2, 2019; 1:00 pm, Stadium		Fordham	W 77–52	21–8 (12–4)	John M. Belk Arena (4,447); Davidson, NC
March 6, 2019; 7:00 pm, Stadium		St. Bonaventure	W 64–46	22–8 (13–4)	John M. Belk Arena (3,986); Davidson, NC
March 9, 2019; 6:00 pm, ESPN+		at Richmond	W 73–69	23–8 (14–4)	Robins Center (7,002); Richmond, VA
A-10 tournament
March 15, 2019; 6:00 pm, NBCSN	(2)	vs. (10) Saint Joseph's; Quarterfinals	W 70–60	24–8	Barclays Center (6,857); Brooklyn, NY
March 16, 2019; 3:30 pm, CBSSN	(2)	vs. (6) Saint Louis; Semifinals	L 44–67	24–9	Barclays Center (8,133); Brooklyn, NY
NIT
March 19, 2019*; 7:00 pm, ESPN3	(4)	(5) Lipscomb; First round – UNC Greensboro bracket	L 81–89	24–10	John M. Belk Arena (1,647); Davidson, NC
*Non-conference game. ^{#}Rankings from AP Poll. (#) Tournament seedings in parentheses. All times are in Eastern Time.
