= 2018–19 Saint Joseph's Hawks men's basketball team =

American college basketball season

2018–19 Saint Joseph's Hawks men's basketball
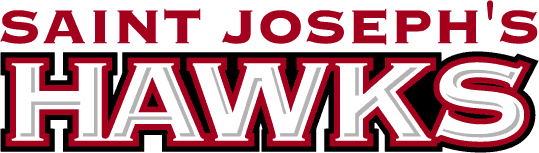
- Conference: Atlantic 10 Conference
- Record: 14–19 (6–12 A-10)
- Head coach: Phil Martelli (24th season)
- Assistant coaches: Mark Bass; David Duda; Geoff Arnold
- Home arena: Hagan Arena

2018–19 Atlantic 10 men's basketball standings
	Conf.				Overall
Team	W		L	PCT	W		L	PCT
VCU	16	–	2	.889	25	–	8	.758
Davidson	14	–	4	.778	24	–	10	.706
Dayton	13	–	5	.722	21	–	12	.636
St. Bonaventure	12	–	6	.667	18	–	16	.529
George Mason	11	–	7	.611	18	–	15	.545
Saint Louis †	10	–	8	.556	23	–	13	.639
Duquesne	10	–	8	.556	19	–	13	.594
Rhode Island	9	–	9	.500	18	–	15	.545
La Salle	8	–	10	.444	10	–	21	.323
Saint Joseph's	6	–	12	.333	14	–	19	.424
Richmond	6	–	12	.333	13	–	20	.394
George Washington	4	–	14	.222	9	–	24	.273
Massachusetts	4	–	14	.222	11	–	21	.344
Fordham	3	–	15	.167	12	–	20	.375
† 2019 Atlantic 10 tournament winner

The 2018–19 Saint Joseph's Hawks basketball team represented Saint Joseph's University during the 2018–19 NCAA Division I men's basketball season. The Hawks were led by 24th-year head coach Phil Martelli, and played their home games at Hagan Arena in Philadelphia, Pennsylvania as members of the Atlantic 10 Conference. They finished the season 14–19 overall, 6–12 in A-10 play to finish in a tie for tenth place. As the No. 10 seed in the A-10 tournament, they advanced to the quarterfinals, where they lost to Davidson.

On March 19, 2019, Phil Martelli was fired after 24 seasons as the head coach. He ended his tenure at Saint Joseph's with a 444–328 record. Shortly thereafter, the school hired Philadelphia 76ers assistant coach Billy Lange as head coach.

== Previous season ==
The Hawks finished the 2017–18 season 16–16, 10–8 in A-10 play to finish in fourth place. They defeated George Mason in the quarterfinals of the A-10 tournament before losing to Rhode Island in the semifinals.

== Offseason ==
=== Departures ===
Name	Number	Pos.	Height	Weight	Year	Hometown	Reason for departure
Shavar Newkirk	1	G	6'0"	185	Senior	Bronx, NY	Graduated
Michael Booth	3	G	6'3"	205	Senior	Thornton, PA	Walk-on; graduated
Nick Robinson	5	G	6'6"	195	Sophomore	Chicago, IL	Transferred to Valparaiso
Gerald Blount	10	F	6'6"	225	Sophomore	Bayonne, NJ	Transferred to West Georgia
Christian Vega	13	G	6'0"	188	Senior	Guaynabo, PR	Walk-on; graduated
Kyle Thompson	21	G	6'2"	200	Senior	Mt. Laurel, NJ	Walk-on; graduated
James Demery	25	F	6'6"	210	Senior	Greenville, NC	Graduated
Jai Williams	32	F	6'9"	235	RS Senior	Philadelphia, PA	Graduated

=== Incoming transfers ===
Name	Number	Pos.	Height	Weight	Year	Hometown	Previous School
Ryan Daly	1	G	6'5"	225	Junior	Ardmore, PA	Transferred from Delaware. Under NCAA transfer rules, Daly will sit out the 2018–19 season and will have two years of remaining eligibility.

=== 2018 recruiting class ===
College recruiting information
Name	Hometown	School	Height	Weight	Commit date
Jared Bynum #56 PG	Washington, D.C.	Georgetown Prep	5 ft 11 in (1.80 m)	150 lb (68 kg)	
Jared Bynum #56 PG	Recruit ratings: Scout: Rivals: 247Sports: ESPN: (77)				
Overall recruit ranking:
Note: In many cases, Scout, Rivals, 247Sports, On3, and ESPN may conflict in their listings of height and weight.; In these cases, the average was taken. ESPN grades are on a 100-point scale.; Sources: "Saint Joseph's Hawks". ESPN.; "2018 Team Ranking". Rivals.

== Roster ==
2018–19 Saint Joseph's Hawks men's basketball team
Players
Coaches

Pos.	#	Name	Height	Weight	Year	Previous school	Hometown
G	0	Lamarr Kimble	6 ft 0 in (1.83 m)	185 lb (84 kg)	RS Jr	Neumann-Goretti	Philadelphia, PA
G	1	Ryan Daly (redshirt)	6 ft 4 in (1.93 m)	226 lb (103 kg)	Jr	Archbishop John Carroll; Delaware	Ardmore, PA
F	2	Charlie Brown Jr.	6 ft 7 in (2.01 m)	197 lb (89 kg)	RS So	St. Thomas More School	Philadelphia, PA
G	3	Jared Bynum	5 ft 10 in (1.78 m)	172 lb (78 kg)	Fr	Georgetown Prep	Washington, D.C.
G	11	Toliver Freeman (W)	6 ft 3 in (1.91 m)	216 lb (98 kg)	Jr	Catholic	Baton Rouge, LA
F	12	Anthony Longpré	6 ft 10 in (2.08 m)	246 lb (112 kg)	So	Glenelg Country (MD)	L'Assomption, QE
G	15	Chris Clover	6 ft 3 in (1.91 m)	217 lb (98 kg)	Sr	St. Joseph's Prep	Philadelphia, PA
G	20	Mike Muggeo (W)	6 ft 3 in (1.91 m)	203 lb (92 kg)	Sr	Bergen Catholic	River Vale, NJ
F	21	Lorenzo Edwards	6 ft 7 in (2.01 m)	218 lb (99 kg)	RS So	Lake Forest	Lake Forest, IL
F	23	Markell Lodge	6 ft 7 in (2.01 m)	217 lb (98 kg)	RS Sr	Christian Faith Center Academy	Creedmoor, NC
F	24	Pierfrancesco Oliva	6 ft 8 in (2.03 m)	212 lb (96 kg)	RS Jr	Bergen Catholic	Taranto, Italy
F	33	Taylor Funk	6 ft 9 in (2.06 m)	232 lb (105 kg)	So	Manheim Central	Lancaster, PA

Head coach

- Phil Martelli (Widener)

Assistant coach(es)

- Mark Bass (Saint Joseph's)
- David Duda (Spring Garden)
- Geoff Arnold (Saint Joseph's)

Legend

- (C) Team captain
- (S) Suspended
- (I) Ineligible
- (W) Walk-on
- Injured
- Current redshirt

Roster

== Schedule and results ==
Date time, TV	Rank^{#}	Opponent^{#}	Result	Record	High points	High rebounds	High assists	Site (attendance) city, state
Regular season
November 9, 2018*; 7:30 pm		Old Dominion	W 79–64	1–0	20 – Brown Jr.	14 – Oliva	3 – Kimble	Hagan Arena (4,084); Philadelphia, PA
November 12, 2018*; 7:00 pm		Monmouth; Myrtle Beach Invitational Non-Bracketed Game	W 78–63	2–0	21 – Brown Jr.	10 – Oliva	5 – Tied	Hagan Arena (2,494); Philadelphia, PA
November 15, 2018*; 11:30 am, ESPNU		vs. Wake Forest; Myrtle Beach Invitational quarterfinals	W 89–69	3–0	26 – Brown Jr.	8 – Kimble	6 – Kimble	HTC Center (3,132); Conway, SC
November 16, 2018*; 1:00 pm, ESPN2		vs. UCF; Myrtle Beach Invitational semifinals	L 57–77	3–1	28 – Brown Jr.	6 – Tied	4 – Bynum	HTC Center; Conway, SC
November 18, 2018*; 4:00 pm, ESPNU		vs. West Virginia; Myrtle Beach Invitational 3rd place game	L 90–97	3–2	31 – Kimble	6 – Bynum	5 – Oliva	HTC Center (3,094); Conway, SC
November 24, 2018*; 4:00 pm		at William & Mary; A10–CAA Challenge	L 85–87	3–3	37 – Brown Jr.	12 – Oliva	7 – Funk	Kaplan Arena (2,878); Williamsburg, VA
November 28, 2018*; 7:00 pm		UIC	W 89–75	4–3	31 – Kimble	12 – Oliva	3 – Kimble	Hagan Arena (3,019); Philadelphia, PA
December 1, 2018*; 5:30 pm, NBCSN		Temple; Big 5/Rivalry	L 70–77	4–4	23 – Bynum	13 – Funk	5 – Bynum	Hagan Arena (4,200); Philadelphia, PA
December 5, 2018*; 7:00 pm		at Princeton	W 92–82	5–4	22 – Kimble	7 – Funk	6 – Bynum	Jadwin Gymnasium (1,668); Princeton, NJ
December 8, 2018*; 2:00 pm, FS1		at No. 21 Villanova; Big 5/Holy War	L 58–70	5–5	22 – Kimble	9 – Tied	4 – Tied	Finneran Pavilion (6,501); Villanova, PA
December 22, 2018*; 5:00 pm, CBSSN		vs. Loyola–Chicago	W 45–42	6–5	15 – Kimble	5 – Tied	2 – Oliva	Palestra (5,736); Philadelphia, PA
December 29, 2018*; 2:00 pm, ESPN+		Wagner	W 59–57	7–5	17 – Brown Jr.	7 – Brown Jr.	4 – Bynum	Hagan Arena (3,295); Philadelphia, PA
January 3, 2019; 7:30 pm, CBSSN		George Mason	L 60–85	7–6 (0–1)	17 – Tied	5 – Tied	3 – Tied	Hagan Arena (2,989); Philadelphia, PA
January 6, 2019; 2:00 pm, NBCSN		George Washington	L 56–70	7–7 (0–2)	20 – Brown Jr.	11 – Longpre	3 – Bynum	Hagan Arena (3,309); Philadelphia, PA
January 9, 2019; 7:00 pm, Stadium		at St. Bonaventure	L 47–73	7–8 (0–3)	16 – Kimble	6 – Longpre	2 – Kimble	Reilly Center (2,748); Olean, NY
January 12, 2019; 4:00 pm		at Duquesne	L 84–85	7–9 (0–4)	28 – Brown Jr.	8 – Longpre	8 – Bynum	A.J. Palumbo Center (2,829); Pittsburgh, PA
January 15, 2019; 9:00 pm, ESPNU		Davidson	W 61–60	8–9 (1–4)	18 – Clover	7 – Bynum	9 – Bynum	Hagan Arena (3,322); Philadelphia, PA
January 18, 2019; 7:00 pm, ESPN2		at Saint Louis	L 57–68	8–10 (1–5)	18 – Bynum	12 – Funk	8 – Bynum	Chaifetz Arena (7,852); St. Louis, MO
January 23, 2019; 7:00 pm		Richmond	W 74–70	9–10 (2–5)	31 – Brown Jr.	14 – Brown Jr.	4 – Bynum	Hagan Arena (3,088); Philadelphia, PA
January 26, 2019*; 7:00 pm		vs. Penn; Big 5	L 70–78	9–11	27 – Brown Jr.	12 – Brown Jr.	7 – Bynum	Palestra (8,173); Philadelphia, PA
January 30, 2019; 8:00 pm, CBSSN		at Dayton	L 64–75	9–12 (2–6)	21 – Clover	7 – Lodge	5 – Bynum	UD Arena (12,628); Dayton, OH
February 2, 2019; 4:30 pm, NBCSN		Massachusetts	W 64–62	10–12 (3–6)	20 – Brown Jr.	12 – Funk	4 – Bynum	Hagan Arena (3,691); Philadelphia, PA
February 5, 2019; 7:00 pm		at La Salle	L 69–83	10–13 (3–7)	22 – Edwards	4 – Edwards	5 – Brown Jr.	Tom Gola Arena (2,118); Philadelphia, PA
February 8, 2019; 7:00 pm, ESPN2		Saint Louis	W 91–61	11–13 (4–7)	28 – Brown Jr.	9 – Brown Jr.	6 – Bynum	Hagan Arena (2,784); Philadelphia, PA
February 12, 2019; 6:30 pm, CBSSN		St. Bonaventure	L 51–76	11–14 (4–8)	11 – Brown Jr.	9 – Edwards	3 – Brown Jr.	Hagan Arena (1,851); Philadelphia, PA
February 15, 2019; 7:00 pm, ESPN2		at Davidson	L 72–80	11–15 (4–9)	20 – Brown Jr.	10 – Clover	8 – Bynum	John M. Belk Arena (4,643); Davidson, NC
February 23, 2019; 2:30 pm		at Massachusetts	L 79–80	11–16 (4–10)	19 – Clover	4 – Clover	5 – Bynum	Mullins Center (3,967); Amherst, MA
February 27, 2019; 9:00 pm		at Fordham	W 66–52	12–16 (5–10)	20 – Brown Jr.	11 – Edwards	5 – Kimble	Rose Hill Gymnasium (1,533); Bronx, NY
March 2, 2019; 5:00 pm, NBCSN		La Salle	W 72–62	13–16 (6–10)	19 – Clover	5 – Bynum	4 – Bynum	Hagan Arena; Philadelphia, PA
March 5, 2019; 7:00 pm, CBSSN		Rhode Island	L 85–86 ^{OT}	13–17 (6–11)	19 – Bynum	9 – Clover	7 – Bynum	Hagan Arena; Philadelphia, PA
March 8, 2019; 9:00 pm, ESPN2		at VCU	L 63–75	13–18 (6–12)	15 – Brown Jr.	10 – Brown Jr.	5 – Bynum	Siegel Center (7,637); Richmond, VA
Atlantic 10 tournament
March 14, 2019; 6:00 pm, NBCSN	(10)	vs. (7) Duquesne; Second Round	W 92–86	14–18	28 – Brown Jr.	8 – Brown Jr.	6 – Kimble	Barclays Center (5,968); Brooklyn, NY
March 15, 2019; 6:00 pm, NBCSN	(10)	vs. (2) Davidson; Quarterfinals	L 60–70	14–19	16 – Brown Jr.	12 – Brown Jr.	4 – Kimble	Barclays Center (6,857); Brooklyn, NY
*Non-conference game. ^{#}Rankings from AP Poll. (#) Tournament seedings in parentheses. All times are in Eastern Time.
