= 2018–19 Fordham Rams men's basketball team =

American college basketball season

2018–19 Fordham Rams men's basketball

John Bach Classic Champions
- Conference: Atlantic 10
- Record: 12–20 (3–15 A-10)
- Head coach: Jeff Neubauer (4th season)
- Associate head coach: Rodney Crawford
- Assistant coaches: Ali Ton; Michael DePaoli
- Home arena: Rose Hill Gymnasium

2018–19 Atlantic 10 men's basketball standings
	Conf.				Overall
Team	W		L	PCT	W		L	PCT
VCU	16	–	2	.889	25	–	8	.758
Davidson	14	–	4	.778	24	–	10	.706
Dayton	13	–	5	.722	21	–	12	.636
St. Bonaventure	12	–	6	.667	18	–	16	.529
George Mason	11	–	7	.611	18	–	15	.545
Saint Louis †	10	–	8	.556	23	–	13	.639
Duquesne	10	–	8	.556	19	–	13	.594
Rhode Island	9	–	9	.500	18	–	15	.545
La Salle	8	–	10	.444	10	–	21	.323
Saint Joseph's	6	–	12	.333	14	–	19	.424
Richmond	6	–	12	.333	13	–	20	.394
George Washington	4	–	14	.222	9	–	24	.273
Massachusetts	4	–	14	.222	11	–	21	.344
Fordham	3	–	15	.167	12	–	20	.375
† 2019 Atlantic 10 tournament winner

The 2018–19 Fordham Rams men's basketball team represented Fordham University during the 2018–19 NCAA Division I men's basketball season. The Rams, led by fourth-year head coach Jeff Neubauer, played their home games at Rose Hill Gymnasium in The Bronx, New York as a member of the Atlantic 10 Conference. They finished the season 12-20, 3-15 in A-10 Play to finish in last place. They lost in the first round of the A-10 tournament to Richmond.

== Previous season ==
The Rams finished the 2017–18 season 9–22, 4–14 in A-10 play to finish in last place. They lost in the first round of the A-10 tournament to George Washington.

== Offseason ==
=== Departures ===
Name	Number	Pos.	Height	Weight	Year	Hometown	Reason for departure
Will Tavares	0	G	6'6"	205	Senior	Providence, RI	Graduated
Thomas Sanchez	2	G	5'9"	155	Senior	Maspeth, NY	Walk-on; graduated
Nemanja Zarkovic	3	G	6'3"	195	Senior	Montreal, QC	Graduated
Brenton Petty	4	G	5'9"	150	Senior	Washington, D.C.	Walk-on; graduated
Tre Evans	5	G	6'2"	185	Sophomore	Edmond, OK	Graduate transferred to Southwestern Oklahoma State
Joseph Chartouny	12	G	6'3"	205	Junior	Montreal, QC	Graduate transferred to Marquette
Cavit Havsa	15	G	6'4"	160	Sophomore	Istanbul, Turkey	Transferred to Utah Valley
Perris Hicks	23	G	6'1"	180	Senior	Los Angeles, CA	Graduated

=== 2018 recruiting class ===
College recruiting information
Name	Hometown	School	Height	Weight	Commit date
Nick Honor #32 PG	Orlando, FL	Lake Highland Prep	5 ft 10 in (1.78 m)	190 lb (86 kg)	Sep 27, 2017
Nick Honor #32 PG	Recruit ratings: Scout: Rivals: (80)				
Onyinyechi Eysi #58 C	Windsor, CA	Prolific Prep	6 ft 9 in (2.06 m)	200 lb (91 kg)	Feb 7, 2018
Onyinyechi Eysi #58 C	Recruit ratings: Scout: Rivals: (73)				
Chris Austin; SG	Pasadena, CA	Maranatha High School	6 ft 4 in (1.93 m)	195 lb (88 kg)	Oct 1, 2017
Chris Austin; SG	Recruit ratings: Scout: Rivals: (NR)				
Tyrone Perry; PG	Boston, MA	Woodstock Academy	6 ft 3 in (1.91 m)	N/A	Jan 28, 2018
Tyrone Perry; PG	Recruit ratings: Scout: Rivals: (NR)				
Jalen Cobb; PG	Decatur, GA	The Loomis Chaffee School	6 ft 0 in (1.83 m)	170 lb (77 kg)	Mar 11, 2018
Jalen Cobb; PG	Recruit ratings: Scout: Rivals: (NR)				
Lazar Škorić; SG	Belgrade, Serbia	None	6 ft 3 in (1.91 m)	190 lb (86 kg)	Mar 13, 2018
Lazar Škorić; SG	Recruit ratings: Scout: Rivals: (NR)				
Overall recruit ranking:
Note: In many cases, Scout, Rivals, 247Sports, On3, and ESPN may conflict in their listings of height and weight.; In these cases, the average was taken. ESPN grades are on a 100-point scale.; Sources: "2018 Team Ranking". Rivals.

=== 2019 recruiting class ===
College recruiting information (2019)
Name	Hometown	School	Height	Weight	Commit date
Joel Soriano; C	White Plains, NY	Archbishop Stepinac High School	6 ft 10 in (2.08 m)	190 lb (86 kg)	Apr 28, 2018
Joel Soriano; C	Recruit ratings: Scout: Rivals: (N/A)				
Overall recruit ranking:
Note: In many cases, Scout, Rivals, 247Sports, On3, and ESPN may conflict in their listings of height and weight.; In these cases, the average was taken. ESPN grades are on a 100-point scale.; Sources: "2019 Team Ranking". Rivals.

== Roster ==
2018–19 Fordham Rams men's basketball team
Players
Coaches

Pos.	#	Name	Height	Weight	Year	Previous school	Hometown
F	1	Chuba Ohams	6 ft 8 in (2.03 m)	205 lb (93 kg)	Jr	Wadleigh High School	Bronx, New York
G	2	Jalen Cobb	6 ft 0 in (1.83 m)	165 lb (75 kg)	Fr	Columbia High School	Atlanta, Georgia
G	3	Nick Honor	5 ft 10 in (1.78 m)	190 lb (86 kg)	Fr	Lake Highland Preparatory School	Orlando, Florida
G	4	Erten Gazi	6 ft 3 in (1.91 m)	205 lb (93 kg)	RS Jr	Istanbul Bostanci Doga College; DePaul	Güzelyurt, Cyprus
G	5	Chris Austin	6 ft 4 in (1.93 m)	195 lb (88 kg)	Fr	Maranatha High School	Pasadena, California
G	10	Ty Perry	6 ft 3 in (1.91 m)	190 lb (86 kg)	Fr	Woodstock Academy	Boston, Massachusetts
F	12	Luka Radovich (W)	6 ft 5 in (1.96 m)	200 lb (91 kg)	Fr	Cresskill High School	Cresskill, New Jersey
G	13	Antwon Portley	6 ft 4 in (1.93 m)	195 lb (88 kg)	RS Jr	Lancaster High School; Saint Peter's	Lancaster, Texas
F	14	Chris Downing	6 ft 8 in (2.03 m)	235 lb (107 kg)	Sr	Don Bosco Prep	Orangeburg, New York
G	15	Mason Williams (W)	6 ft 3 in (1.91 m)	175 lb (79 kg)	Fr	William Penn Charter School	Philadelphia, Pennsylvania
F	20	Ivan Raut	6 ft 7 in (2.01 m)	204 lb (93 kg)	So	None	Kotor, Montenegro
F	21	Jesse Bunting	6 ft 8 in (2.03 m)	225 lb (102 kg)	Sr	Tabor Academy	Plymouth, Massachusetts
G	22	Peter Burquest (W)	6 ft 1 in (1.85 m)	165 lb (75 kg)	So	St. Xavier High School	Cincinnati, Ohio
G	23	Lazar Skoric	6 ft 3 in (1.91 m)	190 lb (86 kg)	Fr		Belgrade, Serbia
F	24	Prokop Slanina	6 ft 10 in (2.08 m)	225 lb (102 kg)	Sr	ASA College	Brno, Czech Republic
F	30	Onyi Eyisi	6 ft 7 in (2.01 m)	210 lb (95 kg)	Fr	Prolific Prep Academy	Napa Valley, CA
F	33	David Pekárek	6 ft 7 in (2.01 m)	210 lb (95 kg)	Sr	Get Better Academy	Olomouc, Czech Republic

Head coach

- Jeff Neubauer (La Salle)

Assistant coach(es)

- Rodney Crawford (Cincinnati)
- Ali Ton (Davidson)
- Michael DePaoli (College of Saint Rose)

Legend

- (C) Team captain
- (S) Suspended
- (I) Ineligible
- (W) Walk-on
- Injured
- Current redshirt

Roster

== Schedule and results ==
Date time, TV	Rank^{#}	Opponent^{#}	Result	Record	Site (attendance) city, state
Non-conference regular season
November 6, 2018*; 7:00 pm		CCNY; John Bach Classic	W 106–58	1–0	Rose Hill Gymnasium (1,740); Bronx, NY
November 10, 2018*; 8:00 pm		at Houston Baptist	L 72–75	1–1	Sharp Gymnasium (748); Houston, TX
November 16, 2018*; 6:00 pm		FIU; John Bach Classic	W 83–77	2–1	Rose Hill Gymnasium (1,765); Bronx, NY
November 17, 2018*; 3:30 pm		Youngstown State; John Bach Classic	W 67–61	3–1	Rose Hill Gymnasium (1,834); Bronx, NY
November 18, 2018*; 5:00 pm		Columbia; John Bach Classic	W 70–69	4–1	Rose Hill Gymnasium (1,917); Bronx, NY
November 25, 2018*; 2:00 pm		Alabama A&M	W 77–46	5–1	Rose Hill Gymnasium (1,444); Bronx, NY
December 1, 2018*; 7:00 pm		at Manhattan; Battle of the Bronx	W 57–56	6–1	Draddy Gymnasium (2,023); Riverdale, NY
December 4, 2018*; 7:00 pm		at Maine	L 68–75 ^{2OT}	6–2	Cross Insurance Center (1,036); Bangor, ME
December 8, 2018*; 2:30 pm, CBSSN		Rutgers	W 78–70	7–2	Rose Hill Gymnasium (2,346); Bronx, NY
December 11, 2018*; 8:00 pm		NJIT	L 50–53	7–3	Rose Hill Gymnasium (1,766); Bronx, NY
December 16, 2018*; 2:00 pm		Howard	W 74–67	8–3	Rose Hill Gymnasium (1,907); Bronx, NY
December 20, 2018*; 7:00 pm		James Madison	W 75–48	9–3	Rose Hill Gymnasium (1,606); Bronx, NY
December 30, 2018*; 7:00 pm, ESPN+		LIU Brooklyn	L 57–60	9–4	Rose Hill Gymnasium (1,538); Bronx, NY
Atlantic 10 regular season
January 5, 2019; 2:00 pm, ESPN+		VCU	L 51–76	9–5 (0–1)	Rose Hill Gymnasium (1,723); Bronx, NY
January 9, 2019; 8:00 pm		at Duquesne	L 61–66	9–6 (0–2)	Palumbo Center (2,211); Pittsburgh, PA
January 12, 2019; 4:30 pm		vs. St. Bonaventure; Roc City Hoops Classic	L 64–71	9–7 (0–3)	Blue Cross Arena (4,914); Rochester, NY
January 15, 2019; 7:00 pm		Saint Louis	L 60–63	9–8 (0–4)	Rose Hill Gymnasium (1,778); Bronx, NY
January 19, 2019; 7:00 pm		at George Mason	L 68–71	9–9 (0–5)	EagleBank Arena (3,892); Fairfax, VA
January 23, 2019; 7:00 pm		La Salle	L 71–73	9–10 (0–6)	Rose Hill Gymnasium (1,731); Bronx, NY
January 26, 2019; 2:00 pm, ESPN+		Dayton	L 52–75	9–11 (0–7)	Rose Hill Gymnasium (3,200); Bronx, NY
January 30, 2019; 7:00 pm, Stadium		at George Washington	L 61–79	9–12 (0–8)	Charles E. Smith Center (1,922); Washington, D.C.
February 6, 2019; 7:00 pm		at Massachusetts	W 85–67	10–12 (1–8)	Mullins Center (2,921); Amherst, MA
February 9, 2019; 2:00 pm		Duquesne	L 66–74	10–13 (1–9)	Rose Hill Gymnasium (1,477); Bronx, NY
February 12, 2019; 7:00 pm		Davidson	L 69–79	10–14 (1–10)	Rose Hill Gymnasium (1,813); Bronx, NY
February 16, 2019; 2:00 pm, NBCSN		at Rhode Island	W 66–63 ^{OT}	11–14 (2–10)	Ryan Center (6,258); Kingston, RI
February 20, 2019; 7:00 pm		at Richmond	L 69–72	11–15 (2–11)	Robins Center (5,001); Richmond, VA
February 23, 2019; 4:30 pm, NBCSN		St. Bonaventure	L 53–74	11–16 (2–12)	Rose Hill Gymnasium (2,387); Bronx, NY
February 27, 2019; 9:00 pm		Saint Joseph's	L 52–66	11–17 (2–13)	Rose Hill Gymnasium (1,533); Bronx, NY
March 2, 2019; 1:00 pm, Stadium		at Davidson	L 52–77	11–18 (2–14)	John M. Belk Arena (4,447); Davidson, NC
March 6, 2019; 7:00 pm, ESPN+		George Washington	W 67–56	12–18 (3–14)	Rose Hill Gymnasium (1,914); Bronx, NY
March 9, 2019; 4:00 pm, ESPN+		at La Salle	L 57–72	12–19 (3–15)	Tom Gola Arena (1,652); Philadelphia, PA
Atlantic 10 tournament
March 13, 2019; 3:30 pm, ESPN+	(14)	vs. (11) Richmond; First Round	L 50–52	12–20	Barclays Center (4,278); Brooklyn, NY
*Non-conference game. ^{#}Rankings from AP Poll. (#) Tournament seedings in parentheses. All times are in Eastern Time.

== See also ==
- 2018–19 Fordham Rams women's basketball team
