= 2018–19 VCU Rams men's basketball team =

American college basketball season

2018–19 VCU Rams men's basketball

Atlantic 10 regular season champions

NCAA tournament, First Round
- Conference: Atlantic 10 Conference
- Record: 25–8 (16–2 A-10)
- Head coach: Mike Rhoades (2nd season)
- Assistant coaches: J. D. Byers; Brent Scott; Jamal Brunt
- Home arena: Stuart C. Siegel Center

2018–19 Atlantic 10 men's basketball standings
| | Conf. | | | | Overall |
| Team | W | | L | PCT | W | | L | PCT |
|---|---|---|---|---|---|---|---|---|
| VCU | 16 | – | 2 | .889 | 25 | – | 8 | .758 |
| Davidson | 14 | – | 4 | .778 | 24 | – | 10 | .706 |
| Dayton | 13 | – | 5 | .722 | 21 | – | 12 | .636 |
| St. Bonaventure | 12 | – | 6 | .667 | 18 | – | 16 | .529 |
| George Mason | 11 | – | 7 | .611 | 18 | – | 15 | .545 |
| Saint Louis † | 10 | – | 8 | .556 | 23 | – | 13 | .639 |
| Duquesne | 10 | – | 8 | .556 | 19 | – | 13 | .594 |
| Rhode Island | 9 | – | 9 | .500 | 18 | – | 15 | .545 |
| La Salle | 8 | – | 10 | .444 | 10 | – | 21 | .323 |
| Saint Joseph's | 6 | – | 12 | .333 | 14 | – | 19 | .424 |
| Richmond | 6 | – | 12 | .333 | 13 | – | 20 | .394 |
| George Washington | 4 | – | 14 | .222 | 9 | – | 24 | .273 |
| Massachusetts | 4 | – | 14 | .222 | 11 | – | 21 | .344 |
| Fordham | 3 | – | 15 | .167 | 12 | – | 20 | .375 |
† 2019 Atlantic 10 tournament winner

The 2018–19 VCU Rams men's basketball team represented Virginia Commonwealth University during the 2018–19 NCAA Division I men's basketball season. The Rams were led by Mike Rhoades in his second season as head coach at VCU. The Rams played their home games at Stuart C. Siegel Center in Richmond, Virginia as members of the Atlantic 10 Conference. They finished the season 25–8, 16–2 in A-10 Play to finish in 1st place. In the quarterfinals of the A-10 tournament, they were upset by Rhode Island. They received an at-large bid to the NCAA tournament where they lost in the first round to UCF.

== Background ==
The previous season was Mike Rhoades' first season as head coach. The Rams finished the 2017–18 season 18–15, 9–9 in A-10 play to finish tied for fifth place. VCU defeated Dayton in the A-10 Tournament to advance to the quarterfinals, where they lost to Rhode Island. The Rams, for the first time since 2010 failed to earn an at-large bid into the NCAA Tournament or NIT. The Rams had been invited to play in the CBI and CIT tournaments, but declined. It was the first time since 2006 the Rams failed to have a 20-win season, and the first time since that same year the Rams did not play in a postseason tournament.

== Offseason ==
=== Departures ===
| Name | Number | Pos. | Height | Weight | Year | Hometown | Notes |
|---|---|---|---|---|---|---|---|
| Justin Tillman | 4 | F | 6'7" | 220 | Senior | Detroit, Michigan | Graduated |
| Jonathan Williams | 10 | G | 6'1" | 200 | Senior | Richmond, Virginia | Graduated |
| Khris Lane | 21 | G | 6'7" | 245 | RS Senior | Richmond, Virginia | Graduated |
| Tyler Maye | 25 | G | 6'1" | 175 | Freshman | Farmville, North Carolina | Transferred to Southeastern CC |
| Lewis Djonkam | 22 | F | 6'9" | 245 | Freshman | Springfield, Virginia | Transferred to Radford |

=== Transfers ===
| Name | Number | Pos. | Height | Weight | Year | Hometown | Notes |
|---|---|---|---|---|---|---|---|
| Marcus Evans | 2 | G | 6'2" | 195 | Junior | Chesapeake, Virginia | Transferred from Rice. |
| Corey Douglas Jr. | 4 | F | 6'8" | 215 | RS Sophomore | Louisville, Kentucky | Transferred from Tallahassee Community College. |
| Michael Gillmore | 22 | F | 6'10" | 210 | RS Senior | Jacksonville, Florida | Transferred from Florida Gulf Coast. |

=== 2018 recruiting class ===
College recruiting information
| Name | Hometown | School | Height | Weight | Commit date |
|---|---|---|---|---|---|
| P. J. Byrd; PG | Houston, TX | George Bush High School | 6 ft 1 in (1.85 m) | 169 lb (77 kg) | Sep 6, 2017 |
| P. J. Byrd; PG | Recruit ratings: Scout: Rivals: 247Sports: (NR) | | | | |
| KeShawn Curry; SG | Jacksonville, FL | Fork Union Military Academy | 6 ft 4 in (1.93 m) | 180 lb (82 kg) | Oct 2, 2017 |
| KeShawn Curry; SG | Recruit ratings: Scout: Rivals: 247Sports: (NR) | | | | |
| Vince Williams Jr. SF | Toledo, OH | St. John's Jesuit | 6 ft 5 in (1.96 m) | 204 lb (93 kg) | Oct 4, 2017 |
| Vince Williams Jr. SF | Recruit ratings: Scout: Rivals: 247Sports: (80) | | | | |
Overall recruit ranking:
Note: In many cases, Scout, Rivals, 247Sports, On3, and ESPN may conflict in their listings of height and weight.; In these cases, the average was taken. ESPN grades are on a 100-point scale.; Sources: "VCU 2018 Player Commits". ESPN.; "2018 Team Ranking". Rivals.

== Honors and awards ==
=== Preseason Awards ===
Street & Smith's

- All-Newcomer - Marcus Evans
- All-Sharpshooter - De'Riante Jenkins

Athlon Sports

- All-Atlantic 10 First Team - Marcus Evans

== Roster ==
2018–19 VCU Rams men's basketball team
Players
Coaches

| Pos. | # | Name | Height | Weight | Year | Previous school | Hometown |
|---|---|---|---|---|---|---|---|
| G | 0 | De'Riante Jenkins | 6 ft 5 in (1.96 m) | 195 lb (88 kg) | Jr | Hargrave Military Academy | Eutawville, South Carolina |
| G/F | 1 | Mike'L Simms | 6 ft 5 in (1.96 m) | 210 lb (95 kg) | RS Jr | Cowley Community College | Richmond, Virginia |
| G | 2 | Marcus Evans | 6 ft 2 in (1.88 m) | 190 lb (86 kg) | RS Jr | Rice | Chesapeake, Virginia |
| F | 4 | Corey Douglas Jr. | 6 ft 8 in (2.03 m) | 215 lb (98 kg) | RS So | Ballard (Louisville); Tallahassee Community College | Louisville, Kentucky |
| F | 5 | Sean Mobley | 6 ft 8 in (2.03 m) | 225 lb (102 kg) | So | Montverde Academy | Melbourne, Florida |
| G/F | 10 | Vince Williams Jr. | 6 ft 6 in (1.98 m) | 210 lb (95 kg) | Fr | St. John's Jesuit | Toledo, Ohio |
| G | 11 | KeShawn Curry | 6 ft 4 in (1.93 m) | 175 lb (79 kg) | Fr | Fork Union Military Academy | Jacksonville, Florida |
| G | 12 | Dylan Sheehy-Guiseppi (W) | 6 ft 1 in (1.85 m) | 195 lb (88 kg) | So | St. Francis Prep | Lake Havasu City, Arizona |
| G | 13 | Malik Crowfield | 6 ft 4 in (1.93 m) | 195 lb (88 kg) | Jr | Riverside Academy | LaPlace, Louisiana |
| F | 14 | Marcus Santos-Silva | 6 ft 7 in (2.01 m) | 250 lb (113 kg) | So | Vermont Academy | Taunton, Massachusetts |
| G | 15 | Xavier Jackson | 6 ft 3 in (1.91 m) | 190 lb (86 kg) | Sr | Sheridan College | Hinesville, Georgia |
| F | 22 | Michael Gillmore | 6 ft 10 in (2.08 m) | 210 lb (95 kg) | RS Sr | Florida Gulf Coast | Jacksonville, Florida |
| F | 23 | Issac Vann | 6 ft 6 in (1.98 m) | 210 lb (95 kg) | RS Jr | Maine | Bridgeport, Connecticut |
| G | 24 | P. J. Byrd | 6 ft 1 in (1.85 m) | 185 lb (84 kg) | Fr | George Bush High School | Houston, Texas |

Head coach

- Mike Rhoades (Lebanon Valley)

Assistant coach(es)

- J. D. Byers (Lebanon Valley)
- Brent Scott (Rice)
- Jamal Brunt (Randolph–Macon)

Legend

- (C) Team captain
- (S) Suspended
- (I) Ineligible
- (W) Walk-on
- Injured
- Current redshirt

Roster

== Schedule and results ==
| Date time, TV | Rank^{#} | Opponent^{#} | Result | Record | High points | High rebounds | High assists | Site (attendance) city, state |
Exhibition
| October 30, 2018*; 7:00 pm | | Virginia–Wise | W 87–41 | | 15 – Curry | 10 – Tied | 4 – Jenkins | Siegel Center (5,040); Richmond, VA |
Non-conference regular season
| November 6, 2018*; 7:00 pm, MASN | | Gardner–Webb | W 69–57 | 1–0 | 16 – Vann | 8 – Vann | 4 – Byrd | Siegel Center (7,637); Richmond, VA |
| November 9, 2018*; 7:00 pm, MASN | | Hampton; Legends Classic campus-site game | W 69–57 | 2–0 | 16 – Santos-Silva | 7 – Gilmore | 3 – Tied | Siegel Center (7,637); Richmond, VA |
| November 12, 2018*; 7:00 pm, MASN | | Bowling Green; Legends Classic campus-site game | W 72–61 | 3–0 | 12 – Williams | 9 – Douglas | 3 – Evans | Siegel Center (7,637); Richmond, VA |
| November 19, 2018*; 9:30 pm, ESPN3 | | vs. Temple; Legends Classic semifinals | W 57–51 | 4–0 | 21 – Evans | 7 – Mobley | 3 – Simms | Barclays Center (5,967); Brooklyn, NY |
| November 20, 2018*; 7:30 pm, ESPN2 | | vs. St. John's; Legends Classic championship | L 86–87 ^{OT} | 4–1 | 30 – Vann | 12 – Santos-Silva | 5 – Vann | Barclays Center (5,453); Brooklyn, NY |
| November 24, 2018*; 7:00 pm, MASN | | Hofstra; A10–CAA Challenge | W 69–67 ^{OT} | 5–1 | 19 – Jenkins | 8 – Tied | 5 – Evans | Siegel Center (7,637); Richmond, VA |
| November 28, 2018*; 7:00 pm, MASN | | at Old Dominion; Rivalry | L 52–62 | 5–2 | 14 – Evans | 7 – Santos-Silva | 3 – Jenkins | Ted Constant Center (8,172); Norfolk, VA |
| December 1, 2018*; 7:00 pm, MASN | | Iona | W 88–59 | 6–2 | 19 – Evans | 9 – Santos-Silva | 3 – Tied | Siegel Center (7,637); Richmond, VA |
| December 5, 2018*; 8:00 pm, ESPNU | | at Texas | W 54–53 | 7–2 | 16 – Evans | 16 – Santos-Silva | 3 – Evans | Frank Erwin Center (8,190); Austin, TX |
| December 9, 2018*; 1:30 pm, ACCRSN | | at No. 4 Virginia | L 49–57 | 7–3 | 10 – Vann | 10 – Santos-Silva | 3 – Vann | John Paul Jones Arena (13,648); Charlottesville, VA |
| December 15, 2018*; 4:00 pm, NBCSN | | Charleston | L 79–83 | 7–4 | 23 – Jenkins | 12 – Santos-Silva | 4 – Vann | Siegel Center (7,637); Richmond, VA |
| December 22, 2018*; 4:00 pm, ESPN2 | | Wichita State | W 70–54 | 8–4 | 18 – Vann | 6 – Jenkins | 5 – Evans | Siegel Center (7,637); Richmond, VA |
| December 30, 2018*; 2:00 pm, MASN | | Rider | W 90–79 | 9–4 | 15 – Simms | 6 – Douglas | 6 – Jenkins | Siegel Center (7,637); Richmond, VA |
Atlantic 10 regular season
| January 5, 2019; 2:00 pm, WTVR | | at Fordham | W 76–51 | 10–4 (1–0) | 17 – Evans | 4 – Tied | 3 – Tied | Rose Hill Gymnasium (1,723); Bronx, NY |
| January 9, 2019; 7:00 pm, MASN | | La Salle | W 69–63 | 11–4 (2–0) | 15 – Jenkins | 8 – Evans | 3 – Crowfield | Siegel Center (7,637); Richmond, VA |
| January 12, 2019; 2:00 pm, CBSSN | | at Davidson | L 57–64 | 11–5 (2–1) | 16 – Evans | 7 – Evans | 2 – Evans | John M. Belk Arena (4,556); Davidson, NC |
| January 16, 2019; 8:00 pm, CBSSN | | Dayton | W 76–71 | 12–5 (3–1) | 17 – Evans | 7 – Jenkins | 4 – Vann | Siegel Center (7,637); Richmond, VA |
| January 19, 2019; 6:30 pm, NBCSN | | UMass | W 68–50 | 13–5 (4–1) | 17 – Jenkins | 7 – Jenkins | 6 – Evans | Siegel Center (7,637); Richmond, VA |
| January 23, 2019; 7:00 pm, CBSSN | | at Rhode Island | L 65–71 | 13–6 (4–2) | 17 – Santos-Silva | 7 – Santos-Silva | 6 – Evans | Ryan Center (5,874); Kingston, RI |
| January 26, 2019; 2:00 pm, MASN | | at Duquesne | W 80–74 | 14–6 (5–2) | 22 – Evans | 12 – Santos-Silva | 4 – Vann | Palumbo Center (3,706); Pittsburgh, PA |
| February 2, 2019; 6:30 pm, NBCSN | | George Mason; Rivalry | W 79–63 | 15–6 (6–2) | 21 – Vann | 7 – Jenkins | 5 – Evans | Siegel Center (7,637); Richmond, VA |
| February 6, 2019; 7:00 pm, MASN | | at George Washington | W 60–50 | 16–6 (7–2) | 14 – Jenkins | 11 – Santos-Silva | 4 – Evans | Charles E. Smith Center (2,959); Washington, D.C. |
| February 9, 2019; 2:00 pm, CBSSN | | at St. Bonaventure | W 85–55 | 17–6 (8–2) | 12 – Mobley | 9 – Gilmore | 4 – Evans | Reilly Center (5,382); Olean, NY |
| February 13, 2019; 7:00 pm, ESPNU | | Richmond; Capital City Classic | W 80–61 | 18–6 (9–2) | 16 – Tied | 9 – Douglas | 5 – Evans | Siegel Center (7,637); Richmond, VA |
| February 16, 2019; 4:00 pm, NBCSN | | at Dayton | W 69–68 | 19–6 (10–2) | 19 – Jenkins | 6 – Evans | 4 – Vann | UD Arena (13,147); Dayton, OH |
| February 19, 2019; 8:00 pm, CBSSN | | Rhode Island | W 76–42 | 20–6 (11–2) | 19 – Santos-Silva | 12 – Santos-Silva | 9 – Evans | Siegel Center (7,637); Richmond, VA |
| February 23, 2019; 2:00 pm, WTVR | | George Washington | W 85–57 | 21–6 (12–2) | 25 – Evans | 7 – Santos-Silva | 4 – Jenkins | Siegel Center (7,637); Richmond, VA |
| February 26, 2019; 7:30 pm, CBSSN | | Saint Louis | W 71–65 | 22–6 (13–2) | 20 – Evans | 5 – Williams | 4 – Tied | Siegel Center (7,637); Richmond, VA |
| March 2, 2019; 4:00 pm, CBBSN | | at Richmond; Capital City Classic | W 69–66 | 23–6 (14–2) | 15 – Evans | 6 – Evans | 5 – Evans | Robins Center (7,201); Richmond, VA |
| March 5, 2019; 7:30 pm, Stadium | | at George Mason; Rivalry | W 71–36 | 24–6 (15–2) | 13 – Evans | 9 – Santos-Silva | 2 – Evans | EagleBank Arena (6,177); Fairfax, VA |
| March 8, 2019; 9:00 pm, ESPN2 | | Saint Joseph's | W 75–63 | 25–6 (16–2) | 23 – Evans | 9 – Santos-Silva | 4 – Tied | Siegel Center (7,637); Richmond, VA |
Atlantic 10 tournament
| March 15, 2019; 12:00 pm, NBCSN | (1) | vs. (8) Rhode Island; Quarterfinals | L 70–75 | 25–7 | 26 – Santos-Silva | 22 – Santos-Silva | 5 – Jenkins | Barclays Center (7,194); Brooklyn, NY |
NCAA tournament
| March 22, 2019; 9:40 pm, CBS | (8 E) | vs. (9 E) UCF; First Round | L 58–73 | 25–8 | 11 – Crowfield | 6 – Evans | 2 – Vann | Colonial Life Arena (16,219); Columbia, SC |
*Non-conference game. ^{#}Rankings from AP Poll. (#) Tournament seedings in parentheses. E=East. All times are in Eastern Time.
