= 2018–19 Saint Louis Billikens men's basketball team =

American college basketball season

2018–19 Saint Louis Billikens men's basketball
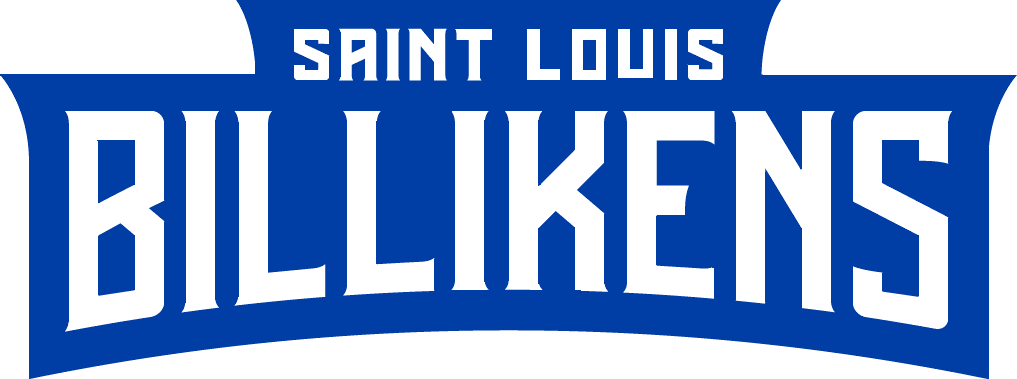

Atlantic 10 Tournament champions

NCAA tournament, First Round
- Conference: Atlantic 10 Conference
- Record: 23–13 (10–8 A-10)
- Head coach: Travis Ford (3rd season)
- Associate head coach: Van Macon
- Assistant coaches: Will Bailey; Corey Tate
- Home arena: Chaifetz Arena

2018–19 Atlantic 10 men's basketball standings
	Conf.				Overall
Team	W		L	PCT	W		L	PCT
VCU	16	–	2	.889	25	–	8	.758
Davidson	14	–	4	.778	24	–	10	.706
Dayton	13	–	5	.722	21	–	12	.636
St. Bonaventure	12	–	6	.667	18	–	16	.529
George Mason	11	–	7	.611	18	–	15	.545
Saint Louis †	10	–	8	.556	23	–	13	.639
Duquesne	10	–	8	.556	19	–	13	.594
Rhode Island	9	–	9	.500	18	–	15	.545
La Salle	8	–	10	.444	10	–	21	.323
Saint Joseph's	6	–	12	.333	14	–	19	.424
Richmond	6	–	12	.333	13	–	20	.394
George Washington	4	–	14	.222	9	–	24	.273
Massachusetts	4	–	14	.222	11	–	21	.344
Fordham	3	–	15	.167	12	–	20	.375
† 2019 Atlantic 10 tournament winner

The 2018–19 Saint Louis Billikens men's basketball team represented Saint Louis University in the 2018–19 NCAA Division I men's basketball season. Their head coach was Travis Ford in his third season at Saint Louis. The team played their home games at Chaifetz Arena as a member of the Atlantic 10 Conference. They finished the season 23–13, 10–8 in A-10 play to finish in a tie for sixth place. They defeated Richmond, Dayton, Davidson and St. Bonaventure to be champions of the A-10 tournament. They received the A-10's automatic bid to the NCAA tournament where they lost in the first round to Virginia Tech.

== Previous season ==
The Billikens finished the 2017–18 season 17–16, 9–9 in A-10 play to finish in a four-way tie for fifth place. As the No. 6 seed in the A-10 tournament, they defeated George Washington in the second round before losing to Davidson in the quarterfinals.

== Offseason ==
=== Departures ===
Name	Number	Pos.	Height	Weight	Year	Hometown	Reason for departure
Davell Roby	5	G	6'4"	200	Senior	Memphis TN	Graduated
Jalen Johnson	20	F	6'7"	210	Sophomore	Baton Rouge, LA	Transferred to Louisiana-Lafayette
Markos Psimitis	21	G	6'5"	205	Redshirt Junior	Mytilene, Greece	Walk On; Graduated
Aaron Hines	24	G	6'0"	180	Senior	St. Louis, MO	Graduated
Rashed Anthony	25	C	6'9"	230	Graduate Student	Orangeburg, SC	Graduated
Luis Santos	42	C	6'8"	250	Junior	Santiago, Dominican Republic	Withdrew - 9/25/2018

=== Incoming transfers ===
Name	Number	Pos.	Height	Weight	Year	Hometown	Previous School
Tramaine Isabell Jr.	2	G	6'1"	180	Senior	Seatlle, WA	Transferred from Drexel. Graduate Transfer, eligible immediately
Dion Wiley	4	G	6'4"	210	Senior	Oxon Hill, MD	Transferred from Maryland. Graduate Transfer, eligible immediately

=== 2018 recruiting class ===
College recruiting information
Name	Hometown	School	Height	Weight	Commit date
Carte'Are Gordon; PF	St. Louis, MO	Webster Groves High School	6 ft 9 in (2.06 m)	230 lb (100 kg)	Aug 26, 2016
Carte'Are Gordon; PF	Recruit ratings: Scout: Rivals: 247Sports: (91)				
Fred Thatch; SG	Sikeston, MO	Sikeston High School	6 ft 3 in (1.91 m)	210 lb (95 kg)	Jan 12, 2017
Fred Thatch; SG	Recruit ratings: Scout: Rivals: 247Sports: (79)				
Mickey Pearson; SF	Elizabethtown, KY	John Hardin High School	6 ft 7 in (2.01 m)	180 lb (82 kg)	Oct 14, 2017 - released June 19, 2018
Mickey Pearson; SF	Recruit ratings: Scout: Rivals: 247Sports: (N/A)				
Demarius Jacobs; SG	Chicago, IL	Hillcrest Prep Academy	6 ft 2 in (1.88 m)	175 lb (79 kg)	Feb 25, 2018
Demarius Jacobs; SG	Recruit ratings: Scout: Rivals: 247Sports: (N/A)				
Ingvi Þór Guðmundsson; SG	Grindavík, Iceland	Fjölbrautaskóli Suðurnesja	6 ft 4 in (1.93 m)	180 lb (82 kg)	Apr 11, 2018
Ingvi Þór Guðmundsson; SG	Recruit ratings: Scout: Rivals: 247Sports: (N/A)				
KC Hankton; SF	Charlotte, NC	United Faith Christian Academy	6 ft 7 in (2.01 m)	205 lb (93 kg)	May 31, 2018
KC Hankton; SF	Recruit ratings: Scout: Rivals: 247Sports: (N/A)				
Overall recruit ranking:
Note: In many cases, Scout, Rivals, 247Sports, On3, and ESPN may conflict in their listings of height and weight.; In these cases, the average was taken. ESPN grades are on a 100-point scale.; Sources:

== Preseason ==
At the Atlantic 10 Media Day, the Billikens was picked to win the Atlantic 10 in the league's annual preseason poll. Also, senior guard Javon Bess and sophomore guard Jordan Goodwin were named preseason second-team All-Conference, while sophomore forward Hasahn French was named to the third team. Bess landed on the league's preseason All-Defensive team as well.

== Roster ==
On January 3, 2019, after appearing in 13 games, Carte'Are Gordon was granted his release from his scholarship and left the team. After appearing in two games, Ingvi Þór Guðmundsson withdrew from school and left the team on January 21, 2019.

2018–19 Saint Louis Billikens men's basketball team
Players
Coaches

Pos.	#	Name	Height	Weight	Year	Previous school	Hometown
G	0	Jordan Goodwin (C)	6 ft 3 in (1.91 m)	210 lb (95 kg)	So	Althoff Catholic	Centreville, Il
F	1	D. J. Foreman	6 ft 8 in (2.03 m)	240 lb (109 kg)	RS Sr	Massanutten Academy; Rutgers	Spring Valley, NY
G	2	Tramaine Isabell	6 ft 1 in (1.85 m)	180 lb (82 kg)	GS	Garfield; Drexel/Missouri	Seatlle, WA
G	3	Javon Bess (C)	6 ft 6 in (1.98 m)	220 lb (100 kg)	GS	Gahanna Lincoln; Michigan State	Columbus, OH
G	4	Dion Wiley	6 ft 4 in (1.93 m)	210 lb (95 kg)	GS	Potomac; Maryland	Oxon Hill, MD
F	11	Hasahn French (C)	6 ft 7 in (2.01 m)	235 lb (107 kg)	So	Commonwealth Academy	Middletown, NY
G	12	Brandon Courtney (W)	6 ft 3 in (1.91 m)	175 lb (79 kg)	Fr	Wesclin	Trenton, IL
G	15	Demarius Jacobs	6 ft 2 in (1.88 m)	175 lb (79 kg)	Fr	Uplift	Chicago, IL
G	20	Fred Thatch Jr.	6 ft 3 in (1.91 m)	210 lb (95 kg)	Fr	Sikeston	Sikeston, MO
F	23	KC Hankton	6 ft 7 in (2.01 m)	205 lb (93 kg)	Fr	United Faith Christian Academy	Charlotte, NC
G	30	Joshua Hightower (W)	6 ft 3 in (1.91 m)	185 lb (84 kg)	So	Glenelg Country; ASA College	Cooksville, MD
G	31	Jack Raboin (W)	6 ft 6 in (1.98 m)	205 lb (93 kg)	RS Jr	Mattoon; Lake Land College	Mattoon, IL
F	33	Elliott Welmer (injured)	6 ft 9 in (2.06 m)	220 lb (100 kg)	RS So	Bridgton Academy	Columbus, IN

Head coach

- Travis Ford (Kentucky)

Assistant coach(es)

- Van Macon (Southampton)
- Will Bailey (UAB)
- Corey Tate (Missouri)

Legend

- (C) Team captain
- (S) Suspended
- (I) Ineligible
- (W) Walk-on
- Injured
- Current redshirt

== Schedule and results ==
Date time, TV	Rank^{#}	Opponent^{#}	Result	Record	High points	High rebounds	High assists	Site (attendance) city, state
Exhibition
October 27, 2018*; 7:00 pm		Quincy	W 85–42		19 – Isabell Jr.	9 – Gordon	7 – Isabell Jr.	Chaifetz Arena; St. Louis, MO
November 1, 2018*; 7:00 pm		UMSL	W 71–49		19 – French	11 – Goodwin	4 – Tied	Chaifetz Arena; St. Louis, MO
Non-conference Regular season
November 6, 2018*; 7:00 pm, FSMW+		Southeast Missouri State	W 75–65	1–0	18 – Tied	12 – French	4 – French	Chaifetz Arena (6,028); St. Louis, MO
November 10, 2018*; 7:00 pm, FSMW		Troy; Barclays Center Classic	W 62–58	2–0	16 – Isabell Jr.	9 – Goodwin	5 – Tied	Chaifetz Arena (6,523); St. Louis, MO
November 13, 2018*; 7:00 pm, FSMW		North Alabama; Barclays Center Classic	W 69–58	3–0	16 – Bess	10 – Bess	5 – Foreman	Chaifetz Arena (4,972); St. Louis, MO
November 17, 2018*; 7:00 pm, FS2		at Seton Hall	W 66–64	4–0	17 – Wiley	13 – Bess	3 – Goodwin	Prudential Center (7,854); Newark, NJ
November 21, 2018*; 11:00 am, ACCN Extra		vs. Pittsburgh; Barclays Center Classic	L 73–75	4–1	16 – Goodwin	10 – French	4 – Goodwin	Barclays Center (355); Brooklyn, NY
November 24, 2018*; 3:00 pm, FSMW		Central Arkansas; Barclays Center Classic	W 73–61	5–1	19 – Bess	9 – Gordon	6 – Goodwin	Chaifetz Arena (6,512); St. Louis, MO
December 1, 2018*; 4:00 pm, FSMW		Butler	W 64–52	6–1	18 – Bess	8 – French	3 – Tied	Chaifetz Arena (9,572); St. Louis, MO
December 5, 2018*; 7:00 pm, ESPN+		at Southern Illinois	L 56–61	6–2	13 – French	15 – Bess	6 – Bess	SIU Arena (5,021); Carbondale, IL
December 9, 2018*; 2:30 pm, ESPNU		Oregon State	W 65–61	7–2	24 – Bess	6 – Foreman	3 – French	Chaifetz Arena (6,853); St. Louis, MO
December 16, 2018*; 2:00 pm, ESPNU		at No. 24 Houston	L 64–68	7–3	17 – Bess	10 – Goodwin	2 – Isabell Jr.	Fertitta Center (6,131); Houston, TX
December 19, 2018*; 7:00 pm, FSMW		North Carolina Central	W 75–64	8–3	19 – Bess	7 – French	6 – Bess	Chaifetz Arena (6,678); St. Louis, MO
December 22, 2018*; 1:30 pm, FS2/FSMW+		vs. No. 11 Florida State; Orange Bowl Basketball Classic	L 59–81	8–4	16 – Bess	9 – Goodwin	4 – Goodwin	BB&T Center; Sunrise, FL
December 30, 2018*; 2:00 pm, FSMW		Appalachian State	W 83–55	9–4	20 – Bess	12 – French	6 – Isabell Jr.	Chaifetz Arena (7,143); St. Louis, MO
A-10 Regular Season
January 6, 2019; 3:00 pm, ESPNU		Rhode Island	W 60–53	10–4 (1–0)	24 – Bess	11 – French	5 – Isabell Jr.	Chaifetz Arena (7,356); St. Louis, MO
January 9, 2019; 8:00 pm, CBSSN		Massachusetts	W 65–62	11–4 (2–0)	25 – French	7 – Isabell Jr.	7 – Isabell Jr.	Chaifetz Arena (6,325); St. Louis, MO
January 12, 2019; 5:00 pm, NBCSN		at La Salle	W 71–64	12–4 (3–0)	12 – Tied	10 – French	6 – Goodwin	Tom Gola Arena (1,821); Philadelphia, PA
January 15, 2019; 6:00 pm		at Fordham	W 63–60	13–4 (4–0)	20 – Goodwin	11 – Bess	6 – Goodwin	Rose Hill Gymnasium (1,778); Bronx, NY
January 18, 2019; 6:00 pm, ESPN2		Saint Joseph's	W 68–57	14–4 (5–0)	20 – Tied	11 – French	8 – Isabell Jr.	Chaifetz Arena (7,852); St. Louis, MO
January 23, 2019; 7:00 pm		at Duquesne	L 73–77	14–5 (5–1)	24 – Bess	12 – Goodwin	12 – Goodwin	Palumbo Center (3,011); Pittsburgh, PA
January 26, 2019; 1:00 pm, CBSSN		Davidson	L 53–54	14–6 (5–2)	12 – Tied	12 – French	6 – Goodwin	Chaifetz Arena (9,358); St. Louis, MO
January 30, 2019; 6:00 pm, FSMW		Richmond	L 81–84	14–7 (5–3)	31 – Bess	12 – French	6 – Isabell Jr.	Chaifetz Arena (4,597); St. Louis, MO
February 2, 2019; 3:00 pm, CBSSN		at Rhode Island	L 54–65	14–8 (5–4)	17 – Goodwin	10 – French	3 – Bess	Ryan Center (6,129); Kingston, RI
February 5, 2019; 8:00 pm, CBSSN		Dayton	W 73–60	15–8 (6–4)	18 – Foreman	9 – Foreman	5 – Goodwin	Chaifetz Arena (6,311); St. Louis, MO
February 8, 2019; 6:00 pm, ESPN2		at Saint Joseph's	L 61–91	15–9 (6–5)	17 – Isabell Jr.	8 – Goodwin	4 – Isabell Jr.	Hagan Arena (2,784); Philadelphia, PA
February 13, 2019; 5:30 pm, CBSSN		at George Washington	W 73–58	16–9 (7–5)	26 – Bess	13 – French	9 – Goodwin	Charles E. Smith Center (2,012); Washington, D.C.
February 16, 2019; 4:00 pm, CBSSN		La Salle	W 62–49	17–9 (8–5)	23 – Isabell Jr.	11 – French	5 – Goodwin	Chaifetz Arena (7,531); St. Louis, MO
February 23, 2019; 5:00 pm, CBSSN		at Dayton	L 62–70	17–10 (8–6)	23 – Isabell Jr.	12 – Bess	7 – Isabell Jr.	UD Arena (13,137); Dayton, OH
February 26, 2019; 6:30 pm, CBSSN		at VCU	L 65–71	17–11 (8–7)	16 – French	9 – Goodwin	4 – Isabell Jr.	Siegel Center (7,637); Richmond, VA
March 2, 2019; 2:00 pm, NBCSN		George Mason	W 81–71	18–11 (9–7)	24 – Goodwin	8 – Goodwin	5 – Goodwin	Chaifetz Arena (6,814); St. Louis, MO
March 6, 2019; 7:00 pm, FSMW		Duquesne	W 85–75	19–11 (10–7)	39 – Isabell	11 – French	7 – Goodwin	Chaifetz Arena (6,711); St. Louis, MO
March 9, 2019; 12:00 pm, ESPN+		at St. Bonaventure	L 57–66	19–12 (10–8)	20 – Stockard	6 – Osunniyi	7 – Stockard	Reilly Center (4,819); Olean, NY
A-10 tournament
March 14, 2019; 7:30 pm, NBCSN	(6)	vs. (11) Richmond; Second Round	W 71–68	20–12	22 – French	12 – French	5 – Isabell Jr.	Barclays Center (5,968); Brooklyn, NY
March 15, 2019; 7:30 pm, NBCSN	(6)	vs. (3) Dayton; Quarterfinals	W 64–55	21–12	24 – Isabell Jr.	9 – Goodwin	6 – Isabell Jr.	Barclays Center (6,857); Brooklyn, NY
March 16, 2019; 2:30 pm, CBSSN	(6)	vs. (2) Davidson; Semifinals	W 67–44	22–12	24 – Bess	11 – Foreman	8 – Isabell Jr.	Barclays Center (8,133); Brooklyn, NY
March 17, 2019; 12:00 pm, CBS	(6)	vs. (4) St. Bonaventure; Championship	W 55–53	23–12	16 – Goodwin	14 – Goodwin	5 – Isabell Jr.	Barclays Center (8,371); Brooklyn, NY
NCAA tournament
March 22, 2019*; 8:57 pm, truTV	(13 E)	vs. (4 E) No. 16 Virginia Tech; First Round	L 52–66	23–13	14 – Bess	11 – Bess	3 – French	SAP Center (12,824); San Jose, CA
*Non-conference game. ^{#}Rankings from AP Poll. (#) Tournament seedings in parentheses. E=East. All times are in Central Time.
