= 2018–19 UMass Minutemen basketball team =

American college basketball season

2018–19 UMass Minutemen basketball
- Conference: Atlantic 10 Conference
- Record: 11–21 (4–14 A-10)
- Head coach: Matt McCall (2nd season)
- Assistant coaches: Cliff Warren; Rasheen Davis; Peter Gash
- Home arena: William D. Mullins Memorial Center

2018–19 Atlantic 10 men's basketball standings
	Conf.				Overall
Team	W		L	PCT	W		L	PCT
VCU	16	–	2	.889	25	–	8	.758
Davidson	14	–	4	.778	24	–	10	.706
Dayton	13	–	5	.722	21	–	12	.636
St. Bonaventure	12	–	6	.667	18	–	16	.529
George Mason	11	–	7	.611	18	–	15	.545
Saint Louis †	10	–	8	.556	23	–	13	.639
Duquesne	10	–	8	.556	19	–	13	.594
Rhode Island	9	–	9	.500	18	–	15	.545
La Salle	8	–	10	.444	10	–	21	.323
Saint Joseph's	6	–	12	.333	14	–	19	.424
Richmond	6	–	12	.333	13	–	20	.394
George Washington	4	–	14	.222	9	–	24	.273
Massachusetts	4	–	14	.222	11	–	21	.344
Fordham	3	–	15	.167	12	–	20	.375
† 2019 Atlantic 10 tournament winner

The 2018–19 UMass Minutemen basketball team represented the University of Massachusetts Amherst during the 2018–19 NCAA Division I men's basketball season. The Minutemen were led by second-year head coach Matt McCall and played their home games at the William D. Mullins Memorial Center in Amherst, Massachusetts as members of the Atlantic 10 Conference. They finished the season 11-21, 4-14 in A-10 Play to tie for 12th place. They lost in the first round of the A-10 tournament to George Washington.

== Previous season ==
The Minutemen finished the 2017–18 season 13–20, 5–13 in A-10 play to finish in 13th place. They beat La Salle in the first round of the A-10 tournament before losing in the second round to George Mason.

== Offseason ==
=== Departures ===
Name	Number	Pos.	Height	Weight	Year	Hometown	Reason for departure
Malik Hines	0	F	6'10"	255	Junior	Jackson, MS	Graduate transferred to McNeese State
Jaylen Brantley	1	G	5'11"	170	Senior	Springfield, MA	Graduated
Chris Baldwin	5	F	6'8"	235	Sophomore	Springfield, MA	Transferred to Texas Southern
C. J. Anderson	23	G	6'6"	207	Senior	Memphis, TN	Graduated
Rayshawn Miller	42	G	6'1"	200	Junior	Boston, MA	Walk-on; graduate transferred to Albany

=== Incoming transfers ===
Name	Number	Pos.	Height	Weight	Year	Hometown	Previous School
Djery Baptiste		C	6'10"	245	RS Junior	Gonaïves, Haiti	Transferred from Vanderbilt. Will be eligible to play immediately in December since Baptiste graduated from Vanderbilt. Will have 1 1/2 years left of eligibility.

=== 2018 recruiting class ===
College recruiting information
Name	Hometown	School	Height	Weight	Commit date
Samba Diallo #69 SF	Sparta, NJ	Pope John XXIII Regional High School	6 ft 7 in (2.01 m)	190 lb (86 kg)	Aug 21, 2017
Samba Diallo #69 SF	Recruit ratings: Scout: Rivals: 247Sports: ESPN:				
Tre Wood #58 PG	Upper Marlboro, MD	St. John's College High School	6 ft 0 in (1.83 m)	165 lb (75 kg)	Oct 6, 2017
Tre Wood #58 PG	Recruit ratings: Scout: Rivals: 247Sports: ESPN:				
Sy Chatman; PF	Saint Paul, MN	Cretin-Derham Hall High School	6 ft 8 in (2.03 m)	200 lb (91 kg)	Apr 22, 2018
Sy Chatman; PF	Recruit ratings: Scout: Rivals: 247Sports: ESPN:				
Overall recruit ranking:
Note: In many cases, Scout, Rivals, 247Sports, On3, and ESPN may conflict in their listings of height and weight.; In these cases, the average was taken. ESPN grades are on a 100-point scale.; Sources: "2018 Team Ranking". Rivals.

== Roster ==
2018–19 UMass Minutemen men's basketball team
Players
Coaches

Pos.	#	Name	Height	Weight	Year	Previous school	Hometown
G	0	Tre Wood	6 ft 1 in (1.85 m)	165 lb (75 kg)	Fr	St. John's College HS	Upper Marlboro, MD
G	1	Jonathan Laurent	6 ft 6 in (1.98 m)	215 lb (98 kg)	RS Jr	Dr. Phillips HS; Rutgers	Lakeland, FL
G	2	Luwane Pipkins	5 ft 11 in (1.8 m)	180 lb (82 kg)	RS Jr	Bogan HS	Chicago, IL
G	3	Kieran Hayward	6 ft 4 in (1.93 m)	195 lb (88 kg)	RS So	St Joseph's College; LSU	Sydney, Australia
G	4	Unique McLean	6 ft 2 in (1.88 m)	180 lb (82 kg)	RS So	MacDuffie School	Brooklyn, NY
F	5	Samba Diallo	6 ft 7 in (2.01 m)	195 lb (88 kg)	Fr	Pope John XXIII Regional HS	Rufisque, Senegal
F	10	Sy Chatman	6 ft 8 in (2.03 m)	200 lb (91 kg)	Fr	Cretin-Derham Hall HS	Saint Paul, MN
C	11	Djery Baptiste	6 ft 10 in (2.08 m)	245 lb (111 kg)	GS	Prestonwood Christian Academy	Gonaives, Haiti
G	12	Carl Pierre	6 ft 4 in (1.93 m)	185 lb (84 kg)	So	Boston College HS	Boston, MA
G	13	Jaylen Franklin (W)	6 ft 0 in (1.83 m)	180 lb (82 kg)	Jr	MacDuffie School	Springfield, MA
C	14	Khaela Turner-Morris	6 ft 9 in (2.06 m)	250 lb (113 kg)	So	New Hampton School (NH)	Springfield, MA
G	20	Keon Clergeot	6 ft 1 in (1.85 m)	185 lb (84 kg)	RS So	Auburndale HS; Memphis	Winter Haven, FL
F	31	Randall West	6 ft 4 in (1.93 m)	235 lb (107 kg)	RS Jr	Lawrenceville School	Moorestown, NJ
G	33	Curtis Cobb	6 ft 4 in (1.93 m)	195 lb (88 kg)	RS Jr	Wilbraham & Monson Academy; Fairfield	Fall River, MA
F	41	Aidan Byrne	6 ft 6 in (1.98 m)	235 lb (107 kg)	RS Jr	Niskayuna HS	Niskayuna, NY
C	45	Rashaan Holloway	6 ft 11 in (2.11 m)	310 lb (141 kg)	Sr	Schalick HS	Elmer, NJ

Head coach

- Matt McCall (Chattanooga)

Assistant coach(es)

- Cliff Warren (Maryland)
- Rasheen Davis (VCU)
- Peter Gash (Chattanooga)

Legend

- (C) Team captain
- (S) Suspended
- (I) Ineligible
- (W) Walk-on
- Injured
- Current redshirt

Roster

== Schedule and results ==
Date time, TV	Rank^{#}	Opponent^{#}	Result	Record	Site (attendance) city, state
Exhibition
October 30, 2018*; 7:00 pm		Westfield State	W 84–60		Mullins Center; Amherst, MA
Non-conference regular season
November 6, 2018*; 7:30 pm, ELVN		UMass Lowell	W 83–75	1–0	Mullins Center (2,976); Amherst, MA
November 9, 2018*; 7:00 pm		New Hampshire	W 104–75	2–0	Mullins Center (2,563); Amherst, MA
November 13, 2018*; 7:00 pm, NESN		Harvard	L 71–74	2–1	Mullins Center (2,645); Amherst, MA
November 16, 2018*; 7:00 pm		Howard; Las Vegas Holiday Invitational	L 63–68	2–2	Mullins Center (2,048); Amherst, MA
November 19, 2018*; 7:00 pm		Arkansas–Pine Bluff; Las Vegas Holiday Invitational	W 92–60	3–2	Mullins Center (2,034); Amherst, MA
November 22, 2018*; 1:30 pm, FS1		vs. Southern Illinois; Las Vegas Holiday Invitational semifinals	W 84–62	4–2	Orleans Arena; Paradise, NV
November 23, 2018*; 10:00 pm, FS1		vs. No. 6 Nevada; Las Vegas Holiday Invitational Championship	L 87–110	4–3	Orleans Arena; Paradise, NV
November 28, 2018*; 7:30 pm, NESN		Quinnipiac	W 69–62	5–3	Mullins Center (2,478); Amherst, MA
December 4, 2018*; 7:00 pm, ELVN		Holy Cross	L 78–82	5–4	Mullins Center (2,257); Amherst, MA
December 7, 2018*; 7:00 pm, FS1		at Providence	W 79–78	6–4	Dunkin' Donuts Center (10,427); Providence, RI
December 12, 2018*; 7:00 pm, ESPN3		at Temple	L 63–65	6–5	Liacouras Center (4,840); Philadelphia, PA
December 21, 2018*; 3:30 pm, ESPN+		Fairleigh Dickinson	W 85–84	7–5	Mullins Center (2,276); Amherst, MA
December 30, 2018*; 6:00 pm, SECN		at Georgia	L 72–91	7–6	Stegeman Coliseum; Athens, GA
A-10 regular season
January 5, 2019; 12:30 pm, NBCSN		La Salle	L 60–69	7–7 (0–1)	Mullins Center (4,154); Amherst, MA
January 9, 2019; 9:00 pm, CBSSN		at Saint Louis	L 62–65	7–8 (0–2)	Chaifetz Arena (6,325); St. Louis, MO
January 13, 2019; 3:30 pm, NBCSN		at Dayton	L 67–72	7–9 (0–3)	UD Arena (12,767); Dayton, OH
January 16, 2019; 7:00 pm, ESPN+		George Mason	L 63–68	7–10 (0–4)	Mullins Center (2,412); Amherst, MA
January 19, 2019; 6:30 pm, NBCSN		at VCU	L 50–68	7–11 (0–5)	Siegel Center (7,637); Richmond, VA
January 23, 2019; 7:00 pm		St. Bonaventure	L 51–65	7–12 (0–6)	Mullins Center (2,551); Amherst, MA
January 27, 2019; 2:00 pm, Stadium		Rhode Island	W 77–70	8–12 (1–6)	Mullins Center (4,145); Amherst, MA
January 30, 2019; 7:00 pm		at La Salle	L 51–60	8–13 (1–7)	Tom Gola Arena; Philadelphia, PA
February 2, 2019; 4:30 pm, NBCSN		at Saint Joseph's	L 62–64	8–14 (1–8)	Hagan Arena (3,691); Philadelphia, PA
February 6, 2019; 7:00 pm		Fordham	L 67–85	8–15 (1–9)	Mullins Center (2,072); Amherst, MA
February 9, 2019; 1:00 pm		Davidson	W 54–51	9–15 (2–9)	Mullins Center (3,878); Amherst, MA
February 13, 2019; 7:00 pm		at George Mason	L 75–80	9–16 (2–10)	EagleBank Arena (3,206); Fairfax, VA
February 20, 2019; 7:00 pm		at George Washington	L 67–79	9–17 (2–11)	Charles E. Smith Center (2,468); Washington, D.C.
February 23, 2019; 2:00 pm		Saint Joseph's	W 80–79	10–17 (3–11)	Mullins Center (3,967); Amherst, MA
February 26, 2019; 7:00 pm		Dayton	L 48–72	10–18 (3–12)	Mullins Center (2,748); Amherst, MA
March 2, 2019; 2:00 pm		at Duquesne	L 73–80	10–19 (3–13)	Palumbo Center (2,980); Pittsburgh, PA
March 6, 2019; 7:00 pm, ESPN+		Richmond	W 87–79	11–19 (4–13)	Mullins Center (2,534); Amherst, MA
March 9, 2019; 4:00 pm, ESPN+		at Rhode Island	L 75–94	11–20 (4–14)	Ryan Center (6,938); Kingston, RI
A-10 tournament
March 13, 2019; 1:00 pm, ESPN+	(13)	vs. (12) George Washington; First Round	L 64–68 ^{OT}	11–21	Barclays Center (4,278); Brooklyn, NY
*Non-conference game. ^{#}Rankings from AP Poll / Coaches' Poll. (#) Tournament seedings in parentheses. All times are in Eastern.

== See also ==
- 2018–19 UMass Minutewomen basketball team
