= 2018–19 Atlantic 10 Conference men's basketball season =

- League: NCAA Division I
- Sport: Basketball
- Teams: 14
- TV partner(s): CBSSN, NBCSN, CBS

Regular season
- Season champions: VCU
- Season MVP: Jón Axel Guðmundsson, Davidson

Tournament
- Champions: Saint Louis
- Runners-up: St. Bonaventure
- Finals MVP: Tramaine Isabell (Saint Louis)

Atlantic 10 men's basketball seasons

2018–19 Atlantic 10 men's basketball standings
	Conf.				Overall
Team	W		L	PCT	W		L	PCT
VCU	16	–	2	.889	25	–	8	.758
Davidson	14	–	4	.778	24	–	10	.706
Dayton	13	–	5	.722	21	–	12	.636
St. Bonaventure	12	–	6	.667	18	–	16	.529
George Mason	11	–	7	.611	18	–	15	.545
Saint Louis †	10	–	8	.556	23	–	13	.639
Duquesne	10	–	8	.556	19	–	13	.594
Rhode Island	9	–	9	.500	18	–	15	.545
La Salle	8	–	10	.444	10	–	21	.323
Saint Joseph's	6	–	12	.333	14	–	19	.424
Richmond	6	–	12	.333	13	–	20	.394
George Washington	4	–	14	.222	9	–	24	.273
Massachusetts	4	–	14	.222	11	–	21	.344
Fordham	3	–	15	.167	12	–	20	.375
† 2019 Atlantic 10 tournament winner

The 2018–19 Atlantic 10 Conference men's basketball season was the 43rd season of Atlantic 10 Conference basketball. The season began with practices in October 2018, followed by the start of the 2018–19 NCAA Division I men's basketball season in November. League play began in late December and ended in March.

The 2019 Atlantic 10 tournament was held from March 13–17, 2019 at the Barclays Center in Brooklyn, New York.

Rhode Island was the defending regular season champion, while Davidson was the defending Tournament champions.

== Head coaches ==
=== Coaching changes ===
On March 22, 2018, Rhode Island announced that head coach Dan Hurley had accepted the head coaching job at Connecticut. On April 4, assistant coach David Cox was promoted to head coach.

On March 23, 2018, La Salle head coach John Giannini and the school mutually agreed to part ways after 14 seasons. Giannini left with a 212–226 record at La Salle. On April 8, the school hired Villanova assistant Ashley Howard as head coach.

=== Coaches ===
Team	Head coach	Previous job	Seasons at school	Overall record	A-10 record	A-10 Championships	NCAA Tournaments	NCAA Final Fours	NCAA Championships
Davidson	Bob McKillop	Long Island Lutheran High School	29	554–330 (.627)	45–27 (.625)	1	9	0	0
Dayton	Anthony Grant	Oklahoma City Thunder (asst.)	1	14–17 (.452)	8–10 (.444)	0	0	0	0
Duquesne	Keith Dambrot	Akron	1	16–16 (.500)	7–11 (.389)	0	3	0	0
Fordham	Jeff Neubauer	Eastern Kentucky	3	39–55 (.415)	19–33 (.365)	0	0	0	0
George Mason	Dave Paulsen	Bucknell	3	47–52 (.475)	23–30 (.434)	0	0	0	0
George Washington	Maurice Joseph	George Washington (asst.)	2	35–33 (.515)	17–19 (.472)	0	0	0	0
La Salle	Ashley Howard	Villanova (asst.)	1	0–0 (–)	0–0 (–)	0	0	0	0
UMass	Matt McCall	Chattanooga	1	13–20 (.394)	5–13 (.278)	0	1	0	0
Rhode Island	David Cox	Rhode Island (asst.)	1	0–0 (–)	0–0 (–)	0	0	0	0
Richmond	Chris Mooney	Air Force	13	237–195 (.549)	118–97 (.549)	0	2	0	0
Saint Joseph's	Phil Martelli	Saint Joseph's (asst.)	23	430–309 (.582)	212–164 (.564)	6	7	0	0
Saint Louis	Travis Ford	Oklahoma State	2	29–37 (.439)	15–21 (.417)	0	0	0	0
St. Bonaventure	Mark Schmidt	Robert Morris	11	192–152 (.558)	95–89 (.516)	1	2	0	0
VCU	Mike Rhoades	Rice	1	18–15 (.545)	9–9 (.500)	0	0	0	0

Notes:

- All records, appearances, titles, etc. are from time with current school only.
- Overall and A-10 records are from time at current school through the end of the 2017–18 season.

=== Conference matrix ===
This table summarizes the head-to-head results between teams in conference play. Each team will play 18 conference games: one game vs. eight opponents and two games against five opponents.

	Davidson	Dayton	Duquesne	Fordham	GM	GW	La Salle	UMass	Rhode Island	Richmond	St. Joseph's	Saint Louis	St. Bonaventure	VCU
vs. Davidson	–	1–0	0–1	0–2	0–1	0–1	1–0	1–0	0–2	0–2	1–1	0–1	0–2	0–1
vs. Dayton	0–1	–	0–2	0–1	1–0	0–1	0–1	0–2	1–1	0–1	0–1	1–1	0–1	2–0
vs. Duquesne	1–0	2–0	–	0–2	0–1	0–2	1–0	0–1	0–1	0–1	0–1	1–1	2–0	1–0
vs. Fordham	2–0	1–0	2–0	–	1–0	1–1	2–0	0–1	0–1	2–0	1–0	1–0	2–0	1–0
vs. George Mason	1–0	0–1	1–0	0–1	–	0–2	0–1	0–2	0–1	0–1	0–1	1–0	1–1	2–0
vs. George Washington	1–0	1–0	2–0	1–1	2–0	–	0–1	0–1	1–0	2–0	0–1	1–0	1–0	2–0
vs. La Salle	0–1	1–0	0–1	0–2	1–0	1–0	–	0–2	1–0	1–1	1–1	2–0	1–0	1–0
vs. UMass	0–1	2–0	1–0	1–0	2–0	1–0	2–0	–	1–1	0–1	1–1	1–0	1–0	1–0
vs. Rhode Island	2–0	1–1	1–0	1–0	1–0	0–1	0–1	1–1	–	0–1	0–1	1–1	0–1	1–1
vs. Richmond	2–0	1–0	1–0	0–1	1–1	0–2	1–1	1–0	1–0	–	1–0	0–1	1–0	2–0
vs. Saint Joseph's	1–1	1–0	1–0	0–1	1–0	1–0	1–1	1–1	1–0	0–1	–	1–1	2–0	1–0
vs. Saint Louis	1–0	1–1	1–1	0–1	0–1	0–1	0–2	0–1	1–1	1–0	1–1	–	1–0	1–0
vs. St. Bonaventure	2–0	1–0	0–2	0–2	1–1	0–1	0–1	0–1	1–0	0–1	0–2	0–1	–	1–0
vs. VCU	1–0	0–2	0–1	0–1	0–2	0–2	0–1	0–1	1–1	0–2	0–1	0–1	0–1	–
Total	14–4	13–5	10–8	3–15	11–7	4–14	8–10	4–14	9–9	6–12	6–12	10–8	12–6	16–2

== Preseason ==
=== Preseason poll ===
Prior to the season at the conference's annual media day, awards and a poll were chosen by a panel of the league's head coaches and select media members.

Rank	Team
1	Saint Louis (15)
2	Saint Joseph's (4)
3	Davidson (6)
4	George Mason (1)
5	Rhode Island
6	Dayton
7	VCU
8	Massachusetts
9	St. Bonaventure
10	Richmond
11	Duquesne
12	La Salle
13	George Washington
14	Fordham
(first place votes)

=== Preseason All-Conference Teams ===
Award	Recipients
Preseason All-Atlantic 10 First Team	Kellan Grady, Davidson
Preseason All-Atlantic 10 First Team	Otis Livingston, George Mason
Preseason All-Atlantic 10 First Team	Josh Cunningham, Dayton
Preseason All-Atlantic 10 First Team	Luwane Pipkins, Massachusetts
Preseason All-Atlantic 10 First Team	Grant Golden, Richmond
Preseason All-Atlantic 10 Second Team	Eric Williams Jr., Duquesne
Preseason All-Atlantic 10 Second Team	Pookie Powell, La Salle
Preseason All-Atlantic 10 Second Team	Jeff Dowtin, Rhode Island
Preseason All-Atlantic 10 Second Team	Courtney Stockard, St. Bonaventure
Preseason All-Atlantic 10 Second Team	Javon Bess, Saint Louis
Preseason All-Atlantic 10 Second Team	Jordan Goodwin, Saint Louis
Preseason All-Atlantic 10 Third Team	Jón Axel Guðmundsson, Davidson
Preseason All-Atlantic 10 Third Team	Lamarr Kimble, Saint Joseph's
Preseason All-Atlantic 10 Third Team	Charlie Brown Jr., Saint Joseph's
Preseason All-Atlantic 10 Third Team	Hasahn French, Saint Louis
Preseason All-Atlantic 10 Third Team	De'Riante Jenkins, VCU

== Regular season ==
=== Early season tournaments ===
Team	Tournament	Finish
Davidson	Charleston Classic	3rd
Dayton	Battle 4 Atlantis	4th
Fordham	John Bach Classic	1st
George Mason	Emerald Coast Classic	4th
George Washington	Hall of Fame Tip Off	4th
La Salle	Battle at the Boardwalk	1st
La Salle	Wooden Legacy	8th
Massachusetts	Las Vegas Holiday Invitational	2nd
Rhode Island	Diamond Head Classic	6th
Richmond	Fort Myers Tip-Off	4th
Saint Joseph's	Myrtle Beach Invitational	4th
Saint Louis	Barclays Center Classic	1–1
St. Bonaventure	Cayman Islands Classic	8th
VCU	Legends Classic	2nd

== Postseason ==
=== 2019 A-10 Tournament ===
Semifinals; Saturday, March 16; CBSSN
8	Rhode Island	51
4	St. Bonaventure	68
2	Davidson	44
6	Saint Louis	67

Championship; Sunday, March 17; CBS
4	St. Bonaventure	53
6	Saint Louis	55

=== 2019 NCAA Tournament ===
Two teams from the Atlantic 10 qualified for the NCAA Tournament. Tournament champions Saint Louis qualified through the conference's automatic bid, and regular season champions, VCU, qualified through an at-large bid. It was the 14th straight season in which the conference earned an at-large bid.

Seed	Region	School	1st Round	2nd Round	Sweet Sixteen	Elite Eight	Final Four	Championship
8	East	VCU	eliminated by (9) UCF, 58-73					
13	East	Saint Louis	eliminated by (4) Virginia Tech, 52-66					

=== 2019 NIT ===
Two teams from the Atlantic 10 earned at-large bids into the NIT.

Seed	School	First Round	Second Round	Quarterfinals	Semifinals	Championship
4	Davidson	eliminated by (5) Lipscomb, 81-89				
5	Dayton	eliminated by (4) Colorado, 73-78				
