= 2018–19 La Salle Explorers men's basketball team =

American college basketball season

2018–19 La Salle Explorers men's basketball
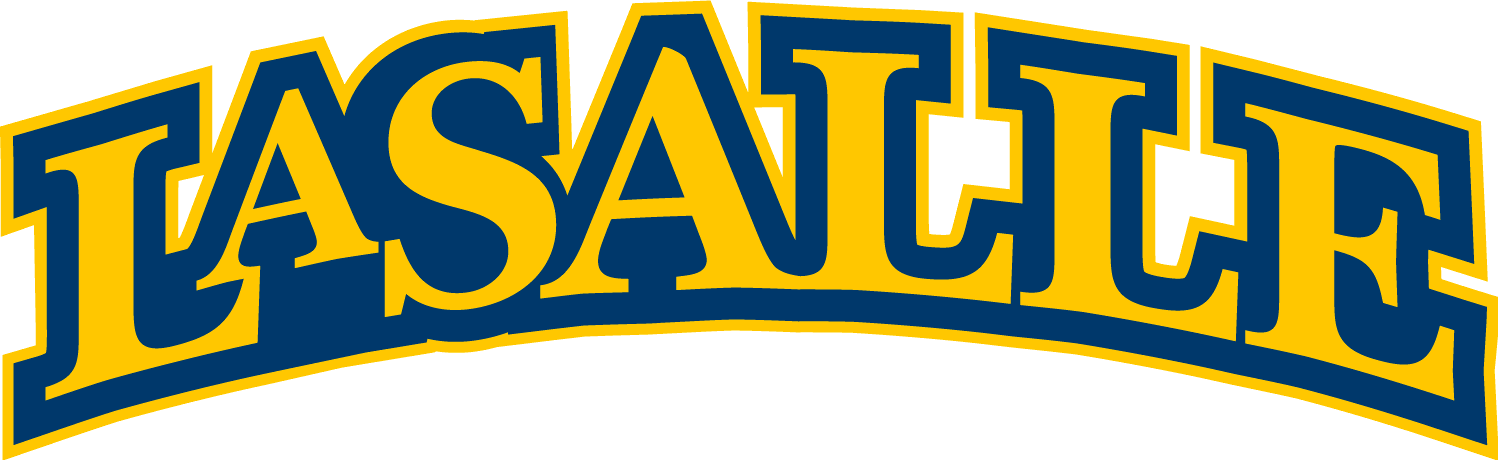

Battle at the Boardwalk Champions
- Conference: Atlantic 10 Conference
- Record: 10–21 (8–10 A-10)
- Head coach: Ashley Howard (1st season)
- Assistant coaches: Kenny Johnson; Donnie Carr; Kyle Griffin
- Home arena: Tom Gola Arena

2018–19 Atlantic 10 men's basketball standings
	Conf.				Overall
Team	W		L	PCT	W		L	PCT
VCU	16	–	2	.889	25	–	8	.758
Davidson	14	–	4	.778	24	–	10	.706
Dayton	13	–	5	.722	21	–	12	.636
St. Bonaventure	12	–	6	.667	18	–	16	.529
George Mason	11	–	7	.611	18	–	15	.545
Saint Louis †	10	–	8	.556	23	–	13	.639
Duquesne	10	–	8	.556	19	–	13	.594
Rhode Island	9	–	9	.500	18	–	15	.545
La Salle	8	–	10	.444	10	–	21	.323
Saint Joseph's	6	–	12	.333	14	–	19	.424
Richmond	6	–	12	.333	13	–	20	.394
George Washington	4	–	14	.222	9	–	24	.273
Massachusetts	4	–	14	.222	11	–	21	.344
Fordham	3	–	15	.167	12	–	20	.375
† 2019 Atlantic 10 tournament winner

The 2018–19 La Salle Explorers basketball team represented La Salle University during the 2018–19 NCAA Division I men's basketball season. The Explorers, led by first-year head coach Ashley Howard, played their home games at Tom Gola Arena in Philadelphia, Pennsylvania as members of the Atlantic 10 Conference. They finished the season 10–21, 8–10 in A-10 play to finish in ninth place. They lost in the second round of the A-10 tournament to Rhode Island.

== Previous season ==
The Explorers finished the 2017–18 season 13–19, 7–11 in A-10 play to finish in a three-way tie for 10th place. As the No. 12 seed in the A-10 tournament, they lost in the first round to Massachusetts.

On March 23, 2018, head coach John Giannini and the school mutually agreed to part ways after 14 seasons. Giannini left with a 212–226 record at La Salle. On April 8, the school hired Villanova assistant Ashley Howard as head coach.

== Offseason ==
=== Departures ===
Name	Number	Pos.	Height	Weight	Year	Hometown	Reason for departure
Johnnie Shuler	1	G	5'11"	175	Senior	Washington, D.C.	Graduated
Amar Stukes	2	G	6'2"	190	RS Senior	Philadelphia, PA	Graduated
Tony Washington	5	C	6'10"	230	RS Senior	Detroit, MI	Graduated
B. J. Johnson	20	G/F	6'7"	200	RS Senior	Philadelphia, PA	Graduated
Dajour Joseph	23	G/F	6'6"	207	Freshman	Haverhill, MA	Transferred to South Plains College

=== Incoming transfers ===
Name	Number	Pos.	Height	Weight	Year	Hometown	Previous School
David Beatty	1	G	6'2"	205	Sophomore	Philadelphia, PA	Transferred from South Carolina. Under NCAA transfer rules, Beatty would have sat out the 2018–19 season, but was granted a waiver to play immediately.
Scott Spencer	2	G	6'6"	190	Junior	Suffolk, VA	Transferred from South Carolina. Under NCAA transfer rules, Spencer will sit out the 2018–19 season. Will have two years of remaining eligibility.
Cheddi Mosely	12	G	6'3"	195	RS Senior	Jersey City, NJ	Transferred from Boston University. Will be eligible to play immediately since Mosley graduated from Boston.

=== 2018 recruiting class ===
College recruiting information
Name	Hometown	School	Height	Weight	Commit date
Jack Clark #71 SF	Wyncote, PA	Cheltenham High School	6 ft 5 in (1.96 m)	220 lb (100 kg)	Oct 5, 2017
Jack Clark #71 SF	Recruit ratings: Scout: Rivals: (NR)				
Jared Kimbrough #66 C	Neptune, NJ	Neptune High School	6 ft 7 in (2.01 m)	N/A	Sep 9, 2017
Jared Kimbrough #66 C	Recruit ratings: Scout: Rivals: (70)				
Ed Croswell; PF	Philadelphia, PA	St. Joseph's Prep School	6 ft 8 in (2.03 m)	N/A	
Ed Croswell; PF	Recruit ratings: Scout: Rivals: (NR)				
Overall recruit ranking:
Note: In many cases, Scout, Rivals, 247Sports, On3, and ESPN may conflict in their listings of height and weight.; In these cases, the average was taken. ESPN grades are on a 100-point scale.; Sources: "2018 Team Ranking". Rivals.

== Roster ==
2018–19 La Salle Explorers men's basketball team
Players
Coaches

Pos.	#	Name	Height	Weight	Year	Previous school	Hometown
G	0	Pookie Powell	6 ft 0 in (1.83 m)	185 lb (84 kg)	RS Sr	Dr. Philips; Memphis	Orlando, FL
G	1	David Beatty	6 ft 2 in (1.88 m)	200 lb (91 kg)	So	Imhotep Institute Charter; South Carolina	Philadelphia, PA
G	2	Scott Spencer (redshirt)	6 ft 6 in (1.98 m)	200 lb (91 kg)	Jr	Blue Ridge; Clemson	Suffolk, VA
G	3	Jamir Moultrie	6 ft 1 in (1.85 m)	175 lb (79 kg)	So	Bishop McNamara	Washington, D.C.
F/C	4	Miles Brookins	6 ft 10 in (2.08 m)	220 lb (100 kg)	So	Mater Dei	Cypress, CA
G	5	Jack Clark	6 ft 6 in (1.98 m)	182 lb (83 kg)	Fr	Cheltenham	Wyncote, PA
G	10	Isiah Deas	6 ft 6 in (1.98 m)	195 lb (88 kg)	Jr	Coastal Academy (NJ)	Brooklyn, NY
F	11	Ed Croswell	6 ft 7 in (2.01 m)	255 lb (116 kg)	Fr	St. Joseph's Prep	Philadelphia, PA
G	12	Cheddi Mosely	6 ft 3 in (1.91 m)	185 lb (84 kg)	RS Sr	St. Anthony; Boston University	Jersey City, NJ
G	13	Saul Phiri	6 ft 4 in (1.93 m)	210 lb (95 kg)	Jr	Putnam Science Academy (CT)	Haverhill, MA
F	24	Jared Kimbrough	6 ft 7 in (2.01 m)	220 lb (100 kg)	Fr	Neptune	Neptune, NJ
G	25	Traci Carter	6 ft 1 in (1.85 m)	175 lb (79 kg)	RS Jr	Life Center Academy (NJ); Marquette	Philadelphia, PA
C	31	Cian Sullivan	7 ft 2 in (2.18 m)	215 lb (98 kg)	RS So	St. Andrews Prep (RI)	Tralee, Ireland

Head coach

- Ashley Howard (Drexel)

Assistant coach(es)

- Kenny Johnson (Maryland)
- Donnie Carr (La Salle)
- Kyle Griffin (Siena)

Legend

- (C) Team captain
- (S) Suspended
- (I) Ineligible
- (W) Walk-on
- Injured
- Current redshirt

Roster

== Schedule and results ==
Date time, TV	Rank^{#}	Opponent^{#}	Result	Record	Site (attendance) city, state
Non-conference regular season
November 6, 2018*; 7:30 pm, ESPN3		at Temple; Big 5	L 67–75	0–1	Liacouras Center (6,011); Philadelphia, PA
November 10, 2018*; 3:00 pm, ESPN+		Lafayette	L 76–77	0–2	Tom Gola Arena (3,400); Philadelphia, PA
November 14, 2018*; 7:00 pm, SECN+		at Florida	L 69–82	0–3	O'Connell Center (8,450); Gainesville, FL
November 17, 2018*; 4:00 pm, ESPN+		Drexel; City 6/A10–CAA Challenge	L 84–89	0–4	Tom Gola Arena (1,410); Philadelphia, PA
November 22, 2018*; 2:30 pm, ESPNU		vs. Miami (FL); Wooden Legacy Quarterfinals	L 49–85	0–5	Titan Gym; Fullerton, CA
November 23, 2018*; 4:30 pm, ESPNU		vs. Northwestern; Wooden Legacy consolation 2nd round	L 74–91	0–6	Titan Gym; Fullerton, CA
November 25, 2018*; 8:00 pm, ESPN3		vs. Grand Canyon; Wooden Legacy 7th place game	L 70–82	0–7	Titan Gym; Fullerton, CA
December 1, 2018*; 3:00 pm, ESPN2		vs. No. 23 Villanova	L 78–85	0–8	Palestra (6,522); Philadelphia, PA
December 4, 2018*; 7:00 pm		Bucknell	L 79–92	0–9	Tom Gola Arena (1,321); Philadelphia, PA
December 8, 2018*; 4:00 pm		Penn	L 65–83	0–10	Tom Gola Arena (1,203); Philadelphia, PA
December 21, 2018*; 7:30 pm, FloSports		vs. Alabama A&M; Battle at the Boardwalk semifinals	W 80–57	1–10	Boardwalk Hall; Atlantic City, NJ
December 22, 2018*; 2:30 pm, FloSports		vs. Towson; Battle at the Boardwalk final	W 57–51	2–10	Boardwalk Hall; Atlantic City, NJ
Atlantic 10 regular season
January 5, 2019; 12:30 pm, NBCSN		at Massachusetts	W 69–60	3–10 (1–0)	Mullins Center (4,154); Amherst, MA
January 9, 2019; 7:00 pm		at VCU	L 63–69	3–11 (1–1)	Siegel Center (7,637); Richmond, VA
January 12, 2019; 6:00 pm, NBCSN		Saint Louis	L 64–71	3–12 (1–2)	Tom Gola Arena (1,821); Philadelphia, PA
January 16, 2019; 8:00 pm		George Washington	L 56–59	3–13 (1–3)	Tom Gola Arena (1,245); Philadelphia, PA
January 19, 2019; 2:30 pm, NBCSN		Rhode Island	L 67–78	3–14 (1–4)	Tom Gola Arena (2,147); Philadelphia, PA
January 23, 2019; 7:00 pm, ESPN+		at Fordham	W 73–71	4–14 (2–4)	Rose Hill Gymnasium (1,731); Bronx, NY
January 30, 2019; 7:00 pm, ESPN+		Massachusetts	W 60–51	5–14 (3–4)	Tom Gola Arena (1,302); Philadelphia, PA
February 2, 2019; 6:00 pm, ESPN+		at Richmond	W 66–58	6–14 (4–4)	Robins Center (6,644); Richmond, VA
February 5, 2019; 7:00 pm, ESPN+		Saint Joseph's	W 83–69	7–14 (5–4)	Tom Gola Arena; Philadelphia, PA
February 10, 2019; 2:00 pm, Stadium		at George Mason	L 76–84	7–15 (5–5)	EagleBank Arena; Fairfax, VA
February 13, 2019; 7:00 pm		Duquesne	W 73–72	8–15 (6–5)	Tom Gola Arena; Philadelphia, PA
February 16, 2019; 5:00 pm, CBSSN		at Saint Louis	L 49–62	8–16 (6–6)	Chaifetz Arena (7,531); St. Louis, MO
February 20, 2019; 7:00 pm		at St. Bonaventure	L 60–62	8–17 (6–7)	Reilly Center (5,480); Olean, NY
February 23, 2019; 4:00 pm		Richmond	L 75–84	8–18 (6–8)	Tom Gola Arena (2,653); Philadelphia, PA
February 27, 2019; 7:00 pm, ESPN+		Davidson	W 79–69	9–18 (7–8)	Tom Gola Arena (1,536); Philadelphia, PA
March 2, 2019; 5:00 pm, NBCSN		at Saint Joseph's	L 62–72	9–19 (7–9)	Hagan Arena; Philadelphia, PA
March 6, 2019; 7:00 pm, ESPN+		at Dayton	L 39–70	9–20 (7–10)	UD Arena (13,147); Dayton, OH
March 9, 2019; 4:00 pm, ESPN+		Fordham	W 72–57	10–20 (8–10)	Tom Gola Arena (1,652); Philadelphia, PA
Atlantic 10 tournament
March 14, 2019; 12:00 pm, NBCSN	(9)	vs. (8) Rhode Island; Second Round	L 57–76	10–21	Barclays Center (6,802); Brooklyn, NY
*Non-conference game. ^{#}Rankings from AP Poll. (#) Tournament seedings in parentheses. All times are in Eastern Time.
