= 2019 Atlantic 10 men's basketball tournament =

- Classification: Division I
- Season: 2018–19
- Teams: 14
- Site: Barclays Center; Brooklyn, New York
- Champions: Saint Louis (2nd title)
- Winning coach: Travis Ford (1st title)
- MVP: Tramaine Isabell (Saint Louis)
- Attendance: 47,603
- Television: ESPN+, NBCSN, CBSSN, CBS

2018–19 Atlantic 10 men's basketball standings
	Conf.				Overall
Team	W		L	PCT	W		L	PCT
VCU	16	–	2	.889	25	–	8	.758
Davidson	14	–	4	.778	24	–	10	.706
Dayton	13	–	5	.722	21	–	12	.636
St. Bonaventure	12	–	6	.667	18	–	16	.529
George Mason	11	–	7	.611	18	–	15	.545
Saint Louis †	10	–	8	.556	23	–	13	.639
Duquesne	10	–	8	.556	19	–	13	.594
Rhode Island	9	–	9	.500	18	–	15	.545
La Salle	8	–	10	.444	10	–	21	.323
Saint Joseph's	6	–	12	.333	14	–	19	.424
Richmond	6	–	12	.333	13	–	20	.394
George Washington	4	–	14	.222	9	–	24	.273
Massachusetts	4	–	14	.222	11	–	21	.344
Fordham	3	–	15	.167	12	–	20	.375
† 2019 Atlantic 10 tournament winner

The 2019 Atlantic 10 men's basketball tournament was the postseason men's basketball tournament for the Atlantic 10 Conference's 2018–19 season. It was held from March 13 through March 17, 2019 at the Barclays Center in Brooklyn, New York. Saint Louis defeated St. Bonaventure 55–53 in the championship game to win the tournament, and received the A10's automatic bid to the NCAA tournament.

== Seeds ==
All 14 A-10 schools will participate in the tournament. Teams will be seeded by record within the conference, with a tiebreaker system to seed teams with identical conference records. The top 10 teams receive a first-round bye and the top four teams receive a double bye.

Seed	School	Record	Tiebreaker
1	VCU	16–2	
2	Davidson	14–4	
3	Dayton	13–5	
4	St. Bonaventure	12–6	
5	George Mason	11–7	
6	Saint Louis	10–8	1–1 vs Duquesne, 0–1 vs VCU, 0–1 vs Davidson, 1–1 vs Dayton
7	Duquesne	10–8	1–1 vs Saint Louis, 0–1 vs VCU, 0–1 vs Davidson, 0–2 vs Dayton
8	Rhode Island	9–9	
9	La Salle	8–10	
10	Saint Joseph's	6–12	1–0 against Richmond
11	Richmond	6–12	0–1 against Saint Joseph's
12	George Washington	4–14	1–0 vs. Massachusetts
13	Massachusetts	4–14	0–1 vs. George Washington
14	Fordham	3–15	

== Schedule ==
Session	Game	Time	Matchup	Score	Television	Attendance
First round – Wednesday, March 13
1	1	1:00 pm	No. 12 George Washington vs No. 13 Massachusetts	68–64	ESPN+	4,278
1	2	3:30 pm	No. 11 Richmond vs No. 14 Fordham	52–50	ESPN+	4,278
Second round – Thursday, March 14
2	3	12:00 pm	No. 8 Rhode Island vs No. 9 La Salle	76–57	NBCSN	6,802
2	4	2:30 pm	No. 5 George Mason vs No. 12 George Washington	61–57	NBCSN	6,802
3	5	6:00 pm	No. 7 Duquesne vs No. 10 Saint Joseph's	86–92	NBCSN	5,968
3	6	8:30 pm	No. 6 Saint Louis vs No. 11 Richmond	71–68	NBCSN	5,968
Quarterfinals – Friday, March 15
4	7	12:00 pm	No. 1 VCU vs No. 8 Rhode Island	70–75	NBCSN	7,194
4	8	2:30 pm	No. 4 St. Bonaventure vs No. 5 George Mason	68–57	NBCSN	7,194
5	9	6:00 pm	No. 2 Davidson vs No. 10 Saint Joseph's	70–60	NBCSN	6,857
5	10	8:30 pm	No. 3 Dayton vs No. 6 Saint Louis	55–64	NBCSN	6,857
Semifinals – Saturday, March 16
6	11	1:00 pm	No. 8 Rhode Island vs No. 4 St. Bonaventure	51–68	CBSSN	8,133
6	12	3:30 pm	No. 2 Davidson vs No. 6 Saint Louis	44–67	CBSSN	8,133
Championship – Sunday, March 17
7	13	1:00 pm	No. 4 St. Bonaventure vs No. 6 Saint Louis	53–55	CBS	8, 371

*Game times in Eastern Time.

== Bracket ==
First round Wednesday, March 13; ESPN+
12	George Washington	68*
13	Massachusetts	64
11	Richmond	52
14	Fordham	50

Second round Thursday, March 14; NBCSN
8	Rhode Island	76
9	La Salle	57
5	George Mason	61
12	George Washington	57
7	Duquesne	86
10	Saint Joseph's	92
6	Saint Louis	71
11	Richmond	68

Quarterfinals; Friday, March 15; NBCSN
1	VCU	70
8	Rhode Island	75
4	St. Bonaventure	68
5	George Mason	57
2	Davidson	70
10	Saint Joseph's	60
3	Dayton	55
6	Saint Louis	64

Semifinals; Saturday, March 16; CBSSN
8	Rhode Island	51
4	St. Bonaventure	68
2	Davidson	44
6	Saint Louis	67

Championship; Sunday, March 17; CBS
4	St. Bonaventure	53
6	Saint Louis	55

* denotes overtime period
