= Coastal Athletic Association men's basketball tournament =

American college basketball conference championship

- Conference basketball championship
- Sport: Basketball
- Conference: Coastal Athletic Association
- Number of teams: 14
- Format: Single-elimination tournament
- Current stadium: CareFirst Arena
- Current location: Washington, DC
- Played: 1980–present
- Last contest: 2025
- Current champion: UNC Wilmington Seahawks (7)
- Most championships: Old Dominion Monarchs (8)
- TV partner: CBS Sports Network
- Official website: Colonial Athletic Association men's basketball

Host stadiums
- CareFirst Arena (2020, 2022–2027); Atlantic Union Bank Center (2021); North Charleston Coliseum (2017–2019); Royal Farms Arena (2014–2016); Richmond Coliseum (1990–2013); Patriot Center (1986); William & Mary Hall (1985); Convocation Center (1984); Robins Center (1983); Norfolk Scope (1982); Hampton Coliseum (1980–1981, 1987–1989)

Host locations
- Washington, DC (2020, 2022–2027); North Charleston, SC (2017–2019); Baltimore, MD (2014–2016); Richmond, VA (1990–2013); Fairfax, VA (1986); Williamsburg, VA (1985); Harrisonburg, VA (1984, 2021); Richmond, VA (1983); Norfolk, VA (1982); Hampton, VA (1980–1981, 1987–1989)

The Coastal Athletic Association men's basketball tournament is the conference championship tournament in basketball for the Coastal Athletic Association (formerly known as the Colonial Athletic Association). The tournament has been held every year since at least 1980; for the 1979-80 to 1984-85 seasons the conference was known as the ECAC South. It is a single-elimination tournament and seeding is based on regular season records. The winner, declared conference champion, receives the conference's automatic bid to the NCAA basketball tournament.

== Results ==
Year	Champion	Score	Runner-up	Tournament MVP	Location
1980	Old Dominion	62–51^{†}	Navy	Mark West, ODU	Hampton Coliseum (Hampton, VA)
1981	James Madison	69–60	Richmond	Charles Fisher, JMU	Hampton Coliseum (Hampton, VA)
1982	Old Dominion	58–57	James Madison	Mark West, ODU	Norfolk Scope (Norfolk, VA)
1983	James Madison	41–38	William & Mary	Derek Steele, JMU	Robins Center (Richmond, VA)
1984	Richmond	74–55	Navy	Johnny Newman, Richmond	JMU Convocation Center (Harrisonburg, VA)
1985	Navy	85–76	Richmond	Vernon Butler, Navy	William & Mary Hall (Williamsburg, VA)
1986	Navy	72–61	George Mason	David Robinson, Navy	Patriot Center (Fairfax, VA)
1987	Navy	53–50	UNC Wilmington	David Robinson, Navy	Hampton Coliseum (Hampton, VA)
1988	Richmond	73–70	George Mason	Peter Wollfolk, Richmond	Hampton Coliseum (Hampton, VA)
1989	George Mason	78–72^{†}	UNC Wilmington	Kenny Sanders, GMU	Hampton Coliseum (Hampton, VA)
1990	Richmond	77–72	James Madison	Kenny Atkinson, Richmond	Richmond Coliseum (Richmond, VA)
1991	Richmond	81–78	George Mason	Jim Shields, Richmond	Richmond Coliseum (Richmond, VA)
1992	Old Dominion	78–73	James Madison	Ricardo Leonard, ODU	Richmond Coliseum (Richmond, VA)
1993	East Carolina	54–49	James Madison	Lester Lyons, ECU	Richmond Coliseum (Richmond, VA)
1994	James Madison	77–76	Old Dominion	Odell Hodge, ODU	Richmond Coliseum (Richmond, VA)
1995	Old Dominion	80–75	James Madison	Petey Sessoms, ODU	Richmond Coliseum (Richmond, VA)
1996	VCU	46–43	UNC Wilmington	Bernard Hopkins, VCU	Richmond Coliseum (Richmond, VA)
1997	Old Dominion	62–58	James Madison	Odell Hodge, ODU	Richmond Coliseum (Richmond, VA)
1998	Richmond	79–64	UNC Wilmington	Daryl Oliver, Richmond	Richmond Coliseum (Richmond, VA)
1999	George Mason	63–58	Old Dominion	George Evans, GMU	Richmond Coliseum (Richmond, VA)
2000	UNC Wilmington	57–47	Richmond	Brett Blizzard, UNCW	Richmond Coliseum (Richmond, VA)
2001	George Mason	35–33	UNC Wilmington	Erik Herring, GMU	Richmond Coliseum (Richmond, VA)
2002	UNC Wilmington	66–51	VCU	Brett Blizzard, UNCW	Richmond Coliseum (Richmond, VA)
2003	UNC Wilmington	70–62	Drexel	Brett Blizzard, UNCW	Richmond Coliseum (Richmond, VA)
2004	VCU	55–54	George Mason	Domonic Jones, VCU	Richmond Coliseum (Richmond, VA)
2005	Old Dominion	73–66^{†}	VCU	Alex Loughton, ODU	Richmond Coliseum (Richmond, VA)
2006	UNC Wilmington	78–67	Hofstra	TJ Carter, UNCW	Richmond Coliseum (Richmond, VA)
2007	VCU	65–59	George Mason	Eric Maynor, VCU	Richmond Coliseum (Richmond, VA)
2008	George Mason	68–59	William & Mary	Folarin Campbell, GMU	Richmond Coliseum (Richmond, VA)
2009	VCU	71–50	George Mason	Eric Maynor, VCU	Richmond Coliseum (Richmond, VA)
2010	Old Dominion	60–53	William & Mary	Gerald Lee, ODU	Richmond Coliseum (Richmond, VA)
2011	Old Dominion	70–65	VCU	Frank Hassell, ODU	Richmond Coliseum (Richmond, VA)
2012	VCU	59–56	Drexel	Darius Theus, VCU	Richmond Coliseum (Richmond, VA)
2013	James Madison	70–57	Northeastern	A. J. Davis, JMU	Richmond Coliseum (Richmond, VA)
2014	Delaware	75–74	William & Mary	Jarvis Threatt, Delaware	Baltimore Arena (Baltimore, MD)
2015	Northeastern	72–61	William & Mary	Quincy Ford, Northeastern	Baltimore Arena (Baltimore, MD)
2016	UNC Wilmington	80–73^{†}	Hofstra	Chris Flemmings, UNCW	Baltimore Arena (Baltimore, MD)
2017	UNC Wilmington	78–69	Charleston	C. J. Bryce, UNCW	North Charleston Coliseum (North Charleston, SC)
2018	Charleston	83–76^{†}	Northeastern	Grant Riller, Charleston	North Charleston Coliseum (North Charleston, SC)
2019	Northeastern	82–74	Hofstra	Vasilije Pušica, Northeastern	North Charleston Coliseum (North Charleston, SC)
2020	Hofstra	70–61	Northeastern	Desure Buie, Hofstra	Entertainment and Sports Arena (Washington, D.C.)
2021	Drexel	63–56	Elon	Camren Wynter, Drexel	Atlantic Union Bank Center (Harrisonburg, VA)
2022	Delaware	59–55	UNC Wilmington	Jyare Davis, Delaware	Entertainment and Sports Arena (Washington, D.C.)
2023	Charleston	63–58	UNC Wilmington	Ryan Larson, Charleston	Entertainment and Sports Arena (Washington, D.C.)
2024	Charleston	82–79^{†}	Stony Brook	Reyne Smith, Charleston	Entertainment and Sports Arena (Washington, D.C.)
2025	UNC Wilmington	76–72	Delaware	Donovan Newby, UNCW	CareFirst Arena (Washington, D.C.) (Note: CareFirst Arena was known as Entertainment and Sports Arena when it hosted prior to 2025.)
2026	Hofstra	75–69	Monmouth	Preston Edmead, Hofstra	CareFirst Arena (Washington, D.C.)

†	Denotes game went into overtime

== Championships by school ==
School	Championships	Championship Years
Old Dominion^{‡}	8	1980, 1982, 1992, 1995, 1997, 2005, 2010, 2011
UNC Wilmington	7	2000, 2002, 2003, 2006, 2016, 2017, 2025
VCU^{‡}	5	1996, 2004, 2007, 2009, 2012
Richmond^{‡}	5	1984, 1988, 1990, 1991, 1998
George Mason^{‡}	4	1989, 1999, 2001, 2008
James Madison^{‡}	4	1981, 1983, 1994, 2013
Charleston	3	2018, 2023, 2024
Navy^{‡}	3	1985, 1986, 1987
Northeastern	2	2015, 2019
Delaware	2	2014, 2022
Hofstra	2	2020, 2026
Drexel	1	2021
East Carolina^{‡}	1	1993
William & Mary	0	—
Elon	0	—
Stony Brook	0	—
Campbell	0	—
Hampton	0	—
Monmouth	0	—
North Carolina A&T	0	—
Towson	0	—

^{‡}Former member of the CAA

== NCAA Tournament appearances ==
Year	CAA Team	Opponent	Result
1980	(9) Old Dominion	(8) UCLA	L 74–87
1981	(10) James Madison	(7) Georgetown (2) Notre Dame	W 61–55; L 45–54
1982	(9) James Madison	(8) Ohio State (1) North Carolina	W 55–48; L 50–52
1982	(10) Old Dominion	(7) Wake Forest	L 57–74
1983	(10) James Madison	(7) West Virginia (2) North Carolina	W 57–50; L 49–68
1984	(12) Richmond	(12) Rider (5) Auburn (4) Indiana	W 89–65; W 72–71; L 67–75
1985	(13) Navy	(4) LSU (5) Maryland	W 78–55; L 59–64
1986	(11) Richmond	(6) Saint Joseph's	L 59–60
1986	(7) Navy	(10) Tulsa (2) Syracuse (14) Cleveland State (1) Duke	W 87–68; W 97–85; W 71–70; L 50–71
1987	(8) Navy	(9) Michigan	L 82–97
1988	(13) Richmond	(4) Indiana (5) Georgia Tech (1) Temple	W 72–69; W 59–55; L 47–69
1989	(15) George Mason	(2) Indiana	L 85–99
1990	(14) Richmond	(3) Duke	L 46–81
1991	(15) Richmond	(2) Syracuse (10) Temple	W 73–69; L 64–77
1992	(15) Old Dominion	(2) Kentucky	L 69–88
1993	(16) East Carolina	(1) North Carolina	L 65–85
1994	(14) James Madison	(3) Florida	L 62–64
1995	(14) Old Dominion	(3) Villanova (6) Tulsa	W 89–81^{3OT} L 52–64
1996	(12) VCU	(5) Mississippi State	L 51–58
1997	(14) Old Dominion	(3) New Mexico	L 55–59
1998	(14) Richmond	(3) South Carolina (11) Washington	W 62–61; L 66–81
1999	(14) George Mason	(3) Cincinnati	L 48–72
2000	(15) UNC Wilmington	(2) Cincinnati	L 47–64
2001	(14) George Mason	(3) Maryland	L 80–83
2002	(13) UNC Wilmington	(4) USC (5) Indiana	W 93–89^{OT} L 67–76
2003	(11) UNC Wilmington	(6) Maryland	L 73–75
2004	(13) VCU	(4) Wake Forest	L 78–79
2005	(12) Old Dominion	(5) Michigan State	L 81–89
2006	(9) UNC Wilmington	(8) George Washington	L 85–88^{OT}
2006	(11) George Mason	(6) Michigan State (3) North Carolina (7) Wichita State (1) Connecticut (3) Florida	W 75–65; W 65–60; W 63–55; W 86–84^{OT} L 58–73
2007	(11) VCU	(6) Duke (3) Pittsburgh	W 79–77; L 79–84^{OT}
2007	(12) Old Dominion	(5) Butler	L 46–57
2008	(12) George Mason	(5) Notre Dame	L 50–68
2009	(11) VCU	(6) UCLA	L 64–65
2010	(11) Old Dominion	(6) Notre Dame (3) Baylor	W 51–50; L 68–76
2011	(8) George Mason	(9) Villanova (1) Ohio State	W 61–57; L 66–98
2011	(9) Old Dominion	(8) Butler	L 58–60
2011	(11) VCU	(11) USC (6) Georgetown (3) Purdue (10) Florida State (1) Kansas (8) Butler	W 59–46; W 74–56; W 94–76; W 72–71^{OT} W 71–61; L 62–70
2012	(12) VCU	(5) Wichita State (4) Indiana	W 62–59; L 61–63
2013	(16) James Madison	(16) Long Island (1) Indiana	W 68–55; L 62–83
2014	(13) Delaware	(4) Michigan State	L 78–93
2015	(14) Northeastern	(3) Notre Dame	L 65–69
2016	(13) UNC Wilmington	(4) Duke	L 85–93
2017	(12) UNC Wilmington	(5) Virginia	L 71–76
2018	(13) Charleston	(4) Auburn	L 58–62
2019	(13) Northeastern	(4) Kansas	L 53–87
2021	(16) Drexel	(1) Illinois	L 49–78
2022	(15) Delaware	(2) Villanova	L 60–80
2023	(12) Charleston	(5) San Diego State	L 57–63
2024	(13) Charleston	(4) Alabama	L 96–109
2025	(14) UNC Wilmington	(3) Texas Tech	L 72–82
2026	(13) Hofstra	(4) Alabama	L 70–90

- 2020 NCAA tournament was canceled due to COVID-19.

== Broadcasters ==
=== Television ===
Year	Network	Play-by-play	Analyst	Sideline
2024	CBSSN	Dave Ryan	Pete Gillen	Amanda Guerra
2023	CBSSN	Dave Ryan	Pete Gillen	Tina Cervasio
2022	CBSSN	Dave Ryan	Pete Gillen	Sherree Burress
2021	CBSSN	Dave Ryan	Pete Gillen	
2020	CBSSN	Dave Ryan	Donny Marshall	Gary Parrish
2019	CBSSN	Dave Ryan	Pete Gillen	Gary Parrish
2018	CBSSN	Dave Ryan	Jordan Cornette	Jenny Dell
2017	CBSSN	Dave Ryan	Pete Gillen	Melanie Collins
2016	NBCSN	Mike Corey	Ronny Thompson	
2015	NBCSN	Mike Corey	Ronny Thompson	
2014	NBCSN	Mike Corey	Ronny Thompson	Dalen Cuff
2013	NBCSN	Todd Harris	Ronny Thompson	Dalen Cuff
2012	ESPN	Mike Patrick	Dan Dakich	
2011	ESPN	Mike Patrick	Jimmy Dykes	
2010	ESPN2	Mike Patrick	Len Elmore	
2009	ESPN2	Dave Pasch	Len Elmore	
2008	ESPN	Brad Nessler	Jimmy Dykes	
2007	ESPN	Brad Nessler	Jimmy Dykes	
1988	HTS	Mel Proctor	Kevin Grevey	

=== Radio ===
Year	Network	Play-by-play	Analyst
2022	Westwood One	Scott Graham	Rex Walters
2021	Westwood One	Ed Cohen	Doug Gottlieb
2020	Westwood One	Gary Cohen	Will Perdue
2017	HSRN	Mike Corey	Brian Mull
2016	Westwood One	Scott Graham	John Thompson
2015	Westwood One	Scott Graham	Kevin Grevey
2014	Dial Global Sports	Scott Graham	John Thompson
2013	Dial Global Sports	Scott Graham	John Thompson
2012	Dial Global Sports	Scott Graham	John Thompson
2011	Westwood One	Scott Graham	John Thompson
2010	Westwood One	Scott Graham	John Thompson
2009	Westwood One	Tom McCarthy	Kevin Grevey

== See also ==
- Coastal Athletic Association women's basketball tournament
