= UNC Wilmington Seahawks men's basketball statistical leaders =

The UNC Wilmington Seahawks men's basketball statistical leaders are individual statistical leaders of the UNC Wilmington Seahawks men's basketball program in various categories, including points, assists, blocks, rebounds, and steals. Within those areas, the lists identify single-game, single-season, and career leaders. The Seahawks represent the University of North Carolina Wilmington (UNCW) in the NCAA Division I Coastal Athletic Association.

UNC Wilmington began competing in intercollegiate basketball in 1951. The NCAA did not officially record assists as a stat until the 1983–84 season, and blocks and steals until the 1985–86 season, but UNC Wilmington's record books includes players in these stats before these seasons. These lists are updated through the end of the 2020–21 season.

== Scoring ==
Career
Rk	Player	Points	Seasons
1	Brett Blizzard	2,144	1999–00 2000–01 2001–02 2002–03
2	Brian Rowsom	1,973	1983–84 1984–85 1985–86 1986–87
3	Chad Tomko	1,702	2007–08 2008–09 2009–10 2010–11
4	Devontae Cacok	1,593	2015–16 2016–17 2017–18 2018–19
5	Keith Rendleman	1,516	2009–10 2010–11 2011–12 2012–13
6	Jay Neary	1,513	1962–63 1963–64 1964–65 1965–66
7	Shawn Williams	1,439	1979–80 1980–81 1981–82 1982–83
8	Shykeim Phillips	1,403	2019–20 2020–21 2021–22 2022–23 2023–24
9	Jaylen Sims	1,360	2018–19 2019–20 2020–21 2021–22
10	T. J. Carter	1,326	2003–04 2004–05 2005–06 2007–08

Season
Rk	Player	Points	Season
1	Brett Blizzard	655	2002–03
2	Brian Rowsom	653	1986–87
3	CJ Bryce	608	2016–17
4	Trazarien White	593	2023–24
5	Brett Blizzard	591	2001–02
6	Brian Rowsom	590	1985–86
7	Jaylen Sims	589	2021–22
8	Jay Neary	571	1964–65
9	Devontae Cacok	565	2017–18
10	Denny Fields	563	1977–78

Single game
Rk	Player	Points	Season	Opponent
1	Brian Rowsom	39	1986–87	East Carolina
2	Shawn Williams	38	1981–82	Grambling
	Trazarien White	38	2023–24	Campbell
4	Jordon Talley	37	2017–18	Hofstra
5	Brian Rowsom	36	1986–87	James Madison
	Brian Rowsom	36	1986–87	SIU
7	Devontae Cacok	35	2017–18	East Carolina
	Brian Rowsom	35	1986–87	Indiana
	Denny Fields	35	1977–78	UNC Charlotte
10	Khamari McGriff	34	2024–25	Howard
	Chris Flemmings	34	2016–17	Pfeiffer
	Devontae Cacok	34	2016–17	Pfeiffer
	Craig Callahan	34	2002–03	James Madison
	Antonio Howard	34	1988–89	Tennessee Tech

== Rebounds ==
Career
Rk	Player	Rebounds	Seasons
1	Devontae Cacok	1,263	2015–16 2016–17 2017–18 2018–19
2	Keith Rendleman	1,055	2009–10 2010–11 2011–12 2012–13
3	Brian Rowsom	1,012	1983–84 1984–85 1985–86 1986–87
4	Cedrick Williams	768	2011–12 2012–13 2013–14 2014–15
5	Darren Moore	711	1992–93 1993–94 1994–95 1995–96
6	Vladimir Kuljanin	694	2004–05 2005–06 2006–07 2007–08
7	Danny Davis	653	1977–78 1978–79 1979–80 1980–81
8	Garry Cooper	631	1976–77 1977–78 1978–79 1979–80
9	Matt Fish	616	1988–89 1989–90 1990–91 1991–92
10	Dave Wolff	610	1975–76 1976–77 1977–78 1978–79

Season
Rk	Player	Rebounds	Season
1	Devontae Cacok	431	2017–18
2	Devontae Cacok	406	2018–19
3	Brian Rowsom	345	1986–87
4	Devontae Cacok	343	2016–17
5	Vladimir Kuljanin	328	2007–08
6	Patrick Wessler	324	2025–26
7	Keith Rendleman	314	2012–13
8	Keith Rendleman	311	2011–12
9	Brian Rowsom	275	1985–86
10	Danny Davis	265	1979–80

Single game
Rk	Player	Rebounds	Season	Opponent
1	Devontae Cacok	26	2018–19	Allen
2	Devontae Cacok	24	2017–18	James Madison
	Devontae Cacok	24	2016–17	Drexel
4	Devontae Cacok	21	2017–18	Drexel
	Devontae Cacok	21	2017–18	Elon
	Keith Rendleman	21	2012–13	Towson
	John Fields	21	2009–10	Towson
8	Matt Fish	20	1991–92	American
9	Devontae Cacok	19	2018–19	Elon
	Devontae Cacok	19	2018–19	James Madison
	Devontae Cacok	19	2018–19	Charleston
	Devontae Cacok	19	2017–18	Delaware
	Devontae Cacok	19	2016–17	Pfeiffer
	Shane Reybold	19	2013–14	Wingate
	Brian Rowsom	19	1986–87	Navy

== Assists ==
Career
Rk	Player	Assists	Seasons
1	John Goldsberry	530	2002–03 2003–04 2004–05 2005–06
2	Chad Tomko	481	2007–08 2008–09 2009–10 2010–11
3	Jordon Talley	479	2014–15 2015–16 2016–17 2017–18
4	Billy Donlon	456	1995–96 1996–97 1997–98 1998–99
5	Brett Blizzard	360	1999–00 2000–01 2001–02 2002–03
6	Drew Phillips	341	1990–91 1991–92 1992–93 1993–94
7	Jim Brogden	334	1973–74 1974–75 1975–76 1976–77
8	Shykeim Phillips	326	2019–20 2020–21 2021–22 2022–23 2023–24
9	Lamont Franklin	314	1993–94 1994–95 1995–96 1996–97
10	Kai Toews	309	2018–19 2019–20

Season
Rk	Player	Assists	Season
1	Kai Toews	253	2018–19
2	Rick Alessi	244	1974–75
3	Denzel Ingram	189	2016–17
4	Jordon Talley	176	2017–18
5	Billy Donlon	173	1997–98
6	John Goldsberry	172	2005–06
7	Temi Soyebo	170	2006–07
8	Jim Brogden	164	1975–76
9	Bob Martin	153	1976–77
10	Billy Donlon	146	1998–99

Single game
Rk	Player	Assists	Season	Opponent
1	Chad Tomko	15	2008–09	Towson

== Steals ==
Career
Rk	Player	Steals	Seasons
1	Brett Blizzard	249	1999–00 2000–01 2001–02 2002–03
2	John Goldsberry	228	2002–03 2003–04 2004–05 2005–06
3	Chad Tomko	223	2007–08 2008–09 2009–10 2010–11
4	Shykeim Phillips	218	2019–20 2020–21 2021–22 2022–23 2023–24
5	Carlos Kelly	144	1980–81 1981–82 1982–83 1983–84
6	Keith Rendleman	140	2009–10 2010–11 2011–12 2012–13
7	Jordon Talley	129	2014–15 2015–16 2016–17 2017–18
8	Greg Bender	126	1985–86 1986–87 1987–88 1988–89
9	Mike Okauru	122	2019–20 2020–21 2021–22
10	T. J. Carter	119	2003–04 2004–05 2005–06 2007–08
	Stan Simmons	119	1995–96 1996–97 1997–98 1998–99

Season
Rk	Player	Steals	Season
1	Brett Blizzard	70	2001–02
2	Chad Tomko	69	2008–09
	Brett Blizzard	69	2002–03
4	John Goldsberry	67	2005–06
5	Shykeim Phillips	65	2021–22
6	Brett Blizzard	62	1999–00
7	Chad Tomko	58	2010–11
	Bob Martin	58	1976–77
	Shykeim Phillips	58	2023–24
10	John Goldsberry	56	2004–05

Single game
Rk	Player	Steals	Season	Opponent
1	Bob Martin	8	1977–78	Wake Forest
	Temi Soyebo	8	2006–07	Colorado
	Chad Tomko	8	2008–09	Appalachian State

== Blocks ==
Career
Rk	Player	Blocks	Seasons
1	Garry Cooper	180	1976–77 1977–78 1978–79 1979–80
2	Cedrick Williams	173	2011–12 2012–13 2013–14 2014–15
3	Keith Rendleman	142	2009–10 2010–11 2011–12 2012–13
4	Major Wiggins	130	1987–88 1988–89 1989–90 1990–91
5	Sherif El-Sanadily	102	1991–92 1992–93 1993–94
6	Devontae Cacok	91	2015–16 2016–17 2017–18 2018–19
7	Matt Fish	87	1988–89 1989–90 1990–91 1991–92
8	Brian Rowsom	85	1983–84 1984–85 1985–86 1986–87
9	Vladimir Kuljanin	77	2004–05 2005–06 2006–07 2007–08
10	Darren Moore	71	1992–93 1993–94 1994–95 1995–96
	Tim Shaw	71	1989–90 1990–91 1991–92 1992–93

Season
Rk	Player	Blocks	Season
1	John Fields	59	2009–10
2	Garry Cooper	57	1979–80
3	Major Wiggins	53	1989–90
4	Garry Cooper	52	1977–78
5	James Baker	49	2021–22
6	Keith Rendleman	47	2012–13
	Sherif El-Sanadily	47	1993–94
	Major Wiggins	47	1990–91
9	Cedrick Williams	46	2013–14
10	Devontae Cacok	44	2016–17

Single game
Rk	Player	Blocks	Season	Opponent
1	John Fields	6	2009–10	Campbell
	Garry Cooper	6	1977–78	Citadel
	Major Wiggins	6	1990–91	Navy
	Matt Fish	6	1991–92	Campbell
	C.J. Gettys	6	2015–16	Drexel
	C.J. Gettys	6	2015–16	William & Mary
	John Bowen	6	2020–21	East Carolina
	Patrick Wessler	6	2025–26	Hampton
