= Paul Evans (basketball) =

American basketball coach (born 1945)

Biographical details
- Born: January 31, 1945 (age 81)

Playing career

Football
- c. 1965: Ithaca

Basketball
- c. 1965: Ithaca

Coaching career (HC unless noted)

Basketball
- 1973–1980: St. Lawrence
- 1980–1986: Navy
- 1986–1994: Pittsburgh

Head coaching record
- Overall: 390–208
- Tournaments: 7–7 (NCAA Division I); 1–1 (NIT); 0–1 (NCAA Division II); 3–4 (NCAA Division III)

Accomplishments and honors

Championships
- 6 ICAC regular season (1974, 1975, 1977–1980); 2 ECAC South / CAA regular season (1985, 1986); 2 ECAC South / CAA tournament (1986, 1986); 2 Big East regular season (1987, 1988)

Paul C. Evans (born January 31, 1945) is an American former head coach of men's college basketball.

Paul Evans was noted for running a "power offense" with emphasis on distributing the ball through centers and power forwards. His tenures at Navy and Pittsburgh was notable for the development of quality big men such as David Robinson, Charles Smith, Jerome Lane, Brian Shorter, Bobby Martin, Darren Morningstar, and Eric Mobley. He coached at Division III St. Lawrence University for seven season guiding them to six ICAC Conference Championships and five NCAA Division III post-season appearances, including two regional finals. He went on to coach at Navy for six seasons and an overall 199–60 (.665) record which included a cinderella appearance in the 1986 Elite Eight led by star center Robinson. After taking over at Pitt starting in the 1986–87 season, he guided the Panthers to regular season Big East Conference titles in 1987 and 1988, several top 10 rankings in the polls (including as high as #2), and saw the team advance to five NCAA tournaments and one NIT. John Calipari was an assistant under Evans at Pitt prior to him obtaining the head coaching position at UMass. Evans' win–loss record at the University of Pittsburgh was 147–98 (.600) over eight seasons. He was succeeded as head coach at Pitt by Ralph Willard.

== Head coaching record ==
Record table
Season	Team	Overall	Conference	Standing	Postseason
St. Lawrence Saints (Independent College Athletic Conference) (1973–1980)
1973–74	St. Lawrence	17–6		1st	NCAA Division II first round
1974–75	St. Lawrence	20–6		1st	NCAA Division III Regional Runner-up
1975–76	St. Lawrence	13–10			
1976–77	St. Lawrence	15–10		1st	
1977–78	St. Lawrence	19–6		1st	NCAA Division III Regional Runner-up
1978–79	St. Lawrence	18–7		1st	NCAA Division III Regional Runner-up
1979–80	St. Lawrence	22–5		1st	NCAA Division III first round
St. Lawrence:		124–50			
Navy Midshipmen (NCAA Division I independent) (1980–1981)
1980–81	Navy	9–16			
Navy Midshipmen (ECAC South / Colonial Athletic Association) (1981–1985)
1981–82	Navy	12–14	2–4	5th	
1982–83	Navy	18–11	3–3	3rd	
1983–84	Navy	24–8	6–4	2nd	
1984–85	Navy	26–6	11–3	1st	NCAA Division I second round
1985–86	Navy	30–5	13–1	1st	NCAA Division I Elite Eight
Navy:		119–60	35–15		
Pittsburgh Panthers (Big East Conference) (1986–1994)
1986–87	Pittsburgh	25–8	12–4	T–1st	NCAA Division I second round
1987–88	Pittsburgh	24–7	12–4	1st	NCAA Division I second round
1988–89	Pittsburgh	17–13	9–7	4th	NCAA Division I first round
1989–90	Pittsburgh	12–17	5–11	8th	
1990–91	Pittsburgh	21–12	9–7	T–3rd	NCAA Division I second round
1991–92	Pittsburgh	18–16	9–9	7th	NIT second round
1992–93	Pittsburgh	17–11	9–9	6th	NCAA Division I first round
1993–94	Pittsburgh	13–14	7–11	8th	
Pittsburgh:		147–98	72–62		
Total:		390–208			
National champion Postseason invitational champion Conference regular season champion Conference regular season and conference tournament champion Division regular season champion Division regular season and conference tournament champion Conference tournament champion
