= 1984 East Coast Conference (Division I) men's basketball tournament =

Basketball Tournament

- Classification: Division I
- Season: 1983–84
- Teams: 9
- Site: Towson Center; Towson, MD
- Champions: Rider (1st title)
- Winning coach: John Barker Carpenter (1st title)
- MVP: Kevin Thomas (Rider)

1983–84 ECC men's basketball standings
	Conf.				Overall
Team	W		L	PCT	W		L	PCT
Bucknell	14	–	2	.875	24	–	5	.828
Rider †	11	–	5	.688	20	–	11	.645
Drexel	10	–	6	.625	17	–	12	.586
Lafayette	9	–	7	.563	12	–	17	.414
Hofstra	9	–	7	.563	14	–	14	.500
Delaware	6	–	10	.375	11	–	16	.407
American	5	–	11	.313	6	–	22	.214
Towson	5	–	11	.313	10	–	19	.345
Lehigh	3	–	13	.188	4	–	23	.148
† 1984 ECC tournament winner Rankings from AP poll

The 1984 East Coast Conference men's basketball tournament was held March 7–10, 1984. The champion gained and an automatic berth to the NCAA tournament.

== Bracket and results ==
First round Wednesday, March 7
8	Towson	62*
9	Lehigh	60

Quarterfinals; Thursday, March 8
1	Bucknell	64
8	Towson	42
4	Lafayette	69
5	Hofstra	49
3	Drexel	82
6	Delaware	72
2	Rider	49
7	American	47

Semifinals; Friday, March 9
1	Bucknell	46
4	Lafayette	44
3	Drexel	54
2	Rider	60

Championship; Saturday, March 10
1	Bucknell	71
2	Rider	73*

* denotes overtime game

== All-Tournament Team ==
- Jaye Andrews, Bucknell
- Fred Lee, Rider
- Cal Puriefoy, Bucknell
- Kevin Thomas, Rider – Tournament MVP
- Ed Sigl, Bucknell
