= Brad Brownell =

American basketball coach (born 1968)

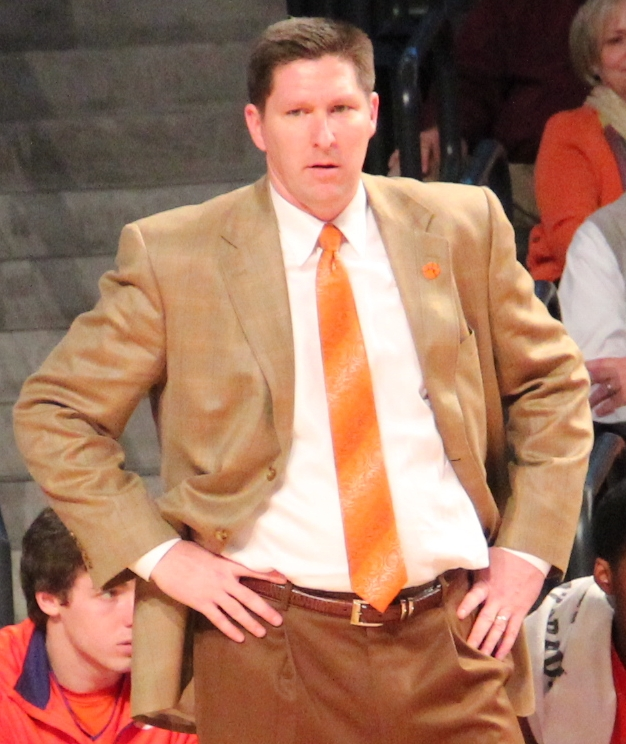
- Brownell in 2013

Current position
- Title: Head coach
- Team: Clemson
- Conference: ACC
- Record: 320–208 (.606)

Biographical details
- Born: November 15, 1968 (age 58); Evansville, Indiana, U.S.

Playing career
- 1988–1991: DePauw

Coaching career (HC unless noted)
- 1991–1992: Evansville (assistant)
- 1992–1994: Indianapolis (assistant)
- 1994–2002: UNC Wilmington (assistant)
- 2002–2006: UNC Wilmington
- 2006–2010: Wright State
- 2010–present: Clemson

Head coaching record
- Overall: 487–293 (.624)
- Tournaments: 6–9 (NCAA Division I); 4–4 (NIT)

Accomplishments and honors

Championships
- 2 CAA tournament (2003, 2006); 2 CAA regular season (2003, 2006); Horizon League tournament (2007); Horizon League regular season (2007)

Awards
- 2× CAA Coach of the Year (2003, 2006); Horizon League Coach of the Year (2008)

Bradley Robert Brownell (born November 15, 1968) is an American college basketball coach at Clemson University. Prior to coming to Clemson, he held the same position at Wright State and UNC Wilmington.

== Early life ==
Born in Evansville, Indiana, Brownell played high school basketball at William Henry Harrison High School with former Indiana University player and current Director of Player Development Calbert Cheaney. Brownell graduated from DePauw University in 1991, where he was a member of the basketball team and the Sigma Chi fraternity. His junior year, Brownell helped lead the Tigers to the NCAA Division III National Championship game, where he missed a shot to win the title. He immediately went into coaching after graduating. He spent one season as an assistant to Jim Crews at the University of Evansville, then spent the next two seasons as an assistant on his former coach Royce Waltman's staff at the University of Indianapolis while earning his master's degree.

== Coaching career ==
Upon completing his master's degree in 1994, Brownell began his tenure at UNC Wilmington as an assistant to then-head coach Jerry Wainwright. Brownell helped guide the Seahawks to four postseason tournament berths while serving as an assistant, including a memorable upset win over the fourth-seeded USC Trojans in the first round of the 2002 NCAA tournament.

=== UNC Wilmington ===
Following that season, Wainwright left Wilmington to take over at Richmond, and Brownell was promoted to head coach.

During his time as the Seahawks' head coach, Brownell led the Seahawks to Colonial Athletic Association titles and NCAA Tournament berths in 2003 and 2006, narrowly losing in the First Round each season. For his efforts, Brownell was named CAA Coach of the Year in 2003 and 2006. In his four years, the Seahawks never finished below .500, and the 2005–2006 season produced a school-record 25 wins.

=== Wright State ===
Following the 2006 season, Brownell left UNC Wilmington to take the head coach's job at Wright State, where he made an immediate impact. In his first season at Wright State, Brownell led the Raiders to their first-ever Horizon League title, beating out nationally ranked Butler, coached by fellow DePauw graduate Brad Stevens, to capture both the regular season and tournament titles. The Raiders earned the 14th seed in the West Region, and lost in the first round of the 2007 NCAA tournament to Pittsburgh. The team's 23 wins was a school record on the Division I level. He was named the NABC District 10 coach of the year for being the best college coach in Ohio and Indiana.

Brownell remained head coach at Wright State through the 2010 season. His teams never finished lower than third in conference play, but he was unable to return the Raiders to postseason play. However, he did lead the team to three straight 20 win seasons.

=== Clemson ===
On April 23, 2010, Brownell was named head coach at Clemson, replacing Oliver Purnell.

Brownell led the Tigers to the NCAA tournament in his first year at the school. The Tigers defeated UAB in the First Four, but lost in the Second Round to West Virginia. After two subpar years, the Tigers returned to postseason play in 2014 earning an NIT bid and reaching the semifinals.

The next three years saw the Tigers finishing within three games of .500 each year and in the lower half of the ACC, but they did receive an NIT bid in 2017, losing in the first round.

On March 20, 2017, the school announced that Brownell would return as head coach for at least one more year. During the 2017–18 season, Brownell lead the Tigers to their first 20-win season since 2013–14. The Tigers finished 11–7 in ACC play, which left them tied for third in the ACC. The Tigers were selected as a #5 seed in the NCAA tournament, and made it to the Sweet 16, where they lost to #1 seed Kansas.

On July 19, 2018, it was announced that Brownell and Clemson had agreed to a six-year, $15 million contract extension. This extension will keep Brownell at the school through 2024.

On January 11, 2020, Brownell coached the Tigers to the program's first road victory at UNC after 59 attempts. The series between the two schools began in 1926.

In the 2023–2024 season, coach Brownell guided his Clemson Tigers to their first NCAA tournament appearance since 2021 and their first Elite Eight appearance since 1980, beating 11 seed New Mexico, 3 seed Baylor, and 2 seed Arizona before falling to 4-seed Alabama in the Elite Eight. Clemson's 2024 Elite Eight finish is Brownell's best as a head coach. Brownell also led Clemson to their second victory in Chapel Hill on February 6, 2024, defeating #3 UNC 80–76, and boasted ranked non-conference wins over in-state rival South Carolina and Alabama in the ACC–SEC Challenge, who would later end Clemson's season in the Elite Eight.

== Head coaching record ==
Record table
Season	Team	Overall	Conference	Standing	Postseason
UNC Wilmington Seahawks (Colonial Athletic Association) (2002–2006)
2002–03	UNC Wilmington	24–7	15–3	1st	NCAA Division I Round of 64
2003–04	UNC Wilmington	15–15	9–9	7th	
2004–05	UNC Wilmington	19–10	13–5	T–2nd	
2005–06	UNC Wilmington	25–8	15–3	T–1st	NCAA Division I Round of 64
UNC Wilmington:		83–40 (.675)	52–20 (.722)		
Wright State Raiders (Horizon League) (2006–2010)
2006–07	Wright State	23–10	13–3	T–1st	NCAA Division I Round of 64
2007–08	Wright State	21–10	12–6	3rd	
2008–09	Wright State	20–13	12–6	3rd	
2009–10	Wright State	20–12	12–6	2nd	
Wright State:		84–45 (.651)	49–21 (.700)		
Clemson Tigers (Atlantic Coast Conference) (2010–present)
2010–11	Clemson	22–12	9–7	T–4th	NCAA Division I Round of 64
2011–12	Clemson	16–15	8–8	7th	
2012–13	Clemson	13–18	5–13	11th	
2013–14	Clemson	23–13	10–8	6th	NIT Semifinal
2014–15	Clemson	16–15	8–10	T–9th	
2015–16	Clemson	17–14	10–8	T–7th	
2016–17	Clemson	17–16	6–12	12th	NIT First Round
2017–18	Clemson	25–10	11–7	T–3rd	NCAA Division I Sweet 16
2018–19	Clemson	20–14	9–9	T–8th	NIT Second Round
2019–20	Clemson	16–15	9–11	9th	Postseason Cancelled
2020–21	Clemson	16–8	10–6	T–5th	NCAA Division I Round of 64
2021–22	Clemson	17–16	8–12	10th	
2022–23	Clemson	23–11	14–6	T–3rd	NIT First Round
2023–24	Clemson	24–12	11–9	T–5th	NCAA Division I Elite Eight
2024–25	Clemson	27–7	18–2	T–2nd	NCAA Division I Round of 64
2025–26	Clemson	24–11	12–6	T–4th	NCAA Division I Round of 64
2026–27	Clemson	4–1	0–0		
Clemson:		320–208 (.606)	158–134 (.541)		
Total:		487–293 (.624)			
National champion Postseason invitational champion Conference regular season champion Conference regular season and conference tournament champion Division regular season champion Division regular season and conference tournament champion Conference tournament champion
