= 1983–84 Drexel Dragons men's basketball team =

American college basketball season

1983–84 Drexel Dragons men's basketball
- Conference: East Coast Conference
- Record: 17–12 (10–6 ECC)
- Head coach: Eddie Burke (7th season)
- Assistant coach: Pat Flannery (1st season)
- Home arena: Daskalakis Athletic Center

1983–84 ECC men's basketball standings
	Conf.				Overall
Team	W		L	PCT	W		L	PCT
Bucknell	14	–	2	.875	24	–	5	.828
Rider †	11	–	5	.688	20	–	11	.645
Drexel	10	–	6	.625	17	–	12	.586
Lafayette	9	–	7	.563	12	–	17	.414
Hofstra	9	–	7	.563	14	–	14	.500
Delaware	6	–	10	.375	11	–	16	.407
American	5	–	11	.313	6	–	22	.214
Towson	5	–	11	.313	10	–	19	.345
Lehigh	3	–	13	.188	4	–	23	.148
† 1984 ECC tournament winner Rankings from AP poll

The 1983–84 Drexel Dragons men's basketball team represented Drexel University during the 1983–84 NCAA Division I men's basketball season. The Dragons, led by 7th year head coach Eddie Burke, played their home games at the Daskalakis Athletic Center and were members of the East Coast Conference (ECC).

The team finished the season 17–12, and finished in 3rd place in the ECC in the regular season.

== Roster ==
1983–84 Drexel Dragons men's basketball team
Players	Coaches
Pos. / # / Name / Height / Weight / Year / Previous school / Hometown; / / / — / —	Head coach: Eddie Burke (La Salle); Assistant coach(es): Pat Flannery (Bucknell); Legend: (C) Team captain; (S) Suspended; (I) Ineligible; (W) Walk-on; Injured; Current redshirt

== Schedule ==
Date time, TV	Rank^{#}	Opponent^{#}	Result	Record	High points	High rebounds	High assists	Site (attendance) city, state
Regular season
November 28, 1983*		Temple	L 60–61	0–1	–	–	–	Daskalakis Athletic Center (2,500); Philadelphia, PA
December 1, 1983		at Delaware	W 72–55	1–1 (1–0)	–	–	–	Delaware Field House (1,047); Newark, DE
December 3, 1983		Lehigh	W 76–58	2–1 (2–0)	–	–	–	Daskalakis Athletic Center (1,125); Philadelphia, PA
December 6, 1983		at Bucknell	L 56–66	2–2 (2–1)	–	–	–	Davis Gym (1,800); Lewisburg, PA
December 17, 1983*		at East Carolina	W 53–51	3–2	–	–	–	Williams Arena at Minges Coliseum (1,200); Greenville, NC
December 19, 1983*		at Ball State; Cardinal Varsity Club Classic semifinals	L 55–60	3–3	–	–	–	Irving Gymnasium (2,350); Muncie, IN
December 20, 1983*		vs. Butler; Cardinal Varsity Club Classic 3rd place	W 70–67	4–3	–	–	–	Irving Gymnasium (1,725); Muncie, IN
January 4, 1984		Lafayette	W 61–58	5–3 (3–1)	–	–	–	Daskalakis Athletic Center (1,400); Philadelphia, PA
January 7, 1984		American	L 47–48	5–4 (3–2)	–	–	–	Daskalakis Athletic Center (1,290); Philadelphia, PA
January 9, 1984*		Niagara	W 64–55	6–4	–	–	–	Daskalakis Athletic Center (1,500); Philadelphia, PA
January 11, 1984		at Lehigh	W 65–54	7–4 (4–2)	–	–	–	Stabler Arena (302); Bethlehem, PA
January 14, 1984		at Towson State	W 69–57	8–4 (5–2)	–	–	–	Towson Center (541); Towson, MD
January 16, 1984*		at Saint Peter's	L 65–79	8–5	–	–	–	Yanitelli Center (1,000); Jersey City, NJ
January 21, 1984		at Lafayette	W 78–73	9–5 (6–2)	–	–	–	Kirby Sports Center (650); Easton, PA
January 23, 1984*		William & Mary	W 60–59	10–5	–	–	–	Daskalakis Athletic Center (1,900); Philadelphia, PA
January 25, 1984*		Vermont	W 71–66	11–5	–	–	–	Daskalakis Athletic Center (708); Philadelphia, PA
January 28, 1984*		at Maine	L 75–89	11–6	–	–	–	Alfond Arena (800); Orono, ME
February 1, 1984		at American	W 77–69	12–6 (7–2)	–	–	–	Fort Myer Ceremonial Hall (989); Arlington, VA
February 6, 1984*		at Loyola (MD)	L 87–95	12–7	–	–	–	Evergreen Gymnasium (856); Baltimore, MD
February 8, 1984		Rider	W 64–61	13–7 (8–2)	–	–	–	Daskalakis Athletic Center (1,450); Philadelphia, PA
February 11, 1984		Delaware	L 65–69	13–8 (8–3)	–	–	–	Daskalakis Athletic Center (1,000); Philadelphia, PA
February 13, 1986*		King's College (PA)	W 71–49	14–8	–	–	–	Daskalakis Athletic Center (500); Philadelphia, PA
February 15, 1984		Hofstra	W 65–47	15–8 (9–3)	–	–	–	Daskalakis Athletic Center (880); Philadelphia, PA
February 18, 1984		Towson	W 71–56	16–8 (10–3)	–	–	–	Daskalakis Athletic Center (943); Philadelphia, PA
February 18, 1984		Bucknell	L 58–66	16–9 (10–4)	–	–	–	Daskalakis Athletic Center (2,100); Philadelphia, PA
February 25, 1984		at Rider	L 53–78	16–10 (10–5)	–	–	–	Alumni Gym (1,625); Lawrenceville, NJ
March 2, 1984		at Hofstra	L 65–73 ^{OT}	16–11 (10–6)	–	–	–	Physical Fitness Center (2,300); Hempstead, NY
ECC Tournament
March 8, 1984	(3)	vs. (6) Delaware; Quarterfinal	W 82–72	17–11	–	–	–	Towson Center (346); Towson, MD
March 9, 1984	(3)	vs. (2) Rider; Semifinal	L 54–60	17–12	–	–	–	Towson Center (1,264); Towson, MD
*Non-conference game. ^{#}Rankings from AP. (#) Tournament seedings in parentheses. All times are in Eastern Time.

== Awards ==
Richard Congo

- ECC Player of the Year
- ECC All-Conference First Team

Michael Mitchell

- ECC All-Conference Second Team
