= 2002–03 William & Mary Tribe men's basketball team =

American college basketball season

2002–03 William & Mary Tribe men's basketball
- Conference: Colonial Athletic Association
- Record: 12–16 (7–11 CAA)
- Head coach: Rick Boyages (3rd season)
- Home arena: Kaplan Arena

2002–03 CAA men's basketball standings
	Conf.				Overall
Team	W		L	PCT	W		L	PCT
UNC Wilmington †	15	–	3	.833	24	–	7	.774
VCU	12	–	6	.667	18	–	10	.643
Drexel	12	–	6	.667	19	–	12	.613
George Mason	11	–	7	.611	16	–	12	.571
Delaware	9	–	9	.500	15	–	14	.517
Old Dominion	9	–	9	.500	12	–	15	.444
James Madison	8	–	10	.444	13	–	17	.433
William & Mary	7	–	11	.389	12	–	16	.429
Hofstra	6	–	12	.333	8	–	21	.276
Towson	1	–	17	.056	4	–	24	.143
† 2003 CAA tournament winner Rankings from AP poll

The 2002–03 William & Mary Tribe men's basketball team represented The College of William & Mary during the 2004–05 college basketball season. This was head coach Rick Boyages' third and final season at William & Mary. The Tribe competed in the Colonial Athletic Association and played their home games at Kaplan Arena. They finished the season 12–16, 7–11 in eighth place in CAA play and lost in the preliminary rounds of the 2003 CAA men's basketball tournament to Hofstra. They did not participate in any post-season tournaments.
