= 1994–95 Old Dominion Monarchs basketball team =

American college basketball season

1994–95 Old Dominion Monarchs basketball

CAA tournament & regular season champions

NCAA tournament, Second Round
- Conference: Colonial Athletic Association
- Record: 21–12 (12–2 CAA)
- Head coach: Jeff Capel II
- Home arena: Norfolk Scope; Hampton Coliseum (alternate)

1994–95 CAA men's basketball standings
	Conf.				Overall
Team	W		L	PCT	W		L	PCT
Old Dominion †	12	–	2	.857	21	–	12	.636
UNC Wilmington	10	–	4	.714	16	–	11	.593
James Madison	9	–	5	.643	16	–	13	.552
East Carolina	7	–	7	.500	18	–	11	.621
American	7	–	7	.500	9	–	19	.321
William & Mary	6	–	8	.429	8	–	19	.296
Richmond	3	–	11	.214	8	–	20	.286
George Mason	2	–	12	.143	7	–	20	.259
† 1995 CAA tournament winner Rankings from AP poll

The 1994–95 Old Dominion Monarchs basketball team represented Old Dominion University in the 1994–95 college basketball season. This was head coach Jeff Capel's first of seven seasons at Old Dominion. The Monarchs competed in the Colonial Athletic Association and played their home games at the off-campus Norfolk Scope in Norfolk, Virginia. They finished the season 21–12, 12–2 in CAA play to finish as regular season conference champions. They went on to win the 1995 CAA men's basketball tournament to earn the CAA's automatic bid to the NCAA tournament. They earned a 14 seed in the East Region where they upset No. 3 seed Villanova in the opening round. The Monarchs fell to No. 6 seed Tulsa in the second round.

== Roster ==
1994–95 Old Dominion Monarchs men's basketball team
Players
Coaches

Pos.	#	Name	Height	Weight	Year	Previous school	Hometown
F	4	Petey Sessoms	6 ft 8 in (2.03 m)	200 lb (91 kg)	Sr	Cradock	Portsmouth, Virginia
G	14	Mike Jones	6 ft 5 in (1.96 m)	—	Sr

Head coach

- Jeff Capel II

Assistant coach(es)

Legend

- (C) Team captain
- (S) Suspended
- (I) Ineligible
- (W) Walk-on
- Injured
- Current redshirt

== Schedule and results ==
Date time, TV	Rank^{#}	Opponent^{#}	Result	Record	Site (attendance) city, state
Exhibition
Nov 5, 1994*		Court Authority	L 119–127	–	Norfolk Scope; Norfolk, Virginia
Nov 9, 1994*		Croatia	L 94–95	–	Norfolk Scope; Norfolk, Virginia
Regular season
Nov 16, 1994*		at No. 14 Virginia	L 80–83	0–1	University Hall; Charlottesville, Virginia
Nov 26, 1994*		Towson	W 93–75	1–1	Norfolk Scope; Norfolk, Virginia
Nov 28, 1994*		South Carolina	W 79–65	2–1	Norfolk Scope; Norfolk, Virginia
Dec 3, 1994*		at Southern Illinois	L 74–88	2–2	SIU Arena; Carbondale, Illinois
Dec 5, 1994*		at Tulane	L 80–85	2–3	Avron B. Fogelman Arena; New Orleans, Louisiana
Dec 8, 1994*		New Hampshire	W 75–64	3–3	Norfolk Scope; Norfolk, Virginia
Dec 10, 1994*		Wyoming	W 63–61	4–3	Norfolk Scope; Norfolk, Virginia
Dec 16, 1994*		vs. Weber State	W 94–86 ^{OT}	5–3	Stan Sheriff Center; Honolulu, Hawaii
Dec 17, 1994*		at Hawaii	L 63–71	5–4	Stan Sheriff Center; Honolulu, Hawaii
Dec 22, 1994*		at Washington	L 61–71	5–5	Hec Edmundson Pavilion; Seattle, Washington
Dec 29, 1994*		No. 1 North Carolina	L 79–98	5–6	Norfolk Scope; Norfolk, Virginia
Jan 4, 1995*		at Saint Joseph's	L 82–92	5–7	Hagan Arena; Philadelphia, Pennsylvania
Jan 7, 1995*		at No. 15 Arizona State	L 52–71	5–8	Wells Fargo Arena; Tempe, Arizona
Jan 11, 1995		UNC Wilmington	W 79–66	6–8 (1–0)	Norfolk Scope; Norfolk, Virginia
Jan 14, 1995		at George Mason	W 88–83	7–8 (2–0)	Patriot Center; Fairfax, Virginia
Jan 18, 1995		at American	W 89–82	8–8 (3–0)	Bender Arena; Washington, D.C.
Jan 21, 1995		at William & Mary; Rivalry	W 83–73	9–8 (4–0)	Kaplan Arena; Williamsburg, Virginia
Jan 25, 1995		James Madison; Rivalry	W 79–65	10–8 (5–0)	Norfolk Scope; Norfolk, Virginia
Jan 28, 1995		at Richmond	W 65–46	11–8 (6–0)	Robins Center; Richmond, Virginia
Jan 31, 1995		East Carolina	W 69–66	12–8 (7–0)	Norfolk Scope; Norfolk, Virginia
Feb 4, 1995		at James Madison; Rivalry	L 79–95	12–9 (7–1)	JMU Convocation Center; Harrisonburg, Virginia
Feb 6, 1995*		vs. VCU; Rivalry	L 67–81	12–10	Hampton Coliseum; Hampton, Virginia
Feb 8, 1995		Richmond	W 70–60	13–10 (8–1)	Norfolk Scope; Norfolk, Virginia
Feb 11, 1995		American	W 91–74	14–10 (9–1)	Norfolk Scope; Norfolk, Virginia
Feb 13, 1995		George Mason	W 94–70	15–10 (10–1)	Norfolk Scope; Norfolk, Virginia
Feb 18, 1995		at UNC Wilmington	L 71–73	15–11 (10–2)	Trask Coliseum; Wilmington, North Carolina
Feb 20, 1995		at East Carolina	W 81–73	16–11 (11–2)	Minges Coliseum; Greenville, North Carolina
Feb 25, 1995		William & Mary; Rivalry	W 60–55	17–11 (12–2)	Norfolk Scope; Norfolk, Virginia
CAA tournament
Mar 4, 1995*	(1)	vs. (8) George Mason; Quarterfinals	W 110–94	18–11	Richmond Coliseum; Richmond, Virginia
Mar 5, 1995*	(1)	vs. (5) American; Semifinals	W 77–67 ^{OT}	19–11	Richmond Coliseum; Richmond, Virginia
Mar 6, 1995*	(1)	vs. (3) James Madison; Championship Game	W 80–75	20–11	Richmond Coliseum; Richmond, Virginia
NCAA tournament
Mar 17, 1995*	(14 E)	vs. (3 E) No. 9 Villanova; First Round	W 89–81 ^{3OT}	21–11	Times Union Center; Uniondale, New York
Mar 19, 1995*	(14 E)	vs. (6 E) Tulsa; Second Round	L 52–64	21–12	Times Union Center; Uniondale, New York
*Non-conference game. ^{#}Rankings from AP poll. (#) Tournament seedings in parentheses. E=East. All times are in Eastern Time.
