= 1983–84 Rider Broncs men's basketball team =

American college basketball season

1983–84 Rider Broncs men's basketball
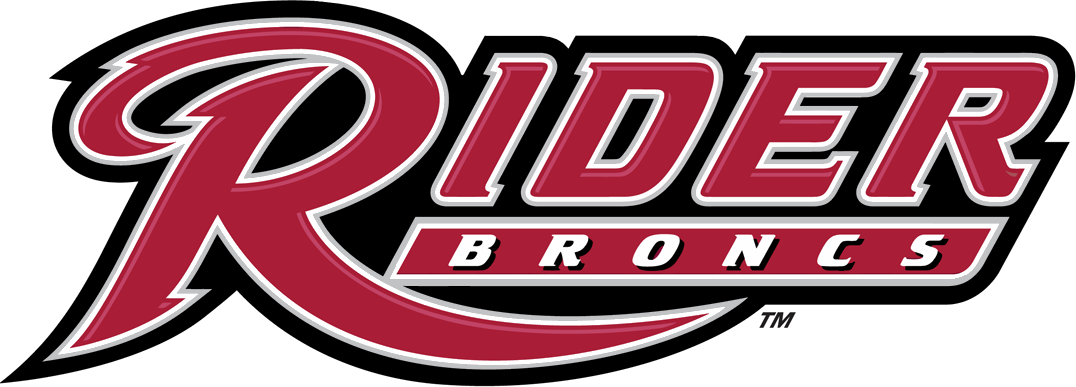

ECC tournament champions

NCAA tournament, Play-in Game
- Conference: East Coast Conference
- Record: 20–11 (11–5 ECC)
- Head coach: John Carpenter (9th season)
- Assistant coach: Fred Hill (1st season)
- Home arena: Alumni Gymnasium

1983–84 ECC men's basketball standings
	Conf.				Overall
Team	W		L	PCT	W		L	PCT
Bucknell	14	–	2	.875	24	–	5	.828
Rider †	11	–	5	.688	20	–	11	.645
Drexel	10	–	6	.625	17	–	12	.586
Lafayette	9	–	7	.563	12	–	17	.414
Hofstra	9	–	7	.563	14	–	14	.500
Delaware	6	–	10	.375	11	–	16	.407
American	5	–	11	.313	6	–	22	.214
Towson	5	–	11	.313	10	–	19	.345
Lehigh	3	–	13	.188	4	–	23	.148
† 1984 ECC tournament winner Rankings from AP poll

The 1983–84 Rider Broncs men's basketball team represented Rider University in the 1983–84 NCAA Division I men's basketball season. The Broncs, led by ninth-year head coach John Carpenter, played their home games at the Alumni Gymnasium in Lawrenceville, New Jersey as members of the East Coast Conference. They finished the season 20–11, 11–5 in ECC play to finish in second place. In the ECC tournament, they defeated No. 7 seed American, No. 3 seed Drexel, and top seed Bucknell (in OT) to win the tournament and earn the first bid to the NCAA Tournament in program history. As one of two No. 12 seeds in the East region of the 1984 NCAA tournament, the Broncs were defeated by Richmond, 89–65, in the play-in round.

== Roster ==
1983–84 Rider Broncs men's basketball team
Players
Coaches

Pos.	#	Name	Height	Weight	Year	Previous school	Hometown
F		Derrick Lamar	6 ft 6 in (1.98 m)	—	Jr
C		Kevin Thomas	6 ft 8 in (2.03 m)	—	Sr	Howard

Head coach

- John Carpenter (Penn State)

Assistant coach(es)

- Fred Hill (Montclair State)

Legend

- (C) Team captain
- (S) Suspended
- (I) Ineligible
- (W) Walk-on
- Injured
- Current redshirt

Roster

== Schedule and results ==
Date time, TV	Rank^{#}	Opponent^{#}	Result	Record	Site (attendance) city, state
Regular season
Nov 26, 1983*		at Alabama	L 50–70	0–1	Coleman Coliseum; Tuscaloosa, Alabama
Nov 28, 1983*		at James Madison	W 76–68	1–1	JMU Convocation Center; Harrisonburg, Virginia
Dec 7, 1983*		at Rutgers	L 62–63	1–2	Louis Brown Athletic Center; Piscataway, New Jersey
Dec 9, 1983*		vs. Colgate	W 61–58	2–2	
Dec 10, 1983*		at Marist	L 64–67	2–3	McCann Recreation Center; Poughkeepsie, New York
Dec 26, 1983*		vs. Lafayette	W 92–71	3–3	
Dec 28, 1983*		vs. George Mason	L 61–63	3–4	
Mar 3, 1984		Delaware	W 69–66	17–10 (11–5)	Alumni Gymnasium; Lawrenceville, New Jersey
MAAC tournament
Mar 8, 1984*		vs. American; Quarterfinals	W 49–47	18–10	Towson Center; Towson, Maryland
Mar 9, 1984*		vs. Drexel; Semifinals	W 60–54	19–10	Towson Center; Towson, Maryland
Mar 10, 1984*		vs. Bucknell; Championship game	W 73–71 ^{OT}	20–10	Towson Center; Towson, Maryland
NCAA tournament
Mar 13, 1984*	(12 E)	vs. (12 E) Richmond; Play-in game	L 65–89	20–11	The Palestra; Philadelphia, Pennsylvania
*Non-conference game. ^{#}Rankings from AP Poll. (#) Tournament seedings in parentheses. E=East. All times are in Eastern.
