= 1985 ECAC South men's basketball tournament =

- Classification: Division I
- Season: 1984–85
- Teams: 8
- Site: William & Mary Hall; Williamsburg, VA
- Champions: Navy (1st title)
- Winning coach: Paul Evans (1st title)
- MVP: Vernon Butler (Navy)
- ECAC South men's basketball tournaments

1984–85 ECAC South men's basketball standings
	Conf.				Overall
Team	W		L	PCT	W		L	PCT
Navy †	11	–	3	.786	26	–	6	.813
Richmond	11	–	3	.786	21	–	11	.656
George Mason	10	–	4	.714	18	–	11	.621
William & Mary	9	–	5	.643	16	–	12	.571
James Madison	7	–	7	.500	14	–	14	.500
UNC Wilmington	4	–	10	.286	12	–	16	.429
American	3	–	11	.214	9	–	19	.321
East Carolina	1	–	13	.071	7	–	21	.250
† 1985 ECAC South tournament winner Rankings from AP Poll

The 1985 ECAC South men's basketball tournament (now known as the Coastal Athletic Association men's basketball tournament) was held March 7–9 at William & Mary Hall in Williamsburg, Virginia.

Navy defeated Richmond in the championship game, 85–76, to win their first ECAC South men's basketball tournament. The Midshipmen, therefore, earn an automatic bid to the 1985 NCAA tournament. This was Navy's first NCAA tournament appearance since 1960.

This was the first ECAC South (CAA) Tournament for American and UNC Wilmington.

== Bracket ==
Quarterfinals; Thursday, March 8
1	Navy	94
8	East Carolina	73
5	James Madison	61
4	William & Mary	68
3	George Mason	70
6	UNC Wilmington	67
7	American	68
2	Richmond	74

Semifinals; Friday, March 9
1	Navy	89
4	William & Mary	83
3	George Mason	64
2	Richmond	77

Championship; Saturday, March 10
1	Navy	85
2	Richmond	76
