= Petey Sessoms =

American basketball player (born 1972)

Personal information
- Born: June 10, 1972 (age 54) Portsmouth, Virginia
- Listed height: 6 ft 8 in (2.03 m)
- Listed weight: 200 lb (91 kg)

Career information
- High school: Cradock (Portsmouth, Virginia)
- College: Old Dominion (1991–1995)
- NBA draft: 1995: undrafted
- Playing career: 1995–2004
- Position: Small forward

Career history
- 1995–1996: Ironi Ramat Gan
- 1997–1998: Njarðvík
- 2002–2003: Elitzur Kiryat Ata
- 2003–2004: Ramat Hasharon/Haifa

Career highlights
- Icelandic champion (1998); CAA Player of the Year (1995); 3× First-team All-CAA (1993–1995); CAA tournament MVP (1995); CAA All-Rookie Team (1992)

Petey Sessoms (born June 10, 1972) is an American retired professional basketball player. He played in six countries in his career that spanned between 1995–96 and 2003–04. He is best known in the United States for his college career at Old Dominion University in which he was named the Colonial Athletic Association Men's Basketball Player of the Year as a senior in 1994–95.

== College ==
Sessoms, a native of Portsmouth, Virginia, played for the Monarchs in nearby Norfolk. He scored 1,985 points (the fourth most in school history at the time), grabbed 779 rebounds and shot 81.9% from the free throw line. In each of his four seasons, Old Dominion qualified for postseason tournaments. These included the 1992 and 1995 NCAA Tournaments as well as the 1993 and 1994 National Invitation Tournaments. Sessoms and teammate Odell Hodge, who was a two-time CAA Player of the Year himself, guided Old Dominion to three straight regular season conference championships (1993–95) as well as two CAA men's basketball tournament championships (1992 and 1995). Sessoms was named the 1995 CAA Player of the Year as well as that year's CAA Tournament MVP behind his team-leading 22.1 points per game and still-standing school record 730 total points. In the first round of that year's NCAA Tournament, Sessoms scored 35 points in a triple-overtime win versus #3 seed and Big East champion Villanova. The Monarchs would go on to lose their next game, however. At the end of the year, Sessoms was also given Honorable Mention All-America status by numerous sports media outlets.

== Professional and personal life ==
After his lauded college career, Sessoms did not get any interest from NBA teams, so he went to Europe to play professional basketball. He spent the next nine years playing for various clubs in Portugal, Belgium, Israel, Iceland, France and Poland. In 2004, he retired from basketball and began working for the United States Postal Service in North Hollywood, California. As of August 2010, he continues to work there as a supervisor. He's married to Bridgette Wright a producer in the entertainment industry and has two sons, Paul “PJ” Sessoms, Jr. and Brixton Sessoms.
