= 2002–03 George Mason Patriots men's basketball team =

American college basketball season

2002–03 George Mason Patriots men's basketball
- Conference: Colonial Athletic Association
- Record: 16–12 (11–7 CAA)
- Head coach: Jim Larranaga
- Assistant coaches: Bill Courtney; Mike Gillian; Eric Konkol
- Home arena: Patriot Center

2002–03 CAA men's basketball standings
	Conf.				Overall
Team	W		L	PCT	W		L	PCT
UNC Wilmington †	15	–	3	.833	24	–	7	.774
VCU	12	–	6	.667	18	–	10	.643
Drexel	12	–	6	.667	19	–	12	.613
George Mason	11	–	7	.611	16	–	12	.571
Delaware	9	–	9	.500	15	–	14	.517
Old Dominion	9	–	9	.500	12	–	15	.444
James Madison	8	–	10	.444	13	–	17	.433
William & Mary	7	–	11	.389	12	–	16	.429
Hofstra	6	–	12	.333	8	–	21	.276
Towson	1	–	17	.056	4	–	24	.143
† 2003 CAA tournament winner Rankings from AP poll

The 2002–03 George Mason Patriots men's basketball team began their 37th season of collegiate play on November 22, 2002, versus Central Michigan University. The Patriots finished the season with a record of 16 wins and 12 losses.

In the CAA tournament, George Mason lost to Delaware in the quarterfinals. They were selected to the 2004 National Invitation Tournament, where they lost to the Oregon Ducks in the second round of the tournament.

== Awards ==
First Team All-CAA

- Jesse Young

CAA All-Defensive Team

- Jon Larranaga

CAA All-Rookie Team

- Jai Lewis

== Roster ==
2002–03 George Mason Patriots men's basketball team
Players
Coaches

Pos.	#	Name	Height	Weight	Year	Previous school	Hometown
F	41	Deon Cooper	6 ft 9 in (2.06 m)	235 lb (107 kg)	Jr	Columbia Central	Columbia, TN
G	24	Mark Davis	6 ft 5 in (1.96 m)	200 lb (91 kg)	Fr	Robert E. Lee/Palm Beach C.C.	Springfield, VA
G	23	Kevin Harris	6 ft 3 in (1.91 m)	180 lb (82 kg)	Fr	Falls Church	Fairfax, VA
G	4	Raoul Heinen	6 ft 5 in (1.96 m)	200 lb (91 kg)	Jr	Bunschoten, Netherlands
F	2	Jon Larranaga	6 ft 7 in (2.01 m)	230 lb (104 kg)	Sr	Saint John's Catholic Prep	Oakton, VA
F	55	Jai Lewis	6 ft 7 in (2.01 m)	275 lb (125 kg)	Fr	Aberdeen	Aberdeen, MD
G	24	Charles Makings	6 ft 2 in (1.88 m)	210 lb (95 kg)	Fr	St. John's College	Silver Spring, MD
G	12	Richard Tynes	6 ft 4 in (1.93 m)	205 lb (93 kg)	Jr	St. John's College	Washington, D.C.
F	35	Trent Wurtz	6 ft 8 in (2.03 m)	220 lb (100 kg)	Fr	Sheboygan North	Sheboygan, WI
F	33	Colin Wyatt	6 ft 9 in (2.06 m)	240 lb (109 kg)	So	Jamestown	Williamsburg, VA
F	3	Jesse Young	6 ft 10 in (2.08 m)	250 lb (113 kg)	Sr	Peterborough, Ontario

Head coach

- Jim Larranaga (Providence)

Assistant coach(es)

- Scott Cherry (North Carolina)
- James Johnson (Ferrum)
- Chris Caputo (Westfield)

Legend

- (C) Team captain
- (S) Suspended
- (I) Ineligible
- (W) Walk-on
- Injured
- Current redshirt

Roster
Last update: 2010-07-27

== Player stats ==
Player	Games	MPG	PPG	RPG	FG %	3P%	FT %	Assists	Steals
Jai Lewis	33	27.6	14.5	7.5	.597	.000	.652	38	36
Mark Davis	31	24.8	12.9	3.6	.444	.326	.610	41	53
Lamar Butler	30	25.5	10.5	2.5	.381	.377	.825	54	23
Terry Reynolds	31	28.0	15.4	2.6	.316	.299	.721	158	45
Tony Skinn	32	19.1	8.2	2.1	.391	.341	.727	39	28
Raoul Heinen	33	27.8	6.8	3.7	.405	.290	.809	61	29
Kevin Mickens	33	16.5	4.7	2.8	.508	.000	.554	12	14
Trent Wurtz	31	17.3	3.5	3.5	.432	.281	.680	16	23
Jesus Urbina	29	9.4	2.3	2.2	.538	.000	.688	8	10
Richard Tynes	21	9.1	2.1	2.0	.487	.000	.545	5	9
Tim Burns	9	2.4	1.8	0.3	.500	.375	.750	0	1
Gabe Norwood	29	8.4	1.0	0.8	.306	.308	.500	22	10
Deon Cooper	11	3.6	0.5	0.7	.600	.000	.000	1	0
Makan Konate	6	1.8	0.0	0.3	.000	.000	.000	0	0

== Game log ==
Date time, TV	Rank^{#}	Opponent^{#}	Result	Record	Site city, state
November 21*		Morehead State	W 95–82	1–0	Patriot Center; Fairfax, VA
November 25*		at No. 24 Maryland	L 79–64	1–1	Cole Field House; College Park, MD
November 29*		at Iona	W 92–83	2–1	New Rochelle, NY
December 2*		East Carolina	W 76–65	3–1	Patriot Center; Fairfax, VA
December 4*		at Hartford	W 79–58	4–1	Chase Arena at Reich Family Pavilion; Hartford, CT
December 7*		at No. 10 North Carolina	L 115–81	4–2	Dean Smith Center; Chapel Hill, NC
December 18*		McNeese State	W 96–63	5–2	Patriot Center; Fairfax, VA
December 20*		at Duquesne	W 80–70	6–2	A. J. Palumbo Center; Pittsburgh, PA
December 23*		St. Bonaventure	W 69–55	7–2	Patriot Center; Fairfax, VA
January 3		Towson	W 71–62	8–2 (1–0)	Patriot Center; Fairfax, VA
January 7		Old Dominion	L 74–71	8–3 (1–1)	Patriot Center; Fairfax, VA
January 10		at William & Mary	W 84–71	9–3 (2–1)	William & Mary Hall; Williamsburg, VA
January 14		Hofstra	W 84–76	10–3 (3–1)	Patriot Center; Fairfax, VA
January 17		at VCU	L 80–56	10–4 (3–2)	Alltel Pavilion; Richmond, VA
January 21		at UNC Wilmington	W 64–62 ^{OT}	11–4 (4–2)	Trask Coliseum; Wilmington, NC
January 24		James Madison	W 74–70	12–4 (5–2)	Patriot Center; Fairfax, VA
January 26		at Drexel	L 83–65	12–5 (5–3)	Daskalakis Athletic Center; Philadelphia, PA
January 28		at Delaware	L 74–65	12–6 (5–4)	Bob Carpenter Center; Newark, DE
January 31		William & Mary	W 78–62	13–6 (6–4)	Patriot Center; Fairfax, VA
February 4		at Towson	W 74–57	14–6 (7–4)	Towson Center; Towson, MD
February 7		at James Madison	L 72–64	14–7 (7–5)	JMU Convocation Center; Harrisonburg, VA
February 11		VCU	W 69–57	15–7 (8–5)	Patriot Center; Fairfax, VA
February 14		Drexel	W 75–72 ^{OT}	16–7 (9–5)	Patriot Center; Fairfax, VA
February 18		at Hofstra	L 67–57	16–8 (9–6)	Hofstra Arena; Hempstead, NY
February 21		Delaware	W 75–61	17–8 (10–6)	Patriot Center; Fairfax, VA
February 25		UNC Wilmington	W 59–46	18–8 (11–6)	Daskalakis Athletic Center; Philadelphia, PA
February 28		at Old Dominion	W 70–66	19–8 (12–6)	Constant Convocation Center; Norfolk, VA
March 6		vs. Delaware; CAA Tournament Quarterfinals	W 65–58 ^{OT}	20–8	Richmond Coliseum; Richmond, VA
March 7		vs. UNC Wilmington; CAA Tournament Semifinals	W 80–66	21–8	Richmond Coliseum; Richmond, VA
March 8		vs. VCU; CAA Tournament Finals	L 55–54	21–9	Richmond Coliseum; Richmond, VA
March 17		Tennessee; NIT Opening Round	W 58–55	22–9	Patriot Center; Fairfax, VA
March 19		Austin Peay; NIT First Round	W 66–60	23–9	Patriot Center; Fairfax, VA
March 23		at Oregon; NIT Second Round	L 68–54	23–10	McArthur Court; Eugene, OR
*Non-conference game. ^{#}Rankings from Coaches' Poll. (#) Tournament seedings in parentheses. All times are in Eastern Time.

== Recruits ==
The following is a list of commitments George Mason has received for the 2004–2005 season:

- Folarin Campbell
- Jordan Carter
- Will Thomas
- John Vaughan
