= 1986 CAA men's basketball tournament =

Colonial athletic association

- Classification: Division I
- Season: 1985–86
- Teams: 8
- Site: Patriot Center; Fairfax, VA
- Champions: Navy (2nd title)
- Winning coach: Paul Evans (2nd title)
- MVP: David Robinson (Navy)

1985–86 CAA men's basketball standings
	Conf.				Overall
Team	W		L	PCT	W		L	PCT
No. 17 Navy †	13	–	1	.929	30	–	5	.857
Richmond	12	–	2	.857	23	–	7	.767
George Mason	10	–	4	.714	20	–	12	.625
UNC Wilmington	6	–	8	.429	16	–	13	.552
East Carolina	6	–	8	.429	12	–	16	.429
American	3	–	11	.214	10	–	18	.357
William & Mary	3	–	11	.214	8	–	20	.286
James Madison	3	–	11	.214	5	–	23	.179
† 1986 CAA tournament winner Rankings from AP Poll

The 1986 Colonial Athletic Association men's basketball tournament was held February 28 – March 3, 1986 at the Patriot Center in Fairfax, Virginia.

Navy defeated George Mason in the championship game, 72–61, to win their second consecutive CAA/ECAC South men's basketball tournament. The Midshipmen, therefore, earned an automatic bid to the 1986 NCAA tournament.

Second-seeded Richmond also qualified for the NCAA tournament, receiving an at-large bid.

== Bracket ==
Quarterfinals; Wednesday, February 28; Thursday, March 1
1	#19 Navy	81
8	James Madison	67
5	East Carolina	54
4	UNC Wilmington	75
3	George Mason	68
6	American	60
7	William & Mary	50
2	Richmond	61

Semifinals; Friday, March 2
1	#19 Navy	62
4	UNC Wilmington	60
3	George Mason	62
2	Richmond	60

Championship; Saturday, March 3
1	#19 Navy	72
3	George Mason	61
