= 1984 ECAC South men's basketball tournament =

- Classification: Division I
- Season: 1983–84
- Teams: 6
- Site: JMU Convocation Center; Harrisonburg, VA
- Champions: Richmond (1st title)
- Winning coach: Dick Tarrant (1st title)
- MVP: Johnny Newman (Richmond)
- ECAC South men's basketball tournaments

1983–84 ECAC South men's basketball standings
	Conf.				Overall
Team	W		L	PCT	W		L	PCT
Richmond †	7	–	3	.700	22	–	10	.688
Navy	6	–	4	.600	24	–	8	.750
William & Mary	6	–	4	.600	14	–	14	.500
George Mason	5	–	5	.500	21	–	7	.750
James Madison	5	–	5	.500	15	–	14	.517
East Carolina	1	–	9	.100	4	–	24	.143
† 1984 ECAC South tournament winner Rankings from AP Poll

The 1984 ECAC South men's basketball tournament (now known as the Coastal Athletic Association men's basketball tournament) was held March 8–10 at the JMU Convocation Center in Harrisonburg, Virginia.

Richmond defeated Navy in the championship game, 74–55, to win their first ECAC South men's basketball tournament and, therefore, earn an automatic bid to the 1984 NCAA tournament. This was Richmond's first-ever bid to the NCAA tournament.

== Bracket ==
Quarterfinals; Thursday, March 8
4	George Mason	56
5	James Madison	63
3	William & Mary	47
6	East Carolina	32

Semifinals; Friday, March 9
1	Richmond	65
5	James Madison	57
3	William & Mary	57
2	Navy	67

Championship; Saturday, March 10
1	Richmond	74
2	Navy	55
