= 2002–03 Drexel Dragons men's basketball team =

American college basketball season

2002–03 Drexel Dragons men's basketball

NIT tournament Opening Round, L 59–68
- Conference: Colonial Athletic Association
- Record: 19–12 (12–6 CAA)
- Head coach: Bruiser Flint (2nd season)
- Assistant coaches: Geoff Arnold (2nd season); Chuck Martin (2nd season); Mike Connors (2nd season)
- Captain: Robert Battle
- Home arena: Daskalakis Athletic Center

2002–03 CAA men's basketball standings
	Conf.				Overall
Team	W		L	PCT	W		L	PCT
UNC Wilmington †	15	–	3	.833	24	–	7	.774
VCU	12	–	6	.667	18	–	10	.643
Drexel	12	–	6	.667	19	–	12	.613
George Mason	11	–	7	.611	16	–	12	.571
Delaware	9	–	9	.500	15	–	14	.517
Old Dominion	9	–	9	.500	12	–	15	.444
James Madison	8	–	10	.444	13	–	17	.433
William & Mary	7	–	11	.389	12	–	16	.429
Hofstra	6	–	12	.333	8	–	21	.276
Towson	1	–	17	.056	4	–	24	.143
† 2003 CAA tournament winner Rankings from AP poll

The 2002–03 Drexel Dragons men's basketball team represented Drexel University during the 2002–03 NCAA Division I men's basketball season. The Dragons, led by 2nd year head coach Bruiser Flint, played their home games at the Daskalakis Athletic Center and were members of the Colonial Athletic Association (CAA).

The team finished the season 19–12, and finished in 3rd place in the CAA in the regular season.

== Roster ==
2002–03 Drexel Dragons men's basketball team
Players
Coaches

Pos.	#	Name	Height	Weight	Year	Previous school	Hometown
F	23	Robert Battle (C)	6 ft 8 in (2.03 m)	230 lb (104 kg)	Sr	Northeast HS	Philadelphia, PA
G	32	Phil Goss	6 ft 1 in (1.85 m)	175 lb (79 kg)	So	Oxon Hill HS	Temple Hills, MD
			—	—

Head coach

- Bruiser Flint (Saint Joseph's)

Assistant coach(es)

- Geoff Arnold (Saint Joseph's)
- Chuck Martin (South Carolina)
- Mike Connors (Ithaca)

Legend

- (C) Team captain
- (S) Suspended
- (I) Ineligible
- (W) Walk-on
- Injured
- Current redshirt

== Schedule ==
Date time, TV	Rank^{#}	Opponent^{#}	Result	Record	High points	High rebounds	High assists	Site (attendance) city, state
Regular season
November 22, 2002*; 7:30 pm		at Villanova	L 41–64	0–1	–	–	–	The Pavilion (6,500); Villanova, PA
November 25, 2002*; 7:00 pm		at Penn; Battle of 33rd Street	W 71–62	1–1	–	–	–	Palestra (4,128); Philadelphia, PA
November 30, 2002*; 7:00 pm		at Monmouth	W 73–68	2–1	–	–	–	William T. Boylan Gymnasium (1,953); West Long Branch, NJ
December 3, 2002*; 7:30 pm		at Lafayette	W 65–47	3–1	–	–	–	Kirby Sports Center (1,851); Easton, PA
December 7, 2002*; 1:00 pm		vs. Saint Joseph's; Big 5 Classic	L 37–50	3–2	–	–	–	Palestra (8,722); Philadelphia, PA
December 15, 2002		at Quinnipiac	L 78–81	3–3	–	–	–	Burt Kahn Court (1,200); Hamden, CT
December 21, 2002*; 4:00 pm		at Niagara	L 72–88	3–4	–	–	–	Gallagher Center (1,231); Lewiston, NY
December 23, 2002*; 7:00 pm		Colgate	W 75–54	4–4	–	–	–	Daskalakis Athletic Center (1,248); Philadelphia, PA
December 28, 2002*; 4:00 pm		Philadelphia University	W 78–61	5–4	–	–	–	Daskalakis Athletic Center (989); Philadelphia, PA
CAA Regular season
January 2, 2003; 7:00 pm		at James Madison	W 82–62	6–4 (1–0)	–	–	–	JMU Convocation Center (3,079); Harrisonburg, VA
January 4, 2003		at George Mason	L 53–75	6–5 (1–1)	–	–	–	Patriot Center (2,110); Fairfax, VA
January 8, 2003		at Virginia Commonwealth	W 74–73	7–5 (2–1)	–	–	–	Siegel Center (3,094); Richmond, VA
January 11, 2003		UNC Wilmington	L 86–88 ^{OT}	7–6 (2–2)	–	–	–	Daskalakis Athletic Center (2,289); Philadelphia, PA
January 15, 2003		William & Mary	W 67–51	8–6 (3–2)	–	–	–	Daskalakis Athletic Center (1,789); Philadelphia, PA
January 18, 2003		Towson	W 85–56	9–6 (4–2)	–	–	–	Daskalakis Athletic Center (1,803); Philadelphia, PA
January 23, 2003		at Delaware	W 83–78 ^{OT}	10–6 (5–2)	–	–	–	Bob Carpenter Center (4,591); Newark, DE
January 25, 2003		Hofstra	W 78–66	11–6 (6–2)	–	–	–	Daskalakis Athletic Center (1,938); Philadelphia, PA
January 29, 2003		Old Dominion	L 69–72	11–7 (6–3)	–	–	–	Daskalakis Athletic Center (1,839); Philadelphia, PA
February 1, 2003		at UNC Wilmington	L 56–77	11–8 (6–4)	–	–	–	Trask Coliseum (6,100); Wilmington, NC
February 5, 2003		at Hofstra	W 82–76	12–8 (7–4)	–	–	–	Mack Sports Complex (1,730); Hempstead, NY
February 8, 2003		at Towson	W 76–50	13–8 (8–4)	–	–	–	Towson Center (1,294); Towson, MD
February 12, 2003		Virginia Commonwealth	L 59–72	13–9 (8–5)	–	–	–	Daskalakis Athletic Center (1,386); Philadelphia, PA
February 15, 2003		James Madison	W 78–67	14–9 (9–5)	–	–	–	Daskalakis Athletic Center (1,483); Philadelphia, PA
February 19, 2003		at Old Dominion	W 62–57	15–9 (10–5)	–	–	–	Ted Constant Convocation Center (5,610); Norfolk, VA
February 22, 2003		at William & Mary	W 78–62	16–9 (11–5)	–	–	–	Kaplan Arena (1,959); Williamsburg, VA
February 26, 2003		Delaware	W 70–56	17–9 (12–5)	–	–	–	Daskalakis Athletic Center (2,187); Philadelphia, PA
March 1, 2003		George Mason	L 55–57	17–10 (12–6)	–	–	–	Daskalakis Athletic Center (2,291); Philadelphia, PA
CAA tournament
March 8, 2003; 8:30 pm	(3)	vs. (6) Old Dominion; Quarterfinals	W 61–52	18–10	–	–	–	Richmond Coliseum (5,327); Richmond, VA
March 9, 2003; 5:30 pm	(3)	vs. (2) Virginia Commonwealth; Semifinals	W 62–60	19–10	–	–	–	Richmond Coliseum (4,878); Richmond, VA
March 10, 2003; 7:00 pm	(3)	vs. (1) UNC Wilmington; Championship	L 62–70	19–11	25 – Battle	–	–	Richmond Coliseum (4,788); Richmond, VA
NIT
March 18, 2003; 7:30 pm		at Temple; Opening Round	L 59–68	19–12	–	–	–	Liacouras Center (3,601); Philadelphia, PA
*Non-conference game. ^{#}Rankings from AP. (#) Tournament seedings in parentheses. All times are in Eastern Time.

== Awards ==
Robert Battle

- CAA Defensive Player of the Year
- CAA All-Conference First Team
- CAA All-Defensive Team
- CAA All-Tournament Team
- CAA Player of the Week
- CAA Dean Ehlers Leadership Award

Kenell Sanchez

- CAA All-Tournament Team

Eric Schmieder

- CAA All-Conference Second Team
