= 1983–84 Richmond Spiders men's basketball team =

American college basketball season

1983–84 Richmond Spiders men's basketball

ECAC South Regular Season Champions ECAC South tournament champions

NCAA tournament, Second round
- Conference: ECAC South
- Record: 22–10 (7–3 ECAC South)
- Head coach: Dick Tarrant (3rd season)
- Captains: Bill Flye; Kelvin Johnson
- Home arena: Robins Center

1983–84 ECAC South men's basketball standings
	Conf.				Overall
Team	W		L	PCT	W		L	PCT
Richmond †	7	–	3	.700	22	–	10	.688
Navy	6	–	4	.600	24	–	8	.750
William & Mary	6	–	4	.600	14	–	14	.500
George Mason	5	–	5	.500	21	–	7	.750
James Madison	5	–	5	.500	15	–	14	.517
East Carolina	1	–	9	.100	4	–	24	.143
† 1984 ECAC South tournament winner Rankings from AP Poll

The 1983–84 Richmond Spiders men's basketball team represented the University of Richmond in National Collegiate Athletic Association (NCAA) Division I college basketball during the 1983–84 season. Richmond competed as a member of the ECAC South (now known as the Colonial Athletic Association) under head basketball coach Dick Tarrant and played its home games at the Robins Center.

Richmond finished first in the ECAC South regular-season standings with a 7–3 conference record, and won the ECAC South tournament to earn an automatic bid to the 1984 NCAA tournament. One of two teams assigned the No. 12 seed, Richmond secured a victory over Rider in the preliminary round, 89-65. In the opening round, the Spiders upset No. 5 seed Auburn, 72–71. Richmond lost to No. 4 seed Indiana, 75–67, in the round of 32.

== Roster ==
1983–84 Richmond Spiders men's basketball team
Players	Coaches
Pos. / # / Name / Height / Weight / Year / Previous school / Hometown; G / 20 / Johnny Newman / 6 ft 7 in (2.01 m) / 180 lb (82 kg) / So / George Washington HS / Danville, Virginia	Head coach: Dick Tarrant; Assistant coach(es) Legend: (C) Team captain; (S) Suspended; (I) Ineligible; (W) Walk-on; Injured; Current redshirt

== Schedule and results ==
Date time, TV	Rank^{#}	Opponent^{#}	Result	Record	Site city, state
Regular season
Nov 25, 1983*		vs. George Mason	L 68–78	0–1	
Nov 26, 1983*		vs. Lafayette	W 65–49	1–1	
Dec 3, 1983*		at East Tennessee State	W 65–56	2–1	Memorial Center; Johnson City, Tennessee
ECAC South tournament
Mar 9, 1984*		at James Madison; Semifinals	W 65–57	19–9	JMU Convocation Center; Harrisonburg, Virginia
Mar 10, 1984*		vs. Navy; Championship game	W 74–55	20–9	JMU Convocation Center; Harrisonburg, Virginia
NCAA Tournament
Mar 13, 1984*	(12 E)	vs. (12 E) Rider; Preliminary round	W 89–65	19–9	Palestra; Philadelphia, Pennsylvania
Mar 15, 1984*	(12 E)	vs. (5 E) Auburn; First round	W 72–71	22–9	Charlotte Coliseum; Charlotte, North Carolina
Mar 17, 1984*	(12 E)	vs. (4 E) Indiana; Second round	L 67–75	22–10	Charlotte Coliseum; Charlotte, North Carolina
*Non-conference game. ^{#}Rankings from AP poll. (#) Tournament seedings in parentheses. E=East. All times are in Eastern.

== Awards and honors ==
- Johnny Newman – ECAC South Player of the Year
