= 1985–86 Navy Midshipmen men's basketball team =

American college basketball season

1985–86 Navy Midshipmen men's basketball

CAA tournament champions CAA regular season champions

NCAA men's Division I tournament, Elite Eight
- Conference: Colonial Athletic Association

Ranking
- AP: No. 17
- Record: 30–5 (13–1 CAA)
- Head coach: Paul Evans (6th season)
- Assistant coach: Pete Herrmann (6th season)
- Home arena: Halsey Field House

1985–86 CAA men's basketball standings
	Conf.				Overall
Team	W		L	PCT	W		L	PCT
No. 17 Navy †	13	–	1	.929	30	–	5	.857
Richmond	12	–	2	.857	23	–	7	.767
George Mason	10	–	4	.714	20	–	12	.625
UNC Wilmington	6	–	8	.429	16	–	13	.552
East Carolina	6	–	8	.429	12	–	16	.429
American	3	–	11	.214	10	–	18	.357
William & Mary	3	–	11	.214	8	–	20	.286
James Madison	3	–	11	.214	5	–	23	.179
† 1986 CAA tournament winner Rankings from AP Poll

The 1985–86 Navy Midshipmen men's basketball team represented the United States Naval Academy during the 1985–86 NCAA Division I men's basketball season. The Midshipmen were led by sixth-year head coach Paul Evans, and played their home games at Halsey Field House in Annapolis, Maryland as members of the Colonial Athletic Association.

Behind Consensus Second-Team All-American David Robinson, the team won the CAA regular-season (13–1) and conference tournament titles, made a run to the Elite Eight of the NCAA tournament, and finished with an overall record of 30–5.

== Roster ==
1985–86 Navy Midshipmen men's basketball team
Players
Coaches

Pos.	#	Name	Height	Weight	Year	Previous school	Hometown
G	5	Kylor Whitaker	6 ft 6 in (1.98 m)	195 lb (88 kg)	Sr	Lebanon	Lebanon, Oregon
G	10	Doug Wojcik	6 ft 1 in (1.85 m)	180 lb (82 kg)	Jr	Wheeling Central Catholic	Wheeling, West Virginia
G	22	Brian Gregory	5 ft 9 in (1.75 m)	150 lb (68 kg)	Fr	Hersey	Mount Prospect, Illinois
G	24	Derric Turner	6 ft 6 in (1.98 m)	195 lb (88 kg)	Fr	Lake Braddock	Burke, Virginia
F	40	Carl Liebert	6 ft 6 in (1.98 m)	205 lb (93 kg)	Jr	Floyd Central	Floyds Knobs, Indiana
F	44	Cliff Rees	6 ft 4 in (1.93 m)	180 lb (82 kg)	So	Mount Hebron	Ellicott City, Maryland
C	50	David Robinson	6 ft 11 in (2.11 m)	230 lb (104 kg)	Jr	Osbourn Park	Woodbridge, Virginia
F	51	Vernon Butler	6 ft 7 in (2.01 m)	245 lb (111 kg)	Sr	High Point	Beltsville, Maryland

Head coach

- Paul Evans

Assistant coach(es)

- Pete Herrmann
- John Fitzpatrick
- David Laton

Legend

- (C) Team captain
- (S) Suspended
- (I) Ineligible
- (W) Walk-on
- Injured
- Current redshirt

== Schedule and results ==
Date time, TV	Rank^{#}	Opponent^{#}	Result	Record	High points	High rebounds	High assists	Site (attendance) city, state
Non-conference regular season
Nov 22, 1985*	No. 19	vs. St. John's; Big Apple NIT first round	L 58–66	0–1	27 – Robinson	18 – Robinson	–	Hartford Civic Center (5,336); Hartford, CT
Nov 26, 1985*		Westminster (PA)	W 84–54	1–1	24 – Robinson	10 – Robinson	–	Halsey Field House (2,050); Annapolis, MD
Dec 2, 1985*		Case Western Reserve	W 105–55	2–1	21 – Robinson	11 – Liebert	6 – Tied	Halsey Field House (1,075); Annapolis, MD
Dec 4, 1985*		Penn State	W 103–50	3–1	21 – Robinson	17 – Robinson	–	Halsey Field House (4,226); Annapolis, MD
Dec 6, 1985*		vs. Ohio; Carrier Classic	W 73–62	4–1	29 – Butler	16 – Robinson	–	Carrier Dome (23,764); Syracuse, NY
Dec 7, 1985*		at No. 4 Syracuse; Carrier Classic	L 67–89	4–2	22 – Robinson	11 – Robinson	–	Carrier Dome (25,432); Syracuse, NY
Dec 20, 1985*		vs. Air Force; Suntory Ball Tournament	W 70–53	5–2	19 – Robinson	13 – Robinson	–	Osaka Castle Hall (13,185); Osaka, Japan
Dec 22, 1985*		vs. Army; Suntory Ball Tournament	W 93–63	6–2	19 – Robinson	17 – Butler	–	Kokugikan Arena (12,732); Tokyo, Japan
Dec 27, 1985*		vs. No. 20 DePaul; Cotton States Classic	W 67–64	7–2	23 – Butler	16 – Robinson	–	The Omni (14,010); Atlanta, GA
Dec 28, 1985*		at No. 7 Georgia Tech; Cotton States Classic	L 64–82	7–3	22 – Butler	7 – Tied	–	The Omni (15,768); Atlanta, GA
CAA regular season
Jan 4, 1986		at UNC Wilmington	W 76–61	8–3 (1–0)	24 – Butler	14 – Robinson	–	Trask Coliseum (5,530); Wilmington, NC
Jan 6, 1986		at East Carolina	W 67–62	9–3 (2–0)	23 – Robinson	12 – Robinson	–	Williams Arena at Minges Coliseum (3,500); Greenville, NC
Jan 9, 1986		James Madison	W 85–54	10–3 (3–0)	26 – Robinson	18 – Robinson	–	Halsey Field House (3,735); Annapolis, MD
Jan 11, 1986		George Mason	W 88–74	11–3 (4–0)	26 – Whitaker	13 – Robinson	–	Halsey Field House (4,557); Annapolis, MD
Jan 15, 1986*		Lafayette	W 71–56	12–3	21 – Butler	13 – Robinson	–	Halsey Field House (3,131); Annapolis, MD
Jan 18, 1986		at American	W 97–68	13–3 (5–0)	17 – Robinson	13 – Robinson	–	Fort Myer Ceremonial Hall (2,275); Washington, D.C.
Jan 20, 1986*		at Delaware	W 108–63	14–3	37 – Robinson	14 – Robinson	–	Delaware Field House (2,559); Newark, DE
Jan 23, 1986		at Richmond	L 61–67	14–4 (5–1)	22 – Robinson	11 – Robinson	–	Robins Center (9,673); Richmond, VA
Jan 25, 1986		at William & Mary	W 76–68	15–4 (6–1)	31 – Robinson	8 – Robinson	–	Kaplan Arena (4,521); Williamsburg, VA
Feb 1, 1986		UNC Wilmington	W 95–68	16–4 (7–1)	31 – Robinson	12 – Butler	–	Halsey Field House (3,985); Annapolis, MD
Feb 3, 1986		East Carolina	W 71–56	17–4 (8–1)	26 – Butler	10 – Robinson	–	Halsey Field House (2,565); Annapolis, MD
Feb 6, 1986		at George Mason	W 81–68	18–4 (9–1)	33 – Robinson	20 – Robinson	–	Patriot Center (5,222); Fairfax, VA
Feb 8, 1986		at James Madison	W 63–51	19–4 (10–1)	20 – Robinson	7 – Butler	–	JMU Convocation Center (6,100); Harrisonburg, VA
Feb 12, 1986*		at Fairfield	W 78–53	20–4	19 – Robinson	25 – Robinson	–	Brendan Byrne Arena (5,118); East Rutherford, NJ
Feb 15, 1986		American	W 74–53	21–4 (11–1)	16 – Robinson	13 – Robinson	–	Halsey Field House (4,135); Annapolis, MD
Feb 17, 1986	No. 17	William & Mary	W 66–51	22–4 (12–1)	19 – Robinson	14 – Robinson	–	Halsey Field House (3,185); Annapolis, MD
Feb 22, 1986*	No. 17	at Army	W 55–52 ^{OT}	23–4	23 – Robinson	11 – Robinson	–	Christl Arena (3,517); West Point, NY
Feb 25, 1986	No. 19	Richmond	W 85–72	24–4 (13–1)	27 – Butler	11 – Robinson	–	Halsey Field House (6,315); Annapolis, MD
CAA tournament
Mar 1, 1986*	(1) No. 18	(8) James Madison; Quarterfinals	W 81–67	25–4	32 – Robinson	19 – Robinson	–	Halsey Field House (2,033); Annapolis, MD
Mar 3, 1986*	(1) No. 18	vs. (4) UNC Wilmington; Semifinals	W 62–60	26–4	22 – Robinson	16 – Robinson	–	Patriot Center (4,439); Fairfax, VA
Mar 4, 1986*	(1) No. 18	at (3) George Mason; CAA tournament championship	W 72–61	27–4	26 – Robinson	12 – Robinson	–	Patriot Center (6,218); Fairfax, VA
NCAA tournament
Mar 14, 1986*	(7 E) No. 17	vs. (10 E) Tulsa; First round	W 87–68	28–4	30 – Robinson	12 – Robinson	11 – Whitaker	Carrier Dome (19,004); Syracuse, NY
Mar 16, 1986*	(7 E) No. 17	at (2 E) No. 9 Syracuse; Second Round	W 97–85	29–4	35 – Robinson	11 – Robinson	7 – Whitaker	Carrier Dome (21,713); Syracuse, NY
Mar 21, 1986*	(7 E) No. 17	at (14 E) Cleveland State; Regional semifinal	W 71–70	30–4	23 – Whitaker	14 – Robinson	10 – Whitaker	Brendan Byrne Arena (19,454); East Rutherford, NJ
Mar 23, 1986*	(7 E) No. 17	at (1 E) No. 1 Duke; Regional final	L 50–71	30–5	23 – Robinson	10 – Robinson	7 – Whitaker	Brendan Byrne Arena (19,454); East Rutherford, NJ
*Non-conference game. ^{#}Rankings from AP Poll. (#) Tournament seedings in parentheses. E=East. All times are in Eastern Time.

== Awards and honors ==
- David Robinson – CAA Player of the Year (2), Consensus Second-Team All-American, NCAA records for blocked shots in a game (14) and season (207), National leader in rebounds (13.0) and blocked shots (5.9) per game
