= 2002–03 UNC Wilmington Seahawks men's basketball team =

American college basketball season

2002–03 UNC Wilmington Seahawks men's basketball

CAA regular season and tournament champions

NCAA tournament, first round
- Conference: Colonial Athletic Association
- Record: 24–7 (15–3 CAA)
- Head coach: Brad Brownell (1st season)
- Assistant coach: Billy Donlon
- Home arena: Trask Coliseum

2002–03 CAA men's basketball standings
	Conf.				Overall
Team	W		L	PCT	W		L	PCT
UNC Wilmington †	15	–	3	.833	24	–	7	.774
VCU	12	–	6	.667	18	–	10	.643
Drexel	12	–	6	.667	19	–	12	.613
George Mason	11	–	7	.611	16	–	12	.571
Delaware	9	–	9	.500	15	–	14	.517
Old Dominion	9	–	9	.500	12	–	15	.444
James Madison	8	–	10	.444	13	–	17	.433
William & Mary	7	–	11	.389	12	–	16	.429
Hofstra	6	–	12	.333	8	–	21	.276
Towson	1	–	17	.056	4	–	24	.143
† 2003 CAA tournament winner Rankings from AP poll

The 2002–03 UNC Wilmington Seahawks men's basketball team represented the University of North Carolina Wilmington during the 2002–03 NCAA Division I men's basketball season. The Seahawks, led by first-year head coach Brad Brownell, played their home games at the Trask Coliseum and were members of the Colonial Athletic Association (CAA).

After finishing atop the CAA regular season standings, the Seahawks won the CAA tournament to receive an automatic bid to the NCAA tournament as No. 11 seed in the South region. After leading No. 6 seed Maryland late in the game, the Seahawks' hearts were broken when Drew Nicholas hit a buzzer-beater for Maryland.

Senior shooting guard Brett Blizzard repeated as CAA Player of the Year and an AP Honorable Mention All-American.

== Roster ==
2002–03 UNC Wilmington Seahawks men's basketball team
Players
Coaches

Pos.	#	Name	Height	Weight	Year	Hometown
G	3	John Goldsberry	6 ft 3 in (1.91 m)	185 lb (84 kg)	Fr	Vandalia, Ohio
G	11	Brett Blizzard	6 ft 4 in (1.93 m)	195 lb (88 kg)	Sr	Tallahassee, Florida

Head coach

- Brad Brownell

Assistant coach(es)

- Billy Donlon

Legend

- (C) Team captain
- (S) Suspended
- (I) Ineligible
- (W) Walk-on
- Injured
- Current redshirt

Roster

== Schedule and results ==
Date time, TV	Rank^{#}	Opponent^{#}	Result	Record	Site (attendance) city, state
Regular season
Nov 22, 2002*		at Texas Tech	L 76–85	0–1	United Spirit Arena; Lubbock, Texas
Nov 30, 2002*		East Tennessee State	W 78–57	2–1	Trask Coliseum; Wilmington, North Carolina
Dec 7, 2002*		at Dayton	L 48–59	2–3	University of Dayton Arena; Dayton, Ohio
CAA tournament
Mar 8, 2003*		vs. Hofstra; Quarterfinals	W 76–56	22–6	Richmond Coliseum; Richmond, Virginia
Mar 9, 2003*		vs. Delaware; Semifinals	W 63–50	23–6	Richmond Coliseum; Richmond, Virginia
Mar 10, 2003*		vs. Drexel; Championship game	W 70–62	24–6	Richmond Coliseum; Richmond, Virginia
NCAA tournament
Mar 21, 2003*	(11 S)	vs. (6 S) No. 17 Maryland; First round	L 73–75	24–7	Bridgestone Arena; Nashville, Tennessee
*Non-conference game. ^{#}Rankings from AP poll. (#) Tournament seedings in parentheses. S=South. All times are in Eastern Time.

== Awards and honors ==
- Brett Blizzard – AP Honorable Mention All-American, CAA Player of the Year, CAA tournament MVP
