= 1983–84 Navy Midshipmen men's basketball team =

American college basketball season

1983–84 Navy Midshipmen men's basketball
- Conference: Colonial Athletic Association
- Record: 24-8 (6-4 ECAC South)
- Head coach: Paul Evans (4th season)
- Assistant coach: Pete Herrmann

1983–84 ECAC South men's basketball standings
	Conf.				Overall
Team	W		L	PCT	W		L	PCT
Richmond †	7	–	3	.700	22	–	10	.688
Navy	6	–	4	.600	24	–	8	.750
William & Mary	6	–	4	.600	14	–	14	.500
George Mason	5	–	5	.500	21	–	7	.750
James Madison	5	–	5	.500	15	–	14	.517
East Carolina	1	–	9	.100	4	–	24	.143
† 1984 ECAC South tournament winner Rankings from AP Poll

The 1983–84 Navy Midshipmen men's basketball team represented the United States Naval Academy during the 1983–84 NCAA Division I men's basketball season. The Midshipmen were led by fourth-year head coach Paul Evans, and played their home games at Halsey Field House in Annapolis, Maryland as members of the ECAC South.

== Roster ==
1983–84 Navy Midshipmen men's basketball team
Players
Coaches

Pos.	#	Name	Height	Weight	Year	Previous school	Hometown
G	5	Kylor Whitaker	6 ft 6 in (1.98 m)	—	So		Lebanon, Oregon
G	10	Doug Wojcik	6 ft 2 in (1.88 m)	—	Fr	Wheeling Central Catholic	Wheeling, West Virginia
F	40	Carl Liebert	6 ft 6 in (1.98 m)	205 lb (93 kg)	Fr		Floyds Knobs, Indiana
C	50	David Robinson	6 ft 9 in (2.06 m)	215 lb (98 kg)	Fr	Osbourn Park	Woodbridge, Virginia
F	51	Vernon Butler	6 ft 7 in (2.01 m)	—	So		Beltsville, Maryland

Head coach

- Paul Evans

Assistant coach(es)

- Pete Herrmann
- John Fitzpatrick
- David Laton

Legend

- (C) Team captain
- (S) Suspended
- (I) Ineligible
- (W) Walk-on
- Injured
- Current redshirt

== Schedule and results ==
Date time, TV	Rank^{#}	Opponent^{#}	Result	Record	Site (attendance) city, state
Non-conference regular season
ECAC South regular season
ECAC South tournament
Mar 10, 1984*		vs. Richmond; ECAC South Championship	L 55–74	24-8	JMU Convocation Center; Harrisonburg, VA
*Non-conference game. ^{#}Rankings from AP Poll. (#) Tournament seedings in parentheses. All times are in Eastern Time.
