= 1995 CAA men's basketball tournament =

- Classification: Division I
- Season: 1994–95
- Teams: 8
- Site: Richmond Coliseum; Richmond, Virginia
- Champions: Old Dominion (4th title)
- Winning coach: Jeff Capel II (1st title)
- MVP: Petey Sessoms (Old Dominion)
- Television: ESPN

1994–95 CAA men's basketball standings
	Conf.				Overall
Team	W		L	PCT	W		L	PCT
Old Dominion †	12	–	2	.857	21	–	12	.636
UNC Wilmington	10	–	4	.714	16	–	11	.593
James Madison	9	–	5	.643	16	–	13	.552
East Carolina	7	–	7	.500	18	–	11	.621
American	7	–	7	.500	9	–	19	.321
William & Mary	6	–	8	.429	8	–	19	.296
Richmond	3	–	11	.214	8	–	20	.286
George Mason	2	–	12	.143	7	–	20	.259
† 1995 CAA tournament winner Rankings from AP poll

The 1995 CAA men's basketball tournament was held March 4–6, 1995, at the Richmond Coliseum in Richmond, Virginia. The winner of the tournament was Old Dominion, who received an automatic bid to the 1995 NCAA Men's Division I Basketball Tournament.

== Bracket ==
Quarterfinals, March 4
1	Old Dominion	110
8	George Mason	94
4	East Carolina	67
5	American	75
2	UNC-Wilmington	54
7	Richmond	60
3	James Madison	73
6	William & Mary	56

Semifinals, March 5
1	Old Dominion	77
5	American	67
7	Richmond	70
3	James Madison	81

Final, March 6
1	Old Dominion	80
3	James Madison	75

== Honors ==
CAA All-Tournament Team	Player	School
CAA All-Tournament Team	Petey Sessoms	Old Dominion
CAA All-Tournament Team	Christian Ast	American
CAA All-Tournament Team	Mike Jones	Old Dominion
CAA All-Tournament Team	Darren McLinton	James Madison
CAA All-Tournament Team	Mario Mullen	Old Dominion
CAA All-Tournament Team	Louis Rowe	James Madison
