= 1985–86 Richmond Spiders men's basketball team =

American college basketball season

1985–86 Richmond Spiders men's basketball

NCAA tournament
- Conference: Colonial Athletic Association
- Record: 23–7 (12–2 CAA)
- Head coach: Dick Tarrant (5th season)
- Home arena: Robins Center

1985–86 CAA men's basketball standings
| | Conf. | | | | Overall |
| Team | W | | L | PCT | W | | L | PCT |
|---|---|---|---|---|---|---|---|---|
| No. 17 Navy † | 13 | – | 1 | .929 | 30 | – | 5 | .857 |
| Richmond | 12 | – | 2 | .857 | 23 | – | 7 | .767 |
| George Mason | 10 | – | 4 | .714 | 20 | – | 12 | .625 |
| UNC Wilmington | 6 | – | 8 | .429 | 16 | – | 13 | .552 |
| East Carolina | 6 | – | 8 | .429 | 12 | – | 16 | .429 |
| American | 3 | – | 11 | .214 | 10 | – | 18 | .357 |
| William & Mary | 3 | – | 11 | .214 | 8 | – | 20 | .286 |
| James Madison | 3 | – | 11 | .214 | 5 | – | 23 | .179 |
† 1986 CAA tournament winner Rankings from AP Poll

The 1985–86 Richmond Spiders men's basketball team represented the University of Richmond in National Collegiate Athletic Association (NCAA) Division I college basketball during the 1985–86 season. Richmond competed as a member of the Colonial Athletic Association (CAA; formerly known as the ECAC South Conference) under head basketball coach Dick Tarrant and played its home games at the Robins Center.

Richmond finished second behind Navy in the CAA regular-season standings with a 12–2 conference record, and lost in the semifinal round of the CAA tournament. The Spiders received an at-large bid to the 1986 NCAA tournament. As No. 11 seed in the East region, Richmond lost to No. 6 seed Saint Joseph's, 60–59, in the opening round.

== Roster ==
1985–86 Richmond Spiders men's basketball team
| Players | Coaches |
|---|---|
| Pos. / # / Name / Height / Weight / Year / Previous school / Hometown; G / 20 / Johnny Newman / 6 ft 7 in (2.01 m) / 180 lb (82 kg) / Sr / George Washington HS / Danville, Virginia | Head coach: Dick Tarrant; Assistant coach(es) Legend: (C) Team captain; (S) Suspended; (I) Ineligible; (W) Walk-on; Injured; Current redshirt |

Kenny Atkinson

== Schedule and results ==
| Date time, TV | Rank^{#} | Opponent^{#} | Result | Record | Site city, state |
Regular season
| Nov 26, 1985* | | at Providence | W 70–64 | 1–0 | Providence Civic Center; Providence, Rhode Island |
| Nov 30, 1985* | | Wake Forest | W 66–43 | 2–0 | Robins Center; Richmond, Virginia |
| Dec 3, 1985* | | at VCU | W 64–59 | 3–0 | Richmond Coliseum; Richmond, Virginia |
| Dec 6, 1985* | | vs. Saint Mary's; Apple Invitational | W 75–63 | 4–0 | Palo Alto, California |
| Dec 7, 1985* | | vs. Stanford; Apple Invitational | W 57–53 | 5–0 | Palo Alto, California |
| Dec 10, 1985* | | VMI | W 69–61 | 6–0 | Robins Center; Richmond, Virginia |
| Dec 20, 1985* | | at VCU; Times-Dispatch Tournament | W 67–65 ^{OT} | 7–0 | Richmond Coliseum; Richmond, Virginia |
| Dec 21, 1985* | | vs. Virginia; Times-Dispatch Tournament | W 58–46 | 8–0 | Richmond Coliseum; Richmond, Virginia |
| Dec 30, 1985* | | at No. 6 Georgia Tech | L 64–90 | 8–1 | Alexander Memorial Coliseum; Atlanta, Georgia |
| Jan 4, 1986 | | William & Mary | W 52–36 | 9–1 (1–0) | Robins Center; Richmond, Virginia |
| Jan 11, 1986 | | East Carolina | W 60–52 | 10–1 (2–0) | Robins Center; Richmond, Virginia |
| Jan 13, 1986 | | UNC Wilmington | W 79–63 | 11–1 (3–0) | Robins Center; Richmond, Virginia |
| Jan 15, 1986* | | Radford | W 74–52 | 12–1 | Robins Center; Richmond, Virginia |
| Jan 18, 1986 | | at George Mason | W 62–59 | 13–1 (4–0) | Patriot Center; Fairfax, Virginia |
| Jan 20, 1986 | | at James Madison | W 61–44 | 14–1 (5–0) | Convocation Center; Harrisonburg, Virginia |
| Jan 23, 1986 | | Navy | W 67–61 | 15–1 (6–0) | Robins Center; Richmond, Virginia |
| Jan 25, 1986 | | American | W 74–59 | 16–1 (7–0) | Robins Center; Richmond, Virginia |
| Jan 27, 1986* | | Old Dominion | L 59–62 | 16–2 | Robins Center; Richmond, Virginia |
| Jan 30, 1986* | No. 20 | at No. 16 Virginia Tech | L 67–71 | 16–3 | Cassell Coliseum; Blacksburg, Virginia |
| Feb 1, 1986 | | at William & Mary | W 67–47 | 17–3 (8–0) | Kaplan Arena; Williamsburg, Virginia |
| Feb 8, 1986 | | at East Carolina | W 71–52 | 18–3 (9–0) | Williams Arena at Minges Coliseum; Greenville, North Carolina |
| Feb 10, 1986 | | at UNC Wilmington | W 70–59 | 19–3 (10–0) | Trask Coliseum; Wilmington, North Carolina |
| Feb 13, 1986 | | James Madison | W 68–62 | 20–3 (11–0) | Robins Center; Richmond, Virginia |
| Feb 15, 1986 | | George Mason | L 58–73 | 20–4 (11–1) | Robins Center; Richmond, Virginia |
| Feb 20, 1986* | | Loyola (MD) | W 76–62 | 21–4 | Robins Center; Richmond, Virginia |
| Feb 22, 1986 | | at American | W 76–68 | 22–4 (12–1) | Fort Myer Ceremonial Hall; Washington, D.C. |
| Feb 25, 1986 | | at No. 19 Navy | L 72–85 | 22–5 (12–2) | Halsey Field House; Annapolis, Maryland |
CAA Tournament
| Mar 1, 1986* | (2) | (7) William & Mary; Quarterfinals | W 61–50 | 23–5 | Robins Center; Richmond, Virginia |
| Mar 2, 1986* | (2) | at (3) George Mason; Semifinals | L 60–62 | 23–6 | Patriot Center; Fairfax, Virginia |
NCAA Tournament
| Mar 14, 1986* | (11 E) | vs. (6 E) Saint Joseph's; First Round | L 59–60 | 23–7 | Carrier Dome; Syracuse, New York |
*Non-conference game. ^{#}Rankings from AP poll. (#) Tournament seedings in parentheses. E=East. All times are in Eastern.

== 1986 NBA draft ==
| Round | Pick | Player | NBA Team |
|---|---|---|---|
| 2 | 29 | Johnny Newman | Cleveland Cavaliers |
