= 2003 CAA men's basketball tournament =

- Classification: Division I
- Season: 2002–03
- Teams: 10
- Site: Richmond Coliseum; Richmond, Virginia
- Champions: UNC Wilmington (3rd title)
- Winning coach: Brad Brownell (1st title)
- MVP: Brett Blizzard (UNC Wilmington)
- Television: ESPN

2002–03 CAA men's basketball standings
| | Conf. | | | | Overall |
| Team | W | | L | PCT | W | | L | PCT |
|---|---|---|---|---|---|---|---|---|
| UNC Wilmington † | 15 | – | 3 | .833 | 24 | – | 7 | .774 |
| VCU | 12 | – | 6 | .667 | 18 | – | 10 | .643 |
| Drexel | 12 | – | 6 | .667 | 19 | – | 12 | .613 |
| George Mason | 11 | – | 7 | .611 | 16 | – | 12 | .571 |
| Delaware | 9 | – | 9 | .500 | 15 | – | 14 | .517 |
| Old Dominion | 9 | – | 9 | .500 | 12 | – | 15 | .444 |
| James Madison | 8 | – | 10 | .444 | 13 | – | 17 | .433 |
| William & Mary | 7 | – | 11 | .389 | 12 | – | 16 | .429 |
| Hofstra | 6 | – | 12 | .333 | 8 | – | 21 | .276 |
| Towson | 1 | – | 17 | .056 | 4 | – | 24 | .143 |
† 2003 CAA tournament winner Rankings from AP poll

The 2003 CAA men's basketball tournament was held from March 7–10, 2003 at the Richmond Coliseum in Richmond, Virginia. The winner of the tournament was UNC Wilmington, who received an automatic bid to the 2003 NCAA Men's Division I Basketball Tournament.

== Bracket ==
First round Friday, March 7
8 | William & Mary | 64
9 | Hofstra | 74
7 | James Madison | 72
10 | Towson | 61

Quarterfinals; Saturday, March 8
1 | UNC Wilmington | 76
9 | Hofstra | 56
4 | George Mason | 49
5 | Delaware | 61
2 | VCU | 73
7 | James Madison | 53
3 | Drexel | 61
6 | Old Dominion | 52

Semifinals; Sunday, March 9
1 | UNC Wilmington | 63
5 | Delaware | 50
2 | VCU | 60
3 | Drexel | 62

Final; Monday, March 10
1 | UNC Wilmington | 70
3 | Drexel | 62

== Honors ==
| CAA All-Tournament Team | Player | School | Position |
|---|---|---|---|
| CAA All-Tournament Team | Brett Blizzard | UNC-Wilmington | Guard |
| CAA All-Tournament Team | Robert Battle | Drexel | Forward |
| CAA All-Tournament Team | Tim Burnette | UNC-Wilmington | Guard |
| CAA All-Tournament Team | Craig Callahan | UNC-Wilmington | Forward |
| CAA All-Tournament Team | Kenell Sanchez | Drexel | Guard |
| CAA All-Tournament Team | Willie Taylor | VCU | Forward |
