= 1984–85 Navy Midshipmen men's basketball team =

American college basketball season

1984–85 Navy Midshipmen men's basketball

ECAC South tournament champions ECAC South Regular Season co-champions

NCAA men's Division I tournament, Second Round
- Conference: Colonial Athletic Association
- Record: 26–6 (11–3 ECAC South)
- Head coach: Paul Evans (5th season)
- Assistant coach: Pete Herrmann

1984–85 ECAC South men's basketball standings
	Conf.				Overall
Team	W		L	PCT	W		L	PCT
Navy †	11	–	3	.786	26	–	6	.813
Richmond	11	–	3	.786	21	–	11	.656
George Mason	10	–	4	.714	18	–	11	.621
William & Mary	9	–	5	.643	16	–	12	.571
James Madison	7	–	7	.500	14	–	14	.500
UNC Wilmington	4	–	10	.286	12	–	16	.429
American	3	–	11	.214	9	–	19	.321
East Carolina	1	–	13	.071	7	–	21	.250
† 1985 ECAC South tournament winner Rankings from AP Poll

The 1984–85 Navy Midshipmen men's basketball team represented the United States Naval Academy during the 1984–85 NCAA Division I men's basketball season. The Midshipmen were led by fifth-year head coach Paul Evans, and played their home games at Halsey Field House in Annapolis, Maryland as members of the Colonial Athletic Association.

== Roster ==
1984–85 Navy Midshipmen men's basketball team
Players
Coaches

Pos.	#	Name	Height	Weight	Year	Previous school	Hometown
G	5	Kylor Whitaker	6 ft 6 in (1.98 m)	—	Jr		Lebanon, Oregon
G	10	Doug Wojcik	6 ft 2 in (1.88 m)	—	So	Wheeling Central Catholic	Wheeling, West Virginia
F	40	Carl Liebert	6 ft 6 in (1.98 m)	205 lb (93 kg)	So		Floyds Knobs, Indiana
C	50	David Robinson	6 ft 11 in (2.11 m)	225 lb (102 kg)	So	Osbourn Park	Woodbridge, Virginia
F	51	Vernon Butler	6 ft 7 in (2.01 m)	—	Jr		Beltsville, Maryland

Head coach

- Paul Evans

Assistant coach(es)

- Pete Herrmann
- John Fitzpatrick
- David Laton

Legend

- (C) Team captain
- (S) Suspended
- (I) Ineligible
- (W) Walk-on
- Injured
- Current redshirt

== Schedule and results ==
Date time, TV	Rank^{#}	Opponent^{#}	Result	Record	Site (attendance) city, state
Non-conference regular season
ECAC South regular season
Jan 24, 1985		at UNC Wilmington	W 78–51	14–2 (6–0)	Trask Coliseum; Wilmington, NC
Feb 4, 1985*		at Fairleigh Dickinson	W 83–74	17–3	FDU Gym; Hackensack, New Jersey
Feb 27, 1985		at George Mason	L 77–93	21–5 (11–3)	GMU Field House; Fairfax, VA
Mar 4, 1985*		at Campbell	W 84–63	22–5	Carter Gymnasium; Buies Creek, NC
ECAC South tournament
Mar 7, 1985*	(1)	vs. (8) East Carolina; Quarterfinals	W 94–73	23–5	Kaplan Arena; Williamsburg, VA
Mar 8, 1985*	(1)	at (4) William & Mary; Semifinals	W 89–83	24–5	Kaplan Arena; Williamsburg, VA
Mar 9, 1985*	(1)	vs. (2) Richmond; Championship	W 85–76	25–5	Kaplan Arena; Williamsburg, VA
NCAA tournament
3/15/1985*	(13 SE)	vs. (4 SE) No. 20 LSU; First Round	W 78–55	26–5	University of Dayton Arena; Dayton, OH
3/17/1985*	(13 SE)	at (5 SE) Maryland; Second Round	L 59–64	26–6	University of Dayton Arena; Dayton, OH
*Non-conference game. ^{#}Rankings from AP Poll. (#) Tournament seedings in parentheses. SE=Southeast. All times are in Eastern Time.

== Awards and honors ==
- David Robinson, ECAC South Player of the Year
- Vernon Butler, ECAC South tournament MVP
