= Odell Hodge =

American basketball player

Personal information
- Born: March 26, 1973 (age 53)
- Listed height: 6 ft 9 in (2.06 m)
- Listed weight: 255 lb (116 kg)

Career information
- High school: Laurel Park (Martinsville, Virginia)
- College: Old Dominion (1992–1997)
- NBA draft: 1997: undrafted
- Playing career: 1997–2013
- Position: Power forward / center
- Number: 15, 33

Career history

Playing
- 1997–1998: Fenerbahçe Istanbul
- 1999–2000: Royal Go Pass Pepinster
- 2000–2001: Telindus Mons Hainaut
- 2005–2011: Euphony Bree
- 2011–2013: Houthalen

Coaching
- 2013–2017: Hasselt BT

Career highlights
- Honorable mention All-American – AP (1997); 2× CAA Player of the Year (1994, 1997); 3× First-team All-CAA (1994, 1996, 1997); Second-team All-CAA (1993); CAA All-Defensive Team (1997); 2× CAA tournament MVP (1994, 1997); CAA Rookie of the Year (1993); CAA All-Rookie Team (1993); No. 33 retired by Old Dominion Monarchs

Odell Hodge (born March 26, 1973) is an American former basketball player for Old Dominion University and, later, professional teams in Belgium.

== High school ==
Hodge was most known for his potent scoring ability since his high school days at Laurel Park High School in Martinsville, Virginia. He is in the state of Virginia's Top 25 single season scoring leaders of all-time because of his 786-point season during 1991–92. He is currently second all-time in Virginia high school career points (2,530). At the time of his graduation, he was 1st alltime.

== Old Dominion University ==
Odell Hodge established himself as one of the greatest men's basketball players in Old Dominion University history. He began his career by earning the Colonial Athletic Association (CAA) Rookie of the Year in 1993. While playing for the Monarchs, Hodge compiled over 2,000 points and 1,000 rebounds. His 2,117 points and 1,086 rebounds make him only one of four Division I men's basketball players in Virginia history to reach the 2000/1000 club (the others are Ralph Sampson, Kenny Sanders, and Jeff Cohen). In 1994 and 1997, Hodge's sophomore and redshirt senior seasons, he was named both the CAA Player of the Year and CAA Tournament MVP. He was named to the CAA's All-Defensive squad in 1997 and ranks in the CAA's top ten all-time in scoring, second to David Robinson in career blocked shots (286), and in the top five of all-time CAA rebounding. Hodge graduated in 1997 and received his degree in recreation and leisure studies. Because of Hodge's success as a basketball player at Old Dominion University, his #33 jersey was retired up in the banners of the TED Constant Convocation Center on February 12, 2010 and he was inducted into the school's athletic hall of fame.

Hodge returned to Old Dominion to become a special assistant to head coach Mike Jones in March 2024. The two played together for the Monarchs for three seasons.

== Belgian First Division ==
Hodge did not go on to play in the National Basketball Association (NBA) despite his collegiate success. He instead moved to Brussels to compete in the Belgian First Division level of professional basketball. Between 1999 and 2008, Hodge played for three different Belgian teams. His best statistical season occurred in 1999–2000 while playing for Royal Go Pass Pepinster. He averaged 15.3 points and 8.2 rebounds per game in 23 games played. Odell Hodge also competed in the 2000–2001 Korac Cup as a member of the Telindus Mons Hainaut for four games totaling 12 points. Though he did have moderate success throughout the other years, Hodge was never named to any all-star teams. Hodge stills lives in Belgium where he still resides with his wife, Sofie Ceyssens, and his two children Matthew and Jayden.

== See also ==
- List of NCAA Division I men's basketball players with 2000 points and 1000 rebounds
