= 1994 CAA men's basketball tournament =

- Classification: Division I
- Season: 1993–94
- Teams: 8
- Site: Richmond Coliseum; Richmond, Virginia
- Champions: James Madison (3rd title)
- Winning coach: Lefty Driesell (1st title)
- MVP: Odell Hodge (Old Dominion)
- Television: HTS

The 1994 CAA men's basketball tournament was held March 5–7, 1994, at the Richmond Coliseum in Richmond, Virginia. The winner of the tournament was James Madison, who received an automatic bid to the 1994 NCAA Men's Division I Basketball Tournament.

== Seeds ==
Seed	School	Conf.	Tiebreaker
1	Old Dominion	10–4	
2	James Madison	10–4	
3	UNC Wilmington	9–5	
4	Richmond	8–6	
5	East Carolina	7–7	
6	George Mason	5–9	
7	American	5–9	
8	William & Mary	2–12	

== Schedule ==
Session	Game	Time*	Matchup	Score	Television
Quarterfinals – Saturday, March 5
1	1	12 Noon	No. 1 Old Dominion vs. No. 8 William & Mary	83–58	HTS
1	2	2:30 pm	No. 4 Richmond vs. No. 5 East Carolina	58–55	HTS
2	3	7:00 pm	No. 2 James Madison vs. No. 7 American	86–67	HTS
2	4	9:30 pm	No. 3 UNC Wilmington vs. No. 6 George Mason	100–97^{(OT)}	HTS
Semifinals – Sunday, March 6
3	5	3:00 pm	No. 1 Old Dominion vs. No. 4 Richmond	76–62	HTS
3	6	5:30 pm	No. 2 James Madison vs. No. 3 UNC Wilmington	91–78	HTS
Championship – Monday, March 7
4	7	8:00 pm	No. 1 Old Dominion vs. No. 2 James Madison	76–77	HTS
*Game times in EST for all rounds. Rankings denote tournament seed.

== Bracket ==
Quarterfinals; March 5 HTS
1	Old Dominion	83
8	William & Mary	58
4	Richmond	58
5	East Carolina	55
2	James Madison	86
7	American	67
3	UNC Wilmington	100*
6	George Mason	97

Semifinals; March 6 HTS
1	Old Dominion	76
4	Richmond	72
2	James Madison	91
3	UNC Wilmington	78

Final; March 7 HTS
1	Old Dominion	76
2	James Madison	77

== Honors ==
CAA All-Tournament Team	Player	School
CAA All-Tournament Team	Odell Hodge	Old Dominion
CAA All-Tournament Team	Michael Hodges	Richmond
CAA All-Tournament Team	Mike Jones	Old Dominion
CAA All-Tournament Team	Darren Moore	UNC Wilmington
CAA All-Tournament Team	Clayton Ritter	James Madison
CAA All-Tournament Team	Kevin Swann	Old Dominion
