= John Barker Carpenter =

American college athletics coach and administrator (1930–2017)

John Barker Carpenter (October 30, 1930 – April 14, 2017) was an American college athletics coach and administrator.

== Education and early career ==
He attended Penn State and graduated in 1960 with a master's degree in education. Carpenter served on the staff and faculty at Gettysburg College from 1958 to 1966 as a teacher, coach and director of intramurals. In 1964 he founded Camp Gettysburg Basketball Camp on a hillside overlooking the Gettysburg battlefield, along with financial support from Harvey Warner - the owner of the Peacelight Inn - and with assistance from Bill Gibson - the head basketball coach at the University of Virginia.

== Rider University ==
He was athletic director and coached 23 seasons at Rider University from 1966 to 1989. He is Rider's all-time winning-est coach with a record of 292 wins and took one team (1983–84) to the NCAA Tournament.

As the athletic director, Carpenter brought Rider into NCAA Division I athletics in the 1967–68 season as a member of the Middle Atlantic Conference. He was the driving force behind an athletic department that grew from five to 16 sports. He was one of the 12 founders of the East Coast Conference as the group pulled away from the MAC in 1974. Regular opponents included three of the Philadelphia Big Five schools: Saint Josephs, La Salle, and Temple.

Fifteen years after helping to form the East Coast Conference (and after stepping down at Rider), Carpenter became the conference's first full-time commissioner when he took that office on July 1, 1989.

== Distinctions/testimonials ==
In addition to his roles as coach, athletic director and commissioner, Carpenter has been active in other organizations within the college athletic and basketball communities. He served on the Executive Council and Finance Committee of the Eastern College Athletic Conference (ECAC). He was President of the Eastern College Basketball Association (ECBA) from 1978 to 1981, and a member of the NCAA Rules Committee from 1970 to 1977, twice serving as chair. In 1977, while John was serving as chair, the dunk was made legal again.

Carpenter served as a coach for the USA Basketball team that traveled to Argentina for the International Cup Games in 1979 and also served as a coach at the first-ever U.S. Olympic Festival where he earned a silver medal

In an interview, Texas A&M athletic director Dr. Len Nardone said, "A wonderful group of people there. The AD who hired me at the time (John Carpenter) gave me a terrific foundation experience in collegiate sports that I have always appreciated."

Tom Davis, long time Lafayette and Iowa coach, in an interview with the Lehigh Valley Express, said, "There's some great memories there. That first team (1971–72) was special. It was my first year as a head coach. We went to the NIT and that's when you had only 16 teams in the NIT and 32 in the NCAAs. That (first) year, we beat Virginia in Madison Square Garden in the first round and that kicked things off for us. We had some great recruiting in Easton and the Lehigh Valley and the surrounding areas. And we had some great coaches then, too, Jim Valvano at Bucknell, John Barker Carpenter at Rider, the Lehigh coaches."
