= Brett Blizzard =

American-Italian basketball player

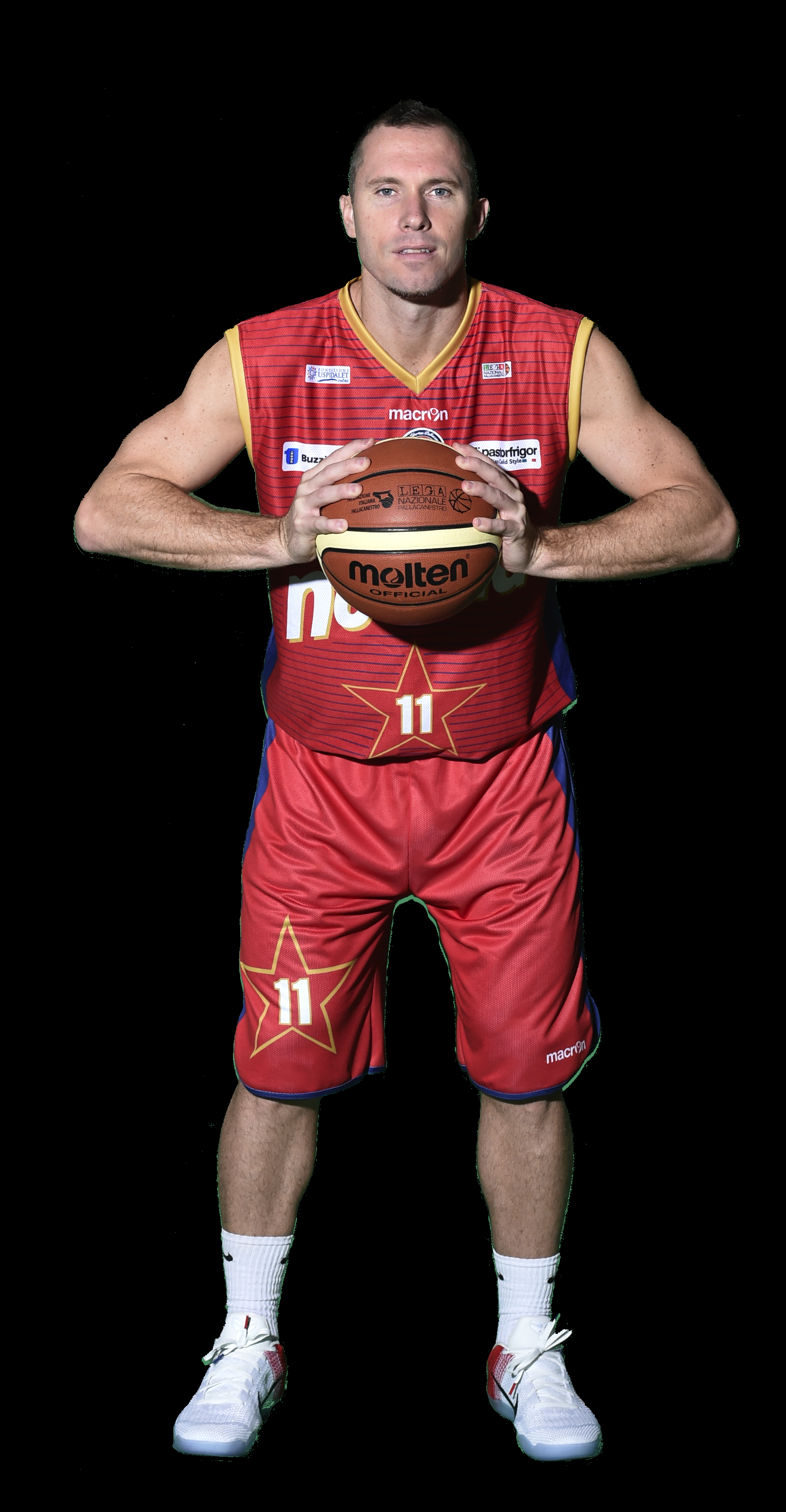
- Blizzard in 2017

Personal information
- Born: June 12, 1980 (age 46) Tallahassee, Florida, U.S.
- Listed height: 6 ft 3 in (1.91 m)
- Listed weight: 200 lb (91 kg)

Career information
- High school: Florida State University School (Tallahassee, Florida)
- College: UNC Wilmington (1999–2003)
- NBA draft: 2003: undrafted
- Playing career: 2003–2019
- Position: Shooting guard

Career history
- 2003–2004: Aurora Basket Jesi
- 2004–2005: Pallacanestro Cantù
- 2005–2006: Pallacanestro Reggiana
- 2006–2010: Virtus Bologna
- 2011–2012: Biancoblù Bologna
- 2012–2013: Wilmington Sea Dawgs
- 2013–2014: Prima Veroli
- 2014–2018: A.S. Junior Pallacanestro Casale
- 2018–2019: Derthona Basket

Career highlights
- 2× AP Honorable mention All-American (2002, 2003); 2× CAA Player of the Year (2002, 2003); 4× First-team All-CAA (2000–2003); 2× CAA All-Defensive Team (2002, 2003); CAA Rookie of the Year (2000); 3× CAA tournament MVP (2000, 2002, 2003)

Brett Alan Blizzard (born June 12, 1980) is an American-Italian basketball player. Originally of American nationality, Blizzard opted to acquire dual citizenship in Italy while playing overseas. He became eligible to play on Italy's national team because of a distant Italian relative. Including Virtus Bologna, Blizzard has played for seven professional teams in his career. He also owns and operates The American Basketball Experience, which brings European youth basketball players to America to train and experience American culture.

== Early life ==
Brett Blizzard was born in Tallahassee, Florida. He attended Florida State University School (colloquially "Florida High School") from 1995 to 1999. As a standout on the basketball team, Brett earned a full-ride scholarship to attend the University of North Carolina Wilmington (UNCW) to play for the UNCW Seahawks in the Colonial Athletic Association (CAA). Blizzard finished his career at Florida High as All-Time leading scorer.

== UNC Wilmington (1999–2003) ==
Brett Blizzard entered UNCW in August 1999 as a relative unknown in college basketball, but by his graduation he had become a national media darling for his performances in the NCAA Men's Division I Basketball Championships.

=== Freshman season ===
Blizzard started all 31 games as a true freshman in 1999–2000. In fact, he would go on to start every single game of his collegiate career. During his first season, Brett led the team in scoring by sinking 483 points (15.6 ppg). He made 94 three-pointers out of 201 attempts, which earned him the Ed Steitz Award by the Basketball Hall of Fame as the top three-point shooting freshman in the nation. Brett complemented his scoring ability with 76 assists and 62 steals. The Seahawks finished the regular season in fourth place with an 8–8 conference record, but Blizzard solidified his selection as an All-CAA First Team selection by leading UNCW to win the CAA Tournament championship. They defeated Richmond 57–47, with Brett taking home his first of an unprecedented three Tournament MVP awards. In the first round of the 2000 NCAA Men's Division I Basketball Tournament, the #15-seeded Seahawks faced #2 Cincinnati, but lost 47–64 in their first ever tournament berth. Blizzard also won the CAA Rookie of the Year award.

=== Sophomore season ===
Brett's sophomore campaign (2000–01) was the least personally successful year of his tenure. In 30 games, Blizzard scored fewer points (415), had fewer steals (48) and made fewer three-pointers than the previous season. Despite the production dropoff, the Seahawks finished the regular season with an 11–5 conference record, good for second place. UNCW lost the conference tournament championship game, however, to George Mason, and were thus relegated to play in the 2001 NIT tournament. They would go on to lose the opening round game versus Dayton, 59–68. Blizzard earned his second consecutive All-CAA First Team selection.

=== Junior season ===
In 2001-02, Brett Blizzard led the Seahawks into the NCAA tournament after winning both the Colonial Athletic Association regular season and tournament titles. The Seahawks finished 14–4 in conference play and went on to defeat Virginia Commonwealth University, 66–51, in the conference tournament to earn an automatic March Madness berth. UNCW caught national attention when their #13-seeded Seahawks upset #4 USC in overtime, 93–89, to win their first ever NCAA Tournament game.

Brett scored a team-high 18 points in the contest. Due to his fearless guard play and unique last name, the national media thrust Blizzard into the spotlight and sports commentators would frequently reference him throughout the rest of the tournament. UNCW would lose their next game, however, by a score of 67–76 to Indiana.

He earned his third consecutive All-CAA First Team award and second CAA All-Tournament Team and MVP awards.

=== Senior season ===
By scoring 655 points (109 three-pointers) and eclipsing the 2,000 career point milestone, Blizzard once again led UNCW to the CAA regular season and tournament titles. The Seahawks produced a 15–3 conference record and then defeated Drexel, 70–62, in the CAA Tournament Championship game. Along the way he earned his fourth All-CAA First Team bid and third CAA Tournament MVP award, neither of which had ever been done before (and, to this day, still have not). UNCW entered the 2003 NCAA Men's Division I Basketball Tournament as an #11 seed. They lost their first round match-up against #6-seeded Maryland. Aaron Coombs sank two free throws with five seconds remaining, giving the Seahawks a 73–72 lead and placing them in a position to pull off a tournament surprise for the second year in a row. Instead, Maryland won the game 75–73 by hitting a buzzer beating three-point shot.

Brett Blizzard finished his career with the University of North Carolina Wilmington as the holder of 32 school records and sharer of five others. Among them, he finished as the school's all-time leader in scoring for both single season and career (655 and 2,144), steals for both single season and career (70 and 241), and games started/played (both 125). On February 2, 2005, Blizzard became one of only three Seahawk players ever to have his jersey retired.

== Professional career ==
=== Aurora Basket Jesi ===
In 2003–04, Blizzard got loaned to Sicc BPA Jesi (later renamed Aurora Basket Jesi) from Montepaschi Siena. For the season, he started 41 games and averaged 12.9 points, 2.4 rebounds and 1.1 assists per game.

Following a successful rookie campaign, Blizzard tried to make an NBA roster by participating in two July 2004 NBA Summer Leagues while playing for the Phoenix Suns — the Reebok Rocky Mountain Revue in Salt Lake City, Utah and the Reebok Vegas Summer League in Las Vegas, Nevada. No teams signed him and he went back to Italy.

=== Bennet Cantu Basketball ===
With Cantu; Blizzard averaged 12 points per game in the ULEB, (Union of European Leagues of Basketball), Cup.

=== Reggio Emilia Basketball ===
Blizzard moved to Reggio Emilia where he averaged 13 points

=== Virtus Bologna Basketball ===
In his first year, he was a starter and helped lead Virtus to the championship game against Siena. During the four years at Bologna; Blizzard played in 3 Italian Cup Finals, a Championship Final, a FIBA Cup Final, and captured a FIBA Cup Championship. Blizzard ended his relationship with Bologna in 2010 due to non payment from the club.
