= Joe Jones (basketball) =

American basketball coach (born 1965)

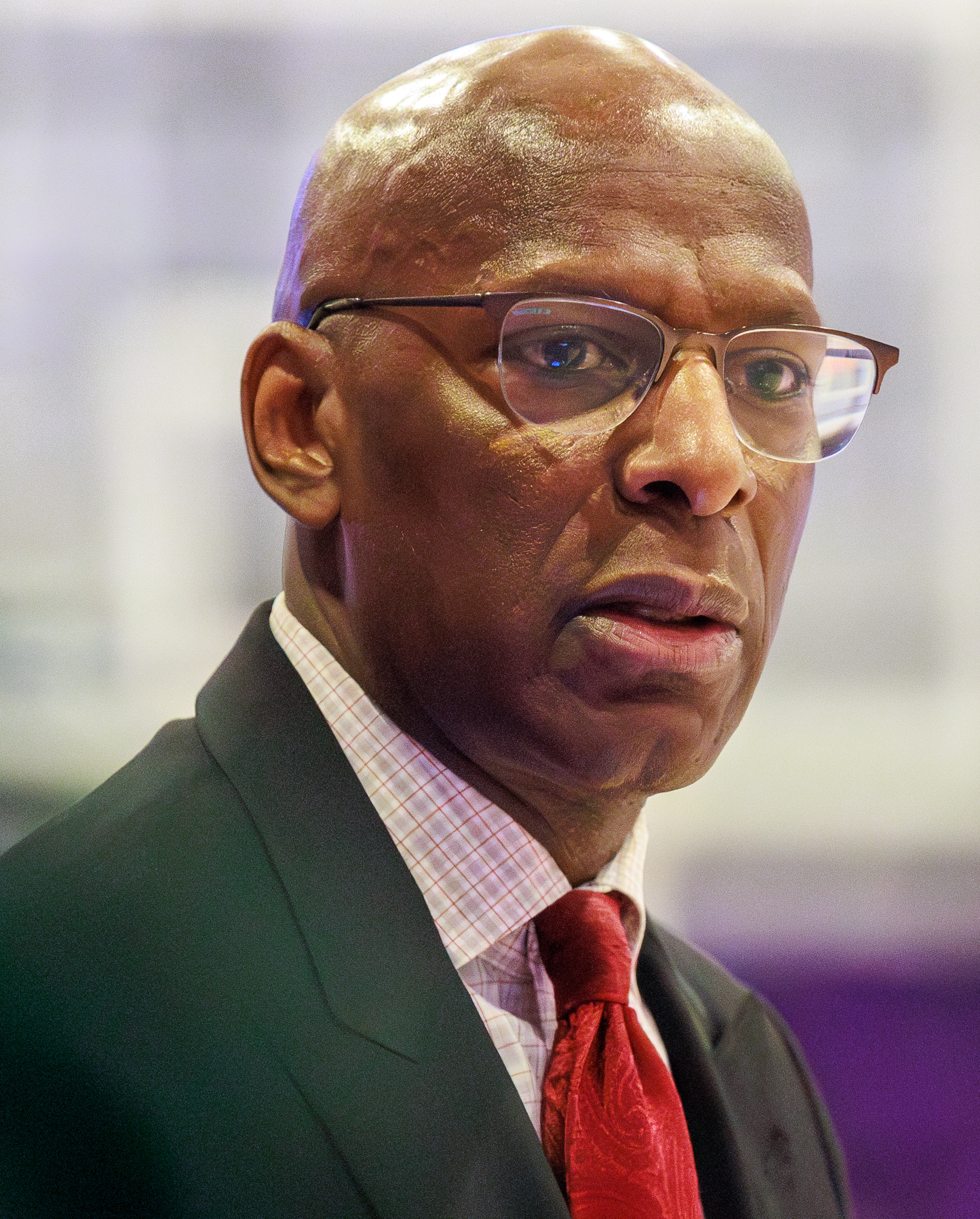
- Jones in 2025

Current position
- Title: Head coach
- Team: Boston University
- Conference: Patriot League
- Record: 256–226 (.531)

Biographical details
- Born: November 9, 1965 (age 61); Ronkonkoma, New York, U.S.

Playing career
- 1983–1987: Oswego
- Position: Point guard

Coaching career (HC unless noted)
- 1994–1997: Hofstra (assistant)
- 1997–2003: Villanova (assistant)
- 2003–2010: Columbia
- 2010–2011: Boston College (assistant)
- 2011–present: Boston University

Head coaching record
- Overall: 342–334 (.506)
- Tournaments: 0–1 (NIT); 1–2 (CIT)

Accomplishments and honors

Championships
- Patriot League regular season (2014); Patriot League tournament (2020)

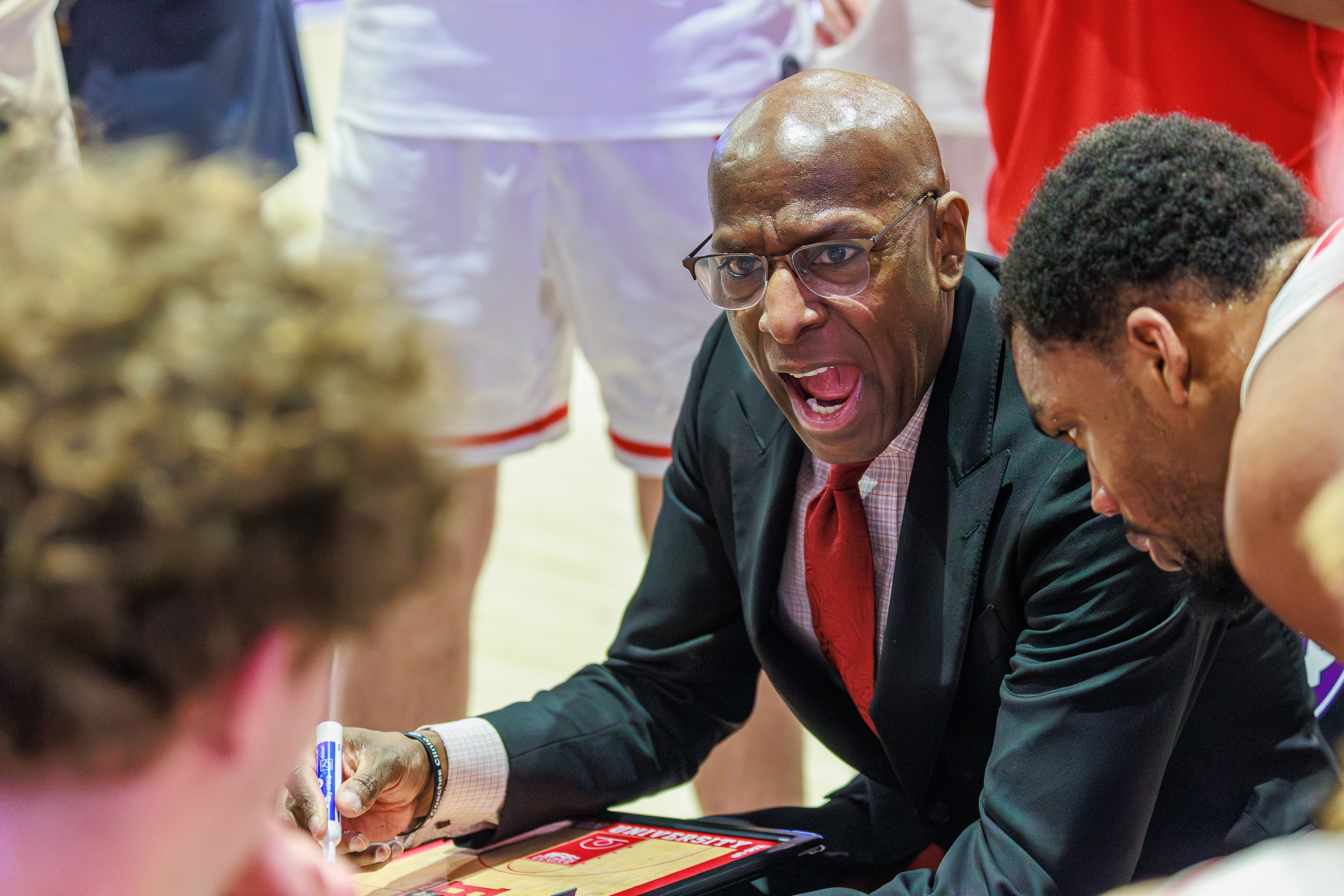
Jones huddles with players

Joseph Fernal Jones (born November 9, 1965) is the head coach of Boston University's men's basketball team. He previously served as the head coach at Columbia University and has worked as an assistant coach at Hofstra University, Villanova University, and Boston College.

== Early life and playing career ==
Jones was born in Ronkonkoma, New York in 1965 and graduated from Half Hollow Hills West High School in Dix Hills, New York in 1983. He was a four-year letter-winner at SUNY Oswego, where he earned a bachelor's degree in communications in 1987 and a master's degree in counseling in 1989. He played point guard for the Lakers and currently ranks 4th in assists and 5th in steals in the school's history.

== Coaching career ==
Jones began his coaching career serving as a guidance counselor and coach of the middle school boys basketball team at Comsewogue on Long Island. He would eventually take over as the head coach of the high school team for two years from 1993 to 1994. He joined Jay Wright's staff at Hofstra University in 1994 and moved on to Villanova University three years later as an assistant to Steve Lappas. When Wright replaced Lappas at Villanova in 2001, Jones remained on the staff as the assistant responsible for recruiting, game scouting and on-court teaching.

=== Columbia University ===
Jones succeeded Armond Hill as the head coach at Columbia University after the 2002–03 season, when Columbia finished 0–14 in the Ivy League, 2–25 overall. In his first season, the Lions finished 6–8 in the league, 10–17 overall – the third-best single-season improvement in conference history. In 2006–07, Jones led the Lions to a 7–7 Ivy League finish, their first .500 record since 1999–2000. Their 16–12 overall record was the team's best since 1992–93. Jones left Columbia with an 86–108 win–loss record over seven seasons.

=== Boston University ===
After leaving Columbia, Jones would serve as the associate head coach at Boston College for one season before accepting the head coaching job at Boston University.

Prior to his second season as head coach at BU, it was announced that BU would be leaving the America East Conference to join the Patriot League on July 1, 2013. As a result of the move, the America East presidents unanimously voted to ban BU from postseason play in all America East sports for the 2012–2013 season. Despite their inability to win the conference championship and earn an automatic bid to the NCAA tournament, Jones took the Terriers to his first-ever postseason as head coach when they played Loyola University Maryland in the first round of the CIT.

In 2020, his 16th year as a head coach, Jones won his first conference tournament title when Boston University defeated Colgate in the championship game of the Patriot League tournament. The victory earned him what would have been his first NCAA tournament appearance as a head coach, but the 2020 tournament was subsequently cancelled in the wake of the COVID-19 pandemic. Jones was named a finalist for the 2019–20 Ben Jobe Award.

== Personal life ==
Jones' brother James is the head men's basketball coach at Yale University.

Jones provided commentary for the online halftime show during the 2008 and 2009 NCAA tournaments.

== Head coaching record ==
Record table
| Season | Team | Overall | Conference | Standing | Postseason |
|---|---|---|---|---|---|
Columbia Lions (Ivy League) (2003–2010)
| 2003–04 | Columbia | 10–17 | 6–8 | T–5th | |
| 2004–05 | Columbia | 12–15 | 3–11 | 8th | |
| 2005–06 | Columbia | 11–16 | 4–10 | T–7th | |
| 2006–07 | Columbia | 16–12 | 7–7 | 4th | |
| 2007–08 | Columbia | 14–15 | 7–7 | T–4th | |
| 2008–09 | Columbia | 12–16 | 7–7 | T–4th | |
| 2009–10 | Columbia | 11–17 | 5–9 | 5th | |
| Columbia: | | 86–108 (.443) | 39–59 (.398) | | |
Boston University Terriers (America East Conference) (2011–2013)
| 2011–12 | Boston University | 16–16 | 12–4 | 3rd | |
| 2012–13 | Boston University | 17–13 | 11–5 | 2nd | CIT First Round |
Boston University Terriers (Patriot League) (2013–present)
| 2013–14 | Boston University | 24–11 | 15–3 | 1st | NIT First Round |
| 2014–15 | Boston University | 13–17 | 9–9 | T–4th | |
| 2015–16 | Boston University | 19–15 | 11–7 | 3rd | CIT Second Round |
| 2016–17 | Boston University | 18–14 | 12–6 | T–2nd | |
| 2017–18 | Boston University | 15–16 | 10–8 | 5th | |
| 2018–19 | Boston University | 15–18 | 7–11 | T–8th | |
| 2019–20 | Boston University | 21–13 | 12–6 | T–2nd | All postseason cancelled |
| 2020–21 | Boston University | 7–11 | 6–10 | 3rd (North) | |
| 2021–22 | Boston University | 22–13 | 11–7 | 3rd | CBI Quarterfinals |
| 2022–23 | Boston University | 15–17 | 8–10 | 5th | |
| 2023–24 | Boston University | 16–17 | 10–8 | T–2nd | |
| 2024–25 | Boston University | 16–16 | 10–8 | T–3rd | |
| 2025–26 | Boston University | 17–17 | 10–8 | 4th | |
| 2026–27 | Boston University | 5–2 | 0–0 | | |
| Boston University: | | 256–226 (.531) | 154–110 (.583) | | |
| Total: | | 342–334 (.506) | | | |
National champion Postseason invitational champion Conference regular season champion Conference regular season and conference tournament champion Division regular season champion Division regular season and conference tournament champion Conference tournament champion
