= 2019–20 Syracuse Orange men's basketball team =

American college basketball season

2019–20 Syracuse Orange men's basketball
- Conference: Atlantic Coast Conference
- Record: 18–14 (10–10 ACC)
- Head coach: Jim Boeheim (44th season)
- Assistant coaches: Adrian Autry; Gerry McNamara; Allen Griffin
- Home arena: Carrier Dome

2019–20 ACC men's basketball standings
	Conf.				Overall
Team	W		L	PCT	W		L	PCT
No. 4 Florida State	16	–	4	.800	26	–	5	.839
No. 16 Virginia	15	–	5	.750	23	–	7	.767
No. 14 Louisville	15	–	5	.750	24	–	7	.774
No. 11 Duke	15	–	5	.750	25	–	6	.806
Georgia Tech*	11	–	9	.550	17	–	14	.548
NC State	10	–	10	.500	20	–	12	.625
Syracuse	10	–	10	.500	18	–	14	.563
Notre Dame	10	–	10	.500	20	–	12	.625
Clemson	9	–	11	.450	16	–	15	.516
Miami (FL)	7	–	13	.350	15	–	16	.484
Boston College	7	–	13	.350	13	–	18	.419
Virginia Tech	7	–	13	.350	16	–	16	.500
Wake Forest	6	–	14	.300	13	–	18	.419
Pittsburgh	6	–	14	.300	16	–	17	.485
North Carolina	6	–	14	.300	14	–	19	.424
*Ineligible for postseason due to NCAA violations. Note: The 2020 ACC tournament was cancelled before the quarterfinals due to the COVID-19 pandemic. Rankings from AP poll

The 2019–20 Syracuse Orange men's basketball team represented Syracuse University during the 2019–20 NCAA Division I men's basketball season. The Orange were led by 44th-year head coach Jim Boeheim and played their home games at the Carrier Dome in Syracuse, New York as seventh-year members of the Atlantic Coast Conference.

The Orange finished the season 18–14, and 10–10 in ACC play. The team was scheduled to play Louisville in the quarterfinals of the ACC tournament before the tournament was cancelled due to the COVID-19 pandemic. The NCAA tournament and NIT were also cancelled due to the pandemic.

== Previous season ==
The Orange finished the 2018–19 season 20–14, 10–8 in ACC play to finish in a tie for sixth place. They defeated Pittsburgh in the second round of the 2019 ACC tournament before losing in the quarterfinals to eventual champions Duke. They received an at-large bid to the NCAA tournament where, as a No. 8 seed, they lost to Baylor in the first round.

== Offseason ==
=== Departures ===
Name	Number	Pos.	Height	Weight	Year	Hometown	Reason for departure
Adrian Autry	0	G	6'0"	185	Senior	Jamesville, NY	Walk-on; graduated
Antonio Balandi	4	G	6'6"	210	Senior	Portland, OR	Walk-on; graduated
Oshae Brissett	11	F	6'8"	210	Sophomore	Mississauga, ON	Play professionally
Paschal Chukwu	13	C	7'2"	228	RS Senior	Westport, CT	Graduated
Frank Howard	23	G	6'5"	205	Senior	Suitland, MD	Graduated
Tyus Battle	25	F	6'6"	205	Junior	Edison, NJ	Play professionally
Ray Featherston	32	G	5'8"	150	Junior	Wallingford, CT	Walk-on; left the team for personal reasons
Ky Feldman	54	G	5'10"	155	Senior	Agoura Hills, CA	Walk-on; graduated

=== 2019 recruiting class ===
College recruiting information
Name	Hometown	School	Height	Weight	Commit date
Brycen Goodine #12 SG	Providence, Rhode Island	St. Andrews School (R.I.)	6 ft 3 in (1.91 m)	185 lb (84 kg)	Sep 13, 2017
Brycen Goodine #12 SG	Recruit ratings: Scout: Rivals: 247Sports: ESPN: (85)				
Joseph Girard III #11 G	Glens Falls, NY	Glens Falls Senior High School	6 ft 1 in (1.85 m)	178 lb (81 kg)	Oct 14, 2018
Joseph Girard III #11 G	Recruit ratings: Scout: Rivals: 247Sports: ESPN: (81)				
John Bol Ajak #8 C	West Chester, PA	Westtown School	6 ft 10 in (2.08 m)	205 lb (93 kg)	Oct 2, 2018
John Bol Ajak #8 C	Recruit ratings: Scout: Rivals: 247Sports: ESPN: (70)				
Quincy Guerrier #6 SF	Quebec City, QC	Thetford Academy	6 ft 7 in (2.01 m)	190 lb (86 kg)	Oct 31, 2018
Quincy Guerrier #6 SF	Recruit ratings: Scout: Rivals: 247Sports: ESPN: (NR)				
Jesse Edwards #14 C	Bradenton, FL	IMG Academy	6 ft 10 in (2.08 m)	205 lb (93 kg)	Apr 5, 2019
Jesse Edwards #14 C	Recruit ratings: Scout: Rivals: 247Sports: ESPN: (79)				
Overall recruit ranking:
Note: In many cases, Scout, Rivals, 247Sports, On3, and ESPN may conflict in their listings of height and weight.; In these cases, the average was taken. ESPN grades are on a 100-point scale.; Sources: "2019 Syracuse Signees". Rivals.; "2019 Syracuse Signees". Scout.; "2019 Syracuse Signees". ESPN.; "Scout.com Team Recruiting Rankings". Scout.; "2019 Team Ranking". Rivals.

== Roster ==
2019–20 Syracuse Orange men's basketball team
Players
Coaches

Pos.	#	Name	Height	Weight	Year	Previous school	Hometown
G	0	Brycen Goodine	6 ft 3 in (1.91 m)	183 lb (83 kg)	Fr	St. Andrews (RI)	New Bedford, Massachusetts
G	1	Quincy Guerrier	6 ft 7 in (2.01 m)	220 lb (100 kg)	Fr	Thetford Academy	Montreal, Quebec
C	2	John Bol Ajak	6 ft 10 in (2.08 m)	215 lb (98 kg)	Fr	Westtown School	Natinga, South Sudan
G	5	Jalen Carey	6 ft 3 in (1.91 m)	186 lb (84 kg)	So	Immaculate Conception School	New York, New York
G	10	Howard Washington	6 ft 3 in (1.91 m)	175 lb (79 kg)	Jr	Athletic Institute Prep	Buffalo, New York
G	11	Joseph Girard III	6 ft 1 in (1.85 m)	181 lb (82 kg)	Fr	Glens Falls	Glens Falls, New York
G	12	Brendan Paul (W)	6 ft 2 in (1.88 m)	175 lb (79 kg)	So	Brewster Academy	Gates Mills, Ohio
G	13	Chris Lavalle (W)	5 ft 11 in (1.8 m)	175 lb (79 kg)	Jr	West Genesee	Syracuse, New York
C	14	Jesse Edwards	6 ft 11 in (2.11 m)	215 lb (98 kg)	Fr	IMG Academy	Amsterdam, Netherlands
F	20	Robert Braswell	6 ft 7 in (2.01 m)	200 lb (91 kg)	So	Blythewood	Jacksonville, Florida
F	21	Marek Doležaj	6 ft 10 in (2.08 m)	185 lb (84 kg)	Jr	MBK Karlovka Bratislava	Bratislava, Slovakia
G	24	Shaun Belbey	5 ft 10 in (1.78 m)	165 lb (75 kg)	RS Sr	Christian Brothers Academy	Brick, New Jersey
F	32	Nick Giancola (W)	6 ft 5 in (1.96 m)	183 lb (83 kg)	Jr	Lexington Catholic	Lexington, Kentucky
G	33	Elijah Hughes	6 ft 6 in (1.98 m)	215 lb (98 kg)	RS Jr	John F. Kennedy; East Carolina	Beacon, New York
F	34	Bourama Sidibe	6 ft 10 in (2.08 m)	210 lb (95 kg)	Jr	St. Benedict's Prep	Bamako, Mali
G	35	Buddy Boeheim	6 ft 6 in (1.98 m)	195 lb (88 kg)	So	Brewster Academy	Syracuse, New York

Head coach

- Jim Boeheim, 44th yr. (Syracuse, 1966)

Assistant coach(es)

- Adrian Autry, 9th yr. (Syracuse, 1994)
- Gerry McNamara, 11th yr. (Syracuse, 2007)
- Allen Griffin, 3rd yr. (Syracuse, 2001)

Legend

- (C) Team captain
- (S) Suspended
- (I) Ineligible
- (W) Walk-on
- Injured
- Current redshirt

Roster
Last update: November 4, 2019

== Schedule and results ==
Date time, TV	Rank^{#}	Opponent^{#}	Result	Record	High points	High rebounds	High assists	Site (attendance) city, state
Exhibition
October 26, 2019*; 7:00 pm, ACCNX		Daemen	W 90–71	–	24 – Hughes	10 – Sidibe	5 – Hughes	Carrier Dome (5,773); Syracuse, NY
October 29, 2019*; 8:00 pm, ACCNX		Carleton	W 77–58	–	15 – Hughes	10 – Hughes	5 – Dolezaj	Carrier Dome (4,778); Syracuse, NY
Regular season
November 6, 2019; 9:00 pm, ACCN		No. 11 Virginia	L 34–48	0–1 (0–1)	14 – Hughes	9 – Dolezaj	2 – Tied	Carrier Dome (22,518); Syracuse, NY
November 13, 2019*; 7:00 pm, ACCRSN		Colgate	W 70–54	1–1	17 – Boeheim	14 – Sidibe	8 – Hughes	Carrier Dome (21,281); Syracuse, NY
November 16, 2019*; 7:00 pm, ACCNX		Seattle; NIT Season Tip-Off campus site game	W 89–67	2–1	24 – Girard III	7 – Guerrier	4 – 3 tied	Carrier Dome (21,487); Syracuse, NY
November 20, 2019*; 7:30 pm, ACCNX		Cornell	W 72–53	3–1	23 – Hughes	8 – Dolezaj	7 – Hughes	Carrier Dome (21,123); Syracuse, NY
November 23, 2019*; 12:00 pm, ACCN		Bucknell; NIT Season Tip-Off campus site game	W 97–46	4–1	22 – Boeheim	9 – Sidibe	6 – Girard III	Carrier Dome (17,181); Syracuse, NY
November 27, 2019*; 7:00 pm, ESPN2		vs. Oklahoma State; NIT Season Tip-Off semifinals	L 72–86	4–2	28 – Hughes	9 – Sidibe	9 – Girard III	Barclays Center (4,114); Brooklyn, NY
November 29, 2019*; 7:00 pm, ESPN2		vs. Penn State; NIT Season Tip-Off	L 64–85	4–3	19 – Hughes	10 – Guerrier	7 – Girard III	Barclays Center (17,732); Brooklyn, NY
December 3, 2019*; 7:00 pm, ESPN2		Iowa; ACC–Big Ten Challenge	L 54–68	4–4	12 – Dolezaj	8 – Sidibe	4 – Girard III	Carrier Dome (20,844); Syracuse, NY
December 7, 2019; 12:00 pm, ACCN		at Georgia Tech	W 97–63	5–4 (1–1)	33 – Hughes	9 – Dolezaj	8 – Washington	McCamish Pavilion (5,743); Atlanta, GA
December 14, 2019*; 1:00 pm, FOX		at Georgetown; Rivalry	L 79–89	5–5	25 – Boeheim	9 – Dolezaj	9 – Hughes	Capital One Arena (15,102); Washington, D.C.
December 18, 2019*; 8:00 pm, ESPNU		Oakland	W 74–62	6–5	23 – Hughes	13 – Sidibe	7 – Girard III	Carrier Dome (16,394); Syracuse, NY
December 21, 2019*; 6:00 pm, ESPNU		North Florida	W 82–70	7–5	18 – Hughes	8 – Sidibe	8 – Dolezaj	Carrier Dome (17,537); Syracuse, NY
December 28, 2019*; 7:00 pm, ACCNX		Niagara	W 71–57	8–5	19 – Hughes	13 – Sidibe	9 – Hughes	Carrier Dome (18,125); Syracuse, NY
January 4, 2020; 4:00 pm, ESPN2		Notre Dame	L 87–88	8–6 (1–2)	23 – Boeheim	10 – Dolezaj	7 – Dolezaj	Carrier Dome (19,821); Syracuse, NY
January 7, 2020; 9:00 pm, ACCN		Virginia Tech	L 63–67	8–7 (1–3)	18 – Hughes	9 – Guerrier	2 – Hughes	Carrier Dome (16,504); Syracuse, NY
January 11, 2020; 4:00 pm, ESPN		at No. 18 Virginia	W 63–55 ^{OT}	9–7 (2–3)	19 – Girard III	11 – Dolezaj	5 – Dolezaj	John Paul Jones Arena (14,133); Charlottesville, VA
January 15, 2020; 6:30 pm, ACCN		Boston College	W 76–50	10–7 (3–3)	22 – Boeheim	11 – Dolezaj	5 – Hughes	Carrier Dome (21,645); Syracuse, NY
January 18, 2020; 12:00 pm, ACCRSN		at Virginia Tech	W 71–69	11–7 (4–3)	26 – Boeheim	11 – Dolezaj	2 – 4 tied	Cassell Coliseum (9,275); Blacksburg, VA
January 22, 2020; 7:00 pm, ESPN2		at Notre Dame	W 84–82	12–7 (5–3)	26 – Hughes	9 – Girard III	4 – Girard III	Edmund P. Joyce Center (7,492); South Bend, IN
January 25, 2020; 12:00 pm, ACCN		Pittsburgh	W 69–61	13–7 (6–3)	21 – Boeheim	8 – 2 Tied	4 – Hughes	Carrier Dome (23,711); Syracuse, NY
January 28, 2020; 7:00 pm, ACCRSN		at Clemson	L 70–71	13–8 (6–4)	22 – Tied	5 – Guerrier	2 – Hughes	Littlejohn Coliseum (6,402); Clemson, SC
February 1, 2020; 8:00 pm, ESPN		No. 9 Duke	L 88–97	13–9 (6–5)	22 – Dolezaj	7 – Tied	7 – Girard III	Carrier Dome (31,458); Syracuse, NY
February 8, 2020; 8:00 pm, ACCN		Wake Forest	W 75–73	14–9 (7–5)	23 – Boeheim	8 – Hughes	4 – Dolezaj	Carrier Dome (21,824); Syracuse, NY
February 11, 2020; 7:00 pm, ESPN2		NC State	L 74–79	14–10 (7–6)	30 – Girard III	10 – Guerrier	3 – Boeheim	Carrier Dome (22,137); Syracuse, NY
February 15, 2020; 12:00 pm, ESPN2		at No. 8 Florida State	L 77–80	14–11 (7–7)	25 – Hughes	7 – Girard III	5 – Girard III	Donald L. Tucker Center (11,500); Tallahassee, FL
February 19, 2020; 7:00 pm, ESPN		at No. 11 Louisville	L 66–90	14–12 (7–8)	15 – Boeheim	12 – Guerrier	2 – Tied	KFC Yum! Center (16,428); Louisville, KY
February 22, 2020; 4:00 pm, ACCRSN		Georgia Tech	W 79–72	15–12 (8–8)	20 – Tied	10 – Sidibe	7 – Hughes	Carrier Dome (26,661); Syracuse, NY
February 26, 2020; 7:00 pm, ACCN		at Pittsburgh	W 72–49	16–12 (9–8)	25 – Hughes	10 – Sidibe	4 – Goodine	Petersen Events Center (9,001); Pittsburgh, PA
February 29, 2020; 4:00 pm, ESPN		North Carolina	L 79–92	16–13 (9–9)	22 – Boeheim	15 – Sidibe	3 – 3 tied	Carrier Dome (29,312); Syracuse, NY
March 3, 2020; 7:00 pm, ESPN2		at Boston College	W 84–71	17–13 (10–9)	28 – Hughes	12 – Sidibe	4 – Dolezaj	Conte Forum (6,471); Chestnut Hill, MA
March 7, 2020; 4:00 pm, ACCN		at Miami (FL)	L 65–69 ^{OT}	17–14 (10–10)	17 – Dolezaj	10 – Sidibe	4 – Girard III	Watsco Center (6,025); Coral Gables, FL
ACC tournament
March 11, 2020; 9:00 pm, ESPN2	(6)	vs. (14) North Carolina; Second round	W 81–53	18–14	27 – Hughes	13 – Sidibe	8 – Girard III	Greensboro Coliseum (20,809); Greensboro, NC
March 12, 2020; 9:00 pm, ESPN	(6)	vs. (3) No. 15 Louisville; Quarterfinals	ACC Tournament Canceled					Greensboro Coliseum; Greensboro, NC
*Non-conference game. ^{#}Rankings from AP Poll. (#) Tournament seedings in parentheses. All times are in Eastern Time.

== Rankings ==
Ranking movements Legend: RV = Received votes
	Week																			
Poll	Pre	1	2	3	4	5	6	7	8	9	10	11	12	13	14	15	16	17	18	Final
AP	RV																			Not released
Coaches	RV	^																		

*AP does not release post-NCAA Tournament rankings
^Coaches did not release a Week 2 poll.
