= 2019–20 Virginia Tech Hokies men's basketball team =

American college basketball season

2019–20 Virginia Tech Hokies men's basketball
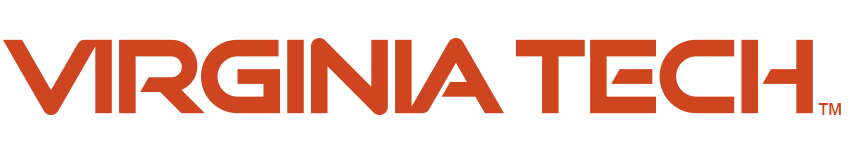
- Conference: Atlantic Coast Conference
- Record: 16–16 (7–13 ACC)
- Head coach: Mike Young (1st season)
- Assistant coaches: Chester Frazier; Antwon Jackson; Christian Webster
- Home arena: Cassell Coliseum

2019–20 ACC men's basketball standings
	Conf.				Overall
Team	W		L	PCT	W		L	PCT
No. 4 Florida State	16	–	4	.800	26	–	5	.839
No. 16 Virginia	15	–	5	.750	23	–	7	.767
No. 14 Louisville	15	–	5	.750	24	–	7	.774
No. 11 Duke	15	–	5	.750	25	–	6	.806
Georgia Tech*	11	–	9	.550	17	–	14	.548
NC State	10	–	10	.500	20	–	12	.625
Syracuse	10	–	10	.500	18	–	14	.563
Notre Dame	10	–	10	.500	20	–	12	.625
Clemson	9	–	11	.450	16	–	15	.516
Miami (FL)	7	–	13	.350	15	–	16	.484
Boston College	7	–	13	.350	13	–	18	.419
Virginia Tech	7	–	13	.350	16	–	16	.500
Wake Forest	6	–	14	.300	13	–	18	.419
Pittsburgh	6	–	14	.300	16	–	17	.485
North Carolina	6	–	14	.300	14	–	19	.424
*Ineligible for postseason due to NCAA violations. Note: The 2020 ACC tournament was cancelled before the quarterfinals due to the COVID-19 pandemic. Rankings from AP poll

The 2019–20 Virginia Tech Hokies men's basketball team represented Virginia Polytechnic Institute and State University during the 2019–20 NCAA Division I men's basketball season. The Hokies were led by first-year head coach Mike Young and played their home games at Cassell Coliseum in Blacksburg, Virginia as members of the Atlantic Coast Conference.

The Hokies finished the season 16–16, and 7–13 in ACC play. They lost to North Carolina in the first round of the ACC tournament. The tournament was cancelled before the Quarterfinals due to the COVID-19 pandemic. The NCAA tournament and NIT were also cancelled due to the pandemic.

== Previous season ==
They finished the 2018–19 season 26–9, 12–6 in ACC play to finish in fifth place. They defeated Miami (FL) in the second round of the ACC tournament before losing to Florida State. They received an at-large bid to the NCAA tournament where they defeated Saint Louis and Liberty to advanced to the sweet sixteen for the first time since 1965 where they lost to fellow ACC member Duke.

== Offseason ==
=== Departures ===
Name	Number	Pos.	Height	Weight	Year	Hometown	Reason for departure
Justin Robinson	5	G	6'1"	205	Senior	Manassas, VA	Graduated
Ahmed Hill	13	G	6'5"	205	RS Senior	Augusta, GA	Graduated
Nickeil Alexander-Walker	4	G	6'5"	220	Sophomore	Toronto, ON	Declared for 2019 NBA draft; selected 17th overall by the Brooklyn Nets.
Kerry Blackshear Jr.	24	F	6'10"	250	RS Junior	Orlando, FL	Graduate transferred to Florida
Ty Outlaw	42	G/F	6'6"	220	Graduate Student	Roxboro, NC	Graduated
Chris Clarke	15	G/F	6'6"	215	Senior	Virginia Beach, VA	Transferred to Texas Tech

=== Incoming transfers ===
Name	Pos.	Height	Weight	Year	Hometown	Notes
Grant Yates	F	6'8"	210	Sophomore	Gainesville, VA	Transferred from Christopher Newport. Under NCAA transfer rules, Yates will have to sit out for the 2019–20 season. Will have three years of remaining eligibility.
Keve Aluma	F	6'9"	240	Junior	Berlin, MD	Transferred from Wofford. Under NCAA transfer rules, Aluma will have to sit out for the 2019–20 season. Will have two years of remaining eligibility.
Branden Johnson	F	6'8"	230	Graduate Student	Garfield Heights, OH	Transferred from Alabama State after graduating. Will have one year of eligibility beginning immediately.

=== 2019 recruiting class ===
College recruiting information
Name	Hometown	School	Height	Weight	Commit date
Jalen Cone; PG	Walkertown, NC	Walkertown	5 ft 11 in (1.80 m)	163 lb (74 kg)	May 9, 2019
Jalen Cone; PG	Recruit ratings: Scout: Rivals: 247Sports: ESPN:				
John Ojiako; PF	St. Petersburg, FL	Admiral Farragut Academy	6 ft 10 in (2.08 m)	190 lb (86 kg)	Jun 18, 2019
John Ojiako; PF	Recruit ratings: Scout: Rivals: 247Sports: ESPN:				
Nahiem Alleyne; SG	Lawrenceville, GA	Mountain View	6 ft 3 in (1.91 m)	170 lb (77 kg)	Jun 16, 2019
Nahiem Alleyne; SG	Recruit ratings: Scout: Rivals: 247Sports: ESPN:				
Hunter Cattoor; PG	Orlando, FL	Bishop Moore	6 ft 2 in (1.88 m)	185 lb (84 kg)	Apr 20, 2019
Hunter Cattoor; PG	Recruit ratings: Scout: Rivals: 247Sports: ESPN:				
Overall recruit ranking: 247Sports: 47
Note: In many cases, Scout, Rivals, 247Sports, On3, and ESPN may conflict in their listings of height and weight.; In these cases, the average was taken. ESPN grades are on a 100-point scale.; Sources: "2019 Team Ranking". Rivals.

== Roster ==
2019–20 Virginia Tech Hokies men's basketball team
Players
Coaches

Pos.	#	Name	Height	Weight	Year	Previous school	Hometown
G	0	Hunter Cattoor	6 ft 3 in (1.91 m)	205 lb (93 kg)	Fr	Bishop Moore	Orlando, FL
G	1	Isaiah Wilikins	6 ft 4 in (1.93 m)	225 lb (102 kg)	So	Mount Tabor	Winston-Salem, NC
G/F	2	Landers Nolley II	6 ft 7 in (2.01 m)	225 lb (102 kg)	RS Fr	Langston Hughes	Atlanta, GA
G	3	Wabissa Bede	6 ft 0 in (1.83 m)	200 lb (91 kg)	Jr	Cushing Academy	North Andover, MA
G	4	Nahiem Alleyne	6 ft 3 in (1.91 m)	195 lb (88 kg)	Fr	Mountain View	Buford, Georgia
G	10	Jonathan Kabongo	6 ft 4 in (1.93 m)	195 lb (88 kg)	So	Thornlea Secondary	Toronto, Ontario
G	11	Brendan Palmer	6 ft 3 in (1.91 m)	190 lb (86 kg)	So	Forsyth Country Day	Lewisville, North Carolina
F	13	Grant Yates (redshirt)	6 ft 8 in (2.03 m)	210 lb (95 kg)	So	Christopher Newport	Gainesville, Virginia
G	14	P. J. Horne	6 ft 5 in (1.96 m)	230 lb (104 kg)	Jr	Tift County	Tifton, Georgia
G	15	Jalen Cone	5 ft 10 in (1.78 m)	170 lb (77 kg)	Fr	Walkertown	Walkertown, North Carolina
F	21	John Ojiako	6 ft 10 in (2.08 m)	240 lb (109 kg)	Fr	Admiral Farragut	Lagos, Nigeria
F	22	Keve Aluma (redshirt)	6 ft 9 in (2.06 m)	240 lb (109 kg)	Jr	Wofford	Berlin, Maryland
G	23	Tyrece Radford	6 ft 2 in (1.88 m)	195 lb (88 kg)	RS Fr	McKinley	Baton Rouge, Louisiana
F	24	Branden Johnson	6 ft 8 in (2.03 m)	230 lb (104 kg)	GS	Alabama State	Garfield Heights, Ohio
F	25	Ryan Payne	6 ft 8 in (2.03 m)	220 lb (100 kg)	Jr	Hanover	Mechanicsville, Virginia

Head coach

- Mike Young (Emory & Henry)

Assistant coach(es)

- Chester Frazier (Illinois)
- Christian Webster (Harvard)
- Antwon Jackson (Pikeville)

Legend

- (C) Team captain
- (S) Suspended
- (I) Ineligible
- (W) Walk-on
- Injured
- Current redshirt

Roster

== Schedule and results ==
Date time, TV	Rank^{#}	Opponent^{#}	Result	Record	High points	High rebounds	High assists	Site (attendance) city, state
Regular season
November 5, 2019; 7:00 pm, ESPNU		at Clemson	W 67–60	1–0 (1–0)	30 – Nolley	9 – Bede	6 – Bede	Littlejohn Coliseum (7,500); Clemson, SC
November 8, 2019*; 7:00 pm, ACCNX		Coppin State	W 74–42	2–0	18 – Alleyne	9 – Bede	10 – Bede	Cassell Coliseum (9,275); Blacksburg, VA
November 13, 2019*; 7:00 pm, ACCNX		USC Upstate	W 80–57	3–0	23 – Nolley	6 – Nolley	8 – Bede	Cassell Coliseum (8,536); Blacksburg, VA
November 16, 2019*; 1:30 pm, ACCNX		Lehigh	W 79–53	4–0	27 – Nolley	11 – Radford	6 – Bede	Cassell Coliseum (9,900); Blacksburg, VA
November 20, 2019*; 7:00 pm, ACCNX		Delaware State	W 100–64	5–0	20 – Alleyne	8 – Radford	10 – Bede	Cassell Coliseum (8,421); Blacksburg, VA
November 25, 2019*; 5:00 pm, ESPN2		vs. No. 3 Michigan State; Maui Invitational quarterfinals	W 71–66	6–0	22 – Nolley	7 – Horne	5 – Nolley	Lahaina Civic Center; Lahaina, HI
November 26, 2019*; 8:00 pm, ESPN		vs. Dayton; Maui Invitational semifinals	L 62–89	6–1	15 – Nolley II	6 – Nolley II	6 – Bede	Lahaina Civic Center (2,400); Lahaina, HI
November 27, 2019*; 11:30 pm, ESPN2		vs. BYU; Maui Invitational 3rd place game	L 77–90	6–2	22 – Nolley II	7 – Nolley II	7 – Bede	Lahaina Civic Center (2,400); Lahaina, HI
December 6, 2019; 7:00 pm, ACCN		No. 10 Duke	L 63–77	6–3 (1–1)	15 – Horne	8 – Nolley II	5 – Bede	Cassell Coliseum (9,275); Blacksburg, VA
December 11, 2019*; 8:30 pm, ACCNX		Chattanooga	W 63–58	7–3	22 – Alleyne	8 – Bede	7 – Bede	Cassell Coliseum (8,348); Blacksburg, VA
December 15, 2019*; 1:30 pm, ACCNX		Gardner–Webb	W 73–46	8–3	18 – Nolley II	10 – Radford	5 – Bede	Cassell Coliseum (9,275); Blacksburg, VA
December 21, 2019*; 4:00 pm, ACCNX		VMI	W 64–55	9–3	14 – Cattoor	10 – Radford	4 – Radford	Cassell Coliseum (7,446); Blacksburg, VA
December 29, 2019*; 6:00 pm, ACCRSN		Maryland Eastern Shore	W 92–37	10–3	18 – Nolley II	10 – Nolley II	6 – Bede	Cassell Coliseum (7,642); Blacksburg, VA
January 4, 2020; 2:00 pm, ACCRSN		at No. 19 Virginia; Commonwealth Classic	L 39–65	10–4 (1–2)	18 – Nolley II	5 – Tied	2 – Tied	John Paul Jones Arena (14,629); Charlottesville, VA
January 7, 2020; 9:00 pm, ACCN		at Syracuse	W 67–63	11–4 (2–2)	19 – Cone	9 – Radford	8 – Bede	Carrier Dome (16,504); Syracuse, NY
January 11, 2020; 2:00 pm, ACCRSN		NC State	W 72–58	12–4 (3–2)	29 – Nolley II	9 – Radford	7 – Bede	Cassell Coliseum (9,275); Blacksburg, VA
January 14, 2020; 9:00 pm, ACCN		at Wake Forest	W 80–70	13–4 (4–2)	21 – Tied	13 – Radford	9 – Bede	LJVM Coliseum (4,873); Winston-Salem, NC
January 18, 2020; 12:00 pm, ACCRSN		Syracuse	L 69–71	13–5 (4–3)	17 – Alleyne	6 – Tied	7 – Nolley II	Cassell Coliseum (9,275); Blacksburg, VA
January 22, 2020; 8:00 pm, ACCN		North Carolina	W 79–77 ^{2OT}	14–5 (5–3)	22 – Nolley II	7 – Tied	8 – Bede	Cassell Coliseum (9,275); Blacksburg, VA
January 25, 2020; 2:00 pm, ESPNU		at Boston College	L 56–61	14–6 (5–4)	15 – Nolley II	9 – Radford	5 – Bede	Conte Forum (6,981); Chestnut Hill, MA
January 28, 2020; 8:00 pm, ACCN		at Miami (FL)	L 61–71	14–7 (5–5)	24 – Radford	8 – Radford	8 – Bede	Watsco Center (5,197); Coral Gables, FL
February 1, 2020; 4:00 pm, ACCRSN		No. 5 Florida State	L 63–74	14–8 (5–6)	18 – Radford	7 – Nolley II	6 – Bede	Cassell Coliseum (9,275); Blacksburg, VA
February 4, 2020; 7:00 pm, ACCN		at Georgia Tech	L 57–76	14–9 (5–7)	12 – Radford	7 – Nolley II	3 – Cattoor	McCamish Pavilion (4,727); Atlanta, GA
February 8, 2020; 12:00 pm, ACCRSN		Boston College	L 73–77 ^{OT}	14–10 (5–8)	29 – Nolley II	11 – Nolley II	4 – Radford	Cassell Coliseum (9,275); Blacksburg, VA
February 15, 2020; 6:00 pm, ACCN		Pittsburgh	W 67–57	15–10 (6–8)	18 – Horne	12 – Nolley II	6 – Nolley II	Cassell Coliseum (9,275); Blacksburg, VA
February 19, 2020; 9:00 pm, ACCRSN		Miami (FL)	L 95–102 ^{3OT}	15–11 (6–9)	26 – Radford	11 – Nolley II	6 – Bede	Cassell Coliseum (8,428); Blacksburg, VA
February 22, 2020; 8:00 pm, ESPN2		at No. 6 Duke	L 64–88	15–12 (6–10)	16 – Radford	9 – Radford	5 – Wilkins	Cameron Indoor Stadium (9,314); Durham, NC
February 26, 2020; 7:00 pm, ESPN2		Virginia; Commonwealth Classic	L 53–56	15–13 (6–11)	13 – Nolley II	5 – Nolley II	3 – Bede	Cassell Coliseum (9,275); Blacksburg, VA
March 1, 2020; 6:00 pm, ACCN		at No. 11 Louisville	L 52–68	15–14 (6–12)	15 – Cone	9 – Radford	4 – Bede	KFC Yum! Center (18,104); Louisville, KY
March 4, 2020; 7:00 pm, ACCN		Clemson	W 70–58	16–14 (7–12)	17 – Horne	8 – Nolley II	5 – Bede	Cassell Coliseum (8,901); Blacksburg, VA
March 7, 2020; 2:00 pm, ACCN		Notre Dame	L 56–64	16–15 (7–13)	14 – Horne	7 – Horne	5 – Bede	Purcell Pavilion (8,301); South Bend, IN
ACC tournament
March 10, 2020; 7:00 pm, ACCN	(11)	vs. (14) North Carolina; First round	L 56–78	16–16	14 – Cattoor	7 – Ojiako	5 – Bede	Greensboro Coliseum (13,310); Greensboro, NC
*Non-conference game. ^{#}Rankings from AP Poll. (#) Tournament seedings in parentheses. All times are in Eastern Time.
