= 2019–20 American Eagles men's basketball team =

American college basketball season

2019–20 American Eagles men's basketball
- Conference: Patriot League
- Record: 16–14 (12–6 Patriot)
- Head coach: Mike Brennan (7th season)
- Assistant coaches: Scott Greenman; Matt Wolff; Eddie Jackson
- Home arena: Bender Arena

2019–20 Patriot League men's basketball standings
	Conf.				Overall
Team	W		L	PCT	W		L	PCT
Colgate	14	–	4	.778	25	–	9	.735
American	12	–	6	.667	16	–	14	.533
Boston University †	12	–	6	.667	21	–	13	.618
Army	10	–	8	.556	15	–	15	.500
Lafayette	10	–	8	.556	19	–	12	.613
Navy	8	–	10	.444	14	–	16	.467
Bucknell	8	–	10	.444	14	–	20	.412
Lehigh	7	–	11	.389	11	–	21	.344
Loyola (MD)	7	–	11	.389	15	–	17	.469
Holy Cross	2	–	16	.111	3	–	29	.094
† 2020 Patriot League tournament winner

The 2019–20 American Eagles men's basketball team represented American University during the 2019–20 NCAA Division I men's basketball season. The Eagles, led by seventh-year head coach Mike Brennan, play their home games at Bender Arena in Washington, D.C. as members of the Patriot League. They finished the season 16–14, 12–6 in Patriot League play to finish in a tie for second place. They lost in the quarterfinals of the Patriot League tournament to Bucknell.

== Previous season ==
The Eagles finished the 2018–19 season 15–15, 9–9 in Patriot League play to finish in fourth place. They lost in the quarterfinals of the Patriot League tournament to Navy.

== Roster ==
2019–20 American Eagles men's basketball team
Players
Coaches

Pos.	#	Name	Height	Weight	Year	Previous school	Hometown
G	0	Sa'eed Nelson	6 ft 2 in (1.88 m)	190 lb (86 kg)	Sr	St. Augustine Prep	Pleasantville, New Jersey
G	2	Stacy Beckton Jr.	6 ft 4 in (1.93 m)	186 lb (84 kg)	Jr	Atlantic	Daytona Beach, Florida
G	4	Jamir Harris	6 ft 2 in (1.88 m)	198 lb (90 kg)	Jr	The Patrick School	North Brunswick, New Jersey
F	5	Connor Nelson	6 ft 6 in (1.98 m)	220 lb (100 kg)	So	Central Wyoming College	Denver, Colorado
F	10	Jesse Little	6 ft 10 in (2.08 m)	204 lb (93 kg)	Jr	Starkville	Starkville, Mississippi
F	12	Yilret Yiljep	6 ft 7 in (2.01 m)	250 lb (113 kg)	GS	Westtown	Jos, Nigeria
G	13	Marvin Bragg	6 ft 6 in (1.98 m)	195 lb (88 kg)	Jr	Gahr	Cerritos, California
F	21	Josh Alexander	6 ft 8 in (2.03 m)	243 lb (110 kg)	So	Iona Prep	Carmel, New York
F/C	23	Mark Gasperini	6 ft 10 in (2.08 m)	245 lb (111 kg)	Sr	Brimmer and May School	Moscow, Russia
G	30	Ben Lubarsky	6 ft 5 in (1.96 m)	210 lb (95 kg)	Fr	The Benjamin School	Palm Beach, Florida
G	33	Christian Sutton	6 ft 3 in (1.91 m)	193 lb (88 kg)	So	Riverwood	Atlanta, Georgia
G	41	Jacob Boonyasith	6 ft 3 in (1.91 m)	215 lb (98 kg)	So	Jenison	Grand Rapids, Michigan

Head coach

- Mike Brennan (Princeton)

Assistant coach(es)

- Scott Greenman (Princeton)
- Matt Wolff (Boston University)
- Eddie Jackson (Ohio State)

Legend

- (C) Team captain
- (S) Suspended
- (I) Ineligible
- (W) Walk-on
- Injured
- Current redshirt

Roster
Last update: February 5, 2020

== Schedule and results ==
Date time, TV	Rank^{#}	Opponent^{#}	Result	Record	Site (attendance) city, state
Non-conference regular season
Nov 5, 2019*; 7:30 pm, ESPN+		at Siena	L 80–96	0–1	Times Union Center (5,371); Albany, NY
Nov 8, 2019*; 7:00 pm		William & Mary	L 70–79	0–2	Bender Arena (1,018); Washington, D.C.
Nov 12, 2019*; 7:00 pm, ESPN+		at George Washington	W 67–65	1–2	Charles E. Smith Center (2,353); Washington, D.C.
Nov 16, 2019*; 7:00 pm, ESPN3		at Saint Francis (PA)	L 76–79	1–3	DeGol Arena (1,308); Loretto, PA
Nov 26, 2019*; 7:00 pm		Howard	W 86–69	2–3	Bender Arena (504); Washington, D.C.
Nov 30, 2019*; 10:00 am, ESPN+		at Albany	L 64–68	2–4	SEFCU Arena (1,506); Guilderland, NY
Dec 3, 2019*; 7:00 pm, NBCSWA		UMBC	W 85–61	3–4	Bender Arena (789); Washington, D.C.
Dec 7, 2019*; 7:00 pm, MASN2		at George Mason	L 53–68	3–5	EagleBank Arena (3,656); Fairfax, VA
Dec 17, 2019*; 7:00 pm		at Mount St. Mary's	W 82–76	4–5	Knott Arena (1,206); Emmitsburg, MD
Dec 22, 2019*; 2:00 pm, NBCSWA		Stony Brook	L 74–77	4–6	Bender Arena (1,119); Washington, D.C.
Dec 28, 2019*; 12:00 pm, FS1		at Georgetown	L 60–80	4–7	Capital One Arena (7,245); Washington, D.C.
Patriot League regular season
Jan 2, 2020; 7:00 pm		at Colgate	L 51–65	4–8 (0–1)	Cotterell Court (854); Hamilton, NY
Jan 5, 2020; 3:00 pm, Stadium		Boston University	W 67–63	5–8 (1–1)	Bender Arena (291); Washington, D.C.
Jan 8, 2020; 7:00 pm		at Army	W 68–60	6–8 (2–1)	Christl Arena (696); West Point, NY
Jan 11, 2020; 7:00 pm		at Lehigh	W 82–73	6–9 (2–2)	Stabler Arena (743); Bethlehem, PA
Jan 15, 2020; 7:00 pm		Bucknell	W 61–60	7–9 (3–2)	Bender Arena (683); Washington, D.C
Jan 18, 2020; 4:00 pm, NBCSWA		Holy Cross	W 81–69	8–9 (4–2)	Bender Arena (964); Washington, D.C.
Jan 22, 2020; 7:00 pm		at Loyola (MD)	W 93–91	9–9 (5–2)	Reitz Arena (724); Baltimore, MD
Jan 25, 2020; 2:00 pm, NBCSWA		Colgate	L 69–79	9–10 (5–3)	Bender Arena (1,214); Washington, D.C.
Jan 27, 2020; 7:00 pm, CBSSN		Lehigh	W 77–57	10–10 (6–3)	Bender Arena (787); Washington, D.C.
Feb 1, 2020; 7:00 pm		at Lafayette	L 70–82	10–11 (6–4)	Kirby Sports Center (1,000); Easton, PA
Feb 5, 2020; 7:00 pm		at Navy	W 62–54	11–11 (7–4)	Alumni Hall (623); Annapolis, MD
Feb 8, 2020; 2:00 pm		Army	W 72–62	12–11 (8–4)	Bender Arena (1,063); Washington, D.C.
Feb 12, 2020; 7:00 pm		Loyola (MD)	W 81–76	13–11 (9–4)	Bender Arena (716); Washington, D.C.
Feb 15, 2020; 2:00 pm, Stadium		at Bucknell	L 68–72	13–12 (9–5)	Sojka Pavilion (2,785); Lewisburg, PA
Feb 19, 2020; 7:00 pm		Navy	W 71–62	14–12 (10–5)	Bender Arena (846); Washington, D.C.
Feb 23, 2020; 12:00 pm, CBSSN		at Boston University	L 60–64	14–13 (10–6)	Case Gym (934); Boston, MA
Feb 26, 2020; 7:00 pm		Lafayette	W 79–59	15–13 (11–6)	Bender Arena (1,017); Washington, D.C.
Feb 29, 2020; 2:00 pm		at Holy Cross	W 90–47	16–13 (12–6)	Hart Center (1,051); Worcester, MA
Patriot League tournament
Mar 5, 2020; 7:00 pm, PLN	(2)	(7) Bucknell; Quarterfinals	L 59–64	16–14	Bender Arena (1,039); Washington, D.C.
*Non-conference game. ^{#}Rankings from AP poll. (#) Tournament seedings in parentheses. All times are in Eastern Time.
