= 2019–20 Navy Midshipmen men's basketball team =

American college basketball season

2019–20 Navy Midshipmen men's basketball
- Conference: Patriot League
- Record: 14–16 (8–10 Patriot)
- Head coach: Ed DeChellis (9th season)
- Assistant coaches: Emmett Davis; Drew Gibson; Jon Perry; Adam Notteboom
- Home arena: Alumni Hall

2019–20 Patriot League men's basketball standings
	Conf.				Overall
Team	W		L	PCT	W		L	PCT
Colgate	14	–	4	.778	25	–	9	.735
American	12	–	6	.667	16	–	14	.533
Boston University †	12	–	6	.667	21	–	13	.618
Army	10	–	8	.556	15	–	15	.500
Lafayette	10	–	8	.556	19	–	12	.613
Navy	8	–	10	.444	14	–	16	.467
Bucknell	8	–	10	.444	14	–	20	.412
Lehigh	7	–	11	.389	11	–	21	.344
Loyola (MD)	7	–	11	.389	15	–	17	.469
Holy Cross	2	–	16	.111	3	–	29	.094
† 2020 Patriot League tournament winner

The 2019–20 Navy Midshipmen men's basketball team represented the United States Naval Academy during the 2019–20 NCAA Division I men's basketball season. The Midshipmen were led by ninth-year head coach Ed DeChellis, and played their home games at Alumni Hall in Annapolis, Maryland as members of the Patriot League. They finished the season 14–16, 8–10 in Patriot League play to finish in a tie for sixth place. They lost in the first round of the Patriot League tournament to Boston University.

== Previous season ==
The Midshipmen finished the 2019–20 season 12–19, 8–10 in Patriot League play to finish in a tie for fifth place. As the No. 5 seed in the Patriot League tournament, they advanced to the semifinals, where they were defeated by eventual tournament champion Colgate.

== Roster ==
2019–20 Navy Midshipmen men's basketball team
Players
Coaches

Pos.	#	Name	Height	Weight	Year	Previous school	Hometown
G	1	John Carter Jr.	6 ft 3 in (1.91 m)	202 lb (92 kg)	So	Summit High School	Spring Hill, Tennessee
G	2	Nick Brown	6 ft 1 in (1.85 m)	180 lb (82 kg)	Fr	Westchester Country Day School	Jamestown, North Carolina
G	3	Sean Yoder	6 ft 2 in (1.88 m)	190 lb (86 kg)	Fr	Pennridge High School	Dublin, Pennsylvania
F	5	Tyler Nelson	6 ft 6 in (1.98 m)	207 lb (94 kg)	Fr	Metrolina Christian Academy	Monroe, North Carolina
G	10	Christian Jones	6 ft 1 in (1.85 m)	183 lb (83 kg)	Fr	Annapolis High School	Bowie, Maryland
F	11	Jaylen Walker	6 ft 5 in (1.96 m)	206 lb (93 kg)	Fr	Allen High School	Allen, Texas
G	14	Dave Kasanganay	6 ft 2 in (1.88 m)	178 lb (81 kg)	So	Ardrey Kell High School	Charlotte, North Carolina
G	15	P.J. Roach Jr.	6 ft 2 in (1.88 m)	175 lb (79 kg)	Fr	Atlantic Shores Christian School	Virginia Beach, Virginia
G	20	Greg Summers	6 ft 3 in (1.91 m)	195 lb (88 kg)	So	The First Academy	Ocoee, Florida
G	21	Patrick Dorsey	6 ft 5 in (1.96 m)	204 lb (93 kg)	Fr	Millbrook High School	Raleigh, North Carolina
G	22	Cam Davis	6 ft 0 in (1.83 m)	184 lb (83 kg)	Jr	Kickapoo High School	Battlefield, Missouri
F	24	P.J. Fenton	6 ft 7 in (2.01 m)	205 lb (93 kg)	Fr	Green Hope High School	Cary, North Carolina
F	25	Alec Loehr	6 ft 7 in (2.01 m)	223 lb (101 kg)	Jr	Rosemount High School	Inver Grove Heights, Minnesota
G	30	Christian Silva	6 ft 2 in (1.88 m)	197 lb (89 kg)	So	Archbishop Carroll High School	Miami, Florida
F	31	Daniel Deaver	6 ft 8 in (2.03 m)	235 lb (107 kg)	Fr	Marshall High School	Falls Church, Virginia
F	33	Luke Loehr	6 ft 7 in (2.01 m)	221 lb (100 kg)	Jr	Rosemount High School	Inver Grove Heights, Minnesota
F	35	Nate Allison	6 ft 7 in (2.01 m)	215 lb (98 kg)	Fr	Starr's Mill High School	Fayetteville, Georgia
C	40	Evan Wieck	6 ft 8 in (2.03 m)	240 lb (109 kg)	Sr	Amarillo High School	Amarillo, Texas
C	42	Zach Kelch	6 ft 8 in (2.03 m)	225 lb (102 kg)	Fr	Simon Kenton High School	Walton, Kentucky
F	55	Richard Njoku	6 ft 7 in (2.01 m)	235 lb (107 kg)	So	St. John's College High School	Washington, D.C.

Head coach

- Ed DeChellis (Penn State)

Assistant coach(es)

- Emmett Davis (St. Lawrence)
- Drew Gibson (Wofford)
- Adam Notteboom (Xavier)
- Jon Perry (East Tennessee State)

Legend

- (C) Team captain
- (S) Suspended
- (I) Ineligible
- (W) Walk-on
- Injured
- Current redshirt

Roster
Last update: January 8, 2020

== Schedule and results ==
Date time, TV	Rank^{#}	Opponent^{#}	Result	Record	Site (attendance) city, state
Non-conference regular season
Nov 5, 2019*; 7:00 pm, ESPN+		at George Mason	L 55–68 ^{OT}	0–1	EagleBank Arena (5,620); Fairfax, VA
Nov 8, 2018*; 8:30 pm, CBSSN		East Carolina; Veterans Classic	W 62–57	1–1	Alumni Hall (4,549); Annapolis, MD
Nov 10, 2019*; 4:00 pm		Washington (MD)	W 87–56	2–1	Alumni Hall (719); Annapolis, MD
Nov 19, 2019*; 7:00 pm, ESPN+		at Liberty	L 48–55	2–2	Vines Center (4,010); Lynchburg, VA
Nov 22, 2019*; 7:00 pm		Lipscomb	L 61–65	2–3	Alumni Hall (763); Annapolis, MD
Nov 26, 2019*; 7:00 pm		Cornell	W 72–61	3–3	Alumni Hall (804); Annapolis, MD
Nov 30, 2019*; 1:00 pm, NESN		at Brown	W 76–56	4–3	Pizzitola Sports Center (743); Providence, RI
Dec 2, 2019*; 7:30 pm		at Bryant	L 45–60	4–4	Chace Athletic Center (604); Smithfield, RI
Dec 7, 2019*; 7:00 pm		Marist	W 53–51 ^{OT}	5–4	Alumni Hall (849); Annapolis, MD
Dec 20, 2019*; 1:00 pm		Mount St. Mary's	W 59–48	6–4	Alumni Hall (921); Annapolis, MD
Dec 29, 2019*; 4:00 pm, ESPN2		at No. 16 Virginia	L 56–65	6–5	John Paul Jones Arena (14,399); Charlottesville, VA
Patriot League regular season
Jan 2, 2020; 7:00 pm		Lehigh	W 64–58	7–5 (1–0)	Alumni Hall (703); Annapolis, MD
Jan 5, 2020; 12:00 pm, NESN		at Holy Cross	L 61–63	7–6 (1–1)	Hart Center (1,218); Worcester, MA
Jan 8, 2020; 7:00 pm		at Bucknell	W 60–56	8–6 (2–1)	Sojka Pavilion (2,338); Lewisburg, PA
Jan 11, 2020; 4:00 pm		Colgate	L 63–70	8–7 (2–2)	Alumni Hall (1,516); Annapolis, MD
Jan 15, 2020; 7:00 pm, Stadium		at Lehigh	W 88–83	9–7 (3–2)	Stabler Arena (1,004); Bethlehem, PA
Jan 18, 2020; 4:00 pm		Lafayette	W 68–66	10–7 (4–2)	Alumni Hall (1,684); Annapolis, MD
Jan 22, 2020; 7:00 pm, NESN		Boston University	W 60–58 ^{OT}	11–7 (5–2)	Case Gym (1,153); Boston, MA
Jan 25, 2020; 1:30 pm, CBSSN		Army	L 66–73	11–8 (5–3)	Alumni Hall (5,316); Annapolis, MD
Jan 29, 2020; 7:00 pm, Stadium		Holy Cross	W 81–66	12–8 (6–3)	Alumni Hall (766); Annapolis, MD
Feb 1, 2020; 5:00 pm		at Loyola (MD)	L 73–79	12–9 (6–4)	Reitz Arena (1,024); Baltimore, MD
Feb 5, 2020; 7:00 pm		American	L 54–62	12–10 (6–5)	Alumni Hall (623); Annapolis, MD
Feb 8, 2020; 2:00 pm, Stadium		at Colgate	W 67–60	12–11 (6–6)	Cotterell Court (1,026); Hamilton, NY
Feb 12, 2020; 7:00 pm		Bucknell	W 60–59	13–11 (7–6)	Alumni Hall (660); Annapolis, MD
Feb 15, 2020; 4:00 pm		Boston University	L 54–77	13–12 (7–7)	Alumni Hall (1,738); Annapolis, MD
Feb 19, 2020; 7:00 pm		at American	L 62–71	13–13 (7–8)	Bender Arena (846); Washington, D.C.
Feb 22, 2020; 1:30 pm, CBSSN		at Army	L 75–86 ^{OT}	13–14 (7–9)	Christl Arena (4,636); West Point, NY
Feb 26, 2020; 7:00 pm		Loyola (MD)	W 62–57	14–14 (8–9)	Alumni Hall (1,446); Annapolis, MD
Feb 29, 2020; 2:00 pm		at Lafayette	L 60–62	14–15 (8–10)	Kirby Sports Center (2,186); Easton, PA
Patriot League tournament
Mar 5, 2020; 7:00 pm, PLN	(6)	at (3) Boston University; Quarterfinals	L 63–69	14–16	Case Gym (517); Boston, MA
*Non-conference game. ^{#}Rankings from AP Poll. (#) Tournament seedings in parentheses. All times are in Eastern Time.
