= 2019–20 Lafayette Leopards men's basketball team =

American college basketball season

2019–20 Lafayette Leopards men's basketball
- Conference: Patriot League
- Record: 19–12 (10–8 Patriot)
- Head coach: Fran O'Hanlon (25th season)
- Assistant coaches: Andrew Radomicki; Jarren Dyson; Justin Burrell
- Home arena: Kirby Sports Center

2019–20 Patriot League men's basketball standings
	Conf.				Overall
Team	W		L	PCT	W		L	PCT
Colgate	14	–	4	.778	25	–	9	.735
American	12	–	6	.667	16	–	14	.533
Boston University †	12	–	6	.667	21	–	13	.618
Army	10	–	8	.556	15	–	15	.500
Lafayette	10	–	8	.556	19	–	12	.613
Navy	8	–	10	.444	14	–	16	.467
Bucknell	8	–	10	.444	14	–	20	.412
Lehigh	7	–	11	.389	11	–	21	.344
Loyola (MD)	7	–	11	.389	15	–	17	.469
Holy Cross	2	–	16	.111	3	–	29	.094
† 2020 Patriot League tournament winner

The 2019–20 Lafayette Leopards men's basketball team represented Lafayette College during the 2019–20 NCAA Division I men's basketball season. The Leopards, led by 25th-year head coach Fran O'Hanlon, played their home games at the Kirby Sports Center in Easton, Pennsylvania as members of the Patriot League. They finished the season 19–12, 10–8 in Patriot League play to finish in a tie for fourth place. They defeated Army in the quarterfinals of the Patriot League tournament before losing in the semifinals to Colgate.

== Roster ==
2019–20 Lafayette Leopards men's basketball team
Players
Coaches

Pos.	#	Name	Height	Weight	Year	Previous school	Hometown
G	3	Tyrone Perry	6 ft 1 in (1.85 m)	165 lb (75 kg)	So	Wekiva HS	Apopka, FL
G	4	Jay Vaughan	5 ft 11 in (1.8 m)	166 lb (75 kg)	So	Allentown Central Catholic HS	Allentown, PA
G	11	Justin Jaworski	6 ft 2 in (1.88 m)	194 lb (88 kg)	Jr	Perkiomen Valley HS	Schwenksville, PA
F	13	Sean Good	6 ft 10 in (2.08 m)	200 lb (91 kg)	So	Trinity HS	Camp Hill, PA
G	14	Cal Reichwein	6 ft 3 in (1.91 m)	217 lb (98 kg)	Sr	Central Bucks West HS	Doylestown, PA
G	20	E.J. Stephens	6 ft 1 in (1.85 m)	173 lb (78 kg)	Jr	St. Thomas Aquinas HS	Plantation, FL
G	21	Alex Petrie	6 ft 2 in (1.88 m)	185 lb (84 kg)	Jr	St. Christopher's School	Midlothian, VA
F	23	Lukas Jarrett	6 ft 8 in (2.03 m)	207 lb (94 kg)	Sr	Northport HS	Northport, NY
G	24	Kyle Stout	6 ft 6 in (1.98 m)	205 lb (93 kg)	Sr	Parkland HS	Schnecksville, PA
F	32	Michael Anekwe	6 ft 6 in (1.98 m)	222 lb (101 kg)	So	Besant Hill School	Lagos, Nigeria
F	33	Leo O'Boyle	6 ft 7 in (2.01 m)	203 lb (92 kg)	Fr	Scranton Prep	Scranton, PA
F	44	Dylan Hastings	6 ft 8 in (2.03 m)	227 lb (103 kg)	Jr	Solanco HS	Quarryville, PA
F	45	Neal Quinn	7 ft 0 in (2.13 m)	265 lb (120 kg)	Fr	Ramapo HS	Wyckoff, NJ
F	54	Myles Cherry	6 ft 8 in (2.03 m)	247 lb (112 kg)	Sr	Choate Rosemary Hall	Newcastle, Australia

Head coach

- Fran O'Hanlon (Villanova)

Assistant coach(es)

- Jarren Dyson (Emory & Henry)
- Justin Purrell (Holy Cross)
- Andrew Radomicki (Widener)

Legend

- (C) Team captain
- (S) Suspended
- (I) Ineligible
- (W) Walk-on
- Injured
- Current redshirt

Roster
Last update: January 4, 2020

== Schedule and results ==
Date time, TV	Rank^{#}	Opponent^{#}	Result	Record	Site (attendance) city, state
Non-conference regular season
Nov 5, 2019*; 8:00 pm		Columbia	W 65–63	1–0	Kirby Sports Center (1,476); Easton, PA
Nov 9, 2019*; 2:00 pm		at St. Francis Brooklyn	L 72–73	1–1	Generoso Pope Athletic Complex (528); Brooklyn, NY
Nov 13, 2019*; 7:00 pm, ESPN+		at Princeton	W 72–65	2–1	Jadwin Gymnasium (1,298); Princeton, NJ
Nov 16, 2019*; 5:00 pm		Delaware	L 73–81	2–2	Kirby Sports Center (1,233); Easton, PA
Nov 19, 2019*; 7:00 pm		Penn	W 86–75	3–2	Kirby Sports Center (1,366); Easton, PA
Nov 24, 2019*; 1:00 pm		Fairleigh Dickinson	W 80–75	4–2	Kirby Sports Center (1,000); Easton, PA
Dec 3, 2019*; 7:00 pm, ESPN+		at Saint Joseph's	W 94–71	5–2	Hagan Arena (2,011); Philadelphia, PA
Dec 7, 2019*; 1:00 pm, ESPN+		at Cornell	W 62–59	6–2	Newman Arena (994); Ithaca, NY
Dec 19, 2019*; 7:00 pm		Widener	W 96–56	7–2	Kirby Sports Center (641); Easton, PA
Dec 22, 2019*; 1:00 pm, ESPNU		at Rutgers	L 44–63	7–3	Louis Brown Athletic Center (5,692); Piscataway, NJ
Dec 29, 2019*; 2:00 pm		at Sacred Heart	W 67–66	8–3	William H. Pitt Center (357); Fairfield, CT
Patriot League regular season
Jan 2, 2020; 7:00 pm		at Boston University	L 72–73	8–4 (0–1)	Case Gym (456); Boston, MA
Jan 5, 2020; 2:00 pm		Bucknell	L 66–78	8–5 (0–2)	Kirby Sports Center (1,502); Easton, PA
Jan 8, 2020; 7:00 pm		Holy Cross	W 82–64	9–5 (1–2)	Kirby Sports Center (1,275); Easton, PA
Jan 11, 2020; 5:00 pm		at Loyola (MD)	W 65–62	19–5 (2–2)	Reitz Arena (474); Baltimore, MD
Jan 15, 2020; 11:00 am		Colgate	W 71–67	11–5 (3–2)	Kirby Sports Center (2,544); Easton, PA
Jan 18, 2020; 4:00 pm		at Navy	L 66–68	11–6 (3–3)	Alumni Hall (1,684); Annapolis, MD
Jan 22, 2020; 7:00 pm		Army	L 74–94	11–7 (3–4)	Kirby Sports Center (1,447); Easton, PA
Jan 25, 2020; 12:00 pm		at Lehigh	W 74–56	12–7 (4–4)	Stabler Arena (1,248); Bethlehem, PA
Jan 29, 2020; 7:00 pm		at Colgate	W 80–78	13–7 (5–4)	Cotterell Court (930); Hamilton, NY
Feb 1, 2020; 2:00 pm		American	W 82–70	14–7 (6–4)	Kirby Sports Center (1,000); Easton, PA
Feb 3, 2020; 7:00 pm, CBSSN		at Bucknell	W 65–62	15–7 (7–4)	Sojka Pavilion (2,011); Lewisburg, PA
Feb 8, 2020; 2:00 pm		Lehigh	L 59–62	15–8 (7–5)	Kirby Sports Center (2,453); Easton, PA
Feb 12, 2020; 7:00 pm, Stadium		at Army	L 48–65	15–9 (7–6)	Christl Arena (428); West Point, NY
Feb 15, 2020; 2:00 pm		at Holy Cross	W 72–62	16–9 (8–6)	Hart Center (1,401); Worcester, MA
Feb 19, 2020; 7:00 pm		Boston University	W 61–59	17–9 (9–6)	Kirby Sports Center (1,776); Easton, PA
Feb 23, 2020; 2:00 pm		Loyola (MD)	L 68–70	17–10 (9–7)	Kirby Sports Center (1,481); Easton, PA
Feb 26, 2020; 7:00 pm		at American	L 59–79	17–11 (9–8)	Bender Arena (1,017); Washington, D.C.
Feb 29, 2020; 2:00 pm		Navy	W 62–60	18–11 (10–8)	Kirby Sports Center (2,186); Easton, PA
Patriot League tournament
Mar 5, 2020; 7:00 pm, PLN	(5)	at (4) Army; Quarterfinals	W 73–68	19–11	Christl Arena (334); West Point, NY
Mar 8, 2020; 12:00 pm, CBSSN	(5)	at (1) Colgate; Semifinals	L 64–89	19–12	Cotterell Court (1,834); Hamilton, NY
*Non-conference game. ^{#}Rankings from AP Poll. (#) Tournament seedings in parentheses. All times are in Eastern Time.
