= 2020 Patriot League men's basketball tournament =

- Classification: Division I
- Season: 2019–20
- Teams: 10
- Site: Campus sites
- Champions: Boston University (1st title)
- Winning coach: Joe Jones (1st title)
- MVP: Max Mahoney (Boston University)
- Television: PLN, CBSSN

2019–20 Patriot League men's basketball standings
	Conf.				Overall
Team	W		L	PCT	W		L	PCT
Colgate	14	–	4	.778	25	–	9	.735
American	12	–	6	.667	16	–	14	.533
Boston University †	12	–	6	.667	21	–	13	.618
Army	10	–	8	.556	15	–	15	.500
Lafayette	10	–	8	.556	19	–	12	.613
Navy	8	–	10	.444	14	–	16	.467
Bucknell	8	–	10	.444	14	–	20	.412
Lehigh	7	–	11	.389	11	–	21	.344
Loyola (MD)	7	–	11	.389	15	–	17	.469
Holy Cross	2	–	16	.111	3	–	29	.094
† 2020 Patriot League tournament winner

The 2020 Patriot League men's basketball tournament was the postseason tournament for the Patriot League during the 2019–20 NCAA Division I men's basketball season. It was held on March 3, 5, 8, and 11, with the higher seed in each match up hosting at their respective campus sites. No. 3 seed Boston University defeated Colgate 64–61 in the championship game to win the conference tournament championship and the conference's automatic bid to the 2020 NCAA Division I men's basketball tournament. The NCAA Tournament would be subsequently canceled in order to mitigate the spread of COVID-19. The Patriot League was the final conference to hold its championship game before all others remaining were cancelled due to the COVID-19 pandemic.

The Patriot League Tournament Championship was Boston University's first since joining the conference in 2013.

== Seeds ==
All 10 Patriot League teams are eligible for the tournament. The top six teams receive a first round bye. Teams are seeded by record within the conference, with a tiebreaker system to seed teams with identical conference records.

Seed	School	Conf	Tiebreaker 1	Tiebreaker 2	Tiebreaker 3	Tiebreaker 4	Tiebreaker 5
1	Colgate	14–4					
2	American	12–6	1–1 vs. Boston University	0–2 vs. Colgate	2–0 vs. Army	1–1 vs. Lafayette	2–0 vs. Navy
3	Boston University	12–6	1–1 vs. American	0–2 vs. Colgate	2–0 vs. Army	1–1 vs. Lafayette	1–1 vs. Navy
4	Army	10–8	2–0 vs. Lafayette				
5	Lafayette	10–8	0–2 vs. Army				
6	Navy	8–10	2–0 vs. Bucknell				
7	Bucknell	8–10	0–2 vs. Navy				
8	Lehigh	7–11	2–0 vs. Loyola (MD)				
9	Loyola (MD)	7–11	0–2 vs. Lehigh				
10	Holy Cross	2–16					

== Schedule ==
Game	Time*	Matchup	Score	Attendance	Television
First round – Tuesday, March 3
1	7:00 pm	No. 9 Loyola (MD) at No. 8 Lehigh	75–78	716	PLN
2	7:00 pm	No. 10 Holy Cross at No. 7 Bucknell	62–65	1,507	PLN
Quarterfinals – Thursday, March 5
3	7:00 pm	No. 8 Lehigh at No. 1 Colgate	70–83	1,368	PLN
4	7:00 pm	No. 5 Lafayette at No. 4 Army	73–68	334	PLN
5	7:00 pm	No. 6 Navy at No. 3 Boston University	63–69	517	PLN
6	7:00 pm	No. 7 Bucknell at No. 2 American	64–59	1,039	PLN
Semifinals – Sunday, March 8
7	12:00 pm	No. 5 Lafayette at No. 1 Colgate	65–88	1,834	CBSSN
8	2:00 pm	No. 7 Bucknell at No. 3 Boston University	61–64	1,334	CBSSN
Championship – Wednesday, March 11
9	7:30 pm	No. 3 Boston University at No. 1 Colgate	64–61	1,724	CBSSN
*Game times in ET. Rankings denote tournament seeding. All games hosted by higher-seeded team.

== Bracket ==
First round March 3 Patriot League Network
8	Lehigh	78
9	Loyola (MD)	75
7	Bucknell	65
10	Holy Cross	62

Quarterfinals; March 5 Patriot League Network
1	Colgate	83
8	Lehigh	70
4	Army	68
5	Lafayette	73
2	American	59
7	Bucknell	64
3	Boston University	69
6	Navy	63

Semifinals; March 8 CBS Sports Network
1	Colgate	88
5	Lafayette	65
7	Bucknell	61
3	Boston University	64

Championship; March 11; CBS Sports Network
1	Colgate	61
3	Boston University	64
