= 2019–20 Holy Cross Crusaders men's basketball team =

American college basketball season

2019–20 Holy Cross Crusaders men's basketball
- Conference: Patriot League
- Record: 3–29 (2–16 Patriot)
- Head coach: Brett Nelson (1st season)
- Assistant coaches: Joe Kennedy; R.J. Evans; Sam Ferry
- Home arena: Hart Center

2019–20 Patriot League men's basketball standings
	Conf.				Overall
Team	W		L	PCT	W		L	PCT
Colgate	14	–	4	.778	25	–	9	.735
American	12	–	6	.667	16	–	14	.533
Boston University †	12	–	6	.667	21	–	13	.618
Army	10	–	8	.556	15	–	15	.500
Lafayette	10	–	8	.556	19	–	12	.613
Navy	8	–	10	.444	14	–	16	.467
Bucknell	8	–	10	.444	14	–	20	.412
Lehigh	7	–	11	.389	11	–	21	.344
Loyola (MD)	7	–	11	.389	15	–	17	.469
Holy Cross	2	–	16	.111	3	–	29	.094
† 2020 Patriot League tournament winner

The 2019–20 Holy Cross Crusaders men's basketball team represented the College of the Holy Cross during the 2019–20 NCAA Division I men's basketball season. The Crusaders, led by first-year head coach Brett Nelson, played their home games at the Hart Center in Worcester, Massachusetts as members of the Patriot League. They finished the season 3–29, 2–16 in Patriot League play to finish in last place. They lost in the first round of the Patriot League tournament to Bucknell.

== Previous season ==
The Crusaders finished the 2018–19 season 16–17, 6–12 in Patriot League play to finish in last place. They defeated Lafayette in the first round of the Patriot League tournament before losing to Bucknell in the quarterfinals.

Following the season, head coach Bill Carmody announced his retirement. On July 3, 2019, the school named Marquette assistant Brett Nelson as Carmody's replacement.

== Roster ==
2019–20 Holy Cross Crusaders men's basketball team
Players
Coaches

Pos.	#	Name	Height	Weight	Year	Previous school	Hometown
G	0	Ryan Wade	6 ft 2 in (1.88 m)	170 lb (77 kg)	Fr	Skyline	Ann Arbor, Michigan
G	2	Kyle Copeland	6 ft 4 in (1.93 m)	175 lb (79 kg)	Jr	Phillips Exeter Academy	Leesburg, Virginia
G	3	Drew Lowder	6 ft 0 in (1.83 m)	170 lb (77 kg)	Fr	Pioneer	Jackson, Michigan
G	4	Austin Butler	6 ft 5 in (1.96 m)	212 lb (96 kg)	Jr	Greater Latrobe Senior	Latrobe, Pennsylvania
F	5	Connor Niego	6 ft 8 in (2.03 m)	212 lb (96 kg)	Jr	Lyons Township	Western Springs, Illinois
F	10	Ciaran Sandy	6 ft 7 in (2.01 m)	195 lb (88 kg)	Fr	Avon Old Farms	London, England
G	11	Joey Reilly	6 ft 0 in (1.83 m)	170 lb (77 kg)	Fr	East Catholic	Cromwell, Connecticut
G	12	Clayton Le Sann	6 ft 4 in (1.93 m)	184 lb (83 kg)	Sr	Cheshire Academy	Geneva, Switzerland
F	13	Marlon Hargis	6 ft 7 in (2.01 m)	203 lb (92 kg)	So	St. Augustine Prep	Mays Landing, New Jersey
F	15	Matt Faw	6 ft 9 in (2.06 m)	223 lb (101 kg)	Jr	Upper Merion Area	King of Prussia, Pennsylvania
G	21	Lincoln Yeutter	6 ft 2 in (1.88 m)	188 lb (85 kg)	So	Bullis	Chevy Chase, Maryland
F	23	Joe Pridgen	6 ft 5 in (1.96 m)	210 lb (95 kg)	Fr	Governor's Academy	Winchendon, Massachusetts
F	24	D.J. Hart	6 ft 5 in (1.96 m)	232 lb (105 kg)	So	St. Benedict's Prep	Newark, New Jersey
F	42	Blake Verbeek	6 ft 11 in (2.11 m)	215 lb (98 kg)	So	Calvin Christian	Grand Rapids, Michigan

Head coach

- Brett Nelson (Florida)

Assistant coach(es)

- R.J. Evans (Connecticut)
- Sam Ferry (Vanderbilt)
- Joe Kennedy (Northwestern)

Legend

- (C) Team captain
- (S) Suspended
- (I) Ineligible
- (W) Walk-on
- Injured
- Current redshirt

Roster
Last update: January 11, 2020

== Schedule and results ==
Date time, TV	Rank^{#}	Opponent^{#}	Result	Record	Site (attendance) city, state
Non-conference regular season
Nov 5, 2019*; 7:30 pm, BTN Plus		at No. 7 Maryland	L 71–95	0–1	Xfinity Center (13,633); College Park, MD
Nov 9, 2019*; 1:00 pm, ESPN3		at New Hampshire	L 83–87	0–2	Lundholm Gym (501); Durham, NH
Nov 12, 2019*; 7:00 pm, PLN		Fairfield	L 61–70 ^{OT}	0–3	Hart Center (1,712); Worcester, MA
Nov 19, 2019*; 7:00 pm, PLN		Northeastern	L 44–101	0–4	Hart Center (1,432); Worcester, MA
Nov 22, 2019*; 11:00 am, PLN		Harvard	L 74–82	0–5	Hart Center (1,972); Worcester, MA
Nov 29, 2019*; 7:00 pm		vs. Florida Atlantic; Boca Raton Beach Classic	L 69–87	0–6	FAU Arena (1,036); Boca Raton, FL
Dec 1, 2019*; 3:00 pm		vs. Hofstra; Boca Raton Beach Classic	L 69–91	0–7	FAU Arena (1,114); Boca Raton, FL
Dec 2, 2019*; 11:00 am		vs. Mercer; Boca Raton Beach Classic	W 81–67	1–7	FAU Arena (1,122); Boca Raton, FL
Dec 7, 2019*; 10:00 pm, WCC Network		at San Diego	L 51–68	1–8	Jenny Craig Pavilion (1,025); San Diego, CA
Dec 10, 2019*; 7:00 pm		Massachusetts Boston	L 66–69 ^{OT}	1–9	Hart Center (1,035); Worcester, MA
Dec 14, 2019*; 2:00 pm		at Canisius	L 72–80	1–10	Koessler Athletic Center (896); Buffalo, NY
Dec 22, 2019; 12:00 pm, NESN		Sacred Heart	L 68–89	1–11	Hart Center (1,013); Worcester, MA
Dec 29, 2019*; 2:00 pm, ESPN+		at Siena	L 62–74	1–12	Times Union Center (6,202); Albany, NY
Patriot League regular season
Jan 2, 2020; 7:00 pm, Stadium		at Loyola (MD)	L 70–80	1–13 (0–1)	Reitz Arena (420); Baltimore, MD
Jan 5, 2020; 12:05 pm, NESN		Navy	W 63–61	2–13 (1–1)	Hart Center (1,218); Worcester, MA
Jan 8, 2020; 7:00 pm		at Lafayette	L 64–82	2–14 (1–2)	Kirby Sports Center (1,276); Easton, PA
Jan 11, 2020; 2:00 pm, PLN		at Bucknell	L 60–75	2–15 (1–3)	Sojka Pavilion (2,575); Lewisburg, PA
Jan 16, 2020 (Note: Originally scheduled on January 15, 2020 at 7:00 pm.); 2:00 pm, PLN		Army	L 67–79	2–16 (1–4)	Hart Center (1,047); Worcester, MA
Jan 18, 2020; 4:00 pm, NBCSWA		at American	L 69–81	2–17 (1–5)	Bender Arena (964); Washington, D.C.
Jan 22, 2020; 7:00 pm, PLN		Lehigh	W 96–95 ^{OT}	3–17 (2–5)	Hart Center (1,028); Worcester, MA
Jan 25, 2020; 2:00 pm, NESN		Boston University; Turnpike Trophy	L 64–79	3–18 (2–6)	Hart Center (2,063); Worcester, MA
Jan 29, 2020; 7:00 pm, Stadium		at Navy	L 66-81	3–19 (2–7)	Alumni Hall (766); Annapolis, MD
Feb 1, 2020; 2:00 pm, CBSSN		Colgate	L 64–73	3–20 (2–8)	Hart Center (1,629); Worcester, MA
Feb 5, 2020; 7:00 pm, NESN Plus		Loyola (MD)	L 60–74	3–21 (2–9)	Hart Center (1,085); Worcester, MA
Feb 8, 2020; 1:00 pm		at Boston University; Turnpike Trophy	L 68–77	3–22 (2–10)	Case Gym (845); Boston, MA
Feb 12, 2020; 7:00 pm		at Lehigh	L 82–89	3–23 (2–11)	Stabler Arena (752); Bethlehem, PA
Feb 15, 2020; 2:00 pm, Spectrum News 1		Lafayette	L 62–72	3–24 (2–12)	Hart Center (1,401); Worcester, MA
Feb 17, 2020; 7:00 pm, CBSSN		Bucknell	L 48–69	3–25 (2–13)	Hart Center (1,333); Worcester, MA
Feb 23, 2020; 2:00 pm		at Colgate	L 60–90	3–26 (2–14)	Cotterell Court (985); Hamilton, NY
Feb 26, 2020; 7:00 pm		at Army	L 61–67	3–27 (2–15)	Christl Arena (817); West Point, NY
Feb 29, 2020; 2:00 pm		American	L 47–90	3–38 (2–16)	Hart Center (1,051); Worcester, MA
Patriot League tournament
Mar 3, 2020; 7:00 pm, PLN	(10)	at (7) Bucknell; First round	L 62–65	3–29	Sojka Pavilion (1,507); Lewisburg, PA
*Non-conference game. ^{#}Rankings from AP Poll. (#) Tournament seedings in parentheses. All times are in Eastern Time.
