= 2019–20 Loyola Greyhounds men's basketball team =

American college basketball season

2019–20 Loyola Greyhounds men's basketball
- Conference: Patriot League
- Record: 15–17 (7–11 Patriot)
- Head coach: Tavaras Hardy (2nd season)
- Assistant coaches: Freddie Owens; Ivo Simović; Taj Finger
- Home arena: Reitz Arena

2019–20 Patriot League men's basketball standings
	Conf.				Overall
Team	W		L	PCT	W		L	PCT
Colgate	14	–	4	.778	25	–	9	.735
American	12	–	6	.667	16	–	14	.533
Boston University †	12	–	6	.667	21	–	13	.618
Army	10	–	8	.556	15	–	15	.500
Lafayette	10	–	8	.556	19	–	12	.613
Navy	8	–	10	.444	14	–	16	.467
Bucknell	8	–	10	.444	14	–	20	.412
Lehigh	7	–	11	.389	11	–	21	.344
Loyola (MD)	7	–	11	.389	15	–	17	.469
Holy Cross	2	–	16	.111	3	–	29	.094
† 2020 Patriot League tournament winner

The 2019–20 Loyola Greyhounds men's basketball team represented Loyola University Maryland during the 2019–20 NCAA Division I men's basketball season. The Greyhounds, led by second-year head coach Tavaras Hardy, played their home games at Reitz Arena in Baltimore, Maryland as members of the Patriot League. They finished the season 15–17, 7–11 in Patriot League play to finish in a tie for eighth place. They lost in the first round of the Patriot League tournament to Lehigh.

== Roster ==
2019–20 Loyola Greyhounds men's basketball team
Players
Coaches

Pos.	#	Name	Height	Weight	Year	Previous school	Hometown
F	0	Golden Dike	6 ft 10 in (2.08 m)	250 lb (113 kg)	Fr	Colegio SEK El Castillo International School	Málaga, Spain
F	1	KaVaughn Scott	6 ft 7 in (2.01 m)	220 lb (100 kg)	Sr	Orange Lutheran High School	Irvine, California
G	2	Jaylin Andrews	6 ft 4 in (1.93 m)	179 lb (81 kg)	So	Boys' Latin School of Maryland	Owings Mills, Maryland
G	3	Luke Johnson	6 ft 3 in (1.91 m)	180 lb (82 kg)	Jr	Lexington Catholic High School	Lexington, Kentucky
G	4	Isaiah Hart	5 ft 11 in (1.8 m)	185 lb (84 kg)	Jr	Whitefield Academy	Morrow, Georgia
G	5	Garren Davis	6 ft 4 in (1.93 m)	200 lb (91 kg)	Fr	The Colony High School	Dallas, Texas
G	10	Andrew Kostecka III	6 ft 4 in (1.93 m)	189 lb (86 kg)	Sr	Clarksburg High School	Germantown, Maryland
G	11	Brandon Bradsher	5 ft 10 in (1.78 m)	178 lb (81 kg)	Jr	Boys' Latin School of Maryland	Ellicott City, Maryland
G	12	Cam Spencer	6 ft 4 in (1.93 m)	205 lb (93 kg)	Fr	Boys' Latin School of Maryland	Davidsonville, Maryland
F	13	Markese Redding (W)	6 ft 6 in (1.98 m)	200 lb (91 kg)	So	Little Red School House	Brooklyn, New York
G	14	Chuck Champion	6 ft 4 in (1.93 m)	185 lb (84 kg)	Sr	Friends' Central School	Philadelphia, Pennsylvania
G	21	Ethan Norton (W)	6 ft 4 in (1.93 m)	162 lb (73 kg)	Jr	The Hill School	Collegeville, Pennsylvania
F	22	Casmir Ochiaka	6 ft 8 in (2.03 m)	235 lb (107 kg)	So	St. Mary of the Assumption High School	Enugu, Nigeria
F	23	Brent Holcombe	6 ft 8 in (2.03 m)	204 lb (93 kg)	Jr	Coral Reef High School	Miami, Florida
G	24	Daraun Gray	5 ft 11 in (1.8 m)	162 lb (73 kg)	Fr	Landon School	Clarksburg, Maryland
G	25	Kenneth Jones	6 ft 0 in (1.83 m)	177 lb (80 kg)	So	Mater Dei Prep	Hillside, New Jersey
F	34	Santi Aldama	6 ft 11 in (2.11 m)	215 lb (98 kg)	Fr	Canterbury Academy	Las Palmas de Gran Canaria, Spain

Head coach

- Tavaras Hardy (Northwestern)

Assistant coach(es)

- Ivo Simović (Union (Serbia))
- Freddie Owens (Wisconsin)
- Taj Finger (Stanford)

Legend

- (C) Team captain
- (S) Suspended
- (I) Ineligible
- (W) Walk-on
- Injured
- Current redshirt

Roster
Last update: January 8, 2020

== Schedule and results ==
Date time, TV	Rank^{#}	Opponent^{#}	Result	Record	Site (attendance) city, state
Exhibition
Nov 1, 2019*; 7:00 pm		Johns Hopkins	W 80–77		Reitz Arena; Baltimore, MD
Non-conference regular season
Nov 5, 2019*; 8:00 pm, FCS		at Marquette	L 53–88	0–1	Fiserv Forum (13,103); Milwaukee, WI
Nov 9, 2019*; 3:00 pm		at Chicago State	W 98–85	1–1	Emil and Patricia Jones Convocation Center (603); Chicago, IL
Nov 13, 2019*; 7:00 pm		at Old Dominion; Cayman Islands Classic campus-site game	L 53–62	1–2	Chartway Arena (5,863); Norfolk, VA
Nov 17, 2019*; 6:00 pm		Fairfield	W 84–75 ^{OT}	2–2	Reitz Arena (1,241); Baltimore, MD
Nov 19, 2019*; 7:00 pm, ESPN+		at George Mason; Cayman Islands Classic campus-site game	L 61–65	2–3	EagleBank Arena (2,445); Fairfax, VA
Nov 25, 2019*; 5:30 pm		vs. IUPUI; Cayman Islands Classic Mainland Tournament at Omaha	W 81–77	3–3	Baxter Arena (269); Omaha, NE
Nov 26, 2019*; 7:00 pm		vs. Omaha; Cayman Islands Classic Mainland Tournament at Omaha	L 65–70	3–4	Baxter Arena (1,806); Omaha, NE
Dec 1, 2019*; 6:00 pm		Binghamton	W 77–65	4–4	Reitz Arena (426); Baltimore, MD
Dec 4, 2019*; 7:00 pm		at Delaware State	W 84–76	5–4	Memorial Hall (813); Dover, DE
Dec 7, 2019*; 4:00 pm		at Mount St. Mary's	W 64–48	6–4	Knott Arena (1,811); Emmitsburg, MD
Dec 21, 2019*; 2:00 pm		Elizabethtown	W 72–45	7–4	Reitz Arena (342); Baltimore, MD
Dec 27, 2019*; 7:00 pm		UMass Lowell	W 93–81	8–4	Reitz Arena (544); Baltimore, MD
Dec 29, 2019*; 5:00 pm, MASN		at VCU	L 51–85	8–5	Siegel Center (7,637); Richmond, VA
Patriot League regular season
Jan 2, 2020; 7:00 pm, Stadium		Holy Cross	W 80–70	9–5 (1–0)	Reitz Arena (420); Baltimore, MD
Jan 5, 2020; 2:00 pm		at Lehigh	L 71–78	9–6 (1–1)	Stabler Arena (801); Bethlehem, PA
Jan 8, 2020; 7:00 pm		at Colgate	L 70–92	9–7 (1–2)	Cotterell Court (710); Hamilton, NY
Jan 11, 2020; 1:00 pm		Lafayette	L 62–65	9–8 (1–3)	Reitz Arena (474); Baltimore, MD
Jan 13, 2020; 7:00 pm, CBSSN		Boston University	L 53–85	9–9 (1–4)	Reitz Arena (1,109); Baltimore, MD
Jan 18, 2020; 1:00 pm		at Army	L 80–81	9–10 (1–5)	Christl Arena (1,595); West Point, NY
Jan 22, 2020; 7:00 pm		American	L 91–93 ^{OT}	9–11 (1–6)	Reitz Arena (724); Baltimore, MD
Jan 25, 2020; 7:00 pm, Stadium		at Bucknell	L 83–98	9–12 (1–7)	Sojka Pavilion (2,588); Lewisburg, PA
Jan 29, 2020; 7:00 pm		at Boston University	L 77–92	9–13 (1–8)	Case Gym (742); Boston, MA
Feb 1, 2020; 5:00 pm		Navy	W 79–73	10–13 (2–8)	Reitz Arena (1,024); Baltimore, MD
Feb 5, 2020; 7:00 pm		at Holy Cross	W 74–60	11–13 (3–8)	Hart Center (1,085); Worcester, MA
Feb 8, 2020; 5:00 pm		Bucknell	W 78–65	12–13 (4–8)	Reitz Arena (1,107); Baltimore, MD
Feb 12, 2020; 7:00 pm		at American	L 76–81	12–14 (4–9)	Bender Arena (716); Washington, D.C.
Feb 16, 2020; 2:00 pm		Colgate	W 84–80	13–14 (5–9)	Reitz Arena (878); Baltimore, MD
Feb 19, 2020; 7:00 pm		Army	W 81–77	14–14 (6–9)	Reitz Arena (843); Baltimore, MD
Feb 23, 2020; 2:00 pm		at Lafayette	W 70–68	15–14 (7–9)	Kirby Sports Center (1,481); Easton, PA
Feb 26, 2020; 7:00 pm		at Navy	L 57–62	15–15 (7–10)	Alumni Hall (1,446); Annapolis, MD
Feb 29, 2020; 5:00 pm		Lehigh	L 71–74	15–16 (7–11)	Reitz Arena (524); Baltimore, MD
Patriot League tournament
Mar 3, 2020; 7:00 pm, PLN	(9)	at (8) Lehigh; First round	L 75–78	15–17	Stabler Arena (716); Bethlehem, PA
*Non-conference game. ^{#}Rankings from AP Poll. (#) Tournament seedings in parentheses. All times are in Eastern Time.
