= 2019–20 Boston University Terriers men's basketball team =

American college basketball season

2019–20 Boston University Terriers men's basketball

Patriot League tournament champions
- Conference: Patriot League
- Record: 21–13 (12–6 Patriot)
- Head coach: Joe Jones (9th season)
- Assistant coaches: Curtis Wilson; Walt Corbean; Mike Quinn
- Home arena: Case Gym

2019–20 Patriot League men's basketball standings
	Conf.				Overall
Team	W		L	PCT	W		L	PCT
Colgate	14	–	4	.778	25	–	9	.735
American	12	–	6	.667	16	–	14	.533
Boston University †	12	–	6	.667	21	–	13	.618
Army	10	–	8	.556	15	–	15	.500
Lafayette	10	–	8	.556	19	–	12	.613
Navy	8	–	10	.444	14	–	16	.467
Bucknell	8	–	10	.444	14	–	20	.412
Lehigh	7	–	11	.389	11	–	21	.344
Loyola (MD)	7	–	11	.389	15	–	17	.469
Holy Cross	2	–	16	.111	3	–	29	.094
† 2020 Patriot League tournament winner

The 2019–20 Boston University Terriers men's basketball team represented Boston University during the 2019–20 NCAA Division I men's basketball season. The Terriers, led by ninth-year head coach Joe Jones, played their home games at Case Gym as members of the Patriot League. They finished the season 21–13, 12–6 in Patriot League play to finish in a tie for second place. They defeated Navy, Bucknell and Colgate to be champions of the Patriot League tournament. They received the Patriot League's automatic bid to the NCAA tournament. However, the NCAA Tournament was cancelled amid the COVID-19 pandemic.

== Previous season ==
The Terriers finished the 2018–19 season 15–18, 7–11 in Patriot League play to finish in a three-way tie for seventh place. As the No. 8 seed in the Patriot League tournament, they defeated Loyola (MD) in the first round before losing to top-seeded Colgate in the quarterfinals.

== Roster ==
2019–20 Boston University Terriers men's basketball team
Players
Coaches

Pos.	#	Name	Height	Weight	Year	Previous school	Hometown
G	0	Ethan Brittain-Watts	6 ft 2 in (1.88 m)	180 lb (82 kg)	Fr	Culver Academies	Indianapolis, Indiana
G	1	Garrett Pascoe (redshirt)	6 ft 3 in (1.91 m)	180 lb (82 kg)	So	Clayton Valley Charter High School	Concord, California
G	3	Alex Vilarino	6 ft 2 in (1.88 m)	180 lb (82 kg)	RS So	Texas Tech	McKinney, Texas
G/F	5	Walter Whyte	6 ft 6 in (1.98 m)	210 lb (95 kg)	RS So	St. Luke's School	New Haven, Connecticut
G	13	Daman Tate (redshirt)	6 ft 5 in (1.96 m)	190 lb (86 kg)	Fr	Cushing Academy	Roxbury, Massachusetts
G	14	Andrew Petcash	6 ft 4 in (1.93 m)	200 lb (91 kg)	Jr	Pine-Richland High School	Pittsburgh, Pennsylvania
G	15	Jonas Harper (W)	6 ft 2 in (1.88 m)	190 lb (86 kg)	So	St. Luke's School	Stamford, Connecticut
G	20	Tarkan Taboglu (W)	6 ft 2 in (1.88 m)	185 lb (84 kg)	Fr	Torrey Pines High School	San Diego, California
G	25	Adam Mikula	6 ft 2 in (1.88 m)	185 lb (84 kg)	Sr	Brimmer and May School	East Boston, Massachusetts
G	30	Javante McCoy	6 ft 5 in (1.96 m)	180 lb (82 kg)	Jr	Phillips Exeter Academy	Milwaukee, Wisconsin
G	31	Michael Quinn (W)	6 ft 0 in (1.83 m)	180 lb (82 kg)	Fr	Taunton High School	Taunton, Massachusetts
F	32	Jack Hemphill	6 ft 9 in (2.06 m)	230 lb (104 kg)	So	Ravenscroft School	Raleigh, North Carolina
F	34	Tim Uzoegbu (W)	6 ft 4 in (1.93 m)	185 lb (84 kg)	Fr	Medway High School	Medway, Massachusetts
G/F	35	Fletcher Tynen	6 ft 7 in (2.01 m)	195 lb (88 kg)	So	Bishop Montgomery High School	Torrance, California
F	41	Sukhmail Mathon	6 ft 10 in (2.08 m)	225 lb (102 kg)	Jr	Holderness School	Shavertown, Pennsylvania
F	51	Max Mahoney (C)	6 ft 8 in (2.03 m)	235 lb (107 kg)	Sr	Ridge High School	Basking Ridge, New Jersey

Head coach

- Joe Jones (SUNY–Oswego)

Assistant coach(es)

- Curtis Wilson (Adelphi)
- Walt Corbean (Northern Kentucky)
- Mike Quinn (Bentley)

Legend

- (C) Team captain
- (S) Suspended
- (I) Ineligible
- (W) Walk-on
- Injured
- Current redshirt

Roster
Last update: January 8, 2020

== Schedule and results ==
Date time, TV	Rank^{#}	Opponent^{#}	Result	Record	Site (attendance) city, state
Non-conference regular season
Nov 5, 2019*; 7:00 pm		Northeastern	L 67–72	0–1	Case Gym (1,171); Boston, MA
Nov 9, 2019*; 1:00 pm		SUNY Poly	W 91–63	1–1	Case Gym (1,185); Boston, MA
Nov 13, 2019*; 7:00 pm		at Vermont	L 47–62	1–2	Patrick Gym (2,780); Burlington, VT
Nov 16, 2019*; 4:00 pm, NESN		New Hampshire	W 84–70	2–2	Case Gym (2,579); Boston, MA
Nov 19, 2019*; 7:00 pm, SECN+		at South Carolina	W 78–70	3–2	Colonial Life Arena (10,113); Columbia, SC
Nov 22, 2019*; 7:00 pm, Nexstar		at West Virginia	L 44–69	3–3	WVU Coliseum (10,743); Morgantown, WV
Nov 26, 2019*; 3:00 pm		vs. Northern Colorado; Cancún Challenge Mayan Division semifinals	L 55–78	3–4	Hard Rock Hotel Riviera Convention Center (253); Cancún, Mexico
Nov 27, 2019*; 12:30 pm		vs. UT Martin; Cancún Challenge Mayan Division	L 73–76	3–5	Hard Rock Hotel Riviera Convention Center (107); Cancún, Mexico
Dec 4, 2019*; 7:00 pm		at George Washington	L 63–64	3–6	Charles E. Smith Center (1,731); Washington, D.C.
Dec 7, 2019*; 2:00 pm, ESPN3		at Binghamton	L 79–84 ^{OT}	3–7	Binghamton University Events Center (2,005); Vestal, NY
Dec 14, 2019*; 1:00 pm		Dartmouth	W 78–76	4–7	Case Gym (691); Boston, MA
Dec 21, 2019*; 1:00 pm, ESPN3		at UMass Lowell	W 74–62	5–7	Tsongas Center (773); Lowell, MA
Dec 29, 2019*; 6:00 pm		at Merrimack	W 69–67	6–7	Merrimack Athletics Complex (867); North Andover, MA
Patriot League regular season
Jan 2, 2020; 7:00 pm		Lafayette	W 73–72	7–7 (1–0)	Case Gym (456); Boston, MA
Jan 5, 2020; 3:00 pm		at American	L 63–67	7–8 (1–1)	Bender Arena (291); Washington, D.C.
Jan 8, 2020; 7:00 pm		Lehigh	W 84–67	8–8 (2–1)	Case Gym (385); Boston, MA
Jan 11, 2020; 1:00 pm		Army	W 81–59	9–8 (3–1)	Case Gym (471); Boston, MA
Jan 13, 2020; 7:00 pm, CBSSN		at Loyola (MD)	W 85–53	10–8 (4–1)	Reitz Arena (1,109); Annapolis, MD
Jan 18, 2020; 2:00 pm		at Colgate	L 70–79	10–9 (4–2)	Cotterell Court (901); Hamilton, NY
Jan 22, 2020; 7:00 pm, NESN		Navy	L 58–60 ^{OT}	10–10 (4–3)	Case Gym (1,153); Boston, MA
Jan 25, 2020; 2:00 pm, NESN		at Holy Cross; Turnpike Trophy	W 79–64	11–10 (5–3)	Hart Center (2,063); Worcester, MA
Jan 29, 2020; 7:00 pm, NESN+		Loyola (MD)	W 92–77	12–10 (6–3)	Case Gym (742); Boston, MA
Feb 1, 2020; 2:00 pm		at Bucknell	W 77–57	13–10 (7–3)	Sojka Pavilion (2,417); Lewisburg, PA
Feb 5, 2020; 7:00 pm		at Army	W 80–66	14–10 (8–3)	Christl Arena (726); West Point, NY
Feb 8, 2020; 1:00 pm		Holy Cross; Turnpike Trophy	W 77–68	15–10 (9–3)	Case Gym (845); Boston, MA
Feb 10, 2020; 7:00 pm, CBSSN		Colgate	L 63–79	15–11 (9–4)	Case Gym (656); Boston, MA
Feb 15, 2020; 4:00 pm		at Navy	W 77–54	16–11 (10–4)	Alumni Hall (1,738); Annapolis, MD
Feb 19, 2020; 7:00 pm		at Lafayette	L 59–61	16–12 (10–5)	Kirby Sports Center (1,776); Easton, PA
Feb 23, 2020; 12:00 pm, CBSSN		American	W 64–60	17–12 (11–5)	Case Gym (934); Boston, MA
Feb 26, 2020; 7:00 pm		at Lehigh	L 55–57 ^{OT}	17–13 (11–6)	Stabler Arena (930); Bethlehem, PA
Feb 29, 2020; 12:00 pm		Bucknell	W 74–71	18–13 (12–6)	Case Gym (908); Boston, MA
Patriot League tournament
Mar 5, 2020; 7:00 pm, PLN	(3)	(6) Navy; Quarterfinals	W 69–63	19–13	Case Gym (517); Boston, MA
Mar 8, 2020; 2:00 pm, CBSSN	(3)	(7) Bucknell; Semifinals	W 64–61	20–13	Case Gym (1,334); Boston, MA
Mar 11, 2020; 7:30 pm, CBSSN	(3)	at (1) Colgate; Championship game	W 64–61	21–13	Cottrell Court (1,724); Hamilton, NY
NCAA tournament
			Cancelled due to the COVID-19 pandemic		
*Non-conference game. ^{#}Rankings from AP Poll. (#) Tournament seedings in parentheses. All times are in Eastern Time.
