= Justin Jaworski =

American basketball player

- Jaworski with Heidelberg in 2024

No. 11 – Basket Zaragoza
- Position: Shooting guard
- League: Liga ACB

Personal information
- Born: June 21, 1999 (age 27) Schwenksville, Pennsylvania, U.S.
- Listed height: 6 ft 3 in (1.91 m)
- Listed weight: 196 lb (89 kg)

Career information
- High school: Perkiomen Valley (Collegeville, Pennsylvania)
- College: Lafayette (2017–2021)
- NBA draft: 2021: undrafted
- Playing career: 2021–present

Career history
- 2021–2022: Oklahoma City Blue
- 2022–2023: Iowa Wolves
- 2023: Napoli Basket
- 2024: MLP Academics Heidelberg
- 2024–2025: Baskets Oldenburg
- 2025–2026: Bilbao
- 2026–present: Zaragoza

Career highlights
- FIBA Europe Cup champion (2026); First-team All-Patriot League (2021); Second-team All-Patriot League (2020); Third-team All-Patriot League (2019)
- Stats at Basketball Reference

Justin Kyle Jaworski (born June 21, 1999) is an American professional basketball player for Casademont Zaragoza of the Liga ACB. He played college basketball for the Lafayette Leopards.

== High school career ==
Jaworski played basketball for Perkiomen Valley High School in Collegeville, Pennsylvania. He averaged 22.2 points per game as a senior, and was named All-Area Player of the Year by The Mercury. Jaworski committed to playing college basketball for Lafayette, his only other NCAA Division I offer coming from American. He was also a standout football player in high school and turned down over 20 college football offers.

== College career ==
On November 29, 2017, Jaworski scored a freshman season-high 24 points in a 74–70 loss to Drexel. As a freshman, he averaged 10.8 points and 2.2 rebounds per game. On November 7, 2018, Jaworski posted a sophomore season-high 28 points and five rebounds in a 93–86 loss to Saint Peter's. He averaged 14.6 points, 2.9 rebounds and 2.7 assists per game as a sophomore, earning Third Team All-Patriot League recognition. Jaworski shot 48.9 percent from three-point range, which ranked second in the nation. On February 1, 2020, he scored a junior season-high 32 points in an 82–70 win against American. Jaworski missed the final seven games of the season with a torn anterior cruciate ligament. As a junior, he averaged 17.1 points, 2.8 assists and 2.7 rebounds per game, and was a Second Team All-Patriot League selection. On January 2, 2021, Jaworski made his senior season debut, recording a career-high 37 points, eight rebounds and four assists in a 90–89 overtime loss to Lehigh. As a senior, he averaged 21.5 points, 3.7 rebounds and 2.3 assists per game. Jaworski was named to the First Team All-Patriot League and led the conference in scoring. He chose to forgo his additional year of college eligibility.

== Professional career ==
After going undrafted in the 2021 NBA draft, Jaworski joined the Atlanta Hawks for the 2021 NBA Summer League. He was signed by the Oklahoma City Thunder on October 16, 2021, but was waived the following day. He subsequently joined the G League affiliate, the Oklahoma City Blue.

On February 12, 2023, Jaworski was traded from the Iowa Wolves to the Lakeland Magic in exchange for Simisola Shittu.

On July 12, 2023, he signed with Napoli Basket of the Italian Lega Basket Serie A (LBA).

On June 18, 2024, he signed with Baskets Oldenburg of the German Basketball Bundesliga (BBL).

On June 27, 2025, he signed with Bilbao Basket of the Liga ACB.

On July 19, 2026, he signed with Zaragoza of the Liga ACB.

== Career statistics ==
Legend
GP	Games played	GS	Games started	MPG	Minutes per game
FG%	Field goal percentage	3P%	3-point field goal percentage	FT%	Free throw percentage
RPG	Rebounds per game	APG	Assists per game	SPG	Steals per game
BPG	Blocks per game	PPG	Points per game	**Bold**	Career high

=== College ===
Year	Team	GP	GS	MPG	FG%	3P%	FT%	RPG	APG	SPG	BPG	PPG
2017–18	Lafayette	29	13	28.7	.440	.430	.852	2.2	1.7	.5	**.1**	10.8
2018–19	Lafayette	**30**	**29**	30.6	**.505**	**.489**	.864	2.9	2.7	.7	.0	14.6
2019–20	Lafayette	24	24	32.3	.442	.360	.867	2.7	**2.8**	1.0	.0	17.1
2020–21	Lafayette	15	15	**36.1**	.463	.398	**.913**	**3.7**	2.3	**1.5**	.0	**21.5**
Career		98	81	31.3	.463	.422	.876	2.7	2.4	.8	.0	15.1
