= 2019–20 Bucknell Bison men's basketball team =

American college basketball season

2019–20 Bucknell Bison men's basketball
- Conference: Patriot League
- Record: 14–20 (8–10 Patriot)
- Head coach: Nathan Davis (5th season)
- Assistant coaches: Paul Harrison; Johnathan Brown; Joe Meehan
- Home arena: Sojka Pavilion

2019–20 Patriot League men's basketball standings
	Conf.				Overall
Team	W		L	PCT	W		L	PCT
Colgate	14	–	4	.778	25	–	9	.735
American	12	–	6	.667	16	–	14	.533
Boston University †	12	–	6	.667	21	–	13	.618
Army	10	–	8	.556	15	–	15	.500
Lafayette	10	–	8	.556	19	–	12	.613
Navy	8	–	10	.444	14	–	16	.467
Bucknell	8	–	10	.444	14	–	20	.412
Lehigh	7	–	11	.389	11	–	21	.344
Loyola (MD)	7	–	11	.389	15	–	17	.469
Holy Cross	2	–	16	.111	3	–	29	.094
† 2020 Patriot League tournament winner

The 2019–20 Bucknell Bison men's basketball team represented Bucknell University during the 2019–20 NCAA Division I men's basketball season. The Bison, led by fifth-year head coach Nathan Davis, played their home games at Sojka Pavilion in Lewisburg, Pennsylvania as members of the Patriot League. They finished the season 14–20, 8–10 in Patriot League play to finish in a tie for sixth place. They defeated Holy Cross and American to advance to the semifinals of the Patriot League tournament where they lost to Boston University.

== Previous season ==
The Bison finished the 2018–19 season 21–12, 13–5 to earn a share of the regular season Patriot League championship. As the No. 2 seed in the Patriot League tournament, they defeated Holy Cross and Lehigh before losing to Colgate in the championship game. They were not selected for postseason play.

== Roster ==
2019–20 Bucknell Bison men's basketball team
Players
Coaches

Pos.	#	Name	Height	Weight	Year	Previous school	Hometown
C	0	Paul Newman	6 ft 9 in (2.06 m)	245 lb (111 kg)	Jr	St. Andrew's School	Philadelphia, Pennsylvania
G	2	Walter Ellis	6 ft 5 in (1.96 m)	190 lb (86 kg)	So	Brewster Academy	Granger, Indiana
F	3	Malachi Rhodes	6 ft 8 in (2.03 m)	225 lb (102 kg)	Fr	Wheeler	Marietta, Georgia
G	4	Jimmy Sotos	6 ft 3 in (1.91 m)	195 lb (88 kg)	Jr	Conant	Elk Grove Village, Illinois
G	5	Jordan Sechan	6 ft 0 in (1.83 m)	180 lb (82 kg)	Jr	Northfield Mount Hermon	New Canaan, Connecticut
G	10	Andrew Funk	6 ft 5 in (1.96 m)	187 lb (85 kg)	So	Archbishop Wood	Warrington, Pennsylvania
G	11	Avi Toomer	6 ft 3 in (1.91 m)	190 lb (86 kg)	Sr	Grady	Atlanta, Georgia
F	12	John Meeks	6 ft 6 in (1.98 m)	230 lb (104 kg)	Jr	The Burlington School	Burlington, North Carolina
F	13	Bruce Moore	6 ft 8 in (2.03 m)	208 lb (94 kg)	Sr	McDonogh	Randallstown, Maryland
G	14	Ben Robertson	6 ft 5 in (1.96 m)	203 lb (92 kg)	Sr	High Point Christian	High Point, North Carolina
G	21	Xander Rice	6 ft 3 in (1.91 m)	179 lb (81 kg)	Fr	The Patrick School	West Long Branch, New Jersey
F	23	Kahliel Spear	6 ft 7 in (2.01 m)	207 lb (94 kg)	So	The Colony	The Colony, Texas
F	32	Jake van der Heijden	6 ft 8 in (2.03 m)	212 lb (96 kg)	Fr	Ravenscroft	Raleigh, North Carolina
C	40	Alex Timmerman	6 ft 9 in (2.06 m)	294 lb (133 kg)	Fr	Crystal Lake Central	Crystal Lake, Illinois

Head coach

- Nathan Davis (Randolph–Macon)

Assistant coach(es)

- Paul Harrison (Washington and Lee)
- Joe Meehan (Lebanon Valley)
- Johnathan Brown (Dominican (NY))

Legend

- (C) Team captain
- (S) Suspended
- (I) Ineligible
- (W) Walk-on
- Injured
- Current redshirt

Roster
Last update: January 8, 2020

== Schedule and results ==
Date time, TV	Rank^{#}	Opponent^{#}	Result	Record	Site (attendance) city, state
Non-conference regular season
Nov 5, 2019*; 7:00 pm		at Fairfield	W 68–64	1–0	Webster Bank Arena (1,063); Bridgeport, CT
Nov 10, 2019*; 2:00 pm		Vermont	L 63–66	1–1	Sojka Pavilion (2,321); Lewisburg, PA
Nov 13, 2019*; 7:00 pm		Hofstra	W 86–71	2–1	Sojka Pavilion (1,952); Lewisburg, PA
Nov 16, 2019*; 7:00 pm		at Canisius	L 81–83	2–2	Koessler Athletic Center (984); Buffalo, NY
Nov 19, 2019*; 6:30 pm, BTN		at Penn State; NIT Season Tip-Off campus site game	L 70–98	2–3	Bryce Jordan Center (6,797); University Park, PA
Nov 23, 2019*; 12:00 pm, ACCN		at Syracuse; NIT Season Tip-Off campus site game	L 46–97	2–4	Carrier Dome (2,579); Syracuse, NY
Nov 25, 2019*; 2:00 pm, ESPNU		vs. Seattle; NIT Season Tip-Off Orlando Subregional	W 77–70	3–4	HP Field House (250); Orlando, FL
Nov 26, 2019*; 2:00 pm, ESPNU		vs. Yale; NIT Season Tip-Off Orlando Bracket	L 61–81	3–5	HP Field House (250); Orlando, FL
Nov 30, 2019*; 2:00 pm		Princeton	L 77–87	3–6	Sojka Pavilion (1,959); Lewisburg, PA
Dec 3, 2019*; 7:00 pm, ESPN+		at Rider	L 69–89	3–7	Alumni Gymnasium (1,403); Lawrenceville, NJ
Dec 7, 2019*; 7:00 pm		Albany	W 65–64	4–7	Sojka Pavilion (2,059); Lewisburg, PA
Dec 21, 2019*; 6:00 pm, ESPN+		at Siena	L 71–81	4–8	Times Union Center (5,505); Albany, NY
Dec 28, 2019*; 2:00 pm, ESPN+		at La Salle	L 59–71	4–9	Tom Gola Arena (2,558); Philadelphia, PA
Patriot League regular season
Jan 2, 2020; 7:00 pm		Army	W 67–65	5–9 (1–0)	Sojka Pavilion (1,870); Lewisburg, PA
Jan 5, 2020; 2:00 pm		at Lafayette	W 78–66	6–9 (2–0)	Kirby Sports Center (1,502); Easton, PA
Jan 8, 2020; 7:00 pm		Navy	L 56–60	6–10 (2–1)	Sojka Pavilion (2,338); Lewisburg, PA
Jan 11, 2020; 2:00 pm		Holy Cross	W 75–60	7–10 (3–1)	Sojka Pavilion (2,575); Lewisburg, PA
Jan 15, 2020; 7:00 pm		at American	L 60–61	7–11 (3–2)	Bender Arena (683); Washington, D.C.
Jan 18, 2020; 7:00 pm		Lehigh	W 72–56	8–11 (4–2)	Sojka Pavilion (2,339); Lewisburg, PA
Jan 20, 2020; 7:00 pm, CBSSN		at Colgate	L 65–80	8–12 (4–3)	Cotterell Court (1,315); Hamilton, NY
Jan 25, 2020; 7:00 pm, Stadium		Loyola (MD)	W 98–83	9–12 (5–3)	Sojka Pavilion (2,588); Lewisburg, PA
Jan 29, 2020; 11:00 am		at Army	L 59–68	9–13 (5–4)	Christl Arena (2,962); West Point, NY
Feb 1, 2020; 2:00 pm		Boston University	L 57–77	9–14 (5–5)	Sojka Pavilion (2,417); Lewisburg, PA
Feb 3, 2020; 7:00 pm, CBSSN		Lafayette	L 62–65	9–15 (5–6)	Sojka Pavilion (2,011); Lewisburg, PA
Feb 8, 2020; 5:00 pm		at Loyola (MD)	L 65–78	9–16 (5–7)	Reitz Arena (1,107); Baltimore, MD
Feb 12, 2020; 7:00 pm		at Navy	L 59–60	9–17 (5–8)	Alumni Hall (660); Annapolis, MD
Feb 15, 2020; 2:00 pm, Stadium		American	W 72–68	10–17 (6–8)	Sojka Pavilion (2,785); Lewisburg, PA
Feb 17, 2020; 7:00 pm		at Holy Cross	W 69–48	11–17 (7–8)	Hart Center (1,333); Worcester, MA
Feb 23, 2020; 12:00 pm		at Lehigh	L 60–69	11–18 (7–9)	Stabler Arena (1,626); Bethlehem, PA
Feb 26, 2020; 7:00 pm		Colgate	W 71–70	12–18 (8–9)	Sojka Pavilion (2,497); Lewisburg, PA
Feb 29, 2020; 12:00 pm		at Boston University	L 71–74	12–19 (8–10)	Case Gym (908); Boston, MA
Patriot League tournament
Mar 3, 2020; 7:00 pm, PLN	(7)	(10) Holy Cross; First round	W 65–62	13–19	Sojka Pavilion (1,507); Lewisburg, PA
Mar 5, 2020; 7:00 pm, PLN	(7)	at (2) American; Quarterfinals	W 64–59	14–19	Bender Arena (1,039); Washington, D.C.
Mar 8, 2020; 2:00 pm, CBSSN	(7)	at (3) Boston University; Semifinals	L 61–64	14–20	Case Gym (1,334); Boston, MA
*Non-conference game. ^{#}Rankings from AP Poll. (#) Tournament seedings in parentheses. All times are in Eastern Time.
