= 2019–20 Army Black Knights men's basketball team =

American college basketball season

2019–20 Army Black Knights men's basketball
- Conference: Patriot League
- Record: 15–15 (10–8 Patriot)
- Head coach: Jimmy Allen (4th season)
- Assistant coaches: David Belfield; Drew Adams; Ben Wilkins; Zak Boisvert
- Home arena: Christl Arena

2019–20 Patriot League men's basketball standings
	Conf.				Overall
Team	W		L	PCT	W		L	PCT
Colgate	14	–	4	.778	25	–	9	.735
American	12	–	6	.667	16	–	14	.533
Boston University †	12	–	6	.667	21	–	13	.618
Army	10	–	8	.556	15	–	15	.500
Lafayette	10	–	8	.556	19	–	12	.613
Navy	8	–	10	.444	14	–	16	.467
Bucknell	8	–	10	.444	14	–	20	.412
Lehigh	7	–	11	.389	11	–	21	.344
Loyola (MD)	7	–	11	.389	15	–	17	.469
Holy Cross	2	–	16	.111	3	–	29	.094
† 2020 Patriot League tournament winner

The 2019–20 Army Black Knights men's basketball team represented the United States Military Academy during the 2019–20 NCAA Division I men's basketball season. The Black Knights were led by fourth-year head coach Jimmy Allen, and played their home games at Christl Arena in West Point, New York as members of the Patriot League. They finished the season 15–15, 10–8 in Patriot League play, to finish in a tie for fourth place. They lost in the quarterfinals of the Patriot League tournament to Lafayette.

== Roster ==
2019–20 Army Black Knights men's basketball team
Players
Coaches

Pos.	#	Name	Height	Weight	Year	Previous school	Hometown
G	0	Josh Caldwell	6 ft 2 in (1.88 m)	185 lb (84 kg)	So	Heathwood Hall	Columbia, SC
G	2	Brendan Thiele	6 ft 5 in (1.96 m)	205 lb (93 kg)	So	St. Peter's Prep	Kearny, NJ
G	3	Tommy Funk (C)	5 ft 11 in (1.8 m)	190 lb (86 kg)	Sr	Archbishop Wood	Warrington, PA
F	4	Chris Mann	6 ft 6 in (1.98 m)	205 lb (93 kg)	Fr	Phillipsburg	Phillipsburg, NJ
G	5	Mark Madden	6 ft 5 in (1.96 m)	210 lb (95 kg)	Jr	St. Joseph	South Bend, IN
G	10	Tucker Blackwell	6 ft 2 in (1.88 m)	190 lb (86 kg)	Jr	Bloomington	Bloomington, IN
F	12	Nick Finke	6 ft 7 in (2.01 m)	223 lb (101 kg)	Jr	Champaign Central	Champaign, IL
G	13	Lonnie Grayson	6 ft 0 in (1.83 m)	180 lb (82 kg)	Jr	Wyoming HS	Cincinnati, OH
F/C	14	Matt Wilson (C)	6 ft 9 in (2.06 m)	245 lb (111 kg)	Sr	Campbell County	Alexandria, KY
G	21	Will Culliton	6 ft 2 in (1.88 m)	187 lb (85 kg)	Sr	Breck School	Wayzata, MN
G	23	Aaron Duhart	6 ft 0 in (1.83 m)	190 lb (86 kg)	So	Trinity Episcopal	Richmond, VA
G	25	Jordan Coleman	6 ft 6 in (1.98 m)	190 lb (86 kg)	So	Greenwood	Greenwood, SC
F	30	Ben Kinker	6 ft 9 in (2.06 m)	220 lb (100 kg)	So	Oldenburg Academy	Greensburg, IN
G	32	John Scully	6 ft 1 in (1.85 m)	185 lb (84 kg)	So	Flower Mound	Flower Mound, TX
C	33	Sam Parini	6 ft 11 in (2.11 m)	240 lb (109 kg)	Fr	Fairview	Erie, PA
F	35	Alex King	6 ft 8 in (2.03 m)	200 lb (91 kg)	Jr	Columbus North	Columbus, IN
F/C	42	Miles Lightfoot	6 ft 9 in (2.06 m)	210 lb (95 kg)	Fr	Gilbert Christian	Gilbert, AZ
F	43	Keeston Smith	6 ft 5 in (1.96 m)	210 lb (95 kg)	Sr	La Salle Catholic College Prep	Oregon City, OR
F	52	Ben Jensen	6 ft 10 in (2.08 m)	200 lb (91 kg)	Fr	W.T. Woodson	Fairfax, VA
G	53	Lance Lawson	6 ft 2 in (1.88 m)	195 lb (88 kg)	Sr	Ardrey Kell	Charlotte, NC

Head coach

- Jimmy Allen (Emory & Henry)

Assistant coach(es)

- Drew Adams (Chicago)
- Ben Wilkins (NC State)
- Zak Boisvert (Fordham)
- David Belfield (USC Aiken)

Legend

- (C) Team captain
- (S) Suspended
- (I) Ineligible
- (W) Walk-on
- Injured
- Current redshirt

Roster
Last update: January 9, 2020

== Schedule and results ==
Date time, TV	Rank^{#}	Opponent^{#}	Result	Record	Site (attendance) city, state
Non-conference regular season
November 5, 2019*; 8:30 p.m., FS1		at No. 10 Villanova	L 54–97	0–1	Finneran Pavilion (6,501); Villanova, PA
November 8, 2019*; 6:00 p.m.		USMMA	W 80–43	1–1	Christl Arena (759); West Point, NY
November 12, 2019*; 7:00 p.m.		Air Force	L 57–69	1–2	Christl Arena (546); West Point, NY
November 18, 2019*; 7:00 p.m.		Fairleigh Dickinson	W 81–65	2–2	Christl Arena (484); West Point, NY
November 23, 2019*; 4:00 p.m., ESPN+		at Binghamton	L 73–88	2–3	Binghamton University Events Center (2,514); Vestal, NY
November 30, 2019*; 7:00 p.m., ESPN+		at Marist	W 66–64 ^{OT}	3–3	McCann Arena (1,312); Poughkeepsie, NY
December 4, 2019*; 7:30 p.m.		NJIT	W 75–65	4–3	Christl Arena (658); West Point, NY
December 7, 2019*; 1:00 p.m.		LIU	L 72–85	4–4	Christl Arena (532); West Point, NY
December 11, 2019*; 7:00 p.m.		at Merrimack	L 60–69	4–5	Merrimack Athletics Complex (1,500); North Andover, MA
December 14, 2019*; 2:00 p.m., ESPN+		at Buffalo	W 89–76	5–5	Alumni Arena (3,693); Amherst, NY
December 21, 2019*; 2:00 p.m.		at Wagner	L 62–82	5–6	Spiro Sports Center (1,119); Staten Island, NY
Patriot League regular season
January 2, 2020; 7:00 p.m.		at Bucknell	L 65–67	5–7 (0–1)	Sojka Pavilion (1,870); Lewisburg, PA
January 6, 2020; 7:00 p.m., CBSSN		Colgate	L 65–70	5–8 (0–2)	Christl Arena (814); West Point, NY
January 8, 2020; 7:00 p.m.		American	L 60–68	5–9 (0–3)	Christl Arena (696); West Point, NY
January 11, 2020; 1:00 p.m.		at Boston University	L 59–81	5–10 (0–4)	Case Gym (471); Boston, MA
January 16, 2020 (Note: Originally scheduled for January 15, 2020 at 7:00 p.m.); 2:00 p.m.		at Holy Cross	W 79–67	6–10 (1–4)	Hart Center (1,047); Worcester, MA
January 18, 2020; 1:00 p.m.		Loyola (MD)	W 81–80	7–10 (2–4)	Christl Arena (1,595); West Point, NY
January 22, 2020; 7:00 p.m.		at Lafayette	W 94–74	8–10 (3–4)	Kirby Sports Center (1,447); Easton, PA
January 25, 2020; 1:30 p.m., CBSSN		at Navy	W 73–66	9–10 (4–4)	Alumni Hall (5,316); Annapolis, MD
January 29, 2020; 11:00 a.m.		Bucknell	W 68–59	10–10 (5–4)	Christl Arena (2,962); West Point, NY
February 1, 2020; 7:00 p.m.		at Lehigh	W 80–79	11–10 (6–4)	Stabler Arena (1,324); Bethlehem, PA
February 5, 2020; 7:00 p.m.		Boston University	L 66–80	11–11 (6–5)	Christl Arena (726); West Point, NY
February 8, 2020; 2:00 p.m.		at American	L 62–72	11–12 (6–6)	Bender Arena (1,063); Washington, D.C.
February 12, 2020; 7:00 p.m.		Lafayette	W 65–48	12–12 (7–6)	Christl Arena (428); West Point, NY
February 15, 2020; 1:00 p.m.		Lehigh	W 79–66	13–12 (8–6)	Christl Arena (1,112); West Point, NY
February 19, 2020; 7:00 p.m.		at Loyola (MD)	L 77–81	13–13 (8–7)	Reitz Arena (843); Baltimore, MD
February 22, 2020; 1:30 p.m., CBSSN		Navy	W 86–75 ^{OT}	14–13 (9–7)	Christl Arena (4,636); West Point, NY
February 26, 2020; 7:00 p.m.		Holy Cross	W 67–61	15–13 (10–7)	Christl Arena (817); West Point, NY
February 29, 2020; 12:00 p.m., CBSSN		at Colgate	L 65–91	15–14 (10–8)	Cotterell Court (984); Hamilton, NY
Patriot League tournament
March 5, 2020; 7:00 p.m., PLN	(4)	(5) Lafayette; Quarterfinals	L 68–73	15–15	Christl Arena (334); West Point, NY
*Non-conference game. ^{#}Rankings from AP poll. (#) Tournament seedings in parentheses. All times are in Eastern.
