= 2019–20 Lehigh Mountain Hawks men's basketball team =

American college basketball season

2019–20 Lehigh Mountain Hawks men's basketball
- Conference: Patriot League
- Record: 11–21 (7–11 Patriot)
- Head coach: Brett Reed (13th season)
- Assistant coaches: Quinn McDowell; Harry Morra; Noel Hightower
- Home arena: Stabler Arena

2019–20 Patriot League men's basketball standings
	Conf.				Overall
Team	W		L	PCT	W		L	PCT
Colgate	14	–	4	.778	25	–	9	.735
American	12	–	6	.667	16	–	14	.533
Boston University †	12	–	6	.667	21	–	13	.618
Army	10	–	8	.556	15	–	15	.500
Lafayette	10	–	8	.556	19	–	12	.613
Navy	8	–	10	.444	14	–	16	.467
Bucknell	8	–	10	.444	14	–	20	.412
Lehigh	7	–	11	.389	11	–	21	.344
Loyola (MD)	7	–	11	.389	15	–	17	.469
Holy Cross	2	–	16	.111	3	–	29	.094
† 2020 Patriot League tournament winner

The 2019–20 Lehigh Mountain Hawks men's basketball team represented Lehigh University during the 2019–20 NCAA Division I men's basketball season. The Mountain Hawks, led by 13th-year head coach Brett Reed, played their home games at Stabler Arena in Bethlehem, Pennsylvania as members of the Patriot League. They finished the season 11–21, 7–11 in Patriot League play to finish in a tie for eighth place. They defeated Loyola (MD) in the first round of the Patriot League tournament before losing in the quarterfinals to Colgate.

== Roster ==
2019–20 Lehigh Mountain Hawks men's basketball team
Players
Coaches

Pos.	#	Name	Height	Weight	Year	Previous school	Hometown
F	0	Jakob Alamudun	6 ft 6 in (1.98 m)	225 lb (102 kg)	Fr	Marina High School	Huntington Beach, California
F	1	Jeameril Wilson	6 ft 7 in (2.01 m)	200 lb (91 kg)	So	Notre Dame College Prep	Chicago, Illinois
G	2	Jake Betlow	6 ft 2 in (1.88 m)	165 lb (75 kg)	Fr	St. Benedict's	Far Hills, New Jersey
G	4	Andrei Arion	6 ft 3 in (1.91 m)	180 lb (82 kg)	Fr	American International School of Bucharest	Bucharest, Romania
G	5	Evan Taylor	6 ft 6 in (1.98 m)	200 lb (91 kg)	Fr	Glenbard West High School	Glen Ellyn, Illinois
G	10	David Roelke	6 ft 2 in (1.88 m)	180 lb (82 kg)	Sr	Sharon High School	Sharon, Massachusetts
G	11	Jordan Cohen	6 ft 2 in (1.88 m)	185 lb (84 kg)	Sr	Campbell Hall	Tarzana, California
C	13	James Karnik	6 ft 9 in (2.06 m)	225 lb (102 kg)	Jr	Orangeville Prep	Surrey, British Columbia
G	15	Reed Fenton	6 ft 4 in (1.93 m)	165 lb (75 kg)	Fr	Greater Latrobe High School	Latrobe, Pennsylvania
G	20	Marques Wilson	6 ft 4 in (1.93 m)	210 lb (95 kg)	Jr	Edmond North High School	Edmond, Oklahoma
C	21	Scott Vollmer	7 ft 0 in (2.13 m)	225 lb (102 kg)	Fr	St. Luke's School	Wilton, Connecticut
F	25	Ed Porter	6 ft 7 in (2.01 m)	215 lb (98 kg)	Sr	Eastside High School	Hawthorne, Florida
C	42	Jack Lieb	6 ft 10 in (2.08 m)	245 lb (111 kg)	Sr	Brewster Academy	Deerfield, Illinois
C	44	Nic Lynch	6 ft 11 in (2.11 m)	250 lb (113 kg)	So	Seattle Prep	Seattle, Washington

Head coach

- Brett Reed (Wayne State (MI))

Assistant coach(es)

- Harry Morra (DeSales)
- Noel Hightower (Chestnut Hill)
- Quinn McDowell (William & Mary)

Legend

- (C) Team captain
- (S) Suspended
- (I) Ineligible
- (W) Walk-on
- Injured
- Current redshirt

Roster
Last update: January 9, 2020

== Schedule and results ==
Date time, TV	Rank^{#}	Opponent^{#}	Result	Record	Site (attendance) city, state
Non-conference regular season
Nov 5, 2019*; 7:00 pm		Monmouth	L 62–66	0–1	Stabler Arena (621); Bethlehem, PA
Nov 9, 2019*; 7:00 pm, ESPN3		at Albany	W 74–70	1–1	SEFCU Arena (2,039); Guilderland, NY
Nov 12, 2019*; 7:00 pm		Cairn	W 80–43	2–1	Stabler Arena (497); Bethlehem, PA
Nov 16, 2019*; 1:30 pm, ACCNX		at Virginia Tech	L 53–79	2–2	Cassell Coliseum (9,275); Blacksburg, VA
Nov 18, 2019*; 7:30 pm		Misericordia	W 87–68	3–2	Stabler Arena (702); Bethlehem, PA
Nov 21, 2019*; 8:00 pm, ESPN3		at Drake	L 58–74	3–3	Knapp Center (2,333); Des Moines, IA
Nov 23, 2019*; 8:00 pm		at Saint Mary's	L 66–77	3–4	University Credit Union Pavilion (3,059); Moraga, CA
Nov 30, 2019*; 4:00 pm		at Columbia	L 64–68	3–5	Levien Gymnasium (1,333); Manhattan, NY
Dec 4, 2019*; 7:00 pm		at Saint Francis (PA)	L 69–77	3–6	DeGol Arena (915); Loretto, PA
Dec 7, 2019*; 7:00 pm		Yale	L 65–78	3–7	Stabler Arena (818); Bethlehem, PA
Dec 21, 2019*; 6:00 pm, SECN		at No. 12 Auburn	L 51–74	3–8	Auburn Arena (9,121); Auburn, AL
Dec 29, 2019*; 4:00 pm, ESPN+		at Princeton	L 62–71	3–9	Jadwin Gymnasium (1,927); Princeton, NJ
Patriot League regular season
Jan 2, 2020; 7:00 pm		at Navy	L 58–64	3–10 (0–1)	Alumni Hall (703); Annapolis, MD
Jan 5, 2020; 2:00 pm		Loyola (MD)	W 71–58	4–10 (1–1)	Stabler Arena (801); Bethlehem, PA
Jan 8, 2020; 7:00 pm		at Boston University	L 67–84	4–11 (1–2)	Case Gym (385); Boston, MA
Jan 11, 2020; 7:00 pm		American	W 82–73	4–12 (2–2)	Stabler Arena (743); Bethlehem, PA
Jan 15, 2020; 7:00 pm, Stadium		Navy	L 83–88	5–12 (2–3)	Stabler Arena (1,004); Bethlehem, PA
Jan 18, 2020; 7:00 pm		at Bucknell	L 56–72	5–13 (2–4)	Sojka Pavilion (2,339); Lewisburg, PA
Jan 22, 2020; 7:00 pm		at Holy Cross	L 95–96 ^{OT}	5–14 (2–5)	Hart Center (1,028); Worcester, MA
Jan 25, 2020; 12:00 pm		Lafayette	L 56–74	5–15 (2–6)	Stabler Arena (1,248); Bethlehem, PA
Jan 27, 2020; 7:00 pm, CBSSN		at American	L 57–77	5–16 (2–7)	Bender Arena (787); Washington, D.C.
Feb 1, 2020; 7:00 pm		Army	L 79–80	5–17 (2–8)	Stabler Arena (1,324); Bethlehem, PA
Feb 5, 2020; 7:00 pm		Colgate	L 51–81	5–18 (2–9)	Stabler Arena (654); Bethlehem, PA
Feb 8, 2020; 2:00 pm		at Lafayette	W 62–59	6–18 (3–9)	Kirby Sports Center (2,453); Easton, PA
Feb 12, 2020; 7:00 pm		Holy Cross	W 89–82	7–18 (4–9)	Stabler Arena (752); Bethlehem, PA
Feb 15, 2020; 1:00 pm		at Army	L 66–79	7–19 (4–10)	Christl Arena (1,112); West Point, NY
Feb 19, 2020; 7:00 pm		at Colgate	L 67–70	7–20 (4–11)	Cotterell Court (1,776); Hamilton, NY
Feb 23, 2020; 12:00 pm		Bucknell	W 69–60	8–20 (5–11)	Stabler Arena (1,626); Bethlehem, PA
Feb 26, 2020; 7:00 pm		Boston University	W 57–55 ^{OT}	9–20 (6–11)	Stabler Arena (930); Bethlehem, PA
Feb 29, 2020; 5:00 pm		at Loyola (MD)	W 74–71	10–20 (7–11)	Reitz Arena (524); Baltimore, MD
Patriot League tournament
Mar 3, 2020; 7:00 pm, PLN	(8)	(9) Loyola (MD); First round	W 78–75	11–20	Stabler Arena (716); Bethlehem, PA
Mar 5, 2020; 7:00 pm, PLN	(8)	at (1) Colgate; Quarterfinals	L 70–83	11–21	Cotterell Court (1,368); Hamilton, NY
*Non-conference game. ^{#}Rankings from AP Poll. (#) Tournament seedings in parentheses. All times are in Eastern Time.
