= 2019–20 Colgate Raiders men's basketball team =

American college basketball season

2019–20 Colgate Raiders men's basketball

Patriot League regular season champions
- Conference: Patriot League
- Record: 25–9 (14–4 Patriot)
- Head coach: Matt Langel (9th season)
- Assistant coaches: Dave Klatsky; Mike Jordan; Pat Moore
- Home arena: Cotterell Court

2019–20 Patriot League men's basketball standings
	Conf.				Overall
Team	W		L	PCT	W		L	PCT
Colgate	14	–	4	.778	25	–	9	.735
American	12	–	6	.667	16	–	14	.533
Boston University †	12	–	6	.667	21	–	13	.618
Army	10	–	8	.556	15	–	15	.500
Lafayette	10	–	8	.556	19	–	12	.613
Navy	8	–	10	.444	14	–	16	.467
Bucknell	8	–	10	.444	14	–	20	.412
Lehigh	7	–	11	.389	11	–	21	.344
Loyola (MD)	7	–	11	.389	15	–	17	.469
Holy Cross	2	–	16	.111	3	–	29	.094
† 2020 Patriot League tournament winner

The 2019–20 Colgate Raiders men's basketball team represented Colgate University during the 2019–20 NCAA Division I men's basketball season. The Raiders, led by ninth-year head coach Matt Langel, played their home games at Cotterell Court in Hamilton, New York as members of the Patriot League. They finished the season 25–9, 14–4 in Patriot League play to win the Patriot League regular season championship. They defeated Lehigh and Lafayette to reach the championship game of the Patriot League tournament where they lost to Boston University. As a regular season league champion who failed to win their league tournament, they received an automatic bid to the 2020 National Invitation Tournament. However, the NIT and all other postseason tournaments were cancelled amid the COVID-19 pandemic.

== Previous season ==
The Raiders finished the 2018–19 season 24–11, 13–5 in Patriot League play to earn a share of the regular season championship. As the No. 1 seed in the Patriot League tournament, they defeated Boston University, Navy, and Bucknell to win the tournament championship. As a result, they received the conference's automatic bid to the NCAA tournament as the No. 15 in the South region. There they lost to Tennessee in the first round.

== Roster ==
2019–20 Colgate Raiders men's basketball team
Players
Coaches

Pos.	#	Name	Height	Weight	Year	Previous school	Hometown
G	0	Nelly Cummings	6 ft 0 in (1.83 m)	180 lb (82 kg)	RS So	Bowling Green	Midland, PA
G	1	Jordan Burns	6 ft 0 in (1.83 m)	175 lb (79 kg)	Jr	The Kent School	San Antonio, TX
G	2	Zach Light	6 ft 3 in (1.91 m)	195 lb (88 kg)	So	Northfield Mount Hermon	New York, NY
G	3	Pearson Parker	6 ft 1 in (1.85 m)	185 lb (84 kg)	Fr	Phillips Exeter	Los Angeles, CA
G	4	Ryan Moffatt	6 ft 6 in (1.98 m)	210 lb (95 kg)	Fr	Hempfield	Lancaster, PA
G	5	David Maynard	6 ft 4 in (1.93 m)	190 lb (86 kg)	Jr	Herriman	Herriman, UT
F	10	Will Rayman	6 ft 9 in (2.06 m)	215 lb (98 kg)	Sr	New Hampton School	New York, NY
G	13	Jack Ferguson	6 ft 3 in (1.91 m)	175 lb (79 kg)	Jr	Homestead	Fort Wayne, IN
F	14	Keegan Records	6 ft 10 in (2.08 m)	235 lb (107 kg)	Fr	St. Andrew's	South Kingstown, RI
G	15	Tucker Richardson	6 ft 5 in (1.96 m)	205 lb (93 kg)	So	Blair Academy	Flemington, NJ
F	22	Malcolm Bailey	6 ft 10 in (2.08 m)	200 lb (91 kg)	Fr	Ridley College	Stratford, ON
G	23	Milan Williams	6 ft 3 in (1.91 m)	210 lb (95 kg)	Sr	Detroit Country Day	Detroit, MI
F	25	Rapolas Ivanauskas	6 ft 10 in (2.08 m)	230 lb (104 kg)	Sr	Northwestern	Barrington, IL
G	33	Oliver Lynch-Daniels	6 ft 2 in (1.88 m)	190 lb (86 kg)	Jr	Houston Baptist	Chapel Hill, NC
F	35	Blake Henry	6 ft 8 in (2.03 m)	225 lb (102 kg)	Jr	Foothill College	Menlo Park, CA

Head coach

- Matt Langel (Penn)

Assistant coach(es)

- Dave Klatsky (Penn)
- Mike Jordan (Penn)
- Pat Moore (Colgate)

Legend

- (C) Team captain
- (S) Suspended
- (I) Ineligible
- (W) Walk-on
- Injured
- Current redshirt

Roster
Last update: January 5, 2020

== Schedule and results ==
Date time, TV	Rank^{#}	Opponent^{#}	Result	Record	Site (attendance) city, state
Non-conference regular season
Nov 6, 2019*; 7:00 pm		NJIT	W 80–75	1–0	Cotterell Court (871); Hamilton, NY
Nov 10, 2019*; 3:00 pm, ACCNX		at Clemson	L 68–81	1–1	Littlejohn Coliseum (5,673); Clemson, SC
Nov 13, 2019*; 7:00 pm, ACCRSN		at Syracuse	L 54–70	1–2	Carrier Dome (21,281); Syracuse, NY
Nov 18, 2019*; 8:00 pm, SECN		at No. 19 Auburn; Legends Classic	L 62–91	1–3	Auburn Arena (7,522); Auburn, AL
Nov 21, 2019*; 7:00 pm		SUNY Cortland	W 89–50	2–3	Cottrell Court (807); Hamilton, NY
Nov 24, 2019*; 5:00 pm, FloSports		vs. Cal State Northridge; Legends Classic	W 64–56	3–3	Resch Center (152); Ashwaubenon, WI
Nov 26, 2019*; 8:00 pm, FloSports		vs. Green Bay; Legends Classic	W 99–81	4–3	Resch Center (1,342); Ashwaubenon, WI
Nov 30, 2019*; 2:00 pm		Siena	W 72–62	5–3	Cotterell Court (872); Hamilton, NY
Dec 4, 2019*; 7:00 pm, ESPN3		at Binghamton	W 82–74	6–3	Binghamton University Events Center (1,626); Vestal, NY
Dec 8, 2019*; 1:00 pm, ESPN+		at Niagara	L 82–93 ^{OT}	6–4	Gallagher Center (1,276); Lewiston, NY
Dec 11, 2019*; 7:00 pm		Cornell	W 66–58	7–4	Cotterell Court (876); Hamilton, NY
Dec 14, 2019*; 7:00 pm, FSOH		at Cincinnati	W 67–66	8–4	Fifth Third Arena (10,416); Cincinnati, OH
Dec 22, 2019*; 7:00 pm		Columbia	W 89–71	9–4	Cotterell Court (741); Hamilton, NY
Patriot League regular season
Jan 2, 2020; 7:00 pm		American	W 65–51	10–4 (1–0)	Cotterell Court (854); Hamilton, NY
Jan 6, 2020; 7:00 pm, CBSSN		at Army	W 70–65	11–4 (2–0)	Christl Arena (814); West Point, NY
Jan 8, 2020; 7:00 pm		Loyola (MD)	W 92–70	12–4 (3–0)	Cotterell Court (710); Hamilton, NY
Jan 11, 2020; 4:00 pm		at Navy	W 70–63	13–4 (4–0)	Alumni Hall (1,516); Annapolis, MD
Jan 15, 2020; 11:00:00 am		at Lafayette	L 67–71	13–5 (4–1)	Kirby Sports Center (2,544); Easton, PA
Jan 18, 2020; 2:00 pm		Boston University	W 79–70	14–5 (5–1)	Cotterell Court (901); Hamilton, NY
Jan 20, 2020; 7:00 pm, CBSSN		Bucknell	W 80–65	15–5 (6–1)	Cotterell Court (1,315); Hamilton, NY
Jan 25, 2020; 2:00 pm		at American	W 79–69	16–5 (7–1)	Bender Arena (1,214); Washington, D.C.
Jan 29, 2020; 7:00 pm		Lafayette	L 78–80	16–6 (7–2)	Cotterell Court (930); Hamilton, NY
Feb 1, 2020; 2:00 pm, CBSSN		at Holy Cross	W 73–64	17–6 (8–2)	Hart Center (1,629); Worcester, MA
Feb 5, 2020; 7:00 pm		at Lehigh	W 81–51	18–6 (9–2)	Stabler Arena (654); Bethlehem, PA
Feb 8, 2020; 2:00 pm		Navy	W 67–60	19–6 (10–2)	Cotterell Court (1,026); Hamilton, NY
Feb 10, 2020; 7:00 pm, CBSSN		at Boston University	W 79–63	20–6 (11–2)	Case Gym (656); Boston, MA
Feb 16, 2020; 2:00 pm		at Loyola (MD)	L 80–84	20–7 (11–3)	Reitz Arena (878); Baltimore, MD
Feb 19, 2020; 7:00 pm, Stadium		Lehigh	W 70–67	21–7 (12–3)	Cotterell Court (1,776); Hamilton, NY
Feb 23, 2020; 2:00 pm		Holy Cross	W 90–60	22−7 (13−3)	Cotterell Court (985); Hamilton, NY
Feb 26, 2020; 7:00 pm		at Bucknell	L 70–71	22–8 (13–4)	Sojka Pavilion (2,497); Lewisburg, PA
Feb 29, 2020; 12:00 pm, CBSSN		Army	W 91–65	23–8 (14–4)	Cotterell Court (1,750); Hamilton, NY
Patriot League tournament
Mar 5, 2020; 7:00 pm, PLN	(1)	(8) Lehigh; Quarterfinals	W 83–70	24–8	Cotterell Court (1,368); Hamilton, NY
Mar 8, 2020; 2:00 pm, CBSSN	(1)	(5) Lafayette; Semifinals	W 89–64	25–8	Cotterell Court (1,834); Hamilton, NY
Mar 11, 2020; 7:30 pm, CBSSN	(1)	(3) Boston University; Championship game	L 61–64	25–9	Cotterell Court (1,724); Hamilton, NY
*Non-conference game. ^{#}Rankings from AP Poll. (#) Tournament seedings in parentheses. S=South; Source. All times are in Eastern Time.
