= 2020 National Invitation Tournament =

Annual NCAA basketball competition

- Season: 2019–20
- Teams: 32
- Finals site: Madison Square Garden, New York City

The 2020 National Invitational Tournament was to be a single-elimination tournament of 32 NCAA Division I men's college basketball teams not been selected to participate in the 2020 NCAA tournament. The tournament was to begin on March 17 and end on April 2. The first three rounds were to be played on campuses, with the semifinal and championship final played at Madison Square Garden in New York City.

On March 12, the NCAA canceled the tournament, along with all winter and spring championships for 2020 as a precaution with the coronavirus pandemic.

== Participants ==
=== Automatic qualifiers ===
The following teams were guaranteed berths into the 2020 NIT field by having the best regular season record in their conference, but failing to win their conference tournament. Some of these teams would have been eligible to receive an at-large berth into the NCAA tournament; for instance, San Diego State was likely to be an at-large NCAA team based on their record and polling ranking regardless of their loss in their conference final.

Although Merrimack won the Northeast Conference regular-season title in their first season within the NEC, they were ineligible to play in their conference tourney or in the NCAA tournament or NIT due to their transition to Division I. As a result, no team from the NEC was eligible for an auto-bid regardless of the result of the conference tournament.

Team	Conference	Overall record	Appearance	Last bid
~~Radford~~	~~Big South~~	~~21–11~~	~~1st~~	~~Never~~
~~Wright State~~	~~Horizon~~	~~25–6~~	~~2nd~~	~~2019~~
~~Northern Iowa~~	~~Missouri Valley~~	~~25–6~~	~~2nd~~	~~2012~~
~~San Diego State~~	~~Mountain West~~	~~30–2~~	~~7th~~	~~2016~~
~~Colgate~~	~~Patriot League~~	~~25–9~~	~~1st~~	~~Never~~

== Bracket ==
The field of 32 teams was to be announced on March 15 on ESPNU.

== Media ==
ESPN, Inc. was to have exclusive television rights to all of the NIT Games, broadcast across ESPN, ESPN2, ESPNU, and ESPN3. Westwood One was to have exclusive radio rights to the semifinals and the championship.

== See also ==
- 2020 Women's National Invitation Tournament
