= 2020 ACC men's basketball tournament =

- 2020 ACC Tournament logo
- Classification: Division I
- Season: 2019–20
- Teams: 14
- Site: Greensboro Coliseum; Greensboro, North Carolina
- Champions: Tournament canceled
- Television: ESPN, ESPN2, ACCN

2019–20 ACC men's basketball standings
	Conf.				Overall
Team	W		L	PCT	W		L	PCT
No. 4 Florida State	16	–	4	.800	26	–	5	.839
No. 16 Virginia	15	–	5	.750	23	–	7	.767
No. 14 Louisville	15	–	5	.750	24	–	7	.774
No. 11 Duke	15	–	5	.750	25	–	6	.806
Georgia Tech*	11	–	9	.550	17	–	14	.548
NC State	10	–	10	.500	20	–	12	.625
Syracuse	10	–	10	.500	18	–	14	.563
Notre Dame	10	–	10	.500	20	–	12	.625
Clemson	9	–	11	.450	16	–	15	.516
Miami (FL)	7	–	13	.350	15	–	16	.484
Boston College	7	–	13	.350	13	–	18	.419
Virginia Tech	7	–	13	.350	16	–	16	.500
Wake Forest	6	–	14	.300	13	–	18	.419
Pittsburgh	6	–	14	.300	16	–	17	.485
North Carolina	6	–	14	.300	14	–	19	.424
*Ineligible for postseason due to NCAA violations. Note: The 2020 ACC tournament was cancelled before the quarterfinals due to the COVID-19 pandemic. Rankings from AP poll

The 2020 ACC men's basketball tournament presented by New York Life was the postseason men's basketball tournament for the Atlantic Coast Conference and was held at the Greensboro Coliseum in Greensboro, North Carolina, from March 10 to 11, 2020. It was the 67th annual edition of the tournament.

This was the first edition of the tournament to not be available free-to-air at all, as the syndicated ACC package was shut down in favor of the launch of the cable-only ACCN, which exclusively carried the first round of the tournament, with the ESPN networks carrying the remainder of the tournament.

Due to ongoing concerns with the COVID-19 pandemic, officials announced that, initially, the tournament would only be played in front of essential tournament personnel, limited school administrators and student-athlete guests, broadcast television, and credentialed media members present, starting with the quarterfinals; however, shortly before the tipoff of the quarterfinal matchup between Florida State and Clemson, the ACC announced the tournament was canceled and Florida State, the regular season champions, would receive the conference's automatic bid to the NCAA tournament, though that decision became moot with the NCAA Tournament's cancellation later the same day. Florida State was awarded the conference championship along with the trophy for the 2020 tournament.

== Seeds ==
Fourteen of the 15 ACC teams would have participated in the tournament; the other team, Georgia Tech, was banned from postseason play, including the conference tournament, due to NCAA rules violations. Teams were seeded by record within the conference, with a tiebreaker system to seed teams with identical conference records. The top four seeds received double byes, while seeds 5 through 10 received single byes. Ultimately, the tournament being canceled shortly before the quarterfinal games were to have begun resulted in the top four seeds not playing at all.

Seed	School	Conference Record	Tiebreaker 1	Tiebreaker 2	Tiebreaker 3	Tiebreaker 4
1	Florida State	16–4				
2	Virginia	15–5	2–1 vs Duke/Louisville	1–1 vs Louisville	1–1 vs Florida State	
3	Louisville	15–5	2–1 vs Duke/Virginia	1–1 vs Virginia	0–2 vs Florida State	
4	Duke	15–5	0–2 vs Louisville/Virginia			
5	NC State	10–10	2–0 vs Notre Dame/Syracuse			
6	Syracuse	10–10	1–2 vs NC State/Notre Dame	1–1 vs Notre Dame	0–1 vs Florida State	1–3 vs Virginia/Louisville/Duke
7	Notre Dame	10–10	1–2 vs NC State/Syracuse	1–1 vs Syracuse	0–2 vs Florida State	0–3 vs Virginia/Louisville/Duke
8	Clemson	9–11				
9	Miami	7–13	3–0 vs Boston College/Virginia Tech			
10	Boston College	7–13	2–1 vs Miami/Virginia Tech			
11	Virginia Tech	7–13	0–4 vs Miami/Boston College			
12	Wake Forest	6–14	2–1 vs North Carolina/Pittsburgh	1–0 vs Pittsburgh		
13	Pittsburgh	6–14	2–1 vs North Carolina/Wake Forest	0–1 vs Wake Forest		
14	North Carolina	6–14	1–3 vs Pittsburgh/Wake Forest			

== Schedule ==
Session	Game	Time	Matchup	Score	Television	Attendance
First round – Tuesday, March 10
Opening day	1	4:30 pm	No. 12 Wake Forest vs No. 13 Pittsburgh	72–81	ACCN	13,310
Opening day	2	7:00 pm	No. 11 Virginia Tech vs No. 14 North Carolina	56–78	ACCN	13,310
Second round – Wednesday, March 11
1	3	12:00 pm	No. 8 Clemson vs No. 9 Miami	69–64	ESPN	n/a
1	4	2:00 pm*	No. 5 NC State vs No. 13 Pittsburgh	73–58	ESPN	n/a
2	5	7:00 pm	No. 7 Notre Dame vs No. 10 Boston College	80–58	ESPN2	20,809
2	6	9:00 pm*	No. 6 Syracuse vs No. 14 North Carolina	81–53	ESPN2	20,809
~~Quarterfinals – Thursday, March 12~~
3	7	~~12:30 pm~~	~~No. 1 Florida State vs No. 8 Clemson~~	canceled	~~ESPN~~	
3	8	~~2:30 pm*~~	~~No. 4 Duke vs No. 5 NC State~~	canceled	~~ESPN~~	
4	9	~~7:00 pm~~	~~No. 2 Virginia vs No. 7 Notre Dame~~	canceled	~~ESPN~~	
4	10	~~9:00 pm*~~	~~No. 3 Louisville vs No. 6 Syracuse~~	canceled	~~ESPN~~	
~~Semifinals – Friday, March 13~~
5	11	~~7:00 pm~~	~~Florida State/Clemson vs Duke/NC State~~	canceled	~~ESPN~~	
5	12	~~9:00 pm*~~	~~Virginia/Notre Dame vs Louisville/Syracuse~~	canceled	~~ESPN~~	
~~Championship – Saturday, March 14~~
6	13	~~8:30 pm~~	~~Winner of game 11 vs Winner of game 12~~	canceled	~~ESPN~~	
*Denotes approximate time. Game times in EDT. Rankings denote tournament seed.

== Bracket ==
First round Tuesday, March 10; ACCN
12	Wake Forest	72
13	Pittsburgh	81
11	Virginia Tech	56
14	North Carolina	78

Second round Wednesday, March 11; ESPN/ESPN2
8	Clemson	69
9	Miami	64
5	NC State	73
13	Pittsburgh	58
7	Notre Dame	80
10	Boston College	58
6	Syracuse	81
14	North Carolina	53

~~Quarterfinals~~; ~~Thursday, March 12~~; ~~ESPN~~
1	~~Florida State~~
8	~~Clemson~~
4	~~Duke~~
5	~~NC State~~
2	~~Virginia~~
7	~~Notre Dame~~
3	~~Louisville~~
6	~~Syracuse~~

~~Semifinals~~; ~~Friday, March 13~~; ~~ESPN~~
Canceled due to
COVID-19 pandemic
Canceled due to
COVID-19 pandemic

~~Championship~~; ~~Saturday, March 14~~; ~~ESPN~~
Canceled due to
COVID-19 pandemic

== Game summaries ==
=== First round ===
ACCN

March 10
4:30 p.m.

Report

No. 12 Wake Forest 72, No. 13 Pittsburgh 81
Scoring by half: 41–40, 31–41
Pts: Sarr (20); Rebs: Sarr (13); Asts: Neath (6)	Pts: Champagnie (31); Rebs: Coulibaly (7); Asts: Johnson (8)

Greensboro Coliseum
Greensboro, NC
Attendance: 13,310
Referees: Tony Henderson, Jerry Heater, Lee Cassell

ACCN

March 10
7:00 p.m.

Report

No. 11 Virginia Tech 56, No. 14 North Carolina 78
Scoring by half: 26–32, 30–46
Pts: Cattoor (14); Rebs: Ojiako (7); Asts: Bede (5)	Pts: Brooks (20); Rebs: Bacot (11); Asts: Anthony/Black (4)

Greensboro Coliseum
Greensboro, NC
Attendance: 13,310
Referees: Mark Schnur, Raymond Styons, Burt Smith

=== Second round ===
ESPN

March 11
12:00 p.m.

Report

No. 8 Clemson 69, No. 9 Miami 64
Scoring by half: 21–23, 48–41
Pts: Dawes (18); Rebs: Simms (10); Asts: Simms (4)	Pts: Lykes (21); Rebs: Waardenburg (8); Asts: Wong (3)

Greensboro Coliseum
Greensboro, NC
Referees: Ron Groover, Brian Dorsey, Mark Schnur

ESPN

March 11
2:00 p.m.

Report

No. 5 NC State 73, No. 13 Pittsburgh 58
Scoring by half: 35–32, 38–26
Pts: Daniels (23); Rebs: Bryce (10); Asts: Johnson (11)	Pts: Johnson (15); Rebs: Hamilton (9); Asts: McGowens (3)

Greensboro Coliseum
Greensboro, NC
Referees: Roger Ayers, Jamie Luckie, Clarence Armstrong

ESPN2

March 11
7:00 p.m.

Report

No. 7 Notre Dame 80, No. 10 Boston College 58
Scoring by half: 36–21, 44–37
Pts: Gibbs (16); Rebs: Mooney (11); Asts: Hubb (9)	Pts: Mitchell (20); Rebs: Mitchell (13); Asts: Heath (4)

Greensboro Coliseum
Greensboro, NC
Attendance: 20,809
Referees: Mike Eades, Tony Henderson, Jerry Heater

ESPN2

March 11
9:00 p.m.

Report

No. 6 Syracuse 81, No. 14 North Carolina 53
Scoring by half: 43–22, 38–31
Pts: Hughes (27); Rebs: Sidibe (13); Asts: Girard III (8)	Pts: Brooks (18); Rebs: Bacot (7); Asts: Bacot/Anthony (3)

Greensboro Coliseum
Greensboro, NC
Attendance: 20,809
Referees: Ted Valentine, Bill Covington, AJ Desai

=== Quarterfinals ===
ESPN

March 12
12:30 p.m.

Not played

No. 1 Florida State vs. No. 8 Clemson
Canceled due to COVID-19 pandemic.

Greensboro Coliseum
Greensboro, NC

ESPN

March 12
2:30 p.m.

Not played

No. 4 Duke vs. No. 5 NC State
Canceled due to COVID-19 pandemic.

Greensboro Coliseum
Greensboro, NC

ESPN

March 12
7:00 p.m.

Not played

No. 2 Virginia vs. No. 7 Notre Dame
Canceled due to COVID-19 pandemic.

Greensboro Coliseum
Greensboro, NC

ESPN

March 12
9:00 p.m.

Not played

No. 3 Louisville vs. No. 6 Syracuse
Canceled due to COVID-19 pandemic.

Greensboro Coliseum
Greensboro, NC

=== Semifinals ===
ESPN

March 13
7:00 p.m.

Not played

Greensboro Coliseum
Greensboro, NC

ESPN

March 13
9:00 p.m.

Not played

Greensboro Coliseum
Greensboro, NC

=== Final ===
ESPN

March 14
8:30 p.m.

Not played

Greensboro Coliseum
Greensboro, NC

== Awards and honors ==
Tournament MVP: not awarded

All-Tournament Teams: not awarded

First Team
- not awarded

Second Team
- not awarded

== See also ==
- 2020 ACC women's basketball tournament
