= 2019–20 Atlantic Coast Conference men's basketball season =

- League: NCAA Division I
- Sport: Basketball
- Teams: 15
- TV partner(s): ACC Network, ESPN, Regional Sports Networks

NBA Draft
- Top draft pick: Patrick Williams, Florida State
- Picked by: Chicago Bulls, 4th overall

2019–20 NCAA Division I men's basketball season
- Regular season Champions: Florida State
- Runners-up: Virginia
- Season MVP: Tre Jones, Duke

ACC tournament

Atlantic Coast Conference men's basketball seasons
- ← 2018–19 2020–21 →

2019–20 ACC men's basketball standings
	Conf.				Overall
Team	W		L	PCT	W		L	PCT
No. 4 Florida State	16	–	4	.800	26	–	5	.839
No. 16 Virginia	15	–	5	.750	23	–	7	.767
No. 14 Louisville	15	–	5	.750	24	–	7	.774
No. 11 Duke	15	–	5	.750	25	–	6	.806
Georgia Tech*	11	–	9	.550	17	–	14	.548
NC State	10	–	10	.500	20	–	12	.625
Syracuse	10	–	10	.500	18	–	14	.563
Notre Dame	10	–	10	.500	20	–	12	.625
Clemson	9	–	11	.450	16	–	15	.516
Miami (FL)	7	–	13	.350	15	–	16	.484
Boston College	7	–	13	.350	13	–	18	.419
Virginia Tech	7	–	13	.350	16	–	16	.500
Wake Forest	6	–	14	.300	13	–	18	.419
Pittsburgh	6	–	14	.300	16	–	17	.485
North Carolina	6	–	14	.300	14	–	19	.424
*Ineligible for postseason due to NCAA violations. Note: The 2020 ACC tournament was cancelled before the quarterfinals due to the COVID-19 pandemic. Rankings from AP poll

The 2019–20 Atlantic Coast Conference men's basketball season began with practices in October 2019, followed by the start of the 2019–20 NCAA Division I men's basketball season in November. Conference play started in late December 2019 and concluded in March with the 2020 ACC men's basketball tournament at the Greensboro Coliseum in Greensboro, North Carolina. The season marks 66th season of Atlantic Coast Conference basketball.

The post season was cut short due to the COVID-19 outbreak. On March 12, the NCAA announced the tournament would be cancelled, along with all remaining winter and spring championships. The ACC tournament was cancelled after the second round and the NCAA tournament and NIT were both cancelled before they began.

== Head coaches ==
=== Coaching change ===
- In April, 2019, Virginia Tech head coach Buzz Williams accepted the head coaching job with Texas A&M. On April 7, 2019, the school hired Wofford head coach Mike Young as the new Virginia Tech head coach.

=== Coaches ===
Team	Head coach	Previous job	Years at school	Record at school	ACC record	ACC titles	NCAA tournaments	NCAA Final Fours	NCAA Championships
Boston College	Jim Christian	Ohio	6	62–100	18–72	0	0	0	0
Clemson	Brad Brownell	Wright State	10	169–127	76–82	0	6	0	0
Duke	Mike Krzyzewski	Army	40	1,059–285	426–175	16	35	12	5
Florida State	Leonard Hamilton	Washington Wizards	18	354–216	148–138	1	10	0	0
Georgia Tech	Josh Pastner	Memphis	4	48–53	20–34	0	0	0	0
Louisville	Chris Mack	Xavier	2	20–14	10–8	0	1	0	0
Miami	Jim Larrañaga	George Mason	9	175–97	80–62	1	4	1	0
NC State	Kevin Keatts	UNC Wilmington	3	45–24	20–16	0	1	0	0
North Carolina	Roy Williams	Kansas	17	453–133	196–74	3	15	8	3
Notre Dame	Mike Brey	Delaware	20	412–205	187–122	1	12	0	0
Pittsburgh	Jeff Capel	Duke (Assistant)	2	14–19	3–15	0	0	0	0
Syracuse	Jim Boeheim	Syracuse (Assistant)	43	946–385	394–237	0	31	4	1
Virginia	Tony Bennett	Washington State	11	254–89	121–53	2	7	1	1
Virginia Tech	Mike Young	Wofford	1	0–0	0–0	0	0	0	0
Wake Forest	Danny Manning	Tulsa	6	65–93	24–66	0	1	0	0

Notes:

- Year at school includes 2019–20 season.
- Overall and ACC records are from time at current school and are through the end the 2018–19 season.
- NCAA tournament appearances are from time at current school only.
- NCAA Final Fours and Championship include time at other schools

== Preseason ==
=== Preseason watchlists ===
Below is a table of notable preseason watch lists.

Wooden	Naismith	Cousy	West	Erving	Malone	Abdul-Jabbar	Olson
Cole Anthony – North Carolina; Vernon Carey Jr. – Duke; Mamadi Diakite – Virginia; Tre Jones – Duke; Jordan Nwora – Louisville	Jordan Nwora – Louisville; Cole Anthony – North Carolina; Vernon Carey Jr. – Duke; Mamadi Diakite – Virginia; Markell Johnson – NC State; Tre Jones – Duke; John Mooney – Notre Dame	Tre Jones – Duke; Trent Forrest – Florida State; Cole Anthony – North Carolina; Kihei Clark – Virginia	T. J. Gibbs – Notre Dame	Matthew Hurt – Duke; Jordan Nwora – Louisville; Elijah Hughes – Syracuse	Garrison Brooks – North Carolina; John Mooney – Notre Dame; Mamadi Diakite – Virginia	Vernon Carey Jr. – Duke; Steven Enoch – Louisville; Armando Bacot – North Carolina	Cole Anthony – North Carolina; Vernon Carey Jr. – Duke; Tre Jones – Duke; John Mooney – Notre Dame; Jordan Nwora – Louisville

=== Preseason polls ===
	AP	Athlon; Sports	Bleacher; Report	Blue Ribbon; Yearbook	CBS Sports	Coaches	ESPN	KenPom	NBC Sports	SBNation	Sports; Illustrated
Boston College					95			119			93
Clemson					77			79			92
Duke	4	4	5	4	10	4	6	4	6	2	4
Florida State	RV		18		42	RV		14			38
Georgia Tech					89			66			77
Louisville	5	6	8	6	9	5	5	3	4	6	3
Miami					51			65			72
North Carolina	9	7	14	12	4	11	8	6	14	11	6
NC State	RV		16		30	RV		28			19
Notre Dame	RV				26			42			40
Pittsburgh					53			67			78
Syracuse	RV				58	RV		51			66
Virginia	11	15	2	9	7	9	16	5	10	8	11
Virginia Tech					104			54			126
Wake Forest					60			80			96

=== ACC Preseason Media Poll ===
The ACC Men's Basketball media preseason poll was released at Operation Basketball, hosted at the Charlotte Marriott City Center in Charlotte, North Carolina on October 8, 2019. Two members of each team, in addition to the team's head coaches were in attendance. The preseason poll and preseason All-ACC Teams were voted on at Operation Basketball. The results of the voting is shown below.

==== Preseason poll ====
First place votes shown in parentheses.

1. Duke (51)– 1,564
2. North Carolina (19) – 1,493
3. Louisville (29) – 1,448
4. Virginia (12) – 1,405
5. Florida State – 1,157
6. NC State – 1,038
7. Notre Dame – 915
8. Syracuse – 910
9. Miami – 768
10. Pittsburgh – 577
11. Clemson – 564
12. Georgia Tech – 437
13. Boston College – 382
14. Virginia Tech – 334
15. Wake Forest – 328

==== Preseason All-ACC teams ====
2019 ACC Men's Basketball Preseason All-ACC Teams
First Team	Second Team
Jordan Nwora – Louisville; Tre Jones – Duke; Cole Anthony – North Carolina; John Mooney – Notre Dame; Mamadi Diakite – Virginia	Markell Johnson – NC State; Vernon Carey Jr. – Duke; Chris Lykes – Miami; Garrison Brooks – North Carolina; Trent Forrest – Florida State

==== ACC preseason player of the year ====
- Jordan Nwora – Louisville (55)
- Cole Anthony – North Carolina (31)
- Tre Jones – Duke (19)
- John Mooney – Notre Dame (3)
- Mamadi Diakite – Virginia (2)
- Markell Johnson – NC State (1)

==== ACC preseason rookie of the year ====
- Cole Anthony – North Carolina (89)
- Vernon Carey Jr. – Duke (8)
- Wendell Moore Jr. – Duke (5)
- Casey Morsell – Virginia (3)
- Cassius Stanley – Duke (3)
- Matthew Hurt – Duke (3)

== Regular season ==
=== Rankings ===
Legend
Increase in ranking
Decrease in ranking
Not ranked previous week
First Place votes shown in ()

		Pre	Wk 2	Wk 3	Wk 4	Wk 5	Wk 6	Wk 7	Wk 8	Wk 9	Wk 10	Wk 11	Wk 12	Wk 13	Wk 14	Wk 15	Wk 16	Wk 17	Wk 18	Wk 19	Final
Boston College	AP																				
Boston College	C																				N/A
Clemson	AP																				
Clemson	C																				N/A
Duke	AP	4	2	1 (52)	1 (53)	9	7	4 (2)	4 (1)	2 (1)	2 (9)	3 (4)	8	9	7	7	6	7	12	10	11
Duke	C	4	1 (25)	1 (27)	8	5	3 (2)	3	2 (1)	2 (4)	3 (6)	8	8	7	7	6	7	11	10	8	N/A
Florida State	AP	RV	RV	RV	RV	17	21	19	17	18	10	9	5	5	8	8	8	6	7	4	4
Florida State	C	RV	RV	RV	19	21	19	17	20	10	9	6	6	8	8	8	6	8	4	5	N/A
Georgia Tech	AP																				
Georgia Tech	C																				N/A
Louisville	AP	5	4 (1)	2 (8)	2 (7)	1 (48)	1 (55)	3 (1)	3 (1)	7	13	11	6	6	5	5	11	11	10	15	14
Louisville	C	5	2 (5)	2 (1)	1 (25)	1 (28)	5	4 (2)	8	11	10	5	5	5	5	11	10	10	14	13	N/A
Miami	AP																				
Miami	C																				N/A
North Carolina	AP	9	6	5	6	7	17	RV													
North Carolina	C	11	4	4	7	16	23	RV	RV												N/A
NC State	AP	RV																			
NC State	C	RV					RV														N/A
Notre Dame	AP	RV				RV															
Notre Dame	C																				N/A
Pittsburgh	AP																				
Pittsburgh	C																				N/A
Syracuse	AP	RV																			
Syracuse	C	RV	RV																		N/A
Virginia	AP	11	9	7	7	5 (5)	9	9	16	19	18	RV	RV		RV	RV	RV	RV	22	17	16
Virginia	C	9	6	6	2 (2)	8	7	13	19	18	RV	RV		RV		RV	RV	22т	18	17	N/A
Virginia Tech	AP			RV				RV	RV	RV		RV									
Virginia Tech	C																				N/A
Wake Forest	AP																				
Wake Forest	C																				N/A

Notes:
The week 2 Coaches Poll was released on the same date as the week 3 AP poll. No Coaches poll was released on the date when the week 2 AP Poll was released.
The AP poll does not release a final poll after the NCAA tournament, where as the Coaches Poll does.
Due to the cancellation of the NCAA and NIT Tournaments, the Coaches Poll did not release a final poll.

=== Conference matrix ===
This table summarizes the head-to-head results between teams in conference play. Each team will play 20 conference games, and at least 1 against each opponent. The 2019–2020 season marked the first year that the ACC played a 20-game conference slate.

	Boston College	Clemson	Duke	Florida State	Georgia Tech	Louisville	Miami	North Carolina	NC State	Notre Dame	Pittsburgh	Syracuse	Virginia	Virginia Tech	Wake Forest
vs. Boston College	–	1–0	2–0	1–0	1–0	1–0	1–0	0–1	0–1	1–1	1–0	2–0	1–1	0–2	1–1
vs. Clemson	0–1	–	0–1	1–1	2–0	1–1	1–0	0–1	1–1	1–0	0–1	0–1	1–0	2–0	1–1
vs. Duke	0–2	1–0	–	0–1	0–1	1–0	0–2	0–2	1–1	0–1	0–1	0–1	1–0	0–2	1–1
vs. Florida State	0–1	1–1	1–0	–	0–1	0–2	0–2	0–1	0–1	0–2	1–1	0–1	1–1	0–1	0–1
vs. Georgia Tech	0–1	0–2	1–0	1–0	–	1–1	0–1	0–1	0–2	2–0	1–1	2–0	1–0	0–1	0–1
vs. Louisville	0–1	1–1	0–1	2–0	1–1	–	0–2	0–1	0–1	0–1	0–2	0–1	1–1	0–1	0–1
vs. Miami	0–1	0–1	2–0	2–0	1–0	2–0	–	1–0	2–0	1–0	1–1	0–1	1–0	0–2	0–1
vs. North Carolina	1–0	1–0	2–0	1–0	1–0	1–0	0–1	–	0–2	0–2	2–0	0–1	2–0	1–0	1–1
vs. NC State	1–0	1–1	1–1	1–0	2–0	1–0	0–2	2–0	–	0–1	0–1	0–1	0–1	1–0	0–2
vs. Notre Dame	1–1	0–1	1–0	2–0	0–2	1–0	0–1	2–0	1–0	–	0–1	1–1	1–0	0–1	1–1
vs. Pittsburgh	0–1	1–0	1–0	1–1	1–1	2–0	1–1	0–2	1–0	1–0	–	2–0	1–0	1–0	1–0
vs. Syracuse	0–2	1–0	1–0	1–0	0–2	1–0	1–0	1–0	1–0	1–1	0–2	–	1–1	1–1	0–1
vs. Virginia	1–1	0–1	0–1	1–1	0–1	1–1	0–1	0–2	1–0	0–1	0–1	1–1	–	0–2	0–1
vs. Virginia Tech	2–0	0–2	2–0	1–0	1–0	1–0	2–0	0–1	0–1	1–0	0–1	1–1	2–0	–	0–1
vs. Wake Forest	1–1	1–1	1–1	1–0	1–0	1–0	1–0	1–1	2–0	1–1	0–1	1–0	1–0	1–0	–
Total	7–13	9–11	15–5	16–4	11–9	15–5	7–13	6–14	10–10	10–10	6–14	10–10	15–5	7–13	6–14

=== Player of the week ===
Throughout the conference regular season, the Atlantic Coast Conference offices named one or two Players of the week and one or two Rookies of the week.

Week	Player of the week	Rookie of the week	Reference
Week 1 – Nov 11	Cole Anthony – North Carolina	Cole Anthony – North Carolina	
Week 2 - Nov 18	John Mooney – Notre Dame	Landers Nolley II – Virginia Tech	
Week 3 - Nov 25	Michael Devoe – Georgia Tech	Vernon Carey Jr. – Duke	
Week 3 - Nov 25	Vernon Carey Jr. – Duke	Vernon Carey Jr. – Duke	
Week 4 - Dec 2	Olivier Sarr – Wake Forest	Landers Nolley II (2) – Virginia Tech	
Week 5 – Dec 9	Jordan Nwora – Louisville	Vernon Carey Jr. (2) – Duke	
Week 5 – Dec 9	Tre Jones – Duke	Vernon Carey Jr. (2) – Duke	
Week 5 - Dec 16	Chaundee Brown – Wake Forest	Landers Nolley II (3) – Virginia Tech	
Week 6 - Dec 23	Markell Johnson – NC State	Vernon Carey Jr. (3) – Duke	
Week 6 - Dec 23	Kameron McGusty – Miami	Vernon Carey Jr. (3) – Duke	
Week 7 - Dec 30	Moses Wright – Georgia Tech	Landers Nolley II (4) – Virginia Tech	
Week 8 - Jan 6	John Mooney (2) – Notre Dame	Matthew Hurt – Duke	
Week 9 – Jan 13	Tre Jones (2) – Duke	Landers Nolley II (5) – Virginia Tech	
Week 9 – Jan 13	Aamir Simms – Clemson	Landers Nolley II (5) – Virginia Tech	
Week 10 – Jan 20	Devin Vassell – Florida State	David Johnson – Louisville	
Week 10 – Jan 20	Buddy Boeheim – Syracuse	David Johnson – Louisville	
Week 11 – Jan 27	Jose Alvarado – Georgia Tech	Justin Champagnie – Pittsburgh	
Week 12 – Feb 3	Vernon Carey Jr. (2) – Duke	Vernon Carey Jr. (4) – Duke	
Week 13 – Feb 10	Tre Jones (3) – Duke	Justin Champagnie (2) – Pittsburgh	
Week 14 – Feb 17	Mamadi Diakite – Virginia	Isaiah Wong – Miami	
Week 15 – Feb 24	Devon Daniels – NC State	Isaiah Wong (2) – Miami	
Week 16 – Mar 2	Olivier Sarr (2) – Wake Forest	Cole Anthony (2) – North Carolina	
Week 17 – Mar 9	Mamadi Diakite (2) – Virginia	Vernon Carey Jr. (5) – Duke	

=== Records against other conferences ===
2019–20 records against non-conference foes through games played on December 30, 2019. Records shown for regular season only.

Power 7 Conferences	Record
American	4–2
Big East	2–2
Big Ten	9–11
Big 12	3–3
Pac-12	6–2
SEC	3–8
Power 7 Total	27–28
Other NCAA Division I Conferences	Record
American East	5–0
A-10	2–3
ASUN	4–0
Big Sky	1–0
Big South	9–0
Big West	2–0
CAA	4–0
C-USA	3–1
Horizon League	5–0
Ivy League	5–1
MAAC	4–0
MAC	4–1
MEAC	8–0
MVC	2–0
Mountain West	2–0
NEC	6–0
OVC	1–1
Patriot League	5–0
Pacific West	0–0
SoCon	7–1
Southland	2–1
SWAC	5–0
The Summit	0–0
Sun Belt	3–0
WAC	2–0
WCC	0–2
Other Division I Total	92–11
NCAA Division I Total	120–38

== Postseason ==
=== ACC tournament ===
Due to ongoing concerns with the COVID-19 pandemic, officials announced that, initially, the tournament would only be played in front of essential tournament personnel, limited school administrators and student-athlete guests, broadcast television, and credentialed media members present, starting with the quarterfinals; however, shortly before the tipoff of the quarterfinal matchup between Florida State and Clemson, the ACC announced the tournament was canceled and Florida State, the regular season champions, would receive the conference's automatic bid to the NCAA tournament.

First round Tuesday, March 10; ACCN
12	Wake Forest	72
13	Pittsburgh	81
11	Virginia Tech	56
14	North Carolina	78

Second round Wednesday, March 11; ESPN/ESPN2
8	Clemson	69
9	Miami (FL)	64
5	NC State	73
13	Pittsburgh	58
7	Notre Dame	80
10	Boston College	58
6	Syracuse	81
14	North Carolina	53

Quarterfinals; Thursday, March 12; ESPN
1	Florida State
8	Clemson
4	Duke
5	NC State
2	Virginia
7	Notre Dame
3	Louisville
6	Syracuse

Semifinals; Friday, March 13; ESPN

Championship; Saturday, March 14; ESPN

== Honors and awards ==
=== All-Americans ===
Consensus All-Americans
First Team	Second Team
None	Vernon Carey Jr. – Duke

To earn "consensus" status, a player must win honors based on a point system computed from the four different all-America teams. The point system consists of three points for first team, two points for second team and one point for third team. No honorable mention or fourth team or lower are used in the computation. The top five totals plus ties are first team and the next five plus ties are second team.

Associated Press	NABC	Sporting News	USBWA
First Team
None	None	None	None
Second Team
Vernon Carey Jr. – Duke	None	Vernon Carey Jr. – Duke	Vernon Carey Jr. – Duke
Third Team
Tre Jones – Duke; Jordan Nwora – Louisville	Vernon Carey Jr. – Duke; Tre Jones – Duke; Jordan Nwora – Louisville	Jordan Nwora – Louisville	Tre Jones – Duke; Jordan Nwora – Louisville

=== ACC Awards ===
2020 ACC Men's Basketball Individual Awards
Award	Recipient(s)
Player of the Year	Tre Jones – Duke
Coach of the Year	Leonard Hamilton – Florida State
Defensive Player of the Year	Tre Jones – Duke
Freshman of the Year	Vernon Carey Jr. – Duke
Most Improved Player of the Year	Garrison Brooks – North Carolina
Sixth Man Award	Patrick Williams – Florida State

2020 ACC Men's Basketball All-Conference Teams
First Team	Second Team	Third Team	Honorable Mention
Vernon Carey Jr. – Duke; Jordan Nwora – Louisville; John Mooney – Notre Dame; Tre Jones – Duke; Elijah Hughes – Syracuse	Mamadi Diakite – Virginia; Devin Vassell – Florida State; Garrison Brooks – North Carolina; Trent Forrest – Florida State; Markell Johnson – NC State	Kihei Clark – Virginia; Jose Alvarado – Georgia Tech; Aamir Simms – Clemson; Cole Anthony – North Carolina; Olivier Sarr – Wake Forest	Landers Nolley II – Virginia Tech; Michael Devoe – Georgia Tech; Brandon Childress – Wake Forest; Chris Lykes – Miami; M. J. Walker – Florida State; Braxton Key – Virginia; Dwayne Sutton – Louisville; Steffon Mitchell – Boston College

2020 ACC Men's Basketball All-Freshman Team
Player	Team
Vernon Carey Jr.	Duke
Cassius Stanley	Duke
Cole Anthony	North Carolina
Landers Nolley II	Virginia Tech
Patrick Williams	Florida State

== NBA draft ==
The ACC had a total of eight players selected in the 2020 NBA Draft.

PG	Point guard	SG	Shooting guard	SF	Small forward	PF	Power forward	C	Center

Player	Team	Round	Pick #	Position	School
Patrick Williams	Chicago Bulls	1	4	SF	Florida State
Devin Vassell	San Antonio Spurs	1	11	SG	Florida State
Cole Anthony	Orlando Magic	1	15	PG	North Carolina
Vernon Carey Jr.	Charlotte Hornets	2	32	PF	Duke
Elijah Hughes	New Orleans Pelicans	2	39	SF	Syracuse
Tre Jones	San Antonio Spurs	2	41	PG	Duke
Jordan Nwora	Milwaukee Bucks	2	45	SF	Louisville
Cassius Stanley	Indiana Pacers	2	54	SG	Duke

== Attendance ==
Team	Arena	Capacity	Game 1	Game 2	Game 3	Game 4	Game 5	Game 6	Game 7	Game 8	Game 9	Game 10	Total	Average	% of Capacity
Team	Arena	Capacity	Game 11	Game 12	Game 13	Game 14	Game 15	Game 16	Game 17	Game 18	Game 19	Game 20	Total	Average	% of Capacity
Boston College	Conte Forum	8,606	4,815	4,710	5,540	4,133	4,560	4,265	4,004	3,874	3,963	5,781	97,527	5,418	62.96%
Boston College	Conte Forum	8,606	6,217	6,981	5,771	8,606	6,304	6,431	5,101	6,471			97,527	5,418	62.96%
Clemson	Littlejohn Coliseum	9,000	7,500	5,713	5,804	5,673	5,616	6,394	5,632	5,632	5,549	6,908	116,099	6,829	75.88%
Clemson	Littlejohn Coliseum	9,000	8,494	6,951	6,402	7,472	9,146	9,095	8,188				116,099	6,829	75.88%
Duke	Cameron Indoor Stadium	9,314	9,314	9,314	9,314	9,314	9,314	9,314	9,314	9,314	9,314	9,314	158,338	9,314	100%
Duke	Cameron Indoor Stadium	9,314	9,314	9,314	9,314	9,314	9,314	9,314	9,314				158,338	9,314	100%
Florida State	Donald L. Tucker Center	12,100	9,490	7,572	7,595	6,102	7,834	5,542	5,636	6,837	10,725	11,500	143,862	8,991	74.31%
Florida State	Donald L. Tucker Center	12,100	10,015	11,500	11,500	9,014	11,500	11,500					143,862	8,991	74.31%
Georgia Tech	McCamish Pavilion	8,600	4,624	6,547	4,552	5,133	5,743	4,203	8,600	5,899	7,314	6,794	90,260	5,641	65.60%
Georgia Tech	McCamish Pavilion	8,600	4,133	4,727	5,801	4,763	6,681	4,746					90,260	5,641	65.60%
Louisville	KFC Yum! Center	22,090	14,761	14,808	14,874	14,410	14,889	21,674	17,249	16,185	15,444	17,786	293,641	16,313	73.85%
Louisville	KFC Yum! Center	22,090	14,980	15,001	17,654	15,270	19,250	16,428	14,874	18,104			293,641	16,313	73.85%
Miami	Watsco Center	7,972	7,576	5,168	4,882	4,649	4,963	7,049	6,387	6,212	5,197	5,164	79,415	5,673	71.16%
Miami	Watsco Center	7,972	5,465	5,360	5,318	6,025							79,415	5,673	71.16%
North Carolina	Dean Smith Center	21,750	21,750	20,374	20,251	21,115	6,272	20,765	21,099	20,798	21,077	21,125	301,544	20,103	92.43%
North Carolina	Dean Smith Center	21,750	21,492	21,500	21,308	21,338	21,280						301,544	20,103	92.43%
NC State	PNC Arena	19,722	17,133	13,430	14,024	4,774	4,624	14,078	16,035	15,501	17,592	16,825	272,701	15,150	76.82%
NC State	PNC Arena	19,722	15,801	16,553	19,533	18,197	19,515	17,444	15,818	15,824			272,701	15,150	76.82%
Notre Dame	Edmund P. Joyce Center	9,149	6,422	6,190	7,831	5,752	6,555	6,166	7,117	6,441	8,083	8,181	137,218	7,222	78.94%
Notre Dame	Edmund P. Joyce Center	9,149	8,404	7,942	6,402	8,240	6,534	8,150	7,351	7,156	8,301		137,218	7,222	78.94%
Pittsburgh	Petersen Events Center	12,508	9,016	7,956	11,725	6,753	7,068	7,984	7,015	7,226	8,035	10,155	158,937	8,830	70.59%
Pittsburgh	Petersen Events Center	12,508	9,221	12,376	7,230	9,759	10,754	7,530	10,133	9,001			158,937	8,830	70.59%
Syracuse	Carrier Dome	35,446	22,518	21,218	21,487	21,123	17,181	20,844	16,394	17,537	18,125	19,821	389,500	21,639	61.05%
Syracuse	Carrier Dome	35,446	16,504	21,645	23,711	31,458	21,824	22,137	26,661	29,312			389,500	21,639	61.05%
Virginia	John Paul Jones Arena	14,593	13,524	13,736	13,913	14,109	14,629	13,665	14,409	14,399	14,629	14,133	239,531	14,090	96.55%
Virginia	John Paul Jones Arena	14,593	14,163	13,869	13,580	13,696	13,819	14,629	14,629				239,531	14,090	96.55%
Virginia Tech	Cassell Coliseum	10,052	9,275	8,536	9,900	8,421	9,275	8,348	9,275	7,446	7,642	9,275	160,372	8,910	88.63%
Virginia Tech	Cassell Coliseum	10,052	9,275	9,275	9,275	9,275	9,275	8,428	9,275	8,901			160,372	8,910	88.63%
Wake Forest	LJVM Coliseum	14,665	4,451	4,187	6,118	5,847	5,156	5,277	4,873	6,872	7,725	7,113	96,626	6,902	47.06%
Wake Forest	LJVM Coliseum	14,665	10,894	7,562	11,681	8,870							96,626	6,902	47.06%
