= 2019–20 Wake Forest Demon Deacons men's basketball team =

American college basketball season

2019–20 Wake Forest Demon Deacons men's basketball
- Conference: Atlantic Coast Conference
- Record: 13–18 (6–14 ACC)
- Head coach: Danny Manning (6th season)
- Assistant coaches: Randolph Childress; Rex Walters; Steve Woodberry
- Home arena: LJVM Coliseum

2019–20 ACC men's basketball standings
	Conf.				Overall
Team	W		L	PCT	W		L	PCT
No. 4 Florida State	16	–	4	.800	26	–	5	.839
No. 16 Virginia	15	–	5	.750	23	–	7	.767
No. 14 Louisville	15	–	5	.750	24	–	7	.774
No. 11 Duke	15	–	5	.750	25	–	6	.806
Georgia Tech*	11	–	9	.550	17	–	14	.548
NC State	10	–	10	.500	20	–	12	.625
Syracuse	10	–	10	.500	18	–	14	.563
Notre Dame	10	–	10	.500	20	–	12	.625
Clemson	9	–	11	.450	16	–	15	.516
Miami (FL)	7	–	13	.350	15	–	16	.484
Boston College	7	–	13	.350	13	–	18	.419
Virginia Tech	7	–	13	.350	16	–	16	.500
Wake Forest	6	–	14	.300	13	–	18	.419
Pittsburgh	6	–	14	.300	16	–	17	.485
North Carolina	6	–	14	.300	14	–	19	.424
*Ineligible for postseason due to NCAA violations. Note: The 2020 ACC tournament was cancelled before the quarterfinals due to the COVID-19 pandemic. Rankings from AP poll

The 2019–20 Wake Forest Demon Deacons men's basketball team represented Wake Forest University during the 2019–20 NCAA Division I men's basketball season. The Demon Deacons were led by sixth-year head coach Danny Manning and played their home games at the Lawrence Joel Veterans Memorial Coliseum in Winston-Salem, North Carolina as members of the Atlantic Coast Conference.

The Demon Deacons finished the season 13–17, and 6–14 in ACC play. They lost to Pittsburgh in the first round of the ACC tournament. The tournament was cancelled before the Quarterfinals due to the COVID-19 pandemic. The NCAA tournament and NIT were also cancelled due to the pandemic.

== Previous season ==
The Demon Deacons finished 2018–19 season 11–20, 4–14 in ACC play to finish in 13th place. They lost in the first round of the ACC tournament to Miami.

== Offseason ==
=== Departures ===
Name	Number	Pos.	Height	Weight	Year	Hometown	Reason for departure
Jaylen Hoard	10	F	6'8"	215	Freshman	Carnon, France	Declared for 2019 NBA draft
Melo Eggleston	11	G/F	6'8"	200	Sophomore	Suitland, MD	Transferred to Arkansas State
Jamie Lewis	25	G	6'3"	190	Freshman	Atlanta, GA	Transferred to Kennesaw State
Ikenna Smart	35	F	6'10"	240	RS Senior	Greensboro, NC	Graduated
Anthony Bilas	40	G	6'2'	160	Senior	Charlotte, NC	Walk-on; graduated
Aaron Spivey	41	G	6'2"	175	Senior	Rocky Mount, NC	Walk-on; graduated

=== 2019 recruiting class ===
On September 24, 2018, four-star forward Ismael Massoud committed to Wake Forest. On October 29, 2018, 3-star center Ody Oguama committed to the Demon Deacons. On November 15, 2018, three-star guard Jacobi Neath committed to WFU. On April 13, 2019, three-star power forward Tariq Ingraham committed to Wake Forest.

College recruiting
Name	Hometown	School	Height	Weight	Commit date
Ismael Massoud; SF	Bronx, NY	The MacDuffie School	6 ft 8 in (2.03 m)	195 lb (88 kg)	Sep 24, 2018
Ismael Massoud; SF	Recruit ratings: Scout: Rivals: 247Sports: ESPN:				
Ody Oguama; C	Raleigh, NC	Woodstock Academy	6 ft 9 in (2.06 m)	185 lb (84 kg)	Oct 29, 2018
Ody Oguama; C	Recruit ratings: Scout: Rivals: 247Sports: ESPN:				
Jahcobi Neath; SG	Toronto, ON	Crestwood Secondary	6 ft 3 in (1.91 m)	170 lb (77 kg)	Nov 15, 2018
Jahcobi Neath; SG	Recruit ratings: Scout: Rivals: 247Sports: ESPN:				
Tariq Ingraham; SF	Upper Darby, PA	Monsignor Bonner High School	6 ft 7 in (2.01 m)	210 lb (95 kg)	Apr 13, 2019
Tariq Ingraham; SF	Recruit ratings: Scout: Rivals: 247Sports: ESPN:				
Overall recruit ranking:
Note: In many cases, Scout, Rivals, 247Sports, On3, and ESPN may conflict in their listings of height and weight.; In these cases, the average was taken. ESPN grades are on a 100-point scale.; Sources: "2019 Team Ranking". Rivals.

=== 2020 recruiting class ===
College recruiting (2020)
Name	Hometown	School	Height	Weight	Commit date
Marcus Watson Jr. PG	Chicago, IL	Morgan Park High School	5 ft 11 in (1.80 m)	155 lb (70 kg)	Aug 20, 2019
Marcus Watson Jr. PG	Recruit ratings: Scout: Rivals: 247Sports: ESPN:				
Jaylon Gibson; PF	Raleigh, NC	Grace Academy	6 ft 11 in (2.11 m)	190 lb (86 kg)	Aug 2, 2019
Jaylon Gibson; PF	Recruit ratings: Scout: Rivals: 247Sports: ESPN:				
Djimon Bailey; SG	Raleigh, NC	Grace Academy	6 ft 5 in (1.96 m)	170 lb (77 kg)	May 6, 2019
Djimon Bailey; SG	Recruit ratings: Scout: Rivals: 247Sports: ESPN:				
Overall recruit ranking:
Note: In many cases, Scout, Rivals, 247Sports, On3, and ESPN may conflict in their listings of height and weight.; In these cases, the average was taken. ESPN grades are on a 100-point scale.; Sources: "2020 Team Ranking". Rivals.

== Roster ==
2019–20 Wake Forest Demon Deacons men's basketball team
Players
Coaches

Pos.	#	Name	Height	Weight	Year	Previous school	Hometown
G	0	Brandon Childress	6 ft 0 in (1.83 m)	195 lb (88 kg)	Sr	Wesleyan Christian Academy	Winston-Salem, NC
F	1	Isaiah Mucius	6 ft 8 in (2.03 m)	195 lb (88 kg)	So	Brewster Academy	East Patchogue, NY
G	2	Sharone Wright Jr.	6 ft 5 in (1.96 m)	185 lb (84 kg)	So	Legacy Early College	Florence, SC
G	4	Jahcobi Neath	6 ft 3 in (1.91 m)	200 lb (91 kg)	Fr	Crestwood Prep	Toronto, ON
F	10	Tariq Ingraham	6 ft 8 in (2.03 m)	270 lb (122 kg)	Fr	Bonner-Prendergast	Philadelphia, PA
G	11	Torry Johnson	6 ft 3 in (1.91 m)	175 lb (79 kg)	GS	Morgan Park; Northern Arizona	Chicago, IL
G	13	Andrien White	6 ft 3 in (1.91 m)	200 lb (91 kg)	RS Sr	Quality Education Academy; Charlotte	Richmond, Virginia
G	20	Michael Wynn	6 ft 6 in (1.98 m)	210 lb (95 kg)	So	Liberty Heights Athletic Institute	Albany, NY
G	23	Chaundee Brown	6 ft 5 in (1.96 m)	220 lb (100 kg)	Jr	First Academy	Orlando, FL
F	25	Ismael Massoud	6 ft 8 in (2.03 m)	200 lb (91 kg)	Fr	MacDuffie School	East Harlem, NY
C	30	Olivier Sarr	7 ft 0 in (2.13 m)	255 lb (116 kg)	Jr	INSEP	Toulouse, France
F	31	Blake Buchanan	6 ft 5 in (1.96 m)	205 lb (93 kg)	So	Voyager Academy	Durham, NC
F	33	Ody Oguama	6 ft 9 in (2.06 m)	205 lb (93 kg)	Fr	Woodstock Academy	Raleigh, NC
F	34	Sunday Okeke (W)	6 ft 8 in (2.03 m)	250 lb (113 kg)	Jr	Greens Farms Academy	Lagos, Nigeria
F	52	Grant van Beveren (W)	6 ft 6 in (1.98 m)	215 lb (98 kg)	Fr	Chattahoochee	Alpharetta, GA
G	55	Miles Lester (W)	6 ft 0 in (1.83 m)	180 lb (82 kg)	RS So	Wilbraham & Monson Academy; Rice	Wichita, KS

Head coach

- Danny Manning (Kansas)

Assistant coach(es)

- Randolph Childress (Wake Forest)
- Rex Walters (Kansas)
- Steve Woodberry (Kansas)

Legend

- (C) Team captain
- (S) Suspended
- (I) Ineligible
- (W) Walk-on
- Injured
- Current redshirt

Roster

== Schedule and results ==
Date time, TV	Rank^{#}	Opponent^{#}	Result	Record	High points	High rebounds	High assists	Site (attendance) city, state
Regular season
November 6, 2019; 6:00 pm, ESPNU		at Boston College	L 70–77	0–1 (0–1)	24 – Childress	12 – Brown	7 – Childress	Conte Forum (4,815); Chestnut Hill, MA
November 10, 2019*; 2:00 pm, ACCNX		Columbia	W 65–63	1–1	20 – Brown	9 – Brown	3 – Neath	LJVM Coliseum (4,451); Winston-Salem, NC
November 13, 2019*; 7:00 pm, ACCNX		UNC Asheville	W 98–79	2–1	23 – Brown	11 – Brown	9 – Childress	LJVM Coliseum (4,187); Winston-Salem, NC
November 17, 2019*; 6:00 pm, ESPNU		at Charlotte	L 65–67	2–2	19 – Childress	13 – Sarr	4 – Childress	Dale F. Halton Arena (4,819); Charlotte, NC
November 22, 2019*; 7:30 p.m., ESPN+		vs. Davidson	W 82–70	3–2	18 – Childress	12 – Sarr	7 – Childress	Spectrum Center (4,200); Charlotte, NC
November 28, 2019*; 4:30 pm, ESPNews		vs. Charleston; Wooden Legacy quarterfinals	W 65–56	4–2	14 – Sarr	14 – Sarr	6 – Childress	Anaheim Arena; Anaheim, CA
November 29, 2019*; 2:00 pm, ESPN2		vs. Long Beach State; Wooden Legacy semifinals	W 88–75	5–2	17 – Childress	8 – Sarr	4 – Tied	Anaheim Arena; Anaheim, CA
December 1, 2019*; 8:00 pm, ESPN		vs. No. 14 Arizona; Wooden Legacy championship	L 66–73	5–3	21 – Sarr	13 – Sarr	4 – Tied	Anaheim Arena (2,185); Anaheim, CA
December 4, 2019*; 9:15 pm, ESPNU		at Penn State; ACC–Big Ten Challenge	L 54–76	5–4	14 – Sarr	10 – Sarr	2 – 2 tied	Bryce Jordan Center (6,476); University Park, PA
December 7, 2019; 2:00 pm, ACCN		NC State; Rivalry	L 82–91	5–5 (0–2)	30 – Childress	9 – Sarr	4 – Childress	LJVM Coliseum (6,118); Winston-Salem, NC
December 14, 2019*; 4:00 pm, ACCN		No. 23 Xavier; Skip Prosser Classic	W 80–78	6–5	26 – Brown	6 – 3 tied	3 – 3 tied	LJVM Coliseum (5,847); Winston-Salem, NC
December 21, 2019*; 12:00 pm, ACCN		North Carolina A&T	W 76–64	7–5	25 – Brown	10 – Tied	4 – Tied	LJVM Coliseum (5,156); Winston-Salem, NC
January 4, 2020; 12:00 pm, ACCNX		at Pittsburgh	W 69–65	8–5 (1–2)	14 – Massoud	7 – Tied	6 – Childress	Peterson Events Center (10,155); Pittsburgh, PA
January 8, 2020; 7:30 pm, ACCRSN		No. 10 Florida State	L 68–78	8–6 (1–3)	20 – Childress	7 – Sarr	5 – Johnson	LJVM Coliseum (5,277); Winston-Salem, NC
January 11, 2020; 8:00 pm, ACCN		at No. 2 Duke	L 59–90	8–7 (1–4)	13 – Tied	9 – Sarr	4 – Childress	Cameron Indoor Stadium (9,314); Durham, NC
January 14, 2020; 9:00 pm, ACCN		Virginia Tech	L 70–80	8–8 (1–5)	18 – Sarr	9 – Sarr	2 – 3 tied	LJVM Coliseum (4,873); Winston-Salem, NC
January 19, 2020; 6:00 pm, ACCN		Boston College	W 80–62	9–8 (2–5)	20 – Childress	13 – Sarr	7 – Childress	LJVM Coliseum (6,872); Winston-Salem, NC
January 21, 2020; 8:00 pm, ACCN		at Clemson	L 68–71	9–9 (2–6)	22 – White	12 – Sarr	6 – Childress	Littlejohn Coliseum (6,951); Clemson, SC
January 26, 2020; 12:00 pm, ACCN		Virginia	L 63–65 ^{OT}	9–10 (2–7)	21 – White	10 – Tied	3 – Sarr	LJVM Coliseum (7,752); Winston-Salem, NC
January 29, 2020; 7:00 pm, ACCN		at Notre Dame	L 80–90	9–11 (2–8)	24 – Childress	6 – Tied	5 – Childress	Edmund P. Joyce Center (6,402); South Bend, IN
February 1, 2020; 8:00 pm, ACCN		Clemson	W 56–44	10–11 (3–8)	17 – White	13 – Sarr	5 – Childress	LJVM Coliseum (7,113); Winston-Salem, NC
February 5, 2020; 9:00 pm, ESPN2		at No. 5 Louisville	L 76–86	10–12 (3–9)	17 – White	7 – Mucius	6 – Johnson	KFC Yum! Center (15,270); Louisville, KY
February 8, 2020; 8:00 pm, ACCN		at Syracuse	L 73–75	10–13 (3–10)	15 – Sarr	9 – Sarr	5 – Neath	Carrier Dome (21,824); Syracuse, NY
February 11, 2020; 8:00 pm, ACCN		North Carolina	W 74–57	11–13 (4–10)	15 – White	8 – Oguama	10 – Childress	LJVM Coliseum (10,894); Winston-Salem, NC
February 15, 2020; 2:00 pm, ACCRSN		at Miami (FL)	L 54–71	11–14 (4–11)	15 – Childress	6 – Tied	6 – Neath	Watsco Center (5,360); Coral Gables, FL
February 19, 2020; 7:00 pm, ACCRSN		Georgia Tech	L 79–86	11–15 (4–12)	16 – Tied	7 – Brown	3 – Neath	LJVM Coliseum (7,562); Winston-Salem, NC
February 25, 2020; 7:00 pm, ACCN		No. 7 Duke	W 113–101 ^{2OT}	12–15 (5–12)	25 – Sarr	8 – Brown	5 – Childress	LJVM Coliseum (11,681); Winston-Salem, NC
February 29, 2020; 4:00 pm, ACCRSN		Notre Dame	W 84–73	13–15 (6–12)	30 – Sarr	17 – Sarr	6 – Childress	LJVM Coliseum (8,870); Winston-Salem, NC
March 3, 2020; 7:00 pm, ACCN		at North Carolina	L 83–93	13–16 (6–13)	24 – Childress	11 – Sarr	9 – Childress	Dean Smith Center (21,280); Durham, NC
March 6, 2020; 7:00 pm, ACCN		at NC State; Rivalry	L 64–84	13–17 (6–14)	19 – Childress	9 – Brown	5 – Neath	PNC Arena (15,824); Raleigh, NC
ACC tournament
March 10, 2020; 4:30 pm, ACCN	(12)	vs. (13) Pittsburgh; First round	L 72–81	13–18	20 – Sarr	13 – Sarr	6 – Neath	Greensboro Coliseum (13,310); Greensboro, NC
*Non-conference game. ^{#}Rankings from AP Poll. (#) Tournament seedings in parentheses. All times are in Eastern Time.
