= 2019–20 NC State Wolfpack men's basketball team =

American college basketball season

2019–20 NC State Wolfpack men's basketball
- Conference: Atlantic Coast Conference
- Record: 20–12 (10–10 ACC)
- Head coach: Kevin Keatts (3rd season)
- Assistant coaches: James Johnson; Roy Roberson; Takayo Siddle
- Home arena: PNC Arena

2019–20 ACC men's basketball standings
	Conf.				Overall
Team	W		L	PCT	W		L	PCT
No. 4 Florida State	16	–	4	.800	26	–	5	.839
No. 16 Virginia	15	–	5	.750	23	–	7	.767
No. 14 Louisville	15	–	5	.750	24	–	7	.774
No. 11 Duke	15	–	5	.750	25	–	6	.806
Georgia Tech*	11	–	9	.550	17	–	14	.548
NC State	10	–	10	.500	20	–	12	.625
Syracuse	10	–	10	.500	18	–	14	.563
Notre Dame	10	–	10	.500	20	–	12	.625
Clemson	9	–	11	.450	16	–	15	.516
Miami (FL)	7	–	13	.350	15	–	16	.484
Boston College	7	–	13	.350	13	–	18	.419
Virginia Tech	7	–	13	.350	16	–	16	.500
Wake Forest	6	–	14	.300	13	–	18	.419
Pittsburgh	6	–	14	.300	16	–	17	.485
North Carolina	6	–	14	.300	14	–	19	.424
*Ineligible for postseason due to NCAA violations. Note: The 2020 ACC tournament was cancelled before the quarterfinals due to the COVID-19 pandemic. Rankings from AP poll

The 2019–20 NC State Wolfpack men's basketball team represented North Carolina State University during the 2019–20 NCAA Division I men's basketball season. The Wolfpack were led by third-year head coach Kevin Keatts and played its home games at PNC Arena in Raleigh, North Carolina as members of the Atlantic Coast Conference (ACC). After winning its second round match-up with Pittsburgh in the 2020 ACC men's basketball tournament and before its quarterfinal match-up with Duke, the tournament was canceled due to concerns with the COVID-19 pandemic. Later that afternoon, the NCAA announced that all Winter and Spring championships would be canceled, including the NCAA tournament. They finished the season 20–12, 10–10 in ACC play to finish in a tie for sixth place.

== Previous season ==
The Wolfpack finished the 2018–19 season 24–12, 9–9 in ACC play to finish in a tie for eighth place. They lost in the quarterfinals of the ACC tournament to Virginia. They received a bid to the NIT where they lost in the quarterfinals to Lipscomb.

== Offseason ==
=== Departures ===
Name	Number	Pos.	Height	Weight	Year	Hometown	Reason for departure
Sacha Killeya-Jones	1	F	6'11"	220	Junior	Chapel Hill, NC	Turned pro
Torin Dorn	2	G	6'5"	210	RS Senior	Charlotte, NC	Graduated
Eric Lockett	5	G	6'5"	193	RS Senior	Warner Robins, GA	Graduated
Wyatt Walker	33	F	6'9"	240	Senior	Jacksonville, FL	Graduated
Blake Harris	55	G	6'3"	190	Sophomore	Chapel Hill, NC	Transferred to North Carolina A&T

=== Incoming transfers ===
Name	Number	Pos.	Height	Weight	Year	Hometown	Previous School
Atticus Taylor	3	G/F	6'7"	205	RS Sophomore	Davenport, IA	Junior college transferred from SW Mississippi CC.
Thomas Allen	5	G	6'1"	184	Junior	Garner, NC	Transferred from Nebraska. Under NCAA transfer rules, Allen will have to sit out for the 2019–20 season. Will have two years of remaining eligibility.
Danny Dixon	21	F	6'10"	230	Graduate Student	Grosse Pointe Park, MI	Transferred from Kansas City after graduating. Will have one year of eligibility beginning immediately.
Pat Andree	31	F	6'8"	225	Graduate Student	Colts Neck, NJ	Transferred from Lehigh after graduating. Will have one year of eligibility beginning immediately.

=== 2019 recruiting class ===
College recruiting information
Name	Hometown	School	Height	Weight	Commit date
Dereon Seabron; SG	Norfolk, VA	Massanutten Military Academy	6 ft 5 in (1.96 m)	180 lb (82 kg)	Jan 14, 2019
Dereon Seabron; SG	Recruit ratings: Scout: Rivals: 247Sports: ESPN: (80)				
Overall recruit ranking:
Note: In many cases, Scout, Rivals, 247Sports, On3, and ESPN may conflict in their listings of height and weight.; In these cases, the average was taken. ESPN grades are on a 100-point scale.; Sources: "2019 Team Ranking". Rivals.

=== 2020 Recruiting class ===
College recruiting information (2020)
Name	Hometown	School	Height	Weight	Commit date
Nick Farrar; PF	Apex, NC	Apex Friendship High School	6 ft 7 in (2.01 m)	230 lb (100 kg)	Aug 7, 2019
Nick Farrar; PF	Recruit ratings: Scout: Rivals: 247Sports: ESPN: (NR)				
Cam Hayes; PG	Greensboro, NC	Greensboro Day School	6 ft 1 in (1.85 m)	160 lb (73 kg)	Sep 13, 2019
Cam Hayes; PG	Recruit ratings: Scout: Rivals: 247Sports: ESPN: (82)				
Overall recruit ranking:
Note: In many cases, Scout, Rivals, 247Sports, On3, and ESPN may conflict in their listings of height and weight.; In these cases, the average was taken. ESPN grades are on a 100-point scale.; Sources: "2020 Team Ranking". Rivals.

== Roster ==
2019–20 NC State Wolfpack men's basketball team
Players
Coaches

Pos.	#	Name	Height	Weight	Year	Hometown
F	0	D. J. Funderburk	6 ft 10 in (2.08 m)	225 lb (102 kg)	RS Jr	Cleveland, Ohio
G	1	Dereon Seabron (redshirt)	6 ft 7 in (2.01 m)	180 lb (82 kg)	Fr	Norfolk, Virginia
G	2	Chase Graham (W)	6 ft 1 in (1.85 m)	170 lb (77 kg)	Fr	Raleigh, North Carolina
F	3	A. J. Taylor	6 ft 6 in (1.98 m)	205 lb (93 kg)	RS So	Davenport, Iowa
F	4	Jericole Hellems	6 ft 7 in (2.01 m)	205 lb (93 kg)	So	St. Louis, Missouri
G	5	Thomas Allen (redshirt)	6 ft 1 in (1.85 m)	184 lb (83 kg)	Jr	Garner, North Carolina
G	10	Braxton Beverly	6 ft 0 in (1.83 m)	180 lb (82 kg)	Jr	Hazard, Kentucky
G	11	Markell Johnson	6 ft 1 in (1.85 m)	175 lb (79 kg)	Sr	Cleveland, Ohio
G	13	C. J. Bryce	6 ft 5 in (1.96 m)	210 lb (95 kg)	RS Sr	Charlotte, North Carolina
F	15	Manny Bates	6 ft 11 in (2.11 m)	230 lb (104 kg)	RS Fr	Fayetteville, North Carolina
F	21	Danny Dixon	6 ft 10 in (2.08 m)	230 lb (104 kg)	GS	Grosse Pointe Park, Michigan
G	22	Max Farthing (W)	6 ft 7 in (2.01 m)	205 lb (93 kg)	Fr	Raleigh, North Carolina
G	24	Devon Daniels	6 ft 5 in (1.96 m)	205 lb (93 kg)	RS Jr	Battle Creek, Michigan
F	31	Pat Andree	6 ft 8 in (2.03 m)	220 lb (100 kg)	GS	Colts Neck, New Jersey

Head coach

- Kevin Keatts (Ferrum)

Assistant coach(es)

- James Johnson (Ferrum)
- Roy Roberson (Lynchburg)
- Takayo Siddle (Gardner–Webb)

Legend

- (C) Team captain
- (S) Suspended
- (I) Ineligible
- (W) Walk-on
- Injured
- Current redshirt

Roster Source:

== Schedule and results ==
Date time, TV	Rank^{#}	Opponent^{#}	Result	Record	High points	High rebounds	High assists	Site (attendance) city, state
Exhibition
October 27, 2019*; 2:00 p.m., ACCNX		Mount Olive	W 113–73	–	26 – Johnson	10 – Bryce	9 – Johnson	PNC Arena; Raleigh, NC
Regular season
November 5, 2019; 8:30 p.m., ACCN		Georgia Tech	L 81–82 ^{OT}	0–1 (0–1)	24 – Bryce	11 – Bryce	5 – Tied	PNC Arena (17,133); Raleigh, NC
November 10, 2019*; 4:00 p.m., ACCRSN		Detroit Mercy	W 84–65	1–1	23 – Beverly	7 – Johnson	10 – Johnson	PNC Arena (13,430); Raleigh, NC
November 13, 2019*; 9:00 p.m., ACCRSN		FIU	W 86–77	2–1	16 – Bryce	7 – Tied	4 – Johnson	PNC Arena (14,024); Raleigh, NC
November 16, 2019*; 12:00 p.m., ACCNX		St. Francis Brooklyn; Barclays Classic	W 95–64	3–1	22 – Bryce	11 – Bryce	9 – Johnson	Reynolds Coliseum (4,774); Raleigh, NC
November 19, 2019*; 7:00 p.m., ACCNX		Alcorn State; Barclays Classic	W 87–64	4–1	23 – Daniels	6 – 3 tied	8 – Johnson	Reynolds Coliseum (4,624); Raleigh, NC
November 23, 2019*; 1:00 p.m., ACCNX		Little Rock; Barclays Classic	W 74–58	5–1	18 – Bryce	6 – Tied	6 – Hellems	PNC Arena (14,078); Raleigh, NC
November 28, 2019*; 4:00 p.m., ESPN2		vs. No. 16 Memphis; Barclays Classic	L 78–83	5–2	22 – Johnson	5 – 3 tied	6 – Johnson	Barclays Center (1,778); Brooklyn, NY
December 4, 2019*; 9:15 p.m., ESPN2		Wisconsin; ACC–Big Ten Challenge	W 69–54	6–2	23 – Hellems	4 – 4 tied	2 – Tied	PNC Arena (16,035); Raleigh, NC
December 7, 2019; 2:00 p.m., ACCN		at Wake Forest; Rivalry	W 91–82	7–2 (1–1)	18 – Bryce	7 – Tied	7 – Johnson	LJVM Coliseum (6,118); Winston-Salem, NC
December 15, 2019*; 3:00 p.m., ESPN+		at UNC Greensboro	W 80–77	8–2	19 – Johnson	5 – Bryce	7 – Johnson	Greensboro Coliseum (7,469); Greensboro, NC
December 19, 2019*; 9:00 p.m., ESPN2		at No. 12 Auburn	L 73–79	8–3	21 – Bryce	11 – Bryce	10 – Johnson	Auburn Arena (9,121); Auburn, AL
December 22, 2019*; 6:00 p.m., ACCN		The Citadel	W 83–63	9–3	18 – Daniels	10 – Johnson	10 – Johnson	PNC Arena (15,501); Raleigh, NC
December 29, 2019*; 4:00 p.m., ACCN		Appalachian State	W 72–60	10–3	22 – Funderburk	11 – Tied	6 – Johnson	PNC Arena (17,592); Raleigh, NC
January 4, 2020; 12:00 p.m., ACCN		at Clemson	L 70–81	10–4 (1–2)	14 – Funderburk	7 – Bates	7 – Johnson	Littlejohn Coliseum (6,908); Clemson, SC
January 8, 2020; 7:00 p.m., ESPN2		Notre Dame	W 73–68	11–4 (2–2)	27 – Johnson	9 – Funderburk	7 – Johnson	PNC Arena (16,825); Raleigh, NC
January 11, 2020; 2:00 p.m., ACCRSN		at Virginia Tech	L 58–72	11–5 (2–3)	18 – Funderburk	9 – Funderburk	9 – Johnson	Cassell Coliseum (9,275); Blacksburg, VA
January 15, 2020; 7:00 p.m., ACCRSN		Miami (FL)	W 80–63	12–5 (3–3)	19 – Funderburk	8 – Funderburk	5 – Bryce	PNC Arena (15,801); Raleigh, NC
January 18, 2020; 2:00 p.m., ACCRSN		Clemson	W 60–54	13–5 (4–3)	13 – 3 tied	9 – Funderburk	5 – Johnson	PNC Arena (16,553); Raleigh, NC
January 20, 2020; 7:00 p.m., ESPN		at Virginia	W 53–51	14–5 (5–3)	14 – Funderburk	5 – 3 tied	5 – Johnson	John Paul Jones Arena (14,163); Charlottesville, VA
January 25, 2020; 4:00 p.m., ACCRSN		at Georgia Tech	L 58–64	14–6 (5–4)	21 – Johnson	8 – Daniels	4 – Johnson	Hank McCamish Pavilion (6,794); Atlanta, GA
January 27, 2020; 7:00 p.m., ESPN		North Carolina; Rivalry	L 65–75	14–7 (5–5)	18 – Funderburk	8 – Funderburk	6 – Johnson	PNC Arena (19,533); Raleigh, NC
February 1, 2020; 2:00 p.m., ESPN		No. 6 Louisville	L 57–77	14–8 (5–6)	15 – Bryce	8 – Funderburk	5 – Johnson	PNC Arena (18,197); Raleigh, NC
February 5, 2020; 8:30 p.m., ACCN		at Miami (FL)	W 83–72	15–8 (6–6)	22 – Bryce	11 – Bryce	12 – Johnson	Watsco Center (5,164); Coral Gables, FL
February 11, 2020; 7:00 p.m., ESPN2		at Syracuse	W 79–74	16–8 (7–6)	23 – Daniels	7 – Hellems	8 – Johnson	Carrier Dome (22,137); Syracuse, NY
February 16, 2020; 6:00 p.m., ACCN		at Boston College	L 68–71	16–9 (7–7)	15 – 3 tied	10 – Daniels	4 – Bryce	Conte Forum (6,304); Chestnut Hill, MA
February 19, 2020; 9:00 p.m., ESPN		No. 6 Duke; Rivalry	W 88–66	17–9 (8–7)	28 – Johnson	10 – Bryce	4 – Johnson	PNC Arena (19,515); Raleigh, NC
February 22, 2020; 4:00 p.m., ACCN		No. 8 Florida State	L 61–67	17–10 (8–8)	18 – Daniels	9 – Daniels	5 – Johnson	PNC Arena (17,444); Raleigh, NC
February 25, 2020; 9:00 p.m., ESPN		at North Carolina; Rivalry	L 79–85	17–11 (8–9)	21 – Johnson	9 – Funderburk	10 – Johnson	Dean Smith Center (21,338); Chapel Hill, NC
February 29, 2020; 12:00 p.m., ACCN		Pittsburgh	W 77–73	18–11 (9–9)	16 – Bryce	10 – Bates	6 – Johnson	PNC Arena (15,818); Raleigh, NC
March 2, 2020; 7:00 p.m., ESPN		at No. 12 Duke; Tobacco Road	L 69–88	18–12 (9–10)	14 – 3 tied	9 – Daniels	7 – Johnson	Cameron Indoor Stadium (9,314); Durham, NC
March 6, 2020; 7:00 p.m., ACCN		Wake Forest; Rivalry	W 84–64	19–12 (10–10)	19 – Funderburk	7 – Funderburk	10 – Johnson	PNC Arena (15,824); Raleigh, NC
ACC tournament
March 11, 2020; 2:00 p.m., ESPN	(5)	vs. (13) Pittsburgh; Second round	W 73–58	20–12	23 – Daniels	10 – Bryce	11 – Johnson	Greensboro Coliseum; Greensboro, NC
March 12, 2020; 2:30 p.m., ESPN	(5)	vs. (4) No. 10 Duke; Quarterfinals	canceled					Greensboro Coliseum; Greensboro, NC
*Non-conference game. ^{#}Rankings from AP Poll. (#) Tournament seedings in parentheses. All times are in Eastern Time.

Schedule Source:
