= 2019–20 Miami Hurricanes men's basketball team =

American college basketball season

2019–20 Miami Hurricanes men's basketball
- Conference: Atlantic Coast Conference
- Record: 15–16 (7–13 ACC)
- Head coach: Jim Larrañaga (9th season)
- Assistant coaches: Chris Caputo; Adam Fisher; Bill Courtney
- Home arena: Watsco Center

2019–20 ACC men's basketball standings
	Conf.				Overall
Team	W		L	PCT	W		L	PCT
No. 4 Florida State	16	–	4	.800	26	–	5	.839
No. 16 Virginia	15	–	5	.750	23	–	7	.767
No. 14 Louisville	15	–	5	.750	24	–	7	.774
No. 11 Duke	15	–	5	.750	25	–	6	.806
Georgia Tech*	11	–	9	.550	17	–	14	.548
NC State	10	–	10	.500	20	–	12	.625
Syracuse	10	–	10	.500	18	–	14	.563
Notre Dame	10	–	10	.500	20	–	12	.625
Clemson	9	–	11	.450	16	–	15	.516
Miami (FL)	7	–	13	.350	15	–	16	.484
Boston College	7	–	13	.350	13	–	18	.419
Virginia Tech	7	–	13	.350	16	–	16	.500
Wake Forest	6	–	14	.300	13	–	18	.419
Pittsburgh	6	–	14	.300	16	–	17	.485
North Carolina	6	–	14	.300	14	–	19	.424
*Ineligible for postseason due to NCAA violations. Note: The 2020 ACC tournament was cancelled before the quarterfinals due to the COVID-19 pandemic. Rankings from AP poll

The 2019–20 Miami Hurricanes men's basketball team represented the University of Miami during the 2019–20 NCAA Division I men's basketball season. Led by ninth-year head coach Jim Larrañaga, they played their home games at the Watsco Center on the university's campus in Coral Gables, Florida as members of the Atlantic Coast Conference (ACC).

The Hurricanes finished the season 15–16, and 7–13 in ACC play. They lost to Clemson in the second round of the ACC tournament. The tournament was cancelled before the quarterfinals due to the COVID-19 pandemic. The NCAA tournament and NIT were also cancelled due to the pandemic.

== Previous season ==
The Hurricanes finished the 2018–19 season 14–18, 5–13 in ACC play to finish in a tie for eleventh place. They defeated Wake Forest in the first round of the ACC tournament before losing to Virginia Tech. They were not invited to either the NCAA tournament or NIT.

== Offseason ==
=== Departures ===
Departures
Name	Number	Pos.	Height	Weight	Year	Hometown	Reason for departure
Anthony Lawrence II	3	G	6'7"	210	Senior	St. Petersburg, FL	Graduated
Zach Johnson	5	G	6'2"	195	RS senior	Miami, FL	Graduated
Dominic Proctor	10	G	6'6"	180	Sophomore	Las Vegas, NV	Walk-on; didn't return
Anthony Mack	13	G	6'6"	210	RS freshman	Las Vegas, NV	Play professionally
Ebuka Izundu	15	C	6'10"	235	Senior	Charlotte, NC	Graduated
Dewan Hernandez	20	F	6'11"	236	Junior	Miami, FL	Declared for 2019 NBA draft

=== Incoming transfers ===
Incoming transfers
Name	Number	Pos.	Height	Weight	Year	Hometown	Previous school
Nysier Brooks	3	C	6'11"	240	Senior	Philadelphia, PA	Cincinnati
Keith Stone	4	F	6'8"	253	Graduate student	Deerfield Beach, FL	Florida

=== 2019 recruiting class ===
College recruiting
Name	Hometown	School	Height	Weight	Commit date
Harlond Beverly; G	Detroit, MI	Montverde Academy (FL)	6 ft 4 in (1.93 m)	167 lb (76 kg)	Apr 15, 2019
Harlond Beverly; G	Recruit ratings: Scout: Rivals: 247Sports: ESPN:				
Isaiah Wong; G	Piscataway, NJ	Monsignor Bonner High School (PA)	6 ft 3 in (1.91 m)	175 lb (79 kg)	Sep 26, 2018
Isaiah Wong; G	Recruit ratings: Scout: Rivals: 247Sports: ESPN:				
Anthony Walker; F	Baltimore, MD	Brewster Academy (NH)	6 ft 9 in (2.06 m)	210 lb (95 kg)	Oct 20, 2018
Anthony Walker; F	Recruit ratings: Scout: Rivals: 247Sports: ESPN:				
Overall recruit ranking: Rivals: 26
Note: In many cases, Scout, Rivals, 247Sports, On3, and ESPN may conflict in their listings of height and weight.; In these cases, the average was taken. ESPN grades are on a 100-point scale.; Sources: "2019 Team Ranking". Rivals.

== Roster ==
2019–20 Miami Hurricanes men's basketball team
Players
Coaches

Pos.	#	Name	Height	Weight	Year	Hometown
G	0	Chris Lykes	5 ft 7 in (1.7 m)	157 lb (71 kg)	Jr	Mitchellville, MD
G	1	Dejan Vasiljevic	6 ft 3 in (1.91 m)	184 lb (83 kg)	Sr	Melbourne, Australia
G	2	Isaiah Wong	6 ft 3 in (1.91 m)	170 lb (77 kg)	Fr	Piscataway, NJ
C	3	Nysier Brooks (I) (redshirt)	6 ft 11 in (2.11 m)	240 lb (109 kg)	Sr	Philadelphia, PA
F	4	Keith Stone	6 ft 8 in (2.03 m)	253 lb (115 kg)	GS	Deerfield Beach, FL
G	5	Harlond Beverly	6 ft 4 in (1.93 m)	170 lb (77 kg)	Fr	Detroit, MI
F	11	Anthony Walker	6 ft 9 in (2.06 m)	210 lb (95 kg)	Fr	Baltimore, MD
C	14	Rodney Miller Jr.	7 ft 0 in (2.13 m)	255 lb (116 kg)	RS Jr	Laurelton, NY
G	15	Willie Herenton (W)	6 ft 1 in (1.85 m)	178 lb (81 kg)	Jr	Lincolnshire, IL
F	21	Sam Waardenburg	6 ft 10 in (2.08 m)	216 lb (98 kg)	RS Jr	Henderson, New Zealand
F	22	Deng Gak	6 ft 10 in (2.08 m)	211 lb (96 kg)	RS So	Sydney, Australia
G	23	Kameron McGusty	6 ft 5 in (1.96 m)	192 lb (87 kg)	RS Jr	Katy, TX

Head coach

- Jim Larrañaga (Providence)

Assistant coach(es)

- Chris Caputo (Westfield State)
- Adam Fisher (Penn State)
- Bill Courtney (Bucknell)

Legend

- (C) Team captain
- (S) Suspended
- (I) Ineligible
- (W) Walk-on
- Injured
- Current redshirt

Roster
Last update: 2019-08-30

== Schedule and results ==
Date time, TV	Rank^{#}	Opponent^{#}	Result	Record	High points	High rebounds	High assists	Site (attendance) city, state
Exhibition
Oct 30, 2019*; 7:00 pm, ACCNX		Flagler	W 86–65	–	20 – McGusty	8 – Waardenburg	3 – Beverly	Watsco Center (4,662); Coral Gables, FL
Regular season
Nov 5, 2019; 6:30 pm, ACCN		No. 5 Louisville	L 74–87	0–1 (0–1)	18 – Lykes	9 – Miller	5 – Lykes	Watsco Center (7,576); Coral Gables, FL
Nov 8, 2019*; 7:00 pm, ACCRSN		Florida Atlantic	W 74–60	1–1	15 – Lykes	11 – Waardenburg	4 – Beverly	Watsco Center (5,168); Coral Gables, FL
Nov 12, 2019*; 9:00 pm, CBSSN		at UCF	W 79–70	2–1	17 – McGusty	10 – McGusty	4 – Tied	Addition Financial Arena (7,514); Orlando, FL
Nov 16, 2019*; 2:00 pm, ACCNX		Quinnipiac	W 80–52	3–1	22 – McGusty	10 – Vasiljevic	3 – Tied	Watsco Center (4,882); Coral Gables, FL
Nov 21, 2019*; 11:30 am, ESPNU		vs. Missouri State; Charleston Classic Quarterfinals	W 74–70	4–1	25 – Vasiljevic	8 – Miller	2 – Wong	TD Arena (2,914); Charleston, SC
Nov 22, 2019*; 12:00 pm, ESPN2		vs. Florida; Charleston Classic Semifinals	L 58–78	4–2	16 – Lykes	5 – Tied	3 – McGusty	TD Arena (3,245); Charleston, SC
Nov 24, 2019*; 1:00 pm, ESPN2		vs. UConn; Charleston Classic 3rd Place	L 55–80	4–3	11 – Vasiljevic	5 – Waardenburg	4 – McGusty	TD Arena (3,122); Charleston, SC
Dec 2, 2019*; 7:00 pm, ESPN2		at Illinois; Big Ten-ACC Challenge	W 81–79	5–3	28 – Lykes	8 – Waardenburg	3 – McGusty	State Farm Center (11,819); Champaign, IL
Dec 14, 2019*; 2:00 pm, ACCN		Alabama A&M	W 88–74	6–3	21 – McGusty	9 – Waardenburg	5 – Lykes	Watsco Center (4,649); Coral Gables, FL
Dec 17, 2019*; 9:30 pm, ESPNU		vs. Temple; Basketball Hall of Fame Invitational	W 78–77	7–3	17 – Lykes	10 – McGusty	6 – Lykes	Barclays Center (5,064); Brooklyn, NY
Dec 21, 2019*; 2:00 pm, ACCN		Coppin State	W 91–60	8–3	28 – McGusty	11 – Waardenburg	6 – Beverly	Watsco Center (4,963); Coral Gables, FL
Dec 31, 2019; 4:00 pm, ACCN		at Clemson	W 73–68 ^{OT}	9–3 (1–1)	27 – Lykes	9 – Stone	2 – Lykes	Littlejohn Coliseum (5,549); Clemson, SC
Jan 4, 2020; 8:00 pm, ESPN		No. 2 Duke	L 62–95	9–4 (1–2)	12 – McGusty	6 – Waardenburg	4 – Lykes	Watsco Center (7,049); Coral Gables, FL
Jan 7, 2020; 7:00 pm, ESPN2		at No. 13 Louisville	L 58–74	9–5 (1–3)	18 – Tied	10 – Waardenburg	2 – Tied	KFC Yum! Center (14,980); Louisville, KY
Jan 12, 2020; 6:00 pm, ACCN		Pittsburgh	W 66–58	10–5 (2–3)	19 – McGusty	10 – Waardenburg	5 – Beverly	Watsco Center (6,387); Coral Gables, FL
Jan 15, 2020; 7:00 pm, ACCRSN		at NC State	L 63–80	10–6 (2–4)	20 – Lykes	8 – McGusty	3 – 3 tied	PNC Arena (15,801); Raleigh, NC
Jan 18, 2020; 1:00 pm, ACCN		No. 9 Florida State	L 79–83 ^{OT}	10–7 (2–5)	24 – Lykes	11 – Waardenburg	6 – McGusty	Watsco Center (6,212); Coral Gables, FL
Jan 21, 2020; 9:00 pm, ESPN		at No. 8 Duke	L 59–89	10–8 (2–6)	13 – Tied	13 – Miller	3 – Beverly	Cameron Indoor Stadium (9,314); Durham, NC
Jan 25, 2020; 12:00 pm, ESPN2		at North Carolina	L 71–94	10–9 (2–7)	19 – Wong	4 – Miller	3 – Wong	Dean Smith Center (21,125); Chapel Hill, NC
Jan 28, 2020; 8:00 pm, ACCN		Virginia Tech	W 71–61	11–9 (3–7)	18 – Vasiljevic	9 – Miller	6 – Beverly	Watsco Center (5,197); Coral Gables, FL
Feb 2, 2020; 12:00 pm, ACCN		at Pittsburgh	L 57–62	11–10 (3–8)	16 – Miller	9 – Vasiljevic	2 – Tied	Peterson Events Center (9,759); Pittsburgh, PA
Feb 5, 2020; 8:30 pm, ACCN		NC State	L 72–83	11–11 (3–9)	20 – Beverly	7 – 3 tied	3 – Beverly	Watsco Center (5,164); Coral Gables, FL
Feb 8, 2020; 12:00 pm, ACCN		at No. 8 Florida State	L 81–99	11–12 (3–10)	23 – Wong	5 – Walker	2 – Tied	Donald L. Tucker Civic Center (11,500); Tallahassee, FL
Feb 12, 2020; 7:00 pm, ACCRSN		Boston College	W 85–58	12–12 (4–10)	21 – Wong	7 – Tied	6 – Beverly	Watsco Center (5,465); Coral Gables, FL
Feb 15, 2020; 2:00 pm, ACCRSN		Wake Forest	W 71–54	13–12 (5–10)	13 – Tied	10 – Miller	3 – Tied	Watsco Center (5,360); Coral Gables, FL
Feb 19, 2020; 9:00 pm, ACCRSN		at Virginia Tech	W 102–95 ^{3OT}	14–12 (6–10)	27 – Wong	18 – Stone	4 – Lykes	Cassell Coliseum (8,428); Blacksburg, VA
Feb 23, 2020; 6:00 pm, ACCN		at Notre Dame	L 71–87	14–13 (6–11)	12 – Tied	6 – Tied	4 – Lykes	Joyce Center (7,351); Notre Dame, IN
Feb 29, 2020; 8:00 pm, ACCN		at Georgia Tech	L 57–63	14–14 (6–12)	14 – Lykes	6 – Wong	2 – Miller	McCamish Pavilion (6,681); Atlanta, GA
Mar 4, 2020; 9:00 pm, ACCN		No. 22 Virginia	L 44–46	14–15 (6–13)	16 – Lykes	7 – Stone	1 – 6 tied	Watsco Center (5,318); Coral Gables, FL
Mar 7, 2020; 4:00 pm, ACCN		Syracuse	W 69–65 ^{OT}	15–15 (7–13)	18 – Wong	9 – Tied	6 – Stone	Watsco Center (6,025); Coral Gables, FL
ACC tournament
Mar 11, 2020; 12:00 pm, ESPN	(9)	vs. (8) Clemson; Second Round	L 64–69	15–16	21 – Lykes	8 – Waardenburg	3 – Wong	Greensboro Coliseum (6,025); Greensboro, NC
*Non-conference game. ^{#}Rankings from AP Poll. (#) Tournament seedings in parentheses. All times are in Eastern Time.

== Rankings ==
Ranking movements
	Week																			
Poll	Pre	1	2	3	4	5	6	7	8	9	10	11	12	13	14	15	16	17	18	Final
AP																				Not released
Coaches																				

*AP does not release post-NCAA Tournament rankings.
