= 2019–20 Clemson Tigers men's basketball team =

American college basketball season

2019–20 Clemson Tigers men's basketball
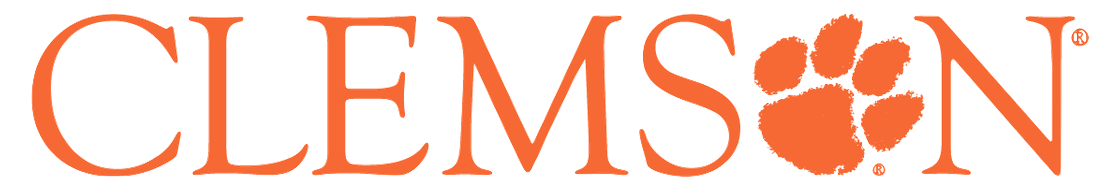
- Conference: Atlantic Coast Conference
- Record: 16–15 (9–11 ACC)
- Head coach: Brad Brownell (10th season)
- Assistant coaches: Antonio Reynolds-Dean (3rd season); Dick Bender (4th season); Anthony Goins (1st season)
- Home arena: Littlejohn Coliseum

2019–20 ACC men's basketball standings
	Conf.				Overall
Team	W		L	PCT	W		L	PCT
No. 4 Florida State	16	–	4	.800	26	–	5	.839
No. 16 Virginia	15	–	5	.750	23	–	7	.767
No. 14 Louisville	15	–	5	.750	24	–	7	.774
No. 11 Duke	15	–	5	.750	25	–	6	.806
Georgia Tech*	11	–	9	.550	17	–	14	.548
NC State	10	–	10	.500	20	–	12	.625
Syracuse	10	–	10	.500	18	–	14	.563
Notre Dame	10	–	10	.500	20	–	12	.625
Clemson	9	–	11	.450	16	–	15	.516
Miami (FL)	7	–	13	.350	15	–	16	.484
Boston College	7	–	13	.350	13	–	18	.419
Virginia Tech	7	–	13	.350	16	–	16	.500
Wake Forest	6	–	14	.300	13	–	18	.419
Pittsburgh	6	–	14	.300	16	–	17	.485
North Carolina	6	–	14	.300	14	–	19	.424
*Ineligible for postseason due to NCAA violations. Note: The 2020 ACC tournament was cancelled before the quarterfinals due to the COVID-19 pandemic. Rankings from AP poll

The 2019–20 Clemson Tigers men's basketball team represented Clemson University during the 2019–20 NCAA Division I men's basketball season. The Tigers were led by tenth-year head coach Brad Brownell and played their home games at Littlejohn Coliseum in Clemson, South Carolina as members of the Atlantic Coast Conference.

On January 11, 2020, Clemson defeated North Carolina 79–76 in overtime to win their first ever game in Chapel Hill in program history. Entering the game, the Tar Heels had been 59–0 at home against the Tigers, which was an NCAA record for longest win streak by one team at home versus one opponent.

The Tigers finished the season 16–15, and 9–11 in ACC play. The team was scheduled to play Florida State in the quarterfinals of the ACC tournament before the tournament was cancelled due to the COVID-19 pandemic. The NCAA tournament and NIT were also cancelled due to the pandemic.

== Previous season ==
The Tigers finished the 2018–19 season 20–14, 9–9 in ACC play to finish in a tie for eighth place. They lost in the first round of the ACC tournament to NC State. They received an at-large bid to the NIT where they defeated Wright State prior to losing to Wichita State in the second round.

== Offseason ==
=== Coaching changes ===
Clemson fired assistant coach Steve Smith, for comments made on FBI wire tap in relation to the 2017–18 NCAA Division I men's basketball corruption scandal. As a replacement, Clemson hired Anthony Goins.

=== Departures ===
Name	Number	Pos.	Height	Weight	Year	Hometown	Reason for departure
Marcquise Reed	2	G	6'3"	189	(redshirt) Senior	Landover, MD	Graduated
Lyles Davis	3	G	5'11"	160	Senior	Charleston, SC	Walk-on; graduated
Shelton Mitchell	4	G	6'3"	194	(redshirt) Senior	Waxhaw, NC	Graduated
Elijah Thomas	14	F	6'9"	237	Senior	Lancaster, TX	Graduated
Malik William	20	F	6'8"	226	Sophomore	Orlando, FL	Transferred to Southern Illinois
Anthony Oliver II	21	G	6'5"	180	(redshirt) Sophomore	Clemson, SC	Mid season transferred to Old Dominion
Javan White	35	F	6'10"	230	GS Senior	Ames, IA	Graduated

=== Incoming transfers ===
Name	Number	Pos.	Height	Weight	Year	Hometown	Previous school
Nick Honor	4	G	5'10"	190	Sophomore	Orlando, FL	Transferred from Fordham. Under NCAA transfer rules, Honor will have to sit out the 2019–20 season. Will have three years of remaining eligibility.
Curran Scott	10	G	6'4"	208	(redshirt) Senior	Edmond, OK	Transferred from Tulsa. Will be eligible to play immediately since Scott graduated from Tulsa.
Tevin Mack	13	G/F	6'7"	223	(redshirt) Senior	Columbia, SC	Transferred from Alabama. Will be eligible to play immediately since Mack graduated from Alabama.
Khavon Moore	21	F	6'7"	215	Sophomore	Macon, GA	Transferred from Texas Tech. Under NCAA transfer rules, Moore will have to sit out the 2019–20 season, but was granted a waiver to play immediately.

=== 2019 recruiting class ===
College recruiting
Name	Hometown	School	Height	Weight	Commit date
Al-Amir Dawes; PG	Newark, NJ	The Patrick School	6 ft 1 in (1.85 m)	170 lb (77 kg)	Oct 11, 2018
Al-Amir Dawes; PG	Recruit ratings: Scout: Rivals: 247Sports: ESPN: (83)				
Chase Hunter; SG	Atlanta, GA	Westlake High School	6 ft 3 in (1.91 m)	180 lb (82 kg)	Aug 22, 2018
Chase Hunter; SG	Recruit ratings: Scout: Rivals: 247Sports: ESPN: (82)				
Alex Hemenway; SG	Newburgh, IN	Castle High School	6 ft 3 in (1.91 m)	170 lb (77 kg)	Nov 4, 2018
Alex Hemenway; SG	Recruit ratings: Scout: Rivals: 247Sports: ESPN: (NR)				
Overall recruit ranking: Scout: 43 Rivals: 70 ESPN: NA
Note: In many cases, Scout, Rivals, 247Sports, On3, and ESPN may conflict in their listings of height and weight.; In these cases, the average was taken. ESPN grades are on a 100-point scale.; Sources: "2019 Clemson Basketball Commitment List". Rivals.; "2019 Clemson Basketball Recruiting Commits". Scout.; "Clemson Tigers". ESPN.; "Scout.com Team Recruiting Rankings". Scout.; "2019 Team Ranking". Rivals.

=== World University Games ===
On August 15, 2018 it was announced that Clemson would represent Team USA in men's basketball at the 2019 Summer Universiade (World University Games) in Naples, Italy. The Tigers competed from July 3–11, 2019 in a 16 team, 4 pool qualification followed by two 8 team brackets - one to determine 1st-8th place, the second determining 9th-16th place.

Clemson, as Team USA, was placed in Pool C with China, Finland, and Ukraine. The Tigers would go 3–0 in pool play to qualify for the 1st-8th classification bracket. Clemson would then proceed to go 3–0 in the main bracket to go undefeated for the tournament and capture the gold medal, giving the United States its 15th gold medal in men's basketball at the event.

- July 4 - USA 69, Finland 65 (pool C)
- July 5 - USA 58, Ukraine 57 (pool C)
- July 6 - USA 99, China 70 (pool C)
- July 8 - USA 76, Germany 74 (quarterfinal)
- July 9 - USA 75, Israel 73 (semifinal)
- July 11 - USA 85, Ukraine 63 (gold-medal game)

== Roster ==
2019–20 Clemson Tigers men's basketball team
Players
Coaches

Pos.	#	Name	Height	Weight	Year	Hometown
G	0	Clyde Trapp	6 ft 4 in (1.93 m)	194 lb (88 kg)	Jr	Columbia, South Carolina
F	1	Jonathan Baehre	6 ft 10 in (2.08 m)	209 lb (95 kg)	RS Jr	Hessen, Germany
G	2	Al-Amir Dawes	6 ft 2 in (1.88 m)	180 lb (82 kg)	Fr	Trenton, New Jersey
G	3	Chase Hunter	6 ft 3 in (1.91 m)	200 lb (91 kg)	Fr	Atlanta, Georgia
G	4	Nick Honor (redshirt)	5 ft 10 in (1.78 m)	205 lb (93 kg)	So	Orlando, Florida
F	5	Hunter Tyson	6 ft 8 in (2.03 m)	211 lb (96 kg)	So	Monroe, North Carolina
G	10	Curran Scott	6 ft 4 in (1.93 m)	205 lb (93 kg)	RS Sr	Edmond, Oklahoma
G	11	Parker Fox (W)	6 ft 6 in (1.98 m)	202 lb (92 kg)	So	Watkinsville, Georgia
G	12	Alex Hemenway	6 ft 3 in (1.91 m)	180 lb (82 kg)	Fr	Newburgh, Indiana
G/F	13	Tevin Mack	6 ft 6 in (1.98 m)	227 lb (103 kg)	RS Sr	Columbia, South Carolina
G	15	John Newman III	6 ft 5 in (1.96 m)	197 lb (89 kg)	So	Greensboro, North Carolina
F	20	O'Neil McBride (W)	6 ft 7 in (2.01 m)	195 lb (88 kg)	Fr	Myrtle Beach, South Carolina
F	21	Khavon Moore	6 ft 8 in (2.03 m)	217 lb (98 kg)	So	Macon, Georgia
F	25	Aamir Simms	6 ft 8 in (2.03 m)	240 lb (109 kg)	Jr	Palmyra, Virginia
F	30	Paul Grinde (W)	6 ft 10 in (2.08 m)	300 lb (136 kg)	RS Sr	Virginia Beach, Virginia
C	55	Trey Jemison	7 ft 0 in (2.13 m)	256 lb (116 kg)	So	Birmingham, Alabama

Head coach

- Brad Brownell (DePauw)

Assistant coach(es)

- Antonio Reynolds Dean (Rhode Island)
- Dick Bender (McDaniel)
- Anthony Goins (St. John's)

Legend

- (C) Team captain
- (S) Suspended
- (I) Ineligible
- (W) Walk-on
- Injured
- Current redshirt

Roster

== Schedule and results ==
Date time, TV	Rank^{#}	Opponent^{#}	Result	Record	High points	High rebounds	High assists	Site (attendance) city, state
Exhibition
October 30, 2019*; 7:00 pm		Anderson	W 75–48	–	16 – Simms	10 – Simms	3 – Tied	Littlejohn Coliseum; Clemson, SC
Regular season
November 5, 2019; 7:00 pm, ESPNU		Virginia Tech	L 60–67	0–1 (0–1)	15 – Newman III	15 – Simms	2 – Tied	Littlejohn Coliseum (7,500); Clemson, SC
November 7, 2019*; 7:00 pm, ACCN		Presbyterian	W 79–45	1–1	16 – Newman III	8 – Simms	4 – Hunter	Littlejohn Coliseum (5,713); Clemson, SC
November 10, 2019*; 3:00 pm, ACCNX		Colgate	W 81–68	2–1	17 – Mack	9 – Mack	4 – Dawes	Littlejohn Coliseum (5,673); Clemson, SC
November 17, 2019*; 3:00 pm, ACCNX		Detroit Mercy; MGM Resorts Main Event Campus Site Game	W 87–65	3–1	20 – Tyson	8 – Simms	6 – Dawes	Littlejohn Coliseum (5,804); Clemson, SC
November 21, 2019*; 7:00 pm, ACCNX		Alabama A&M	W 87–51	4–1	19 – Dawes	9 – Tyson	4 – Tied	Littlejohn Coliseum (5,616); Clemson, SC
November 24, 2019*; 10:30 pm, ESPN2		vs. TCU; MGM Resorts Main Event Heavyweight semifinals	W 62–60 ^{OT}	5–1	22 – Mack	12 – Simms	7 – Simms	T-Mobile Arena; Paradise, NV
November 26, 2019*; 11:30 pm, ESPN2		vs. No. 21 Colorado; MGM Resorts Main Event Heavyweight championship game	L 67–71	5–2	23 – Simms	9 – Mack	6 – Dawes	T-Mobile Arena; Paradise, NV
December 2, 2019*; 9:00 pm, ESPN2		at Minnesota; ACC–Big Ten Challenge	L 60–78	5–3	12 – Tyson	6 – Tied	2 – Tied	Williams Arena (10,148); Minneapolis, MN
December 8, 2019; 2:00 pm, ACCN		at No. 17 Florida State	L 53–72	5–4 (0–2)	14 – Mack	4 – 3 tied	3 – Dawes	Donald L. Tucker Center (7,834); Tallahassee, FL
December 15, 2019*; 5:00 pm, ESPN2		South Carolina; Rivalry	L 54–67	5–5	21 – Simms	8 – Simms	5 – Dawes	Littlejohn Coliseum (6,394); Clemson, SC
December 20, 2019*; 9:00 pm, ACCN		Jacksonville	W 68–39	6–5	18 – Simms	11 – Mack	4 – Dawes	Littlejohn Coliseum (5,632); Clemson, SC
December 22, 2019*; 4:00 pm, ACCN		Yale	L 45–54	6–6	11 – Tyson	7 – Simms	1 – 4 tied	Littlejohn Coliseum (5,632); Clemson, SC
December 31, 2019; 4:00 pm, ACCN		Miami (FL)	L 68–73 ^{OT}	6–7 (0–3)	21 – Simms	8 – Simms	4 – Tied	Littlejohn Coliseum (5,549); Clemson, SC
January 4, 2020; 12:00 pm, ACCN		NC State	W 81–70	7–7 (1–3)	17 – Simms	7 – Mack	5 – Simms	Littlejohn Coliseum (6,908); Clemson, SC
January 11, 2020; 4:30 pm, ACCRSN		at North Carolina	W 79–76 ^{OT}	8–7 (2–3)	20 – Simms	8 – Simms	6 – Simms	Dean Smith Center (21,077); Chapel Hill, NC
January 14, 2020; 7:00 pm, ESPN		No. 3 Duke	W 79–72	9–7 (3–3)	25 – Simms	9 – Simms	5 – Tied	Littlejohn Coliseum (8,494); Clemson, SC
January 18, 2020; 2:00 pm, ACCRSN		at NC State	L 54–60	9–8 (3–4)	18 – Simms	11 – Simms	4 – Scott	PNC Arena (16,553); Raleigh, NC
January 21, 2020; 8:00 pm, ACCN		Wake Forest	W 71–68	10–8 (4–4)	21 – Tyson	8 – Trapp	4 – Trapp	Littlejohn Coliseum (6,951); Clemson, SC
January 25, 2020; 2:00 pm, ACCRSN		at No. 6 Louisville	L 62–80	10–9 (4–5)	11 – Trapp	8 – Mack	5 – Simms	KFC Yum! Center (17,654); Louisville, KY
January 28, 2020; 7:00 pm, ACCRSN		Syracuse	W 71–70	11–9 (5–5)	32 – Mack	10 – Mack	6 – Trapp	Littlejohn Coliseum (6,402); Clemson, SC
February 1, 2020; 8:00 pm, ACCN		at Wake Forest	L 44–56	11–10 (5–6)	14 – Simms	8 – Simms	4 – Newman III	LJVM Coliseum (7,113); Winston-Salem, NC
February 5, 2020; 7:00 pm, ACCRSN		at Virginia	L 44–51	11–11 (5–7)	16 – Simms	8 – Dawes	3 – Newman III	John Paul Jones Arena (13,580); Charlottesville, VA
February 9, 2020; 6:00 pm, ACCN		Notre Dame	L 57–61	11–12 (5–8)	16 – Tied	7 – Jemison	4 – Trapp	Littlejohn Coliseum (7,472); Clemson, SC
February 12, 2020; 9:00 pm, ACCRSN		at Pittsburgh	W 72–52	12–12 (6–8)	18 – Dawes	9 – Mack	5 – 3 tied	Petersen Events Center (7,530); Pittsburgh, PA
February 15, 2020; 4:00 pm, ACCN		No. 5 Louisville	W 77–62	13–12 (7–8)	23 – Newman III	9 – Trapp	6 – Simms	Littlejohn Coliseum (9,146); Clemson, SC
February 22, 2020; 6:00 pm, ACCN		at Boston College	W 82–64	14–12 (8–8)	22 – Dawes	11 – Simms	4 – Tied	Conte Forum (6,431); Chestnut Hill, MA
February 25, 2020; 9:00 pm, ACCN		at Georgia Tech	L 59–68	14–13 (8–9)	23 – Simms	5 – Tied	4 – Tied	McCamish Pavilion (4,763); Atlanta, GA
February 29, 2019; 2:00 pm, ACCRSN		No. 6 Florida State	W 70–69	15–13 (9–9)	18 – Newman III	8 – Simms	4 – Dawes	Littlejohn Coliseum (9,095); Clemson, SC
March 4, 2020; 7:00 pm, ACCN		at Virginia Tech	L 58–70	15–14 (9–10)	12 – Mack	6 – Mack	4 – Newman III	Cassell Coliseum (8,901); Blacksburg, VA
March 6, 2020; 7:00 pm, ESPN2		Georgia Tech	L 62–65	15–15 (9–11)	19 – Mack	8 – Simms	4 – Trapp	Littlejohn Coliseum (8,188); Clemson, SC
ACC Men's tournament
March 11, 2020; 12:00 p.m., ESPN	(8)	vs. (9) Miami (FL); Second round	W 69–64	16–15	18 – Dawes	10 – Simms	4 – Simms	Greensboro Coliseum; Greensboro, NC
March 12, 2020; 12:30 p.m., ESPN	(8)	vs. (1) No. 4 Florida State; Quarterfinals	ACC Tournament Canceled					Greensboro Coliseum; Greensboro, NC
*Non-conference game. ^{#}Rankings from AP Poll. (#) Tournament seedings in parentheses. All times are in Eastern Time.

== Rankings ==
Ranking movements
	Week																			
Poll	Pre	1	2	3	4	5	6	7	8	9	10	11	12	13	14	15	16	17	18	Final
AP																				Not released
Coaches																				

*AP does not release post-NCAA tournament rankings
^Coaches did not release a Week 2 poll.

== See also ==
- 2019–20 Clemson Tigers women's basketball team
