= 2019–20 Boston College Eagles men's basketball team =

American college basketball season

2019–20 Boston College Eagles men's basketball
- Conference: Atlantic Coast Conference
- Record: 13–19 (7–13 ACC)
- Head coach: Jim Christian (6th season)
- Assistant coaches: Scott Spinelli; Bill Wuczynski; Chris Cheeks
- Home arena: Conte Forum

2019–20 ACC men's basketball standings
	Conf.				Overall
Team	W		L	PCT	W		L	PCT
No. 4 Florida State	16	–	4	.800	26	–	5	.839
No. 16 Virginia	15	–	5	.750	23	–	7	.767
No. 14 Louisville	15	–	5	.750	24	–	7	.774
No. 11 Duke	15	–	5	.750	25	–	6	.806
Georgia Tech*	11	–	9	.550	17	–	14	.548
NC State	10	–	10	.500	20	–	12	.625
Syracuse	10	–	10	.500	18	–	14	.563
Notre Dame	10	–	10	.500	20	–	12	.625
Clemson	9	–	11	.450	16	–	15	.516
Miami (FL)	7	–	13	.350	15	–	16	.484
Boston College	7	–	13	.350	13	–	18	.419
Virginia Tech	7	–	13	.350	16	–	16	.500
Wake Forest	6	–	14	.300	13	–	18	.419
Pittsburgh	6	–	14	.300	16	–	17	.485
North Carolina	6	–	14	.300	14	–	19	.424
*Ineligible for postseason due to NCAA violations. Note: The 2020 ACC tournament was cancelled before the quarterfinals due to the COVID-19 pandemic. Rankings from AP poll

The 2019–20 Boston College Eagles men's basketball team represented Boston College during the 2019–20 NCAA Division I men's basketball season. The Eagles, led by sixth-year head coach Jim Christian, played their home games at the Conte Forum as members of the Atlantic Coast Conference.

The Eagles finished the season 13–19, and 7–13 in ACC play. They lost to Notre Dame in the second round of the ACC tournament. The tournament was cancelled before the Quarterfinals due to the COVID-19 pandemic. The NCAA tournament and NIT were also cancelled due to the pandemic.

== Previous season ==
The Eagles finished the 2018–19 season finished the season 14–17, 5–13 in ACC play to finish in a tie for 11th place. In the ACC tournament they lost in the first round to Pittsburgh.

== Offseason ==
=== Departures ===
Name	Number	Pos.	Height	Weight	Year	Hometown	Reason for departure
Ky Bowman	0	G	6'1"	188	Junior	Havelock, NC	Play professionally
Avery Wilson	2	G	6'3"	219	Sophomore	Forest Park, GA	Transferred to Southeastern Louisiana
Ervins Meznieks	10	F	6'7"	228	Senior	Riga, Latvia	Graduated
Vin Baker Jr.	11	F	6'7"	184	Sophomore	Old Saybrook, CT	Transferred to Milwaukee
John Carlos Reyes	12	F/C	6'10"	214	RS Junior	Lawrenceville, GA	Graduate transferred to Nevada
Gordon Gehan	20	G/F	6'5"	220	Senior	Dallas, TX	Walk-on; graduated
Jordan Chatman	25	G	6'5"	200	RS Senior	Vancouver, WA	Graduated
Mac Bohuny	55	G/F	6'4"	175	Sophomore	Ridgewood, NJ	Walk-on; left the team for personal reasons

=== Incoming transfers ===
Name	Number	Pos.	Height	Weight	Year	Hometown	Previous School
Makai Ashton-Langford	4	G	6'3"	185	Junior	Worcester, MA	Transferred from Providence. Under NCAA transfer rules, Ashton-Langford will have to sit out for the 2019–20 season. Will have two years of remaining eligibility.
Derryck Thornton	11	G	6'2"	195	Graduate Student	Los Angeles, CA	Transferred from USC. Will be eligible to play immediately since Thornton graduated from USC.

=== Recruiting class of 2019 ===
College recruiting information
Name	Hometown	School	Height	Weight	Commit date
Jay Heath Jr. SG	Washington, DC	Woodrow Wilson High School	6 ft 3 in (1.91 m)	175 lb (79 kg)	Jun 27, 2018
Jay Heath Jr. SG	Recruit ratings: Scout: Rivals: 247Sports: ESPN:				
Julian Rishwain; SG	Sherman Oaks, CA	Notre Dame High School	6 ft 5 in (1.96 m)	190 lb (86 kg)	Oct 7, 2018
Julian Rishwain; SG	Recruit ratings: Scout: Rivals: 247Sports: ESPN:				
Kamari Williams; SF	Sandy Spring, MD	St. Andrews Episcopal School	6 ft 7 in (2.01 m)	200 lb (91 kg)	Sep 19, 2018
Kamari Williams; SF	Recruit ratings: Scout: Rivals: 247Sports: ESPN:				
Calvin Felder; SF	Sumter, SC	Sumter High School	6 ft 7 in (2.01 m)	230 lb (100 kg)	Oct 19, 2018
Calvin Felder; SF	Recruit ratings: Scout: Rivals: 247Sports: ESPN:				
Overall recruit ranking:
Note: In many cases, Scout, Rivals, 247Sports, On3, and ESPN may conflict in their listings of height and weight.; In these cases, the average was taken. ESPN grades are on a 100-point scale.; Sources: "2019 Team Ranking". Rivals.

=== Recruiting class of 2020 ===
College recruiting information (2020)
Name	Hometown	School	Height	Weight	Commit date
Demarr Langford; SF	Wolfeboro, NH	Brewster Academy	6 ft 4 in (1.93 m)	185 lb (84 kg)	Sep 21, 2019
Demarr Langford; SF	Recruit ratings: Scout: Rivals: 247Sports: ESPN:				
Justin Vander Baan; C	Whitinsville, MA	Whitinsville Christian High School	7 ft 0 in (2.13 m)	215 lb (98 kg)	Aug 28, 2019
Justin Vander Baan; C	Recruit ratings: Scout: Rivals: 247Sports: ESPN:				
Overall recruit ranking:
Note: In many cases, Scout, Rivals, 247Sports, On3, and ESPN may conflict in their listings of height and weight.; In these cases, the average was taken. ESPN grades are on a 100-point scale.; Sources: "2020 Team Ranking". Rivals.

== Roster ==
2019–20 Boston College Eagles men's basketball team
Players
Coaches

Pos.	#	Name	Height	Weight	Year	Previous school	Hometown
F	0	C. J. Felder	6 ft 7 in (2.01 m)	230 lb (104 kg)	Fr	Sumter High School	Sumter, South Carolina
F	1	Jairus Hamilton	6 ft 8 in (2.03 m)	234 lb (106 kg)	So	Cannon School	Charlotte, North Carolina
G	2	Julian Rishwain	6 ft 5 in (1.96 m)	190 lb (86 kg)	Fr	Notre Dame High School	Sherman Oaks, California
G	3	Jared Hamilton	6 ft 4 in (1.93 m)	203 lb (92 kg)	RS Sr	Georgia Southern	Charlotte, North Carolina
G	4	Makai Ashton-Langford (redshirt)	6 ft 3 in (1.91 m)	185 lb (84 kg)	Jr	Providence	Worcester, Massachusetts
G	5	Jay Heath	6 ft 3 in (1.91 m)	175 lb (79 kg)	Fr	Woodrow Wilson High School	Washington, D.C.
G	10	Wynston Tabbs	6 ft 2 in (1.88 m)	193 lb (88 kg)	So	St. Mary's Ryken High School	Leonardtown, Maryland
G	11	Derryck Thornton	6 ft 2 in (1.88 m)	195 lb (88 kg)	GS	USC	Los Angeles, California
F/C	13	Luka Kraljević	6 ft 10 in (2.08 m)	228 lb (103 kg)	Jr	Don Bosco Prep	Domžale, Slovenia
F	14	Kamari Williams	6 ft 7 in (2.01 m)	200 lb (91 kg)	Fr	St. Andrew's Episcopal School	Sandy Spring, Maryland
F	21	Nik Popovic	6 ft 11 in (2.11 m)	253 lb (115 kg)	Sr	Sagemont School	Banja Luka, Bosnia and Herzegovina
G	22	Matt DiLuccio (W)	5 ft 11 in (1.8 m)	180 lb (82 kg)	Sr	South Side High School	Rockville Centre, New York
F	23	Andrew Kenny (W)	6 ft 6 in (1.98 m)	205 lb (93 kg)	Fr	Choate Rosemary Hall	Seattle, Washington
G	24	Chris Herren Jr.	6 ft 3 in (1.91 m)	174 lb (79 kg)	So	Tabor Academy	Portsmouth, Rhode Island
G	25	Jonathan Noel (W)	6 ft 2 in (1.88 m)	195 lb (88 kg)	Fr	St. Mark's School	Everett, Massachusetts
G	30	Sam Holtze (W)	5 ft 10 in (1.78 m)	150 lb (68 kg)	Jr	Notre Dame	Manhattan Beach, California
F	41	Steffon Mitchell	6 ft 8 in (2.03 m)	220 lb (100 kg)	Jr	Sunrise Christian Academy	Shakopee, Minnesota

Head coach

- Jim Christian (Rhode Island)

Assistant coach(es)

- Scott Spinelli (Boston University)
- Bill Wuczynski (UNLV)
- Chris Cheeks (VCU)

Legend

- (C) Team captain
- (S) Suspended
- (I) Ineligible
- (W) Walk-on
- Injured
- Current redshirt

Roster

== Schedule and results ==
Date time, TV	Rank^{#}	Opponent^{#}	Result	Record	High points	High rebounds	High assists	Site (attendance) city, state
Regular season
November 6, 2019; 6:00 pm, ESPNU		Wake Forest	W 77–70	1–0 (1–0)	23 – Thornton	9 – Mitchell	4 – Tied	Conte Forum (4,815); Chestnut Hill, MA
November 10, 2019*; 12:00 pm, CBSSN		at South Florida	W 74–60	2–0	22 – Thornton	13 – Mitchell	6 – Mitchell	Yuengling Center (3,191); Tampa, FL
November 13, 2019*; 7:00 pm, ACCNX		High Point; Gotham Classic	W 59–33	3–0	14 – Heath	10 – Mitchell	5 – Thornton	Conte Forum (4,710); Chestnut Hill, MA
November 16, 2019*; 2:00 pm, ACCN		Belmont; Gotham Classic	L 85–100	3–1	23 – Popovic	6 – Mitchell	7 – Thornton	Conte Forum (5,540); Chestnut Hill, MA
November 20, 2019*; 7:00 pm, ACCNX		Eastern Washington; Gotham Classic	W 72–68	4–1	17 – Heath	12 – Popovic	5 – Thornton	Conte Forum (4,133); Chestnut Hill, MA
November 23, 2019*; 12:00 pm, ACCNX		DePaul	L 67–72	4–2	16 – Thornton	9 – Mitchell	3 – 3 tied	Conte Forum (4,560); Chestnut Hill, MA
November 27, 2019*; 2:00 pm, ACCN		Saint Louis; Gotham Classic	L 54–64	4–3	18 – Thornton	8 – Tied	5 – Thornton	Conte Forum (4,265); Chestnut Hill, MA
November 30, 2019*; 2:30 pm, NBCSN		at Richmond	L 44–64	4–4	14 – Heath	9 – Mitchell	3 – Tied	Robins Center (5,531); Richmond, VA
December 3, 2019*; 7:00 pm, ESPNU		Northwestern; ACC–Big Ten Challenge	L 64–82	4–5	12 – Hamilton	4 – Tied	3 – 3 tied	Conte Forum (4,004); Chestnut Hill, MA
December 7, 2019; 2:00 pm, ESPNU		at Notre Dame	W 73–72	5–5 (2–0)	19 – Thornton	11 – Mitchell	4 – Thornton	Edmund P. Joyce Center (7,117); South Bend, IN
December 10, 2019*; 7:00 pm, ACCNX		Albany	W 72–51	6–5	16 – Hamilton	13 – Mitchell	6 – Heath	Conte Forum (3,874); Chestnut Hill, MA
December 15, 2019*; 1:00 pm, ACCNX		Central Connecticut	W 74–55	7–5	18 – Hamilton	12 – Mitchell	3 – 3 tied	Conte Forum (3,963); Chestnut Hill, MA
December 21, 2019*; 5:30 pm, P12N		vs. California; Al Attles Classic	W 64–60	8–5	18 – Hamilton	8 – Hamilton	5 – Mitchell	Chase Center (6,209); San Francisco, CA
December 31, 2019; 6:00 pm, ACCN		at No. 2 Duke	L 49–88	8–6 (2–1)	13 – Felder	6 – Tied	3 – Mitchell	Cameron Indoor Stadium (9,314); Durham, NC
January 7, 2020; 7:00 pm, ACCN		No. 18 Virginia	W 60–53	9–6 (3–1)	17 – Heath	7 – Tied	2 – Tied	Conte Forum (5,781); Chestnut Hill, MA
January 11, 2020; 6:00 pm, ACCN		Georgia Tech	L 52–71	9–7 (3–2)	13 – Felder	11 – Mitchell	3 – Heath	Conte Forum (6,217); Chestnut Hill, MA
January 15, 2020; 6:30 pm, ACCN		at Syracuse	L 50–76	9–8 (3–3)	9 – Tied	9 – Felder	3 – Tied	Carrier Dome (21,645); Syracuse, NY
January 19, 2020; 6:00 pm, ACCN		at Wake Forest	L 62–80	9–9 (3–4)	15 – Thornton	5 – Tied	3 – Tied	LJVM Coliseum (6,872); Winston-Salem, NC
January 22, 2020; 9:00 pm, ACCRSN		at Pittsburgh	L 72–74	9–10 (3–5)	16 – Heath	6 – Tied	7 – Thornton	Peterson Events Center (7,230); Pittsburgh, PA
January 25, 2020; 2:00 pm, ESPNU		Virginia Tech	W 61–56	10–10 (4–5)	23 – Hamilton	10 – Mitchell	5 – Mitchell	Conte Forum (6,981); Chestnut Hill, MA
January 29, 2020; 9:00 pm, ACCN		No. 6 Louisville	L 69–86	10–11 (4–6)	17 – Thornton	9 – Mitchell	4 – Thornton	Conte Forum (5,771); Chestnut Hill, MA
February 1, 2020; 6:00 pm, ACCN		at North Carolina	W 71–70	11–11 (5–6)	18 – Hamilton	8 – Tied	6 – Heath	Dean Smith Center (21,492); Chapel Hill, NC
February 4, 2020; 7:00 pm, ESPN		No. 7 Duke	L 55–63	11–12 (5–7)	21 – Thornton	12 – Mitchell	3 – Tied	Conte Forum (8,606); Chestnut Hill, MA
February 8, 2020; 12:00 pm, ACCRSN		at Virginia Tech	W 77–73 ^{OT}	12–12 (6–7)	21 – Mitchell	15 – Mitchell	6 – Mitchell	Cassell Coliseum (9,275); Blacksburg, VA
February 12, 2020; 7:00 pm, ACCRSN		at Miami (FL)	L 58–85	12–13 (6–8)	14 – Williams	6 – Tied	6 – Popovic	Watsco Center (5,465); Coral Gables, FL
February 16, 2020; 6:00 pm, ACCN		NC State	W 71–68	13–13 (7–8)	22 – Thornton	8 – Popovic	5 – Thornton	Conte Forum (6,304); Chestnut Hill, MA
February 19, 2020; 6:00 pm, ACCN		at Virginia	L 65–78	13–14 (7–9)	22 – Popovic	8 – Mitchell	4 – Heath	John Paul Jones Arena (13,819); Charlottesville, VA
February 22, 2020; 6:00 pm, ACCN		Clemson	L 64–82	13–15 (7–10)	16 – Heath	7 – Mitchell	3 – Tied	Conte Forum (6,431); Chestnut Hill, MA
February 26, 2020; 9:00 pm, ACCN		Notre Dame	L 61–62	13–16 (7–11)	12 – Tied	11 – Mitchell	9 – Mitchell	Conte Forum (5,101); Chestnut Hill, MA
March 3, 2020; 7:00 pm, ESPN2		Syracuse	L 71–84	13–17 (7–12)	18 – Thornton	11 – Mitchell	10 – Mitchell	Conte Forum (6,471); Chestnut Hill, MA
March 7, 2020; 4:30 pm, ACCRSN		at No. 7 Florida State	L 62–80	13–18 (7–13)	13 – Thornton	9 – Mitchell	3 – Tied	Donald L. Tucker Center (11,500); Tallahassee, FL
ACC tournament
March 11, 2020; 7:00 pm, ESPN2	(10)	vs. (7) Notre Dame; Second round	L 58–80	13–19	20 – Mitchell	13 – Mitchell	4 – Heath	Greensboro Coliseum (20,809); Greensboro, NC
*Non-conference game. ^{#}Rankings from AP Poll. (#) Tournament seedings in parentheses. All times are in Eastern Time.
