= 2019–20 Notre Dame Fighting Irish men's basketball team =

American college basketball season

2019–20 Notre Dame Fighting Irish men's basketball
- Conference: Atlantic Coast Conference
- Record: 20–12 (10–10 ACC)
- Head coach: Mike Brey (20th season)
- Assistant coaches: Rod Balanis; Ryan Ayers; Ryan Humphrey
- Home arena: Edmund P. Joyce Center

2019–20 ACC men's basketball standings
	Conf.				Overall
Team	W		L	PCT	W		L	PCT
No. 4 Florida State	16	–	4	.800	26	–	5	.839
No. 16 Virginia	15	–	5	.750	23	–	7	.767
No. 14 Louisville	15	–	5	.750	24	–	7	.774
No. 11 Duke	15	–	5	.750	25	–	6	.806
Georgia Tech*	11	–	9	.550	17	–	14	.548
NC State	10	–	10	.500	20	–	12	.625
Syracuse	10	–	10	.500	18	–	14	.563
Notre Dame	10	–	10	.500	20	–	12	.625
Clemson	9	–	11	.450	16	–	15	.516
Miami (FL)	7	–	13	.350	15	–	16	.484
Boston College	7	–	13	.350	13	–	18	.419
Virginia Tech	7	–	13	.350	16	–	16	.500
Wake Forest	6	–	14	.300	13	–	18	.419
Pittsburgh	6	–	14	.300	16	–	17	.485
North Carolina	6	–	14	.300	14	–	19	.424
*Ineligible for postseason due to NCAA violations. Note: The 2020 ACC tournament was cancelled before the quarterfinals due to the COVID-19 pandemic. Rankings from AP poll

The 2019–20 Notre Dame Fighting Irish men's basketball team represented the University of Notre Dame during the 2019–20 NCAA Division I men's basketball season. The Fighting Irish were led by 20th-year head coach Mike Brey and played their home games at Edmund P. Joyce Center in South Bend, Indiana as seventh-year members of the Atlantic Coast Conference.

The Fighting Irish finished the season 20–12, and 10–10 in ACC play. The team was scheduled to play Virginia in the quarterfinals of the ACC tournament before the tournament was cancelled due to the COVID-19 pandemic. The NCAA tournament and NIT were also cancelled due to the pandemic.

== Previous season ==
The Fighting Irish finished the 2018–19 season 14–19, 4–14 in ACC play to finish in a tie for last place. As the No. 15 seed in the ACC tournament, they defeated Georgia Tech in the first round before losing to Louisville in the second round.

== Offseason ==
=== Departures ===
Name	Number	Pos.	Height	Weight	Year	Hometown	Reason for departure
D. J. Harvey	5	G/F	6'6"	225	Sophomore	Bowie, MD	Transferred to Vanderbilt
Elijah Burns	12	F	6'8"	237	RS Junior	Troy, NY	Transferred to Siena
Liam Nelligan	25	G	6'5"	198	RS Senior	La Grange Park, IL	Walk-on; graduated

=== Incoming transfers ===
Name	Number	Pos.	Height	Weight	Year	Hometown	Previous School
Cormac Ryan	5	G	6'5"	190	Sophomore	New York, NY	Stanford

=== 2019 recruiting class ===
No recruits.

== Roster ==
2019–20 Notre Dame Fighting Irish men's basketball team
Players
Coaches

Pos.	#	Name	Height	Weight	Year	Previous school	Hometown
G	0	Rex Pflueger	6 ft 6 in (1.98 m)	218 lb (99 kg)	RS Sr	Mater Dei	Dana Point, CA
G	3	Prentiss Hubb	6 ft 3 in (1.91 m)	175 lb (79 kg)	So	Gonzaga	Upper Marlboro, MD
G	5	Cormac Ryan (redshirt)	6 ft 5 in (1.96 m)	190 lb (86 kg)	So	Milton Academy; Stanford	New York City, NY
G	10	T. J. Gibbs	6 ft 3 in (1.91 m)	185 lb (84 kg)	Sr	Seton Hall Prep	Scotch Plains, NJ
F	11	Juwan Durham	6 ft 11 in (2.11 m)	223 lb (101 kg)	RS Jr	Tampa Prep; Connecticut	Tampa, FL
G	13	Nikola Djogo	6 ft 7 in (2.01 m)	222 lb (101 kg)	RS Jr	Athlete Institute Prep	Hamilton, Ontario
F	14	Nate Laszewski	6 ft 10 in (2.08 m)	225 lb (102 kg)	So	Northfield Mount Hermon	Jupiter, FL
F	15	Chris Doherty	6 ft 8 in (2.03 m)	235 lb (107 kg)	So	Marlborough	Marlborough, MA
G	23	Dane Goodwin	6 ft 5 in (1.96 m)	200 lb (91 kg)	So	Upper Arlington	Upper Arlington, OH
G	24	Robby Carmody	6 ft 4 in (1.93 m)	201 lb (91 kg)	So	Mars Area	Mars, PA
G	31	Elijah Morgan (W)	6 ft 0 in (1.83 m)	165 lb (75 kg)	Fr	Jesuit High School	New Orleans, LA
F	33	John Mooney	6 ft 9 in (2.06 m)	245 lb (111 kg)	Sr	Lake Brantley	Orlando, FL

Head coach

- Mike Brey (George Washington)

Assistant coach(es)

- Rod Balanis (Georgia Tech)
- Ryan Ayers (Notre Dame)
- Ryan Humphrey (Notre Dame)

Legend

- (C) Team captain
- (S) Suspended
- (I) Ineligible
- (W) Walk-on
- Injured
- Current redshirt

Roster

== Schedule and results ==
Date time, TV	Rank^{#}	Opponent^{#}	Result	Record	High points	High rebounds	High assists	Site (attendance) city, state
Exhibition
October 29, 2019*; 7:00 pm, ACCNX		Capital	W 72–43	–	12 – Tied	11 – Mooney	6 – Hubb	Edmund P. Joyce Center (5,040); South Bend, IN
November 1, 2019*; 7:00 pm, ACCNX		Bellarmine	W 61–51	–	18 – Hubb	13 – Durham	8 – Hubb	Edmund P. Joyce Center (6,235); South Bend, IN
Regular season
November 6, 2019; 7:00 pm, ACCN		at No. 9 North Carolina	L 65–76	0–1 (0–1)	22 – Hubb	8 – Mooney	6 – Hubb	Dean Smith Center (21,750); Chapel Hill, NC
November 9, 2019*; 12:00 pm, ACCNX		Robert Morris; Men Against Breast Cancer Invitational	W 92–57	1–1	18 – Goodwin	10 – Mooney	5 – Gibbs	Edmund P. Joyce Center (6,422); South Bend, IN
November 12, 2019*; 7:00 pm, ACCNX		Howard; Men Against Breast Cancer Invitational	W 79–50	2–1	18 – Mooney	16 – Mooney	5 – Mooney	Edmund P. Joyce Center (6,190); South Bend, IN
November 15, 2019*; 7:00 pm, ACCNX		Marshall; Men Against Breast Cancer Invitational	W 74–64	3–1	28 – Mooney	16 – Mooney	4 – Hubb	Edmund P. Joyce Center (7,831); South Bend, IN
November 18, 2019*; 7:00 pm, ACCNX		Presbyterian	W 63–53	4–1	13 – Pflueger	15 – Durham	6 – Pflueger	Edmund P. Joyce Center (5,752); South Bend, IN
November 21, 2019*; 8:30 pm, ACCN		Toledo; Men Against Breast Cancer Invitational	W 64–62 ^{OT}	5–1	16 – Goodwin	15 – Mooney	5 – Pflueger	Edmund P. Joyce Center (6,555); South Bend, IN
November 26, 2019*; 7:00 pm, ACCRSN		Fairleigh Dickinson	W 91–66	6–1	16 – Laszewski	13 – Mooney	5 – Pflueger	Edmund P. Joyce Center (6,166); South Bend, IN
December 4, 2019*; 7:30 pm, ESPN		at No. 3 Maryland; ACC–Big Ten Challenge	L 51–72	6–2	17 – Mooney	12 – Mooney	3 – Hubb	Xfinity Center (15,529); College Park, MD
December 7, 2019; 2:00 p.m., ESPNU		Boston College	L 72–73	6–3 (0–2)	22 – Gibbs	18 – Mooney	6 – Gibbs	Edmund P. Joyce Center (7,117); South Bend, IN
December 10, 2019*; 7:00 pm, ACCN		Detroit Mercy	W 110–71	7–3	27 – Goodwin	11 – Mooney	11 – Hubb	Edmund P. Joyce Center (6,441); South Bend, IN
December 14, 2019*; 3:00 pm, ABC		UCLA; Rivalry	W 75–61	8–3	20 – Hubb	15 – Mooney	6 – Hubb	Edmund P. Joyce Center (8,083); South Bend, IN
December 21, 2019*; 12:00 pm, ESPN		vs. Indiana; Crossroads Classic	L 60–62	8–4	15 – Tied	10 – Tied	6 – Pflueger	Bankers Life Fieldhouse (18,538); Indianapolis, IN
December 29, 2019*; 12:00 pm, ACCNX		Alabama A&M	W 82–56	9–4	17 – Gibbs	18 – Mooney	7 – Hubb	Edmund P. Joyce Center (8,181); South Bend, IN
January 4, 2020; 4:00 pm, ESPN2		at Syracuse	W 88–87	10–4 (1–2)	28 – Mooney	14 – Mooney	9 – Hubb	Carrier Dome (19,821); Syracuse, NY
January 8, 2020; 7:00 pm, ESPN2		at NC State	L 68–73	10–5 (1–3)	24 – Hubb	14 – Mooney	6 – Gibbs	PNC Arena (16,825); Raleigh, NC
January 11, 2020; 2:00 pm, ESPN		No. 13 Louisville	L 64–67	10–6 (1–4)	15 – Mooney	19 – Mooney	8 – Hubb	Edmund P. Joyce Center (8,404); South Bend, IN
January 15, 2020; 8:30 pm, ACCN		at Georgia Tech	W 78–74	11–6 (2–4)	25 – Hubb	13 – Mooney	3 – Tied	McCamish Pavilion (5,899); Atlanta, GA
January 22, 2020; 7:00 pm, ESPN2		Syracuse	L 82–84	11–7 (2–5)	21 – Mooney	13 – Mooney	6 – Tied	Edmund P. Joyce Center (7,492); South Bend, IN
January 25, 2020; 8:00 pm, ACCN		at No. 5 Florida State	L 84–85	11–8 (2–6)	24 – Hubb	9 – Durham	4 – Tied	Donald L. Tucker Center (11,500); Tallahassee, FL
January 29, 2020; 7:00 pm, ACCN		Wake Forest	W 90–80	12–8 (3–6)	23 – Gibbs	13 – Mooney	4 – Tied	Edmund P. Joyce Center (6,402); South Bend, IN
February 1, 2020; 12:00 pm, ACCRSN		Georgia Tech	W 80–72	13–8 (4–6)	28 – Mooney	10 – Mooney	5 – Hubb	Edmund P. Joyce Center (8,240); South Bend, IN
February 5, 2020; 6:30 pm, ACCN		Pittsburgh	W 80–72	14–8 (5–6)	21 – Gibbs	10 – Mooney	7 – Hubb	Edmund P. Joyce Center (6,534); South Bend, IN
February 9, 2020; 6:00 pm, ACCN		at Clemson	W 61–57	15–8 (6–6)	18 – Pflueger	11 – Mooney	3 – 3 tied	Littlejohn Coliseum (7,472); Clemson, SC
February 11, 2020; 9:00 pm, ESPN2		at Virginia	L 49–50 ^{OT}	15–9 (6–7)	12 – Hubb	14 – Mooney	5 – Pflueger	John Paul Jones Arena (13,696); Charlottesville, VA
February 15, 2020; 4:00 pm, ESPN		at No. 7 Duke	L 60–94	15–10 (6–8)	12 – Durham	9 – Mooney	6 – Gibbs	Cameron Indoor Stadium (9,314); Durham, NC
February 17, 2020; 7:00 pm, ESPN		North Carolina	W 77–76	16–10 (7–8)	20 – Hubb	10 – Mooney	8 – Hubb	Edmund P. Joyce Center (8,150); South Bend, IN
February 23, 2020; 6:00 pm, ACCN		Miami (FL)	W 87–71	17–10 (8–8)	19 – Tied	12 – Mooney	10 – Hubb	Edmund P. Joyce Center (7,351); South Bend, IN
February 26, 2020; 9:00 pm, ACCN		at Boston College	W 62–61	18–10 (9–8)	22 – Mooney	12 – Mooney	4 – Hubb	Conte Forum (5,101); Chestnut Hill, MA
February 29, 2020; 4:00 pm, ACCRSN		at Wake Forest	L 73–84	18–11 (9–9)	24 – Mooney	17 – Mooney	4 – Hubb	LJVM Coliseum (8,870); Winston-Salem, NC
March 4, 2020; 9:00 pm, ESPN2		No. 7 Florida State	L 71–73	18–12 (9–10)	24 – Hubb	11 – Mooney	6 – Hubb	Edmund P. Joyce Center (7,165); South Bend, IN
March 7, 2020; 2:00 pm, ACCN		Virginia Tech	W 64–56	19–12 (10–10)	22 – Gibbs	13 – Mooney	6 – Hubb	Edmund P. Joyce Center (8,301); South Bend, IN
ACC tournament
March 11, 2020; 7:00 pm, ESPN2	(7)	vs. (10) Boston College; Second round	W 80–58	20–12	16 – Gibbs	11 – Mooney	9 – Hubb	Greensboro Coliseum (20,809); Greensboro, NC
March 12, 2020; 7:00 pm, ESPN	(7)	vs. (2) No. 17 Virginia; Quarterfinals	ACC Tournament Canceled					Greensboro Coliseum; Greensboro, NC
*Non-conference game. ^{#}Rankings from AP Poll. (#) Tournament seedings in parentheses. All times are in Eastern Time.

== Rankings ==
Ranking movements Legend: RV = Received votes
	Week																			
Poll	Pre	1	2	3	4	5	6	7	8	9	10	11	12	13	14	15	16	17	18	Final
AP	RV					RV														Not released
Coaches																				

*AP does not release post-NCAA Tournament rankings
