= Garrison Brooks =

American basketball player (born 1999)

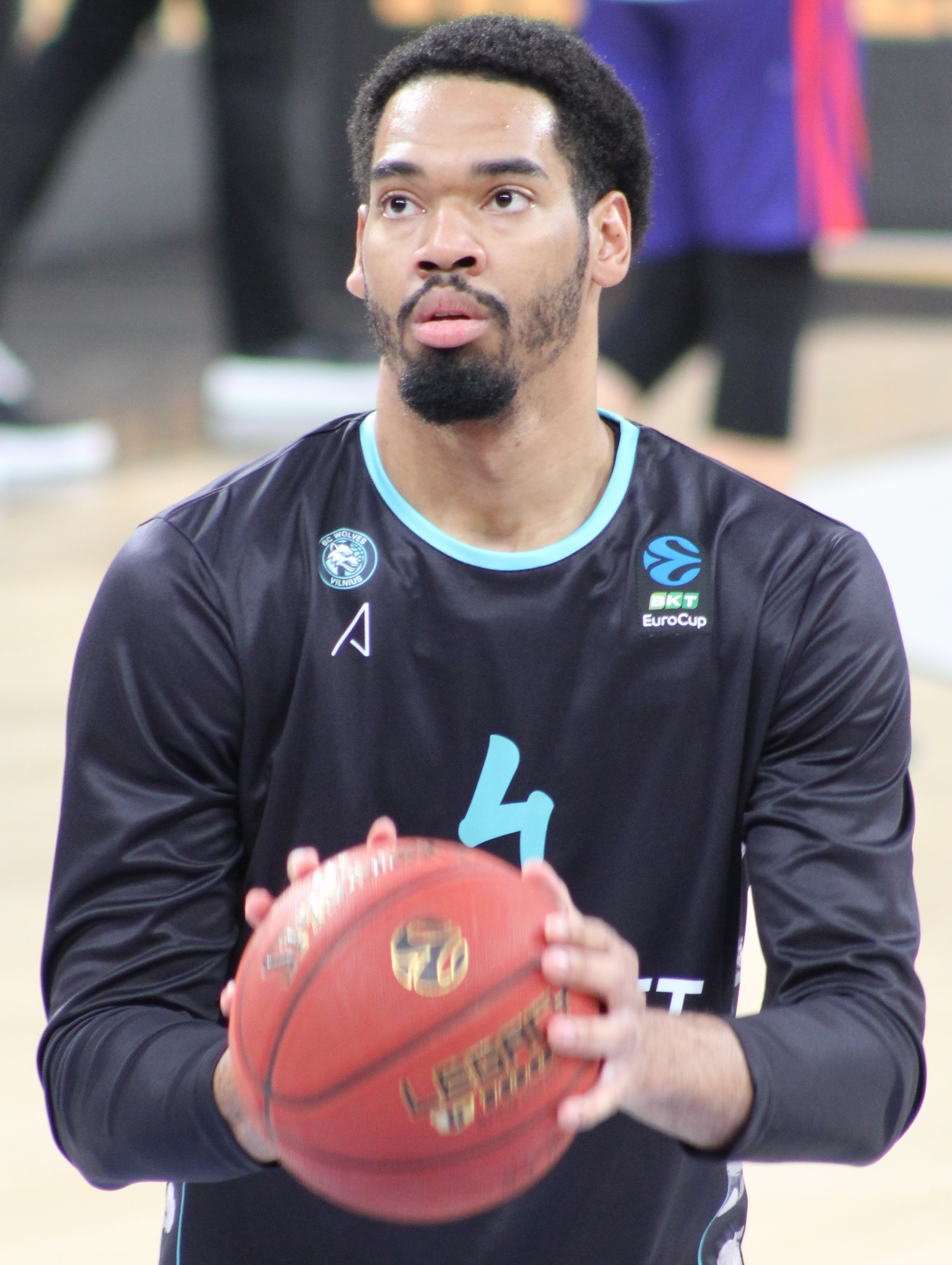
- Brooks playing for Wolves in 2024

Free agent
- Position: Center

Personal information
- Born: June 29, 1999 (age 27) Meridian, Mississippi, U.S.
- Listed height: 6 ft 9 in (2.06 m)
- Listed weight: 230 lb (104 kg)

Career information
- High school: Auburn (Auburn, Alabama)
- College: North Carolina (2017–2021); Mississippi State (2021–2022)
- NBA draft: 2022: undrafted
- Playing career: 2022–present

Career history
- 2022–2023: Westchester Knicks
- 2023: Wonju DB Promy
- 2023–2025: Wolves Twinsbet
- 2025–2026: Birmingham Squadron
- 2026: Chiba Jets Funabashi

Career highlights
- Second-team All-ACC (2020); ACC Most Improved Player (2020)
- Stats at NBA.com
- Stats at Basketball Reference

Garrison O'Neal Brooks (born June 29, 1999) is an American professional basketball player who last played for the Chiba Jets Funabashi of the B.League. He played college basketball for the North Carolina Tar Heels and the Mississippi State Bulldogs.

== High school career ==
Brooks attended Auburn High School, in his freshman year he averaged 6.6 points, 9.2 rebounds, and 0.8 assists. During his sophomore year, he averaged 14.6 points, 10.6 rebounds, and 3.7 blocks. He also averaged 16.3 points, 11.2 rebounds and 2.7 blocks in his Junior year while in his senior year, he averaged 14.3 points, 9.1 rebounds and 2.3 blocks. He made 1,457 points and grabbed 1,116 rebounds in his four years at Auburn High School which made him the second player in Auburn High history with 1,000 or more in both categories. He also broke the school record for career blocks with 334 while he was named in the first-team all-state, all-region and all-area honors

== College career ==
Brooks enrolled at North Carolina and was recruited by Roy Williams and Hubert Davis. In his freshman season, he averaged 4.5 points, 3.5 rebounds and 0.5 assists per game. In his sophomore year, he averaged 7.9 points, 5.6 rebounds and 1.3 assists per game. He worked on his mid range jumper so much after his sophomore season that he hurt his wrist.

As a junior, Brooks averaged 16.8 points and 8.5 rebounds per game. At the conclusion of the regular season, Brooks was selected to the Second Team All-ACC and was named Most Improved Player.

Entering his senior season, Brooks was named to the preseason watch lists for the John R. Wooden Award, Naismith Trophy, and Karl Malone Award. The ACC conference media selected him as the preseason ACC Player of the Year. He averaged 10.2 points and 6.9 rebounds per game as a senior. Following the season, Brooks elected to transfer to Mississippi State, where his father coached, for his final season of eligibility.

== Professional career ==
=== Westchester Knicks (2022–2023) ===
On October 23, 2022, Brooks joined the Westchester Knicks training camp roster after going undrafted in the 2022 NBA draft.

=== Wonju DB Promy (2023) ===
On July 27, 2023, Brooks signed with Wonju DB Promy of the Korean Basketball League. On October 22, Brooks made his debut in the first game of the season however injured his knee, recording 3 points, 2 rebounds and 1 assist in 4 minutes of play. On November 3, he was replaced by Jeff Withey.

=== Wolves Twinsbet (2023–2025) ===
On December 3, he signed with BC Wolves of the Lithuanian Basketball League (LKL) and the EuroCup. On July 31, he return to the BC Wolves for the 2024–25 season.

=== G League rights (2024–present) ===
On June 13, 2024, Brooks was selected by the Valley Suns with the 1st overall pick in the 2024 NBA G League expansion draft, obtaining his rights from the Westchester Knicks. On September 26, 2024, the rights to Brooks and Jahlil Okafor, the 9th overall pick from the 2024 expansion draft, were traded to the Indiana Mad Ants in exchange for the returning player rights of David Stockton.

== Career statistics ==
Legend
GP	Games played	GS	Games started	MPG	Minutes per game
FG%	Field goal percentage	3P%	3-point field goal percentage	FT%	Free throw percentage
RPG	Rebounds per game	APG	Assists per game	SPG	Steals per game
BPG	Blocks per game	PPG	Points per game	**Bold**	Career high

=== College ===
Year	Team	GP	GS	MPG	FG%	3P%	FT%	RPG	APG	SPG	BPG	PPG
2017–18	North Carolina	**37**	16	14.6	.528	–	.587	3.5	.5	.3	.3	4.5
2018–19	North Carolina	36	**36**	23.0	**.574**	–	.639	5.6	1.3	.6	.5	7.9
2019–20	North Carolina	32	31	**34.9**	.535	.286	.641	**8.5**	**2.0**	.5	.5	**16.8**
2020–21	North Carolina	28	25	28.0	.469	**.500**	.606	6.9	1.4	**.7**	**.8**	10.2
2021–22	Mississippi State	34	34	30.3	.458	.342	**.692**	6.6	.8	.4	**.8**	10.4
Career		167	142	25.7	.510	.352	.636	6.1	1.2	.5	.6	9.7

Legend
GP	Games played	GS	Games started	MPG	Minutes per game
FG%	Field-goal percentage	3P%	3-point field-goal percentage	FT%	Free-throw percentage
RPG	Rebounds per game	APG	Assists per game	SPG	Steals per game
BPG	Blocks per game	PPG	Points per game	PIR	Performance index rating
**Bold**	Career high

=== EuroCup ===
Year	Team	GP	GS	MPG	FG%	3P%	FT%	RPG	APG	SPG	BPG	PPG	PIR
2023–24	Wolves Vilnius	**9**	**1**	**14.5**	**.690**	**.0**	**.625**	**4.3**	**.3**	**.8**	**.1**	**7.6**	**8.0**
Career		9	1	14.5	.690	.0	.625	4.3	.3	.8	.1	7.6	8.0

== See also ==
- List of NCAA Division I men's basketball career games played leaders
