= Markell Johnson =

American basketball player (born 1998)

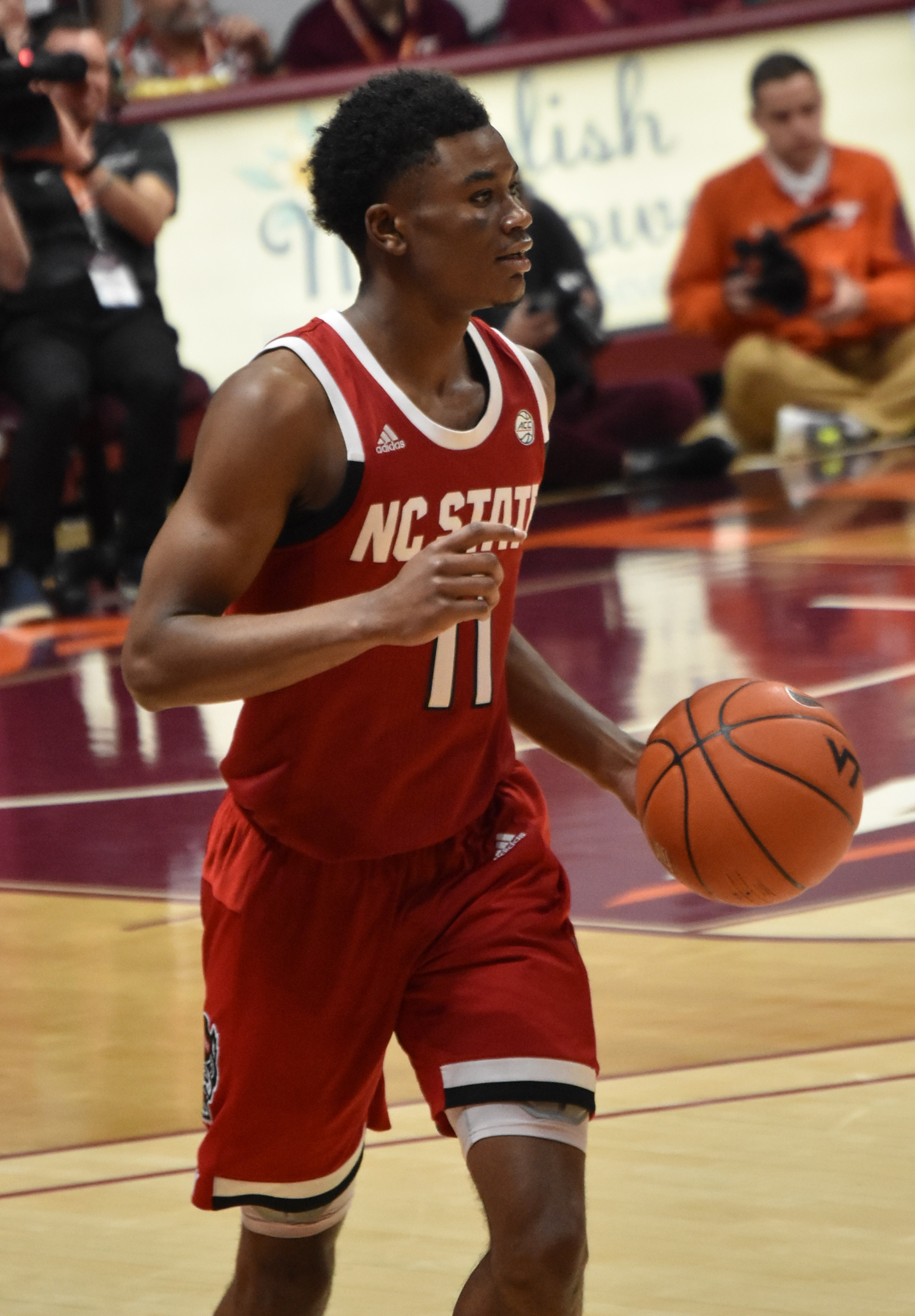
- Johnson with NC State in January 2020

No. 20 – Shenzhen Leopards
- Position: Point guard
- League: CBA

Personal information
- Born: August 25, 1998 (age 28) Cleveland, Ohio, U.S.
- Listed height: 6 ft 2 in (1.88 m)
- Listed weight: 187 lb (85 kg)

Career information
- High school: East Tech (Cleveland, Ohio)
- College: NC State (2016–2020)
- NBA draft: 2020: undrafted
- Playing career: 2020–present

Career history
- 2020–2021: Beşiktaş
- 2021–2022: Pieno žvaigždės Pasvalys
- 2022–2024: BC Astana
- 2024–2025: Shenzhen Leopards
- 2025: Bnei Herzliya
- 2025–present: Shenzhen Leopards

Career highlights
- Second-team All-ACC (2020)

Markell Davon Johnson (born August 25, 1998) is an American professional basketball player for the Shenzhen Leopards of the Chinese Basketball Association (CBA). A point guard, he played college basketball for the NC State Wolfpack. He twice led the Atlantic Coast Conference in assists.

== Early life ==
Johnson was born in Cleveland, Ohio. His mother is Sabrina Johnson; his father, who died in 2016, was Mark Thomas Sr.; his older sister is named Markishia, and his older brother is named Mark. He is 6' 2".

== High school career ==
Johnson played basketball for four years at East Technical High School in Cleveland, Ohio. As a freshman, he scored 27 points and made a game-winning jump shot with 3.1 seconds left in overtime against Lake High School to help his team reach its first state semifinal since 1972. He was considered one of the best freshman in Ohio.

In his junior season in 2015–16, Johnson averaged 31.6 points, 7.4 rebounds, and 3.5 steals per game, leading East Tech to its third straight league title and a district semifinal appearance. He was named Cleveland.com Boys Basketball Player of the Year, Northeast Lakes Division II All-District Player of the Year by the Associated Press (AP), and All-Ohio Player of the Year in Division 1.

On May 2, 2016, Johnson decided to reclassify to the 2016 class and forgo his senior year. On the Amateur Athletic Union (AAU) circuit, he played for the King James Shooting Stars, a team affiliated with NBA player LeBron James. Johnson was a consensus four-star recruit by 247Sports, ESPN, Rivals and Scout, and a top-100 overall recruit by ESPN (48), 247Sports (58), and Scout (66). He committed to play college basketball for NC State over offers from Louisville, Ohio State, Washington, and West Virginia, among others.

== College career ==
As a freshman at NC State, Johnson served as a backup to Dennis Smith Jr., who enrolled a year earlier than expected. As a sophomore he averaged 8.9 points and an Atlantic Coast Conference-leading 7.3 assists per game (5th in the NCAA). On December 19, 2018, Johnson set career-highs with 27 points and five three-pointers in a 78–71 upset of seventh-ranked Auburn. He averaged 8.9 points, 7.3 assists (leading the ACC), 3.4 rebounds, and 1.6 steals (5th) per game. He was named ACC Honorable Mention.

He missed three games as a junior with a back injury. As a junior Johnson averaged 12.6 points and 4.2 assists (6th in the ACC) per game, shooting 42.2 percent (4th) from behind the arc. After the season he declared for the 2019 NBA draft, but ultimately returned to NC State.

He injured his ankle in practice and missed the first game of his senior season, an overtime loss to Georgia Tech. Johnson hit a halfcourt buzzer beater to defeat UNC Greensboro 80–77 on December 15, 2019. On December 22, Johnson recorded a triple-double of 11 points, 10 rebounds and 10 assists in a 83–63 win over The Citadel. He became the third NC State player to ever achieve the feat, joining Dennis Smith Jr. and Julius Hodge. He was named ACC player of the week on December 23. Johnson scored a career-high 28 points and made a halfcourt shot in a 88–66 upset of sixth-ranked Duke on February 19, 2020. At the conclusion of the regular season, Johnson was selected to the Second Team All-ACC. As a senior, Johnson led the ACC in assists per game (6.8; 8th in the NCAA) for the second time in his career, while also averaging 12.8 points, 4.4 rebounds, and 1.9 steals (3rd) per game.

== Professional career ==
On August 6, 2020, Johnson signed a two-year contract with Beşiktaş of the Turkish Basketball Super League (BSL). In 2020–21 he averaged 7.0 points, 4.6 assists, and 1.2 steals per game.

In October 2021, he signed with Pieno žvaigždės Pasvalys of the Lithuanian Basketball League. Johnson averaged 12.0 points, 4.3 assists (7th in the league), and 1.4 steals (10th) per game, while shooting 42.1% from three point range (9th).

On July 5, 2022, Johnson signed with MHP Riesen Ludwigsburg of the German Basketball Bundesliga (BBL). On August 23, 2022, he was released by the club, as he failed his medical.

On November 19, 2022, Johnson signed with BC Astana of the Kazakhstan Basketball Championship. In 2022–23, he averaged 12.1 points, 4.9 assists (8th in the league), and 1.8 steals (4th) per game. On July 20, 2023, he came back to BC Astana. In 2023–24, he averaged 16.5 points (8th in the league), 7.2 assists (2nd), and 2.2 steals (leading the league) per game, while shooting 80.0% from the free throw line. On July 7, 2024, he re-signed with BC Astana. On November 4, he left BC Astana.

On November 13, 2024, he signed with Shenzhen Leopards of the Chinese Basketball Association. Johnson averaged 17.1 points, 7.7 assists (6th in the league), and 2.0 steals (8th) per game while shooting 80.4% from the free throw line.

On April 1, 2025, Johnson signed with Bnei Herzliya of the Israel Basketball Premier League, for whom he plays point guard.

== Career statistics ==
Legend
GP	Games played	GS	Games started	MPG	Minutes per game
FG%	Field goal percentage	3P%	3-point field goal percentage	FT%	Free throw percentage
RPG	Rebounds per game	APG	Assists per game	SPG	Steals per game
BPG	Blocks per game	PPG	Points per game	**Bold**	Career high

=== College ===
Year	Team	GP	GS	MPG	FG%	3P%	FT%	RPG	APG	SPG	BPG	PPG
2016–17	NC State	30	3	20.4	.377	.250	.577	1.6	2.3	.9	**.3**	4.0
2017–18	NC State	26	24	29.1	.460	.409	.609	3.4	**7.3**	1.7	.2	8.9
2018–19	NC State	**33**	**30**	25.3	**.488**	**.422**	**.747**	2.6	4.2	1.1	.2	12.6
2019–20	NC State	31	**30**	**34.1**	.405	.267	.606	**4.4**	6.8	**1.9**	**.3**	**12.8**
Career		120	87	27.2	.437	.344	.646	3.0	5.1	1.4	.3	9.7

== See also ==
- List of All-Atlantic Coast Conference men's basketball teams
