= 2019–20 ASUN Conference men's basketball season =

- League: NCAA Division I
- Sport: Basketball
- Teams: 8

Regular season
- Champions: Liberty & North Florida
- Season MVP: Caleb Homesley, Liberty

Tournament
- Champions: Liberty
- Runners-up: Lipscomb
- Finals MVP: Caleb Homesley, Liberty

Atlantic Sun men's basketball seasons
- 2018–19 2020–21

2019–20 ASUN men's basketball standings
	Conf.				Overall
Team	W		L	PCT	W		L	PCT
Liberty†	13	–	3	.813	30	–	4	.882
North Florida	13	–	3	.813	21	–	12	.636
Lipscomb	9	–	7	.563	16	–	16	.500
Stetson	9	–	7	.563	16	–	17	.485
North Alabama*	8	–	8	.500	13	–	17	.433
Florida Gulf Coast	7	–	9	.438	10	–	22	.313
Jacksonville	7	–	9	.438	14	–	18	.438
NJIT	6	–	10	.375	9	–	21	.300
Kennesaw State	0	–	16	.000	1	–	28	.034
† 2020 ASUN tournament winner * Ineligible for the 2020 NCAA tournament due to transition period

The 2019–20 ASUN Conference men's basketball season began with practices in October 2019, followed by the start of the 2019–20 NCAA Division I men's basketball season in November. Conference play begins in January 2020 and concluded in March 2020. It was the 42nd season of ASUN Conference basketball.

== Preseason ==
On October 11, 2019, the conference announced its preseason honors and polls.

=== Preseason men's basketball coaches poll ===
(First place votes in parentheses)

1. Liberty (7) 79
2. North Florida (2) 74
3. FGCU 60
4. NJIT 51
5. Lipscomb 40
6. North Alabama 35
7. Jacksonville 32
8. Kennesaw State 20
9. Stetson 14

=== Preseason men's basketball media poll ===
(First place votes in parentheses)

1. Liberty (44) 429
2. North Florida (2) 340
3. FGCU 314
4. Lipscomb (2) 298
5. NJIT 240
6. North Alabama 189
7. Jacksonville 161
8. Kennesaw State 99
9. Stetson 90

=== Honors ===
- Preseason Player of the Year: Caleb Homesley, Liberty
- Preseason Defensive Player of the Year: Wajid Aminu, North Florida
- Fan-Voted Preseason Player of the Year: Christiaan Jones, Stetson
- Fan-Voted Preseason Defensive Player of the Year: Jahlil Rawley, Stetson

== Conference matrix ==
	Florida Gulf Coast	Jacksonville	Kennesaw State	Liberty	Lipscomb	NJIT	North Alabama	North Florida	Stetson
vs. Florida Gulf Coast	—	0−2	0−2	2−0	1−1	1−1	2−0	2−0	1−1
vs. Jacksonville	2−0	—	0−2	2−0	1−1	0−2	1−1	2−0	1−1
vs. Kennesaw State	2−0	2−0	—	2−0	2−0	2−0	2−0	2−0	2−0
vs. Liberty	0−2	0−2	0−2	—	1−1	0−2	0−2	1−1	1−1
vs. Lipscomb	1−1	1−1	0−2	1−1	—	1−1	1−1	1−1	1−1
vs. NJIT	1−1	2−0	0−2	2−0	1−1	—	2−0	1−1	1−1
vs. North Alabama	0−2	1−1	0−2	2−0	1−1	0−2	—	2−0	2−0
vs. North Florida	0−2	0−2	0−2	1−1	1−1	1−1	0−2	—	0−2
vs. Stetson	1−1	1−1	0−2	1−1	1−1	1−1	0−2	2−0	—
Total	7−9	7−9	0−16	13−3	9−7	6−10	8−8	13−3	9−7

== All-Atlantic Sun awards ==
=== Atlantic Sun men's basketball weekly awards ===
Week	Player(s) of the Week	School	Newcomer of the Week	School
Nov 11	Ahsan Asadullah	Lipscomb	Rob Perry	Stetson
Nov 18	Zach Cooks & Carter Hendricksen	NJIT & North Florida	C.J. Brim	North Alabama
Nov 25	Scottie James	Liberty	Kyle Rode	Liberty
Dec 2	David Bell	Jacksonville	KJ Johnson	Lipscomb
Dec 9	Carter Hendricksen	North Florida	Destin Barnes	Jacksonville
Dec 16	Tyler Hooker & Myo-Baxter Bell	Kennesaw State & Liberty	Diante Wood	Jacksonville
Dec 23	Scottie James	Liberty	Mahamadou Diawara	Stetson
Dec 30	Souleymane Diakite	NJIT	KJ Johnson	Lipscomb
Jan 6	Caleb Homesley	Liberty	Sam Gagliardi	Florida Gulf Coast
Jan 13	San Antonio Brinson	NJIT	Mervin James	North Alabama
Jan 21	Garrett Sams	North Florida	Rob Perry	Stetson
Jan 27	Ahsan Asadullah	Lipscomb	Rob Perry	Stetson
Feb 3	Garrett Sams	North Florida	Jalen Warren	Florida Gulf Coast
Feb 10	Caleb Homesley	Liberty	Rob Perry	Stetson
Feb 17	Ahsan Asadullah	Lipscomb	Joel Kabimba	Stetson
Feb 24	Caleb Homesley	Liberty	Dakota Rivers	Florida Gulf Coast
Mar 1	Wajid Aminu	North Florida	Mo Arnold	Jacksonville

== Conference awards ==
On March 3, 2020, the ASUN announced its conference awards.

Award	Recipients
Coach of the Year	Matthew Driscoll, North Florida & Ritchie McKay, Liberty
Player of the Year	Caleb Homesley, Liberty
Defensive Player of the Year	David Bell, Jacksonville
Newcomer of the Year	Destin Barnes, Jacksonville
Freshman of the Year	Rob Perry, Stetson
First Team	Caleb Homesley, Liberty Scottie James, Liberty; Ahsan Asadullah, Lipscomb; Ivan Gandia-Rosa, North Florida; Garrett Sams, North Florida
Second Team	David Bell, Jacksonville Georgie Pacheco-Ortiz, Liberty; Zach Cooks, NJIT; Carter Hendricksen, North Florida; Rob Perry, Stetson
All-Freshman Team	Rob Perry, Stetson Mahamadou Diawara, Stetson; KJ Johnson, Lipscomb; Mervin James, North Alabama; Mo Arnold, Jacksonville
