= 2019–20 Florida Gulf Coast Eagles men's basketball team =

American college basketball season

2019–20 Florida Gulf Coast Eagles men's basketball
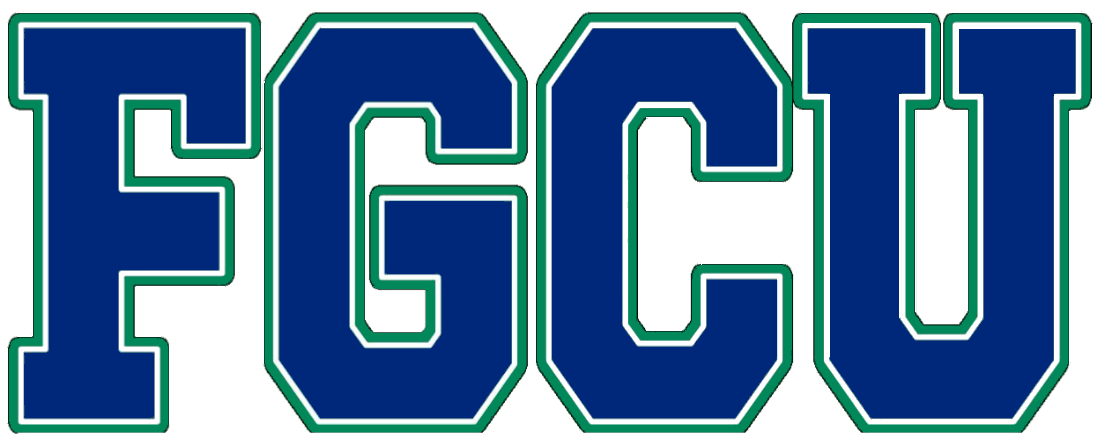
- Conference: Atlantic Sun Conference
- Record: 10–22 (7–9 ASUN)
- Head coach: Michael Fly (2nd season)
- Assistant coaches: Donnie Marsh (2nd season); Justin Furr (2nd season); Joey Cantens (2nd season)
- Home arena: Alico Arena

2019–20 ASUN men's basketball standings
| | Conf. | | | | Overall |
| Team | W | | L | PCT | W | | L | PCT |
|---|---|---|---|---|---|---|---|---|
| Liberty† | 13 | – | 3 | .813 | 30 | – | 4 | .882 |
| North Florida | 13 | – | 3 | .813 | 21 | – | 12 | .636 |
| Lipscomb | 9 | – | 7 | .563 | 16 | – | 16 | .500 |
| Stetson | 9 | – | 7 | .563 | 16 | – | 17 | .485 |
| North Alabama* | 8 | – | 8 | .500 | 13 | – | 17 | .433 |
| Florida Gulf Coast | 7 | – | 9 | .438 | 10 | – | 22 | .313 |
| Jacksonville | 7 | – | 9 | .438 | 14 | – | 18 | .438 |
| NJIT | 6 | – | 10 | .375 | 9 | – | 21 | .300 |
| Kennesaw State | 0 | – | 16 | .000 | 1 | – | 28 | .034 |
† 2020 ASUN tournament winner * Ineligible for the 2020 NCAA tournament due to transition period

The 2019–20 Florida Gulf Coast Eagles men's basketball team represented Florida Gulf Coast University in the 2019–20 NCAA Division I men's basketball season. The Eagles were led by second-year head coach Michael Fly and played their home games at Alico Arena in Fort Myers, Florida as members of the Atlantic Sun Conference. They finished the season 10–22, 7–9 in ASUN Play to finish in a tie for sixth place. They lost in the quarterfinals of the ASUN tournament to Lipscomb.

== Previous season ==
The Eagles finished the 2018–19 season 14–18, 9–7 in ASUN play to finish in a tie for third place. In the ASUN tournament, they were defeated by NJIT in the quarterfinals.

== Roster ==
2019–20 Florida Gulf Coast Eagles men's basketball team
Players
Coaches

| Pos. | # | Name | Height | Weight | Year | Previous school | Hometown |
|---|---|---|---|---|---|---|---|
| F | 0 | Dakota Rivers | 6 ft 8 in (2.03 m) | 195 lb (88 kg) | Fr | Windermere HS | Windermere, FL |
| G | 1 | Zach Scott | 6 ft 4 in (1.93 m) | 173 lb (78 kg) | So | Westminster Academy | Miami, FL |
| G | 2 | Caleb Catto | 6 ft 5 in (1.96 m) | 190 lb (86 kg) | So | Southwest Florida Christian Academy | Cape Coral, FL |
| G | 3 | Christian Carlyle (injured) | 6 ft 6 in (1.98 m) | 210 lb (95 kg) | Sr | Bishop Kenny HS | Jacksonville, FL |
| G | 4 | Cyrus Largie | 6 ft 1 in (1.85 m) | 212 lb (96 kg) | Fr | Mater Lakes Academy | Miramar, FL |
| G | 5 | Jalen Warren | 6 ft 3 in (1.91 m) | 167 lb (76 kg) | Jr | Eastern Florida State | Milton, Ontario |
| G | 10 | Kyle Hoffman (W) | 5 ft 9 in (1.75 m) | 135 lb (61 kg) | RS Jr | Ottawa University | Lawrence, KS |
| F | 11 | Qwanzi Samuels | 6 ft 8 in (2.03 m) | 196 lb (89 kg) | Fr | Loomis Chaffee School | District Heights, MD |
| G | 12 | Malik Hardy | 6 ft 2 in (1.88 m) | 203 lb (92 kg) | RS So | Nova Southeastern | Miramar, FL |
| F | 13 | Tracy Hector Jr. | 6 ft 5 in (1.96 m) | 232 lb (105 kg) | Sr | Kennesaw State | Riverdale, GA |
| G | 15 | Sam Gagliardi | 6 ft 4 in (1.93 m) | 199 lb (90 kg) | Jr | California Baptist | Gig Harbor, WA |
| G | 20 | Jalen Harper | 6 ft 2 in (1.88 m) | 170 lb (77 kg) | Fr | Pebblebrook HS | Mableton, GA |
| G | 23 | Chance Jackson | 6 ft 6 in (1.98 m) | 204 lb (93 kg) | Fr | Plant HS | Tampa, FL |
| F | 30 | Brian Thomas | 6 ft 9 in (2.06 m) | 255 lb (116 kg) | Jr | Kell HS | Kennesaw, GA |
| C | 32 | Justus Rainwater | 6 ft 9 in (2.06 m) | 230 lb (104 kg) | Jr | Cochise College | Enumclaw, WA |
| G | 51 | Lenny Ricca | 6 ft 1 in (1.85 m) | 176 lb (80 kg) | Fr | St. Thomas Aquinas HS | Weston, FL |
| C | 55 | Ryan Rocuant (W) | 6 ft 10 in (2.08 m) | 230 lb (104 kg) | RS So | Estero HS | Estero, FL |

Head coach

- Michael Fly (Kentucky)

Assistant coach(es)

- Donnie Marsh (Franklin & Marshall)
- Justin Furr (Wingate)
- Joey Cantens (Eckerd)

Legend

- (C) Team captain
- (S) Suspended
- (I) Ineligible
- (W) Walk-on
- Injured
- Current redshirt

Roster
Last update: January 23, 2020

== Schedule and results ==
| Date time, TV | Rank^{#} | Opponent^{#} | Result | Record | High points | High rebounds | High assists | Site (attendance) city, state |
Non-conference regular season
| November 5, 2019*; 7:00 pm | | at Saint Louis | W 89–67 | 0–1 | 23 – Scott | 6 – Rainwater | 5 – Warren | Chaifetz Arena (6,321); St. Louis, MO |
| November 9, 2019*; 3:00 pm | | UMBC | L 61–65 | 0–2 | 15 – Catto | 8 – Rivers | 4 – Warren | Alico Arena (3,054); Fort Myers, FL |
| November 11, 2019*; 7:00 pm | | at Dartmouth | L 49–55 | 0–3 | 15 – Scott | 9 – Rainwater | 3 – Catto | Leede Arena (915); Hanover, NH |
| November 15, 2019*; 7:30 pm | | at Mercer | L 68–84 | 0–4 | 16 – Scott | 6 – Tied | 4 – Harper | Hawkins Arena (2,613); Macon, GA |
| November 20, 2019*; 7:00 pm | | Florida Atlantic | W 72–70 | 1–4 | 21 – Warren | 10 – Rainwater | 5 – Warren | Alico Arena (3,076); Fort Myers, FL |
| November 23, 2019*; 7:00 pm | | at No. 21 VCU | L 48–78 | 1–5 | 14 – Catto | 9 – Catto | 5 – Warren | Siegel Center (7,637); Richmond, VA |
| November 26, 2019*; 7:00 pm | | Florida Tech; Hilton Garden Inn FGCU Classic | W 73–59 | 2–5 | 18 – Gagliardi | 12 – Rainwater | 7 – Warren | Alico Arena (2,360); Fort Myers, FL |
| November 29, 2019*; 7:00 pm | | North Dakota; FGCU Classic | L 63–78 | 2–6 | 17 – Scott | 4 – Scott | 3 – Catto | Alico Arena (2,244); Fort Myers, FL |
| November 30, 2019*; 7:00 pm | | Campbell; FGCU Classic | L 46–51 | 2–7 | 13 – Hardy | 12 – Hardy | 3 – Catto | Alico Arena (2,119); Fort Myers, FL |
| December 1, 2019*; 5:00 pm | | Georgia Southern; FGCU Classic | L 57–72 | 2–8 | 13 – Gagliardi | 10 – Rainwater | 4 – Catto | Alico Arena (2,031); Fort Myers, FL |
| December 4, 2019*; 7:00 pm | | at FIU | W 71–53 | 6–3 | 13 – Scott | 9 – Rainwater | 2 – Tied | Ocean Bank Convocation Center (1,408); Miami, FL |
| December 7, 2019*; 7:00 pm | | Robert Morris | L 59–64 | 2–10 | 14 – Scott | 6 – Tied | 5 – Catto | Alico Arena (2,341); Fort Myers, FL |
| December 18, 2019*; 7:00 pm | | at South Dakota State | L 56–75 | 2–11 | 13 – Catto | 7 – Rainwater | 3 – Warren | Frost Arena (1,498); Brookings, SD |
| December 21, 2019*; 7:00 pm | | St. Thomas University | W 84–62 | 3–11 | 19 – Scott | 6 – Warren | 7 – Hector Jr. | Alico Arena (2,053); Fort Myers, FL |
| December 29, 2019*; 7:00 pm, P12N | | at USC | L 58–71 | 3–12 | 10 – Gagliardi | 8 – Thomas | 7 – Catto | Galen Center (2,871); Los Angeles, CA |
Atlantic Sun Conference regular season
| January 2, 2020; 7:00 pm, ESPNU | | Liberty | L 46–59 | 3–13 (0–1) | 14 – Gagliardi | 7 – Hector Jr. | 7 – Warren | Alico Arena (3,305); Fort Myers, FL |
| January 4, 2020; 7:00 pm, ESPN+ | | Lipscomb | W 68–61 | 4–13 (1–1) | 14 – Gagliardi | 7 – Tied | 6 – Warren | Alico Arena (2,644); Fort Myers, FL |
| January 9, 2020; 7:00 pm, ESPN+ | | at North Florida | L 74–89 | 4–14 (1–2) | 16 – Catto | 7 – Catto | 6 – Catto | UNF Arena (2,034); Jacksonville, FL |
| January 11, 2020; 4:00 pm, ESPN+ | | at Stetson | W 66–62 | 5–14 (2–2) | 19 – Catto | 7 – Rainwater | 7 – Hector Jr. | Edmunds Center (628); DeLand, FL |
| January 16, 2020; 7:00 pm, ESPN+ | | Kennesaw State | W 73–51 | 6–14 (3–2) | 11 – Catto | 11 – Warren | 5 – Warren | Alico Arena; Fort Myers, FL |
| January 18, 2020; 4:30 pm, ESPN+ | | at North Alabama | L 65–70 | 6–15 (3–3) | 23 – Catto | 6 – Rainwater | 3 – Tied | Flowers Hall (1,012); Florence, AL |
| January 25, 2020; 7:00 pm, ESPN+ | | NJIT | L 54–56 | 6–16 (3–4) | 21 – Catto | 7 – Hector Jr. | 5 – Warren | Alico Arena (2,843); Fort Myers, FL |
| January 30, 2020; 7:00 pm, ESPN+ | | at Jacksonville | W 63–61 | 7–16 (4–4) | 20 – Catto | 8 – Hector Jr. | 3 – Tied | Swisher Gymnasium (903); Jacksonville, FL |
| February 1, 2020; 7:00 pm, ESPN+ | | at Liberty | L 46–61 | 7–17 (4–5) | 20 – Warren | 8 – Scott | 2 – Catto | Vines Center (4,413); Lynchburg, VA |
| February 6, 2020; 7:00 pm, ESPN+ | | Stetson | L 62–65 | 7–18 (4–6) | 16 – Scott | 7 – Scott | 5 – Hector Jr. | Alico Arena (2,657); Fort Myers, FL |
| February 8, 2020; 7:00 pm, ESPN+ | | North Florida | L 60–69 | 7–19 (4–7) | 18 – Warren | 6 – Catto | 5 – Hector Jr. | Alico Arena (3,107); Fort Myers, FL |
| February 13, 2020; 7:00 pm, ESPN+ | | at Kennesaw State | W 70–58 | 8–19 (5–7) | 26 – Catto | 12 – Rainwater | 5 – Warren | KSU Convocation Center (1,059); Kennesaw, GA |
| February 15, 2020; 5:00 pm, ESPN+ | | at Lipscomb | L 54–64 | 8–20 (5–8) | 12 – Scott | 9 – Hector Jr. | 4 – Catto | Allen Arena (3,821); Nashville, TN |
| February 22, 2020; 4:00 pm, ESPN+ | | at NJIT | W 55–39 | 9–20 (6–8) | 13 – Catto | 13 – Rivers | 6 – Warren | Wellness and Events Center (735); Newark, NJ |
| February 27, 2020; 7:00 pm, ESPN+ | | Jacksonville | W 73–67 | 10–20 (7–8) | 15 – Catto | 5 – Warren | 7 – Warren | Alico Arena (2,758); Fort Myers, FL |
| February 29, 2020; 1:00 pm, ESPN+ | | North Alabama | L 73–78 ^{OT} | 10–21 (7–9) | 19 – Warren | 5 – Hardy | 5 – Warren | Alico Arena (2,812); Fort Myers, FL |
Atlantic Sun tournament
| March 3, 2020; 8:00 pm, ESPN+ | (6) | at (3) Lipscomb; Quarterfinals | L 63–68 | 10–22 | 20 – Catto | 7 – Largie | 3 – 3 tied | Allen Arena (2,191); Nashville, TN |
*Non-conference game. ^{#}Rankings from AP Poll. (#) Tournament seedings in parentheses. All times are in Eastern Time.
