= 2019–20 Liberty Flames basketball team =

American college basketball season

2019–20 Liberty Flames basketball

The Islands of the Bahamas Showcase champions D.C. Holiday Hoops Classic champions Atlantic Sun regular season co-champions Atlantic Sun tournament champions
- Conference: ASUN Conference
- Record: 30–4 (13–3 ASUN Conference)
- Head coach: Ritchie McKay (5th (7th overall) season)
- Assistant coaches: Brad Soucie (5th (7th) season); Derek Johnston (2nd season); Kevin Anderson (2nd season)
- Home arena: Vines Center

2019–20 ASUN men's basketball standings
	Conf.				Overall
Team	W		L	PCT	W		L	PCT
Liberty†	13	–	3	.813	30	–	4	.882
North Florida	13	–	3	.813	21	–	12	.636
Lipscomb	9	–	7	.563	16	–	16	.500
Stetson	9	–	7	.563	16	–	17	.485
North Alabama*	8	–	8	.500	13	–	17	.433
Florida Gulf Coast	7	–	9	.438	10	–	22	.313
Jacksonville	7	–	9	.438	14	–	18	.438
NJIT	6	–	10	.375	9	–	21	.300
Kennesaw State	0	–	16	.000	1	–	28	.034
† 2020 ASUN tournament winner * Ineligible for the 2020 NCAA tournament due to transition period

The 2019–20 Liberty Flames men's basketball team represented Liberty University in the 2019–20 NCAA Division I men's basketball season. The team played its home games in Lynchburg, Virginia for the 30th consecutive and final season at Vines Center, with a capacity of 8,085. The team was led by Ritchie McKay, who is in his seventh season, but fifth season since his return to the program. They are second-year members of the ASUN Conference.

== Previous season ==
The Flames finished the 2018–19 season 29–7, 14–2 in ASUN play to finish in second place in their second season in the ASUN. They defeated Jacksonville, North Florida, and Lipscomb in the championship game to win the ASUN tournament. As a result, the Flames received the conference's automatic bid to the NCAA tournament as the No. 12 seed in the East bracket, the school's fourth NCAA Tournament bid. They defeated No. 5-seed Mississippi State in the first round before losing to No. 4-seed Virginia Tech in the second round. This marked Liberty's highest seeding in the NCAA tournament and its first March Madness victory in school history.

== Departures ==
Name	Number	Pos.	Height	Weight	Year	Hometown	Notes
Lovell Cabbil	3	Guard	6'3"	175	Senior	Arlington, Texas	Graduated
Keenan Gumbs	5	Forward	6'5"	210	Senior	Conroe, Texas	Graduated
Zach Farquhar	15	Guard	5'9"	160	Senior	Cincinnati	Graduated
Keegan McDowell	20	Guard/forward	6'6"	180	Sophomore	Cincinnati	Transferred

== 2019-20 Newcomers ==
College recruiting information
Name	Hometown	School	Height	Weight	Commit date
Marten Maide; G	Charlotte, North Carolina	Carmel Christian School	6 ft 5 in (1.96 m)	N/A	Jan 2, 2018
Marten Maide; G	Recruit ratings: No ratings found				
Colton Reed; G	Wake Forest, North Carolina	Roanoke College	6 ft 3 in (1.91 m)	N/A	
Colton Reed; G	Recruit ratings: No ratings found				
Shiloh Robinson; F	Kearney, Nebraska	Kearney High School	6 ft 7 in (2.01 m)	N/A	Sep 24, 2018
Shiloh Robinson; F	Recruit ratings: No ratings found				
Kyle Rode; F	Lexington, Kentucky	Lexington Christian Academy	6 ft 7 in (2.01 m)	N/A	Jun 26, 2018
Kyle Rode; F	Recruit ratings: Scout: Rivals: 247Sports:				
Overall recruit ranking:
Note: In many cases, Scout, Rivals, 247Sports, On3, and ESPN may conflict in their listings of height and weight.; In these cases, the average was taken. ESPN grades are on a 100-point scale.; Sources: "2019 Team Ranking". Rivals.

== Roster ==
2019–20 Liberty Flames men's basketball team
Players
Coaches

Pos.	#	Name	Height	Weight	Year	Previous school	Hometown
F	0	Myo Baxter-Bell	6 ft 5 in (1.96 m)	255 lb (116 kg)	RS Sr	Chaminade Julieen High School	Cincinnati, Ohio
G	1	Caleb Homesley	6 ft 6 in (1.98 m)	205 lb (93 kg)	RS Sr	Porter Ridge High School	Indian Trail, North Carolina
G	2	Darius McGhee	5 ft 9 in (1.75 m)	—	So	Blue Ridge School	Roxboro, North Carolina
G	4	Tytist Dean (W)	6 ft 0 in (1.83 m)	180 lb (82 kg)	RS Fr	North High School	St. Paul, Minnesota
G	5	Marten Maide	6 ft 5 in (1.96 m)	—	Fr	Carmel Christian School	Charlotte, North Carolina
G/F	10	Elijah Cuffee	6 ft 4 in (1.93 m)	185 lb (84 kg)	Jr	Liberty Christian Academy	Poca, West Virginia
G	11	Georgie Pacheco-Ortiz	6 ft 1 in (1.85 m)	170 lb (77 kg)	Sr	Deep Run High School	Ponce, Puerto Rico
G	13	Luke McKay (W)	—	—	Fr	Liberty Christian Academy	Lynchburg, Virginia
G	15	Colton Reed (W)	6 ft 3 in (1.91 m)	—	RS So	Roanoke Maroons	Wake Forest, North Carolina
F	22	Kyle Rode	6 ft 7 in (2.01 m)	—	Fr	Lexington Christian Academy	Lexington, Kentucky
G	25	Josh Price	6 ft 3 in (1.91 m)	—	RS Fr	Carmel Christian School	Charlotte, North Carolina
F	31	Scottie James	6 ft 8 in (2.03 m)	235 lb (107 kg)	RS Sr	Bradley	Tarpon Springs, Florida
F	32	Blake Preston	6 ft 9 in (2.06 m)	—	RS Fr	Charlotte Christian School	Charlotte, North Carolina
F	33	Shiloh Robinson	6 ft 7 in (2.01 m)	—	Fr	Kearney High School	Kearney, Nebraska
C	55	Brendan Newton	7 ft 2 in (2.18 m)	235 lb (107 kg)	RS So	Faith Christian High	Roanoke, Virginia

Head coach

- Ritchie McKay (Seattle Pacific)

Assistant coach(es)

- Brad Soucie (Christian Heritage)
- Derek Johnston (Alabama-Huntsville)
- Kevin Anderson (Richmond)

Legend

- (C) Team captain
- (S) Suspended
- (I) Ineligible
- (W) Walk-on
- Injured
- Current redshirt

- Roster is subject to change as/if players transfer or leave the program for other reasons.

== Schedule and results ==
Date time, TV	Rank^{#}	Opponent^{#}	Result	Record	High points	High rebounds	High assists	Site (attendance) city, state
Non-conference regular season
Nov 8, 2019*; 7:00 pm, ESPN+		Radford	W 66–60	1–0	18 – Homesley	6 – Tied	2 – 6 tied	Vines Center (7,872); Lynchburg, VA
Nov 10, 2019*; 2:00 pm, ESPN+		UMES	W 66–55	2–0	22 – James	16 – James	6 – Homesley	Vines Center (3,090); Lynchburg, VA
Nov 12, 2019*; 7:00 pm, ESPN+		South Carolina State	W 65–39	3–0	12 – Pacheco-Ortiz	12 – James	4 – Tied	Vines Center (3,084); Lynchburg, VA
Nov 16, 2019*; 4:00 pm, ESPN3		at East Carolina; The Islands of the Bahamas Showcase	W 77–57	4–0	25 – Homesley	9 – Tied	4 – Tied	Williams Arena (4,527); Greenville, NC
Nov 19, 2019*; 7:00 pm, ESPN+		Navy	W 55–48	5–0	13 – McGhee	9 – James	3 – James	Vines Center (4,010); Lynchburg, VA
Nov 22, 2019*; 11:00 am, FloHoops		vs. Morgan State; The Islands of the Bahamas Showcase quarterfinal	W 89–48	6–0	17 – Rode	5 – Rode	4 – Baxter-Bell	Kendal Isaacs National Gymnasium (300); Nassau, Bahamas
Nov 23, 2019*; 5:00 pm, FloHoops		vs. Rice; The Islands of the Bahamas Showcase semifinal	W 71–59	7–0	14 – Rode	12 – James	4 – Pacheco-Ortiz	Kendal Isaacs National Gymnasium (300); Nassau, Bahamas
Nov 24, 2019*; 8:00 pm, FloHoops		vs. Kansas City; The Islands of the Bahamas Showcase Final	W 62–49	8–0	14 – Pacheco-Ortiz	6 – Tied	3 – Cuffee	Kendal Isaacs National Gymnasium (300); Nassau, Bahamas
Nov 29, 2019*; 2:00 pm		Kentucky Christian	W 88–42	9–0	15 – James	7 – James	4 – McGhee	Vines Center (2,717); Lynchburg, VA
Dec 2, 2019*; 10:00 pm		Trinity Baptist	W 87–28	10–0	15 – Cuffee	9 – Preston	5 – Tied	Vines Center (3,164); Lynchburg, VA
Dec 8, 2019*; 6:30 pm, ESPNU		at Grand Canyon; Jerry Colangelo Classic	W 70–61	11–0	17 – Homesley	5 – 4 tied	4 – Tied	Talking Stick Resort Arena (5,406); Phoenix, AZ
Dec 14, 2019*; 8:00 pm, SECN+		at Vanderbilt	W 61–56	12–0	18 – Baxter-Bell	11 – James	5 – Pacheco-Ortiz	Memorial Gymnasium (9,045); Nashville, TN
Dec 20, 2019*; 5:00 pm, FloHoops		vs. Towson; DC Holiday Hoops	W 66–54	13–0	16 – Pacheco-Ortiz	6 – James	4 – Cuffee	Entertainment and Sports Arena (707); Washington, D.C.
Dec 21, 2019*; 3:30 pm, FloHoops		vs. Akron; DC Holiday Hoops	W 80–67	14–0	16 – Homesley	6 – Tied	6 – Baxter-Bell	Entertainment and Sports Arena (942); Washington, D.C.
Dec 29, 2019*; 1:30 pm, SECN+		at LSU	L 57–74	14–1	12 – Tied	4 – Cuffee	6 – Homesley	Pete Maravich Assembly Center (9,193); Baton Rouge, LA
Atlantic Sun Conference regular season
Jan 2, 2020; 5:00 pm, ESPNU		at FGCU	W 59–46	15–1 (1–0)	24 – Homesley	6 – Homesley	4 – Baxter-Bell	Alico Arena (3,305); Fort Myers, FL
Jan 4, 2020; 4:00 pm, ESPN+		at NJIT	W 65–38	16–1 (2–0)	20 – Homesley	10 – James	4 – Pacheco-Ortiz	Wellness and Events Center (1,004); Newark, NJ
Jan 9, 2020; 7:00 pm, ESPN+		North Alabama	W 63–52	17–1 (3–0)	16 – Baxter-Bell	7 – James	3 – 3 tied	Vines Center (2,592); Lynchburg, VA
Jan 11, 2020; 5:00 pm, ESPN+		Jacksonville	W 54–37	18–1 (4–0)	14 – McGhee	9 – James	2 – 4 tied	Vines Center (4,299); Lynchburg, VA
Jan 18, 2020; 7:00 pm, ESPN+		Lipscomb	W 67–60	19–1 (5–0)	21 – Pacheco-Ortiz	11 – James	4 – Homesley	Vines Center (6,008); Lynchburg, VA
Jan 23, 2020; 7:00 pm, ESPN+		at North Florida	L 70–71	19–2 (5–1)	19 – McGhee	6 – Homesley	2 – 3 Tied	UNF Arena (2,371); Jacksonville, FL
Jan 25, 2020; 4:00 pm, ESPN+		at Stetson	L 43–48	19–3 (5–2)	12 – Tied	10 – James	7 – Cuffee	Edmunds Center (862); Deland, FL
Jan 30, 2020; 7:00 pm, ESPN+		Kennesaw State	W 83–45	20–3 (6–2)	16 – James	12 – James	4 – Pacheco-Ortiz	Vines Center (3,988); Lynchburg, VA
Feb 1, 2020; 7:00 pm, ESPN+		FGCU	W 61–46	21–3 (7–2)	16 – Pacheco-Ortiz	8 – Homesley	3 – Homesley	Vines Center (4,413); Lynchburg, VA
Feb 6, 2020; 7:00 pm, ESPN+		at Jacksonville	W 71–62	22–3 (8–2)	25 – Homesley	8 – McGhee	4 – Pacheco-Ortiz	Swisher Gymnasium (816); Jacksonville, FL
Feb 8, 2020; 4:30 pm, ESPN+		at North Alabama	W 74–56	23–3 (9–2)	30 – Homesley	9 – Homesley	3 – Homesley	Flowers Hall (957); Florence, AL
Feb 15, 2020; 7:00 pm, ESPN+		NJIT	W 62–49	24–3 (10–2)	14 – 3 tied	8 – Cuffee	3 – Tied	Vines Center (4,745); Lynchburg, VA
Feb 20, 2020; 7:00 pm, ESPN+		North Florida	W 82–77	25–3 (11–2)	28 – Homesley	10 – James	4 – McGhee	Vines Center (5,613); Lynchburg, VA
Feb 22, 2020; 5:00 pm, ESPN+		Stetson	W 77–49	26–3 (12–2)	22 – Homesley	7 – Homesley	5 – McGhee	Vines Center (6,762); Lynchburg, VA
Feb 27, 2020; 7:00 pm, ESPN+		at Kennesaw State	W 76–52	27–3 (13–2)	26 – Homesley	8 – James	4 – James	KSU Convocation Center (933); Kennesaw, GA
Feb 29, 2020; 5:00 pm, ESPN+		at Lipscomb	L 71–77	27–4 (13–3)	17 – McGhee	10 – James	6 – Homesley	Allen Arena (3,625); Nashville, TN
Atlantic Sun Conference tournament
March 3, 2020; 7:00 pm, ESPN+	(1)	(8) NJIT; Quarterfinals	W 55–49	28–4	14 – Homesley	10 – James	4 – Cuffee	Vines Center (3,042); Lynchburg, VA
March 5, 2020; 7:00 pm, ESPN+	(1)	(4) Stetson; Semifinals	W 66–62	29–4	26 – Homesley	8 – Homesley	3 – Tied	Vines Center (6,762); Lynchburg, VA
March 8, 2020; 3:00 pm, ESPN	(1)	(3) Lipscomb; Championship	W 73–57	30–4	16 – Tied	9 – Homesley	4 – Baxter-Bell	Vines Center (7,728); Lynchburg, VA
*Non-conference game. ^{#}Rankings from AP Poll. (#) Tournament seedings in parentheses. All times are in Eastern Time..
