= 2019–20 Kennesaw State Owls men's basketball team =

American college basketball season

2019–20 Kennesaw State Owls men's basketball
- Conference: Atlantic Sun Conference
- Record: 1–28 (0–16 ASUN)
- Head coach: Amir Abdur-Rahim (1st season)
- Assistant coaches: Ben Fletcher; Pershin Williams; Tanner Smith
- Home arena: KSU Convocation Center

2019–20 ASUN men's basketball standings
	Conf.				Overall
Team	W		L	PCT	W		L	PCT
Liberty†	13	–	3	.813	30	–	4	.882
North Florida	13	–	3	.813	21	–	12	.636
Lipscomb	9	–	7	.563	16	–	16	.500
Stetson	9	–	7	.563	16	–	17	.485
North Alabama*	8	–	8	.500	13	–	17	.433
Florida Gulf Coast	7	–	9	.438	10	–	22	.313
Jacksonville	7	–	9	.438	14	–	18	.438
NJIT	6	–	10	.375	9	–	21	.300
Kennesaw State	0	–	16	.000	1	–	28	.034
† 2020 ASUN tournament winner * Ineligible for the 2020 NCAA tournament due to transition period

The 2019–20 Kennesaw State Owls men's basketball team represented Kennesaw State University in the 2019–20 NCAA Division I men's basketball season. The Owls, led by first-year head coach Amir Abdur-Rahim, played their home games at the KSU Convocation Center in Kennesaw, Georgia as members of the Atlantic Sun Conference (ASUN). They finished the season 1–28, 0–16 in ASUN play, to finish in last place. They failed to qualify for the ASUN tournament.

== Previous season ==
The Owls finished the 2018–19 season 6–26 overall, 3–13 in ASUN play, to finish in a tie for 8th place, and due to their tiebreaker over Stetson, they qualified for the conference tournament. In the ASUN tournament, they lost in the first round to top-seeded Lipscomb.

On February 21, 2019, head coach Al Skinner announced his resignation from Kennesaw State effective at the end of the season. On April 18, 2019, Amir Abdur-Rahim was announced as Skinner's replacement.

== Roster ==
2019–20 Kennesaw State Owls men's basketball team
Players
Coaches

Pos.	#	Name	Height	Weight	Year	Previous school	Hometown
G	0	Glenn Robinson II	6 ft 5 in (1.96 m)	194 lb (88 kg)	Jr	Coastal Alabama CC	Atlanta, GA
G	1	Terrell Burden	5 ft 10 in (1.78 m)	155 lb (70 kg)	Fr	Campbell HS	Smyrna, GA
G	3	Adili Kuerban	6 ft 2 in (1.88 m)	183 lb (83 kg)	So	Sierra Canyon School	Santa Clarita, CA
G	4	Tyler Hooker	5 ft 10 in (1.78 m)	147 lb (67 kg)	RS Sr	Moravian Prep	Simpsonville, SC
G	10	John Ogwuche	6 ft 2 in (1.88 m)	212 lb (96 kg)	Sr	New Hampshire	Decatur, GA
G	12	Jamie Lewis	6 ft 4 in (1.93 m)	175 lb (79 kg)	RS Fr	Wake Forest	Atlanta, GA
G	13	C.J. Washington	6 ft 4 in (1.93 m)	208 lb (94 kg)	RS Fr	Tompkins HS	Houston, TX
F	15	Ugo Obineke	6 ft 6 in (1.98 m)	191 lb (87 kg)	So	Rowlett HS	Rowlett, TX
F	21	Armani Harris	6 ft 6 in (1.98 m)	199 lb (90 kg)	Fr	Newton HS	Covington, GA
F	23	Antonio Spencer	6 ft 9 in (2.06 m)	233 lb (106 kg)	RS So	Duncanville HS	Dallas, TX
F	24	Bryson Lockley	6 ft 8 in (2.03 m)	208 lb (94 kg)	RS Sr	Panola College	Houston, TX
F	41	Drew Romich	6 ft 9 in (2.06 m)	235 lb (107 kg)	RS Sr	Longwood	Marietta, GA
F	45	Pietro Agostini	6 ft 9 in (2.06 m)	224 lb (102 kg)	So	Hillcrest Prep	Trieste, Italy

Head coach

- Amir Abdur-Rahim (Southeastern Louisiana)

Assistant coach(es)

- Ben Fletcher (Troy)
- Pershin Williams (North Florida)
- Tanner Smith (Clemson)

Legend

- (C) Team captain
- (S) Suspended
- (I) Ineligible
- (W) Walk-on
- Injured
- Current redshirt

Roster
Last update: July 8, 2024

== Schedule and results ==
Date time, TV	Opponent	Result	Record	Site (attendance) city, state
Non-conference regular season
November 5, 2019*; 9:00 p.m.	at Creighton	L 55–81	0–1	CHI Health Center Omaha (16,321); Omaha, NE
November 7, 2019*; 8:00 p.m.	at Drake	L 55–86	0–2	Knapp Center (2,780); Des Moines, IA
November 11, 2019*; 7:00 p.m.	at Mercer	L 62–74	0–3	Hawkins Arena (2,373); Macon, GA
November 18, 2019*; 7:00 p.m.	Reinhardt; Exhibition	W 69–54		KSU Convocation Center (1,556); Kennesaw, GA
November 22, 2019*; 8:30 p.m.	vs. Monmouth; ASUN/MAAC Challenge	L 40–71	0–4	HP Field House (153); Lake Buena Vista, FL
November 23, 2019*; 6:00 p.m.	vs. Iona; ASUN/MAAC Challenge	L 52–75	0–5	HP Field House (113); Lake Buena Vista, FL
December 2, 2019*; 7:00 p.m.	at Elon	L 47–70	0–6	Schar Center (1,402); Elon, NC
December 4, 2019*; 7:00 p.m.	at UNC Greensboro	L 54–72	0–7	Fleming Gymnasium (2,038); Greensboro, NC
December 7, 2019*; 1:00 p.m.	FIU	L 81–84	0–8	KSU Convocation Center (1,202); Kennesaw, GA
December 13, 2019*; 7:00 p.m.	Gardner–Webb	W 85–61	1–8	KSU Convocation Center (953); Kennesaw, GA
December 16, 2019*; 8:00 p.m.	at Murray State	L 38–74	1–9	CFSB Center (3,016); Murray, KY
December 18, 2019*; 7:30 p.m., ESPN+	at Belmont	L 44–83	1–10	Curb Event Center (1,283); Nashville, TN
December 22, 2019*; 2:00 p.m.	Wofford	L 70–83	1–11	KSU Convocation Center (801); Kennesaw, GA
December 29, 2019*; 7:00 p.m.	at No. 25 Iowa	L 51–93	1–12	Carver–Hawkeye Arena (15,056); Iowa City, IA
Atlantic Sun Conference regular season
January 2, 2020; 7:00 p.m., ESPN+	North Florida	L 57–76	1–13 (0–1)	KSU Convocation Center (816); Kennesaw, GA
January 4, 2020; 4:30 p.m., ESPN+	Stetson	L 54–57	1–14 (0–2)	KSU Convocation Center (1,086); Kennesaw, GA
January 9, 2020; 7:30 p.m., ESPN+	at Lipscomb	L 73–85	1–15 (0–3)	Allen Arena (1,435); Nashville, TN
January 16, 2020; 7:00 p.m., ESPN+	at Florida Gulf Coast	L 51–73	1–16 (0–4)	Alico Arena; Fort Myers, FL
January 18, 2020; 4:00 p.m., ESPN+	at NJIT	L 48–66	1–17 (0–5)	Wellness and Events Center (767); Newark, NJ
January 23, 2020; 7:00 p.m., ESPN+	North Alabama	L 58–78	1–18 (0–6)	KSU Convocation Center (984); Kennesaw, GA
January 25, 2020; 4:30 p.m., ESPN+	Jacksonville	L 64–83	1–19 (0–7)	KSU Convocation Center (1,973); Kennesaw, GA
January 30, 2020; 7:00 p.m., ESPN+	at Liberty	L 45–83	1–20 (0–8)	Vines Center (3,988); Lynchburg, VA
February 1, 2020; 5:00 p.m., ESPN+	at North Florida	L 45–86	1–21 (0–9)	UNF Arena (1,683); Jacksonville, FL
February 8, 2020; 4:30 p.m., ESPN+	Lipscomb	L 66–72	1–22 (0–10)	KSU Convocation Center (1,677); Kennesaw, GA
February 13, 2020; 7:00 p.m., ESPN+	Florida Gulf Coast	L 58–70	1–23 (0–11)	KSU Convocation Center (1,059); Kennesaw, GA
February 15, 2020; 4:00 p.m., ESPN+	at Stetson	L 42–59	1–24 (0–12)	Edmunds Center; DeLand, FL
February 20, 2020; 7:00 p.m., ESPN+	at North Alabama	L 46–65	1−25 (0−13)	Flowers Hall (975); Florence, AL
February 22, 2020; 6:00 p.m., ESPN+	at Jacksonville	L 55–69	1–26 (0–14)	Swisher Gymnasium (734); Jacksonville, FL
February 27, 2020; 7:00 p.m., ESPN+	Liberty	L 52–76	1–27 (0–15)	KSU Convocation Center (933); Kennesaw, GA
February 29, 2020; 4:30 p.m., ESPN+	NJIT	L 55–76	1–28 (0–16)	KSU Convocation Center (1,006); Kennesaw, GA
*Non-conference game. ^{#}Rankings from AP poll. (#) Tournament seedings in parentheses. All times are in Eastern.
