= 2019–20 North Alabama Lions men's basketball team =

American college basketball season

2019–20 North Alabama Lions men's basketball
- Conference: Atlantic Sun Conference
- Record: 13–17 (8–8 ASUN)
- Head coach: Tony Pujol (2nd season)
- Assistant coaches: Ahmad Smith; Willie Watson; Tom Berryman
- Home arena: Flowers Hall

2019–20 ASUN men's basketball standings
	Conf.				Overall
Team	W		L	PCT	W		L	PCT
Liberty†	13	–	3	.813	30	–	4	.882
North Florida	13	–	3	.813	21	–	12	.636
Lipscomb	9	–	7	.563	16	–	16	.500
Stetson	9	–	7	.563	16	–	17	.485
North Alabama*	8	–	8	.500	13	–	17	.433
Florida Gulf Coast	7	–	9	.438	10	–	22	.313
Jacksonville	7	–	9	.438	14	–	18	.438
NJIT	6	–	10	.375	9	–	21	.300
Kennesaw State	0	–	16	.000	1	–	28	.034
† 2020 ASUN tournament winner * Ineligible for the 2020 NCAA tournament due to transition period

The 2019–20 North Alabama Lions men's basketball team represented the University of North Alabama in the 2019–20 NCAA Division I men's basketball season. The Lions, led by second-year head coach Tony Pujol, played their home games at Flowers Hall in Florence, Alabama as members of the Atlantic Sun Conference (ASUN). They finished the season 13–17, 8–8 in ASUN play, to finish in fifth place. They lost in the quarterfinals of the ASUN tournament to Stetson.

This season will mark North Alabama's second of a four-year transition period from Division II to Division I. As a result, the Lions are not eligible for NCAA postseason play but can participate in the ASUN tournament. They could have also played in the CIT or CBI, if invited.

== Previous season ==
The Lions finished the 2018–19 season 10–22 overall, 7–9 in ASUN play, to finish in a tie for sixth place. In the ASUN tournament, they were defeated by North Florida in the quarterfinals.

== Roster ==
2019–20 North Alabama Lions men's basketball team
Players
Coaches

Pos.	#	Name	Height	Weight	Year	Previous school	Hometown
G	0	Holden Redparth	6 ft 5 in (1.96 m)	215 lb (98 kg)	Jr	Morgan County HS	Rockville, MD
G	1	Tavon King	5 ft 11 in (1.8 m)	175 lb (79 kg)	Jr	Columbia State CC	Gates, TN
G	2	Christian Agnew	6 ft 2 in (1.88 m)	190 lb (86 kg)	So	Glenn HS	Detroit, MI
G	3	Jamari Blackmon	6 ft 1 in (1.85 m)	205 lb (93 kg)	So	Hoover HS	Hoover, AL
F	4	Logan Windeler	6 ft 9 in (2.06 m)	195 lb (88 kg)	So	Victory Rock Prep School	Manteno, IL
F	5	Mervin James	6 ft 7 in (2.01 m)	215 lb (98 kg)	Fr	Pebblebrook HS	St. Thomas, USVI
G	11	C.J. Brim	5 ft 9 in (1.75 m)	170 lb (77 kg)	Jr	Pearl River CC	Tupelo, MS
F	13	James II Anderson	6 ft 5 in (1.96 m)	200 lb (91 kg)	Jr	Cuyahoga CC	Roswell, GA
F	14	Payton Youngblood	6 ft 5 in (1.96 m)	200 lb (91 kg)	Jr	Snead State CC	Birmingham, AL
F	15	Cameron Diggs	6 ft 8 in (2.03 m)	220 lb (100 kg)	Sr	East Central CC	Mobile, AL
F	21	Emanuel Littles	6 ft 7 in (2.01 m)	210 lb (95 kg)	So	Lanett HS	Lanett, AL
G	22	Austin Meloche	6 ft 1 in (1.85 m)	180 lb (82 kg)	Fr	Calvary Christian HS	Palm Harbor, FL
G	24	Aleksa Matic	6 ft 5 in (1.96 m)	200 lb (91 kg)	So	Sportksa Gimnazija	Belgrade, Serbia
C	35	Abdul Ahmad	6 ft 9 in (2.06 m)	220 lb (100 kg)	Fr	Torrance HS	Torrance, CA

Head coach

- Tony Pujol (Sterling (KS))

Assistant coach(es)

- Ahmad Smith (Appalachian State)
- Willie Watson (Alabama)
- Tom Barryman (Alabama)

Legend

- (C) Team captain
- (S) Suspended
- (I) Ineligible
- (W) Walk-on
- Injured
- Current redshirt

Roster
Last update: January 23, 2020

== Schedule and results ==
Date time, TV	Rank^{#}	Opponent^{#}	Result	Record	High points	High rebounds	High assists	Site (attendance) city, state
Non-conference regular season
November 6, 2019*; 7:00 p.m.		at South Carolina	L 55–77	0–1	12 – Brim	7 – tied	2 – tied	Colonial Life Arena (11,927); Columbia, SC
November 10, 2019*; 2:00 p.m.		Carver	W 95–64	1–1	14 – tied	11 – Littles	9 – Blackmon	Flowers Hall (476); Florence, AL
November 12, 2019*; 6:00 p.m.		at Indiana	L 65–91	1–2	19 – Blackmon	5 – Littles	2 – tied	Simon Skjodt Assembly Hall (17,222); Bloomington, IN
November 16, 2019*; 11:00 a.m.		Samford	W 61–55	2–2	12 – tied	12 – Littles	7 – Blackmon	Flowers Hall (1,016); Florence, AL
November 19, 2019*; 7:00 p.m.		at South Dakota State	L 73–78	2–3	26 – Blackmon	8 – Littles	4 – Youngblood	Frost Arena (1,616); Brookings, SD
November 22, 2019*; 7:30 p.m.		at Louisiana Tech	L 61–82	2–4	26 – Blackmon	8 – Littles	2 – Agnew	Thomas Assembly Center (1,622); Ruston, LA
November 27, 2019*; 1:30 p.m.		Mississippi Valley State	W 73–50	3–4	20 – James	10 – James	3 – Brim	Flowers Hall (387); Florence, AL
November 30, 2019*; 11:00 a.m.		Morehead State	W 67–57	4–4	17 – Agnew	12 – James	3 – Blackmon	Flowers Hall (312); Florence, AL
December 4, 2019*; 6:00 p.m.		at Troy	L 63-71	4–5	18 – Blackmon	7 – James	3 – Blackmon	Trojan Arena (2,514); Troy, AL
December 8, 2019*; 2:00 p.m., ESPN+		Birmingham–Southern	W 78–50	5–5	19 – Blackmon	8 – Diggs	4 – tied	Flowers Hall (441); Florence, AL
December 17, 2019*; 7:00 p.m.		at UAB	L 56-63	5–6	14 – Agnew	10 – Littles	2 – James	Bartow Arena (2,455); Birmingham, AL
December 20, 2019*; 6:00 p.m.		at Alabama A&M	L 80-92	5–7	22 – Brim	11 – Littles	5 – Brim	Elmore Gymnasium (891); Normal, AL
December 28, 2019*; 1:00 p.m., ACCNX		at No. 17 Florida State	L 71–88	5–8	15 – Blackmon	8 – tied	3 – Brim	Donald L. Tucker Center (5,636); Tallahassee, FL
Atlantic Sun Conference regular season
January 2, 2020; 6:00 p.m., ESPN+		Jacksonville	W 62–57	6–8 (1–0)	15 – Agnew	13 – Littles	2 – tied	Flowers Hall (434); Florence, AL
January 4, 2020; 3:30 p.m., ESPN+		North Florida	L 65–81	6–9 (1–1)	17 – Agnew	8 – Littles	3 – Agnew	Flowers Hall (776); Florence, AL
January 9, 2020; 6:00 p.m., ESPN+		at Liberty	L 52–63	6–10 (1–2)	16 – James	6 – tied	3 – tied	Vines Center (2,592); Lynchburg, VA
January 11, 2020; 4:00 p.m., ESPN+		at Lipscomb	W 82–69	7–10 (2–2)	20 – Agnew	14 – Littles	4 – Brim	Allen Arena (1,174); Nashville, TN
January 16, 2020; 6:00 p.m., ESPN+		Stetson	L 49–54	7–11 (2–3)	24 – Agnew	17 – Littles	6 – Brim	Flowers Hall (847); Florence, AL
January 18, 2020; 3:30 p.m., ESPN+		Florida Gulf Coast	W 70–65	8–11 (3–3)	17 – Agnew	9 – Littles	3 – tied	Flowers Hall (1,012); Florence, AL
January 23, 2020; 6:00 p.m., ESPN+		at Kennesaw State	W 78–58	9–11 (4–3)	19 – Anderson	10 – Littles	8 – Brim	KSU Convocation Center (984); Kennesaw, GA
January 30, 2020; 6:00 p.m., ESPN+		at NJIT	W 78–74	10–11 (5–3)	21 – Blackmon	14 – Littles	3 – 3 tied	Wellness and Events Center (328); Newark, NJ
February 1, 2020; 5:00 p.m., ESPN+		at Jacksonville	L 83–85	10–12 (5–4)	27 – Blackmon	15 – Littles	4 – Brim	Swisher Gymnasium (602); Jacksonville, FL
February 6, 2020; 6:00 p.m., ESPN+		Lipscomb	L 71–73	10–13 (5–5)	20 – Agnew	14 – Littles	4 – Brim	Flowers Hall (978); Florence, AL
February 8, 2020; 3:30 p.m., ESPN+		Liberty	L 56–74	10–14 (5–6)	14 – Agnew	14 – Littles	2 – tied	Flowers Hall (957); Florence, AL
February 13, 2020; 6:00 p.m., ESPN+		at Stetson	L 64–75	10–15 (5–7)	16 – Agnew	7 – Littles	5 – Blackmon	Edmunds Center (945); DeLand, FL
February 15, 2020; 4:00 p.m., ESPN+		at North Florida	L 67–80	10–16 (5–8)	23 – James	12 – Littles	6 – Blackmon	UNF Arena (1,548); Jacksonville, FL
February 20, 2020; 6:00 p.m., ESPN+		Kennesaw State	W 65–46	11–16 (6–8)	16 – James	12 – tied	3 – Blackmon	Flowers Hall (975); Florence, AL
February 27, 2020; 6:00 p.m., ESPN+		NJIT	W 72–65	12–16 (7–8)	18 – Littles	13 – Littles	3 – Blackmon	Flowers Hall (812); Florence, AL
February 29, 2020; 12:00 p.m., ESPN+		at Florida Gulf Coast	W 78–73 ^{OT}	13–16 (8–8)	22 – Blackmon	9 – Littles	4 – Blackmon	Alico Arena (2,812); Fort Myers, FL
Atlantic Sun tournament
March 3, 2020; 6:00 p.m., ESPN+	(5)	at (4) Stetson; Quarterfinals	L 72–82	13–17	22 – Blackmon	9 – James	6 – Brim	Edmunds Center (681); DeLand, FL
*Non-conference game. ^{#}Rankings from AP poll. (#) Tournament seedings in parentheses. All times are in Central.
