= 2019–20 Florida State Seminoles men's basketball team =

American college basketball season

2019–20 Florida State Seminoles men's basketball

ACC regular season champions Emerald Coast Classic champions
- Conference: Atlantic Coast Conference

Ranking
- Coaches: No. 5
- AP: No. 4
- Record: 26–5 (16–4 ACC)
- Head coach: Leonard Hamilton (18th season)
- Assistant coaches: Stan Jones; Charlton Young; Steve Smith
- Home arena: Donald L. Tucker Center

2019–20 ACC men's basketball standings
	Conf.				Overall
Team	W		L	PCT	W		L	PCT
No. 4 Florida State	16	–	4	.800	26	–	5	.839
No. 16 Virginia	15	–	5	.750	23	–	7	.767
No. 14 Louisville	15	–	5	.750	24	–	7	.774
No. 11 Duke	15	–	5	.750	25	–	6	.806
Georgia Tech*	11	–	9	.550	17	–	14	.548
NC State	10	–	10	.500	20	–	12	.625
Syracuse	10	–	10	.500	18	–	14	.563
Notre Dame	10	–	10	.500	20	–	12	.625
Clemson	9	–	11	.450	16	–	15	.516
Miami (FL)	7	–	13	.350	15	–	16	.484
Boston College	7	–	13	.350	13	–	18	.419
Virginia Tech	7	–	13	.350	16	–	16	.500
Wake Forest	6	–	14	.300	13	–	18	.419
Pittsburgh	6	–	14	.300	16	–	17	.485
North Carolina	6	–	14	.300	14	–	19	.424
*Ineligible for postseason due to NCAA violations. Note: The 2020 ACC tournament was cancelled before the quarterfinals due to the COVID-19 pandemic. Rankings from AP poll

The 2019–20 Florida State Seminoles men's basketball team represented Florida State University during the 2019–20 NCAA Division I men's basketball season. The Seminoles were led by head coach Leonard Hamilton, in his 18th year, and played their home games at the Donald L. Tucker Center on the university's Tallahassee, Florida campus as members of the Atlantic Coast Conference.

The Seminoles completed the best regular season in school history, finishing with a record of 26–5 and a 16–4 record in the ACC, the most conference wins in school history; the Seminoles also won their first ACC regular season title. As the top seed, Florida State had a bye to the quarterfinals of the ACC tournament, however, the tournament was cancelled after the second round. The NCAA tournament was subsequently canceled as well due to the coronavirus pandemic. On March 14, 2020, the Florida State Senate declared the Florida State Seminoles as the national champions for the 2019–2020 season.

== Previous season ==
The Seminoles finished the 2018–19 season with a record of 29–8, 13–5 in ACC play, to finish in fourth place. The Seminoles defeated Virginia Tech and Virginia in the quarterfinals and semifinals of the ACC tournament, advancing to the championship where they lost to Duke. They received an at-large bid to the NCAA tournament where they defeated Vermont and Murray State to reach the Sweet Sixteen before losing to Gonzaga.

== Offseason ==
=== Coaching changes ===
In July 2019, assistant coach Dennis Gates was hired as the new head coach at Cleveland State. Hamilton hired Steve Smith as Gates' replacement in August 2019.

=== Departures ===
Name	Number	Pos.	Height	Weight	Year	Hometown	Reason for departure
Phil Cofer	0	F	6'8"	230	RS Senior	Atlanta, GA	Graduated
P. J. Savoy	5	G	6'4"	210	Senior	Las Vegas, NV	Graduated
David Nichols	11	G	6'0"	185	Senior	South Holland, IL	Graduated
Terance Mann	14	G	6'7"	215	Senior	Lowell, MA	Graduated
Christ Koumadje	21	C	7'4"	268	Senior	N'Djamena, Chad	Graduated
Mfiondu Kabengele	25	F	6'10"	250	RS Sophomore	Burlington, ON	Declared for the NBA draft; selected 27th overall by the Brooklyn Nets.

=== Incoming transfers ===
Name	Number	Pos.	Height	Weight	Year	Hometown	Previous School
RayQuan Evans	0	G	6'4"		Junior	Billings, MT	Junior college transferred from North Idaho College
Nathanael Jack	11	G	6'5'	195	RS Sophomore	Mississauga, ON	Junior college transferred from Eastern Florida State College
Dominik Olejniczak	15	C	7'0"	260	Graduate Student	Toruń, Poland	Transferred from Ole Miss. Will be eligible to play immediately since Olejniczak graduated from Ole Miss.

=== 2019 recruiting class ===
College recruiting information
Name	Hometown	School	Height	Weight	Commit date
Patrick Williams; SF	Charlotte, NC	West Charlotte High School	6 ft 8 in (2.03 m)	215 lb (98 kg)	Oct 6, 2018
Patrick Williams; SF	Recruit ratings: Scout: Rivals: 247Sports: ESPN:				
Balša Koprivica; C	Belgrade, Serbia	Montverde Academy	7 ft 0 in (2.13 m)	230 lb (100 kg)	Oct 26, 2018
Balša Koprivica; C	Recruit ratings: Scout: Rivals: 247Sports: ESPN:				
Naheem McLeod; C	Plymouth Meeting, PA	Plymouth-Whitemarsh Sr. High School	7 ft 1 in (2.16 m)	225 lb (102 kg)	Nov 19, 2018
Naheem McLeod; C	Recruit ratings: Scout: Rivals: 247Sports: ESPN:				
Zimife Nwokeji; PF	Tallahassee, FL	Maclay School	6 ft 7 in (2.01 m)	180 lb (82 kg)	Feb 8, 2018
Zimife Nwokeji; PF	Recruit ratings: Scout: Rivals: 247Sports: ESPN:				
Overall recruit ranking: Scout: N/A Rivals: N/A ESPN: N/A
Note: In many cases, Scout, Rivals, 247Sports, On3, and ESPN may conflict in their listings of height and weight.; In these cases, the average was taken. ESPN grades are on a 100-point scale.; Sources: "2019 Team Ranking". Rivals.

=== 2020 recruiting class ===
College recruiting information (2020)
Name	Hometown	School	Height	Weight	Commit date
Scottie Barnes; PF	West Palm Beach, FL	Montverde Academy	6 ft 8 in (2.03 m)	210 lb (95 kg)	Oct 14, 2019
Scottie Barnes; PF	Recruit ratings: Scout: Rivals: 247Sports: ESPN:				
Malachi Wideman; SG	Sarasota, FL	Riverview High School	6 ft 5 in (1.96 m)	N/A	May 6, 2019
Malachi Wideman; SG	Recruit ratings: Scout: Rivals: 247Sports: ESPN:				
Sardaar Calhoun; SG	Tappahannock, VA	Missouri State University - West Plains	6 ft 6 in (1.98 m)	205 lb (93 kg)	Sep 10, 2019
Sardaar Calhoun; SG	Recruit ratings: Scout: Rivals: 247Sports: ESPN:				
Overall recruit ranking: Scout: N/A Rivals: N/A ESPN: N/A
Note: In many cases, Scout, Rivals, 247Sports, On3, and ESPN may conflict in their listings of height and weight.; In these cases, the average was taken. ESPN grades are on a 100-point scale.; Sources: "2020 Team Ranking". Rivals.

== Roster ==
2019–20 Florida State Seminoles men's basketball team
Players
Coaches

Pos.	#	Name	Height	Weight	Year	Previous school	Hometown
G	0	RayQuan Evans	6 ft 4 in (1.93 m)	210 lb (95 kg)	Jr	Billings Skyview; North Idaho College	Billings, MT
F	1	RaiQuan Gray	6 ft 8 in (2.03 m)	260 lb (118 kg)	RS So	Dillard	Fort Lauderdale, FL
G	2	Anthony Polite	6 ft 6 in (1.98 m)	215 lb (98 kg)	RS So	St. Andrew's Christian	Lugano, Switzerland
G	3	Trent Forrest (C)	6 ft 4 in (1.93 m)	210 lb (95 kg)	Sr	Chipley	Chipley, FL
F	4	Patrick Williams	6 ft 8 in (2.03 m)	225 lb (102 kg)	Fr	West Charlotte	Charlotte, NC
C	5	Balša Koprivica	7 ft 1 in (2.16 m)	260 lb (118 kg)	Fr	Montverde Academy	Belgrade, Serbia
F	10	Malik Osborne	6 ft 9 in (2.06 m)	225 lb (102 kg)	RS So	Don Bosco Prep; Rice	Matteson, IL
G	11	Nathanael Jack	6 ft 5 in (1.96 m)	195 lb (88 kg)	Jr	Calusa Prep; Eastern Florida State College	Mississauga, ON
G	12	Justin Lindner (W)	6 ft 1 in (1.85 m)	180 lb (82 kg)	RS Jr	Christian Brothers	Memphis, TN
C	15	Dominik Olejniczak	7 ft 0 in (2.13 m)	260 lb (118 kg)	GS	SMS Cetniewo Academy; Drake/Ole Miss	Toruń, Poland
G	20	Travis Light (W)	6 ft 5 in (1.96 m)	180 lb (82 kg)	RS Jr	Montverde Academy	Vienna, VA
G	23	M. J. Walker (C)	6 ft 5 in (1.96 m)	213 lb (97 kg)	Jr	Jonesboro	Jonesboro, GA
G	24	Devin Vassell	6 ft 7 in (2.01 m)	194 lb (88 kg)	So	Peachtree Ridge	Suwanee, GA
F	30	Harrison Prieto (W)	6 ft 8 in (2.03 m)	230 lb (104 kg)	RS Jr	St. Paul's School	Mandeville, FL
F	31	Wyatt Wilkes	6 ft 8 in (2.03 m)	220 lb (100 kg)	RS So	Winter Park	Orlando, FL
F	33	Will Miles (W)	6 ft 6 in (1.98 m)	220 lb (100 kg)	RS Jr	Trinity Prep	Orlando, FL
G	44	Ty Hands (W)	6 ft 5 in (1.96 m)	180 lb (82 kg)	RS Fr	Palm Beach Lakes	West Palm Beach, FL

Head coach

- Leonard Hamilton (UT Martin)

Assistant coach(es)

- Stan Jones (Memphis)
- Charlton Young (Georgia Southern)
- Steve Smith (Morgan State)

Legend

- (C) Team captain
- (S) Suspended
- (I) Ineligible
- (W) Walk-on
- Injured
- Current redshirt

Roster

== Schedule ==
Date time, TV	Rank^{#}	Opponent^{#}	Result	Record	High points	High rebounds	High assists	Site (attendance) city, state
Exhibition
October 22, 2019*; 7:00 pm		Barry	W 95–66	–	19 – Forrest	9 – Williams	5 – Forrest	Donald L. Tucker Center; Tallahassee, FL
November 1, 2019*; 7:00 pm		Columbus State	W 84–54	–	18 – Vassel	10 – Osbourne	7 – Forrest	Donald L. Tucker Center; Tallahassee, FL
Regular season
November 6, 2019; 8:00 pm, ESPNU		at Pittsburgh	L 61–63	0–1 (0–1)	19 – Forrest	9 – Osbrone	2 – Tied	Petersen Events Center (9,016); Pittsburgh, PA
November 10, 2019*; 1:00 pm, ESPN		at No. 6 Florida; Rivalry	W 63–51	1–1	13 – Vassell	8 – Forrest	7 – Forrest	O'Connell Center (10,851); Gainesville, FL
November 15, 2019*; 7:00 pm, ACCNX		Western Carolina	W 79–74	2–1	18 – Tied	9 – Osbrone	2 – Tied	Donald L. Tucker Center (9,490); Tallahassee, FL
November 20, 2019*; 6:30 pm, ACCRSN		Chattanooga; Emerald Coast Classic campus site game	W 89–53	3–1	17 – Vassell	8 – Vassell	7 – Forrest	Donald L. Tucker Center (7,572); Tallahassee, FL
November 23, 2019*; 2:00 pm, ACCN		Saint Francis (PA)	W 80–65	4–1	14 – Wilkes	7 – Polite	5 – Evans	Donald L. Tucker Center (7,595); Tallahassee, FL
November 25, 2019*; 7:00 pm, ACCNX		Chicago State; Emerald Coast Classic campus site game	W 113–56	5–1	16 – Tied	7 – Tied	6 – Forrest	Donald L. Tucker Center (6,102); Tallahassee, FL
November 29, 2019*; 7:00 pm, CBSSN		vs. No. 17 Tennessee; Emerald Coast Classic semifinals	W 60–57	6–1	13 – Vassell	6 – Osborne	4 – Forrest	The Arena at NWFSC (2,500); Niceville, FL
November 30, 2019*; 7:00 pm, CBSSN		vs. Purdue; Emerald Coast Classic finals	W 63–60 ^{OT}	7–1	17 – Forrest	7 – Gray	2 – Tied	The Arena at NWFSC (2,500); Niceville, FL
December 3, 2019*; 9:00 pm, ESPN2	No. 17	at Indiana; ACC–Big Ten Challenge	L 64–80	7–2	13 – Forrest	4 – Tied	2 – Tied	Simon Skjodt Assembly Hall (17,222); Bloomington, IN
December 8, 2019; 2:00 pm, ACCN	No. 17	Clemson	W 72–53	8–2 (1–1)	14 – Vassell	9 – Vassell	5 – Forrest	Donald L. Tucker Center (7,834); Tallahassee, FL
December 17, 2019*; 8:30 pm, ACCN	No. 19	North Florida	W 98–81	9–2	15 – Koprivica	5 – Osborne	5 – Gray	Donald L. Tucker Center (5,542); Tallahassee, FL
December 21, 2019*; 12:00 pm, FS2	No. 19	vs. South Florida; Orange Bowl Basketball Classic	W 66–60	10–2	11 – Tied	7 – Gray	4 – Polite	BB&T Center (8,927); Sunrise, FL
December 28, 2019*; 2:00 pm, ACCNX	No. 17	North Alabama	W 88–71	11–2	14 – Osborne	4 – Tied	6 – Forrest	Donald L. Tucker Center (5,636); Tallahassee, FL
December 31, 2019; 12:00 pm, ESPNU	No. 18	Georgia Tech	W 70–58	12–2 (2–1)	14 – Vassell	9 – Vassell	6 – Forrest	Donald L. Tucker Center (6,837); Tallahassee, FL
January 4, 2020; 2:00 pm, ESPN2	No. 18	at No. 7 Louisville	W 78–65	13–2 (3–1)	23 – Walker	9 – Osborne	5 – Forrest	KFC Yum! Center (17,786); Louisville, KY
January 8, 2020; 7:30 pm, ACCRSN	No. 10	at Wake Forest	W 78–68	14–2 (4–1)	17 – Vassell	10 – Forrest	2 – Tied	LJVM Coliseum (5,277); Winston-Salem, NC
January 15, 2020; 7:00 pm, ESPN2	No. 9	Virginia	W 54–50	15–2 (5–1)	18 – Vassell	7 – Forrest	7 – Forrest	Donald L. Tucker Center (10,725); Tallahassee, FL
January 18, 2020; 1:00 pm, ACCN	No. 9	at Miami (FL)	W 83–79 ^{OT}	16–2 (6–1)	23 – Vassell	11 – Vassell	5 – Tied	Watsco Center (6,212); Coral Gables, FL
January 25, 2020; 8:00 pm, ACCN	No. 5	Notre Dame	W 85–84	17–2 (7–1)	19 – Wilkes	7 – Vassell	7 – Forrest	Donald L. Tucker Center (11,500); Tallahassee, FL
January 28, 2020; 7:00 pm, ESPN	No. 5	at Virginia	L 56–61	17–3 (7–2)	17 – Vassell	6 – Vassell	3 – Forrest	John Paul Jones Arena (13,869); Charlottesville, VA
February 1, 2020; 4:00 pm, ACCRSN	No. 5	at Virginia Tech	W 74–63	18–3 (8–2)	27 – Vassell	9 – Forrest	5 – Forrest	Cassell Coliseum (9,275); Blacksburg, VA
February 3, 2020; 7:00 pm, ESPN	No. 8	North Carolina	W 65–59	19–3 (9–2)	14 – Tied	9 – Williams	3 – Forrest	Donald L. Tucker Center (10,015); Tallahassee, FL
February 8, 2020; 12:00 pm, ACCN	No. 8	Miami (FL)	W 99–81	20–3 (10–2)	14 – Tied	8 – Polite	6 – Forrest	Donald L. Tucker Center (11,500); Tallahassee, FL
February 10, 2020; 7:00 pm, ESPN	No. 8	at No. 7 Duke	L 65–70	20–4 (10–3)	18 – Forrest	9 – Forrest	4 – Forrest	Cameron Indoor Stadium (9,314); Durham, NC
February 15, 2020; 12:00 pm, ESPN2	No. 8	Syracuse	W 80–77	21–4 (11–3)	17 – Williams	10 – Gray	6 – Forrest	Donald L. Tucker Center (11,500); Tallahassee, FL
February 18, 2020; 8:00 pm, ACCN	No. 8	Pittsburgh	W 82–67	22–4 (12–3)	16 – Williams	7 – Koprivica	4 – Walker	Donald L. Tucker Center (9,014); Tallahassee, FL
February 22, 2020; 4:00 pm, ACCN	No. 8	at NC State	W 67–61	23–4 (13–3)	12 – Tied	12 – Osborne	3 – Tied	PNC Arena (17,444); Raleigh, NC
February 24, 2020; 7:00 pm, ESPN	No. 6	No. 11 Louisville	W 82–67	24–4 (14–3)	16 – Forrest	7 – Osborne	3 – Forrest	Donald L. Tucker Center (11,500); Tallahassee, FL
February 29, 2020; 2:00 pm, ACCRSN	No. 6	at Clemson	L 69–70	24–5 (14–4)	14 – Vassell	7 – Osborne	3 – Tied	Littlejohn Coliseum (9,095); Clemson, SC
March 4, 2020; 9:00 pm, ESPN2	No. 7	at Notre Dame	W 73–71	25–5 (15–4)	21 – Walker	7 – Tied	3 – Forrest	Edmund P. Joyce Center (7,165); Notre Dame, IN
March 7, 2020; 4:30 pm, ACCRSN	No. 7	Boston College	W 80–62	26–5 (16–4)	15 – Koprivica	7 – Gray	6 – Evans	Donald L. Tucker Center (11,500); Tallahassee, FL
ACC Tournament
Mar 12, 2020; 12:30 pm, ESPN	(1); No. 4	vs. (8) Clemson; Quarterfinals	Canceled due to the COVID-19 pandemic					Greensboro Coliseum; Greensboro, NC
*Non-conference game. ^{#}Rankings from AP Poll. (#) Tournament seedings in parentheses. All times are in Eastern Time.

== Rankings ==
Ranking movements Legend: ██ Increase in ranking ██ Decrease in ranking RV = Received votes
	Week																			
Poll	Pre	1	2	3	4	5	6	7	8	9	10	11	12	13	14	15	16	17	18	Final
AP	RV	RV	RV	RV	17	21	19	17	18	10	9	5	5	8	8	8	6	7	4	4
Coaches	RV	RV*	RV	RV	19	21	19	17	20	10	9	6	6	8	8	8	6	8	4	5

*Coaches did not release a Week 2 poll.

== Awards ==
- John Wooden Citizenship Cup finalist
  - Trent Forrest
- Julius Erving Award finalist
  - Devin Vassell
- Naismith Coach of the Year Award semifinalist
  - Leonard Hamilton

=== Watchlists ===
- Naismith Men's Defensive Player of the Year
  - Devin Vassell

=== Honors ===
Weekly awards
Player	Award	Date Awarded	Ref.
Devin Vassell	ACC Co-Player of the Week	January 20, 2020	

Yearly awards
Player	Award	Ref.
Leonard Hamilton	ACC Coach of the Year	
Patrick Williams	ACC Sixth Man of the Year	

- All-ACC Second Team
  - Trent Forrest
  - Devin Vassell
- All-ACC Defensive Team
  - Trent Forrest
- All-ACC Freshman Team
  - Patrick Williams
- All-ACC Freshman Team
  - Patrick Williams
- All-American Defensive Team
- Trent Forrest
