= 2020 ASUN men's basketball tournament =

- Classification: Division I
- Season: 2019–20
- Teams: 8
- Site: Campus sites
- Champions: Liberty (2nd title)
- Winning coach: Ritchie McKay (2nd title)
- MVP: Caleb Homesley (Liberty)
- Television: ESPN, ESPN+

2019–20 ASUN men's basketball standings
	Conf.				Overall
Team	W		L	PCT	W		L	PCT
Liberty†	13	–	3	.813	30	–	4	.882
North Florida	13	–	3	.813	21	–	12	.636
Lipscomb	9	–	7	.563	16	–	16	.500
Stetson	9	–	7	.563	16	–	17	.485
North Alabama*	8	–	8	.500	13	–	17	.433
Florida Gulf Coast	7	–	9	.438	10	–	22	.313
Jacksonville	7	–	9	.438	14	–	18	.438
NJIT	6	–	10	.375	9	–	21	.300
Kennesaw State	0	–	16	.000	1	–	28	.034
† 2020 ASUN tournament winner * Ineligible for the 2020 NCAA tournament due to transition period

The 2020 ASUN men's basketball tournament is the conference postseason tournament for the ASUN Conference. The tournament is the 41st year the league has conducted a postseason tournament. The tournament was held March 3, 5, and 8, 2020 at campus sites of the higher seeds. The winner received the conference's automatic bid to the NCAA tournament.

== Seeds ==
The top eight teams in the conference standings qualify for the tournament. The teams are seeded by record in conference, with a tiebreaker system to seed teams with identical conference records.

The two tiebreakers used by the ASUN are: 1) head-to-head record of teams with identical record and 2) NCAA NET Rankings available on day following the conclusion of ASUN regular season play.

Seed	School	Conference	Tiebreaker
1	Liberty	13–3	NET Ranking: 64
2	North Florida	13–3	NET Ranking: 153
3	Lipscomb	9–7	NET Ranking: 256
4	Stetson	9–7	NET Ranking: 306
5	North Alabama	8–8	
6	Florida Gulf Coast	7–9	2–0 vs. Jacksonville
7	Jacksonville	7–9	0–2 vs. FGCU
8	NJIT	6–10	
DNQ	Kennesaw State	0–16	

== Schedule ==
Game	Time	Matchup	Score	Television	Attendance
Quarterfinals – Tuesday, March 3
1	7:00 pm	No. 8 NJIT vs. No. 1 Liberty	49–55	ESPN+	3,042
2	7:00 pm	No. 5 North Alabama at No. 4 Stetson	72–82	ESPN+	681
3	7:00 pm	No. 7 Jacksonville at No. 2 North Florida	88–91	ESPN+	2,797
4	8:00 pm	No. 6 Florida Gulf Coast at No. 3 Lipscomb	63–66	ESPN+	2,191
Semifinals – Thursday, March 5
5	7:00 pm	No. 4 Stetson at No. 1 Liberty	62–66	ESPN+	2,966
6	7:00 pm	No. 3 Lipscomb at No. 2 North Florida	73–71	ESPN+	2,736
Championship – Sunday, March 8
7	3:00 pm	No. 3 Lipscomb at No. 1 Liberty	57–73	ESPN	7,422
Game times in ET. Rankings denote tournament seeding. All games hosted by higher-seeded team.

== Bracket ==
Quarterfinals; Tuesday, March 3, 2020; ESPN+
1	Liberty	55
8	NJIT	49
4	Stetson	82
5	North Alabama	72
2	North Florida	91
7	Jacksonville	88
3	Lipscomb	68
6	Florida Gulf Coast	63

Semifinals; Thursday, March 5, 2020; ESPN+
1	Liberty	66
4	Stetson	62
2	North Florida	71
3	Lipscomb	73

Championship; Sunday, March 8, 2020; ESPN
1	Liberty	73
3	Lipscomb	57

== Game summaries ==
=== Quarterfinals ===
ESPN+

March 3
7:00 PM

Report

#1 Liberty 55, #8 NJIT 49
Scoring by half: 22-16, 33-33
Pts: Homesley (14); Rebs: James (10); Asts: Cuffee (4)	Pts: Cooks (17); Rebs: Cooks (12); Asts: Tied (3)

Vines Center
Lynchburg, VA
Attendance: 3,042
Referees: Chris King, Garrick Shannon, Wil Howard

ESPN+

March 3
7:00 PM

Report

#4 Stetson 82, #5 North Alabama 72
Scoring by half: 35-34, 47-38
Pts: Aninye (21); Rebs: Diawara (7); Asts: Tied (3)	Pts: Blackmon (22); Rebs: James (9); Asts: Brim (6)

Edmunds Center
DeLand, FL
Attendance: 681
Referees: Stephen Divine, Josue Nieves, Keith Patterson

ESPN+

March 3
7:00 PM

Report

#2 North Florida 91, #7 Jacksonville 88
Scoring by half: 47-42, 44-46
Pts: Tied (21); Rebs: Aminu (6); Asts: Gandia-Rosa (8)	Pts: Wood (27); Rebs: Bell (11); Asts: Arnold (4)

UNF Arena
Jacksonville, FL
Attendance: 2,797
Referees: Jose Carrion, Jon Broska, Art Vaulk

ESPN+

March 3
8:00 PM

Report

#3 Lipscomb 68, #6 Florida Gulf Coast 63
Scoring by half: 32-33, 36-30
Pts: Asadullah (40); Rebs: Asadullah (14); Asts: Asadullah (3)	Pts: Catto (20); Rebs: Largie (7); Asts: Tied (3)

Allen Arena
Nashville, TN
Attendance: 2,191
Referees: Sidney Cohen, John Hampton, Landon Brandes

=== Semifinals ===
ESPN+

March 5
7:00 PM

Report

#1 Liberty 66, #4 Stetson 62
Scoring by half: 22-25, 44-37
Pts: Homesley (26); Rebs: Homesley (8); Asts: Tied (3)	Pts: Jones (15); Rebs: Jones (7); Asts: Jones (3)

Vines Center
Lynchburg, VA
Attendance: 2,966
Referees: Jose Carrion, Vladimir Voyard-Tadal, Todd Austin

ESPN+

March 5
7:00 PM

Report

#2 North Florida 71, #3 Lipscomb 73
Scoring by half: 33-42, 38-31
Pts: Hendricksen (19); Rebs: Aminu (9); Asts: Gandia-Rosa (5)	Pts: Asadullah (27); Rebs: Asadullah (19); Asts: Asadullah (4)

UNF Arena
Jacksonville, FL
Attendance: 2,736
Referees: Brian Shey, Chuck Jones, R.B. Clyburn

=== Championship ===
ESPN

March 8
3:00 PM

Report

#1 Liberty 73, #3 Lipscomb 57
Scoring by half: 45-26, 28-31
Pts: Tied (16); Rebs: Homesley (9); Asts: Baxter-Bell (4)	Pts: Asadullah (22); Rebs: Asadullah (9); Asts: Tied (3)

Vines Center
Lynchburg, VA
Attendance: 7,728
Referees: Jason Baker, Bart Lenox, Steven Anderson
