= 2019–20 Lipscomb Bisons men's basketball team =

American college basketball season

2019–20 Lipscomb Bisons men's basketball
- Conference: Atlantic Sun Conference
- Record: 16–16 (9–7 ASUN)
- Head coach: Lennie Acuff (1st season)
- Assistant coaches: Kevin Carroll; Roger Idstrom; Tyler Murray
- Home arena: Allen Arena

2019–20 ASUN men's basketball standings
	Conf.				Overall
Team	W		L	PCT	W		L	PCT
Liberty†	13	–	3	.813	30	–	4	.882
North Florida	13	–	3	.813	21	–	12	.636
Lipscomb	9	–	7	.563	16	–	16	.500
Stetson	9	–	7	.563	16	–	17	.485
North Alabama*	8	–	8	.500	13	–	17	.433
Florida Gulf Coast	7	–	9	.438	10	–	22	.313
Jacksonville	7	–	9	.438	14	–	18	.438
NJIT	6	–	10	.375	9	–	21	.300
Kennesaw State	0	–	16	.000	1	–	28	.034
† 2020 ASUN tournament winner * Ineligible for the 2020 NCAA tournament due to transition period

The 2019–20 Lipscomb Bisons men's basketball team represented Lipscomb University in the 2019–20 NCAA Division I men's basketball season. The Bisons, led by first-year head coach Lennie Acuff, played their home games at the Allen Arena in Nashville, Tennessee as members of the Atlantic Sun Conference.

== Previous season ==
The Bisons finished the 2018–19 season 29–8 overall, 14–2 in ASUN play to finish as regular season co-champions, along with Liberty. In the ASUN tournament, they defeated Kennesaw State in the quarterfinals, NJIT in the semifinals, before losing to Liberty in the championship game. As a regular season league champion who failed to win their league tournament, they received an automatic bid to the NIT, where they made it all the way to the championship game, before losing to Texas.

On April 10, 2019, head coach Casey Alexander announced that he would be stepping down, in order to take the head coaching job at Belmont. On April 24, 2019, Lennie Acuff was announced as the next head coach.

== Roster ==
2019–20 Lipscomb Bisons men's basketball team
Players
Coaches

Pos.	#	Name	Height	Weight	Year	Previous school	Hometown
G	0	KJ Johnson	6 ft 1 in (1.85 m)	154 lb (70 kg)	Fr	Marshall County HS	Lewisburg, TN
G	1	Greg Jones	6 ft 3 in (1.91 m)	195 lb (88 kg)	So	Wakeland HS	Frisco, TX
G	2	Andrew Fleming	6 ft 5 in (1.96 m)	205 lb (93 kg)	Sr	Chattanooga	Nashville, TN
G	3	Michael Buckland	6 ft 5 in (1.96 m)	197 lb (89 kg)	Sr	Wesleyan Christian Academy	High Point, NC
F	4	Jaxson Strates	6 ft 9 in (2.06 m)	210 lb (95 kg)	RS Fr	Lake Highland Prep	Winter Park, FL
F	5	Kaleb Coleman	6 ft 5 in (1.96 m)	204 lb (93 kg)	Fr	Oak Ridge HS	Orlando, FL
G	10	Jake Wolfe	6 ft 5 in (1.96 m)	197 lb (89 kg)	So	Aurora Christian School	Aurora, IL
G	11	Alex Jones	5 ft 10 in (1.78 m)	170 lb (77 kg)	So	Buford HS	Alpharetta, GA
G	12	Carson Cary	6 ft 0 in (1.83 m)	158 lb (72 kg)	Fr	Columbia Academy	Columbia, TN
F	13	Parker Hazen	6 ft 6 in (1.98 m)	201 lb (91 kg)	Jr	Iowa Western CC	Columbia City, IN
G	14	Tanner Shulman	6 ft 4 in (1.93 m)	198 lb (90 kg)	Fr	McCallie School	Chattanooga, TN
G	20	John Matt Merritt	6 ft 1 in (1.85 m)	170 lb (77 kg)	Jr	Lipscomb Academy	Nashville, TN
F	22	Jacob Hobbs	6 ft 6 in (1.98 m)	190 lb (86 kg)	Fr	Central Hardin HS	Elizabethtown, KY
C	23	Ahsan Asadullah	6 ft 8 in (2.03 m)	265 lb (120 kg)	RS So	North Clayton HS	Atlanta, GA
G	25	Miles Miller	6 ft 2 in (1.88 m)	168 lb (76 kg)	RS Fr	Ole Miss	Meridian, MS
F	35	Luke Howard	6 ft 7 in (2.01 m)	192 lb (87 kg)	Fr	N/A	Abbotsford, British Columbia

Head coach

- Lennie Acuff (Shorter)

Assistant coach(es)

- Kevin Carroll (Berry)
- Roger Idstrom (Mars Hill)
- Tyler Murray (Hampden–Sydney)

Legend

- (C) Team captain
- (S) Suspended
- (I) Ineligible
- (W) Walk-on
- Injured
- Current redshirt

Roster
Last update: September 20, 2019

== Schedule and results ==
Date time, TV	Rank^{#}	Opponent^{#}	Result	Record	Site (attendance) city, state
Non-conference regular season
November 5, 2019*; 6:30 pm, ESPN+		Rhodes	W 104–55	1–0	Allen Arena (1,878); Nashville, TN
November 9, 2019*; 3:00 pm, ESPN+		Middle Tennessee	L 70–73	1–1	Allen Arena (2,834); Nashville, TN
November 12, 2019*; 8:00 pm, ESPN+		at Tennessee State	L 78–79	1–2	Gentry Complex (4,582); Nashville, TN
November 15, 2019*; 7:00 pm, ESPN+		at Duquesne	L 36–58	1–3	Kerr Fitness Center (1,143); McCandless, PA
November 20, 2019*; 6:30 pm, ESPN+		Belmont	L 67–73	1–4	Allen Arena (3,628); Nashville, TN
November 22, 2019*; 7:00 pm		at Navy	W 65–61	2–4	Alumni Hall (763); Annapolis, MD
November 25, 2019*; 6:00 pm, ESPN+		at Tennessee Tech	W 78–65	3–4	Eblen Center (1,320); Cookeville, TN
November 30, 2019*; 11:00 am, FS2		at No. 25 Xavier	L 62–87	3–5	Cintas Center (9,960); Cincinnati, OH
December 3, 2019*; 7:30 pm		at Belmont	L 75–80	3–6	Curb Event Center (3,318); Nashville, TN
December 8, 2019*; 4:00 pm, ESPN+		Trevecca	W 96–72	4–6	Allen Arena (1,537); Nashville, TN
December 17, 2019*; 6:30 pm, ESPN+		Tennessee Tech	W 78–60	5–6	Allen Arena (1,364); Nashville, TN
December 20, 2019*; 6:00 pm, ESPN+		at Vermont	L 63–86	5–7	Patrick Gym (2,641); Burlington, VT
December 29, 2019*; 3:00 pm, SECN		at No. 8 Auburn	L 59–86	5–8	Auburn Arena (9,121); Auburn, AL
Atlantic Sun Conference regular season
January 2, 2020; 6:00 pm, ESPN+		at Stetson	W 66–63	6–8 (1–0)	Edmunds Center (482); DeLand, FL
January 4, 2020; 6:00 pm, ESPN+		at Florida Gulf Coast	L 61–68	6–9 (1–1)	Alico Arena (2,644); Fort Myers, FL
January 9, 2020; 6:30 pm, ESPN+		Kennesaw State	W 85–73	7–9 (2–1)	Allen Arena (1,435); Nashville, TN
January 11, 2020; 4:00 pm, ESPN+		North Alabama	L 69–82	7–10 (2–2)	Allen Arena (1,774); Nashville, TN
January 16, 2020; 2:00 pm, ESPN+		at NJIT	L 57–75	7–11 (2–3)	Wellness and Events Center (2,016); Newark, NJ
January 18, 2020; 6:00 pm, ESPN+		at Liberty	L 60–67	7–12 (2–4)	Vines Center (6,008); Lynchburg, VA
January 23, 2020; 6:30 pm, ESPN+		Jacksonville	L 85–89 ^{OT}	7–13 (2–5)	Allen Arena (1,261); Nashville, TN
January 25, 2020; 4:00 pm, ESPN+		North Florida	W 85–73	8–13 (3–5)	Allen Arena (1,733); Nashville, TN
February 1, 2020; 4:00 pm, ESPN+		Stetson	L 53–55	8–14 (3–6)	Allen Arena (1,845); Nashville, TN
February 6, 2020; 6:00 pm, ESPN+		at North Alabama	W 73–71	9–14 (4–6)	Flowers Hall (978); Florence, AL
February 8, 2020; 3:30 pm, ESPN+		at Kennesaw State	W 72–66	10–14 (5–6)	KSU Convocation Center (1,677); Kennesaw, GA
February 13, 2020; 6:30 pm, ESPN+		NJIT	W 77–63	11–14 (6–6)	Allen Arena (1,485); Nashville, TN
February 15, 2020; 4:00 pm, ESPN+		Florida Gulf Coast	W 64–54	12–14 (7–6)	Allen Arena (3,821); Nashville, TN
February 20, 2020; 6:00 pm, ESPN+		at Jacksonville	W 68–67	13–14 (8–6)	Swisher Gymnasium (1,069); Jacksonville, FL
February 22, 2020; 4:00 pm, ESPN+		at North Florida	L 74–82	13–15 (8–7)	UNF Arena (2,221); Jacksonville, FL
February 29, 2020; 4:00 pm, ESPN+		Liberty	W 77–71	14–15 (9–7)	Allen Arena (3,625); Nashville, TN
Atlantic Sun tournament
March 3, 2020; 7:00 pm, ESPN+	(3)	(6) Florida Gulf Coast; Quarterfinals	W 68–63	15–15	Allen Arena (2,191); Nashville, TN
March 5, 2020; 7:00 pm, ESPN+	(3)	at (2) North Florida; Semifinals	W 73–71	16–15	UNF Arena (2,736); Jacksonville, FL
March 8, 2020; 3:00 pm, ESPN	(3)	at (1) Liberty; Championship	L 57–73	16–16	Vines Center (7,728); Lynchburg, VA
*Non-conference game. ^{#}Rankings from AP Poll. (#) Tournament seedings in parentheses. All times are in Central.
