= 2019–20 Stetson Hatters men's basketball team =

American college basketball season

2019–20 Stetson Hatters men's basketball
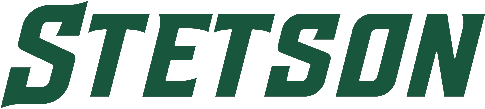
- Conference: Atlantic Sun Conference
- Record: 16–17 (9–7 ASUN)
- Head coach: Donnie Jones (1st season)
- Assistant coaches: Jonathan Mitchell; Brendan Suhr; Adam Williams
- Home arena: Edmunds Center

2019–20 ASUN men's basketball standings
	Conf.				Overall
Team	W		L	PCT	W		L	PCT
Liberty†	13	–	3	.813	30	–	4	.882
North Florida	13	–	3	.813	21	–	12	.636
Lipscomb	9	–	7	.563	16	–	16	.500
Stetson	9	–	7	.563	16	–	17	.485
North Alabama*	8	–	8	.500	13	–	17	.433
Florida Gulf Coast	7	–	9	.438	10	–	22	.313
Jacksonville	7	–	9	.438	14	–	18	.438
NJIT	6	–	10	.375	9	–	21	.300
Kennesaw State	0	–	16	.000	1	–	28	.034
† 2020 ASUN tournament winner * Ineligible for the 2020 NCAA tournament due to transition period

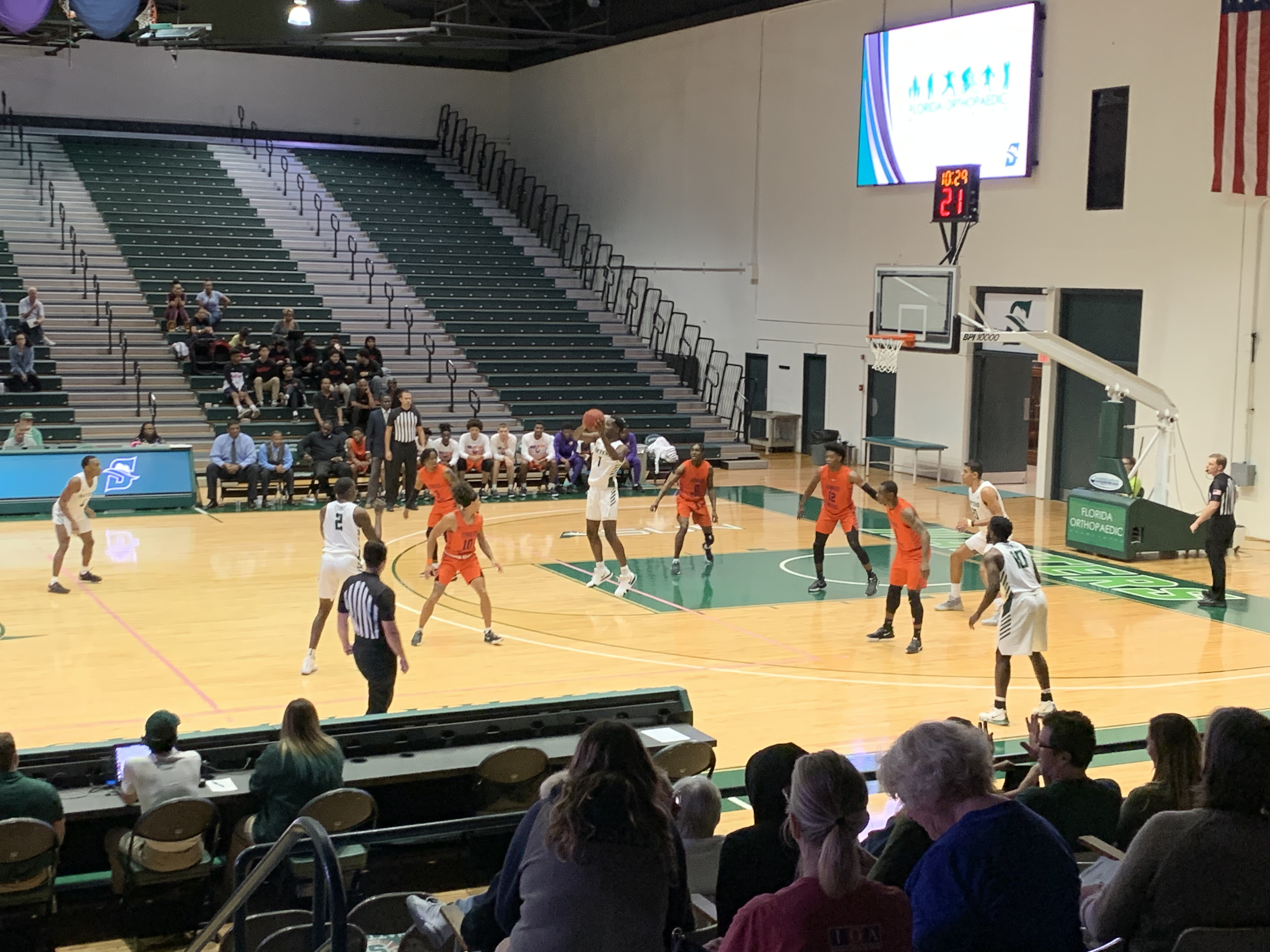
Stetson (white) taking on Edward Waters (orange) in a preseason exhibition game, November 1, 2019

The 2019–20 Stetson Hatters men's basketball team represented Stetson University in the 2019–20 NCAA Division I men's basketball season. The Hatters, led by first-year head coach Donnie Jones, played their home games at the Edmunds Center in DeLand, Florida as members of the Atlantic Sun Conference (ASUN).

The Hatters finished the season 16–17, 9–7 in ASUN play, to finish in a tie for third place. As the #4 seed in the ASUN tournament, the Hatters defeated the #5 seed North Alabama in the quarterfinals, 82–72, before falling to the top seed and eventual champions, Liberty, in the semifinals, 62–66.

== Previous season ==
The Hatters finished the 2018–19 season 7–24 overall, 3–13 in ASUN play, to finish in a tie for eighth place, but after tiebreakers, they missed the ASUN tournament.

Following the conclusion of the season, Stetson fired head coach Corey Williams, who finished his time at Stetson with a six-season record of 58 wins and 133 losses. On March 29, 2019, Donnie Jones was named as Williams' successor.

== Roster ==
2019–20 Stetson Hatters men's basketball team
Players
Coaches

Pos.	#	Name	Height	Weight	Year	Previous school	Hometown
G	0	Christiaan Jones	6 ft 5 in (1.96 m)	195 lb (88 kg)	Jr	Cardinal Newman HS	Columbia, SC
G/F	1	Wheza Panzo	6 ft 7 in (2.01 m)	190 lb (86 kg)	Fr	The Potter's House (FL)	Mississauga, ON
G	2	Rob Perry	6 ft 3 in (1.91 m)	210 lb (95 kg)	Fr	4A Sports Academy	Orlando, FL
G	3	Terry Ivery	5 ft 9 in (1.75 m)	170 lb (77 kg)	Fr	The Villages Charter HS	The Villages, FL
G	4	Jahlil Rawley	6 ft 4 in (1.93 m)	185 lb (84 kg)	Sr	Shelton State CC	Durham, NC
G	5	Jaret Griffith	6 ft 4 in (1.93 m)	190 lb (86 kg)	Fr	Akron Coventry HS	Huron, OH
G	10	Kenny Aninye	6 ft 1 in (1.85 m)	185 lb (84 kg)	Jr	Wheeler HS	Marietta, GA
G	11	Alex Ionesco	6 ft 2 in (1.88 m)	195 lb (88 kg)	So	New Hampton Prep	Houston, TX
G	12	Jalen Crutchfield	6 ft 4 in (1.93 m)	190 lb (86 kg)	So	Norman North HS	Norman, OK
F/C	15	Mahamadou Diawara	6 ft 10 in (2.08 m)	235 lb (107 kg)	Fr	Massanutten Military Academy	Bamako, Mali
F	20	Cyriaque Foucart	6 ft 9 in (2.06 m)	225 lb (102 kg)	So	New Mexico Military Institute	Paris, France
F	21	Ricky Gouety	6 ft 10 in (2.08 m)	210 lb (95 kg)	RS Sr	Indian Hills CC	Abidjan, Ivory Coast
G	22	Chase Johnston	6 ft 2 in (1.88 m)	185 lb (84 kg)	Fr	Purdue Fort Wayne	Boca Raton, FL
F	33	Wyatt Hollmann	6 ft 7 in (2.01 m)	210 lb (95 kg)	So	Embry–Riddle	DeLand, FL
F	35	Joel Kabimba	6 ft 8 in (2.03 m)	210 lb (95 kg)	Fr	Middleburg Academy	Kinshasa, Democratic Republic of the Congo

Head coach

- Donnie Jones (Pikeville)

Assistant coach(es)

- Jonathan Mitchell (Rutgers)
- Brendan Suhr (Montclair State)
- Adam Williams (Marshall)

Legend

- (C) Team captain
- (S) Suspended
- (I) Ineligible
- (W) Walk-on
- Injured
- Current redshirt

Roster
Last update: January 23, 2020

== Schedule and results ==
Date time, TV	Rank^{#}	Opponent^{#}	Result	Record	Site (attendance) city, state
Exhibition
November 1, 2019*; 7:00 p.m.		Edward Waters	W 65–60		Edmunds Center; DeLand, FL
Non-conference regular season
November 5, 2019*; 8:00 p.m.		Trinity Baptist	W 84–26	1–0	Edmunds Center (529); DeLand, FL
November 9, 2019*; 7:00 p.m.		at Western Illinois	W 77–75	2–0	Western Hall (340); Macomb, IL
November 16, 2019*; 7:00 p.m.		at Purdue Fort Wayne; Ohio State Classic	L 55–79	2–1	Allen County War Memorial Coliseum (1,269); Fort Wayne, IN
November 18, 2019*; 8:30 p.m., BTN		at No. 10 Ohio State; Ohio State Classic	L 51–86	2–2	Value City Arena (9,774); Columbus, OH
November 22, 2019*; 6:00 p.m.		vs. Iona; ASUN/MAAC Challenge	L 55–60	2–3	HP Field House (148); Lake Buena Vista, FL
November 23, 2019*; 8:30 p.m.		vs. Monmouth; ASUN/MAAC Challenge	W 63–55	3–3	HP Field House (121); Lake Buena Vista, FL
November 24, 2019*; 2:00 p.m.		Western Carolina	L 64–70	3–4	Edmunds Center (522); DeLand, FL
November 26, 2019*; 7:00 p.m.		Florida College	W 72–60	4–4	Edmunds Center (412); DeLand, FL
November 30, 2019*; 4:00 p.m.		at Kent State; Ohio State Classic	L 53–77	4–5	MAC Center (1,454); Kent, OH
December 3, 2019*; 7:00 p.m.		Bethune–Cookman	W 72–67	5–5	Edmunds Center; DeLand, FL
December 7, 2019*; 1:00 p.m.		at VMI	L 61–88	5–6	Cameron Hall (2,412); Lexington, VA
December 15, 2019*; 4:00 p.m.		Longwood	L 72–76	5–7	Edmunds Center (359); DeLand, FL
December 17, 2019*; 6:00 p.m., ESPN+		at UNC Asheville	L 76–78	5–8	Kimmel Arena (1,891); Asheville, NC
December 22, 2019*; 2:00 p.m., ESPN+		FIU	L 67–83	5–9	Edmunds Center (363); DeLand, FL
December 30, 2019*; 3:00 p.m., SECN+		at South Carolina	W 63–56	6–9	Colonial Life Arena (10,985); Columbia, SC
Atlantic Sun Conference regular season
January 2, 2020; 7:00 p.m., ESPN+		Lipscomb	L 63–66	6–10 (0–1)	Edmunds Center (482); DeLand, FL
January 4, 2020; 4:30 p.m., ESPN+		at Kennesaw State	W 57–54	7–10 (1–1)	KSU Convocation Center (1,086); Kennesaw, GA
January 11, 2020; 4:00 p.m., ESPN+		Florida Gulf Coast	L 62–66	7–11 (1–2)	Edmunds Center (628); DeLand, FL
January 16, 2020; 7:00 p.m., ESPN+		at North Alabama	W 54–49	8–11 (2–2)	Flowers Hall (847); Florence, AL
January 18, 2020; 6:00 p.m., ESPN+		at Jacksonville	W 64–59	9–11 (3–2)	Swisher Gymnasium (767); Jacksonville, FL
January 23, 2020; 7:00 p.m., ESPN+		NJIT	W 65–64	10–11 (4–2)	Edmunds Center (680); DeLand, FL
January 25, 2020; 4:00 p.m., ESPN+		Liberty	W 48–43	11–11 (5–2)	Edmunds Center (862); DeLand, FL
January 30, 2020; 7:00 p.m., ESPN+		at North Florida	L 65–78	11–12 (5–3)	UNF Arena (1,611); Jacksonville, FL
February 1, 2020; 5:00 p.m., ESPN+		at Lipscomb	W 55–53	12–12 (6–3)	Allen Arena (1,845); Nashville, TN
February 6, 2020; 7:00 p.m., ESPN+		at Florida Gulf Coast	W 65–62	13–12 (7–3)	Alico Arena (2,657); Fort Myers, FL
February 13, 2020; 7:00 p.m., ESPN+		North Alabama	W 75–64	14–12 (8–3)	Edmunds Center (945); DeLand, FL
February 15, 2020; 4:00 p.m., ESPN+		Kennesaw State	W 59–42	15–12 (9–3)	Edmunds Center; DeLand, FL
February 20, 2020; 7:00 p.m., ESPN+		at NJIT	L 69–78	15–13 (9–4)	Wellness and Events Center (569); Newark, NJ
February 22, 2020; 5:00 p.m., ESPN+		at Liberty	L 49–77	15–14 (9–5)	Vines Center (6,762); Lynchburg, VA
February 27, 2020; 7:00 p.m., ESPN+		North Florida	L 72–85	15–15 (9–6)	Edmunds Center (798); DeLand, FL
February 29, 2020; 4:00 p.m., ESPN+		Jacksonville	L 52–53	15–16 (9–7)	Edmunds Center (768); DeLand, FL
Atlantic Sun tournament
March 3, 2020; 7:00 p.m., ESPN+	(4)	(5) North Alabama; Quarterfinals	W 82–72	16–16	Edmunds Center (681); DeLand, FL
March 5, 2020; 7:00 p.m., ESPN+	(4)	at (1) Liberty; Semifinals	L 62–66	16–17	Vines Center (6,762); Lynchburg, VA
*Non-conference game. ^{#}Rankings from AP poll. (#) Tournament seedings in parentheses. All times are in Eastern.
