= 2019–20 North Florida Ospreys men's basketball team =

American college basketball season

2019–20 North Florida Ospreys men's basketball
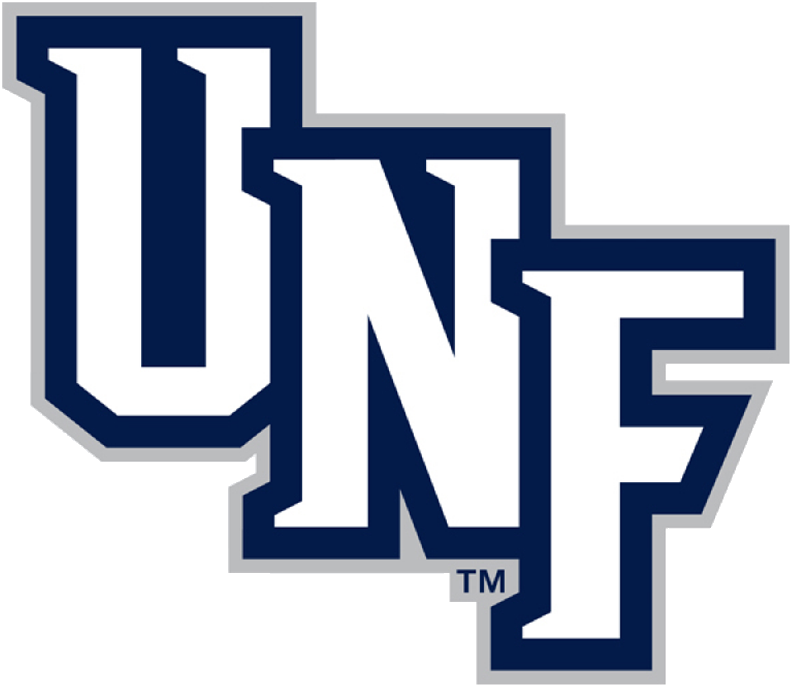

Atlantic Sun regular season co-champions
- Conference: Atlantic Sun Conference
- Record: 21–12 (13–3 ASUN)
- Head coach: Matthew Driscoll (11th season)
- Assistant coaches: Bobby Kennen; Bruce Evans; Stephen Perkins
- Home arena: UNF Arena

2019–20 ASUN men's basketball standings
| | Conf. | | | | Overall |
| Team | W | | L | PCT | W | | L | PCT |
|---|---|---|---|---|---|---|---|---|
| Liberty† | 13 | – | 3 | .813 | 30 | – | 4 | .882 |
| North Florida | 13 | – | 3 | .813 | 21 | – | 12 | .636 |
| Lipscomb | 9 | – | 7 | .563 | 16 | – | 16 | .500 |
| Stetson | 9 | – | 7 | .563 | 16 | – | 17 | .485 |
| North Alabama* | 8 | – | 8 | .500 | 13 | – | 17 | .433 |
| Florida Gulf Coast | 7 | – | 9 | .438 | 10 | – | 22 | .313 |
| Jacksonville | 7 | – | 9 | .438 | 14 | – | 18 | .438 |
| NJIT | 6 | – | 10 | .375 | 9 | – | 21 | .300 |
| Kennesaw State | 0 | – | 16 | .000 | 1 | – | 28 | .034 |
† 2020 ASUN tournament winner * Ineligible for the 2020 NCAA tournament due to transition period

The 2019–20 North Florida Ospreys men's basketball team represented the University of North Florida in the 2019–20 NCAA Division I men's basketball season. The Ospreys, led by 11th-year head coach Matthew Driscoll, played their home games at the UNF Arena in Jacksonville, Florida as members of the Atlantic Sun Conference.

== Previous season ==
The Ospreys finished the 2018–19 season 16–17 overall, 9–7 in ASUN play to finish in a tie for third place. In the ASUN tournament, they defeated North Alabama in the quarterfinals, before losing to Liberty in the semifinals.

== Roster ==
2019–20 North Florida Ospreys men's basketball team
Players
Coaches

| Pos. | # | Name | Height | Weight | Year | Previous school | Hometown |
|---|---|---|---|---|---|---|---|
| G | 0 | Emmanuel Adedoyin | 6 ft 2 in (1.88 m) | 161 lb (73 kg) | Fr | Oak Ridge HS | Orlando, FL |
| G/F | 1 | Emmanuel Lambright | 6 ft 6 in (1.98 m) | 210 lb (95 kg) | RS So | Sarasota HS | Sarasota, FL |
| F | 2 | Wajid Aminu | 6 ft 7 in (2.01 m) | 197 lb (89 kg) | Sr | Wheeler HS | Stone Mountain, GA |
| G | 3 | J.T. Escobar | 6 ft 2 in (1.88 m) | 186 lb (84 kg) | RS Sr | Ole Miss | Tallahassee, FL |
| F | 4 | Ezekiel Balogun | 6 ft 6 in (1.98 m) | 238 lb (108 kg) | Sr | Eastern Florida State College | Lagos, Nigeria |
| F | 5 | Dorian James | 6 ft 7 in (2.01 m) | 202 lb (92 kg) | RS Fr | Chain of Lakes Collegiate HS | Winter Haven, FL |
| G | 10 | Ivan Gandia-Rosa | 6 ft 1 in (1.85 m) | 193 lb (88 kg) | Sr | College of Central Florida | Caguas, Puerto Rico |
| G/F | 11 | Garrett Sams | 6 ft 7 in (2.01 m) | 209 lb (95 kg) | Sr | Westview HS | Martin, TN |
| G | 12 | Ryan Burkhardt | 6 ft 4 in (1.93 m) | 184 lb (83 kg) | Jr | St. Augustine HS | St. Augustine, FL |
| G | 15 | Jose Placer | 6 ft 1 in (1.85 m) | 174 lb (79 kg) | So | UMBC | Orlando, FL |
| F | 21 | Josh Endicott | 6 ft 8 in (2.03 m) | 190 lb (86 kg) | So | Motlow State CC | Baxter, TN |
| F | 22 | Trip Day | 6 ft 7 in (2.01 m) | 216 lb (98 kg) | Jr | Glenwood School | Columbus, GA |
| F | 23 | Carter Hendricksen | 6 ft 7 in (2.01 m) | 217 lb (98 kg) | So | Lexington Christian Academy | Lexington, KY |
| G | 24 | Christian Schach | 6 ft 1 in (1.85 m) | 188 lb (85 kg) | So | Tampa Prep | Tampa, FL |

Head coach

- Matthew Driscoll (Slippery Rock)

Assistant coach(es)

- Bobby Kennen (Palm Beach Atlantic)
- Bruce Evans (Furman)
- Stephen Perkins (Baylor)

Legend

- (C) Team captain
- (S) Suspended
- (I) Ineligible
- (W) Walk-on
- Injured
- Current redshirt

Roster
Last update: September 22, 2019

== Schedule and results ==
| Date time, TV | Rank^{#} | Opponent^{#} | Result | Record | Site (attendance) city, state |
Non-conference regular season
| November 5, 2019*; 7:00 pm, SECN | | at No. 6 Florida | L 59–74 | 0–1 | O'Connell Center (9,685); Gainesville, FL |
| November 7, 2019*; 7:00 pm, ESPN+ | | Florida National | W 89–81 | 1–1 | UNF Arena (1,748); Jacksonville, FL |
| November 11, 2019*; 7:00 pm, ESPN+ | | Georgia Southern | W 80–77 | 2–1 | UNF Arena (1,659); Jacksonville, FL |
| November 14, 2019*; 7:00 pm, ESPN+ | | Southern Miss | W 66–63 | 3–1 | UNF Arena (2,058); Jacksonville, FL |
| November 18, 2019*; 7:00 pm, ESPN+ | | Trinity Baptist | W 115–39 | 4–1 | UNF Arena (1,328); Jacksonville, FL |
| November 21, 2019*; 7:00 pm, BTN | | at Iowa; Las Vegas Invitational campus site game | L 68–83 | 4–2 | Carver–Hawkeye Arena (9,389); Iowa City, IA |
| November 24, 2019*; 2:00 pm, FS1 | | at Creighton; Las Vegas Invitational campus site game | L 67–76 | 4–3 | CHI Health Center Omaha (16,562); Omaha, NE |
| November 28, 2019*; 7:00 pm | | vs. LIU; Las Vegas Invitational | W 95–92 | 5–3 | Orleans Arena; Paradise, NV |
| November 29, 2019*; 4:30 pm | | vs. Tennessee State; Las Vegas Invitational | L 73–81 | 5–4 | Orleans Arena; Paradise, NV |
| December 2, 2019*; 7:00 pm, ESPN+ | | High Point | W 93–70 | 6–4 | UNF Arena (1,328); Jacksonville, FL |
| December 7, 2019*; 5:00 pm | | at Austin Peay | L 83–90 | 6–5 | Dunn Center (817); Clarksville, TN |
| December 14, 2019*; 5:00 pm | | at Southern Miss | W 72–69 | 7–5 | Reed Green Coliseum (2,380); Hattiesburg, MS |
| December 17, 2019*; 8:30 pm, ACCN | | at No. 19 Florida State | L 81–98 | 7–6 | Donald L. Tucker Center (5,542); Tallahassee, FL |
| December 21, 2019*; 6:00 pm, ESPNU | | at Syracuse | L 70–82 | 7–7 | Carrier Dome (17,537); Syracuse, NY |
| December 30, 2019*; 7:00 pm, ESPN+ | | at No. 20 Dayton | L 59–77 | 7–8 | UD Arena (13,407); Dayton, OH |
Atlantic Sun Conference regular season
| January 2, 2020; 7:00 pm, ESPN+ | | at Kennesaw State | W 76–57 | 8–8 (1–0) | KSU Convocation Center (816); Kennesaw, GA |
| January 4, 2020; 4:30 pm, ESPN+ | | at North Alabama | W 81–65 | 9–8 (2–0) | Flowers Hall (776); Florence, AL |
| January 9, 2020; 7:00 pm, ESPN+ | | Florida Gulf Coast | W 89–74 | 10–8 (3–0) | UNF Arena (2,034); Jacksonville, FL |
| January 11, 2020; 5:00 pm, ESPN+ | | NJIT | L 66–78 | 10–9 (3–1) | UNF Arena (1,919); Jacksonville, FL |
| January 16, 2020; 7:00 pm, ESPN+ | | at Jacksonville | W 75–68 | 11–9 (4–1) | Swisher Gymnasium (1,500); Jacksonville, FL |
| January 23, 2020; 7:00 pm, ESPN+ | | Liberty | W 71–70 | 12–9 (5–1) | UNF Arena (2,371); Jacksonville, FL |
| January 25, 2020; 5:00 pm, ESPN+ | | at Lipscomb | L 73–85 | 12–10 (5–2) | Allen Arena (1,733); Nashville, TN |
| January 30, 2020; 7:00 pm, ESPN+ | | Stetson | W 78–65 | 13–10 (6–2) | UNF Arena (1,611); Jacksonville, FL |
| February 1, 2020; 5:00 pm, ESPN+ | | Kennesaw State | W 86–45 | 14–10 (7–2) | UNF Arena (1,683); Jacksonville, FL |
| February 6, 2020; 7:00 pm, ESPN+ | | at NJIT | W 82–75 | 15–10 (8–2) | Wellness and Events Center (256); Newark, NJ |
| February 8, 2020; 7:30 pm, ESPN+ | | at Florida Gulf Coast | W 69–60 | 16–10 (9–2) | Alico Arena (3,107); Fort Myers, FL |
| February 13, 2020; 7:00 pm, ESPN+ | | Jacksonville | W 81–66 | 17–10 (10–2) | UNF Arena (3,033); Jacksonville, FL |
| February 15, 2020; 3:00 pm, ESPN+ | | North Alabama | W 80–67 | 18–10 (11–2) | UNF Arena (1,548); Jacksonville, FL |
| February 20, 2020; 7:00 pm, ESPN+ | | at Liberty | L 77–82 | 18–11 (11–3) | Vines Center (5,613); Lynchburg, VA |
| February 22, 2020; 5:00 pm, ESPN+ | | Lipscomb | W 82–74 | 19–11 (12–3) | UNF Arena (2,221); Jacksonville, FL |
| February 27, 2020; 7:00 pm, ESPN+ | | at Stetson | W 85–72 | 20–11 (13–3) | Edmunds Center (798); DeLand, FL |
Atlantic Sun tournament
| March 3, 2020; 7:00 pm, ESPN+ | (2) | (7) Jacksonville; Quarterfinals | W 91–88 | 21–11 | UNF Arena (2,797); Jacksonville, FL |
| March 5, 2020; 7:00 pm, ESPN+ | (2) | (3) Lipscomb; Semifinals | L 71–73 | 21–12 | UNF Arena (2,736); Jacksonville, FL |
*Non-conference game. ^{#}Rankings from AP Poll. (#) Tournament seedings in parentheses. All times are in Eastern.
