= 2019–20 NJIT Highlanders men's basketball team =

American college basketball season

2019–20 NJIT Highlanders men's basketball
- Conference: Atlantic Sun Conference
- Record: 9–21 (6–10 ASUN)
- Head coach: Brian Kennedy (4th season)
- Assistant coaches: Jeff Rafferty; Kim Waiters; Joe Gutowski; Danny Manuel
- Home arena: Wellness and Events Center

2019–20 ASUN men's basketball standings
| | Conf. | | | | Overall |
| Team | W | | L | PCT | W | | L | PCT |
|---|---|---|---|---|---|---|---|---|
| Liberty† | 13 | – | 3 | .813 | 30 | – | 4 | .882 |
| North Florida | 13 | – | 3 | .813 | 21 | – | 12 | .636 |
| Lipscomb | 9 | – | 7 | .563 | 16 | – | 16 | .500 |
| Stetson | 9 | – | 7 | .563 | 16 | – | 17 | .485 |
| North Alabama* | 8 | – | 8 | .500 | 13 | – | 17 | .433 |
| Florida Gulf Coast | 7 | – | 9 | .438 | 10 | – | 22 | .313 |
| Jacksonville | 7 | – | 9 | .438 | 14 | – | 18 | .438 |
| NJIT | 6 | – | 10 | .375 | 9 | – | 21 | .300 |
| Kennesaw State | 0 | – | 16 | .000 | 1 | – | 28 | .034 |
† 2020 ASUN tournament winner * Ineligible for the 2020 NCAA tournament due to transition period

The 2019–20 NJIT Highlanders men's basketball team represented the New Jersey Institute of Technology in the 2019–20 NCAA Division I men's basketball season. The Highlanders, led by fourth-year head coach Brian Kennedy, played their home games at the Wellness and Events Center in Newark, New Jersey as members of the Atlantic Sun Conference (ASUN). They finished the season 9–21, 6–10 in ASUN play, to finish in eighth place. They lost in the quarterfinals of the ASUN tournament to Liberty.

This was the final season the Highlanders were a member of the ASUN. On June 14, 2020, it was announced that on they would become a full member of the America East Conference beginning July 1, 2020.

== Previous season ==
The Highlanders finished the 2018–19 season 22–13 overall, 8–8 in ASUN play, to finish in fifth place. In the ASUN tournament, they defeated Florida Gulf Coast in the quarterfinals, before losing to Lipscomb in the semifinals. They received an invitation to the CIT, where they defeated Quinnipiac in the first round, before losing to Hampton in the quarterfinals.

== Roster ==
2019–20 NJIT Highlanders men's basketball team
Players
Coaches

| Pos. | # | Name | Height | Weight | Year | Previous school | Hometown |
|---|---|---|---|---|---|---|---|
| G | 0 | Levar Williams | 6 ft 0 in (1.83 m) | 185 lb (84 kg) | Fr | Burke HS | Hyde Park, MA |
| F | 1 | Taj Price | 6 ft 7 in (2.01 m) | 210 lb (95 kg) | Sr | Newark East Side HS | Newark, NJ |
| F | 2 | San Antonio Brinson | 6 ft 8 in (2.03 m) | 200 lb (91 kg) | Jr | South Kent School | Thomson, GA |
| G | 4 | Zach Cooks | 5 ft 9 in (1.75 m) | 155 lb (70 kg) | Jr | Berkmar HS | Lawrenceville, GA |
| G | 5 | Diego Willis | 6 ft 3 in (1.91 m) | 175 lb (79 kg) | So | Canarias Basketball Academy | Hermosillo, Mexico |
| G | 10 | Caleb Matthews | 6 ft 4 in (1.93 m) | 175 lb (79 kg) | Fr | Mt. Zion Prep | Smyrna, DE |
| G | 11 | Shyquan Gibbs | 6 ft 1 in (1.85 m) | 150 lb (68 kg) | Sr | St. Anthony HS | Hillside, NJ |
| F | 13 | Jason Murphy | 6 ft 8 in (2.03 m) | 232 lb (105 kg) | Fr | St. Frances Academy | Owings Mills, MD |
| G | 14 | Reilly Walsh | 6 ft 3 in (1.91 m) | 180 lb (82 kg) | GS | St. Peter's Boys HS | Staten Island, NY |
| F | 21 | Souleymane Diakite | 6 ft 9 in (2.06 m) | 210 lb (95 kg) | So | Saint Benedict's Prep | Bamako, Mali |
| G | 22 | Byron III Breland | 6 ft 3 in (1.91 m) | 180 lb (82 kg) | Fr | Hamden Hall Country Day School | New Haven, CT |
| F | 32 | Xavier Mayo | 6 ft 7 in (2.01 m) | 230 lb (104 kg) | Fr | The Hill School | Beacon, NY |
| F | 33 | Kjell de Graaf | 6 ft 10 in (2.08 m) | 210 lb (95 kg) | So | Canarias Basketball Academy | Rotterdam, Netherlands |
| F | 35 | Da'mir Faison | 6 ft 7 in (2.01 m) | 200 lb (91 kg) | Fr | Hazleton Area HS | Philadelphia, PA |

Head coach

- Brian Kennedy (Monmouth)

Assistant coach(es)

- Jeff Rafferty (Springfield)
- Kim Waiters (Robert Morris)
- Joe Gutowski (Roanoke)

Legend

- (C) Team captain
- (S) Suspended
- (I) Ineligible
- (W) Walk-on
- Injured
- Current redshirt

Roster
Last update: January 23, 2020

== Schedule and results ==
| Date time, TV | Rank^{#} | Opponent^{#} | Result | Record | Site (attendance) city, state |
Non-conference regular season
| November 6, 2019*; 7:00 p.m. | | at Colgate | L 75–80 | 0–1 | Cotterell Court (871); Hamilton, NY |
| November 9, 2019*; 4:30 p.m., FSN | | at Providence | L 47–76 | 0–2 | Dunkin' Donuts Center (7,102); Providence, RI |
| November 13, 2019*; 7:00 p.m., ESPN+ | | at Cornell | W 59–58 | 1–2 | Newman Arena (274); Ithaca, NY |
| November 16, 2019*; 2:00 p.m., ESPN+ | | Wagner | W 88–69 | 2–2 | Wellness and Events Center (1,255); Newark, NJ |
| November 20, 2019*; 7:00 p.m., ESPN+ | | Binghamton | L 75–77 | 2–3 | Wellness and Events Center (504); Newark, NJ |
| November 23, 2019*; 4:30 p.m., ESPN+ | | at Brown | L 63–79 | 2–4 | Pizzitola Sports Center (555); Providence, RI |
| November 26, 2019*; 7:00 p.m., BTN | | at Rutgers | L 58–85 | 2–5 | Louis Brown Athletic Center (4,509); Piscataway, NJ |
| December 4, 2019*; 7:00 p.m. | | at Army | L 65–75 | 2–6 | Christl Arena (658); West Point, NY |
| December 7, 2019*; 12:00 p.m., ESPN3 | | at UCF | L 65–78 | 2–7 | Addition Financial Arena (4,178); Orlando, FL |
| December 11, 2019*; 7:00 p.m., ESPN+ | | UMass Lowell | L 66–72 | 2–8 | Wellness and Events Center (355); Newark, NJ |
| December 14, 2019*; 2:00 p.m. | | at St. Francis Brooklyn | L 71–73 | 2–9 | Generoso Pope Athletic Complex (418); Brooklyn, NY |
| December 22, 2019*; 2:00 p.m., ESPN+ | | Kean | W 74–46 | 3–9 | Wellness and Events Center (350); Newark, NJ |
| December 29, 2019*; 1:00 p.m., ESPN3 | | at UConn | L 47–69 | 3–10 | XL Center (10,507); Hartford, CT |
Atlantic Sun Conference regular season
| January 4, 2020; 4:00 p.m., ESPN+ | | Liberty | L 38–65 | 3–11 (0–1) | Wellness and Events Center (1,004); Newark, NJ |
| January 9, 2020; 7:00 p.m., ESPN+ | | at Jacksonville | L 52–68 | 3–12 (0–2) | Swisher Gymnasium (847); Jacksonville, FL |
| January 11, 2020; 5:00 p.m., ESPN+ | | at North Florida | W 78–66 | 4–12 (1–2) | UNF Arena (1,919); Jacksonville, FL |
| January 16, 2020; 7:00 p.m., ESPN+ | | Lipscomb | W 75–57 | 5–12 (2–2) | Wellness and Events Center (2,016); Newark, NJ |
| January 18, 2020; 4:00 p.m., ESPN+ | | Kennesaw State | W 66–48 | 6–12 (3–2) | Wellness and Events Center (255); Newark, NJ |
| January 23, 2020; 7:00 p.m., ESPN+ | | at Stetson | L 64–65 | 6–13 (3–3) | Edmunds Center (680); DeLand, FL |
| January 25, 2020; 7:00 p.m., ESPN+ | | at Florida Gulf Coast | W 56–54 | 7–13 (4–3) | Alico Arena (2,843); Fort Myers, FL |
| January 30, 2020; 7:00 p.m., ESPN+ | | North Alabama | L 74–78 | 7–14 (4–4) | Wellness and Events Center (328); Newark, NJ |
| February 6, 2020; 7:00 p.m., ESPN+ | | North Florida | L 75–82 | 7–15 (4–5) | Wellness and Events Center (256); Newark, NJ |
| February 8, 2020; 4:00 p.m., ESPN+ | | Jacksonville | L 54–65 | 7–16 (4–6) | Wellness and Events Center (607); Newark, NJ |
| February 13, 2020; 7:30 p.m., ESPN+ | | at Lipscomb | L 63–77 | 7–17 (4–7) | Allen Arena (1,485); Nashville, TN |
| February 15, 2020; 7:00 p.m., ESPN+ | | at Liberty | L 49–62 | 7–18 (4–8) | Vines Center (4,745); Lynchburg, VA |
| February 20, 2020; 7:00 p.m., ESPN+ | | Stetson | W 78–69 | 8–18 (5–8) | Wellness and Events Center (569); Newark, NJ |
| February 22, 2020; 4:00 p.m., ESPN+ | | Florida Gulf Coast | L 39–55 | 8–19 (5–9) | Wellness and Events Center (735); Newark, NJ |
| February 27, 2020; 8:00 p.m., ESPN+ | | at North Alabama | L 65–72 | 8–20 (5–10) | Flowers Hall (812); Florence, AL |
| February 29, 2020; 4:30 p.m., ESPN+ | | at Kennesaw State | W 76–55 | 9–20 (6–10) | KSU Convocation Center (1,006); Kennesaw, GA |
Atlantic Sun tournament
| March 3, 2020; 7:00 p.m., ESPN+ | (8) | at (1) Liberty; Quarterfinals | L 49–55 | 9–21 | Vines Center (3,042); Lynchburg, VA |
*Non-conference game. ^{#}Rankings from AP poll. (#) Tournament seedings in parentheses. All times are in Eastern.
