= 2019–20 Jacksonville Dolphins men's basketball team =

American college basketball season

2019–20 Jacksonville Dolphins men's basketball
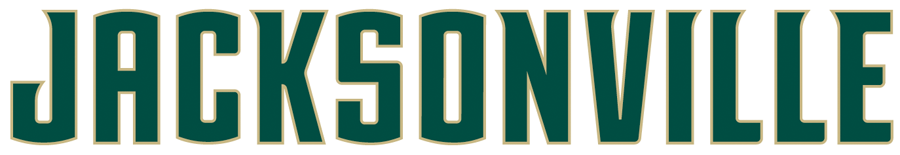
- Conference: Atlantic Sun Conference
- Record: 14–18 (7–9 ASUN)
- Head coach: Tony Jasick (6th season)
- Assistant coaches: Dan Bere'; Chad Eshbaugh; Vince Martin
- Home arena: Swisher Gymnasium

2019–20 ASUN men's basketball standings
	Conf.				Overall
Team	W		L	PCT	W		L	PCT
Liberty†	13	–	3	.813	30	–	4	.882
North Florida	13	–	3	.813	21	–	12	.636
Lipscomb	9	–	7	.563	16	–	16	.500
Stetson	9	–	7	.563	16	–	17	.485
North Alabama*	8	–	8	.500	13	–	17	.433
Florida Gulf Coast	7	–	9	.438	10	–	22	.313
Jacksonville	7	–	9	.438	14	–	18	.438
NJIT	6	–	10	.375	9	–	21	.300
Kennesaw State	0	–	16	.000	1	–	28	.034
† 2020 ASUN tournament winner * Ineligible for the 2020 NCAA tournament due to transition period

The 2019–20 Jacksonville Dolphins men's basketball team represented Jacksonville University in the 2019–20 NCAA Division I men's basketball season. The Dolphins, led by sixth-year head coach Tony Jasick, played their home games at Swisher Gymnasium on the university's Jacksonville, Florida campus as members of the Atlantic Sun Conference. They finished the season 14–18, 7–9 in ASUN play to finish in a tie for sixth place. They lost in the quarterfinals of the ASUN tournament to North Florida.

== Previous season ==
The Dolphins finished the 2018–19 season 12–20, 5–11 in conference play to finish in seventh place. In the ASUN tournament, they were defeated by Liberty in the quarterfinals.

== Roster ==
2019–20 Jacksonville Dolphins men's basketball team
Players
Coaches

Pos.	#	Name	Height	Weight	Year	Previous school	Hometown
F	0	Kevin Norman	6 ft 4 in (1.93 m)	200 lb (91 kg)	Jr	Angelina College	Alexandria, LA
G	1	Tyreese Davis	6 ft 6 in (1.98 m)	210 lb (95 kg)	So	Link Prep	Kansas City, MO
G	2	Corey Romich	6 ft 4 in (1.93 m)	205 lb (93 kg)	Jr	Vermont Academy	Groton, MA
C	3	David Bell	6 ft 10 in (2.08 m)	225 lb (102 kg)	RS Sr	Ohio State	Cleveland, OH
G	5	DeAnthony McCallum	6 ft 4 in (1.93 m)	180 lb (82 kg)	Sr	Independence CC	Cincinnati, OH
G	10	Aamahne Santos	5 ft 10 in (1.78 m)	165 lb (75 kg)	RS Sr	Cloud County CC	Dorchester, MA
G	11	Trey Sides	6 ft 1 in (1.85 m)	170 lb (77 kg)	Fr	Phillipsburg HS	Phillipsburg, KS
G	12	Kevion Nolan	6 ft 6 in (1.98 m)	170 lb (77 kg)	Jr	Samford	Anniston, AL
F	13	Bryce Workman	6 ft 7 in (2.01 m)	230 lb (104 kg)	So	Sickles HS	Tampa, FL
G	14	Mo Arnold	6 ft 2 in (1.88 m)	180 lb (82 kg)	Fr	Picayune Memorial HS	Picayune, MS
F	15	Donovan Forte	6 ft 7 in (2.01 m)	220 lb (100 kg)	So	Garfield Heights HS	Cleveland, OH
G/F	21	Derrick Flowers	6 ft 4 in (1.93 m)	200 lb (91 kg)	Jr	Prestonwood Christian Academy	Frisco, TX
G	22	Diante Wood	6 ft 4 in (1.93 m)	210 lb (95 kg)	Fr	Alabama	Anniston, AL
G/F	23	Destin Barnes	6 ft 7 in (2.01 m)	215 lb (98 kg)	Jr	Florida Southwestern	Chicago, IL
G	34	Thomas Owen	6 ft 4 in (1.93 m)	185 lb (84 kg)	So	St. Francis HS	Dunwoody, GA

Head coach

- Tony Jasick (Mars Hill College)

Assistant coach(es)

- Dan Bere' (Indiana)
- Chad Eshbaugh (Washburn)
- Vince Martin (Jacksonville)

Legend

- (C) Team captain
- (S) Suspended
- (I) Ineligible
- (W) Walk-on
- Injured
- Current redshirt

Roster
Last update: September 19, 2019

== Schedule and results ==
Date time, TV	Rank^{#}	Opponent^{#}	Result	Record	Site (attendance) city, state
Non-conference regular season
November 5, 2019*; 7:00 pm, FS2		at No. 19 Xavier	L 57–76	0–1	Cintas Center (10,050); Cincinnati, OH
November 8, 2019*; 6:00 pm		Johnson University (FL)	W 83–65	1–1	Swisher Gymnasium (878); Jacksonville, FL
November 11, 2019*; 6:00 pm		vs. Bowling Green	W 75–59	1–2	Watsco Center (316); Coral Gables, FL
November 15, 2019*; 7:00 pm		at UMass Lowell; River Hawk Invitational	W 80–78	2–2	Costello Athletic Center (1,166); Lowell, MA
November 16, 2019*; 1:30 pm		vs. Dartmouth; River Hawk Invitational	W 57–37	3–2	Costello Athletic Center (696); Lowell, MA
November 17, 2019*; 1:00 pm		vs. Merrimack; River Hawk Invitational	L 44–54	3–3	Costello Athletic Center (534); Lowell, MA
November 21, 2019*; 7:00 pm		Western Carolina	L 94–96 ^{2OT}	3–4	Swisher Gymnasium (764); Jacksonville, FL
November 25, 2019*; 7:30 pm, ESPN+		at Campbell	L 57–62	3–5	Gore Arena (1,487); Buies Creek, NC
November 30, 2019*; 2:00 pm		at North Carolina A&T	W 61–45	4–5	Corbett Sports Center (956); Greensboro, NC
December 4, 2019*; 6:00 pm, FS2		at Marquette	W 75–55	4–6	Fiserv Forum (12,852); Milwaukee, WI
December 7, 2019*; 6:00 pm		Bethune–Cookman	W 82–60	5–6	Swisher Gymnasium (811); Jacksonville, FL
December 14, 2019*; 2:00 pm		Middle Georgia	W 93–79	6–6	Swisher Gymnasium (655); Jacksonville, FL
December 18, 2019*; 6:00 pm		at Presbyterian	L 58–81	7–6	Templeton Physical Education Center (127); Clinton, SC
December 20, 2019*; 7:00 pm, ACCN		at Clemson	W 68–39	7–7	Littlejohn Coliseum (5,632); Clemson, SC
December 30, 2019*; 7:00 pm, ESPN+		South Carolina State	L 52–58	7–8	Swisher Gymnasium (657); Jacksonville, FL
Atlantic Sun Conference regular season
January 2, 2020; 7:00 pm, ESPN+		at North Alabama	L 57–62	7–9 (0–1)	Flowers Hall (434); Florence, AL
January 9, 2020; 7:00 pm, ESPN+		NJIT	W 68–52	8–9 (1–1)	Swisher Gymnasium (847); Jacksonville, FL
January 11, 2020; 7:00 pm, ESPN+		at Liberty	L 37–54	8–10 (1–2)	Vines Center (4,299); Lynchburg, VA
January 16, 2020; 7:00 pm, ESPN+		North Florida	L 68–75	8–11 (1–3)	Swisher Gymnasium (1,500); Jacksonville, FL
January 18, 2020; 6:00 pm, ESPN+		Stetson	L 59–64	8–12 (1–4)	Swisher Gymnasium (767); Jacksonville, FL
January 23, 2020; 7:00 pm, ESPN+		at Lipscomb	W 89–85 ^{OT}	9–12 (2–4)	Allen Arena (1,261); Nashville, TN
January 25, 2020; 7:00 pm, ESPN+		at Kennesaw State	W 83–64	10–12 (3–4)	KSU Convocation Center (1,973); Kennesaw, GA
January 30, 2020; 7:00 pm, ESPN+		Florida Gulf Coast	L 61–63	10–13 (3–5)	Swisher Gymnasium (903); Jacksonville, FL
February 1, 2020; 6:00 pm, ESPN+		North Alabama	W 85–83	11–13 (4–5)	Swisher Gymnasium (602); Jacksonville, FL
February 6, 2020; 7:00 pm, ESPN+		Liberty	L 62–71	11–14 (4–6)	Swisher Gymnasium (816); Jacksonville, FL
February 8, 2020; 4:30 pm, ESPN+		at NJIT	W 65–54	12–14 (5–6)	Wellness and Events Center (607); Newark, NJ
February 13, 2020; 7:00 pm, ESPN+		at North Florida	L 66–81	12–15 (5–7)	UNF Arena (3,033); Jacksonville, FL
February 20, 2020; 7:00 pm, ESPN+		Lipscomb	L 67–68	12–16 (5–8)	Swisher Gymnasium (1,069); Jacksonville, FL
February 22, 2020; 6:00 pm, ESPN+		Kennesaw State	W 69–55	13–16 (6–8)	Swisher Gymnasium (734); Jacksonville, FL
February 27, 2020; 7:00 pm, ESPN+		at Florida Gulf Coast	L 67–73	13–17 (6–9)	Alico Arena (2,758); Fort Myers, FL
February 29, 2020; 4:00 pm, ESPN+		at Stetson	W 53–52	14–17 (7–9)	Edmunds Center (769); DeLand, FL
Atlantic Sun tournament
March 3, 2020; 7:00 pm, ESPN+	(7)	at (2) North Florida; Quarterfinals	L 88–91	14–18	UNF Arena (2,797); Jacksonville, FL
*Non-conference game. ^{#}Rankings from AP Poll. (#) Tournament seedings in parentheses. All times are in Eastern.
