= Zach Cooks =

American basketball player (born 1999)

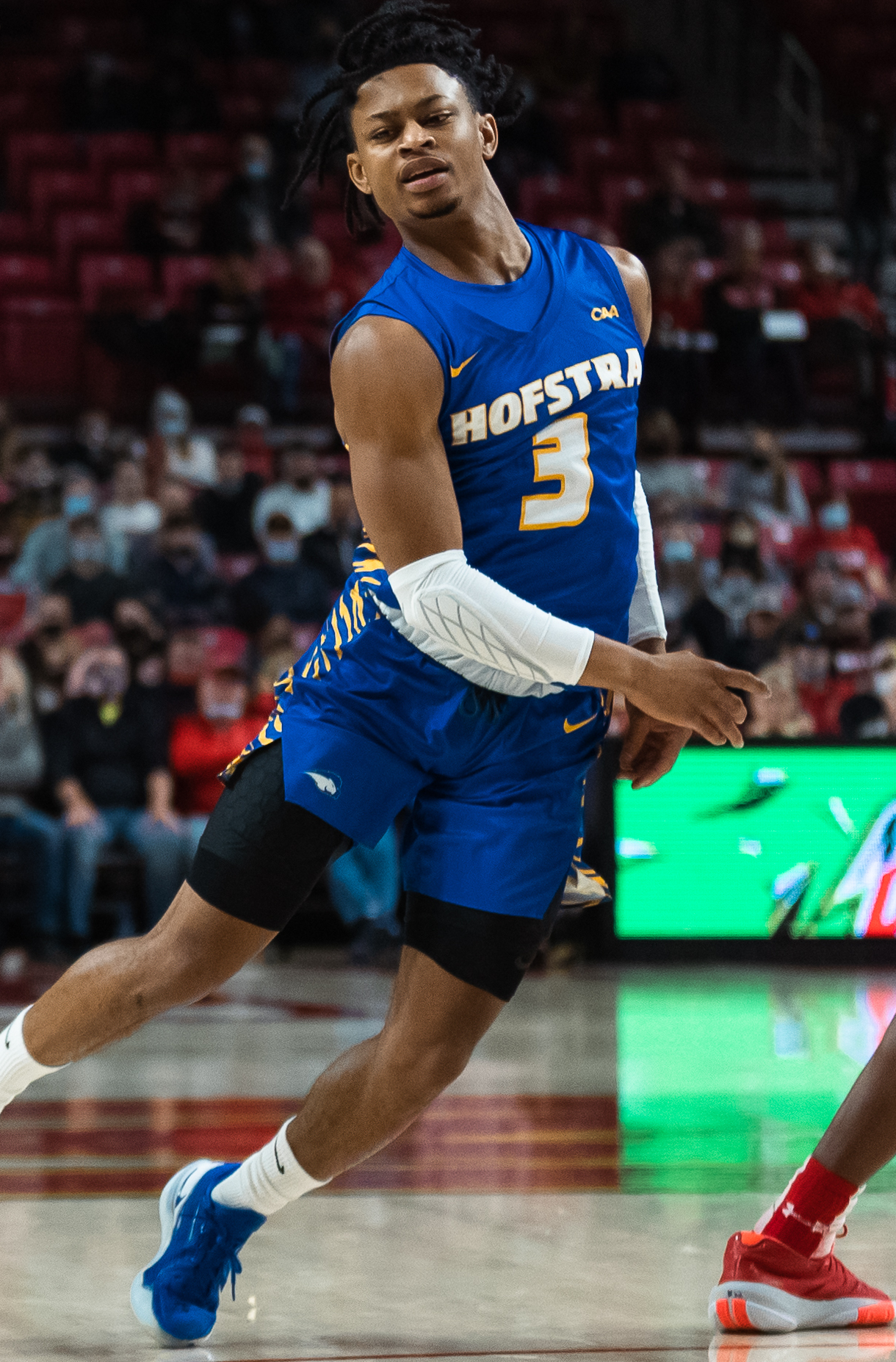

No. 3 – Gießen 46ers
- Position: Point guard
- League: ProA

Personal information
- Born: March 4, 1999 (age 27) Lawrenceville, Georgia, U.S.
- Listed height: 5 ft 11 in (1.80 m)
- Listed weight: 170 lb (77 kg)

Career information
- High school: Norcross (Norcross, Georgia); Berkmar (Lilburn, Georgia)
- College: NJIT (2017–2021); Hofstra (2021–2022)
- NBA draft: 2022: undrafted
- Playing career: 2022–present

Career history
- 2022–2024: UBSC Graz
- 2024–2025: Science City Jena
- 2025–2026: Telekom Baskets Bonn
- 2026–present: Giessen 46ers

Career highlights
- CAA Sixth Man of the Year (2022); 2× Second-team All-ASUN (2019, 2020); Third-team All-America East (2021)

Zachery Deshon Cooks (born March 4, 1999) is an American professional basketball player for the Giessen 46ers of the German ProA. He played college basketball for the NJIT Highlanders and Hofstra Pride.

== High school career ==
Cooks began his high school career at Norcross High School. For his junior season, he transferred to Berkmar High School and led the team to the Georgia Sweet 16. Cooks averaged 11.4 points and 2.5 assists per game as a junior. He committed to playing college basketball for NJIT.

== College career ==
Cooks averaged 8.5 points, 2.2 rebounds and 2.1 assists per game as a freshman. As a sophomore, he averaged 17.6 points, 4.8 rebounds and 2.1 assists per game, earning Second Team All-ASUN honors. On November 20, 2019, he scored a school-record 35 points in a 77–75 loss to Binghamton. Cooks averaged 19.7 points, 5.2 rebounds and 2.2 assists per game as a junior and repeated on the Second Team All-ASUN. He declared for the 2020 NBA draft after the season, but ultimately returned to NJIT. As a senior, Cooks averaged 17.1 points, 4.9 rebounds, and 1.5 assists per game. He was named to the Third Team All-America East. Following the season, Cooks took advantage of the additional season of eligibility granted by the NCAA and transferred to Hofstra. On January 22, 2022, he scored 19 points and passed the 2,000 career point mark in a 72–50 win over Northeastern. Cooks was named Colonial Athletic Association Sixth Man of the Year.

== Professional career ==
Following his collegiate career, he signed his first contract as a professional basketball player with UBSC Graz of the Austrian Basketball Superliga in September 2022. In the 2022-23 regular season, he emerged as the league's leading scorer (23.2 points per game).

On August 2, 2024, he signed with Science City Jena of the German ProA.

On June 3, 2025, he signed with Telekom Baskets Bonn of the Basketball Bundesliga. He parted ways with the team on Juene 20, 2026.

== Career statistics ==
Legend
GP	Games played	GS	Games started	MPG	Minutes per game
FG%	Field goal percentage	3P%	3-point field goal percentage	FT%	Free throw percentage
RPG	Rebounds per game	APG	Assists per game	SPG	Steals per game
BPG	Blocks per game	PPG	Points per game	**Bold**	Career high

=== College ===
Year	Team	GP	GS	MPG	FG%	3P%	FT%	RPG	APG	SPG	BPG	PPG
2017–18	NJIT	30	1	22.1	**.455**	**.432**	.732	2.2	2.1	1.6	**.2**	8.5
2018–19	NJIT	**35**	**35**	37.3	.451	.349	.732	4.8	2.1	**2.5**	.1	17.6
2019–20	NJIT	30	30	37.6	.405	.305	**.778**	**5.2**	**2.2**	1.8	.1	**19.7**
2020–21	NJIT	19	19	**37.7**	.411	.337	.718	4.9	1.5	2.2	.1	17.1
Career		114	85	33.4	.428	.347	.746	4.2	2.0	2.0	.1	15.7
