= 2020–21 British Basketball League season =

2020–21 BBL season
- League: British Basketball League
- Season: 2020–21
- Dates: 31 October 2020 – 30 April 2021; 3–16 May 2021 (playoffs)
- Games played: 165 (regular season); 13 (playoffs)
- Teams: 11
- TV partners: Great Britain: Sky Sports; BBC Sport; Online: BBL TV; YouTube

Regular season
- League champions: Leicester Riders (5th title)
- BBL Cup: Newcastle Eagles (6th title)
- BBL Trophy: London Lions (1st title)
- Season MVP: (United States) Geno Crandall (Riders)

Playoffs
- Champions: Newcastle Eagles (7th title)
- Runners-up: London Lions
- Finals MVP: (United States) Cortez Edwards (Eagles)

Statistical leaders
Points	(United States) Rahmon Fletcher (Eagles)	19.2
Rebounds	(United Kingdom) David Ulph (Giants)	9.2
Assists	(United States) Rahmon Fletcher (Eagles)	9.3
Efficiency	(United Kingdom) David Ulph (Giants)	65%

Records
- Highest scoring: 225 points Riders 116–109 Giants (5 February 2021)
- Winning streak: 12 games London Lions (31 March – 30 April 2021)
- Losing streak: 10 games Glasgow Rocks (28 March – 25 April 2021)

BBL seasons
- ← 2019–20 2021–22 →
- All statistics correct as of 30 April 2021.

The 2020–21 BBL season was the 34th season of the British Basketball League, the top British professional basketball league, since its establishment in 1987. The season featured 11 teams from across England and Scotland.

== Teams ==
Locations of the 2020–21 BBL teams

=== Arenas and locations ===
Team	Location	Arena	Capacity
Bristol Flyers	Bristol	SGS WISE Arena	750
Cheshire Phoenix	Ellesmere Port	Cheshire Oaks Arena	1,400
Glasgow Rocks	Glasgow	Emirates Arena	6,500
Leicester Riders	Leicester	Morningside Arena	2,400
London Lions	London	Copper Box	6,000
Manchester Giants	Manchester	National Basketball Centre	2,000
Newcastle Eagles	Newcastle upon Tyne	Eagles Community Arena	3,000
Plymouth Raiders	Plymouth	Plymouth Pavilions	1,500
Sheffield Sharks	Sheffield	Ponds Forge	1,000
Surrey Scorchers	Guildford	Surrey Sports Park	1,000
Worcester Wolves	Worcester	University of Worcester Arena	2,000

=== Personnel and sponsorship ===
Team	Head coach	Captain	Main jersey sponsor
Bristol Flyers	(Greece) Andreas Kapoulas	(England) Daniel Edozie	XLedger
Cheshire Phoenix	(England) Ben Thomas	(United States) Jalen Hayes	Hillyer McKeown
Glasgow Rocks	(Scotland) Gareth Murray	(Scotland) Jonny Bunyan	Carling
Leicester Riders	(United States) Rob Paternostro	(United States) Darien Nelson-Henry	Jelson Homes
London Lions	(England) Vince Macaulay	(England) Joe Ikhinmwin	
Manchester Giants	(England) Lloyd Gardner	(England) Jack Hudson	
Newcastle Eagles	(England) Ian MacLeod	(United States) Rahmon Fletcher	GiveToLocal
Plymouth Raiders	(England) Paul James	(England) Ashley Hamilton	MLA College
Sheffield Sharks	(United States) Atiba Lyons	(Canada) Mike Tuck	B.Braun
Surrey Scorchers	(Zimbabwe) Creon Raftopoulos	(England) Tayo Ogedengbe	Gidden Place
Worcester Wolves	(England) Matthew Newby	(Netherlands) Maarten Bouwknecht	University of Worcester

=== Coaching changes ===
Team	Outgoing coach	Manner of departure	Date of vacancy	Position in table	Incoming coach	Date of appointment
Glasgow Rocks	(France) Vincent Lavandier	Mutual consent	1 July 2020	Pre-season	(Scotland) Gareth Murray	16 July 2020
Manchester Giants	(England) Danny Byrne	Left	2 March 2021	9th (6-11)	(England) Lloyd Gardner	15 March 2021

== BBL Cup ==
=== Qualification stage ===
Group 1

Pos	Team	Pld	W	L	PF	PA	PD	Pts	Qualification
1	Plymouth Raiders	6	5	1	471	384	+87	10	Quarter-finals
2	Surrey Scorchers	6	3	3	336	340	−4	6	Quarter-finals
3	Bristol Flyers	6	2	4	269	309	−40	4	Quarter-finals
4	Worcester Wolves	6	2	4	410	453	−43	4	

Updated to match(es) played on 2 December 2020. Source: BBC Sport

31 October 2020	Surrey Scorchers	20–0	Bristol Flyers	Surrey Sports Park, Guildford
19:00
N/A		boxscore report		Attendance: N/A

7 November 2020	Bristol Flyers	0–20	Surrey Scorchers	SGS College Arena, Bristol
19:30
N/A		boxscore report		Attendance: N/A

13 November 2020	Bristol Flyers	54–69	Plymouth Raiders	SGS College Arena, Bristol
19:30	Scoring by quarter: 19–15, 11–16, 12–22, 12–16
YouTube		boxscore report		Attendance: 0 (Note: Match played behind closed doors due to the COVID-19 pandemic in the United Kingdom.)

14 November 2020	Worcester Wolves	86–85	Surrey Scorchers	Worcester Arena, Worcester
19:00	Scoring by quarter: 29–18, 16–21, 21–22, 20–24
YouTube		boxscore report		Attendance: 0

15 November 2020	Plymouth Raiders	96–60	Worcester Wolves	Plymouth Pavilions, Plymouth
15:00	Scoring by quarter: 16–9, 25–17, 26–19, 29–15
YouTube		boxscore report		Attendance: 0

18 November 2020	Plymouth Raiders	65–78	Bristol Flyers	Plymouth Pavilions, Plymouth
19:30	Scoring by quarter: 14–21, 17–13, 18–20, 16–24
YouTube		boxscore report		Attendance: 0

20 November 2020	Surrey Scorchers	73–84	Plymouth Raiders	Surrey Sports Park, Guildford
18:00	Scoring by quarter: 21–13, 15–29, 21–20, 16–22
YouTube		boxscore report		Attendance: 0

21 November 2020	Bristol Flyers	64–68	Worcester Wolves	SGS College Arena, Bristol
18:30	Scoring by quarter: 28–17, 4–20, 22–9, 10–23
YouTube		boxscore report		Attendance: 0

22 November 2020	Plymouth Raiders	98–62	Surrey Scorchers	Plymouth Pavilions, Plymouth
15:00	Scoring by quarter: 17–15, 24–13, 33–13, 24–21
YouTube		boxscore report		Attendance: 0

27 November 2020	Worcester Wolves	57–59	Plymouth Raiders	Worcester Arena, Worcester
19:00	Scoring by quarter: 16–15, 21–17, 12–14, 8–13
YouTube		boxscore report		Attendance: 0

28 November 2020	Surrey Scorchers	76–72	Worcester Wolves	Surrey Sports Park, Guildford
18:00	Scoring by quarter: 15–17, 13–17, 17–16, 31–22
YouTube		boxscore report		Attendance: 0

2 December 2020	Worcester Wolves	66–73	Bristol Flyers	Worcester Arena, Worcester
19:00	Scoring by quarter: 15–25, 13–13, 12–17, 26–18
YouTube		boxscore report		Attendance: 0

Group 2

Pos	Team	Pld	W	L	PF	PA	PD	Pts	Qualification
1	Manchester Giants	4	3	1	372	297	+75	6	Quarter-finals
2	Glasgow Rocks	4	3	1	320	304	+16	6	Quarter-finals
3	Cheshire Phoenix	4	0	4	292	383	−91	0	

Updated to match(es) played on 29 November 2020. Source: BBC Sport

8 November 2020	Cheshire Phoenix	92–98	Manchester Giants	Cheshire Oaks Arena, Ellesmere Port
17:00	Scoring by quarter: 21–26, 21–23, 17–27, 33–22
YouTube		boxscore report		Attendance: 0

15 November 2020	Glasgow Rocks	93–63	Cheshire Phoenix	Emirates Arena, Glasgow
17:00	Scoring by quarter: 21–12, 22–20, 25–17, 25–14
YouTube		boxscore report		Attendance: 0

19 November 2020	Manchester Giants	106–64	Cheshire Phoenix	National Basketball Centre, Manchester
19:00	Scoring by quarter: 33–9, 24–14, 18–28, 31–13
YouTube		boxscore report		Attendance: 0

22 November 2020	Cheshire Phoenix	73–86	Glasgow Rocks	Cheshire Oaks Arena, Ellesmere Port
17:00	Scoring by quarter: 15–25, 17–14, 26–26, 15–21
YouTube		boxscore report		Attendance: 0

27 November 2020	Manchester Giants	95–58	Glasgow Rocks	National Basketball Centre, Manchester
19:30	Scoring by quarter: 25–16, 25–15, 27–13, 18–14
YouTube		boxscore report		Attendance: 0

29 November 2020	Glasgow Rocks	83–73	Manchester Giants	Emirates Arena, Glasgow
17:00	Scoring by quarter: 30–21, 16–13, 22–23, 15–16
YouTube		boxscore report		Attendance: 0

Group 3

Pos	Team	Pld	W	L	PF	PA	PD	Pts	Qualification
1	Newcastle Eagles	6	4	2	539	526	+13	8	Quarter-finals
2	Leicester Riders	6	3	3	516	509	+7	6	Quarter-finals
3	London Lions	6	3	3	501	497	+4	6	Quarter-finals
4	Sheffield Sharks	6	2	4	458	482	−24	4	

Updated to match(es) played on 7 December 2020. Source: BBC Sport

1 November 2020	London Lions	79–89(OT)	Newcastle Eagles	Copper Box Arena, London
14:30	Scoring by quarter: 17–19, 19–19, 19–16, 22–23, Overtime: 2–12
YouTube		boxscore report		Attendance: 0

6 November 2020	Sheffield Sharks	70–61	London Lions	Ponds Forge, Sheffield
18:00	Scoring by quarter: 18–19, 16–20, 11–7, 25–15
YouTube		boxscore report		Attendance: 0

8 November 2020	Leicester Riders	96–102	Newcastle Eagles	Morningside Arena, Leicester
17:00	Scoring by quarter: 30–29, 27–28, 21–20, 18–25
YouTube		boxscore report		Attendance: 0

13 November 2020	London Lions	88–73	Sheffield Sharks	Copper Box Arena, London
17:00	Scoring by quarter: 29–18, 26–18, 17–27, 16–10
YouTube		boxscore report		Attendance: 0

13 November 2020	Newcastle Eagles	82–88	Leicester Riders	Eagles Community Arena, Newcastle
19:30	Scoring by quarter: 20–20, 18–23, 24–18, 20–27
YouTube		boxscore report		Attendance: 0

15 November 2020	Leicester Riders	97–76	London Lions	Morningside Arena, Leicester
17:00	Scoring by quarter: 26–11, 27–20, 22–18, 22–27
YouTube		boxscore report		Attendance: 0

17 November 2020	Newcastle Eagles	97–87	Sheffield Sharks	Eagles Community Arena, Newcastle
19:00	Scoring by quarter: 24–15, 23–14, 28–26, 22–32
YouTube		boxscore report		Attendance: 0

20 November 2020	Sheffield Sharks	64–85	Leicester Riders	Ponds Forge, Sheffield
18:00	Scoring by quarter: 17–24, 14–21, 12–19, 21–21
YouTube		boxscore report		Attendance: 0

20 November 2020	Newcastle Eagles	79–99	London Lions	Eagles Community Arena, Newcastle
19:30	Scoring by quarter: 23–27, 24–20, 14–22, 18–30
YouTube		boxscore report		Attendance: 0

22 November 2020	London Lions	98–89	Leicester Riders	Copper Box Arena, London
14:30	Scoring by quarter: 25–12, 20–28, 32–27, 21–22
YouTube		boxscore report		Attendance: 0

29 November 2020	Sheffield Sharks	77–90	Newcastle Eagles	Ponds Forge, Sheffield
15:00	Scoring by quarter: 26–20, 12–23, 20–23, 19–24
YouTube		boxscore report		Attendance: 0

7 December 2020	Leicester Riders	61–87	Sheffield Sharks	Morningside Arena, Leicester
20:00	Scoring by quarter: 14–24, 17–24, 21–19, 9–20
BBL TV		boxscore report		Attendance: 0

=== Quarter-finals ===
16 December 2020	Plymouth Raiders	80–85(OT)	London Lions	Plymouth Pavilions, Plymouth
19:00	Scoring by quarter: 16–22, 16–11, 26–27, 18–16, Overtime: 4–9
BBL TV	Pts: Hamilton 27; Rebs: Hamilton, Ibeh 7 Asts: Dusha, Sentance 3	boxscore report	Pts: Williams 20; Rebs: Parker 8 Asts: Liggins, Robinson 6	Attendance: 0

16 December 2020	Manchester Giants	87–84	Surrey Scorchers	National Basketball Centre, Manchester
19:30	Scoring by quarter: 16–29, 27–18, 24–11, 20–26
BBL TV	Pts: Hexom 22; Rebs: Hexom 16; Asts: Zak Powell 7	boxscore report	Pts: McLemore 21; Rebs: Cashaw, White 8 Asts: Cashaw 8	Attendance: 0

16 December 2020	Newcastle Eagles	72–64	Bristol Flyers	Eagles Community Arena, Newcastle
19:30	Scoring by quarter: 17–16, 22–11, 17–12, 16–25
BBL TV	Pts: Maxwell 22; Rebs: Edwards 11; Asts: Edwards 8	boxscore report	Pts: Copeland 14; Rebs: Edozie 12; Asts: Edozie 6	Attendance: 0

16 December 2020	Leicester Riders	93–59	Glasgow Rocks	Morningside Arena, Leicester
20:00	Scoring by quarter: 20–10, 31–16, 25–15, 17–18
BBL TV	Pts: Johnson 20; Rebs: Falzon, Johnson 7 Asts: Washington 11	boxscore report	Pts: Jacdonmi 17; Rebs: Jacdonmi 9 Asts: Mpondo 6	Attendance: 44

=== Semi-finals ===
12 January 2021	Leicester Riders	71–76	Newcastle Eagles	Morningside Arena, Leicester
17:00	Scoring by quarter: 14–14, 22–23, 24–25, 11–14
BBL TV	Pts: Crandall 17; Rebs: Lee 12; Asts: Crandall 5	boxscore report	Pts: Maxwell 19; Rebs: Edwards 9 Asts: Fletcher 7	Attendance: 44

12 January 2021	London Lions	20–0	Manchester Giants	National Basketball Centre, Manchester
20:00
BBL TV		boxscore		Attendance: N/A

- Notes
1. A Due to a number of players having to self-isolate due to COVID-19, Manchester Giants were unable to fulfil the fixture against London Lions. London Lions were given an automatic bye to the final.

=== Final ===
24 January 2021	London Lions	77–84	Newcastle Eagles	Morningside Arena, Leicester
15:30	Scoring by quarter: 18–21, 17–25, 22–16, 20–22
Sky Sports	Pts: Williams 19; Rebs: Ware 9 Asts: Robinson 6	boxscore report	Pts: Fletcher 21; Rebs: Gordon 15; Asts: Fletcher 8	Attendance: 15

== BBL Championship ==
The BBL Championship returned to the three-game series format used prior to the 2019–20 season, for a 30-game regular season. There were 21 Rounds between 3 December 2020 and 30 April 2021.

=== Standings ===
Pos	Team	Pld	W	L	PF	PA	PD	Pts	Qualification
1	Leicester Riders (C)	30	24	6	2580	2303	+277	48	Playoffs
2	London Lions	30	23	7	2702	2441	+261	46	Playoffs
3	Plymouth Raiders	30	21	9	2511	2307	+204	42	Playoffs
4	Newcastle Eagles	30	18	12	2576	2543	+33	36	Playoffs
5	Sheffield Sharks	30	15	15	2403	2338	+65	30	Playoffs
6	Worcester Wolves	30	14	16	2349	2456	−107	28	Playoffs
7	Cheshire Phoenix	30	14	16	2357	2407	−50	28	Playoffs
8	Bristol Flyers	30	12	18	2346	2373	−27	24	Playoffs
9	Surrey Scorchers	30	10	20	2446	2615	−169	20	
10	Manchester Giants	30	10	20	2514	2601	−87	20	
11	Glasgow Rocks	30	4	26	2214	2614	−400	8	

Updated to match(es) played on 30 April 2021. Source: BBC Sport
(C) Champions

=== Ladder progression ===
- Numbers highlighted in green indicate that the team finished the round inside the top eight.
- Numbers highlighted in blue indicates the team finished first on the ladder in that round.
- Numbers highlighted in red indicates the team finished last place on the ladder in that round.

Team	1	2	3	4	5	6	7	8	9	10	11	12	13	14	15	16	17	18	19	20	21	22
Bristol Flyers	7	5	5	5	5	6	7	8	9	9	9	9	7	8	8	8	8	8	8	8	8	8
Cheshire Phoenix	6	11	11	10	8	9	8	9	8	8	7	5	6	6	3	3	4	5	5	6	7	7
Glasgow Rocks	10	10	10	11	11	11	10	10	11	11	11	11	11	11	11	11	11	11	11	11	11	11
Leicester Riders	3	1	3	3	4	3	3	3	1	1	1	1	1	1	1	1	1	1	1	1	1	1
London Lions	8	3	1	2	2	1	1	1	2	3	3	3	3	4	4	4	5	4	2	2	2	2
Manchester Giants	1	6	6	6	6	5	4	4	4	6	8	7	9	9	9	10	10	10	10	10	9	10
Newcastle Eagles	5	2	2	1	1	2	2	2	3	2	2	2	2	2	2	2	2	3	4	4	4	4
Plymouth Raiders	2	7	7	7	7	7	9	7	5	4	4	6	5	3	5	5	3	2	3	3	3	3
Sheffield Sharks	4	4	4	4	3	4	5	5	7	5	5	4	4	5	6	6	6	7	7	5	5	5
Surrey Scorchers	11	9	9	9	9	10	11	11	10	10	10	10	10	10	10	9	9	9	9	9	10	9
Worcester Wolves	9	8	8	8	10	8	6	6	6	7	6	8	8	7	7	7	7	6	6	7	6	6

== BBL Trophy ==
The BBL Trophy retained the same, 16-team bracket format as introduced for the 2018–19 season. The eleven BBL teams were joined in the first round draw by five invited teams: Solent Kestrels, Derby Trailblazers, Thames Valley Cavaliers, Hemel Storm and Reading Rockets, all from the English Basketball League.

=== First round ===
13 January 2021	Glasgow Rocks	20–0	Reading Rockets	Emirates Arena, Glasgow
		report		Attendance: N/A

22 January 2021	Sheffield Sharks	63–69	Plymouth Raiders	Ponds Forge, Sheffield
18:00	Scoring by quarter: 18–19, 10–18, 14–21, 21–11
BBL TV	Pts: Hemsley 17; Rebs: Hemsley, Lillard 6 Asts: Hemsley 3	boxscore report	Pts: Neighbour 19; Rebs: Hamilton 10; Asts: McGill 6	Attendance: 1

2 February 2021	Bristol Flyers	73–74	Newcastle Eagles	SGS College Arena, Bristol
18:00	Scoring by quarter: 30–13, 11–22, 18–23, 14–16
Flyers TV	Pts: Wilcher 15; Rebs: Lockett 9 Asts: Okereafor 7	boxscore report	Pts: Fletcher 17; Rebs: Edwards 11; Asts: Fletcher 7	Attendance: 1

5 February 2021	Surrey Scorchers	101–100	Thames Valley Cavaliers	Surrey Sports Park, Guildford
18:00	Scoring by quarter: 27–28, 29–25, 20–22, 25–25
BBL TV	Pts: Hildreth 22; Rebs: Ogedengbe 7 Asts: Cashaw, Hicks, Ogedengbe 5	boxscore report	Pts: Johnson 32; Rebs: Sylla 13; Asts: Johnson 9	Attendance: 1

7 February 2021	Cheshire Phoenix	77–63	Hemel Storm	Cheshire Oaks Arena, Ellesmere Port
17:00	Scoring by quarter: 19–16, 29–13, 17–20, 12–14
BBL TV	Pts: Hayes 23; Rebs: Hayes 13; Asts: Ross 9	boxscore report	Pts: Poleon 23; Rebs: Poleon 17; Asts: Noel 4	Attendance: 1

7 February 2021	Derby Trailblazers	73–101	Solent Kestrels	Nottingham Wildcats Arena, Nottingham
17:00	Scoring by quarter: 15–26, 22–25, 18–33, 18–17
BBL TV	Pts: Smith 21; Rebs: Bowman 12; Asts: Bowman 5	boxscore report	Pts: Charles 30; Rebs: Charles 10; Asts: Smith 12	Attendance: 3

10 February 2021	Worcester Wolves	102–96	Manchester Giants	Worcester Arena, Worcester
19:00	Scoring by quarter: 20–20, 30–30, 28–20, 24–26
YouTube	Pts: Bouwknecht 23; Rebs: Kimble, Lawson, Williams, 7 Asts: Anderson 8	boxscore report	Pts: Whelan 25; Rebs: Brady 13; Asts: Cassell Jr. 7	Attendance: 6

11 February 2021	London Lions	76–71	Leicester Riders	Copper Box Arena, London
18:00	Scoring by quarter: 13–20, 17–16, 21–16, 25–19
BBL TV	Pts: Robinson, Williams 15; Rebs: Alihodžić 12; Asts: Liggins 12	boxscore report	Pts: Johnson 16; Rebs: Nelson-Henry 14; Asts: Crandall, Nelson-Henry 3	Attendance: 2

Notes

1. A Glasgow Rocks' match against Reading Rockets was cancelled after Reading were unable to fulfil the tie due to travel-related COVID-19 concerns. Glasgow were awarded a bye to the next stage of the competition.

=== Quarter-finals ===
14 February 2021	Cheshire Phoenix	62–67	Glasgow Rocks	Cheshire Oaks Arena, Ellesmere Port
17:00	Scoring by quarter: 21–18, 15–8, 9–23, 17–18
BBL TV	Pts: Lull 20; Rebs: Gordon 12; Asts: Ross 6	boxscore report	Pts: Keeling 19; Rebs: Keeling 10; Asts: Van Sauers 5	Attendance: 10

19 February 2021	Surrey Scorchers	82–73	Solent Kestrels	Surrey Sports Park, Guildford
18:00	Scoring by quarter: 24–22, 19–10, 23–22, 16–19
BBL TV	Pts: Richards 15; Rebs: James 14; Asts: Raftopoulos 4	boxscore report	Pts: Jackman 20; Rebs: Jackman 9 Asts: Smith 4	Attendance: 0

22 February 2021	London Lions	101–85	Newcastle Eagles	Copper Box Arena, London
18:00	Scoring by quarter: 23–26, 28–18, 28–23, 22–18
BBL TV	Pts: Liggins 24; Rebs: Parker 9 Asts: Liggins 9	boxscore report	Pts: Edwards 16; Rebs: Edwards 9 Asts: Fletcher 12	Attendance: 0

24 February 2021	Worcester Wolves	66–75	Plymouth Raiders	Worcester Arena, Worcester
19:00	Scoring by quarter: 11–19, 25–20, 19–16, 11–20
YouTube	Pts: Williams 23; Rebs: Williams 13; Asts: Williams 6	boxscore report	Pts: McGill 18; Rebs: Ochereobia 7 Asts: Hamilton 4	Attendance: 0

=== Semi-finals ===
7 March 2021	London Lions	90–66 (Series: London leads, 90–66 on aggregate)	Glasgow Rocks	Copper Box Arena, London
14:30	Scoring by quarter: 23–14, 21–14, 18–18, 28–20
BBL TV	Pts: Liggins 28; Rebs: Tawiah 7 Asts: Williams 5	boxscore report	Pts: Delph 16; Rebs: Delph 8 Asts: Keeling 5	Attendance: 25

10 March 2021	Glasgow Rocks	89–108 (Series: London wins, 198–155 on aggregate)	London Lions	Emirates Arena, Glasgow
18:00	Scoring by quarter: 15–27, 27–23, 22–29, 25–29
BBL TV	Pts: Keeling 17; Rebs: Delph 9 Asts: Van Sauers 6	boxscore report	Pts: Williams 26; Rebs: Tawiah 7 Asts: Ware 6	Attendance: 4

12 March 2021	Plymouth Raiders	96–89 (Series: Plymouth leads, 96–89 on aggregate)	Surrey Scorchers	Plymouth Pavilions, Plymouth
19:30	Scoring by quarter: 21–25, 26–20, 26–22, 23–22
BBL TV	Pts: McGill 31; Rebs: Ochereobia 6 Asts: Neighbour 3	boxscore report	Pts: Hicks 27; Rebs: Richards 9 Asts: Hicks 7	Attendance: 0

14 March 2021	Surrey Scorchers	83–112 (Series: Plymouth wins, 208–172 on aggregate)	Plymouth Raiders	Surrey Sports Park, Guildford
14:00	Scoring by quarter: 21–30, 15–22, 32–28, 15–32
BBL TV	Pts: Hicks 22; Rebs: James 11; Asts: Hicks 10	boxscore report	Pts: McGill 32; Rebs: Neighbour 10; Asts: Morsell, Porter-Bunton 4	Attendance: 1

=== Final ===
21 March 2021	London Lions	88–82	Plymouth Raiders	Worcester Arena, Worcester
17:30	Scoring by quarter: 28–17, 24–21, 15–23, 21–21
Sky Sports	Pts: Williams 20; Rebs: Liggins 7 Asts: Liggins 8	boxscore report	Pts: McGill 31; Rebs: Neighbour 11; Asts: Dusha 5	Attendance: 0

== Playoffs ==
After changes were made to the 2020–21 Championship structure, the Playoffs returned to the two-legged aggregate series format used prior to the 2019–20 season.

=== Quarter-finals ===
==== (1) Leicester Riders vs. (8) Bristol Flyers ====
3 May 2021	Leicester Riders	85–56 (Series: Leicester leads, 85–56 on aggregate)	Bristol Flyers	Vertu Motors Arena, Newcastle
17:00	Scoring by quarter: 17–16, 16–14, 32–15, 20–11
Sky Sports	Pts: Crandall 21; Rebs: Lee 7 Asts: Crandall 10	boxscore report	Pts: Lockett 16; Rebs: Lockett 9 Asts: Lockett 7	Attendance: 0

5 May 2021	Leicester Riders	92–79 (Series: Leicester wins, 177–135 on aggregate)	Bristol Flyers	Worcester Arena, Worcester
17:00	Scoring by quarter: 19–21, 30–20, 24–24, 19–14
Sky Sports	Pts: Lee 17; Rebs: Walker 9 Asts: Crandall 11	boxscore report	Pts: Mockford 19; Rebs: Lockett 9 Asts: Lockett, Wilcher 5	Attendance: 0

==== (2) London Lions vs. (7) Cheshire Phoenix ====
3 May 2021	London Lions	73–66 (Series: London leads, 73–66 on aggregate)	Cheshire Phoenix	Vertu Motors Arena, Newcastle
19:30	Scoring by quarter: 21–10, 17–24, 13–15, 22–17
Sky Sports	Pts: Williams 22; Rebs: Okoroh 9 Asts: Liggins 6	boxscore report	Pts: Ross 13; Rebs: Gordon, Hayes, Lull 6 Asts: Ross 6	Attendance: 0

5 May 2021	London Lions	95–60 (Series: London wins, 168–126 on aggregate)	Cheshire Phoenix	Worcester Arena, Worcester
19:30	Scoring by quarter: 30–15, 30–16, 24–9, 11–20
Sky Sports	Pts: Williams 17; Rebs: Okoroh 8 Asts: Robinson 9	boxscore report	Pts: Bryan-Amaning 17; Rebs: Hayes 8 Asts: Ross 7	Attendance: 0

==== (4) Newcastle Eagles vs. (5) Sheffield Sharks ====
4 May 2021	Newcastle Eagles	79–77 (Series: Newcastle leads, 79–77 on aggregate)	Sheffield Sharks	Vertu Motors Arena, Newcastle
17:00	Scoring by quarter: 22–20, 30–20, 18–19, 9–18
Sky Sports	Pts: Gordon 20; Rebs: Edwards, Gordon 7 Asts: Fletcher 9	boxscore report	Pts: Hemsley 21; Rebs: Ratinho 9 Asts: Lewis 6	Attendance: 0

6 May 2021	Newcastle Eagles	81–81 (Series: Newcastle wins, 160–158 on aggregate)	Sheffield Sharks	Worcester Arena, Worcester
17:00	Scoring by quarter: 22–28, 16–15, 18–18, 25–20
Sky Sports	Pts: Gordon 25; Rebs: Gordon 9 Asts: Fletcher 9	boxscore report	Pts: Nichols; Rebs: Hemsley 9 Asts: Lillard 5	Attendance: 0

==== (3) Plymouth Raiders vs. (6) Worcester Wolves ====
4 May 2021	Plymouth Raiders	84–82 (Series: Plymouth leads, 84–82 on aggregate)	Worcester Wolves	Vertu Motors Arena, Newcastle
19:30	Scoring by quarter: 14–30, 32–18, 20–22, 18–12
Sky Sports	Pts: McGill 28; Rebs: Beisty 7 Asts: Beisty 7	boxscore report	Pts: Burns 18; Rebs: Williams 10; Asts: Williams 7	Attendance: 0

6 May 2021	Plymouth Raiders	96–81 (Series: Plymouth wins, 180–163 on aggregate)	Worcester Wolves	Worcester Arena, Worcester
19:30	Scoring by quarter: 15–21, 28–14, 25–22, 28–24
Sky Sports	Pts: McGill 29; Rebs: Hamilton 12; Asts: McGill 7	boxscore report	Pts: Anderson 21; Rebs: Williams 14; Asts: Anderson, Bouwknecht 4	Attendance: 0

=== Semi-finals ===
==== (1) Leicester Riders vs. (4) Newcastle Eagles ====
11 May 2021	Leicester Riders	77–76 (Series: Leicester leads, 77–76 on aggregate)	Newcastle Eagles	Morningside Arena, Leicester
17:00	Scoring by quarter: 36–18, 13–20, 19–14, 9–24
Sky Sports	Pts: Crandall 20; Rebs: Lee 14; Asts: Crandall 7	boxscore report	Pts: Fletcher 34; Rebs: Edwards 11; Asts: Fletcher 6	Attendance: 22

13 May 2021	Leicester Riders	69–88 (Series: Newcastle wins, 164–146 on aggregate)	Newcastle Eagles	Morningside Arena, Leicester
17:00	Scoring by quarter: 20–29, 19–11, 12–25, 18–23
Sky Sports	Pts: Nelson-Henry 13; Rebs: Nelson-Henry 11; Asts: Crandall 9	boxscore report	Pts: Fletcher 27; Rebs: Gordon 10; Asts: Fletcher 10	Attendance: 0

==== (2) London Lions vs. (3) Plymouth Raiders ====
11 May 2021	London Lions	80–92 (Series: Plymouth leads, 92–80 on aggregate)	Plymouth Raiders	Morningside Arena, Leicester
19:30	Scoring by quarter: 16–18, 18–28, 23–14, 23–32
Sky Sports	Pts: Liggins 16; Rebs: Liggins 10; Asts: Liggins 12	boxscore report	Pts: McGill 28; Rebs: Hamilton 11; Asts: Dusha, McGill 7	Attendance: 22

13 May 2021	London Lions	100–80 (Series: London wins, 180–172 on aggregate)	Plymouth Raiders	Morningside Arena, Leicester
19:30	Scoring by quarter: 33–23, 12–19, 28–21, 27–17
Sky Sports	Pts: Liggins 23; Rebs: Walker, Williams 5 Asts: Robinson 7	boxscore report	Pts: McGill 25; Rebs: Ochereobia 8 Asts: Dusha 7	Attendance: 0

=== Final ===
==== (2) London Lions vs. (4) Newcastle Eagles ====
16 May 2021	London Lions	66–68	Newcastle Eagles	Morningside Arena, Leicester
17:30	Scoring by quarter: 24–12, 11–18, 20–20, 11–18
Sky Sports	Pts: Parker 27; Rebs: Parker 12; Asts: Liggins 8	boxscore report	Pts: Edwards 22; Rebs: Edwards 13; Asts: Fletcher 10	Attendance: 0

== Awards ==
=== 2020–21 BBL Team of the Year ===
#	Player	Team
PG	Rahmon Fletcher	Newcastle Eagles
SG	Geno Crandall	Leicester Riders
SF	Dirk Williams	London Lions
PF	DeAndre Liggins	London Lions
C	Darien Nelson-Henry	Leicester Riders

Source: 2020–21 Molten BBL Team of the Year

=== 2020–21 BBL All-British Team of the Year ===
#	Player	Team
PG	Conner Washington	Leicester Riders
SG	Justin Robinson	London Lions
SF	Ashley Hamilton	Plymouth Raiders
PF	Jordan Williams	Worcester Wolves
C	David Ulph	Manchester Giants

Source: 2020–21 BBL All-British Team of the Year

=== 2020–21 BBL Defensive Team of the Year ===
#	Player	Team
PG	Cortez Edwards	Newcastle Eagles
SG	DeAndre Liggins	London Lions
SF	Jamell Anderson	Leicester Riders
PF	William Lee	Leicester Riders
C	Prince Ibeh	Plymouth Raiders

Source: 2020–21 BBL Defensive Team of the Year

- Most Valuable Player: Geno Crandall (Leicester Riders)
- Play-off Final MVP: Cortez Edwards (Newcastle Eagles)
- Coach of the Year: Rob Paternostro (Leicester Riders)

== British clubs in European competitions ==
Team	Competition	Progress
London Lions	Champions League	First qualifying round
London Lions	FIBA Europe Cup	Regular season

*Note: FIBA withdrew the London Lions from the FIBA Europe Cup Regular-season due to COVID-19 disruptions. All games of the London Lions would be forfeited.

== Notes ==
Preceded by 2019–20 season	BBL seasons 2020–21	Succeeded by 2021–22 season
