= 2020–21 London Lions season =

- Trophy champions
- Head coach: (United Kingdom) Vince Macaulay
- Captain: (United Kingdom) Joe Ikhinmwin
- Arena: Copper Box Arena

BBL results
- Record: 23–7 (.767)
- Ladder: 2nd
- BBL Cup: Runners-up (lost to Eagles 77–84)
- BBL Trophy: Champions (1st title) (Defeated Raiders 88–82)
- Playoff finish: Runners-up (lost to Eagles 66–68)
- Stats at BBL.org.uk

Player records
- Points: (United States) Williams 18.3
- Rebounds: (United Kingdom) Tawiah 5.7
- Assists: (United States) Liggins 6.9
- Efficiency: (United Kingdom) Okoroh 57%
- All statistics correct as of 30 April 2021.

The 2020–21 BBL season was the 44th season for the London Lions in the BBL, and 9th under the banner of London Lions.

The Lions play their home games at the 6,000 seat Copper Box Arena in Queen Elizabeth Olympic Park, London.

== Squad ==
=== Signings ===
- On 13 July, 2020, the London Lions announce the two-time BBL MVP, Justin Robinson has signed a two-year deal with the club.
- On 14 July, 2020, the London Lions re-signed Captain Joe Ikhinmwin for the 2020–21 BBL season. This will be his eighth season with the Lions.
- On 20 July, 2020, the Lions have brought back veteran guard, Andre Lockhart, for a sixth successive season.
- On 22 July, 2020, the London Lions signed five-year NBA veteran, DeAndre Liggins to the 2020–21 squad.
- On 27 July, 2020, the Lions signed former Sheffield Sharks player Dirk Williams for the 2020–21 squad.
- On 29 July, 2020, the London Lions re-signed Edmir Lucas for the 2020–21 BBL season.
- On 3 August, 2020, the London Lions signed Kervin Bristol after a season in Ukraine. Kervin was a member of the 2018–19 Lions squad. On 21 November, 2020, Kervin Bristol had been de-registered from the team, but remains on staff.
- On 5 August, 2020, the London Lions re-signed British international Jules Dang-Akodo for the 2020–21 BBL season.
- On 6 August, 2020, the Lions have signed young Brit, Kingsley Okoroh for the 2020–21 squad.
- On 10 August, 2020, the London Lions signed Chris Tawiah after a season in Romania. Chris was a member of the 2010–11 Lions squad.
- On 12 August, 2020, the London Lions signed American Kevin Ware for the 2020–21 BBL season.
- On 13 August, 2020, the Lions signed former tennis player and former Leicester Riders player Joshua Ward-Hibbert for the 2020–21 squad.
- On 14 August, 2020, the London Lions signed former Leicester Riders player Shane Walker after a season in Sweden.
- On 20 August, 2020, the London Lions signed six-year NBA veteran, Byron Mullens to the 2020–21 squad.
- On 13 September, 2020, the London Lions signed former Lion Matthew Bryan-Amaning to the 2020–21 squad. Bryan-Amaning was a member of the Lions in 2013. On 13 October, 2020, Bryan-Amaning parted ways with the team.
- On 16 September, 2020, the London Lions signed American Stephen Brown as an injury replacement for Jules Dang-Akodo. Brown will only appear in the Basketball Champions League.
- On 22 October, 2020 the London Lions signed Fahro Alihodžić to the 2020–21 squad.
- On 21 November, 2020, the London Lions signed Orlando Parker for the 2020–21 BBL season.
- On 11 December, 2020, the London Lions signed former Lion Jordan Spencer to the 2020–21 squad. Spencer was a member of the 2018–19 Lions squad.

=== Roster ===
Note: Flags indicate national team eligibility at FIBA-sanctioned events. Players may hold other non-FIBA nationalities not displayed.

2020–21 London Lions roster
Players
Coaches

| Pos. | No. | Nat. | Name | Ht. | Wt. |
|---|---|---|---|---|---|
| G | 0 | (Angola) | Lucas, Edmir (I) | 1.91 m (6 ft 3 in) | 94 kg (207 lb) |
| F | 2 | (United States) | Parker, Orlando (I) | 2.03 m (6 ft 8 in) | 100 kg (220 lb) |
| G | 3 | (Barbados) | Lockhart, Andre | 1.83 m (6 ft 0 in) | 86 kg (190 lb) |
| G | 5 | (United States) | Ware, Kevin (I) | 1.96 m (6 ft 5 in) | 79 kg (174 lb) |
| F | 7 | (United Kingdom) | Ikhinmwin, Joe (C) | 1.98 m (6 ft 6 in) | 100 kg (220 lb) |
| G | 10 | (United Kingdom) | Robinson, Justin | 1.85 m (6 ft 1 in) | 81 kg (179 lb) |
| G | 11 | (United States) | Williams, Dirk (I) | 1.96 m (6 ft 5 in) | 82 kg (181 lb) |
| C | 15 | (Bosnia and Herzegovina) | Alihodžić, Fahro | 2.08 m (6 ft 10 in) | 118 kg (260 lb) |
| G | 17 | (Cameroon) | Dang-Akodo, Jules | 1.91 m (6 ft 3 in) | 82 kg (181 lb) |
| G/F | 21 | (United Kingdom) | Ward-Hibbert, Joshua | 1.96 m (6 ft 5 in) | 86 kg (190 lb) |
| C | 22 | (United Kingdom) | Okoroh, Kingsley | 2.16 m (7 ft 1 in) | 121 kg (267 lb) |
| G | 23 | (United Kingdom) | Spencer, Jordan | 1.88 m (6 ft 2 in) | 82 kg (181 lb) |
| C | 25 | (United Kingdom) | Tawiah, Chris | 2.08 m (6 ft 10 in) | 107 kg (236 lb) |
| F/C | 33 | (Haiti) | Bristol, Kervin (IN) | 2.08 m (6 ft 10 in) | 102 kg (225 lb) |
| G/F | 34 | (United States) | Liggins, DeAndre (I) | 1.98 m (6 ft 6 in) | 95 kg (209 lb) |
| F/C | 44 | (United Kingdom) | Walker, Shane | 2.08 m (6 ft 10 in) | 96 kg (212 lb) |

Head coach

- (United Kingdom) Vince Macaulay

Assistant coach(es)

- (United Kingdom) Dave Greenaway

Legend

- (C) Team captain
- (DP) Development player
- (IN) Inactive
- (I) Import player
- Injured

- Roster
Updated: 11 December 2020

=== Depth chart ===
| Pos. | Starting 5 | Bench 1 | Bench 2 | Development |
|---|---|---|---|---|
| C | Chris Tawiah | Kingsley Okoroh |
| PF | Orlando Parker | Fahro Alihodžić | Joshua Ward-Hibbert | Kervin Bristol |
| SF | DeAndre Liggins | Shane Walker | Joe Ikhinmwin |
| SG | Kevin Ware | Dirk Williams | Edmir Lucas |
| PG | Justin Robinson | Andre Lockhart | Jordan Spencer | Jules Dang-Akodo |

== Preseason ==
=== Game log ===
2020–21 pre-season game log
August: 1–1 (Home: 0–0; Road: 1–1)

| Game | Date | Team | Score | High points | High rebounds | High assists | Location Attendance | Record |
|---|---|---|---|---|---|---|---|---|
| 1 | 30 August | @ B.C. Oostende | L 91–77 | Edmir Lucas (20) | Joshua Ward-Hibbert (8) | Kevin Ware (7) | Versluys Dôme | 0–1 |
| 2 | 31 August | @ B.C. Oostende | W 81–84 | DeAndre Liggins (15) | Not announced | Not announced | Versluys Dôme | 1–1 |

September: 0–1 (Home: 0–0; Road: 0–1)

| Game | Date | Team | Score | High points | High rebounds | High assists | Location Attendance | Record |
|---|---|---|---|---|---|---|---|---|
| 3 | 6 September | @ Bakken Bears | L 105–88 | DeAndre Liggins (25) | Not announced | Not announced | Vejlby-Risskov Hallen | 1–2 |

October: 2–1 (Home: 1–1; Road: 1–0)

| Game | Date | Team | Score | High points | High rebounds | High assists | Location Attendance | Record |
|---|---|---|---|---|---|---|---|---|
| 4 | 9 October | @ Surrey Scorchers | W 89–107 | Dirk Williams (41) | Not announced | Not announced | Surrey Sports Park | 2–2 |
| 5 | 12 October | Bristol Flyers | W 96–76 | Byron Mullens (27) | Chris Tawiah (13) | Andre Lockhart (5) | University of East London | 3–2 |
| 6 | 23 October | Sheffield Sharks | L 68–89 | Kevin Ware (22) | Fahro Alihodžić (9) | Kevin Ware (5) | Copper Box Arena | 3–3 |

== Basketball Champions League ==
=== Game log ===
2020–21 game log
September: 0–1 (Home: 0–0; Road: 0–1)

| Game | Date | Team | Score | High points | High rebounds | High assists | Location Attendance | Record |
|---|---|---|---|---|---|---|---|---|
| 1 | 22 September | @ Neptūnas | L 77–73 | Matthew Bryan-Amaning (16) | Matthew Bryan-Amaning (6) | Kevin Ware (4) | Arena Botevgrad | 0–1 |

== FIBA Europe Cup ==
=== Game log ===
2020–21 game log
January: 0–0 (Home: 0–0; Road: 0–0)

| Game | Date | Team | Score | High points | High rebounds | High assists | Location Attendance | Record |
|---|---|---|---|---|---|---|---|---|
| 1 | 26 January | @ Anwil Włocławek | Withdrawn | | | | | |
| 2 | 27 January | Fribourg Olympic | Withdrawn | | | | | |
| 3 | 29 January | @ Dnipro | Withdrawn | | | | | |

*Note: FIBA has withdrawn the London Lions from the FIBA Europe Cup Regular Season due to COVID-19 disruptions. All games of the London Lions will be forfeited.

== BBL Cup ==
=== Standings ===
| Pos | Team | Pld | W | L | PF | PA | PD | Pts | Qualification |
|---|---|---|---|---|---|---|---|---|---|
| 1 | Newcastle Eagles | 6 | 4 | 2 | 539 | 526 | +13 | 8 | Quarter Finals |
| 2 | Leicester Riders | 5 | 3 | 2 | 455 | 422 | +33 | 6 | Quarter Finals |
| 3 | London Lions | 6 | 3 | 3 | 501 | 497 | +4 | 6 | Quarter Finals |
| 4 | Sheffield Sharks | 5 | 1 | 4 | 371 | 421 | −50 | 2 | |

Updated to match(es) played on 29 November 2020. Source: BBC Sport

=== Game log ===
2020–21 game log
November: 3–3 (Home: 2–1; Road: 1–2)

| Game | Date | Team | Score | High points | High rebounds | High assists | Location Attendance | Record |
|---|---|---|---|---|---|---|---|---|
| 1 | 1 November | Newcastle Eagles | L 79–89 (OT) | Dirk Williams (19) | DeAndre Liggins (11) | DeAndre Liggins (5) | Copper Box Arena | 0–1 |
| 2 | 6 November | @ Sheffield Sharks | L 70–61 | DeAndre Liggins (18) | Kevin Ware (8) | Justin Robinson (3) | Ponds Forge | 0–2 |
| 3 | 13 November | Sheffield Sharks | W 88–73 | DeAndre Liggins (32) | Liggins, Ware (7) | Justin Robinson (7) | Copper Box Arena | 1–2 |
| 4 | 15 November | @ Leicester Riders | L 97–76 | Dirk Williams (20) | DeAndre Liggins (8) | Dirk Williams (7) | Morningside Arena | 1–3 |
| 5 | 20 November | @ Newcastle Eagles | W 79–99 | Justin Robinson (23) | DeAndre Liggins (14) | Kevin Ware (4) | Eagles Community Arena | 2–3 |
| 6 | 22 November | Leicester Riders | W 98–89 | DeAndre Liggins (26) | Chris Taiwah (9) | Kevin Ware (5) | Copper Box Arena | 3–3 |

December: 1–0 (Home: 0–0; Road: 1–0)

| Game | Date | Team | Score | High points | High rebounds | High assists | Location Attendance | Record |
|---|---|---|---|---|---|---|---|---|
| 7 | 16 December | @ Plymouth Raiders | W 80–85 (OT) | Dirk Williams (20) | Orlando Parker (8) | Liggins, Robinson (6) | Plymouth Pavilions | 4–3 |

January: 1–1 (Home: 1–1; Road: 0–0)

| Game | Date | Team | Score | High points | High rebounds | High assists | Location Attendance | Record |
|---|---|---|---|---|---|---|---|---|
| 8 | 12 January | Manchester Giants | W 20–0 | N/A | N/A | N/A | National Basketball Performance Centre | 5–3 |
| 9 | 24 January | Newcastle Eagles | L 77–84 | Dirk Williams (19) | Kevin Ware (9) | Justin Robinson (6) | Morningside Arena | 5–4 |

== BBL Trophy ==
=== Game log ===
2020–21 game log
February: 2–0 (Home: 2–0; Road: 0–0)

| Game | Date | Team | Score | High points | High rebounds | High assists | Location Attendance | Record |
|---|---|---|---|---|---|---|---|---|
| 1 | 11 February | Leicester Riders | W 76–71 | Robinson, Williams (15) | Fahro Alihodžić (12) | DeAndre Liggins (12) | Copper Box Arena | 1–0 |
| 2 | 22 February | Newcastle Eagles | W 101–85 | DeAndre Liggins (24) | Orlando Parker (9) | DeAndre Liggins (9) | Copper Box Arena | 2–0 |

March: 3–0 (Home: 2–0; Road: 1–0)

| Game | Date | Team | Score | High points | High rebounds | High assists | Location Attendance | Record |
|---|---|---|---|---|---|---|---|---|
| 3 | 7 March | Glasgow Rocks | W 90–66 | DeAndre Liggins (28) | Chris Tawiah (7) | Dirk Williams (5) | Copper Box Arena | 3–0 |
| 4 | 10 March | @ Glasgow Rocks | W 89–108 | Dirk Williams (26) | Chris Tawiah (7) | Kevin Ware (6) | Emirates Arena | 4–0 |
| 5 | 21 March | Plymouth Raiders | W 88–82 | Dirk Williams (20) | DeAndre Liggins (7) | DeAndre Liggins (8) | Worcester Arena | 5–0 |

== BBL Championship ==
=== Standings ===
| Pos | Team | Pld | W | L | PF | PA | PD | Pts | Qualification |
|---|---|---|---|---|---|---|---|---|---|
| 1 | Leicester Riders (C) | 30 | 24 | 6 | 2580 | 2303 | +277 | 48 | Playoffs |
| 2 | London Lions | 30 | 23 | 7 | 2702 | 2441 | +261 | 46 | Playoffs |
| 3 | Plymouth Raiders | 30 | 21 | 9 | 2511 | 2307 | +204 | 42 | Playoffs |
| 4 | Newcastle Eagles | 30 | 18 | 12 | 2576 | 2543 | +33 | 36 | Playoffs |
| 5 | Sheffield Sharks | 30 | 15 | 15 | 2403 | 2338 | +65 | 30 | Playoffs |
| 6 | Worcester Wolves | 30 | 14 | 16 | 2349 | 2456 | −107 | 28 | Playoffs |
| 7 | Cheshire Phoenix | 30 | 14 | 16 | 2357 | 2407 | −50 | 28 | Playoffs |
| 8 | Bristol Flyers | 30 | 12 | 18 | 2346 | 2373 | −27 | 24 | Playoffs |
| 9 | Surrey Scorchers | 30 | 10 | 20 | 2446 | 2615 | −169 | 20 | |
| 10 | Manchester Giants | 30 | 10 | 20 | 2514 | 2601 | −87 | 20 | |
| 11 | Glasgow Rocks | 30 | 4 | 26 | 2214 | 2614 | −400 | 8 | |

Updated to match(es) played on 30 April 2021. Source: BBC Sport
(C) Champions

=== Game log ===
2020–21 game log
December: 4–1 (Home: 3–0; Road: 1–1)

| Game | Date | Team | Score | High points | High rebounds | High assists | Location Attendance | Record |
|---|---|---|---|---|---|---|---|---|
| 1 | 3 December | @ Newcastle Eagles | L 88–79 | Justin Robinson (17) | Ikhinmwin, Taiwah, Williams (5) | Justin Robinson (8) | Eagles Community Arena | 0–1 |
| 2 | 11 December | Plymouth Raiders | W 101–95 | Orlando Parker (22) | Alihodžić, Liggins (5) | DeAndre Liggins (11) | Copper Box Arena | 1–1 |
| 3 | 13 December | @ Cheshire Phoenix | W 99–110 | Orlando Parker (25) | Orlando Parker (7) | DeAndre Liggins (8) | Cheshire Oaks Arena | 2–1 |
| 4 | 18 December | Manchester Giants | W 92–88 | Dirk Williams (37) | Orlando Parker (9) | Kevin Ware (7) | Copper Box Arena | 3–1 |
| 5 | 21 December | Worcester Wolves | W 103–71 | Orlando Parker (25) | Shane Walker (8) | Justin Robinson (9) | Copper Box Arena | 4–1 |

January: 4–0 (Home: 2–0; Road: 2–0)

| Game | Date | Team | Score | High points | High rebounds | High assists | Location Attendance | Record |
|---|---|---|---|---|---|---|---|---|
| 6 | 3 January | @ Leicester Riders | W 73–74 | Dirk Williams (19) | Liggins, Parker (11) | Liggins, Robinson (7) | Morningside Arena | 5–1 |
| 7 | 8 January | Newcastle Eagles | W 109–89 | Dirk Williams (24) | Chris Tawiah (10) | DeAndre Liggins (8) | Copper Box Arena | 6–1 |
| 8 | 9 January | Glasgow Rocks | W 91–74 | Dirk Williams (17) | Orlando Parker (8) | DeAndre Liggins (7) | Copper Box Arena | 7–1 |
| 9 | 15 January | @ Bristol Flyers | W 70–98 | DeAndre Liggins (18) | DeAndre Liggins (7) | DeAndre Liggins (7) | SGS College Arena | 8–1 |

February: 2–3 (Home: 0–1; Road: 2–2)

| Game | Date | Team | Score | High points | High rebounds | High assists | Location Attendance | Record |
|---|---|---|---|---|---|---|---|---|
| 10 | 7 February | Plymouth Raiders | L 75–81 | Justin Robinson (15) | DeAndre Liggins (12) | DeAndre Liggins (9) | Copper Box Arena | 8–2 |
| 11 | 14 February | @ Plymouth Raiders | W 70–87 | Liggins, Williams (25) | Dirk Williams (7) | DeAndre Liggins (6) | Plymouth Pavilions | 9–2 |
| 12 | 19 February | @ Cheshire Phoenix | L 87–80 | Justin Robinson (24) | Chris Tawiah (11) | DeAndre Liggins (5) | Cheshire Oaks Arena | 9–3 |
| 13 | 24 February | @ Surrey Scorchers | W 97–98 | DeAndre Liggins (20) | Fahro Alihodžić (10) | DeAndre Liggins (11) | Surrey Sports Park | 10–3 |
| 14 | 28 February | @ Sheffield Sharks | L 83–72 | DeAndre Liggins (25) | DeAndre Liggins (10) | Liggins, Robinson (4) | Ponds Forge | 10–4 |

March: 2–3 (Home: 2–1; Road: 0–2)

| Game | Date | Team | Score | High points | High rebounds | High assists | Location Attendance | Record |
|---|---|---|---|---|---|---|---|---|
| 15 | 12 March | Manchester Giants | W 105–81 | Kevin Ware (24) | Fahro Alihodžić (9) | DeAndre Liggins (7) | Copper Box Arena | 11–4 |
| 16 | 14 March | @ Leicester Riders | L 78–73 | Justin Robinson (21) | Joshua Ward-Hibbert (7) | Justin Robinson (5) | Morningside Arena | 11–5 |
| 17 | 26 March | @ Newcastle Eagles | L 109–95 | Dirk Williams (20) | Orlando Parker (8) | Jordan Spencer (10) | Vertu Motors Arena | 11–6 |
| 18 | 28 March | Worcester Wolves | L 72–84 | Kevin Ware (19) | Chris Tawiah (9) | Kevin Ware (5) | Copper Box Arena | 11–7 |
| 19 | 31 March | Surrey Scorchers | W 109–90 | Dirk Williams (35) | Orlando Parker (9) | Liggins, Ware (5) | Copper Box Arena | 12–7 |

April: 11–0 (Home: 6–0; Road: 5–0)

| Game | Date | Team | Score | High points | High rebounds | High assists | Location Attendance | Record |
|---|---|---|---|---|---|---|---|---|
| 20 | 2 April | Sheffield Sharks | W 93–81 | Dirk Williams (25) | Alihodžić, Tawiah (8) | DeAndre Liggins (10) | Vertu Motors Arena | 13–7 |
| 21 | 4 April | @ Worcester Wolves | W 85–93 (OT) | Orlando Parker (22) | Chris Tawiah (12) | DeAndre Liggins (9) | Worcester Arena | 14–7 |
| 22 | 7 April | Glasgow Rocks | W 110–73 | DeAndre Liggins (30) | Alihodžić, Spencer, Tawiah (6) | DeAndre Liggins (7) | Copper Box Arena | 15–7 |
| 23 | 10 April | @ Bristol Flyers | W 73–84 | DeAndre Liggins (18) | Chris Tawiah (8) | DeAndre Liggins (10) | SGS College Arena | 16–7 |
| 24 | 14 April | Cheshire Phoenix | W 87–61 | Dirk Williams (17) | Parker, Tawiah (8) | Justin Robinson (7) | Copper Box Arena | 17–7 |
| 25 | 16 April | Surrey Scorchers | W 92–84 | DeAndre Liggins (33) | Fahro Alihodžić (10) | DeAndre Liggins (4) | Copper Box Arena | 18–7 |
| 26 | 18 April | Bristol Flyers | W 85–74 | Dirk Williams (19) | Alihodžić, Ware (5) | DeAndre Liggins (9) | Copper Box Arena | 19–7 |
| 27 | 21 April | Leicester Riders | W 86–81 | Dirk Williams (29) | Joshua Ward-Hibbert (7) | DeAndre Liggins (7) | Copper Box Arena | 20–7 |
| 28 | 25 April | @ Glasgow Rocks | W 68–73 | Dirk Williams (17) | Parker, Ward-Hibbert (6) | Jules Dang-Akodo (5) | Emirates Arena | 21–7 |
| 29 | 28 April | @ Manchester Giants | W 86–96 | Dirk Williams (23) | Fahro Alihodžić (9) | Liggins, Robinson (6) | National Basketball Performance Centre | 22–7 |
| 30 | 30 April | @ Sheffield Sharks | W 68–80 | Dirk Williams (20) | DeAndre Liggins (10) | DeAndre Liggins (10) | Ponds Forge | 23–7 |

== BBL Playoffs ==
=== Game log ===
2021 playoff game log
May: 3–2 (Home: 3–2; Road: 0–0)

| Game | Date | Team | Score | High points | High rebounds | High assists | Location Attendance | Record |
|---|---|---|---|---|---|---|---|---|
| 1 | 3 May | Cheshire Phoenix | W 73–66 | Dirk Williams (22) | Kingsley Okoroh (9) | DeAndre Liggins (6) | Vertu Motors Arena | 1–0 |
| 2 | 5 May | Cheshire Phoenix | W 95–60 | Dirk Williams (17) | Kingsley Okoroh (8) | Justin Robinson (9) | Worcester Arena | 2–0 |
| 3 | 11 May | Plymouth Raiders | L 80–92 | DeAndre Liggins (16) | DeAndre Liggins (10) | DeAndre Liggins (12) | Morningside Arena | 2–1 |
| 4 | 13 May | Plymouth Raiders | W 100–80 | DeAndre Liggins (23) | Walker, Williams (5) | Justin Robinson (7) | Morningside Arena | 3–1 |
| 5 | 16 May | Newcastle Eagles | L 66–68 | Orlando Parker (27) | Orlando Parker (12) | DeAndre Liggins (8) | Morningside Arena | 3–2 |

== See also ==
- 2020–21 British Basketball League season
