= 2019–20 Louisville Cardinals men's basketball team =

American college basketball season

2019–20 Louisville Cardinals men's basketball
- Conference: Atlantic Coast Conference

Ranking
- Coaches: No. 13
- AP: No. 14
- Record: 24–7 (15–5 ACC)
- Head coach: Chris Mack (2nd season)
- Assistant coaches: Dino Gaudio; Luke Murray; Mike Pegues
- Home arena: KFC Yum! Center

2019–20 ACC men's basketball standings
	Conf.				Overall
Team	W		L	PCT	W		L	PCT
No. 4 Florida State	16	–	4	.800	26	–	5	.839
No. 16 Virginia	15	–	5	.750	23	–	7	.767
No. 14 Louisville	15	–	5	.750	24	–	7	.774
No. 11 Duke	15	–	5	.750	25	–	6	.806
Georgia Tech*	11	–	9	.550	17	–	14	.548
NC State	10	–	10	.500	20	–	12	.625
Syracuse	10	–	10	.500	18	–	14	.563
Notre Dame	10	–	10	.500	20	–	12	.625
Clemson	9	–	11	.450	16	–	15	.516
Miami (FL)	7	–	13	.350	15	–	16	.484
Boston College	7	–	13	.350	13	–	18	.419
Virginia Tech	7	–	13	.350	16	–	16	.500
Wake Forest	6	–	14	.300	13	–	18	.419
Pittsburgh	6	–	14	.300	16	–	17	.485
North Carolina	6	–	14	.300	14	–	19	.424
*Ineligible for postseason due to NCAA violations. Note: The 2020 ACC tournament was cancelled before the quarterfinals due to the COVID-19 pandemic. Rankings from AP poll

The 2019–20 Louisville Cardinals men's basketball team represented the University of Louisville during the 2019–20 NCAA Division I men's basketball season. The team played its home games on Denny Crum Court at the KFC Yum! Center in downtown Louisville, Kentucky as members of the Atlantic Coast Conference. They were led by second-year head coach Chris Mack.

The Cardinals finished the season 24–7, and 15–5 in ACC play. The team was scheduled to play Syracuse in the quarterfinals of the ACC tournament before the tournament was cancelled due to the COVID-19 pandemic. The NCAA tournament was also cancelled due to the pandemic.

== Previous season ==
The Cardinals finished the 2018–19 season with a record of 20–14, 10–8 in ACC play, finishing in a tie for 6th place. They defeated Notre Dame in the second round of the ACC tournament before losing to North Carolina in the quarterfinals. They received an at-large bid to the NCAA tournament as a No. 7 seed, where they lost in the first round to Minnesota.

== Offseason ==
=== Departures ===
Name	Number	Pos.	Height	Weight	Year	Hometown	Reason for departure
Akoy Agau	0	F	6'8"	240	Graduate Student	South Sudan	Graduated
Christen Cunningham	1	G	6'2"	190	Graduate Student	Georgetown, KY	Graduated
Jo Griffin	3	G	6'1"	200	Sophomore	La Grange, KY	Walk-on; Transferred to Kentucky Wesleyan
Khwan Fore	4	G	6'0"	185	Graduate Student	Huntsville, AL	Graduated
Wyatt Battalie	10	G/F	6'4"	195	Freshman	Pikeville, KY	Walk-on; transferred to Kentucky Wesleyan
Jacob Redding	12	G	6'0"	180	Sophomore	Fort Wayne, IN	Walk-on; Transferred to North Greenville
V. J. King	13	G/F	6'6"	215	Junior	Cleveland, OH	Play professionally

=== Incoming transfers ===
Name	Number	Pos.	Height	Weight	Year	Hometown	Previous School
Lamarr Kimble	0	G	6'0"	185	Graduate Student	Philadelphia, PA	Transferred from Saint Joseph's. Will be eligible to play immediately since Kimble graduated from Saint Joseph's.
Keith Oddo	1	G	6'1"	185	Graduate Student	Roanoke, VA	Transferred from Richmond. Will be eligible to play immediately since Oddo graduated from Richmond.

=== 2019 recruiting class ===
College recruiting
Name	Hometown	School	Height	Weight	Commit date
Samuell Williamson; SF	Rockwall, TX	Rockwall High School	6 ft 7 in (2.01 m)	190 lb (86 kg)	Sep 17, 2018
Samuell Williamson; SF	Recruit ratings: Scout: Rivals: 247Sports: ESPN:				
Aidan Igiehon; PF	Dublin, Ireland	Lawrence Woodmere Academy	6 ft 9 in (2.06 m)	225 lb (102 kg)	Oct 19, 2018
Aidan Igiehon; PF	Recruit ratings: Scout: Rivals: 247Sports: ESPN:				
David Johnson; PG	Louisville, KY	Trinity High School	6 ft 4 in (1.93 m)	200 lb (91 kg)	Sep 22, 2018
David Johnson; PG	Recruit ratings: Scout: Rivals: 247Sports: ESPN:				
Josh Nickelberry; SG	Fayetteville, NC	Northwood Temple Academy	6 ft 3 in (1.91 m)	180 lb (82 kg)	May 31, 2018
Josh Nickelberry; SG	Recruit ratings: Scout: Rivals: 247Sports: ESPN:				
Jae'Lyn Withers; PF	Cleveland Heights, OH	Cleveland Heights High School	6 ft 9 in (2.06 m)	215 lb (98 kg)	Sep 9, 2018
Jae'Lyn Withers; PF	Recruit ratings: Scout: Rivals: 247Sports: ESPN:				
Quinn Slazinski; PF	Houston, TX	Huntington Prep	6 ft 7 in (2.01 m)	200 lb (91 kg)	Sep 27, 2018
Quinn Slazinski; PF	Recruit ratings: Scout: Rivals: 247Sports: ESPN:				
Overall recruit ranking:
Note: In many cases, Scout, Rivals, 247Sports, On3, and ESPN may conflict in their listings of height and weight.; In these cases, the average was taken. ESPN grades are on a 100-point scale.; Sources: "2019 Louisville Commitments". Rivals.; "Men's Basketball Recruiting". Scout.; "ESPN- Louisville Cardinals Men's Basketball Recruiting". ESPN.; "Scout.com Team Recruiting Rankings". Scout.; "2019 Team Ranking". Rivals.

=== 2020 Recruiting class ===
College recruiting (2020)
Name	Hometown	School	Height	Weight	Commit date
D'Andre Davis; SF	Indianapolis, IN	Lawrence Central High School	6 ft 5 in (1.96 m)	185 lb (84 kg)	Oct 20, 2019
D'Andre Davis; SF	Recruit ratings: Scout: Rivals: 247Sports: ESPN:				
J.J. Traynor; PF	Bardstown, KY	Bardstown High School	6 ft 8 in (2.03 m)	195 lb (88 kg)	Oct 30, 2019
J.J. Traynor; PF	Recruit ratings: Scout: Rivals: 247Sports: ESPN:				
Overall recruit ranking:
Note: In many cases, Scout, Rivals, 247Sports, On3, and ESPN may conflict in their listings of height and weight.; In these cases, the average was taken. ESPN grades are on a 100-point scale.; Sources: "2020 Louisville Commitments". Rivals.; "Men's Basketball Recruiting". Scout.; "ESPN- Louisville Cardinals Men's Basketball Recruiting". ESPN.; "Scout.com Team Recruiting Rankings". Scout.; "2020 Team Ranking". Rivals.

== Roster ==
2019–20 Louisville Cardinals men's basketball team
Players
Coaches

Pos.	#	Name	Height	Weight	Year	Previous school	Hometown
G	0	Lamarr Kimble	6 ft 0 in (1.83 m)	185 lb (84 kg)	GS	Saint Joseph's; Neumann-Goretti	Philadelphia, PA
G	1	Keith Oddo	6 ft 2 in (1.88 m)	180 lb (82 kg)	GS	Richmond; North Cross School	Roanoke, VA
G	2	Darius Perry	6 ft 2 in (1.88 m)	195 lb (88 kg)	Jr	Wheeler	Marietta, GA
F	3	Jae'Lyn Withers	6 ft 8 in (2.03 m)	215 lb (98 kg)	Fr	Cleveland Heights	Charlotte, NC
G	4	Grant Williams (W)	5 ft 11 in (1.8 m)	165 lb (75 kg)	Jr	South Oldham	Crestwood, KY
F/C	5	Malik Williams	6 ft 11 in (2.11 m)	245 lb (111 kg)	Jr	Snider	Fort Wayne, IN
G/F	10	Samuell Williamson	6 ft 7 in (2.01 m)	200 lb (91 kg)	Fr	Rockwall	Rockwall, TX
F	11	Quinn Slazinski	6 ft 8 in (2.03 m)	215 lb (98 kg)	Fr	Huntington Prep	Houston, TX
C	12	Hogan Orbaugh (W)	6 ft 8 in (2.03 m)	240 lb (109 kg)	Fr	Zionsville	Zionsville, IN
G	13	David Johnson	6 ft 5 in (1.96 m)	210 lb (95 kg)	Fr	Trinity	Louisville, KY
G	20	Josh Nickelberry	6 ft 4 in (1.93 m)	200 lb (91 kg)	Fr	Northwood Temple Academy	Fayetteville, NC
F	22	Aidan Igiehon	6 ft 10 in (2.08 m)	240 lb (109 kg)	Fr	Lawrence Woodmere Academy	Dublin, Ireland
C	23	Steven Enoch	6 ft 10 in (2.08 m)	255 lb (116 kg)	RS Sr	UConn; St. Thomas More	Norwalk, CT
F	24	Dwayne Sutton	6 ft 5 in (1.96 m)	220 lb (100 kg)	RS Sr	UNC Asheville duPont Manual	Louisville, KY
G	30	Ryan McMahon	6 ft 0 in (1.83 m)	185 lb (84 kg)	RS Sr	Cardinal Mooney	Sarasota, FL
F	33	Jordan Nwora	6 ft 7 in (2.01 m)	225 lb (102 kg)	Jr	Vermont Academy	Buffalo, NY

Head coach

- Chris Mack (Xavier)

Assistant coach(es)

- Dino Gaudio (Ohio)
- Luke Murray (Fairfield)
- Mike Pegues (Delaware)

Legend

- (C) Team captain
- (S) Suspended
- (I) Ineligible
- (W) Walk-on
- Injured
- Current redshirt

Roster

== Schedule and results ==
Date time, TV	Rank^{#}	Opponent^{#}	Result	Record	High points	High rebounds	High assists	Site (attendance) city, state
Exhibition
October 29, 2019*; 7:00 pm, ACCNX	No. 5	Bellarmine	W 75–65	–	28 – Nwora	13 – Sutton	5 – Nwora	KFC Yum! Center (15,009); Louisville, KY
Regular season
November 5, 2019; 6:30 pm, ACCN	No. 5	at Miami (FL)	W 87–74	1–0 (1–0)	23 – Nwora	12 – Tied	4 – Perry	Watsco Center (7,576); Coral Gables, FL
November 10, 2019*; 2:00 pm, ACCRSN	No. 5	Youngstown State; Global Sports Shootout	W 78–55	2–0	21 – Nwora	14 – Enoch	12 – Perry	KFC Yum! Center (14,761); Louisville, KY
November 13, 2019*; 8:00 pm, ACCN	No. 4	Indiana State	W 91–62	3–0	21 – Nwora	10 – Tied	4 – Williamson	KFC Yum! Center (14,808); Louisville, KY
November 17, 2019*; 5:00 pm, ACCN	No. 4	North Carolina Central; Global Sports Shootout	W 87–58	4–0	17 – Nwora	7 – Igiehon	7 – Perry	KFC Yum! Center (14,874); Louisville, KY
November 20, 2019*; 7:00 pm, ACCN	No. 2	USC Upstate; Global Sports Shootout	W 76–50	5–0	28 – Nwora	15 – Sutton	9 – Perry	KFC Yum! Center (14,410); Louisville, KY
November 24, 2019*; 6:00 pm, ACCN	No. 2	Akron; Global Sports Shootout	W 82–76	6–0	18 – Nwora	14 – Sutton	3 – Perry	KFC Yum! Center (14,889); Louisville, KY
November 29, 2019*; 5:00 pm, CBSSN on Facebook	No. 2	vs. Western Kentucky	W 71–54	7–0	25 – Nwora	9 – Williams	4 – Kimble	Bridgestone Arena (12,863); Nashville, TN
December 3, 2019*; 7:30 pm, ESPN	No. 1	No. 4 Michigan; ACC–Big Ten Challenge	W 58–43	8–0	22 – Nwora	12 – Nwora	3 – Kimble	KFC Yum! Center (21,674); Louisville, KY
December 6, 2019; 9:00 pm, ACCN	No. 1	Pittsburgh	W 64–46	9–0 (2–0)	19 – Nwora	11 – Williams	5 – Sutton	KFC Yum! Center (17,249); Louisville, KY
December 10, 2019*; 7:00 pm, ESPN	No. 1	vs. Texas Tech; Jimmy V Classic	L 57–70	9–1	14 – Nwora	9 – Tied	3 – Tied	Madison Square Garden; New York, NY
December 14, 2019*; 12:00 pm, ACCN	No. 1	Eastern Kentucky	W 99–67	10–1	26 – Nwora	7 – Tied	6 – McMahon	KFC Yum! Center (16,185); Louisville, KY
December 18, 2019*; 8:30 pm, ACCN	No. 3	Miami (OH)	W 70–46	11–1	20 – Nwora	15 – Sutton	5 – Perry	KFC Yum! Center (15,444); Louisville, KY
December 28, 2019*; 3:45 pm, CBS	No. 3	at No. 19 Kentucky; Battle for the Bluegrass	L 70–78 ^{OT}	11–2	18 – Enoch	10 – Sutton	4 – Tied	Rupp Arena (20,437); Lexington, KY
January 4, 2020; 2:00 pm, ESPN2	No. 7	No. 18 Florida State	L 65–78	11–3 (2–1)	32 – Nwora	10 – Nwora	4 – Sutton	KFC Yum! Center (17,786); Louisville, KY
January 7, 2020; 7:00 pm, ESPN2	No. 13	Miami (FL)	W 74–58	12–3 (3–1)	19 – Nwora	13 – Sutton	4 – Nwora	KFC Yum! Center (14,980); Louisville, KY
January 11, 2020; 2:00 pm, ESPN	No. 13	at Notre Dame	W 67–64	13–3 (4–1)	20 – Nwora	14 – Sutton	4 – Kimble	Edmund P. Joyce Center (8,404); South Bend, IN
January 14, 2020; 7:00 pm, ACCN	No. 11	at Pittsburgh	W 73–68 ^{OT}	14–3 (5–1)	14 – Nwora	9 – Sutton	6 – Kimble	Petersen Events Center (9,221); Pittsburgh, PA
January 18, 2020; 6:00 pm, ESPN	No. 11	at No. 3 Duke; ESPN College GameDay	W 79–73	15–3 (6–1)	19 – Johnson	8 – Nwora	7 – Johnson	Cameron Indoor Stadium (9,314); Durham, NC
January 22, 2020; 7:00 pm, ACCRSN	No. 6	Georgia Tech	W 68–64	16–3 (7–1)	13 – Williams	7 – Nwora	3 – Kimble	KFC Yum! Center (15,001); Louisville, KY
January 25, 2020; 2:00 pm, ACCRSN	No. 6	Clemson	W 80–62	17–3 (8–1)	19 – Perry	11 – Sutton	6 – Johnson	KFC Yum! Center (17,654); Louisville, KY
January 29, 2020; 9:00 pm, ACCN	No. 6	at Boston College	W 86–69	18–3 (9–1)	37 – Nwora	13 – Williams	6 – Johnson	Conte Forum (5,771); Chestnut Hill, MA
February 1, 2020; 2:00 pm, ESPN	No. 6	at NC State	W 77–57	19–3 (10–1)	23 – McMahon	9 – Nwora	5 – Kimble	PNC Arena (18,197); Raleigh, NC
February 5, 2020; 9:00 pm, ESPN2	No. 5	Wake Forest	W 86–76	20–3 (11–1)	21 – Nwora	11 – Sutton	4 – Sutton	KFC Yum! Center (15,270); Louisville, KY
February 8, 2020; 4:00 pm, ESPN	No. 5	Virginia	W 80–73	21–3 (12–1)	22 – Nwora	7 – Nwora	5 – Johnson	KFC Yum! Center (19,250); Louisville, KY
February 12, 2020; 8:00 pm, ACCN	No. 5	at Georgia Tech	L 58–64	21–4 (12–2)	16 – Tied	10 – Sutton	2 – 3 tied	McCamish Pavilion (5,801); Atlanta, GA
February 15, 2020; 4:00 pm, ACCN	No. 5	at Clemson	L 62–77	21–5 (12–3)	18 – Sutton	7 – Sutton	8 – Johnson	Littlejohn Coliseum (9,146); Clemson, SC
February 19, 2020; 7:00 pm, ESPN	No. 11	Syracuse	W 90–66	22–5 (13–3)	19 – Nwora	13 – Williams	7 – Johnson	KFC Yum! Center (16,428); Louisville, KY
February 22, 2020; 4:00 pm, ESPN	No. 11	North Carolina	W 72–55	23–5 (14–3)	18 – Nwora	11 – Nwora	5 – Johnson	KFC Yum! Center (21,079); Louisville, KY
February 24, 2020; 7:00 pm, ESPN	No. 11	at No. 6 Florida State	L 67–82	23–6 (14–4)	14 – McMahon	8 – Nwora	4 – Johnson	Donald L. Tucker Center (11,500); Tallahassee, FL
March 1, 2020; 6:00 pm, ACCN	No. 11	Virginia Tech	W 68–52	24–6 (15–4)	20 – Nwora	12 – Nwora	6 – Johnson	KFC Yum! Center (18,104); Louisville, KY
March 7, 2020; 4:00 pm, ESPN	No. 10	at No. 22 Virginia	L 54–57	24–7 (15–5)	18 – Nwora	11 – Nwora	6 – Kimble	John Paul Jones Arena (14,629); Charlottesville, VA
ACC tournament
March 12, 2020; 9:00 pm, ESPN	(3) No. 15	vs. (6) Syracuse; Quarterfinals	ACC Tournament Cancelled					Greensboro Coliseum; Greensboro, NC
*Non-conference game. ^{#}Rankings from AP Poll. (#) Tournament seedings in parentheses. All times are in Eastern Time.

== Rankings ==
Ranking movements Legend: ██ Increase in ranking ██ Decrease in ranking ( ) = First-place votes
	Week																			
Poll	Pre	1	2	3	4	5	6	7	8	9	10	11	12	13	14	15	16	17	18	Final
AP	5	4 (1)	2 (8)	2 (7)	1 (48)	1 (55)	3 (1)	3 (1)	7	13	11	6	6	5	5	11	11	10	15	14
Coaches	5	5	2 (1)	2 (1)	1 (25)	1 (28)	5	4 (2)	8	11	10	5	5	5	5	11	10	10	14	13

*AP does not release post-NCAA Tournament rankings
