= Alihodžić =

Alihodžić is a surname, derived from Turkish Ali Hoca. Notable people with the surname include:

- Dževad Alihodžić (born 1969), Bosnian and Yugoslav basketball player
- Fahro Alihodžić (born 1989), Bosnian-British basketball player
- Haris Alihodžić (born 1968), Bosnian footballer
