= 2019–20 North Carolina Tar Heels men's basketball team =

American college basketball season

2019–20 North Carolina Tar Heels men's basketball
- Conference: Atlantic Coast Conference
- Record: 14–19 (6–14 ACC)
- Head coach: Roy Williams (17th season)
- Assistant coaches: Steve Robinson (17th season); Hubert Davis (8th season); Brad Frederick (3rd season)
- Home arena: Dean E. Smith Center

2019–20 ACC men's basketball standings
	Conf.				Overall
Team	W		L	PCT	W		L	PCT
No. 4 Florida State	16	–	4	.800	26	–	5	.839
No. 16 Virginia	15	–	5	.750	23	–	7	.767
No. 14 Louisville	15	–	5	.750	24	–	7	.774
No. 11 Duke	15	–	5	.750	25	–	6	.806
Georgia Tech*	11	–	9	.550	17	–	14	.548
NC State	10	–	10	.500	20	–	12	.625
Syracuse	10	–	10	.500	18	–	14	.563
Notre Dame	10	–	10	.500	20	–	12	.625
Clemson	9	–	11	.450	16	–	15	.516
Miami (FL)	7	–	13	.350	15	–	16	.484
Boston College	7	–	13	.350	13	–	18	.419
Virginia Tech	7	–	13	.350	16	–	16	.500
Wake Forest	6	–	14	.300	13	–	18	.419
Pittsburgh	6	–	14	.300	16	–	17	.485
North Carolina	6	–	14	.300	14	–	19	.424
*Ineligible for postseason due to NCAA violations. Note: The 2020 ACC tournament was cancelled before the quarterfinals due to the COVID-19 pandemic. Rankings from AP poll

The 2019–20 North Carolina Tar Heels men's basketball team represented the University of North Carolina at Chapel Hill during the 2019–20 NCAA Division I men's basketball season. The team's head coach is Roy Williams, who was in his 17th season as UNC's head men's basketball coach. The Tar Heels played their home games at the Dean Smith Center in Chapel Hill, North Carolina as members of the Atlantic Coast Conference.

The Tar Heels finished the season 14–19, and 6–14 in ACC play. They defeated Virginia Tech in the first round of the ACC tournament before losing to Syracuse in the second round. The tournament was cancelled before the quarterfinals due to the COVID-19 pandemic. The NCAA tournament and NIT were also cancelled due to the pandemic.

== Previous season ==
The Tar Heels finished the season 29–7, 16–2 in ACC play to finish tied for the regular season conference championship with eventual NCAA tournament champions Virginia. As the No. 2 seed in the ACC tournament, they advanced to the semifinals before ultimately losing to Duke. They received an at-large bid to the NCAA Tournament as the No. 1 seed in the Midwest region, where they advanced to the Sweet Sixteen before losing to Auburn.

== Offseason ==
=== Departures ===
Name	Number	Pos.	Height	Weight	Year	Hometown	Notes
Seventh Woods	0	G	6'2"	185	Junior	Columbia, South Carolina	Transferred to South Carolina
Coby White	2	G	6'5"	185	Freshman	Goldsboro, North Carolina	Declared for the 2019 NBA draft; selected 7th overall by the Chicago Bulls.
Nassir Little	5	G/F	6'6"	220	Freshman	Orange Park, Florida	Declared for the 2019 NBA draft; selected 25th overall by the Portland Trail Blazers.
Cameron Johnson	13	G	6'9"	210	Senior	Moon Township, Pennsylvania	Graduated; selected 11th overall by the Minnesota Timberwolves.
Kenny Williams	24	G	6'4"	185	Senior	Midlothian, Virginia	Graduated
Luke Maye	32	F	6'8"	240	Senior	Huntersville, North Carolina	Graduated

=== 2019 recruiting class ===
College recruiting
Name	Hometown	School	Height	Weight	Commit date
Jeremiah Francis; PG	Pickerington, Ohio	Pickerington Central	6 ft 3 in (1.91 m)	190 lb (86 kg)	Aug 11, 2017
Jeremiah Francis; PG	Recruit ratings: Rivals: 247Sports: ESPN: (80)				
Armando Bacot; C	Richmond, Virginia	IMG Academy (FL)	6 ft 10 in (2.08 m)	240 lb (110 kg)	Aug 16, 2018
Armando Bacot; C	Recruit ratings: Rivals: 247Sports: ESPN: (94)				
Cole Anthony; PG	Portland, Oregon	Oak Hill Academy (VA)	6 ft 3 in (1.91 m)	185 lb (84 kg)	Apr 23, 2019
Cole Anthony; PG	Recruit ratings: Rivals: 247Sports: ESPN: (96)				
Anthony Harris; CG	Fairfax, Virginia	Paul VI High School	6 ft 4 in (1.93 m)	180 lb (82 kg)	Apr 23, 2019
Anthony Harris; CG	Recruit ratings: Rivals: 247Sports: ESPN: (84)				
Overall recruit ranking: Rivals: #11 247Sports: #8 ESPN: #9
Note: In many cases, Scout, Rivals, 247Sports, On3, and ESPN may conflict in their listings of height and weight.; In these cases, the average was taken. ESPN grades are on a 100-point scale.; Sources:

=== Incoming transfers ===
Name	Pos.	Height	Weight	Year	Hometown	Notes
Christian Keeling	G	6'4"	175	Graduate Student	Augusta, GA	Graduate Transfer from Charleston Southern University
Justin Pierce	G/F	6'7"	215	Graduate Student	Glen Ellyn, Ill	Graduate Transfer from the College of William & Mary

== Roster ==
2019–20 North Carolina Tar Heels men's basketball team
Players
Coaches

Pos.	#	Name	Height	Weight	Year	Previous school	Hometown
G	0	Anthony Harris (injured)	6 ft 4 in (1.93 m)	190 lb (86 kg)	Fr	Paul VI High School	Fairfax, Virginia
G	1	Leaky Black	6 ft 8 in (2.03 m)	195 lb (88 kg)	So	Concord High School	Concord, North Carolina
G	2	Cole Anthony	6 ft 3 in (1.91 m)	190 lb (86 kg)	Fr	Oak Hill Academy (VA)	New York, New York
G	3	Andrew Platek	6 ft 4 in (1.93 m)	200 lb (91 kg)	Jr	Northfield Mount Hermon (MA)	Schenectady, New York
G	4	Brandon Robinson	6 ft 5 in (1.96 m)	173 lb (78 kg)	Sr	Douglas County High School	Douglasville, Georgia
C	5	Armando Bacot	6 ft 10 in (2.08 m)	232 lb (105 kg)	Fr	IMG Academy (FL)	Richmond, Virginia
F	11	Shea Rush (W)	6 ft 5 in (1.96 m)	210 lb (95 kg)	Sr	The Barstow School	Kansas City, Missouri
G	13	Jeremiah Francis	6 ft 0 in (1.83 m)	210 lb (95 kg)	Fr	Pickerington Central High School	Pickerington, Ohio
F	15	Garrison Brooks	6 ft 9 in (2.06 m)	235 lb (107 kg)	Jr	Auburn High School	LaFayette, Alabama
C	21	Sterling Manley (injured)	6 ft 11 in (2.11 m)	250 lb (113 kg)	Jr	Pickerington Central High School	Pickerington, Ohio
F	22	Walker Miller (W)	6 ft 10 in (2.08 m)	230 lb (104 kg)	Jr	New Hampton School (NH)	Greensboro, North Carolina
G	25	Caleb Ellis (W)	6 ft 5 in (1.96 m)	190 lb (86 kg)	Sr	Cary Christian School	Apex, North Carolina
G	30	K. J. Smith	6 ft 2 in (1.88 m)	175 lb (79 kg)	RS Jr	IMG Academy (FL)	Thousand Oaks, California
G/F	32	Justin Pierce	6 ft 7 in (2.01 m)	210 lb (95 kg)	GS	College of William & Mary	Glen Ellyn, IL
G	34	Robbie O'Han (W)	6 ft 2 in (1.88 m)	170 lb (77 kg)	Sr	St. David's School	Raleigh, North Carolina
F	35	Ryan McAdoo (W)	6 ft 5 in (1.96 m)	205 lb (93 kg)	RS So	Saint Andrew's School	Boca Raton, Florida
C	42	Brandon Huffman	6 ft 10 in (2.08 m)	255 lb (116 kg)	Jr	Word of God Christian Academy	Goldsboro, North Carolina
G	55	Christian Keeling	6 ft 3 in (1.91 m)	180 lb (82 kg)	GS	Charleston Southern	Augusta, Georgia

Head coach

- Roy Williams (North Carolina)

Assistant coach(es)

- Steve Robinson (Radford)
- Hubert Davis (North Carolina)
- Brad Frederick (North Carolina)

Legend

- (C) Team captain
- (S) Suspended
- (I) Ineligible
- (W) Walk-on
- Injured
- Current redshirt

Roster

== Schedule and results ==
Date time, TV	Rank^{#}	Opponent^{#}	Result	Record	High points	High rebounds	High assists	Site (attendance) city, state
Exhibition
November 1, 2019*; 7:30 pm, ACCNX	No. 9	Winston-Salem State	W 96–61	–	18 – Brooks	11 – Brooks	7 – Tied	Dean Smith Center (20,285); Chapel Hill, NC
Regular season
November 6, 2019; 7:00 pm, ACCN	No. 9	Notre Dame	W 76–65	1–0 (1–0)	34 – Anthony	11 – Anthony	5 – Tied	Dean Smith Center (21,750); Chapel Hill, NC
November 8, 2019*; 7:00 pm, FloSports	No. 9	at UNC Wilmington	W 78–62	2–0	20 – Anthony	12 – Tied	4 – Platek	Trask Coliseum (5,100); Wilmington, NC
November 15, 2019*; 9:00 pm, ACCN	No. 6	Gardner–Webb	W 77–61	3–0	28 – Anthony	11 – Bacot	6 – Black	Dean Smith Center (20,374); Chapel Hill, NC
November 20, 2019*; 8:30 pm, ACCRSN	No. 5	Elon; Battle 4 Atlantis campus game	W 75–61	4–0	22 – Bacot	14 – Bacot	8 – Anthony	Dean Smith Center (20,251); Chapel Hill, NC
November 27, 2019*; 2:30 pm, ESPN	No. 6	vs. Alabama; Battle 4 Atlantis quarterfinals	W 76–67	5–0	20 – Brooks	15 – Bacot	6 – Anthony	Imperial Arena (1,405); Paradise Island, Bahamas
November 28, 2019*; 1:30 pm, ESPN	No. 6	vs. Michigan; Battle 4 Atlantis semifinals	L 64–73	5–1	22 – Anthony	8 – Brooks	4 – Robinson	Imperial Arena (1,828); Paradise Island, Bahamas
November 29, 2019*; 11:30 am, ESPN	No. 6	vs. No. 11 Oregon; Battle 4 Atlantis 3rd place game	W 78–74	6–1	23 – Bacot	12 – Bacot	4 – Robinson	Imperial Arena (2,110); Paradise Island, Bahamas
December 4, 2019*; 9:30 pm, ESPN	No. 7	No. 6 Ohio State; ACC–Big Ten Challenge	L 49–74	6–2	15 – Anthony	7 – Brooks	3 – Tied	Dean Smith Center (21,115); Chapel Hill, NC
December 8, 2019; 4:00 pm, ACCN	No. 7	at No. 5 Virginia	L 47–56	6–3 (1–1)	12 – Anthony	8 – Brooks	2 – Tied	John Paul Jones Arena (14,629); Charlottesville, VA
December 15, 2019*; 4:00 pm, ACCN	No. 17	Wofford	L 64–68	6–4	17 – Brooks	13 – Bacot	9 – Keeling	Carmichael Arena (6,272); Chapel Hill, NC
December 18, 2019*; 9:00 pm, ESPN2		at No. 2 Gonzaga	L 81–94	6–5	16 – Brooks	6 – Tied	3 – Tied	McCarthey Athletic Center (6,000); Spokane, WA
December 21, 2019*; 3:00 pm, CBS		vs. UCLA; CBS Sports Classic	W 74–64	7–5	15 – Bacot	12 – Bacot	4 – Francis	T-Mobile Arena (12,740); Paradise, NV
December 30, 2019*; 7:00 pm, ACCN		Yale	W 70–67	8–5	20 – Robinson	11 – Brooks	5 – Francis	Dean Smith Center (20,765); Chapel Hill, NC
January 4, 2020; 6:00 pm, ACCN		Georgia Tech	L 83–96	8–6 (1–2)	35 – Brooks	11 – Brooks	6 – Robinson	Dean Smith Center (21,099); Chapel Hill, NC
January 8, 2020; 7:00 pm, ACCN		Pittsburgh	L 65–73	8–7 (1–3)	21 – Brooks	10 – Brooks	4 – Bacot	Dean Smith Center (20,798); Chapel Hill, NC
January 11, 2020; 4:30 pm, ACCRSN		Clemson	L 76–79 ^{OT}	8–8 (1–4)	27 – Robinson	11 – Brooks	6 – Platek	Dean Smith Center (21,077); Chapel Hill, NC
January 18, 2020; 12:00 pm, ESPN		at Pittsburgh	L 52–66	8–9 (1–5)	16 – Brooks	13 – Brooks	4 – Platek	Peterson Events Center (12,376); Pittsburgh, PA
January 22, 2020; 8:00 pm, ACCN		at Virginia Tech	L 77–79 ^{2OT}	8–10 (1–6)	28 – Brooks	13 – Brooks	6 – Brooks	Cassell Coliseum (9,275); Blacksburg, VA
January 25, 2020; 12:00 pm, ESPN2		Miami (FL)	W 94–71	9–10 (2–6)	29 – Robinson	12 – Bacot	7 – Bacot	Dean Smith Center (21,125); Chapel Hill, NC
January 27, 2020; 7:00 pm, ESPN		at NC State; Rivalry	W 75–65	10–10 (3–6)	25 – Brooks	11 – Brooks	3 – Brooks	PNC Arena (19,533); Raleigh, NC
February 1, 2020; 6:00 pm, ACCN		Boston College	L 70–71	10–11 (3–7)	26 – Anthony	10 – Tied	3 – Anthony	Dean Smith Center (21,492); Chapel Hill, NC
February 3, 2020; 7:00 pm, ESPN		at No. 8 Florida State	L 59–65	10–12 (3–8)	16 – Anthony	8 – Anthony	3 – Tied	Donald L. Tucker Center (10,015); Tallahassee, FL
February 8, 2020; 6:00 pm, ESPN		No. 7 Duke; Rivalry/ESPN College GameDay	L 96–98 ^{OT}	10–13 (3–9)	24 – Anthony	11 – Anthony	9 – Black	Dean Smith Center (21,500); Chapel Hill, NC
February 11, 2020; 8:00 pm, ACCN		at Wake Forest	L 57–74	10–14 (3–10)	15 – Keeling	7 – Bacot	4 – Anthony	LJVM Coliseum (10,894); Winston-Salem, NC
February 15, 2020; 8:00 pm, ESPN		Virginia	L 62–64	10–15 (3–11)	20 – Brooks	16 – Bacot	5 – Anthony	Dean Smith Center (21,308); Chapel Hill, NC
February 17, 2020; 7:00 pm, ESPN		at Notre Dame	L 76–77	10–16 (3–12)	23 – Anthony	10 – Tied	6 – Anthony	Edmund P. Joyce Center (8,150); South Bend, IN
February 22, 2020; 4:00 pm, ESPN		at No. 11 Louisville	L 55–72	10–17 (3–13)	18 – Anthony	9 – Bacot	3 – Robinson	KFC Yum! Center (21,079); Louisville, KY
February 25, 2020; 9:00 pm, ESPN		NC State; Rivalry	W 85–79	11–17 (4–13)	30 – Brooks	9 – Brooks	5 – Anthony	Dean Smith Center (21,338); Chapel Hill, NC
February 29, 2020; 4:00 pm, ESPN		at Syracuse	W 92–79	12–17 (5–13)	26 – Brooks	14 – Brooks	7 – Anthony	Carrier Dome (29,312); Syracuse, NY
March 3, 2020; 7:00 pm, ACCN		Wake Forest	W 93–83	13–17 (6–13)	28 – Anthony	8 – Black	7 – Anthony	Dean Smith Center (21,280); Chapel Hill, NC
March 7, 2020; 6:00 pm, ESPN		at No. 12 Duke; Rivalry	L 76–89	13–18 (6–14)	26 – Brooks	13 – Brooks	3 – Anthony	Cameron Indoor Stadium (9,314); Durham, NC
ACC tournament
March 10, 2020; 7:00 pm, ACCN	(14)	vs. (11) Virginia Tech; First round	W 78–56	14–18	20 – Brooks	11 – Bacot	4 – Tied	Greensboro Coliseum (13,310); Greensboro, NC
March 11, 2020; 9:00 pm, ESPN2	(14)	vs. (6) Syracuse; Second round	L 53–81	14–19	18 – Brooks	7 – Bacot	3 – Tied	Greensboro Coliseum (20,809); Greensboro, NC
*Non-conference game. ^{#}Rankings from AP Poll. (#) Tournament seedings in parentheses. All times are in Eastern Time.

== Rankings ==
Ranking movements Legend: ██ Increase in ranking ██ Decrease in ranking — = Not ranked RV = Received votes
	Week																			
Poll	Pre	1	2	3	4	5	6	7	8	9	10	11	12	13	14	15	16	17	18	Final
AP	9	6	5	6	7	17	RV	—	—	—	—	—	—	—	—	—	—	—		Not released
Coaches	11	11*	4	4	7	16	23	RV	RV	—	—	—	—	—	—	—	—	—		

*AP does not release post-NCAA Tournament ranking
*No Coaches Poll Week 1
