= Christian Keeling =

American basketball player

- Keeling at UNC Tar Heels Camp, 2019

No. 55 – Caledonia Gladiators
- Position: Shooting guard
- League: SBL

Personal information
- Born: June 1, 1998 (age 28) Augusta, Georgia, U.S.
- Listed height: 6 ft 3 in (1.91 m)
- Listed weight: 180 lb (82 kg)

Career information
- High school: Laney (Augusta, Georgia)
- College: Charleston Southern (2016–2019); North Carolina (2019–2020)
- NBA draft: 2020: undrafted
- Playing career: 2020–present

Career history
- 2020–2021: Glasgow Rocks
- 2021–2022: BC Rustavi
- 2022–2023: Kataja BC
- 2023: Horsens IC
- 2023: KK Pelister
- 2023–2024: Köping Basket
- 2024–2025: Spartak Pleven
- 2025–2026: Helsinki Seagulls
- 2026–present: Caledonia Gladiators

Career highlights
- First-team All-Big South (2019); Second-team All-Big South (2018); Big South All-Freshman Team (2017)

Christian Anthony Keeling (born June 1, 1998) is an American basketball player for the Caledonia Gladiators of the Super Basketball League (SBL). He played college basketball for the Charleston Southern Buccaneers and the North Carolina Tar Heels.

== College career ==
=== Charleston Southern ===
As a freshman, Keeling appeared in 31 games, starting 28 of them. He was named to the Big South All-Freshman Team and was named Big South Freshman of the Week seven times throughout the course of the season. After a successful year as a sophomore, Keeling was named Second Team All-Big South and became the fifth player in league history to score 1,000 points as a sophomore. After a successful junior season for Charleston Southern in which he averaged 18.7 points per game, Keeling announced he was transferring to North Carolina as a graduate transfer.

=== North Carolina ===
Keeling became a starting guard at North Carolina as a senior. He scored nine points on 4-of-13 shooting in his first two games as a Tar Heel. As a senior, Keeling averaged 6.4 points and 2.8 rebounds per game.

== Professional career ==
Keeling joined PrimeTime Players in The Basketball Tournament 2020. He scored 25 points and had five rebounds in the 76–74 opening-round loss to Team CP3.

On December 23, 2020, Keeling signed with the Glasgow Rocks of the British Basketball League. He scored 26 points in his debut with the team four days later.

On 15 August 2025, he returned to Finland and joined Korisliiga team Helsinki Seagulls, reigning Finnish champions.

== Career statistics ==
Legend
GP	Games played	GS	Games started	MPG	Minutes per game
FG%	Field goal percentage	3P%	3-point field goal percentage	FT%	Free throw percentage
RPG	Rebounds per game	APG	Assists per game	SPG	Steals per game
BPG	Blocks per game	PPG	Points per game	**Bold**	Career high

=== College ===
Year	Team	GP	GS	MPG	FG%	3P%	FT%	RPG	APG	SPG	BPG	PPG
2016–17	Charleston Southern	31	**28**	31.2	.458	.342	.781	**7.1**	1.4	.9	.3	17.3
2017–18	Charleston Southern	28	24	**33.6**	.426	.315	**.793**	5.2	2.0	**1.3**	.4	17.6
2018–19	Charleston Southern	**34**	27	32.2	**.465**	**.380**	.778	6.9	**2.8**	**1.3**	**.7**	**18.7**
2019–20	North Carolina	33	9	19.2	.428	.320	.750	2.8	.6	.5	.2	6.4
Career		126	88	28.9	.447	.349	.781	5.5	1.7	1	.4	14.9

=== Professional ===
Year	Team	GP	GS	MPG	FG%	3P%	FT%	RPG	APG	SPG	BPG	PPG
2020–21	Glasgow Rocks	20	19	34.0	.439	.330	.839	5.5	2.9	1.0	.2	17.0
Career		20	19	34.0	.439	.330	.839	5.5	2.9	1.0	.2	17.0

== Personal life ==
Keeling's mother Deirdre died of stomach cancer during his junior year in high school. She worked three jobs to support the family. His father Curtis is an assistant coach at Mt. Eden High School, after previously serving as head coach.
