= Aidan Igiehon =

Irish basketball player (born 2000)

Dublin Lions
- Position: Forward
- League: National League

Personal information
- Born: 17 August 2000 (age 26) Dublin, Ireland
- Listed height: 6 ft 10 in (2.08 m)
- Listed weight: 245 lb (111 kg)

Career information
- High school: Moyle Park College (Clondalkin, Ireland); Lawrence Woodmere Academy (Woodmere, New York)
- College: Louisville (2019–2021); Grand Canyon (2021–2023); Abilene (2023–2024)
- NBA draft: 2024: undrafted
- Playing career: 2024–present

Career history
- 2024–present: Dublin Lions

Aidan Harris Igiehon (born 17 August 2000) is an Irish professional basketball player for the Dublin Lions of the National League. He played college basketball for the Abilene Christian Wildcats, the Grand Canyon Antelopes and the Louisville Cardinals. Igiehon attended Lawrence Woodmere Academy in New York, where he was a four-star recruit and won three state championships.

== Early life ==
Igiehon was born in the Coombe Women & Infants University Hospital in Dublin, Ireland and grew up in the nearby suburb of Clondalkin. Until he was 12 years old, he played football as a midfielder. At that age, he played basketball for the first time and stood 5 feet 6 inches (1.68 m).

In 2012, Igiehon was introduced to basketball by Dublin Lions coach Mick White, who noticed Igiehon and his friend kicking around a football outside Moyle Park College. White, who was holding under-13 tryouts and needed extra players, invited Igiehon and was impressed by him. Igiehon soon joined the Lions, with whom he learned how to play basketball and quickly improved his game. He also grew about one foot (30 cm) by the following year. In addition, Igiehon played basketball for Moyle Park College, leading his team to an All-Ireland final. In the summer of 2014, he moved to the United States to enroll at Lawrence Woodmere Academy, a K–12 private school in Woodmere, New York, as an eighth-grader. Igiehon's mother remained in Ireland, while he began living with his aunt and uncle in Brooklyn. He became a starter on his school's varsity basketball team in eighth grade.

== High school ==
Igiehon played high school basketball for Lawrence Woodmere Academy under head coach Jeff Weiss. Both Weiss and Karim Shabazz, a school physical education teacher and former professional basketball player, helped him adjust to living in the United States. Igiehon sometimes returned to Ireland to meet his mother and play for the Dublin Lions. In his freshman season, he averaged 18 points and 14 rebounds per game, leading his team to a 20-win season. Igiehon also played for the New York Lightning Amateur Athletic Union (AAU) team. In his sophomore season, he averaged 21.5 points and 15 rebounds per game, helping his team to Private Schools Athletic Association (PSAA) and New York State Association of Independent Schools (NYSAIS) Class B titles. Igiehon earned PSAA Most Valuable Player (MVP) and Class B tournament MVP honors. Following the season, he played for the New York Lightning on the Nike Elite Youth Basketball League (EYBL) circuit, averaging 6.2 points and 4.9 rebounds per game.

Igiehon missed most of December in his junior season with an ankle injury. He averaged 21 points and 18 rebounds per game, leading Lawrence Woodmere Academy to a 20–6 record, a New York State Federation Tournament appearance, and an NYSAIS Class B championship. After the season, Igiehon made his Under Armour Association debut with Team Rio, playing alongside five-star recruits Bryan Antoine and Scottie Lewis. He averaged 9.7 points and 6.4 rebounds per game. On October 19, 2018, Igiehon committed to play college basketball for Louisville over Kentucky, Oregon and St. John's. He was considered a four-star recruit by 247Sports and Rivals, and ESPN ranked him as the 36th-best player in the 2019 class. On February 24, 2019, Igiehon led Lawrence Woodmere Academy to a second straight NYSAIS Class B title and third consecutive NYSAIS championship. He also helped his team reach the Federation Tournament Class B semifinals. After averaging 26 points and 18 rebounds per game and guiding his team to a 22–2 record, Igiehon received USA Today All-USA New York first team recognition.

== College career ==
Igiehon did not see much playing time as a freshman at Louisville, partially due to an injured shoulder. As a sophomore, he was limited to five games due to a groin injury and an illness. After the season, Igiehon transferred to Grand Canyon. Igiehon spent his senior season at Abilene Christian.

== Professional career ==
Igiehon went undrafted in the 2024 NBA draft. He returned to Ireland where he joined the Dublin Lions of the second-tier National League.

== Career statistics ==
Legend
GP	Games played	GS	Games started	MPG	Minutes per game
FG%	Field goal percentage	3P%	3-point field goal percentage	FT%	Free throw percentage
RPG	Rebounds per game	APG	Assists per game	SPG	Steals per game
BPG	Blocks per game	PPG	Points per game	**Bold**	Career high

=== College ===
Year	Team	GP	GS	MPG	FG%	3P%	FT%	RPG	APG	SPG	BPG	PPG
2019–20	Louisville	**13**	0	4.7	.625	–	**.375**	1.3	.0	.0	**.2**	1.0
2020–21	Louisville	5	0	**8.2**	**.714**	–	**.375**	**1.6**	.0	**.2**	**.2**	**2.6**
Career		18	0	5.7	.667	–	.375	1.4	.0	.1	.2	1.4

== Personal life ==
Both of Igiehon's parents are originally from Lagos, Nigeria. In 2000, his mother Nibokun Omoruyi moved to Ireland, where she raised Igiehon and his older brother Brandon. In 2016, Brandon began playing NCAA Division III soccer for the State University of New York at Potsdam.
