= Jae'Lyn Withers =

American basketball player (born 2000)

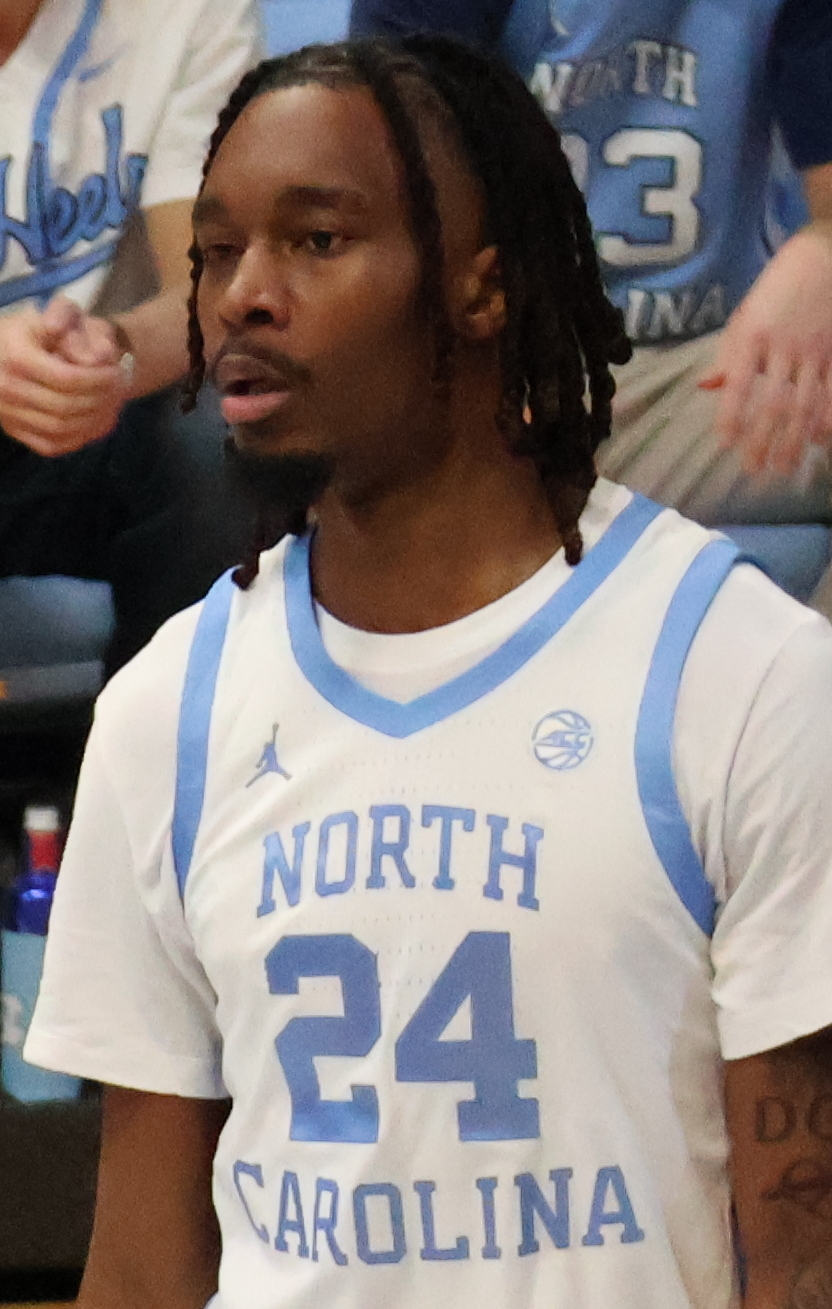
- Withers with North Carolina in 2025

Free Agent
- Position: Small forward / power forward

Personal information
- Born: December 20, 2000 (age 25) Charlotte, North Carolina, U.S.
- Listed height: 6 ft 9 in (2.06 m)
- Listed weight: 220 lb (100 kg)

Career information
- High school: North Mecklenburg (Huntersville, North Carolina); Cleveland Heights (Cleveland Heights, Ohio)
- College: Louisville (2020–2023); North Carolina (2023–2025)
- NBA draft: 2025: undrafted
- Playing career: 2025–present

Career history
- 2025–2026: Heroes Den Bosch

Career highlights
- Dutch Supercup champion (2025); ACC All-Freshman Team (2021)

Jae'Lyn Withers (born December 20, 2000) is an American professional basketball player who last played for Heroes Den Bosch of the BNXT League. He played college basketball for the North Carolina Tar Heels and the Louisville Cardinals.

== High school career ==
Withers played basketball for North Mecklenburg High School in Huntersville, North Carolina. As a junior, he averaged 20 points and 10.1 rebounds per game, earning Charlotte Observer 4A Metro Player of the Year and I-MECK Player of the Year honors. For his senior season, he transferred to Cleveland Heights High School in Cleveland Heights, Ohio. Withers averaged 19.8 points, 9.7 rebounds and 2.2 blocks per game as a senior. He competed for Team Loaded NC on the Amateur Athletic Union circuit. A consensus four-star recruit, Withers committed to playing college basketball for Louisville over offers from Arizona, Florida, Texas and Texas A&M.

== College career ==
Withers redshirted his first season at Louisville to focus on gaining strength and weight. On November 29, 2020, he recorded a freshman season-high 20 points and nine rebounds in an 86–64 win over Prairie View A&M. As a freshman, Withers averaged 10.1 points and 7.7 rebounds per game, earning Atlantic Coast Conference (ACC) All-Freshman Team honors.

He started 15 out of 29 games his sophomore season, averaging 5.8 points per game and was second on the team in rebounding with 4.6 per game. In his junior year, he started 29 out of 32 games on the season and averaged 8.9 points and 5.3 rebounds per game. He led the Cardinals with a 41.7% three-point percentage.

Following the season, he entered his name into the NCAA's transfer portal. Withers would ultimately choose to return to his home state and decided to transfer to North Carolina.

== Professional career ==
On July 30, 2025, he signed with Heroes Den Bosch of the BNXT League.

== Career statistics ==
Legend
GP	Games played	GS	Games started	MPG	Minutes per game
FG%	Field goal percentage	3P%	3-point field goal percentage	FT%	Free throw percentage
RPG	Rebounds per game	APG	Assists per game	SPG	Steals per game
BPG	Blocks per game	PPG	Points per game	**Bold**	Career high

=== College ===
Year	Team	GP	GS	MPG	FG%	3P%	FT%	RPG	APG	SPG	BPG	PPG
2019–20	Louisville	Redshirt										
2020–21	Louisville	20	20	**25.7**	**.552**	.381	.679	**7.7**	.5	**.9**	.4	**10.1**
2021–22	Louisville	29	15	18.2	.410	.234	.667	4.6	.6	.7	.4	5.8
2022–23	Louisville	32	**29**	25.2	.433	**.417**	.735	5.3	**.8**	.7	.4	8.9
2023–24	UNC	37	3	12.4	.535	.200	.714	5.3	**.8**	.4	.1	6.1
2024–25	UNC	**9**	7	21.2	.405	.333	**.780**	3.6	.6	.4	**.5**	4.2
Career		127	74	19.6	.467	.333	.722	5.0	.6	.6	.4	6.8

== Personal life ==
Withers was born when his father, Curtis, was 16 years old and a high school sophomore. Curtis played college basketball at Charlotte, where he was an all-conference player, before embarking on a professional career in the NBA Development League and overseas.
