= Tayo Ogedengbe =

British basketball player (born 1987)

No. 15 – Surrey Scorchers
- Position: Forward / guard
- League: British Basketball League

Personal information
- Born: 15 May 1987 (age 39) Hammersmith, England
- Listed height: 6 ft 4 in (1.93 m)
- Listed weight: 210 lb (95 kg)

Career information
- College: Temple University
- NBA draft: 2009: undrafted
- Playing career: 2007–present

Career history
- 2007–2008: London Capital
- 2008–2009: Canarias Basketball Academy
- 2009–2012: Guildford Heat
- 2012–2013: London Lions
- 2013–2014: Calais Basket Cheminots
- 2014–2015: Glasgow Rocks
- 2015–2024: Surrey Scorchers
- 2024- present: Surrey 89ers

Omotayo Ogedengbe (born 12 May 1987) is a British professional basketball player who currently plays for the Surrey Scorchers in the British Basketball League.

== Early life ==
Ogedenbge began playing basketball aged 17 for local team the Ealing Tornados. After winning the Under-18 conference, he was selected to play for the England U18 national team.

== College career ==
After his performances for Ealing Tornados, he was rewarded with a half-scholarship to Temple University in Philadelphia, but returned after three months to debut for the London Towers.

== Professional career ==
In 2007, Ogedenge joined British Basketball League team London Capital and averaged 7.3 points per game in his debut season. He then moved to Spain for a year to join the Grand Canaries Basketball Academy.

Ogedenge returned to England in 2009, and made 117 appearances over three seasons with the Guildford Heat. He later joined the London Lions for the 2012–13 season.

In 2013, he joined French team Calais Basket Cheminots and was selected for French National All-Star game. Upon returning to England once again, Ogedenge joined the Glasgow Rocks for a single season and averaged 15.3 points per game.

A year later, he became the first ever signing for the Surrey Scorchers. He was later named captain and has become the franchise's longest serving player.
