= Jimbo Lull =

American basketball player (born 1996)

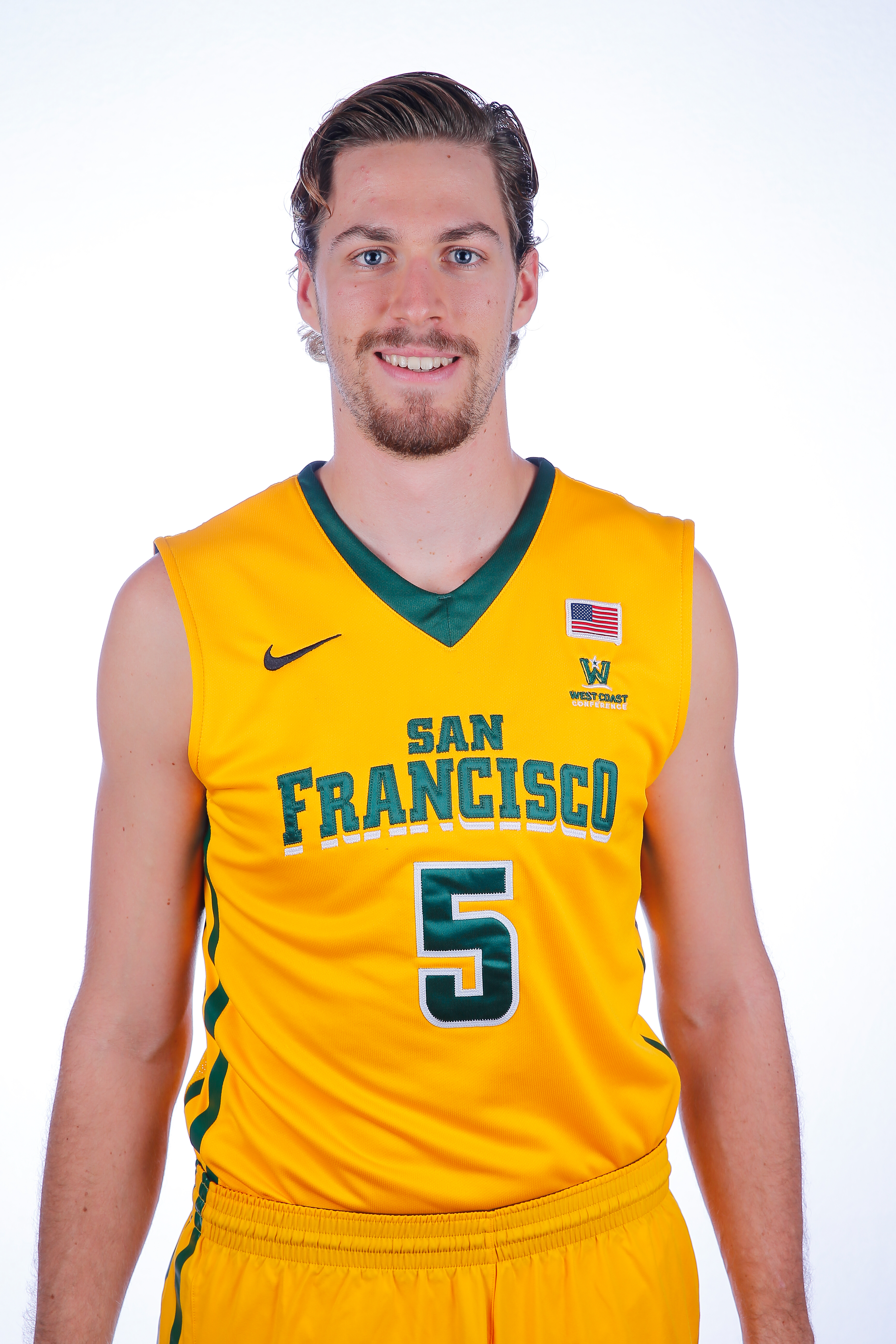

Raiffeisen Flyers Wels
- Position: Center
- League: Austrian Basketball Superliga

Personal information
- Born: August 2, 1996 (age 30) Manhattan Beach, California, U.S.
- Listed height: 7 ft 0 in (2.13 m)
- Listed weight: 252 lb (114 kg)

Career information
- High school: Rolling Hills (San Pedro, California); New Hampton School (New Hampton, New Hampshire)
- College: San Francisco (2016–2020)
- NBA draft: 2020: undrafted
- Playing career: 2020–present

Career history
- 2020: Ionikos Nikaias
- 2020: Sloboda Užice
- 2020–2021: Cheshire Phoenix
- 2021: Edmonton Stingers
- 2021–present: Flyers Wels

James Richard Lull (born August 2, 1996) is an American professional basketball player for Flyers Wels of the Austrian Basketball Superliga. He played college basketball for San Francisco.

== High school career ==
Lull grew up in Manhattan Beach, California and focused on surfing before turning his attention to basketball. He attended Rolling Hills Preparatory School in San Pedro, California for three years. As a sophomore, Lull averaged 18.8 points and 12.8 rebounds per game, helping the Huskies reach the Southern Section 5A championship game. He averaged 15.4 points, 12.3 rebounds and 3.0 blocks per game as a junior. Lull transferred to New Hampton School for his senior year and also a postgraduate year. He committed to San Francisco in November 2015.

== College career ==
Lull came off the bench for his first two seasons at San Francisco. Following his sophomore season, he improved his conditioning by running up mountains in New Hampshire. As a junior, Lull averaged 8.5 points and 5.3 rebounds per game. On November 30, 2019, Lull scored a career-high 24 points and grabbed 10 rebounds in an 85–75 loss to Hawaii. He averaged 11.9 points and 7.6 rebounds per game as a senior. Lull was named Honorable Mention All-West Coast Conference.

== Professional career ==
Lull signed his first professional contract with Ionikos Nikaias of the Greek Basket League on September 24, 2020. After being tested by the team and appearing in two cup games, he signed with Sloboda Užice of the Basketball League of Serbia. He averaged 7.5 points and 4.5 rebounds per game. On December 2, 2020, Lull signed a one-season contract with Cheshire Phoenix of the British Basketball League (BBL). He averaged 12.8 points, 6.9 rebounds, and 1.0 assist per game. Lull joined the Edmonton Stingers of the Canadian Elite Basketball League in 2021. He averaged 3.5 points and 1.3 rebounds per game in four games. On September 27, 2021, Lull signed with Flyers Wels of the Austrian Basketball Superliga.

== Career statistics ==
Legend
| GP | Games played | GS | Games started | MPG | Minutes per game |
| FG% | Field goal percentage | 3P% | 3-point field goal percentage | FT% | Free throw percentage |
| RPG | Rebounds per game | APG | Assists per game | SPG | Steals per game |
| BPG | Blocks per game | PPG | Points per game | **Bold** | Career high |

=== College ===
| Year | Team | GP | GS | MPG | FG% | 3P% | FT% | RPG | APG | SPG | BPG | PPG |
|---|---|---|---|---|---|---|---|---|---|---|---|---|
| 2016–17 | San Francisco | 32 | 6 | 12.5 | .571 | .231 | .727 | 2.4 | .5 | .3 | .3 | 3.6 |
| 2017–18 | San Francisco | 31 | 1 | 11.0 | .566 | .083 | .656 | 3.0 | .3 | .2 | .6 | 4.3 |
| 2018–19 | San Francisco | 31 | 29 | 19.2 | **.604** | .000 | .729 | 5.3 | .7 | .2 | .5 | 8.5 |
| 2019–20 | San Francisco | **34** | **34** | **28.1** | .569 | **.323** | **.755** | **7.6** | **1.1** | **.6** | **.8** | **11.9** |
| Career | | 128 | 70 | 17.9 | .579 | .246 | .730 | 4.6 | .6 | .3 | .5 | 7.2 |
