= Justin Gordon (basketball) =

American basketball player (born 1993)

No. 24 – TFT
- Position: Small forward
- League: Macedonian League

Personal information
- Born: December 20, 1993 (age 32) Charlotte, North Carolina
- Listed height: 198 cm (6 ft 6 in)
- Listed weight: 205 lb (93 kg)

Career information
- High school: Northside Christian Academy (Charlotte, North Carolina)
- College: Wofford (2012–2016)
- NBA draft: 2016: undrafted
- Playing career: 2016–present

Career history
- 2016–2017: Sandringham Sabres
- 2017–2018: Amal Essaouira
- 2018–2019: Feyenoord
- 2019–2020: PS Karlsruhe Lions
- 2020–2021: Newcastle Eagles
- 2021–2022: PVSK Panthers
- 2022–2023: Newcastle Eagles
- 2023-2024: Oliveirense Basquetebol
- 2024-2025: Steaua București
- 2025: MBK SPU Nitra
- 2025-present: TFT

Career highlights
- BBL Cup winner (2021); BBL Cup Final MVP (2021)

Justin Windell Gordon (born December 20, 1993) is an American basketball player for the TFT of the Macedonian League. He played college basketball for the Wofford Terriers.

== Career ==
=== Australia ===
Gordon made his professional debut with Australian side Sandringham Sabres of the South East Australian Basketball League, in the 2016–17 season.

=== Morocco ===
The following season, Gordon played in Morocco with Amal Essaouira.

=== Feyenoord ===
In August 2018, Gordon signed a one-year contract with Feyenoord Basketbal of the Dutch Basketball League (DBL). On October 6, he had a team-high 13 points and 11 rebounds in his DBL debut, in an 86–57 loss to Den Bosch. Gordon ended the season as the DBL's third leading scorer, with 17.6 points per game for Feyenoord.

=== PS Karlsruhe Lions ===
On July 5, 2019, Gordon signed with PS Karlsruhe Lions of the German ProA.

=== Newcastle Eagles ===
On September 6, 2020, Gordon joined BBL side Newcastle Eagles as part of the 2020–2021 roster. On January 24, 2021, they won the BBL Cup beating London Lions 84–77. Gordon picked up the Cup Final MVP honours finishing with 18 points, 15 rebounds, three assists and three blocks.

=== PVSK Panthers ===
On May 31, 2021, he has signed with Limburg United of the Pro Basketball League. Before the start of the competition, Gordon and Limburg parted ways. On September 24, he signed with the PVSK Panthers of the Nemzeti Bajnokság I/A.
