= Kevin Ware =

American basketball player (born 1993)

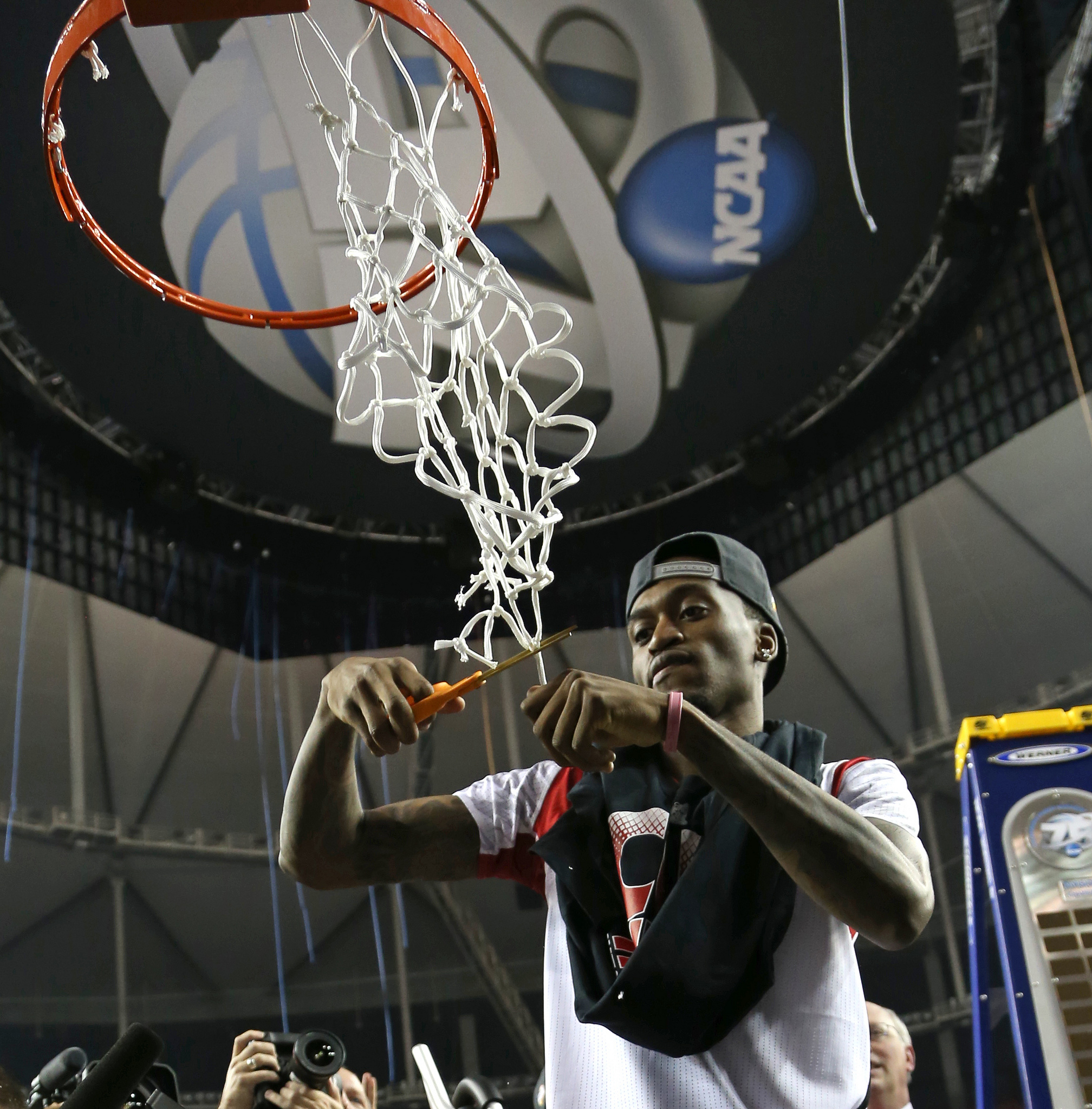
- Kevin Ware cuts a net after Louisville's victory in the 2013 NCAA championship game.

Free agent
- Position: Point guard / shooting guard

Personal information
- Born: January 3, 1993 (age 33) Bronx, New York, U.S.
- Listed height: 6 ft 5 in (1.96 m)
- Listed weight: 175 lb (79 kg)

Career information
- High school: Rockdale County (Conyers, Georgia)
- College: Louisville (2011–2014); Georgia State (2014–2016)
- NBA draft: 2017: undrafted
- Playing career: 2017–present

Career history
- 2017: Kauhajoen Karhu
- 2017–2018: Brno
- 2018–2019: Faros Larissas
- 2019: London Lightning
- 2020: Korihait
- 2020–2021: London Lions
- 2021: Novi Pazar
- 2022: Al Naft Baghdad
- 2022: Club Deportivo Hispano Americano
- 2023: Correbasket UAT

Career highlights
- NCAA champion (2013)*; Sun Belt tournament MVP (2015); *Later vacated

Kevin Ware Jr. (born January 3, 1993) is an American professional basketball player. He is a former player for the University of Louisville. Ware received widespread media attention when he suffered an open fracture of the tibia in his right leg during an Elite Eight game against the Duke Blue Devils on March 31, 2013. He had also represented Jordan at the 2022 Arab Basketball Championship.

== Early life ==
Ware was born on January 3, 1993, in Bronx, New York, to Lisa Junior and Kevin Ware Sr. Ware grew up with three sisters: Donna, Brittney, and Khadijah. Ware and his family moved to Atlanta when he was 14, but shortly after, they moved to Rockdale County, Georgia, so the family could live in "more of a quiet area." Scout and Rivals.com both listed Ware as a four-star prospect out of a possible five stars, while ESPN gave him a 92/100 rating. He had a broken hand in July 2010. Ware had signed a letter-of-intent with Tennessee, but changed his mind after Bruce Pearl was fired as Tennessee's basketball coach. His choices were down to Georgia and Louisville before picking the Cardinals.

== College career ==
In his freshman season, Ware played limited minutes. In his sophomore year, his minutes began to increase as Louisville's first guard off the bench to relieve Peyton Siva or Russ Smith. Ware had disciplinary issues, however, and Rick Pitino suspended him for a game against Pittsburgh. After his return, Ware's production and minutes increased for the remainder of the season. In consecutive games in the NCAA tournament, Ware dished a career high 5 assists against Colorado State, then scored a career high 11 points against Oregon.

=== Injury ===
On March 31, 2013, in the first half of an Elite 8 game against Duke, Ware landed awkwardly on his right leg after attempting to block a shot, causing an open fracture which protruded several inches out of his shin. Players and coaches on both teams were visibly shaken at the sight of the injury. While lying on the floor of the court, Ware repeatedly said, "I'm fine, just win the game." After being tended to courtside for several minutes, Ware was carried off on a stretcher and was taken by ambulance to Methodist Hospital of Indianapolis. Surgeons inserted a rod into his tibia in a two-hour operation. In a performance the players dedicated to Ware, Louisville beat Duke 85–63. As the game concluded, Louisville forward Chane Behanan wore Ware's jersey in a show of solidarity for his teammate.

Many NBA players showed their support for Ware and shared their sympathies through Twitter. Former NFL quarterback Joe Theismann and the Louisville Cardinals former running back Michael Bush, who both have gone through the same kind of injury, called to give their support. Ware traveled with the team to the Final Four in Atlanta, where he sat alongside his teammates as they won the national championship game (which was later vacated due to the 2015 sex scandal).

=== 2013–14 season ===
Ware returned to competitive basketball for the first time during an exhibition game against the University of Pikeville, entering the game midway through the second half. Ware received a standing ovation upon entering the game, and another after making his first shot, finishing with six points and four rebounds. He played in nine games that season.

Ware announced that he would redshirt the 2013–2014 season in order to continue his recovery. He later decided to transfer in order to "move on," and move to a school closer to the state of Georgia such as Tennessee, Georgia State, or Auburn.

On April 12, 2014, Ware officially transferred to Georgia State University. He started the 2014–15 season with two years of eligibility, and the NCAA granted Ware a waiver from its rule requiring transfers to sit out a year. Ware was named the Most Valuable Player of the 2015 Sun Belt Conference men's basketball tournament in which he led Georgia State to victory in the championship game, earning GSU a ticket to the NCAA tournament where they upset third seeded Baylor in the first round, before falling to Xavier in the second round.

== Professional career ==
On November 25, 2016, Ware signed with the Czech team BC Brno, after having started the season with the Finnish team Kauhajoen Karhu.

On July 30, 2017, Ware joined Faros Larissas of the Greek Basket League. Ware averaged 12.4 points, 4.5 rebounds and 1.8 assists for Faros Larissas. He signed with the London Lightning of the National Basketball League of Canada on August 29, 2018.

On August 12, 2020, Ware signed with the London Lions for the 2020–21 BBL season. He joined Novi Pazar of the Serbian league in 2021, averaging 15.6 points, 4.4 rebounds, 5.8 assists and 2.8 steals per game. On January 3, 2022, Ware signed with Al Naft Baghdad of the Iraqi Basketball League.
