= Fahro Alihodžić =

Bosnian-British basketball player

No. 25 – Sheffield Sharks
- Position: Center
- League: SLB

Personal information
- Born: 25 August 1989 (age 37) Vlasenica, SFR Yugoslavia
- Listed height: 6 ft 10 in (2.08 m)
- Listed weight: 260 lb (118 kg)

Career information
- High school: St. Francis de Sales (Toledo, Ohio)
- College: Fordham (2009–2011); Southeastern CC (2011–2012); UAB (2012–2014)
- NBA draft: 2014: undrafted
- Playing career: 2014–present

Career history
- 2014: Kaposvári
- 2014–2015: Rethymno
- 2015: Estudiantes Concordia
- 2015–2016: Promitheas Patras
- 2016–2017: Panionios
- 2017–2018: Leuven Bears
- 2018–2020: Sigal Prishtina
- 2020–2021: London Lions
- 2021–2022: Charilaos Trikoupis
- 2022–2023: Bashkimi Prizren
- 2023–2025: Caledonia Gladiators
- 2025–2026: Prievidza
- 2026-present: Sheffield Sharks

Career highlights
- BBL Trophy champion (2023); Greek 2nd Division champion (2017)

Fahro Alihodžić (born 25 August 1989) is a Bosnian-British professional basketball player who plays for Sheffield Sharks of the Super League Basketball. He also represents the Great Britain national basketball team internationally.

== High school career ==
Alihodžić played high school basketball at St. Francis de Sales High School, in Toledo, Ohio.

== College career ==
Alihodžić played college basketball at Fordham from 2009 to 2011 in the Atlantic 10 Conference, and one year at Southeastern Iowa Community College from 2011 to 2012. Competed for most winningest program in Junior College History. In only season with the Blackhawks, Alihodžić averaged 15.2 points and 7.5 rebounds per game, while shooting a team-leading 68-percent (97-of-142) from the floor. Then moved on to play two years at University of Alabama at Birmingham in ConferenceUSA from 2012 to 2014. In Season (2012–13) he was named team Defensive player of the year. Team's third-leading scorer with 9.7 points and 4.5 rebounds per game ... UAB's second-best free-throw shooter with an 80-percent (64-of-80) mark from the line. Put in 15 points and grabbed five offensive rebounds vs. UCF. Came off the bench and netted a career-high 18 points on 7-of-11 shooting vs. SMU. Scored all nine of his points in the second half at Tulane. grabbed a career-high nine rebounds and added eight points vs. Marshall. Went 5-of-7 from the field netting 12 points and grabbing seven boards vs. Southern Miss. Produced a strong overall game vs. UTEP with 12 points, eight rebounds, four assists and three blocks. Recorded 12 points in a season-high 33 minutes vs. Georgia Southern. Poured in 17 points on 8-of-12 shooting vs. South Alabama. At UAB (2013–14) Season was the only player to start every game of the season. Along with another successful winning season, he was the team's fourth-leading scorer and the team's second best rebounder with 8.8 points and 6.3 rebounds per game ...put in 14 points and grabbed 12 rebounds vs. Rutgers for the win. Scored 8 points and team-high 13 rebounds vs. ranked opponent University of North Carolina. Netted 16 points and 6 rebounds vs Big Ten opponent Nebraska for the win. Another double double with 10 points and 10 rebounds vs. Troy. Went 7-of-12 from the field netting 14 points and grabbing seven boards vs. Newberry College. Produced a strong overall game vs. UTSA with 17 pts, four rebounds, and four blocks. .

== Professional career ==
After going undrafted in the 2014 NBA draft, Alihodžić began his pro career in the Hungarian League with Kaposvári in 2014. In 3 games he got averaged 6 points, 5.7 rebounds, 2.3 steals and 1.3 blocks per game. He left the team on November due to club financial problems and joined Rethymno of the Greek Basket League. In 9 games averaged 4.7 points and 2.3 rebounds per game including a very impressive performance vs AEK Athens scoring 16 points 8/11 7 rebounds in 17 minutes. On 30 January 2015, he signed with Estudiantes Concordia in Argentina LigaA for the rest of the season. In 14 games averaging 8 points and 4.1 rebounds per game.

On 13 September 2015, Alihodžić moved to the Greek A2 Basket League club Promitheas Patras. With the club, he won the promotion to the Greek Basket League, after Promitheas finished third in the regular season then losing in the A2 Playoff final. Impressive year in his career with A2 Honorable Mention, in 29 games averaging 10.6 points (team 3rd leading scorer) and team leading rebounder with 6.2 rebounds.

On 5 August 2016, Alihodzic signed a two-year deal with Panionios.

On 22 October 2020, Alihodžić signed with the London Lions for the 2020–21 BBL season.

On October 15, 2025, he signed with BC Prievidza of the Extraliga.

On February 17, 2026, he signed with Sheffield Sharks of the SLB.
