= Lamarr Kimble =

American basketball player (born 1996)

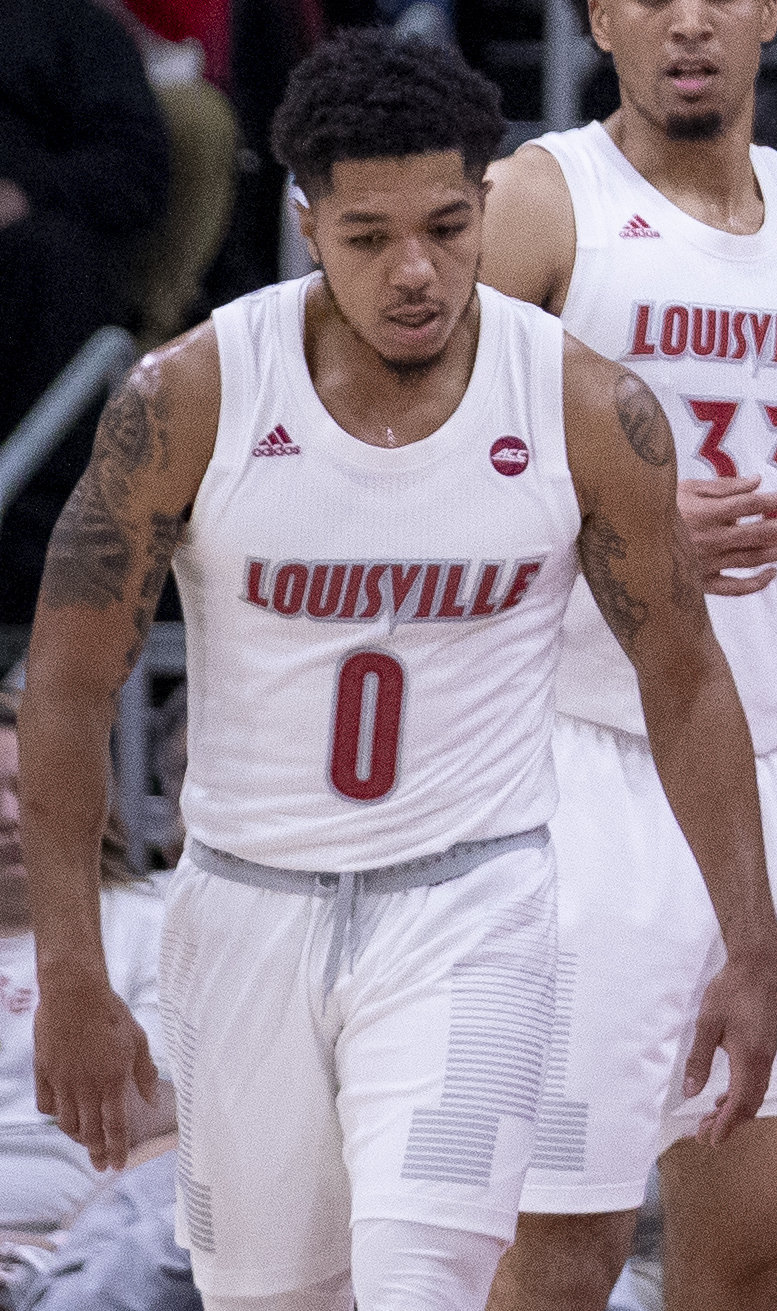
- Kimble with Louisville in December 2019

Personal information
- Born: September 28, 1996 (age 30)
- Listed height: 6 ft 0 in (1.83 m)
- Listed weight: 185 lb (84 kg)

Career information
- High school: Neumann-Goretti (Philadelphia, Pennsylvania)
- College: Saint Joseph's (2015–2019); Louisville (2019–2020)
- NBA draft: 2020: undrafted
- Playing career: 2020–present
- Position: Point guard

Career history
- 2020–2021: Worcester Wolves

Career highlights
- Atlantic 10 All-Rookie Team (2016)

Lamarr "Fresh" Kimble (born September 28, 1996) is an American professional basketball player who last played for the Worcester Wolves of the British Basketball League (BBL). He played college basketball for Saint Joseph's and Louisville.

== High school career ==
Kimble attended Saints John Neumann and Maria Goretti Catholic High School in Philadelphia, where he was teammates with Quade Green. Kimble averaged 11.4 points, 4.9 rebounds, and 4.1 assists per game as a junior. As a senior, he averaged 14.5 points per game, helping Neumann-Goretti achieve a 28–2 record and its second straight PIAA Class AAA state championship. Kimble earned first team All-Catholic League, Pennsylvania Sportswriters All-State Class AAA and All-USA Pennsylvania honors. He signed with Saint Joseph's out of high school.

== College career ==
As a freshman, Kimble averaged 6.0 points and 2.5 assists per game to help St. Josephs finish 28–8 and reach the second round of the NCAA Tournament. He was named to the Atlantic 10 All-Rookie Team. As a sophomore, Kimble averaged 15.5 points and 4.5 assists per game, sixth best in the Atlantic 10, but missed the final seven games of the season after injuring the fifth metatarsal of his left foot. In the first game of the 2017–18 season, Kimble scored 10 points against Toledo but re-injured his foot, forcing him to miss the remainder of the season. Kimble averaged 15.6 points, 3.6 rebounds and 2.8 assists per game as a redshirt junior, but struggled with his three-point shooting, hitting 29 percent of his attempts. He missed 10 games with a hand injury but earned Second Team All-Philadelphia Big 5 honors. The team finished 14–19, and Kimble opted to transfer for his final season of eligibility after St. Joseph's fired coach Phil Martelli. After receiving interest from several schools, Kimble transferred to Louisville due to his familiarity with assistant coach Luke Murray and the success of graduate transfer Christen Cunningham the previous season. According to ESPN, Kimble was the 10th best transfer. As a senior at Louisville, Kimble averaged 5.0 points, 2.7 assists, and 1.5 rebounds per game.

== Professional career ==
On August 25, 2020, Kimble signed his first professional contract with the Worcester Wolves of the British Basketball League.

== Personal life ==
Kimble is a distant relative of former NBA player Bo Kimble.
