= 2019–20 Rhode Island Rams men's basketball team =

American college basketball season

2019–20 Rhode Island Rams men's basketball
- Conference: Atlantic 10 Conference
- Record: 21–9 (13–5 A-10)
- Head coach: David Cox (2nd season)
- Assistant coaches: T. J. Buchanan; Austin Carroll; Kevin Sutton
- Home arena: Ryan Center

2019–20 Atlantic 10 men's basketball standings
	Conf.				Overall
Team	W		L	PCT	W		L	PCT
No. 3 Dayton	18	–	0	1.000	29	–	2	.935
Richmond	14	–	4	.778	24	–	7	.774
Rhode Island	13	–	5	.722	21	–	9	.700
Saint Louis	12	–	6	.667	23	–	8	.742
St. Bonaventure	11	–	7	.611	19	–	12	.613
Duquesne	11	–	7	.611	21	–	9	.700
Davidson	10	–	8	.556	16	–	14	.533
Massachusetts	8	–	10	.444	14	–	17	.452
VCU	8	–	10	.444	18	–	13	.581
La Salle	6	–	12	.333	15	–	15	.500
George Washington	6	–	12	.333	12	–	20	.375
George Mason	5	–	13	.278	17	–	15	.531
Saint Joseph's	2	–	16	.111	6	–	26	.188
Fordham	2	–	16	.111	9	–	22	.290
Note: The 2020 A-10 tournament was canceled after the first round due to the COVID-19 pandemic. Rankings from AP poll

The 2019–20 Rhode Island Rams basketball team represented the University of Rhode Island during the 2019–20 NCAA Division I men's basketball season. The Rams, led by second-year head coach David Cox, played their home games at the Ryan Center in Kingston, Rhode Island as members of the Atlantic 10 Conference. They finished the season 21–9, 13–5 in A-10 play to finish in third place. Their season ended with the A-10 tournament and all other postseason tournaments were canceled due to the ongoing coronavirus pandemic.

== Previous season ==
The Rams finished the 2018–19 season 18–15, 9–9 in A-10 play to finish in ninth place. They defeated La Salle and VCU to advance to the semifinals of the A-10 tournament where they lost to St. Bonaventure.

== Offseason ==
=== Departures ===
Name	Number	Pos.	Height	Weight	Year	Hometown	Reason for departure
Will Leviton	2	G	5'8"	150	Senior	Providence, RI	Walk-on; graduated
Ryan Preston	5	G	6'6"	195	Senior	Brooklyn, NY	Graduated
Omar Silverio	15	G	6'4"	190	Freshman	Bronx, NY	Transferred to Hofstra
Mike Layssard Jr.	21	F	6'9"	255	Junior	Lena, LA	Left the team for personal reasons
Christion Thompson	25	G	6'4"	190	RS Junior	Baton Rouge, LA	Graduate transferred to Tulane
Nicola Akele	45	F	6'7"	215	Senior	Treviso, Italy	Graduated
Michael Tertsea	55	C	6'10"	230	RS Sophomore	Makurdi, Nigeria	Transferred to Gannon
Dana Tate	12	F	6'7"	230	Sophomore	Boston, MA	Transferred to Siena
Gregory Hammond	22	G	6'5"	200	Freshman	New Orleans, LA	Transferred to UMass-Lowell

=== Incoming transfers ===
Name	Number	Pos.	Height	Weight	Year	Hometown	Previous School
Jeremy Sheppard	2	G	6'1"	160	Junior	Richmond, VA	Junior college transferred from College of Central Florida. Sheppard is not eligible for the 2019–20 season
Antwan Walker	5	F	6'9"	230	Sophomore	Washington, D.C.	Transferred from Georgetown. Under NCAA transfer rules, Walker will have to sit out for the 2019–20 season. Will have three years of remaining eligibility.
DeVale Johnson	23	F	6'7"	185	Sophomore	Brooklyn, NY	Junior college transferred from Williston State College.

=== 2019 recruiting class ===
College recruiting information
Name	Hometown	School	Height	Weight	Commit date
Mekhi Long; SF	Woodstock, VA	Massanutten Military Academy	6 ft 7 in (2.01 m)	190 lb (86 kg)	Jun 29, 2018
Mekhi Long; SF	Recruit ratings: Scout: Rivals: (80)				
Gregory Hammond; SG	New Orleans, LA	Sophie B. Wright Charter School	6 ft 5 in (1.96 m)	190 lb (86 kg)	Oct 5, 2018
Gregory Hammond; SG	Recruit ratings: Scout: Rivals: (79)				
Marial Mading; SF	Springfield, MA	Commonwealth Academy	6 ft 10 in (2.08 m)	195 lb (88 kg)	Oct 2, 2018
Marial Mading; SF	Recruit ratings: Scout: Rivals: (NR)				
Overall recruit ranking:
Note: In many cases, Scout, Rivals, 247Sports, On3, and ESPN may conflict in their listings of height and weight.; In these cases, the average was taken. ESPN grades are on a 100-point scale.; Sources: "2019 Team Ranking". Rivals.

=== 2020 recruiting class ===
College recruiting information
Name	Hometown	School	Height	Weight	Commit date
Ishmael Leggett; SG	Washington, DC	St. John's College High School	6 ft 2 in (1.88 m)	165 lb (75 kg)	Sep 19, 2019
Ishmael Leggett; SG	Recruit ratings: Scout: Rivals: (NR)				
Elijah Wood; CG	Bethesda, MD	Bethesda-Chevy Chase High School	6 ft 5 in (1.96 m)	190 lb (86 kg)	May 27, 2019
Elijah Wood; CG	Recruit ratings: Scout: Rivals: (NR)				
Overall recruit ranking:
Note: In many cases, Scout, Rivals, 247Sports, On3, and ESPN may conflict in their listings of height and weight.; In these cases, the average was taken. ESPN grades are on a 100-point scale.; Sources: "2020 Team Ranking". Rivals.

== Scholarship Tree ==
2019-2020	2020-2021	2021-2022	2022-2023	2023-2024	Key	
Jeff Dowtin	Fatts Russell	Jermaine Harris	Jacob Toppin	Ishmael Leggett		=Senior
Cyril Langevine	DJ Johnson	Tyrese Martin	Mekhi Long	Elijah Wood		=Junior
Fatts Russell	Jeremy Sheppard	Antwan Walker	Ishmael Leggett	Open		=Sophomore
DJ Johnson	Antwan Walker	Mekhi Long	Elijah Wood	Open		=Freshman
Jeremy Sheppard	Jermaine Harris	Jacob Toppin	Open	Open		
Antwan Walker	Tyrese Martin	Ishmael Leggett	Open	Open		
Jermaine Harris	Mekhi Long	Elijah Wood	Open	Open		
Tyrese Martin	Jacob Toppin	Open	Open	Open		
Mehki Long	Ishmael Leggett	Open	Open	Open		
Jacob Toppin	Elijah Wood	Open	Open	Open		
Open	Open	Open	Open	Open		
Open	Open	Open	Open	Open		
Open	Open	Open	Open	Open		

== Roster ==
2019–20 Rhode Island Rams men's basketball team
Players
Coaches

Pos.	#	Name	Height	Weight	Year	Previous school	Hometown
F	0	Jermaine Harris	6 ft 8 in (2.03 m)	230 lb (104 kg)	So	Rock Creek Christian	Upper Marlboro, MD
G	1	Fatts Russell	5 ft 10 in (1.78 m)	165 lb (75 kg)	Jr	Imhotep Institute	Philadelphia, PA
G	2	Jeremy Sheppard	6 ft 1 in (1.85 m)	165 lb (75 kg)	RS Jr	John Marshall; Williston State College	Richmond, VA
G	4	Tyrese Martin	6 ft 6 in (1.98 m)	205 lb (93 kg)	So	Massanutten Military Academy	Allentown, PA
F	5	Antwan Walker	6 ft 7 in (2.01 m)	230 lb (104 kg)	Jr	Massanutten Military Academy; Georgetown	Washington, D.C.
F	10	Cyril Langevine	6 ft 8 in (2.03 m)	230 lb (104 kg)	Sr	The Patrick School	East Orange, NJ
G	11	Jeff Dowtin	6 ft 3 in (1.91 m)	185 lb (84 kg)	Sr	St. John's	Washington, D.C.
G	13	Eric Dadika (W)	6 ft 0 in (1.83 m)	175 lb (79 kg)	Sr	Spotswood	Milltown, NJ
F	15	Mekhi Long	6 ft 7 in (2.01 m)	195 lb (88 kg)	Fr	Bishop McNamara	Bryans Road, MD
G	20	Jordan Green (W)	5 ft 9 in (1.75 m)	160 lb (73 kg)	Sr	Millbrook School	Bronx, NY
F	21	Jacob Toppin	6 ft 8 in (2.03 m)	190 lb (86 kg)	Fr	Woodstock Academy	Brooklyn, NY
F	23	D. J. Johnson	6 ft 7 in (2.01 m)	185 lb (84 kg)	Jr	Brooklyn Collegiate Prep; Williston State	Brooklyn, NY

Head coach

- David Cox (William & Mary)

Assistant coach(es)

- T. J. Buchanan (Rhode Island)
- Austin Carroll (American)
- Kevin Sutton (James Madison)

Legend

- (C) Team captain
- (S) Suspended
- (I) Ineligible
- (W) Walk-on
- Injured
- Current redshirt

Roster

== Schedule and results ==
Date time, TV	Rank^{#}	Opponent^{#}	Result	Record	Site (attendance) city, state
Exhibition
October 26, 2019*; 7:00 pm		Rhode Island College	W 93–55		Ryan Center; Kingston, RI
Non-conference regular season
November 5, 2019*; 7:00 pm, Cox/YurView		LIU	W 76–65	1–0	Ryan Center (4,258); Kingston, RI
November 9, 2019*; 9:00 pm, FS1		at No. 7 Maryland	L 55–73	1–1	Xfinity Center (14,263); College Park, MD
November 15, 2019*; 7:30 pm, NBCSN		Alabama	W 93–79	2–1	Ryan Center (7,021); Kingston, RI
November 19, 2018*; 7:00 pm, Cox/YurView		Nicholls; Jersey Mike's Jamaica Classic campus game	W 70–65	3–1	Ryan Center (4,520); Kingston, RI
November 22, 2019*; 4:30 pm, CBSSN		vs. North Texas; Jersey Mike's Jamaica Classic	W 60–47	4–1	Montego Bay Convention Centre; Montego Bay, Jamaica
November 24, 2019*; 2:30 pm, CBSSN		vs. LSU; Jersey Mike's Jamaica Classic	L 83–96	4–2	Montego Bay Convention Centre; Montego Bay, Jamaica
November 27, 2019*; 4:00 pm, ESPN+		Manhattan	W 73–64	5–2	Ryan Center (4,434); Kingston, RI
December 1, 2019*; 2:00 pm		at West Virginia	L 81–86	5–3	WVU Coliseum (10,973); Morgantown, WV
December 6, 2019*; 7:00 pm, ESPN2		Providence; Ocean State Cup	W 75–61	6–3	Ryan Center (8,052); Kingston, RI
December 21, 2019*; 2:00 pm, Cox/YurView		Western Kentucky	W 86–82 ^{OT}	7–3	Ryan Center (5,325); Kingston, RI
December 29, 2019*; 4:00 pm, ESPN+		at Middle Tennessee	W 89–62	8–3	Murphy Center (2,806); Murfreesboro, TN
January 2, 2020*; 7:00 pm, ESPN+		at Brown; Ocean State Cup	L 75–85	8–4	Pizzitola Sports Center (2,738); Providence, RI
Atlantic 10 regular season
January 5, 2020; 12:00 pm, Cox/YurView/ESPN+		Richmond	L 61–69	8–5 (0–1)	Ryan Center (5,325); Kingston, RI
January 8, 2020; 7:00 pm, CBSSN		Davidson	W 69–58	9–5 (1–1)	Ryan Center (5,095); Kingston, RI
January 11, 2020; 7:00 pm, CBSSN		at VCU	W 65–56	10–5 (2–1)	Siegel Center (7,637); Richmond, VA
January 15, 2020; 7:30 pm, Cox/YurView/ESPN+		at Saint Joseph's	W 71–61	11–5 (3–1)	Hagan Arena (1,964); Philadelphia, PA
January 18, 2020; 12:30 pm, NBCSN		La Salle	W 66–63	12–5 (4–1)	Ryan Center (6,323); Kingston, RI
January 22, 2020; 7:00 pm, Cox/YurView/ESPN+		Duquesne	W 77–55	13–5 (5–1)	Ryan Center (6,007); Kingston, RI
January 25, 2020; 3:00 pm, Stadium		at St. Bonaventure	W 81–75	14–5 (6–1)	Reilly Center (5,480); St. Bonaventure, NY
January 28, 2020; 7:00 pm, Stadium		at George Mason	W 78–64	15–5 (7–1)	EagleBank Arena (3,140); Fairfax, VA
January 31, 2020; 7:00 pm, ESPN2		VCU	W 87–75	16–5 (8–1)	Ryan Center (7,896); Kingston, RI
February 4, 2020; 7:00 pm, CBSSN		Massachusetts	W 73–67	17–5 (9–1)	Ryan Center (6,328); Kingston, RI
February 8, 2020; 12:00 pm, CBSSN		at George Washington	W 82–51	18–5 (10–1)	Charles E. Smith Center (3,018); Washington, D.C.
February 11, 2020; 7:30 pm, CBSSN		at No. 6 Dayton	L 67–81	18–6 (10–2)	UD Arena (13,407); Dayton, OH
February 15, 2020; 12:00 pm, CBSSN		Saint Joseph's	W 73–55	19–6 (11–2)	Ryan Center (6,673); Kingston, RI
February 22, 2020; 5:30 pm, CBSSN		at Davidson	L 75-77 ^{OT}	19–7 (11–3)	John M. Belk Arena (4,597); Davidson, NC
February 26, 2020; 7:00 pm, Cox/YurView/ESPN+		at Fordham	W 76–75	20–7 (12–3)	Rose Hill Gymnasium (1,588); Bronx, NY
March 1, 2020; 2:00 pm, ESPNU		Saint Louis	L 62–72	20–8 (12–4)	Ryan Center (7,004); Kingston, RI
March 4, 2020; 9:00 pm, CBSSN		No. 3 Dayton	L 57–84	20–9 (12–5)	Ryan Center (7,895); Kingston, RI
March 7, 2020; 7:00 pm, ESPN+		at Massachusetts	W 64–63	21–9 (13–5)	Mullins Center (4,053); Amherst, MA
Atlantic 10 tournament
Mar 13, 2020; 8:30 p.m., NBCSN	(3)	vs. TBD; Quarterfinals	A10 Tournament Canceled		Barclays Center; Brooklyn, NY
*Non-conference game. ^{#}Rankings from AP Poll. (#) Tournament seedings in parentheses. All times are in Eastern Time.
