= 2019–20 UMass Minutemen basketball team =

American college basketball season

2019–20 UMass Minutemen basketball
- Conference: Atlantic 10 Conference
- Record: 14–17 (8–10 A-10)
- Head coach: Matt McCall (3rd season)
- Assistant coaches: Tyson Wheeler; Tony Bergeron; Lucious Jordan
- Home arena: Mullins Center

2019–20 Atlantic 10 men's basketball standings
	Conf.				Overall
Team	W		L	PCT	W		L	PCT
No. 3 Dayton	18	–	0	1.000	29	–	2	.935
Richmond	14	–	4	.778	24	–	7	.774
Rhode Island	13	–	5	.722	21	–	9	.700
Saint Louis	12	–	6	.667	23	–	8	.742
St. Bonaventure	11	–	7	.611	19	–	12	.613
Duquesne	11	–	7	.611	21	–	9	.700
Davidson	10	–	8	.556	16	–	14	.533
Massachusetts	8	–	10	.444	14	–	17	.452
VCU	8	–	10	.444	18	–	13	.581
La Salle	6	–	12	.333	15	–	15	.500
George Washington	6	–	12	.333	12	–	20	.375
George Mason	5	–	13	.278	17	–	15	.531
Saint Joseph's	2	–	16	.111	6	–	26	.188
Fordham	2	–	16	.111	9	–	22	.290
Note: The 2020 A-10 tournament was canceled after the first round due to the COVID-19 pandemic. Rankings from AP poll

The 2019–20 UMass Minutemen basketball team represented the University of Massachusetts Amherst during the 2019–20 NCAA Division I men's basketball season. The Minutemen were led by third-year head coach Matt McCall and played their home games at the William D. Mullins Memorial Center in Amherst, Massachusetts as members of the Atlantic 10 Conference. They finished the season 14–17, 8–10 in A-10 play to finish in eighth place. Their season ended with the A-10 tournament and all other postseason tournaments were canceled due to the ongoing coronavirus pandemic.

== Previous season ==
The Minutemen finished the 2018–19 season 11–21, 4–14 in A-10 play to finish in 13th place. They lost to George Washington in the first round of the A-10 tournament.

=== Departures ===
Name	Number	Pos.	Height	Weight	Year	Hometown	Reason for departure
Tre Wood	0	G	6' 1“	165	Freshman	Upper Marlboro, MD	Transferred to LIU Brooklyn
Luwane Pipkins	2	G	5' 11“	185	Senior	Chicago, IL	Graduate transferred to Providence
Kieran Hayward	3	G	6'4"	195	Junior	Sydney, Australia	Transferred to Vanguard University (CA)
Unique McLean	4	G	6'2“	175	Senior	Brooklyn, NY	Graduate transferred to St. Francis Brooklyn
Jonathan Laurent	11	F	6'6“	216	Junior	Orlando, FL	Transferred to Oklahoma State
Jaylen Franklin	13	G	6'0“	175	Junior	Springfield, MA	Transferred to The College of Wooster (OH)
Khalea Turner-Morris	14	C	6' 9“	265	Junior	New Orleans, LA	lingering injuries forced him to stop playing, prior to the season starting
Curtis Cobb	33	G	6'4“	175	Senior	Fall River, MA	Graduate transferred to Wagner
Aidan Byrne	41	F	6'6"	215	Junior	Niskayuna, NY	walk-on from 2018 to 2019 no longer listed on the roster
Rashaan Holloway	45	C	6'11"	310	Senior	Elmer, NJ	Graduated

=== Incoming transfers ===
Name	Number	Pos.	Height	Weight	Year	Hometown	Previous School
Dibaji Walker		F	6'7"	190	Sophomore	Columbus, OH	Transferred from Cleveland State. Inactive. NCAA transfer rules mandate he sits out in 2019–20, but he has applied for a special exemption. His exemption has been approved.

=== 2019 recruiting class ===
College recruiting information
Name	Hometown	School	Height	Weight	Commit date
Tre Mitchell #33 C	Pittsburgh, PA	Woodstock Academy	6 ft 9 in (2.06 m)	240 lb (110 kg)	Mar 29, 2019
Tre Mitchell #33 C	Recruit ratings: Scout: Rivals: 247Sports: ESPN:				
John Buggs #0 G	Homer, LA	Putnam Science Academy; Summerfield High School	6 ft 2 in (1.88 m)	185 lb (84 kg)	Nov 20, 2018
John Buggs #0 G	Recruit ratings: Scout: Rivals: 247Sports: ESPN:				
Sean East II #10 G	Louisville, KY	Combine Academy; New Albany High School	6 ft 3 in (1.91 m)	185 lb (84 kg)	Apr 28, 2019
Sean East II #10 G	Recruit ratings: Scout: Rivals: 247Sports: ESPN:				
C.J. Jackson #3 F	Atlanta, GA	Athens Prep; Greenforest High School	6 ft 6 in (1.98 m)	185 lb (84 kg)	May 15, 2019
C.J. Jackson #3 F	Recruit ratings: Scout: Rivals: 247Sports: ESPN:				
Kolton Mitchell #13 G	Fort Myers, FL	Victory Rock Prep	6 ft 3 in (1.91 m)	175 lb (79 kg)	May 30, 2019
Kolton Mitchell #13 G	Recruit ratings: Scout: Rivals: 247Sports: ESPN:				
Preston Santos #2 G/F	Providence, RI	Woodstock Academy	6 ft 6 in (1.98 m)	180 lb (82 kg)	Oct 15, 2018
Preston Santos #2 G/F	Recruit ratings: Scout: Rivals: 247Sports: ESPN:				
T.J. Weeks #23 G	Warwick, RI	Woodstock Academy; Bishop Hendricken High School	6 ft 4 in (1.93 m)	185 lb (84 kg)	Mar 24, 2019
T.J. Weeks #23 G	Recruit ratings: Scout: Rivals: 247Sports: ESPN:				
Overall recruit ranking:
Note: In many cases, Scout, Rivals, 247Sports, On3, and ESPN may conflict in their listings of height and weight.; In these cases, the average was taken. ESPN grades are on a 100-point scale.; Sources: "2019 Team Ranking". Rivals.

== Roster ==
2019–20 UMass Minutemen men's basketball team
Players
Coaches

Pos.	#	Name	Height	Weight	Year	Previous school	Hometown
G	0	John Buggs	6 ft 2 in (1.88 m)	185 lb (84 kg)	Fr	Summerfield High School; Putnam Science Academy	Homer, LA
F	1	Sy Chatman	6 ft 8 in (2.03 m)	200 lb (91 kg)	So	Cretin-Derham Hall HS	Saint Paul, MN
G/F	2	Preston Santos	6 ft 6 in (1.98 m)	180 lb (82 kg)	Fr	Woodstock Academy	Providence, RI
G/F	3	C.J. Jackson	6 ft 6 in (1.98 m)	185 lb (84 kg)	Fr	Greenforest HS	Atlanta, GA
G	4	Keon Clergeot	6 ft 1 in (1.85 m)	185 lb (84 kg)	RS Jr	Auburndale HS; Memphis	Winter Haven, FL
F	5	Samba Diallo	6 ft 7 in (2.01 m)	195 lb (88 kg)	So	Pope John XXIII Regional HS	Rufisque, Senegal
G	10	Sean East II	6 ft 3 in (1.91 m)	185 lb (84 kg)	Fr	New Albany HS	Louisville, KY
C	11	Djery Baptiste	6 ft 10 in (2.08 m)	245 lb (111 kg)	GS	Prestonwood Christian Academy	Gonaives, Haiti
G	12	Carl Pierre	6 ft 4 in (1.93 m)	190 lb (86 kg)	Jr	Boston College HS	Boston, MA
G	13	Kolton Mitchell	6 ft 3 in (1.91 m)	175 lb (79 kg)	Fr	Victory Rock Prep	Fort Myers, FL
G	20	Davonté Higginbottom (W)	6 ft 1 in (1.85 m)	175 lb (79 kg)	Sr	Westwood HS	Mattapan, MA
G	23	T.J. Weeks	6 ft 4 in (1.93 m)	185 lb (84 kg)	Fr	Bishop Hendricken Catholic HS	Warwick, RI
F	24	Dibaji Walker	6 ft 9 in (2.06 m)	190 lb (86 kg)	So	Woodstock Academy; Cleveland State	Columbus, OH
F	31	Randall West	6 ft 4 in (1.93 m)	220 lb (100 kg)	RS Sr	Lawrenceville School	Moorestown, NJ
C	33	Tre Mitchell	6 ft 9 in (2.06 m)	240 lb (109 kg)	Fr	Woodstock Academy	Pittsburgh, PA

Head coach

- Matt McCall (Chattanooga)

Assistant coach(es)

- Tony Bergeron (Woodstock Academy)
- Tyson Wheeler (Fairfield)
- Lucious Jordan (Albany)

Legend

- (C) Team captain
- (S) Suspended
- (I) Ineligible
- (W) Walk-on
- Injured
- Current redshirt

Roster

== Schedule and results ==
Date time, TV	Rank^{#}	Opponent^{#}	Result	Record	Site (attendance) city, state
Exhibition
October 29, 2019*; 7:00 pm		Western New England	W 83–47		Mullins Center; Amherst, MA
Non-conference regular season
November 5, 2019*; 7:00 pm, NESN/ESPN+		UMass Lowell	W 79–64	1–0	Mullins Center (2,563); Amherst, MA
November 9, 2019*; 1:00 pm		at Fairfield	W 62–60	2–0	Webster Bank Arena (1,087); Bridgeport, CT
November 12, 2019*; 7:00 pm, NESNplus/ESPN+		Northeastern	W 80–71	3–0	Mullins Center (2,145); Amherst, MA
November 16, 2019*; 1:00 pm, ESPN+		Central Connecticut; Hall of Fame Tip Off campus game	W 89–43	4–0	Mullins Center (2,873); Amherst, MA
November 20, 2019*; 7:00 pm, NESN		Rider; Hall of Fame Tip Off campus game	W 82–72	5–0	Mullins Center (2,378); Amherst, MA
November 23, 2019*; 12:00 pm, ESPNews		vs. No. 7 Virginia; Hall of Fame Tip Off semifinals	L 46–58	5–1	Mohegan Sun Arena (7,862); Uncasville, CT
November 24, 2019*; 3:30 pm, ESPN2		vs. St. John's; Hall of Fame Tip Off consolation	L 63–78	5–2	Mohegan Sun Arena (5,822); Uncasville, CT
November 29, 2019*; 2:00 pm, BTN Plus		at Rutgers	L 57–82	5–3	Louis Brown Athletic Center (5,592); Piscataway, NJ
December 4, 2019*; 7:00 pm, CBSSN		South Carolina	L 80–84	5–4	Mullins Center (3,043); Amherst, MA
December 7, 2019*; 1:00 pm, NESN		at Harvard	L 55–89	5–5	Lavietes Pavilion (1,636); Cambridge, MA
December 11, 2019*; 7:00 pm, NESN		Yale	L 80–83 ^{OT}	5–6	Mullins Center (2,212); Amherst, MA
December 20, 2019*; 7:00 pm, NESN		Maine	W 74–53	6–6	Mullins Center (2,194); Amherst, MA
December 30, 2019*; 7:00 pm, ESPN+		at Akron	L 79–85	6–7	James A. Rhodes Arena (2,375); Akron, OH
A-10 regular season
January 5, 2020; 4:00 pm, NBCSN		at Saint Louis	L 80–83 ^{OT}	6–8 (0–1)	Chaifetz Arena (8,743); St. Louis, MO
January 8, 2020; 7:00 pm, NESN		La Salle	W 77–69	7–8 (1–1)	Mullins Center (1,894); Amherst, MA
January 11, 2020; 12:30 pm, NBCSN		at No. 15 Dayton	L 60–88	7–9 (1–2)	UD Arena (13,407); Dayton, OH
January 15, 2020; 7:00 pm, ESPN+		vs. St. Bonaventure; Roc City Hoops Classic	L 61–74	7–10 (1–3)	Blue Cross Arena (4,276); Rochester, NY
January 18, 2020; 4:30 pm, NBCSN		George Washington	L 51–75	7–11 (1–4)	Mullins Center (3,323); Amherst, MA
January 22, 2020; 7:00 pm, ESPN+		at George Mason	L 63–73	7–12 (1–5)	EagleBank Arena (2,652); Fairfax, VA
January 25, 2020; 2:00 pm, NESNplus		Duquesne	W 73–64	8–12 (2–5)	Mullins Center (2,785); Amherst, MA
January 29, 2020; 7:00 pm, NESN		Saint Joseph's	W 91–76	9–12 (3–5)	Mullins Center (2,024); Amherst, MA
February 1, 2020; 8:00 pm, CBSSN		at Davidson	L 50–85	9–13 (3–6)	John M. Belk Arena (3,832); Davidson, NC
February 4, 2020; 7:00 pm, CBSSN		at Rhode Island	L 67–73	9–14 (3–7)	Ryan Center (6,328); Kingston, RI
February 9, 2020; 2:30 pm, NBCSN		George Mason	W 69–67	10–14 (4–7)	Mullins Center (2,313); Amherst, MA
February 15, 2020; 12:30 pm, NBCSN		No. 6 Dayton	L 63–71	10–15 (4–8)	Mullins Center (5,030); Amherst, MA
February 18, 2020; 7:00 pm, NESN		Saint Louis	W 67–63	11–15 (5–8)	Mullins Center (2,185); Amherst, MA
February 22, 2020; 4:00 pm, ESPN+		at Fordham	W 57–49	12–15 (6–8)	Rose Hill Gymnasium (1,560); Bronx, NY
February 26, 2020; 7:00 pm, NESNplus		VCU	W 60–52	13–15 (7–8)	Mullins Center (2,462); Amherst, MA
February 29, 2020; 6:00 pm, ESPN+		at Richmond	L 71–95	13–16 (7–9)	Robins Center (7,201); Richmond, VA
March 4, 2020; 7:00 pm, ESPN+		at La Salle	W 75–64	14–16 (8–9)	Tom Gola Arena (1,352); Philadelphia, PA
March 7, 2020; 7:00 pm, NESNplus		Rhode Island	L 63-64	14-17 (8-10)	Mullins Center (4,053); Amherst, MA
A-10 tournament
March 12, 2020; 12:00 pm, NBCSN	(8)	vs. (9) VCU; Second round	A10 Tournament Canceled		Barclays Center; Brooklyn, NY
*Non-conference game. ^{#}Rankings from AP Poll / Coaches' Poll. (#) Tournament seedings in parentheses. All times are in Eastern.
