= 2019–20 VCU Rams men's basketball team =

American college basketball season

2019–20 VCU Rams men's basketball
- Conference: Atlantic 10 Conference
- Record: 18–13 (8–10 A-10)
- Head coach: Mike Rhoades (3rd season)
- Assistant coaches: J. D. Byers; Brent Scott; Jamal Brunt
- Home arena: Stuart C. Siegel Center

2019–20 Atlantic 10 men's basketball standings
	Conf.				Overall
Team	W		L	PCT	W		L	PCT
No. 3 Dayton	18	–	0	1.000	29	–	2	.935
Richmond	14	–	4	.778	24	–	7	.774
Rhode Island	13	–	5	.722	21	–	9	.700
Saint Louis	12	–	6	.667	23	–	8	.742
St. Bonaventure	11	–	7	.611	19	–	12	.613
Duquesne	11	–	7	.611	21	–	9	.700
Davidson	10	–	8	.556	16	–	14	.533
Massachusetts	8	–	10	.444	14	–	17	.452
VCU	8	–	10	.444	18	–	13	.581
La Salle	6	–	12	.333	15	–	15	.500
George Washington	6	–	12	.333	12	–	20	.375
George Mason	5	–	13	.278	17	–	15	.531
Saint Joseph's	2	–	16	.111	6	–	26	.188
Fordham	2	–	16	.111	9	–	22	.290
Note: The 2020 A-10 tournament was canceled after the first round due to the COVID-19 pandemic. Rankings from AP poll

The 2019–20 VCU Rams men's basketball team represented Virginia Commonwealth University during the 2019–20 NCAA Division I men's basketball season. The Rams were by Mike Rhoades in his third season as head coach at VCU. The Rams played their home games at Stuart C. Siegel Center in Richmond, Virginia as members of the Atlantic 10 Conference (A-10).

VCU opened the season with a 6–0 record, making it the first time in program history for the Rams to win their first six games, and were ranked for the first time in three seasons. In February, however, VCU lost seven of their final nine games, giving the program its worst losing streak since the 1997–98 season. This caused the program to finish with a regular season record of 18–13 and 8–10 in conference play. VCU was seeded eighth in the 2020 Atlantic 10 men's basketball tournament, and were slated to play UMass in the second round. The game, and the tournament, was cancelled due to the COVID-19 pandemic. VCU finished the season 18–13, making it the 20th consecutive season VCU finished with a winning overall record.

== Previous season ==
The Rams, surpassing preseason expectations, won the A-10 regular season, posting a 25–8 record and 16–2 record in Atlantic 10 play (their best ever in that league) and earned an at-large bid into the 2019 NCAA Division I men's basketball tournament. There they lost to UCF in the opening round of the tournament.

== Offseason ==
=== Departures ===
Name	Number	Pos.	Height	Weight	Year	Hometown	Notes
Xavier Jackson	15	G	6'3"	190	Senior	Hinesville, Georgia	Graduated
Michael Gillmore	22	F	6'10"	210	RS Senior	Jacksonville, Florida	Graduated
Sean Mobley	5	F	6'8"	225	Sophomore	Melbourne, Florida	Transferred to UCF
P. J. Byrd	24	G	6'1"	185	Freshman	Houston, Texas	Transferred to Colorado State

=== 2019 recruiting class ===
College recruiting information
Name	Hometown	School	Height	Weight	Commit date
Bones Hyland; PG	Wilmington, DE	St. Georges Technical High School	6 ft 3 in (1.91 m)	165 lb (75 kg)	Jun 4, 2019
Bones Hyland; PG	Recruit ratings: Scout: Rivals: 247Sports: (NR)				
Jarren McAllister; SF	Wake Forest, NC	Massanutten Military Academy	6 ft 4 in (1.93 m)	160 lb (73 kg)	Oct 16, 2018
Jarren McAllister; SF	Recruit ratings: Scout: Rivals: 247Sports: (80)				
Hason Ward; PF	Saint Thomas, Barbados	Springfield Central High School	6 ft 9 in (2.06 m)	200 lb (91 kg)	May 15, 2019
Hason Ward; PF	Recruit ratings: Scout: Rivals: 247Sports: (NR)				
Tre Clark; PG	Covington, GA	Newton High School	6 ft 2 in (1.88 m)	180 lb (82 kg)	Jan 13, 2019
Tre Clark; PG	Recruit ratings: (NR)				
Overall recruit ranking:
Note: In many cases, Scout, Rivals, 247Sports, On3, and ESPN may conflict in their listings of height and weight.; In these cases, the average was taken. ESPN grades are on a 100-point scale.; Sources: "VCU 2019 Player Commits". ESPN.; "2019 Team Ranking". Rivals.

== Roster ==
2019–20 VCU Rams men's basketball team
Players
Coaches

Pos.	#	Name	Height	Weight	Year	Previous school	Hometown
G	0	De'Riante Jenkins	6 ft 5 in (1.96 m)	190 lb (86 kg)	Sr	Hargrave Military Academy	Eutawville, South Carolina
G/F	1	Mike'L Simms	6 ft 5 in (1.96 m)	210 lb (95 kg)	Sr	Cowley CC	Richmond, Virginia
G	2	Marcus Evans	6 ft 2 in (1.88 m)	190 lb (86 kg)	RS Sr	Rice	Chesapeake, Virginia
F	4	Corey Douglas Jr.	6 ft 8 in (2.03 m)	220 lb (100 kg)	RS Jr	Ballard (Louisville); Tallahassee CC	Louisville, Kentucky
G	5	Bones Hyland	6 ft 3 in (1.91 m)	165 lb (75 kg)	Fr	St. Georges Technical	Wilmington, Delaware
G/F	10	Vince Williams Jr.	6 ft 6 in (1.98 m)	210 lb (95 kg)	So	St. John's Jesuit	Toledo, Ohio
G	11	KeShawn Curry	6 ft 4 in (1.93 m)	185 lb (84 kg)	So	Fork Union Military Academy	Jacksonville, Florida
G	12	Jimmy Clark III	6 ft 3 in (1.91 m)	175 lb (79 kg)	Fr	Newton HS	Covington, Georgia
G	13	Malik Crowfield	6 ft 4 in (1.93 m)	190 lb (86 kg)	Sr	Riverside Academy	LaPlace, Louisiana
F	14	Marcus Santos-Silva	6 ft 7 in (2.01 m)	250 lb (113 kg)	Jr	Vermont Academy	Taunton, Massachusetts
G	15	Arnold Henderson IV	5 ft 10 in (1.78 m)	175 lb (79 kg)	Fr	St. Christopher's School	Mechanicsville, Virginia
F	20	Hason Ward	6 ft 9 in (2.06 m)	200 lb (91 kg)	Fr	Springfield Central HS	Saint Thomas, Barbados
G	21	Jarren McAllister	6 ft 4 in (1.93 m)	200 lb (91 kg)	Fr	Massanutten Military Academy	Wake Forest, North Carolina
F	23	Issac Vann	6 ft 6 in (1.98 m)	200 lb (91 kg)	RS Sr	Maine	Bridgeport, Connecticut

Head coach

- Mike Rhoades (Lebanon Valley)

Assistant coach(es)

- J. D. Byers (Lebanon Valley)
- Brent Scott (Rice)
- Jamal Brunt (Randolph–Macon)

Legend

- (C) Team captain
- (S) Suspended
- (I) Ineligible
- (W) Walk-on
- Injured
- Current redshirt

Roster

== Schedule ==
Date time, TV	Rank^{#}	Opponent^{#}	Result	Record	High points	High rebounds	High assists	Site (attendance) city, state
Exhibition
October 26, 2019*; 7:00 pm	No. 25	Virginia State	W 90–53		15 – Evans	8 – Santos-Silva	3 – Hyland	Siegel Center (5,500); Richmond, VA
Non-conference regular season
November 5, 2019*; 7:00 pm, MASN	No. 25	Saint Francis (PA)	W 72–58	1–0	21 – Santos-Silva	18 – Santos-Silva	4 – Evans	Siegel Center (7,637); Richmond, VA
November 8, 2019*; 7:00 pm, MASN	No. 25	North Texas	W 59–56	2–0	13 – Evans	7 – Santos-Silva	3 – Santos-Silva	Siegel Center (7,637); Richmond, VA
November 13, 2019*; 6:00 pm, ESPN2		No. 23 LSU	W 84–82	3–0	17 – Santos-Silva	11 – Santos-Silva	3 – Tied	Siegel Center (7,637); Richmond, VA
November 17, 2019*; 12:00 pm, MASN		Jacksonville State; Emerald Coast Classic first round	W 93–65	4–0	13 – Simms	7 – Santos-Silva	4 – Hyland	Siegel Center (7,637); Richmond, VA
November 23, 2019*; 7:00 pm, MASN	No. 21	Florida Gulf Coast	W 78–48	5–0	16 – Evans	11 – Santos-Silva	4 – Evans	Siegel Center (7,637); Richmond, VA
November 25, 2019*; 7:00 pm, MASN	No. 20	Alabama State; Emerald Coast Classic second round	W 78–62	6–0	25 – Evans	9 – Santos-Silva	3 – Tied	Siegel Center (7,637); Richmond, VA
November 29, 2019*; 8:30 pm, CBSSN	No. 20	vs. Purdue; Emerald Coast Classic third round	L 56–59	6–1	19 – Santos-Silva	6 – Jenkins	2 – Williams	The Arena at NWFSC; Niceville, FL
November 30, 2019*; 4:00 pm	No. 20	vs. No. 17 Tennessee; Emerald Coast Classic final round	L 69–72	6–2	22 – Santos-Silva	11 – Santos-Silva	4 – Simms	The Arena at NWSFC (2,500); Niceville, FL
December 7, 2019*; 8:00 pm, MASN		Old Dominion; Rivalry	W 69–57	7–2	13 – Santos-Silva	6 – Jenkins	3 – Tied	Siegel Center (7,637); Richmond, VA
December 15, 2019*; 7:00 pm, MASN		Missouri State	W 61–51	8–2	11 – Simms	6 – Tied	3 – Evans	Siegel Center (7,637); Richmond, VA
December 18, 2019*; 7:00 pm, FloSports		at Charleston; A10–CAA Challenge	W 76–71	9–2	17 – Santos-Silva	11 – Santos-Silva	4 – Williams	TD Arena (3,938); Charleston, SC
December 21, 2019*; 12:00 pm, ESPN2		at Wichita State	L 63–73	9–3	15 – Evans	7 – Jenkins	2 – Vann	Charles Koch Arena (10,506); Wichita, KS
December 29, 2019*; 5:00 pm, MASN		Loyola (MD)	W 85–51	10–3	15 – Jenkins	7 – Santos-Silva	5 – Jenkins	Siegel Center (7,637); Richmond, VA
Atlantic 10 regular season
January 2, 2020; 7:00 pm, MASN		Fordham	W 64–46	11–3 (1–0)	14 – Simms	8 – Simms	6 – Evans	Siegel Center (7,637); Richmond, VA
January 5, 2020; 12:00 pm, NBCSN		at George Mason; Rivalry	W 72–59	12–3 (2–0)	26 – Santos-Silva	12 – Santos-Silva	6 – Evans	EagleBank Arena (6,513); Fairfax, VA
January 11, 2020; 2:00 pm, CBSSN		Rhode Island	L 56–65	12–4 (2–1)	14 – Jenkins	14 – Santos-Silva	4 – Evans	Siegel Center (7,637); Richmond, VA
January 14, 2020; 8:00 pm, CBSSN		at No. 13 Dayton	L 65–79	12–5 (2–2)	16 – Tied	9 – Santos-Silva	4 – Evans	UD Arena (13,407); Dayton, OH
January 18, 2020; 2:00 pm, CBSSN		St. Bonaventure	W 91–63	13–5 (3–2)	21 – Hyland	11 – Santos-Silva	5 – Jenkins	Siegel Center (7,637); Richmond, VA
January 21, 2020; 9:00 pm, CBSSN		at Saint Joseph's	W 73–60	14–5 (4–2)	13 – Curry	12 – Santos-Silva	2 – 4 tied	Hagan Arena (1,725); Philadelphia, PA
January 25, 2020; 12:00 pm, NBCSN		at La Salle	W 76–65	15–5 (5–2)	16 – Santos-Silva	9 – Santos-Silva	5 – Hyland	Tom Gola Arena (2,841); Philadelphia, PA
January 28, 2020; 7:00 pm, CBSSN		Richmond; Capital City Classic	W 87–68	16–5 (6–2)	15 – Hyland	8 – Tied	4 – Crowfield	Siegel Center (7,637); Richmond, VA
January 31, 2020; 7:00 pm, ESPN2		at Rhode Island	L 75–87	16–6 (6–3)	16 – Hyland	4 – Vann	6 – Evans	Ryan Center (7,896); Kingston, RI
February 7, 2020; 7:00 pm, ESPN2		Davidson	W 73–62	17–6 (7–3)	19 – Evans	7 – Jenkins	4 – Tied	Siegel Center (7,637); Richmond, VA
February 12, 2020; 7:00 pm, ESPNU		George Mason	L 67–72	17–7 (7–4)	16 – Jenkins	7 – Santos-Silva	4 – Tied	Siegel Center (7,637); Richmond, VA
February 15, 2020; 4:00 pm, CBSSN		at Richmond	L 59–77	17–8 (7–5)	14 – Santos-Silva	12 – Santos-Silva	3 – Vann	Robins Center (7,201); Richmond, VA
February 18, 2020; 8:30 pm, CBSSN		No. 5 Dayton	L 61–66	17–9 (7–6)	18 – Hyland	17 – Santos-Silva	2 – 3 tied	Siegel Center (7,637); Richmond, VA
February 21, 2020; 9:00 pm, ESPN2		at Saint Louis	L 62–80	17–10 (7–7)	11 – Santos-Silva	6 – Williams	2 – 3 tied	Chaifetz Arena (9,234); St. Louis, MO
February 26, 2020; 7:00 pm, ESPN+		at UMass	L 52–60	17–11 (7–8)	14 – Santos-Silva	11 – Santos-Silva	4 – Hyland	Mullins Center (2,462); Amherst, MA
February 29, 2020; 4:00 pm, CBSSN		George Washington	W 75–51	18–11 (8–8)	14 – Simms	10 – Santos-Silva	4 – Vann, Hyland	Siegel Center (7,637); Richmond, VA
March 3, 2020; 7:00 pm, ESPN+		Duquesne	L 77–80 ^{OT}	18–12 (8–9)	24 – Santos-Silva	8 – Santos-Silva	3 – Clark III	Siegel Center (7,637); Richmond, VA
March 6, 2020; 9:00 pm, ESPN2		at Davidson	L 65–75	18–13 (8–10)	17 – Hyland	5 – Tied	3 – Hyland	John M. Belk Arena (3,763); Davidson, NC
Atlantic 10 tournament
Mar 12, 2020; 12:00 pm, NBCSN	(8)	vs. (9) UMass	Cancelled due to the COVID-19 pandemic					Barclays Center; Brooklyn, NY
*Non-conference game. ^{#}Rankings from AP Poll. (#) Tournament seedings in parentheses. All times are in Eastern Time.

== Rankings ==
Ranking movements Legend: ██ Increase in ranking ██ Decrease in ranking — = Not ranked RV = Received votes т = Tied with team above or below
	Week																				
Poll	Pre	1	2	3	4	5	6	7	8	9	10	11	12	13	14	15	16	17	18	19	Final
AP	25	RV	21	20	RV	RV	RV	—	—	RV	—	—	—	—	—	—	—	—			Not released
Coaches	RV	RV	19	19	RV	RV	25-T	RV	RV	—	—	—	—	—	—	—	—	—			

*AP does not release post-NCAA Tournament rankings
