= Jaren Holmes =

American basketball player (born 1998)

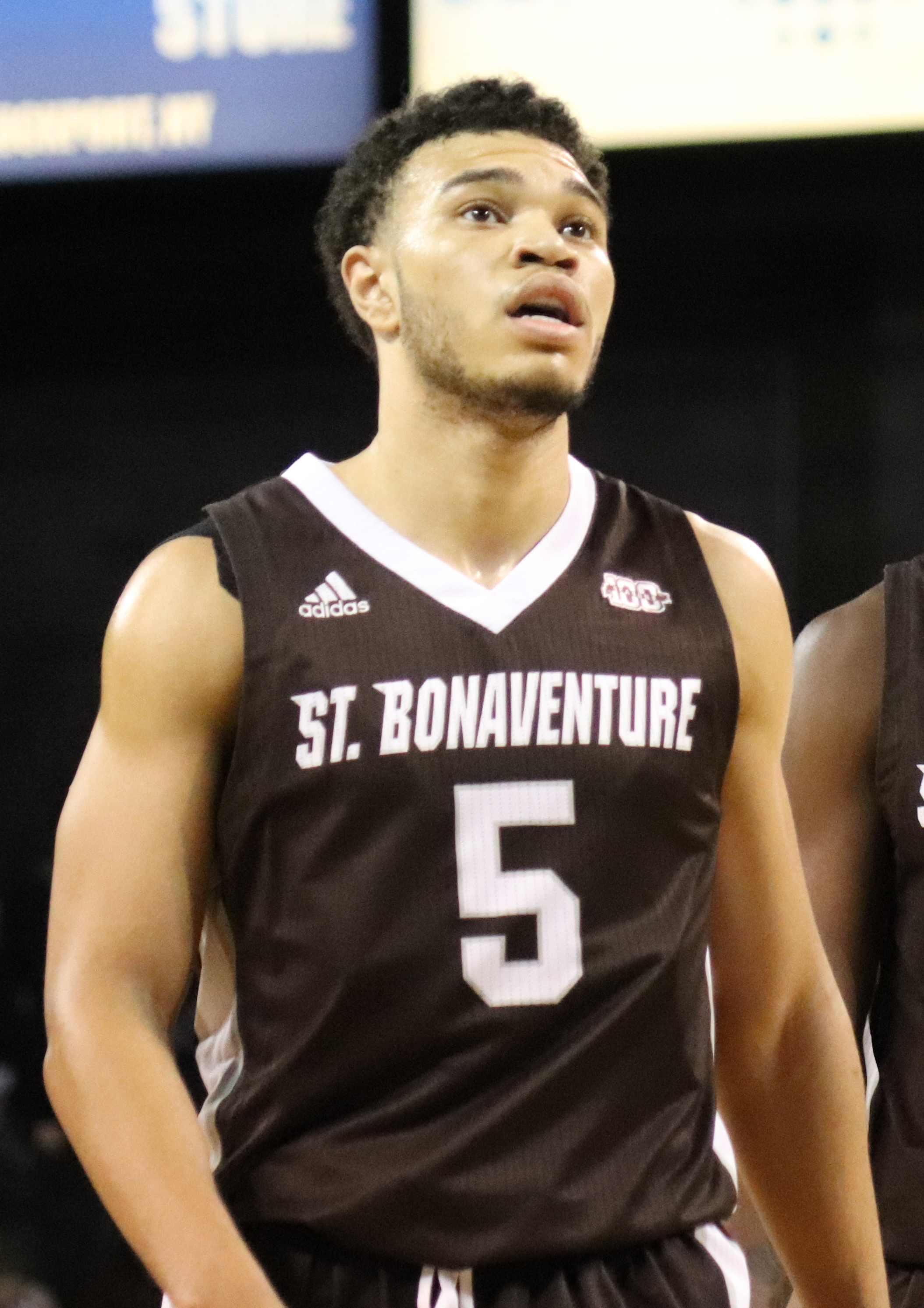
- Holmes with St. Bonaventure in 2019

Free Agent
- Position: Shooting guard

Personal information
- Born: November 24, 1998 (age 27)
- Listed height: 6 ft 4 in (1.93 m)
- Listed weight: 210 lb (95 kg)

Career information
- High school: Liggett (Grosse Pointe Woods, Michigan); Romulus (Romulus, Michigan)
- College: Ranger (2018–2019); St. Bonaventure (2019–2022); Iowa State (2022–2024)
- Playing career: 2024–present

Career history
- 2024–2025: Hubo Limburg United

Career highlights
- Big 12 All-Newcomer Team (2023); Second-team All-Atlantic 10 (2021); Second-team All-NTJCAC (2019)

Jaren Jamir Holmes (born Jaren Jamir English; November 24, 1998) is an American professional basketball player who last played for Hubo Limburg United of the BNXT League. He previously played for the Ranger Rangers, St. Bonaventure Bonnies and Iowa State.

== High school career ==
Holmes played basketball for University Liggett School in Grosse Pointe Woods, Michigan before transferring to Romulus Senior High School in Romulus, Michigan for his junior season. As a senior, he averaged 17 points, six rebounds and four assists per game. Holmes received no NCAA Division I offers out of high school.

== College career ==
As a freshman, Holmes played for Ranger College. He averaged 12 points, five rebounds and two assists per game, helping his team reach the NJCAA Division I Championship Game. Holmes earned Second Team All-North Texas Junior College Athletic Conference honors. He transferred to St. Bonaventure for his sophomore season. Holmes averaged 11.9 points, 4.8 rebounds and 2.2 assists per game in his first year with the team. On January 6, 2021, he recorded a career-high 38 points and 10 rebounds, shooting 8-of-12 from three-point range, in an 83–57 win against Saint Joseph's. As a junior, Holmes averaged 13.8 points, 5.3 rebounds and two assists per game, and was named to the Second Team All-Atlantic 10. He averaged 13.5 points, five rebounds and 3.6 assists per game as a senior. Holmes opted to transfer to Iowa State for his final season of eligibility. He was named All-Big 12 Honorable Mention, and garnered a spot on the Big 12 All-Newcomer Team.

== Professional career ==
On July 8, 2024, he signed with Hubo Limburg United of the BNXT League.

== Career statistics ==
Legend
| GP | Games played | GS | Games started | MPG | Minutes per game |
| FG% | Field goal percentage | 3P% | 3-point field goal percentage | FT% | Free throw percentage |
| RPG | Rebounds per game | APG | Assists per game | SPG | Steals per game |
| BPG | Blocks per game | PPG | Points per game | **Bold** | Career high |

=== College ===
==== NCAA Division I ====
| Year | Team | GP | GS | MPG | FG% | 3P% | FT% | RPG | APG | SPG | BPG | PPG |
|---|---|---|---|---|---|---|---|---|---|---|---|---|
| 2019–20 | St. Bonaventure | 24 | 23 | 31.4 | **.453** | **.400** | .750 | 4.8 | 2.2 | .6 | .2 | 11.9 |
| 2020–21 | St. Bonaventure | 21 | 21 | 33.0 | .422 | .381 | .643 | **5.3** | 2.0 | .9 | .1 | **13.8** |
| 2021–22 | St. Bonaventure | **33** | **33** | **38.0** | .392 | .273 | **.764** | 5.0 | **3.6** | **1.1** | **.3** | 13.5 |
| Career | | 78 | 77 | 34.1 | .422 | .352 | .720 | 5.0 | 2.6 | .9 | .2 | 13.1 |

==== JUCO ====
| Year | Team | GP | GS | MPG | FG% | 3P% | FT% | RPG | APG | SPG | BPG | PPG |
|---|---|---|---|---|---|---|---|---|---|---|---|---|
| 2018–19 | Ranger | 33 | 33 | – | .489 | .433 | .760 | 5.0 | 2.0 | 1.3 | .4 | 12.0 |

== Personal life ==
Holmes' younger brother, William, was a fifth-round pick by the Los Angeles Angels in the 2018 Major League Baseball draft. In 2020, he legally changed his last name from English to Holmes in honor of his mother, Gia Holmes. Holmes co-authored two articles for fact-checking website PolitiFact.
