= 2019–20 La Salle Explorers men's basketball team =

American college basketball season

2019–20 La Salle Explorers men's basketball
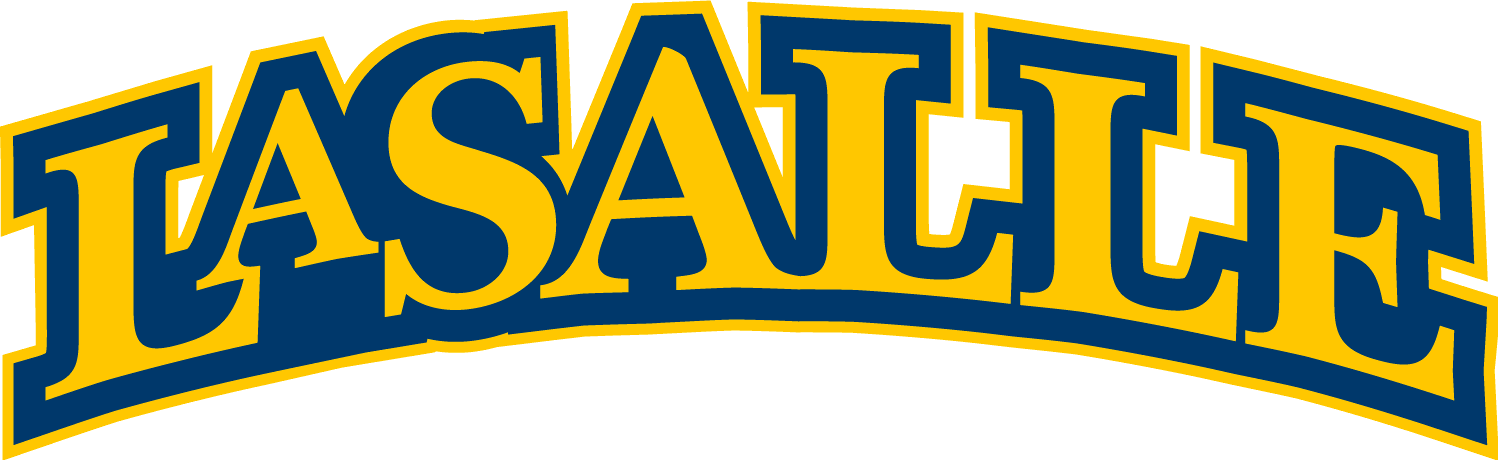

Gulf Coast Showcase champions
- Conference: Atlantic 10 Conference
- Record: 15–15 (6–12 A-10)
- Head coach: Ashley Howard (2nd season)
- Assistant coaches: Kenny Johnson; Donnie Carr; Kyle Griffin
- Home arena: Tom Gola Arena

2019–20 Atlantic 10 men's basketball standings
	Conf.				Overall
Team	W		L	PCT	W		L	PCT
No. 3 Dayton	18	–	0	1.000	29	–	2	.935
Richmond	14	–	4	.778	24	–	7	.774
Rhode Island	13	–	5	.722	21	–	9	.700
Saint Louis	12	–	6	.667	23	–	8	.742
St. Bonaventure	11	–	7	.611	19	–	12	.613
Duquesne	11	–	7	.611	21	–	9	.700
Davidson	10	–	8	.556	16	–	14	.533
Massachusetts	8	–	10	.444	14	–	17	.452
VCU	8	–	10	.444	18	–	13	.581
La Salle	6	–	12	.333	15	–	15	.500
George Washington	6	–	12	.333	12	–	20	.375
George Mason	5	–	13	.278	17	–	15	.531
Saint Joseph's	2	–	16	.111	6	–	26	.188
Fordham	2	–	16	.111	9	–	22	.290
Note: The 2020 A-10 tournament was canceled after the first round due to the COVID-19 pandemic. Rankings from AP poll

The 2019–20 La Salle Explorers basketball team represented La Salle University during the 2019–20 NCAA Division I men's basketball season. The Explorers, led by second-year head coach Ashley Howard, played their home games at Tom Gola Arena in Philadelphia, Pennsylvania as members of the Atlantic 10 (A-10) Conference.

== Previous season ==
The Explorers finished the 2018–19 season 10–21, 8–10 in A-10 play, to finish in ninth place. They lost in the second round of the A-10 tournament to Rhode Island.

== Offseason ==
=== Departures ===
Name	Number	Pos.	Height	Weight	Year	Hometown	Reason for departure
Pookie Powell	0	G	6'0"	185	RS Senior	Orlando, FL	Graduated
Jamir Moultrie	3	G	6'1"	175	Sophomore	Washington, D.C.	Transferred to North Carolina Central
Miles Brookins	4	F/C	6'10"	220	Sophomore	Cypress, CA	Transferred to Cal State Northridge
Cheddi Mosely	12	G	6'3"	185	RS Senior	Jersey City, NJ	Graduated
Traci Carter	25	G	6'1"	175	RS Junior	Philadelphia, PA	Graduate transferred to Hartford
Cian Sullivan	31	C	7'2"	215	RS Sophomore	Tralee, Ireland	Transferred to Hartford

=== Incoming transfers ===
Name	Number	Pos.	Height	Weight	Year	Hometown	Previous School
Kyle Thompson	12	G	5'10"	175	Sophomore	Philadelphia, PA	Transferred from West Chester. Under NCAA transfer rules, Thompson will sit out the 2019–20 season. Will have three years of remaining eligibility. Will join the team as a walk-on.
Clifton Moore	21	F	6'10"	230	Junior	Horsham, PA	Transferred from Indiana. Under NCAA transfer rules, Moore will sit out the 2019–20 season; will have two years of remaining eligibility.
Moustapha Diagne	35	F	6'9"	230	RS Senior	Rufisque, Senegal	Transferred from Western Kentucky. Diagne will be eligible to play immediately since he graduated from Western Kentucky.

=== 2019 recruiting class ===
College recruiting information
Name	Hometown	School	Height	Weight	Commit date
Sherif Kenney; PG	Upper Marlboro, MD	Rock Creek Christian Academy	6 ft 4 in (1.93 m)	190 lb (86 kg)	
Sherif Kenney; PG	Recruit ratings: Scout: Rivals: (80)				
Ayinde Hikim; PG	Washington, D.C.	Mount Zion Baptist Christian School	5 ft 10 in (1.78 m)	165 lb (75 kg)	Dec 15, 2018
Ayinde Hikim; PG	Recruit ratings: Scout: Rivals: (77)				
Brandon Stone; PF	Raleigh, NC	Christ School	6 ft 11 in (2.11 m)	200 lb (91 kg)	Sep 7, 2018
Brandon Stone; PF	Recruit ratings: Scout: Rivals: (77)				
Christian Ray; SG	Atglen, PA	The Haverford School	6 ft 4 in (1.93 m)	165 lb (75 kg)	Aug 29, 2018
Christian Ray; SG	Recruit ratings: Scout: Rivals: (NR)				
Overall recruit ranking:
Note: In many cases, Scout, Rivals, 247Sports, On3, and ESPN may conflict in their listings of height and weight.; In these cases, the average was taken. ESPN grades are on a 100-point scale.; Sources: "2019 Team Ranking". Rivals.

=== 2020 recruiting class ===
College recruiting information (2020)
Name	Hometown	School	Height	Weight	Commit date
Anwar Gill; SG	Washington, D.C.	Montverde Academy	6 ft 4 in (1.93 m)	195 lb (88 kg)	Oct 5, 2019
Anwar Gill; SG	Recruit ratings: Scout: Rivals: (69)				
Overall recruit ranking:
Note: In many cases, Scout, Rivals, 247Sports, On3, and ESPN may conflict in their listings of height and weight.; In these cases, the average was taken. ESPN grades are on a 100-point scale.; Sources: "2020 Team Ranking". Rivals.

== Roster ==
2019–20 La Salle Explorers men's basketball team
Players
Coaches

Pos.	#	Name	Height	Weight	Year	Previous school	Hometown
G	0	Ayinde Hikim	5 ft 11 in (1.8 m)	165 lb (75 kg)	Fr	Mt. Zion Prep	Washington, D.C.
G	1	David Beatty	6 ft 2 in (1.88 m)	200 lb (91 kg)	Jr	Imhotep Institute Charter; South Carolina	Philadelphia, PA
G	2	Scott Spencer	6 ft 6 in (1.98 m)	205 lb (93 kg)	RS Jr	Blue Ridge; Clemson	Suffolk, VA
G	3	Christian Ray	6 ft 6 in (1.98 m)	205 lb (93 kg)	Fr	Haverford School	Gap, PA
G	4	Sherif Kenney	6 ft 4 in (1.93 m)	230 lb (104 kg)	Fr	Orr Academy	Washington, D.C.
G	5	Jack Clark	6 ft 8 in (2.03 m)	182 lb (83 kg)	So	Cheltenham	Wyncote, PA
G	10	Isiah Deas	6 ft 6 in (1.98 m)	200 lb (91 kg)	Sr	Coastal Academy (NJ)	Brooklyn, NY
F	11	Ed Croswell	6 ft 8 in (2.03 m)	250 lb (113 kg)	So	St. Joseph's Prep	Philadelphia, PA
G	12	Kyle Thompson (W) (redshirt)	5 ft 10 in (1.78 m)	150 lb (68 kg)	So	Archbishop Wood; West Chester	Horsham, PA
G	13	Saul Phiri	6 ft 4 in (1.93 m)	215 lb (98 kg)	Sr	Putnam Science Academy (CT)	Haverhill, MA
G	14	Andrew Lafond (W)	5 ft 10 in (1.78 m)	150 lb (68 kg)	So	St. Joseph's Prep	Philadelphia, PA
F/C	21	Clifton Moore (redshirt)	6 ft 10 in (2.08 m)	220 lb (100 kg)	Jr	Hatboro-Horsham; Indiana	Horsham, PA
F	23	Brandon Stone	6 ft 11 in (2.11 m)	200 lb (91 kg)	Fr	Christ School	Alverton, PA
F	24	Jared Kimbrough	6 ft 8 in (2.03 m)	220 lb (100 kg)	So	Neptune	Neptune, NJ
F	35	Moustapha Diagne	6 ft 9 in (2.06 m)	230 lb (104 kg)	RS Sr	Pope John XXIII; Western Kentucky	Rufisque, Senegal

Head coach

- Ashley Howard (Drexel)

Assistant coach(es)

- Kenny Johnson (Maryland)
- Donnie Carr (La Salle)
- Kyle Griffin (Siena)

Legend

- (C) Team captain
- (S) Suspended
- (I) Ineligible
- (W) Walk-on
- Injured
- Current redshirt

Roster
Last update: February 19, 2024

== Schedule and results ==
Date time, TV	Rank^{#}	Opponent^{#}	Result	Record	Site (attendance) city, state
Exhibition
November 2, 2019*; 4:00 pm		West Chester	W 70–63		Tom Gola Arena (874); Philadelphia, PA
Non-conference regular season
November 9, 2019*; 4:00 pm, NBCSN		Iona	W 70–64 ^{OT}	1–0	Tom Gola Arena (3,135); Philadelphia, PA
November 13, 2019*; 7:00 pm, ESPN+		at Penn; Big 5	L 59–75	1–1	Palestra (2,426); Philadelphia, PA
November 16, 2019*; 2:00 pm, ESPN+		Temple; Big 5	L 65–70	1–2	Tom Gola Arena (2,941); Philadelphia, PA
November 25, 2019*; 7:30 pm, FloHoops		vs. Murray State; Gulf Coast Showcase quarterfinals	W 75–64	2–2	Hertz Arena (1,112); Estero, FL
November 26, 2019*; 7:30 pm, FloHoops		vs. Wright State; Gulf Coast Showcase semifinals	W 72–70	3–2	Hertz Arena (738); Estero, FL
November 27, 2019*; 7:30 pm, FloHoops		vs. South Alabama; Gulf Coast Showcase championship	W 81–76 ^{OT}	4–2	Hertz Arena (413); Estero, FL
December 1, 2019*; 6:30 pm, FS1		at No. 22 Villanova; Big 5	L 72–83	4–3	Finneran Pavilion (6,501); Villanova, PA
December 7, 2019*; 2:00 pm, FloHoops		at Drexel; City 6	W 71–63	5–3	Daskalakis Athletic Center (1,066); Philadelphia, PA
December 14, 2019*; 2:00 pm, ESPN+		Morgan State	W 85–68	6–3	Tom Gola Arena (1,236); Philadelphia, PA
December 18, 2019*; 7:00 pm, ESPN+		Wagner	W 74–60	7–3	Tom Gola Arena (1,074); Philadelphia, PA
December 21, 2019*; 12:00 pm, ESPN+		Fairleigh Dickinson	W 66–58	8–3	Tom Gola Arena (1,411); Philadelphia, PA
December 28, 2019*; 2:00 pm, ESPN+		Bucknell	W 71–59	9–3	Palestra (2,558); Philadelphia, PA
Atlantic 10 regular season
January 2, 2020; 8:30 pm, CBSSN		No. 20 Dayton	L 58–84	9–4 (0–1)	Tom Gola Arena (2,241); Philadelphia, PA
January 5, 2020; 2:00 pm, ESPN+		at Fordham	W 66–60	10–4 (1–1)	Rose Hill Gymnasium (1,583); The Bronx, NY
January 8, 2020; 7:00 pm, ESPN+		at Massachusetts	L 69–77	10–5 (1–2)	Mullins Center (1,894); Amherst, MA
January 11, 2020; 2:00 pm, ESPN+		George Mason	L 63–76	10–6 (1–3)	Tom Gola Arena (1,784); Philadelphia, PA
January 18, 2020; 12:30 pm, NBCSN		at Rhode Island	L 63–66	10–7 (1–4)	Ryan Center (6,323); Kingston, RI
January 22, 2020; 7:00 pm, ESPN+		at Richmond	L 57–73	10–8 (1–5)	Robins Center (5,073); Richmond, VA
January 25, 2020; 12:00 pm, NBCSN		VCU	L 65–76	10–9 (1–6)	Tom Gola Arena (2,841); Philadelphia, PA
January 29, 2020; 8:00 pm, ESPN+		Saint Louis	L 76–77 ^{OT}	10–10 (1–7)	Tom Gola Arena (1,311); Philadelphia, PA
February 2, 2020; 2:00 pm, ESPN+		at Duquesne	L 69–71	10–11 (1–8)	PPG Paints Arena (2,450); Pittsburgh, PA
February 8, 2020; 5:00 pm, NBCSN		Saint Joseph's; Big 5	W 83–66	11–11 (2–8)	Tom Gola Arena (2,917); Philadelphia, PA
February 12, 2020; 7:00 pm, ESPN+		Richmond	L 47–74	11–12 (2–9)	Tom Gola Arena (1,271); Philadelphia, PA
February 15, 2020; 2:30 pm, NBCSN		at Saint Louis	L 69–84	11–13 (2–10)	Chaifetz Arena (7,862); St. Louis, MO
February 19, 2020; 8:00 pm, ESPN+		Fordham	W 58–49	12–13 (3–10)	Tom Gola Arena (1,311); Philadelphia, PA
January 22, 2020; 4:00 pm, ESPN+		at George Washington	W 72–62	13–13 (4–10)	Charles E. Smith Center (4,019); Washington, D.C.
February 25, 2020; 7:00 pm, ESPN+		at Davidson	L 49–74	13–14 (4–11)	John M. Belk Arena (2,888); Davidson, NC
February 29, 2020; 2:00 pm, ESPN+		St. Bonaventure	W 73–65	14–14 (5–11)	Tom Gola Arena (2,374); Philadelphia, PA
March 4, 2020; 7:00 pm, ESPN+		Massachusetts	L 64–75	14–15 (5–12)	Tom Gola Arena (1,352); Philadelphia, PA
March 7, 2020; 2:00 pm, ESPN+		at Saint Joseph's	W 78-77	15-15 (6-12)	Hagan Arena (2,390); Philadelphia, PA
Atlantic 10 tournament
March 12, 2020; 6:00 pm, NBCSN	(10)	vs. (7) Davidson; Second round	A-10 tournament canceled		Barclays Center; Brooklyn, NY
*Non-conference game. ^{#}Rankings from AP poll. (#) Tournament seedings in parentheses. All times are in Eastern Time.
