= 2019–20 George Mason Patriots men's basketball team =

American college basketball season

2019–20 George Mason Patriots men's basketball

Cayman Islands Classic champions
- Conference: Atlantic 10 Conference
- Record: 17–15 (5–13 A-10)
- Head coach: Dave Paulsen (5th season)
- Assistant coaches: Duane Simpkins; Pete Hutchins; Bryson Johnson
- Home arena: EagleBank Arena

2019–20 Atlantic 10 men's basketball standings
	Conf.				Overall
Team	W		L	PCT	W		L	PCT
No. 3 Dayton	18	–	0	1.000	29	–	2	.935
Richmond	14	–	4	.778	24	–	7	.774
Rhode Island	13	–	5	.722	21	–	9	.700
Saint Louis	12	–	6	.667	23	–	8	.742
St. Bonaventure	11	–	7	.611	19	–	12	.613
Duquesne	11	–	7	.611	21	–	9	.700
Davidson	10	–	8	.556	16	–	14	.533
Massachusetts	8	–	10	.444	14	–	17	.452
VCU	8	–	10	.444	18	–	13	.581
La Salle	6	–	12	.333	15	–	15	.500
George Washington	6	–	12	.333	12	–	20	.375
George Mason	5	–	13	.278	17	–	15	.531
Saint Joseph's	2	–	16	.111	6	–	26	.188
Fordham	2	–	16	.111	9	–	22	.290
Note: The 2020 A-10 tournament was canceled after the first round due to the COVID-19 pandemic. Rankings from AP poll

The 2019–20 George Mason Patriots Men's basketball team represented George Mason University during the 2019–20 NCAA Division I men's basketball season. The season marked the 54th for the program, the fifth under head coach Dave Paulsen, and the seventh as members of the Atlantic 10 Conference. The Patriots played their home games at EagleBank Arena in Fairfax, Virginia.

== Previous season ==
They finished last season 18–15, 11–7 in A-10 play to finish in fifth place. As the No. 5 seed in the A-10 tournament, they defeated GW in the second round before losing to St. Bonaventure in the quarterfinals.

== Offseason ==
=== Departures ===
Name	Number	Pos.	Height	Weight	Year	Hometown	Notes
Otis Livingston II	4	G	5'11"	172	Senior	Linden, NJ	Graduated
Logan Samuels	13	G	6'1"	185	Senior	Bowie, MD	Graduated
Nick Diclementi	24	G	6'6"	208	Senior	Leesburg, VA	Graduated

=== 2019 recruiting class ===
College recruiting information
Name	Hometown	School	Height	Weight	Commit date
Josh Oduro; PF	Gainesville, VA	Paul VI High School	6 ft 9 in (2.06 m)	N/A	Aug 19, 2018
Josh Oduro; PF	Recruit ratings: Scout:				
Xavier Johnson; PG	Germantown, MD	Episcopal High School	6 ft 0 in (1.83 m)	165 lb (75 kg)	Sep 22, 2018
Xavier Johnson; PG	Recruit ratings: Scout:				
Overall recruit ranking:
Note: In many cases, Scout, Rivals, 247Sports, On3, and ESPN may conflict in their listings of height and weight.; In these cases, the average was taken. ESPN grades are on a 100-point scale.; Sources: "ESPN". ESPN.; "2019 Team Ranking". Rivals.

== Roster ==
2019–20 George Mason Patriots men's basketball team
Players
Coaches

Pos.	#	Name	Height	Weight	Year	Previous school	Hometown
F	0	Goanar Mar	6 ft 7 in (2.01 m)	214 lb (97 kg)	Jr	DeLaSalle High School	Mankato, MN
G	1	Justin Kier (injured)	6 ft 4 in (1.93 m)	197 lb (89 kg)	Sr	Spotswood High School	Grottoes, VA
G	2	Xavier Johnson	6 ft 1 in (1.85 m)	182 lb (83 kg)	Fr	Episcopal High School	Germantown, MD
G	3	Bahaïde Haïdara (injured)	6 ft 6 in (1.98 m)	201 lb (91 kg)	Fr	Dawson College	Montréal, Canada
G	10	Jamal Hartwell II	5 ft 10 in (1.78 m)	155 lb (70 kg)	So	Fairfax High School	Inglewood, CA
G	11	Jordan Miller	6 ft 6 in (1.98 m)	189 lb (86 kg)	So	Loudoun Valley High School	Middleburg, VA
F	12	A. J. Wilson	6 ft 7 in (2.01 m)	210 lb (95 kg)	RS Jr	Elev8 Prep Academy	Laurel, MD
F	13	Josh Oduro	6 ft 9 in (2.06 m)	237 lb (108 kg)	Fr	Paul VI High School	Gainesville, VA
G	20	Jason Douglas-Stanley	6 ft 2 in (1.88 m)	191 lb (87 kg)	So	Mount Vernon High School	Mount Vernon, NY
G	21	Jack Tempchin (W)	5 ft 9 in (1.75 m)	158 lb (72 kg)	RS Jr	Blake High School	Silver Spring, MD
G	22	Mehki McCray (W)	6 ft 1 in (1.85 m)	194 lb (88 kg)	Jr	St. Charles High School	Waldorf, MD
G	23	Javon Greene	6 ft 2 in (1.88 m)	190 lb (86 kg)	Jr	Henry County High School	McDonough, GA
F	30	Chance Konnor (W)	6 ft 11 in (2.11 m)	235 lb (107 kg)	Jr	South Lakes High School	Reston, VA
G	32	Ian Boyd (injured)	6 ft 4 in (1.93 m)	215 lb (98 kg)	Sr	Apex High School	Apex, NC
F	33	Greg Calixte	6 ft 8 in (2.03 m)	227 lb (103 kg)	Jr	Mount Vernon High School	Mount Vernon, NY

Head coach

- Dave Paulsen (Williams)

Assistant coach(es)

- Duane Simpkins (Maryland)
- Pete Hutchins (Plymouth State)
- Bryson Johnson (Bucknell)

Legend

- (C) Team captain
- (S) Suspended
- (I) Ineligible
- (W) Walk-on
- Injured
- Current redshirt

Roster

== Player statistics ==
Player	GP	GS	MPG	FG%	3FG%	FT%	RPG	APG	SPG	BPG	PPG
Javon Greene	31	28	32.2	.397	.339	.815	5.6	2.6	1.8	0.2	13.8
Jordan Miller	32	32	32.4	.448	.330	.701	5.3	1.4	1.1	0.2	12.7
A.J. Wilson	32	30	27.8	.455	.326	.603	7.4	1.0	0.6	2.9	12.2
Jamal Hartwell II	29	18	29.0	.382	.311	.800	1.8	1.7	0.3	0.0	9.6
Justin Kier	9	2	22.6	.464	.458	.846	3.6	1.3	0.7	0.2	9.6
Xavier Johnson	32	18	29.3	.416	.220	.719	3.7	2.5	1.3	0.0	7.1
Josh Oduro	32	18	16.9	.481	.154	.609	3.9	0.3	0.3	0.8	4.9
Greg Calixte	29	12	13.1	.574	.000	.333	3.2	0.5	0.3	0.3	2.9
Goanar Mar	32	2	15.3	.321	.074	.700	2.1	0.6	0.3	0.3	2.4
Jason Douglas-Stanley	17	0	5.1	.179	.227	.750	0.5	0.2	0.1	0.0	1.1
Bahaïde Haïdara	2	0	7.5	.000	.000	.000	3.0	1.5	0.0	0.0	0.0
Jack Tempchin	5	0	1.2	.000	.000	.000	0.3	0.0	0.0	0.0	0.0
Mehki McCray	4	0	0.8	.000	.000	.000	0.0	0.0	0.0	0.0	0.0

== Schedule and results ==
Date time, TV	Rank^{#}	Opponent^{#}	Result	Record	High points	High rebounds	High assists	Site (attendance) city, state
Exhibition
October 30, 2019*; 7:00 pm, ESPN+		Catholic	W 74–33		18 – Hartwell II	10 – Miller	2 – 4 players	EagleBank Arena (1,433); Fairfax, VA
Non-conference regular season
November 5, 2019*; 7:00 pm, ESPN+		Navy	W 68–55 ^{OT}	1–0	15 – Johnson, Wilson	11 – Wilson	5 – Greene	EagleBank Arena (5,620); Fairfax, VA
November 8, 2019*; 7:00 pm, ESPN+		Longwood	W 76–65	2–0	19 – Hartwell II	6 – Greene	3 – Johnson	EagleBank Arena (5,113); Fairfax, VA
November 13, 2019*; 7:00 pm, ESPN+		LIU	W 80–74	3–0	25 – Miller	8 – Greene	3 – Hartwell II	EagleBank Arena (2,432); Fairfax, VA
November 16, 2019*; 7:00 pm, MASN		James Madison; A10–CAA Challenge	W 83–70	4–0	18 – Hartwell II	12 – Wilson	4 – Wilson	EagleBank Arena (4,410); Fairfax, VA
November 19, 2019*; 7:00 pm, ESPN+		Loyola (MD); Cayman Islands Classic Opening Round	W 65–61	5–0	23 – Miller	11 – Wilson	4 – Hartwell II	EagleBank Arena (2,445); Fairfax, VA
November 22, 2019*; 7:00 pm, BTN		at No. 6 Maryland	L 63–86	5–1	19 – Wilson	7 – Greene	4 – Greene	Xfinity Center (14,499); College Park, MD
November 25, 2019*; 5:00 pm, FloSports		vs. Old Dominion; Cayman Islands Classic quarterfinals	W 60–53	6–1	19 – Greene	9 – Wilson	3 – Hartwell II	John Gray Gymnasium (714); George Town, Cayman Islands
November 26, 2019*; 7:30 pm, FloSports		vs. Nebraska; Cayman Islands Classic semifinals	W 85–66	7–1	23 – Hartwell II	14 – Wilson	6 – Hartwell II	John Gray Gymnasium (1,066); George Town, Cayman Islands
November 27, 2019*; 7:30 pm, FloSports		vs. New Mexico State; Cayman Islands Classic championship	W 68–64	8–1	17 – Hartwell II	14 – Wilson	3 – Johnson	John Gray Gymnasium (1,492); George Town, Cayman Islands
December 3, 2019*; 7:00 pm, ESPN+		Jacksonville State	W 67–60	9–1	19 – Miller	9 – Greene	8 – Johnson	EagleBank Arena (2,652); Fairfax, VA
December 7, 2019*; 7:00 pm, MASN2		American	W 68–53	10–1	14 – Kier	9 – Johnson	2 – Greene	EagleBank Arena (3,656); Fairfax, VA
December 21, 2019*; 4:00 pm, MASN		UMBC	W 69–53	11–1	17 – Miller	14 – Wilson	5 – Greene	EagleBank Arena (3,458); Fairfax, VA
December 30, 2019*; 9:00 pm, MASN		at TCU	L 53–87	11–2	15 – Miller	8 – Oduro	5 – Kier	Schollmaier Arena (5,992); Fort Worth, TX
A-10 regular season
January 5, 2020; 12:00 pm, NBCSN		VCU; Rivalry	L 59–72	11–3 (0–1)	13 – Greene	5 – Kier	4 – Greene	EagleBank Arena (6,513); Fairfax, VA
January 8, 2020; 7:00 pm, Stadium		St. Bonaventure	L 49–61	11–4 (0–2)	11 – Kier, Wilson	6 – Wilson	3 – 3 players	EagleBank Arena (2,511); Fairfax, VA
January 11, 2020; 2:00 pm, ESPN+		at La Salle	W 76–63	12–4 (1–2)	18 – Kier	8 – Wilson	4 – Johnson	Tom Gola Arena (1,784); Philadelphia, PA
January 15, 2020; 7:00 pm, ESPN+		at George Washington; Revolutionary Rivalry	L 67–73	12–5 (1–3)	18 – Wilson	11 – Wilson	4 – Greene	Charles E. Smith Center (3,089); Washington, D.C.
January 18, 2020; 2:30 pm, NBCSN		Richmond	L 87–97	12–6 (1–4)	39 – Greene	8 – Wilson	4 – Greene, Johnson	EagleBank Arena (4,603); Fairfax, VA
January 22, 2020; 7:00 pm, ESPN+		Massachusetts	W 73–63	13–6 (2–4)	32 – Greene	12 – Wilson	3 – Johnson	EagleBank Arena (2,652); Fairfax, VA
January 25, 2020; 6:00 pm, CBSSN		at Davidson	L 53–68	13–7 (2–5)	18 – Wilson	9 – Calixte	4 – Greene	John M. Belk Arena (4,394); Davidson, NC
January 28, 2020; 7:00 pm, Stadium		Rhode Island	L 64–78	13–8 (2–6)	23 – Wilson	9 – Wilson	5 – Johnson	EagleBank Arena (3,140); Fairfax, VA
February 1, 2020; 4:00 pm, Stadium		at St. Bonaventure	L 65–74	13–9 (2–7)	17 – Greene	8 – Miller, Wilson	4 – Miller	Reilly Center (5,440); Olean, NY
February 9, 2020; 2:30 pm, NBCSN		at Massachusetts	L 67–69	13–10 (2–8)	19 – Greene	7 – Oduro	3 – Hartwell II	Mullins Center (2,313); Amherst, MA
February 12, 2020; 7:00 pm, ESPNU		at VCU; Rivalry	W 72–67	14–10 (3–8)	14 – Wilson	11 – Wilson	4 – Hartwell II, Johnson	Siegel Center (7,637); Richmond, VA
February 15, 2020; 4:30 pm, NBCSN		George Washington; Revolutionary Rivalry	L 67–73	14–11 (3–9)	15 – Wilson	11 – Oduro	3 – Greene	EagleBank Arena (6,015); Fairfax, VA
February 19, 2020; 7:00 pm, ESPN+		at Richmond	L 50–65	14–12 (3–10)	11 – Greene, Miller	9 – Miller	3 – Johnson	Robins Center (5,651); Richmond, VA
February 22, 2020; 4:30 pm, NBCSN		Saint Joseph's; Homecoming	W 62–55	15–12 (4–10)	20 – Greene	8 – Greene	4 – Miller	EagleBank Arena (5,649); Fairfax, VA
February 25, 2020; 7:00 pm, Stadium		No. 4 Dayton	L 55–62	15–13 (4–11)	18 – Wilson	10 – Miller	3 – Johnson	EagleBank Arena (4,703); Fairfax, VA
February 29, 2020; 7:00 pm		at Duquesne	L 78–81	15–14 (4–12)	19 – Miller	11 – Miller	4 – Hartwell II	UPMC Events Center (2,292); Moon Township, PA
March 4, 2020; 7:00 pm, ESPN+		Saint Louis	L 57–69	15–15 (4–13)	13 – Miller	5 – Greene, Miller	3 – Johnson	EagleBank Arena (3,062); Fairfax, VA
March 7, 2020; 2:00 pm, ESPN+		at Fordham	W 65–61	16–15 (5–13)	19 – Greene	10 – Wilson	4 – Greene, Miller	Rose Hill Gymnasium (1,884); Bronx, NY
A-10 tournament
March 11, 2020; 1:00 pm, ESPN+	(12)	vs. (13) Saint Joseph's; First round	W 77–70	17–15	24 – Wilson	9 – Greene, Wilson	4 – Johnson	Barclays Center; Brooklyn, NY
March 12, 2020; 2:30 pm, NBCSN	(12)	vs. (5) St. Bonaventure; Second round	A10 Tournament Canceled					Barclays Center; Brooklyn, NY
*Non-conference game. ^{#}Rankings from AP Poll. (#) Tournament seedings in parentheses. All times are in Eastern Time.
