= 2019–20 Fordham Rams men's basketball team =

American college basketball season

2019–20 Fordham Rams men's basketball
- Conference: Atlantic 10
- Record: 9–22 (2–16 A-10)
- Head coach: Jeff Neubauer (5th season)
- Assistant coaches: Michael DePaoli; Anthony Evans; Dennis Felton
- Home arena: Rose Hill Gymnasium

2019–20 Atlantic 10 men's basketball standings
	Conf.				Overall
Team	W		L	PCT	W		L	PCT
No. 3 Dayton	18	–	0	1.000	29	–	2	.935
Richmond	14	–	4	.778	24	–	7	.774
Rhode Island	13	–	5	.722	21	–	9	.700
Saint Louis	12	–	6	.667	23	–	8	.742
St. Bonaventure	11	–	7	.611	19	–	12	.613
Duquesne	11	–	7	.611	21	–	9	.700
Davidson	10	–	8	.556	16	–	14	.533
Massachusetts	8	–	10	.444	14	–	17	.452
VCU	8	–	10	.444	18	–	13	.581
La Salle	6	–	12	.333	15	–	15	.500
George Washington	6	–	12	.333	12	–	20	.375
George Mason	5	–	13	.278	17	–	15	.531
Saint Joseph's	2	–	16	.111	6	–	26	.188
Fordham	2	–	16	.111	9	–	22	.290
Note: The 2020 A-10 tournament was canceled after the first round due to the COVID-19 pandemic. Rankings from AP poll

The 2019–20 Fordham Rams men's basketball team represented Fordham University during the 2019–20 NCAA Division I men's basketball season. The Rams, led by fifth-year head coach Jeff Neubauer, played their home games at Rose Hill Gymnasium in The Bronx, New York as a member of the Atlantic 10 Conference.

== Previous season ==
The Rams finished the 2018–19 season 12–20, 3–15 in A-10 play to finish in last place. They lost in the first round of the A-10 tournament to Richmond.

=== Departures ===
Name	Number	Pos.	Height	Weight	Year	Hometown	Reason for departure
Chris Downing	14	F	6'8"	235	Senior	Orangeburg, NY	Graduated
Jesse Bunting	21	F	6'8"	225	Senior	Plymouth, MA	Graduated
Prokop Slanina	24	F	6'10"	225	Senior	Brno, Czech Republic	Graduated
David Pekárek	33	F	6'7"	210	Senior	Olomouc, Czech Republic	Graduated

=== Incoming transfers ===
Name	Number	Pos.	Height	Weight	Year	Hometown	Previous School
Josh Colon	21	G	5'10"	160	Junior	Carolina, PR	Junior college transferred from Salt Lake CC

=== 2019 recruiting class ===
College recruiting information
Name	Hometown	School	Height	Weight	Commit date
Joel Soriano; C	White Plains, NY	Archbishop Stepinac High School	6 ft 10 in (2.08 m)	190 lb (86 kg)	Apr 28, 2018
Joel Soriano; C	Recruit ratings: Scout: Rivals: (N/A)				
Overall recruit ranking:
Note: In many cases, Scout, Rivals, 247Sports, On3, and ESPN may conflict in their listings of height and weight.; In these cases, the average was taken. ESPN grades are on a 100-point scale.; Sources: "2019 Team Ranking". Rivals.

== Roster ==
2019–20 Fordham Rams men's basketball team
Players
Coaches

Pos.	#	Name	Height	Weight	Year	Previous school	Hometown
G	0	Cameron Cohn	6 ft 4 in (1.93 m)	175 lb (79 kg)	Fr	Second Baptist School	Houston, Texas
F	1	Chuba Ohams	6 ft 9 in (2.06 m)	210 lb (95 kg)	RS Jr	Wadleigh High School	Bronx, New York
G	2	Jalen Cobb	6 ft 0 in (1.83 m)	165 lb (75 kg)	So	Columbia High School	Atlanta, Georgia
G	3	Kyle Rose	6 ft 3 in (1.91 m)	185 lb (84 kg)	Fr	Eleanor Roosevelt	Upper Marlboro, Maryland
G	4	Erten Gazi	6 ft 3 in (1.91 m)	205 lb (93 kg)	RS Sr	Istanbul Bostanci Doga College; DePaul	Güzelyurt, Cyprus
G	5	Chris Austin	6 ft 4 in (1.93 m)	205 lb (93 kg)	So	Maranatha High School	Pasadena, California
G	10	Ty Perry	6 ft 3 in (1.91 m)	215 lb (98 kg)	So	Woodstock Academy	Boston, Massachusetts
F	12	Luka Radovich (W)	6 ft 5 in (1.96 m)	200 lb (91 kg)	So	Cresskill High School	Cresskill, New Jersey
G	13	Antwon Portley	6 ft 4 in (1.93 m)	195 lb (88 kg)	RS Sr	Lancaster High School; Saint Peter's	Lancaster, Texas
G	15	Mason Williams (W)	6 ft 4 in (1.93 m)	184 lb (83 kg)	So	William Penn Charter School	Philadelphia, Pennsylvania
F	20	Ivan Raut	6 ft 7 in (2.01 m)	204 lb (93 kg)	Jr	None	Kotor, Montenegro
G	21	Josh Colon	5 ft 10 in (1.78 m)	170 lb (77 kg)	Jr	Blue Ridge High School; Salt Lake Community College	Carolina, Puerto Rico
F	22	Joel Soriano	6 ft 11 in (2.11 m)	250 lb (113 kg)	Fr	Stepinac	Yonkers, New York
G	23	Lazar Skoric	6 ft 3 in (1.91 m)	190 lb (86 kg)	So		Belgrade, Serbia
G	25	Alec Rodriguez (W)	5 ft 10 in (1.78 m)	170 lb (77 kg)	Fr	Belen Jesuit	Miami, Florida
F	30	Onyi Eyisi	6 ft 9 in (2.06 m)	225 lb (102 kg)	So	Prolific Prep Academy	Napa Valley, California
G	45	Peter Burquest	6 ft 1 in (1.85 m)	165 lb (75 kg)	Jr	St. Xavier	Cincinnati, Ohio

Head coach

- Jeff Neubauer (La Salle)

Assistant coach(es)

- Michael DePaoli (College of Saint Rose)
- Anthony Evans (St. Thomas Aquinas)
- Dennis Felton (Howard)

Legend

- (C) Team captain
- (S) Suspended
- (I) Ineligible
- (W) Walk-on
- Injured
- Current redshirt

Roster

== Schedule and results ==
Date time, TV	Rank^{#}	Opponent^{#}	Result	Record	Site (attendance) city, state
Exhibition
Oct 29, 2019*; 7:00 pm		College of Staten Island	W 91–65		Rose Hill Gymnasium (452); Bronx, NY
Non-conference regular season
Nov 5, 2019*; 9:30 pm, ESPN+		St. Francis Brooklyn	W 68–59	1–0	Rose Hill Gymnasium (3,200); Bronx, NY
Nov 13, 2019*; 7:00 pm, ESPN+		Fairleigh Dickinson	W 53–50	2–0	Rose Hill Gymnasium (1,463); Bronx, NY
Nov 16, 2019*; 7:00 pm, ESPN+		Marist	W 58–41	3–0	Rose Hill Gymnasium (1,770); Bronx, NY
Nov 22, 2019*; 4:15 pm, FloSports		vs. Nevada; Paradise Jam tournament quarterfinals	L 60–74	3–1	Sports and Fitness Center (1,524); Saint Thomas, U.S. Virgin Islands
Nov 23, 2019*; 3:00 pm, FloSports		vs. Grand Canyon; Paradise Jam Tournament consolation 2nd round	W 70–58	4–1	Sports and Fitness Center; Saint Thomas, U.S. Virgin Islands
Nov 25, 2019*; 6:00 pm, FloSports		vs. Western Kentucky; Paradise Jam Tournament 5th place game	L 64–69	4–2	Sports and Fitness Center (924); Saint Thomas, U.S. Virgin Islands
Dec 1, 2019*; 2:00 pm, ESPN+		Maryland Eastern Shore	W 66–45	5–2	Rose Hill Gymnasium (1,482); Bronx, NY
Dec 7, 2019*; 2:00 pm, ESPN+		Manhattan; Battle of the Bronx	L 53–54 ^{OT}	5–3	Rose Hill Gymnasium (2,298); Bronx, NY
Dec 10, 2019*; 12:00 pm, ESPN+		Bryant	L 61–69	5–4	Rose Hill Gymnasium (3,200); Bronx, NY
Dec 15, 2019*; 2:00 pm, ESPN+		Tennessee State	L 61–66	5–5	Rose Hill Gymnasium (1,524); Bronx, NY
Dec 20, 2019*; 7:00 pm, ESPN+		James Madison	L 69–75	5–6	Rose Hill Gymnasium (1,510); Bronx, NY
Dec 30, 2019*; 7:00 pm, ESPN+		Coppin State	W 62–56	6–6	Rose Hill Gymnasium (1,548); Bronx, NY
Atlantic 10 regular season
Jan 2, 2020; 7:00 pm, ESPN+		at VCU	L 46–64	6–7 (0–1)	Siegel Center (7,637); Richmond, VA
Jan 5, 2020; 2:00 pm, ESPN+		La Salle	L 60–66	6–8 (0–2)	Rose Hill Gymnasium (1,583); Bronx, NY
Jan 11, 2020; 2:00 pm, ESPN+		at St. Bonaventure	L 44–64	6–9 (0–3)	Reilly Center (3,848); Olean, NY
Jan 15, 2020; 7:00 pm, ESPN+		at Duquesne	L 56–58 ^{OT}	6–10 (0–4)	PPG Paints Arena (2,356); Pittsburgh, PA
Jan 19, 2020; 12:00 pm, CBSSN		Davidson	L 62–74	6–11 (0–5)	Rose Hill Gymnasium (1,936); The Bronx, NY
Jan 22, 2020; 7:00 pm, ESPN+		George Washington	W 59–54	7–11 (1–5)	Rose Hill Gymnasium (1,700); The Bronx, NY
Jan 26, 2020; 3:00 pm, ESPN+		at Saint Louis	L 39–55	7–12 (1–6)	Chaifetz Arena (6,842); St. Louis, MO
Jan 29, 2020; 7:00 pm, ESPN+		St. Bonaventure	L 55–62 ^{OT}	7–13 (1–7)	Rose Hill Gymnasium (2,101); The Bronx, NY
Feb 1, 2020; 4:30 pm, NBCSN		at No. 7 Dayton	L 56–70	7–14 (1–8)	UD Arena (13,407); Dayton, OH
Feb 8, 2020; 2:00 pm, ESPN+		Richmond	L 53–59	7–15 (1–9)	Rose Hill Gymnasium (2,117); Bronx, NY
Feb 11, 2020; 7:00 pm, ESPN+		at Davidson	L 49–79	7–16 (1–10)	John M. Belk Arena (3,341); Davidson, NC
Feb 16, 2020; 2:00 pm, NBCSN		Duquesne	L 54–59	7–17 (1–11)	Rose Hill Gymnasium (1,576); Bronx, NY
Feb 19, 2020; 8:00 pm, ESPN+		at La Salle	L 49–58	7–18 (1–12)	Tom Gola Arena (1,311); Philadelphia, PA
Feb 22, 2020; 4:00 pm, ESPN+		Massachusetts	L 49–57	7–19 (1–13)	Rose Hill Gymnasium (1,560); Bronx, NY
Feb 26, 2020; 7:00 pm, ESPN+		Rhode Island	L 75–76	7–20 (1–14)	Rose Hill Gymnasium (1,588); Bronx, NY
Jan 29, 2020; 1:00 pm, ESPN+		at Saint Joseph's	L 69–73	7–21 (1–15)	Hagan Arena (2,257); Philadelphia, PA
Mar 4, 2020; 7:00 pm, ESPN+		at George Washington	W 63–52	8–21 (2–15)	Charles E. Smith Center (2,365); Washington, D.C.
Mar 7, 2020; 2:00 pm, ESPN+		George Mason	L 61–65	8–22 (2–16)	Rose Hill Gymnasium (1,884); Bronx, NY
Atlantic 10 tournament
March 11, 2020; 3:30 pm, ESPN+	(14)	vs. (11) George Washington; First Round	W 72–52	9–22	Barclays Center; Brooklyn, NY
March 12, 2020; 8:30 pm, NBCSN	(14)	vs. (6) Duquesne; Second Round	A10 Tournament Canceled		Barclays Center; Brooklyn, NY
*Non-conference game. ^{#}Rankings from AP Poll. (#) Tournament seedings in parentheses. All times are in Eastern Time.

== See also ==
- 2019–20 Fordham Rams women's basketball team
