= Billy Lange =

American basketball coach (born 1972)

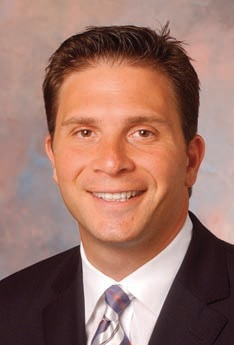

New York Knicks
- Position: Assistant coach
- League: NBA

Personal information
- Born: February 11, 1972 (age 54) Haddon Heights, New Jersey, U.S.

Career information
- High school: Bishop Eustace (Pennsauken Township, New Jersey)
- College: Rowan (1990–1994)
- Coaching career: 1996–present

Career history

Coaching
- 1996–1998: Philadelphia (assistant)
- 1998–1999: La Salle (assistant)
- 1999–2001: U. S. Merchant Marine Academy
- 2001–2004: Villanova (assistant)
- 2004–2011: Navy
- 2011–2013: Villanova (associate HC)
- 2013–2019: Philadelphia 76ers (assistant)
- 2019–2025: Saint Joseph's
- 2025–present: New York Knicks (assistant)

Career highlights
- As head coach: 2× Skyline Conference regular season champion (2000, 2001); Skyline Conference tournament champion (2001); Patriot League Coach of the Year (2008); As assistant coach: NBA champion (2026); NBA Cup champion (2025)

William Lange (born February 11, 1972) is an American basketball coach who currently serves as an assistant coach for the New York Knicks of the National Basketball Association (NBA). He previously served as the head men's basketball coach for the Navy Midshipmen and the Saint Joseph's Hawks.

== High school ==
Born in Haddon Heights, New Jersey, Lange played high school basketball at Bishop Eustace Preparatory School in Pennsauken Township, New Jersey and then played collegiately at Rowan University. He started his coaching career with a single season at his alma mater, Bishop Eustace, replacing his father in the role.

== Coaching career ==
In 1996, Lange began his collegiate coaching career as an assistant under Naismith Basketball Hall of Fame coach Herb Magee at Philadelphia University. After two seasons with Magee, Lange moved on to Division I ball, going crosstown and earning an assistant coaching job at La Salle University in 1998. While at La Salle, Lange helped the Explorers earn a 13–15 record during the 1998–99 season before being offered the head job at the United States Merchant Marine Academy in Kings Point, New York.

Lange's first two years of collegiate head coaching were extremely successful. In his first season, Lange guided his Mariners to a 1999–2000 Skyline Conference regular season title and came up a game short in making the Division III NCAA Tournament, losing in the Skyline Conference tournament. However, the squad earned a record of 17–11, including a 13–3 mark in conference. Lange's second year at USMMA, however, would prove to be historic, as his team compiled a 22–8 record, including 15–1 in-conference. The 2000–01 Mariners won both the regular season and conference tournament championships, and made it all the way to the Division III Sweet 16, the first time a USMMA team had ever advanced beyond the first round of the tournament.

Lange returned to Division I ball when he accepted an assistant coaching position at Villanova University. From 2001 to 2004, Billy worked under Jay Wright, while the Villanova Wildcasts enjoyed great success.

Lange earned his first Division I head coaching assignment in 2004 as he became the coach at the United States Naval Academy in Annapolis, Maryland. Lange inherited a team that had gone only 5–23 the previous year. His teams showed improvement on the court, including a 16–14 record in 2007–08, the school's first winning season in seven years and a 19–11 mark in 2008–09.

Lange left his post at Navy to rejoin Wright as his associate head coach on May 9, 2011. After two seasons at Villanova, Lange was hired by the Philadelphia 76ers as a player development coach for the 2013–14 season. Prior to joining Brett Brown's staff, Lange reportedly turned down a head coaching opportunity with the Rio Grande Valley Vipers, the NBA Development League, or D-League, affiliate of the Houston Rockets.

While with the Sixers, Lange elevated into a lead assistant with roles that included player development and coordinating the team's offense. Lange left his position with the 76ers to be the men's basketball head coach at Saint Joseph's University on March 28, 2019. He was hired to replace Phil Martelli after 24 years at head coach of Saint Joseph's.

On September 10, 2025, the New York Knicks hired Lange as an assistant coach.

== Personal life ==
Lange has a wife, Alicia, and four sons, Will, Matt, Marcus, and Jacob.

== Head coaching record ==
Record table
Season	Team	Overall	Conference	Standing	Postseason
Merchant Marine Academy Mariners (Skyline Conference) (1999–2001)
1999–00	USMMA	17–11	13–3	1st	
2000–01	USMMA	22–8	15–1	1st	NCAA Division III Sweet 16
USMMA:		39–19 (.672)	28–4 (.875)		
Navy Midshipmen (Patriot League) (2004–2011)
2004–05	Navy	10–18	5–9	T–6th	
2005–06	Navy	10–18	3–11	7th	
2006–07	Navy	14–16	4–10	T–6th	
2007–08	Navy	16–14	9–5	2nd	
2008–09	Navy	19–11	8–6	3rd	
2009–10	Navy	13–17	7–7	T–4th	
2010–11	Navy	11–20	6–8	T–4th	
Navy:		93–114 (.449)	42–56 (.429)		
Saint Joseph's Hawks (Atlantic 10 Conference) (2019–2025)
2019–20	Saint Joseph's	6–26	2–16	T–13th	
2020–21	Saint Joseph's	5–15	3–9	13th	
2021–22	Saint Joseph's	11–19	5–13	T–12th	
2022–23	Saint Joseph's	16–17	8–10	T–8th	
2023–24	Saint Joseph's	21–14	9–9	T–7th	NIT First Round
2024–25	Saint Joseph's	22–13	11–7	T–5th	NIT First Round
Saint Joseph's:		81–104 (.438)	38–64 (.373)		
Total:		213–237 (.473)			
National champion Postseason invitational champion Conference regular season champion Conference regular season and conference tournament champion Division regular season champion Division regular season and conference tournament champion Conference tournament champion
