= 2019–20 St. Bonaventure Bonnies men's basketball team =

American college basketball season

2019–20 St. Bonaventure Bonnies men's basketball
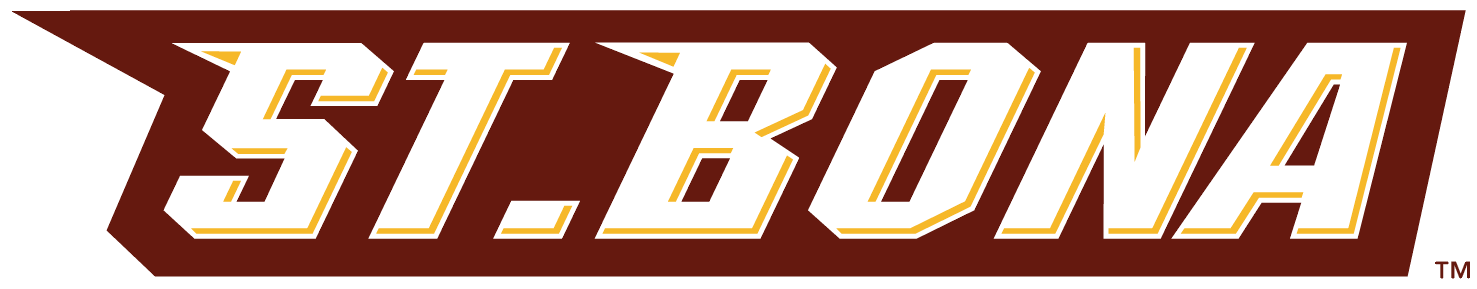

Boca Beach Classic Hall of Fame Bracket champions
- Conference: Atlantic 10 Conference
- Record: 19–12 (11–7 A-10)
- Head coach: Mark Schmidt (13th season)
- Assistant coaches: Steve Curran; Tray Woodall; Sean Neal
- Home arena: Reilly Center

2019–20 Atlantic 10 men's basketball standings
	Conf.				Overall
Team	W		L	PCT	W		L	PCT
No. 3 Dayton	18	–	0	1.000	29	–	2	.935
Richmond	14	–	4	.778	24	–	7	.774
Rhode Island	13	–	5	.722	21	–	9	.700
Saint Louis	12	–	6	.667	23	–	8	.742
St. Bonaventure	11	–	7	.611	19	–	12	.613
Duquesne	11	–	7	.611	21	–	9	.700
Davidson	10	–	8	.556	16	–	14	.533
Massachusetts	8	–	10	.444	14	–	17	.452
VCU	8	–	10	.444	18	–	13	.581
La Salle	6	–	12	.333	15	–	15	.500
George Washington	6	–	12	.333	12	–	20	.375
George Mason	5	–	13	.278	17	–	15	.531
Saint Joseph's	2	–	16	.111	6	–	26	.188
Fordham	2	–	16	.111	9	–	22	.290
Note: The 2020 A-10 tournament was canceled after the first round due to the COVID-19 pandemic. Rankings from AP poll

The 2019–20 St. Bonaventure Bonnies men's basketball team represented St. Bonaventure University during the 2019–20 NCAA Division I men's basketball season. The Bonnies, led by 13th-year head coach Mark Schmidt, played their home games at the Reilly Center in Olean, New York as members of the Atlantic 10 Conference. They finished the season 19–12, 11–7 in A-10 play to finish in a tie for fifth place. Their season ended when the A-10 tournament and all other postseason tournaments were canceled due to the ongoing coronavirus pandemic.

== Previous season ==
The Bonnies finished the 2018–19 season 18–16, 12–6 in A-10 play to finish in fourth place. In the A-10 tournament, they defeated George Mason and Rhode Island before losing in the championship game to Saint Louis. The Bonnies did not participate in a postseason tournament.

== Offseason ==
=== Departures ===
Name	Number	Pos.	Height	Weight	Year	Hometown	Reason for departure
Nelson Kaputo	4	G	6'0"	175	Senior	Toronto, ON	Graduated
Tshiefu Ngalakulondi	5	F	6'7"	220	Sophomore	Manchester, MA	Transferred to Fairfield
Courtney Stockard	11	F	6'5"	205	RS Senior	St. Louis, MO	Graduated
Melkisedek Moreaux	12	F	6'8"	210	Junior	Hamburg, Germany	Transferred to Mercyhurst
LaDarien Griffin	15	F	6'6"	215	Senior	Jacksonville, FL	Graduated
Jalen Poyser	23	G	6'4"	180	RS Junior	Malton, ON	Graduate transferred to McNeese State
Jack Galatio	24	G	5'10"	165	Junior	Hornell, NY	Walk-on; transferred to Clarion

=== Incoming transfers ===
Name	Number	Pos.	Height	Weight	Year	Hometown	Previous School
Matt Johnson	4	G	6'4"	180	Junior	Baltimore, MD	Junior college transferred from Howard College.
Jaren Holmes	5	G	6'4"	205	Sophomore	Romulus, MI	Junior college transferred from Ranger College.
Jalen Adaway	33	G	6'5"	200	Junior	Logansport, IN	Transferred from Miami (OH). Under NCAA transfer rules, Adaway will have to sit out for the 2019–20 season. Will have two years of remaining eligibility.

=== 2019 recruiting class ===
College recruiting information
Name	Hometown	School	Height	Weight	Commit date
Justin Winston; PF	Putnam, CT	Putnam Science Academy	6 ft 6 in (1.98 m)	N/A	Sep 17, 2018
Justin Winston; PF	Recruit ratings: Scout: Rivals: (77)				
Alejandro Vasquez; PG	Flushing, NY	The Patrick School	6 ft 3 in (1.91 m)	165 lb (75 kg)	May 31, 2019
Alejandro Vasquez; PG	Recruit ratings: Scout: Rivals: (0)				
Robert Carpenter; SF	Detroit, MI	Mt. Zion Prep	6 ft 6 in (1.98 m)	195 lb (88 kg)	
Robert Carpenter; SF	Recruit ratings: Scout: Rivals: (0)				
Overall recruit ranking:
Note: In many cases, Scout, Rivals, 247Sports, On3, and ESPN may conflict in their listings of height and weight.; In these cases, the average was taken. ESPN grades are on a 100-point scale.; Sources: "2019 Team Ranking". Rivals.

== Roster ==
2019–20 St. Bonaventure Bonnies men's basketball team
Players
Coaches

Pos.	#	Name	Height	Weight	Year	Previous school	Hometown
G	0	Kyle Lofton	6 ft 3 in (1.91 m)	190 lb (86 kg)	So	Putnam Science Academy	Hillside, New Jersey
G	1	Dominick Welch	6 ft 5 in (1.96 m)	198 lb (90 kg)	So	SPIRE Institute	Buffalo, New York
F	2	Robert Carpenter	6 ft 8 in (2.03 m)	215 lb (98 kg)	Fr	Mt. Zion Prep	Detroit, Michigan
G	3	Alpha Okoli	6 ft 5 in (1.96 m)	200 lb (91 kg)	So	St. John Bosco High School	Los Angeles, California
G	4	Matt Johnson	6 ft 4 in (1.93 m)	180 lb (82 kg)	Jr	Howard College	Baltimore, Maryland
G	5	Jaren Holmes	6 ft 4 in (1.93 m)	205 lb (93 kg)	So	Ranger College	Romulus, Michigan
F	10	Bobby Planutis	6 ft 8 in (2.03 m)	200 lb (91 kg)	RS So	Mount St. Mary's	Hazleton, Pennsylvania
G	11	Alejandro Vasquez	6 ft 3 in (1.91 m)	200 lb (91 kg)	Fr	The Patrick School	Queens, New York
F/C	21	Osun Osunniyi	6 ft 10 in (2.08 m)	215 lb (98 kg)	So	Putnam Science Academy	Pleasantville, New Jersey
G	23	Malik Lacewell	6 ft 2 in (1.88 m)	160 lb (73 kg)	Fr	Christ the King Regional	Brooklyn, New York
C	32	Amadi Ikpeze	6 ft 10 in (2.08 m)	240 lb (109 kg)	Sr	Amherst Central High School	Buffalo, New York
G	33	Jalen Adaway (redshirt)	6 ft 5 in (1.96 m)	200 lb (91 kg)	Jr	Miami (OH)	Logansport, Indiana
F	35	Justin Winston	6 ft 8 in (2.03 m)	215 lb (98 kg)	Fr	The Patrick School	West Orange, New Jersey

Head coach

- Mark Schmidt (Boston College)

Assistant coach(es)

- Steve Curran (Merrimack)
- Dwayne Lee (Saint Joseph's)
- Sean Neal (La Salle)

Legend

- (C) Team captain
- (S) Suspended
- (I) Ineligible
- (W) Walk-on
- Injured
- Current redshirt

Roster

== Schedule and results ==
Date time, TV	Rank^{#}	Opponent^{#}	Result	Record	Site (attendance) city, state
Exhibition
October 30, 2019*; 7:30 pm, ESPN+		Alfred	W 90–45		Reilly Center (3,027); Olean, NY
Non-conference regular season
November 5, 2019*; 7:30 pm, ESPN+		Ohio	L 53–65	0–1	Reilly Center (4,305); Olean, NY
November 8, 2019*; 7:00 pm, ESPN+		Vermont	L 59–61	0–2	Reilly Center (4,489); Olean, NY
November 12, 2019*; 7:00 pm, ESPN+		at Siena; Brother Ed Coughlin Franciscan Cup	L 65–78	0–3	Times Union Center (5,680); Albany, NY
November 16, 2019*; 7:30 pm pm, ESPN+/TSN		vs. Rutgers; James Naismith Classic	W 80–74	1–3	Scotiabank Arena (6,802); Toronto, ON
November 23, 2019*; 2:30 pm		vs. Canisius	L 57–61	1–4	KeyBank Center (3,821); Buffalo, NY
November 26, 2019*; 7:00 am, ESPN+		Mercer; Boca Beach Classic campus game	W 56–51	2–4	Reilly Center (3,218); Olean, NY
December 1, 2019*; 9:00 pm		vs. San Diego; Boca Beach Classic Hall of Fame Bracket semifinals	W 70–61	3–4	FAU Arena; Boca Raton, FL
December 2, 2019*; 8:00 pm		at Florida Atlantic; Boca Beach Classic Hall of Fame Bracket championship	W 71–64	4–4	FAU Arena (1,122); Boca Raton, FL
December 7, 2019*; 2:30 pm, ESPN+		Hofstra; A10–CAA Challenge	W 73–45	5–4	Reilly Center (5,480); Olean, NY
December 14, 2019*; 4:00 pm, ESPN+		Gannon	W 75–50	6–4	Reilly Center (3,152); Olean, NY
December 18, 2019*; 7:00 pm, ESPN+		Niagara	W 87–70	7–4	Reilly Center (2,016); Olean, NY
December 21, 2019*; 2:00 pm		at Middle Tennessee	W 66–65	8–4	Murphy Center (2,982); Murfreesboro, TN
December 30, 2019*; 7:00 pm, ESPN+		at Buffalo	L 79–84	8–5	Alumni Arena (6,003); Buffalo, NY
Atlantic 10 regular season
January 5, 2020; 4:00 pm, ESPN+		at George Washington	W 71–66	9–5 (1–0)	Charles E. Smith Center (2,259); Washington, D.C.
January 8, 2020; 7:00 pm, Stadium		at George Mason	W 61–49	10–5 (2–0)	EagleBank Arena (2,511); Fairfax, VA
January 11, 2020; 2:00 pm, ESPN+		Fordham	W 64–44	11–5 (3–0)	Reilly Center (3,848); Olean, NY
January 15, 2020; 7:00 pm, ESPN+		vs. Massachusetts; Roc City Hoops Classic	W 74–61	12–5 (4–0)	Blue Cross Arena (4,276); Rochester, NY
January 18, 2020; 2:00 pm, CBSSN		at VCU	L 63–91	12–6 (4–1)	Siegel Center (7,637); Richmond, VA
January 22, 2020; 7:00 pm, CBSSN		at No. 7 Dayton	L 60–86	12–7 (4–2)	UD Arena (13,407); Dayton, OH
January 25, 2020; 3:00 pm, Stadium		Rhode Island	L 75–81	12–8 (4–3)	Reilly Center (5,480); Olean, NY
January 29, 2020; 7:00 pm, ESPN+		at Fordham	W 62–55 ^{OT}	13–8 (5–3)	Rose Hill Gymnasium (2,101); Bronx, NY
February 1, 2020; 4:00 pm, Stadium		George Mason	W 74–65	14–8 (6–3)	Reilly Center (5,440); Olean, NY
February 5, 2020; 7:00 pm, Stadium		George Washington	W 72–47	15–8 (7–3)	Reilly Center (4,354); Olean, NY
February 8, 2020; 3:00 pm, NBCSN		at Duquesne	W 83–80	16–8 (8–3)	UPMC Events Center (3,058); Moon Township, PA
February 11, 2020; 7:00 pm, ESPN+		at Saint Joseph's	W 74–56	17–8 (9–3)	Hagan Arena (1,595); Philadelphia, PA
February 14, 2020; 7:00 pm, ESPN2		Davidson	L 64–93	17–9 (9–4)	Reilly Center (5,237); Olean, NY
February 22, 2020; 6:30 pm, NBCSN		Richmond	W 75–71	18–9 (10–4)	Reilly Center (5,480); Olean, NY
February 26, 2020; 7:00 pm, Stadium		Duquesne	L 77–81 ^{OT}	18–10 (10–5)	Reilly Center (4,548); Olean, NY
February 29, 2020; 2:00 pm, ESPN+		at La Salle	L 65–73	18–11 (10–6)	Tom Gola Arena (2,374); Philadelphia, PA
March 4, 2020; 7:00 pm, ESPN+		Saint Joseph's	W 89–73	19–11 (11–6)	Reilly Center; Olean, NY
March 7, 2020; 8:00 pm, Stadium		at Saint Louis	L 49–72	19–12 (11–7)	Chaifetz Arena (9,274); St. Louis, MO
Atlantic 10 tournament
March 12, 2020; 2:30 pm, NBCSN	(5)	vs. (12) George Mason; Second round	A10 Tournament Canceled		Barclays Center; Brooklyn, NY
*Non-conference game. ^{#}Rankings from AP Poll/Coaches' Poll. (#) Tournament seedings in parentheses. All times are in Eastern Time.
