= 2019–20 Davidson Wildcats men's basketball team =

American college basketball season

2019–20 Davidson Wildcats men's basketball
- Conference: Atlantic 10 Conference
- Record: 16–14 (10–8 A-10)
- Head coach: Bob McKillop (31st season)
- Assistant coaches: Matt McKillop; Will Reigel; Kevin Kuwik
- Home arena: John M. Belk Arena

2019–20 Atlantic 10 men's basketball standings
	Conf.				Overall
Team	W		L	PCT	W		L	PCT
No. 3 Dayton	18	–	0	1.000	29	–	2	.935
Richmond	14	–	4	.778	24	–	7	.774
Rhode Island	13	–	5	.722	21	–	9	.700
Saint Louis	12	–	6	.667	23	–	8	.742
St. Bonaventure	11	–	7	.611	19	–	12	.613
Duquesne	11	–	7	.611	21	–	9	.700
Davidson	10	–	8	.556	16	–	14	.533
Massachusetts	8	–	10	.444	14	–	17	.452
VCU	8	–	10	.444	18	–	13	.581
La Salle	6	–	12	.333	15	–	15	.500
George Washington	6	–	12	.333	12	–	20	.375
George Mason	5	–	13	.278	17	–	15	.531
Saint Joseph's	2	–	16	.111	6	–	26	.188
Fordham	2	–	16	.111	9	–	22	.290
Note: The 2020 A-10 tournament was canceled after the first round due to the COVID-19 pandemic. Rankings from AP poll

The 2019–20 Davidson Wildcats men's basketball team represented Davidson College during the 2019–20 NCAA Division I men's basketball season. The Wildcats were led by 31st-year head coach Bob McKillop and played their home games at the John M. Belk Arena in Davidson, North Carolina as members of the Atlantic 10 Conference. They finished the season 16–14, 10–8 in A-10 play to finish in seventh place. Their season ended when the A-10 tournament and all other postseason tournaments were canceled due to the ongoing coronavirus pandemic.

== Previous season ==
The Wildcats finished the 2018–19 season 24–10, 14–4 to finish as runners-up in the Atlantic 10 regular season. They defeated Saint Joseph's in the quarterfinals of the A-10 tournament before losing to Saint Louis in the semifinals. They received an at-large bid to the National Invitation Tournament as a No. 4 seed, where they lost to Lipscomb in the first round.

== Offseason ==
=== Departures ===
Name	Number	Pos.	Height	Weight	Year	Hometown	Reason for departure
Nathan Ekwu	1	F	6'7"	245	RS Senior	Enugu, Nigeria	Graduated
Dusan Kovacevic	43	F	6'10"	245	RS Junior	Novi Sad, Serbia	Graduate transferred

=== 2019 recruiting class ===
College recruiting information
Name	Hometown	School	Height	Weight	Commit date
David Kristensen; PF	Aarhus, Denmark	Marselisborg Secondary School	6 ft 10 in (2.08 m)	210 lb (95 kg)	
David Kristensen; PF	Recruit ratings: Scout: Rivals: 247Sports: (NR)				
Lee Hyun-jung; SF	South Korea	NBA Global Academy	6 ft 7 in (2.01 m)	180 lb (82 kg)	May 14, 2019
Lee Hyun-jung; SF	Recruit ratings: Scout: Rivals: 247Sports: (NR)				
Overall recruit ranking:
Note: In many cases, Scout, Rivals, 247Sports, On3, and ESPN may conflict in their listings of height and weight.; In these cases, the average was taken. ESPN grades are on a 100-point scale.; Sources: "2019 Team Ranking". Rivals.

=== 2020 recruiting class ===
College recruiting information (2020)
Name	Hometown	School	Height	Weight	Commit date
Grant Huffman; SG	Lakewood, OH	Saint Edward High School	6 ft 2 in (1.88 m)	N/A	Jul 14, 2019
Grant Huffman; SG	Recruit ratings: Scout: Rivals: 247Sports: (NR)				
Emory Lanier; PG	Knoxville, TN	Webb School Of Knoxville	6 ft 3 in (1.91 m)	185 lb (84 kg)	Jul 16, 2019
Emory Lanier; PG	Recruit ratings: Scout: Rivals: 247Sports: (NR)				
Samuel Mennenga; PF	New Zealand	NBA Global Academy	6 ft 8 in (2.03 m)	215 lb (98 kg)	Oct 21, 2019
Samuel Mennenga; PF	Recruit ratings: Scout: Rivals: 247Sports: (NR)				
Overall recruit ranking:
Note: In many cases, Scout, Rivals, 247Sports, On3, and ESPN may conflict in their listings of height and weight.; In these cases, the average was taken. ESPN grades are on a 100-point scale.; Sources: "2020 Team Ranking". Rivals.

== Roster ==
2019–20 Davidson Wildcats men's basketball team
Players
Coaches

Pos.	#	Name	Height	Weight	Year	Previous school	Hometown
F	1	Lee Hyun-jung	6 ft 7 in (2.01 m)	195 lb (88 kg)	Fr	NBA Global Academy	Yongin, South Korea
G	3	Jón Axel Guðmundsson	6 ft 4 in (1.93 m)	200 lb (91 kg)	Sr	Fjölbrautaskóli Suðurnesja	Grindavík, Iceland
G	4	Cal Freundlich (W)	6 ft 2 in (1.88 m)	160 lb (73 kg)	Sr	Friends Seminary	New York, New York
G	5	Malcolm Wynter (W)	5 ft 10 in (1.78 m)	155 lb (70 kg)	Sr	Harborfields High School	Greenlawn, New York
F	12	David Kristensen	6 ft 10 in (2.08 m)	210 lb (95 kg)	Fr	Marelisborg Gymnasium	Aarhus, Denmark
G	13	Mike Jones	6 ft 4 in (1.93 m)	210 lb (95 kg)	RS Fr	Woodbury High School	Woodbury, Minnesota
G	14	Luke Frampton	6 ft 5 in (1.96 m)	200 lb (91 kg)	RS So	Poca High School	Poca, West Virginia
F	15	Patrick Casey (W)	6 ft 6 in (1.98 m)	210 lb (95 kg)	Sr	Fort Mill High School	Fort Mill, South Carolina
G	20	KiShawn Pritchett	6 ft 6 in (1.98 m)	225 lb (102 kg)	RS Sr	Lake Norman High School	Mooresville, North Carolina
G	22	Drew Dibble	5 ft 11 in (1.8 m)	185 lb (84 kg)	RS So	University School of Nashville	Nashville, Tennessee
G	24	Carter Collins	6 ft 3 in (1.91 m)	190 lb (86 kg)	Jr	East Chapel Hill High School	Chapel Hill, North Carolina
F	25	Bates Jones (W)	6 ft 8 in (2.03 m)	225 lb (102 kg)	Jr	Charlotte Latin School	Charlotte, North Carolina
G	31	Kellan Grady	6 ft 5 in (1.96 m)	205 lb (93 kg)	Jr	Northfield Mount Hermon School	Boston, Massachusetts
F	32	Nelson Boachie-Yiadom	6 ft 8 in (2.03 m)	220 lb (100 kg)	So	Loomis Chaffee School	London, England
F	35	Luka Brajkovic	6 ft 10 in (2.08 m)	250 lb (113 kg)	So	Gymnasium Schillerstraße	Feldkirch, Austria
G	53	David Czerapowicz	6 ft 3 in (1.91 m)	185 lb (84 kg)	So	Marks Gymnasieskola	Gothenburg, Sweden

Head coach

- Bob McKillop (Hofstra)

Assistant coach(es)

- Matt McKillop (Davidson)
- Will Reigel (Davidson)
- Kevin Kuwik (Notre Dame)

Legend

- (C) Team captain
- (S) Suspended
- (I) Ineligible
- (W) Walk-on
- Injured
- Current redshirt

Roster

== Schedule and results ==
Date time, TV	Rank^{#}	Opponent^{#}	Result	Record	Site (attendance) city, state
Exhibition
November 4, 2019*; 7:00 pm		Glenville State	W 102–94		John M. Belk Arena (2,551); Davidson, NC
Non-conference regular season
November 8, 2019*; 6:00 pm, CBSSN		vs. No. 24 Auburn; Veterans Classic	L 66–76	0–1	Alumni Hall (4,549); Annapolis, MD
November 12, 2019*; 7:00 pm		at Charlotte	L 58–71	0–2	Dale F. Halton Arena (4,341); Charlotte, NC
November 16, 2019*; 7:00 pm, ESPN+		UNC Wilmington; A10–CAA Challenge	W 87–49	1–2	John M. Belk Arena (3,764); Davidson, NC
November 19, 2019*; 7:00 pm, ESPN+		Nevada	W 91–71	2–2	John M. Belk Arena (3,106); Davidson, NC
November 22, 2019*; 7:30 pm, ESPN+		vs. Wake Forest	L 70–82	2–3	Spectrum Center (4,200); Charlotte, NC
November 28, 2019*; 6:30 pm, ESPNU		vs. Marquette; Orlando Invitational quarterfinals	L 63–73	2–4	HP Field House (2,084); Orlando, FL
November 29, 2019*; 7:00 pm, ESPNews		vs. Fairfield; Orlando Invitational consolation 2nd round	W 67–56	3–4	HP Field House (2,457); Orlando, FL
December 1, 2019*; 4:00 pm, ESPN2		vs. Temple; Orlando Invitational 5th place game	L 53–66	3–5	HP Field House; Orlando, FL
December 7, 2019*; 4:00 pm, NESN		at Northeastern	W 70–63	4–5	Matthews Arena (1,501); Boston, MA
December 10, 2019*; 7:00 pm, ESPN+		Coppin State	W 88–52	5–5	John M. Belk Arena (3,029); Davidson, NC
December 22, 2019*; 3:00 pm, NBCSCHI		at Loyola–Chicago	W 59–56	6–5	Joseph J. Gentile Arena (3,012); Chicago, IL
December 30, 2019*; 7:00 pm, SECN+		at Vanderbilt	L 71–76	6–6	Memorial Gymnasium (9,640); Nashville, TN
A-10 regular season
January 5, 2020; 2:00 pm, NBCSN		at Duquesne	L 64–71	6–7 (0–1)	UPMC Events Center (1,897); Moon Township, PA
January 8, 2020; 7:00 pm, CBSSN		at Rhode Island	L 58–69	6–8 (0–2)	Ryan Center (5,095); Kingston, RI
January 11, 2020; 2:30 pm, NBCSN		Saint Joseph's	W 89–83 ^{OT}	7–8 (1–2)	John M. Belk Arena (4,236); Davidson, NC
January 14, 2020; 7:00 pm, ESPNU		Richmond	L 64–70	7–9 (1–3)	John M. Belk Arena (3,503); Davidson, NC
January 19, 2020; 12:00 pm, CBSSN		at Fordham	W 74–62	8–9 (2–3)	Rose Hill Gymnasium (1,936); Bronx, NY
January 22, 2020; 7:00 pm, Stadium		Saint Louis	W 71–59	9–9 (3–3)	John M. Belk Arena (3,236); Davidson, NC
January 25, 2020; 6:00 pm, CBSSN		George Mason	W 68–53	10–9 (4–3)	John M. Belk Arena (4,394); Davidson, NC
January 29, 2020; 7:00 pm, ESPN+		at George Washington	L 104–107 ^{4OT}	10–10 (4–4)	Charles E. Smith Center (2,406); Washington, D.C.
February 1, 2020; 8:00 pm, CBSSN		UMass	W 85–50	11–10 (5–4)	John M. Belk Arena (3,832); Davidson, NC
February 7, 2020; 7:00 pm, ESPN2		at VCU	L 62–73	11–11 (5–5)	Siegel Center (7,637); Richmond, VA
February 11, 2020; 7:00 pm, ESPN+		Fordham	W 79–49	12–11 (6–5)	John M. Belk Arena (3,341); Davidson, NC
February 14, 2020; 7:00 pm, ESPN2		at St. Bonaventure	W 93–64	13–11 (7–5)	Reilly Center (5,237); Olean, NY
February 18, 2020; 6:30 pm, CBSSN		at Saint Joseph's	L 72–73	13–12 (7–6)	Hagan Arena (1,820); Philadelphia, PA
February 22, 2020; 5:30 pm, CBSSN		Rhode Island	W 77–75 ^{OT}	14–12 (8–6)	John M. Belk Arena (4,597); Davidson, NC
February 25, 2020; 7:00 pm, ESPN+		La Salle	W 74–49	15–12 (9–6)	John M. Belk Arena (2,888); Davidson, NC
February 28, 2020; 7:00 pm, ESPN2		at No. 4 Dayton	L 67–82	15–13 (9–7)	UD Arena (13,407); Dayton, OH
March 3, 2020; 7:00 pm, ESPN+		at Richmond	L 63–80	15–14 (9–8)	Robins Center (6,501); Richmond, VA
March 6, 2020; 9:00 pm, ESPN2		VCU	W 75–65	16–14 (10–8)	John M. Belk Arena (3,763); Davidson, NC
A-10 tournament
Mar 12, 2020; 6:00 pm, NBCSN	(7)	vs. (10) La Salle; Second round	A10 Tournament Canceled		Barclays Center; Brooklyn, NY
*Non-conference game. ^{#}Rankings from AP Poll. (#) Tournament seedings in parentheses. All times are in Eastern Time.
