= 2019–20 Saint Joseph's Hawks men's basketball team =

American college basketball season

2019–20 Saint Joseph's Hawks men's basketball
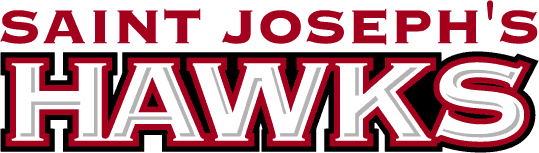
- Conference: Atlantic 10 Conference
- Record: 6–26 (2–16 A-10)
- Head coach: Billy Lange (1st season)
- Assistant coaches: John Griffin III; Justin Scott; Brenden Straughn
- Home arena: Hagan Arena

2019–20 Atlantic 10 men's basketball standings
| | Conf. | | | | Overall |
| Team | W | | L | PCT | W | | L | PCT |
|---|---|---|---|---|---|---|---|---|
| No. 3 Dayton | 18 | – | 0 | 1.000 | 29 | – | 2 | .935 |
| Richmond | 14 | – | 4 | .778 | 24 | – | 7 | .774 |
| Rhode Island | 13 | – | 5 | .722 | 21 | – | 9 | .700 |
| Saint Louis | 12 | – | 6 | .667 | 23 | – | 8 | .742 |
| St. Bonaventure | 11 | – | 7 | .611 | 19 | – | 12 | .613 |
| Duquesne | 11 | – | 7 | .611 | 21 | – | 9 | .700 |
| Davidson | 10 | – | 8 | .556 | 16 | – | 14 | .533 |
| Massachusetts | 8 | – | 10 | .444 | 14 | – | 17 | .452 |
| VCU | 8 | – | 10 | .444 | 18 | – | 13 | .581 |
| La Salle | 6 | – | 12 | .333 | 15 | – | 15 | .500 |
| George Washington | 6 | – | 12 | .333 | 12 | – | 20 | .375 |
| George Mason | 5 | – | 13 | .278 | 17 | – | 15 | .531 |
| Saint Joseph's | 2 | – | 16 | .111 | 6 | – | 26 | .188 |
| Fordham | 2 | – | 16 | .111 | 9 | – | 22 | .290 |
Note: The 2020 A-10 tournament was canceled after the first round due to the COVID-19 pandemic. Rankings from AP poll

The 2019–20 Saint Joseph's Hawks basketball team represented Saint Joseph's University during the 2019–20 NCAA Division I men's basketball season. The Hawks were led by first-year head coach Billy Lange and played their home games at Hagan Arena in Philadelphia, Pennsylvania as members of the Atlantic 10 Conference.

Saint Joseph's finished the season with a 6–26 record and finished 2–16 in Atlantic 10 play. They entered as the bottom seed in the 2020 Atlantic 10 men's basketball tournament. There, they were eliminated in the first round by George Mason, 70–77.

== Previous season ==
The Hawks finished the 2018–19 season 14–19 overall, 6–12 in A-10 play to finish in a tie for 10th place. As the No. 10 seed in the A-10 tournament, they advanced to the quarterfinals, where they lost to Davidson.

On March 19, 2019, Phil Martelli was fired after 24 seasons as the head coach. He ended his tenure at Saint Joseph's with a 444–328 record. Shortly thereafter, the school hired Philadelphia 76ers assistant coach Billy Lange as head coach.

== Offseason ==
=== Departures ===
| Name | Number | Pos. | Height | Weight | Year | Hometown | Reason for departure |
|---|---|---|---|---|---|---|---|
| Lamarr Kimble | 0 | G | 6'0" | 185 | RS Junior | Philadelphia, PA | Graduate transferred to Louisville |
| Charlie Brown Jr. | 2 | F | 6'7" | 197 | RS Sophomore | Philadelphia, PA | Declare for 2019 NBA draft |
| Jared Bynum | 3 | G | 5'10" | 172 | Freshman | Washington, D.C. | Transferred to Providence |
| Chris Clover | 15 | G | 6'3" | 217 | Senior | Philadelphia, PA | Graduated |
| Mike Muggeo | 20 | G | 6'3" | 203 | Senior | River Vale, NJ | Walk-on; graduated |
| Markell Lodge | 23 | F | 6'7" | 217 | RS Senior | Creedmoor, NC | Graduated |
| Pierfrancesco Oliva | 24 | F | 6'8" | 212 | RS Junior | Taranto, Italy | Signed to play professionally in Italy with Roseto Sharks |

=== Incoming transfers ===
| Name | Number | Pos. | Height | Weight | Year | Hometown | Previous School |
|---|---|---|---|---|---|---|---|
| Myles Douglas | 2 | F | 6'8" | 215 | RS Sophomore | Edgewood, MD | Transferred from UCF. Will be eligible to play. |
| Greg Foster Jr. | 23 | G | 6'5" | 195 | Sophomore | Milwaukee, WI | Transferred from Gonzaga. Under NCAA transfer rules, Foster Jr. will sit out the 2019–20 season and will have three years of remaining eligibility. |
| Dennis Ashley | 25 | G | 6'1" | 176 | RS Senior | Los Angeles, CA | Transferred from Maine. Will be eligible to play immediately since Ashley graduated from Maine. |

=== 2019 recruiting class ===
College recruiting information
| Name | Hometown | School | Height | Weight | Commit date |
|---|---|---|---|---|---|
| Cameron Brown; SG | Greenbelt, MD | Eleanor Roosevelt High School | 6 ft 6 in (1.98 m) | 190 lb (86 kg) | |
| Cameron Brown; SG | Recruit ratings: Scout: Rivals: 247Sports: ESPN: (NR) | | | | |
| Rahmir Moore; SG | Philadelphia, PA | Rise Prep (ON) | 6 ft 4 in (1.93 m) | N/A | |
| Rahmir Moore; SG | Recruit ratings: Scout: Rivals: 247Sports: ESPN: (NR) | | | | |
| Chereef Knox; SG | Philadelphia, PA | Imhotep Charter School | 6 ft 6 in (1.98 m) | 185 lb (84 kg) | |
| Chereef Knox; SG | Recruit ratings: Scout: Rivals: 247Sports: ESPN: (NR) | | | | |
Overall recruit ranking:
Note: In many cases, Scout, Rivals, 247Sports, On3, and ESPN may conflict in their listings of height and weight.; In these cases, the average was taken. ESPN grades are on a 100-point scale.; Sources: "Saint Joseph's Hawks". ESPN.; "2019 Team Ranking". Rivals.

=== 2020 recruiting class ===
College recruiting information (2020)
| Name | Hometown | School | Height | Weight | Commit date |
|---|---|---|---|---|---|
| Jordan Hall; SF | Philadelphia, PA | Neumann-Goretti High School | 6 ft 7 in (2.01 m) | N/A | Jun 25, 2019 |
| Jordan Hall; SF | Recruit ratings: Scout: Rivals: 247Sports: ESPN: (NR) | | | | |
| Anton Jansson; C | Napa, CA | Golden State Prep | 6 ft 10 in (2.08 m) | 230 lb (100 kg) | Nov 15, 2019 |
| Anton Jansson; C | Recruit ratings: Scout: Rivals: 247Sports: ESPN: (NR) | | | | |
Overall recruit ranking:
Note: In many cases, Scout, Rivals, 247Sports, On3, and ESPN may conflict in their listings of height and weight.; In these cases, the average was taken. ESPN grades are on a 100-point scale.; Sources: "Saint Joseph's Hawks". ESPN.; "2019 Team Ranking". Rivals.

== Roster ==
2019–20 Saint Joseph's Hawks men's basketball team
Players
Coaches

| Pos. | # | Name | Height | Weight | Year | Previous school | Hometown |
|---|---|---|---|---|---|---|---|
| F | 0 | Chereef Knox | 6 ft 5 in (1.96 m) | 210 lb (95 kg) | Fr | Imhotep Charter | Philadelphia, PA |
| G | 1 | Ryan Daly | 6 ft 4 in (1.93 m) | 225 lb (102 kg) | RS Jr | Archbishop John Carroll; Delaware | Ardmore, PA |
| F | 2 | Myles Douglas | 6 ft 7 in (2.01 m) | 215 lb (98 kg) | RS So | Aberdeen; UCF | Edgewood, MD |
| G | 3 | Cameron Brown | 6 ft 5 in (1.96 m) | 210 lb (95 kg) | Fr | Eleanor Roosevelt | Greenbelt, MD |
| G | 5 | Greg Smith (W) | 6 ft 0 in (1.83 m) | 183 lb (83 kg) | Sr | Rutgers Prep | Flemington, NJ |
| G | 10 | Rahmir Moore | 6 ft 3 in (1.91 m) | 205 lb (93 kg) | Fr | RISE Prep (Ontario) | Philadelphia, PA |
| G | 11 | Toliver Freeman | 6 ft 3 in (1.91 m) | 215 lb (98 kg) | Sr | Catholic | Baton Rouge, LA |
| F | 12 | Anthony Longpré | 6 ft 10 in (2.08 m) | 245 lb (111 kg) | Jr | Glenelg Country (MD) | L'Assomption, QE |
| F | 21 | Lorenzo Edwards | 6 ft 8 in (2.03 m) | 215 lb (98 kg) | RS Jr | Lake Forest | Lake Forest, IL |
| G | 23 | Greg Foster Jr. (redshirt) | 6 ft 5 in (1.96 m) | 195 lb (88 kg) | So | Ed W. Clark; Gonzaga | Milwaukee, WI |
| G | 32 | Dennis Ashley | 6 ft 1 in (1.85 m) | 176 lb (80 kg) | RS Sr | St. Monica Academy; Maine | Los Angeles, CA |
| F | 33 | Taylor Funk | 6 ft 8 in (2.03 m) | 230 lb (104 kg) | Jr | Manheim Central | Lancaster, PA |

Head coach

- Billy Lange (Rowan)

Assistant coach(es)

- John Griffin III (Bucknell)
- Justin Scott (East Stroudsburg)
- Brenden Straughn (Hood)

Legend

- (C) Team captain
- (S) Suspended
- (I) Ineligible
- (W) Walk-on
- Injured
- Current redshirt

Roster

== Schedule and results ==
| Date time, TV | Rank^{#} | Opponent^{#} | Result | Record | Site (attendance) city, state |
Regular season
| November 5, 2019*; 7:00 pm, NBCSPHI+ | | Bradley | W 86–81 | 1–0 | Hagan Arena (2,068); Philadelphia, PA |
| November 10, 2020*; 2:00 pm, CUSA.tv | | at Old Dominion | L 69–82 | 1–1 | Chartway Arena (6,086); Norfolk, VA |
| November 13, 2019*; 7:00 pm, CBSSN | | at UConn; Charleston Classic non bracket game | W 96–87 | 2–1 | Harry A. Gampel Pavilion (4,081); Storrs, CT |
| November 16, 2019*; 2:00 pm, NBCSCHI | | at Loyola–Chicago | L 68–85 | 2–2 | Joseph J. Gentile Arena (2,921); Chicago, IL |
| November 21, 2019*; 1:30 pm, ESPN2 | | vs. Florida; Charleston Classic quarterfinals | L 62–70 | 2–3 | TD Arena (2,914); Charleston, SC |
| November 22, 2019*; 2:30 pm, ESPNU | | vs. Missouri State; Charleston Classic consolation 2nd round | L 69–71 | 2–4 | TD Arena (3,245); Charleston, SC |
| November 24, 2019*; 6:00 pm, ESPNU | | vs. Towson; Charleston Classic 7th place game | L 64–76 | 2–5 | TD Arena; Charleston, SC |
| November 30, 2019*; 7:00 pm, ESPN+ | | Saint Francis (PA) | L 63–79 | 2–6 | Hagan Arena (2,124); Philadelphia, PA |
| December 3, 2019*; 7:00 pm, ESPN+ | | Lafayette | L 71–94 | 2–7 | Hagan Arena (2,011); Philadelphia, PA |
| December 7, 2019*; 3:00 pm, ESPN2 | | No. 23 Villanova; Philadelphia Big 5/Holy War | L 66–78 | 2–8 | Hagan Arena (3,456); Philadelphia, PA |
| December 10, 2019*; 7:00 pm, ESPNU | | at Temple; Philadelphia Big 5/rivalry | L 61–108 | 2–9 | Liacouras Center (6,197); Philadelphia, PA |
| December 19, 2019*; 7:00 pm, ESPN+ | | William & Mary | W 84–69 | 3–9 | Hagan Arena (1,513); Philadelphia, PA |
| January 2, 2020; 7:00 pm, ESPN+ | | at Richmond | L 52–84 | 3–10 (0–1) | Robins Center (5,016); Richmond, VA |
| January 5, 2020; 1:00 pm, ESPN+ | | No. 20 Dayton | L 67–80 | 3–11 (0–2) | Hagan Arena (2,544); Philadelphia, PA |
| January 8, 2020; 7:00 pm, ESPN+ | | Duquesne | L 60–78 | 3–12 (0–3) | Hagan Arena (1,885); Philadelphia, PA |
| January 11, 2020; 2:30 pm, NBCSN | | at Davidson | L 83–89 | 3–13 (0–4) | John M. Belk Arena (4,236); Davidson, NC |
| January 15, 2020; 7:30 pm, ESPN+ | | Rhode Island | L 61–71 | 3–14 (0–5) | Hagan Arena (1,964); Philadelphia, PA |
| January 18, 2020*; 2:00 pm, NBCSPHI | | at Penn; Big 5 | W 87–81 | 4–14 | Palestra (6,266); Philadelphia, PA |
| January 21, 2020; 9:00 pm, CBSSN | | VCU | L 60–73 | 4–15 (0–6) | Hagan Arena (1,725); Philadelphia, PA |
| January 25, 2020; 4:00 pm, ESPN+ | | at George Washington | L 69–85 | 4–16 (0–7) | Charles E. Smith Center (2,667); Washington, D.C. |
| January 29, 2020; 7:00 pm, ESPN+ | | at Massachusetts | L 76–91 | 4–17 (0–8) | Mullins Center (2,024); Amherst, MA |
| February 1, 2020; 6:30 pm, NBCSN | | Saint Louis | L 73–78 | 4–18 (0–9) | Hagan Arena (2,161); Philadelphia, PA |
| February 8, 2020; 5:00 pm, ESPN+ | | at La Salle; Big 5 | L 66–83 | 4–19 (0–10) | Tom Gola Arena (2,118); Philadelphia, PA |
| February 11, 2020; 7:00 pm, ESPN+ | | St. Bonaventure | L 56-74 | 4–20 (0–11) | Hagan Arena (1,595); Philadelphia, PA |
| February 15, 2020; 12:00 pm, CBSSN | | at Rhode Island | L 55–73 | 4–21 (0–12) | Ryan Center (6,673); Kingston, RI |
| February 18, 2020; 6:30 pm, CBSSN | | Davidson | W 73–72 | 5–21 (1–12) | Hagan Arena (1,820); Philadelphia, PA |
| February 22, 2020; 4:30 pm, NBCSN | | at George Mason | L 55–62 | 5–22 (1–13) | EagleBank Arena (5,649); Fairfax, VA |
| February 26, 2020; 9:00 pm, CBSSN | | at Saint Louis | L 63–76 | 5–23 (1–14) | Chaifetz Arena (5,096); St. Louis, MO |
| February 29, 2020; 1:00 pm, ESPN+ | | Fordham | W 73–69 | 6–23 (2–14) | Hagan Arena (2,257); Philadelphia, PA |
| March 4, 2020; 7:00 pm, ESPN+ | | at St. Bonaventure | L 73–89 | 6–24 (2–15) | Reilly Center; Olean, NY |
| March 7, 2020; 2:00 pm, NBCSPHI | | La Salle | L 77-78 | 6–25 (2–16) | Hagan Arena (2,390); Philadelphia, PA |
Atlantic 10 tournament
| March 11, 2020; 1:00 pm, ESPN+ | (13) | vs. (12) George Mason; First round | L 70–77 | 6–26 | Barclays Center (2,461); Brooklyn, NY |
*Non-conference game. ^{#}Rankings from AP Poll. (#) Tournament seedings in parentheses. All times are in Eastern Time.
