= 2020 Atlantic 10 men's basketball tournament =

Basketball tournament

- Classification: Division I
- Season: 2019–20
- Teams: 14
- Site: Barclays Center; Brooklyn, New York
- Attendance: 2,461
- Television: ESPN+, NBCSN, CBSSN, CBS

2019–20 Atlantic 10 men's basketball standings
	Conf.				Overall
Team	W		L	PCT	W		L	PCT
No. 3 Dayton	18	–	0	1.000	29	–	2	.935
Richmond	14	–	4	.778	24	–	7	.774
Rhode Island	13	–	5	.722	21	–	9	.700
Saint Louis	12	–	6	.667	23	–	8	.742
St. Bonaventure	11	–	7	.611	19	–	12	.613
Duquesne	11	–	7	.611	21	–	9	.700
Davidson	10	–	8	.556	16	–	14	.533
Massachusetts	8	–	10	.444	14	–	17	.452
VCU	8	–	10	.444	18	–	13	.581
La Salle	6	–	12	.333	15	–	15	.500
George Washington	6	–	12	.333	12	–	20	.375
George Mason	5	–	13	.278	17	–	15	.531
Saint Joseph's	2	–	16	.111	6	–	26	.188
Fordham	2	–	16	.111	9	–	22	.290
Note: The 2020 A-10 tournament was canceled after the first round due to the COVID-19 pandemic. Rankings from AP poll

The 2020 Atlantic 10 men's basketball tournament was the postseason men's basketball tournament for the Atlantic 10 Conference's 2019–20 season. It was scheduled to be held from March 11, through March 15, 2020, at the Barclays Center in Brooklyn, New York.

On March 12, 2020, the remainder of the Atlantic 10 Tournament was cancelled due to the COVID-19 pandemic.

== Seeds ==
All 14 A-10 schools were slated to participate in the tournament. Teams were seeded by record within the conference, with a tiebreaker system to seed teams with identical conference records. The top 10 teams received a first-round bye and the top four teams received a double bye, automatically advancing them to the quarterfinals.

Seed	School	Record	Tiebreaker
1	Dayton	18–0	
2	Richmond	14–4	
3	Rhode Island	13–5	
4	Saint Louis	12–6	
5	St. Bonaventure	11–7	1–1 vs. Duquesne, 1–0 vs. Richmond
6	Duquesne	11–7	1–1 vs. St. Bonaventure, 0–1 vs. Richmond
7	Davidson	10–8	
8	Massachusetts	8–10	1–0 vs. VCU
9	VCU	8–10	0–1 vs. UMass
10	La Salle	6–12	1–0 vs. George Washington
11	George Washington	6–12	0–1 vs. La Salle
12	George Mason	5–13	
13	Saint Joseph's	2–16	1–0 vs. Fordham
14	Fordham	2–16	0–1 vs. Saint Joseph's

== Schedule ==
Session	Game	Time	Matchup	Score	Television	Attendance
First round – Wednesday, March 11
1	1	1:00 pm	No. 12 George Mason vs No. 13 Saint Joseph's	77–70	ESPN+	2,461
1	2	3:30 pm	No. 11 George Washington vs No. 14 Fordham	52–72	ESPN+	2,461
Second round – Thursday, March 12
2	3	12:00 pm	No. 8 Massachusetts vs No. 9 VCU	cancelled	NBCSN	N/A
2	4	2:30 pm	No. 5 St. Bonaventure vs No. 12 George Mason	cancelled	NBCSN	N/A
3	5	6:00 pm	No. 7 Davidson vs No. 10 La Salle	cancelled	NBCSN	N/A
3	6	8:30 pm	No. 6 Duquesne vs No. 14 Fordham	cancelled	NBCSN	N/A
Quarterfinals – Friday, March 13
4	7	12:00 pm	No. 1 Dayton vs Winner of game 3	cancelled	NBCSN	N/A
4	8	2:30 pm	No. 4 Saint Louis vs Winner of game 4	cancelled	NBCSN	N/A
5	9	6:00 pm	No. 2 Richmond vs Winner of game 5	cancelled	NBCSN	N/A
5	10	8:30 pm	No. 3 Rhode Island vs Winner of game 6	cancelled	NBCSN	N/A
Semifinals – Saturday, March 14
6	11	1:00 pm	Winner of game 7 vs Winner of game 8	cancelled	CBSSN	N/A
6	12	3:30 pm	Winner of game 9 vs Winner of game 10	cancelled	CBSSN	N/A
Championship – Sunday, March 15
7	13	1:00 pm	Winner of game 11 vs Winner of game 12	cancelled	CBS	N/A

*Game times in Eastern Time.

== Bracket ==
First round Wednesday, March 11; ESPN+
12	George Mason	77
13	Saint Joseph's	70
11	George Washington	52
14	Fordham	72

Second round Thursday, March 12; NBCSN
8	UMass
9	VCU
5	St. Bonaventure
12	George Mason
7	Davidson
10	La Salle
6	Duquesne
14	Fordham

Quarterfinals; Friday, March 13; NBCSN
1	#3 Dayton
4	Saint Louis
2	Richmond
3	Rhode Island

Semifinals; Saturday, March 14; CBSSN

Championship; Sunday, March 15; CBS

* denotes overtime period

== Game summaries ==
=== First round ===
ESPN+

March 11
1:00 PM

Report

#12 George Mason 77, #13 Saint Joseph's 70
Scoring by half: 38-27, 39-43
Pts: Wilson (24); Rebs: Tied (9); Asts: Johnson (4)	Pts: Daly (28); Rebs: Freeman (7); Asts: Tied (3)

Barclays Center
Brooklyn, NY
Attendance: 2,461
Referees: Justin Porterfield, Les Jones, Wally Rutecki

ESPN+

March 11
3:00 PM

Report

#11 George Washington 52, #14 Fordham 72
Scoring by half: 17-32, 35-40
Pts: Potter (24); Rebs: Paar (8); Asts: Walker Jr (4)	Pts: Cobb (15); Rebs: Soriano (12); Asts: Tied (3)

Barclays Center
Brooklyn, NY
Attendance: 2,461
Referees: Jeff Pon, Tommy Morrissey, Sean Hull
