= T. J. Buchanan =

American basketball player and coach (born 1993)

Kalamazoo Galaxy
- Title: Head coach
- League: TBL

Personal information
- Born: June 3, 1993 (age 33) Kalamazoo, Michigan
- Listed height: 6 ft 3 in (1.91 m)
- Listed weight: 195 lb (88 kg)

Career information
- High school: Kalamazoo Central High School (Kalamazoo, Michigan)
- College: Rhode Island (2011–2015)
- NBA draft: 2015: undrafted
- Position: Point guard

Career history

Coaching
- 2015-2017: Kalamazoo Central High School (assistant)
- 2017–2018: Rhode Island (dir. player development)
- 2018–2019: Rhode Island (dir. ops.)
- 2019–2022: Rhode Island (assistant)
- 2022–present: Kalamazoo Galaxy

Terry Buchanan (born June 2, 1993) is an American professional basketball coach for the Kalamazoo Galaxy of TBL. He played four seasons of college basketball for the Rhode Island Rams.

== College ==
Buchanan announced on September 21, 2010, would compete for the Rhode Island Rams.

== Coaching career ==
After graduating from Rhode Island, Buchanan spent three seasons as an assistant coach for Kalamazoo Central, helping the team win back-to-back Class A Southwest Michigan District championships from 2015-2016 seasons. In 2017, Buchanan rejoined the Rhode Island Rams as a member of its coaching staff and in 2019 was named as an assistant coach.

On November 16, 2022, the Kalamazoo Galaxy of The Basketball League announced Buchanan as the team's first head coach.
