= 2019–20 Missouri State Bears basketball team =

American college basketball season

2019–20 Missouri State Bears basketball
- Conference: Missouri Valley Conference
- Record: 16–17 (9–9 MVC)
- Head coach: Dana Ford (2nd season)
- Assistant coaches: Corey Gipson; Jake Headrick; Jase Herl
- Home arena: JQH Arena

2019–20 Missouri Valley Conference men's basketball standings
	Conf.				Overall
Team	W		L	PCT	W		L	PCT
Northern Iowa	14	–	4	.778	25	–	6	.806
Loyola Chicago	13	–	5	.722	21	–	11	.656
Indiana State	11	–	7	.611	18	–	12	.600
Bradley †	11	–	7	.611	23	–	11	.676
Southern Illinois	10	–	8	.556	16	–	16	.500
Missouri State	9	–	9	.500	16	–	17	.485
Valparaiso	9	–	9	.500	19	–	16	.543
Drake	8	–	10	.444	20	–	14	.588
Illinois State	5	–	13	.278	10	–	21	.323
Evansville	0	–	18	.000	9	–	23	.281
† 2020 MVC tournament winner

The 2019–20 Missouri State Bears basketball team represented Missouri State University during the 2019–20 NCAA Division I men's basketball season. The Bears, led by second-year head coach Dana Ford, played their home games at JQH Arena in Springfield, Missouri as members of the Missouri Valley Conference. They finished the season 16–17, 9–9 in MVC play to finish in a tie for sixth place. They defeated Indiana State in the quarterfinals of the MVC tournament before losing in the semifinals to Valpariso.

== Previous season ==
The Bears finished the 2018–19 season 16–16, 10–8 in MVC play to finish in a tie for third place. As the No. 4 seed in the MVC tournament, they lost in the quarterfinals to Bradley.

== Offseason ==
=== 2019 recruiting class ===
College recruiting information
Name	Hometown	School	Height	Weight	Commit date
Jordan Brinson #31 PG	Los Angeles, CA	Westchester High School	6 ft 10 in (2.08 m)	210 lb (95 kg)	Oct 5, 2018
Jordan Brinson #31 PG	Recruit ratings: Scout: Rivals: 247Sports: (80)				
Tyem Freeman #44 SF	Springfield, MO	Hillcrest High School	6 ft 5 in (1.96 m)	180 lb (82 kg)	Aug 11, 2018
Tyem Freeman #44 SF	Recruit ratings: Scout: Rivals: 247Sports: (78)				
Dajuan Harris; PG	Columbia, MO	Rock Bridge High School	6 ft 1 in (1.85 m)	160 lb (73 kg)	Aug 11, 2018
Dajuan Harris; PG	Recruit ratings: Scout: Rivals: 247Sports: (NR)				
Ja'Monta Black; SG	Columbia, MO	Rock Bridge High School	6 ft 4 in (1.93 m)	190 lb (86 kg)	Apr 14, 2018
Ja'Monta Black; SG	Recruit ratings: Scout: Rivals: 247Sports: (NR)				
Gaige Prim; PF	Aurora, CO	South Plains College	6 ft 7 in (2.01 m)	184 lb (83 kg)	Sep 29, 2018
Gaige Prim; PF	Recruit ratings: Scout: Rivals: 247Sports: (NR)				
Overall recruit ranking:
Note: In many cases, Scout, Rivals, 247Sports, On3, and ESPN may conflict in their listings of height and weight.; In these cases, the average was taken. ESPN grades are on a 100-point scale.; Sources: "2019 Team Ranking". Rivals.

== Roster ==
2019–20 Missouri State Bears men's basketball team
Players
Coaches

Pos.	#	Name	Height	Weight	Year	Previous school	Hometown
G	0	Tyrik Dixon	6 ft 1 in (1.85 m)	173 lb (78 kg)	RS Jr	Southwest Christian Academy; Middle Tennessee	Bentonville, AR
G	1	Keandre Cook	6 ft 5 in (1.96 m)	187 lb (85 kg)	Sr	Edmondson-Westside HS; Odessa College	Baltimore, MD
G	3	Spencer Brown	6 ft 2 in (1.88 m)	192 lb (87 kg)	RS Jr	Fayetteville HS; Lyon College	Fayetteville, AR
G	4	Ja'Monta Black	6 ft 3 in (1.91 m)	182 lb (83 kg)	Fr	Rock Bridge HS	Columbia, MO
F	5	Tyem Freeman	6 ft 5 in (1.96 m)	213 lb (97 kg)	Fr	Parkview HS	Springfield, IL
F	11	Isiaih Mosley	6 ft 5 in (1.96 m)	192 lb (87 kg)	Fr	Rock Bridge HS	Columbia, MO
F	15	Lamont West	6 ft 8 in (2.03 m)	221 lb (100 kg)	Sr	Miller Grove HS; West Virginia	Cincinnati, OH
G	21	Ross Owens (W)	6 ft 4 in (1.93 m)	201 lb (91 kg)	Sr	Woodlawn HS	Woodlawn, IL
F	23	Kabir Mohammed	6 ft 5 in (1.96 m)	237 lb (108 kg)	Sr	National Christian Academy; San Jacinto College	Lagos, Nigeria
G	24	Ford Cooper Jr.	6 ft 3 in (1.91 m)	175 lb (79 kg)	Fr	United Faith Christian Academy	Charlotte, NC
C	25	Darian Scott	6 ft 11 in (2.11 m)	210 lb (95 kg)	RS So	Centennial HS	Las Vegas, NV
G/F	33	Josh Hall	6 ft 7 in (2.01 m)	213 lb (97 kg)	RS Jr	Genesis Academy; Nevada	Houston, TX
F	34	Jared Ridder	6 ft 8 in (2.03 m)	216 lb (98 kg)	RS So	Kickapoo HS; Xavier	Springfield, MO
F	44	Gaige Prim	6 ft 8 in (2.03 m)	235 lb (107 kg)	Jr	Grandview HS; South Plains CC	Aurora, CO

Head coach

- Dana Ford (Illinois State)

Assistant coach(es)

- Corey Gipson (Austin Peay)
- Jake Headrick (Montevallo)
- Jase Herl (Colorado Mesa)

Legend

- (C) Team captain
- (S) Suspended
- (I) Ineligible
- (W) Walk-on
- Injured
- Current redshirt

Roster
Last update: February 5, 2020

== Schedule and results ==
Date time, TV	Rank^{#}	Opponent^{#}	Result	Record	Site city, state
Exhibition
October 30, 2019*; 7:00 pm		Washington (MO)	W 76–59		JQH Arena (3,209); Springfield, MO
Non-conference regular season
November 5, 2019*; 7:00 pm, ESPN3		Little Rock	L 66–67	0–1	JQH Arena (5,002); Springfield, MO
November 10, 2019*; 2:00 pm, KOZL/ESPN+		Alabama State	W 59–50	1–1	JQH Arena (3,639); Springfield, MO
November 12, 2019*; 7:00 pm, KOZL/ESPN+		Cleveland State	W 73–53	2–1	JQH Arena (3,800); Springfield, MO
November 15, 2019*; 6:00 pm, FSN		at No. 21 Xavier; Charleston Classic campus game	L 56–59	2–2	Cintas Center (10,463); Cincinnati, OH
November 21, 2019*; 10:30 am, ESPNU		vs. Miami (FL); Charleston Classic quarterfinals	L 70–74	2–3	TD Arena (2,914); Charleston, SC
November 22, 2019*; 1:30 pm, ESPNU		vs. Saint Joseph's; Charleston Classic consolation 2nd round	W 71–69	3–3	TD Arena (3,245); Charleston, SC
November 24, 2019*; 2:30 pm, ESPNU		vs. Buffalo; Charleston Classic 5th place game	L 74–75	3–4	TD Arena (3,122); Charleston, SC
November 29, 2019*; 7:00 pm, SECN+		at LSU	W 73-58	3–5	Pete Maravich Assembly Center (9,892); Baton Rouge, LA
December 3, 2019*; 7:00 pm, ESPN+		Murray State	W 71–69	4–5	JQH Arena (3,817); Springfield, MO
December 6, 2019*; 7:00 pm, KOZL/ESPN3		Mississippi Valley State	W 86–62	5–5	JQH Arena (3,552); Springfield, MO
December 11, 2019*; 7:00 pm, KOZL/ESPN+		Arkansas State	W 75–53	6–5	JQH Arena (3,891); Springfield, MO
December 15, 2019*; 6:00 pm, MASN		at VCU	L 51–61	6–6	Stuart C. Siegel Center (7,693); Richmond, VA
December 21, 2019*; 1:00 pm, KOZL		at Oral Roberts	L 72–82	6–7	Mabee Center (2,490); Tulsa, OK
MVC regular season
January 4, 2020; 4:00 pm, ESPN+		Evansville	W 65–52	7–7 (1–0)	JGH Arena (4,206); Springfield, MO
January 7, 2020; 7:00 pm, FSMW		at Loyola–Chicago	L 58–62	7–8 (1–1)	Joseph J. Gentile Arena (2,795); Chicago, IL
January 7, 2020; 7:00 pm, KOZL/ESPN+		at Illinois State	W 67–63	8–8 (2–1)	Redbird Arena (3,656); Normal, IL
January 11, 2020; 3:00 pm, FSMW		Northern Iowa	L 57–80	8–9 (2–2)	JGH Arena (3,520); Springfield, MO
January 15, 2020; 7:00 pm, ESPN+		Bradley	L 78–90	8–10 (2–3)	JGH Arena (4,583); Springfield, MO
January 18, 2020; 1:00 pm, ESPN+		at Evansville	W 68–58	9–10 (3–3)	Ford Center (4,591); Evansville, IN
January 23, 2020; 7:30 pm, CBSSN		at Valparaiso	W 67–60	10–10 (4–3)	JGH Arena (4,536); Springfield, Mo
January 26, 2020; 3:00 pm, ESPN3		at Drake	L 69–71	10–11 (4–4)	Knapp Center (3,593); Des Moines, IA
January 29, 2020; 6:00 pm, FSMW		at Northern Iowa	W 95–66	10–12 (4–5)	McLeod Center (4,076); Cedar Falls, IA
February 1, 2020; 3:00 pm, ESPN3		Indiana State	L 68–78	10–13 (4–6)	JGH Arena (4,284); Springfield, MO
February 5, 2020; 7:00 pm, ESPN+		Illinois State	W 80–60	11–13 (5–6)	JGH Arena (2,991); Springfield, MO
February 8, 2020; 7:00 pm, ESPN3		at Southern Illinois	L 66–68	11–14 (5–7)	Banterra Center (6,528); Carbondale, IL
February 12, 2020; 7:00 pm, ESPN+		Drake	W 97–62	12–14 (6–7)	JGH Arena (3,185); Springfield, MO
February 16, 2020; 3:00 pm, ESPNU		at Indiana State	W 71–58	13–14 (7–7)	Hulman Center (3,988); Terre Haute, IN
February 19, 2020; 7:00 pm, FSMW		at Bradley	L 79–83 ^{OT}	13–15 (7–8)	Carver Arena (5,708); Peoria, IL
February 22, 2020; 2:30 pm, CBSSN		Loyola–Chicago	W 74–62	14–15 (8–8)	JGH Arena (4,251); Springfield, MO
February 25, 2020; 7:00 pm, ESPN+		at Valparaiso	L 74–89	14–16 (8–9)	Athletics–Recreation Center (2,476); Valparaiso, IN
February 29, 2020; 6:00 pm, ESPN3		Southern Illinois	W 84–59	15–16 (9–9)	JGH Arena (3,887); Springfield, MO
Missouri Valley tournament
March 6, 2020; 8:35 pm, ESPN+	(6)	vs. (3) Indiana State; Quarterfinals	W 78–51	16–16	Enterprise Center (6,521); St. Louis, MO
March 7, 2020; 5:05 pm, CBSSN	(6)	vs. (7) Valparaiso; Semifinals	L 82–89	16–17	Enterprise Center (8,145); St. Louis, MO
*Non-conference game. ^{#}Rankings from AP Poll. (#) Tournament seedings in parentheses. All times are in Central Time.
