= 2019–20 Missouri Valley Conference men's basketball season =

- League: NCAA Division I
- Sport: Basketball
- Teams: 10
- TV partner(s): CBS, CBSSN, ESPN, ESPN2, ESPNU, ESPN3, ESPN+, FSI, FSKC, FSMW, NBCSC

Regular Season
- 2020 MVC Champion: Northern Iowa
- Season MVP: A. J. Green, Northern Iowa

Tournament
- Champions: Bradley
- Runners-up: Valparaiso
- Finals MVP: Darrell Brown Jr., Bradley

Basketball seasons
- 2018–19 2020–21

2019–20 Missouri Valley Conference men's basketball standings
| | Conf. | | | | Overall |
| Team | W | | L | PCT | W | | L | PCT |
|---|---|---|---|---|---|---|---|---|
| Northern Iowa | 14 | – | 4 | .778 | 25 | – | 6 | .806 |
| Loyola Chicago | 13 | – | 5 | .722 | 21 | – | 11 | .656 |
| Indiana State | 11 | – | 7 | .611 | 18 | – | 12 | .600 |
| Bradley † | 11 | – | 7 | .611 | 23 | – | 11 | .676 |
| Southern Illinois | 10 | – | 8 | .556 | 16 | – | 16 | .500 |
| Missouri State | 9 | – | 9 | .500 | 16 | – | 17 | .485 |
| Valparaiso | 9 | – | 9 | .500 | 19 | – | 16 | .543 |
| Drake | 8 | – | 10 | .444 | 20 | – | 14 | .588 |
| Illinois State | 5 | – | 13 | .278 | 10 | – | 21 | .323 |
| Evansville | 0 | – | 18 | .000 | 9 | – | 23 | .281 |
† 2020 MVC tournament winner

The 2019–20 Missouri Valley Conference men's basketball season began with practices in October 2019, followed by the start of the 2019–20 NCAA Division I men's basketball season on November 5, 2019. Conference play began in late December 2019 and concluded in March with the Missouri Valley Conference tournament at Enterprise Center in St. Louis, Missouri.

Northern Iowa captured the regular season title at 14–4.

Bradley defeated Valparaiso in the championship game to win the Missouri Valley Conference tournament and thereby would have received the conference's automatic bid to the NCAA tournament.

Northern Iowa, by virtue of winning the regular season title, but not winning the conference tournament, would have received the conference's automatic bid to the National Invitational tournament.

All subsequent postseason tournaments were canceled due to the COVID-19 pandemic.

== Head coaches ==
=== Changes ===
On March 6, 2019, Southern Illinois head coach Barry Hinson resigned. He finished with a seven-year record of 116–106. The school announced on March 20 that former Loyola-Chicago associate head coach (and Saluki alumnus) Bryan Mullins had been named head coach.

=== Coaches ===
| Team | Head coach | Previous job | Years at school | Overall record | MVC record | MVC titles | NCAA Tournaments |
|---|---|---|---|---|---|---|---|
| Bradley | Brian Wardle | Green Bay (Head) | 4 | 58–75 | 28–44 | 0 | 1 |
| Drake | Darian DeVries | Creighton (Assistant) | 1 | 24–10 | 12–6 | 1 | 0 |
| Evansville | Walter McCarty | Boston Celtics (Assistant) | 1 | 11–21 | 5–13 | 0 | 0 |
| Illinois State | Dan Muller | Vanderbilt (Assistant) | 7 | 139–96 | 76–50 | 1 | 0 |
| Indiana State | Greg Lansing | Indiana State (Assistant) | 9 | 148–142 | 80–82 | 0 | 1 |
| Loyola-Chicago | Porter Moser | Saint Louis (Assistant) | 8 | 141–125 | 60–82 | 2 | 1 |
| Missouri State | Dana Ford | Tennessee State (Head) | 1 | 16–16 | 10–8 | 0 | 0 |
| Northern Iowa | Ben Jacobson | Northern Iowa (Assistant) | 13 | 266–168 | 139–95 | 2 | 4 |
| Southern Illinois | Bryan Mullins | Loyola-Chicago (Assistant) | 0 | 0–0 | 0–0 | 0 | 0 |
| Valparaiso | Matt Lottich | Valparaiso (Assistant) | 3 | 54–44 | 13–23 | 0 | 0 |

Notes:

- All records, appearances, titles, etc. are from time with current school only.
- Overall and MVC records are from time at current school and are through the beginning of the season.
- Lottich and Moser's conference records only includes MVC play, not other conference records.

== Preseason ==
=== Poll ===
| Rank | Team | Points |
|---|---|---|
| 1. | Missouri State (29) | 410 |
| 2. | Bradley (5) | 368 |
| 3. | Northern Iowa (3) | 343 |
| 4. | Loyola-Chicago (6) | 340 |
| 5. | Drake | 243 |
| 6. | Indiana State | 210 |
| 7. | Illinois State (1) | 193 |
| 8. | Evansville | 132 |
| 9. | Valparaiso | 98 |
| 10. | Southern Illinois | 83 |
(First-Place Votes)

=== All-Conference Teams ===
| Honor | Recipient |
|---|---|
| Player of the Year | Cameron Krutwig, Loyola-Chicago |
First Team
| First Team | Darell Brown Jr., Bradley |
| First Team | Tulia Da Silva, Missouri State |
| First Team | A. J. Green, Northern Iowa |
| First Team | Tyreke Key, Indiana State |
| First Team | Cameron Krutwig, Loyola-Chicago |
Second Team
| Second Team | Jordan Barnes, Indiana State |
| Second Team | Elijah Childs, Bradley |
| Second Team | Keandre Cook, Missouri State |
| Second Team | Javon Freeman-Liberty, Valparaiso |
| Second Team | Ryan Vazekas, Valparaiso |
Third Team
| Third Team | Zach Copeland, Illinois State |
| Third Team | Gaige Prim, Missouri State |
| Third Team | Lamont West, Missouri State |
| Third Team | D. J. Wilkins, Drake |
| Third Team | DeAndre Williams, Evansville |
| Third Team | Lucas Williamson, Loyola-Chicago |

== Regular season ==
=== Changes ===
On December 27, 2019, Evansville placed head coach Walter McCarty on administrative leave and named current Evanville assistant coach (and former Samford head coach) Bennie Seltzer as interim head coach. McCarty was in his second season at the school with an overall record at the time of 20–25. The school terminated McCarty's contract on January 21, 2020 and announced later that same day that former Marian, Butler and Iowa head coach, as well as Evansville associate head coach, Todd Lickliter would return as head coach, effective immediately.

=== Conference Matrix ===
This table summarizes head-to-head results between teams in conference play; each team will play eighteen conference games, facing each team twice.

| | Bradley | Drake | Evansville | Illinois State | Indiana State | Loyola-Chicago | Missouri State | Northern Iowa | Southern Illinois | Valparaiso |
|---|---|---|---|---|---|---|---|---|---|---|
| vs BU | | 1–1 | 0–2 | 0–2 | 1–1 | 2–0 | 0–2 | 2–0 | 0–2 | 1–1 |
| vs DU | 1–1 | | 0–2 | 1–1 | 1–1 | 1–1 | 1–1 | 2–0 | 2–0 | 1–1 |
| vs UE | 2–0 | 2–0 | | 2–0 | 2–0 | 2–0 | 2–0 | 2–0 | 2–0 | 2–0 |
| vs IlSU | 2–0 | 1–1 | 0–2 | | 1–1 | 2–0 | 2–0 | 1–1 | 2–0 | 2–0 |
| vs InSU | 1–1 | 1–1 | 0–2 | 1–1 | | 1–1 | 1–1 | 1–1 | 0–2 | 1–1 |
| vs LU | 0–2 | 1–1 | 0–2 | 0–2 | 1–1 | | 1–1 | 1–1 | 1–1 | 0–2 |
| vs MSU | 2–0 | 1–1 | 0–2 | 0–2 | 1–1 | 1–1 | | 2–0 | 1–1 | 1–1 |
| vs UNI | 0–2 | 0–2 | 0–2 | 1–1 | 1–1 | 1–1 | 0–2 | | 1–2 | 0–2 |
| vs SIU | 2–0 | 0–2 | 0–2 | 0–2 | 2–0 | 1–1 | 1–1 | 1–1 | | 1–1 |
| vs VU | 1–1 | 1–1 | 0–2 | 0–2 | 1–1 | 2–0 | 1–1 | 2–0 | 1–1 | |
| Overall | 11–7 | 8–10 | 0–18 | 5–13 | 11–7 | 13–5 | 9–9 | 14–4 | 10–8 | 9–9 |

== Postseason ==
=== Coaches ===
| Honor | Recipient |
|---|---|
| Coach of the Year | Ben Jacobsen, Northern Iowa |

=== All-Conference Teams ===
| Honor | Recipient |
|---|---|
| Larry Bird Player of the Year | A. J. Green, Northern Iowa |
| Defensive MVP | Isaiah Brown, Northern Iowa |
| Sixth-Man of the Year | Marquise Kennedy, Loyola-Chicago |
| Newcomer of the Year | Marcus Domask, Southern Illinois |
| Freshman of the Year | Marcus Domask, Southern Illinois |
First Team
| First Team | Javon Freeman-Liberty, Valparaiso |
| First Team | A. J. Green, Northern Iowa |
| First Team | Tyreke Key, Indiana State |
| First Team | Cameron Krutwig, Loyola-Chicago |
| First Team | Austin Phyfe, Northern Iowa |
Second Team
| Second Team | Darrell Brown Jr., Bradley |
| Second Team | Elijah Childs, Bradley |
| Second Team | Keandre Cook, Missouri State |
| Second Team | Marcus Domask, Southern Illinois |
| Second Team | Liam Robbins, Drake |
Third Team
| Third Team | Jordan Barnes, Indiana State |
| Third Team | Tate Hall, Loyola-Chicago |
| Third Team | Nate Kennell, Bradley |
| Third Team | Roman Penn, Drake |
| Third Team | Gaige Prim, Missouri State |
