= Ryan Chapman =

Ryan Chapman may refer to:

- Ryan Chapman (soccer)
- Ryan Chapman (rugby union)
