= 2019–20 Illinois State Redbirds men's basketball team =

American college basketball season

2019–20 Illinois State Redbirds men's basketball
- Conference: Missouri Valley Conference
- Record: 10–21 (5–13 MVC)
- Head coach: Dan Muller (8th season)
- Associate head coach: Brian Jones
- Assistant coaches: Brian Reese; Marcus Belcher
- Home arena: Doug Collins Court at Redbird Arena

2019–20 Missouri Valley Conference men's basketball standings
	Conf.				Overall
Team	W		L	PCT	W		L	PCT
Northern Iowa	14	–	4	.778	25	–	6	.806
Loyola Chicago	13	–	5	.722	21	–	11	.656
Indiana State	11	–	7	.611	18	–	12	.600
Bradley †	11	–	7	.611	23	–	11	.676
Southern Illinois	10	–	8	.556	16	–	16	.500
Missouri State	9	–	9	.500	16	–	17	.485
Valparaiso	9	–	9	.500	19	–	16	.543
Drake	8	–	10	.444	20	–	14	.588
Illinois State	5	–	13	.278	10	–	21	.323
Evansville	0	–	18	.000	9	–	23	.281
† 2020 MVC tournament winner

The 2019–20 Illinois State Redbirds men's basketball team represented Illinois State University during the 2019–20 NCAA Division I men's basketball season. The Redbirds, led by eighth-year head coach Dan Muller, played their home games at Redbird Arena in Normal, Illinois as a member of the Missouri Valley Conference. They finished the season 10–21, 5–13 in conference play to finish in ninth place. They lost in the opening round of the MVC tournament as the number nine seed to Drake.

== Previous season ==
The Redbrids finished the season 17–16, 9–9 in MVC play to finish in a three-way tie for fifth place. As the No. 7 seed in the MVC tournament, they defeated Evansville in the first round, before losing to Drake in the quarterfinals.

== Roster ==
2019–20 Illinois State Redbirds men's basketball team
Players
Coaches

Pos.	#	Name	Height	Weight	Year	Previous school	Hometown
G	0	DJ Horne	6 ft 1 in (1.85 m)	175 lb (79 kg)	Fr	Trinity Academy	Raleigh, NC
G	1	Dedric Boyd	6 ft 4 in (1.93 m)	185 lb (84 kg)	RS So	Haywood High School; Eastern Kentucky	Brownsville, TN
G	2	Zach Copeland	6 ft 4 in (1.93 m)	195 lb (88 kg)	Sr	Berkeley High School; City College of San Francisco	Oakland, CA
G	3	Ricky Torres	6 ft 2 in (1.88 m)	180 lb (82 kg)	Sr	Pinellas Park High School; Wichita State	Pinellas Park, FL
F	4	Abdou Ndaiye	6 ft 9 in (2.06 m)	195 lb (88 kg)	RS Fr	The Nation Christian Academy	Louga, Senegal
F	5	Keith Fisher III	6 ft 8 in (2.03 m)	220 lb (100 kg)	RS Jr	Westchester Enriched Sciences Magnets; San Jose State	Los Angeles, CA
G	12	Antonio Reeves	6 ft 4 in (1.93 m)	185 lb (84 kg)	Fr	Simeon Career Academy	Chicago, IL
F	13	Rey Idowu	6 ft 9 in (2.06 m)	240 lb (109 kg)	So	Clearwater Academy	Melbourne, FL
G	14	Hank Beard (W)	6 ft 0 in (1.83 m)	177 lb (80 kg)	Sr	Seminole High School; South Florida; Newman	Seminole, FL
G	15	Lijah Donnelly (W)	6 ft 2 in (1.88 m)	175 lb (79 kg)	RS Jr	Bloomington High School; Illinois–Springfield	Bloomington, IL
G	22	Matt Chastain	6 ft 6 in (1.98 m)	210 lb (95 kg)	RS Jr	Le Roy High School; Loyola–Chicago	Le Roy, IL
F	23	Harouna Sissoko (redshirt)	6 ft 7 in (2.01 m)	210 lb (95 kg)	Fr	Grand View Christian School	Kayes, Mali
G	25	Jaycee Hillsman	6 ft 6 in (1.98 m)	230 lb (104 kg)	RS Sr	Simeon Career Academy; San Jose State	Champaign, IL
F	32	Taylor Bruninga	6 ft 8 in (2.03 m)	210 lb (95 kg)	RS So	Illini Bluffs High School	Mapleton, IL
G	34	Matt Miller (W) (redshirt)	6 ft 4 in (1.93 m)	210 lb (95 kg)	Fr	Shelbyville High School	Shelbyville, IL

Head coach

- Dan Muller (Illinois State)

Assistant coach(es)

- Brian Jones (Northern Iowa)
- Brian Reese (North Carolina)
- Marcus Belcher (Southern Illinois)

Legend

- (C) Team captain
- (S) Suspended
- (I) Ineligible
- (W) Walk-on
- Injured
- Current redshirt

Roster
Last update: January 19, 2020

== Schedule and results ==
Date time, TV	Rank^{#}	Opponent^{#}	Result	Record	High points	High rebounds	High assists	Site (attendance) city, state
Exhibition season
October 23, 2019*; 6:00 pm		Truman State	W 74–68		18 – Copeland	11 – Hillsman	3 – Copeland, Horne	Doug Collins Court at Redbird Arena (3,098); Normal, IL
Non-conference regular season
November 6, 2019*; 7:00 pm, ESPN+		Belmont	W 79–72	1–0	20 – Copeland	6 – Hillsman, Copeland	6 – Torres	Doug Collins Court at Redbird Arena (5,310); Normal, IL
November 10, 2019*; 3:00 pm, ESPN3		Little Rock	W 75–70	2–0	19 – Copeland	6 – Idowu	6 – Torres	Doug Collins Court at Redbird Arena (3,988); Normal, IL
November 17, 2019*; 1:00 pm, NBCSCH		UCF	L 65–67	2–1	22 – Boyd	8 – Idowu	4 – Copeland, Chastain	Doug Collins Court at Redbird Arena (4,372); Normal, IL
November 22, 2019*; 4:45 pm, FloHoops		vs. Cincinnati; Paradise Jam [Quarterfinal]	L 65–66	2–2	19 – Boyd	11 – Ndaiye	6 – Torres	Sports and Fitness Center (1,924); St. Thomas, USVI
November 23, 2019*; 4:00 pm, FloHoops		vs. Western Kentucky; Paradise Jam [Consolation Semifinal]	L 69–83	2–3	15 – Torres	8 – Fisher III	5 – Boyd	Sports and Fitness Center (2,024); St. Thomas, USVI
November 25, 2019*; 12:00 pm, FloHoops		vs. Grand Canyon; Paradise Jam [Seventh Place]	L 63–68	2–4	21 – Copeland	7 – Hillsman	5 – Chastain	Sports and Fitness Center (924); St. Thomas, USVI
November 29, 2019*; 2:00 pm, ESPN3		UIS	W 76–57	3–4	18 – Copeland	6 – Idowu, Ndaiye	2 – Hillsman, Idowu, Reeves	Doug Collins Court at Redbird Arena (3,708); Normal, IL
December 3, 2019*; 8:00 pm, FSSW+		at TCU	L 69–81	3–5	19 – Copeland	7 – Hillsman	3 – Copeland, Torres, Chastain	Schollmaier Arena (5,991); Fort Worth, TX
December 7, 2019*; 6:00 pm, NBCSCH		Morehead State	W 61–50	4–5	16 – Copeland	9 – Fisher III	3 – Chastain	Doug Collins Court at Redbird Arena (4,364); Normal, IL
December 15, 2019*; 1:00 pm, FSOH		at Northern Kentucky	L 64–79	4–6	14 – Idowu	6 – Fisher III	4 – Horne	BB&T Arena (2,820); Highland Heights, KY
December 18, 2019*; 6:00 pm, ESPN3		UIC	W 67–66	5–6	16 – Fisher III, Idowu	14 – Fisher III	5 – Copeland, Torres	Doug Collins Court at Redbird Arena (3,563); Normal, IL
December 21, 2019*; 3:00 pm, CUSA.tv		at UTSA	L 70–89	5–7	20 – Fisher III	7 – Fisher III	3 – Idowu	Convocation Center (853); San Antonio, TX
Missouri Valley Conference regular season
December 31, 2019; 2:00 pm, NBCSCH		Northern Iowa	W 76–70	6–7 (1–0)	22 – Horne	3 – Hillsman, Idowu, Horne, Reeves	4 – Horne	Doug Collins Court at Redbird Arena (5,190); Normal, IL
January 4, 2020; 3:00 pm, ESPN3		at Southern Illinois	L 55–67	6–8 (1–1)	13 – Hillsman	5 – Fisher III	3 – Torres	Banterra Center (4,580); Carbondale, IL
January 7, 2020; 7:00 pm, ESPN+		Missouri State	L 63–67	6–9 (1–2)	16 – Reeves	8 – Hillsman	7 – Torres	Doug Collins Court at Redbird Arena (3,656); Normal, IL
January 11, 2020; 1:00 pm, ESPN+		at Indiana State	L 52–65	6–10 (1–3)	18 – Horne	9 – Hillsman	2 – Copeland, Reeves	Hulman Center (3,723); Terre Haute, IN
January 16, 2020; 7:00 pm, Mediacom/ ESPN+		at Drake	L 74–84	6–11 (1–4)	32 – Copeland	10 – Fisher III	7 – Copeland	The Knapp Center (2,641); Des Moines, IA
January 19, 2020; 3:00 pm, ESPNU		Loyola–Chicago	L 50–62	6–12 (1–5)	17 – Copeland	5 – Fisher III, Ndaiye	4 – Torres	Doug Collins Court at Redbird Arena (5,171); Normal, IL
January 22, 2020; 7:00 pm, ESPN+		at Bradley; I–74 Rivalry	L 63–75	6–13 (1–6)	17 – Fisher III, Horne	7 – Fisher III	5 – Copeland	Carver Arena (7,303); Peoria, IL
January 25, 2020; 2:00 pm, ESPN3		Southern Illinois	L 55–58	6–14 (1–7)	24 – Copeland	6 – Hillsman, Copeland, Fisher III	3 – Copeland	Doug Collins Court at Redbird Arena (5,096); Normal, IL
January 29, 2020; 7:00 pm, ESPN+		Evansville	W 77–66	7–14 (2–7)	20 – Hillsman	9 – Fisher III	7 – Copeland	Doug Collins Court at Redbird Arena (4,022); Normal, IL
February 1, 2020; 7:00 pm, ESPN3		at Valparaiso	L 70–80	7–15 (2–8)	19 – Fisher III	7 – Fisher III, Idowu	4 – Torres	Athletics-Recreation Center (3,220); Valparaiso, IN
February 5, 2020; 7:00 pm, ESPN+		at Missouri State	L 60–80	7–16 (2–9)	17 – Reeves	5 – Ndaiye	2 – Hillsman, Donnelly, Fisher III, Boyd	JQH Arena (2,991); Springfield, MO
February 8, 2020; 7:00 pm, NBCSCH+		Indiana State	W 74–67	8–16 (3–9)	23 – Hillsman	9 – Hillsman, Fisher III	2 – Hillsman, Copeland, Fisher III	Doug Collins Court at Redbird Arena (5,365); Normal, IL
February 12, 2020; 7:00 pm, ESPN+		at Northern Iowa	L 63–71	8–17 (3–10)	16 – Horne	6 – Horne	3 – Hillsman, Fisher III	McLeod Center (4,477); Cedar Falls, IA
February 15, 2020; 6:00 pm, MVC TV Network (FSIN/FSKC/FSMW/NBCSCH)		Valparaiso	L 62–65	8–18 (3–11)	17 – Copeland	10 – Fisher III	2 – Copeland, Horne	Doug Collins Court at Redbird Arena (4,529); Normal, IL
February 19, 2020; 7:00 pm, NBCSCH		at Loyola–Chicago	L 69–84	8–19 (3–12)	16 – Copeland	5 – Bruninga, Horne	5 – Copeland	Joseph J. Gentile Arena (3,105); Chicago, IL
February 22, 2020; 3:30 pm, MVC TV Network		Drake	W 57–53	9–19 (4–12)	21 – Fisher III	7 – Fisher III, Horne, Reeves	5 – Torres	Doug Collins Court at Redbird Arena (5,063); Normal, IL
February 26, 2020; 6:00 pm, CBSSN		Bradley; I–74 Rivalry	L 71–74 ^{OT}	9–20 (4–13)	23 – Fisher III	8 – Fisher III	5 – Copeland	Doug Collins Court at Redbird Arena (5,541); Normal, IL
February 29, 2020; 1:00 pm, ESPN3		at Evansville	W 71–60	10–20 (5–13)	24 – Horne	7 – Chastain, Horne	4 – Copeland	Ford Center (4,983); Evansville, IN
State Farm Missouri Valley Conference tournament
March 5, 2020*; 6:05 pm, MVC TV Network/ ESPN+	(9)	vs. (8) Drake; Opening Round	L 65–75	10–21	14 – Fisher III	10 – Fisher III	3 – Copeland	Enterprise Center (5,212); St. Louis, MO
*Non-conference game. ^{#}Rankings from AP Poll. (#) Tournament seedings in parentheses. All times are in Central Standard Time.
