= 2019–20 Indiana State Sycamores men's basketball team =

American college basketball season

2019–20 Indiana State Sycamores men's basketball
- Conference: Missouri Valley Conference
- Record: 18–12 (11–7 MVC)
- Head coach: Greg Lansing (10th season)
- Assistant coaches: Terry Parker; Brett Carey; Kareem Richardson
- Home arena: Hulman Center

2019–20 Missouri Valley Conference men's basketball standings
	Conf.				Overall
Team	W		L	PCT	W		L	PCT
Northern Iowa	14	–	4	.778	25	–	6	.806
Loyola Chicago	13	–	5	.722	21	–	11	.656
Indiana State	11	–	7	.611	18	–	12	.600
Bradley †	11	–	7	.611	23	–	11	.676
Southern Illinois	10	–	8	.556	16	–	16	.500
Missouri State	9	–	9	.500	16	–	17	.485
Valparaiso	9	–	9	.500	19	–	16	.543
Drake	8	–	10	.444	20	–	14	.588
Illinois State	5	–	13	.278	10	–	21	.323
Evansville	0	–	18	.000	9	–	23	.281
† 2020 MVC tournament winner

The 2019–20 Indiana State Sycamores men's basketball team represented Indiana State University in the 2019–20 NCAA Division I men's basketball season. The Sycamores, led by 10th-year head coach Greg Lansing, played their home games at the Hulman Center in Terre Haute, Indiana as members of the Missouri Valley Conference. They finished the season 18–12, 11–7 in MVC play to finish in a tie for third place. They lost in the quarterfinals of the MVC tournament to Missouri State.

== Previous season ==
The Sycamores finished the 2018–19 season 15–16, 7–11 in MVC play to finish in a tie for eighth place. As the No. 8 seed in the MVC tournament, they lost to Valparaiso in the first round.

== Roster ==
2019–20 Indiana State Sycamores men's basketball team
Players
Coaches

Pos.	#	Name	Height	Weight	Year	Previous school	Hometown
G	0	Jared Hankins	6 ft 4 in (1.93 m)	200 lb (91 kg)	Fr	Lawrence North High School	Indianapolis, Indiana
C	1	Tre Williams	6 ft 7 in (2.01 m)	245 lb (111 kg)	Fr	Woodstock Academy	Reynoldsburg, Ohio
G	2	Jordan Barnes	5 ft 10 in (1.78 m)	160 lb (73 kg)	Sr	Christian Brothers High School	St. Louis, Missouri
G	3	Cam Bacote	6 ft 3 in (1.91 m)	170 lb (77 kg)	RS So	Bethel High School; Maryland Eastern Shore	Hampton, Virginia
G	4	Cooper Neese	6 ft 4 in (1.93 m)	190 lb (86 kg)	RS So	Cloverdale High School	Cloverdale, Indiana
C	5	Bronson Kessinger	6 ft 7 in (2.01 m)	232 lb (105 kg)	Sr	Corydon Central High School	Corydon, Indiana
G	10	Christian Williams	6 ft 6 in (1.98 m)	195 lb (88 kg)	RS Sr	St. Teresa High School; Iowa	Decatur, Illinois
G	11	Tyreke Key	6 ft 2 in (1.88 m)	205 lb (93 kg)	Jr	Clay County High School (TN)	Celina, Tennessee
G	20	Cobie Barnes	6 ft 5 in (1.96 m)	215 lb (98 kg)	Fr	Floyd Central High School	Floyds Knobs, Indiana
G	23	De'Avion Washington	6 ft 3 in (1.91 m)	212 lb (96 kg)	So	Terre Haute South Vigo High School	Terre Haute, Indiana
G	25	Keon Sellers	6 ft 4 in (1.93 m)	180 lb (82 kg)	Fr	Lake Central High School	St. John, Indiana
C	34	Christopher Agbo	6 ft 8 in (2.03 m)	275 lb (125 kg)	Jr	Covenant Christian Academy; Pearl River Community College	Marietta, Georgia
G/F	35	Jake LaRavia	6 ft 8 in (2.03 m)	215 lb (98 kg)	Fr	Lawrence Central High School	Indianapolis, Indiana

Head coach

- Greg Lansing (South Dakota)

Assistant coach(es)

- Terry Parker (Louisiana Tech)
- Brett Carey (UNC Asheville)
- Kareem Richardson (Evansville)

Legend

- (C) Team captain
- (S) Suspended
- (I) Ineligible
- (W) Walk-on
- Injured
- Current redshirt

Roster
Last update: January 19, 2020

== During the season ==
ISU coach Greg Lansing began the season with 148 wins, which places him second on the ISU Coaching Leaderboard, the leader Duane Klueh has 182. Junior Guard Tyreke Key became the 40th member of the ISU 1,000-pt Club; on December 30, 2019, vs. Southern Illinois, Key dropped 20 points to surpass 1,000 career points. Key reached the 1,000 point mark in just 73 career games which is the fourth-fastest pace in program history.

As of January 29, Key had 8 games in which he scored 20 or more points and led the Sycamores with a 17.2 ppg. On February 16; Jordan Barnes recorded 2 steals during the game, giving him 129 for his career. Barnes became the only player in 125-seasons of Sycamore Basketball to reach the Top 10 in scoring (1,496), 3-pt FGs (265), assists (369) & steals (129).

As of March 2, Lansing has reached 166 wins, 91 MVC wins (the 11th highest total in MVC history. Jordan Barnes has increased his career totals; 1,544 points, 271 3-pointers, 383 assists and 134 steals. Tyreke Key has climbed to #19 on the ISU career scoring charts.

== Schedule and results ==
Date time, TV	Rank^{#}	Opponent^{#}	Result	Record	Site (attendance) city, state
Non-conference regular season
November 9, 2019*; 7:00 pm, ESPN+		at Dayton	L 81–86	0–1	UD Arena (13,407); Dayton, OH
November 13, 2019*; 8:00 pm, ACCN		at Louisville	L 62–91	0–2	KFC Yum! Center (14,808); Louisville, KY
November 17, 2019*; 4:30 pm, ESPN3		vs. Ball State	L 55–69	0–3	Bankers Life Fieldhouse (2,425); Indianapolis, IN
November 21, 2019*; 6:30 pm, FloHoops		vs. Duquesne; Junkanoo Jam	L 71–74	0–4	Gateway Christian Academy (300); Bimini, Bahamas
November 22, 2019*; 4:00 pm, FloHoops		vs. Loyola Marymount; Junkanoo Jam	W 72–60	1–4	Gateway Christian Academy (150); Bimini, Bahamas
November 24, 2019*; 4:00 pm, FloHoops		vs. Air Force; Junkanoo Jam	W 84–74	2–4	Gateway Christian Academy (150); Bimini, Bahamas
November 30, 2019*; 2:00 pm, ESPN3		Missouri-St. Louis	W 62–55	3–4	Hulman Center (3,553); Terre Haute, IN
December 3, 2019*; 5:30 pm, ESPN+		North Dakota State	W 71–60	4–4	Hulman Center (3,371); Terre Haute, IN
December 7, 2019*; 2:00 pm, ESPN+		at Wright State	W 84–77 ^{OT}	5–4	Nutter Center (3,509); Fairborn, OH
December 18, 2019*; 7:00 pm, ESPN3		Tennessee State	W 78–72	6–4	Hulman Center (3,123); Terre Haute, IN
December 22, 2019*; 2:00 pm, ESPN3		Chicago State	W 85–64	7–4	Hulman Center (3,449); Terre Haute, IN
Missouri Valley regular season
December 30, 2019; 8:00 pm, FS Indiana/NBCSC/FSGO/ESPN+		Southern Illinois	W 68–56	8–4 (1–0)	Hulman Center (3,333); Terre Haute, IN
January 4, 2020; 6:00 pm, ESPN+		at Drake	L 76–80	8–5 (1–1)	Knapp Center (3,490); Des Moines, IA
January 7, 2020; 8:00 pm, ESPN+		at Northern Iowa	L 60–68	8–6 (1–2)	McLeod Center (3,697); Cedar Falls, IA
January 11, 2020; 2:00 pm, ESPN+		Illinois State	W 65–52	9–6 (2–2)	Hulman Center (3,723); Terre Haute, IN
January 15, 2020; 7:00 pm, ESPN+		Evansville	W 65–42	10–6 (3–2)	Hulman Center (3,717); Terre Haute, IN
January 18, 2020; 8:00 pm, ESPN+		at Valparaiso	L 77–86	10–7 (3–3)	Athletics-Recreation Center (2,805); Valparaiso, IN
January 22, 2020; 8:00 pm, ESPN+		at Loyola–Chicago	L 55–75	10–8 (3–4)	Joseph J. Gentile Arena (2,661); Chicago, IL
January 25, 2020; 2:00 pm, FS Indiana/NBCSC/FSGO/ESPN+		Bradley	W 61–53	11–8 (4–4)	Hulman Center (4,159); Terre Haute, IN
January 29, 2020; 7:00 pm, ESPN+		Drake	W 58–56	12–8 (5–4)	Hulman Center (3,414); Terre Haute, IN
February 1, 2020; 4:00 pm, ESPN3		at Missouri State	W 78–68	13–8 (6–4)	JQH Arena (4,542); Springfield, MO
February 5, 2020; 6:00 pm, CBSSN		Loyola–Chicago	W 68–39	14–8 (7–4)	Hulman Center (4,063); Terre Haute, IN
February 8, 2020; 8:00 pm, NBCSC+/ESPN3		at Illinois State	L 67–74	14–9 (7–5)	Redbird Arena (5,365); Normal, IL
February 12, 2020; 8:00 pm, FS Indiana/NBCSC/FSGO/ESPN+		at Bradley	L 61–72	14–10 (7–6)	Carver Arena (5,023); Peoria, IL
February 16, 2020; 4:00 pm, ESPNU		Missouri State	L 58–71	14–11 (7–7)	Hulman Center (3,988); Terre Haute, IN
February 20, 2020; 7:00 pm, ESPN+		Northern Iowa	W 67–64	15–11 (8–7)	Hulman Center (3,765); Terre Haute, IN
February 23, 2020; 2:00 pm, ESPN3		at Evansville	W 64–62	16–11 (9–7)	Ford Center (5,477); Evansville, IN
February 26, 2020; 8:00 pm, ESPN+		at Southern Illinois	W 77–68	17–11 (10–7)	Banterra Center (6,550); Carbondale, IL
February 29, 2020; 6:00 pm, ESPN3		Valpariso	W 71–58	18–11 (11–7)	Hulman Center (4,131); Terre Haute, IN
MVC tournament
March 6, 2020; 9:35 pm, ESPN+	(3)	vs. (6) Missouri State; Quarterfinals	L 51–78	18–12	Enterprise Center (6,521); St. Louis, MO
*Non-conference game. ^{#}Rankings from AP Poll. (#) Tournament seedings in parentheses. All times are in Eastern.
