= 2019–20 Bradley Braves men's basketball team =

American college basketball season

2019–20 Bradley Braves men's basketball

MVC tournament champions
- Conference: Missouri Valley Conference
- Record: 23–11 (11–7 MVC)
- Head coach: Brian Wardle (5th season)
- Assistant coaches: Drew Adams; Mike Bargen; Jimmie Foster
- Home arena: Carver Arena

2019–20 Missouri Valley Conference men's basketball standings
	Conf.				Overall
Team	W		L	PCT	W		L	PCT
Northern Iowa	14	–	4	.778	25	–	6	.806
Loyola Chicago	13	–	5	.722	21	–	11	.656
Indiana State	11	–	7	.611	18	–	12	.600
Bradley †	11	–	7	.611	23	–	11	.676
Southern Illinois	10	–	8	.556	16	–	16	.500
Missouri State	9	–	9	.500	16	–	17	.485
Valparaiso	9	–	9	.500	19	–	16	.543
Drake	8	–	10	.444	20	–	14	.588
Illinois State	5	–	13	.278	10	–	21	.323
Evansville	0	–	18	.000	9	–	23	.281
† 2020 MVC tournament winner

The 2019–20 Bradley Braves men's basketball team represented Bradley University during the 2019–20 NCAA Division I men's basketball season. The Braves, led by fifth-year head coach Brian Wardle, played their home games at Carver Arena in Peoria, Illinois as members of the Missouri Valley Conference. They finished the season 23–11, 11–7 in MVC play to finish in a tie for third place. They defeated Southern Illinois, Drake, and Valparaiso to be champions of the MVC tournament for the second consecutive year. They received the MVC's automatic bid to the NCAA Tournament, but the tournament was cancelled in an effort to reduce the spread of COVID-19.

== Previous season ==
The Braves finished the 2018–19 season 20–15, 9–9 in MVC play to finish in a three-way tie for fifth place. As the No. 5 seed in the MVC tournament, they defeated Missouri State, Loyola, and Northern Iowa to win the tournament championship. As a result, they received the conference's automatic bid to the NCAA tournament as the No. 15 seed in the East region. There they lost to No. 2-seeded Michigan State in the first round.

== Offseason ==
=== 2019 recruiting class ===
College recruiting information
Name	Hometown	School	Height	Weight	Commit date
Stephan Gabriel; SF	Maplewood, NJ	NTSI Prep (Orlando, FL)	6 ft 7 in (2.01 m)	215 lb (98 kg)	Sep 14, 2018
Stephan Gabriel; SF	Recruit ratings: Scout: Rivals: 247Sports: (NR)				
JaMir Price; SG	Rock Island, IL	Rock Island High School	6 ft 2 in (1.88 m)	170 lb (77 kg)	09/26/2018 (to spend a year at prep school and enter Bradley in fall of 2020)
JaMir Price; SG	Recruit ratings: Scout: Rivals: 247Sports: (NR)				
Ville Tahvanainen; PG/SG	Helsinki, Finland	Helsinki Basketball Academy	6 ft 4 in (1.93 m)	210 lb (95 kg)	Sep 29, 2018
Ville Tahvanainen; PG/SG	Recruit ratings: Scout: Rivals: 247Sports: (NR)				
Antonio Thomas; PG	Memphis, TN	Memphis East High School	6 ft 2 in (1.88 m)	170 lb (77 kg)	Sep 17, 2018
Antonio Thomas; PG	Recruit ratings: Scout: Rivals: 247Sports: (NR)				
Rienk Mast; PF	Groningen, Netherlands	Donar	6 ft 9 in (2.06 m)	215 lb (98 kg)	Jan 20, 2019
Rienk Mast; PF	Recruit ratings: Scout: Rivals: 247Sports: (NR)				
Danya Kingsby; PG/SG	Milwaukee, WI	Arlington Country Day (Jacksonville, FL)	6 ft 2 in (1.88 m)	180 lb (82 kg)	Mar 29, 2019
Danya Kingsby; PG/SG	Recruit ratings: Scout: Rivals: 247Sports: (NR)				
Overall recruit ranking: Scout: – Rivals: –
Note: In many cases, Scout, Rivals, 247Sports, On3, and ESPN may conflict in their listings of height and weight.; In these cases, the average was taken. ESPN grades are on a 100-point scale.; Sources: "Bradley Commit List for 2019". Rivals.; "Men's Basketball Recruiting". Scout.; "ESPN – Bradley Braves Basketball Recruiting 2019". ESPN.; "Scout.com Team Recruiting Rankings". Scout.; "2019 Team Ranking". Rivals.

== Roster ==
2019–20 Bradley Braves men's basketball team
Players
Coaches

Pos.	#	Name	Height	Weight	Year	Previous school	Hometown
G	0	Danya Kingsby	6 ft 1 in (1.85 m)	180 lb (82 kg)	Jr	Hamilton HS; Southern Idaho	Milwaukee, WI
C	1	Ari Boya	7 ft 1 in (2.16 m)	240 lb (109 kg)	So	Scotland Prep	Douala, Cameroon
G	2	Antonio Thomas	6 ft 2 in (1.88 m)	190 lb (86 kg)	Fr	East HS	Memphis, TN
G	4	Terry Nolan, Jr.	6 ft 4 in (1.93 m)	190 lb (86 kg)	Jr	Our Lady of Mount Carmel HS; George Washington	Baltimore, MD
G	5	Darrell Brown	5 ft 10 in (1.78 m)	190 lb (86 kg)	Sr	Germantown HS	Memphis, TN
F	10	Elijah Childs	6 ft 7 in (2.01 m)	225 lb (102 kg)	Jr	Lee's Summit West HS	Kansas City, MO
C	12	Koch Bar	6 ft 11 in (2.11 m)	230 lb (104 kg)	Sr	Arlington County Day School	Abyei, South Sudan
G	13	Sean Houpt	6 ft 4 in (1.93 m)	195 lb (88 kg)	Fr	Danville HS	Danville, IL
G/F	14	Riley Burger	6 ft 5 in (1.96 m)	195 lb (88 kg)	Fr	Totino-Grace HS	Orono, MN
G	21	Kevin McAdoo	6 ft 2 in (1.88 m)	180 lb (82 kg)	Jr	West Bloomfield HS; Eastern Michigan	Pontiac, MI
F	22	Ja'Shon Henry	6 ft 6 in (1.98 m)	225 lb (102 kg)	So	Athol Murray College of Notre Dame	Saskatoon, Saskatchewan
G	23	Ville Tahvanainen	6 ft 4 in (1.93 m)	205 lb (93 kg)	Fr	Helsinki Basketball Academy	Helsinki, Finland
G	25	Nate Kennell	6 ft 6 in (1.98 m)	210 lb (95 kg)	Sr	Metamora Township HS	Metamora, IL
F	51	Rienk Mast	6 ft 9 in (2.06 m)	230 lb (104 kg)	Fr	Donar Groningen	Groningen, Netherlands

Head coach

- Brian Wardle (Marquette)

Assistant coach(es)

- Drew Adams (Tennessee)
- Mike Bargen (Marquette)
- Jimmie Foster (South Dakota)

Legend

- (C) Team captain
- (S) Suspended
- (I) Ineligible
- (W) Walk-on
- Injured
- Current redshirt

Roster
Last update: February 5, 2020

== Schedule and results ==
Date time, TV	Rank^{#}	Opponent^{#}	Result	Record	Site (attendance) city, state
Exhibition
October 29, 2019*; 6:00 pm		Millikin	W 91–52		Carver Arena (4,495); Peoria, IL
Non-conference regular season
November 5, 2019*; 6:00 pm, ESPN+		at Saint Joseph's	L 81–86	0–1	Hagan Arena (2,068); Philadelphia, PA
November 9, 2019*; 7:00 pm, ESPN+		IUPUI	W 90–56	1–1	Carver Arena (5,518); Peoria, IL
November 16, 2019*; 7:00 pm, ESPN3		UIC	W 65–56	2–1	Carver Arena (5,411); Peoria, IL
November 19, 2019*; 6:00 pm, ESPN+		Norfolk State; Fort Myers Tip-Off campus game	W 69–57	3–1	Carver Arena (4,813); Peoria, IL
November 22, 2019*; 6:00 pm, ESPN3		Radford; Fort Myers Tip-Off campus game	W 70–61	4–1	Carver Arena (5,167); Peoria, IL
November 25, 2019*; 7:30 pm, FS1		vs. Northwestern; Fort Myers Tip-Off semifinals	L 51–78	4–2	Suncoast Credit Union Arena (2,286); Fort Myers, FL
November 27, 2019*; 5:00 pm, FS1		vs. Kansas State; Fort Myers Tip-Off 3rd Place Game	W 73–60	5–2	Suncoast Credit Union Arena (2,210); Fort Myers, FL
December 3, 2019*; 8:00 pm, CBSSN		at No. 15 Memphis	L 56–71	5–3	FedEx Forum (15,517); Memphis, TN
December 7, 2019*; 1:00 pm, ESPN+		North Carolina A&T	W 83–52	6–3	Carver Arena (5,087); Peoria, IL
December 10, 2019*; 6:00 pm, ESPN3		Maryville	W 91–58	7–3	Carver Arena (4,643); Peoria, IL
December 15, 2019*; 4:00 pm, ESPN3		Georgia Southern	W 81–51	8–3	Carver Arena (4,904); Peoria, IL
December 21, 2019*; 1:00 pm, ESPN+		at Miami (OH)	L 55–71	8–4	Millett Hall (1,011); Oxford, OH
Dec 28, 2019*; 1:00 pm, ESPN+		Toledo	W 78–66	9–4	Carver Arena (5,293); Peoria, IL
Missouri Valley Conference regular season
Dec 31, 2019; 6:00 pm, ESPN+		Drake	W 80–72	10–4 (1–0)	Carver Arena (5,416); Peoria, IL
Jan 4, 2020; 7:00 pm, ESPNU		at Northern Iowa	L 64–69	10–5 (1–1)	McLeod Center (6,650); Cedar Falls, IA
Jan 8, 2020; 6:00 pm, ESPN+		at Evansville	W 72–52	11–5 (2–1)	Ford Center (4,489); Evansville, IN
Jan 11, 2020; 7:00 pm, ESPN+		Southern Illinois	W 67–48	12–5 (3–1)	Carver Arena (5,684); Peoria, IL
Jan 15, 2020; 7:00 pm, ESPN+		at Missouri State	W 91–78	13–5 (4–1)	JQH Arena (4,583); Springfield, MO
Jan 18, 2020; 5:00 pm, ESPN2		Northern Iowa	L 71–86	13–6 (4–2)	Carver Arena (6,774); Peoria, IL
Jan 22, 2020; 7:00 pm, ESPN+		Illinois State	W 75–63	14–6 (5–2)	Carver Arena (7,303); Peoria, IL
Jan 25, 2020; 1:00 pm, ESPN+		at Indiana State	L 53–61	14–7 (5–3)	Hulman Center (4,159); Terre Haute, IN
Jan 29, 2020; 6:00 pm, ESPN+		Valparaiso	W 80–69	15–7 (6–3)	Carver Arena (5,038); Peoria, IL
Feb 1, 2020; 7:00 pm, ESPN2		at Loyola–Chicago	L 51–62	15–8 (6–4)	Joseph J. Gentile Center (4,963); Chicago, IL
Feb 5, 2020; 8:00 pm, ESPN+		at Drake	L 60–73	15–9 (6–5)	Knapp Center (3,328); Des Moines, IA
Feb 9, 2020 w, CBSSN		at Evansville	W 69–58	16–9 (7–5)	Carver Arena (5,719); Peoria, IL
Feb 12, 2020; 7:00 pm, ESPN+		Indiana State	W 72–61	17–9 (8–5)	Carver Arena (5,023); Peoria, IL
Feb 15, 2020; 1:00 pm, CBSSN		at Southern Illinois	W 69–67	18–9 (9–5)	Banterra Center (5,766); Carbondale, IL
Feb 19, 2020; 7:00 pm, ESPN+		Missouri State	W 83–79 ^{OT}	19–9 (10–5)	Carver Arena (5,708); Peoria, IL
Feb 22, 2020; 7:00 pm, ESPN+		at Valparaiso	L 78–90	19–10 (10–6)	Athletics-Recreation Center (3,237); Valparaiso, IN
Feb 26, 2020; 6:00 pm, CBSSN		at Illinois State	W 74–71 ^{OT}	20–10 (11–6)	Redbird Arena (5,541); Normal, IL
Feb 29, 2020; 6:00 pm, ESPN3		Loyola–Chicago	L 66–67	20–11 (11–7)	Carver Arena (8,558); Peoria, IL
Missouri Valley tournament
March 6, 2020; 2:35 pm, ESPN+	(4)	vs. (5) Southern Illinois; Quarterfinals	W 64–59	21–11	Enterprise Center (7,399); St. Louis, MO
March 7, 2020; 2:35 pm, CBSSN	(4)	vs. (8) Drake; Semifinals	W 76–66	22–11	Enterprise Center (8,145); St. Louis, MO
March 8, 2020; 1:05 pm, CBS	(4)	vs. (7) Valparaiso; Championship	W 80–66	23–11	Enterprise Center (8,016); St. Louis, MO
NCAA tournament
			Cancelled due to the COVID-19 pandemic		
*Non-conference game. ^{#}Rankings from AP Poll. (#) Tournament seedings in parentheses. All times are in Central Time.
