= 2019–20 Evansville Purple Aces men's basketball team =

American college basketball season

2019–20 Evansville Purple Aces men's basketball
- Conference: Missouri Valley Conference
- Record: 9–23 (0–18 MVC)
- Head coach: Walter McCarty (placed on admin. leave on Dec. 27, fired on Jan. 21) Bennie Seltzer (interim, from Dec. 27 to Jan. 21) Todd Lickliter (starting Jan. 21)
- Assistant coaches: Bennie Seltzer; Logan Baumann; Terrence Commodore
- Home arena: Ford Center

2019–20 Missouri Valley Conference men's basketball standings
	Conf.				Overall
Team	W		L	PCT	W		L	PCT
Northern Iowa	14	–	4	.778	25	–	6	.806
Loyola Chicago	13	–	5	.722	21	–	11	.656
Indiana State	11	–	7	.611	18	–	12	.600
Bradley †	11	–	7	.611	23	–	11	.676
Southern Illinois	10	–	8	.556	16	–	16	.500
Missouri State	9	–	9	.500	16	–	17	.485
Valparaiso	9	–	9	.500	19	–	16	.543
Drake	8	–	10	.444	20	–	14	.588
Illinois State	5	–	13	.278	10	–	21	.323
Evansville	0	–	18	.000	9	–	23	.281
† 2020 MVC tournament winner

The 2019–20 Evansville Purple Aces men's basketball team represented the University of Evansville during the 2019–20 NCAA Division I men's basketball season. The Purple Aces played their home games at the Ford Center as members of the Missouri Valley Conference (MVC). They finished the season 9–23, 0–18 in MVC play to finish in last place. They lost in the first round of the MVC tournament to Valparaiso.

They were coached by Walter McCarty until he was placed on administrative leave on December 27 for alleged Title IX violations and ultimately fired on January 21. Assistant coach Bennie Seltzer acted as interim coach until Todd Lickliter was hired as the new head coach.

== Previous season ==
The Purple Aces finished the 2018–19 season 11–21, 5–13 in MVC play to finish in last place. As the No. 10 seed in the MVC tournament, they lost to Illinois State in the first round.

== Offseason ==
=== Departures ===
Name	Number	Pos.	Height	Weight	Year	Hometown	Reason for departure
Marty Hill	1	G	6'5"	180	Senior	Brooklyn Park, MN	Graduated
Jared Chestnut	12	G	6'2"	180	Senior	Evansville, IN	Graduated
Dainius Chatkevičius	14	C	6'9"	240	RS Senior	Klaipėda, Lithuania	Graduated
Shea Feehan	25	G	6'0"	155	RS Senior	Peoria, IL	Graduated

=== Incoming transfers ===
Name	Number	Pos.	Height	Weight	Year	Hometown	Notes
Peace Ilegomah	42	F	6'9"	240	Junior	Benin City, Nigeria	Transferred from Pittsburgh. Under NCAA transfer rules, Ilegomah will have to sit out until December. Will have one and a half years of remaining eligibility.

=== 2019 recruiting class ===
College recruiting information
Name	Hometown	School	Height	Weight	Commit date
Marcus Henderson; PG	Charlotte, NC	United Faith Christian Academy	6 ft 2 in (1.88 m)	N/A	Oct 10, 2018
Marcus Henderson; PG	Recruit ratings: Scout: Rivals: (NR)				
Overall recruit ranking:
Note: In many cases, Scout, Rivals, 247Sports, On3, and ESPN may conflict in their listings of height and weight.; In these cases, the average was taken. ESPN grades are on a 100-point scale.; Sources: "2019 Team Ranking". Rivals.

== Preseason ==
Evansville was picked to finish eighth in the MVC in the preseason despite returning leading scorer K.K. Riley and incorporating three transfers who sat out the previous season.

== Season notes ==
=== Win over No. 1 Kentucky ===
On November 12, Evansville scored its first win over a No. 1-ranked team in program history when it upset Kentucky 67–64. Junior guard Sam Cunliffe hit a pair of free throws with 6.8 seconds to go to help secure the victory for the Purple Aces and finished with 17 points.

=== Coaching changes ===
The season saw Evansville go through several coaching changes. First, second-year head coach Walter McCarty was placed on administrative leave by the school on December 27, 2019, pending a Title IX investigation against him. Assistant coach Bennie Seltzer served as interim head coach of the Purple Aces during McCarty's initial absence. On January 21, 2020, Evansville fired McCarty following additional allegations of misconduct, and named former Butler and Iowa head coach Todd Lickliter (who had served as assistant coach under McCarty a season prior, before resigning due to health problems) as the new head coach.

== Roster ==
2019–20 Evansville Purple Aces men's basketball team
Players
Coaches

Pos.	#	Name	Height	Weight	Year	Previous school	Hometown
G	0	Gage Bobe	6 ft 0 in (1.83 m)	180 lb (82 kg)	Fr	South Knox	Vincennes, IN
G	1	Marcus Henderson	6 ft 2 in (1.88 m)	180 lb (82 kg)	Fr	United Faith Christian Academy	Charlotte, NC
G	2	Artur Labinowicz	6 ft 4 in (1.93 m)	190 lb (86 kg)	RS Jr	Combine Academy; Coastal Carolina	Charlotte, NC
G	3	Jawaun Newton	6 ft 3 in (1.91 m)	170 lb (77 kg)	So	Burges	El Paso, TX
G	4	Devan Straub (W)	6 ft 2 in (1.88 m)	190 lb (86 kg)	RS Jr	Mater Dei; IU Kokomo	Evansville, IN
G	5	Shamar Givance	5 ft 10 in (1.78 m)	155 lb (70 kg)	So	First Love Christian	Toronto, ON
F	10	Evan Kuhlman	6 ft 8 in (2.03 m)	220 lb (100 kg)	Jr	Lakota East	Liberty Township, OH
G	11	Thomasi Gilgeous-Alexander	6 ft 5 in (1.96 m)	200 lb (91 kg)	Fr	The Potter's House Christian	Hamilton, ON
F	13	DeAndre Williams	6 ft 9 in (2.06 m)	190 lb (86 kg)	RS Fr	Klein Forest	Houston, TX
G	20	Sam Cunliffe	6 ft 6 in (1.98 m)	200 lb (91 kg)	RS Jr	Rainier Beach; Kansas	Seattle, WA
G	30	Noah Frederking	6 ft 4 in (1.93 m)	210 lb (95 kg)	Jr	Okawville	Okawville, IL
G	33	K. J. Riley	6 ft 5 in (1.96 m)	180 lb (82 kg)	Sr	Standard of Excellence; Howard College	Bronx, NY
F	35	John Hall	6 ft 7 in (2.01 m)	215 lb (98 kg)	RS Jr	Standard of Excellence	Philadelphia, PA
F	42	Peace Ilegomah	6 ft 9 in (2.06 m)	240 lb (109 kg)	Jr	Montverde Academy; Pittsburgh	Benin City, Nigeria

Head coach

- Todd Lickliter (Butler)

Assistant coach(es)

- Bennie Seltzer (Washington State)
- Logan Baumann (Louisville)
- Terrence Commodore (Eastern Kentucky)

Legend

- (C) Team captain
- (S) Suspended
- (I) Ineligible
- (W) Walk-on
- Injured
- Current redshirt

Roster

== Schedule and results ==
Date time, TV	Rank^{#}	Opponent^{#}	Result	Record	Site (attendance) city, state
Exhibition
Oct 28, 2019*; 6:00 pm		Southern Indiana	W 71–68		Ford Center (6,263); Evansville, IN
Non-conference regular season
Nov 9, 2019*; 6:00 pm, ESPN3		at Ball State	W 79–75	1–0	Ford Center (5,372); Evansville, IN
Nov 12, 2019*; 6:00 pm, SECN		at No. 1 Kentucky	W 67–64	2–0	Rupp Arena (19,101); Lexington, KY
Nov 14, 2019*; 6:00 pm, ESPN3		IU–Kokomo	W 89–71	3–0	Ford Center (5,267); Evansville, IN
Nov 18, 2019*; 6:00 pm, ESPN+		SMU	L 57–59	3–1	Ford Center (5,639); Evansville, IN
Nov 22, 2019*; 7:00 pm		East Carolina; Islands of the Bahamas Showcase first round	L 68–85	3–2	Kendal Isaacs Gymnasium (300); Freeport, GB
Nov 23, 2019*; 2:00 pm		George Washington; Islands of the Bahamas Showcase consolation 2nd round	L 70–78	3–3	Kendal Isaacs Gymnasium (300); Freeport, GB
Nov 24, 2019*; 11:00		Morgan State; Islands of the Bahamas Showcase 7th place game	W 115–112 ^{3OT}	4–3	Kendal Isaacs Gymnasium (300); Freeport, GB
Nov 30, 2019*; 6:00 pm, ESPN+		at IUPUI	W 70–64	5–3	Indiana Farmers Coliseum (1,659); Indianapolis, IN
Dec 4, 2019*; 6:00 pm, ESPN3		Western Illinois	W 90–86	6–3	Ford Center (4,509); Evansville, IN
Dec 7, 2019*; 1:00 pm, ESPN3		Miami (OH)	W 101–87	7–3	Ford Center (5,264); Evansville, IN
Dec 14, 2019*; 6:00 pm, ESPN+		at Green Bay	W 72–62	8–3	Resch Center (1,924); Green Bay, WI
Dec 16, 2019*; 7:30 pm, ESPN+		at Jacksonville State	L 59–85	8–4	Pete Mathews Coliseum (2,155); Jacksonville, AL
Dec 21, 2019*; 6:00 pm, ESPN3		Murray State	W 78–76 ^{OT}	9–4	Ford Center (7,316); Evansville, IN
Missouri Valley Conference regular season
Dec 31, 2019; 4:00 pm, ESPN+		at Missouri State	L 52–65	9–5 (0–1)	JQH Arena (4,206); Springfield, MO
Jan 4, 2020; 6:00 pm, ESPN+		Valparaiso	L 79–81 ^{OT}	9–6 (0–2)	Ford Center (5,615); Evansville, IN
Jan 8, 2020; 6:00 pm, ESPN+		Bradley	L 52–72	9–7 (0–3)	Ford Center (4,489); Evansville, IN
Jan 11, 2020; 3:00 pm, ESPN+		at Loyola–Chicago	L 44–78	9–8 (0–4)	Joseph J. Gentile Arena (3,033); Chicago, IL
Jan 15, 2020; 6:00 pm, ESPN+		at Indiana State	L 42–65	9–9 (0–5)	Hulman Center (2,035); Terre Haute, IN
Jan 18, 2020; 1:00 pm, ESPN+		Missouri State	L 58–68	9–10 (0–6)	Ford Center (4,591); Evansville, IN
Jan 22, 2020; 6:00 pm, ESPN+		Drake	L 50–73	9–11 (0–7)	Ford Center (4,913); Evansville, IN
Jan 26, 2020; 4:00 pm, ESPN3		at Valparaiso	L 65–67	9–12 (0–8)	Athletics–Recreation Center (3,044); Valparaiso, IN
Jan 29, 2020; 7:00 pm, ESPN+		at Illinois State	L 66–77	9–13 (0–9)	Redbird Arena (4,022); Normal, IL
Feb 1, 2020; 1:00 pm, ESPN3		Northern Iowa	L 68–80	9–14 (0–10)	Ford Center (4,669); Evansville, IN
Feb 5, 2020; 6:00 pm, ESPN+		Southern Illinois	L 60–64 ^{OT}	9–15 (0–11)	Ford Center (4,691); Evansville, IN
Feb 9, 2020; 1:00 pm, CBSSN		at Bradley	L 58–69	9–16 (0–12)	Carver Arena (5,719); Peoria, IL
Feb 12, 2020; 6:00 pm, ESPN+		Loyola–Chicago	L 66–73	9–17 (0–13)	Ford Center (4,272); Evansville, IN
Feb 16, 2020; 3:00 pm, ESPN3		at Drake	L 80–85	9–18 (0–14)	Knapp Center (4,067); Des Moines, IA
Feb 20, 2020; 7:00 pm, ESPN+		at Southern Illinois	L 53–70	9–19 (0–15)	SIU Arena (5,466); Carbondale, IL
Feb 23, 2020; 1:00 pm, ESPN3		Indiana State	L 62–64	9–20 (0–16)	Ford Center (5,447); Evansville, IN
Feb 26, 2020; 7:00 pm, ESPN+		at Northern Iowa	L 64–84	9–21 (0–17)	McLeod Center (4,934); Cedar Falls, IA
Feb 29, 2020; 1:00 pm, ESPN3		Illinois State	L 60–71	9–22 (0–18)	Ford Center (4,983); Evansville, IN
MVC tournament
March 5, 2020; 8:30 pm, ESPN+	(10)	vs. (7) Valparaiso; First round	L 55–58	9–23	Enterprise Center (5,212); St. Louis, MO
*Non-conference game. ^{#}Rankings from AP Poll. (#) Tournament seedings in parentheses. All times are in Central Time.
