= 2019–20 Drake Bulldogs men's basketball team =

American college basketball season

2019–20 Drake Bulldogs men's basketball
- Conference: Missouri Valley Conference
- Record: 20–14 (8–10 MVC)
- Head coach: Darian DeVries (2nd season)
- Assistant coaches: Larry Blunt; Marty Richter; Matt Woodley
- Home arena: Knapp Center

2019–20 Missouri Valley Conference men's basketball standings
	Conf.				Overall
Team	W		L	PCT	W		L	PCT
Northern Iowa	14	–	4	.778	25	–	6	.806
Loyola Chicago	13	–	5	.722	21	–	11	.656
Indiana State	11	–	7	.611	18	–	12	.600
Bradley †	11	–	7	.611	23	–	11	.676
Southern Illinois	10	–	8	.556	16	–	16	.500
Missouri State	9	–	9	.500	16	–	17	.485
Valparaiso	9	–	9	.500	19	–	16	.543
Drake	8	–	10	.444	20	–	14	.588
Illinois State	5	–	13	.278	10	–	21	.323
Evansville	0	–	18	.000	9	–	23	.281
† 2020 MVC tournament winner

The 2019–20 Drake Bulldogs men's basketball team represented Drake University during the 2019–20 NCAA Division I men's basketball season. The Bulldogs were led by second-year head coach Darian DeVries. They played their home games at Knapp Center on campus in Des Moines, Iowa, as members of the Missouri Valley Conference (MVC). They finished the season 20–14, 8–10 in MVC play to finish in eighth place. They defeated Illinois State and Northern Iowa to advance to the semifinals of the MVC tournament where they lost to Bradley.

== Previous season ==
The Bulldogs finished the previous season 24–10 (12–6 MVC) to share of MVC regular season championship with Loyola–Chicago. The shared title was the Bulldogs' first since the 2007–08 season. After falling in the MVC tournament semifinals, they received a bid to the CollegeInsider.com Tournament where they lost in the first round to Southern Utah.

== Offseason ==
=== Departures ===
Name	Number	Pos.	Height	Weight	Year	Hometown	Reason for departure
Brady Ellingson	24	G	6'4"	193	RS Senior	Menomonee Falls, WI	Graduated.
Matt Gray	13	F	6'8"	224	Freshman	Orange, Australia	Transferred to Salt Lake Community College.
Nick McGlynn	35	F	6'8"	244	Senior	Stoughton, WI	Graduated.
Nick Norton	20	G	5'10"	166	RS Senior	Bloomington, IL	Graduated.
Luke Vaske	10	G	6'0"	182	Freshman	Norwalk, IA	Walk-on; didn't return.

=== Incoming transfers ===
Name	Number	Pos.	Height	Weight	Year	Hometown	Previous School
Brady Ernst	31	F	6'10"	230	Redshirt Senior	Clinton, IA	Transferred from Florida Gulf Coast. Was eligible to play immediately since he graduated from FGCU.
Jonah Jackson	20	G	6'3"	210	Junior	Merrillville, IN	Junior college transferred from John A. Logan College.

=== 2019 recruiting class ===
College recruiting information
Name	Hometown	School	Height	Weight	Commit date
Joseph Yesufu #49 PG	Bolingbrook, IL	Bolingbrook High School	5 ft 11 in (1.80 m)	215 lb (98 kg)	Aug 26, 2018
Joseph Yesufu #49 PG	Recruit ratings: Scout: Rivals: (76)				
Nate Ferguson; PF	Lemont, IL	Lemont High School	6 ft 7 in (2.01 m)	N/A	Aug 26, 2018
Nate Ferguson; PF	Recruit ratings: Scout: Rivals: (NR)				
Issa Samake; PF	Des Moines, Iowa	Grand View Christian School	6 ft 7 in (2.01 m)	200 lb (91 kg)	Jun 24, 2018
Issa Samake; PF	Recruit ratings: Scout: Rivals: (NR)				
Okay Djamgouz; G	Toronto, Canada	London Basketball Academy	6 ft 5 in (1.96 m)	170 lb (77 kg)	Apr 23, 2019
Okay Djamgouz; G	Recruit ratings: Scout: Rivals: (NR)				
Overall recruit ranking:
Note: In many cases, Scout, Rivals, 247Sports, On3, and ESPN may conflict in their listings of height and weight.; In these cases, the average was taken. ESPN grades are on a 100-point scale.; Sources: "2019 Team Ranking". Rivals.

== Roster ==
2019–20 Drake Bulldogs men's basketball team
Players
Coaches
} }

Pos.	#	Name	Height	Weight	Year	Previous school	Hometown
G	0	D. J. Wilkins	6 ft 2 in (1.88 m)	179 lb (81 kg)	RS So	Florida Southwestern State; Merrillville	Merrillville, IN
G	1	Samm Jones (W)	5 ft 11 in (1.8 m)	196 lb (89 kg)	RS Jr	Northwestern; De La Salle	Minneapolis, MN
F	2	Tremell Murphy	6 ft 6 in (1.98 m)	202 lb (92 kg)	Sr	Florida Southwestern State; Griffith	Griffith, IN
G	3	Garrett Sturtz (W)	6 ft 3 in (1.91 m)	175 lb (79 kg)	So	Newton	Newton, IA
G	4	Anthony Murphy	6 ft 5 in (1.96 m)	189 lb (86 kg)	Sr	Florida Southwestern State; Griffith	Griffith, IN
G	10	Okay Djamgouz	6 ft 5 in (1.96 m)	170 lb (77 kg)	Fr	London Basketball Academy	Toronto Canada
F	11	Antonio Pilipovic	6 ft 7 in (2.01 m)	208 lb (94 kg)	Sr	RheinStars Köln	Cologne, Germany
G	12	Roman Penn	5 ft 11 in (1.8 m)	180 lb (82 kg)	RS So	Siena; Bishop Noll	Calumet City, IL
F	13	Issa Samake	6 ft 7 in (2.01 m)	200 lb (91 kg)	Fr	Grand View Christian	Des Moines, IA
G	14	Noah Thomas	6 ft 2 in (1.88 m)	163 lb (74 kg)	Jr	22 Ft Academy	Sydney, Australia
G	20	Jonah Jackson	3 ft 0 in (0.91 m)	210 lb (95 kg)	Jr	John A. Logan College; Merrillville	Merrillville, IN
F	21	Liam Robbins	7 ft 0 in (2.13 m)	235 lb (107 kg)	So	Assumption	Davenport, IA
G/F	22	Andrew Barrett (W)	6 ft 5 in (1.96 m)	180 lb (82 kg)	So	Alleman	Rock Island, IL
G	23	Joseph Yesufu	6 ft 0 in (1.83 m)	215 lb (98 kg)	Fr	Bolingbrook	Bolingbrook, IL
F	24	Nate Ferguson	6 ft 7 in (2.01 m)	195 lb (88 kg)	Fr	Lemont	Lemont, IL
G	25	Connor Gholson (W)	6 ft 3 in (1.91 m)	182 lb (83 kg)	RS So	Newton	Newton, IA
F	31	Brady Ernst	6 ft 10 in (2.08 m)	244 lb (111 kg)	RS Sr	Florida Gulf Coast; Clinton	Clinton, IA

Head coach

- Darian DeVries (Northern Iowa)

Assistant coach(es)

- Larry Blunt (James Madison)
- Marty Richter (Simpson)
- Matt Woodley (Drake)

Legend

- (C) Team captain
- (S) Suspended
- (I) Ineligible
- (W) Walk-on
- Injured
- Current redshirt

Roster

== Schedule and results ==
Date time, TV	Rank^{#}	Opponent^{#}	Result	Record	Site (attendance) city, state
Exhibition
Nov 2, 2019*; 12:00 pm		Upper Iowa	W 95–88		Knapp Center (2,388); Des Moines, IA
Non-conference regular season
Nov 7, 2019*; 7:00 pm, ESPN+		Kennesaw State	W 86–55	1–0	Knapp Center (2,780); Des Moines, IA
Nov 11, 2019*; 6:00 pm, ESPN3		at Cincinnati	L 59–81	1–1	Fifth Third Arena (10,133); Cincinnati, OH
Nov 13, 2019*; 7:00 pm, MC22/ESPN+		Kansas City	W 76–58	2–1	Knapp Center (2,415); Des Moines, IA
Nov 17, 2019*; 3:00 pm, ESPN3		Simpson	W 98–53	3–1	Knapp Center (2,528); Des Moines, IA
Nov 21, 2019*; 7:00 pm, MC22/ESPN+		Lehigh	W 74–58	4–1	Knapp Center (2,333); Des Moines, IA
November 25, 2019*; 12:45 pm, FloSports		vs. Miami (Ohio); Gulf Coast Showcase First Round	L 59–67	4–2	Hertz Arena (563); Estero, FL
November 26, 2019*; 10:00 am, FloSports		vs. Northeastern; Gulf Coast Showcase Consolation 2nd Round	W 59–56	5–2	Hertz Arena (427); Estero, FL
November 27, 2019*; 12:30 pm, FloSports		vs. Murray State; Gulf Coast Showcase 5th Place Game	W 63–53	6–2	Hertz Arena (653); Estero, FL
Dec 3, 2019*; 7:00 pm, MC22/ESPN+		Milwaukee	W 56–53	7–2	Knapp Center (2,373); Des Moines, IA
Dec 7, 2019*; 5:00 pm, MC22/ESPN+		Southeast Missouri State	W 78–73	8–2	Knapp Center (2,723); Des Moines, IA
Dec 14, 2019*; 6:00 pm, ESPN+		at No. 14 Dayton	L 47–78	8–3	UD Arena (13,407); Dayton, OH
Dec 17, 2019*; 7:00 pm, ESPN+		Mount Marty	W 92–74	9–3	Knapp Center (2,468); Des Moines, IA
Dec 21, 2019*; 1:00 pm, MWN		at Air Force	W 85–80	10–3	Clune Arena (1,791); Colorado Springs, CO
MVC regular season
Dec 31, 2019; 6:00 pm, ESPN+		at Bradley	L 72–80	10–4 (0–1)	Carver Arena (5,416); Peoria, IL
Jan 4, 2020; 5:00 pm, MC22/ESPN+		Indiana State	W 80–76	11–4 (1–1)	Knapp Center (3,490); Des Moines, IA
Jan 7, 2020; 8:00 pm, CBSSN		Loyola–Chicago	W 65–62	12–4 (2–1)	Knapp Center (3,164); Des Moines, IA
Jan 11, 2020; 3:00 pm, ESPN3		at Valparaiso	L 61–66	12–5 (2–2)	Athletics–Recreation Center (3,190); Valparaiso, IN
Jan 16, 2020; 7:00 pm, MC22/ESPN+		Illinois State	W 84–74	13–5 (3–2)	Knapp Center (2,641); Des Moines, IA
Jan 19, 2020; 3:00 pm, ESPN3		at Southern Illinois	L 49–66	13–6 (3–3)	SIU Arena (4,337); Carbondale, IL
Jan 22, 2020; 6:00 pm, ESPN+		at Evansville	W 73–50	14–6 (4–3)	Ford Center (4,913); Evansville, IN
Jan 26, 2020; 7:00 pm, ESPN3		Missouri State	W 71–69	15–6 (5–3)	Knapp Center (3,593); Des Moines, IA
Jan 29, 2020; 6:00 pm, MC22/ESPN+		at Indiana State	L 56–58	15–7 (5–4)	Hulman Center (3,414); Terre Haute, IN
Feb 1, 2020; 5:00 pm, ESPN3		Southern Illinois	L 72–79	15–8 (5–5)	Knapp Center (4,053); Des Moines, IA
Feb 5, 2020; 8:00 pm, FSMIW/NBCS		Bradley	W 73–60	16–8 (6–5)	Knapp Center (3,328); Des Moines, IA
Feb 8, 2020; 3:00 pm, ESPN3		at Northern Iowa	L 73–83	16–9 (6–6)	McLeod Center (6,497); Cedar Falls, IA
Feb 12, 2020; 7:00 pm, ESPN+		at Missouri State	L 62–97	16–10 (6–7)	JQH Arena (3,185); Springfield, MO
Feb 16, 2020; 3:00 pm, ESPN3		Evansville	W 85–80	17–10 (7–7)	Knapp Center (4,067); Des Moines, IA
Feb 19, 2020; 7:00 pm, MC22/ESPN+		Valparaiso	W 77–75 ^{OT}	18–10 (8–7)	Knapp Center (3,783); Des Moines, IA
Feb 22, 2020; 3:30 pm, FSMW/NBCSC		at Illinois State	L 53–57	18–11 (8–8)	Redbird Arena (5,063); Normal, IL
Feb 25, 2020; 7:00 pm, NBCSC		at Loyola–Chicago	L 60–64	18–12 (8–9)	Gentile Arena (3,358); Chicago, IL
Feb 29, 2020; 5:00 pm, ESPN2		Northern Iowa	L 43–70	18–13 (8–10)	Knapp Center (7,152); Des Moines, IA
MVC tournament
March 5, 2020; 6:05 pm, FSMW/NBCSC	(8)	vs. (9) Illinois State; First round	W 75–65	19–13	Enterprise Center (5,212); St. Louis, MO
March 6, 2020; 12:05 pm, FSMW/NBCSC	(8)	vs. (1) Northern Iowa; Quarterfinals	W 77–56	20–13	Enterprise Center (7,399); St. Louis, MO
March 7, 2020; 2:35 pm, CBSSN	(8)	vs. (4) Bradley; Semifinals	L 66–76	20–14	Enterprise Center (8,145); St. Louis, MO
*Non-conference game. ^{#}Rankings from AP Poll. (#) Tournament seedings in parentheses. All times are in Central Time.
