= 2019–20 Northern Iowa Panthers men's basketball team =

American college basketball season

2019–20 Northern Iowa Panthers men's basketball

Missouri Valley regular-season champions
- Conference: Missouri Valley Conference
- Record: 25–6 (14–4 MVC)
- Head coach: Ben Jacobson (14th season)
- Assistant coaches: P. J. Hogan; Erik Crawford; Kyle Green
- Home arena: McLeod Center

2019–20 Missouri Valley Conference men's basketball standings
	Conf.				Overall
Team	W		L	PCT	W		L	PCT
Northern Iowa	14	–	4	.778	25	–	6	.806
Loyola Chicago	13	–	5	.722	21	–	11	.656
Indiana State	11	–	7	.611	18	–	12	.600
Bradley †	11	–	7	.611	23	–	11	.676
Southern Illinois	10	–	8	.556	16	–	16	.500
Missouri State	9	–	9	.500	16	–	17	.485
Valparaiso	9	–	9	.500	19	–	16	.543
Drake	8	–	10	.444	20	–	14	.588
Illinois State	5	–	13	.278	10	–	21	.323
Evansville	0	–	18	.000	9	–	23	.281
† 2020 MVC tournament winner

The 2019–20 Northern Iowa Panthers men's basketball team represented the University of Northern Iowa during the 2019–20 NCAA Division I men's basketball season. The Panthers, led by 14th-year head coach Ben Jacobson, played their home games at the McLeod Center in Cedar Falls, Iowa as members of the Missouri Valley Conference (MVC). They finished the season 25–6, 14–4 in MVC play, to win the MVC regular-season championship. They lost in the quarterfinals of the MVC tournament to Drake. As a regular-season conference champion who failed to win their conference tournament, they were set to receive an automatic bid to NIT. However, all postseason tournaments were cancelled amid the coronavirus pandemic.

== Previous season ==
The Panthers finished the 2018–19 season 16–18, 9–9 in MVC play, to finish in a three-way tie for fifth place. As the No. 6 seed in the MVC tournament, they beat Southern Illinois and Drake before losing to Bradley in the championship.

== Offseason ==
=== Departures ===
Name	Number	Pos.	Height	Weight	Year	Hometown	Reason for departure
Tray Croft	5	G	6' 1"	170	Junior	Anniston, AL	Transferred to Wisconsin–Parkside
Miles Wentzien	10	G	6' 3"	190	Senior	Fort Madison, IA	Walk-on; graduated
Wyatt Lohaus	22	G	6' 2"	192	RS Senior	North Liberty, IA	Graduated

=== 2019 recruiting class ===
College recruiting information
Name	Hometown	School	Height	Weight	Commit date
James Betz; PF	Garner, IA	Garner–Hayfield High School	6 ft 7 in (2.01 m)	210 lb (95 kg)	Aug 11, 2017
James Betz; PF	Recruit ratings: Scout: Rivals: (N/A)				
Cole Henry; SG	Oskaloosa, IA	Oskaloosa High School	6 ft 9 in (2.06 m)	210 lb (95 kg)	Aug 13, 2018
Cole Henry; SG	Recruit ratings: Scout: Rivals: (N/A)				
Noah Carter; PF	Dubuque, IA	Dubuque Senior High School	6 ft 4 in (1.93 m)	205 lb (93 kg)	Jun 27, 2018
Noah Carter; PF	Recruit ratings: Scout: Rivals: (N/A)				
Antwan Kimmons; PG	Saint Paul, MN	Tartan High School	6 ft 0 in (1.83 m)	185 lb (84 kg)	
Antwan Kimmons; PG	Recruit ratings: Scout: Rivals: (N/A)				
Overall recruit ranking:
Note: In many cases, Scout, Rivals, 247Sports, On3, and ESPN may conflict in their listings of height and weight.; In these cases, the average was taken. ESPN grades are on a 100-point scale.; Sources: "2019 Team Ranking". Rivals.

=== 2020 recruiting class ===
College recruiting information (2020)
Name	Hometown	School	Height	Weight	Commit date
Tytan Anderson; PG	Eldridge, IA	North Scott Senior High School	5 ft 10 in (1.78 m)	N/A	Aug 14, 2018
Tytan Anderson; PG	Recruit ratings: Scout: Rivals: (N/A)				
Overall recruit ranking:
Note: In many cases, Scout, Rivals, 247Sports, On3, and ESPN may conflict in their listings of height and weight.; In these cases, the average was taken. ESPN grades are on a 100-point scale.; Sources: "2020 Team Ranking". Rivals.

== Roster ==
2019–20 Northern Iowa Panthers men's basketball team
Players
Coaches

Pos.	#	Name	Height	Weight	Year	Previous school	Hometown
F	1	Cole Henry	6 ft 9 in (2.06 m)	215 lb (98 kg)	Fr	Oskaloosa	Oskaloosa, IA
G	3	Tywhon Pickford	6 ft 4 in (1.93 m)	202 lb (92 kg)	Jr	Maple Grove	Minneapolis, MN
G	4	A. J. Green	6 ft 4 in (1.93 m)	175 lb (79 kg)	So	Cedar Falls	Cedar Falls, IA
G	10	Logan Wolf (W)	6 ft 4 in (1.93 m)	220 lb (100 kg)	Fr	Cedar Falls	Cedar Falls, IA
G	11	Trae Berhow	6 ft 5 in (1.96 m)	195 lb (88 kg)	Jr	Watertown Mayer; Pepperdine	Watertown, MN
F	12	Lincoln Conrey	6 ft 5 in (1.96 m)	203 lb (92 kg)	RS Sr	Waterloo West	Waterloo, IA
G	13	Evan Gauger (W)	6 ft 2 in (1.88 m)	175 lb (79 kg)	Fr	Indianola	Indianola, IA
C	15	Justin Dahl	7 ft 0 in (2.13 m)	261 lb (118 kg)	RS Sr	Holy Family	Carver, MN
F	20	Shandon Goldman	6 ft 10 in (2.08 m)	220 lb (100 kg)	Sr	Lincoln; Chipola College	Evansville, AR
G	22	Antwan Kimmons	6 ft 0 in (1.83 m)	185 lb (84 kg)	Fr	Tartan	Oakdale, MN
F	23	Derek Krogmann (W)	6 ft 7 in (2.01 m)	230 lb (104 kg)	Fr	West Delaware	Manchester, IA
G	24	Isaiah Brown	6 ft 7 in (2.01 m)	180 lb (82 kg)	Sr	Flower Mound	Flower Mound, TX
G	30	Spencer Haldeman	6 ft 1 in (1.85 m)	175 lb (79 kg)	RS Sr	Western Dubuque	Peosta, IA
F	32	James Betz	6 ft 6 in (1.98 m)	215 lb (98 kg)	Fr	Garner–Hayfield–Ventura	Ventura, IA
F	34	Luke McDonnell	6 ft 9 in (2.06 m)	212 lb (96 kg)	RS Sr	Dubuque Senior	Dubuque, IA
F	35	Noah Carter	6 ft 6 in (1.98 m)	230 lb (104 kg)	Fr	Dubuque Senior	Dubuque, IA
F	50	Austin Phyfe	6 ft 9 in (2.06 m)	235 lb (107 kg)	Jr	Waverly-Shell Rock	Waverly, IA

Head coach

- Ben Jacobson (North Dakota)

Assistant coach(es)

- P. J. Hogan (Morningside)
- Erik Crawford (Iowa State)
- Kyle Green (Hamline)

Legend

- (C) Team captain
- (S) Suspended
- (I) Ineligible
- (W) Walk-on
- Injured
- Current redshirt

Roster
Last update: May 1, 2025

== Schedule and results ==
Date time, TV	Rank^{#}	Opponent^{#}	Result	Record	Site (attendance) city, state
Non-conference regular season
November 5, 2019*; 7:00 p.m., PSN/ESPN+		Old Dominion	W 58–53	1–0	McLeod Center (3,705); Cedar Falls, IA
November 9, 2019*; 3:00 p.m., ESPN3		at Northern Illinois	W 64–54	2–0	Convocation Center (1,003); DeKalb, IL
November 13, 2019*; 7:00 p.m., ESPN+		Cal State Bakersfield	W 67–55	3–0	McLeod Center (3,151); Cedar Falls, IA
November 16, 2019*; 12:00 p.m., ESPN3		Northern Colorado; Cancún Challenge campus-site game	W 77–72	4–0	McLeod Center (3,580); Cedar Falls, IA
November 19, 2019*; 7:00 p.m., PSN/ESPN+		UT Martin; Cancún Challenge campus-site game	W 87–67	5–0	McLeod Center (3,128); Cedar Falls, IA
November 20, 2019*; 7:00 p.m., ESPN+		Cornell (IA)	W 88–66	6–0	McLeod Center (3,171); Cedar Falls, IA
November 26, 2019*; 7:30 p.m., CBSSN		vs. West Virginia; Cancún Challenge Riviera semifinal	L 55–60	6–1	Hard Rock Hotel Riviera Maya (1,478); Cancún, Mexico
November 27, 2019*; 5:00 p.m., CBSSN		vs. South Carolina; Cancún Challenge Riviera Consolation	W 78–72	7–1	Hard Rock Hotel Riviera Maya (1,176); Cancún, Mexico
December 2, 2019*; 7:00 p.m., ESPN3		Luther College	W 110–51	8–1	McLeod Center (3,088); Cedar Falls, IA
December 10, 2019*; 8:00 p.m., P12N		at No. 24 Colorado	W 79–76	9–1	CU Events Center (6,570); Boulder, CO
December 12, 2019*; 8:00 p.m., ESPN3		at Grand Canyon	W 82–58	10–1	GCU Arena (7,186); Phoenix, AZ
December 22, 2019*; 1:00 p.m., ESPN+		Marshall	W 88–80	11–1	McLeod Center (4,648); Cedar Falls, IA
Missouri Valley Conference regular season
December 31, 2019; 2:00 p.m., ESPN+		at Illinois State	L 70–76	11–2 (0–1)	Redbird Arena (5,190); Normal, IL
January 4, 2020; 7:00 p.m., ESPNU		Bradley	W 69–64	12–2 (1–1)	McLeod Center (4,269); Cedar Falls, IA
January 7, 2020; 7:00 p.m., ESPN+		Indiana State	W 68–60	13–2 (2–1)	McLeod Center (3,697); Cedar Falls, IA
January 11, 2020; 3:00 p.m., FSNW/NBCSCHI/ESPN+		at Missouri State	W 80–57	14–2 (3–1)	JQH Arena (3,520); Springfield, MO
January 15, 2020; 7:00 p.m., PSN/ESPN+		Valparaiso	W 88–78	15–2 (4–1)	McLeod Center (4,057); Cedar Falls, IA
January 18, 2020; 5:00 p.m., ESPN2		at Bradley	W 86–71	16–2 (5–1)	Carver Arena (6,774); Peoria, IL
January 22, 2020; 8:00 p.m., FSNW/NBCSCHI/ESPN+		at Southern Illinois	L 66–68	16–3 (5–2)	SIU Arena (4,319); Carbondale, IL
January 26, 2020; 1:00 p.m., ESPNU		Loyola–Chicago	W 67–62 ^{OT}	17–3 (6–2)	McLeod Center (5,145); Cedar Falls, IA
January 29, 2020; 6:00 p.m., FSNW/NBCSCHI/ESPN+		Missouri State	W 95–66	18–3 (7–2)	McLeod Center (4,076); Cedar Falls, IA
February 1, 2020; 1:00 p.m., FSNW/NBCSCHI/ESPN3		at Evansville	W 80–68	19–3 (8–2)	Ford Center (4,669); Evansville, IN
February 5, 2020; 7:00 p.m., ESPN+		at Valparaiso	W 63–51	20–3 (9–2)	Athletics–Recreation Center (2,030); Valparaiso, IN
February 8, 2020; 3:00 p.m., FSNW/NBCSCHI		Drake	W 83–73	21–3 (10–2)	McLeod Center (6,497); Cedar Falls, IA
February 12, 2020; 7:00 p.m., PSN		Illinois State	W 71–63	22–3 (11–2)	McLeod Center (4,477); Cedar Falls, IA
February 15, 2020; 7:00 p.m., ESPN2		at Loyola–Chicago	L 73–82 ^{OT}	22–4 (11–3)	Joseph J. Gentile Arena (4,963); Chicago, IL
February 20, 2020; 6:00 p.m., ESPN+		at Indiana State	L 64–67	22–5 (11–4)	Hulman Center (3,765); Terre Haute, IN
February 23, 2020; 1:00 p.m., ESPNU		Southern Illinois	W 64–52	23–5 (12–4)	McLeod Center (6,497); Cedar Falls, IA
February 26, 2020; 7:00PM, PSN/ESPN+		Evansville	W 84–64	24–5 (13–4)	McLeod Center (4,934); Cedar Falls, IA
February 29, 2020; 5:00 p.m., ESPN2		at Drake	W 70–43	25–5 (14–4)	Knapp Center (7,152); Des Moines, IA
Missouri Valley tournament
March 6, 2020; 12:05 p.m., ESPN+	(1)	vs. (8) Drake; Quarterfinals	L 56–77	25–6	Enterprise Center (7,399); St. Louis, MO
*Non-conference game. ^{#}Rankings from AP poll. (#) Tournament seedings in parentheses. All times are in Central.
