= 2019–20 Loyola Ramblers men's basketball team =

American college basketball season

2019–20 Loyola Ramblers men's basketball
- Conference: Missouri Valley Conference
- Record: 21–11 (13–5 MVC)
- Head coach: Porter Moser (9th season)
- Assistant coaches: Jermaine Kimbrough; Matt Gordon; Drew Valentine
- Home arena: Joseph J. Gentile Arena

2019–20 Missouri Valley Conference men's basketball standings
	Conf.				Overall
Team	W		L	PCT	W		L	PCT
Northern Iowa	14	–	4	.778	25	–	6	.806
Loyola Chicago	13	–	5	.722	21	–	11	.656
Indiana State	11	–	7	.611	18	–	12	.600
Bradley †	11	–	7	.611	23	–	11	.676
Southern Illinois	10	–	8	.556	16	–	16	.500
Missouri State	9	–	9	.500	16	–	17	.485
Valparaiso	9	–	9	.500	19	–	16	.543
Drake	8	–	10	.444	20	–	14	.588
Illinois State	5	–	13	.278	10	–	21	.323
Evansville	0	–	18	.000	9	–	23	.281
† 2020 MVC tournament winner

The 2019–20 Loyola Ramblers men's basketball team represented Loyola University Chicago during the 2019–20 NCAA Division I men's basketball season. The Ramblers, led by eighth-year head coach Porter Moser, played their home games at the Joseph J. Gentile Arena in Chicago, Illinois as members of the Missouri Valley Conference (MVC). They finished the season 21–11, 13–5 in MVC play, to finish in second place. They lost in the quarterfinals of the MVC tournament to Valparaiso.

== Previous season ==
The Ramblers finished the 2018–19 season 20–14, 12–6 in MVC play, to earn a share of the MVC regular season championship. As the No. 1 seed in the MVC tournament, they beat Valparaiso before losing to Bradley in the semifinals. As a regular season conference champion who did not win their tournament championship, the Ramblers received an automatic bid to the National Invitation Tournament as the No. 7 seed in the TCU bracket. There they lost in the first round to Creighton.

Following the season, associate head coach Bryan Mullins was hired as the new head coach at alma mater Southern Illinois.

== Offseason ==
=== Departures ===
Name	Number	Pos.	Height	Weight	Year	Hometown	Reason for departure
Marques Townes	5	G	6'4"	208	Redshirt Senior	Edison, NJ	Graduated
Christian Negrón	12	F	6'7"	225	Sophomore	Elgin, IL	Transferred to Grand Valley State
Clayton Custer	13	G	6'1"	185	Redshirt Senior	Overland Park, KS	Graduated
Isaiah Bujdoso	22	G	6'3"	190	Freshman	Hamilton, ON	Transferred to McMaster
Dylan Boehm	31	F	6'5"	205	Sophomore	Los Angeles, CA	Walk-on; left the team

=== Incoming transfers ===
Name	Number	Pos.	Height	Weight	Year	Hometown	Previous school
Keith Clemons	5	G	6'1"	180	Junior	Norcross, GA	Transferred from Vincennes. Will play immediately since Clemons was a junior college transfer.
Braden Norris	14	G	6'0"	180	Sophomore	Hilliard, OH	Transferred from Oakland. Under NCAA transfer rules, Norris will have to sit out for the 2019–20 season. Will have three years of remaining eligibility.
Jalon Pipkins	50	G	6'4"	180	Junior	Paris, TX	Transferred from Paris JC. Will play immediately since Pipkins was a junior college transfer.

=== 2019 recruiting class ===
College recruiting information
Name	Hometown	School	Height	Weight	Commit date
Paxson Wojcik; SG	Charleston, SC	La Lumiere School (IN)	6 ft 4 in (1.93 m)	170 lb (77 kg)	Jun 24, 2018
Paxson Wojcik; SG	Recruit ratings: Rivals: 247Sports: ESPN: (N/R)				
Tom Welch; PF	Naperville, IL	Naperville North (IL)	6 ft 8 in (2.03 m)	200 lb (91 kg)	Aug 9, 2018
Tom Welch; PF	Recruit ratings: Rivals: 247Sports: ESPN: (NR)				
Marquise Kennedy; PG	Chicago, IL	Brother Rice (IL)	6 ft 1 in (1.85 m)	165 lb (75 kg)	Sep 17, 2018
Marquise Kennedy; PG	Recruit ratings: Rivals: 247Sports: ESPN: (N/R)				
Overall recruit ranking: 247Sports: 84
Note: In many cases, Scout, Rivals, 247Sports, On3, and ESPN may conflict in their listings of height and weight.; In these cases, the average was taken. ESPN grades are on a 100-point scale.; Sources: "2019 Loyola Ramblers Recruiting Class". ESPN.; "2019 Team Ranking". Rivals.

=== 2020 Recruiting class ===
College recruiting information (2020)
Name	Hometown	School	Height	Weight	Commit date
Jacob Hutson; C	Edina, MN	Edina (MN)	6 ft 10 in (2.08 m)	240 lb (110 kg)	Sep 27, 2018
Jacob Hutson; C	Recruit ratings: (N/R)				
Baylor Hebb; PG / SG	Colleyville, TX	Heritage (TX)	6 ft 2 in (1.88 m)	170 lb (77 kg)	Sep 9, 2019
Baylor Hebb; PG / SG	Recruit ratings: Rivals: 247Sports: ESPN: (N/R)				
Overall recruit ranking: 247Sports: 158
Note: In many cases, Scout, Rivals, 247Sports, On3, and ESPN may conflict in their listings of height and weight.; In these cases, the average was taken. ESPN grades are on a 100-point scale.; Sources: "2020 Loyola Ramblers Recruiting Class". ESPN.; "2020 Team Ranking". Rivals.

== Roster ==
2019–20 Loyola Ramblers men's basketball team
Players
Coaches

Pos.	#	Name	Height	Weight	Year	Previous school	Hometown
G	0	Paxson Wojcik	6 ft 4 in (1.93 m)	185 lb (84 kg)	Fr	La Lumiere	Charleston, SC
G	1	Lucas Williamson	6 ft 4 in (1.93 m)	205 lb (93 kg)	Jr	Whitney Young	Chicago, IL
G	2	Jake Baughman (W)	6 ft 3 in (1.91 m)	180 lb (82 kg)	Sr	Central Catholic	Bloomington, IL
G	4	Bruno Skokna	6 ft 4 in (1.93 m)	175 lb (79 kg)	Sr	KK Gorica	Zagreb, Croatia
G	5	Keith Clemons	6 ft 1 in (1.85 m)	180 lb (82 kg)	Jr	Wesley Christian; Vincennes	Norcross, GA
F	10	Tom Welch	6 ft 8 in (2.03 m)	220 lb (100 kg)	Fr	Naperville North	Naperville, IL
G	12	Marquise Kennedy	6 ft 1 in (1.85 m)	175 lb (79 kg)	Fr	Brother Rice	Chicago, IL
G	14	Braden Norris (redshirt)	6 ft 0 in (1.83 m)	180 lb (82 kg)	So	Hilliard Bradley; Oakland	Hilliard, OH
G	22	Sami Ismail (W)	6 ft 1 in (1.85 m)	182 lb (83 kg)	So	Carl Sandburg	Orland Park, IL
G	23	Cooper Kaifes	6 ft 3 in (1.91 m)	195 lb (88 kg)	So	Mill Valley	Shawnee, KS
G	24	Tate Hall	6 ft 6 in (1.98 m)	220 lb (100 kg)	RS Jr	Greenfield-Central; Indianapolis	Greenfield, IN
C	25	Cameron Krutwig	6 ft 9 in (2.06 m)	255 lb (116 kg)	Jr	Jacobs	Algonquin, IL
F	30	Aher Uguak	6 ft 7 in (2.01 m)	225 lb (102 kg)	RS Jr	Harry Ainlay; New Mexico	Edmonton, AB
F	33	Franklin Agunanne	6 ft 9 in (2.06 m)	245 lb (111 kg)	So	La Lumiere	Abuja, Nigeria
F	45	Will Alcock (W)	6 ft 7 in (2.01 m)	205 lb (93 kg)	So	Zionsville Community	Zionsville, IN
G	50	Jalon Pipkins	6 ft 4 in (1.93 m)	180 lb (82 kg)	Jr	Paris; Paris JC	Paris, TX

Head coach

- Porter Moser (Creighton)

Assistant coach(es)

- Jermaine Kimbrough (Virginia Tech)
- Matt Gordon (Illinois State)
- Drew Valentine (Oakland)

Legend

- (C) Team captain
- (S) Suspended
- (I) Ineligible
- (W) Walk-on
- Injured
- Current redshirt

Roster
Last update: August 13, 2024

== Schedule and results ==
Date time, TV	Rank^{#}	Opponent^{#}	Result	Record	Site (attendance) city, state
Exhibition
October 29, 2019*; 7:00 p.m.		Indianapolis	L 60–65	–	Joseph J. Gentile Arena (2,169); Chicago, IL
Non-conference regular season
November 5, 2019*; 7:00 p.m., ESPN3		UC Davis	W 82–48	1–0	Joseph J. Gentile Arena (3,244); Chicago, IL
November 8, 2019*; 6:00 p.m., ESPN3		at Furman	L 63–87	1–1	Timmons Arena (2,496); Greenville, SC
November 12, 2019*; 7:00 p.m., NBCSC+		Coppin State	L 72–76	1–2	Joseph J. Gentile Arena (2,491); Chicago, IL
November 16, 2019*; 1:00 p.m., NBCSC+		Saint Joseph's	W 85–68	2–2	Joseph J. Gentile Arena (2,921); Chicago, IL
November 20, 2019*; 7:00 p.m., NBCSC+		IUPUI	W 85–62	3–2	Joseph J. Gentile Arena (2,402); Chicago, IL
November 25, 2019*; 12:30 p.m., FloSports		vs. South Florida; Cayman Islands Classic quarterfinals	L 55–66	3–3	John Gray Gymnasium (1,214); George Town, Cayman Islands
November 26, 2019*; 10:00 a.m., FloSports		vs. Colorado State; Cayman Islands Classic consolation	L 60–61	3–4	John Gray Gymnasium (1,291); George Town, Cayman Islands
November 27, 2019*; 10:00 a.m., FloSports		vs. Old Dominion; Cayman Islands Classic seventh-place game	W 68–61	4–4	John Gray Gymnasium (1,235); George Town, Cayman Islands
December 3, 2019*; 6:00 p.m., ESPN+		at Ball State	W 70–58	5–4	Worthen Arena (4,128); Muncie, IN
December 7, 2019*; 1:00 p.m., ESPN3		Quincy	W 90–59	6–4	Joseph J. Gentile Arena (2,427); Chicago, IL
December 15, 2019*; 1:00 p.m., ESPN3		Norfolk State	W 64–45	7–4	Joseph J. Gentile Arena (2,428); Chicago, IL
December 18, 2019*; 5:30 p.m., CBSSN		vs. Vanderbilt; Basketball Hall of Fame Showcase	W 78–70	8–4	Talking Stick Resort Arena; Phoenix, AZ
December 22, 2019*; 2:00 p.m., NBCSC		Davidson	L 56–59	8–5	Joseph J. Gentile Arena (3,012); Chicago, IL
Missouri Valley regular season
December 30, 2019; 7:00 p.m., ESPN+		at Valparaiso	W 66–63	9–5 (1–0)	Athletics-Recreation Center (4,364); Valparaiso, IN
January 4, 2020; 7:00 p.m., ESPN+		Missouri State	W 62–58	10–5 (2–0)	Joseph J. Gentile Arena (2,795); Chicago, IL
January 7, 2020; 8:00 p.m., CBSSN		at Drake	L 62–65	10–6 (2–1)	Knapp Center (3,163); Des Moines, IA
January 11, 2020; 3:00 p.m., ESPN+		Evansville	W 78–44	11–6 (3–1)	Joseph J. Gentile Arena (3,033); Chicago, IL
January 16, 2020; 7:00 p.m., ESPN+		Southern Illinois	W 64–48	12–6 (4–1)	Joseph J. Gentile Arena (3,008); Chicago, IL
January 19, 2020; 3:00 p.m., ESPNU		at Illinois State	W 62–50	13–6 (5–1)	Redbird Arena (5,171); Normal, IL
January 22, 2020; 7:00 p.m., ESPN+		Indiana State	W 75–55	14–6 (6–1)	Joseph J. Gentile Arena (2,661); Chicago, IL
January 26, 2020; 3:00 p.m., ESPNU		at Northern Iowa	L 62–67 ^{OT}	14–7 (6–2)	McLeod Center (5,145); Cedar Falls, IA
January 29, 2020; 7:00 p.m., ESPN+		at Southern Illinois	L 63–68	14–8 (6–3)	Banterra Center (4,912); Carbondale, IL
February 1, 2020; 7:00 p.m., ESPN2		Bradley	W 62–51	15–8 (7–3)	Joseph J. Gentile Arena (4,963); Chicago, IL
February 5, 2020; 5:00 p.m., CBSSN		at Indiana State	L 39–68	15–9 (7–4)	Hulman Center (4,063); Terre Haute, IN
February 9, 2020; 3:00 p.m., ESPNU		Valparaiso	W 70–68	16–9 (8–4)	Joseph J. Gentile Arena (4,622); Chicago, IL
February 12, 2020; 6:00 p.m., ESPN+		at Evansville	W 73–66	17–9 (9–4)	Ford Center (4,272); Evansville, IN
February 15, 2020; 7:00 p.m., ESPN2		Northern Iowa	W 82–73 ^{OT}	18–9 (10–4)	Joseph J. Gentile Arena (4,963); Chicago, IL
February 19, 2020; 7:00 p.m., ESPN+		Illinois State	W 84–69	19–9 (11–4)	Joseph J. Gentile Arena (3,105); Chicago, IL
February 22, 2020; 2:30 p.m., CBSSN		at Missouri State	L 62–74	19–10 (11–5)	JQH Arena (4,251); Springfield, MO
February 25, 2020; 7:00 p.m., ESPN+		Drake	W 64–60	20–10 (12–5)	Joseph J. Gentile Arena (3,358); Chicago, IL
February 29, 2020; 6:00 p.m., ESPN3		at Bradley	W 67–66	21–10 (13–5)	Carver Arena (8,558); Peoria, IL
Missouri Valley tournament
March 6, 2020; 6:05 p.m., ESPN+	(2)	vs. (7) Valparaiso; Quarterfinals	L 73–74 ^{OT}	21–11	Enterprise Center (6,521); St. Louis, MO
*Non-conference game. ^{#}Rankings from AP poll. (#) Tournament seedings in parentheses. All times are in Central.
