= 2020 Missouri Valley Conference men's basketball tournament =

- Classification: Division I
- Season: 2019–20
- Teams: 10
- Site: Enterprise Center; St. Louis, Missouri
- Champions: Bradley (4th title)
- Winning coach: Brian Wardle (2nd title)
- MVP: Darrell Brown (Bradley)
- Television: CBS; CBSSN; MVC TV

2019–20 Missouri Valley Conference men's basketball standings
	Conf.				Overall
Team	W		L	PCT	W		L	PCT
Northern Iowa	14	–	4	.778	25	–	6	.806
Loyola Chicago	13	–	5	.722	21	–	11	.656
Indiana State	11	–	7	.611	18	–	12	.600
Bradley †	11	–	7	.611	23	–	11	.676
Southern Illinois	10	–	8	.556	16	–	16	.500
Missouri State	9	–	9	.500	16	–	17	.485
Valparaiso	9	–	9	.500	19	–	16	.543
Drake	8	–	10	.444	20	–	14	.588
Illinois State	5	–	13	.278	10	–	21	.323
Evansville	0	–	18	.000	9	–	23	.281
† 2020 MVC tournament winner

The 2020 Missouri Valley Conference men's basketball tournament, popularly referred to as "Arch Madness", was a postseason men's basketball tournament that completed the 2019–20 season in the Missouri Valley Conference. The tournament was held at the Enterprise Center in St. Louis, Missouri from March 5 to 8, 2020.

Bradley defeated Valparaiso in the championship game to win the tournament for the second consecutive year. Normally, Bradley would have received the MVC's automatic bid to the NCAA tournament, however the NCAA Tournament was canceled due to the COVID-19 pandemic.

== Seeds ==
Teams were seeded by conference record, with ties broken by the overall record in conference games played between the tied teams, then (if necessary) by NET Rating on the day following the conclusion of the regular season. The top six seeds received opening-round byes.

Seed	School	Conference	Tiebreaker 1	Tiebreaker 2
1	Northern Iowa	14–4		
2	Loyola–Chicago	13–5		
3	Indiana State	11–7	1–1 vs. Bradley	NET Rating of 100
4	Bradley	11–7	1–1 vs. Indiana State	NET Rating of 112
5	Southern Illinois	10–8		
6	Missouri State	9–9	1–1 vs Valparaiso	NET Rating of 122
7	Valparaiso	9–9	1–1 vs. Missouri State	NET Rating of 135
8	Drake	8–10		
9	Illinois State	5–13		
10	Evansville	0–18		

== Schedule ==
Game	Time *	Matchup	Score	Television
Opening Round – Thursday, March 5
1	6:05 pm	#8 Drake vs #9 Illinois State	75–65	MVC TV
2	8:35 pm	#7 Valparaiso vs. #10 Evansville	58–55	MVC TV
Quarterfinals – Friday, March 6
3	12:05 pm	#1 Northern Iowa vs. #8 Drake	56–77	MVC TV
4	2:35 pm	#4 Bradley vs. #5 Southern Illinois	64–59	MVC TV
5	6:05 pm	#2 Loyola–Chicago vs. #7 Valparaiso	73–74^{OT}	MVC TV
6	8:35 pm	#3 Indiana State vs. #6 Missouri State	51–78	MVC TV
Semifinals – Saturday, March 7
7	2:35 pm	#4 Bradley vs. #8 Drake	76–66	CBSSN
8	5:05 pm	#6 Missouri State vs. #7 Valparaiso	82–89	CBSSN
Final – Sunday, March 8
9	1:05 pm	#4 Bradley vs #7 Valparaiso	80–66	CBS
* Game times in CST through semifinals; CDT for championship; rankings denote tournament seed.

== Tournament bracket ==
Opening Round; Thursday, March 5 MVC TV
8	Drake	75
9	Illinois State	65
7	Valparaiso	58
10	Evansville	55

Quarterfinals; Friday, March 6 MVC TV
1	Northern Iowa	56
8	Drake	77
4	Bradley	64
5	Southern Illinois	59
2	Loyola–Chicago	73 ^{OT}
7	Valparaiso	74
3	Indiana State	51
6	Missouri State	78

Semifinals; Saturday, March 7 CBSSN
8	Drake	66
4	Bradley	76
7	Valparaiso	89
6	Missouri State	82

Final; Sunday, March 8 CBS
4	Bradley	80
7	Valparaiso	66
