= 2019–20 Southern Illinois Salukis men's basketball team =

American college basketball season

2019–20 Southern Illinois Salukis men's basketball
- Conference: Missouri Valley Conference
- Record: 16–16 (10–8 MVC)
- Head coach: Bryan Mullins (1st season)
- Assistant coaches: Brendan Mullins; Pat Monaghan; Jevon Mamon
- Home arena: Banterra Center

2019–20 Missouri Valley Conference men's basketball standings
	Conf.				Overall
Team	W		L	PCT	W		L	PCT
Northern Iowa	14	–	4	.778	25	–	6	.806
Loyola Chicago	13	–	5	.722	21	–	11	.656
Indiana State	11	–	7	.611	18	–	12	.600
Bradley †	11	–	7	.611	23	–	11	.676
Southern Illinois	10	–	8	.556	16	–	16	.500
Missouri State	9	–	9	.500	16	–	17	.485
Valparaiso	9	–	9	.500	19	–	16	.543
Drake	8	–	10	.444	20	–	14	.588
Illinois State	5	–	13	.278	10	–	21	.323
Evansville	0	–	18	.000	9	–	23	.281
† 2020 MVC tournament winner

The 2019–20 Southern Illinois Salukis men's basketball team represented Southern Illinois University Carbondale during the 2019–20 NCAA Division I men's basketball season. The Salukis were led by first-year head coach Bryan Mullins and played their home games at the Banterra Center (formerly SIU Arena) in Carbondale, Illinois as members of the Missouri Valley Conference. They finished the season 16–16, 10–8 in MVC play to finish in fifth place. They lost in the quarterfinals of the MVC tournament to Bradley.

== Previous season ==
The Salukis finished the 2018–19 season 17–15 overall, 10–8 in MVC play, finishing in a tie for third place. As the No. 3 seed in the MVC tournament, the Salukis were upset by No. 6 seed Northern Iowa in the quarterfinals.

In an emotional news conference following the game, Southern Illinois head coach Barry Hinson, announced he was stepping down as the coach of the Salukis. On March 20, 2019, the school hired former SIU star point guard and Loyola assistant coach Bryan Mullins as head coach.

== Roster ==
2019–20 Southern Illinois Salukis men's basketball team
Players
Coaches

Pos.	#	Name	Height	Weight	Year	Previous school	Hometown
G	0	Ben Harvey (I) (redshirt)	6 ft 5 in (1.96 m)	205 lb (93 kg)	RS So	Eastern Illinois; Link Year Prep	Jonesboro, AR
F	1	Marcus Domask	6 ft 6 in (1.98 m)	215 lb (98 kg)	Fr	Waupun High School	Waupun, WI
G	2	Kerrington Davis	6 ft 6 in (1.98 m)	210 lb (95 kg)	RS Fr	Nebraska; Montverde Academy	St. Louis, MO
G	3	Ronnie Suggs Jr.	6 ft 6 in (1.98 m)	205 lb (93 kg)	Sr	Missouri; Vermont Academy	Memphis, TN
G	4	Eric McGill	6 ft 2 in (1.88 m)	180 lb (82 kg)	RS Sr	Panola College; Bartlett	Memphis, TN
G	5	Lance Jones	6 ft 1 in (1.85 m)	200 lb (91 kg)	Fr	Evanston Township	Evanston, IL
G	10	Aaron Cook Jr.	6 ft 2 in (1.88 m)	185 lb (84 kg)	Sr	Westminster Christian	St. Louis, MO
F	12	Sekou Dembele	6 ft 7 in (2.01 m)	230 lb (104 kg)	RS Fr	Central Park Christian School	Bamako, Mali
F	21	Will Keller	6 ft 7 in (2.01 m)	230 lb (104 kg)	Jr	John A. Logan; Agape Christian	Marion, IL
G	22	Harwin Francois	6 ft 4 in (1.93 m)	190 lb (86 kg)	So	Daytona State; Cape Coral	{{{home}}}
G	24	Trent Brown	6 ft 2 in (1.88 m)	175 lb (79 kg)	Fr	Pinnacle High School	Scottsdale, AZ
G	25	Brendon Gooch	6 ft 5 in (1.96 m)	205 lb (93 kg)	Jr	Althoff	Belleville, IL
C	30	Stevan Jeremic	6 ft 11 in (2.11 m)	250 lb (113 kg)	Jr	Fifteenth Belgrade High School; Utah State University Eastern	Belgrade, Serbia
C	40	Barret Benson	6 ft 10 in (2.08 m)	240 lb (109 kg)	Sr	Hinsdale South; Northwestern	Willowbrook, IL

Head coach

- Bryan Mullins (Southern Illinois)

Assistant coach(es)

- Brendan Mullins (Saint Michael's)
- Pat Monaghan (Lewis)
- Jevon Marmon (Barat College)

Legend

- (C) Team captain
- (S) Suspended
- (I) Ineligible
- (W) Walk-on
- Injured
- Current redshirt

Roster

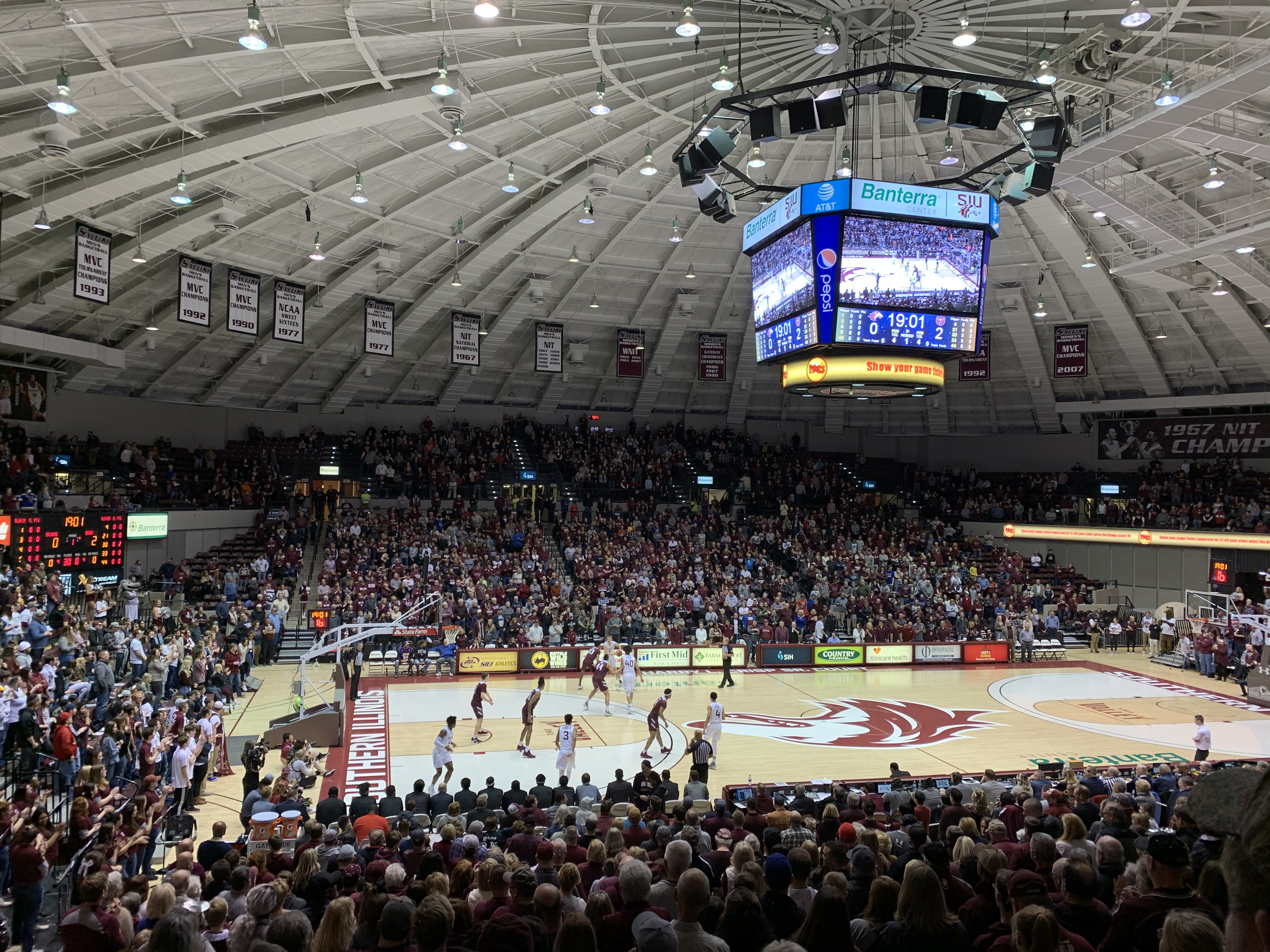
Salukis home game against the Missouri State Bears in 2020 at the Banterra Center

== Schedule and results ==
Date time, TV	Rank^{#}	Opponent^{#}	Result	Record	Site (attendance) city, state
Exhibition
Oct 22, 2019*; 7:00 pm		Minnesota State	W 56–41		Banterra Center (3,910); Carbondale, IL
Non-conference regular season
Nov 5, 2019*; 7:00 pm, ESPN3		Illinois Wesleyan	W 76–48	1–0	Banterra Center (4,049); Carbondale, IL
Nov 8, 2019*; 6:30 pm, FloHoops		vs. UTSA; Sunshine Slam	W 72–60	2–0	Silver Spurs Arena (556); Kissimmee, FL
Nov 9, 2019*; 2:00 pm, FloHoops		vs. Delaware; Sunshine Slam	L 54–56	2–1	Silver Spurs Arena (564); Kissimmee, FL
Nov 10, 2019*; 12:00 pm, FloHoops		vs. Oakland; Sunshine Slam	L 52–61	2–2	Silver Spurs Arena (539); Kissimmee, FL
Nov 16, 2019; 7:00 pm, ESPN3		San Francisco	L 60–76	2–3	Banterra Center (4,448); Carbondale, IL
Nov 19, 2019*; 7:00 pm, ESPN+		at Murray State	L 66–79	2–4	CFSB Center (4,549); Murray, KY
Nov 26, 2019*; 7:00 pm, ESPN+		North Carolina Central	W 64–48	3–4	Banterra Center (3,620); Carbondale, IL
Dec 1, 2019*; 3:00 pm, FSMW		at Saint Louis	L 60–69	3–5	Chaifetz Arena (6,122); St. Louis, MO
Dec 4, 2019*; 7:00 pm, ESPN+		Norfolk State	W 76–59	4–5	Banterra Center (3,761); Carbondale, IL
Dec 7, 2019*; 2:00 pm, CUSA.tv		at Southern Miss	L 69–72	4–6	Reed Green Coliseum (2,009); Hattiesburg, MS
Dec 15, 2019*; 3:00 pm, SECN		at Missouri	L 48–64	4–7	Mizzou Arena (8,216); Columbia, MO
Dec 18, 2019*; 7:00 pm, ESPN+		Hampton	W 75–53	5–7	Banterra Center (3,519); Carbondale, IL
Dec 21, 2019*; 3:00 pm, ESPN3		Southeast Missouri State	W 64–45	6–7	Banterra Center (4,293); Carbondale, IL
Missouri Valley regular season
Dec 30, 2019; 7:00 pm, FSMW		at Indiana State	L 56–68	6–8 (0–1)	Hulman Center (4,781); Terre Haute, IN
Jan 4, 2020; 3:00 pm, ESPN3		Illinois State	W 67–55	7–8 (1–1)	Banterra Center (4,580); Carbondale, IL
Jan 7, 2020; 7:00 pm, ESPN+		Valparaiso	W 63–50	8–8 (2–1)	Banterra Center (3,856); Carbondale, IL
Jan 11, 2020; 7:00 pm, ESPN+		at Bradley	L 48–67	8–9 (2–2)	Carver Arena (5,684); Peoria, IL
Jan 16, 2020; 7:00 pm, FSMW		at Loyola–Chicago	L 48–64	8–10 (2–3)	Joseph J. Gentile Arena (3,008); Chicago, IL
Jan 19, 2020; 3:00 pm, ESPN3		Drake	W 66–49	9–10 (3–3)	Banterra Center (4,337); Carbondale, IL
Jan 22, 2020; 8:00 pm, FSMW		Northern Iowa	W 68–66	10–10 (4–3)	Banterra Center (4,319); Carbondale, IL
Jan 25, 2020; 2:00 pm, ESPN3		at Illinois State	W 58–55	11–10 (5–3)	Redbird Arena (5,095); Normal, IL
Jan 29, 2020; 7:00 pm, ESPN+		Loyola–Chicago	W 68–63	12–10 (6–3)	Banterra Center (4,912); Carbondale, IL
Feb 1, 2020; 5:00 pm, ESPN3		at Drake	W 79-72	13-10 (7–3)	Knapp Center (4,030); Des Moines, IA
Feb 5, 2020; 6:00 pm, ESPN+		at Evansville	W 64–60 ^{OT}	14–10 (8–3)	Ford Center (4,691); Evansville, IN
Feb 8, 2020; 7:00 pm, ESPN3		Missouri State	W 68–66	15–10 (9–3)	Banterra Center (6,528); Carbondale, IL
Feb 12, 2020; 7:00 pm, ESPN+		at Valparaiso	L 38–55	15–11 (9–4)	The ARC (2,374); Valparaiso, IN
Feb 15, 2020; 1:00 pm, CBSSN		Bradley	L 67–69	15–12 (9–5)	Banterra Center (5,766); Carbondale, IL
Feb 20, 2020; 7:00 pm, ESPN+		Evansville	W 70–53	16–12 (10–5)	Banterra Center (5,466); Carbondale, IL
Feb 23, 2020; 1:00 pm, ESPNU		at Northern Iowa	L 52–64	16–13 (10–6)	McLeod Center (6,497); Cedar Falls, IA
Feb 26, 2020; 7:00 pm, ESPN+		Indiana State	L 68–77	16–14 (10–7)	Banterra Center (5,297); Carbondale, IL
Feb 29, 2020; 3:00 pm, ESPN3		at Missouri State	L 59–84	16–15 (10–8)	JQH Arena (3,887); Springfield, MO
Missouri Valley tournament
Mar 6, 2020; 2:35 pm, ESPN+	(5)	vs. (4) Bradley; Quarterfinals	L 59–64	16–16	Enterprise Center (7,399); St. Louis, MO
*Non-conference game. ^{#}Rankings from AP Poll. (#) Tournament seedings in parentheses. All times are in Central Time.
