= 2019–20 Valparaiso Crusaders men's basketball team =

American college basketball season

2019–20 Valparaiso Crusaders men's basketball
- Conference: Missouri Valley Conference
- Record: 19–16 (9–9 MVC)
- Head coach: Matt Lottich (4th season)
- Assistant coaches: Luke Gore; Rob Holloway; Matt Bowen
- Home arena: Athletics–Recreation Center

2019–20 Missouri Valley Conference men's basketball standings
	Conf.				Overall
Team	W		L	PCT	W		L	PCT
Northern Iowa	14	–	4	.778	25	–	6	.806
Loyola Chicago	13	–	5	.722	21	–	11	.656
Indiana State	11	–	7	.611	18	–	12	.600
Bradley †	11	–	7	.611	23	–	11	.676
Southern Illinois	10	–	8	.556	16	–	16	.500
Missouri State	9	–	9	.500	16	–	17	.485
Valparaiso	9	–	9	.500	19	–	16	.543
Drake	8	–	10	.444	20	–	14	.588
Illinois State	5	–	13	.278	10	–	21	.323
Evansville	0	–	18	.000	9	–	23	.281
† 2020 MVC tournament winner

The 2019–20 Valparaiso Crusaders men's basketball team represented Valparaiso University during the 2019–20 NCAA Division I men's basketball season. The Crusaders, led by fourth-year head coach Matt Lottich, played their home games at the Athletics–Recreation Center as third-year members of the Missouri Valley Conference. They finished the season 19–16, 9–9 in MVC play to finish in a tie for sixth place. As the No. 7 seed in the MVC tournament, they defeated Evansville, Loyola–Chicago, and Missouri State to advance to the championship game where they lost to Bradley.

== Previous season ==
The Crusaders finished the 2018–19 season 15–18, 7–11 in MVC play to finish in a tie for eighth place. As the No. 9 seed in the MVC tournament, they defeated Indiana State in the first round before losing to Loyola–Chicago in the quarterfinals.

== Offseason ==
=== Departures ===
Name	Number	Pos.	Height	Weight	Year	Hometown	Reason for departure
Micah Bradford	1	G	6'2"	190	Junior	Bradley, IL	Left program
Deion Lavender	2	G	6'3"	190	RS Senior	Alton, IL	Graduated
Bakari Evelyn	4	G	6'2"	180	RS Junior	Detroit, MI	Graduate transferred to Iowa
Markus Golder	5	G/F	6'6"	195	RS Junior	Portland, OR	Graduate transferred to Portland State
Langston Stalling	12	G	6'3"	210	Freshman	Gary, IN	Left team to concentrate on academics
Jaume Sorolla	14	C	7'0"	240	Junior	Tortosa, Spain	Graduate transferred to Cincinnati
Derrik Smits	21	C	7'1"	240	RS Junior	Zionsville, IN	Graduate transferred to Butler

In addition to the departing players, assistant coach Todd Townsend left the program after the 2018–19 season, citing family reasons. Matt Bowen, who had spent that season as the Crusaders' director of basketball operations, was promoted to a full assistant position.

== Roster ==
2019–20 Valparaiso Crusaders men's basketball team
Players
Coaches

Pos.	#	Name	Height	Weight	Year	Previous school	Hometown
G	0	Javon Freeman-Liberty	6 ft 3 in (1.91 m)	175 lb (79 kg)	So	Whitney Young HS	Chicago, IL
G	1	Sigurd Lorange	5 ft 11 in (1.8 m)	175 lb (79 kg)	Fr	Metis Videregaende Skole	Trondheim, Norway
G	2	Zion Morgan	6 ft 5 in (1.96 m)	195 lb (88 kg)	RS Jr	Kenwood; UNLV/Wabash Valley	Chicago, IL
F	3	Brock Pappas (W)	6 ft 4 in (1.93 m)	205 lb (93 kg)	So	Washington Township HS	Valparaiso, IN
G	4	Daniel Sackey	5 ft 9 in (1.75 m)	175 lb (79 kg)	So	Thornlea	Winnipeg, MB
G/F	5	Donovan Clay	6 ft 7 in (2.01 m)	205 lb (93 kg)	Fr	Alton HS	Alton, IL
G	10	Eron Gordon	6 ft 3 in (1.91 m)	205 lb (93 kg)	RS Jr	Cathedral HS; Seton Hall	Indianapolis, IN
C	11	Emil Freese-Vilien	6 ft 10 in (2.08 m)	230 lb (104 kg)	Fr	Falkonergardens Gymnasium	Copenhagen, Denmark
G	15	Luke Morrill (W)	6 ft 2 in (1.88 m)	195 lb (88 kg)	Fr	Montini Catholic HS	Lombard, IL
F	22	Mileek McMillan	6 ft 8 in (2.03 m)	230 lb (104 kg)	Jr	Merrillville HS	Merrillville, IN
F	23	Ben Krikke	6 ft 9 in (2.06 m)	220 lb (100 kg)	Fr	Jasper Place HS	Edmonton, AB
G	25	Nick Robinson	6 ft 5 in (1.96 m)	215 lb (98 kg)	RS Jr	Kenwood; Saint Joseph's	Chicago, IL
G/F	33	John Kiser	6 ft 5 in (1.96 m)	205 lb (93 kg)	Jr	Noblesville HS	Noblesville, IN
G/F	35	Ryan Fazekas	6 ft 7 in (2.01 m)	220 lb (100 kg)	RS Jr	Marquette Catholic HS; Providence	Chesterton, IN

Head coach

- Matt Lottich (Stanford)

Assistant coach(es)

- Luke Gore (Bethel (TN))
- Rob Holloway (Eastern Illinois)
- Matt Bowen (Indiana)

Legend

- (C) Team captain
- (S) Suspended
- (I) Ineligible
- (W) Walk-on
- Injured
- Current redshirt

Roster
Last update: September 23, 2019

== Schedule and results ==
Date time, TV	Rank^{#}	Opponent^{#}	Result	Record	Site (attendance) city, state
Canadian exhibition tour
August 10, 2019*		at McGill	W 84–78		Montreal, Quebec, Canada
August 11, 2019*		at Concordia	W 94–90		Montreal, Quebec, Canada
August 13, 2019*		at Carleton	W 83–80 ^{OT}		Ottawa, Ontario, Canada
August 14, 2019*		at Quebec	W 81–68		Montreal, Quebec, Canada
Exhibition
October 19, 2019*		Cedarville	W 85–65		ARC (1,637); Valparaiso, IN
Non-conference regular season
November 5, 2019*; 7:00 pm, ESPN3		Toledo	W 79–77	1–0	ARC (2,412); Valparaiso, IN
November 9, 2019*; 6:00 pm, ESPN+		at Saint Louis	L 71–80	1–1	Chaifetz Arena (6,159); St. Louis, MO
November 12, 2019*; 7:00 pm, ESPN+		at SIU Edwardsville	W 89–76	2–1	Vadalabene Center (778); Edwardsville, IL
November 17, 2019*; 1:30 pm, ESPN3		North Dakota	W 74–60	3–1	ARC (2,504); Valparaiso, IN
November 22, 2019*; 12:00 pm, FloSports		vs. Grand Canyon; Paradise Jam quarterfinal	W 78–74	4–1	Fitness Center; St. Thomas, VI
November 23 or 24, 2019*; 4:30 pm, FloSports		vs. Nevada; Paradise Jam semifinal	L 59–84	4–2	Fitness Center; St. Thomas, VI
November 25, 2019*; 4:45 pm, FloSports		vs. Cincinnati; Paradise Jam 3rd place game	L 77–81 ^{OT}	4–3	Fitness Center; St. Thomas, VI
November 27, 2019*; 7:00 pm, ESPN3		Trinity Christian	W 98–71	5–3	ARC (1,824); Valparaiso, IN
December 3, 2019*; 6:00 pm, ESPN+		at Eastern Michigan	L 79–85	5–4	Convocation Center (1,237); Ypsilanti, MI
December 8, 2019*; 1:00 pm, ESPN+		Central Michigan	W 77–55	6–4	ARC (2,880); Valparaiso, IN
December 16, 2019*; 6:00 pm		at Charlotte	L 57–67	6–5	Dale F. Halton Arena (2,740); Charlotte, NC
December 18, 2019*; 6:00 pm, ESPN+		at High Point	W 87–72	7–5	Millis Athletic Convocation Center (928); High Point, NC
December 21, 2019*; 7:00 pm, 15,630		vs. Arkansas	L 68–72	7–6	Simmons Bank Arena (15,630); North Little Rock, AR
MVC regular season
December 30, 2019; 7:00 pm, ESPN+		Loyola–Chicago	L 63–66	7–7 (0–1)	ARC (4,364); Valparaiso, IN
January 4, 2020; 6:00 pm, ESPN+		at Evansville	W 81–79 ^{OT}	8–7 (1–1)	Ford Center (5,615); Evansville, IN
January 7, 2020; 7:00 pm, ESPN+		at Southern Illinois	L 50–63	8–8 (1–2)	SIU Arena (3,856); Carbondale, IL
January 11, 2020; 3:00 pm, ESPN3		Drake	W 66–61	9–8 (2–2)	ARC (3,190); Valparaiso, IN
January 15, 2020; 7:00 pm, ESPN+		at Northern Iowa	L 78–88	9–9 (2–3)	McLeod Center (4,057); Cedar Falls, IA
January 18, 2020; 7:00 pm, ESPN+		Indiana State	W 86–77	10–9 (3–3)	ARC (2,805); Valparaiso, IN
January 23, 2020; 7:30 pm, CBSSN		at Missouri State	L 60–67	10–10 (3–4)	JQH Arena (4,536); Springfield, MO
January 26, 2020; 4:00 pm, ESPN3		Evansville	W 67–65	11–10 (4–4)	ARC (3,044); Valparaiso, IN
January 29, 2020; 6:00 pm, ESPN+		at Bradley	L 69–80	11–11 (4–5)	Carver Arena (5,038); Peoria, IL
February 1, 2020; 7:00 pm, ESPN3		Illinois State	W 80–70	12–11 (5–5)	ARC (3,220); Valparaiso, IN
February 5, 2020; 7:00 pm, ESPN+		Northern Iowa	L 51–63	12–12 (5–6)	ARC (2,030); Valparaiso, IN
February 9, 2020; 3:00 pm, ESPNU		at Loyola–Chicago	L 68–70	12–13 (5–7)	Joseph J. Gentile Arena (4,622); Chicago, IL
February 12, 2020; 7:00, ESPN+		Southern Illinois	W 55–38	13–13 (6–7)	ARC (2,374); Valparaiso, IN
February 15, 2020; 6:00 pm, ESPN3		at Illinois State	W 65–62	14–13 (7–7)	Redbird Arena (4,529); Normal, IL
February 19, 2020; 7:00 pm, ESPN+		at Drake	L 75–77 ^{OT}	14–14 (7–8)	Knapp Center (3,783); Des Moines, IA
February 22, 2020; 7:00 pm, ESPN+		Bradley	W 90–78	15–14 (8–8)	ARC (3,237); Valparaiso, IN
February 25, 2020; 7:00 pm, ESPN+		Missouri State	W 89–74	16–14 (9–8)	ARC (2,476); Valparaiso, IN
February 29, 2020; 6:00 pm, ESPN3		at Indiana State	L 58–71	16–15 (9–9)	Hulman Center (4,114); Terre Haute, IN
MVC tournament
March 5, 2020; 8:35 pm, ESPN+	(7)	vs. (10) Evansville; First round	W 58–55	17–15	Enterprise Center (5,212); St. Louis, MO
March 5, 2020; 6:05 pm, ESPN+	(7)	vs. (2) Loyola–Chicago; Quarterfinals	W 74–73 ^{OT}	18–15	Enterprise Center (6,521); St. Louis, MO
March 6, 2020; 5:05 pm, CBSSN	(7)	vs. (6) Missouri State; Semifinals	W 89–82	19–15	Enterprise Center (8,145); St. Louis, MO
March 8, 2020; 1:05 pm, CBS	(7)	vs. (4) Bradley; Championship	L 66–80	19–16	Enterprise Center (8,016); St. Louis, MO
*Non-conference game. ^{#}Rankings from AP Poll. (#) Tournament seedings in parentheses. All times are in Central Time.
