= Gaige Prim =

American basketball player (born 1999)

No. 44 – Ulsan Hyundai Mobis Phoebus
- Position: Power forward
- League: Korean Basketball League

Personal information
- Born: April 8, 1999 (age 27) Aurora, Colorado
- Listed height: 6 ft 8 in (2.03 m)
- Listed weight: 235 lb (107 kg)

Career information
- High school: Grandview (Aurora, Colorado)
- College: West Texas A&M (2017–2018); South Plains (2018–2019); Missouri State (2019–2022)
- Playing career: 2022–present

Career history
- 2022–present: Ulsan Hyundai Mobis Phoebus

Career highlights
- 2× First-team All-MVC (2021, 2022); Third-team All-MVC (2020); First-team NJCAA All-American (2019)

Gaige Colburn Prim (born April 8, 1999) is an American professional basketball player for Ulsan Hyundai Mobis Phoebus of the Korean Basketball League (KBL). He previously played for West Texas A&M Buffaloes, South Plains Texans, and Missouri State Bears basketball.

== High school career ==
Prim attended Grandview High School in Aurora, Colorado. As a junior, Prim averaged 14 points and eight rebounds per game. He was named to second team all-league and helped lead the team to the Colorado Sweet 16. Prim averaged 17 points, 10 rebounds and four blocks per game as a senior, shooting 70 percent from the field. He helped Grandview reach the Colorado Elite 8 and was a first-team all-league pick. Prim committed to playing college basketball for West Texas A&M.

== College career ==
Prim averaged 10.5 points and 6.8 rebounds per game as a freshman at West Texas A&M. For his sophomore season, Prim transferred to South Plains College. He helped the Texans achieve an automatic berth in the NJCAA tournament after contributing a 27 point, 14 rebound game during a 73–71 win against Odessa College in the Region V championship game. As a sophomore, Prim averaged 20.7 points and 11.5 rebounds per game. He was named a NJCAA First Team All-American. Prim was one of the top junior college recruits and committed to transfer to Missouri State, choosing the Bears over UT Arlington.

Prim was plagued by an undisclosed leg injury during his junior season but averaged 13.7 points and 4.9 rebounds per game. He earned Third Team All-Missouri Valley Conference honors. On February 26, 2021, Prim scored a career-high 33 points in a 90–81 win against Evansville. As a senior, Prim averaged 16.7 points and 9.1 rebounds per game and tallied eight double-doubles. He was named to the First Team All-MVC. Prim opted to return for a fifth season of eligibility, granted by the NCAA due to the COVID-19 pandemic. He repeated on the First Team All-MVC.

== Career statistics ==
Legend
GP	Games played	GS	Games started	MPG	Minutes per game
FG%	Field goal percentage	3P%	3-point field goal percentage	FT%	Free throw percentage
RPG	Rebounds per game	APG	Assists per game	SPG	Steals per game
BPG	Blocks per game	PPG	Points per game	**Bold**	Career high

=== College ===
==== NCAA Division I ====
Year	Team	GP	GS	MPG	FG%	3P%	FT%	RPG	APG	SPG	BPG	PPG
2019–20	Missouri State	**28**	15	21.7	.493	**.500**	**.785**	4.9	1.6	.6	.7	13.7
2020–21	Missouri State	24	**24**	**29.4**	**.599**	.000	.734	**9.1**	**3.0**	**1.2**	**1.3**	**16.7**
Career		52	39	25.2	.543	.250	.759	6.8	2.2	.9	1.0	15.1

==== NCAA Division II ====
Year	Team	GP	GS	MPG	FG%	3P%	FT%	RPG	APG	SPG	BPG	PPG
2017–18	West Texas A&M	36	8	18.0	.539	.000	.770	6.8	.6	.5	.8	10.5

==== JUCO ====
Year	Team	GP	GS	MPG	FG%	3P%	FT%	RPG	APG	SPG	BPG	PPG
2018–19	South Plains	34	34	26.1	.648	.438	.725	11.5	1.6	1.1	1.2	20.7
