= Grandview High School (Colorado) =

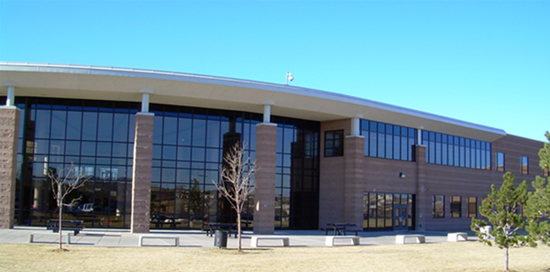

Location
- 20500 E. Arapahoe Rd. Aurora, Colorado 80016; United States; 39°35′33″N 104°44′49″W

Information
- Type: Public
- Motto: "One pack!"
- Established: 1998 (28 years ago)
- School district: Cherry Creek School District
- CEEB code: 060081
- Principal: Lisa Roberts
- Faculty: 135.65 (FTE)
- Grades: 9–12
- Enrollment: 2,684 (2024-2025)
- Student to teacher ratio: 19.79
- Colors: Royal blue, black, white
- Athletics: Class 5A
- Athletics conference: Centennial League
- Mascot: Wolf
- Newspaper: The Grandview Chronicle
- Website: grandview.cherrycreekschools.org

Grandview High School is the second-largest high school in the Cherry Creek School District in Colorado. Grandview opened in 1998 as the district's fifth high school, built to accommodate a population boom in the district's growing southeastern region. Grandview is located in Aurora, Colorado and uses the wolf as its mascot, sporting the colors of blue, black, and white.

== Academics ==
Like many other schools in the Cherry Creek School District, offers and has had success in their Advanced Placement Program, but Grandview does not have an IB program. Grandview also has a variety of Honors classes. The only AP courses offered to incoming freshmen are AP Human Geography and AP Computer Science, and an essay and teacher recommendation is required.

Students have the option to participate in a home-stay in China every four years. There is a Chinese Club and National Chinese Honor Society. Spanish has a variety of teachers to accommodate the large number of students who choose to study it. There is a Spanish Club and National Spanish Honor Society. French studies are also popular, with multiple teachers available. There is a French Club and National French Honor Society. Grandview also offers German language classes. There is a home-stay trip to Germany every other year. German students also do a home-stay with Grandview students in America. Classes are also offered in American Sign Language.

=== Advanced Placement ===
Grandview High School had the most students participating in AP courses in the state of Colorado for the 2014–2015 school year. 59% of the student body took AP exams that year and 88% of those students passed. Grandview's AP success has been recognized with five John Irwin School of Excellence Awards given to Grandview from 2004 to 2009.

== Athletics ==
Grandview offers most standard varsity sports, and has achieved notable success with its football, soccer, cheer, volleyball and cheerleading teams. Grandview's volleyball team has a notable record with state championships in 2004, 2005, 2007, 2013, and 2014. The program has held high success largely in part to Coach Patty Childress.

Grandview also shares Legacy Stadium with Cherokee Trail and Eaglecrest as its home field. The stadium retains artificial grass for its field that is used by several varsity sports such as soccer, football, and lacrosse.

In 2008, Sports Illustrated rated Grandview High School as having the best athletic program in the state of Colorado.

== Notable alumni ==
- Ryan Chapman (2002), rugby player
- Joe Klopfenstein (2002), NFL tight-end
- Ryan Walters (2004), defensive coordinator for the Washington Huskies
- Kevin Gausman (2010), MLB All-Star pitcher for the Toronto Blue Jays
- Mike Pennel (2010), defensive tackle for the Kansas City Chiefs
- Zac Portillos (2010), soccer player
- Greg Bird (2011), MLB first baseman
- Eddie Yarbrough (2011), NFL defensive end
- Evan Baylis (2012), NFL tight end
- Eric Garcia (2013), basketball player who plays in Mexico
- Tanner Gentry (2013), NFL wide receiver
- Andrew Kwon (2015), fashion designer
- Michaela Onyenwere (2017), basketball player for the Washington Mystics, 2021 WNBA Rookie of the Year
- Gaige Prim (2017), basketball player who plays in South Korea
- Natalie Beckman (2018), NWSL soccer player
- Lauren Betts (2022), professional basketball player for the Washington Mystics
- Sienna Betts (2025), basketball commit for the UCLA Bruins
