= Ryan Chapman (rugby union) =

US international rugby union player (born 1984)

- Born: July 4, 1984 (age 42)
- Height: 6 ft 5 in (196 cm)
- Weight: 240 lb (109 kg)

Rugby union career
- Position: Back-row
International career
Years	Team	Apps	(Points)
2011	United States	1	(0)

Ryan Chapman (born July 4, 1984) is an American former rugby union international.

Chapman was educated at Grandview High School in Aurora, Colorado.

A Colorado State Rams varsity rugby player, Chapman played as a defensive end for the new United Indoor Football franchise Colorado Ice in 2007, before returning to rugby union. He was a Utah Warriors back-row forward and made the United States training squad for the 2011 Rugby World Cup, making his only capped Eagles appearances in a World Cup warm-up match against Japan in Tokyo.

== See also ==
- List of United States national rugby union players
