= 2019–20 Saint Louis Billikens men's basketball team =

American college basketball season

2019–20 Saint Louis Billikens men's basketball
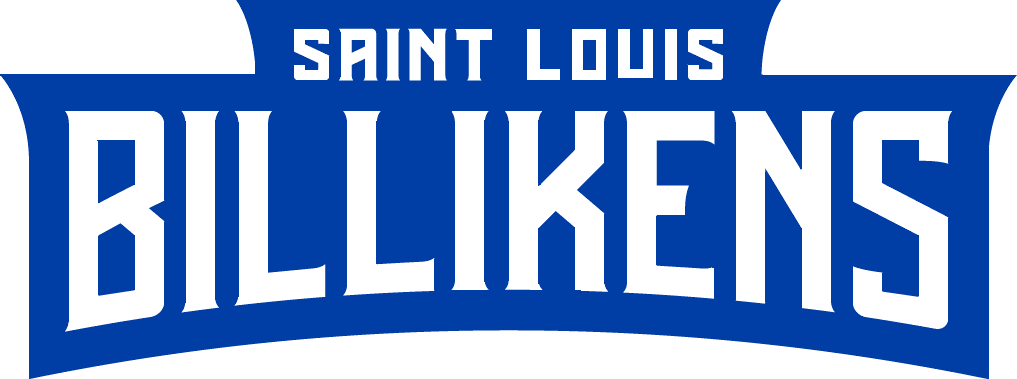

Gotham Classic champions
- Conference: Atlantic 10 Conference
- Record: 23–8 (12–6 A-10)
- Head coach: Travis Ford (4th season)
- Assistant coaches: Will Bailey; Ford Stuen; Corey Tate
- Home arena: Chaifetz Arena

2019–20 Atlantic 10 men's basketball standings
	Conf.				Overall
Team	W		L	PCT	W		L	PCT
No. 3 Dayton	18	–	0	1.000	29	–	2	.935
Richmond	14	–	4	.778	24	–	7	.774
Rhode Island	13	–	5	.722	21	–	9	.700
Saint Louis	12	–	6	.667	23	–	8	.742
St. Bonaventure	11	–	7	.611	19	–	12	.613
Duquesne	11	–	7	.611	21	–	9	.700
Davidson	10	–	8	.556	16	–	14	.533
Massachusetts	8	–	10	.444	14	–	17	.452
VCU	8	–	10	.444	18	–	13	.581
La Salle	6	–	12	.333	15	–	15	.500
George Washington	6	–	12	.333	12	–	20	.375
George Mason	5	–	13	.278	17	–	15	.531
Saint Joseph's	2	–	16	.111	6	–	26	.188
Fordham	2	–	16	.111	9	–	22	.290
Note: The 2020 A-10 tournament was canceled after the first round due to the COVID-19 pandemic. Rankings from AP poll

The 2019–20 Saint Louis Billikens men's basketball team represented Saint Louis University in the 2019–20 NCAA Division I men's basketball season. Their head coach was Travis Ford in his fourth season at Saint Louis. The team played their home games at Chaifetz Arena as a member of the Atlantic 10 Conference. They finished the season 23–8, 12–6 in A-10 play to finish in fourth place. Their season ended when the A-10 tournament and all other postseason tournaments were canceled due to the ongoing coronavirus pandemic.

== Previous season ==
The Billikens finished the 2018–19 season 23–13, 10–8 in A-10 play to finish in a tie for sixth place. As the No. 6 seed in the A-10 tournament, they defeated Richmond, Dayton, and Davidson to advance to the tournament championship game. There they defeated St. Bonaventure to win the tournament championship and received the conference's automatic bid to the NCAA tournament. As the No. 13 seed In the East, they lost in the first round to Virginia Tech.

== Offseason ==
=== Departures ===
Name	Number	Pos.	Height	Weight	Year	Hometown	Reason for departure
D. J. Foreman	1	F	6'8"	240	Senior	Spring Valley, NY	Graduated
Tramaine Isabell	2	G	6'1"	180	Senior	Seattle, WA	Graduated
Javon Bess	3	G	6'6"	220	Senior	Columbus, OH	Graduated
Dion Wiley	4	G	6'4"	210	Senior	Oxon Hill, MD	Graduated
Elliott Welmer	33	F	6'9"	220	Sophomore	Columbus, IN	Graduated

=== Incoming transfers ===
Name	Number	Pos.	Height	Weight	Year	Hometown	Previous School
Tay Weaver	0	G	5'10"	170	Senior	Louisville, KY	Transferred from Eastern Kentucky. Graduate Transfer, eligible immediately
Javonte Perkins	3	G/F	6'6"	195	Junior	St. Louis, MO	Transferred from Southwestern Illinois College. Junior College, eligible

=== 2019 recruiting class ===
College recruiting information
Name	Hometown	School	Height	Weight	Commit date
Terrence Hargrove Jr. SF	East St. Louis, IL	East St. Louis Senior High School	6 ft 7 in (2.01 m)	185 lb (84 kg)	Jul 1, 2018
Terrence Hargrove Jr. SF	Recruit ratings: Rivals: 247Sports: (81)				
Yuri Collins; PG	St. Louis, MO	St. Mary’s (MO)	5 ft 11 in (1.80 m)	175 lb (79 kg)	Sep 9, 2018
Yuri Collins; PG	Recruit ratings: Rivals: 247Sports: (n/a)				
Gibson Jimerson; SG	Richmond, VA	Montverde Academy (FL)	6 ft 6 in (1.98 m)	210 lb (95 kg)	Sep 29, 2018
Gibson Jimerson; SG	Recruit ratings: Rivals: 247Sports: (N/A)				
Jimmy Bell Jr. C	Saginaw, MI	Bella Vista Prep (AZ)	6 ft 11 in (2.11 m)	290 lb (130 kg)	Mar 3, 2019
Jimmy Bell Jr. C	Recruit ratings: Rivals: 247Sports: (79)				
Madani Diarra; C	Bamako, Mail	St. Benedict’s (NJ)	6 ft 10 in (2.08 m)	245 lb (111 kg)	May 12, 2019
Madani Diarra; C	Recruit ratings: Scout: Rivals: 247Sports: (N/A)				
Overall recruit ranking:
Note: In many cases, Scout, Rivals, 247Sports, On3, and ESPN may conflict in their listings of height and weight.; In these cases, the average was taken. ESPN grades are on a 100-point scale.; Sources:

== Roster ==
2019–20 Saint Louis Billikens men's basketball team
Players
Coaches

Pos.	#	Name	Height	Weight	Year	Previous school	Hometown
G	0	Jordan Goodwin	6 ft 3 in (1.91 m)	200 lb (91 kg)	Jr	Althoff Catholic	Centreville, Il
G	1	Yuri Collins	6 ft 0 in (1.83 m)	175 lb (79 kg)	Fr	St. Mary’s	St. Louis, MO
G	2	Tay Weaver	5 ft 10 in (1.78 m)	170 lb (77 kg)	GS	Doss; Eastern Kentucky	Louisville, KY
G/F	3	Javonte Perkins	6 ft 6 in (1.98 m)	195 lb (88 kg)	Jr	Miller Career Academy; Southwestern Illinois College	St. Louis, MO
G	10	Joshua Hightower (W)	6 ft 3 in (1.91 m)	175 lb (79 kg)	Jr	Glenelg Country; ASA College	Cooksville, MD
F	11	Hasahn French	6 ft 7 in (2.01 m)	245 lb (111 kg)	Jr	Commonwealth Academy	Middletown, NY
G	12	Brandon Courtney (W)	6 ft 3 in (1.91 m)	180 lb (82 kg)	So	Wesclin	Trenton, IL
G	15	Demarius Jacobs	6 ft 2 in (1.88 m)	185 lb (84 kg)	So	Uplift	Chicago, IL
G	20	Fred Thatch Jr. (injured) (redshirt)	6 ft 3 in (1.91 m)	215 lb (98 kg)	So	Sikeston	Sikeston, MO
C	21	Madani Diarra	6 ft 10 in (2.08 m)	240 lb (109 kg)	Fr	St. Benedict’s Prep	Bamako, Mail
F	22	Terrence Hargrove Jr.	6 ft 4 in (1.93 m)	195 lb (88 kg)	Fr	East St. Louis	East St. Louis, IL
F	23	KC Hankton	6 ft 7 in (2.01 m)	215 lb (98 kg)	So	United Faith Christian Academy	Charlotte, NC
G	24	Gibson Jimerson (injured) (redshirt)	6 ft 5 in (1.96 m)	200 lb (91 kg)	Fr	Montverde Academy	Richmond, VA
G	31	Jack Raboin	6 ft 6 in (1.98 m)	205 lb (93 kg)	RS Sr	Mattoon; Lake Land College	Mattoon, IL
F	32	Jimmy Bell Jr.	6 ft 10 in (2.08 m)	270 lb (122 kg)	Fr	Bella Vista Prep	Saginaw, MI

Head coach

- Travis Ford (Kentucky)

Assistant coach(es)

- Will Bailey (UAB)
- Ford Stuen (Oklahoma State)
- Corey Tate (Missouri)

Legend

- (C) Team captain
- (S) Suspended
- (I) Ineligible
- (W) Walk-on
- Injured
- Current redshirt

Roster

== Schedule and results ==
Date time, TV	Rank^{#}	Opponent^{#}	Result	Record	High points	High rebounds	High assists	Site (attendance) city, state
Exhibition
October 30, 2019*; 7:00 pm		Kentucky Wesleyan	W 77–48		19 – French	11 – Tied	6 – Goodwin	Chaifetz Arena; St. Louis, MO
Non-conference Regular season
November 5, 2019*; 7:00 pm, FSMW+		Florida Gulf Coast	W 89–67	1–0	20 – French	9 – Goodwin	9 – Collins	Chaifetz Arena (6,321); St. Louis, MO
November 9, 2019*; 6:00 pm, FSMW		Valparaiso	W 81–70	2–0	22 – Goodwin	9 – Goodwin	6 – Goodwin	Chaifetz Arena (6,159); St. Louis, MO
November 13, 2019*; 7:00 pm, FSMW		Eastern Washington; Gotham Classic	W 82–60	3–0	19 – French	7 – Tied	11 – Collins	Chaifetz Arena (5,023); St. Louis, MO
November 17, 2019*; 3:00 pm, ESPNU		No. 12 Seton Hall	L 66–83	3–1	14 – French	10 – French	5 – Collins	Chaifetz Arena (9,611); St. Louis, MO
November 20, 2019*; 7:00 pm, FSMW		High Point; Gotham Classic	W 67–55	4–1	25 – Jimerson	9 – French	7 – Collins	Chaifetz Arena (4,624); St. Louis, MO
November 23, 2019*; 4:00 pm, FSMW		Belmont; Gotham Classic	W 60–55	5–1	21 – French	24 – French	4 – Tied	Chaifetz Arena (6,236); St. Louis, MO
November 27, 2019*; 1:00 pm, ACCN		at Boston College; Gotham Classic	W 64–54	6–1	20 – Goodwin	14 – Goodwin	4 – Collins	Conte Forum (4,265); Chestnut Hill, MA
December 1, 2019*; 3:00 pm, FSMW		Southern Illinois	W 69–60	7–1	18 – Perkins	19 – Goodwin	4 – Tied	Chaifetz Arena (6,122); St. Louis, MO
December 8, 2019*; 12:30 pm, ESPN+		vs. Tulane; Jerry Colangelo Classic	W 86–62	8–1	22 – Jimerson	16 – Goodwin	6 – Collins	Talking Stick Resort Arena (1,050); Phoenix, AZ
December 14, 2019*; 3:00 pm, ESPN2		vs. No. 12 Auburn; Mike Slive Invitational	L 61–67	8–2	16 – Perkins	12 – Goodwin	4 – Collins	Legacy Arena (12,614); Birmingham, AL
December 17, 2019*; 7:00 pm, ESPN+		Maryville (MO)	W 82–69	9–2	27 – Hargrove	15 – Goodwin	7 – Collins	Chaifetz Arena (4,672); St. Louis, MO
December 21, 2019*; 6:00 pm, ESPN+		vs. Kansas State; Wildcat Classic	W 66–63	10–2	12 – Perkins	6 – Goodwin	6 – Collins	Sprint Center (11,625); Kansas City, MO
December 29, 2019*; 6:00 pm, FSMW		Bethune–Cookman	W 77–67	11–2	21 – Perkins	16 – Goodwin	5 – Tied	Chaifetz Arena (6,723); St. Louis, MO
A-10 Regular Season
January 2, 2020; 6:00 pm, ESPN+		at Duquesne	L 59–73	11–3 (0–1)	14 – Goodwin	12 – French	5 – French	UPMC Events Center (1,478); Moon, PA
January 5, 2020; 3:00 pm, NBCSN		Massachusetts	W 83–80 ^{OT}	12–3 (1–1)	19 – French	13 – French	9 – Collins	Chaifetz Arena (8,743); St. Louis, MO
January 8, 2020; 7:00 pm, FSMW		George Washington	W 63–58	13–3 (2–1)	20 – Goodwin	14 – French	3 – Collins	Chaifetz Arena (6,084); St. Louis, MO
January 11, 2020; 5:00 pm, FSMW+		at Richmond	W 74–58	14–3 (3–1)	26 – Goodwin	9 – Goodwin	7 – Collins	Robins Center (7,004); Richmond, VA
January 17, 2020; 6:00 pm, ESPN2		No. 13 Dayton	L 76–78 ^{OT}	14–4 (3–2)	25 – Perkins	17 – French	4 – Collins	Chaifetz Arena (10,007); St. Louis, MO
January 22, 2020; 6:00 pm, FSMW/Stadium		at Davidson	L 59–71	14–5 (3–3)	25 – Perkins	12 – Tied	6 – Collins	John M. Belk Arena (3,236); Davidson, NC
January 26, 2020; 2:00 pm, FSMW		Fordham	W 55–39	15–5 (4–3)	17 – Goodwin	13 – Tied	6 – Collins	Chaifetz Arena (6,842); St. Louis, MO
January 29, 2020; 7:00 pm, ESPN+		at La Salle	W 77–76 ^{OT}	16–5 (5–3)	15 – Perkins	16 – Goodwin	7 – Goodwin	Tom Gola Arena (1,311); Philadelphia, PA
February 1, 2020; 5:30 pm, NBCSN		at Saint Joseph's	W 78–73	17–5 (6–3)	33 – Perkins	13 – French	3 – French	Hagan Arena (2,161); Philadelphia, PA
February 5, 2020; 6:00 pm, FSMW		Duquesne	L 68–82	17–6 (6–4)	20 – Goodwin	12 – French	5 – Collins	Chaifetz Arena (5,205); St. Louis, MO
February 8, 2020; 1:00 pm, CBSSN		at No. 6 Dayton	L 65–71	17–7 (6–5)	22 – Goodwin	8 – Tied	3 – Goodwin	UD Arena (13,407); Dayton, OH
February 15, 2020; 1:30 pm, NBCSN		La Salle	W 84–69	18–7 (7–5)	24 – Perkins	11 – Goodwin	4 – Tied	Chaifetz Arena (7,862); St. Louis, MO
February 18, 2020; 6:00 pm, FSMW+		at Massachusetts	L 63–67	18–8 (7–6)	22 – Goodwin	14 – Goodwin	4 – Goodwin	Mullins Center (2,185); Amherst, MA
February 21, 2020; 8:00 pm, ESPN2		VCU	W 80–62	19–8 (8–6)	25 – Perkins	11 – Goodwin	12 – Collins	Chaifetz Arena (9,234); St. Louis, MO
February 26, 2020; 8:00 pm, CBSSN		Saint Joseph's	W 76–63	20–8 (9–6)	21 – Perkins	11 – Goodwin	7 – Collins	Chaifetz Arena (5,096); St. Louis, MO
March 1, 2020; 1:00 pm, ESPNU		at Rhode Island	W 72–62	21–8 (10–6)	17 – Tied	14 – French	10 – Collins	Ryan Center (7,004); Kingston, RI
March 4, 2020; 6:00 pm, ESPN+		at George Mason	W 69–57	22–8 (11–6)	25 – Perkins	8 – Goodwin	4 – Collins	EagleBank Arena (3,062); Fairfax, VA
March 7, 2020; 7:00 pm, FSMW/Stadium		St. Bonaventure	W 72–49	23–8 (12–6)	16 – French	18 – French	7 – Collins	Chaifetz Arena (9,274); St. Louis, MO
A-10 tournament
March 13, 2020; 2:30 pm, NBCSN		vs. TBD	A10 Tournament Canceled					Barclays Center; Brooklyn, NY
*Non-conference game. ^{#}Rankings from AP Poll. (#) Tournament seedings in parentheses. All times are in Central Time.
