= 2019–20 Atlantic 10 Conference men's basketball season =

- League: NCAA Division I
- Sport: Basketball
- Duration: November 2019 – March 2020
- Teams: 14
- TV partner(s): CBSSN, NBCSN, CBS

Regular season
- Regular season champions: Dayton
- Runners-up: Richmond
- Season MVP: Obi Toppin, Dayton

Tournament

Atlantic 10 men's basketball seasons
- ← 2018–19 2020–21 →

2019–20 Atlantic 10 men's basketball standings
	Conf.				Overall
Team	W		L	PCT	W		L	PCT
No. 3 Dayton	18	–	0	1.000	29	–	2	.935
Richmond	14	–	4	.778	24	–	7	.774
Rhode Island	13	–	5	.722	21	–	9	.700
Saint Louis	12	–	6	.667	23	–	8	.742
St. Bonaventure	11	–	7	.611	19	–	12	.613
Duquesne	11	–	7	.611	21	–	9	.700
Davidson	10	–	8	.556	16	–	14	.533
Massachusetts	8	–	10	.444	14	–	17	.452
VCU	8	–	10	.444	18	–	13	.581
La Salle	6	–	12	.333	15	–	15	.500
George Washington	6	–	12	.333	12	–	20	.375
George Mason	5	–	13	.278	17	–	15	.531
Saint Joseph's	2	–	16	.111	6	–	26	.188
Fordham	2	–	16	.111	9	–	22	.290
Note: The 2020 A-10 tournament was canceled after the first round due to the COVID-19 pandemic. Rankings from AP poll

The 2019–20 Atlantic 10 Conference men's basketball season was the 44th season of Atlantic 10 Conference basketball. The season began with practices in October 2019, followed by the start of the 2019–20 NCAA Division I men's basketball season in November. League play began in early January and ended in early March.

The 2020 Atlantic 10 tournament was to be held from March 11–15, 2020, at Barclays Center in Brooklyn, New York, but on March 12, the season was suspended due to the COVID-19 pandemic.

VCU is the defending regular-season champion, while Saint Louis is the defending Atlantic 10 Tournament champion.

Dayton won the regular season. Due to the COVID-19 pandemic, there was no Atlantic 10 Tournament champion.

== Head coaches ==
=== Coaching changes ===
On March 15, 2019, George Washington announced that Maurice Joseph would not return after three seasons as head coach of the Colonials. Six days later on March 21, George Washington announced that it had hired Siena head coach Jamion Christian to replace Joseph.

On March 19, 2019, Saint Joseph's announced that head coach Phil Martelli would not be retained following 24 seasons leading the Hawks. On March 28, Philadelphia 76ers assistant coach Billy Lange was named head coach.

=== Coaches ===
Team	Head coach	Previous job	Seasons at school	Overall record at school	A-10 record	A-10 championships	NCAA tournaments	NCAA Final Fours	NCAA Championships
Davidson	Bob McKillop	Long Island Lutheran High School	30	578–350 (.623)	59–31 (.656)	1	9	0	0
Dayton	Anthony Grant	Oklahoma City Thunder (asst.)	2	35–29 (.547)	21–15 (.583)	0	0	0	0
Duquesne	Keith Dambrot	Akron	2	35–30 (.538)	17–19 (.472)	0	0	0	0
Fordham	Jeff Neubauer	Eastern Kentucky	4	51–72 (.415)	22–46 (.324)	0	0	0	0
George Mason	Dave Paulsen	Bucknell	4	65–67 (.492)	34–38 (.472)	0	0	0	0
George Washington	Jamion Christian	Siena	0	0–0 (–)	0–0 (–)	0	0	0	0
La Salle	Ashley Howard	Villanova (asst.)	1	10–21 (.323)	8–10 (.444)	0	0	0	0
UMass	Matt McCall	Chattanooga	2	24–41 (.369)	9–27 (.250)	0	0	0	0
Rhode Island	David Cox	Rhode Island (asst.)	1	18–15 (.545)	9–9 (.500)	0	0	0	0
Richmond	Chris Mooney	Air Force	14	250–215 (.538)	125–110 (.532)	0	2	0	0
Saint Joseph's	Billy Lange	Philadelphia 76ers (asst.)	0	0–0 (–)	0–0 (–)	0	0	0	0
Saint Louis	Travis Ford	Oklahoma State	3	52–50 (.510)	25–29 (.463)	0	1	0	0
St. Bonaventure	Mark Schmidt	Robert Morris	12	210–168 (.556)	106–95 (.527)	1	2	0	0
VCU	Mike Rhoades	Rice	2	43–23 (.652)	25–11 (.694)	1	1	0	0

Notes:

- All records, appearances, titles, etc. are from time with current school only.
- Overall and A-10 records are from time at current school through the end of the 2018–19 season.

=== Conference matrix ===
This table summarizes the head-to-head results between teams in conference play. Each team will play 18 conference games: one game vs. eight opponents and two games against five opponents.

	Davidson	Dayton	Duquesne	Fordham	GM	GW	La Salle	UMass	Rhode Island	Richmond	St. Joseph's	Saint Louis	St. Bonaventure	VCU
vs. Davidson	–	1–0	1–0	0–2	0–1	1–0	0–1	0–1	1–1	2–0	1–1	0–1	0–1	1–1
vs. Dayton	0–1	–	0–2	0–1	0–1	0–1	0–1	0–2	0–2	0–1	0–1	0–2	0–1	0–2
vs. Duquesne	0–1	2–0	–	0–2	0–1	1–1	0–1	1–0	1–0	1–0	0–1	0–2	1–1	0–1
vs. Fordham	2–0	1–0	2–0	–	1–0	0–2	2–0	1–0	1–0	1–0	1–0	1–0	2–0	1–0
vs. George Mason	1–0	1–0	1–0	0–1	–	2–0	0–1	1–1	1–0	2–0	0–1	1–0	2–0	1–1
vs. George Washington	0–1	1–0	1–1	2–0	0–2	–	1–0	0–1	1–0	2–0	0–1	1–0	2–0	1–0
vs. La Salle	1–0	1–0	1–0	0–2	1–0	0–1	–	2–0	1–0	2–0	0–2	2–0	0–1	1–0
vs. UMass	1–0	2–0	0–1	0–1	1–1	1–0	0–2	–	2–0	1–0	0–1	1–1	1–0	0–1
vs. Rhode Island	1–1	2–0	0–1	0–1	0–1	0–1	0–1	0–2	–	1–0	0–2	1–0	0–1	0–2
vs. Richmond	0–2	1–0	0–1	0–1	0–2	0–2	0–2	0–1	0–1	–	0–1	1–0	1–0	1–1
vs. Saint Joseph's	1–1	1–0	1–0	0–1	1–0	1–0	2–0	1–0	2–0	1–0	–	2–0	2–0	1–0
vs. Saint Louis	1–0	2–0	2–0	0–1	0–1	0–1	0–2	1–1	0–1	0–1	0–2	–	0–1	0–1
vs. St. Bonaventure	1–0	1–0	1–1	0–2	0–2	0–2	1–0	0–1	1–0	0–1	0–2	1–0	–	1–0
vs. VCU	1–1	2–0	1–0	0–1	1–1	0–1	0–1	1–0	2–0	1–1	0–1	1–0	0–1	–
Total	10–8	18–0	11–7	2–16	5–13	6–12	6–12	8–10	13–5	14–4	2–16	12–6	11–7	8–10

== Preseason ==
=== Preseason poll ===
Prior to the season at the conference's annual media day, awards and a poll were chosen by a panel of the league's head coaches and select media members.

Rank	Team
1	VCU (19)
2	Davidson (8)
3	Dayton (1)
4	Rhode Island
5	St. Bonaventure
6	Richmond
7	Saint Louis
8	Duquesne
9	George Mason
10	La Salle
11	Massachusetts
12	George Washington
13	Saint Joseph's
14	Fordham
(first place votes)

=== Preseason all-conference teams ===
Award	Recipients
Preseason All-Atlantic 10 First Team	Kellan Grady, Davidson
Preseason All-Atlantic 10 First Team	Jón Axel Guðmundsson, Davidson
Preseason All-Atlantic 10 First Team	Obi Toppin, Dayton
Preseason All-Atlantic 10 First Team	Cyril Langevine, Rhode Island
Preseason All-Atlantic 10 First Team	Jacob Gilyard, Richmond
Preseason All-Atlantic 10 First Team	Marcus Evans, VCU
Preseason All-Atlantic 10 Second Team	Jalen Crutcher, Dayton
Preseason All-Atlantic 10 Second Team	Justin Kier, George Mason
Preseason All-Atlantic 10 Second Team	Jeff Dowtin, Rhode Island
Preseason All-Atlantic 10 Second Team	Grant Golden, Richmond
Preseason All-Atlantic 10 Second Team	Kyle Lofton, St. Bonaventure
Preseason All-Atlantic 10 Second Team	Hasahn French, Saint Louis
Preseason All-Atlantic 10 Third Team	Sincere Carry, Duquesne
Preseason All-Atlantic 10 Third Team	Fatts Russell, Rhode Island
Preseason All-Atlantic 10 Third Team	Osun Osunniyi, St. Bonaventure
Preseason All-Atlantic 10 Third Team	Jordan Goodwin, Saint Louis
Preseason All-Atlantic 10 Third Team	De'Riante Jenkins, VCU
Preseason All-Atlantic 10 Third Team	Marcus Santos-Silva, VCU
Preseason All-Atlantic 10 Defensive Team	Cyril Langevine, Rhode Island
Preseason All-Atlantic 10 Defensive Team	Jacob Gilyard, Richmond
Preseason All-Atlantic 10 Defensive Team	Osun Osunniyi, St. Bonaventure
Preseason All-Atlantic 10 Defensive Team	Hasahn French, Saint Louis
Preseason All-Atlantic 10 Defensive Team	Marcus Evans, VCU

== Regular season ==
=== Early season tournaments ===
Team	Tournament	Finish
Davidson	Orlando Invitational	6th
Dayton	Maui Invitational	2nd
Duquesne	Junkanoo Jam	1st
Fordham	Paradise Jam	6th
George Mason	Cayman Islands Classic	1st
George Washington	The Islands of the Bahamas Showcase	5th
La Salle	Gulf Coast Showcase	1st
Massachusetts	Hall of Fame Tip Off	4th
Rhode Island	Jamaica Classic	2nd
Richmond	Legends Classic	2nd
Saint Joseph's	Charleston Classic	8th
Saint Louis	Gotham Classic	1st
St. Bonaventure	Boca Beach Classic	1st
VCU	Emerald Coast Classic	4th

== Conference awards ==
On March 10, 2020, the Atlantic 10 announced its conference awards.

Award	Recipients
Coach of the Year	Anthony Grant, Dayton
Player of the Year	Obi Toppin, Dayton
Defensive Player of the Year	Jacob Gilyard, Richmond
Rookie of the Year	Tre Mitchell, Massachusetts
Chris Daniels Most Improved Player of the Year	AJ Wilson, George Mason
Sixth Man of the Year	Javonte Perkins, Saint Louis
First Team	Jalen Crutcher, Dayton Obi Toppin, Dayton Fatts Russell, Rhode Island Jacob Gilyard, Richmond Kyle Lofton, St. Bonaventure Jordan Goodwin, Saint Louis
Second Team	Kellan Grady, Davidson Marcus Weathers, Duquesne Tre Mitchell, Massachusetts Blake Francis, Richmond Grant Golden, Richmond Hasahn French, Saint Louis
Third Team	Jón Axel Guðmundsson, Davidson Trey Landers, Dayton Jeff Dowtin, Rhode Island Osun Osunniyi, St. Bonaventure Ryan Daly, Saint Joseph's Javonte Perkins, Saint Louis
All-Academic Team	Ryan Mikesell, Dayton Jeff Dowtin, Rhode Island Jaren Holmes, St. Bonaventure Toliver Freeman, Saint Joseph's Marcus Santos-Silva, VCU
All-Defensive Team	Fatts Russell, Rhode Island Jacob Gilyard, Richmond Osun Osunniyi, St. Bonaventure Hasahn French, Saint Louis Jordan Goodwin, Saint Louis
All-Rookie Team	Lee Hyun-jung, Davidson Jamison Battle, George Washington Tre Mitchell, Massachusetts Yuri Collins, Saint Louis Bones Hyland, VCU
