= 2019–20 George Washington Colonials men's basketball team =

American college basketball season

2019–20 George Washington Colonials men's basketball
- Conference: Atlantic 10 Conference
- Record: 12–20 (6–12 A-10)
- Head coach: Jamion Christian (1st season)
- Assistant coaches: Graham Bousley; Ryan Devlin; Nima Omidvar
- Home arena: Charles E. Smith Center

2019–20 Atlantic 10 men's basketball standings
	Conf.				Overall
Team	W		L	PCT	W		L	PCT
No. 3 Dayton	18	–	0	1.000	29	–	2	.935
Richmond	14	–	4	.778	24	–	7	.774
Rhode Island	13	–	5	.722	21	–	9	.700
Saint Louis	12	–	6	.667	23	–	8	.742
St. Bonaventure	11	–	7	.611	19	–	12	.613
Duquesne	11	–	7	.611	21	–	9	.700
Davidson	10	–	8	.556	16	–	14	.533
Massachusetts	8	–	10	.444	14	–	17	.452
VCU	8	–	10	.444	18	–	13	.581
La Salle	6	–	12	.333	15	–	15	.500
George Washington	6	–	12	.333	12	–	20	.375
George Mason	5	–	13	.278	17	–	15	.531
Saint Joseph's	2	–	16	.111	6	–	26	.188
Fordham	2	–	16	.111	9	–	22	.290
Note: The 2020 A-10 tournament was canceled after the first round due to the COVID-19 pandemic. Rankings from AP poll

The 2019–20 George Washington Colonials men's basketball team represented George Washington University during the 2019–20 NCAA Division I men's basketball season. The Colonials were led by first-year head coach Jamion Christian and played their home games at the Charles E. Smith Center in Washington, D.C. as members of the Atlantic 10 Conference (A-10).

George Washington finished the season with a 12–20 record and a 6–12 record in Atlantic 10 play. They were eliminated by Fordham in the opening round of the 2020 Atlantic 10 men's basketball tournament.

== Previous season ==
The Colonials finished the 2018–19 season 9–24, 4–14 in A-10 play, to finish in a tie for 12th place. As the No. 12 seed, they defeated Massachusetts in the first round of the A-10 tournament before losing to George Mason in the second round.

George Washington parted ways with Maurice Joseph on March 15, 2019, after three seasons and an overall record of 44–57. On March 21, the school hired Siena head coach Jamion Christian as the new head coach.

== Offseason ==
=== Departures ===
Name	Number	Pos.	Height	Weight	Year	Hometown	Reason for departure
Terry Nolan Jr.	1	G	6'2"	180	Sophomore	Essex, MD	Transferred to Bradley
Shandon Brown	12	G	5'10"	175	Freshman	Boston, MA	Transferred to Niagara
D. J. Williams	13	G	6'7"	215	RS Junior	Chicago, IL	Graduate transferred
Chris Sodom	33	C	7'3"	220	Sophomore	Kaduna, Nigeria	Left the team
Marcus Littles	35	F	6'9"	260	Freshman	Philadelphia, PA	Transferred to West Chester

=== Incoming transfers ===
Name	Number	Pos.	Height	Weight	Year	Hometown	Previous school
Ace Stallings	20	F	6'10"	230	Junior	Miami, FL	Transferred from Mount St. Mary's. Will be eligible to play immediately. Will join team as a walk-on.
Amir Harris	22	G	6'4"	205	Sophomore	Frederick, MD	Transferred from Nebraska. Under NCAA transfer rules, Harris will sit out the 2019–20 season. Will have three years of remaining eligibility.
Sloan Seymour	23	F	6'9"	205	Sophomore	Albany, NY	Transferred from Siena. Under NCAA transfer rules, Seymour will sit out the 2019–20 season. Will have three years of remaining eligibility.

=== 2019 recruiting class ===
College recruiting information
Name	Hometown	School	Height	Weight	Commit date
Chase Paar; PF	Glenelg, MD	Glenelg Country School	6 ft 9 in (2.06 m)	230 lb (100 kg)	Sep 5, 2018
Chase Paar; PF	Recruit ratings: 247Sports: ESPN: (NR)				
Jamison Battle; SF	Minneapolis, MN	De La Salle High School	6 ft 7 in (2.01 m)	N/A	Sep 10, 2018
Jamison Battle; SF	Recruit ratings: No ratings found				
Shawn Walker Jr. PG	Elizabeth City, NC	Bishop Sullivan Catholic High School	6 ft 5 in (1.96 m)	180 lb (82 kg)	Apr 3, 2019
Shawn Walker Jr. PG	Recruit ratings: No ratings found				
Jameer Nelson Jr. PG	Philadelphia, PA	The Haverford School	6 ft 0 in (1.83 m)	165 lb (75 kg)	Apr 6, 2019
Jameer Nelson Jr. PG	Recruit ratings: Rivals:				
Overall recruit ranking:
Note: In many cases, Scout, Rivals, 247Sports, On3, and ESPN may conflict in their listings of height and weight.; In these cases, the average was taken. ESPN grades are on a 100-point scale.; Sources: "George Washington 2019 Player Commits". ESPN.; "2019 Team Ranking". Rivals.

=== 2020 recruiting class ===
College recruiting information (2020)
Name	Hometown	School	Height	Weight	Commit date
Noel Brown; C	Herndon, VA	Flint Hill School	6 ft 11 in (2.11 m)	N/A	
Noel Brown; C	Recruit ratings: No ratings found				
Overall recruit ranking:
Note: In many cases, Scout, Rivals, 247Sports, On3, and ESPN may conflict in their listings of height and weight.; In these cases, the average was taken. ESPN grades are on a 100-point scale.; Sources: "George Washington 2020 Player Commits". ESPN.; "2020 Team Ranking". Rivals.

== Roster ==
2019–20 George Washington Colonials men's basketball team
Players
Coaches

Pos.	#	Name	Height	Weight	Year	Previous school	Hometown
G	1	Shawn Walker Jr.	6 ft 6 in (1.98 m)	185 lb (84 kg)	Fr	Bishop Sullivan Catholic (VA)	Elizabeth City, NC
G	2	Armel Potter	6 ft 1 in (1.85 m)	182 lb (83 kg)	RS Sr	Sprayberry High School; Charleston Southern	Marietta, GA
F	3	Chase Paar	6 ft 9 in (2.06 m)	220 lb (100 kg)	Fr	Glenelg Country School	Mount Airy, MD
G	4	Justin Williams	6 ft 3 in (1.91 m)	218 lb (99 kg)	Sr	Annapolis Area Christian School	Severn, MD
G	5	Adam Mitola (W)	6 ft 3 in (1.91 m)	192 lb (87 kg)	Sr	Gill St. Bernard's School	Florham Park, NJ
F	10	Jamison Battle	6 ft 7 in (2.01 m)	225 lb (102 kg)	Fr	DeLaSalle High School	Robbinsdale, MN
F	11	Arnaldo Toro	6 ft 9 in (2.06 m)	248 lb (112 kg)	Sr	St. Benedict's Prep	Hormigueros, Puerto Rico
G	12	Jameer Nelson Jr.	6 ft 1 in (1.85 m)	190 lb (86 kg)	Fr	Haverford School	Haverford, PA
G	14	Maceo Jack	6 ft 5 in (1.96 m)	190 lb (86 kg)	Jr	St. Thomas More School	Buffalo, NY
F	15	Mezie Offurum	6 ft 8 in (2.03 m)	220 lb (100 kg)	So	Georgetown Prep	Germantown, MD
F	20	Ace Stallings (W)	6 ft 10 in (2.08 m)	230 lb (104 kg)	Jr	Sidwell Friends School; Mount St. Mary's	Miami, FL
F	21	Luke Sasser (W)	6 ft 5 in (1.96 m)	205 lb (93 kg)	RS Sr	Carlisle School; Charlotte	Raleigh, NC
G	22	Amir Harris (redshirt)	6 ft 4 in (1.93 m)	205 lb (93 kg)	So	St. Maria Goretti High School; Nebraska	Frederick, MD
F	23	Sloan Seymour (redshirt)	6 ft 9 in (2.06 m)	205 lb (93 kg)	So	Shaker High School; Siena	Albany, NY
F	32	Javier Langarica	6 ft 9 in (2.06 m)	228 lb (103 kg)	Jr	Bilbao National High School	Bilbao, Spain
F	33	Miles Gally (W)	6 ft 10 in (2.08 m)	210 lb (95 kg)	Fr	Richard Montgomery High School	Rockville, MD

Head coach

- Jamion Christian (Mount St. Mary's)

Assistant coach(es)

- Graham Bousley (Wisconsin)
- Ryan Devlin (Pittsburgh)
- Nima Omidvar (Maryland)

Legend

- (C) Team captain
- (S) Suspended
- (I) Ineligible
- (W) Walk-on
- Injured
- Current redshirt

Roster
Last update: August 16, 2024

== Schedule and results ==
Date time, TV	Rank^{#}	Opponent^{#}	Result	Record	Site (attendance) city, state
Exhibition
November 1, 2019*; 7:00 p.m.		Hood College	W 83–55		Charles E. Smith Center (879); Washington, D.C.
Non-conference regular season
November 5, 2019*; 7:00 p.m., FloSports		at Towson; A10–CAA Challenge	L 58–72	0–1	SECU Arena (2,005); Towson, MD
November 9, 2019*; 4:00 p.m., ESPN+		Howard	W 76–62	1–1	Charles E. Smith Center (3,677); Washington, D.C.
November 12, 2019*; 7:00 p.m., ESPN+		American	L 65–67	1–2	Charles E. Smith Center (2,353); Washington, D.C.
November 16, 2019*; 1:00 p.m., ESPN+		Morgan State	L 64–68	1–3	Charles E. Smith Center (2,725); Washington, D.C.
November 22, 2019*; 5:00 p.m.		vs. Kansas City; The Islands of the Bahamas Showcase quarterfinals	L 68–74	1–4	Kendal Isaacs National Gymnasium (300); Nassau, Bahamas
November 23, 2019*; 2:00 p.m.		vs. Evansville; The Islands of the Bahamas Showcase consolation 2nd round	W 78–70	2–4	Kendal Isaacs National Gymnasium (300); Nassau, Bahamas
November 24, 2019*; 1:00 p.m.		vs. Milwaukee; The Islands of the Bahamas Showcase fifth-place game	W 66–63	3–4	Kendal Isaacs National Gymnasium (300); Nassau, Bahamas
December 1, 2019*; 2:00 p.m.		at South Carolina	L 65–74	3–5	Colonial Life Arena (9,843); Columbia, SC
December 4, 2019*; 7:00 p.m., ESPN+		Boston University	W 64–63	4–5	Charles E. Smith Center (1,731); Washington, D.C.
December 7, 2019*; 4:00 p.m., ESPN+		Delaware	W 66–56	5–5	Charles E. Smith Center (2,201); Washington, D.C.
December 21, 2019*; 12:00 p.m., ESPN+		Harvard	L 75–88	5–6	Charles E. Smith Center (2,209); Washington, D.C.
December 28, 2019*; 4:00 p.m., ESPN+		Longwood	W 78–65	6–6	Charles E. Smith Center (1,996); Washington, D.C.
December 31, 2019*; 2:00 p.m., ESPN+		at Vermont	L 51–76	6–7	Patrick Gym (3,228); Burlington, VT
Atlantic 10 regular season
January 5, 2020; 4:00 p.m., ESPN+		St. Bonaventure	L 66–71	6–8 (0–1)	Charles E. Smith Center (2,259); Washington, D.C.
January 8, 2020; 8:00 p.m., ESPN+		at Saint Louis	L 58–63	6–9 (0–2)	Chaifetz Arena (6,084); St. Louis, MO
January 11, 2020; 4:00 p.m., ESPN+		Duquesne	L 61–66	6–10 (0–3)	Charles E. Smith Center (2,302); Washington, D.C.
January 15, 2020; 7:00 p.m., ESPN+		George Mason; Revolutionary Rivalry	W 73–69	7–10 (1–3)	Charles E. Smith Center (3,089); Washington, D.C.
January 18, 2020; 4:30 p.m., NBCSN		at Massachusetts	W 75–51	8–10 (2–3)	Mullins Center (3,323); Amherst, MA
January 22, 2020; 7:00 p.m., ESPN+		at Fordham	L 54–59	8–11 (2–4)	Rose Hill Gymnasium (1,700); The Bronx, NY
January 25, 2020; 4:00 p.m., ESPN+		Saint Joseph's	W 85–69	9–11 (3–4)	Charles E. Smith Center (2,667); Washington, D.C.
January 29, 2020; 7:00 p.m., ESPN+		Davidson	W 107–104 ^{4OT}	10–11 (4–4)	Charles E. Smith Center (2,406); Washington, D.C.
February 1, 2020; 6:00 p.m., ESPN+		at Richmond	L 54–76	10–12 (4–5)	Robins Center (7,201); Richmond, VA
February 5, 2020; 4:00 p.m., Stadium		at St. Bonaventure	L 47–72	10–13 (4–6)	Reilly Center (4,354); St. Bonaventure, NY
February 8, 2020; 12:00 p.m., CBSSN		Rhode Island	L 51–82	10–14 (4–7)	Charles E. Smith Center (3,018); Washington, D.C.
February 15, 2020; 4:30 p.m., NBCSN		at George Mason; Revolutionary Rivalry	W 73–67	11–14 (5–7)	EagleBank Arena (6,015); Fairfax, VA
February 19, 2020; 8:00 p.m., ESPN+		at Duquesne	W 70–67	12–14 (6–7)	PPG Paints Arena (1,934); Pittsburgh, PA
February 22, 2020; 4:00 p.m., ESPN+		La Salle	L 62–72	12–15 (6–8)	Charles E. Smith Center (4,019); Washington, D.C.
February 26, 2020; 7:00 p.m., ESPN+		Richmond	L 70–73	12–16 (6–9)	Charles E. Smith Center (2,735); Washington, D.C.
February 29, 2020; 4:00 p.m., CBSSN		at VCU	L 51–75	12–17 (6–10)	Siegel Center (7,637); Richmond, VA
March 4, 2020; 7:00 p.m., ESPN+		Fordham	L 52–63	12–18 (6–11)	Charles E. Smith Center (2,554); Washington, D.C.
March 7, 2020; 7:00 p.m., ESPN+		at No. 3 Dayton; ESPN College GameDay	L 51–76	12–19 (6–12)	UD Arena (13,407); Dayton, OH
Atlantic 10 tournament
March 11, 2020; 3:30 p.m., ESPN+	(11)	vs. (14) Fordham; First round	L 52–72	12–20	Barclays Center (2,461); Brooklyn, NY
*Non-conference game. ^{#}Rankings from AP poll. (#) Tournament seedings in parentheses. All times are in Eastern.
