= 2019–20 Richmond Spiders men's basketball team =

2019–20 Richmond Spiders men's basketball

2019–20 Richmond Spiders men's basketball
- Conference: Atlantic 10 Conference
- Record: 24–7 (14–4 A-10)
- Head coach: Chris Mooney (15th season)
- Assistant coaches: Rob Jones; Marcus Jenkins; Steve Thomas
- Home arena: Robins Center

2019–20 Atlantic 10 men's basketball standings
	Conf.				Overall
Team	W		L	PCT	W		L	PCT
No. 3 Dayton	18	–	0	1.000	29	–	2	.935
Richmond	14	–	4	.778	24	–	7	.774
Rhode Island	13	–	5	.722	21	–	9	.700
Saint Louis	12	–	6	.667	23	–	8	.742
St. Bonaventure	11	–	7	.611	19	–	12	.613
Duquesne	11	–	7	.611	21	–	9	.700
Davidson	10	–	8	.556	16	–	14	.533
Massachusetts	8	–	10	.444	14	–	17	.452
VCU	8	–	10	.444	18	–	13	.581
La Salle	6	–	12	.333	15	–	15	.500
George Washington	6	–	12	.333	12	–	20	.375
George Mason	5	–	13	.278	17	–	15	.531
Saint Joseph's	2	–	16	.111	6	–	26	.188
Fordham	2	–	16	.111	9	–	22	.290
Note: The 2020 A-10 tournament was canceled after the first round due to the COVID-19 pandemic. Rankings from AP poll

The 2019–20 Richmond Spiders men's basketball team represented the University of Richmond during the 2019–20 NCAA Division I men's basketball season. They were led by 15th-year head coach Chris Mooney and played their home games at the Robins Center as members of the Atlantic 10 Conference. The Spiders finished the season 24–7, 14–4 in A-10 play to finish in second place. Their season ended when the A-10 tournament and all other postseason tournaments were canceled due to the ongoing coronavirus pandemic.

== Previous season ==
The Spiders finished the 2018–19 season 13–20, 6–12 in A-10 play to finish in a tie with Saint Joseph's for tenth place. As the No. 11 seed in the A-10 tournament, they defeated Fordham in the first round before losing to Saint Louis in the second round.

== Offseason ==
=== Departures ===
Name	Number	Pos.	Height	Weight	Year	Hometown	Reason for departure
Noah Yates	24	F	6'5"	210	Senior	Point Pleasant Beach, NJ	Exhausted eligibility as graduate student
Keith Oddo	30	G	6'1"	185	Senior	Roanoke, VA	Walk-on graduate transfer to Louisville
Julius Johnson	32	G	6'3"	200	Senior	Cocoa, FL	Graduated

Assistant coach Kim Lewis also left the team after six seasons in the position, joining the staff of Mercer University in the same role. Richmond's director of basketball operations Steve Thomas was promoted to fill the vacancy left by Lewis.

=== Incoming transfers ===
Name	Number	Pos.	Height	Weight	Year	Hometown	Previous School
Connor Crabtree	13	G	6'6"	190	Sophomore	Hillsborough, NC	Transferred from Tulane. Will sit out the 2019–20 season due to transfer rules and will have three years of remaining eligibility.

=== 2019 recruiting class ===
College recruiting information
Name	Hometown	School	Height	Weight	Commit date
Tyler Burton; SF	Uxbridge, MA	Marianapolis Prep	6 ft 7 in (2.01 m)	195 lb (88 kg)	Sep 16, 2018
Tyler Burton; SF	Recruit ratings: Scout: Rivals: 247Sports: (0)				
Overall recruit ranking:
Note: In many cases, Scout, Rivals, 247Sports, On3, and ESPN may conflict in their listings of height and weight.; In these cases, the average was taken. ESPN grades are on a 100-point scale.; Sources: "Rivals.com 2019 Richmond Commitments". Rivals.; "2018 Team Ranking". Rivals.

== Roster ==
2019–20 Richmond Spiders men's basketball team
Players
Coaches

Pos.	#	Name	Height	Weight	Year	Previous school	Hometown
G	0	Jacob Gilyard	5 ft 9 in (1.75 m)	160 lb (73 kg)	Jr	The Barstow School	Kansas City, Missouri
G	1	Blake Francis	6 ft 0 in (1.83 m)	175 lb (79 kg)	RS Jr	Westfield High School; Wagner	Herndon, Virginia
F	2	Souleymane Koureissi	6 ft 9 in (2.06 m)	215 lb (98 kg)	So	Iona Prep	Harlem, New York
F	3	Tyler Burton	6 ft 7 in (2.01 m)	195 lb (88 kg)	Fr	Marianapolis Prep	Uxbridge, Massachusetts
F	4	Nathan Cayo	6 ft 7 in (2.01 m)	225 lb (102 kg)	Jr	Collège Jean-de-Brébeuf	Montreal, Quebec
G	5	Nick Sherod	6 ft 4 in (1.93 m)	230 lb (104 kg)	RS Jr	St. Christopher's School	Richmond, Virginia
F	10	Sullivan Kulju (W)	6 ft 6 in (1.98 m)	220 lb (100 kg)	Jr	Eisenhower Middle/High School	New Berlin, Wisconsin
G	11	Jake Wojcik	6 ft 4 in (1.93 m)	190 lb (86 kg)	So	Bellarmine College Prep	San Jose, California
G	12	Gabe Arizin (W)	6 ft 4 in (1.93 m)	190 lb (86 kg)	Fr	St. Joseph's Prep	West Chester, Pennsylvania
G	13	Connor Crabtree (redshirt)	6 ft 6 in (1.98 m)	190 lb (86 kg)	So	Hargrave Military Academy; Tulane	Hillsborough, North Carolina
F	15	Matt Grace	6 ft 9 in (2.06 m)	230 lb (104 kg)	So	TRC Academy	Hamilton, Ontario
F	21	Tomas Verbinskis	6 ft 7 in (2.01 m)	210 lb (95 kg)	RS So	Sagemont School	Klaipeda, Lithuania
G	22	Andre Gustavson	6 ft 4 in (1.93 m)	195 lb (88 kg)	So	Helsinki Basketball Academy	Helsinki, Finland
G	31	Jordan Gaitley (W)	6 ft 4 in (1.93 m)	190 lb (86 kg)	Jr	Fordham Preparatory School	Haverford, Pennsylvania
F	33	Grant Golden	6 ft 10 in (2.08 m)	255 lb (116 kg)	RS Jr	St. James School	Winchester, Virginia

Head coach

- Chris Mooney (Princeton)

Assistant coach(es)

- Rob Jones (Toccoa Falls)
- Marcus Jenkins (Air Force)
- Steve Thomas (Rowan)

Legend

- (C) Team captain
- (S) Suspended
- (I) Ineligible
- (W) Walk-on
- Injured
- Current redshirt

Roster
Last update: October 31, 2019

== Schedule and results ==
Date time, TV	Rank^{#}	Opponent^{#}	Result	Record	High points	High rebounds	High assists	Site (attendance) city, state
Exhibition
Nov 3, 2019*; 6:00 p.m.		Randolph–Macon	W 70–57		17 – Golden	7 – Golden	6 – Golden	Robins Center; Richmond, VA
Non-conference regular season
Nov 8, 2019*; 7:00 p.m., ESPN+		Saint Francis (PA)	W 100–98 ^{OT}	1–0	27 – Sherod	8 – Tied	8 – Gilyard	Robins Center (6,602); Richmond, VA
Nov 14, 2019*; 7:00 p.m., NBCS WA/ESPN+		Vanderbilt	W 93–92 ^{OT}	2–0	26 – Gilyard	8 – Cayo	4 – Gilyard	Robins Center (5,602); Richmond, VA
Nov 17, 2019*; 4:00 p.m., MASN/ESPN+		Cal State Northridge; Legends Classic campus round	W 90–62	3–0	25 – Sherod	12 – Golden	7 – Gilyard	Robins Center (4,604); Richmond, VA
Nov 22, 2019*; 7:00 p.m., MASN/ESPN+		McNeese State; Legends Classic campus round	W 87–57	4–0	20 – Francis	6 – Tied	6 – Gilyard	Robins Center (4,765); Richmond, VA
Nov 25, 2019*; 7:00 p.m., ESPN2		vs. Wisconsin; Legends Classic semifinals	W 62–52	5–0	19 – Francis	12 – Golden	6 – Francis	Barclays Center (6,812); Brooklyn, NY
Nov 26, 2019*; 7:30 p.m., ESPN2		vs. No. 18 Auburn; Legends Classic final	L 65–79	5–1	14 – Golden	6 – Tied	4 – Gilyard	Barclays Center (6,420); Brooklyn, NY
Nov 30, 2019*; 2:30 p.m., NBCSN		Boston College	W 64–44	6–1	22 – Gilyard	8 – Gilyard	6 – Gilyard	Robins Center (5,531); Richmond, VA
Dec 3, 2019*; 7:00 p.m., ESPN+		at Hampton	W 80–63	7–1	29 – Francis	9 – Sherod	10 – Gilyard	Hampton Convocation Center (3,323); Hampton, VA
Dec 8, 2019*; 2:00 p.m., MASN/ESPN+		South Alabama	W 75–57	8–1	17 – Sherod	9 – Sherod	7 – Gilyard	Robins Center (5,506); Richmond, VA
Dec 14, 2019*; 5:00 p.m., NBCSN		Charleston	W 78–71	9–1	20 – Francis	7 – Tied	8 – Gilyard	Robins Center (5,804); Richmond, VA
Dec 18, 2019*; 7:00 p.m., ESPN+		at Old Dominion	W 62–59	10–1	19 – Golden	7 – Golden	4 – Tied	Ted Constant Convocation Center (6,219); Norfolk, VA
Dec 22, 2019*; 3:30 p.m.		vs. Radford; Holiday Hoops Fest	L 58–73	10–2	18 – Francis	7 – Golden	6 – Gilyard	Entertainment and Sports Arena (1,381); Washington, DC
Dec 29, 2019*; 6:30 p.m., SECN		at Alabama	L 78–90	10–3	21 – Gilyard	11 – Golden	4 – Gilyard	Coleman Coliseum (9,960); Tuscaloosa, AL
A-10 regular season
Jan 2, 2020; 7:00 p.m., NBCS WA/ESPN+		Saint Joseph's	W 84–52	11–3 (1–0)	23 – Francis	7 – Golden	4 – Golden	Robins Center (5,026); Richmond, VA
Jan 5, 2020 noon, ESPN+		at Rhode Island	W 69–61	12–3 (2–0)	19 – Cayo	11 – Cayo	5 – Golden	Ryan Center (5,325); Kingston, RI
Jan 11, 2020; 6:00 p.m., MASN/ESPN+		Saint Louis	L 58–74	12–4 (2–1)	17 – Sherod	6 – Cayo	3 – Golden	Robins Center (7,004); Richmond, VA
Jan 14, 2020; 7:00 p.m., ESPNU		at Davidson	W 70–64	13–4 (3–1)	18 – Sherod	6 – Tied	7 – Gilyard	John M. Belk Arena (3,503); Davidson, NC
Jan 18, 2020; 2:30 p.m., NBCSN		at George Mason	W 97–87	14–1 (4–1)	25 – Golden	6 – Burton	8 – Gilyard	EagleBank Arena (4,603); Fairfax, VA
Jan 22, 2020; 7:00 p.m., MASN/ESPN+		La Salle	W 75–57	15–4 (5–1)	15 – Golden	9 – Burton	5 – Gilyard	Robins Center (5,073); Richmond, VA
Jan 25, 2020; 6:00 p.m., NBCS WA/ESPN+		No. 7 Dayton	L 79–87	15–5 (5–2)	29 – Gilyard	9 – Sherod	7 – Golden	Robins Center (7,201); Richmond, VA
Jan 28, 2020; 7:00 p.m., CBSSN		at VCU; Capital City Classic	L 68–87	15–6 (5–3)	24 – Golden	8 – Golden	5 – Gilyard	Siegel Center (7,637); Richmond, VA
Feb 1, 2020; 6:00 p.m., NBCS WA+/ESPN+		George Washington	W 76–54	16–6 (6–3)	20 – Golden	6 – Wojcik	9 – Gilyard	Robins Center (7,201); Richmond, VA
Feb 8, 2020; 2:00 p.m., ESPN+		at Fordham	W 59–53	17–6 (7–3)	22 – Gilyard	9 – Burton	3 – Tied	Rose Hill Gymnasium (2,117); Bronx, NY
Feb 12, 2020; 7:00 p.m., ESPN+		at La Salle	W 74–47	18–6 (8–3)	16 – Golden	7 – Burton	5 – Gilyard	Tom Gola Arena (1,271); Philadelphia, PA
Feb 15, 2020; 4:00 p.m., CBSSN		VCU; Capital City Classic	W 77–59	19–6 (9–3)	23 – Sherod	10 – Golden	6 – Tied	Robins Center (7,201); Richmond, VA
Feb 19, 2020; 7:00 p.m., NBCS WA+/ESPN+		George Mason	W 65–50	20–6 (10–3)	21 – Golden	7 – Tied	3 – Tied	Robins Center (5,651); Richmond, VA
Feb 22, 2020; 6:30 p.m., NBCSN		at St. Bonaventure	L 71–75	20–7 (10–4)	23 – Francis	9 – Burton	6 – Gilyard	Reilly Center (5,480); St. Bonaventure, NY
Feb 26, 2020; 7:00 p.m., ESPN+		at George Washington	W 73–70	21–7 (11–4)	19 – Francis	9 – Cayo	8 – Golden	Charles E. Smith Center (2,735); Washington, D.C.
Feb 29, 2020; 6:00 p.m., NBCS WA/ESPN+		Massachusetts	W 95–71	22–7 (12–4)	20 – Francis	9 – Golden	10 – Gilyard	Robins Center (7,201); Richmond, VA
Mar 3, 2020; 7:00 p.m., NBCS WA+/ESPN+		Davidson	W 80–63	23–7 (13–4)	19 – Sherod	8 – Cayo	8 – Gilyard	Robins Center (6,501); Richmond, VA
Mar 6, 2020; 7:00 p.m., ESPN+		at Duquesne	W 73–62	24–7 (14–4)	21 – Francis	11 – Tied	10 – Gilyard	PPG Paints Arena (3,211); Pittsburgh, PA
A-10 tournament
Mar 13, 2020; 6:00 p.m., NBCSN	(2)	vs. TBD; Quarterfinals	A10 Tournament Canceled					Barclays Center; Brooklyn, NY
*Non-conference game. ^{#}Rankings from AP Poll. (#) Tournament seedings in parentheses. All times are in Eastern Time.
