= Obi Toppin =

American basketball player (born 1998)

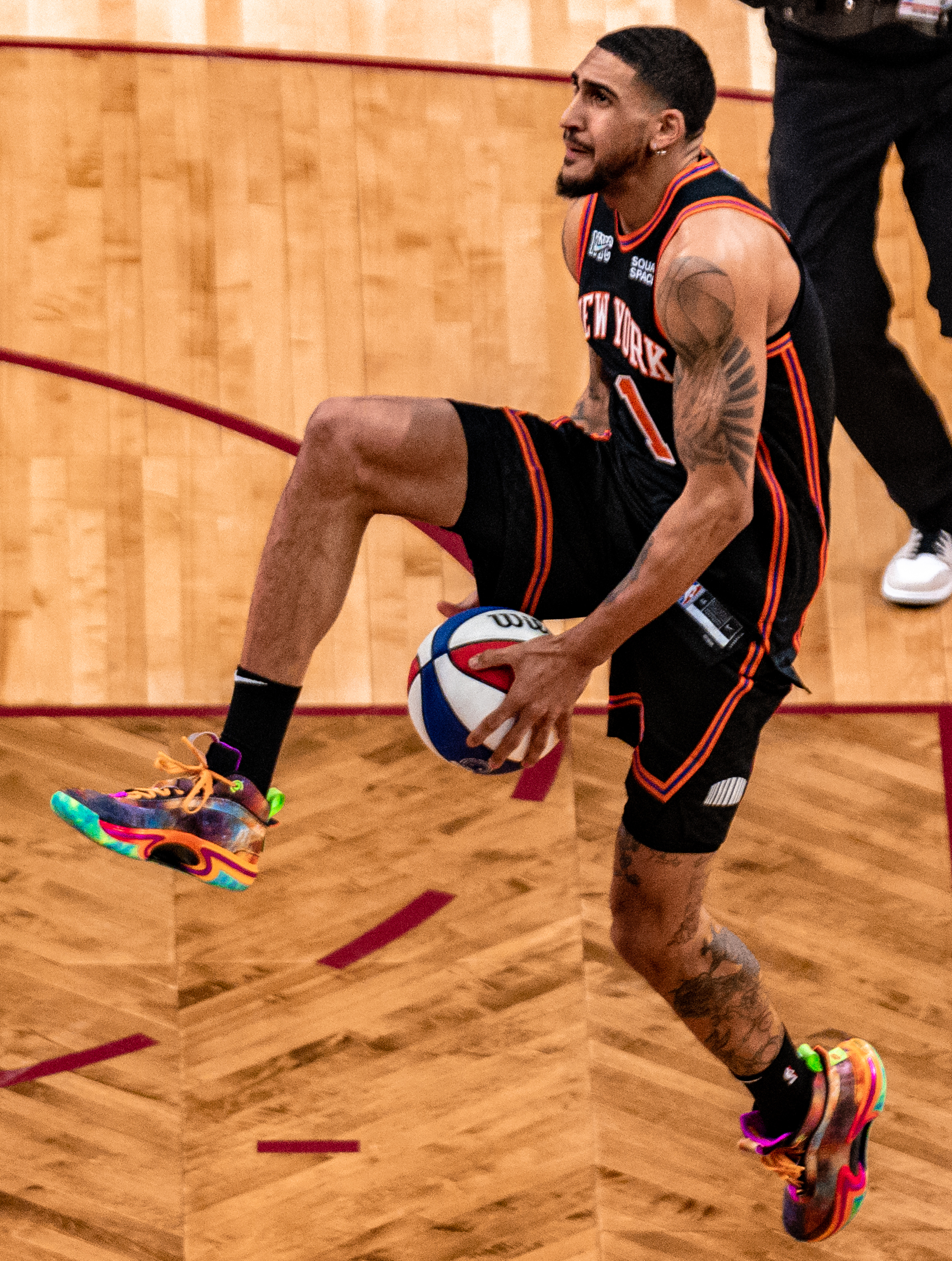
- Toppin during the 2022 NBA Slam Dunk Contest

No. 1 – Indiana Pacers
- Position: Power forward
- League: NBA

Personal information
- Born: March 4, 1998 (age 28) Brooklyn, New York, U.S.
- Listed height: 6 ft 9 in (2.06 m)
- Listed weight: 220 lb (100 kg)

Career information
- High school: Heritage (Palm Bay, Florida); Melbourne Central Catholic (Melbourne, Florida); Ossining (Ossining, New York); Mt. Zion Prep (Baltimore, Maryland)
- College: Dayton (2018–2020)
- NBA draft: 2020: 1st round, 8th overall pick
- Drafted by: New York Knicks
- Playing career: 2020–present

Career history
- 2020–2023: New York Knicks
- 2023–present: Indiana Pacers

Career highlights
- NBA Slam Dunk Contest champion (2022); National college player of the year (2020); Consensus first-team All-American (2020); Karl Malone Award (2020); Atlantic 10 Player of the Year (2020); 2× First-team All-Atlantic 10 (2019, 2020); Atlantic 10 Rookie of the Year (2019); Atlantic 10 All-Freshman Team (2019)
- Stats at NBA.com
- Stats at Basketball Reference

Obadiah Richard Toppin Jr. (/ˈoʊbi ˈtɒpɪn/ OH-bee TOP-in; born March 4, 1998) is an American professional basketball player for the Indiana Pacers of the National Basketball Association (NBA). A power forward, he played college basketball for the Dayton Flyers.

A native of New York City, Toppin was born in the borough of Brooklyn, and graduated from Ossining High School in New York. After receiving no NCAA Division I offers, he played a postgraduate season at Mt. Zion Preparatory School in Maryland. As a freshman with the Dayton Flyers, Toppin was named Atlantic 10 Rookie of the Year after leading his team in scoring. He had breakout success in his sophomore season, earning Atlantic 10 Player of the Year and National College Player of the Year honors.

After his sophomore college season, Toppin declared for the 2020 NBA draft where he was selected with the eighth overall pick by the New York Knicks. Toppin was the winner of the 2022 NBA Slam Dunk Contest after being runner-up in the year prior. He was traded to the Pacers in 2023 and reached the NBA Finals with the team in 2025.

== Early life ==
Toppin was born in Brooklyn in New York City and originally grew up in the neighborhood of Bushwick, before moving to Melbourne, Florida. He attended Heritage High School in Palm Bay, Florida as a freshman, before transferring to Melbourne Central Catholic High School the next year. Toppin, his mother, and younger brother relocated to Ossining, New York, and he enrolled at Ossining High School going into his junior year.

He averaged 20.6 points, 8.1 rebounds, 3 assists, and 3 steals as a senior during his only year playing varsity at Ossining and led the team to its first conference title in 10 years. Having received no NCAA Division I offers, Toppin opted to enroll at Mt. Zion Preparatory School in Baltimore, Maryland, for a postgraduate year. He averaged 17 points, eight rebounds, and four assists and also grew four inches to 6 feet 9 inches (2.06 m). He committed to play college basketball at the University of Dayton over offers from Rhode Island, Georgetown, Georgia, Texas A&M, Minnesota, and Texas Tech.

== College career ==
Toppin redshirted his true freshman season after being ruled academically ineligible to play. As a red-shirt freshman, Toppin led the Flyers with 14.4 points per game while averaging 5.6 rebounds per game and was named the Atlantic 10 Conference Rookie of the Week seven times. At the end of the season, Toppin was named the Atlantic 10 Rookie of the Year and to the first team All-Atlantic 10, the first freshman to do so since Lamar Odom in 1999. Following the end of the season he declared for the 2019 NBA draft, but did not hire an agent. After working out for several NBA teams, Toppin opted to withdraw from the draft and return to Dayton.

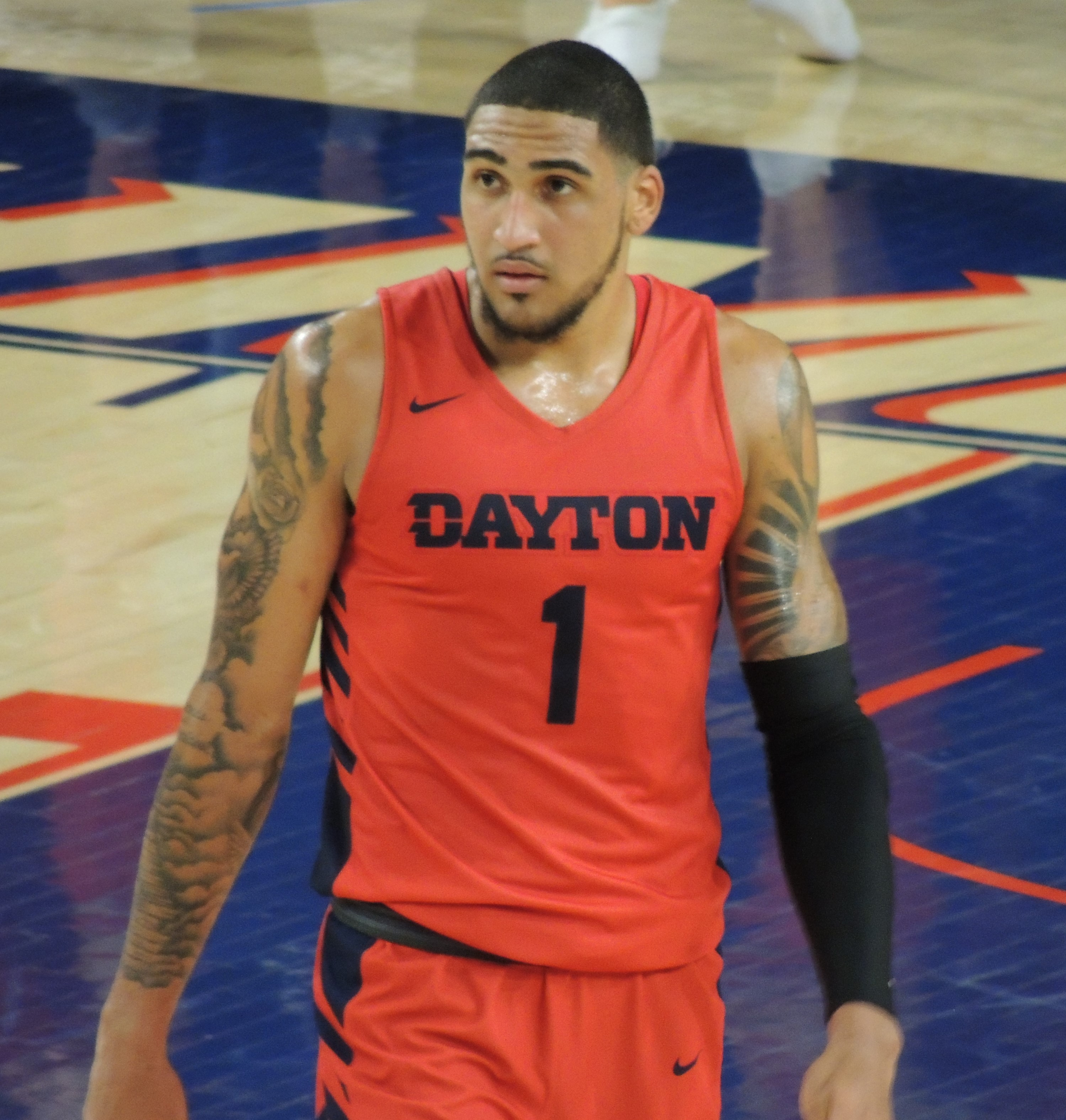
Toppin in 2020

Entering his red-shirt sophomore season, Toppin was named to the preseason first team All-Atlantic 10 and to the Karl Malone, Lute Olson and Naismith Award watch lists. Toppin was also named the 44th-best collegiate basketball player going into the 2019–20 season by CBS Sports and the 24th-best prospect for the 2020 NBA draft by ESPN. He was named the Atlantic 10 Player of the Week for the first week of the season after scoring a career-high 29 points with 12 rebounds in the Flyers' season opening 86–81 win over Indiana State. In late November 2019, Toppin led Dayton to second place at the 2019 Maui Invitational Tournament, averaging 22.3 points, 7.0 rebounds, 2.3 assists and 1.3 blocks over three games. He subsequently repeated as Atlantic 10 Player of the Week and was recognized as National Player of the Week by NBC Sports. On December 30, Toppin scored a career-high 31 points in a 77–59 win over North Florida, including a school-record 10 dunks. He was named to the midseason watchlist for the Wooden Award and was named the Midseason Player of the Year by The Athletic.

Toppin sprained his left ankle during a win against UMass on January 11, 2020, but did not miss a game, scoring 24 points in Dayton's next game against VCU in spite of his injury. Toppin scored his 1,000th career point on February 22, 2020, during a 28-point performance in an 80–70 win over Duquesne. At the end of the regular season Toppin was named to the first team All-Atlantic 10 and the Atlantic 10 Conference Men's Basketball Player of the Year after averaging 20 points, 7.5 rebounds and 1.2 blocks per game with a .633 field goal percentage. Toppin was a consensus first team All-American selection, won the Karl Malone Award as the nation's top power forward, and was the consensus National Player of the Year after being named the Associated Press College Basketball Player of the Year, NABC Player of the Year, Naismith College Player of the Year, and awarded the Oscar Robertson Trophy and the John R. Wooden Award. He also garnered national player of the year honors from CBS Sports, The Athletic, NBC Sports and USA Today. After the season, Toppin announced that he would be forgoing his final two seasons of eligibility to enter the 2020 NBA draft. Toppin finished his college career with 1,096 points scored and a school-record 190 dunks.

== Professional career ==
=== New York Knicks (2020–2023) ===
On November 18, 2020, Toppin was selected with the eighth overall pick in the 2020 NBA draft by the New York Knicks. On November 23, Toppin signed his rookie scale contract with the Knicks.

On December 23, Toppin made his NBA debut, putting up nine points, three rebounds, and two blocks in 24 minutes, in a 107–121 loss to the Indiana Pacers. Toppin missed 10 games due to injury sustained in his NBA debut, and returned on January 13, 2021, in a 109–116 loss to the Brooklyn Nets. As a rookie, he was invited to participate in the 2021 NBA Slam Dunk Contest and finished in 2nd place behind Anfernee Simons. During the 2021 NBA Playoffs, Toppin recorded 13 points on an efficient 5-of-8 shooting from the field in a Game 4 loss to the Atlanta Hawks.

The following season, in his sophomore year, Toppin was the winner of the 2022 NBA Slam Dunk Contest, beating Juan Toscano-Anderson in the final round. On April 8, 2022, Toppin recorded a then-career-high 35 points and 2 steals, on 14-of-22 shooting from the field, and 6-of-9 from three, in a 114–92 win over the Washington Wizards. On April 10, two days later, he recorded a career-high 42 points, along with 10 rebounds and a block, shooting 16-of-28 from the field, 6-of-14 from three and 4-of-4 from the free throw line, in a 105–94 win over the Toronto Raptors.

During the final 5 games of the 2022–23 Knicks season, Toppin became a starter. On April 5, 2023, he tallied an impressive 32 points and 6 assists on 11-of-18 shooting from the field, 5-of-12 from three, and 5-of-5 from the free throw line in a win over the Indiana Pacers. Four days later Toppin recorded 34 points, 7 rebounds, 5 assists, and 2 steals, on 13-of-23 shooting from the field, 5-of-10 on three, and 3-of-3 on free throws in a loss to his future team, the Indiana Pacers. During the 2023 NBA Playoffs, Toppin became a starter in the second round, replacing injured Julius Randle, and recorded a then playoff career-high 18 points and 8 rebounds on 7-of-15 shooting along with 4 threes made, in a Game 1 loss to the eventual Eastern Conference Champions Miami Heat.

=== Indiana Pacers (2023–present) ===
On July 7, 2023, Toppin was traded to the Indiana Pacers for two future second-round picks. The deal came one day after brother Jacob Toppin signed with the Knicks. On the Pacers, Toppin joined Jalen Smith, Tyrese Haliburton, Aaron Nesmith and Jordan Nwora, all selected in the 2020 NBA draft. On October 25, as a starter, Toppin tallied 11 points, four rebounds, an assist, and a steal in his debut, defeating the Washington Wizards. On November 6, Toppin recorded 19 points and two steals, on 6-of-11 shooting from the field and 6-of-6 on free throws, in a 41-point blowout win over rookie Victor Wembanyama and the San Antonio Spurs. On November 14, he recorded a season-high 27 points, six rebounds, and a block, on 12-of-15 shooting, in a 2023 in-season tournament win over the Philadelphia 76ers.

On January 26, 2024, Toppin put up a double-double with 23 points and 11 rebounds alongside a game-winning layup in a 133–131 win over the Phoenix Suns. Toppin finished the 2023–24 season averaging career–highs as the main backup to Pascal Siakam. On May 2, he scored a playoff career-high 21 points in a 120–98 series-clinching victory against the Milwaukee Bucks in the first round.

On July 6, 2024, Toppin re-signed with the Pacers on a four-year, $60 million contract. On March 17, 2025, in a 132–130 overtime win against the Minnesota Timberwolves, Toppin scored a season-high 34 points, including 12 in overtime and the game-winning three-pointer, to snap Minnesota's eight-game winning streak.

On October 31, 2025, Toppin was ruled out for at least three months after undergoing surgery to place a screw in the fifth metatarsal bone in his right foot.

== Career statistics ==
Legend
GP	Games played	GS	Games started	MPG	Minutes per game
FG%	Field goal percentage	3P%	3-point field goal percentage	FT%	Free throw percentage
RPG	Rebounds per game	APG	Assists per game	SPG	Steals per game
BPG	Blocks per game	PPG	Points per game	**Bold**	Career high
*	Led the league

=== NBA ===
==== Regular season ====
Year	Team	GP	GS	MPG	FG%	3P%	FT%	RPG	APG	SPG	BPG	PPG
2020–21	New York	62	0	11.0	.498	.306	.731	2.2	.5	.3	.2	4.1
2021–22	New York	72	10	17.1	.531	.308	.758	3.7	1.1	.3	**.5**	9.0
2022–23	New York	67	5	15.7	.446	.344	.809	2.8	1.0	.3	.2	7.4
2023–24	Indiana	**82**	**28**	**21.1**	**.573**	**.403**	.770	3.9	1.6	**.6**	**.5**	10.3
2024–25	Indiana	79	4	19.6	.529	.365	.781	4.0	1.6	**.6**	.4	10.5
2025–26	Indiana	24	3	17.7	.503	.352	**.913**	**4.4**	**2.3**	.5	.0	**11.6**
Career		386	50	17.3	.521	.355	.786	3.5	1.3	.4	.3	8.7

==== Playoffs ====
Year	Team	GP	GS	MPG	FG%	3P%	FT%	RPG	APG	SPG	BPG	PPG
2021	New York	5	0	13.1	.522	.333	**.833**	2.6	.4	.0	.2	6.4
2023	New York	11	**1**	15.9	.429	.302	.800	3.5	.6	**.7**	.3	7.0
2024	Indiana	17	0	**20.2**	**.541**	**.357**	.760	**4.4**	**1.7**	.4	**.4**	**10.9**
2025	Indiana	**23***	0	19.1	.485	.321	.694	3.8	1.3	**.7**	.3	9.4
Career		56	1	18.3	.496	.328	.736	3.8	1.2	.5	.3	9.1

=== College ===
Year	Team	GP	GS	MPG	FG%	3P%	FT%	RPG	APG	SPG	BPG	PPG
2018–19	Dayton	**33**	15	26.5	**.667**	**.524**	**.713**	5.6	1.8	.6	.8	14.4
2019–20	Dayton	31	**31**	**31.6**	.633	.390	.702	**7.5**	**2.2**	**1.0**	**1.2**	**20.0**
Career		64	46	29.0	.647	.417	.706	6.6	2.0	.8	1.0	17.1

== Personal life ==
Toppin's mother, Roni, is of Italian Jewish descent. Toppin's father, also named Obadiah, is of Barbadian descent and was a well-known streetball player in Brooklyn. He played basketball collegiately at Globe Institute of Technology and professionally for the Brooklyn Kings of the United States Basketball League, the Harlem Strong Dogs of the American Basketball Association and in the Dominican Republic. His father was also known as "Dunker's Delight" while playing for a streetball team called the Court Kingz.

His brother, Jacob Toppin, who played college basketball for Kentucky after transferring from Rhode Island, was signed by the Knicks in June 2023, later played for the Atlanta Hawks, and now plays for Hapoel Tel Aviv in the Israeli Basketball Premier League.

Toppin is a Christian and has a tattoo of a cross on his right shoulder as a sign of his faith.
