= 2019–20 Duquesne Dukes men's basketball team =

American college basketball season

2019–20 Duquesne Dukes men's basketball

Junkanoo Jam Champions
- Conference: Atlantic 10 Conference
- Record: 21–9 (11–7 A-10)
- Head coach: Keith Dambrot (3rd season)
- Assistant coaches: Rick McFadden; Terry Weigand; Charles Thomas; Carl Thomas
- Home arena: Multiple venues

2019–20 Atlantic 10 men's basketball standings
	Conf.				Overall
Team	W		L	PCT	W		L	PCT
No. 3 Dayton	18	–	0	1.000	29	–	2	.935
Richmond	14	–	4	.778	24	–	7	.774
Rhode Island	13	–	5	.722	21	–	9	.700
Saint Louis	12	–	6	.667	23	–	8	.742
St. Bonaventure	11	–	7	.611	19	–	12	.613
Duquesne	11	–	7	.611	21	–	9	.700
Davidson	10	–	8	.556	16	–	14	.533
Massachusetts	8	–	10	.444	14	–	17	.452
VCU	8	–	10	.444	18	–	13	.581
La Salle	6	–	12	.333	15	–	15	.500
George Washington	6	–	12	.333	12	–	20	.375
George Mason	5	–	13	.278	17	–	15	.531
Saint Joseph's	2	–	16	.111	6	–	26	.188
Fordham	2	–	16	.111	9	–	22	.290
Note: The 2020 A-10 tournament was canceled after the first round due to the COVID-19 pandemic. Rankings from AP poll

The 2019–20 Duquesne Dukes men's basketball team represented Duquesne University during the 2019–20 NCAA Division I men's basketball season. The Dukes, led by third-year head coach Keith Dambrot, were members of the Atlantic 10 Conference (A-10). The Dukes finished the season 21–9, 11–7 in A-10 play, to finish in a tie for fifth place. Their season ended when the A-10 tournament and all other postseason tournament were canceled due to the ongoing coronavirus pandemic.

Due to the closure of the Dukes' normal home of UPMC Cooper Fieldhouse (formerly Palumbo Center) for major renovations, the team used three venues for its home games: Kerr Fitness Center at La Roche University in the northern suburb of McCandless, UPMC Events Center at Robert Morris University in the northwest suburb of Moon Township, and PPG Paints Arena in downtown Pittsburgh.

== Previous season ==
The Dukes finished the 2018–19 season 19–13, 7–11 in A-10 play, to finish in a tie for sixth place. As the No. 7 seed in the A-10 tournament, they lost to Saint Joseph's in the second round.

== Offseason ==
=== Departures ===
Name	Number	Pos.	Height	Weight	Year	Hometown	Reason for departure
Mike Lewis II	1	G	6'1"	185	Junior	St. Louis, MO	Graduate transferred to Saint Louis
Brandon Wade	2	G	6'2"	185	Freshman	Ann Arbor, MI	Transferred
Craig Randall II	4	G	6'4"	185	RS Junior	Youngstown, OH	Midseason transferred to UT Martin
Gavin Bizeau	14	F	6'11"	230	Freshman	Plainfield, IN	Transferred to Toledo
Kellon Taylor	20	F	6'5"	220	Junior	Landover, MD	Walk-on; left the team for personal reasons
Dylan Swingle	25	C	6'11"	300	Freshman	Chillicothe, OH	Transferred to Bowling Green
Zach Snyder	32	F	6'5"	210	Senior	Cranberry Township, PA	Graduated
Eric Williams Jr.	50	G	6'6"	205	Sophomore	New Haven, MI	Transferred to Oregon

=== Incoming transfers ===
Name	Number	Pos.	Height	Weight	Year	Hometown	Previous school
Baylee Steele	44	C	6'11"	245	RS Senior	Norwalk, IA	Graduate transferred from Utah Valley. Will be eligible to play immediately, graduated from Utah Valley.

=== 2019 recruiting class ===
College recruiting information
Name	Hometown	School	Height	Weight	Commit date
Maceo Austin; SG	Sharon, PA	Kennedy Catholic High School	6 ft 5 in (1.96 m)	170 lb (77 kg)	Oct 5, 2018
Maceo Austin; SG	Recruit ratings: Scout: Rivals: (77)				
Evan Buckley; PG	Ashburn, VA	Stone Bridge High School	6 ft 0 in (1.83 m)	175 lb (79 kg)	Apr 7, 2019
Evan Buckley; PG	Recruit ratings: Scout: Rivals: (NR)				
Ashton Miller; SG	West Orange, NJ	Seton Hall Prep	6 ft 4 in (1.93 m)	175 lb (79 kg)	
Ashton Miller; SG	Recruit ratings: Scout: Rivals: (NR)				
Overall recruit ranking:
Note: In many cases, Scout, Rivals, 247Sports, On3, and ESPN may conflict in their listings of height and weight.; In these cases, the average was taken. ESPN grades are on a 100-point scale.; Sources: "2019 Team Ranking". Rivals.

== Roster ==
2019–20 Duquesne Dukes men's basketball team
Players
Coaches

Pos.	#	Name	Height	Weight	Year	Previous school	Hometown
G	0	Tavian Dunn-Martin	5 ft 8 in (1.73 m)	155 lb (70 kg)	RS Jr	Huntington HS; Akron	Huntington, WV
C	1	James Ellis	6 ft 11 in (2.11 m)	230 lb (104 kg)	RS Fr	Westinghouse	Pittsburgh, PA
G	2	Maceo Austin	6 ft 5 in (1.96 m)	190 lb (86 kg)	Fr	Kennedy Catholic	Sharon, PA
G	3	Frankie Hughes	6 ft 4 in (1.93 m)	195 lb (88 kg)	RS Jr	Garfield Heights; Missouri	Cleveland, OH
G	4	Lamar Norman Jr.	6 ft 3 in (1.91 m)	180 lb (82 kg)	So	Godwin Heights	Wyoming, MI
F	5	Marcus Weathers	6 ft 5 in (1.96 m)	215 lb (98 kg)	RS Jr	Shawnee Mission North; Miami (OH)	Overland Park, KS
G	10	Sincere Carry	6 ft 1 in (1.85 m)	180 lb (82 kg)	So	Solon	Solon, OH
G	14	Ashton Miller	6 ft 5 in (1.96 m)	200 lb (91 kg)	Fr	Seton Hall Prep	Scotch Plains, NJ
C	21	Michael Hughes	6 ft 8 in (2.03 m)	240 lb (109 kg)	RS Jr	Liberty North; Akron	Liberty, MO
G	22	Evan Buckley	6 ft 1 in (1.85 m)	185 lb (84 kg)	Fr	Stone Bridge	Ashburn, VA
F	23	Amari Kelly	6 ft 9 in (2.06 m)	230 lb (104 kg)	So	Meadowcreek	Long Island, NY
G	30	Jake Harper (W)	6 ft 3 in (1.91 m)	175 lb (79 kg)	Fr	Avonworth	Dayton, OH
G	31	Caleb Davis (W)	6 ft 0 in (1.83 m)	175 lb (79 kg)	Sr	Valley	New Kensington, PA
F	34	Austin Rotroff	6 ft 10 in (2.08 m)	240 lb (109 kg)	So	Wauseon	Wauseon, OH
C	44	Baylee Steele	6 ft 11 in (2.11 m)	240 lb (109 kg)	RS Sr	Norwalk; Utah Valley	Norwalk, IA

Head coach

- Keith Dambrot (Akron)

Assistant coach(es)

- Rick McFadden (Akron)
- Terry Weigand (Ashland)
- Charles Thomas (Eastern Michigan)
- Carl Thomas (Eastern Michigan)

Legend

- (C) Team captain
- (S) Suspended
- (I) Ineligible
- (W) Walk-on
- Injured
- Current redshirt

Roster
Last update: June 13, 2024

== Schedule and results ==
Date time, TV	Rank^{#}	Opponent^{#}	Result	Record	Site (attendance) city, state
Exhibition
November 1, 2019*; 7:00 p.m., ATTSNPT		at West Virginia	L 70–78		WVU Coliseum (9,705); Morgantown, WV
Non-conference regular season
November 5, 2019*; 6:00 p.m., ESPN+		Princeton	W 94–67	1–0	PPG Paints Arena (2,213); Pittsburgh, PA
November 12, 2018*; 7:00 p.m., ESPN+		Lamar	W 66–56	2–0	Kerr Fitness Center (859); McCandless, PA
November 15, 2019*; 7:00 p.m., ESPN+		Lipscomb	W 58–36	3–0	Kerr Fitness Center (1,143); McCandless, PA
November 21, 2019*; 6:30 p.m.		vs. Indiana State; Junkanoo Jam	W 74–71	4–0	Gateway Christian Academy Gymnasium (300); Bimini, Bahamas
November 22, 2019*; 6:30 p.m.		vs. Air Force; Junkanoo Jam	W 69–63	5–0	Gateway Christian Academy Gymnasium (250); Bimini, Bahamas
November 24, 2019*; 6:30 p.m.		vs. Loyola Marymount; Junkanoo Jam	W 71–50	6–0	Gateway Christian Academy Gymnasium (200); Bimini, Bahamas
December 4, 2019*; 7:00 p.m., ESPN+		VMI	W 71–58	7–0	Kerr Fitness Center (1,204); McCandless, PA
December 9, 2019*; 7:00 p.m., ESPN+		Columbia	W 90–54	8–0	Kerr Fitness Center (1,189); McCandless, PA
December 14, 2019*; 2:00 p.m.		vs. Radford	W 71–49	9–0	Willoughby Gymnasium (812); Akron, OH
December 21, 2019*; 2:30 p.m.		vs. Austin Peay; St. Pete Shootout	W 86–77	10–0	McArthur Center (176); St. Petersburg, FL
December 22, 2019*; 2:30 p.m.		vs. UAB; St. Pete Shootout	L 68–77	10–1	McArthur Center (301); St. Petersburg, FL
December 29, 2019*; 2:30 p.m.		vs. Marshall; Cleveland Classic	L 61–83	10–2	Rocket Mortgage FieldHouse (16,780); Cleveland, OH
Atlantic 10 regular season
January 2, 2020; 7:00 p.m., ESPN+		Saint Louis	W 73–59	11–2 (1–0)	UPMC Events Center (1,478); Moon Township, PA
January 5, 2020; 2:00 p.m., NBCSN		Davidson	W 71–64	12–2 (2–0)	UPMC Events Center (1,897); Moon Township, PA
January 8, 2020; 7:00 p.m., ESPN+		at Saint Joseph's	W 78–60	13–2 (3–0)	Hagan Arena (1,885); Philadelphia, PA
January 11, 2020; 4:00 p.m., ESPN+		at George Washington	W 66–61	14–2 (4–0)	Charles E. Smith Center (2,302); Washington, D.C.
January 15, 2020; 7:00 p.m., ESPN+		Fordham	W 58–56	15–2 (5–0)	PPG Paints Arena (2,356); Pittsburgh, PA
January 22, 2020; 7:00 p.m., ESPN+		at Rhode Island	L 55–77	15–3 (5–1)	Ryan Center (6,007); Kingston, RI
January 25, 2020; 2:00 p.m., ESPN+		at Massachusetts	L 64–73	15–4 (5–2)	Mullins Center (2,785); Amherst, MA
January 29, 2020; 7:00 p.m., CBSSN		No. 7 Dayton	L 69–73	15–5 (5–3)	PPG Paints Arena (7,001); Pittsburgh, PA
February 2, 2020; 2:00 p.m., ESPN+		La Salle	W 71–69	16–5 (6–3)	PPG Paints Arena (2,450); Pittsburgh, PA
February 5, 2020; 7:00 p.m., ESPN+		at Saint Louis	W 82–68	17–5 (7–3)	Chaifetz Arena (5,205); St. Louis, MO
February 8, 2020; 3:00 p.m., NBCSN		St. Bonaventure	L 80–83	17–6 (7–4)	UPMC Events Center (3,058); Moon Township, PA
February 16, 2020; 2:00 p.m., NBCSN		at Fordham	W 59–54	18–6 (8–4)	Rose Hill Gymnasium (1,576); The Bronx, NY
February 19, 2020; 8:00 p.m., ESPN+		George Washington	L 67–70	18–7 (8–5)	PPG Paints Arena (1,934); Pittsburgh, PA
February 22, 2020; 2:00 p.m., Stadium		at No. 5 Dayton	L 70–80	18–8 (8–6)	UD Arena (13,407); Dayton, OH
February 26, 2020; 7:00 p.m., Stadium		at St. Bonaventure	W 81–77 ^{OT}	19–8 (9–6)	Reilly Center (4,548); Olean, NY
February 29, 2020; 7:00 p.m., ESPN+		George Mason	W 81–78	20–8 (10–6)	UPMC Events Center (2,292); Moon Township, PA
March 3, 2020; 7:00 p.m., ESPN+		at VCU	W 80–77 ^{OT}	21–8 (11–6)	Siegel Center (7,637); Richmond, VA
March 6, 2020; 7:00 p.m., ESPN+		Richmond	L 62–73	21–9 (11–7)	PPG Paints Arena (3,211); Pittsburgh, PA
Atlantic 10 tournament
March 12, 2020; 8:30 p.m., NBCSN	(6)	vs. (14) Fordham; Second round	A-10 tournament canceled		Barclays Center; Brooklyn, NY
*Non-conference game. ^{#}Rankings from AP poll / Coaches' Poll. (#) Tournament seedings in parentheses. All times are in Eastern.
