= 2019–20 Dayton Flyers men's basketball team =

American college basketball season

2019–20 Dayton Flyers men's basketball

Atlantic 10 regular season champions
- Conference: Atlantic 10 Conference

Ranking
- Coaches: No. 3
- AP: No. 3
- Record: 29–2 (18–0 A-10)
- Head coach: Anthony Grant (3rd season)
- Associate head coach: Anthony Solomon
- Assistant coaches: Darren Hertz; Ricardo Greer
- Home arena: UD Arena

2019–20 Atlantic 10 men's basketball standings
	Conf.				Overall
Team	W		L	PCT	W		L	PCT
No. 3 Dayton	18	–	0	1.000	29	–	2	.935
Richmond	14	–	4	.778	24	–	7	.774
Rhode Island	13	–	5	.722	21	–	9	.700
Saint Louis	12	–	6	.667	23	–	8	.742
St. Bonaventure	11	–	7	.611	19	–	12	.613
Duquesne	11	–	7	.611	21	–	9	.700
Davidson	10	–	8	.556	16	–	14	.533
Massachusetts	8	–	10	.444	14	–	17	.452
VCU	8	–	10	.444	18	–	13	.581
La Salle	6	–	12	.333	15	–	15	.500
George Washington	6	–	12	.333	12	–	20	.375
George Mason	5	–	13	.278	17	–	15	.531
Saint Joseph's	2	–	16	.111	6	–	26	.188
Fordham	2	–	16	.111	9	–	22	.290
Note: The 2020 A-10 tournament was canceled after the first round due to the COVID-19 pandemic. Rankings from AP poll

The 2019–20 Dayton Flyers men's basketball team represented the University of Dayton during the 2019–20 NCAA Division I men's basketball season. The Flyers were led by third-year head coach Anthony Grant and played their home games at the University of Dayton Arena as members of the Atlantic 10 Conference.

The Flyers finished the season with an overall record of 29–2 and were undefeated regular season champions of the Atlantic 10. Grant was named consensus national coach of the year while sophomore Obi Toppin became Dayton's first consensus first-team All-American and earned the majority of major college player of the year awards, including the Naismith College Player of the Year and the John R. Wooden Award. The season was cut short due to the COVID-19 pandemic prior to the Flyers’ first game of the Atlantic 10 tournament. They finished ranked third in both major polls, their highest ranking in a major media poll since the Don Donoher era.

== Previous season ==
The Flyers finished the 2018–19 season 21–12, 13–5 in A-10 play to finish in third place. They lost in the quarterfinals of the A-10 tournament to Saint Louis. They received an at-large bid to the NIT where they lost in the first round to Colorado.

== Offseason ==
=== Departures ===
Name	Number	Pos.	Height	Weight	Year	Hometown	Reason for departure
Josh Cunningham	0	F	6'7"	233	RS Senior	Chicago, IL	Graduated
Frankie Policelli	2	F	6'8"	235	Freshman	New Hartford, NY	Transferred to Stony Brook
Jordan Davis	4	G	6'2"	195	Sophomore	Irmo, SC	Transferred to Middle Tennessee
Jack Westerfield	23	G	6'1"	180	Senior	Cincinnati, OH	Graduated

=== Incoming transfers ===
Name	Number	Pos.	Height	Weight	Year	Hometown	Previous School
Chase Johnson	40	F	6'9"	219	RS Sophomore	Ripley, WV	Transferred from Florida. Under NCAA transfer rules, Johnson would have sat out the 2019–20 season, but was granted a waiver to play immediately.

=== Recruiting class of 2019 ===
College recruiting information
Name	Hometown	School	Height	Weight	Commit date
Moulaye Sissoko; PF	Atlanta, GA	Lincoln Academy	6 ft 9 in (2.06 m)	223 lb (101 kg)	Oct 8, 2018
Moulaye Sissoko; PF	Recruit ratings: Scout: Rivals: (79)				
Overall recruit ranking:
Note: In many cases, Scout, Rivals, 247Sports, On3, and ESPN may conflict in their listings of height and weight.; In these cases, the average was taken. ESPN grades are on a 100-point scale.; Sources: "2019 Team Ranking". Rivals.

=== Recruiting class of 2020 ===
College recruiting information (2020)
Name	Hometown	School	Height	Weight	Commit date
R.J. Blakeny; SF	Hagerstown, MD	Loomis Chaffee School	6 ft 5 in (1.96 m)	223 lb (101 kg)	Oct 25, 2019
R.J. Blakeny; SF	Recruit ratings: Scout: Rivals: (75)				
Koby Brea; SG	Bronx, NY	Monsignor Scanlan High School	6 ft 5 in (1.96 m)	175 lb (79 kg)	Nov 13, 2019
Koby Brea; SG	Recruit ratings: Scout: Rivals: (NR)				
Lukas Frazier; PG	Mentor, OH	Lake Catholic High School	6 ft 4 in (1.93 m)	175 lb (79 kg)	Jun 11, 2019
Lukas Frazier; PG	Recruit ratings: Scout: Rivals: (NR)				
Overall recruit ranking:
Note: In many cases, Scout, Rivals, 247Sports, On3, and ESPN may conflict in their listings of height and weight.; In these cases, the average was taken. ESPN grades are on a 100-point scale.; Sources: "2020 Team Ranking". Rivals.

== Roster ==
2019–20 Dayton Flyers men's basketball team
Players
Coaches

Pos.	#	Name	Height	Weight	Year	Previous school	Hometown
G	0	Rodney Chatman	6 ft 1 in (1.85 m)	178 lb (81 kg)	RS Jr	Lithonia; Chattanooga	Lithonia, GA
F	1	Obi Toppin	6 ft 9 in (2.06 m)	220 lb (100 kg)	RS So	Mt. Zion Prep (MD)	Ossining, NY
G	2	Ibi Watson	6 ft 5 in (1.96 m)	203 lb (92 kg)	RS Jr	Pickerington Central; Michigan	Pickerington, OH
G	3	Trey Landers	6 ft 5 in (1.96 m)	221 lb (100 kg)	Sr	Wayne	Huber Heights, OH
G	4	Jared Becker (W)	6 ft 4 in (1.93 m)	180 lb (82 kg)	Fr	Moeller	Milford, OH
G	10	Jalen Crutcher	6 ft 1 in (1.85 m)	175 lb (79 kg)	Jr	Ridgeway	Memphis, TN
G	11	Sean Loughran (W)	6 ft 3 in (1.91 m)	200 lb (91 kg)	Fr	Mount Lebanon	Pittsburgh, PA
C	14	Moulaye Sissoko	6 ft 9 in (2.06 m)	248 lb (112 kg)	Fr	Lincoln Academy	Bamako, Mali
G	31	Jhery Matos	6 ft 5 in (1.96 m)	196 lb (89 kg)	RS Jr	West Oaks Academy; Monroe College	Santo Domingo, DR
C	32	Jordy Tshimanga	6 ft 11 in (2.11 m)	268 lb (122 kg)	RS Jr	The MacDuffie School; Nebraska	Montreal, QC
F	33	Ryan Mikesell	6 ft 7 in (2.01 m)	217 lb (98 kg)	RS Sr	St. Henry	St. Henry, OH
G	35	Dwayne Cohill	6 ft 2 in (1.88 m)	180 lb (82 kg)	So	Holy Name	Cleveland, OH
F	40	Chase Johnson	6 ft 9 in (2.06 m)	219 lb (99 kg)	RS So	Huntington Prep; Florida	Ripley, WV
G	51	Drew Swerlein (W)	6 ft 0 in (1.83 m)	175 lb (79 kg)	RS Fr	St. Francis de Sales	Perrysburg, OH
G	52	Camron Greer (W)	5 ft 7 in (1.7 m)	160 lb (73 kg)	Jr	Rich Central	Country Club Hills, IL
G	53	Christian Wilson (W)	6 ft 1 in (1.85 m)	160 lb (73 kg)	RS So	Northmont	Dayton, OH

Head coach

- Anthony Grant (Dayton)

Assistant coach(es)

- Anthony Solomon (Virginia)
- Darren Hertz (Florida)
- Ricardo Greer (Pittsburgh)

Legend

- (C) Team captain
- (S) Suspended
- (I) Ineligible
- (W) Walk-on
- Injured
- Current redshirt

Roster

== Schedule and results ==
Date time, TV	Rank^{#}	Opponent^{#}	Result	Record	High points	High rebounds	High assists	Site (attendance) city, state
Exhibition
November 2, 2019*; 5:00 pm		Cedarville	W 93–60	0–0	17 – Watson	9 – Sissoko	4 – tied	UD Arena (13,207); Dayton, OH
Non-conference regular season
November 9, 2019*; 7:00 pm, SPECN1		Indiana State	W 86–81	1–0	29 – Toppin	12 – Toppin	6 – Crutcher	UD Arena (13,407); Dayton, OH
November 16, 2019*; 7:00 pm, FSOH		Charleston Southern	W 90–61	2–0	21 – Toppin	11 – Toppin	8 – Chatman	UD Arena (13,407); Dayton, OH
November 19, 2019*; 7:00 pm, SPECN1		Omaha	W 93–68	3–0	21 – Toppin	6 – Toppin	7 – Crutcher	UD Arena (13,193); Dayton, OH
November 25, 2019*; 2:30 pm, ESPN2		vs. Georgia; Maui Invitational tournament quarterfinals	W 80–61	4–0	25 – Toppin	4 – Tied	3 – Crutcher	Lahaina Civic Center (2,400); Lahaina, HI
November 26, 2019*; 8:00 pm, ESPN		vs. Virginia Tech; Maui Invitational Tournament semifinals	W 89–62	5–0	24 – Toppin	8 – Toppin	9 – Crutcher	Lahaina Civic Center (2,400); Lahaina, HI
November 27, 2019*; 5:00 pm, ESPN		vs. No. 4 Kansas; Maui Invitational Tournament championship game	L 84–90 ^{OT}	5–1	19 – Mikesell	9 – Toppin	8 – Crutcher	Lahaina Civic Center (2,400); Lahaina, HI
December 3, 2019*; 7:00 pm, ESPN+	No. 19	Houston Baptist	W 99–68	6–1	18 – Johnson	10 – Toppin	7 – Chatman	UD Arena (13,166); Dayton, OH
December 8, 2019*; 4:00 pm, ESPNU	No. 19	vs. Saint Mary's; Jerry Colangelo Classic	W 78–68	7–1	21 – Crutcher	8 – Landers	6 – Crutcher	Talking Stick Resort Arena (3,563); Phoenix, AZ
December 14, 2019*; 7:00 pm, ESPN+	No. 14	Drake	W 78–47	8–1	20 – Watson	10 – Landers	5 – Chatman	UD Arena (13,407); Dayton, OH
December 17, 2019*; 7:00 pm, ESPN+	No. 13	North Texas	W 71–58	9–1	16 – Tied	7 – Toppin	6 – Tied	UD Arena (13,129); Dayton, OH
December 21, 2019*; 6:30 pm, CBSSN	No. 13	vs. Colorado; Chicago Legends	L 76–78 ^{OT}	9–2	19 – Crutcher	7 – Toppin	4 – Tied	United Center; Chicago, IL
December 23, 2019*; 7:00 pm, ESPN+	No. 18	Grambling State	W 81–53	10–2	30 – Watson	9 – Landers	6 – Tied	UD Arena (13,407); Dayton, OH
December 30, 2019*; 7:00 pm, ESPN+	No. 20	North Florida	W 77–59	11–2	31 – Toppin	8 – Toppin	9 – Chatman	UD Arena (13,407); Dayton, OH
Atlantic 10 regular season
January 2, 2020; 8:30 pm, CBSSN	No. 20	at La Salle	W 84–58	12–2 (1–0)	20 – Toppin	8 – Landers	6 – Landers	Tom Gola Arena (2,241); Philadelphia, PA
January 5, 2020; 1:00 pm, ESPN+	No. 20	at Saint Joseph's	W 80–67	13–2 (2–0)	18 – Tied	9 – Landers	10 – Crutcher	Hagan Arena (2,544); Philadelphia, PA
January 11, 2020; 12:30 pm, NBCSN	No. 15	UMass	W 88–60	14–2 (3–0)	16 – Toppin	14 – Mikesell	3 – Tied	UD Arena (13,407); Dayton, OH
January 14, 2020; 8:00 pm, CBSSN	No. 13	VCU	W 79–65	15–2 (4–0)	24 – Toppin	9 – Tied	5 – Crutcher	UD Arena (13,407); Dayton, OH
January 17, 2020; 7:00 pm, ESPN2	No. 13	at Saint Louis	W 78–76 ^{OT}	16–2 (5–0)	21 – Crutcher	10 – Toppin	3 – Tied	Chaifetz Arena (10,007); St. Louis, MO
January 22, 2020; 7:00 pm, CBSSN	No. 7	St. Bonaventure	W 86–60	17–2 (6–0)	23 – Crutcher	9 – Toppin	7 – Crutcher	UD Arena (13,407); Dayton, OH
January 25, 2020; 6:00 pm, ESPN+	No. 7	at Richmond	W 87–79	18–2 (7–0)	24 – Tied	12 – Toppin	7 – Crutcher	Robins Center (7,201); Richmond, VA
January 29, 2020; 7:00 pm, CBSSN	No. 7	at Duquesne	W 73–69	19–2 (8–0)	22 – Toppin	10 – Toppin	6 – Crutcher	PPG Paints Arena (7,001); Pittsburgh, PA
February 1, 2020; 2:00 pm, NBCSN	No. 7	Fordham	W 70–56	20–2 (9–0)	18 – Tied	8 – Landers	6 – Crutcher	UD Arena (13,407); Dayton, OH
February 8, 2020; 2:00 pm, CBSSN	No. 6	Saint Louis	W 71–65	21–2 (10–0)	17 – Tied	8 – Mikesell	4 – Crutcher	UD Arena (13,407); Dayton, OH
February 11, 2020; 7:30 pm, CBSSN	No. 6	Rhode Island	W 81–67	22–2 (11–0)	22 – Toppin	14 – Landers	4 – Chatman	UD Arena (13,407); Dayton, OH
February 15, 2020; 12:30 pm, NBCSN	No. 6	at UMass	W 71–63	23–2 (12–0)	19 – Toppin	7 – Tied	5 – Crutcher	Mullins Center (5,030); Amherst, MA
February 18, 2020; 8:30 pm, CBSSN	No. 5	at VCU	W 66–61	24–2 (13–0)	18 – Crutcher	7 – Landers	3 – Watson	Siegel Center (7,637); Richmond, VA
February 22, 2020; 2:00 pm, Stadium/FSOH	No. 5	Duquesne	W 80–70	25–2 (14–0)	28 – Toppin	11 – Landers	5 – Tied	UD Arena (13,407); Dayton, OH
February 25, 2020; 7:00 pm, Stadium/FSOH	No. 4	at George Mason	W 62–55	26–2 (15–0)	19 – Toppin	8 – Tied	3 – Crutcher	EagleBank Arena (4,703); Fairfax, VA
February 28, 2020; 7:00 pm, ESPN2	No. 4	Davidson	W 82–67	27–2 (16–0)	23 – Toppin	12 – Toppin	7 – Crutcher	UD Arena (13,407); Dayton, OH
March 4, 2020; 9:00 pm, CBSSN	No. 3	at Rhode Island	W 84–57	28–2 (17–0)	20 – Toppin	14 – Landers	5 – Crutcher	Ryan Center (7,895); Kingston, RI
March 7, 2020; 7:00 pm, ESPN+	No. 3	George Washington; ESPN College GameDay	W 76–51	29–2 (18–0)	27 – Toppin	10 – Landers	5 – Tied	UD Arena (13,407); Dayton, OH
Atlantic 10 tournament
March 13, 2020; 12:00 pm, NBCSN	(1) No. 3	vs. TBD; Quarterfinals	A10 Tournament Canceled					Barclays Center; Brooklyn, NY
*Non-conference game. ^{#}Rankings from AP Poll. (#) Tournament seedings in parentheses. All times are in Eastern Time.

== Rankings ==
Ranking movements Legend: ██ Increase in ranking ██ Decrease in ranking RV = Received votes
	Week																		
Poll	Pre	1	2	3	4	5	6	7	8	9	10	11	12	13	14	15	16	17	Final
AP	RV	RV	RV	RV	19	14	13	18	20	15	13	7	7	6	6	5	4	3	3
Coaches	RV	RV*	RV	RV	17	12	12	18	18	15	11	7	7	6	6	5	3	3	3

*AP does not release post-NCAA Tournament rankings
