= Jimmy Bell Jr. =

American football player (born 2000)

Profile
- Position: Offensive tackle

Personal information
- Born: July 8, 2000 (age 26)
- Listed height: 6 ft 9 in (2.06 m)
- Listed weight: 330 lb (150 kg)

Career information
- High school: Arthur Hill (Saginaw, Michigan); Bella Vista College Prep (Scottsdale, Arizona)
- College: Saint Louis (2019–2021); Moberly Area CC (2021–2022); West Virginia (2022–2023); Mississippi State (2023–2024)

Jimmy Bell Jr. (born July 8, 2000) is an American professional football offensive tackle. He previously played college basketball for the Saint Louis Billikens, at Moberly Area Community College, for the West Virginia Mountaineers and the Mississippi State Bulldogs.

== Early life ==
Bell was born on July 8, 2000, and grew up in Saginaw, Michigan. He played football growing up before transitioning to basketball due to his height. He attended Arthur Hill High School in Saginaw, where he played both football and basketball for two seasons, before transferring to Bella Vista College Preparatory. He had played in football as an offensive lineman at Arthur Hill, weighing over 350 pounds (160 kg), but dropped to 290 pounds (130 kg) at Bella Vista and only played basketball there. He averaged 11 points and 10 rebounds as a senior at Bella Vista and committed to play college basketball for the Saint Louis Billikens; he had also received interest from schools to play football.

== College career ==
Bell began his career with the Billkens in 2019. He started 30 of 31 games as a freshman during the 2019–20 season, averaging 3.8 points and 3.1 rebounds while making 47% of his shots. He played in 19 games, five as a starter, in 2020–21, averaging 1.9 points and 1.8 rebounds. He transferred to Moberly Area Community College for the 2021–22 season, starting 29 of 35 games while recording averages of 9.3 points and 9.1 rebounds per game. He shot 59% and helped Moberly advance to the second round of the NJCAA Tournament.

Bell transferred to the West Virginia Mountaineers in 2022. With the Mountaineers in the 2022–23 season, he averaged 4.8 points and 5.2 rebounds. In the spring of 2023, he practiced with the Mountaineers football team as an offensive lineman. He then transferred to continue his basketball career with the Mississippi State Bulldogs for the 2023–24 season. He appeared in 35 games and averaged 5.0 points and 4.9 rebounds while shooting 46.9%. He concluded his college basketball career with 154 games played, 114 as a starter, scoring 491 points and totaling 479 rebounds, 50 assists, 49 blocks and 44 steals. Out of basketball eligibility, he trained with the Mississippi State football team in 2024, although he did not play in any games.

== Professional career ==
Following the 2025 NFL draft, Bell signed with the Los Angeles Chargers of the National Football League (NFL) to play offensive tackle.
