= Sincere Carry =

American basketball player (born 1999)

No. 89 – AEL Limassol
- Position: Point guard
- League: Cyprus Basket League; ENBL

Personal information
- Born: September 15, 1999 (age 27)
- Listed height: 6 ft 1 in (1.85 m)
- Listed weight: 185 lb (84 kg)

Career information
- High school: Solon (Solon, Ohio)
- College: Duquesne (2018–2021); Kent State (2021–2023)
- NBA draft: 2023: undrafted
- Playing career: 2023–present

Career history
- 2023–2024: Iraklis BC
- 2024–2025: Phoenix Hagen
- 2025–2026: HKK Siroki
- 2026: Cedevita Junior
- 2026: Calgary Surge
- 2026–present: AEL Limassol B.C.

Career highlights
- MAC Player of the Year (2022); 2× First-team All-MAC (2022, 2023); 2× MAC All-Defensive Team (2022, 2023); Atlantic 10 All-Rookie Team (2019)

Sincere Carry (born September 15, 1999) is an American basketball player who plays for AEL Limassol B.C. of the Cyprus Basket League and ENBL. He played college basketball for the Kent State Golden Flashes and the Duquesne Dukes.

== Early life ==
Carry grew up in Hermitage, Pennsylvania and became friends with Kevin Bekelja's son Mike. When Bekelja moved to Solon, Ohio, he asked Carry's mother if he could take him with him and become his legal guardian, and she agreed. In sixth grade, Carry was a top player, with a highlight video garnering thousands of views on YouTube. He attended Solon High School, and broke a growth plate in his hand his freshman season, subsequently dealing with bone chips in his knees. Carry averaged 19.4 points per game and helped Solon reach the District title game and finish 18–8. He earned first team All-Ohio Division I Northeast District and second team All-Cleveland Metro honors. As a senior, Carry averaged 23.3 points, eight assists, and seven rebounds per game, leading Solon to a 27–2 record and the Ohio High School Athletics Association Division I state championship game. He was named to the first team all-state and was a finalist for Ohio Mr. Basketball. Carry initially committed to playing college basketball for Division II West Liberty, the only school to offer a scholarship, but ultimately committed to Duquesne after getting a late offer.

== College career ==
In his second career game, Carry scored a season-high 32 points and had eight assists in a 89–88 overtime win against UIC. He averaged 12.1 points, 5.8 assists, 3.6 rebounds and 2.4 steals per game as a freshman. Carry garnered Atlantic 10 All-Rookie Team honors. Coming into his sophomore season, he switched his jersey number to 10 to honor his friend Khalil Hopson, who was killed in May 2019 at the age of 24. As a sophomore, Carry averaged 12.2 points, 5.3 assists and 3.9 rebounds per game. He played in five games as a junior averaging nine points per game, but decided to transfer in January 2021. According to Duquesne coach Keith Dambrot, Carry's decision to leave was not because of playing time issues but rather unhappiness with the program. He ultimately opted to move to Kent State. Carry transformed his playing style from a pass-first point guard to Kent State's primary scoring option, but struggled at times with his shooting. On February 22, 2022, he scored a career-high 42 points in a 93–82 win against Ball State. As a redshirt junior, Carry was named MAC Player of the Year. As a redshirt junior, he averaged 17.9 points, 4.8 assists and 4.5 rebounds per game. On April 7, 2022, Carry declared for the 2022 NBA draft while maintaining his college eligibility. On June 1, 2022, Carry withdrew from the NBA Draft to return to Kent State for his senior year. He averaged 17.5 points, 4.8 assists and 1.7 steals per game as a senior and repeated on the First Team All-MAC.

== Professional career ==
After going undrafted in the 2023 NBA draft, Carry joined the Memphis Hustle after being selected in the second round of the G League draft. However, he was waived on November 8. Carry subsequently joined Iraklis BC and averaged 11.4 points, 3.8 rebounds, and 2.6 rebounds per game. On August 8, 2024, he signed with Phoenix Hagen of the ProA. Carry averaged 16.1 points, 4.3 rebounds, 4.6 assists and 1.2 steals per game. On September 6, 2025, he signed with HKK Siroki.

On June 27, 2026, Carry signed with the Calgary Surge of the CEBL. On August 16, Carry signed with AEL Limassol B.C. of the Cyprus Basket League.

== Career statistics ==
Legend
GP	Games played	GS	Games started	MPG	Minutes per game
FG%	Field goal percentage	3P%	3-point field goal percentage	FT%	Free throw percentage
RPG	Rebounds per game	APG	Assists per game	SPG	Steals per game
BPG	Blocks per game	PPG	Points per game	**Bold**	Career high

=== College ===
Year	Team	GP	GS	MPG	FG%	3P%	FT%	RPG	APG	SPG	BPG	PPG
2018–19	Duquesne	28	28	33.5	**.434**	.315	.718	3.6	**5.8**	**2.4**	**.2**	12.1
2019–20	Duquesne	30	30	35.6	.411	.336	.750	3.9	5.3	.9	.1	12.2
2020–21	Duquesne	5	5	30.2	.368	.333	.522	**4.8**	4.2	1.6	.0	9.0
2021–22	Kent State	**34**	**33**	**36.6**	.431	**.353**	**.785**	4.5	4.8	1.4	**.2**	**17.9**
Career		97	96	35.1	.424	.339	.742	4.1	5.2	1.5	.2	14.0
