= 2019–20 NCAA Division I men's basketball rankings =

- Season: 2019–20
- NCAA Tournament: 2020
- Preseason No. 1: Michigan State
NCAA Division I men's basketball rankings
| |

Two human polls made up the 2019–20 NCAA Division I men's basketball rankings, the AP Poll and the Coaches Poll, in addition to various publications' preseason polls. Due to the COVID-19 pandemic, the season ended March 12, 2020. As a result, the NCAA did not bestow a national championship. Instead, that title was de facto bestowed by one or more different polling agencies. There were two main weekly polls that began in the preseason—the AP Poll and the Coaches' Poll.

Kansas, while having not officially made a claim, finished first in both polls. While the program recognised the Helms Athletic Foundation mythical national championship rankings for the 1921-22 and 1922-23 seasons as national championships, this team has yet to be recognised.

== Legend ==
| | Increase in ranking |
| | Decrease in ranking |
| | New to rankings from previous week |
| Italics | Number of first place votes |
| (#–#) | Win–loss record |
| т | Tied with team above or below also with this symbol |

== AP Poll ==
| | Preseason Oct 21 | Week 2 Nov 11 | Week 3 Nov 18 | Week 4 Nov 25 | Week 5 Dec 2 | Week 6 Dec 9 | Week 7 Dec 16 | Week 8 Dec. 23 | Week 9 Dec. 30 | Week 10 Jan. 6 | Week 11 Jan. 13 | Week 12 Jan. 20 | Week 13 Jan. 27 | Week 14 Feb. 3 | Week 15 Feb. 10 | Week 16 Feb. 17 | Week 17 Feb. 24 | Week 18 Mar. 2 | Week 19 Mar. 9 | Week 20 Mar. 18 | |
|---|---|---|---|---|---|---|---|---|---|---|---|---|---|---|---|---|---|---|---|---|---|
| 1. | Michigan State (60) | Kentucky (2–0) (64) | Duke (4–0) (52) | Duke (6–0) (53) | Louisville (7–0) (48) | Louisville (9–0) (55) | Kansas (9–1) (47) | Gonzaga (13–1) (54) | Gonzaga (13–1) (63) | Gonzaga (16–1) (54) | Gonzaga (18–1) (54) | Baylor (15–1) (33) | Baylor (17–1) (44) | Baylor (19–1) (49) | Baylor (21–1) (48) | Baylor (23–1) (48) | Kansas (24–3) (49) | Kansas (26–3) (64) | Kansas (65) (28–3) | Kansas (63) (28–3) | 1. |
| 2. | Kentucky (2) | Duke (2–0) | Louisville (4–0) (8) | Louisville (6–0) (7) | Kansas (6–1) (3) | Kansas (7–1) (4) | Gonzaga (11–1) (15) | Ohio State (11–1) (9) | Duke (11–1) (1) | Duke (13–1) (9) | Baylor (13–1) | Gonzaga (20–1) (31) | Gonzaga (21–1) (19) | Gonzaga (23–1) (15) | Gonzaga (25–1) (15) | Gonzaga (26–1) (14) | Baylor (24–2) (2) | Gonzaga (29–2) | Gonzaga (29–2) | Gonzaga (1) (31–2) | 2. |
| 3. | Kansas (3) | Michigan State (1–1) | Michigan State (2–1) (4) | Michigan State (3–1) (4) | Maryland (8–0) | Ohio State (9–0) (5) | Louisville (10–1) (1) | Louisville (11–1) (1) | Kansas (10–2) (1) | Kansas (11–2) (2) | Duke (15–1) | Kansas (14–3) (1) | Kansas (16–3) (1) | Kansas (18–3) (1) | Kansas (20–3) (1) | Kansas (22–3) (1) | Gonzaga (27–2) | Dayton (27–2) | Dayton (29–2) | Dayton (1) (29–2) | 3. |
| 4. | Duke | Louisville (2–0) (1) | Kansas (2–1) | Kansas (3–1) | Michigan (7–0) (9) | Maryland (10–0) | Duke (9–1) (2) | Duke (10–1) (1) | Oregon (11–2) | Baylor (11–1) | Auburn (15–0) | San Diego State (19–0) | San Diego State (21–0) | San Diego State (23–0) | San Diego State (24–0) | San Diego State (26–0) | Dayton (25–2) | Baylor (25–3) | Florida State (26–5) | Florida State (26–5) | 4. |
| 5. | Louisville | Kansas (1–1) | North Carolina (3–0) | Maryland (5–0) | Virginia (7–0) (5) | Michigan (9–1) | Ohio State (9–1) | Kansas (9–2) | Ohio State (11–2) | Auburn (13–0) | Butler (15–1) | Florida State (16–2) | Florida State (17–2) | Louisville (19–3) | Louisville (21–3) | Dayton (23–2) | San Diego State (26–1) | San Diego State (28–1) | Baylor (26–4) | Baylor (26–4) | 5. |
| 6. | Florida | North Carolina (2–0) | Maryland (3–0) | North Carolina (4–0) | Ohio State (7–0) | Gonzaga (10–1) | Kentucky (8–1) | Oregon (10–2) | Baylor (9–1) | Butler (14–1) | Kansas (12–3) | Louisville (15–3) | Louisville (15–3) | Dayton (20–2) | Dayton (21–2) | Duke (22–3) | Florida State (23–4) | Kentucky (24–5) | San Diego State (30–2) | San Diego State (30–2) | 6. |
| 7. | Maryland | Maryland (2–0) | Virginia (3–0) (1) | Virginia (6–0) (1) | North Carolina (6–1) | Duke (9–1) | Maryland (10–1) | Baylor (9–1) | Louisville (11–2) | San Diego State (15–0) | San Diego State (17–0) | Dayton (16–2) | Dayton (18–2) | Duke (18–3) | Duke (20–3) | Maryland (21–4) | Duke (23–4) | Florida State (24–5) | Creighton (24–7) | Creighton (24–7) | 7. |
| 8. | Gonzaga | Gonzaga (2–0) | Gonzaga (4–0) | Gonzaga (6–0) | Kentucky (6–1) | Kentucky (7–1) | Oregon (8–2) | Auburn (11–0) | Auburn (12–0) | Michigan State (12–3) | Oregon (14–3) | Duke (15–3) | Villanova (16–3) | Florida State (18–3) | Florida State (20–3) | Florida State (21–4) | Kentucky (22–5) | Seton Hall (21–7) | Kentucky (25–6) | Kentucky (25–6) | 8. |
| 9. | North Carolina | Virginia (2–0) | Kentucky (2–1) | Kentucky (5–1) | Gonzaga (8–1) | Virginia (8–1) | Virginia (9–1) | Memphis (10–1) | Memphis (9–2) | Oregon (12–3) | Florida State (14–2) | Villanova (14–3) | Duke (16–3) | Maryland (17–4) | Maryland (19–4) | Penn State (20–5) | Maryland (22–5) | Maryland (23–6) | Michigan State (22–9) | Michigan State (22–9) | 9. |
| 10. | Villanova | Villanova (2–0) | Ohio State (3–0) | Ohio State (5–0) | Duke (7–1) | Oregon (7–2) | Baylor (8–1) | Villanova (9–2) | Villanova (9–2) | Florida State (13–2) | Kentucky (12–3) | Seton Hall (14–4) | Seton Hall (15–4) | Villanova (17–4) | Seton Hall (18–5) | Kentucky (20–5) | Creighton (22–6) | Louisville (24–6) | Duke (25–6) | Villanova (24–7) | 10. |
| 11. | Virginia | Texas Tech (2–0) | Oregon (4–0) | Oregon (5–0) | Michigan State (5–2) | Baylor (7–1) | Memphis (9–1) | Michigan (9–3) | Butler (12–1) | Ohio State (11–3) | Louisville (13–3) | Michigan State (14–4) | Oregon (17–4) | Auburn (19–2) | Auburn (21–2) | Louisville (21–5) | Louisville (23–5) | Creighton (22–7) | Villanova (24–7) | Duke (25–6) | 11. |
| 12. | Seton Hall | Seton Hall (2–0) | Texas Tech (3–0) | Texas Tech (5–0) | Arizona (9–0) | Auburn (8–0) | Auburn (9–0) | Butler (11–1) | Michigan (10–3) | Maryland (12–2) | West Virginia (13–2) | Oregon (15–4) | West Virginia (16–3) | Seton Hall (16–5) | Kentucky (18–5) | Villanova (19–6) | Villanova (21–6) | Duke (23–6) | Maryland (24–7) | Maryland (24–7) | 12. |
| 13. | Texas Tech | Memphis (2–0) | Seton Hall (3–1) | Seton Hall (4–1) | Oregon (6–2) | Memphis (8–1) | Dayton (8–1) | Maryland (10–2) | San Diego State (13–0) | Louisville (11–3) | Dayton (14–2) | Butler (15–3) | Kentucky (15–4) | West Virginia (17–4) | Penn State (18–5) | Auburn (22–3) | Seton Hall (20–7) | Oregon (22–7) | Oregon (24–7) | Oregon (24–7) | 13. |
| 14. | Memphis | Oregon (2–0) | Arizona (4–0) | Arizona (6–0) | Auburn (7–0) | Dayton (7–1) | Michigan (8–3) | Michigan State (9–3) | Michigan State (10–3) | Kentucky (10–3) | Villanova (12–3) | West Virginia (14–3) | Michigan State (15–5) | Oregon (18–5) | West Virginia (18–5) | Oregon (20–6) | Oregon (21–7) | Villanova (22–7) | BYU (24–7) | Louisville (24–7) | 14. |
| 15. | Oregon | Florida (1–1) | Utah State (4–0) | Utah State (7–0) | Memphis (6–1) | Arizona (9–1) | Michigan State (7–3) | San Diego State (12–0) | Maryland (11–2) | Dayton (13–2) | Michigan State (13–4) | Kentucky (13–4) | Maryland (16–4) | Kentucky (16–5) | Villanova (17–6) | Creighton (20–6) | Auburn (23–4) | BYU (24–7) | Louisville (24–7) | Seton Hall (21–9) | 15. |
| 16. | Baylor | Ohio State (2–0) | Memphis (3–1) | Memphis (5–1) | Seton Hall (6–2) | Michigan State (6–3) | Arizona (10–2) | Virginia (9–2) | West Virginia (11–1) | Villanova (10–3) | Wichita State (15–1) | Auburn (16–2) | Butler (16–4) | Michigan State (16–6) | Colorado (19–5) | Seton Hall (18–7) | Penn State (20–7) | Michigan State (20–9) | Seton Hall (21–9) | Virginia (23–7) | 16. |
| 17. | Utah State | Utah State (2–0) | Villanova (2–1) | Tennessee (4–0) | Florida State (7–1) | North Carolina (6–3) | Butler (10–1) | Florida State (10–2) | Kentucky (9–3) | West Virginia (11–2) | Maryland (13–3) | Maryland (14–4) | Auburn (17–2) | Iowa (16–6) | Oregon (18–6) | West Virginia (18–7) | BYU (23–7) | Auburn (24–5) | Virginia (23–7) | Wisconsin (21–10) | 17. |
| 18. | Ohio State | Saint Mary's (2–0) | Xavier (4–0) | Auburn (5–0) | Baylor (5–1) | Butler (9–0) | Villanova (8–2) | Dayton (9–2) | Florida State (11–2) | Virginia (11–2) | Seton Hall (12–4) | Texas Tech (12–5) | Iowa (14–5) | LSU (17–4) | Marquette (17–6) | Colorado (20–6) | Iowa (19–8) | Iowa (20–9) | Wisconsin (21–10) | BYU (24–8) | 18. |
| 19. | Xavier | Arizona (2–0) | Auburn (4–0) | Baylor (5–1) | Dayton (5–1) | Tennessee (7–1) | Florida State (8–2) | Kentucky (8–3) | Virginia (10–2) | Michigan (10–4) | Michigan (11–5) | Iowa (13–5) | Illinois (15–5) | Butler (17–5) | Butler (18–6) | Marquette (17–7) | Michigan (18–9) | Ohio State (20–9) | Ohio State (21–10) | Ohio State (21–10) | 19. |
| 20. | Saint Mary's | Washington (1–0) | Tennessee (3–0) | VCU (5–0) | Colorado (6–0) | Villanova (7–2) | San Diego State (10–0) | Penn State (10–2) | Dayton (10–2) | Penn State (12–2) | Colorado (13–3) | Memphis (14–3) | Colorado (16–4) | Illinois (16–6) | Houston (19–5) | Iowa (18–8) | West Virginia (19–8) | Penn State (21–8) | Auburn (25–6) | Auburn (25–6) | 20. |
| 21. | Arizona | Xavier (2–0) | VCU (4–0) | Colorado (4–0) | Tennessee (6–1) | Florida State (8–2) | Tennessee (7–2) | Washington (9–2) | Penn State (11–2) | Memphis (12–2) | Ohio State (11–5) | Illinois (13–5) | Houston (16–4) | Creighton (17–5) | Iowa (17–7) | Butler (19–7) | Colorado (21–7) | Houston (22–7) | Illinois (21–10) | Illinois (21–10) | 21. |
| 22. | LSU | Auburn (2–0) | Texas (4–0) | Villanova (4–2) | Washington (5–1) | Seton Hall (6–3) | Washington (7–2) | West Virginia (10–1) | Texas Tech (9–3) | Texas Tech (10–3) | Memphis (13–3) | Arizona (13–5) | LSU (15–4) | Penn State (16–5) | Illinois (16–7) | Houston (20–6) | Texas Tech (18–9) | Virginia (21–7) | West Virginia (21–10)т | Houston (23–8) | 22. |
| 23. | Purdue | LSU (1–0) | Colorado (2–0) | Washington (5–1) | Villanova (5–2) | Xavier (9–1) | Penn State (9–2) | Texas Tech (8–3) | Iowa (10–3) | Wichita State (13–1) | Texas Tech (10–5) | Colorado (14–4) | Wichita State (17–3) | Arizona (15–6) | Creighton (18–6) | BYU (21–7) | Ohio State (18–9) | Illinois (20–9) | Houston (23–8)т | Butler (22–9) | 23. |
| 24. | Auburn | Baylor (1–1) | Baylor (2–1) | Florida (5–2) | Butler (7–0) | Colorado (7–1) | Texas Tech (6–3) | Arizona (10–3) | Wichita State (11–1) | Arizona (11–3) | Illinois (12–5) | Rutgers (14–4) | Penn State (14–5) | Colorado (17–5) | Texas Tech (15–8) | Arizona (18–7) | Michigan State (18–9) | Wisconsin (19–10) | Butler (22–9) | West Virginia (21–10) | 24. |
| 25. | VCU | Colorado (1–0) | Washington (2–1) | Xavier (6–1) | Utah State (7–1) | San Diego State (10–0) | West Virginia (9–1) | Iowa (9–3) | Arizona (10–3) | Colorado (12–3) | Creighton (13–4) | Houston (14–4) | Rutgers (15–5) | Houston (17–5) | LSU (17–6) | Ohio State (17–8) | Houston (21–7) | Michigan (18–11) | Iowa (20–11) | Iowa (20–11) | 25. |
| | Preseason Oct 21 | Week 2 Nov 11 | Week 3 Nov 18 | Week 4 Nov 25 | Week 5 Dec 2 | Week 6 Dec 9 | Week 7 Dec 16 | Week 8 Dec. 23 | Week 9 Dec. 30 | Week 10 Jan. 6 | Week 11 Jan. 13 | Week 12 Jan. 20 | Week 13 Jan. 27 | Week 14 Feb. 3 | Week 15 Feb. 10 | Week 16 Feb. 17 | Week 17 Feb. 24 | Week 18 Mar. 2 | Week 19 Mar. 9 | Week 20 Mar. 18 | |
| | | Dropped: Purdue (1–1); VCU (2–0) | Dropped: Florida (2–2); Saint Mary's (3–1); LSU (1–1) | Dropped: Texas (5–1) | Dropped: Texas Tech (5–2); VCU (6–1); Florida (6–2); Xavier (7–1) | Dropped: Utah State (9–1); Washington (7–2) | Dropped: North Carolina (6–4); Seton Hall (6–4); Xavier (9–2); Colorado (8–2) | Dropped: Tennessee (7–2) | Dropped: Washington (10–3) | Dropped: Iowa (10–4) | Dropped: Virginia (11-4); Penn State (12-4); Arizona (11–5) | Dropped: Wichita State (15-3); Michigan (11-6); Ohio State (12-6); Creighton (14–5) | Dropped: Texas Tech (12–7); Memphis (14–5); Arizona (13–6) | Dropped: Wichita State (17–4); Rutgers (16–6) | Dropped: Michigan State (16–8); Arizona (16–7) | Dropped: Illinois (16–9); Texas Tech (16–9); LSU (18–7) | Dropped: Marquette (17–9); Butler (19–9); Arizona (19–8) | Dropped: West Virginia (19–10); Colorado (21–9); Texas Tech (18–11) | Dropped: Penn State (21–10); Michigan (19–12) | None | |

== USA Today Coaches Poll ==
The Coaches Poll is the second oldest poll still in use after the AP Poll. It is compiled by a rotating group of 31 college Division I head coaches. The Poll operates by Borda count. Each voting member ranks teams from 1 to 25. Each team then receives points for their ranking in reverse order: Number 1 earns 25 points, number 2 earns 24 points, and so forth. The points are then combined and the team with the highest points is then ranked No. 1; second highest is ranked No. 2 and so forth. Only the top 25 teams with points are ranked, with teams receiving first place votes noted the quantity next to their name. The maximum points a single team can earn is 775.

| | Preseason Oct 24 | Week 2 Nov. 18 | Week 3 Nov. 25 | Week 4 Dec. 2 | Week 5 Dec. 9 | Week 6 Dec. 16 | Week 7 Dec. 23 | Week 8 Dec. 30 | Week 9 Jan. 6 | Week 10 Jan. 13 | Week 11 Jan. 20 | Week 12 Jan. 27 | Week 13 Feb. 3 | Week 14 Feb. 10 | Week 15 Feb. 17 | Week 16 Feb. 24 | Week 17 Mar. 2 | Week 18 Mar. 9 | Week 19 Mar. 16 | |
|---|---|---|---|---|---|---|---|---|---|---|---|---|---|---|---|---|---|---|---|---|
| 1. | Michigan State (30) | Duke (4–0) (25) | Duke (6–0) (27) | Louisville (7–0) (25) | Louisville (9–0) (28) | Kansas (9–1) (25) | Gonzaga (13–1) (23) | Gonzaga (13–1) (30) | Gonzaga (16–1) (27) | Gonzaga (18–1) (16) | Gonzaga (20–1) (19) | Baylor (17–1) (15) | Baylor (19–1) (20) | Baylor (21–1) (19) | Baylor (21) (23–1) | Kansas (30) (24–3) | Kansas (32) (26–3) | Kansas (32) (28–3) | Kansas (29) (28–3) | 1. |
| 2. | Kentucky | Louisville (4–0) (1) | Louisville (6–0) (1) | Virginia (7–0) (2) | Ohio State (9–0) (2) | Gonzaga (11–1) (4) | Ohio State (11–1) (7) | Duke (11–1) (1) | Duke (13–1) (4) | Baylor (13–1) (10) | Baylor (15–1) (13) | Gonzaga (21–1) (17) | Gonzaga (23–1) (12) | Gonzaga (25–1) (13) | Gonzaga (11) (26–1) | Baylor (2) (24–2) | Gonzaga (29–2) | Gonzaga (29–2) | Gonzaga (3) (31–2) | 2. |
| 3. | Kansas (1) | Michigan State (2–1) (4) | Michigan State (3–1) (1) | Kansas (6–1) (1) | Kansas (7–1) | Duke (9–1) (2) | Duke (10–1) | Kansas (10–2) (1) | Kansas (11–2) (1) | Duke (15–1) (6) | Kansas (14–3) | Kansas (16–3) | Kansas (18–3) | Kansas (20–3) | Kansas (22–3) | Dayton (25–2) | Dayton (27–2) | Dayton (29–2) | Dayton (29–2) | 3. |
| 4. | Duke (1) | North Carolina (3–0) | North Carolina (4–0) | Maryland (8–0) (2) | Maryland (10–0) (1) | Ohio State (9–1) (1) | Louisville (11–1) (2) | Baylor (9–1) | Baylor (11–1) | Auburn (15–0) | San Diego State (19–0) | San Diego State (21–0) | San Diego State (23–0) | San Diego State (24–0) | San Diego State (26–0) | Gonzaga (27–2) | Baylor (25–3) | Florida State (26–5) | Baylor (26–4) | 4. |
| 5. | Louisville | Kansas (2–1) (1) | Kansas (3–1) | Michigan (7–0) (1) | Duke (9–1) | Louisville (9–1) | Kansas (9–2) | Ohio State (11–2) | Auburn (13–0) | Butler (15–1) | Louisville (15–3) | Louisville (17–3) | Louisville (19–3) | Louisville (21–3) | Dayton (23–2) | San Diego State (26–1) | San Diego State (28–1) | Baylor (26–4) | Florida State (26–5) | 5. |
| 6. | Florida | Virginia (3–0) | Virginia (6–0) | Ohio State (7–0) (1) | Gonzaga (10–1) | Kentucky (8–1) | Baylor (9–1) | Oregon (11–2) | Butler (14–1) | San Diego State (17–0) | Florida State (16–2) | Florida State (17–2) | Dayton (20–2) | Dayton (21–2) | Duke (22–3) | Florida State (23–4) | Kentucky (24–5) | San Diego State (30–2) | San Diego State (30–2) | 6. |
| 7. | Gonzaga | Maryland (4–0) (1) | Gonzaga (6–0) | North Carolina (6–1) | Michigan (8–1) | Virginia (8–1) | Oregon (10–2) | Auburn (12–0) | San Diego State (15–0) | Kansas (12–3) | Dayton (16–2) | Dayton (18–2) | Duke (18–3) | Duke (20–3) | Maryland (21–4) | Duke (23–4) | Seton Hall (21–7) | Kentucky (25–6) | Kentucky (25–6) | 7. |
| 8. | Maryland | Gonzaga (4–0) | Maryland (5–0) (1) | Duke (7–1) | Virginia (8–1) | Maryland (10–1) | Auburn (11–0) | Louisville (11–2) | Michigan State (12–3) | Oregon (14–3) | Duke (15–3) | Duke (16–3) | Florida State (18–3) | Florida State (20–3) | Florida State (21–4) | Maryland (22–5) | Florida State (24–5) | Villanova (24–7) | Duke (25–6) | 8. |
| 9. | Virginia | Ohio State (3–0) | Ohio State (5–0) (1) | Gonzaga (8–1) | Kentucky (7–1) | Auburn (9–0) | Villanova (9–2) | Villanova (9–2) | Oregon (12–3) | Florida State (14–2) | Michigan State (14–4) | Seton Hall (15–4) | Maryland (17–4) | Maryland (19–4) | Penn State (20–5) | Kentucky (22–5) | Maryland (23–6) | Creighton (24–7) | Creighton (24–7)т | 9. |
| 10. | Villanova | Kentucky (2–1) | Oregon (5–0) | Kentucky (6–1) | Auburn (8–0) | Oregon (8–2) | Memphis (10–1) | Butler (12–1) | Florida State (13–2) | Louisville (13–3) | Seton Hall (14–4) | Villanova (16–3) | Auburn (19–2) | Seton Hall (18–5) | Kentucky (20–5) | Louisville (23–5) | Louisville (24–6) | Duke (25–6) | Villanova (24–7)т | 10. |
| 11. | North Carolina | Oregon (4–0) | Kentucky (5–1) | Arizona (9–0) | Baylor (7–1) | Baylor (8–1) | Butler (11–1) | Memphis (11–1) | Louisville (11–3) | Dayton (14–2) | Villanova (14–3) | West Virginia (16–3) | West Virginia (17–4) | Auburn (21–2) | Louisville (21–5) | Creighton (22–6) | Duke (23–6) | Maryland (24–7) | Maryland (24–7) | 11. |
| 12. | Texas Tech | Texas Tech (3–0) | Texas Tech (5–0) | Michigan State (5–2) | Dayton (7–1) | Dayton (8–1) | Maryland (10–2) | San Diego State (13–0) | Ohio State (11–3) | Kentucky (12–3) | Butler (15–3) | Oregon (17–4) | Villanova (17–4) | Kentucky (18–5) | Auburn (22–3) | Villanova (21–6) | Villanova (22–7) | Michigan State (22–9) | Michigan State (22–9) | 12. |
| 13. | Seton Hall | Seton Hall (3–1) | Seton Hall (4–1) | Auburn (7–0) | Oregon (7–2) | Memphis (9–1) | Virginia (9–2) | Michigan (10–3) | Kentucky (10–3) | West Virginia (13–2) | Oregon (15–4) | Kentucky (15–4) | Seton Hall (16–5) | Penn State (18–5) | Villanova (19–6) | Seton Hall (20–7) | Oregon (22–7) | Oregon (24–7) | Louisville (24–7) | 13. |
| 14. | Oregon | Arizona (4–0) | Arizona (6–0) | Oregon (6–2) | Arizona (9–1) | Villanova (8–2) | San Diego State (12–0) | Kentucky (9–3) | Maryland (12–2) | Michigan State (13–4) | Kentucky (13–4) | Michigan State (15–5) | Michigan State (16–6) | West Virginia (18–5) | Seton Hall (18–7) | Penn State (20–7) | Creighton (22–7) | Louisville (24–7) | Oregon (24–7) | 14. |
| 15. | Memphis | Villanova (2–1) | Utah State (7–0) | Seton Hall (6–2) | Michigan State (6–3) | Michigan (8–3) | Michigan (9–3) | Maryland (11–2) | Dayton (13–2) | Villanova (12–3) | West Virginia (14–3) | Maryland (16–4) | Oregon (18–5) | Colorado (19–5) | Creighton (20–6) | Auburn (23–4) | BYU (24–7)т | Seton Hall (21–9) | Seton Hall (21–9) | 15. |
| 16. | Ohio State | Utah State (4–0) | Tennessee (4–0) | Baylor (5–1) | North Carolina (6–3) | Butler (10–1) | Michigan State (9–3) | Michigan State (10–3) | Villanova (10–3) | Wichita State (15–1) | Auburn (15–2) | Auburn (17–2) | Kentucky (16–5) | Villanova (17–6) | Oregon (20–6) | Oregon (21–7) | Auburn (24–5)т | BYU (24–7) | BYU (24–8) | 16. |
| 17. | Arizona | Tennessee (3–0) | Auburn (5–0) | Dayton (5–1) | Tennessee (7–1) | Arizona (10–2) | Florida State (10–2) | West Virginia (11–1) | West Virginia (11–2) | Maryland (13–3) | Maryland (14–4) | Butler (16–4) | Iowa (16–6) | Iowa (17–7) | Colorado (20–6) | Iowa (19–8) | Michigan State (20–9) | Auburn (25–6) | Virginia (23–7) | 17. |
| 18. | Baylor | Auburn (4–0) | Baylor (5–1) | Memphis (6–1) | Memphis (8–1) | Michigan State (7–3) | Dayton (9–2) | Dayton (10–2) | Virginia (11–2) | Seton Hall (12–4) | Texas Tech (12–5) | Iowa (14–5) | LSU (17–4) | Oregon (18–6) | West Virginia (18–7) | BYU (23–7) | Iowa (20–9) | Virginia (23–7) | Ohio State (21–10) | 18. |
| 19. | Utah State | VCU (4–0) | VCU (5–0) | Florida State (7–1) | Butler (9–0) | Florida State (8–2) | Kentucky (8–3) | Virginia (10–2) | Michigan (10–4) | Ohio State (11–5) | Iowa (13–5) | Illinois (15–5) | Butler (17–5) | Houston (19–5) | Marquette (17–7) | West Virginia (19–8) | Ohio State (20–9) | Wisconsin (21–10) | Wisconsin (21–10) | 19. |
| 20. | Saint Mary's | Memphis (3–1) | Memphis (5–1) | Tennessee (6–1) | Villanova (7–2) | San Diego State (10–0) | Washington (9–2) | Florida State (11–2) | Penn State (11–2) | Michigan (11–5) | Memphis (14–3) | Houston (16–4) | Penn State (16–5) | Butler (18–6) | Iowa (18–8) | Colorado (21–7) | Penn State (21–8) | Ohio State (21–10) | Auburn (25–6) | 20. |
| 21. | Xavier | Xavier (4–0) | Villanova (4–2) | Colorado (6–0) | Florida State (8–2) | Tennessee (7–2) | Penn State (10–2) | Penn State (11–2) | Texas Tech (10–3) | Colorado (13–3) | Arizona (13–5) | Colorado (16–4) | Illinois (16–6) | Creighton (18–6) | Arizona (18–7) | Texas Tech (18–9) | Houston (22–7) | Butler (22–9) | Butler (22–9) | 21. |
| 22. | Purdue | Texas (4–0) | Washington (5–1) | Villanova (5–2) | Seton Hall (6–3) | Washington (7–2) | Texas Tech (8–3) | Texas Tech (9–3) | Memphis (12–2) | Memphis (13–3) | Wichita State (15–3) | Wichita State (17–3) | Creighton (17–5) | Marquette (17–6) | Houston (20–6) | Michigan (18–9) | Virginia (21–7)т | Illinois (21–10) | Illinois (21–10) | 22. |
| 23. | Auburn | Baylor (2–1) | Xavier (6–1) | Washington (5–1) | Colorado (7–1) | North Carolina (6–4) | West Virginia (10–1) | Wichita State (11–1) | Wichita State (13–1) | Texas Tech (10–5) | Illinois (13–5) | Penn State (14–5) | Arizona (15–6) | Illinois (16–7) | Butler (19–7) | Ohio State (18–9) | Illinois (20–9)т | West Virginia (21–10) | Houston (23–8) | 23. |
| 24. | LSU | Washington (2–1) | Colorado (4–0) | Butler (7–0) | San Diego State (10–0) | Penn State (9–2) | Arizona (10–3) | Arizona (10–3) | Arizona (11–3) | Iowa (11–5) | Houston (14–4) | LSU (15–4) | Colorado (17–5) | Texas Tech (15–8) | Ohio State (17–8) | Michigan State (18–9)т | Wisconsin (19–10) | Houston (23–8) | West Virginia (21–10) | 24. |
| 25. | Tennessee | Colorado (2–0) | Florida (5–2) | Oklahoma State (7–0) | Washington (7–2) | VCU (8–2) | Wichita State (10–1) | Iowa (10–3) | Seton Hall (10–4) | Stanford (14–2) | Rutgers (14–4) | Rutgers (15–5) | Houston (17–5) | Michigan State (16–8) | Michigan State (17–9) | Arizona (19–8)т | Butler (20–9) | Iowa (20–11) | Iowa (20–11) | 25. |
| | Preseason Oct 24 | Week 2 Nov. 18 | Week 3 Nov. 25 | Week 4 Dec. 2 | Week 5 Dec. 9 | Week 6 Dec. 16 | Week 7 Dec. 23 | Week 8 Dec. 30 | Week 9 Jan. 6 | Week 10 Jan. 13 | Week 11 Jan. 20 | Week 12 Jan. 27 | Week 13 Feb. 3 | Week 14 Feb. 10 | Week 15 Feb. 17 | Week 16 Feb. 24 | Week 17 Mar. 2 | Week 18 Mar. 9 | Week 19 Mar. 16 | |
| | | Dropped: Florida (2–2); St Mary's (3–1); Purdue (2–2); LSU (1–1) | Dropped: Texas (5–1) | Dropped: Texas Tech (5–2); Utah State (7–1); VCU (6–2); Xavier (7–1); Florida (6–2) | Dropped: Oklahoma State (7–2) | Dropped: Seton Hall (6–4); Colorado (8–2) | Dropped: Tennessee (8–3); North Carolina (7–5); VCU (9–2) | Dropped: Washington (10–3) | Dropped: Iowa (10–4) | Dropped: Virginia (11–4); Penn State (12–4); Arizona (11–5) | Dropped: Ohio State (12–6); Michigan (11–6); Colorado (14–5); Stanford (15–3) | Dropped: Texas Tech (12–7); Memphis (14–5); Arizona (13–6) | Dropped: Wichita State (17–4); Rutgers (16–6) | Dropped: LSU (17–6); Arizona(16–7) | Dropped: No. 23 Illinois; No. 24 Texas Tech | Dropped: No. 19 Marquette; No. 22 Houston; No. 23 Butler | Dropped: No. 19 West Virginia; No. 20 Colorado; No. 21 Texas Tech; No. 22 Michigan; No. 24 Arizona | Dropped: No. 20 Penn State | None | |

== See also ==
2019–20 NCAA Division I women's basketball rankings
