= Brevard Public Schools =

School district in Florida, United States

Address
- 2700 Judge Fran Jamieson Way Viera, Florida, 32940-6601; United States
- Coordinates: 28°14′53.60″N 80°44′9.64″W

District information
- Superintendent: Tara Harris
- NCES District ID: 1200150
- Enrollment: 74,000 (2015)

Other information
- Website: www.brevardschools.org

Brevard Public Schools is a school district serving Brevard County, Florida, and based in Viera, Florida.

In 2015, the district had about 74,000 students. 24% attend a school other than the one to which they are assigned. In 2009, the school board was Brevard's largest local government employer with 9,500 workers of whom 5,000 are teachers. After Mark Rendell's resignation, the interim superintendent of schools is Tara Harris

== School Board ==
Board members run as non-partisan.
District 1 - Megan Wright
District 2 - Gene Trent
District 3 - John Thomas
District 4 - Matthew Susin
District 5 - Katye Campbell

The budget for 2008-9 was about $1 billion. Roughly half is operating; about half is capital outlay. Board members were paid $35,000 annually in 2011.

In 2010, there were 7,000 students whose parents were employed by the federal government which pays no local real estate taxes. The budget is fairly dependent on real estate taxes. As a result, the federal government contributes money through the Federal Impact Aid program by way of compensation. However, in 2010, the amount had dropped from an expected $43 million to $5 million due to cuts in the federal budget.

In 2011, $232 million was budgeted for teachers' salaries.

== History ==
The 1892–93 school year there were 27 schools in Mosquito County. It was the forerunner for Brevard, Indian River, St. Lucie, Okeechobee, Osceola and Lake Counties. The twenty-one schools were: LaGrange, Titusville, Titusville (Colored), City Point, Shiverville, Rockledge, Eau Gallie, Sanders (Merritt Island), Says (Merritt Island), Martin (Merritt Island), Melbourne, Ten Mile Creek (St. Lucie), Lake view (Osceola), Prairie View (Osceola), Willis (Osceola), Crab Grass (Osceola), Bassiville (Lake), Taylor (Okeechobee), Bassinger (Okeechobee), Ft. Drum (Okeechobee), Drum Creek (Okeechobe).

Each school was a "one room" schoolhouse with one teacher. Part of the teachers pay was based on daily attendance. Teachers pay was $1.00 a month.

Clifton Colored School was built around 1890 in north Merritt Island where students were taught trades such as carpentry, concert and masonry and agriculture. It was the second colored school in the county. It later became Monroe High.

Disparities existed between black and white schools including teacher salaries. The first attempt in Florida to change this system occurred in 1938 when the NAACP brought suit in Brevard.

In 1964, the school board initiated a "freedom of choice" allowing blacks to voluntarily attend white schools. Resulting integration was insufficient.

In 1966, there were three black high schools including Gibson High, Titusville, Monroe High in Cocoa, and Stone High, Melbourne. These were all closed with integration in 1968.

In 1966, Brevard was brought under federal jurisdiction for the purpose of desegregation. It was released from federal control in 1978 when this was achieved.

About 1967, the school district was split into three administrative units, North, Middle and South, each with its own assistant superintendent.

There were race riots in Rockledge and Melbourne high schools during the period of integration from 1969 to 1972.

In 2002, the district elected its first black member to the school board.

In 2007, the school board voted to borrow nearly 3/4 of a billion dollars for maintenance and future expansion. By a majority of one, the Board believed that it could do this without raising taxes because of the increasing tax base.

In 2007, the Florida Department of Education announced that Brevard's graduation rate was the highest in the state at 92.1%. However, there is a major discrepancy between the way the state measures student graduation (tracks each student) and the way the federal government does (quantity entering, quantity graduating). So the figure by national standards is much lower. Using federal guidelines, the graduation rate for the class of 2005, was 69.3%, the highest in the state, but below the national average of 70.6%. The school district was first or second in the state for graduation rates from 2001 through 2009.

The budget for 2007-8 was about $1.2 billion. This was the highest in its history.

In 2005, there were 75,235 students. The count reached an all-time high of 76,062 in the 2006–07 school year. The count was 72,519 in 2009.

In 2010, with the end of the shuttle program and the subsequent loss of jobs in the area, officials have been concerned that a quarter of the schools would fall below 70% enrollment capacity.

In 2011, six public schools were ranked by the state in the top ten schools in the state, out of 2,800 There was one list each for primary and secondary schools.

In 2013, the school board voted to close three schools, Clearlake Middle School, Gardendale Elementary Magnet School, and South Lake Elementary School prompting a large public outcry. The school board proposed the closings and limited public input by holding required public meetings during the 2012 holiday season. The board did not hold any of the required meetings with the capital outlay committee as required by an interlocal agreement with several municipalities. The Brevard Board of County Commissioners, City of Cocoa, and City of Titusville condemned the decision in official letters sent to Superintendent Brian Bingelli and the board. The Board of County Commissioners voted to file a lawsuit against the school board 3–2, however a minimum of 4 votes were required to initiate the lawsuit per county ordinance. In March 2013, a group of parents and community leaders initiated a lawsuit against the board, claiming a racial bias in the decision to close the three schools. The Board of County Commissioners publicly supported the lawsuit and started a dispute resolution process as well on their own behalf. A political action committee (PAC) was formed to oppose the current school board members in future elections and vowed to effect a change in leadership.

In 2014, Moody's Investors Service and Fitch gave the county good marks on its management affecting predictability of cash flow. Moody's commented that the board's leaders gave consistently made accurate and conservative cash flow assumptions. Fitch praised the board's sound operations. An editorial in the local paper demurred, saying that the board should not have cut taxes earlier. It believed the tax cut led directly to requesting from the voters a raise in the sales tax in the county one-half of a percent.

In 2015, the school board selected its first black superintendent.

School must be held for a state-established minimum number of days. It was closed three days for Hurricane Matthew in 2016. It did not have to make these days up because of teacher instruction days built into the calendar. School was closed 7 days for Hurricane Irma in 2017. It will not have to make those up by longer attendance in the spring, for the same reason.

In November 2026, superintendent Mark Rendell resigned, making Tara Harris interim superintendent.

== Administration ==
28 different individuals served in the position of superintendent from 1874 to 2018. William Sharpe was the first. The 3 longest serving superintendents were John Sams, at twenty-seven 27 years (1882-1909); Damon Hutzler (1937-1952) and Woodrow Darden (1952-1966), each serving consecutive 14 years. There has only been one 1 African American to serve as superintendent, Desmond Blackburn (2015–2018). There has never been a female to serve in the position prior to Tara Harris becoming interim superintendent in 2026.

The superintendent's office was located in Titusville, the county seat. It is now located in Viera.

The district contains 72,519 public school students in 82 schools.

Students must pass a standardized test, the FSA, to graduate from high school. To avoid surprises, students are given practice tests and are tested several times before they reach 12th grade.

To comply with state testing rules, the 2011–12 school year will start August 10. The semester will end December 21. The second semester will start January 9 and conclude May 25.

The district is split for administrative reasons into four "areas" which tend to have east and west lines in the narrow county which extends 72 miles (116 km) north and south. The areas are numbered I-IV, each having its own assistant superintendent.

To get hands-on learning experience about science, the local environment and math, all fourth-graders are given a one-day field trip to the Indian River Lagoon, one of the most diverse estuaries in North America.

The county is the first and only county in the state to have its school health program operated by a county health department and paid for by the school district. It has won several national awards. On an average day, 2,400 students receive nursing care including 1,260 doses of medicine. Nurses typically work seven-hour shifts, 70 hours bi-weekly. There are 107 health care professionals employed. Services are available to all students, public or private.

Einstein Montessori, a private school in Brevard County, was previously a charter school. Explorer Elementary and Middle Charter, Osprey Elementary, and Sawgrass Middle were closed by the school board.

=== Budget ===
The last time the public approved a school building bond was in 1963. To circumvent the need for public approval for borrowing, both the county and the school district have used certificates of participation. In 2005, the board decided to build seven new schools to accommodate the 800 to 1,300 new students moving into the area annually, and renovate each of the districts schools. This would also help meet the requirement that was imposed when Florida voters approved a constitutional amendment limiting class size, starting in 2010, but phased in before then by the Florida Legislature.

The school district borrowed a total of $643 million, mostly between 2004 and 2008. Annual payments on the debt in 2012 were $38.4 million. At the same time the housing bubble burst. Property values, on which school taxes were based, dropped from $41 billion in 2008 to $27 billion in 2011.

At the same time, the cost of construction materials rose. Estimates to renovate Titusville High School, for example, went from $22 million to $43 million.

After the collapse of property values, the district sought to save money by deferring maintenance. For example, instead of replacing each of its 409 buses every 12 years, it went to a 55-year replacement cycle.

After the voters rejected a 1/2 cent increase in local sales tax to benefit schools, the district decided to close four schools. It also decided to pay fines and exceed class size limitations when necessary to balance the budget.

In 2013, the schools retained their financial rating of AA− and Aa3 by Fitch Group and Moody's.

In 2011, the average teacher earned $44,442 annually, not including benefits. A starting teacher earns $36,000. Top salary was $56,350 after 21 years.

In 2011, there was a pool of 1,900 substitute teachers. Using substitutes when required, cost $4.2 million in 2009–10.

In 2012, an average principal received $93,000 in salary and benefits annually; a school secretary, $40,000; cafeteria manager, $33,000. The average stipend for middle-school department heads averaged $9,176. The average school office phone bill was $9,317. Estimates of savings for closing four elementary and middle schools to save money was $3.8 million.

=== Class ranking and GPA ===
Brevard County's system for high school class rankings is based around "state-weighted GPA." This system as practiced by Brevard County Schools actually does not refer to any specific state standard, leading to controversy over how rankings are determined. It has been suggested that the policy of awarding weight to Advanced Placement (AP) and dual enrollment programs actually handicaps the students taking the more challenging AP courses, especially in the district's two block-scheduled high schools, since in a block-scheduled program students receive AP credit and weight for only half to three-quarters of the course. The weights are equal in name and course code, in accordance with Florida State Statute.

=== Transportation ===
In 2014, 350 school buses drove 25,000 students to and from school each day. There were 7.700 places where the buses stop. The buses collectively drove 7,000,000 miles (11,000,000 km) annually.

=== Dress code ===
The school board dress code requires lower garments, including pants and skirts, be worn at the waist and prohibits undergarments from being visible. Shorts must "cover the buttocks." All lower garments must fit the student. Depending on the school, students that violate the code can be denied entry to class, be referred to the Dean for discipline and suspended from school.

In 2008, the district won a case, Danielle Bar-Navon v. School Bd. of Brevard County, which questioned the school's legal right to limit body piercings as a First Amendment expression. The United States Court of Appeals for the Eleventh Circuit confirmed the District Court's decision.

== Recognition ==
Brevard has been in the top ten school districts in the state in each of the 22 areas of assessment on the standard statewide exams given students each year.

1999: The high school graduation rate had risen to 92% from 64%.

2005: The superintendent of schools was selected as best in state by his peers. The students had higher SAT scores than any other Florida school district. The district has a higher percentage (9%) of National Board Certified Teachers than any of the other largest ten districts in the state. In 2010, the system stood 11th in the nation for total number of NBCT teachers, 672.

In 2004-2005, third graders tested in the top ten school districts in the state (out of 67), and the School District placed third in the state for overall academic performance. It also placed third in the state for number of National Board Certified teachers. Brevard was first in Florida in the number of A-rated schools in the 10 largest districts, and second overall. Brevard led the state in science in fifth and eleventh grade assessments and was second in the eighth grade. The four-year graduation rate was the second highest in Florida. 2000 students were held back in 2004–05, the majority in 3rd, 9th and 10th grades. This is 38% fewer than the prior year. A program targets weak students. The school bus fleet trade publication named the Brevard County School Bus System among the top ten in North America. AARP ranked the school district No. 8 on the list of Best Employers for Workers Over 50. It was the only public-school system and the highest-ranked Florida employer on the national list

2006: The superintendent of Brevard Public Schools was named the music administrator of the year by the Florida Music Educators' Association. Fifteen schools were selected as Music Demonstration Schools. State officials encourage other districts to send their staff to these schools for insight into establishing or improving solid music programs. The district had 5 of the top 10 elementary schools in the state, according to the Florida Department of Education. Tenth graders led the state in the writing exam.

2007: The school district was recognized as a Governor's Sterling Award Winner. A team consisting of Brevard high school students stood second in the robotics world championship. The state has ranked 15 of the elementary schools as tops in the state including a Title I South Lake, a former D-ranked school. Brevard leads the state in the number of high school students dual enrolled in secondary and college courses. The district had the tenth most nationally certified teachers of all school districts in the country - 566. It ranked third in the country for the percentage of teachers so certified - 11.%. However, a state study was unable to detect any correlation between teacher certification and student performance.

In 2008, the state recognized Brevard as having the best graduation rate.

In 2009, county public schools won 30% of the available soccer state championships.

As of 2009, the state has designated 25 schools in the state as "Music Demonstration Schools." Thus far, 22 of these were Brevard public schools.

In 2010, 3/4 of all students at Saturn Elementary were receiving subsidized meals, considered the most dependable predictor of low performance. It had experienced a 45% mobility rate; this means that almost half its students move away or show up during the year. The school scored in the top 15% of all schools in Florida for proficiency in math, science and reading. Students in first through sixth grade are in the computer laboratory daily.

In 2011, the Center for American Progress evaluated Brevard as one of the top three large school districts in the state for "return on investment."

=== Athletics ===
Up to the end of 2011, boy's public school basketball teams had won four state championships. One in 2004 by Cocoa Beach High School, two by Cocoa High School in 1960 and 2009, and Cocoa Monroe High School in 1965. They have won 13 state football championships, 11 soccer championships, and 16 cross-country. Girls teams have won six basketball championships.

== Programs ==
In 2012, Brevard had five "choice" schools: Freedom 7 Elementary School, Robert Louis Stevenson Elementary School, West Melbourne Elementary School for Science, Edgewood Jr./Sr. High School, and West Shore Jr./Sr. High School. Students gain entry to these schools based on a lottery system and are required to be on grade level to apply. For the 2018–2019 school year, an additional choice school, South Lake Elementary in Titusville, is being added.

Besides choice and "magnet" schools, Brevard also has nine charter elementary schools and one planned charter secondary school.

Another, in Cocoa Beach offers an International Baccalaureate Diploma program. This is a rigorous pre-university course of study, leading to internationally standardized examinations. The program is designed as a comprehensive two-year curriculum that allows its graduates to fulfill requirements of many different nations' education systems. As with the AP and dual enrollment programs, students completing IB courses and exams were eligible for postsecondary education credit. In 2005 and 2006, Newsweek ranked Cocoa Beach High School among the top 100 US high schools (out of 21,000) in part due to its International Baccalaureate program.

Brevard has a magnet high school program, the Academy of Business and Finance, in Melbourne.

Brevard has started an Engineering magnet program known as Bayside Engineering and Technology Academy (BETA) Bayside High School includes the ENCORE Performing and Technical Arts Academy, focusing on the performing arts and the technical side of artistic endeavors.

14 low-performing elementary schools were required to allow their students to select $1000+ of free tutoring from a vendor. Parents were exposed to these vendors at an education fair to help choose which one.

Schools start in early August, the 8th in 2005. This is to ensure that the semester is over by the December holidays.

The Brevard County School system attempted to serve nutritional food to children in 2005 that would address the rising obesity issue while still maintaining appeal. In 2009, 5 million lunches were served.

Through a program called Make It Take It, disadvantaged students at two Brevard Public Schools learned how to build computers that they'll get to take home.

The JROTC program in 12 high school enrolled 1,479 students in 2008.

In 2009, the district had nine high school robotic teams out of 16 potential high schools. First stated that the district had more student participation and teams than almost any other district in the country.

in 2009, 3,168 students took 5,601 Advanced Placement exams. 58.4% scored 3 or better.

== Controversy ==
After one 2004 outdoor graduation was drenched, the school board moved ceremonies in 2005 to Calvary Chapel, at half the cost of the outdoor facility. An atheist and Buddhist parent took the board to federal court, where the judge allowed the locale, but ordered them to change in 2006.

== Race relations ==
Prior to 1964, the district maintained segregated schools for white students and black students, using the legal doctrine of separate but equal education established in the Plessy v. Ferguson case of 1896. Although the federal courts overturned Plessy and mandated that schools be integrated in Brown v. Board of Education in 1954, the school district did not integrate until 1964. African-American children attended Melbourne Vocational School from the time it was built in 1921 until it burned in 1953. For five years they met in the abandoned hospital of the Naval Air Station, until 1958, when Stone High School was opened. When the schools were integrated in 1964, the former Stone campus continued to be used as Stone Middle School.

In 1964, a federal lawsuit forced integration. The suit was dismissed without prejudice in 1976. As of 2007, of the 67 public school districts in Florida, Brevard is one of 18 that have unitary status, meaning that de facto segregation exists, but is not the result of state-sponsored discrimination while 16 remained under federal court jurisdiction. Since 1964 various schools including Stone Middle, Palm Bay High School and others as magnet schools and later MSAP and STEAM themed schools as part of voluntary desegregation programs.

In 2012, about 33% of suspensions in Brevard Public Schools were given to black students, who constitute 15% of the student population. The Northern Brevard chapter of the NAACP filed a complaint with the US Department of Education's Office for Civil Rights. A spokesperson for the school system responded that this type of apparent inequity is not unique to Brevard. Nationally, one in every six black students is suspended compared to one in 20 white students. The complaint stated that six principals were black, out of 86 schools; and that black teachers were infrequently hired.

== Schools ==
In 2009, there were 86 public schools in the county.

Prior to 2010, all schools were guaranteed sports budgets of $70,000 for high schools, $50,000 for middle schools, $75,000 for junion/senior high combination, and $45,000 for choice high schools. The school district made up the money that the school didn't raise. Budget cuts have prevented assistance of any sort since.

=== Elementary schools ===
In 2007, third graders stood first in statewide reading and math tests out of the ten largest school districts. Overall, they stood 11 out of 67 school districts.

- Allen, Roy Elementary
- Andersen, Hans Christian Elementary
- Apollo Elementary
- Atlantis Elementary
- Audubon Elementary
- Cambridge Elementary
- Cape View Elementary
- Carroll, Lewis Elementary
- Challenger 7 Elementary
- Columbia Elementary
- Coquina Elementary
- Creel, Dr. W. J. Elementary
- Croton Elementary
- Discovery Elementary
- Endeavour Elementary
- Enterprise Elementary
- Fairglen Elementary
- Freedom 7 Elementary. Ranked third in the state, by the state in 2011.
- Gardendale Elementary
- Gemini Elementary
- Golfview Elementary
- Harbor City Elementary
- Holland, Spessard L. Elementary
- Imperial Estates Elementary
- Indialantic Elementary. Ranked ninth in the state, by the state in 2011.
- Jupiter Elementary
- Lockmar Elementary
- Longleaf Elementary
- Manatee Elementary
- McAuliffe, Christa Elementary
- Meadowlane Primary
- Meadowlane Intermediate
- Mila Elementary
- Mims Elementary
- Oak Park Elementary
- Ocean Breeze Elementary
- Palm Bay Elementary
- Pinewood Elementary
- Port Malabar Elementary
- Quest Elementary
- Riviera Elementary
- Roosevelt, Theodore Elementary
- Sabal Elementary
- Saturn Elementary
- Sea Park Elementary
- Sherwood Elementary
- South Lake Elementary
- Stevenson, Robert Lewis Elementary. In 2011, all fourth grade students achieved at least a 4 out of 6 on the FCAT statewide writing assessment test, the only school in Brevard to do so and only one of eleven in the state.
- Sunrise Elementary
- Suntree Elementary
- Surfside Elementary
- Tropical Elementary
- Turner, John F., SR. Elementary
- University Park Elementary
- Viera Elementary
- West Melbourne School for Science. Ranked number one in the state, by the state in 2011.
- Westside Elementary
- Williams, Ralph M., JR. Elementary

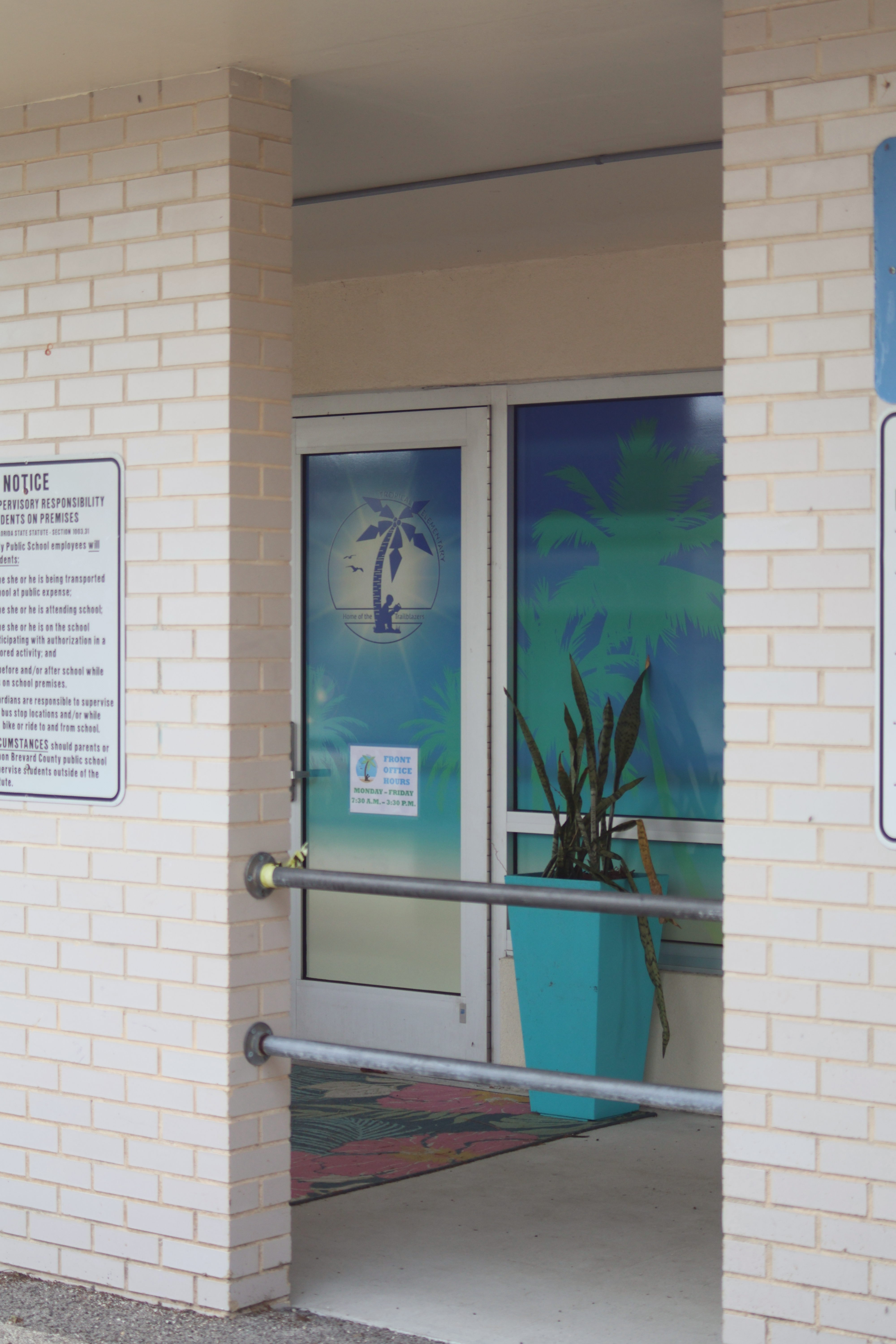
Tropical Elementary in Merritt Island.

=== Middle schools ===
In 2009, it was estimated that middle schools sports and intramural programs cost the county $236,000. This was the cost of coaches' stipends.

The following is a listing of public middle schools in the county:

- Central Middle
- Cocoa Beach Jr./Sr. High. Ranked seventh in the state, by the state in 2011.
- Cocoa High School
- DeLaura Middle
- Edgewood Jr./Sr. High. Ranked third in the state, by the state in 2011.
- Hoover, Herbert C. Middle
- Jackson, Andrew Middle
- Jefferson, Thomas Middle
- Johnson, L.B. Middle
- Kennedy, John F. Middle
- Madison, James Middle
- McNair, Ronald Middle
- Southwest Middle
- Space Coast Jr./Sr. High
- Stone Middle
- West Shore Junior – Senior High School. Ranked second in the state, by the state in 2011.

=== High schools ===
Ninth grade sports were estimated to cost $373,000 in 2009. Junior Varsity sports cost $167,000. These figures represent coaches stipends. The schools claim to have preeminent sports teams, particularly in football.

The following is a list of all public high schools in the county:

- Astronaut High School (Eagle)
- Bayside High School
- Cocoa Beach Jr./Sr. H
- Cocoa High School
- Eau Gallie High School
- Edgewood Junior/Senior High School
- Heritage High School
- Melbourne High School
- Merritt Island High School (Mustang)
- Palm Bay High School - Has Academy of Law and Justice, enrolling 300 students.
- Rockledge High School
- Satellite High School
- Space Coast Jr./Sr. High School
- Titusville High School
- Viera High School
- West Shore Junior – Senior High School

High schools compete athletically as part of the Cape Coast Conference.

Renaming streets after bordering high school's mascots is traditional in Brevard County.

=== Charter schools ===
The following are charter schools and academies in the county:

- Campus Charter School
- Emma Jewel Charter Academy
- Educational Horizons Charter School
- Imagine Schools at West Melbourne
- Oakwood Academy Charter (Merged with Royal Palm Charter)
- Odyssey Charter School
- Odyssey Preparatory Academy
- Palm Bay Academy Charter
- Pineapple Cove Classical Academy
- Royal Palm Charter
- Sculptor Charter School
- Viera Charter School

=== Adult education ===
- Central Area Adult at Clearlake Education Center
- North Area Adult at South Lake Education Center
- Palm Bay High Adult/Community Ed
- South Area Adult Education

=== Alternative Learning Centers ===
- Central Area Alternative Learning Center
- North Area Alternative Learning Center
- South Area Alternative Learning Center

== Superintendents ==
1. John Sams c. 1888, Brevard's first superintendent of schools.
2. B. Frank Brown 1967?-1969?
3. Wayne White 1969-1972
4. Lloyd Soughers 1985?-1988
5. Abe Collinsworth 1988-1993
6. David Sawyer 1993-1999?
7. Richard DiPatri c. 2000–2009. He was the longest serving appointed superintendent in Florida history.
8. Brian Binggeli 2009-2015
9. Desmond Blackburn 2015-2018
10. Mark W. Mullins, Ed.D. 2018–2022
11. Robert Schiller (interim) 2022-2023
12. Susan Hann (acting) 2023
13. Mark Rendell 2023–present

== See also ==
- Education in Brevard County, Florida
