= Heritage High School (Palm Bay, Florida) =

High school in Palm Bay, Florida, United States

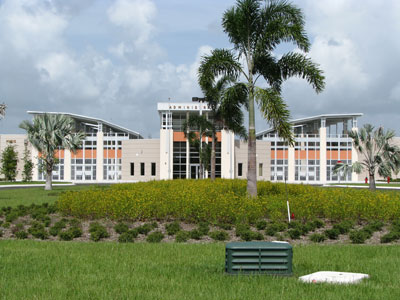

Location
- 2351 Malabar Road NW; Palm Bay, Florida, Brevard County; United States; 28.002245°N 80.743668°W

Information
- Type: High school
- Established: August 2009
- School district: Brevard Public Schools
- Principal: Stephen Link
- Faculty: Arthur Ulmer (athletic director)
- Teaching staff: 85.00 (FTE)
- Grades: 9-12
- Enrollment: 2,023 (2023-2024)
- Student to teacher ratio: 23.80
- Colors: █ ██ blue, black, and white
- Mascot: Panther
- Website: Heritage HS website

Heritage High School is a high school in Palm Bay, Florida run by Brevard Public Schools. It is the 16th school in the district. The school is located on 65 acres (26 ha) of land with a student capacity of 2,384.

== History ==
The budget to construct the school was $80 million. Heritage High opened August 10, 2009, with 9th and 10th grade students. In 2010, 11th grade was added. In August 2011, the school officially became a high school with 9-12 grade with its first Senior class graduating in 2012. It drew students from Bayside High School, Palm Bay High School, and Melbourne High School.

== Sports ==
Heritage teams compete in the Cape Coast Conference as the Panthers. The school colors are blue, black, and white.

Sports available for enrolled students include: basketball, football, soccer, baseball, softball, swimming, wrestling, track and field, and volleyball.

== Activities ==
Student activities include:

- YEARBOOK
- JROTC
- Academy of Environmental Studies
- Automotive Service Technology
- Cambridge AICE
- Sports Medicine Academy
- Band
- Chorus
- Orchestra
- Dance/Step team

== Clubs ==
- Chess Club
- Video game club
- Green Youth
- HOSA
- FBLA
- Sources Of Strength
- Black Student Union
- Student Government Association
- WPNN
- Fellowship of Christian Athletes
- Book Club
- Art Club
- Model-UN

== Notable alumni ==
- Cochise (born 1998), rapper
- Demetres Samuel, college football cornerback and wide receiver
- Jacob Toppin (born 2000), basketball forward in the Israeli Basketball Premier League, formerly in the NBA
- Obi Toppin (born 1998), NBA forward for the Indiana Pacers
