= Toni Pressley =

American soccer player and coach (born 1990)

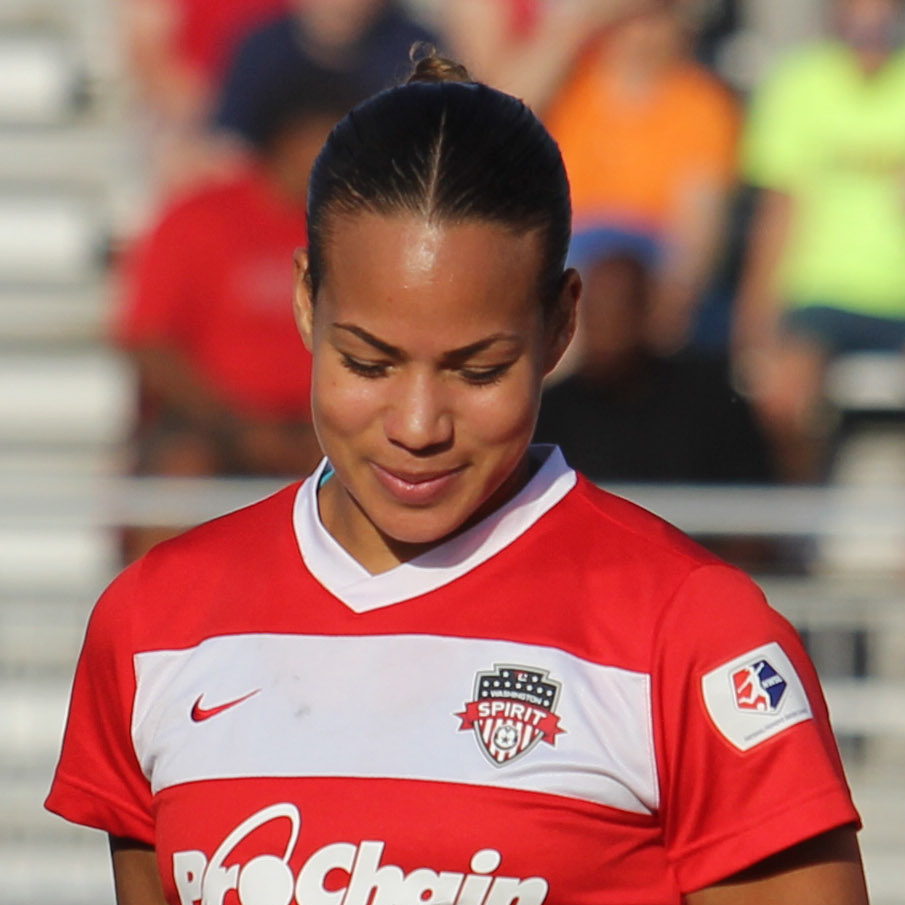
- Pressley with Washington Spirit in 2013

Personal information
- Full name: Toni Deion Pressley
- Date of birth: February 19, 1990 (age 36)
- Place of birth: Melbourne, Florida, U.S.
- Height: 5 ft 11 in (1.80 m)
- Position: Defender

Team information
- Current team: Breiðablik

Youth career
- Lions Soccer Club
- Space Coast United
- West Shore High School

College career
Years	Team	Apps	(Gls)
2008–2011	Florida State Seminoles	96	(11)

Senior career*
Years	Team	Apps	(Gls)
2008	Boston Renegades	5	(0)
2009	Washington Freedom		
2012	Western New York Flash		
2012	Ryazan VDV	20	(1)
2013–2014	Washington Spirit	17	(0)
2015	Western New York Flash	1	(0)
2015	Houston Dash	15	(0)
2016–2022	Orlando Pride	81	(4)
2017–2018	→ Canberra United (loan)	12	(2)
2023	Breiðablik	19	(0)
2025	Afturelding	0	(0)

International career^{‡}
2006	United States U17		
2007–2008	United States U18		
2010	United States U20	19	
2013	United States U23		

Managerial career
- 2019–2024: Lake Highland Highlanders (JV boys)
- 2024–2025: Afturelding (assistant)
- 2025–: United States U18
- * Club domestic league appearances and goals as of January 16, 2025 ‡ National team caps and goals as of February 16, 2013

Toni Deion Pressley (born February 19, 1990) is an American professional soccer player who plays as a defender for Afturelding in the Icelandic Besta deild kvenna. She previously played for the Orlando Pride, Western New York Flash and Washington Spirit of the NWSL, Ryazan VDV in the Russian Women's Football Championship league, the top division of women's soccer in Russia. Pressley played for various United States national youth teams and was a member of the United States women's national under-23 soccer team.

== Early life ==
Toni attended West Shore Junior – Senior High School where she was team captain as a senior, leading the team to the Class 3A Regional finals. In 2007, she earned a spot on the NSCAA/adidas Youth All-America Team and received first team All-Space Coast honors. As a senior in 2008, she was named Parade All-American and a top 50 recruit by Soccer Buzz. Pressley also competed on the track and field team at West Shore, winning a district and regional championship in 2005 as a member of 4 × 100 m relay as well as the 2007 district championship in the shot put.

Pressley was also an Olympic Development Program Region III pool member for three years from 2006 to 2008 and was the leading scorer in the Region III league in 2006 and 2007. She was a member of the Florida Olympic Development Program team in 2006 and 2007. Pressley also played for local club team, Space Coast United.

=== Florida State University, 2008–2011 ===
Pressley attended Florida State University majoring in criminology and playing defender and forward for the Seminoles from 2008 to 2011. She finished her collegiate career tied for third in game appearances with 96. As a freshman, she was named to the All-ACC Second Team.

She was named Atlantic Coast Conference Player of the Week after "game-winning heroics" in a match against University of Florida.

Pressley was a Hermann Trophy Watch List candidate in 2010 and 2011. In 2010, she was named Soccer America MVP: First-Team All-American, TopDrawerSoccer.com Team of the Season – Third Team, NSCAA All-American Fourth Team, and All-ACC First Team. She also earned NSCAA Southeast Region First Team honors and was ranked number 41 on the Top Drawer National Top 100 Women the same year. In 2011, she was named to the NSCAA All-American Third Team and ACC All-Tournament Team.

== Club career ==
=== W-League: Boston Renegades and Washington Freedom Futures, 2008–2011 ===
Pressley played with the Boston Renegades of the W-League during the summer of 2008. She made five appearances with the team for a total of 167 minutes.

Pressley played for the Washington Freedom Futures of the W-League from 2009 to 2010. She made eight appearances for a total of 693 minutes and provided one assist.

=== Drafted to Philadelphia Independence, 2012 ===
Pressley was selected in the second round (13th overall) of the 2012 WPS Draft by the Philadelphia Independence; however, the league folded before the season began.

=== Western New York Flash, 2012 ===
In 2012, she played for Western New York Flash in the WPSL Elite, as center-back. Pressley helped the Flash win the league championship after scoring an equalizer in the last minute of stoppage time. Teammate Angela Salem scored the deciding penalty kick to give Western New York the WPSL Elite championship, defeating the Chicago Red Stars 4–2 on penalty kicks after the teams finished tied 1–1 at the end of 120 minutes.

=== Ryazan VDV, 2012–2013 ===
Pressley played for Ryazan VDV in Russia during the 2012–2013 season.

=== Washington Spirit, 2013–2014 ===
Pressley signed with the Washington Spirit in the National Women's Soccer League in June 2013. She made her debut for the club on June 15, 2013, during a match against her former club, the Western New York Flash.

=== Western New York Flash and Houston Dash, 2015 ===
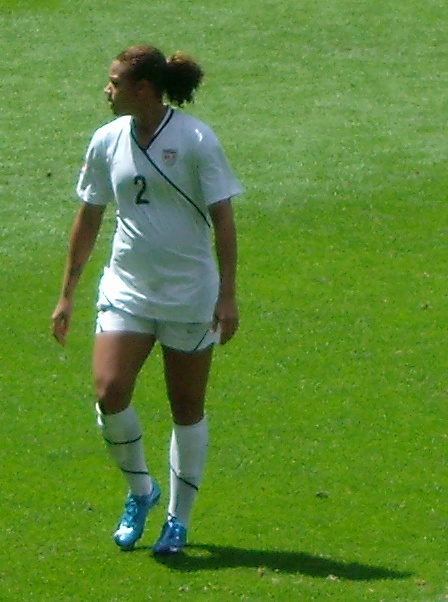
Pressley at the 2010 FIFA U-20 Women's World Cup

In February 2015, it was announced that Pressley had been traded to the Western New York Flash for the 2015 season. In April, she started and played a full ninety minutes during the team's season opener against the Seattle Reign FC which resulted in a 5–1 defeat. The following month, she was traded to the Houston Dash in exchange for midfielder Ashley Nick.

=== Orlando Pride, 2016–2022 ===
On November 2, 2015, Pressley was selected by Orlando Pride in the 2015 NWSL Expansion Draft. On October 12, 2019, after undergoing surgery for breast cancer in August, Pressley appeared in the Pride's final game of the season. She signed a one-year contract extension with an option for an additional year in January 2021. At the end of the 2022 season, Pressley was extended a new contract offer but did not appear on the team's opening preseason roster.

==== Loan to Canberra United, 2017–2018 ====
In October 2017, Pressley joined Australian club Canberra United for the 2017–18 W-League season.

=== Breiðablik ===
In March 2023, Pressley signed a one-year contract with Breiðablik of the Icelandic Besta deild kvenna.

== International career ==
Pressley has represented the United States on various youth national youth teams including the under-17, under-18, under-20, and under-23 teams.

Pressley was a member of the under-20 team that captured gold at the CONCACAF Qualifier thus earning an automatic berth in the FIFA World Cup. She played every minute of every game in the tournament as a member of the team's defensive line and tallied an assist in a 5–0 victory over Switzerland. The United States reached the quarter-finals of the 2010 FIFA U-20 Women's World Cup in Germany. In June 2011, Pressley participated with the U-23 team at the Three Nations Tournament in Falun, Sweden, from June 12–22, 2011.

Pressley competed for the United States women's national under-23 soccer team and won the Four Nations tournament in La Manga Club, Spain.

== Personal life ==
In August 2019, Pressley began treatment for breast cancer.

In January 2021, Pressley announced her engagement to Orlando Pride teammate Marta Vieira da Silva. The engagement was later called off.

Pressley is a vegan and self-described animal lover. She says veganism has helped her become a better athlete. She released a cookbook featuring plant-based recipes in 2023 titled, Girls Gone Veg, with her former Orlando Pride teammate Ali Riley.
