= HSCT =

HSCT can refer to:

- Hematopoietic stem cell transplantation, a medical procedure involving transplantation of bone marrow or other blood-forming cells
- High Speed Civil Transport, a NASA project to develop a supersonic passenger aircraft
- High School Competency Test, a standardized test previously used by high schools in Florida
