= Stone High School =

Stone High School may refer to:

- Old Frankfort Stone High School, (closed 1974) in Franklin, Indiana
- Stone High School (Florida), (closed) an all-black school in Melbourne, Florida
- Thomas Stone High School, in Waldorf, Maryland
- Stone High School (Mississippi) in Wiggins, Mississippi
- Stone Memorial High School, in Crossville, Tennessee
