= Edgewood Junior/Senior High School =

Edgewood Junior-Senior High School

Location
- 180 East Merritt Avenue; Merritt Island, Florida; United States; 28°21′44″N 80°41′46″W

Information
- Type: Public
- School district: Brevard Public Schools
- NCES School ID: 120015000119
- Principal: Jacqueline Ingratta
- Teaching staff: 50.00 (on FTE basis)
- Grades: 7 to 12
- Enrollment: 935 (2023-2024)
- Student to teacher ratio: 18.70
- Colors: Black and red
- Athletics conference: Cape Coast Conference
- Mascot: Red Wolves
- Accreditation: Blue Ribbon
- Website: brevardschools.org/o/ejrsrh

Edgewood Junior-Senior High School, more often called Edgewood, is a secondary school located at 180 East Merritt Avenue in Merritt Island, Florida, USA. Edgewood enrolls students from grades seven through twelve. It is part of the Brevard Public Schools System. It was the second "School of Choice" in Brevard County. The school has been in operation since 1960, first as Edgewood Middle School, then Edgewood Junior High and now as Edgewood Junior/Senior High School.

In 2008 U.S. News & World Report included Edgewood in the "Best" category among the nation's high schools, only one of two in Brevard County to be listed, and the school was ranked 43 out of 21,069 in the country. In 2009, the school was rated as the 54th best high school in the country by U.S. News & World Report.

In the 2020–2021 school year there were 934 students, 82 faculty and staff, and 3 administrators. In the same school year the school underwent a mascot change. There were several levels of voting that allowed people to suggest mascots and then vote for the new mascot. The top options were presented to the student government and the Wolves were chosen. Another survey was given to students to decide whether it should be Wolves or Red Wolves. Red Wolves was the final decision.

== School of Choice ==
High school students are required to earn a Diploma of Distinction. To earn the diploma students are required to have 4 English credits at honours level or higher, 4 Mathematics credits at honours level or higher, 4 Science credits at honours level or higher, 4 Social Studies credits at honours level or higher, 3 World Language credits in one language at honours level or higher, freshman Career Research and Decision Making, 1 performing/fine art credit, a senior project an accompanying research course, Unweighted GPA on the 2.0 to 4.0 scale, Algebra 1 Honours in middle school, at least 2 AP or Dual enrollment courses, completed 25 service learning hours annually, at least 1 leadership experience, and no F grades on their transcripts.

== Recognition ==
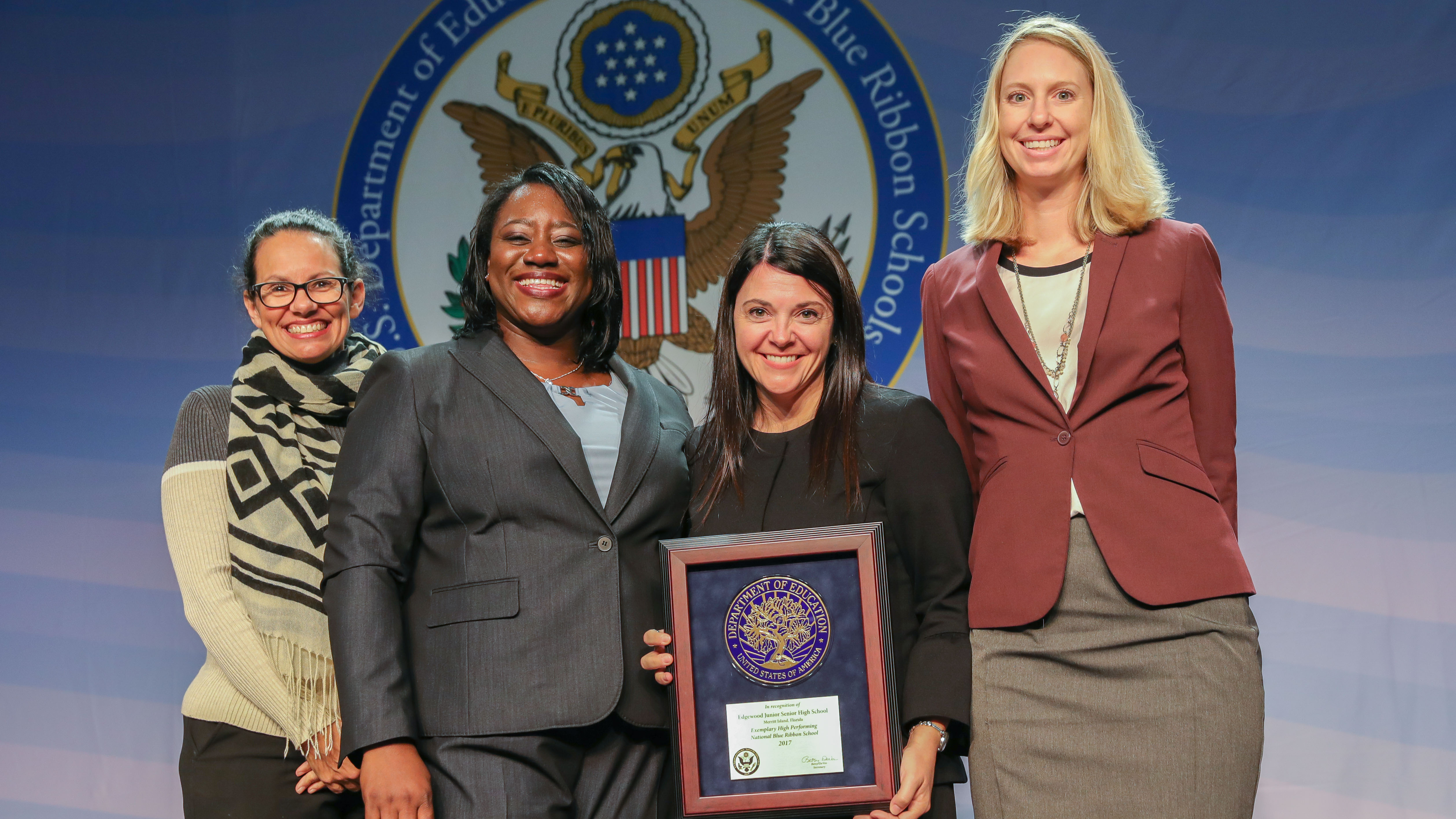
2017 National Blue Ribbon Schools Winner

Edgewood was named a Blue Ribbon School by the US Department of Education in 2008-2009, 2017, and in 2023. The school scored the highest in the county on the 2009 state writing test. The school was ranked 73 out of 21,069 in the country. Criteria were scoring high in state exams for both majority and minority students, and Advanced Placement testing including wide participation. In 2008, the school, using state criteria, was tied with one other school in the county for having a 100% graduation rate. Eighth grade students achieved the highest scores in the county on the 2008 FCAT essay test, at 4.80, which tied with one other school. In 2024, the school had nine National Merit Scholarship semi-finalists.
