= Eau Gallie High School =

Location
- 1400 Commodore Boulevard; Melbourne, Florida; United States; 28°7′49.33″N 80°38′49.77″W

Information
- Type: Public
- Motto: Anchor Down
- Established: 1923 (Pineapple); 1963 (Commodore Blvd)
- Principal: Keith Barton
- Faculty: 75.00 (FTE)
- Grades: 9-12
- Enrollment: 1,490 (2023–2024)
- Student to teacher ratio: 19.87
- Colors: Navy, gold, and red
- Mascot: Commodore
- Information: (321)242-6400
- Website: EG High School website

Eau Gallie High School is located at 1400 Commodore Blvd in the Eau Gallie area of Melbourne, Florida. It is one of four public high schools in Melbourne, along with Melbourne High School, Palm Bay High School, and West Shore Junior/Senior High School.

In sports the school was previously classified as 6A, the largest classification based on enrollment, but it is now 3A.

In 2010, the school graduated 384. Seven of the students simultaneously received Associate of Arts degrees from being co-enrolled in the local community college .

In 2010, Florida Today described the school: "predominately serves children of the working middle class."

== History ==
The original school was located in the former city of Eau Gallie, overlooking the Indian River. The successor school is 3.5 miles (5.6 km) west.

Construction on the new Eau Gallie High School began in 1963. Students from the new building graduated in 1964. During the construction Eau Gallie High Students attended a split session at Melbourne High School.

The school had the lowest reportable incidents of any high school in Brevard for the 2006–7 school year. The school uses surveillance cameras to monitor student activity.

== Academics ==
In 2009, 80% of students graduating went on to some form of higher education. 32% went to a four-year college, 48% to Eastern Florida State College.

In the 2009–2010 academic year, Eau Gallie was the only high school in the state to be classified as a national demonstration school for Advancement Via Individual Determination. This is a program that encourages middling students to aim for higher education at the four year university level and provides them the tools and advice needed to achieve that goal.

== Student body ==
In 2010, one-fourth of the seniors came from low-income families.

== Recognition ==
- In 2011, the Air Force Junior Reserve Officer Training Corps won first place in the AFJROTC academic bowl. They competed in Washington, D.C., against hundreds of other teams after winning the state competition.
- Girls fast pitch softball won the state championship 2011.
- From 2004 to 2008, the local Technology Student Association, won four years in a row at the state conference.
- Softball team rated during the season as number two in the nation in the USA Today high school softball poll 2007-8
- In 2007, the school Board awarded bonuses to sixty-nine teachers at Eau Gallie out of only 375 awards to the sixteen high schools in the county. This was double the awards to the second highest school.
- In 2007, the Eau Gallie Odyssey of the Mind Team placed first at World Competition for 'The Large and Small of It' Division III.
- In 2009, the Eau Gallie symphonic band went to Carnegie Hall in New York City to perform a 30-minute program as part of the National Band and Orchestra Festival.
- In 2016, the music department was given a distinguished recognition.
- On September 24, 2021, a fight resulting in 2 hospitalisations and 5 arrests occurred prompting changes to the school’s lunch policy.
- On March 17, 2022, the Chamber Orchestra performed at the 2022 ASTA National Orchestra Festival and was declared the High School Grand Champions.
- In 2001, Eau Gallie High Technology Student Association Chapter won 1st place at the National Conference with Justin Lauer setting a national record with three first place finishes in Technological System (Bret Lauer and Justin Lauer), Technical Writing (Justin Lauer), and Construction Challenge (Justin Lauer and Mike Warner).

== Notable alumni ==
- Tom Rapp 1965 - singer-songwriter from psychedelic folk band Pearls Before Swine
- Ariana Madix 2003 - TV personality (Vanderpump Rules) & author
- Tim Wakefield 1984 - Pitcher Pittsburgh Pirates, Boston Red Sox; 2016 inductee into the Boston Red Sox Hall of Fame
- Matt Walters 1998 - Former NFL lineman New York Jets
- Prince Fielder 2002 - Former Professional baseball player
- Carter Stewart 2018 - Professional Baseball Player for the Fukuoka SoftBank Hawks of NPB
- Jareb Dauplaise Actor

== Sports ==
Its primary sports rival is Melbourne High School.

=== Mascot/Colors ===
The mascot is the Commodore. It is believed that the first principal of Eau Gallie High School was a graduate from Vanderbilt University, whose mascot is also the Commodore.

The colors are Navy/Gold/Red.
