= Brian Bollinger =

American football player (born 1968)

No. 77, 71
- Position: Guard

Personal information
- Born: November 21, 1968 (age 57); Indialantic, Florida, U.S.
- Listed height: 6 ft 5 in (1.96 m)
- Listed weight: 285 lb (129 kg)

Career information
- High school: Melbourne (Melbourne, Florida)
- College: North Carolina (1987–1991)
- NFL draft: 1992: 3rd round, 76th overall pick

Career history
- San Francisco 49ers (1992–1993); Arizona Cardinals (1994)*; San Francisco 49ers (1994); Arizona Cardinals (1994); Green Bay Packers (1995)*
- * Offseason or practice squad member only

Awards and highlights
- First-team All-ACC (1991); Second-team All-ACC (1990)

Career NFL statistics
- Games played: 39
- Stats at Pro Football Reference

Brian Reid Bollinger (born November 21, 1968) is an American former professional football player who was an offensive guard for three seasons with the San Francisco 49ers of the National Football League (NFL). He was selected by the San Francisco 49ers in the third round of the 1992 NFL draft after playing college football at the University of North Carolina.

== Early life and college ==
Brian Reid Bollinger was born on November 21, 1968, in Indialantic, Florida. He attended Melbourne High School in Melbourne, Florida.

Bollinger was a member of the North Carolina Tar Heels of the University of North Carolina at Chapel Hill from 1987 to 1991. He was redshirted in 1987 and was a four-year letterman from 1988 to 1991. He was named second-team All-Atlantic Coast Conference (ACC) by the Associated Press (AP) in 1990 and first-team All-ACC by the AP in 1991.

== Professional career ==
Bollinger was selected by the San Francisco 49ers in the third round, with the 76th overall pick, of the 1992 NFL draft. He officially signed with the team on July 16. He played in all 16 games for the 49ers during his rookie year in 1992. He also appeared in two playoff games that season. Bollinger played in all 16 games for the second consecutive season in 1993. He appeared in two playoff games again as well. He was waived by the 49ers on July 21, 1994.

Bollinger was claimed off waivers by the Arizona Cardinals on July 22, 1994. He was waived on August 23, 1994.

He signed with the 49ers again on September 7, 1994. He played in seven games for the 49ers during the 1994 season before being waived again on November 22, 1994.

Bollinger was claimed off waivers by the Cardinals again on November 23, 1994. He did not appear in any games for the Cardinals and became a free agent after the 1994 season.

He signed with the Green Bay Packers on March 17, 1995, but was later waived on August 15, 1995.
