= Demetres Samuel =

American football player (born 2008)

No. 1 – Syracuse Orange
- Position: Cornerback / Wide receiver
- Class: Sophomore

Personal information
- Born: April 2, 2008 (age 18)
- Listed height: 6 ft 1 in (1.85 m)
- Listed weight: 195 lb (88 kg)

Career information
- High school: Heritage (Palm Bay, Florida)
- College: Syracuse (2025–present)

Demetres Samuel Jr. (born April 2, 2008) is an American college football cornerback and wide receiver for the Syracuse Orange.

== Early life ==
Samuel attended Heritage High School, where, as a freshman, he totaled 35 tackles and seven pass deflections. As a sophomore, he recorded 19 tackles and five interceptions, one of which he returned for a touchdown. Coming out of high school, Samuel was rated as a four-star recruit, the 18th overall safety, the 32nd overall player in Florida, and the 207th overall player in the class of 2025. He received offers from schools such as Alabama, Florida, Ole Miss, Texas A&M, Michigan State, Nebraska, Syracuse, Kentucky, and Auburn. Samuel initially committed to play college football for the Syracuse Orange before he switched his commitment to the Florida Gators and eventually flipped back to Syracuse, all within a six-month span.

== College career ==
Heading into his freshman season, he is supposed to start at cornerback, while also playing some wide receiver, as a 17 year old.

Samuel was named by ESPN as one of top 10 incoming freshmen and by On3 as a True Freshman All-American.
