= Deon Broomfield =

American football player and coach (born 1991)

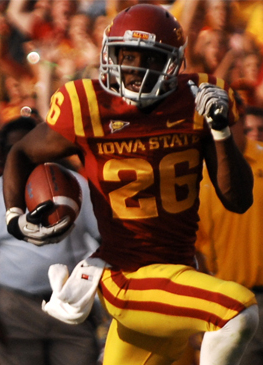
- Broomfield with Iowa State in 2012

Penn State Nittany Lions
- Title: Defensive pass game coordinator & safeties coach

Personal information
- Born: August 3, 1991 (age 35); Melbourne, Florida
- Listed height: 6 ft 0 in (1.83 m)
- Listed weight: 206 lb (93 kg)

Career information
- Position: Safety
- High school: Palm Bay (FL) Bayside
- College: Iowa State
- NFL draft: 2014: undrafted

Career history

Playing
- Buffalo Bills (2014−2015)*
- * Offseason or practice squad member only

Coaching
- Carthage College (2015) Safeties coach; Western Illinois (2016) Cornerbacks coach; Indiana State (2017–2019) Cornerbacks coach; Houston Texans (2020) Defensive assistant; Iowa State (2021–2025) Safeties coach; Penn State (2026–present) Defensive pass game coordinator & safeties coach

Awards and highlights
- ISU Scholar Athlete (2013); Medal of Honor Bowl (2014)
- Stats at Pro Football Reference

Deon Broomfield (born August 3, 1991) is an American former football safety and is currently a secondary coach for Penn State. He played college football at Iowa State.

== High school ==
Broomfield attended Bayside High School in Palm Bay, Florida. As a sophomore, Broomfield helped the Bayside Bears to a 7–3 record and a trip to the playoffs. That year, he was named to the second-team all-district. As a junior, Broomfield recorded 85 tackles, three interceptions, and three fumble recoveries, making the Class 5A second-team all-state. In his senior season, Deon had nine interceptions, caused six fumbles (of which he recovered three), and led his team to the second round of the playoffs, finishing the season at 8–4. He again made the Class 5A second-team all-state, as well as making the first-team all-state coast.

In addition to football, Broomfield was a four-year letterman in track and field and was an honor roll student.

Considered a two-star recruit by Rivals.com, he was given a Rivals Rating of 5.2 He accepted a scholarship offer from Iowa State.

== College career ==
Deon Broomfield redshirted his initial collegiate season in 2009. In 2010 Broomfield played mostly on special teams, playing in all 12 games and coming in second on the team with seven special teams tackles. In his sophomore season, 2011, Deon played in all 13 games and made 23 tackles, including five in an upset win over the No. 2 ranked Oklahoma State Cowboys. In that game Broomfield had a key third-down stop that set up an OSU missed field goal that sent the game into overtime. In 2012 Broomfield played in 13 games, starting six, made 45 tackles, and had two interceptions. In 2013, Broomfield's senior season, he started all 12 games at strong safety, ranked fourth on the team with 57 tackles, third on the team with six pass breakups, and second on the team with two fumble recoveries (both of which he caused). He also had an interception.

Broomfield ended his career at ISU with 133 tackles, 16 pass breakups, four forced fumbles, and three interceptions.

== Professional career ==
Deon was signed as an undrafted free agent by the Buffalo Bills. On June 16, 2015, he was waived/injured by the Bills.

== Coaching career ==
Broomfield coaches safeties in 2015 at Carthage College. In 2016, Broomfield became the cornerbacks coach for Western Illinois. Broomfield was named the cornerbacks coach at Indiana State. On January 31, 2020, Broomfield was hired as a defensive assistant for the Houston Texans of the National Football League (NFL). In 2021 he served as the safeties coach for Iowa State.
