= Palm Bay Magnet High School =

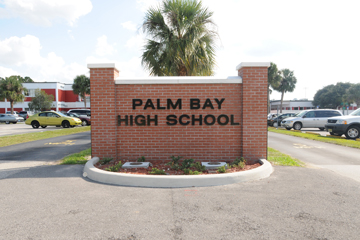

Location
- 101 Pirate Lane; Melbourne, Florida 32901; United States; 28°2′56″N 80°37′8″W

Information
- Type: Public
- Motto: To educate and inspire students for the challenges of today and tomorrow.
- Established: 1960
- Principal: Jud Kaminski
- Staff: 71.00 (FTE)
- Grades: 9-12
- Enrollment: 1,486 (2022–2023)
- Student to teacher ratio: 20.93
- Colors: Black, Red, Silver
- Mascot: Pirate
- Website: Official website

Palm Bay Magnet High School is a public high school located in Melbourne, Florida. It is part of the Brevard County School District.

== History ==
The school originally opened as Southwest Junior High School in 1960, in an area near what is now the Florida Institute of Technology and a historically black neighborhood in the south Melbourne area. At the time, Stone Middle School was serving as a school primarily for black students in the area, serving multiple grades. As desegregation progressed, the schools were re-purposed as Stone became a middle school with white children being bussed in from all neighborhoods south of New Haven Avenue (US 192). Shortly thereafter, Southwest became Palm Bay Senior High. Southwest Middle School was reconstituted within Palm Bay in 1988. Palm Bay Senior High School became Palm Bay Magnet High School at the start of the 2014–2015 school year with the addition of numerous STEAM-based programs funded by federal grants.

There was some controversy regarding the school's chosen graduation venue in 2005, which was an auditorium in a local Calvary Chapel facility which featured a large cross shape carved into the wall behind the stage. A suit was filed in court by the families of two Palm Bay Senior High students, in an attempt to block the usage of the religious facility for a secular public school ceremony in favor of a secular venue. The judge presiding over the case ruled that it was too late to change the venue (and thus that the 2005 graduation ceremony of Palm Bay Senior High School, as well as those of several other local high schools, would proceed as planned in the Calvary Chapel facility), but that in following years the Brevard County public schools would have to find a secular venue for graduation ceremonies.

In 2006–2007, Palm Bay had the highest reported incidence of behavioral offenses within the school district's traditional high schools. This could be due to high reporting standards which could vary among schools.

== Campus ==
The campus consists of several main buildings that house administration and classrooms, as well as a gymnasium and auditorium. During the 2004–2005 school year, the school received a private donation which was used to expand the library. The school created more classrooms within the same building for classes in criminology, law, forensics and other social sciences. The building was renamed to reflect the benefactors and law studies. There are rooms modeled after American courtrooms in which school's law classes perform mock trials. In 2005 the school added a separate law academy.

There are a number of portable classrooms. Campus buildings have hallways that are open to the outside and lockers are outdoors.

== Athletics ==
=== Football ===
The school competes in class 4A within the Florida High School Athletic Association. The school originally shared a field with Melbourne High School, but built its own stadium at a cost of $600,000. The first game played in the new stadium was on September 15, 1989, with Palm Bay beating Eau Gallie High School 45–14. The football team went on to win the state championship in 2000 and 2002. In 2006, the school became one of the first high schools in Florida to have an artificial turf football field. Palm Bay's main local athletic rivals are Bayside High School, Heritage High School and Melbourne High School .

== Activities ==
The school offers students the following activities:

The school has a Marine Corps Junior ROTC.

The Palm Bay Senior High School Engineering program, dubbed PiraTech Robotics, has a group of robotics teams that compete in various FIRST Competitions. In 2011, there were three Vex Robotics Design System teams.

== Notable alumni ==
- Deanne Bell, 1997 — American reality television show, PBS's Design Squad and Discovery Channel's Smash Lab
- Erik Charles Nielsen, 1999 — comedian and actor, Community
- Joe Cohen, 2003 — senior defensive tackle, 2006 National Champion Florida Gators football team, San Francisco 49ers
- Reggie Nelson, 2003 — professional football player
- Xavier Carter, 2004 — former Louisiana State University football player, professional track and field athlete
