= Cocoa High School =

Public high school in Cocoa, Florida, United States

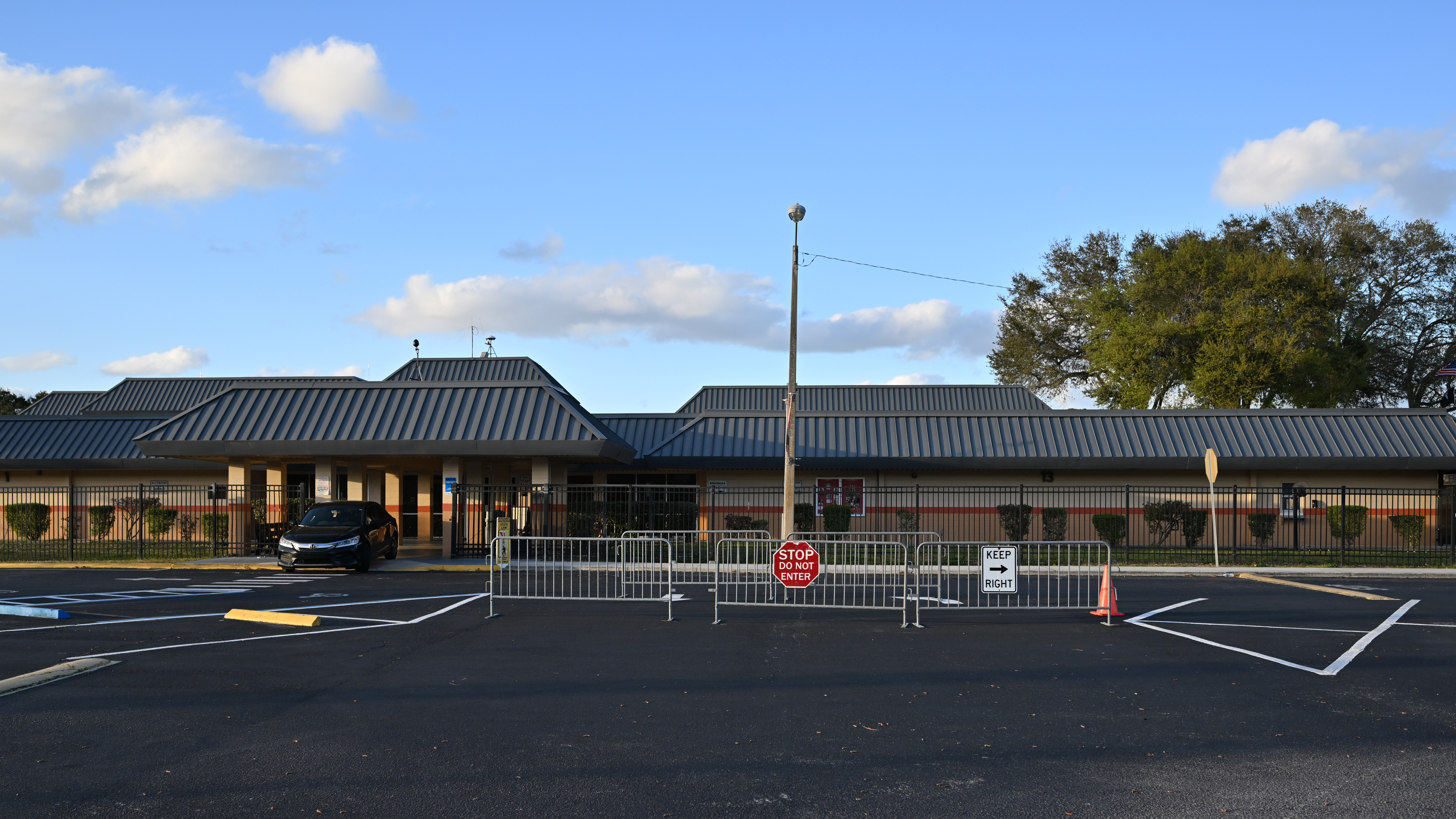

Location
- 2000 Tiger Trail; Cocoa, Florida 32926; United States; 28°22′57.28″N 80°46′7.97″W

Information
- Type: Public junior/senior high school
- Established: June 15, 1917
- School district: Brevard Public Schools
- Principal: C. Denise Stewart
- Staff: 84.00 (FTE)
- Grades: 7-12
- Enrollment: 1,468 (2023-2024)
- Student to teacher ratio: 17.48
- Colors: Orange and black
- Mascot: Tiger
- Website: Cocoa high school homepage

Cocoa High School is in Cocoa, Florida and is part of the Brevard Public Schools District. The principal is C. Denise Stewart .

== History ==
Cocoa High was constructed in 1917. It was a two-story reinforced concrete building on Willard Street, next to Forrest Park Complex. It contained grades 7–12. Seven years later, in 1925, a new three-story building was built on Forrest Avenue.

On September 2, 1952, Cocoa High School opened its new school building for grades 7–12 on Rockledge Avenue, the present site of Rockledge High. The building on Forrest Avenue became the Junior High for grades 7-8th grades. In 1959 grades 7-8 were moved to a middle school. The Forrest Avenue building was used by the then-new Brevard Jr. College, founded in 1959, for two years. In 1966 the school hired its first Black staff member.

In 1970 a school was built at the present site on Rosetine Street (Tiger Trail). There were 18 separate buildings housing grades 9–12. The part of Rosetine Street bordering the Cocoa High campus was renamed "Tiger Trail" in honor of the school's mascot. In the 1974–75 school year, the School Board appointed its first woman to a high school principalship: Ruth Anderson to Cocoa High. In the 1978–79 school year the School Board appointed its first Black person to a Principalship: Richard "Dick" Blake to Cocoa High.

In 2010, the football team played three out-of-state games in an effort to be nationally ranked. In September 2010, the school was ranked 12th in the nation. It also set a county record for number of consecutive football victories: 31.

In October 2008, the football team lost a game to another Brevard County team. It would be another nine years before Rockledge High School beat Cocoa in the local BBQ Bowl District Champions football game in October 2017. Cocoa High has maintained possession of the BBQ Bowl trophy since 2020, a four-year streak to date. They have also seen District 2 State Championship back to back wins in 2022 and 2023, bringing the total number of state championship titles to six.

== Campus ==
The school campus contains 25 single-story buildings located on Tiger Trail, in Cocoa, Florida. A 1,000-seat auditorium was built in 2010.

== Sports ==
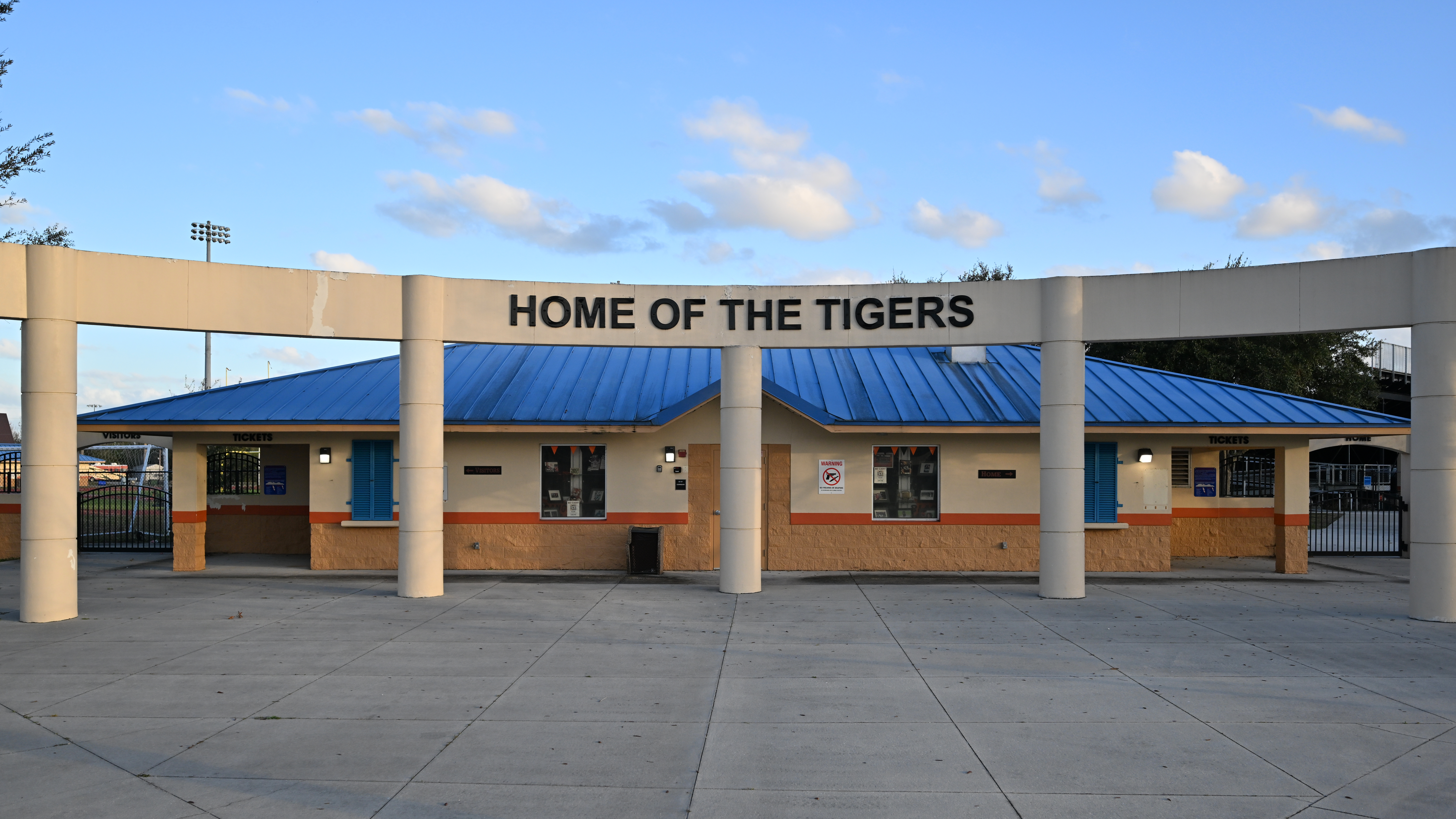
Cocoa High School stadium, Brevard County, FL

Cocoa High was the first high school in Brevard County to win an FHSAA State Championship in any sport, winning the Class "A" State Boys Basketball Championship in 1960. The team finished #1 in the State and had a 29–1 record. The school was also the county's first high school to win a Girl's FHSAA State Championship in any sport winning the Class "AAA" Girls State Basketball Championship in 1978. Coach James Rowe's 2009 Boys Basketball Team won the school's second Basketball Championship winning the Class "AAA" Championship in 2009.

Its primary athletic rival is Rockledge High School.

== Florida Comprehensive Assessment Test (FCAT) controversy ==
At the end of the 2005–2006 school year, Brevard Public School District conducted an internal investigation of Cocoa High which resulted in the removal of four of the school's principals. The administration at the school inaccurately reported its FCAT information. The District found that the school's principal, and three assistant principals, were involved in the scandal. All four administrators were removed from their positions.

In 2007, the school scored a "D" based on the standardized testing for the year, the lowest score in the district. This was raised to an "A", using different criteria in 2010. It is one of five high schools in Brevard to have this grade.

== Suspension controversy ==
In 2014, national media reported on the suspension of an 18-year-old male senior who had starred in gay adult films. The incident sparked outrage on social media, and several students of the school spoke out in his support. His mother said that the principal, Dr. Stephanie Soliven, had expelled him because of his explicit lifestyle career. She also stated that her son was bullied after his schoolmates found his videos online. Brevard County School District spokeswoman Michelle Irwin, however, disputed that he was suspended because of his job. She said the suspension was because of an ongoing investigation about the "possible threats" he made, which the suspended student denied. She also said that he never filed any formal bullying complaints. He was allowed to return to school after four days of suspension and said the principal "apologized to me and said the threats were made up (by other students)." Irwin confirmed that the investigation was complete and he was cleared of suspicion while refusing to disclose the exact reason behind the suspension, citing the Family Educational Rights and Privacy Act.

== Notable alumni ==
- Bob Anderson (1956), football player.
- Emory L. Bennett (Class of 1948), Korean War Medal of Honor recipient.
- Vassar Carlton (1932), athlete, attorney and judge
- Rodney Chester (Class of 1983), actor, dancer, choreographer
- Jamel Dean, football player
- James Folston (Class of 1989), former NFL player.
- Tarean Folston, former professional football player
- Chauncey Gardner-Johnson (2016), professional football player
- Javian Hawkins, football player
- Jesse Lee Kercheval (Class of 1974, graduated 1973), author, poet, and professor
- Carrot Top (Scott Thompson; Class of 1983), comedian.
- Ronald Patrick (Class of 2009), former professional NFL football player
- Chip Skowron, (Class of 1987) hedge fund portfolio manager convicted of insider trading
- John Tanner, former NFL player
- Jawaan Taylor (2016), professional football player.
- Zach Thomas, former NFL player
