= Richard Amman =

American football player (born 1950)

No. 73
- Position: Defensive tackle

Personal information
- Born: September 21, 1950 (age 76); Seattle, Washington, U.S.
- Listed height: 6 ft 5 in (1.96 m)
- Listed weight: 245 lb (111 kg)

Career information
- High school: Cocoa Beach (FL)
- College: Florida State
- NFL draft: 1972: 10th round, 260th overall pick

Career history
- Dallas Cowboys (1972)*; Baltimore Colts (1972–1973); Florida Blazers (1974); San Antonio Wings (1975)
- * Offseason or practice squad member only

Career NFL statistics
- Games played: 28
- Stats at Pro Football Reference

Richard Dale Amman (born September 21, 1950) is an American former professional football player who was a defensive tackle in the National Football League (NFL) for the Baltimore Colts. He also was a member of the Florida Blazers and San Antonio Wings in the World Football League (WFL). He played college football for the Florida State Seminoles.

== Early life and college ==
Amman moved to Florida when he was 11 years old. He attended Cocoa Beach High School, where he was an All-county defensive tackle. He moved on to Northeast Oklahoma Junior College.

After his freshman season he transferred to Florida State University, where he began his career at center, before being switched to defensive tackle as a sophomore. As a junior, he was named a starter at defensive tackle, making 37 tackles and 2 fumble recoveries. As a senior, he registered 81 tackles (37 solo).

== Professional career ==
=== Dallas Cowboys ===
Amman was selected by the Dallas Cowboys in the tenth round (260th overall) of the 1972 NFL draft. He was waived on August 29.

=== Baltimore Colts ===
On August 30, 1972, he was claimed off waivers by the Baltimore Colts. He was a backup defensive end that played mainly on special teams. He had 16 tackles on defense.

In 1973, he started two games at defensive end. He posted 10 tackles and recovered one fumble. He was released on September 8, 1974.

=== Florida Blazers ===
In 1974, he was signed by the Florida Blazers of the World Football League. In 1975, the team relocated to San Antonio and were rechristened as the San Antonio Wings, where he played until the league folded on October 22.

== Personal life ==
After football, he worked for the Lake school district for 24 years. His son Eustis played football at Florida State University and was a part of the 2001 preseason roster for the San Diego Chargers and Jacksonville Jaguars.
