= Education in Brevard County, Florida =

Education in Brevard County, Florida consists of public and private schools, including private colleges, and secondary and primary schools.

== Undergraduate and graduate ==
College education in Brevard County is provided by Eastern Florida State College and Florida Institute of Technology in Melbourne.

Eastern Florida State College (EFSC), formerly known as Brevard Community College (BCC), has four campuses and online programs. 15,000 students attend EFSC with campuses in Melbourne, Palm Bay, Titusville and Cocoa.

All campuses offer the Associate in Arts degree intended to facilitate transfer to a university and bachelor's degrees. The addition of four-year degrees prompted BCC's name change to EFSC in 2013. EFSC also offers technical and vocational training for Associate Degrees and Certificates for entering the workforce, improving professional skills, and developing new competence.

Other courses include a two-year nursing degree and certification by the "Law Enforcement Academy" which is a basic requirement for employment in law enforcement in Brevard County.

Florida Tech (Florida Institute of Technology) is a university which offers Bachelors, Masters, and Doctorate degrees, specializing in the sciences. 4,400 students are enrolled on site, of which half are at the graduate level. About 26% are from abroad. It is located in Melbourne.

The University of Central Florida has a branch on the Community College Cocoa Campus. Additionally it operates the Florida Solar Energy Center.

Other colleges include Barry University, Columbia College, a cooperating program with Embry-Riddle Aeronautical University, Florida Metropolitan University-Melbourne, Keiser University - Melbourne and Webster University.

== Elementary and secondary ==
For 2005, the students had higher SAT scores than any other Florida School District.

The superintendent of schools was selected as best in state by his peers in 2005.

For 2005, the District has a higher percentage (9%) of National Board Certified Teachers than any of the other largest ten districts in the state.

In 2005, Brevard is first in Florida in the number of "A"-rated schools in the 10 largest districts.

AARP ranked the school district No. 8 on the 2005 list of Best Employers for Workers Over 50. It was the only public-school system and the highest-ranked Florida employer on the national list.

In 2005, Brevard led the state in science in fifth and 11th grade assessments.

In 2006, Brevard students took almost a third of all prizes at the state science fair, including the most first-place awards. This occurred in 2007, as well.

A team consisting of Brevard high school students stood second in the world in the robotics world championship in 2007.

In 2006, the District had 5 of the top 10 Elementary Schools in the state, according to the Florida Dept. of Ed.

Brevard is in the top ten in the state in each of the 22 areas of assessment on the standard statewide exams given students each year.

In 2005 & 2006, Newsweek ranked Cocoa Beach High School among the top 100 US high schools (out of 21,000) in part due to its International Baccalaureate program.

10th graders led the state in the writing exam in 2006.

The state has ranked 15 of the elementary schools as tops in the state, including a Title I South Lake, a former "D"-ranked school.

Brevard leads the state in the number of high school students dual enrolled in secondary and college courses.

Percentage of students using drugs other than marijuana in their lifetime reached a high of 28% for high school students in 2008, and a high of 18.2% for middle school students in 2010.

=== Sports ===
In 2013, about one percent of the county's 8,500 student athletes received athletic scholarships to college. According to the NCAA, the national average is five percent. A coach asked why not more as the county had one of the best Division II football teams in the state (but not Division I). One of the problems is that Brevard is proximate to the same area for a scout as nearby Orlando, from whence more likely candidates will emerge.

== Continuing education ==
Continuing education is provided by the Brevard Community College, and the University of Central Florida.

Lifelong learning is offered by the Community College at four branches throughout the county as well as evening courses at high schools.

The County School Board sponsors BPS-TV. Those interested can study for the General Education Development exam, learn a foreign language, or learn about the arts. From midnight to 6 a.m., the station's Classic Arts Showcase offers ballet, jazz and classical music programming.

As the Florida's land grant college, the University of Florida runs the agriculturally-oriented Cooperative extension service training and information center, in the county.
