= Jawaan Taylor =

American football player (born 1997)

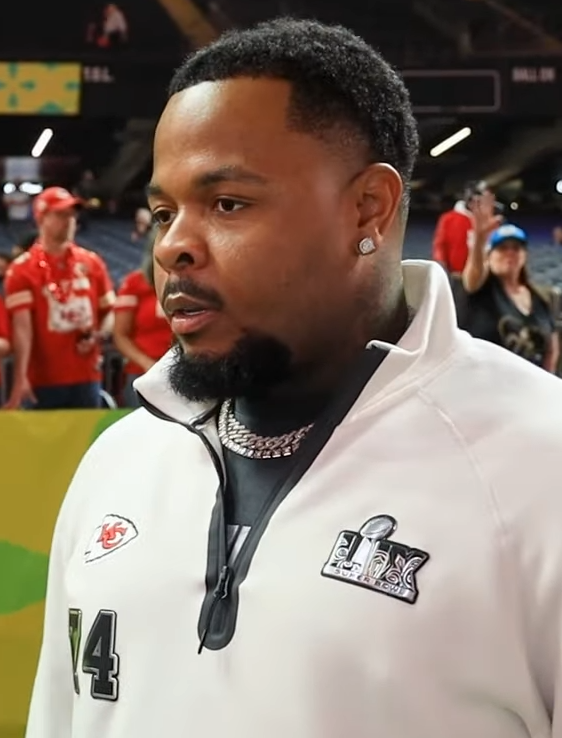
- Taylor during an interview in 2025

No. 71 – Atlanta Falcons
- Position: Offensive tackle
- Roster status: Active

Personal information
- Born: November 25, 1997 (age 28); Cocoa, Florida, U.S.
- Listed height: 6 ft 5 in (1.96 m)
- Listed weight: 312 lb (142 kg)

Career information
- High school: Cocoa
- College: Florida (2016–2018)
- NFL draft: 2019: 2nd round, 35th overall pick

Career history
- Jacksonville Jaguars (2019–2022); Kansas City Chiefs (2023–2025); Atlanta Falcons (2026–present)

Awards and highlights
- Super Bowl champion (LVIII); PFWA All-Rookie Team (2019)

Career NFL statistics as of Week 10, 2026
- Games played: 121
- Games started: 121
- Stats at Pro Football Reference

Jawaan Taylor (born November 25, 1997) is an American professional football offensive tackle for the Atlanta Falcons of the National Football League (NFL). He played college football for the Florida Gators. He was selected by the Jacksonville Jaguars in the second round (35th overall) of the 2019 NFL draft. Taylor signed for the Kansas City Chiefs in free agency upon the expiration of his rookie contract. He was the starting right tackle as the team won Super Bowl LVIII in his first season with the team.

== Early life ==
Taylor attended Cocoa High School in Cocoa, Florida. He was originally committed to the University of Miami to play college football before switching to the University of Florida.

== College career ==
Taylor became a starter at the University of Florida his true freshman year in 2016. After his junior season in 2018, he decided to forgo his senior year and enter the 2019 NFL draft.

== Professional career ==
Pre-draft measurables
Height	Weight	Arm length	Hand span	Wingspan	Bench press
6 ft 5 in (1.96 m)	312 lb (142 kg)	35 1/8 in (0.89 m)	10 in (0.25 m)	7 ft 0 3/4 in (2.15 m)	24 reps
All values from NFL Combine

=== Jacksonville Jaguars ===
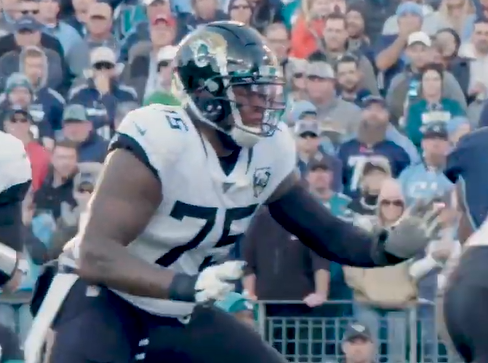
Taylor playing for the Jaguars in 2019.

Taylor was drafted by the Jacksonville Jaguars in the second round (35th overall) of the 2019 NFL draft. He was named to the PFWA All-Rookie Team.

Taylor was placed on the reserve/COVID-19 list by the Jaguars on July 28, 2020, but was activated five days later.

In his four years in Jacksonville, Taylor started every regular season game at right tackle, playing nearly every snap.

=== Kansas City Chiefs ===
On March 16, 2023, Taylor signed a four-year, $80 million contract with the Kansas City Chiefs. In Taylor's first season with the Chiefs, they won Super Bowl LVIII in overtime against the San Francisco 49ers 25–22, giving him his first Super Bowl championship. In 2024, the Chiefs made it to Super Bowl LIX, where they lost 40–22 to the Philadelphia Eagles.

Taylor started all twelve of his appearances for Kansas City during the 2025 campaign. On December 20, 2025, Taylor was placed on injured reserve due to an elbow injury, ending his season. On March 4, 2026, Taylor was released by the Chiefs.

=== Atlanta Falcons ===
On April 10, 2026, Taylor signed a one-year, $5 million contract with the Atlanta Falcons.

== Personal life ==
In September 2025, Taylor announced his engagement to his girlfriend, Tiffany Hylton.
