= James Folston =

American football player (born 1971)

No. 55, 58
- Position: Linebacker

Personal information
- Born: August 14, 1971 (age 55); Cocoa, Florida, U.S.
- Listed height: 6 ft 3 in (1.91 m)
- Listed weight: 240 lb (109 kg)

Career information
- High school: Cocoa
- College: Northeast Louisiana
- NFL draft: 1994: 2nd round, 52nd overall pick

Career history
- Los Angeles/Oakland Raiders (1994–1998); Arizona Cardinals (1999–2001)

Career NFL statistics
- Tackles: 57
- Sacks: 3
- Fumble recoveries: 1
- Stats at Pro Football Reference

James Edward Folston (born August 14, 1971) is an American former professional football player who was a linebacker in the National Football League (NFL). He played for the Los Angeles/Oakland Raiders and the Arizona Cardinals.

== Early life ==
Folston attended Cocoa High School in Cocoa, Florida, and participated in football, basketball, and track. Folston was athletic and fortunate enough to earn a college football scholarship after playing only one year of varsity football.

== College career ==
Folston accepted a scholarship to attend Northeast Louisiana University which is now University of Louisiana at Monroe. As a sophomore Folston cracked the starting lineup as a Defensive end. During his junior season the pro scouts and collegiate All-America voters began to take notice of Folston's abilities on the field. During his third year in a ULM uniform he recorded 12 sacks. In 1993, he ended his career with 27 sacks, which ranks first on the all-time sacks list.

Following his senior season he was selected as an All-American by the Associated Press, the Walter Camp Foundation, Football Gazette, and Pro Football Weekly. Folston was also first-team All-Louisiana and first-team All-Southland Conference during his junior and senior seasons for head coach Dave Roberts. Folston earned ULM's Iron Man Award and was chosen to play in the East–West Shrine Game and the Hula Bowl at the conclusion of his senior season.

Folston was invited to the 1994 NFL Combine.

Folston is considered one of the greatest defensive ends in school history. He played the game with passion and violent intentions. Playing with those traits put him in position to be inducted into the University of Louisiana at Monroe Athletics Hall of Fame in 2010.

== Professional career ==
Pre-draft measurables
Height	Weight	Arm length	Hand span	40-yard dash	10-yard split	20-yard split	20-yard shuttle	Vertical jump	Broad jump	Bench press
6 ft 2 3/4 in (1.90 m)	235 lb (107 kg)	34 in (0.86 m)	10 1/8 in (0.26 m)	4.62 s	1.65 s	2.72 s	4.34 s	34.5 in (0.88 m)	9 ft 7 in (2.92 m)	25 reps

=== Los Angeles Raiders/Oakland Raiders ===
Folston was selected by the Los Angeles Raiders in the second round of the 1994 NFL draft. Folston played for the Raiders for 5 seasons.(1994–1998)

=== Arizona Cardinals ===
Folston played for the Arizona Cardinals for 3 seasons. (1999–2001)
