= High School Competency Test =

Standardized test previously used by high schools in Florida

The High School Competency Test, or HSCT, was a test used by all public high schools in the state of Florida from 1981 until the implementation of the FCAT in 1998 (which was then replaced by FSA (Florida Standard Assessments) in 1999). First mandated by the State Board of Education in 1977, it was the first attempt by the state to ensure that school districts across the state were being held to at least some minimal standards of accountability.

The test was administered to all public high school juniors. Passage was required in order to be issued a high school diploma. Students failing the HSCT were allowed unlimited opportunities to retake sections that they had failed, with such retests routinely administered by school faculty, thus making enforcement of the "must pass" proviso problematic, at best.

The test was phased out early in Jeb Bush's first administration, though students who entered high school before the creation of the FCAT were grandfathered in and allowed to take the HSCT instead of the FCAT, if they so wished. Even today, theoretically, a student (who would now be in their mid- to late twenties, at least) who had not graduated because of failing the HSCT can request a readministration of the test in order to get their high school diploma. In practice, such a test would probably need to be administered by a community college; many of the state's community colleges continue to use the HSCT within their adult studies departments.
