= West Shore Junior – Senior High School =

High school in Florida, United States

Coordinates: 28°6′27.99″N 80°37′32.57″W

Location
- 250 Wildcat Alley; Florida

Information
- Motto: Excellence Achieved
- Established: 1998; 28 years ago
- NCES District ID: 1200150
- NCES School ID: 120015003296
- Principal: Buster Clark
- Teaching staff: 52 FTE
- Grades: 7-12
- Enrollment: 931
- Student to teacher ratio: 17.9
- Yearbook: Arcadia
- Website: https://www.brevardschools.org/o/wsjrsr

West Shore Junior – Senior High School, more often called West Shore, is a secondary school located at 250 Wildcat Alley in Melbourne, Florida. West Shore enrolls students from grades seven through twelve. It is part of the Brevard Public Schools System. It was the first "School of Choice" in Brevard County, Florida. In 2013, U.S. News & World Report ranked West Shore the 5th Best High School in the State of Florida. On a nationwide basis it was ranked #57 out of the 24,140 public high schools reviewed.

Buster Clark is the Principal.

== History ==
In 2023 US World Report Ranked the school 43rd in the nation. https://www.usnews.com/education/best-high-schools/florida/rankings

In 2008 U.S. News & World Report named it in the "Best" category among the nations high schools, one of two in Brevard County.

== Student body ==
As a public school, West Shore accepts any student who has met minimum academic and social expectations set by the school, provided there is space available. If there are more students interested in the school than is space available, a lottery is held to determine acceptance.

The Maximum school enrollment for all grades is capped at 950 students, in an effort to keep class sizes small.

Students are accepted from across the county. However, most students enrolled reside in southern Brevard county, mainly Melbourne, Palm Bay, Rockledge, West Melbourne and the Melbourne barrier island beachside.

== Academics ==
West Shore is unique in several areas:

- Additional recognition of advanced graduation accomplishments have been increased from the minimum set by the county, but not necessarily required to graduate. These include the addition of two extra credits, leadership in one or more areas or projects, two completed areas of accelerated study with either Advanced Placement classes or dual enrollment at Eastern Florida State College or Florida Institute of Technology, eligibility for at least one post secondary scholarship, and completion of a senior project (similar to a senior thesis).
- There is a homeroom period once weekly during power hour. (except for special events where homeroom may be held on a different day and/or time).
- Senior Pranks are endorsed by school staff at the end of the year, although they require prior approval.

== Activities ==
=== Athletics ===
The Athletic Director is Tony Riopelle, who also is an assistant coach with the varsity basketball team. The boys soccer program has won two state championships, in 2012 and 2017. The school competes in the following sports:

- Dance
- Basketball
- Bowling
- Football
- Volleyball
- Soccer
- Swimming
- Cross Country
- Track & Field
- Tennis
- Golf
- Lacrosse

== Recognition ==
Purple Ribbon School in 2025, US Department of Education.

Blue Ribbon School, U.S Department of Education, 2004-2005, 2014, and 2024

The school scored the highest in the county on the 2007 state writing test.

The school was ranked 57 out of 24,140 in the country. Criteria were scoring high in state exams for both majority and minority students, and Advanced Placement testing including wide participation.

In 2008, the school, using state criteria, was tied with one other school in the county for having a 100% graduation rate.

Eighth grade students performed the highest in the county on the 2009 FCAT essay test, at 4.80 tying with one other school. Sophomores scored the highest in the county on the essay test with a 4.90.

In 2010, the school had nine National Merit Scholarship semi-finalists out of 30 for the county.

In 2012, the school had 11 National Merit Scholarship semi-finalists out of 33 for the county.

In 2014, Newsweek ranked the school the best in Florida and 81st in the nation.
