= Melbourne High School (Melbourne, Florida) =

Public secondary school in Melbourne, Florida, United States

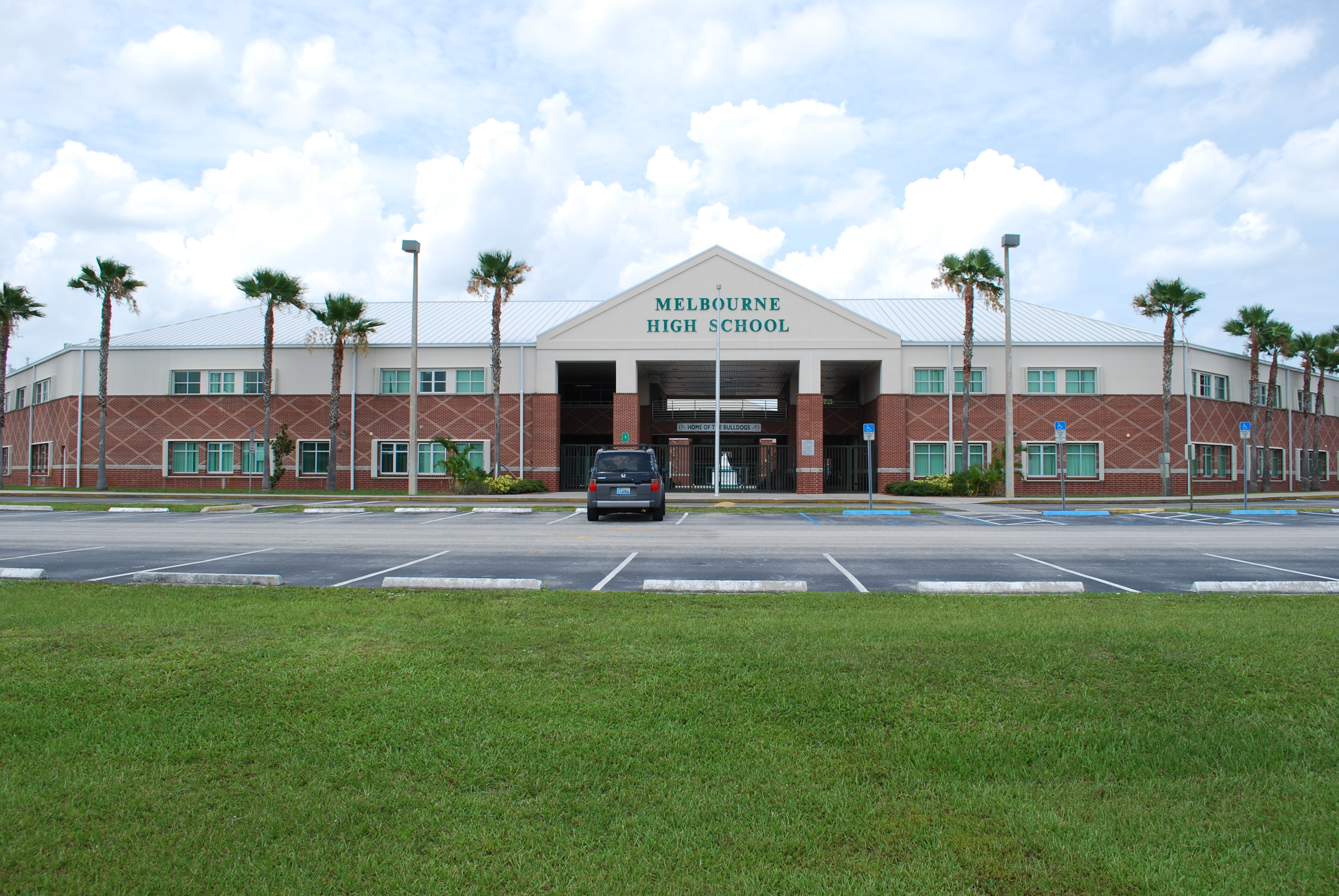

Location
- 74 Bulldog Boulevard; Melbourne, Florida 32901; United States; 28°05′24″N 80°37′14″W

Information
- Other names: Mel-Hi, Mel-High, MHS, Melbourne Senior High School
- School type: Public secondary High School
- Established: 1894
- School district: Brevard Public Schools
- Principal: James T. Kirk, Ed.D.
- Staff: 97.50 (FTE)
- Grades: 9–12
- Enrollment: 2,226 (2024–25)
- Student to teacher ratio: 23.07
- Campus size: 40 Acres
- Colors: Green and white
- Mascot: Bulldog
- Yearbook: Stepping Stone
- Website: www.brevardschools.org/MelbourneHS
- Last updated: August 21, 2025

Melbourne High School, Mel-Hi, Mel-Hi, or MHS is a public secondary school located in Melbourne, Florida, United States and operated by Brevard Public Schools.

== History ==
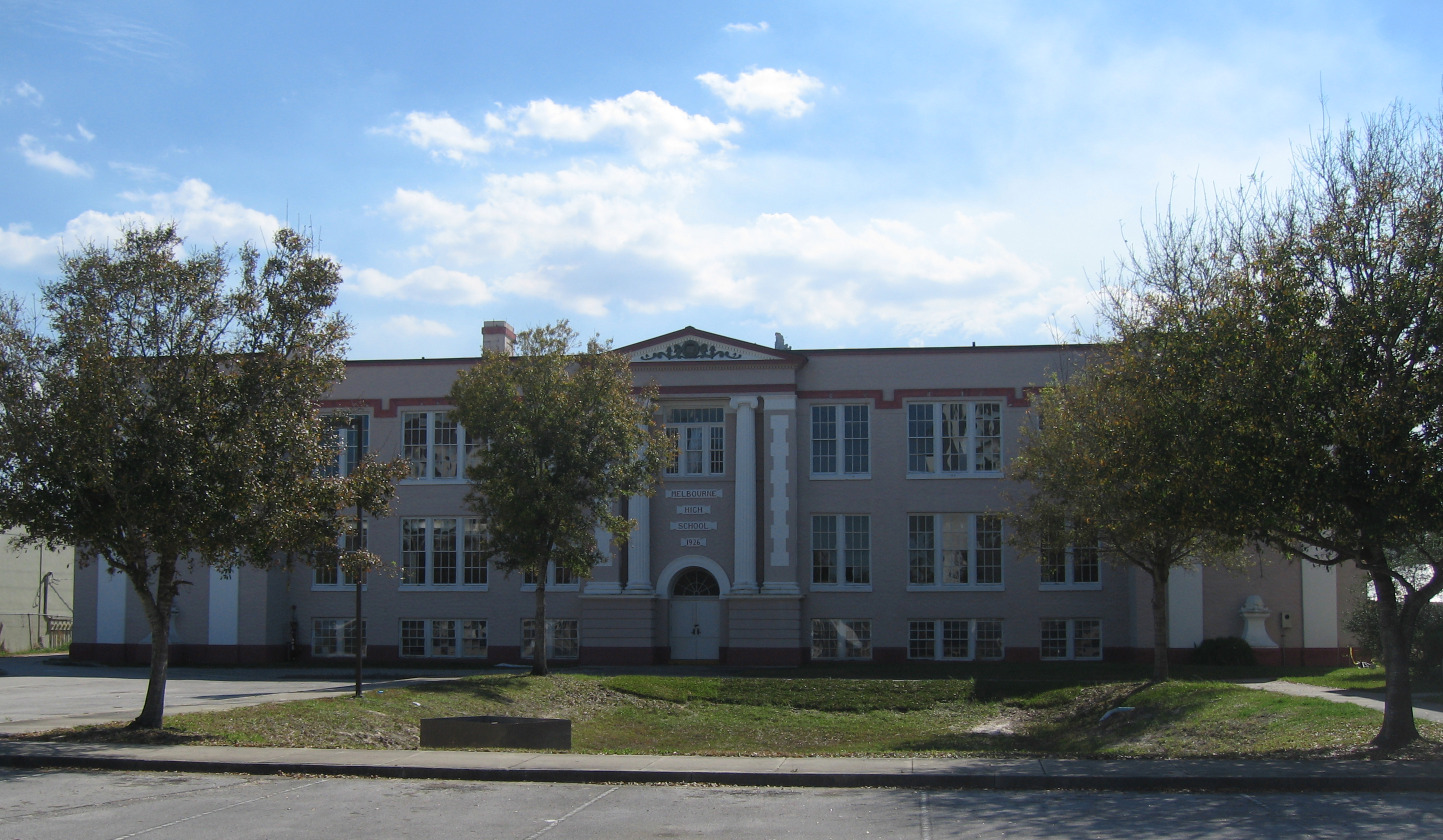
Old Melbourne High School, early 2000s

The first mention of a "Melbourne High School" was back in 1894. This school was a one-room schoolhouse similar to the Little Red Schoolhouse and Professor Winters from Stetson University served as the teacher and admitted students to the Stetson University.

By 1897, William T. Wells and Nora Wells constructed a larger school building and kept Professor Winters as the teacher. This building was also shared with the First Methodist Church of Melbourne.

An official school building was constructed on East New Haven Avenue in 1919, though it was shared with elementary children. An official high school (grades 7-12) was constructed east of the 1919 building and became Melbourne High School. By 1928, two other buildings were constructed on the eight acre property to create the Melbourne School Complex. By 1940, extra one-room buildings were constructed on the site to accommodate more students.

In 1948, Eau Gallie High School on Pineapple Avenue closed. Their former students were bused to Melbourne High. Rotary International chartered their first Interact service club ever with 23 students at the school in 1960.

In about 1953, Zora Neale Hurston staged the school's first integrated concert, though the school had not yet been integrated itself. She also served as a substitute teacher around this time. The school experienced race riots during the period of integration from 1969 to 1976.

In 1953, a new school complex was being constructed off Babcock Street. At the time, the area was pretty undeveloped and places such as the airport were the only other items in that area. The school relocated and started classes on the new campus in 1955. Subsequent additions such as a football stadium (1956), larger library (1963), larger cafeteria (1966), Home Economics Building (1966), and an automotive garage (1966) allowed the school to handle Melbourne and West Melbourne's growing student populations. The Melbourne School Complex continue to house Melbourne Elementary (closed in 1975) and Brevard Junior College.

In 1976, Melbourne High School constructed their own Liberty Bell to celebrate the country's bicentennial anniversary. The bell was constructed out of concrete and had a base with the Four Freedoms (Freedom from Want, Fear, and Freedom of Speech and Worship). The campus had various murals and other landmarks such as a fountain, Victory Bell, and The 'Bulldog Tower'.

In the early 1980s, the two 1928 additions to the Melbourne School Complex were demolished to make room for Trinity Towers South. The school's International Baccalaureate Prep program started in 1981. Phil Roberts painted murals in the Melbourne High Cafeteria in the early 1980s as a school wide beautification effort began.

By the early 1990s, the Mid-Century Modern campus began to deteriorate. Palm Bay High School was also facing issues, however there was only enough money within Brevard Public Schools to fix one of the campuses. The end argument was that it would be best for both schools for the money to be split between the two, Palm Bay High gets renovations, while Melbourne High gets a partial campus restructure. In 1994, all of the multipurpose classroom buildings (which were two story rectangular buildings with outdoor hallways) and the automotive garage were demolished in phases and replaced with 50 portables.

On December 10, 1997, the new Melbourne High Campus was completed and dedicated. The school built three new classroom buildings, while kept other buildings such as the auditorium, gym, and library (though money was invested into them a few years later). Another 25-room classroom building was constructed in 2000 while a new gym was built in 2008 and a new science building in 2009.

In 2009 Melbourne High School became a magnet school which includes an Academy of Business and Finance. This is a National Academy Foundation program. In 2015, the Melbourne High Cafeteria was renovated, which nearly resulted in the loss of two of Phil Roberts murals. The murals were carefully removed and relocated in the Cafeteria by Hamilton Masonry.

== Academics ==
The school has an Academy of Business and Finance ("The Academy"), International Baccalaureate program, Advanced Placement program and dual enrollment.

== Athletics ==
The school's mascot is the bulldog. The school's rivals are Satellite High School, Eau Gallie High School, and Palm Bay High School.

=== Recognition ===
- Football 2A 1966 State Champions.
- Girls' Soccer State Champions 1987, 2009, 2010 5A, and 2013 4A.
- Boys' Soccer 1994 5A State Champions, 2009 & 2010 6A State Champions, 2014 4A State Champions
- Boys' Cross country won first in the state 4A Championships in 2007 and 2008
- Girls' Cross country won first in the state 4A Championships in 2006

== Campus ==
The current Melbourne High Campus was completed in 1997. The campus is a mix of Mid-Century Modern buildings and newer classroom buildings. The school takes up 40 acres in Midtown Melbourne, which is home to the Melbourne Shopping Center, Melbourne Orlando International Airport, and once the Brevard Mall and Sears. In 2008, the school installed an artificial turf football field and a new gym. In 2008, the school board started construction on a new eight laboratory science building, which was completed in early 2009.

== Notable people ==
=== Alumni ===
- Kirsten Bloom Allen - ballet dancer and actress
- Bruce Bochy (1973) - manager of the Texas Rangers
- Brian Bollinger (1987) - former NFL player with the San Francisco 49ers
- Jorja Fox (1986) - actress
- Dena Grayson (1988) - biochemical researcher
- Kristin Grubka (2007) - soccer player
- Darrell Hammond (1973) - American actor, stand-up comedian and impressionist
- Kim Hammond (1963) - Football player, lawyer, and judge.
- David J. Lane (1978) - U.S. Ambassador
- Josh Miller, professional baseball coach and 2022 World Series champion
- Bill Nelson (1959) - U.S. Senator from Florida and Payload Specialist on Space Shuttle Columbia mission STS-61-C
- Lee Nelson (1973) - former NFL player with the St. Louis/Arizona Cardinals
- Allison Schroeder (1997) - Academy Award nominated screenwriter of Hidden Figures.
- Robbin Thompson (1967) - singer-songwriter
- Mickey Zofko (1967) - former NFL player with Detroit Lions and New York Giants

=== Staff ===
- Joseph M. Acaba, astronaut, who taught science 1999–2000.
