= Cocoa Beach Junior/Senior High School =

Public school in Cocoa Beach, Florida, United States

Location
- 1500 Minuteman Causeway; Cocoa Beach, Brevard County, Florida 32931; United States; 28°19′3.85″N 80°37′49.78″W

Information
- Funding type: Public
- Founded: 1964
- School district: Brevard County School District
- Principal: Tim Powers
- Staff: 49.50 (FTE)
- Grades: 7–12
- Gender: Co-Ed
- Enrollment: 982 (2022–23)
- Student to teacher ratio: 19.84
- Color
- Mascot: Minuteman

Cocoa Beach Jr./Sr. High School (formerly Cocoa Beach High School) is a public junior/senior high school that is a part of the Brevard County Public School System with students in grades seven through twelfth located in Cocoa Beach, Florida. Founded in 1964 it is one of two high schools in Brevard county to offer the International Baccalaureate Diploma Programme. The school's mascot is the Minuteman and current principal is Tim Powers.

== Academic recognition ==
In 2006, the school ranked 46th on Newsweek's Top 1000 High Schools list. In 2008, U.S. News & World Report ranked the school "Best," only one of three so named in Brevard County. The school continues to rank in the top schools according to Newsweek.

In 2008, seven students were selected as National Merit Scholarship semifinalists, out of 28 total selections in the county.

== Athletic awards ==
- 2007 Surfing Florida Champions
- 2004 Boys Basketball state champions
- 1988 Girls Basketball state champions
- 1973 U.S. High Schools Team Championships in Chicago, Ill, Cocoa Beach placed 17th out of over 60 teams.

== Other achievements ==
- Runner-up in FIRST Robotics Competition FIRST Championship 2007 (Joint with Rockledge High School)
- JROTC Color Guard State Champions 2002
- 1973 Florida State High School Team Chess Champions, Brevard County High School Team Chess Champions 1973 and 1972.
- 2021 JROTC Raiders Men's Team State Runner-up
- 2021 JROTC Raiders Women's Team State Champions

== Notable alumni ==
- Richard Amman, former NFL player
- Brian Johnson (college baseball), 2009 graduate, All-American baseball player for the University of Florida Professional baseball player.
- Kelly Slater, professional surfer, 11-time world champion
- Cullen Douglas, professional actor, nominated for two Emmys
- Willam Belli, American actor, drag queen, and model
