= Bayside High School (Palm Bay, Florida) =

Public high school in Palm Bay, Florida, United States

Location
- 1901 Degroodt Road SW; Palm Bay, Florida 32908; United States
- 27°57′3.80″N 80°40′35.19″W

Information
- Type: Public
- Established: 1998
- School district: Brevard County School District
- Principal: Holli Zander
- Staff: 81.00 (FTE)
- Grades: 9–12
- Enrollment: 1,854 (2022–23)
- Student to teacher ratio: 22.89
- Colors: Black, gray and teal
- Mascot: Bears
- Website: www.brevardschools.org/BaysideHS

Bayside High School is a public high school located in Palm Bay, Florida, United States. It is part of the Brevard County School District.

== History ==
Bayside was opened in August 1998 with grades 9 and 10. Grade 11 was added in 1999, grade 12 in 2000. The first graduation was held in May 2001.

Upon its construction, Bayside was the first new high school campus built in the Brevard County School District in more than a quarter century—since Astronaut High School in Titusville opened in 1972.

On May 12, 2008, the school was evacuated, threatened by a citywide fire. The school was closed the following day along with other schools in the Palm Bay area.

== Campus ==
The school is based on a design by Schenkel Shultz and its layout is shared by Winter Springs High School. The final estimated cost was just over $10 million. In 2009, a classroom building and an auditorium were added.

== Academics ==
In January 2007 school began an engineering magnet program known as Bayside Engineering and Technology Academy. Beginning in the 2011-12 year, the school began a new academy, known as Bayside Fine and Technical Arts Academy (ENCORE).

For the 2006-2007 School year Bayside was rated for the first time as an "A" school under the Florida A++ plan. The school had been rated a "B" for the previous 4 years.

== Athletics ==
The school competes in the FHSAA Class 5A. The school football team was the Class 5A, District 11 district champions for the first time in 2009.

== Notable alumni ==
- Billy Horschel, 2005 — professional golfer; 2014 FedEx Cup champion; former University of Florida golfer
- Chris Heston, 2006 — professional baseball player
- Deon Broomfield, 2009 — professional football player
