= Stone High School (Florida) =

Location
- 1101 E University Boulevard; Melbourne, Florida; 32901; United States
- Coordinates: 28°03′47″N 80°36′20″W

Information
- Type: Public
- Grades: 9–12
- Nickname: Gophers

Stone High School was a public high school for black students in Melbourne, Florida. It closed in 1987.

== History ==
Melbourne was settled by black freedmen as early as 1867. In 1883 John Goode established a school known as the little red schoolhouse. While the school served both black and white students, the classes were segregated: white students attended in the morning, and black students in the afternoon. In 1909 a one-room school for black children was opened at the corner of Line Street and Lipscomb Street. In 1921, Melbourne Vocational School was built at Church and Race Streets and served until 1953, when it burned and the grounds were made into Brothers Park, named for Wright Brothers, one of the black founders of Melbourne. For the next several years, black students were educated in a temporary building at the former Naval Air Station Melbourne Hospital at the Melbourne Airport until Stone High School was built in 1958 to replace Melbourne Vocational. In 1987 the schools were integrated and Stone High School was repurposed as Stone Middle School.
