= Florida Comprehensive Assessment Test =

Standardized test formerly used in public schools in Florida

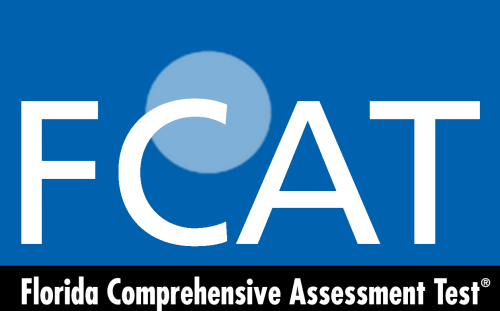
FCAT official blue logo

The Florida Comprehensive Assessment Test, or the FCAT/FCAT 2.0, was the standardized test used in the primary and secondary public schools of Florida. First administered statewide in 1998, it replaced the State Student Assessment Test (SSAT) and the High School Competency Test (HSCT). As of the 2014–2015 school year FCAT was replaced in the state of Florida. The Florida Department of Education later implemented the Florida Standards Assessments (FSA) for English Language Arts, Reading, Mathematics and a Writing or typing test. A Comprehensive science test is still used for grades 5 and 8.

== Administration and use ==
The FCAT (Florida Comprehensive Assessment Test) was administered annually, in late February and early to mid-March as well as April, to all public school students in grades three through eleven. Students in grades three through ten were required to take the reading and math portion every year. Private and parochial school students were not required to take the FCAT; most of these schools administered another standardized test instead, such as the Stanford Achievement Test, which was exactly the same as the FCAT NRT, formerly taken by public school students. FCAT Science was administered annually to public school students in the fifth, eighth, and eleventh grades. In the fourth, eighth, and tenth grades, public school students took the FCAT Writes exam (formerly called "Florida Writes!" and "FCAT Writing+"); unlike the other tests, the FCAT Writes exam was administered in early February to allow adequate time for scoring before the end of the school year.

Students' results from the FCAT were compiled to generate a grade for each public school. Under this plan, public schools received a grade from A to F, based on what percentage of students pass the exams and what percentage of both the entire student body and the bottom 25% of the school demonstrate adequate growth on the exam over their previous year's performance. If a school improved a letter grade (including schools that improve from an F to a D), or maintains an A, the state direct-deposited "reward money" to the school in the amount of $75 per student enrolled (this amount used to be $100 before the 2008 recession). This money was not collectively bargained or funneled through the recipient school's district. Schools could use the money for staff bonuses, educational equipment, materials related to boosting student performance, or to hire temporary personnel to assist in improving student performance.

As of the 2010–2011 school year it has been called the "FCAT 2.0" On actual test material it was labeled "FCAT 2.0 Next Generation Sunshine State Standards."

As of the 2014–2015 school year the FCAT was formally replaced with the Florida Standards Assessments (FSA).

== Promotion and graduation ==
When originally introduced, students in fourth grade were required to pass the reading portion of the test in order to be promoted to the fifth grade. After passage of the No Child Left Behind Act by the United States Congress in 2001, the mandatory passage was moved from fourth grade down to third grade, so as to align Florida with federal statutory requirements. In addition to the third grade requirement, public school students in Florida must also pass the tenth grade FCAT, not only in reading, but also in mathematics, in order to be eligible to receive a high school diploma. Grade 3 and graduation are the only two instances in which federal or state statute require passage of the FCAT; it is given at the other grades for the intention of providing diagnostic information, both on students and schools. However, many counties in the state have adopted other promotional requirements tied to the FCAT, but these are at the discretion of each individual county school board.

Exceptional education (ESE) students were able to waive the FCAT requirement to get a Standard High School Diploma. Those ESE students wishing to obtain a regular high school diploma must score a passing grade on the FCAT or receive a waiver for the FCAT. In order to get the waiver, ESE students must prove that they have taken several steps to try to pass the FCAT and must also show that they have improved every time they have taken the test.

== Options after failing the FCAT ==
A student failing the tenth grade test—that is, the test required for graduation—is allowed approximately five additional opportunities to pass it prior to graduation. Originally, students were given four more chances to pass the test after failing it in 10th grade—in October and March of both their junior and senior years in high school. However, starting in 2006, students were provided an additional test administration during the summer between school years. Students, however, may not retake the Grade 10 FCAT during the summer between their sophomore and junior year because additional time is needed for remediation. If students do not pass the FCAT prior to their scheduled graduation, they may continue to retake it until they pass it to earn a standard high school diploma.

Students completing the minimum number of credits for high school graduation, but not passing the FCAT, may still be allowed to graduate with a certificate of completion. Students may substitute the appropriate subject-area score from either the ACT or SAT. A score of 19 on either the Reading or Mathematics sections of the ACT or a 280 on the Reading and a 370 on the Mathematics sections of the SAT can be used to waive the FCAT requirement after the student has failed the 10th grade test at least three times. Students may earn the concordant passing score prior to taking the FCAT Retake Reading or Mathematics examination three times, but they cannot substitute it in lieu of the passing FCAT score until they have taken the FCAT Retake Reading or Mathematics examination three times. In any case, students will receive a Certificate of Completion that allows for admittance in any state community college for which they have met all graduation requirements apart from passing the FCAT.

Students may also transfer their credits to a private or out-of-state school. Several high schools in North Carolina and South Carolina regularly market in Florida on radio stations annually during the spring and early summer, advertising their 'service' that is available to 'graduating' Florida high school students who for whatever reason failed to pass the FCAT and were unable to receive a high school diploma, despite having excellent grade point averages and having completed all course requirements for a high school diploma.

== Scoring ==
The FCAT is either machine-scored or hand-scored, depending on the section. Multiple-choice and gridded-response questions are machine-scored. Performance tasks, such as short-response, extended-response, and essay items, are hand-scored. Like several other standardized tests, the raw score does not directly reflect the final score; some questions are considered to be of a higher difficulty level than others and, therefore, carry more scoring weight. This type of scoring is called Item Response Theory (IRT).

== Criticism ==
Though the system was designed to reward public schools for excellence in teaching, many educators and community members have criticized the program, claiming that the program takes funding from schools which need it most. It has also been criticized by many students and teachers because the schools put too much emphasis on the FCAT and not enough on preparing students for the real world.

The FCAT tests have also come under fire from education groups and parents for encouraging teachers to teach students how to pass a test, rather than to teach students the fundamental material in the core subjects such as English. Another point of criticism on the FCAT is that all students of the same grade take the same test, despite the fact that different students are enrolled in different courses. To compensate for this, in many schools, teachers are directed to cover FCAT skills, regardless of what subject they are supposed to be covering.

Retired teacher and Lakeland political activist Carol Castagnero has been a harsh critic of the FCAT and ran for several offices to highlight her opposition to the exam. Castagnero called the test "unconstitutional" during her 2006 campaign for governor and stated during her 2008 congressional campaign that "children are being terrorized with a test called FCAT." Writers such as Diane Ravitch claim that high-stakes testing is driven by corporate interests rather than student and teacher interests.

== End-of-Course Assessments (EOC) ==
As of the 2010–11 school year, high school students in Florida in grades (9–12) will be required to pass End-of-Course exams for eligibility to obtain credit in the course in which the EOC exam was administered.

The End-of-Course Assessments are being used to replace the Florida Comprehensive Assessment Test (FCAT).The Algebra I EOC exam was the first end-of-course exam to be administered for Florida back in Spring 2011. As of now, the following EOC exams are being administered for Florida: Algebra I, Geometry, Biology, U.S. History. For the 2010–11 school year, the Algebra I EOC exam was worth 30% of the student's final grade. As for the 2011–12 school year, the Algebra I EOC exam was pass or fail. The students must achieve a 70% score (Level 3) or higher to be considered passing the Algebra I EOC exam. For 2012–13 school year, incoming ninth graders must pass not only the Algebra I EOC Exam, but also the Biology EOC to earn a high school diploma. The End-of-Course exams are used to ensure that the student has learned all the content in the course. End-of-Course exams are not required for students with specific learning disabilities.

All EOCs are administered school-wide throughout a week, ensuring no issues occur while students are signing into the program. The exams are taken on a computer, generally on a standard model for all students to guarantee fairness. If the test has not been completed within the 160-minute session, test-takers may continue working for the remainder of the school day.

== FCAT Explorer ==
FCAT Explorer was an internet-based tool designed to help Florida students in grades 3–11 pass the FCAT by focusing on mastery of the Sunshine State Standards through several interactive programs. Each student received a unique username and password to access these programs, and schools in Florida often set aside time during the day to work specifically on FCAT Explorer. The domain is now for sale.

== See also ==
- Florida Department of Education
- Education in Florida
