= 2019–20 Butler Bulldogs men's basketball team =

American college basketball season

2019–20 Butler Bulldogs men's basketball

CBE Hall of Fame Classic champions
- Conference: Big East Conference

Ranking
- Coaches: No. 21
- AP: No. 23
- Record: 22–9 (10–8 Big East)
- Head coach: LaVall Jordan (3rd season)
- Assistant coaches: Jeff Meyer (6th season); Emerson Kampen (4th season); Omar Lowery (3rd season)
- Home arena: Hinkle Fieldhouse

2019–20 Big East men's basketball standings
	Conf.				Overall
Team	W		L	PCT	W		L	PCT
No. 7 Creighton	13	–	5	.722	24	–	7	.774
No. 10 Villanova	13	–	5	.722	24	–	7	.774
No. 15 Seton Hall	13	–	5	.722	21	–	9	.700
Providence	12	–	6	.667	19	–	12	.613
No. 23 Butler	10	–	8	.556	22	–	9	.710
Marquette	8	–	10	.444	18	–	12	.600
Xavier	8	–	10	.444	19	–	13	.594
Georgetown	5	–	13	.278	15	–	17	.469
St. John's	5	–	13	.278	17	–	15	.531
DePaul	3	–	15	.167	16	–	16	.500
Note: The 2020 Big East tournament was cancelled at halftime of the first game of the quarterfinals due to the COVID-19 pandemic. Rankings from AP poll

The 2019–20 Butler Bulldogs men's basketball team represented Butler University in the 2019–20 NCAA Division I men's basketball season. They were coached by LaVall Jordan, in his third year as head coach of his alma mater. The Bulldogs played their home games at Hinkle Fieldhouse in Indianapolis, Indiana as members of the Big East Conference. The Bulldogs finished the season 23–9, 10–8 in Big East play which put them in fifth place. As the No. 5 seed in the Big East tournament, they were slated to play Providence in the second game of the quarterfinals, but the Tournament was cancelled at halftime of the first game due to the COVID-19 pandemic, along with the rest of the NCAA postseason.

== Previous season ==
The Bulldogs finished the 2018–19 season 16–17, 7–11 in Big East play which tied them for eighth place. As the No. 9 seed in the Big East tournament, they were defeated by Providence in the quarterfinals. The Bulldogs received an at-large bid to the NIT as the No. 5 seed in the TCU bracket. There they were defeated in the first round by Nebraska.

== Offseason ==
=== Departures ===
Name	Number	Pos.	Height	Weight	Year	Hometown	Notes
Nate Fowler	51	C	6'10"	240	Senior	Cincinnati, OH	Graduated
Paul Jorgensen	5	G	6'2"	185	RS Senior	New City, NY	Graduated
Joey Brunk	50	C	6'11"	250	RS Sophomore	Indianapolis, IN	Transferred to Indiana
Jerald Gillens-Butler	21	G/F	6'4"	230	Sophomore	Fort Lauderdale, FL	Transferred to Elon

=== Incoming transfers ===
Name	Number	Pos.	Height	Weight	Year	Hometown	Notes
Derrik Smits	21	C	7'1"	240	Graduate	Zionsville, IN	Transferred from Valparaiso. Immediately eligible to play as he graduated from Valparaiso.

=== 2019 Recruiting Class ===
College recruiting
Name	Hometown	School	Height	Weight	Commit date
John-Michael Mulloy; C	Carmel, IN	Carmel High School	6 ft 9 in (2.06 m)	195 lb (88 kg)	Sep 6, 2017
John-Michael Mulloy; C	Recruit ratings: Scout: Rivals: 247Sports: ESPN:				
Khalif Battle; SG	Metuchen, NJ	Trenton Catholic Academy	6 ft 4 in (1.93 m)	180 lb (82 kg)	May 4, 2018
Khalif Battle; SG	Recruit ratings: Scout: Rivals: 247Sports: ESPN:				
Overall recruit ranking:
Note: In many cases, Scout, Rivals, 247Sports, On3, and ESPN may conflict in their listings of height and weight.; In these cases, the average was taken. ESPN grades are on a 100-point scale.; Sources: "2019 Butler Commits". Rivals.; "2019 Team Ranking". Rivals.

== Roster ==
2019–20 Butler Bulldogs men's basketball team
Players
Coaches

Pos.	#	Name	Height	Weight	Year	Previous school	Hometown
C	21	Derrik Smits	7 ft 1 in (2.16 m)	235 lb (107 kg)	GS	Zionsville (Valparaiso)	Zionsville, IN
G/F	20	Henry Baddley	6 ft 4 in (1.93 m)	185 lb (84 kg)	Sr	St. Vincent–St. Mary	Wadsworth, OH
G	3	Kamar Baldwin	6 ft 1 in (1.85 m)	190 lb (86 kg)	Sr	Apalachee	Winder, GA
G	22	Sean McDermott	6 ft 6 in (1.98 m)	195 lb (88 kg)	RS Sr	Pendleton Heights	Pendleton, IN
F	25	Christian David (injured)	6 ft 6 in (1.98 m)	210 lb (95 kg)	Jr	Vermont Academy	Milton, Ontario
G	0	Campbell Donovan (injured) (W)	5 ft 11 in (1.8 m)	180 lb (82 kg)	Jr	Bishop Dwenger	Fort Wayne, IN
G	2	Aaron Thompson	6 ft 2 in (1.88 m)	190 lb (86 kg)	Jr	Paul VI Catholic	Glenn Dale, MD
F	10	Bryce Nze	6 ft 7 in (2.01 m)	225 lb (102 kg)	RS Jr	Arrowhead (Milwaukee)	Hartland, WI
F	1	Jordan Tucker	6 ft 7 in (2.01 m)	220 lb (100 kg)	Jr	Wheeler (Duke)	White Plains, NY
F	33	Bryce Golden	6 ft 9 in (2.06 m)	245 lb (111 kg)	So	St. James School	Winchester, VA
F	24	Markeese Hastings	6 ft 7 in (2.01 m)	200 lb (91 kg)	RS Fr	Godwin Heights	Wyoming, MI
F	30	Mike Parker (W) (redshirt)	6 ft 6 in (1.98 m)	215 lb (98 kg)	RS Fr	Coastal Christian	Wilmington, NC
G	4	Khalif Battle	6 ft 5 in (1.96 m)	175 lb (79 kg)	Fr	Trenton Catholic	Edison, NJ
F/C	35	John-Michael Mulloy	6 ft 10 in (2.08 m)	225 lb (102 kg)	Fr	Carmel	Carmel, IN

Head coach

- LaVall Jordan (Butler)

Assistant coach(es)

- Jeff Meyer (Taylor)
- Emerson Kampen (Butler)
- Omar Lowery (Concordia (WI))

Legend

- (C) Team captain
- (S) Suspended
- (I) Ineligible
- (W) Walk-on
- Injured
- Current redshirt

Roster
Last update: July 12, 2018

== Schedule and results ==
- Date time, TV	Rank^{#}	Opponent^{#}	Result	Record	High points	High rebounds	High assists	Site (attendance) city, state
  Exhibition
  October 26, 2019*; 7:30 p.m.		IU Kokomo	W 70–40	–	18 – McDermott	7 – Tucker	6 – Thompson	Hinkle Fieldhouse (7,392); Indianapolis, IN
  November 1, 2019*; 7:00 p.m.		Indianapolis	W 79–47	–	29 – McDermott	11 – Nze	5 – Thompson	Hinkle Fieldhouse (7,527); Indianapolis, IN
  Non-conference regular season
  November 6, 2019*; 6:30 p.m., FS2		IUPUI	W 80–47	1–0	26 – McDermott	11 – Nze	9 – Thompson	Hinkle Fieldhouse (7,706); Indianapolis, IN
  November 9, 2019*; 7:00 p.m., FSN		New Orleans	W 79–53	2–0	18 – Nze	10 – Nze	10 – Thompson	Hinkle Fieldhouse (9,118); Indianapolis, IN
  November 12, 2019*; 8:30 p.m., FS1		Minnesota; Gavitt Tipoff Games	W 64–56	3–0	27 – Baldwin	8 – Nze	3 – Thompson	Hinkle Fieldhouse (7,879); Indianapolis, IN
  November 16, 2019*; 8:00 p.m., FS2		Wofford; Hall of Fame Classic campus game	W 80–61	4–0	23 – Baldwin	7 – Tied	7 – Thompson	Hinkle Fieldhouse (8,054); Indianapolis, IN
  November 22, 2019*; 7:00 p.m., FS1		Morehead State; CBE Hall of Fame Classic campus game	W 68–50	5–0	17 – Baldwin	8 – Baldwin	5 – Thompson	Hinkle Fieldhouse (7,707); Indianapolis, IN
  November 25, 2019*; 7:00 p.m., ESPNU		vs. Missouri; CBE Hall of Fame Classic semifinal	W 63–52	6–0	13 – Tied	7 – Nze	7 – Thompson	Sprint Center; Kansas City, MO
  November 26, 2019*; 9:30 p.m., ESPN2		vs. Stanford; CBE Hall of Fame Classic championship	W 68–67	7–0	22 – Baldwin	8 – Nze	4 – Thompson	Sprint Center (8,506); Kansas City, MO
  December 3, 2019*; 7:00 p.m., SECN	No. 24	at Ole Miss	W 67–58	8–0	31 – Baldwin	7 – Nze	3 – Tied	The Pavilion at Ole Miss (7,348); Oxford, MS
  December 7, 2019*; 12:00 p.m., FOX	No. 24	Florida	W 76–62	9–0	16 – Tied	7 – McDermott	7 – Thompson	Hinkle Fieldhouse (9,303); Indianapolis, IN
  December 10, 2019*; 9:00 pm, ESPN2	No. 18	at No. 11 Baylor; Big East/Big 12 Battle	L 52–53	9–1	19 – Baldwin	8 – Thompson	3 – Baldwin	Ferrell Center (7,270); Waco, TX
  December 14, 2019*; 12:00 p.m., FS1	No. 18	Southern	W 66–41	10–1	12 – Golden	7 – Nze	8 – Thompson	Hinkle Fieldhouse (7,635); Indianapolis, IN
  December 21, 2019*; 2:30 p.m., BTN	No. 17	vs. Purdue; Crossroads Classic	W 70–61	11–1	14 – Golden	6 – Nze	6 – Thompson	Bankers Life Fieldhouse (18,538); Indianapolis, IN
  December 28, 2019*; 4:00 p.m., FS1	No. 12	Louisiana–Monroe	W 67–36	12–1	16 – Smits	8 – Baldwin	6 – Baldwin	Hinkle Fieldhouse (8,040); Indianapolis, IN
  Big East regular season
  December 31, 2019; 7:30 p.m., FS1	No. 11	at St. John's	W 60–58	13–1 (1–0)	19 – Baldwin	12 – Nze	5 – Nze	Carnesecca Arena (3,816); Queens, NY
  January 4, 2020; 12:00 p.m., FS1	No. 11	Creighton	W 71–57	14–1 (2–0)	20 – Baldwin	11 – McDermott	2 – Tied	Hinkle Fieldhouse (9,129); Indianapolis, IN
  January 10, 2020; 9:00 p.m., FS1	No. 6	at Providence	W 70–58	15–1 (3–0)	17 – Tied	9 – Golden	3 – Thompson	Dunkin' Donuts Center (10,674); Providence, RI
  January 15, 2020; 6:30 p.m., FS1	No. 5	No. 18 Seton Hall	L 70–78	15–2 (3–1)	19 – Baldwin	10 – Tucker	6 – Baldwin	Hinkle Fieldhouse (8,823); Indianapolis, IN
  January 18, 2020; 1:00 p.m., FSN	No. 5	at DePaul	L 66–79	15–3 (3–2)	16 – Baldwin	8 – McDermott	6 – Thompson	Wintrust Arena (8,967); Chicago, IL
  January 21, 2020; 7:00 p.m., CBSSN	No. 13	at No. 9 Villanova	L 61–76	15–4 (3–3)	21 – Baldwin	12 – Nze	5 – Tied	Finneran Pavilion (6,501); Villanova, PA
  January 24, 2020; 9:00 p.m., FS1	No. 13	Marquette	W 89–85 ^{OT}	16–4 (4–3)	31 – Baldwin	9 – McDermott	5 – Baldwin	Hinkle Fieldhouse (9,204); Indianapolis, IN
  January 28, 2020; 9:00 p.m., CBSSN	No. 16	at Georgetown	W 69–64	17–4 (5–3)	25 – McDermott	8 – McDermott	6 – Baldwin	Capital One Arena (5,329); Washington, D.C.
  February 1, 2020; 2:00 p.m., FS1	No. 16	Providence	L 61–65	17–5 (5–4)	14 – Baldwin	8 – Tucker	5 – Baldwin	Hinkle Fieldhouse (9,132); Indianapolis, IN
  February 5, 2020; 6:30 p.m., FS1	No. 19	No. 10 Villanova	W 79–76	18–5 (6–4)	21 – McDermott	8 – Tied	3 – Tied	Hinkle Fieldhouse (8,814); Indianapolis, IN
  February 9, 2020; 12:00 p.m., FS1	No. 19	at Marquette	L 57–76	18–6 (6–5)	23 – Baldwin	6 – Tied	7 – Thompson	Fiserv Forum (17,526); Milwaukee, WI
  February 12, 2020; 6:30 p.m., CBSSN	No. 19	Xavier	W 66–61	19–6 (7–5)	14 – McDermott	6 – McDermott	5 – Baldwin	Hinkle Fieldhouse (8,878); Indianapolis, IN
  February 15, 2020; 2:30 p.m., FOX	No. 19	Georgetown	L 66–73	19–7 (7–6)	17 – Baldwin	7 – McDermott	6 – Baldwin	Hinkle Fieldhouse (9,158); Indianapolis, IN
  February 19, 2020; 6:30 p.m., FS1	No. 21	at No. 16 Seton Hall	L 72–74	19–8 (7–7)	20 – Baldwin	10 – Nze	6 – Baldwin	Prudential Center (10,481); Newark, NJ
  February 23, 2020; 4:00 p.m., FS1	No. 21	at No. 15 Creighton	L 59–81	19–9 (7–8)	13 – Baddley	7 – Nze	4 – Battle	CHI Health Center Omaha (18,148); Omaha, NE
  February 29, 2020; 6:30 p.m., FS1		DePaul	W 60–42	20–9 (8–8)	13 – Tied	8 – Baldwin	5 – Baldwin	Hinkle Fieldhouse (9,234); Indianapolis, IN
  March 4, 2020; 7:00 p.m., CBSSN		St. John's	W 77–55	21–9 (9–8)	16 – McDermott	14 – McDermott	5 – Thompson	Hinkle Fieldhouse (8,675); Indianapolis, IN
  March 7, 2020; 8:30 p.m., FS1		at Xavier	W 72–71	22–9 (10–8)	36 – Baldwin	8 – Nze	3 – Tied	Cintas Center; Cincinnati, OH
  Big East tournament
  March 12, 2020; 2:30 pm, FS1	(5) No. 24	vs. (4) Providence; Quarterfinal	Big East tournament canceled					Madison Square Garden; New York, NY
  *Non-conference game. ^{#}Rankings from AP Poll. (#) Tournament seedings in parentheses. All times are in Eastern Time.

== Rankings ==
Ranking movements Legend: ██ Increase in ranking ██ Decrease in ranking — = Not ranked RV = Received votes
	Week																			
Poll	Pre	1	2	3	4	5	6	7	8	9	10	11	12	13	14	15	16	17	18	Final
AP	—	—	RV	RV	24	18	17	12	11	6	5	13	16	19	19	21	RV	RV	24	23
Coaches	—	—	RV	RV	24	19	16	11	10	6	5	12	17	19	20	23	RV	25	21	21

*AP does not release post-NCAA tournament rankings
^Coaches did not release a Week 1 poll.

== Awards ==
Name	Award(s)
Kamar Baldwin	Preseason All-Big East First Team; Big East Player of the Week – Jan. 27

== See also ==
2019–20 Butler Bulldogs women's basketball team
