= 2019–20 DePaul Blue Demons men's basketball team =

American college basketball season

2019–20 DePaul Blue Demons men's basketball
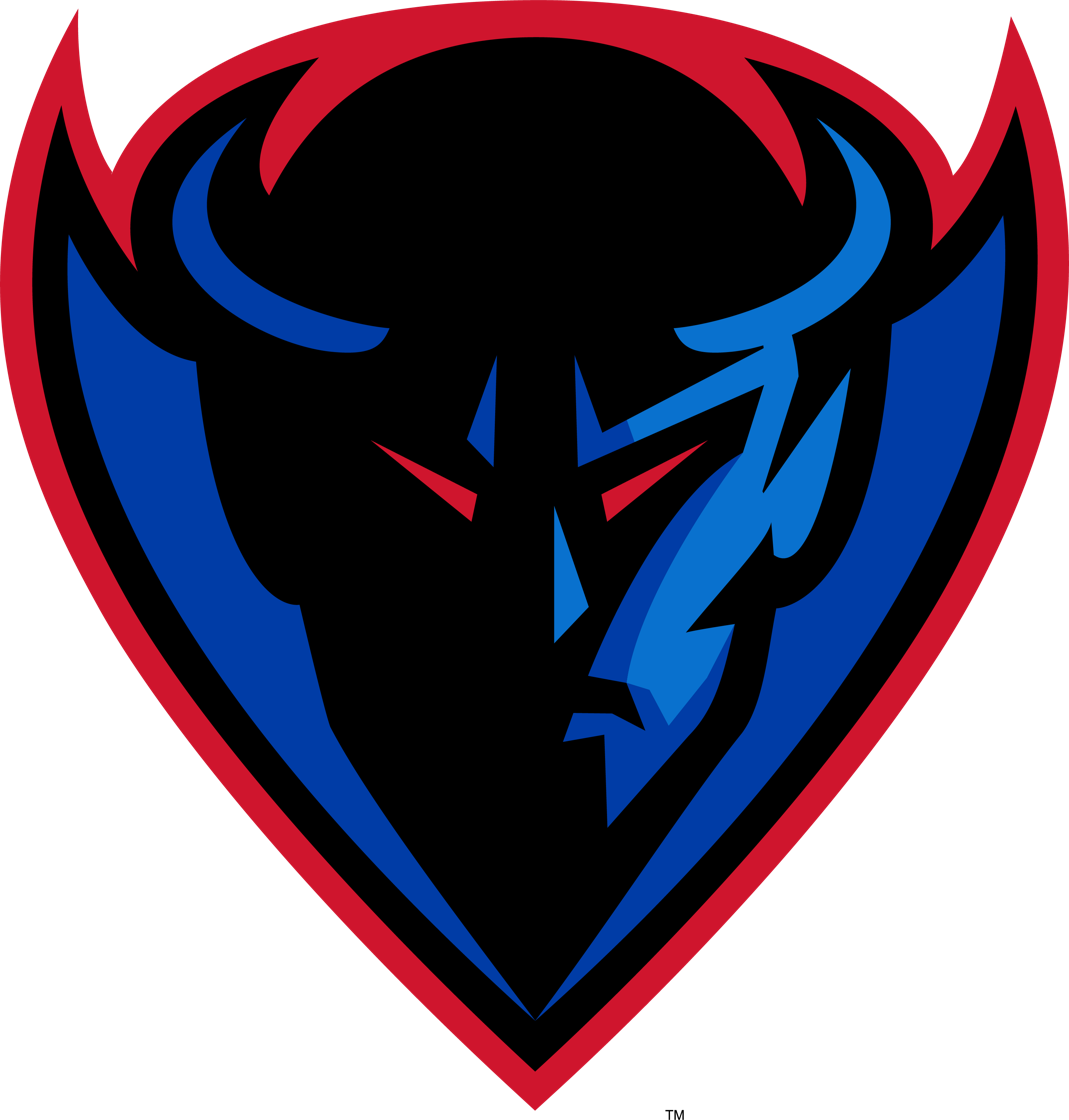
- Conference: Big East Conference
- Record: 16–16 (3–15 Big East)
- Head coach: Dave Leitao (5th straight, 8th overall season)
- Assistant coaches: Tim Anderson (3rd season); Shane Heirman (3rd season); Marc Hsu (1st season)
- Home arena: Wintrust Arena

2019–20 Big East men's basketball standings
	Conf.				Overall
Team	W		L	PCT	W		L	PCT
No. 7 Creighton	13	–	5	.722	24	–	7	.774
No. 10 Villanova	13	–	5	.722	24	–	7	.774
No. 15 Seton Hall	13	–	5	.722	21	–	9	.700
Providence	12	–	6	.667	19	–	12	.613
No. 23 Butler	10	–	8	.556	22	–	9	.710
Marquette	8	–	10	.444	18	–	12	.600
Xavier	8	–	10	.444	19	–	13	.594
Georgetown	5	–	13	.278	15	–	17	.469
St. John's	5	–	13	.278	17	–	15	.531
DePaul	3	–	15	.167	16	–	16	.500
Note: The 2020 Big East tournament was cancelled at halftime of the first game of the quarterfinals due to the COVID-19 pandemic. Rankings from AP poll

The 2019–20 DePaul Blue Demons men's basketball team represented DePaul University during the 2019–20 NCAA Division I men's basketball season. They were led by fifth-year (eighth overall with DePaul) head coach Dave Leitao and played their home games at Wintrust Arena in Chicago as members of the Big East Conference. The Demons finished the season 16–16, 3–15 in Big East play to finish in last place. They defeated Xavier in the first round of the Big East tournament before the remaining tournament was canceled due to the ongoing COVID-19 pandemic.

== Previous season ==
The Blue Demons finished the 2018–19 season 19–17, 7–11 in Big East play to finish in a three-way tie for last place. As the No. 10 seed in the Big East tournament, they lost in the first round to St. John's. They received a bid to the College Basketball Invitational where they defeated Central Michigan, Longwood, and Coastal Carolina to advance to the championship series against South Florida. There, in a best-of-three series, they lost to South Florida two games to one.

== Offseason ==
=== Departures ===
Name	Number	Pos.	Height	Weight	Year	Hometown	Reason for departure
Eli Cain	11	G	6'6"	200	Senior	Willingboro, NJ	Graduated
Carte'Are Gordon	15	F	6'9"	230	RS Freshman	Saint Louis, MO	Transferred to Northwest Florida State
George Maslennikov	22	F	6'10"	234	Freshman	Odesa, Ukraine	Transferred
Femi Olujobi	25	F	6'8"	233	RS Senior	Long Island, NY	Graduated
Max Strus	31	G	6'6"	205	RS Senior	Hickory Hills, IL	Graduated
John Diener	33	G	6'5"	203	Freshman	Cedarburg, WI	Transferred to UC San Diego

=== Incoming transfers ===
Name	Number	Pos.	Height	Weight	Year	Hometown	Previous School
Charlie Moore	11	G	5'11	180	RS Junior	Chicago, IL	Kansas

=== 2019 recruiting class ===
College recruiting
Name	Hometown	School	Height	Weight	Commit date
Romeo Weems; PF	New Haven, MI	New Haven HS	6 ft 7 in (2.01 m)	215 lb (98 kg)	May 22, 2018
Romeo Weems; PF	Recruit ratings: Scout: Rivals: 247Sports: (88)				
Markese Jacobs; PG	Chicago, IL	Uplift Community HS	5 ft 11 in (1.80 m)	170 lb (77 kg)	Oct 7, 2018
Markese Jacobs; PG	Recruit ratings: Scout: Rivals: 247Sports: (88)				
Nick Ongenda; C	Mississauga, ON	Southwest Christian (AR)	6 ft 10 in (2.08 m)	200 lb (91 kg)	Jul 1, 2019
Nick Ongenda; C	Recruit ratings: Scout: Rivals: 247Sports: (82)				
Oscar Lopez; SG	Garden Grove, CA	Veritas Prep	6 ft 4 in (1.93 m)	210 lb (95 kg)	Oct 3, 2018
Oscar Lopez; SG	Recruit ratings: Scout: Rivals: 247Sports: (NR)				
Overall recruit ranking:
Note: In many cases, Scout, Rivals, 247Sports, On3, and ESPN may conflict in their listings of height and weight.; In these cases, the average was taken. ESPN grades are on a 100-point scale.; Sources: "2019 DePaul Signees". Rivals.; "2019 DePaul Signees". ESPN.; "2019 Team Ranking". Rivals.

== Roster ==
2019–20 DePaul Blue Demons men's basketball team
Players
Coaches

Pos.	#	Name	Height	Weight	Year	Previous school	Hometown
G	0	Markese Jacobs	5 ft 11 in (1.8 m)	185 lb (84 kg)	Fr	Uplift Community	Chicago, IL
F	1	Romeo Weems	6 ft 7 in (2.01 m)	210 lb (95 kg)	Fr	New Haven	Detroit, MI
F	2	Jaylen Butz	6 ft 9 in (2.06 m)	224 lb (102 kg)	Jr	North Side	Fort Wayne, IN
G	3	Devin Gage	6 ft 2 in (1.88 m)	190 lb (86 kg)	RS Jr	Curie	Chicago, IL
F	4	Paul Reed	6 ft 9 in (2.06 m)	220 lb (100 kg)	Jr	Wekiva	Orlando, FL
G	5	Jalen Coleman-Lands	6 ft 4 in (1.93 m)	185 lb (84 kg)	RS Sr	La Lumiere School (Illinois)	Indianapolis, IN
G	10	Lyrik Shreiner	6 ft 3 in (1.91 m)	195 lb (88 kg)	RS Sr	Hillcrest Academy (TCU/CSUN)	Phoenix, AZ
G	11	Charlie Moore	5 ft 11 in (1.8 m)	180 lb (82 kg)	RS Jr	Morgan Park (Kansas/California)	Chicago, IL
G	12	Jason Malonga (W)	6 ft 4 in (1.93 m)	195 lb (88 kg)	Jr	Benet Academy	Bolingbrook, IL
F	13	Darious Hall	6 ft 7 in (2.01 m)	215 lb (98 kg)	RS So	Mills University Studies (Arkansas)	Little Rock, AR
C	14	Nick Ongenda	6 ft 11 in (2.11 m)	210 lb (95 kg)	Fr	Southwest Christian Academy (AR)	Mississauga, Ontario
G	15	Oscar Lopez Jr.	6 ft 4 in (1.93 m)	200 lb (91 kg)	Fr	Hillcrest Prep Academy (AZ)	Cypress, CA
G	20	Brendan Favre (W)	6 ft 5 in (1.96 m)	170 lb (77 kg)	So	IMG Academy (FL)	Vevey, Switzerland
G	21	Flynn Cameron	6 ft 3 in (1.91 m)	198 lb (90 kg)	RS So	Hillcrest Christian College	Auckland, New Zealand
F	23	Mick Sullivan (W)	6 ft 8 in (2.03 m)	241 lb (109 kg)	So	Marmion Academy	Aurora, IL
G	30	Sullivan Menard (W)	6 ft 3 in (1.91 m)	180 lb (82 kg)	Fr	Colony	Wasilla, AK
G	35	Pantelis Xidias (W)	5 ft 10 in (1.78 m)	165 lb (75 kg)	Jr	La Lumiere	Michigan City, IN

Head coach

- Dave Leitao (Northeastern)

Assistant coach(es)

- Tim Anderson (Oklahoma Panhandle State)
- Shane Heirman (Tulsa)
- Marc Hsu (Cabrini)

Legend

- (C) Team captain
- (S) Suspended
- (I) Ineligible
- (W) Walk-on
- Injured
- Current redshirt

Roster
Last update: 2019-10-30

== Schedule and results ==
Date time, TV	Rank^{#}	Opponent^{#}	Result	Record	High points	High rebounds	High assists	Site (attendance) city, state
Exhibition
October 29, 2019*; 7:30 pm		Marian (WI)	W 110–22	–	19 – Reed	8 – Tied	7 – Moore	Wintrust Arena; Chicago, IL
Non-conference regular season
November 5, 2019*; 8:00 pm, FS2		Alcorn State	W 72–54	1-0	17 – Reed	11 – Reed	5 – Moore	Wintrust Arena (3,483); Chicago, IL
November 6, 2019*; 7:30 pm, FS2		Chicago	W 84–55	2–0	17 – Moore	6 – Moore	7 – Tied	Wintrust Arena (3,436); Chicago, IL
November 8, 2019*; 7:00 pm, FS2		Fairleigh Dickinson	W 70–59	3–0	27 – Moore	11 – Reed	4 – Tied	Wintrust Arena (3,945); Chicago, IL
November 11, 2019*; 7:00 pm, FS1		at Iowa; Gavitt Tipoff Games	W 93–78	4–0	25 – Reed	12 – Reed	5 – Tied	Carver-Hawkeye Arena (9,961); Iowa City, IA
November 16, 2019*; 12:00 pm, FSN/WCIU-TV		Cornell	W 75–54	5–0	18 – Reed	12 – Red	4 – Weems	Wintrust Arena (3,837); Chicago, IL
November 23, 2019*; 11:00 am, ACCNX		at Boston College	W 72–67	6–0	24 – Moore	10 – Tied	8 – Moore	Conte Forum (4,560); Chestnut Hill, MA
November 26, 2019*; 7:00 pm, FS1		Central Michigan	W 88–75	7–0	23 – Reed	11 – Tied	13 – Moore	Wintrust Arena (4,097); Chicago, IL
November 29, 2019*; 2:00 pm, FS1		at Minnesota	W 73–68	8–0	21 – Moore	9 – Reed	12 – Moore	Williams Arena (10,260); Minneapolis, MN
December 4, 2019*; 7:30 pm, FS1		Texas Tech; Big East/Big 12 Battle	W 65–60 ^{OT}	9–0	18 – Tied	8 – Hall	10 – Moore	Wintrust Arena (5,493); Chicago, IL
December 8, 2019*; 4:00 pm, FS1		Buffalo	L 69–74	9–1	17 – Coleman-Lands	18 – Reed	6 – Moore	Wintrust Arena (4,419); Chicago, IL
December 14, 2019*; 1:00 pm, FS1		UIC	W 86–65	10–1	26 – Moore	12 – Reed	5 – Moore	Wintrust Arena (4,620); Chicago, IL
December 18, 2019*; 6:00 pm, ESPN3		at Cleveland State	W 73–65	11–1	19 – Reed	10 – Reed	4 – Coleman-Lands	Wolstein Center (991); Cleveland, OH
December 21, 2019*; 7:30 pm, CBSSN		Northwestern	W 83–78	12–1	25 – Moore	12 – Reed	10 – Moore	Wintrust Arena (6,357); Chicago, IL
Big East regular season
December 30, 2019; 7:30 pm, FS1		Seton Hall	L 66–74	12–2 (0–1)	17 – Reed	11 – Butz	4 – Moore	Wintrust Arena (6,364); Chicago, IL
January 4, 2020; 2:00 pm, FS1		Providence	L 65–66	12–3 (0–2)	24 – Reed	15 – Reed	5 – Moore	Wintrust Arena (4,945); Chicago, IL
January 11, 2020; 11:00 am, FSN/WCIU-TV		at St. John's	L 67–74	12–4 (0–3)	17 – Butz	12 – Reed	12 – Moore	Madison Square Garden (6,636); New York City, NY
January 14, 2020; 7:30 pm, FS1		at No. 14 Villanova	L 75–79 ^{OT}	12–5 (0–4)	29 – Moore	15 – Reed	6 – Moore	Finneran Pavilion (6,501); Villanova, PA
January 18, 2020; 12:00 pm, FSN/WCIU-TV		No. 5 Butler	W 79–66	13–5 (1–4)	23 – Reed	9 – Reed	8 – Moore	Wintrust Arena (8,967); Chicago, IL
January 22, 2020; 8:00 pm, CBSSN		Creighton	L 68–83	13–6 (1–5)	22 – Reed	12 – Reed	7 – Moore	Wintrust Arena (4,535); Chicago, IL
January 25, 2020; 1:00 pm, FS1		St. John's	L 66–79	13–7 (1–6)	20 – Moore	12 – Reed	5 – Moore	Wintrust Arena (5,950); Chicago, IL
January 29, 2020; 5:30 pm, FS1		at No. 10 Seton Hall	L 57–64	13–8 (1–7)	14 – Moore	7 – Reed	4 – Moore	Prudential Center (9,302); Newark, NJ
February 1, 2020; 1:00 pm, FSN/WCIU-TV		at Marquette	L 72–76	13–9 (1–8)	21 – Moore	7 – Reed	8 – Moore	Fiserv Forum (17,781); Milwaukee, WI
February 4, 2020; 8:00 pm, FS1		Xavier	L 59–67	13–10 (1–9)	18 – Reed	9 – Reed	8 – Moore	Wintrust Arena (4,526); Chicago, IL
February 8, 2020; 11:00 am, FSN/WCIU-TV		at Georgetown	L 72–76	13–11 (1–10)	17 – Coleman-Lands	13 – Reed	9 – Moore	Capital One Arena (10,308); Washington, D.C.
February 15, 2020; 6:30 pm, FS1		at No. 23 Creighton	L 64–93	13–12 (1–11)	20 – Moore	5 – Weems	5 – Moore	CHI Health Center Omaha (17,865); Omaha, NE
February 19, 2020; 8:00 pm, CBSSN		No. 12 Villanova	L 71–91	13–13 (1–12)	17 – Coleman-Lands	7 – Reed	4 – Lopez Jr.	Wintrust Arena (5,451); Chicago, IL
February 22, 2020; 8:00 pm, FS1		Georgetown	W 74–68	14–13 (2–12)	20 – Moore	10 – Reed	7 – Moore	Wintrust Arena (6,045); Chicago, IL
February 25, 2020; 6:00 pm, CBSSN		at Xavier	L 67–78	14–14 (2–13)	16 – Weems	16 – Reed	4 – Lopez Jr.	Cintas Center (10,224); Cincinnati, OH
February 29, 2020; 5:30 pm, FS1		at Butler	L 42–60	14–15 (2–14)	8 – Tied	9 – Butz	2 – Hall	Hinkle Fieldhouse (9,233); Indianapolis, IN
March 3, 2020; 7:00 pm, FS1		Marquette	W 69–68	15–15 (3–14)	15 – Moore	11 – Weems	3 – Moore	Wintrust Arena (6,901); Chicago, IL
March 7, 2020; 5:30 pm, FS1		at Providence	L 55–93	15–16 (3–15)	14 – Moore	6 – Tied	6 – Moore	Dunkin' Donuts Center (12,103); Providence, RI
Big East tournament
March 11, 2020; 8:30 pm, FS1	(10)	vs. (7) Xavier; First round	W 71–67	16–16	23 – Reed	12 – Reed	9 – Moore	Madison Square Garden (17,534); New York City, NY
Canceled
*Non-conference game. ^{#}Rankings from AP Poll. (#) Tournament seedings in parentheses. All times are in Central Time.

== Ranking ==
Ranking movements Legend: RV = Received votes
	Week																				
Poll	Pre	1	2	3	4	5	6	7	8	9	10	11	12	13	14	15	16	17	18	19	Final
AP						RV	RV	RV													
Coaches					RV	RV	RV	RV													

*AP does not release post-NCAA Tournament rankings
