= 2019–20 Marquette Golden Eagles men's basketball team =

American college basketball season

2019–20 Marquette Golden Eagles men's basketball
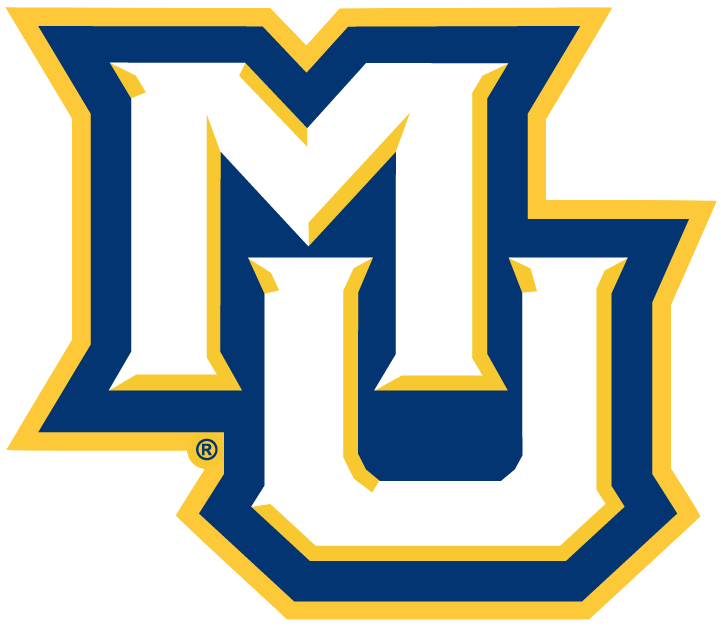
- Conference: Big East
- Record: 18–12 (8–10 Big East)
- Head coach: Steve Wojciechowski (6th season)
- Associate head coach: Stan Johnson (5th season)
- Assistant coaches: Dwayne Killings (2nd season); Jake Presutti (1st season)
- Home arena: Fiserv Forum

2019–20 Big East men's basketball standings
	Conf.				Overall
Team	W		L	PCT	W		L	PCT
No. 7 Creighton	13	–	5	.722	24	–	7	.774
No. 10 Villanova	13	–	5	.722	24	–	7	.774
No. 15 Seton Hall	13	–	5	.722	21	–	9	.700
Providence	12	–	6	.667	19	–	12	.613
No. 23 Butler	10	–	8	.556	22	–	9	.710
Marquette	8	–	10	.444	18	–	12	.600
Xavier	8	–	10	.444	19	–	13	.594
Georgetown	5	–	13	.278	15	–	17	.469
St. John's	5	–	13	.278	17	–	15	.531
DePaul	3	–	15	.167	16	–	16	.500
Note: The 2020 Big East tournament was cancelled at halftime of the first game of the quarterfinals due to the COVID-19 pandemic. Rankings from AP poll

The 2019–20 Marquette Golden Eagles men's basketball team represented Marquette University in the 2019–20 NCAA Division I men's basketball season. The Golden Eagles, led by sixth-year head coach Steve Wojciechowski, played their home games at Fiserv Forum as members of the Big East Conference.

== Previous season ==
The Golden Eagles finished the 2018–19 season 24–10, 12–6 in Big East play to finish in second place. As the No. 2 seed in the Big East tournament, they defeated St. John’s in the quarterfinals before losing to Seton Hall in the semifinals. They received an at-large bid to the NCAA tournament as the No. 5 seed in the West region and were upset by Murray State in the First Round.

The season marked the first season for Marquette at the new Fiserv Forum in downtown Milwaukee.

== Offseason ==
=== Coaching changes ===
In July 2019, associate head coach Brett Nelson was hired as the new head coach at Holy Cross. As a result, Wojciechowski elevated Jake Presutti from director of basketball operations to assistant coach.

=== Departures ===
Name	Number	Pos.	Height	Weight	Year	Hometown	Reason for departure
Sam Hauser	10	G/F	6'8"	225	Junior	Stevens Point, WI	Transferred to Virginia
Matt Heldt	12	C	6'10"	240	Senior	Neenah, WI	Graduated
Joseph Chartouny	21	G	6'3"	200	Grad Student	Montreal, QC	Graduated
Joey Hauser	22	F	6'9"	230	RS Freshman	Stevens Point, WI	Transferred to Michigan State
Cam Marotta	52	G	5'10"	175	Senior	Mequon, WI	Graduated

=== Incoming transfers ===
Name	Number	Pos.	Height	Weight	Year	Hometown	Previous school
Jayce Johnson	34	F	7'0"	245	Grad Student	Mission Viejo, CA	Utah

=== 2019 recruiting class ===
College recruiting information
Name	Hometown	School	Height	Weight	Commit date
Symir Torrence; CG	Syracuse, New York	Vermont Academy	6 ft 3 in (1.91 m)	170 lb (77 kg)	Jan 6, 2019
Symir Torrence; CG	Recruit ratings: Scout: Rivals: 247Sports: (83)				
Dexter Akanno; CG	Blairstown, NJ	Blair Academy	6 ft 4 in (1.93 m)	200 lb (91 kg)	Sep 6, 2018
Dexter Akanno; CG	Recruit ratings: Scout: Rivals: 247Sports: (NR)				
Overall recruit ranking:
Note: In many cases, Scout, Rivals, 247Sports, On3, and ESPN may conflict in their listings of height and weight.; In these cases, the average was taken. ESPN grades are on a 100-point scale.; Sources: "2019 Team Ranking". Rivals.

== Roster ==
2019–20 Marquette Golden Eagles men's basketball team
Players
Coaches

Pos.	#	Name	Height	Weight	Year	Previous school	Hometown
G	0	Markus Howard	5 ft 11 in (1.8 m)	180 lb (82 kg)	Sr	Findlay Prep	Chandler, Arizona
F	1	Brendan Bailey	6 ft 8 in (2.03 m)	200 lb (91 kg)	So	American Fork HS	Salt Lake City, Utah
G/F	2	Sacar Anim	6 ft 5 in (1.96 m)	210 lb (95 kg)	RS Sr	DeLaSalle HS	Minneapolis, Minnesota
F	4	Theo John	6 ft 9 in (2.06 m)	255 lb (116 kg)	Jr	Champlin Park HS	Minneapolis, Minnesota
G	5	Greg Elliott	6 ft 3 in (1.91 m)	185 lb (84 kg)	RS So	East English Village Prep	Detroit, Michigan
G	10	Symir Torrence	6 ft 3 in (1.91 m)	195 lb (88 kg)	Fr	Vermont Academy	Syracuse, New York
G	12	Dexter Akanno	6 ft 4 in (1.93 m)	210 lb (95 kg)	Fr	Blair Academy	Valencia, California
F	13	Ike Eke	6 ft 9 in (2.06 m)	220 lb (100 kg)	RS So	University of Detroit Jesuit HS	Lagos, Nigeria
F	23	Jamal Cain	6 ft 7 in (2.01 m)	200 lb (91 kg)	Jr	Cornerstone Health & Tech HS	Pontiac, Michigan
G	25	Koby McEwen	6 ft 4 in (1.93 m)	205 lb (93 kg)	RS Jr	Wasatch Academy; Utah State	Toronto, Ontario
F	34	Jayce Johnson	7 ft 0 in (2.13 m)	245 lb (111 kg)	GS	Santa Monica HS; Utah	Mission Viejo, California
F	40	Tommy Gardiner (W)	6 ft 7 in (2.01 m)	210 lb (95 kg)	So	Maine South HS	Park Ridge, Illinois
G	41	Brendan Carney (W)	6 ft 2 in (1.88 m)	175 lb (79 kg)	Fr	Sacred Heart Prep	Menlo Park, California
F	42	Michael Kennedy (W)	6 ft 6 in (1.98 m)	185 lb (84 kg)	Fr	Homestead HS	Mequon, Wisconsin

Head coach

- Steve Wojciechowski (Duke)

Assistant coach(es)

- Stan Johnson (Southern Utah)
- Dwayne Killings (Hampton)
- Jake Presutti (Syracuse)

Legend

- (C) Team captain
- (S) Suspended
- (I) Ineligible
- (W) Walk-on
- Injured
- Current redshirt

Roster
Last update: 01-31-2020

== Schedule and results ==
Date time, TV	Rank^{#}	Opponent^{#}	Result	Record	High points	High rebounds	High assists	Site (attendance) city, state
Exhibition
October 29, 2019*; 7:00 pm		St. Norbert	W 88–51	–	15 – Bailey	9 – Morrow	7 – McEwen	Fiserv Forum (12,436); Milwaukee, WI
Non-conference regular season
November 5, 2019*; 7:00 pm, FCSC/FSWI		Loyola (MD)	W 88–53	1–0	38 – Howard	8 – John	4 – Tied	Fiserv Forum (13,103); Milwaukee, WI
November 13, 2019*; 8:00 pm, FS1		Purdue; Gavitt Tipoff Games	W 65–55	2–0	23 – McEwen	9 – John	4 – Tied	Fiserv Forum (15,659); Milwaukee, WI
November 17, 2019*; 12:00 pm, FS1		at Wisconsin; Rivalry	L 61–77	2–1	19 – McEwen	7 – McEwen	3 – McEwen	Kohl Center (17,287); Madison, WI
November 23, 2019*; 1:00 pm, FS2		Robert Morris	W 66–62	3–1	14 – Anim	6 – Elliott	5 – McEwen	Fiserv Forum (14,136); Milwaukee, WI
November 28, 2019*; 5:30 pm, ESPNU		vs. Davidson; Orlando Invitational Quarterfinals	W 73–63	4–1	40 – Howard	7 – Cain	2 – Tied	HP Field House (2,084); Orlando, FL
November 29, 2019*; 3:30 pm, ESPN2		vs. USC; Orlando Invitational Semifinals	W 101–79	5–1	51 – Howard	7 – Tied	3 – Tied	HP Field House (2,457); Orlando, FL
December 1, 2019*; 12:00 pm, ESPN		vs. No. 5 Maryland; Orlando Invitational Championship	L 63–84	5–2	27 – Bailey	11 – Johnson	5 – McEwen	HP Field House (2,439); Orlando, FL
December 4, 2019*; 8:00 pm, FS2		Jacksonville	W 75–56	6–2	19 – Anim	12 – Cain	4 – Tied	Fiserv Forum (12,852); Milwaukee, WI
December 7, 2019*; 8:00 pm, ESPN2		at Kansas State; Big East/Big 12 Battle	W 73–65	7–2	19 – Howard	9 – Cain	4 – Tied	Bramlage Coliseum (10,073); Manhattan, KS
December 17, 2019*; 7:00 pm, FSN		Grambling State	W 93–72	8–2	26 – Howard	6 – Howard	7 – McEwen	Fiserv Forum (13,898); Milwaukee, WI
December 20, 2019*; 8:00 pm, FS1		North Dakota State	W 82–68	9–2	32 – Howard	7 – McEwen	4 – Howard	Fiserv Forum (16,359); Milwaukee, WI
December 28, 2019*; 1:00 pm, FS1		Central Arkansas	W 106–54	10–2	30 – Howard	12 – Bailey	5 – Tied	Fiserv Forum (16,242); Milwaukee, WI
Big East regular season
January 1, 2020; 8:00 pm, CBSSN		at Creighton	L 75–92	10–3 (0–1)	18 – Tied	11 – Bailey	4 – Howard	CHI Health Center Omaha (17,289); Omaha, NE
January 4, 2020; 1:00 pm, FOX		No. 10 Villanova	W 71–60	11–3 (1–1)	29 – Howard	10 – John	4 – Elliott	Fiserv Forum (17,856); Milwaukee, WI
January 7, 2020; 6:00 pm, FS1		Providence	L 80–81 ^{OT}	11–4 (1–2)	39 – Howard	9 – Johnson	3 – Tied	Fiserv Forum (14,414); Milwaukee, WI
January 11, 2020; 3:00 pm, CBSSN		at Seton Hall	L 55–69	11–5 (1–3)	27 – Howard	11 – Bailey	3 – McEwen	Prudential Center (12,707); Newark, NJ
January 15, 2020; 7:00 pm, FSN		Xavier	W 85–65	12–5 (2–3)	35 – Howard	8 – Tied	4 – Howard	Fiserv Forum (13,761); Milwaukee, WI
January 18, 2020; 1:00 pm, FS1		at Georgetown	W 84–80	13–5 (3–3)	42 – Howard	7 – Tied	9 – McEwen	Capital One Arena (12,514); Washington, D.C.
January 21, 2020; 8:00 pm, FS1		St. John's	W 82–68	14–5 (4–3)	32 – Howard	9 – Tied	4 – Howard	Fiserv Forum (13,015); Milwaukee, WI
January 24, 2020; 8:00 pm, FS1		at No. 13 Butler	L 85–89 ^{OT}	14–6 (4–4)	26 – Howard	11 – McEwen	6 – Howard	Hinkle Fieldhouse (9,204); Indianapolis, IN
January 29, 2020; 7:30 pm, FS1		at Xavier	W 84–82 ^{2OT}	15–6 (5–4)	28 – Anim	9 – Cain	3 – Howard	Cintas Center (10,224); Cincinnati, OH
February 1, 2020; 1:00 pm, FSN		DePaul	W 76–72	16–6 (6–4)	31 – Howard	9 – McEwen	4 – Howard	Fiserv Forum (17,781); Milwaukee, WI
February 9, 2020; 11:00 am, FS1		No. 19 Butler	W 76–57	17–6 (7–4)	17 – Howard	8 – Bailey	6 – McEwen	Fiserv Forum (17,526); Milwaukee, WI
February 12, 2020; 7:30 pm, FS1	No. 18	at No. 15 Villanova	L 71–72	17–7 (7–5)	24 – Howard	11 – McEwen	5 – McEwen	Finneran Pavilion (6,501); Villanova, PA
February 18, 2020; 7:30 pm, FS1	No. 19	No. 15 Creighton	L 65–73	17–8 (7–6)	18 – Anim	10 – John	8 – McEwen	Fiserv Forum (14,329); Milwaukee, WI
February 22, 2020; 11:00 am, FOX	No. 19	at Providence	L 72–84	17–9 (7–7)	38 – Howard	6 – John	2 – Anim	Dunkin' Donuts Center (12,805); Providence, RI
February 26, 2020; 7:30 pm, FS1		Georgetown	W 93–72	18–9 (8–7)	30 – Howard	11 – Johnson	7 – Howard	Fiserv Forum (13,855); Milwaukee, WI
February 29, 2020; 1:30 pm, FOX		No. 13 Seton Hall	L 79–88	18–10 (8–8)	37 – Howard	12 – Johnson	4 – Howard	Fiserv Forum (17,538); Milwaukee, WI
March 3, 2020; 7:00 pm, FS1		at DePaul	L 68–69	18–11 (8–9)	31 – Howard	10 – Johnson	4 – McEwen	Wintrust Arena (6,901); Chicago, IL
March 7, 2020; 6:00 pm, FSN		at St. John's	L 86–88	18–12 (8–10)	30 – Howard	11 – Johnson	4 – Tied	Madison Square Garden (7,720); New York, NY
Big East tournament
March 12, 2020; 9:30 pm, FS1	(6)	vs. (3) No. 16 Seton Hall; Quarterfinals						Madison Square Garden; New York, NY
*Non-conference game. ^{#}Rankings from AP Poll. (#) Tournament seedings in parentheses. All times are in Central Time.

== Rankings ==
Ranking movements Legend: ██ Increase in ranking ██ Decrease in ranking — = Not ranked RV = Received votes
	Week																			
Poll	Pre	1	2	3	4	5	6	7	8	9	10	11	12	13	14	15	16	17	18	Final
AP	RV	RV	RV	—	—	RV	RV	RV	RV	RV	—	RV	—	RV	18	19	RV	RV	—	Not released
Coaches	RV	RV^	RV	—	—	RV	RV	RV	RV	RV	RV	RV	RV	RV	22	19	RV	RV	—	

*AP does not release post-NCAA Tournament rankings
^Coaches did not release a Week 2 poll.
