= 2019–20 St. John's Red Storm men's basketball team =

American college basketball season

2019–20 St. John's Red Storm men's basketball
- Conference: Big East Conference
- Record: 17–15 (5–13 Big East)
- Head coach: Mike Anderson (1st season)
- Associate head coach: T.J. Cleveland
- Assistant coaches: Van Macon; Steve DeMeo
- Home arena: Carnesecca Arena; Madison Square Garden

2019–20 Big East men's basketball standings
	Conf.				Overall
Team	W		L	PCT	W		L	PCT
No. 7 Creighton	13	–	5	.722	24	–	7	.774
No. 10 Villanova	13	–	5	.722	24	–	7	.774
No. 15 Seton Hall	13	–	5	.722	21	–	9	.700
Providence	12	–	6	.667	19	–	12	.613
No. 23 Butler	10	–	8	.556	22	–	9	.710
Marquette	8	–	10	.444	18	–	12	.600
Xavier	8	–	10	.444	19	–	13	.594
Georgetown	5	–	13	.278	15	–	17	.469
St. John's	5	–	13	.278	17	–	15	.531
DePaul	3	–	15	.167	16	–	16	.500
Note: The 2020 Big East tournament was cancelled at halftime of the first game of the quarterfinals due to the COVID-19 pandemic. Rankings from AP poll

The 2019–20 St. John's Red Storm men's basketball team represented St. John's University during the 2019–20 NCAA Division I men's basketball season. They were coached by Mike Anderson, in his first year at the school, and played their home games at Carnesecca Arena and Madison Square Garden as members of the Big East Conference. They finished the season 17–15, 5–13 in Big East play to finish in a tie for eighth place. As the No. 9 seed in the Big East tournament, they defeated Georgetown in the first round before having their quarterfinal game against Creighton canceled at halftime due to the ongoing coronavirus pandemic.

== Previous season ==
The Red Storm finished the 2018–19 season with a record of 21–13, 8–10 in Big East play to finish in seventh place in conference. They defeated DePaul in the first round of the Big East tournament before losing to Marquette in the quarterfinals. They received an at-large bid to the NCAA tournament where they lost in the first four to Arizona State.

== Offseason ==
=== Departures ===
Name	Number	Pos.	Height	Weight	Year	Hometown	Notes
Sedee Keita	0	F	6'9"	236	RS Sophomore	Philadelphia, Pennsylvania	Transferred to FIU
Shamorie Ponds	2	G	6'1"	180	Junior	Brooklyn, New York	Entered the 2019 NBA draft
Eli Wright	3	G	6'5"	190	RS Junior	Owensboro, Kentucky	Transferred to Western Kentucky
Justin Simon	5	G	6'5"	205	RS Junior	Temecula, California	Entered the 2019 NBA draft
Bryan Trimble Jr.	12	G	6'3"	220	Sophomore	Kansas City, Missouri	Transferred to Akron
Marvin Clark II	13	F	6'7"	225	RS Senior	Kansas City, Missouri	Graduated
Jay Camus	32	G	5'10"	170	Senior	Queens, New York	Graduated

=== Incoming transfers ===
Name	Pos.	Height	Weight	Year	Hometown	Previous school
Damien Sears	F	6'7"	230	RS Junior	Haughton, Louisiana	Western Oklahoma State
Nick Rutherford	G	6'3"	185	Graduate student	Indianapolis, Indiana	Monmouth
Rasheem Dunn	G	6'2"	190	RS Junior	Brooklyn, New York	Cleveland State

=== 2019 recruiting class ===
College recruiting
Name	Hometown	School	Height	Weight	Commit date
Johnathan McGriff; PG	District Heights, MD	Bishop McNamara	5 ft 9 in (1.75 m)	160 lb (73 kg)	May 2, 2019
Johnathan McGriff; PG	Recruit ratings: Scout: Rivals: 247Sports: ESPN: (70)				
Julian Champagnie; SF	Brooklyn, NY	Bishop Loughlin	6 ft 6 in (1.98 m)	210 lb (95 kg)	May 29, 2019
Julian Champagnie; SF	Recruit ratings: Scout: Rivals: 247Sports: ESPN: (NR)				
Overall recruit ranking:
Note: In many cases, Scout, Rivals, 247Sports, On3, and ESPN may conflict in their listings of height and weight.; In these cases, the average was taken. ESPN grades are on a 100-point scale.; Sources: "2019 Team Ranking". Rivals.

=== 2020 Recruiting class ===
College recruiting (2020)
Name	Hometown	School	Height	Weight	Commit date
Posh Alexander; PG	Brooklyn, NY	Our Saviour Lutheran School	5 ft 11 in (1.80 m)	190 lb (86 kg)	Aug 22, 2019
Posh Alexander; PG	Recruit ratings: Rivals: 247Sports: ESPN: (80)				
Dylan Addae-Wusu; SG	Yonkers, NY	Our Saviour Lutheran School	6 ft 4 in (1.93 m)	180 lb (82 kg)	Sep 28, 2019
Dylan Addae-Wusu; SG	Recruit ratings: Rivals: 247Sports: (NR)				
Overall recruit ranking:
Note: In many cases, Scout, Rivals, 247Sports, On3, and ESPN may conflict in their listings of height and weight.; In these cases, the average was taken. ESPN grades are on a 100-point scale.; Sources: "2020 Team Ranking". Rivals.

== Roster ==
2019–20 St. John's Red Storm men's basketball team
Players
Coaches

Pos.	#	Name	Height	Weight	Year	Previous school	Hometown
G	0	Mustapha Heron	6 ft 5 in (1.96 m)	205 lb (93 kg)	Sr	Auburn	Waterbury, CT
F	1	Josh Roberts	6 ft 9 in (2.06 m)	205 lb (93 kg)	So	Montverde Academy	Troy, AL
G/F	2	Julian Champagnie	6 ft 8 in (2.03 m)	215 lb (98 kg)	Fr	Bishop Loughlin	Brooklyn, NY
G	3	Rasheem Dunn	6 ft 2 in (1.88 m)	190 lb (86 kg)	RS Jr	Cleveland State	Brooklyn, NY
G	4	Greg Williams Jr.	6 ft 3 in (1.91 m)	200 lb (91 kg)	So	Lafayette Christian	Lafayette, LA
F	5	David Caraher	6 ft 6 in (1.98 m)	205 lb (93 kg)	RS So	Houston Baptist	Chapel Hill, NC
F	10	Marcellus Earlington	6 ft 6 in (1.98 m)	215 lb (98 kg)	So	Don Bosco Prep	Stony Point, NY
G	11	Johnathan McGriff (redshirt)	6 ft 0 in (1.83 m)	185 lb (84 kg)	Fr	Bishop McNamara	Bowie, MD
G	12	Thomas O'Connell (W)	6 ft 2 in (1.88 m)	195 lb (88 kg)	GS	Maryland	Mineola, NY
F	15	Damien Sears	6 ft 7 in (2.01 m)	230 lb (104 kg)	RS Jr	Western Oklahoma State	Haughton, LA
G	23	Justin Cole (W)	6 ft 2 in (1.88 m)	190 lb (86 kg)	Sr	Archbishop Molloy	Rockville Centre, NY
G	24	Nick Rutherford	6 ft 3 in (1.91 m)	185 lb (84 kg)	GS	Monmouth	Indianapolis, IN
G/F	30	L. J. Figueroa	6 ft 6 in (1.98 m)	200 lb (91 kg)	Jr	Odessa College	Lawrence, MA
F	33	Ian Steere (injured)	6 ft 9 in (2.06 m)	245 lb (111 kg)	So	NC State	Sanford, NC

Head coach

- Mike Anderson (Tulsa)

Assistant coach(es)

- T.J. Cleveland (Arkansas)
- Van Macon (Southampton)
- Steve DeMeo (Buffalo)

Legend

- (C) Team captain
- (S) Suspended
- (I) Ineligible
- (W) Walk-on
- Injured
- Current redshirt

Roster

== Schedule and results ==
Date time, TV	Rank^{#}	Opponent^{#}	Result	Record	High points	High rebounds	High assists	Site (attendance) city, state
Exhibition
October 30, 2019*; 7:00 pm, ESPN3		Queens College	W 94–59		28 – Figueroa	8 – Figueroa	5 – Tied	Carnesecca Arena (3,250); Queens, NY
Regular season
November 6, 2019*; 6:30 pm, FS1		Mercer	W 109–79	1–0	25 – Heron	8 – Champagnie	8 – Rutherford	Carnesecca Arena (3,354); Queens, NY
November 9, 2019*; 4:00 pm, FS2		Central Connecticut	W 87–57	2–0	30 – Heron	11 – Sears	6 – Figueroa	Carnesecca Arena (3,582); Queens, NY
November 12, 2019*; 7:00 pm, FS2		New Hampshire	W 74–61	3–0	25 – Figueroa	9 – Champagnie	5 – Tied	Carnesecca Arena (3,320); Queens, NY
November 16, 2019*; 4:00 pm, FS2		Vermont; Hall of Fame Tip Off campus-site game	L 68–70	3–1	14 – Tied	13 – Roberts	2 – Tied	Carnesecca Arena (4,054); Queens, NY
November 20, 2019*; 7:00 pm, FS1		Columbia; Hall of Fame Tip Off campus-site game	W 82–63	4–1	15 – Heron	11 – Roberts	3 – Dunn	Carnesecca Arena (3,419); Queens, NY
November 23, 2019*; 2:30 pm, ESPN3		vs. Arizona State; Hall of Fame Tip Off semifinals	L 67–80	4–2	17 – Figueroa	8 – Roberts	2 – Tied	Mohegan Sun Arena (7,862); Uncasville, CT
November 24, 2019*; 3:30 pm, ESPN2		vs. UMass; Hall of Fame Tip Off consolation	W 78–63	5–2	17 – Caraher	8 – Roberts	3 – Williams Jr.	Mohegan Sun Arena (5,822); Uncasville, CT
November 30, 2019*; 12:00 pm, FS2		Wagner	W 86–63	6–2	18 – Heron	9 – Roberts	6 – Figueroa	Carnesecca Arena (3,253); Queens, NY
December 3, 2019*; 6:30 pm, FS1		Saint Peter's	W 79–69	7–2	19 – Figueroa	11 – Champagnie	5 – Tied	Carnesecca Arena (2,845); Queens, NY
December 7, 2019*; 12:00 pm, FS1		West Virginia; Madison Square Garden Holiday Festival; Big East–Big 12 Battle	W 70–68	8–2	17 – Figueroa	9 – Roberts	4 – Dunn	Madison Square Garden (7,281); New York, NY
December 10, 2019*; 7:00 pm, FS1		Brown	W 82–71	9–2	23 – Figueroa	9 – Roberts	6 – Dunn	Carnesecca Arena (3,147); Queens, NY
December 18, 2019*; 8:30 pm, FS1		Albany	W 85–57	10–2	16 – Earlington	9 – Earlington	7 – Rutherford	Carnesecca Arena (2,963); Queens, NY
December 21, 2019*; 10:00 pm, ESPN2		vs. No. 16 Arizona; Al Attles Classic	W 70–67	11–2	21 – Figueroa	7 – Williams Jr.	3 – Tied	Chase Center (6,728); San Francisco, CA
Big East regular season
December 31, 2019; 7:30 pm, FS1		No. 11 Butler	L 58–60	11–3 (0–1)	15 – Rutherford	4 – Sears	5 – Rutherford	Carnesecca Arena (3,816); Queens, NY
January 5, 2020; 4:30 pm, FOX		at Xavier	L 67–75	11–4 (0–2)	17 – Figueroa	6 – Tied	4 – Dunn	Cintas Center (10,254); Cincinnati, OH
January 8, 2020; 6:30pm, FS1		at Georgetown; Rivalry	L 66–87	11–5 (0–3)	23 – Figueroa	9 – Dunn	4 – Dunn	Capital One Arena (7,436); Washington, DC
January 11, 2020; 12:00 pm, FSN		DePaul	W 74–67	12–5 (1–3)	19 – Dunn	8 – Dunn	5 – Dunn	Madison Square Garden (6,636); New York, NY
January 15, 2020; 8:30 pm, FS1		at Providence	L 58–63	12–6 (1–4)	12 – Figueroa	9 – Figueroa	2 – Tied	Dunkin' Donuts Center (9,542); Providence, RI
January 18, 2020; 12:00 pm, FOX		No. 18 Seton Hall; The Garf	L 79–82	12–7 (1–5)	18 – Heron	8 – Roberts	6 – Rutherford	Madison Square Garden (10,428); New York, NY
January 21, 2020; 9:00 pm, FS1		at Marquette	L 68–82	12–8 (1–6)	18 – Heron	9 – Champagnie	4 – Dunn	Fiserv Forum (13,015); Milwaukee, WI
January 25, 2020; 2:00 pm, FS1		at DePaul	W 79–66	13–8 (2–6)	28 – Figueroa	11 – Champagnie	4 – Rutherford	Wintrust Arena (5,950); Chicago, IL
January 28, 2020; 6:30 pm, FS1		No. 8 Villanova	L 59–79	13–9 (2–7)	24 – Dunn	5 – Tied	4 – Dunn	Madison Square Garden (10,155); New York, NY
February 2, 2020; 1:00 pm, CBS		Georgetown; Rivalry	L 72–73	13–10 (2–8)	16 – Dunn	10 – Champagnie	6 – Rutherford	Madison Square Garden (8,100); New York, NY
February 8, 2020; 6:00 pm, CBSSN		at No. 21 Creighton	L 82–94	13–11 (2–9)	25 – Earlington	10 – Earlington	6 – Dunn	CHI Health Center Omaha (18,122); Omaha, NE
February 12, 2020; 8:30 pm, CBSSN		Providence	W 80–69	14–11 (3–9)	19 – Figueroa	7 – Tied	4 – Dunn	Carnesecca Arena (4,083); Queens, NY
February 17, 2020; 6:30 pm, FS1		Xavier	L 74–77	14–12 (3–10)	17 – Tied	8 – Earlington	7 – Rutherford	Madison Square Garden (14,765); New York, NY
February 23, 2020; 2:00 pm, CBS		at No. 16 Seton Hall	L 65–81	14–13 (3–11)	19 – Figueroa	11 – Champagnie	3 – Dunn	Prudential Center (14,648); Newark, NJ
February 26, 2020; 6:30 pm, FS1		at No. 12 Villanova	L 60–71	14–14 (3–12)	12 – Tied	6 – Champagnie	5 – Dunn	Finneran Pavilion (6,501); Villanova, PA
March 1, 2020; 12:00 pm, FS1		No. 10 Creighton	W 91–71	15–14 (4–12)	21 – Williams Jr.	12 – Figueroa	10 – Dunn	Carnesecca Arena (4,260); Queens, NY
March 4, 2020; 7:00 pm, CBSSN		at Butler	L 55–77	15–15 (4–13)	23 – Champagnie	7 – Earlington	3 – Rutherford	Hinkle Fieldhouse (8,675); Indianapolis, IN
March 7, 2020; 12:00 pm, FSN		Marquette	W 88–86	16–15 (5–13)	21 – Champagnie	12 – Champagnie	5 – Rutherford	Madison Square Garden (7,720); New York, NY
Big East tournament
March 11, 2020; 7:00 pm, FS1	(9)	vs. (8) Georgetown; First round	W 75–62	17–15	22 – Figueroa	10 – Earlington	5 – Dunn	Madison Square Garden (17,534); New York, NY
March 12, 2020; 12:00 pm, FS1	(9)	vs. (1) No. 7 Creighton; Quarterfinals	38–35 (canceled @ HT)					Madison Square Garden; New York, NY
*Non-conference game. ^{#}Rankings from AP Poll. (#) Tournament seedings in parentheses.
