= 2019–20 Seton Hall Pirates men's basketball team =

American college basketball season

2019–20 Seton Hall Pirates men's basketball

Big East regular season co-champions
- Conference: Big East Conference

Ranking
- Coaches: No. 15
- AP: No. 15
- Record: 21–9 (13–5 Big East)
- Head coach: Kevin Willard (10th season)
- Assistant coaches: Grant Billmeier; Tony Skinn; Duane Woodward
- Home arena: Prudential Center; Walsh Gymnasium

2019–20 Big East men's basketball standings
	Conf.				Overall
Team	W		L	PCT	W		L	PCT
No. 7 Creighton	13	–	5	.722	24	–	7	.774
No. 10 Villanova	13	–	5	.722	24	–	7	.774
No. 15 Seton Hall	13	–	5	.722	21	–	9	.700
Providence	12	–	6	.667	19	–	12	.613
No. 23 Butler	10	–	8	.556	22	–	9	.710
Marquette	8	–	10	.444	18	–	12	.600
Xavier	8	–	10	.444	19	–	13	.594
Georgetown	5	–	13	.278	15	–	17	.469
St. John's	5	–	13	.278	17	–	15	.531
DePaul	3	–	15	.167	16	–	16	.500
Note: The 2020 Big East tournament was cancelled at halftime of the first game of the quarterfinals due to the COVID-19 pandemic. Rankings from AP poll

The 2019–20 Seton Hall Pirates men's basketball team represented Seton Hall University in the 2019–20 NCAA Division I men's basketball season. They are led by tenth-year head coach Kevin Willard. The Pirates played their home games at the Prudential Center in Newark, New Jersey and Walsh Gymnasium in South Orange, New Jersey as members of the Big East Conference. They finished the season 21–9, 13–5 in Big East play, which put them in a three-way tie for first place. As the No. 3 seed in the Big East tournament, they were slated to play Marquette in the quarterfinals, but the Tournament was cancelled due to the COVID-19 pandemic, along with the rest of the NCAA postseason.

== Previous season ==
The Pirates finished the 2018–19 season 20–14, 9–9 in Big East play to finish in a four-way tie for third place. In the Big East tournament, they defeated Georgetown in the quarterfinals and Marquette in the semifinals before losing to Villanova by two points in the final. They received an at-large bid to the NCAA tournament as the No. 10 seed in the Midwest region and were defeated by No. 7 seed Wofford in the first round.

== Offseason ==
=== Departures ===
Name	Number	Pos.	Height	Weight	Year	Hometown	Reason for departure
Michael Nzei	1	F	6'8"	205	RS Senior	Makurdi, Nigeria	Graduated

=== Incoming transfers ===
Name	Number	Pos.	Height	Weight	Year	Hometown	Previous School
Takal Molson	1	G	6'5"	205	Junior	Buffalo, New York	Transferred from Canisius. Under NCAA transfer rules, Molson will have to sit out for the 2019–20 season. Will have two years of remaining eligibility.

=== Class of 2019 recruits ===
College recruiting
Name	Hometown	School	Height	Weight	Commit date
Tyrese Samuel; PF	Mono, Ontario, Canada	Orangeville Prep	6 ft 8 in (2.03 m)	210 lb (95 kg)	Nov 27, 2018
Tyrese Samuel; PF	Recruit ratings: Scout: Rivals: 247Sports: (81)				
Overall recruit ranking:
Note: In many cases, Scout, Rivals, 247Sports, On3, and ESPN may conflict in their listings of height and weight.; In these cases, the average was taken. ESPN grades are on a 100-point scale.; Sources: "2019 Team Ranking". Rivals.

== Roster ==
2019–20 Seton Hall Pirates men's basketball team
Players
Coaches

Pos.	#	Name	Height	Weight	Year	Previous school	Hometown
G	0	Quincy McKnight	6 ft 4 in (1.93 m)	185 lb (84 kg)	RS Sr	Sacred Heart	Bridgeport, Connecticut
F	1	Takal Molson (redshirt)	6 ft 5 in (1.96 m)	205 lb (93 kg)	Sr	Canisius	Buffalo, New York
G	2	Anthony Nelson	6 ft 4 in (1.93 m)	180 lb (82 kg)	So	South Kent School	New York, New York
F	4	Tyrese Samuel	6 ft 10 in (2.08 m)	220 lb (100 kg)	Fr	Orangeville Prep	Montreal, Quebec
G	13	Myles Powell	6 ft 2 in (1.88 m)	195 lb (88 kg)	Sr	Trenton Catholic Academy	Trenton, New Jersey
G/F	14	Jared Rhoden	6 ft 6 in (1.98 m)	210 lb (95 kg)	So	Our Saviour Lutheran School	Baldwin, New York
F	15	Taurean Thompson	6 ft 11 in (2.11 m)	235 lb (107 kg)	RS Jr	Syracuse	Jersey City, New Jersey
C	21	Ike Obiagu	7 ft 2 in (2.18 m)	265 lb (120 kg)	RS So	Florida State	Abuja, Nigeria
G/F	22	Myles Cale	6 ft 6 in (1.98 m)	210 lb (95 kg)	Jr	Appoquinimink High School	Middletown, Delaware
F	23	Sandro Mamukelashvili	6 ft 11 in (2.11 m)	240 lb (109 kg)	Jr	Montverde Academy	Tbilisi, Georgia
G	30	Asiah Avent	6 ft 3 in (1.91 m)	190 lb (86 kg)	Sr	Hartford	Springfield, New Jersey
F	32	Darnell Brodie	6 ft 9 in (2.06 m)	265 lb (120 kg)	So	East Side	Newark, New Jersey
G	33	Shavar Reynolds Jr.	6 ft 2 in (1.88 m)	190 lb (86 kg)	Jr	Manchester Township High School	Manchester, New Jersey
C	35	Romaro Gill	7 ft 2 in (2.18 m)	255 lb (116 kg)	RS Sr	Vincennes	St. Thomas, Jamaica

Head coach

- Kevin Willard (Pittsburgh)

Assistant coach(es)

- Grant Billmeier (Seton Hall)
- Tony Skinn (George Mason)
- Duane Woodward (Boston College)

Legend

- (C) Team captain
- (S) Suspended
- (I) Ineligible
- (W) Walk-on
- Injured
- Current redshirt

Roster
Last update: October 30, 2019

== Schedule and results ==
Date time, TV	Rank^{#}	Opponent^{#}	Result	Record	High points	High rebounds	High assists	Site (attendance) city, state
Exhibition
October 25, 2019*; 7:00 pm	No. 12	Bloomfield; Charity exhibition	W 81–52	–	21 – Powell	10 – Samuel	8 – McKnight	Walsh Gymnasium (1,655); South Orange, NJ
October 29, 2019*; 7:00 pm	No. 12	Misericordia; Charity exhibition	W 112–38	–	22 – Powell	7 – Obiagu	5 – Reynolds	Walsh Gymnasium (1,655); South Orange, NJ
Non-conference regular season
November 5, 2019*; 6:30 pm, FS1	No. 12	Wagner	W 105–71	1–0	27 – Powell	6 – Samuel	7 – McKnight	Walsh Gymnasium (1,655); South Orange, NJ
November 9, 2019*; 2:30 pm, FSN	No. 12	Stony Brook	W 74–57	2–0	17 – Mamukelashvili	10 – Gill	4 – Reynolds	Walsh Gymnasium (1,655); South Orange, NJ
November 14, 2019*; 8:30 pm, FS1	No. 12	No. 3 Michigan State; Gavitt Tipoff Games	L 73–76	2–1	37 – Powell	8 – Gill	6 – McKnight	Prudential Center (14,051); Newark, NJ
November 17, 2019*; 4:00 pm, ESPNU	No. 12	at Saint Louis	W 83–66	3–1	26 – Powell	8 – Rhoden	4 – Nelson	Chaifetz Arena (9,611); St. Louis, MO
November 23, 2019*; 12:00 pm, FS2	No. 13	Florida A&M	W 87–51	4–1	23 – Powell	9 – Gill	5 – McKnight	Prudential Center (9,656); Newark, NJ
November 27, 2019*; 9:30 pm, ESPN2	No. 13	vs. No. 11 Oregon; Battle 4 Atlantis quarterfinals	L 69–71	4–2	32 – Powell	4 – Tied	4 – Tied	Imperial Arena (1,565); Nassau, Bahamas
November 28, 2019*; 9:00 pm, ESPN2	No. 13	vs. Southern Miss; Battle 4 Atlantis consolation 2nd round	W 81–56	5–2	18 – Powell	7 – Mamukelashvili	4 – Mamukelashvili	Imperial Arena (1,204); Nassau, Bahamas
November 30, 2019*; 7:00 pm, ESPNU	No. 13	vs. Iowa State; Battle 4 Atlantis 5th place game	W 84–76	6–2	24 – Powell	12 – Cale	5 – McKnight	Imperial Arena (2,650); Nassau, Bahamas
December 8, 2019*; 9:00 pm, ESPN2	No. 16	at Iowa State; Big East/Big 12 Battle	L 66–76	6–3	19 – Powell	8 – Powell	4 – Nelson	Hilton Coliseum (14,269); Ames, IA
December 14, 2019*; 4:00 pm, BTN	No. 22	at Rutgers; Rivalry/Garden State Hardwood Classic	L 48–68	6–4	11 – McKnight	8 – Rhoden	2 – 3 Tied	Louis Brown Athletic Center (8,329); Piscataway, NJ
December 19, 2019*; 7:00 pm, FS1		No. 7 Maryland	W 52–48	7–4	17 – McKnight	12 – Rhoden	6 – McKnight	Prudential Center (13,313); Newark, NJ
December 22, 2019*; 4:30 pm, FS1		Prairie View A&M	W 75–55	8–4	25 – McKnight	9 – Rhoden	7 – Nelson	Prudential Center (8,879); Newark, NJ
Big East regular season
December 30, 2019; 8:30 pm, FS1		at DePaul	W 74–66	9–4 (1–0)	27 – Powell	6 – Cale	7 – McKnight	Wintrust Arena (6,364); Chicago, IL
January 3, 2020; 9:00 pm, FS1		Georgetown	W 78–62	10–4 (2–0)	17 – Gill	9 – Rhoden	10 – McKnight	Prudential Center (10,481); Newark, NJ
January 8, 2020; 8:30 pm, FS1		at Xavier	W 83–71	11–4 (3–0)	24 – Powell	8 – Powell	8 – McKnight	Cintas Center (9,832); Cincinnati, OH
January 11, 2020; 4:00 pm, CBSSN		Marquette	W 69–55	12–4 (4–0)	23 – Powell	7 – Powell	6 – McKnight	Prudential Center (12,707); Newark, NJ
January 15, 2020; 6:30 pm, FS1	No. 18	at No. 5 Butler	W 78–70	13–4 (5–0)	29 – Powell	8 – Rhoden	13 – McKnight	Hinkle Fieldhouse (8,823); Indianapolis, IN
January 18, 2020; 12:00 pm, FOX	No. 18	at St. John's	W 82–79	14–4 (6–0)	29 – Powell	13 – Gill	5 – McKnight	Madison Square Garden (10,428); New York, NY
January 22, 2020; 8:30 pm, FS1	No. 10	Providence	W 73–64	15–4 (7–0)	17 – Gill	8 – Rhoden	8 – McKnight	Prudential Center (9,267); Newark, NJ
January 29, 2020; 6:30 pm, FS1	No. 10	DePaul	W 64–57	16–4 (8–0)	24 – Powell	11 – Rhoden	6 – McKnight	Prudential Center (9,302); Newark, NJ
February 1, 2020; 11:00 am, FOX	No. 10	Xavier	L 62–74	16–5 (8–1)	15 – McKnight	5 – Tied	4 – Powell	Prudential Center (12,230); Newark, NJ
February 5, 2020; 8:30 pm, FS1	No. 12	at Georgetown	W 78–71	17–5 (9–1)	34 – Powell	12 – Mamukelashvili	10 – McKnight	Capital One Arena (4,344); Washington, DC
February 8, 2020; 2:30 pm, FOX	No. 12	at No. 10 Villanova	W 70–64	18–5 (10–1)	19 – Powell	11 – Rhoden	4 – Reynolds	Wells Fargo Center (20,706); Philadelphia, PA
February 12, 2020; 6:30 pm, FS1	No. 10	No. 23 Creighton	L 82–87	18–6 (10–2)	20 – McKnight	12 – Rhoden	6 – McKnight	Prudential Center (9,736); Newark, NJ
February 15, 2020; 8:00 pm, CBSSN	No. 10	at Providence	L 71–74	18–7 (10–3)	27 – Powell	8 – Tied	4 – Tied	Dunkin' Donuts Center (13,255); Providence, RI
February 19, 2020; 6:30 pm, FS1	No. 16	No. 21 Butler	W 74–72	19–7 (11–3)	18 – McKnight	7 – Gill	5 – Powell	Prudential Center (10,481); Newark, NJ
February 23, 2020; 2:00 pm, CBS	No. 16	St. John's	W 81–65	20–7 (12–3)	18 – Powell	9 – Mamukelashvili	6 – McKnight	Prudential Center (14,648); Newark, NJ
February 29, 2020; 2:30 pm, FOX	No. 13	at Marquette	W 88–79	21–7 (13–3)	28 – Powell	9 – Mamukelashvili	8 – McKnight	Fiserv Forum (17,538); Milwaukee, WI
March 4, 2020; 8:30 pm, FS1	No. 8	No. 14 Villanova	L 77–79	21–8 (13–4)	20 – Mamukelashvili	10 – Mamukelashvili	8 – Powell	Prudential Center (16,863); Newark, NJ
March 7, 2020; 2:30 pm, FOX	No. 8	at No. 11 Creighton	L 60–77	21–9 (13–5)	15 – Tied	12 – Mamukelashvili	5 – Powell	CHI Health Center Omaha (18,519); Omaha, NE
Big East tournament
March 12, 2020; 9:30 pm, FS1	(3) No. 16	vs. (6) Marquette; Quarterfinal	This game was not played due to the COVID-19 pandemic					Madison Square Garden; New York, NY
*Non-conference game. ^{#}Rankings from AP Poll. (#) Tournament seedings in parentheses. All times are in Eastern Time.

== Rankings ==
- On January 20, the Pirates achieved their 1st Top 10 ranking in 20 years, when they were ranked #8 on December 18, 2000.
- On March 2, the Pirates were ranked at #8 in the AP Poll, their highest ranking since reaching #7 in 2001.

Ranking movements Legend: ██ Increase in ranking ██ Decrease in ranking RV = Received votes
	Week																				
Poll	Pre	1	2	3	4	5	6	7	8	9	10	11	12	13	14	15	16	17	18	19	Final
AP	12	12	12	13	13	16	22	RV	RV	RV	RV	18	10	10	12	10	16	13	8	16	15
Coaches	13	13*	13*	13	13	15	22	RV	RV	RV	25	18	10	9	13	10	14	13	7	15	15
