= 2019–20 Creighton Bluejays men's basketball team =

American college basketball season

2019–20 Creighton Bluejays men's basketball

Big East regular season co-champions
- Conference: Big East Conference

Ranking
- Coaches: No. 9
- AP: No. 7
- Record: 24–7 (13–5 Big East)
- Head coach: Greg McDermott (10th season)
- Assistant coaches: Steve Merfeld (8th season); Alan Huss (3rd season); Paul Lusk (2nd season)
- Home arena: CHI Health Center Omaha

2019–20 Big East men's basketball standings
| | Conf. | | | | Overall |
| Team | W | | L | PCT | W | | L | PCT |
|---|---|---|---|---|---|---|---|---|
| No. 7 Creighton | 13 | – | 5 | .722 | 24 | – | 7 | .774 |
| No. 10 Villanova | 13 | – | 5 | .722 | 24 | – | 7 | .774 |
| No. 15 Seton Hall | 13 | – | 5 | .722 | 21 | – | 9 | .700 |
| Providence | 12 | – | 6 | .667 | 19 | – | 12 | .613 |
| No. 23 Butler | 10 | – | 8 | .556 | 22 | – | 9 | .710 |
| Marquette | 8 | – | 10 | .444 | 18 | – | 12 | .600 |
| Xavier | 8 | – | 10 | .444 | 19 | – | 13 | .594 |
| Georgetown | 5 | – | 13 | .278 | 15 | – | 17 | .469 |
| St. John's | 5 | – | 13 | .278 | 17 | – | 15 | .531 |
| DePaul | 3 | – | 15 | .167 | 16 | – | 16 | .500 |
Note: The 2020 Big East tournament was cancelled at halftime of the first game of the quarterfinals due to the COVID-19 pandemic. Rankings from AP poll

The 2019–20 Creighton Bluejays men's basketball team represented Creighton University in the 2019–20 NCAA Division I men's basketball season. The Bluejays were led by 10th-year head coach Greg McDermott and played their home games at the CHI Health Center Omaha in Omaha, Nebraska, as members of the Big East Conference. They finished the season 24–7, 13–5 in Big East play to earn share of the Big East regular season championship, and the No. 1 seed in the conference tournament. The Big East tournament and all other postseason tournaments including the NCAA tournament were canceled shortly after the regular season ended due to the ongoing COVID-19 pandemic. The cancellations effectively ended the Bluejays' season.

== Previous season ==
The Bluejays finished the 2018–19 season 20–15, 9–9 in Big East play to finish in a four-way tie for third place. As the No. 5 seed in the Big East tournament, they lost to Xavier in the quarterfinals. They received a bid to the National Invitation Tournament as the No. 2 seed in the TCU bracket where they defeated Loyola and Memphis before losing to TCU in the quarterfinals.

== Offseason ==
=== 2019 recruiting class ===
College recruiting information (2019)
| Name | Hometown | School | Height | Weight | Commit date |
|---|---|---|---|---|---|
| Shereef Mitchell; PG | Omaha, NE | Burke High School | 6 ft 0 in (1.83 m) | 155 lb (70 kg) | Jul 12, 2018 |
| Shereef Mitchell; PG | Recruit ratings: Scout: Rivals: 247Sports: ESPN: | | | | |
Overall recruit ranking:
Note: In many cases, Scout, Rivals, 247Sports, On3, and ESPN may conflict in their listings of height and weight.; In these cases, the average was taken. ESPN grades are on a 100-point scale.; Sources: "2019 Team Ranking". Rivals.

== Roster ==
2019–20 Creighton Bluejays men's basketball team
Players
Coaches

| Pos. | # | Name | Height | Weight | Year | Previous school | Hometown |
|---|---|---|---|---|---|---|---|
| G | 0 | Antwann Jones (redshirt) | 6 ft 6 in (1.98 m) | 205 lb (93 kg) | So | Oak Ridge; Memphis | Orlando, FL |
| G | 1 | Davion Mintz (redshirt) | 6 ft 3 in (1.91 m) | 185 lb (84 kg) | Sr | North Mecklenburg HS | Charlotte, NC |
| G | 4 | Shereef Mitchell | 6 ft 0 in (1.83 m) | 155 lb (70 kg) | Fr | Sunrise Christian Academy | Omaha, NE |
| G | 5 | Ty-Shon Alexander | 6 ft 4 in (1.93 m) | 195 lb (88 kg) | Jr | Oak Hill Academy (VA) | Charlotte, NC |
| G | 10 | Jett Canfield (W) | 5 ft 10 in (1.78 m) | 155 lb (70 kg) | RS Fr | Hayden HS | Topeka, KS |
| G | 11 | Marcus Zegarowski | 6 ft 2 in (1.88 m) | 180 lb (82 kg) | So | Tilton School | Hamilton, MA |
| G | 12 | Jordan Scurry (W) | 6 ft 2 in (1.88 m) | 200 lb (91 kg) | Sr | St. Mark's | Chestnut Hill, MA |
| F | 13 | Christian Bishop | 6 ft 7 in (2.01 m) | 205 lb (93 kg) | So | West | Lee's Summit, MO |
| F | 20 | Nic Zeil | 6 ft 8 in (2.03 m) | 210 lb (95 kg) | Fr | Park Hill HS | Kansas City, MO |
| G | 21 | Jalen Windham | 6 ft 5 in (1.96 m) | 180 lb (82 kg) | Fr | Ben Davis HS | Indianapolis, IN |
| F | 23 | Damien Jefferson | 6 ft 5 in (1.96 m) | 200 lb (91 kg) | RS Jr | Central HS; New Mexico | East Chicago, IN |
| G | 24 | Mitch Ballock | 6 ft 5 in (1.96 m) | 205 lb (93 kg) | Jr | Eudora HS | Eudora, KS |
| G/F | 34 | Denzel Mahoney | 6 ft 5 in (1.96 m) | 225 lb (102 kg) | Jr | Hagerty; Southeast Missouri State | Oviedo, FL |
| C | 41 | Jacob Epperson | 6 ft 11 in (2.11 m) | 225 lb (102 kg) | So | La Lumiere (IN) | Melbourne, Australia |
| C | 43 | Kelvin Jones (redshirt) | 6 ft 11 in (2.11 m) | 230 lb (104 kg) | Sr | Hobbs HS; Idaho State | Chihuahua, Mexico |

Head coach

- Greg McDermott (Northern Iowa)

Assistant coach(es)

- Preston Murphy (Rhode Island)
- Alan Huss (Creighton)
- Paul Lusk (Southern Illinois)

Legend

- (C) Team captain
- (S) Suspended
- (I) Ineligible
- (W) Walk-on
- Injured
- Current redshirt

Roster

== Schedule and results ==
| Date time, TV | Rank^{#} | Opponent^{#} | Result | Record | High points | High rebounds | High assists | Site (attendance) city, state |
Australia exhibition trip
| August 5, 2019*; 3:00 am | | at Basketball Australia Center of Excellence | L 66–79 | | 20 – Ballock | 8 – Jefferson | 4 – Mitchell | Shore School; North Sydney, New South Wales |
| August 8, 2019*; 5:30 am | | at Cairns Taipans | W 89–85 | | 18 – Mintz | 6 – Jefferson | 5 – Mintz | Cairns Convention Centre; Cairns City, Queensland |
| August 12, 2019*; 4:00 am | | at Bullets Invitational | W 107–79 | | 25 – Bishop | 8 – Jones | 7 – Mintz | Auchenflower Stadium; Auchenflower, Queensland |
Exhibition
| November 1, 2019*; 7:30 pm | | McKendree | W 95–63 | | 21 – Bishop | 12 – Jones | 6 – Zegarowski | CHI Health Center Omaha (15,340); Omaha, NE |
Non-conference regular season
| November 5, 2019*; 8:00 pm, FSN | | Kennesaw State | W 81–55 | 1–0 | 19 – Alexander | 7 – Tied | 5 – Zegarowski | CHI Health Center Omaha (16,321); Omaha, NE |
| November 12, 2019*; 5:30 pm, FS1 | | at Michigan; Gavitt Tipoff Games | L 69–79 | 1–1 | 20 – Alexander | 9 – Jones | 3 – Tied | Crisler Center (11,398); Ann Arbor, MI |
| November 16, 2019*; 5:00 pm, FS2 | | Louisiana Tech | W 82–72 | 2–1 | 22 – Ballock | 7 – Jefferson | 5 – Zegarowski | CHI Health Center Omaha (16,919); Omaha, NE |
| November 22, 2019*; 8:00 pm, FS1 | | Cal Poly; Las Vegas Invitational campus game | W 86–70 | 3–1 | 18 – Zegarowski | 8 – Jefferson | 6 – Zegarowski | CHI Health Center Omaha (16,783); Omaha, NE |
| November 24, 2019*; 1:00 pm, FS1 | | North Florida; Las Vegas Invitational campus game | W 76–67 | 4–1 | 19 – Zegarowski | 11 – Ballock | 4 – Tied | CHI Health Center Omaha (16,562); Omaha, NE |
| November 28, 2019; 9:30 pm, FS1 | | vs. San Diego State; Las Vegas Invitational semifinal | L 52–83 | 4–2 | 12 – Ballock | 5 – Bishop | 2 – Tied | Orleans Arena; Paradise, NV |
| November 29, 2019; 9:30 pm, FS1 | | vs. No. 12 Texas Tech; Las Vegas Invitational 3rd place game | W 83–76 ^{OT} | 5–2 | 32 – Zegarowski | 12 – Alexander | 5 – Zegarowski | Orleans Arena (N/A); Paradise, NV |
| December 3, 2019*; 7:30 pm, FS1 | | Oral Roberts | W 72–60 | 6–2 | 17 – Bishop | 8 – Tied | 6 – Zegarowski | CHI Health Center Omaha (16,427); Omaha, NE |
| December 7, 2019*; 1:30 pm, FS1 | | Nebraska; Rivalry | W 95–76 | 7–2 | 30 – Zegarowski | 9 – Tied | 6 – Zegarowski | CHI Health Center Omaha (18,068); Omaha, NE |
| December 13, 2019*; 7;00 pm, FS1 | | UTRGV | W 89–58 | 8–2 | 22 – Alexander | 8 – Alexander | 4 – Ballock | CHI Health Center Omaha (16,346); Omaha, NE |
| December 17, 2019*; 7:30 pm, FS1 | | Oklahoma; Big East/Big 12 Battle | W 83–73 | 9–2 | 20 – Zegarowski | 11 – Alexander | 7 – Zegarowski | CHI Health Center Omaha (17,146); Omaha, NE |
| December 21, 2019*; 7:30 pm, P12N | | at Arizona State | W 67–60 | 10–2 | 14 – Tied | 9 – Bishop | 8 – Zegarowski | Desert Financial Arena (9,395); Tempe, AZ |
| December 28, 2019*; 5:00 pm, FS1 | | Midland | W 91–54 | 11–2 | 19 – Tied | 11 – Jefferson | 6 – Zegarowski | CHI Health Center Omaha (16,914); Omaha, NE |
Big East regular season
| January 1, 2020; 8:00 pm, CBSSN | | Marquette | W 92–75 | 12–2 (1–0) | 21 – Alexander | 8 – Tied | 6 – Zegarowski | CHI Health Center (17,289); Omaha, NE |
| January 4, 2020; 11:00 am, FS1 | | at No. 11 Butler | L 57–71 | 12–3 (1–1) | 15 – Zegarowki | 7 – Alexander | 4 – Alexander | Hinkle Fieldhouse (9,129); Indianapolis, IN |
| January 7, 2020; 8:00 pm, FS1 | | No. 16 Villanova | L 59–64 | 12–4 (1–2) | 16 – Bishop | 9 – Bishop | 6 – Zegarowski | CHI Health Center Omaha (17,682); Omaha, NE |
| January 11, 2020; 1:00 pm, FOX | | at Xavier | W 77–65 | 13–4 (2–2) | 19 – Ballock | 8 – Tied | 5 – Tied | Cintas Center (10,529); Cincinnati, OH |
| January 15, 2020; 6:00 pm, CBSSN | No. 25 | at Georgetown | L 80–83 | 13–5 (2–3) | 20 – Zegarowski | 5 – Alexander | 7 – Zegarowski | Capital One Arena (5,920); Washington, DC |
| January 18, 2020; 3:30 pm, FS1 | No. 25 | Providence | W 78–74 | 14–5 (3–3) | 24 – Alexander | 10 – Jefferson | 3 – Zegarowski | CHI Health Center Omaha (17,048); Omaha, NE |
| January 22, 2020; 8:00 pm, CBSSN | | DePaul | W 83–68 | 15–5 (4–3) | 19 – Ballock | 6 – Ballock | 10 – Zegarowski | Wintrust Arena (4,535); Chicago, IL |
| January 26, 2020; 3:00 pm, FS1 | | Xavier | W 77–66 | 16–5 (5–3) | 24 – Alexander | 5 – Tied | 6 – Zegarowski | CHI Health Center Omaha (17,796); Omaha, NE |
| February 1, 2020; 11:00 am, FS1 | | at No. 8 Villanova | W 76–61 | 17–5 (6–3) | 21 – Mahoney | 10 – Alexander | 5 – Ballock | Wells Fargo Center (15,501); Philadelphia, PA |
| February 5, 2020; 6:00 pm, FSN | No. 21 | at Providence | L 56–73 | 17–6 (6–4) | 15 – Alexander | 5 – Tied | 7 – Zegarowski | Dunkin Donuts Center (10,102); Providence, RI |
| February 8, 2020; 5:00 pm, CBSSN | No. 21 | St. John's | W 94–82 | 18–6 (7–4) | 23 – Zegarowski | 7 – Tied | 8 – Ballock | CHI Health Center Omaha (18,122); Omaha, NE |
| February 12, 2020; 5:30 pm, FS1 | No. 23 | at No. 10 Seton Hall | W 87–82 | 19–6 (8–4) | 18 – Tied | 9 – Jefferson | 8 – Zegarowski | Prudential Center (9,736); Newark, NJ |
| February 15, 2020; 6:30 pm, FS1 | No. 23 | DePaul | W 93–64 | 20–6 (9–4) | 24 – Alexander | 9 – Ballock | 8 – Alexander | CHI Health Center Omaha (17,865); Omaha, NE |
| February 18, 2020; 7:30 pm, FS1 | No. 15 | at No. 19 Marquette | W 73–65 | 21–6 (10–4) | 22 – Alexander | 8 – Jefferson | 7 – Ballock | Fiserv Forum (14,329); Milwaukee, WI |
| February 23, 2020; 3:00 pm, FS1 | No. 15 | No. 21 Butler | W 81–59 | 22–6 (11–4) | 25 – Zegarowski | 7 – Bishop | 6 – Ballock | CHI Health Center Omaha (18,148); Omaha, NE |
| March 1, 2020; 11:00 am, FS1 | No. 10 | at St. John's | L 71–91 | 22–7 (11–5) | 20 – Jefferson | 8 – Jefferson | 5 – Bishop | Carnesecca Arena (4,260); Queens, NY |
| March 4, 2020; 7:00 pm, FSN | No. 11 | Georgetown | W 91–76 | 23–7 (12–5) | 20 – Tied | 6 – Jones | 8 – Zegarowski | CHI Health Center Omaha (17,696); Omaha, NE |
| March 7, 2020; 1:30 pm, FOX | No. 11 | No. 8 Seton Hall | W 77–60 | 24–7 (13–5) | 23 – Zegarowski | 6 – Tied | 5 – Zegarowski | CHI Health Center Omaha (18,519); Omaha, NE |
Big East tournament
| March 12, 2020; 12:00 pm, FS1 | (1) No. 7 | vs. (9) St. John's; Quarterfinals | (35-38 canceled @ Halftime) | | | | | Madison Square Garden; New York, NY |
*Non-conference game. ^{#}Rankings from AP Poll. (#) Tournament seedings in parentheses. All times are in Central Time.

== Rankings ==
Ranking movements Legend: ██ Increase in ranking ██ Decrease in ranking — = Not ranked RV = Received votes т = Tied with team above or below
| | Week | | | | | | | | | | | | | | | | | | | |
| Poll | Pre | 1 | 2 | 3 | 4 | 5 | 6 | 7 | 8 | 9 | 10 | 11 | 12 | 13 | 14 | 15 | 16 | 17 | 18 | Final |
|---|---|---|---|---|---|---|---|---|---|---|---|---|---|---|---|---|---|---|---|---|
| AP | RV | RV | — | — | — | — | — | RV | RV | RV | 25 | RV | RV | 21 | 23 | 15 | 10 | 11 | 7 | 7 |
| Coaches | RV | RV | RV | RV | — | RV | RV | RV | RV | RV | RV | RV | RV | 22 | 21 | 15 | 11 | 14 | 9 | 9-T |

*AP does not release post-NCAA Tournament rankings
