= 2019–20 Xavier Musketeers men's basketball team =

American college basketball season

2019–20 Xavier Musketeers men's basketball
- Conference: Big East Conference
- Record: 19–13 (8–10 Big East)
- Head coach: Travis Steele (2nd season)
- Assistant coaches: Jonas Hayes (2nd season); Ben Johnson (2nd season); Dante Jackson (2nd season)
- Home arena: Cintas Center

2019–20 Big East men's basketball standings
	Conf.				Overall
Team	W		L	PCT	W		L	PCT
No. 7 Creighton	13	–	5	.722	24	–	7	.774
No. 10 Villanova	13	–	5	.722	24	–	7	.774
No. 15 Seton Hall	13	–	5	.722	21	–	9	.700
Providence	12	–	6	.667	19	–	12	.613
No. 23 Butler	10	–	8	.556	22	–	9	.710
Marquette	8	–	10	.444	18	–	12	.600
Xavier	8	–	10	.444	19	–	13	.594
Georgetown	5	–	13	.278	15	–	17	.469
St. John's	5	–	13	.278	17	–	15	.531
DePaul	3	–	15	.167	16	–	16	.500
Note: The 2020 Big East tournament was cancelled at halftime of the first game of the quarterfinals due to the COVID-19 pandemic. Rankings from AP poll

The 2019–20 Xavier Musketeers men's basketball team represented Xavier University during the 2019–20 NCAA Division I men's basketball season as a member of the Big East Conference. Led by second-year head coach Travis Steele, they played their home games at the Cintas Center in Cincinnati, Ohio. They finished the season 19–13, 8–10 in Big East play to finish in a tie for sixth place. They lost in the first round of the Big East tournament to DePaul. Soon thereafter, all postseason tournaments were canceled due to the ongoing COVID-19 pandemic which effectively ended their season.

== Previous season ==
The Musketeers finished the 2018–19 season 19–16, 9–9 in Big East play to finish in third place. They defeated Creighton in the quarterfinals before losing to Villanova in the semifinals of the Big East tournament. The Musketeers failed to receive a bid to a postseason tournament.

== Offseason ==
=== Departures ===
Name	Number	Pos.	Height	Weight	Year	Hometown	Reason for departure
Kyle Castlin	2	G	6'4"	193	Graduate Student	Marietta, GA	Graduated
Elias Harden	4	G	6'5"	187	Sophomore	East Point, GA	Transferred to Jacksonville State
Keonte Kennedy	11	G	6'5"	187	Freshman	Aurora, CO	Transferred to UTEP
Ryan Welage	32	F	6'10"	205	Graduate Student	Greensburg, IN	Graduated
Zach Hankins	35	F	6'11"	245	Graduate Student	Charlevoix, MI	Graduated

=== Incoming transfers ===
Name	Number	Pos.	Height	Weight	Year	Hometown	Previous School
Bryce Moore	11	G	6'3"	180	Graduate Student	Indianapolis, IN	Transferred from Western Michigan after graduating. Will have one year of eligibility beginning immediately.
Jason Carter	25	F	6'8"	227	RS Junior	Johnstown, OH	Transferred from Ohio after graduating. Will have two years of eligibility beginning immediately.

=== 2019 recruiting class ===
College recruiting information
Name	Hometown	School	Height	Weight	Commit date
KyKy Tandy; CG	Hopkinsville, KY	University Heights Academy	6 ft 1 in (1.85 m)	190 lb (86 kg)	Oct 28, 2018
KyKy Tandy; CG	Recruit ratings: Scout: Rivals: 247Sports: ESPN: (84)				
Dahmir Bishop; SG	Philadelphia, PA	Imhotep Institute	6 ft 4 in (1.93 m)	175 lb (79 kg)	Sep 14, 2018
Dahmir Bishop; SG	Recruit ratings: Scout: Rivals: 247Sports: ESPN: (82)				
Zach Freemantle; C	Teaneck, NJ	Bergen Catholic HS	6 ft 9 in (2.06 m)	215 lb (98 kg)	Aug 21, 2018
Zach Freemantle; C	Recruit ratings: Scout: Rivals: 247Sports: ESPN: (81)				
Daniel Ramsey; PF	Norcross, GA	Norcross HS	6 ft 8 in (2.03 m)	220 lb (100 kg)	Aug 6, 2018
Daniel Ramsey; PF	Recruit ratings: Scout: Rivals: 247Sports: ESPN: (81)				
Dieonte Miles; C	Walton, KY	Walton-Verona HS	6 ft 10 in (2.08 m)	210 lb (95 kg)	Aug 25, 2018
Dieonte Miles; C	Recruit ratings: Scout: Rivals: 247Sports: ESPN: (81)				
Overall recruit ranking:
Note: In many cases, Scout, Rivals, 247Sports, On3, and ESPN may conflict in their listings of height and weight.; In these cases, the average was taken. ESPN grades are on a 100-point scale.; Sources: "2019 Xavier Signees". Rivals.; "2019 Team Ranking". Rivals.

== Roster ==
2019–20 Xavier Musketeers men's basketball team
Players
Coaches

Pos.	#	Name	Height	Weight	Year	Previous school	Hometown
F	0	Daniel Ramsey	6 ft 9 in (2.06 m)	233 lb (106 kg)	Fr	Norcross HS	Cordele, GA
G	1	Paul Scruggs	6 ft 4 in (1.93 m)	196 lb (89 kg)	Jr	Prolific Prep	Indianapolis, IN
G	2	Dahmir Bishop (T)	6 ft 5 in (1.96 m)	178 lb (81 kg)	Fr	Imhotep Institute	Philadelphia, PA
G	3	Quentin Goodin	6 ft 4 in (1.93 m)	194 lb (88 kg)	Sr	Taylor County HS	Campbellsville, KY
F	4	Tyrique Jones	6 ft 9 in (2.06 m)	239 lb (108 kg)	Sr	Vermont Academy	Bloomfield, CT
G	10	Leighton Schrand	6 ft 2 in (1.88 m)	166 lb (75 kg)	Sr	Holy Cross HS	Villa Hills, KY
G	11	Bryce Moore	6 ft 3 in (1.91 m)	194 lb (88 kg)	GS	Western Michigan	Indianapolis, IN
F	12	Dontarius James	6 ft 7 in (2.01 m)	228 lb (103 kg)	So	Huntington Prep	Kershaw, SC
F	13	Naji Marshall	6 ft 7 in (2.01 m)	220 lb (100 kg)	Jr	Hargrave Military Academy	Atlantic City, NJ
G	15	Spencer Cody (W)	6 ft 0 in (1.83 m)	170 lb (77 kg)	Fr	DePaul Prep	Chicago, IL
G	20	Ramon Singh (W)	6 ft 4 in (1.93 m)	187 lb (85 kg)	So	La Lumiere School	Sydney, Australia
G	21	Zak Swetye (W)	6 ft 1 in (1.85 m)	170 lb (77 kg)	So	Darien HS	Darien, CT
F	22	Dieonte Miles	6 ft 11 in (2.11 m)	208 lb (94 kg)	Fr	Walton-Verona HS	Walton, KY
G	24	KyKy Tandy	6 ft 2 in (1.88 m)	190 lb (86 kg)	Fr	University Heights Academy	Hopkinsville, KY
F	25	Jason Carter	6 ft 8 in (2.03 m)	227 lb (103 kg)	RS Jr	Ohio	Johnstown, OH
F	32	Zach Freemantle	6 ft 9 in (2.06 m)	225 lb (102 kg)	Fr	Bergen Catholic HS	Teaneck, NJ
G	34	Myles Hanson (W)	6 ft 7 in (2.01 m)	215 lb (98 kg)	RS So	Columbia	Chaska, MN

Head coach

- Travis Steele (Butler)

Assistant coach(es)

- Jonas Hayes (Georgia)
- Ben Johnson (Minnesota)
- Dante Jackson (Xavier)

Legend

- (C) Team captain
- (S) Suspended
- (I) Ineligible
- (W) Walk-on
- (T) Transferred
- Injured
- Current redshirt

Roster
Last update: 2019-10-31

- Jan 2, 2020 - Dahmir Bishop entered the transfer portal. Bishop would ultimately transfer to Saint Joseph's.

== Schedule and results ==
Date time, TV	Rank^{#}	Opponent^{#}	Result	Record	High points	High rebounds	High assists	Site (attendance) city, state
Exhibition
October 30, 2019*; 7:00 pm	No. 19	Indianapolis	W 64–52	–	16 – Goodin	13 – Marshall	5 – Goodin	Cintas Center (9,663); Cincinnati, OH
Non-conference regular season
November 5, 2019*; 7:00 pm, FS2	No. 19	Jacksonville	W 76–57	1–0	17 – Tied	11 – Jones	4 – Marshall	Cintas Center (10,050); Cincinnati, OH
November 8, 2019*; 7:00 pm, FSN	No. 19	Siena	W 81–63	2–0	20 – Tied	8 – Marshall	7 – Marshall	Cintas Center (10,430); Cincinnati, OH
November 12, 2019*; 7:00 pm, CBSSN	No. 21	Missouri	W 63–58 ^{OT}	3–0	17 – Marshall	10 – Carter	3 – Marshall	Cintas Center (10,224); Cincinnati, OH
November 15, 2019*; 7:00 pm, FSN	No. 21	Missouri State; Charleston Classic campus game	W 59–56	4–0	15 – Jones	6 – Jones	6 – Goodin	Cintas Center (10,463); Cincinnati, OH
November 21, 2019*; 7:00 pm, ESPNU	No. 18	vs. Towson; Charleston Classic quarterfinals	W 73–51	5–0	13 – Carter	12 – Jones	5 – Tied	TD Arena; Charleston, SC
November 22, 2019*; 9:30 pm, ESPNU	No. 18	vs. UConn; Charleston Classic semifinal	W 75–74 ^{2OT}	6–0	21 – Marshall	11 – Jones	4 – Goodin	TD Arena (4,416); Charleston, SC
November 24, 2019*; 8:30 pm, ESPN	No. 18	vs. Florida; Charleston Classic championship game	L 65–70	6–1	24 – Scruggs	7 – Jones	4 – Tied	TD Arena (4,233); Charleston, SC
November 30, 2019*; 12:00 pm, FSN	No. 25	Lipscomb	W 87–62	7–1	15 – Tied	10 – Jones	6 – Scruggs	Cintas Center (9,960); Cincinnati, OH
December 4, 2019*; 7:00 pm, FS2		Green Bay	W 84–71	8–1	24 – Marshall	14 – Jones	3 – Tied	Cintas Center (10,129); Cincinnati, OH
December 7, 2019*; 5:00 pm, FS1		Cincinnati; Crosstown Shootout	W 73–66	9–1	31 – Marshall	9 – Jones	8 – Goodin	Cintas Center (10,811); Cincinnati, OH
December 14, 2019*; 4:00 pm, ACCN	No. 23	at Wake Forest; Skip Prosser Classic	L 78–80	9–2	30 – Scruggs	11 – Jones	5 – Goodin	LJVM Coliseum (5,847); Winston-Salem, NC
December 18, 2019*; 6:30 pm, FS1		Western Carolina	W 74–61	10–2	25 – Goodin	11 – Jones	6 – Jones	Cintas Center (9,907); Cincinnati, OH
December 22, 2019*; 5:00 pm, ESPN2		at TCU; Big East/Big 12 Battle	W 67–59	11–2	18 – Jones	14 – Jones	11 – Goodin	Schollmaier Arena (6,445); Fort Worth, TX
Big East regular season
December 30, 2019; 6:30 pm, FS1		at No. 10 Villanova	L 62–68	11–3 (0–1)	19 – Marshall	10 – Jones	6 – Scruggs	Finneran Pavilion (6,501); Villanova, PA
January 5, 2020; 4:30 pm, FOX		St. John's	W 75–67	12–3 (1–1)	20 – Marshall	12 – Jones	5 – Goodin	Cintas Center (10,254); Cincinnati, OH
January 8, 2020; 8:30 pm, FS1		Seton Hall	L 71–83	12–4 (1–2)	18 – Jones	9 – Jones	7 – Goodin	Cintas Center (9,832); Cincinnati, OH
January 11, 2020; 2:00 pm, FOX		Creighton	L 65–77	12–5 (1–3)	21 – Marshall	9 – Tied	7 – Marshall	Cintas Center (10,529); Cincinnati, OH
January 15, 2020; 8:00 pm, FSN		at Marquette	L 65–85	12–6 (1–4)	16 – Jones	7 – Marshall	5 – Scruggs	Fiserv Forum (13,761); Milwaukee, WI
January 22, 2020; 6:30 pm, FS1		Georgetown	W 66–57	13–6 (2–4)	18 – Tied	13 – Jones	5 – Tied	Cintas Center (10,387); Cincinnati, OH
January 26, 2020; 4:00 pm, FS1		at Creighton	L 66–77	13–7 (2–5)	18 – Freemantle	13 – Jones	6 – Scruggs	CHI Health Center Omaha (17,796); Omaha, NE
January 29, 2020; 8:30 pm, FS1		Marquette	L 82–84 ^{2OT}	13–8 (2–6)	19 – Goodin	15 – Jones	5 – Marshall	Cintas Center (10,224); Cincinnati, OH
February 1, 2020; 11:00 am, FOX		at No. 10 Seton Hall	W 74–62	14–8 (3–6)	19 – Tied	18 – Jones	14 – Marshall	Prudential Center (12,230); Newark, NJ
February 4, 2020; 9:00 pm, FS1		at DePaul	W 67–59	15–8 (4–6)	13 – Scruggs	18 – Jones	4 – Marshall	Wintrust Arena (4,526); Chicago, IL
February 8, 2020; 8:00 pm, FS1		Providence	W 64–58	16–8 (5–6)	14 – Jones	18 – Jones	5 – Scruggs	Cintas Center (10,575); Cincinnati, OH
February 12, 2020; 6:30 pm, CBSSN		at No. 19 Butler	L 61–66	16–9 (5–7)	20 – Marshall	10 – Jones	7 – Marshall	Hinkle Fieldhouse (8,878); Indianapolis, IN
February 17, 2020; 6:30 pm, FS1		at St. John’s	W 77–74	17–9 (6–7)	16 – Scruggs	11 – Marshall	5 – Marshall	Madison Square Garden (14,765); New York, NY
February 22, 2020; 2:30 pm, FOX		No. 12 Villanova	L 55–64	17–10 (6–8)	17 – Jones	14 – Jones	5 – Scruggs	Cintas Center (10,647); Cincinnati, OH
February 25, 2020; 7:00 pm, CBSSN		DePaul	W 78–67	18–10 (7–8)	23 – Marshall	6 – Tied	6 – Tied	Cintas Center (10,224); Cincinnati, OH
March 1, 2020; 2:00 pm, CBS		at Georgetown	W 66–63	19–10 (8–8)	20 – Marshall	13 – Jones	5 – Marshall	Capital One Arena (10,610); Washington, DC
March 4, 2020; 6:30 pm, FS1		at Providence	L 74–80	19–11 (8–9)	25 – Marshall	9 – Jones	4 – Goodin	Dunkin' Donuts Center (11,736); Providence, RI
March 7, 2020; 8:30 pm, FS1		Butler	L 71–72	19–12 (8–10)	21 – Marshall	13 – Jones	5 – Marshall	Cintas Center; Cincinnati, OH
Big East tournament
March 11, 2020; 9:30 pm, FS1	(7)	vs. (10) DePaul; First round	L 67–71	19–13	–	–	–	Madison Square Garden; New York City, NY
*Non-conference game. ^{#}Rankings from AP Poll. (#) Tournament seedings in parentheses. All times are in Eastern Time.

== Rankings ==
Ranking movements Legend: ██ Increase in ranking ██ Decrease in ranking — = Not ranked RV = Received votes
	Week																				
Poll	Pre	1	2	3	4	5	6	7	8	9	10	11	12	13	14	15	16	17	18	19	Final
AP	19	21	18	25	RV	23	RV	RV	RV	RV	—	—	—	—	—	—	—	—			Not released
Coaches	21	21*	21	23	RV	RV	RV	RV	RV	RV	RV	—	—	—	—	—	—	—			
