= 2019–20 Providence Friars men's basketball team =

American college basketball season

2019–20 Providence Friars men's basketball
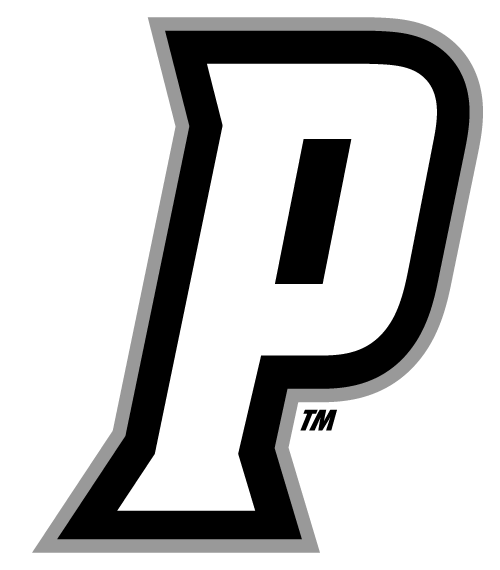
- Conference: Big East Conference
- Record: 19–12 (12–6 Big East)
- Head coach: Ed Cooley (9th season)
- Assistant coaches: Jeff Battle (5th season); Brian Blaney (9th season); Ivan Thomas (5th season)
- Home arena: Dunkin' Donuts Center

2019–20 Big East men's basketball standings
	Conf.				Overall
Team	W		L	PCT	W		L	PCT
No. 7 Creighton	13	–	5	.722	24	–	7	.774
No. 10 Villanova	13	–	5	.722	24	–	7	.774
No. 15 Seton Hall	13	–	5	.722	21	–	9	.700
Providence	12	–	6	.667	19	–	12	.613
No. 23 Butler	10	–	8	.556	22	–	9	.710
Marquette	8	–	10	.444	18	–	12	.600
Xavier	8	–	10	.444	19	–	13	.594
Georgetown	5	–	13	.278	15	–	17	.469
St. John's	5	–	13	.278	17	–	15	.531
DePaul	3	–	15	.167	16	–	16	.500
Note: The 2020 Big East tournament was cancelled at halftime of the first game of the quarterfinals due to the COVID-19 pandemic. Rankings from AP poll

The 2019–20 Providence Friars men's basketball team represented Providence College in the 2019–20 NCAA Division I men's basketball season. The Friars, led by ninth-year head coach Ed Cooley, played their home games at the Dunkin' Donuts Center as members of the Big East Conference.

At the time of the cancellation of the 2020 NCAA Division I men's basketball tournament, the Friars were listed as a projected member of the tournament field by every major college basketball publication.

== Previous season ==
The Friars finished the 2018–19 season 18–16, 7–11 in Big East play to finish in a three-way tie for last place. As the No. 8 seed in the Big East tournament, they defeated Butler before losing to Villanova in the quarterfinals. They received an at-large bid to the NIT as the No. 4 seed in the Indiana bracket where they lost to Arkansas in the first round.

== Offseason ==
=== Departures ===
Name	Number	Pos.	Height	Weight	Year	Hometown	Reason for departure
Makai Ashton–Langford	1	G	6'3"	185	Sophomore	Worcester, MA	Transferred to Boston College
Drew Edwards	25	F	6'4"	190	RS Junior	Perry Hall, MD	Graduate Transfer to Charlotte
Isaiah Jackson	44	G	6'6"	225	RS Senior	Gainesville, FL	Graduated

=== Incoming transfers ===
Name	Number	Pos.	Height	Weight	Year	Hometown	Previous school
Luwane Pipkins	12	G	5'11"	180	Grad Student	Chicago, IL	UMass
Noah Horchler	14	F	6'8"	210	Senior	Melbourne Beach, FL	North Florida
Jared Bynum	21	G	5'10"	175	Sophomore	Largo, MD	Saint Joseph's

=== 2019 recruiting class ===
College recruiting
Name	Hometown	School	Height	Weight	Commit date
Greg Gantt; SF	Fayetteville, NC	Trinity Christian School	6 ft 7 in (2.01 m)	195 lb (88 kg)	Jul 27, 2018
Greg Gantt; SF	Recruit ratings: Scout: Rivals: 247Sports: (86)				
Overall recruit ranking:
Note: In many cases, Scout, Rivals, 247Sports, On3, and ESPN may conflict in their listings of height and weight.; In these cases, the average was taken. ESPN grades are on a 100-point scale.; Sources: "2019 Team Ranking". Rivals.

== Roster ==
2019–20 Providence Friars men's basketball team
Players
Coaches

Pos.	#	Name	Height	Weight	Year	Previous school	Hometown
C	0	Nate Watson	6 ft 10 in (2.08 m)	250 lb (113 kg)	Jr	Bishop O'Connell High School	Arlington, Virginia
F	1	Greg Gantt	6 ft 8 in (2.03 m)	205 lb (93 kg)	Fr	Trinity Christian School	Fayetteville, North Carolina
F	2	Kris Monroe	6 ft 8 in (2.03 m)	220 lb (100 kg)	So	St. David's School	Creedmoor, North Carolina
G	3	David Duke	6 ft 5 in (1.96 m)	200 lb (91 kg)	So	Cushing Academy	Providence, Rhode Island
G	4	Maliek White	6 ft 3 in (1.91 m)	190 lb (86 kg)	Sr	George Wythe High School	Richmond, Virginia
F	5	Jimmy Nichols, Jr.	6 ft 8 in (2.03 m)	220 lb (100 kg)	So	Conway High School	Conway, South Carolina
G	10	A. J. Reeves	6 ft 6 in (1.98 m)	205 lb (93 kg)	So	Brimmer and May School	Roxbury, Massachusetts
G	11	Alpha Diallo	6 ft 7 in (2.01 m)	210 lb (95 kg)	Sr	Brewster Academy	New York, New York
G	12	Luwane Pipkins	5 ft 11 in (1.8 m)	180 lb (82 kg)	GS	Bogan High School; UMass	Chicago, Illinois
F	13	Kalif Young	6 ft 9 in (2.06 m)	250 lb (113 kg)	Sr	Orangeville Prep	Vaughan, Ontario
F	14	Noah Horchler (redshirt)	6 ft 8 in (2.03 m)	210 lb (95 kg)	Sr	Melbourne High School; North Florida	Melbourne Beach, Florida
F	15	Emmitt Holt	6 ft 7 in (2.01 m)	230 lb (104 kg)	GS	Webster Schroeder; Indian Hills CC	Rochester, New York
G	21	Jared Bynum (redshirt)	5 ft 10 in (1.78 m)	175 lb (79 kg)	So	Georgetown Prep; Saint Joseph's	Largo, Maryland
G	22	Tommy Dempsey (W)	6 ft 2 in (1.88 m)	175 lb (79 kg)	Fr	Seton Catholic Central High School	Binghamton, New York
G	24	Andrew Fonts (W)	6 ft 2 in (1.88 m)	175 lb (79 kg)	Jr	Portsmouth Abbey School	Portsmouth, Rhode Island

Head coach

- Ed Cooley (Stonehill)

Assistant coach(es)

- Jeff Battle (Marshall)
- Brian Blaney (Roanoke)
- Ivan Thomas (VCU)

Legend

- (C) Team captain
- (S) Suspended
- (I) Ineligible
- (W) Walk-on
- Injured
- Current redshirt

Roster
Last update: 2019-11-01

== Schedule and results ==
Date time, TV	Rank^{#}	Opponent^{#}	Result	Record	High points	High rebounds	High assists	Site (attendance) city, state
Exhibition
October 19, 2019*; 3:00 pm		Stonehill; Exhibition	W 87–68	–	23 – Diallo	13 – Holt	6 – Duke	Dunkin' Donuts Center (3,469); Providence, RI
Non-conference regular season
November 5, 2019*; 7:00 pm, FSN		Sacred Heart	W 106–60	1–0	19 – Diallo	14 – Diallo	8 – Duke	Dunkin' Donuts Center (8,103); Providence, RI
November 9, 2019*; 4:30 pm, FSN		NJIT	W 76–47	2–0	21 – Duke	10 – Diallo	5 – Tied	Dunkin' Donuts Center (7,102); Providence, RI
November 13, 2019*; 9:00 pm, BTN		at Northwestern; Gavitt Tipoff Games	L 63–72	2–1	15 – Diallo	14 – Diallo	4 – White	Welsh–Ryan Arena (5,204); Evanston, IL
November 16, 2019*; 2:00 pm, FS2		Saint Peter's	W 68–47	3–1	17 – Duke	9 – Diallo	7 – Pipkins	Dunkin' Donuts Center (8,063); Providence, RI
November 19, 2019*; 7:00 pm, FSN		Merrimack	W 93–56	4–1	18 – Pipkins	10 – Holt	8 – Pipkins	Dunkin' Donuts Center (7,251); Providence, RI
November 23, 2019*; 4:00 pm, FS2		Penn	L 75-81	4–2	20 – White	8 – Diallo	7 – Pipkins	Dunkin' Donuts Center (10,649); Providence, RI
November 28, 2019*; 2:00 pm, ESPNU		vs. Long Beach State; Wooden Legacy quarterfinals	L 65–66	4–3	12 – Pipkins	9 – Diallo	5 – Pipkins	Anaheim Arena; Anaheim, CA
November 29, 2020*; 4:30 pm, ESPNU		vs. Charleston; Wooden Legacy 2nd round consolation	L 55–63	4–4	22 – Duke	6 – Diallo	5 – Duke	Anaheim Arena (1,158); Anaheim, CA
December 1, 2019*; 3:30 pm, ESPNU		vs. Pepperdine; Wooden Legacy 7th place game	W 80–77	5–4	15 – Tied	9 – Diallo	6 – Diallo	Anaheim Arena; Anaheim, CA
December 6, 2019*; 7:00 pm, ESPN2		at Rhode Island; Ocean State Cup	L 61–75	5–5	13 – Diallo	9 – Young	3 – Tied	Ryan Center (8,052); Kingston, RI
December 14, 2019*; 8:00 pm, FS1		Stony Brook	W 82–78	6–5	21 – Tied	12 – Diallo	7 – Pipkins	Dunkin' Donuts Center (5,861); Providence, RI
December 17, 2019*; 7:00 pm, ESPN2		vs. Florida; Basketball Hall of Fame Invitational	L 51–83	6–6	20 – Diallo	12 – Diallo	2 – White	Barclays Center (17,732); Brooklyn, NY
December 21, 2019*; 2:00 pm, FOX		Texas; Big East/Big 12 Battle	W 70–48	7–6	14 – Diallo	12 – Diallo	5 – Diallo	Dunkin' Donuts Center (9,876); Providence, RI
Big East regular season
December 31, 2019; 5:30 pm, FS1		Georgetown	W 76–60	8–6 (1–0)	20 – Diallo	8 – Diallo	8 – Duke	Dunkin' Donuts Center (10,980); Providence, RI
January 4, 2020; 2:00 pm, FS1		at DePaul	W 66–65	9–6 (2–0)	16 – Tied	6 – Tied	5 – Duke	Wintrust Arena (4,945); Chicago, IL
January 7, 2020; 7:00 pm, FS1		at Marquette	W 81–80 ^{OT}	10–6 (3–0)	19 – White	11 – Diallo	5 – Duke	Fiserv Forum (14,414); Milwaukee, WI
January 10, 2020; 9:00 pm, FS1		No. 6 Butler	L 58–70	10–7 (3–1)	21 – Diallo	6 – Diallo	2 – Tied	Dunkin' Donuts Center (10,674); Providence, RI
January 15, 2020; 8:30 pm, FSN		St. John's	W 63–58	11–7 (4–1)	19 – Diallo	8 – Young	4 – Duke	Dunkin' Donuts Center (9,542); Providence, RI
January 18, 2020; 4:30 pm, FS1		at No. 25 Creighton	L 74–78	11–8 (4–2)	36 – Duke	10 – Young	3 – Tied	CHI Health Center Omaha (17,048); Omaha, NE
January 22, 2020; 8:30 pm, FS1		at No. 10 Seton Hall	L 64–73	11–9 (4–3)	13 – Diallo	8 – Diallo	5 – Duke	Prudential Center (9,267); Newark, NJ
January 25, 2020; 1:00 pm, CBS		No. 9 Villanova	L 60–64	11–10 (4–4)	18 – Watson	10 – Duke	2 – White	Dunkin' Donuts Center (12,927); Providence, RI
February 1, 2020; 2:00 pm, FS1		at No. 16 Butler	W 65–61	12–10 (5–4)	22 – Pipkins	9 – Young	2 – 4 Tied	Hinkle Fieldhouse (9,132); Indianapolis, IN
February 5, 2020; 7:00 pm, FSN		No. 21 Creighton	W 73–56	13–10 (6–4)	22 – Reeves	7 – Young	6 – White	Dunkin' Donuts Center (10,102); Providence, RI
February 8, 2020; 8:00 pm, FS1		at Xavier	L 58–64	13–11 (6–5)	16 – Watson	7 – Watson	7 – White	Cintas Center (10,575); Cincinnati, OH
February 12, 2020; 8:30 pm, CBSSN		at St. John's	L 69–80	13–12 (6–6)	19 – Diallo	17 – Diallo	4 – Tied	Carnesecca Arena (4,083); Queens, NY
February 15, 2020; 8:00 pm, CBSSN		No. 10 Seton Hall	W 74–68	14–12 (7–6)	35 – Diallo	10 – Diallo	3 – White	Dunkin' Donuts Center (13,255); Providence, RI
February 19, 2019; 8:30 pm, FS1		at Georgetown	W 73–63	15–12 (8–6)	18 – Diallo	9 – Young	7 – White	Capital One Arena (7,371); Washington, D.C.
February 22, 2020; 12:00 pm, FOX		No. 19 Marquette	W 84–72	16–12 (9–6)	24 – Pipkins	5 – Watson	4 – Tied	Dunkin' Donuts Center (12,805); Providence, RI
February 29, 2020; 12:00 pm, FOX		at No. 12 Villanova	W 58–54	17–12 (10–6)	27 – Pipkins	7 – Young	2 – Tied	Wells Fargo Center (15,516); Philadelphia, PA
March 4, 2020; 6:30 pm, FS1		Xavier	W 80–74	18–12 (11–6)	25 – Diallo	5 – Tied	4 – Diallo	Dunkin' Donuts Center (11,736); Providence, RI
March 7, 2020; 6:30 pm, FS1		DePaul	W 93–55	19–12 (12–6)	19 – Reeves	8 – Tied	5 – Pipkins	Dunkin' Donuts Center (12,103); Providence, RI
Big East tournament
March 12, 2020; 2:30 pm, FS1	(4)	vs. (5) No. 24 Butler; Quarterfinals						Madison Square Garden; New York City, NY
*Non-conference game. ^{#}Rankings from AP Poll. (#) Tournament seedings in parentheses. All times are in Central Time.

== Rankings ==
Ranking movements Legend: RV = Received votes
	Week																			
Poll	Pre	1	2	3	4	5	6	7	8	9	10	11	12	13	14	15	16	17	18	Final
AP	RV																			Not released
Coaches	RV																			
