= 2020 Big East men's basketball tournament =

U.S. college basketball tournament

- Classification: Division I
- Season: 2019–20
- Teams: 10
- Site: Madison Square Garden; New York City
- Television: FS1, Fox

2019–20 Big East men's basketball standings
	Conf.				Overall
Team	W		L	PCT	W		L	PCT
No. 7 Creighton	13	–	5	.722	24	–	7	.774
No. 10 Villanova	13	–	5	.722	24	–	7	.774
No. 15 Seton Hall	13	–	5	.722	21	–	9	.700
Providence	12	–	6	.667	19	–	12	.613
No. 23 Butler	10	–	8	.556	22	–	9	.710
Marquette	8	–	10	.444	18	–	12	.600
Xavier	8	–	10	.444	19	–	13	.594
Georgetown	5	–	13	.278	15	–	17	.469
St. John's	5	–	13	.278	17	–	15	.531
DePaul	3	–	15	.167	16	–	16	.500
Note: The 2020 Big East tournament was cancelled at halftime of the first game of the quarterfinals due to the COVID-19 pandemic. Rankings from AP poll

The 2020 Big East men's basketball tournament was the postseason tournament men's basketball tournament for the Big East Conference. It was to have been held from March 11 through March 14, 2020, at Madison Square Garden in New York City.

The two first-round games were played on March 11. Early on March 12, amid concerns over the spreading COVID-19 pandemic in the United States, the Big East Conference issued a statement that it would limit attendance during the rest of the tournament to players, coaches, team staff, event staff, essential media, and immediate family members. The first quarterfinal game, with Creighton facing St. John's, began on March 12, but during halftime, with St. John's leading 38–35, the Big East Conference cancelled the rest of the game and all remaining tournament games in order to further reduce the possibility of spreading the SARS-CoV-2 virus responsible for cases of COVID-19. It was the first cancellation of the tournament since its foundation in 1980. Despite the cancellation of the tournament, the conference was able to receive an insurance payout of $10.5 million as a result of the tournament's insurance policy.

The winner was to have received the conference's bid to the 2020 NCAA tournament, which also was cancelled on March 12, 2020.

== Seeds ==
All 10 Big East schools were slated to participate in the tournament. Teams were seeded by the conference record with tie-breaking procedures to determine the seeds for teams with identical conference records. The top six teams received first-round byes. Seeding for the tournament was determined at the close of the regular conference season.

Seed	School	Conference	Tiebreaker 1
1	Creighton	13–5	3–1 vs. Villanova/Seton Hall
2	Villanova	13–5	2–2 vs. Creighton/Seton Hall
3	Seton Hall	13–5	1–3 vs. Creighton/Villanova
4	Providence	12–6	
5	Butler	10–8	
6	Marquette	8–10	2–0 vs. Xavier
7	Xavier	8–10	0–2 vs. Marquette
8	Georgetown	5–13	2–0 vs. St. John's
9	St. John's	5–13	0–2 vs. Georgetown
10	DePaul	3–15	

== Schedule ==
Game	Time	Matchup	Score	Television	Attendance
First round – Wednesday, March 11
1	7:00 pm	No. 8 Georgetown vs. No. 9 St. John's	62–75	FS1	17,534
2	9:30 pm	No. 7 Xavier vs. No. 10 DePaul	67–71	FS1	17,534
Quarterfinals – Thursday, March 12
3	12:00 pm	No. 1 Creighton vs. No. 9 St. John's (cancelled at halftime)	35–38 (halftime)	FS1	N/A*
4	2:30 pm	No. 4 Providence vs. No. 5 Butler	cancelled		
5	7:00 pm	No. 2 Villanova vs. No. 10 DePaul	cancelled		
6	9:30 pm	No. 3 Seton Hall vs. No. 6 Marquette	cancelled		
Semifinals – Friday, March 13
7	6:30 pm	Game 3 Winner vs. Game 4 Winner	cancelled		
8	9:00 pm	Game 5 Winner vs. Game 6 Winner	cancelled		
Championship – Saturday, March 14
9	6:30 pm	Game 7 Winner vs. Game 8 Winner	cancelled		
Game times in Eastern Time. Rankings denote tournament seed. *Attendance by the general public was restricted due to the COVID-19 pandemic

== Bracket ==
First round Wednesday, March 11; FS1
8	Georgetown	62
9	St. John's	75
7	Xavier	67
10	DePaul	71

Quarterfinals; Thursday, March 12; FS1
1	#7 Creighton	35
9	St. John's (canceled halftime)	38 (halftime)
4	Providence	cancelled
5	#24 Butler
2	#11 Villanova	cancelled
10	DePaul
3	#16 Seton Hall	cancelled
6	Marquette

Semifinals; Friday, March 13; FS1
cancelled
cancelled

Championship; Saturday, March 14; Fox
cancelled

== See also ==
- 2020 Big East women's basketball tournament
