= A. J. Reeves =

American basketball player (born 1999)

Free agent
- Position: Shooting guard

Personal information
- Born: June 4, 1999 (age 27)
- Listed height: 6 ft 6 in (1.98 m)
- Listed weight: 205 lb (93 kg)

Career information
- High school: Swampscott (Swampscott, Massachusetts); Brimmer and May (Chestnut Hill, Massachusetts)
- College: Providence (2018–2022)
- NBA draft: 2022: undrafted
- Playing career: 2022–present

Career history
- 2022–2023: Maine Celtics
- 2024: Rio Grande Valley Vipers
- 2025: Rip City Remix
- 2025: Birmingham Squadron
- Stats at Basketball Reference
Medals
Representing the United States
Pan American Games
Bronze medal – third place	2019 Peru	Team

Andre Reeves Jr. (born June 4, 1999) is an American professional basketball player who last played for the Birmingham Squadron of the NBA G League. He played college basketball for the Providence Friars of the Big East Conference.

== High school career ==
Reeves attended Brimmer and May School in Chestnut Hill, Massachusetts. He was a First Team All-New England Prep School Athletic Council honoree as a junior. As a senior, Reeves averaged 27.9 points, 9.1 rebounds, 5.2 assists and 2.1 steals per game. He was named Gatorade Massachusetts player of the year. Regarded as a four-star recruit, he was ranked the 55th best player in his class and the 6th best shooting guard by ESPN. On June 25, 2017, Reeves committed to playing college basketball for Providence, choosing the Friars over Louisville, Villanova, and Virginia.

== College career ==
In his freshman debut, Reeves scored 29 points in a 77–67 win over Siena, setting the Providence record for most points in a game by a freshman in their first game. He was named Big East Freshman of the Week three times in the first month of the season, but was hampered by a foot injury suffered in December 2018 which kept him sidelined for several weeks. As a freshman, Reeves averaged 9.8 points and 3 rebounds per game. Reeves struggled with his shooting during his sophomore season and sought out a sports psychologist. He averaged 7.4 points and 3.1 rebounds per game as a sophomore and made 16 starts. As a junior, Reeves averaged 9.6 points, 3.6 rebounds and 1.7 assists per game, shooting 35.3% from the floor. In the offseason, he transformed his diet to lose 20 pounds. On January 1, 2022, Reeves sustained an injury to a finger on his non-shooting hand in a win against DePaul, forcing him to miss several games. As a senior, Reeves averaged 9.9 points and 2.8 rebounds per game, shooting 37.3% from three-point range.

== Professional career ==
=== Maine Celtics (2022–2023) ===
After going undrafted in the 2022 NBA draft, Reeves signed an Exhibit 10 deal with the Boston Celtics in October 2022, and after being waived, began the season with their G League affiliate the Maine Celtics.

On September 25, 2023, Reeves' rights were traded to the Long Island Nets and on October 28, he joined them. However, he was waived by the Nets on November 8.

On October 28, 2024, Reeves signed with the Memphis Hustle, but was waived on November 4.

=== Rio Grande Valley Vipers (2024) ===
On November 18, 2024, Reeves joined the Rio Grande Valley Vipers. However, he was waived on December 5.

=== Rip City Remix (2025) ===
On December 9, 2024, Reeves joined the Rip City Remix, but was waived on December 16 before playing for them. On January 8, 2025, he rejoined Rip City, but was waived ten days later.

=== Birmingham Squadron (2025–present) ===
On February 4, 2025, Reeves joined the Birmingham Squadron.

== National team career ==
Reeves represented the United States at the 2019 Pan American Games in Peru, helping his team win the bronze medal.

== Career statistics ==
Legend
GP	Games played	GS	Games started	MPG	Minutes per game
FG%	Field goal percentage	3P%	3-point field goal percentage	FT%	Free throw percentage
RPG	Rebounds per game	APG	Assists per game	SPG	Steals per game
BPG	Blocks per game	PPG	Points per game	**Bold**	Career high

=== College ===
Year	Team	GP	GS	MPG	FG%	3P%	FT%	RPG	APG	SPG	BPG	PPG
2018–19	Providence	25	21	22.7	**.423**	**.381**	.705	3.0	.6	**1.0**	.1	9.8
2019–20	Providence	**28**	16	21.9	.374	.342	.667	3.1	1.2	.8	**.2**	7.4
2020–21	Providence	26	**26**	**31.5**	.353	.320	**.846**	**3.6**	1.7	**1.0**	.1	9.6
2021–22	Providence	**28**	25	25.3	.369	.373	.787	2.8	**2.0**	.4	**.2**	**9.9**
Career		107	88	25.3	.378	.354	.758	3.1	1.4	.8	.1	9.1
