= 2018–19 Big East Conference men's basketball season =

- League: NCAA Division I
- Sport: Basketball
- Teams: 10
- TV partner(s): CBS, CBSSN, FOX, FS1, FSN

Regular Season
- Season Champions: Villanova
- Runners-up: Marquette
- Season MVP: Markus Howard, Marquette

Tournament
- Champions: Villanova
- Runners-up: Seton Hall
- Finals MVP: Phil Booth, Villanova

Basketball seasons
- ← 2017–18 2019–20 →

2018–19 Big East men's basketball standings
	Conf.				Overall
Team	W		L	PCT	W		L	PCT
No. 23 Villanova †	13	–	5	.722	26	–	10	.722
Marquette	12	–	6	.667	24	–	10	.706
Seton Hall	9	–	9	.500	20	–	14	.588
Xavier	9	–	9	.500	19	–	16	.543
Creighton	9	–	9	.500	20	–	15	.571
Georgetown	9	–	9	.500	19	–	14	.576
St. John's	8	–	10	.444	21	–	13	.618
Providence	7	–	11	.389	18	–	16	.529
Butler	7	–	11	.389	16	–	17	.485
DePaul	7	–	11	.389	19	–	17	.528
† 2019 Big East tournament winner Rankings from AP Poll

The 2018–19 Big East Conference men's basketball season began with practices in October 2018, followed by the start of the 2018–19 NCAA Division I men's basketball season in November. This season marked the 40th year in the conference's history, but the sixth as a non-football conference, which officially formed on July 1, 2013. Conference play began in December 2018.

The 2019 Big East men's basketball tournament was held at Madison Square Garden in New York from March 13 through March 17, 2019. Villanova defeated Seton Hall to win the tournament championship and receive the conference's automatic bid to the NCAA tournament.

Four Big East schools received bids to the NCAA Tournament (Marquette, Seton Hall, St. John's, and Villanova). Villanova was the only team to make it out of the Round of 64 before losing to Purdue in the Round of 32.

Five Big East schools received bids to the National Invitation Tournament (Creighton, Xavier, Georgetown, Providence, and Butler) with only Creighton and Xavier advancing past the 1st Round, with the Bluejays making to the Quarterfinals before losing to TCU.

Marquette guard Markus Howard was named the Big East Player of the Year after leading the Big East in scoring with 25.0 PPG. Georgetown freshman guard James Akinjo was named Big East Freshman of the Year. Villanova head coach Jay Wright was named Big East coach of the year for the sixth time.

== Head coaches ==
=== Coaching changes ===
On March 27, 2018, Chris Mack was hired as the new head coach of Louisville, leaving Xavier after nine seasons. Four days later, longtime assistant coach Travis Steele was named the new head coach of the Musketeers.

=== Coaches ===
Team	Head coach	Previous job	Years at school	Overall record	Big East record	Big East titles	NCAA Tournaments	NCAA Final Fours	NCAA Championships
Butler	LaVall Jordan	Milwaukee	2	21–14	9–9	0	1	0	0
Creighton	Greg McDermott	Iowa State	9	187–94	47–43	0	5	0	0
DePaul	Dave Leitao	Tulsa (asst.)	7	87–99	39–63	0	0	0	0
Georgetown	Patrick Ewing	Charlotte Hornets (asst.)	2	34–29	14–22	0	0	0	0
Marquette	Steve Wojciechowski	Duke (asst.)	5	73–59	31–41	0	1	0	0
Providence	Ed Cooley	Fairfield	8	144–94	64–62	1	5	0	0
Seton Hall	Kevin Willard	Iona	9	150–114	62–82	0	2	0	0
St. John's	Chris Mullin	None	4	39–60	12–42	0	0	0	0
Villanova	Jay Wright	Hofstra	18	422–165	191–103	6	13	3	2
Xavier	Travis Steele	Xavier (asst.)	1	0–0	0–0	0	0	0	0

Notes:

- Years at school includes 2018–19 season.
- Overall and Big East records are from time at current school and are through the end of the 2018–19 season.
- McDermott's MVC conference records not included since team began play in Big East.

== Preseason ==
=== Preseason poll ===
Prior to the season, the Big East conducted a poll of Big East coaches, coaches do not place their own team on their ballots.

Rank	Team
1.	Villanova (8)
2.	Marquette (1)
3.	Providence
4.	St. John's
5.	Butler (1)
6.	Xavier
7.	Georgetown
8.	Seton Hall
9.	Creighton
10.	DePaul
(first place votes)

=== Preseason All-Big East teams ===
Honor	Recipient
Preseason Player of the Year	Shamorie Ponds, St. John's
Preseason All-Big East First Team	Shamorie Ponds, St. John's
Preseason All-Big East First Team	Eric Paschall, Villanova
Preseason All-Big East First Team	Markus Howard, Maquette
Preseason All-Big East First Team	Kamar Baldwin, Butler
Preseason All-Big East First Team	Jessie Govan, Georgetown
Preseason All-Big East First Team	Alpha Diallo, Providence
Preseason All-Big East Second Team	Phil Booth, Villanova
Preseason All-Big East Second Team	Myles Powell, Seton Hall
Preseason All-Big East Second Team	Max Strus, DePaul
Preseason All-Big East Second Team	Sam Hauser, Marquette
Preseason All-Big East Second Team	Justin Simon, St. John's
Preseason All-Big East Honorable Mention	Martin Krampelj, Creighton
Preseason All-Big East Honorable Mention	Naji Marshall, Xavier

== Regular season ==
=== Rankings ===
Legend
Increase in ranking
Decrease in ranking
Not ranked previous week
() First place votes

		Pre	Wk 2	Wk 3	Wk 4	Wk 5	Wk 6	Wk 7	Wk 8	Wk 9	Wk 10	Wk 11	Wk 12	Wk 13	Wk 14	Wk 15	Wk 16	Wk 17	Wk 18	Wk 19	Final
Butler	AP																				
Butler	C																				
Creighton	AP																				
Creighton	C																				
DePaul	AP																				
DePaul	C																				
Georgetown	AP																				
Georgetown	C																				
Marquette	AP		24				21	20	18	16	21	15	12	10	10	10	11	10	16	23	RV
Marquette	C							23	20	18	19	13	11	9	9	10	10	9	15	22	T-25
Providence	AP																				
Providence	C																				
Seton Hall	AP																				
Seton Hall	C																				
St. John's	AP										24										
St. John's	C																				
Villanova	AP	9 (1)	8		23	21	17					22	18	14	14	13	17	RV	23	25	23
Villanova	C	8	8		23	21	16					21	18	14	13	13	16	RV	23	25	22
Xavier	AP																				
Xavier	C																				

=== Conference matrix ===
This table summarizes the head-to-head results between teams in conference play.

	Butler	Creighton	DePaul	Georgetown	Marquette	Providence	Seton Hall	St. John's	Villanova	Xavier
vs. Butler	–	1–1	0–2	1–1	2–0	2–0	1–1	1–1	2–0	1–1
vs. Creighton	1–1	–	0–2	0–2	1–1	0–2	2–0	2–0	2–0	1–1
vs. DePaul	2–0	2–0	–	1–1	2–0	1–1	0–2	0–2	2–0	1–1
vs. Georgetown	1–1	2–0	1–1	–	1–1	0–2	1–1	1–1	1–1	1–1
vs. Marquette	0–2	1–1	0–2	1–1	–	0–2	1–1	2–0	1–1	0–2
vs. Providence	0–2	2–0	1–1	2–0	2–0	–	1–1	0–2	2–0	1–1
vs. Seton Hall	1–1	0–2	2–0	1–1	1–1	1–1	–	1–1	1–1	1–1
vs. St. John's	1–1	0–2	2–0	1–1	0–2	2–0	1–1	–	1–1	2–0
vs. Villanova	0–2	0–2	0–2	1–1	1–1	0–2	1–1	1–1	–	1–1
vs. Xavier	1–1	1–1	1–1	1–1	2–0	1–1	1–1	0–2	1–1	–
Total	7–11	9–9	7–11	9–9	12–6	7–11	9–9	8–10	13–5	9–9

=== Player of the week ===
Throughout the season, the Big East Conference named a player of the week and a freshman of the week each Monday.

Week	Player of the week	Freshman of the week
November 12, 2018	Markus Howard, Marquette	A. J. Reeves, Providence
November 19, 2018	Max Strus, DePaul	James Akinjo, Georgetown
November 26, 2018	Shamorie Ponds, St. John's	A. J. Reeves (2), Providence
December 3, 2018	Markus Howard (2), Marquette	A. J. Reeves (3), Providence
December 10, 2018	Myles Powell, Seton Hall	Joey Hauser, Marquette
December 17, 2018	Max Strus (2), DePaul	Marcus Zegarowski, Creighton
December 23, 2018	Markus Howard (3), Marquette	Mac McClung, Georgetown
December 31, 2018	Naji Marshall, Xavier	Josh LeBlanc, Georgetown
January 7, 2019	Shamorie Ponds (2), St. John's	Joey Hauser (2), Marquette
January 14, 2019	Markus Howard (4), Marquette	James Akinjo (2), Georgetown
January 21, 2019	Sam Hauser, Marquette	Joey Hauser (3), Marquette
January 28, 2019	Ty-Shon Alexander, Creighton	Joey Hauser (4), Marquette
February 4, 2019	Markus Howard (5), Marquette	James Akinjo (3), Georgetown
February 11, 2019	Markus Howard (6), Marquette	Mac McClung (2), Georgetown
February 18, 2019	Mustapha Heron, St. John's	Saddiq Bey, Villanova
February 25, 2019	Naji Marshall (2), Xavier	Joey Hauser (5), Marquette
March 4, 2019	Max Strus (3), DePaul	Josh LeBlanc (2), Georgetown
March 10, 2019	Myles Powell (2), Seton Hall	James Akinjo (4), Georgetown

== Honors and awards ==
=== All-Americans ===
Consensus All-Americans
First Team	Second Team
None	Markus Howard - Marquette

To earn "consensus" status, a player must win honors based on a point system computed from the four different all-America teams. The point system consists of three points for first team, two points for second team and one point for third team. No honorable mention or fourth team or lower are used in the computation. The top five totals plus ties are first team and the next five plus ties are second team.

Associated Press	NABC	Sporting News	USBWA
First Team
None	None	None	None
Second Team
Markus Howard – Marquette	Markus Howard – Marquette	Markus Howard – Marquette	Markus Howard – Marquette
Third Team
None	None	None	None

=== Big East Awards ===
2019 Big East Men's Basketball Individual Awards
Award	Recipient(s)
Player of the Year	Markus Howard, G., Marquette
Coach of the Year	Jay Wright, Villanova
Defensive Player of the Year	Justin Simon, G., St. John's
Freshman of the Year	James Akinjo, G., Georgetown
Most Improved Player of the Year	Paul Reed, F., DePaul
Scholar-Athlete of the Year	Michael Nzei, F., Seton Hall
Sixth Man Award	Paul Jorgensen, G., Butler
Sportsmanship Award	Nate Fowler, C., Butler

2019 Big East Men's Basketball All-Conference Teams
First Team	Second Team	Honorable Mention	All-Freshman Team
Markus Howard† – Marquette; Myles Powell† – Seton Hall; Phil Booth† – Villanova; Eric Paschall† – Villanova; Shamorie Ponds – St. John's; Jessie Govan – Georgetown	Kamar Baldwin – Butler; Max Strus – DePaul; Sam Hauser – Marquette; Alpha Diallo – Providence; Naji Marshall – Xavier	Ty-Shon Alexander - Creighton; Martin Krampelj - Creighton	Marcus Zegarowski† – Creighton; James Akinjo† – Georgetown; Josh LeBlanc – Georgetown; Mac McClung – Georgetown; Joey Hauser – Marquette; Saddiq Bey - Villanova
† - denotes unanimous selection

== Postseason ==
=== 2019 Big East tournament ===
==== Bracket ====
First round Wednesday, March 13; FS1
8	Providence	80
9	Butler	57
7	St. John's	82
10	DePaul	74

Quarterfinals; Thursday, March 14; FS1
1	Villanova	73
8	Providence	62
4	Xavier	63
5	Creighton	61
2	Marquette	86
7	St. John's	54
3	Seton Hall	73
6	Georgetown	57

Semifinals; Friday, March 15; FS1
1	Villanova	71*
4	Xavier	67
2	Marquette	79
3	Seton Hall	81

Championship; Saturday, March 16; FOX
1	Villanova	74
3	Seton Hall	72

*Indicates number of overtime periods.

=== 2019 NCAA tournament ===
Seed	Region	School	First Four	1st Round	2nd Round	Sweet Sixteen	Elite Eight	Final Four	Championship
5	West	Marquette	BYE	L 64–83 vs. Murray State – (Hartford, CT)					
6	South	Villanova	BYE	W 61–57 vs. Saint Mary's – (Hartford, CT)	L 61–87 vs. Purdue – (Hartford, CT)				
10	Midwest	Seton Hall	BYE	L 68–84 vs. Wofford – (Jacksonville, FL)					
11	West	St. John's	L 65–74 vs. Arizona State – (Dayton, OH)						
		W–L (%):	0–1 (.000)	1–2 (.333)	0–1 (.000)	0–0 (–)	0–0 (–)	0–0 (–)	0–0 (–) Total: 1–4 (.200)

=== 2019 NIT ===
Seed	Region	School	1st Round	2nd Round	Quarterfinals	Semifinals	Championship
2	TCU	Creighton	W 70–61 vs. Loyola–Chicago – (Omaha, NE)	W 79–67 vs. Memphis – (Omaha, NE)	L 58–71 vs. TCU – (Fort Worth, TX)		
3	Alabama	Xavier	W 78–64 vs. Toledo – (Cincinnati, OH)	L 76–78 (OT) vs. Texas – (Austin, TX)			
3	UNCG	Georgetown	L 68–71 vs. Harvard – (Washington, DC)				
4	Indiana	Providence	L 72–84 vs. Arkansas – (Providence, RI)				
5	TCU	Butler	L 76–80 vs. Nebraska – (Lincoln, NE)				
		W–L (%):	2–3 (.400)	1–1 (.500)	0–1 (.000)	0–0 (–)	0–0 (–) Total: 3–5–0 (.375)

=== 2019 CBI ===
School	1st Round	Quarterfinals	Semifinals	Championship
DePaul	W 100–86 vs. Central Michigan – (Chicago, IL)	W 97–89 vs. Longwood – (Chicago, IL)	W 92–87 vs. Coastal Carolina – (Chicago, IL)	L vs. South Florida – (Tampa, FL/Chicago, IL)
W–L (%):	1–0 (1.000)	1–0 (1.000)	1–0 (1.000)	1–2 (.333) Total: 4–2 (.667)
