= 2018–19 St. Francis Brooklyn Terriers men's basketball team =

American college basketball season

2018–19 St. Francis Brooklyn Terriers men's basketball

CIT, First Round
- Conference: Northeast Conference
- Record: 17–16 (9–9 NEC)
- Head coach: Glenn Braica (9th season)
- Assistant coaches: Clive Bentick (12th season); Ron Ganulin (6th season); Jamaal Womack (6th season)
- Home arena: Generoso Pope Athletic Complex

2018–19 Northeast Conference men's basketball standings
	Conf.				Overall
Team	W		L	PCT	W		L	PCT
Saint Francis (PA)	12	–	6	.667	18	–	15	.545
Fairleigh Dickinson †	12	–	6	.667	21	–	14	.600
Sacred Heart	11	–	7	.611	15	–	17	.469
Robert Morris	11	–	7	.611	18	–	17	.514
St. Francis Brooklyn	9	–	9	.500	17	–	16	.515
LIU Brooklyn	9	–	9	.500	16	–	16	.500
Wagner	8	–	10	.444	13	–	17	.433
Bryant	7	–	11	.389	10	–	20	.333
Mount St. Mary's	6	–	12	.333	9	–	22	.290
Central Connecticut	5	–	13	.278	11	–	20	.355
† 2019 NEC tournament winner

The 2018–19 St. Francis Brooklyn Terriers men's basketball team represented St. Francis College during the 2018–19 NCAA Division I men's basketball season. The Terriers' home games were played at the Generoso Pope Athletic Complex in Brooklyn, New York. The team had been a member of the Northeast Conference (NEC) since 1981. They were coached by Glenn Braica, who was in his ninth year at the helm of the Terriers.

The Terriers' Northeast Conference record was 9–9, earning them the fifth seed in the NEC tournament. In the opening round of the tournament, they lost to fourth-seeded Robert Morris, 65–69 in overtime. The Terriers' 17 wins in the 2018–19 campaign were the most since the 2013–14 season when they won 18 games.

On March 13, it was announced that the Terriers were selected to participate in the 2019 CollegeInsider.com Postseason Tournament. They lost in the first round to Hampton.

== Previous season ==
The Terriers finished the 2017–18 season 13–18, 10–8 in NEC play. It marked a return to the NEC tournament as the Terriers gained the #5 seed and lost on the road to #4 LIU Brooklyn.

== Offseason ==
The Terriers unveiled a new basketball floor located in the Pope Physical Education Center. The new court replaced the original one that was installed in 1969.

=== Departures ===
Name	Number	Pos.	Height	Weight	Year	Hometown	Notes
Rasheem Dunn	0	G	6' 2"	170	Junior	Brooklyn, NY	Transferred to Cleveland State, then to St. John's
Darelle Porter	23	G	6' 6"	185	Senior	Pittsburgh, PA	Graduated
Jagos Lasic	33	F	6' 8"	200	Senior	Belgrade, Serbia	Graduated
Gunnar Ólafsson	4	G/F	6' 3"	195	Senior	Reykjavík, Iceland	Graduated

=== Class of 2018 signees ===
College recruiting information
Name	Hometown	School	Height	Weight	Commit date
Stevan Krtinic; PG	Novi Sad, Serbia	Carnegie Schools Riverside	6 ft 5 in (1.96 m)	193 lb (88 kg)	April 26, 2018
Stevan Krtinic; PG	Recruit ratings: No ratings found				
Larry Moreno; PG	Brooklyn, NY	Brooklyn High School For Law & Technology	5 ft 11 in (1.80 m)	148 lb (67 kg)	November 13, 2017
Larry Moreno; PG	Recruit ratings: No ratings found				
Overall recruit ranking:
Note: In many cases, Scout, Rivals, 247Sports, On3, and ESPN may conflict in their listings of height and weight.; In these cases, the average was taken. ESPN grades are on a 100-point scale.; Sources: "2018 St. Francis Brooklyn Signees". Rivals.; "2018 St. Francis Brooklyn Signees". Scout.; "2018 St. Francis Brooklyn Signees". ESPN.; "Scout.com Team Recruiting Rankings". Scout.; "2018 Team Ranking". Rivals.; "2018 St. Francis Brooklyn Signees". 247Sports.

=== Incoming transfers ===
Name	Number	Pos.	Height	Weight	Year	Hometown	Previous school
Christian Rohlehr	41	C	6' 9"	228	Junior	Ontario, Canada	Junior college transfer from Jefferson CC
Deniz Celen	33	F	6' 8"	234	Junior	Ankara, Turkey	Junior college transfer from Harcum College
Rosel Hurley	2	G	6' 5"	191	Junior	Cleveland, OH	Junior college transfer from New Mexico Military Institute

== Regular season ==
St. Francis Brooklyn completed the non-conference portion of their schedule with an 8–7 record. The Terriers had road wins against Lafayette, Niagara and a tough Presbyterian squad that finished the season 20–16. At home the Terriers defeated Manhattan, Saint Peter's and UMass Lowell. The eight non-conference wins were one shy of tying the NEC non-conference wins record which the Terriers set in 2013–14. The eight non-conference wins were one shy of tying the NEC non-conference wins record which the Terriers set in 2013–14.

The Terriers' Northeast Conference schedule resulted in a 9–9 record, which was good for a fifth-place finish. St. Francis's margin of victory over the course of their 18 NEC contests was only 0.5 points (70.3 to 69.8).

== Postseason ==
After finishing the regular season 17–15 the Terriers were selected to participate in the 2019 CIT. This was their first winning season since 2014–15 when they went 23–12 and were invited to the 2015 NIT. In the tournament, the Terriers faced Hampton, their first game against each other in history. The Terriers lost to Hampton 72–81 in the opening round of the CIT.

== Roster ==
2018–19 St. Francis Brooklyn Terriers men's basketball team
Players
Coaches

Pos.	#	Name	Height	Weight	Year	Previous school	Hometown
G	10	Glenn Sanabria (C)	5 ft 11 in (1.8 m)	180 lb (82 kg)	RS Sr	St. Peter's Boys High School	Staten Island, NY
F	13	Keon Williams	6 ft 4 in (1.93 m)	185 lb (84 kg)	RS Sr	John Hardin High School	Atlanta, GA
F	11	Joshua Nurse	6 ft 9 in (2.06 m)	210 lb (95 kg)	Sr	Queens High School of Teaching	Laurelton, NY
F	21	Milija Cosic	6 ft 6 in (1.98 m)	220 lb (100 kg)	RS Jr	Frank Phillips College	Belgrade, Serbia
C	20	Cori Johnson	6 ft 9 in (2.06 m)	270 lb (122 kg)	RS Jr	South Shore High School	Brooklyn, NY
G	2	Rosel Hurley	6 ft 5 in (1.96 m)	191 lb (87 kg)	Jr	Shaker Heights High School	Cleveland, OH
F	33	Deniz Celen (W)	6 ft 8 in (2.03 m)	234 lb (106 kg)	Jr	Harcum College	Ankara, Turkey
C	41	Christian Rohlehr	6 ft 9 in (2.06 m)	228 lb (103 kg)	Jr	Notre Dame High School	Ontario, Canada
F	40	Bryant Beckford (W)	6 ft 5 in (1.96 m)	190 lb (86 kg)	So	IMG Academy	Bronx, NY
G	14	Jalen Jordan	6 ft 3 in (1.91 m)	155 lb (70 kg)	So	National Top Sports Institute	Conyers, GA
G	4	Chauncey Hawkins	5 ft 8 in (1.73 m)	140 lb (64 kg)	So	Saint Joseph Regional High School	Spring Valley, NY
F	5	Yaradyah Evans	6 ft 6 in (1.98 m)	190 lb (86 kg)	RS So	South Shore High School	Brooklyn, NY
G	45	Jordan Williams	6 ft 4 in (1.93 m)	185 lb (84 kg)	So	St. Edmund Prep	Brooklyn, NY
G	1	Stevan Krtinic	6 ft 5 in (1.96 m)	193 lb (88 kg)	Fr	Carnegie Schools Riverside	Novi Sad, Serbia
G	0	Larry Moreno (redshirt)	5 ft 11 in (1.8 m)	148 lb (67 kg)	Fr	Brooklyn High School For Law & Technology	Brooklyn, NY

Head coach

- Glenn Braica (Queens College)

Assistant coach(es)

- Clive Bentick (Canisius)
- Ron Ganulin (LIU)
- Jamaal Womack (St. Francis)

Legend

- (C) Team captain
- (S) Suspended
- (I) Ineligible
- (W) Walk-on
- Injured
- Current redshirt

Roster
Last update: September 20, 2024

== Schedule and results ==
Date time, TV	Rank^{#}	Opponent^{#}	Result	Record	High points	High rebounds	High assists	Site (attendance) city, state
Non-conference regular season
November 7, 2018*; 7:00 p.m.		Medgar Evers	W 92–42	1–0	15 – Krtinic	12 – Rohlehr	7 – Hawkins	Generoso Pope Athletic Complex (386); Brooklyn, NY
November 11, 2018*; 7:00 p.m.		at Boston College; Fort Myers Tip-off	L 69–74	1–1	22 – Jordan	8 – Jordan	3 – Sanabria	Conte Forum (3,974); Chestnut Hill, MA
November 14, 2018*; 11:00 a.m., ESPN+		at Richmond; Fort Myers Tip-off	L 66–88	1–2	14 – Sanabria	6 – Sanabria	3 – Sanabria	Robins Center (6,851); Richmond, VA
November 18, 2018*; 2:00 p.m., WBPH-TV		at Lafayette	W 84–72	2–2	26 – Hawkins	10 – Celen	3 – Sanabria	Kirby Sports Center (1,146); Easton, PA
November 23, 2018*; 7:00 p.m.		vs. IUPUI; Fort Myers Tip-off	L 48–68	2–3	12 – Jordan	6 – Evans	2 – Sanabria	Gallagher Center (910); Lewiston, NY
November 24, 2018*; 7:00 p.m.		at Niagara; Fort Myers Tip-off	W 75–63	3–3	22 – Hawkins	9 – Rohlehr, Williams	6 – Sanabria	Gallagher Center (837); Lewiston, NY
November 28, 2018*; 7:00 p.m., ESPN+		at Presbyterian	W 90–86	4–3	27 – Hawkins	7 – Hurley	5 – Hawkins	Templeton Physical Education Center (409); Clinton, SC
December 3, 2018*; 7:00 p.m.		St. Joseph's (Brooklyn)	W 104–75	5–3	19 – Jordan	8 – Rohlehr	4 – Jordan	Generoso Pope Athletic Complex (574); Brooklyn, NY
December 8, 2018*; 4:00 p.m., ESPN+		at NJIT	L 60–82	5–4	16 – Rohlehr	11 – Rohlehr	2 – Hawkins, Williams	Wellness and Events Center (525); Newark, NJ
December 11, 2018*; 7:00 p.m.		UMass Lowell	W 75–69	6–4	21 – Jordan, Sanabria	11 – Evans	3 – Sanabria	Generoso Pope Athletic Complex (518); Brooklyn, NY
December 15, 2018*; 4:00 p.m.		Saint Peter's	W 56–53	7–4	21 – Jordan	18 – Evans	4 – Celen	Generoso Pope Athletic Complex (448); Brooklyn, NY
December 19, 2018*; 6:30 p.m., FS1		at St. John's	L 52–86	7–5	16 – Hawkins	8 – Rohlehr	4 – Sanabria	Carnesecca Arena (5,151); Queens, NY
December 23, 2018*; 2:00 p.m.		Manhattan	W 72–56	8–5	16 – Sanabria	8 – Hurley	5 – Hurley	Generoso Pope Athletic Complex (612); Brooklyn, NY
Northeast Conference regular season
January 3, 2019; 7:00 p.m.		at Bryant	L 66–76	8–6 (0–1)	14 – Jordan, Sanabria	7 – Celen	3 – Sanabria	Chace Athletic Center (483); Smithfield, RI
January 5, 2019; 4:00 p.m.		at Wagner	W 66–59	9–6 (1–1)	23 – Jordan	9 – Celen	5 – Celen	Spiro Sports Center (1,303); Staten Island, NY
January 10, 2019; 9:00 p.m., CBSSN		Robert Morris	L 49–52	9–7 (1–2)	16 – Jordan	9 – Celen	2 – Hawkins, Hurley	Generoso Pope Athletic Complex (421); Brooklyn, NY
January 12, 2019; 4:00 p.m.		Saint Francis (PA)	W 72–68	10–7 (2–2)	23 – Sanabria	8 – Celen, Hurley	3 – Evans, Hawkins	Generoso Pope Athletic Complex (413); Brooklyn, NY
January 19, 2019; 4:00 p.m.		Sacred Heart	W 92–85	11–7 (3–2)	28 – Jordan	7 – Hurley	6 – Jordan	Generoso Pope Athletic Complex (471); Brooklyn, NY
January 21, 2019; 3:00 p.m., ESPN3		at LIU Brooklyn	W 79–70	12–7 (4–2)	20 – Jordan	7 – Jordan	4 – Sanabria	Steinberg Wellness Center (758); Brooklyn, NY
January 24, 2019; 7:00 p.m.		at Fairleigh Dickinson	L 58–60	12–8 (4–3)	19 – Hurley	10 – Celen, Evans	4 – Hurley	Rothman Center (592); Hackensack, NJ
January 26, 2019; 5:00 p.m.		at Mount St. Mary's	W 74–67	13–8 (5–3)	16 – Hurley	10 – Celen	4 – Celen	Knott Arena (3,011); Emmitsburg, MD
January 31, 2018; 7:00 p.m.		at Central Connecticut	L 72–78	13–9 (5–4)	23 – Jordan	7 – Evans	4 – Evans	William H. Detrick Gymnasium (894); New Britain, CT
February 2, 2019; 3:30 p.m.		at Sacred Heart	L 62–71	13–10 (5–5)	16 – Celen	15 – Evans	4 – Jordan	William H. Pitt Center (638); Fairfield, CT
February 7, 2019; 7:00 p.m.		Wagner	W 51–44	14–10 (6–5)	12 – Hurley	5 – Celen	2 – Hawkins, Krtinic	Generoso Pope Athletic Complex (478); Brooklyn, NY
February 9, 2019; 4:00 p.m.		Fairleigh Dickinson	L 73–84	14–11 (6–6)	14 – Hawkins	6 – Hurley, Jordan	3 – Hurley	Generoso Pope Athletic Complex (707); Brooklyn, NY
February 14, 2019; 7:00 p.m.		LIU Brooklyn; Battle of Brooklyn	W 83–76	15–11 (7–6)	17 – Sanabria	7 – Celen	3 – Sanabria	Generoso Pope Athletic Complex (672); Brooklyn, NY
February 16, 2019; 4:00 p.m.		Central Connecticut; Alumni Day	W 90–79	16–11 (8–6)	25 – Sanabria	7 – Celen	3 – Celen, Sanabria	Generoso Pope Athletic Complex (631); Brooklyn, NY
February 21, 2019; 7:00 p.m.		at Saint Francis (PA)	L 71–81	16–12 (8–7)	16 – Hawkins	4 – Williams	3 – Hurley	DeGol Arena (1,030); Loretto, PA
February 23, 2019; 5:00 p.m.		at Robert Morris	L 62–67	16–13 (8–8)	18 – Jordan	5 – 4 tied	3 – 4 tied	North Athletic Complex (1,016); Pittsburgh, PA
February 28, 2019; 7:00 p.m.		Bryant	W 74–66	17–13 (9–8)	14 – 2 tied	7 – 2 tied	5 – Celen	Generoso Pope Athletic Complex (428); Brooklyn, NY
March 2, 2018; 4:00 p.m.		Mount St. Mary's	L 71–73	17–14 (9–9)	16 – Hurley	6 – Hawkins	4 – Sanabria	Generoso Pope Athletic Complex (648); Brooklyn, NY
Northeast Conference tournament
March 6, 2019; 7:00 pm, NEC Front Row	(5)	at (4) Robert Morris; Quarterfinals	L 65–69 ^{OT}	17–15	15 – Sanabria	11 – Evans	5 – Sanabria	North Athletic Complex (1,016); Pittsburgh, PA
CollegeInsider.com Postseason Tournament
March 21, 2019*; 7:00 pm, ESPN+		at Hampton; First round Coach John McLendon Classic	L 72–81	17–16	19 – Krtinic	6 – Evans	5 – Sanabria	Hampton Convocation Center (3,124); Hampton, VA
*Non-conference game. ^{#}Rankings from AP poll. (#) Tournament seedings in parentheses. All times are in Eastern. (#) during NIT is seed within region.

== Accolades ==
Glenn Sanabria, redshirt senior guard

- Selected to All-NEC Third Team
- Selected to the National Association of Basketball Coaches (NABC) All-District 18 Second Team
- Selected to the 2019 Division I-AAA Athletics Directors Association Scholar-Athlete Team

Jalen Jordan, sophomore guard

- Selected to All-NEC Second Team
- Selected to the National Association of Basketball Coaches (NABC) All-District 18 Second Team

== See also ==
- 2018–19 St. Francis Brooklyn Terriers women's basketball team
