= 2018–19 Robert Morris Colonials men's basketball team =

American college basketball season

2018–19 Robert Morris Colonials men's basketball

CIT, Second round
- Conference: Northeast Conference
- Record: 18–17 (11–7 NEC)
- Head coach: Andrew Toole (9th season)
- Assistant coaches: Dave Fedor; Tray Woodall; Mike Iuzzolino
- Home arena: North Athletic Complex

2018–19 Northeast Conference men's basketball standings
	Conf.				Overall
Team	W		L	PCT	W		L	PCT
Saint Francis (PA)	12	–	6	.667	18	–	15	.545
Fairleigh Dickinson †	12	–	6	.667	21	–	14	.600
Sacred Heart	11	–	7	.611	15	–	17	.469
Robert Morris	11	–	7	.611	18	–	17	.514
St. Francis Brooklyn	9	–	9	.500	17	–	16	.515
LIU Brooklyn	9	–	9	.500	16	–	16	.500
Wagner	8	–	10	.444	13	–	17	.433
Bryant	7	–	11	.389	10	–	20	.333
Mount St. Mary's	6	–	12	.333	9	–	22	.290
Central Connecticut	5	–	13	.278	11	–	20	.355
† 2019 NEC tournament winner

The 2018–19 Robert Morris Colonials men's basketball team represented Robert Morris University during the 2018–19 NCAA Division I men's basketball season. The Colonials, led by ninth-year head coach Andrew Toole, played their home games at the North Athletic Complex in Pittsburgh, Pennsylvania as members of the Northeast Conference. They finished the season 18–17, 11–7 in NEC play to finish in fourth place. As the No. 4 seed in the NEC tournament, they defeated No. 5 seed St. Francis Brooklyn in the quarterfinals before losing in the semifinals to No. 2 seed Fairleigh Dickinson. They were invited to the 2019 CollegeInsider.com Postseason Tournament where they defeated Cornell in the first round before falling to Presbyterian College in the second round.

== Previous season ==
The Colonials finished the 2017–18 season, 16–17, 9–9 in NEC play to finish in a tie for sixth place. As the No. 7 seed in the NEC tournament, they upset No. 2 seed Mount St. Mary's in the quarterfinals, before losing in the semifinals to No. 1 seed Wagner.

== Roster ==
2018–19 Robert Morris Colonials men's basketball team
Players
Coaches

Pos.	#	Name	Height	Weight	Year	Previous school	Hometown
G	0	Josh Williams	6 ft 2 in (1.88 m)	195 lb (88 kg)	Sr	Akron	Akron, OH
G	1	Jon Williams	6 ft 1 in (1.85 m)	175 lb (79 kg)	So	St. Vincent–St. Mary	Akron, OH
F	2	David Cole	6 ft 7 in (2.01 m)	240 lb (109 kg)	RS So	Christ the King	Corona, NY
G	3	Dante Treacy	6 ft 0 in (1.83 m)	170 lb (77 kg)	Fr	Central Florida Christian Academy	Orlando, FL
F	5	Malik Petteway	6 ft 8 in (2.03 m)	240 lb (109 kg)	Sr	Northwest Florida State	Waterbury, CT
F	10	Koby Thomas	6 ft 7 in (2.01 m)	190 lb (86 kg)	So	Imhotep Charter	Philadelphia, PA
F	11	Philmon Gebrewhit	6 ft 7 in (2.01 m)	185 lb (84 kg)	Fr	Holderness School	Boston, MA
G	12	Sayveon McEwen	6 ft 0 in (1.83 m)	185 lb (84 kg)	Jr	Paducah Tilghman	Paducah, KY
F	15	Yannis Mendy	6 ft 8 in (2.03 m)	240 lb (109 kg)	Jr	Lycee Saint John Perse	Metting, France
F	20	Charles Bain	6 ft 8 in (2.03 m)	200 lb (91 kg)	So	St. John's Northwestern Military Academy	Freeport, Bahamas
G	22	Cameron Wilbon	6 ft 5 in (1.96 m)	200 lb (91 kg)	Fr	Merrillville	Merrillville, IN
G	23	Matty McConnell	6 ft 2 in (1.88 m)	195 lb (88 kg)	Sr	Chartiers Valley	Oakdale, PA
F	24	Chris Coalmon	6 ft 6 in (1.98 m)	185 lb (84 kg)	So	Long Island Lutheran	North Babylon, NY

Head coach

- Andrew Toole (Pennsylvania)

Assistant coach(es)

- Dave Fedor (Rutgers)
- Tray Woodall (Pittsburgh)
- Mike Iuzzolino (Saint Francis (PA))

Legend

- (C) Team captain
- (S) Suspended
- (I) Ineligible
- (W) Walk-on
- Injured
- Current redshirt

Roster
Last update: January 18, 2019

== Schedule and results ==
Date time, TV	Rank^{#}	Opponent^{#}	Result	Record	Site (attendance) city, state
Exhibition
October 27, 2018*; 12:00 pm		at Kent State; Hurricane Relief Exhibition	L 62–89		MAC Center; Kent, OH
Non-conference regular season
November 6, 2018*; 11:00 pm, P12N		at USC; Hall of Fame Classic campus-site game	L 62–83	0–1	Galen Center (2,502); Los Angeles, CA
November 9, 2018*; 8:00 pm		at Missouri State; Hall of Fame Classic campus-site game	L 60–74	0–2	JQH Arena (5,038); Springfield, MO
November 14, 2018*; 7:30 pm		Mount Aloysius	W 104–57	1–2	North Athletic Complex (1,016); Pittsburgh, PA
November 17, 2018*; 7:00 pm		Mississippi Valley State; Hall of Fame Classic campus-site game	W 68–59	2–2	North Athletic Complex (1,016); Pittsburgh, PA
November 19, 2018*; 7:00 pm, ESPN+		at Stetson; Hall of Fame Classic campus-site game	W 81–72	3–2	Edmunds Center (454); DeLand, FL
November 23, 2018*; 2:00 pm		at Purdue	L 46–84	3–3	Mackey Arena (12,859); West Lafayette, IN
November 28, 2018*; 7:00 pm		Youngstown State	W 76–56	4–3	North Athletic Complex (1,016); Pittsburgh, PA
December 1, 2018*; 2:00 pm		at Drexel	L 69–82	4–4	Daskalakis Athletic Center (1,481); Philadelphia, PA
December 5, 2018*; 7:00 pm		at Canisius	L 62–68	4–5	Koessler Athletic Center (884); Buffalo, New York
December 8, 2018*; 4:00 pm		Siena	L 71–74	4–6	North Athletic Complex (1,016); Pittsburgh, PA
December 15, 2018*; 4:00 pm		at Rider	L 50–69	4–7	Alumni Gymnasium (1,425); Lawrenceville, NJ
December 21, 2018*; 4:00 pm, ACCN Extra		at Louisville	L 59–73	4–8	KFC Yum! Center (16,249); Louisville, KY
December 29, 2018*; 4:00 pm		Hood	W 108–51	5–8	North Athletic Complex (1,016); Pittsburgh, PA
NEC regular season
January 3, 2019; 7:00 pm		Fairleigh Dickinson	W 69–62	6–8 (1–0)	North Athletic Complex (1,016); Pittsburgh, PA
January 5, 2019; 5:00 pm		Mount St. Mary's	W 62–59	7–8 (2–0)	North Athletic Complex (1,016); Pittsburgh, PA
January 10, 2019; 9:00 pm, CBSSN		at St. Francis Brooklyn	W 52–49	8–8 (3–0)	Generoso Pope Athletic Complex (421); Brooklyn, NY
January 12, 2019; 4:30 pm		at LIU Brooklyn	L 73–80	8–9 (3–1)	Steinberg Wellness Center (572); Brooklyn, NY
January 19, 2019; 4:00 pm		at Bryant	W 79–65	9–9 (4–1)	Chace Athletic Center (533); Smithfield, RI
January 21, 2019; 3:30 pm		at Central Connecticut	W 70–59	10–9 (5–1)	William H. Detrick Gymnasium (985); New Britain, CT
January 24, 2019; 7:00 pm		Sacred Heart	W 72–64	11–9 (6–1)	North Athletic Complex (1,016); Pittsburgh, PA
January 26, 2019; 5:00 pm		Wagner	W 57–51	12–9 (7–1)	North Athletic Complex (1,016); Pittsburgh, PA
January 31, 2019; 7:00 pm		Saint Francis (PA)	L 73–76	12–10 (7–2)	North Athletic Complex (1,016); Pittsburgh, PA
February 2, 2019; 4:30 pm		at Fairleigh Dickinson	L 94–97 ^{2OT}	12–11 (7–3)	Rothman Center (610); Hackensack, NJ
February 7, 2019; 7:00 pm		Bryant	W 72–59	13–11 (8–3)	North Athletic Complex (1,016); Pittsburgh, PA
February 9, 2019; 4:00 pm		Central Connecticut	L 68–77	13–12 (8–4)	North Athletic Complex (1,016); Pittsburgh, PA
February 14, 2019; 7:00 pm		at Mount St. Mary's	L 62–76	13–13 (8–5)	Knott Arena (1,761); Emmitsburg, MD
February 16, 2019; 7:00 pm		at Saint Francis (PA)	L 69–72	13–14 (8–6)	DeGol Arena (1,828); Loretto, PA
February 21, 2019; 7:00 pm		LIU Brooklyn	W 62–49	14–14 (9–6)	North Athletic Complex (1,016); Pittsburgh, PA
February 23, 2019; 5:00 pm		St. Francis Brooklyn	W 67–62	15–14 (10–6)	North Athletic Complex (1,016); Pittsburgh, PA
February 28, 2019; 6:00 pm		at Sacred Heart	L 63–87	15–15 (10–7)	William H. Pitt Center (556); Fairfield, CT
March 2, 2019; 4:00 pm		at Wagner	W 69–60	16–15 (11–7)	Spiro Sports Center (1,558); Staten Island, NY
NEC tournament
March 6, 2019; 7:00 pm, NEC Front Row	(4)	(5) St. Francis Brooklyn; Quarterfinals	W 69–65 ^{OT}	17–15	North Athletic Complex (1,016); Pittsburgh, PA
March 9, 2019; 12:00 pm, ESPN3	(4)	(2) Fairleigh Dickinson; Semifinals	L 62–66	17–16	Rothman Center (1,212); Hackensack, NJ
CollegeInsider.com Postseason tournament
March 19, 2019*; 7:00 pm		Cornell; First round	W 98–89 ^{OT}	18–16	North Athletic Complex (622); Pittsburgh, PA
March 24, 2019*; 1:00 pm		Presbyterian; Second round	L 70–77	18–17	North Athletic Complex (541); Pittsburgh, PA
*Non-conference game. ^{#}Rankings from AP Poll. (#) Tournament seedings in parentheses. All times are in Eastern.
