= 2018–19 Bryant Bulldogs men's basketball team =

American college basketball season

2018–19 Bryant Bulldogs men's basketball
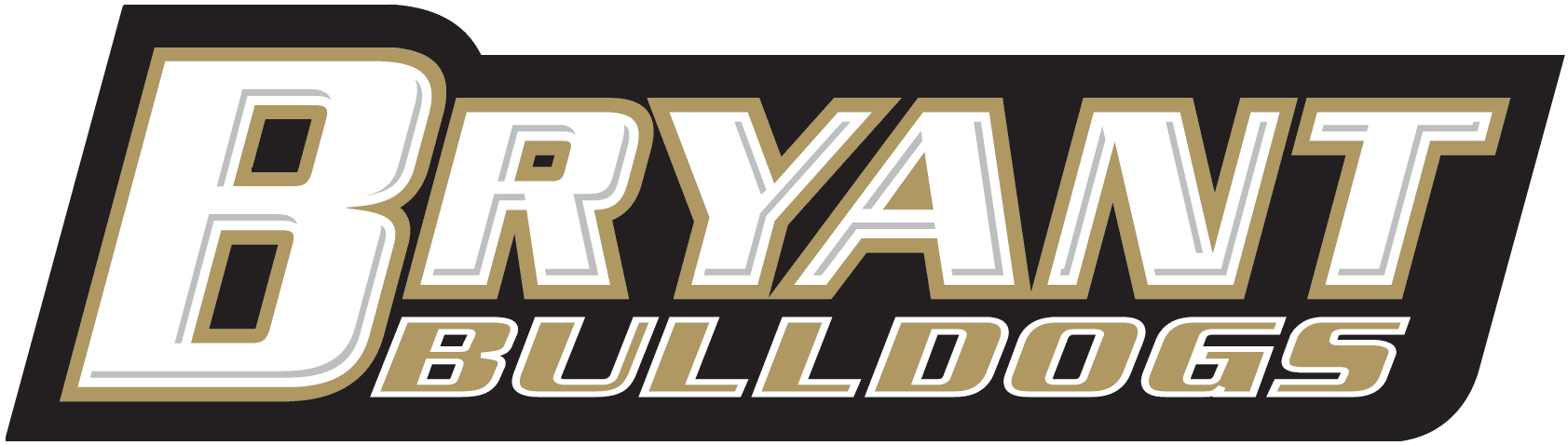
- Conference: Northeast Conference
- Record: 10–20 (7–11 NEC)
- Head coach: Jared Grasso (1st season)
- Assistant coaches: Brock Erickson; Phil Martelli, Jr.; Chris Cole
- Home arena: Chace Athletic Center

2018–19 Northeast Conference men's basketball standings
	Conf.				Overall
Team	W		L	PCT	W		L	PCT
Saint Francis (PA)	12	–	6	.667	18	–	15	.545
Fairleigh Dickinson †	12	–	6	.667	21	–	14	.600
Sacred Heart	11	–	7	.611	15	–	17	.469
Robert Morris	11	–	7	.611	18	–	17	.514
St. Francis Brooklyn	9	–	9	.500	17	–	16	.515
LIU Brooklyn	9	–	9	.500	16	–	16	.500
Wagner	8	–	10	.444	13	–	17	.433
Bryant	7	–	11	.389	10	–	20	.333
Mount St. Mary's	6	–	12	.333	9	–	22	.290
Central Connecticut	5	–	13	.278	11	–	20	.355
† 2019 NEC tournament winner

The 2018–2019 Bryant Bulldogs men's basketball team represented Bryant University during the 2018–19 NCAA Division I men's basketball season. The Bulldogs were led by first-year head coach Jared Grasso, and played their home games at the Chace Athletic Center in Smithfield, Rhode Island as members of the Northeast Conference. They finished the season 10–20 overall, 7–11 in NEC play to finish in eighth place. As the No. 8 seed in the NEC tournament, they lost in the quarterfinals to Saint Francis (PA).

== Previous season ==
The Bulldogs finished the 2017–18 season 3–28, 2–16 in NEC play to finish in last place. They failed to qualify for the NEC tournament.

On February 12, 2018, head coach Tim O'Shea announced that he would retire at the end of the season. He finished at Bryant with a ten-year record of 96–210. On April 2, the school hired Iona assistant Jared Grasso as head coach.

== Roster ==
2018–19 Bryant Bulldogs men's basketball team
Players
Coaches

Pos.	#	Name	Height	Weight	Year	Hometown
G	0	Ikenna Ndugba	6 ft 0 in (1.83 m)	185 lb (84 kg)	Jr	Boston, Massachusetts
F	1	Juan Cardenas	6 ft 7 in (2.01 m)	200 lb (91 kg)	Jr	Medellín, Colombia
G/F	2	Brandon Carroll	6 ft 7 in (2.01 m)	212 lb (96 kg)	RS So	Bronx, New York
G	3	Byron Hawkins	6 ft 1 in (1.85 m)	180 lb (82 kg)	RS Sr	Fort Washington, Maryland
G	5	Nino Hernandez	6 ft 4 in (1.93 m)	205 lb (93 kg)	Fr	Gardner, Massachusetts
G	10	Taylor McHugh	6 ft 2 in (1.88 m)	180 lb (82 kg)	Sr	Centreville, Virginia
G	11	Adam Grant	6 ft 1 in (1.85 m)	180 lb (82 kg)	Jr	Franklin, Virginia
F/C	13	Monty Urmilevicius	6 ft 8 in (2.03 m)	190 lb (86 kg)	RS Fr	Kaunas, Lithuania
G	21	Tanner Johnson	6 ft 5 in (1.96 m)	205 lb (93 kg)	So	Lexington, Kentucky
G	22	Joe Kasperzyk	6 ft 1 in (1.85 m)	185 lb (84 kg)	Fr	New Haven, Connecticut
C	24	Dren Dedushaj	7 ft 2 in (2.18 m)	245 lb (111 kg)	RS Fr	Brooklyn, New York
F	25	Patrick Harding	6 ft 9 in (2.06 m)	230 lb (104 kg)	Fr	Fairfield, Connecticut
F	54	Sabastian Townes	6 ft 5 in (1.96 m)	260 lb (118 kg)	Jr	Chesapeake, Virginia

Head coach

- Jared Grasso (Quinnipiac)

Assistant coach(es)

- Brock Erickson (Rhode Island)
- Phil Martelli, Jr. (Saint Joseph's)
- Chris Cole (New Mexico State)

Legend

- (C) Team captain
- (S) Suspended
- (I) Ineligible
- (W) Walk-on
- Injured
- Current redshirt

Roster
Last update: January 22, 2019

== Schedule and results ==
Date time, TV	Rank^{#}	Opponent^{#}	Result	Record	Site (attendance) city, state
Non-conference regular season
November 6, 2018*; 7:00 pm, ESPN+		at Rhode Island	L 64–97	0–1	Ryan Center (5,010); Kingston, RI
November 11, 2018*; 10:00 pm		at Seattle	L 59–82	0–2	ShoWare Center (1,236); Kent, WA
November 14, 2018*; 7:00 pm		Saint Peter's	W 71–63	1–2	Chace Athletic Center (687); Smithfield, RI
November 18, 2018*; 2:00 pm		at Navy	L 79–83	1–3	Alumni Hall (817); Annapolis, MD
November 25, 2018*; 6:00 pm, ESPN+		at Brown	L 60–84	1–4	Pizzitola Sports Center (927); Providence, RI
November 28, 2018*; 7:00 pm		Yale	L 61–103	1–5	Chace Athletic Center (982); Smithfield, RI
December 1, 2018*; 1:00 pm		New Hampshire	W 75–65	2–5	Chace Athletic Center (493); Smithfield, RI
December 7, 2018*; 7:00 pm		at Columbia	L 68–90	2–6	Levien Gymnasium (949); New York City, NY
December 12, 2018*; 7:00 pm		Hartford	L 74–91	2–7	Chace Athletic Center (418); Smithfield, RI
December 21, 2018*; 11:00 am		Dartmouth	W 68–67	3–7	Chace Athletic Center (674); Smithfield, RI
December 29, 2018*; 11:00 am, ESPNU		at No. 24 Iowa	L 67–72	3–8	Carver–Hawkeye Arena (13,726); Iowa City, IA
NEC regular season
January 3, 2019; 7:00 pm		St. Francis Brooklyn	W 76–66	4–8 (1–0)	Chace Athletic Center (483); Smithfield, RI
January 5, 2019; 4:00 pm		LIU Brooklyn	L 70–79	4–9 (1–1)	Chace Athletic Center (1,184); Smithfield, RI
January 10, 2019; 7:00 pm		at Mount St. Mary's	W 66–59	5–9 (2–1)	Knott Arena (1,085); Emmitsburg, MD
January 12, 2019; 2:00 pm		at Sacred Heart	L 70–98	5–10 (2–2)	William H. Pitt Center (536); Fairfield, CT
January 19, 2019; 4:00 pm		Robert Morris	L 65–79	5–11 (2–3)	Chace Athletic Center (533); Smithfield, RI
January 21, 2019; 5:00 pm		Saint Francis (PA)	W 76–67	6–11 (3–3)	Chace Athletic Center (433); Smithfield, RI
January 24, 2019; 7:00 pm		Central Connecticut	W 63–60	7–11 (4–3)	Chace Athletic Center (891); Smithfield, RI
January 26, 2019; 4:00 pm		Fairleigh Dickinson	L 63–78	7–12 (4–4)	Chace Athletic Center (847); Smithfield, RI
January 31, 2019; 7:00 pm, ESPN+		at Wagner	W 71–64	8–12 (5–4)	Spiro Sports Center (1,637); Staten Island, NY
February 2, 2019; 3:30 pm		at Central Connecticut	L 59–64	8–13 (5–5)	William H. Detrick Gymnasium; New Britain, CT
February 7, 2019; 7:00 pm		at Robert Morris	L 59–72	8–14 (5–6)	North Athletic Complex (1,016); Pittsburgh, PA
February 9, 2019; 7:00 pm		at Saint Francis (PA)	L 75–84	8–15 (5–7)	DeGol Arena (1,459); Loretto, PA
February 14, 2019; 7:00 pm		Sacred Heart	L 104–105	8–16 (5–8)	Chace Athletic Center (631); Smithfield, RI
February 16, 2019; 4:30 pm		at Fairleigh Dickinson	L 84–97	8–17 (5–9)	Rothman Center (576); Hackensack, NJ
February 21, 2019; 7:00 pm, CBSSN		Wagner	W 67–65	9–17 (6–9)	Chace Athletic Center (1,093); Smithfield, RI
February 23, 2019; 4:00 pm		Mount St. Mary's	W 81–58	10–17 (7–9)	Chace Athletic Center (1,171); Smithfield, RI
February 28, 2019; 7:00 pm		at St. Francis Brooklyn	L 66–74	10–18 (7–10)	Generoso Pope Athletic Complex (428); Brooklyn, NY
March 2, 2019; 4:30 pm		at LIU Brooklyn	L 65–81	10–19 (7–11)	Steinberg Wellness Center (721); Brooklyn, NY
NEC tournament
March 6, 2019; 7:00 pm, NEC Front Row	(8)	at (1) Saint Francis (PA); Quarterfinals	L 63–67	10–20	DeGol Arena (907); Loretto, PA
*Non-conference game. ^{#}Rankings from AP Poll. (#) Tournament seedings in parentheses. All times are in Eastern Time.
