= 2018–19 LIU Brooklyn Blackbirds men's basketball team =

American college basketball season

2018–19 LIU Brooklyn Blackbirds men's basketball
- Conference: Northeast Conference
- Record: 16–16 (9–9 NEC)
- Head coach: Derek Kellogg (2nd season)
- Assistant coaches: Jim Mack (4th season); Marlon Williamson (2nd season); Ralph Auriantal (2nd season)
- Home arena: Steinberg Wellness Center; Barclays Center

2018–19 Northeast Conference men's basketball standings
	Conf.				Overall
Team	W		L	PCT	W		L	PCT
Saint Francis (PA)	12	–	6	.667	18	–	15	.545
Fairleigh Dickinson †	12	–	6	.667	21	–	14	.600
Sacred Heart	11	–	7	.611	15	–	17	.469
Robert Morris	11	–	7	.611	18	–	17	.514
St. Francis Brooklyn	9	–	9	.500	17	–	16	.515
LIU Brooklyn	9	–	9	.500	16	–	16	.500
Wagner	8	–	10	.444	13	–	17	.433
Bryant	7	–	11	.389	10	–	20	.333
Mount St. Mary's	6	–	12	.333	9	–	22	.290
Central Connecticut	5	–	13	.278	11	–	20	.355
† 2019 NEC tournament winner

The 2018–19 LIU Brooklyn Blackbirds men's basketball team represented LIU Brooklyn during the 2018–19 NCAA Division I men's basketball season. The Blackbirds were led by second-year head coach Derek Kellogg, and played their home games at the Steinberg Wellness Center, with two home games at the Barclays Center, as members of the Northeast Conference (NEC). They finished the season 16–16 overall, 9–9 in NEC play to finish in a tie for fifth place. As the No. 6 seed in the NEC tournament, they advanced to the semifinals, where they were defeated by Saint Francis (PA).

The season was the final season for the LIU Brooklyn athletic program as a distinct entity, and also the last for the "Blackbirds" nickname. Long Island University merged its two athletic programs—the Division I LIU Brooklyn Blackbirds and Division II LIU Post Pioneers—into a single Division I athletic program that has since competed as the LIU Sharks. The unified LIU program maintained LIU Brooklyn's NEC membership. The Brooklyn campus will be home to the unified basketball program.

== Previous season ==
The Blackbirds finished the 2017–18 season at 18–17, 10–8 in NEC play to finish in a tie for fourth place. As the No. 4 seed in the NEC tournament, they defeated St. Francis Brooklyn, Fairleigh Dickinson, and Wagner to become NEC Tournament champions. They earned the NEC's automatic bid to the NCAA tournament where they lost in the First Four to Radford.

== Roster ==
2018–19 Long Island Blackbirds men's basketball team
Players
Coaches

Pos.	#	Name	Height	Weight	Year	Hometown
G	0	Virshon Cotton	6 ft 2 in (1.88 m)	165 lb (75 kg)	So	Milwaukee, WI
G	1	Julian Batts	6 ft 0 in (1.83 m)	175 lb (79 kg)	Jr	Pittsburgh, Pennsylvania
G/F	2	Julious van Sauers	6 ft 8 in (2.03 m)	210 lb (95 kg)	RS Jr	Amsterdam, Netherlands
G	3	Jashaun Agosto	6 ft 0 in (1.83 m)	165 lb (75 kg)	Jr	Seattle, Washington
G	5	Shyheim Hicks	6 ft 1 in (1.85 m)	186 lb (84 kg)	So	Brockton, Massachusetts
G	10	Craig Owens Jr.	6 ft 3 in (1.91 m)	210 lb (95 kg)	Sr	Louisville, Kentucky
F	11	Eral Penn	6 ft 7 in (2.01 m)	185 lb (84 kg)	So	Brooklyn, NY
C	21	Ousmane Ndim	7 ft 0 in (2.13 m)	235 lb (107 kg)	Fr	Dakar, Senegal
G	22	Raul Frias	6 ft 1 in (1.85 m)	165 lb (75 kg)	Sr	Miami, Florida
G/F	23	Raiquan Clark	6 ft 6 in (1.98 m)	195 lb (88 kg)	Sr	New Haven, Connecticut
F	24	Ty Flowers	6 ft 9 in (2.06 m)	200 lb (91 kg)	RS So	Waterbury, Connecticut
G	30	Ashtyn Bradley	6 ft 4 in (1.93 m)	185 lb (84 kg)	Jr	Fresno, Texas

Head coach

- Derek Kellogg (UMass)

Assistant coach(es)

- Jim Mack (Springfield)
- Marlon Williamson (Youngstown State)
- Ralph Auriantal (St. Francis Brooklyn)

Legend

- (C) Team captain
- (S) Suspended
- (I) Ineligible
- (W) Walk-on
- Injured
- Current redshirt

Roster
Last update: 2019-1-18

== Schedule and results ==
Date time, TV	Rank^{#}	Opponent^{#}	Result	Record	Site (attendance) city, state
Non-conference regular season
November 6, 2018*; 7:00 pm		New Rochelle	W 109–76	1–0	Steinberg Wellness Center; Brooklyn, NY
November 9, 2018*; 7:30 pm		Brown	W 83–81	2–0	Steinberg Wellness Center (452); Brooklyn, NY
November 13, 2018*; 7:30 pm, ESPN+		at Fairfield	W 89–87	3–0	Webster Bank Arena (1,017); Bridgeport, CT
November 18, 2018*; 8:00 pm		at San Francisco; Basketball Hall of Fame Belfast Classic campus game	L 52–84	3–1	The Kelp Bed (289); Seaside, CA
November 20, 2018*; 8:00 pm, ESPN3		at Milwaukee; Basketball Hall of Fame Belfast Classic campus game	L 87–92 ^{OT}	3–2	UW–Milwaukee Panther Arena (895); Milwaukee, WI
November 24, 2018*; 2:30 pm		NJIT	L 70–77	3–3	Steinberg Wellness Center (397); Brooklyn, NY
November 29, 2018*; 2:00 pm, CBSSN		vs. Albany; Basketball Hall of Fame Belfast Classic Samson semifinals	W 80–77	4–3	SSE Arena (3,166); Belfast, Northern Ireland
November 30, 2018*; 2:30 pm, CBSSN		vs. Marist; Basketball Hall of Fame Belfast Classic Samson championship	L 53–70	4–4	SSE Arena (6,460); Belfast, Northern Ireland
December 8, 2018*; 1:00 pm		at Saint Peter's	W 74–56	5–4	Yanitelli Center (586); Jersey City, New Jersey
December 12, 2018*; 7:00 pm		at Stony Brook	L 79–83	5–5	Island Federal Credit Union Arena (2,475); Stony Brook, NY
December 21, 2018*; 12:00 pm		Binghamton	L 67–68	5–6	Barclays Center (721); Brooklyn, NY
December 30, 2018*; 6:00 pm, ESPN+		at Fordham	W 60–57	6–6	Rose Hill Gymnasium (1,538); Bronx, NY
Northeast Conference regular season
January 3, 2019; 6:00 pm		at Sacred Heart	L 75–79	6–7 (0–1)	William H. Pitt Center (384); Fairfield, CT
January 5, 2019; 4:00 pm		at Bryant	W 79–70	7–7 (1–1)	Chace Athletic Center (1,184); Smithfield, RI
January 10, 2019; 7:00 pm		Saint Francis (PA)	L 67–74	7–8 (1–2)	Steinberg Wellness Center (437); Brooklyn, NY
January 12, 2019; 4:30 pm		Robert Morris	W 80–73	8–8 (2–2)	Steinberg Wellness Center (572); Brooklyn, NY
January 19, 2019; 4:30 pm		Fairleigh Dickinson	W 79–77	9–8 (3–2)	Steinberg Wellness Center (492); Brooklyn, NY
January 21, 2019; 3:00 pm, ESPN3		St. Francis Brooklyn	L 70–79	9–9 (3–3)	Steinberg Wellness Center (758); Brooklyn, NY
January 24, 2019; 7:00 pm		at Mount St. Mary's	L 72–74	9–10 (3–4)	Knott Arena (1,832); Emmitsburg, MD
January 26, 2019; 1:00 pm		at Central Connecticut	W 84–71	10–10 (4–4)	William H. Detrick Gymnasium (764); New Britain, CT
January 31, 2019; 5:00 pm, ESPNU		at Fairleigh Dickinson	L 77–80	10–11 (4–5)	Rothman Center (990); Hackensack, NJ
February 2, 2019; 4:00 pm		at Wagner	L 59–71	10–12 (4–6)	Spiro Sports Center (1,918); Staten Island, NY
February 7, 2019; 7:00 pm		Mount St. Mary's	W 77–62	11–12 (5–6)	Barclays Center (1,934); Brooklyn, NY
February 9, 2019; 4:30 pm		Wagner	L 65–68	11–13 (5–7)	Steinberg Wellness Center (672); Brooklyn, NY
February 14, 2019; 7:00 pm		at St. Francis Brooklyn; Battle of Brooklyn	L 76–83	11–14 (5–8)	Generoso Pope Athletic Complex (672); Brooklyn, NY
February 16, 2019; 2:00 pm		Sacred Heart	W 92–84	12–14 (6–8)	Steinberg Wellness Center (597); Brooklyn, NY
February 21, 2019; 7:00 pm		at Robert Morris	L 49–62	12–15 (6–9)	North Athletic Complex (1,016); Pittsburgh, PA
February 23, 2019; 1:00 pm		at Saint Francis (PA)	W 69–66	13–15 (7–9)	DeGol Arena (1,218); Loretto, PA
February 28, 2019; 7:00 pm		Central Connecticut	W 84–55	14–15 (8–9)	Steinberg Wellness Center (621); Brooklyn, NY
March 2, 2019; 4:30 pm		Bryant	W 81–65	15–15 (9–9)	Steinberg Wellness Center (721); Brooklyn, NY
NEC tournament
March 6, 2019; 6:00 pm	(6)	at (3) Sacred Heart; Quarterfinals	W 71–62	16–15	William H. Pitt Center (494); Fairfield, CT
March 9, 2019; 12:00 pm	(6)	at (1) St. Francis (PA); Semifinals	L 64–72	16–16	DeGol Arena; Loretto, PA
*Non-conference game. ^{#}Rankings from AP Poll. (#) Tournament seedings in parentheses. All times are in Eastern Time.

Schedule source:
