= 2018–19 Central Connecticut Blue Devils men's basketball team =

American college basketball season

2018–19 Central Connecticut Blue Devils men's basketball
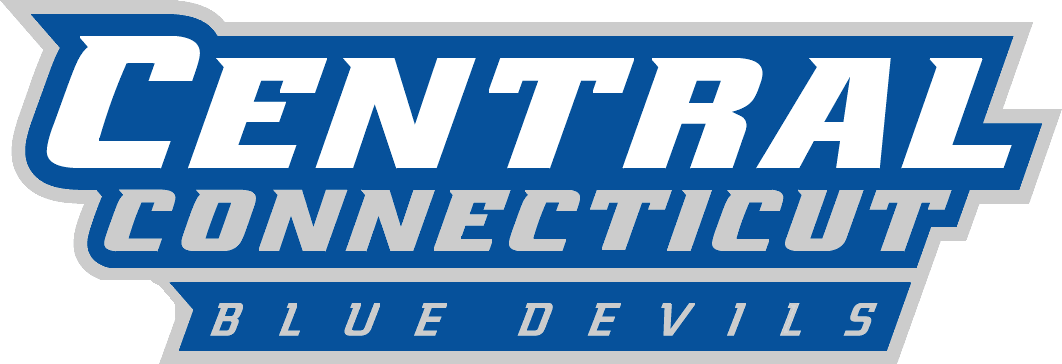
- Conference: Northeast Conference
- Record: 11–20 (5–13 NEC)
- Head coach: Donyell Marshall (3rd season)
- Assistant coaches: Mike Witcoskie; Anthony Ross; Baba Diallo
- Home arena: William H. Detrick Gymnasium

2018–19 Northeast Conference men's basketball standings
	Conf.				Overall
Team	W		L	PCT	W		L	PCT
Saint Francis (PA)	12	–	6	.667	18	–	15	.545
Fairleigh Dickinson †	12	–	6	.667	21	–	14	.600
Sacred Heart	11	–	7	.611	15	–	17	.469
Robert Morris	11	–	7	.611	18	–	17	.514
St. Francis Brooklyn	9	–	9	.500	17	–	16	.515
LIU Brooklyn	9	–	9	.500	16	–	16	.500
Wagner	8	–	10	.444	13	–	17	.433
Bryant	7	–	11	.389	10	–	20	.333
Mount St. Mary's	6	–	12	.333	9	–	22	.290
Central Connecticut	5	–	13	.278	11	–	20	.355
† 2019 NEC tournament winner

The 2018–19 Central Connecticut Blue Devils men's basketball team represented Central Connecticut State University during the 2018–19 NCAA Division I men's basketball season. The Blue Devils were led by third-year head coach Donyell Marshall, and played their home games at the William H. Detrick Gymnasium in New Britain, Connecticut as members of the Northeast Conference. They finished the season 11–20 overall, 5–13 in NEC play to finish in last place. They failed to qualify for the NEC tournament.

== Previous season ==
The Blue Devils finished the 2017–18 season, 14–18, 7–11 in NEC play to finish in eight place. They lost in the first round of the NEC tournament to Wagner.

== Roster ==
2018–19 Central Connecticut Blue Devils men's basketball team
Players
Coaches

Pos.	#	Name	Height	Weight	Year	Previous school	Hometown
F/C	0	Harrison Kay	6 ft 11 in (2.11 m)	240 lb (109 kg)	Jr	Bishop Amat	Covina Hills, CA
G/F	1	Tyler Kohl	6 ft 5 in (1.96 m)	220 lb (100 kg)	Sr	Mineral Area College	Allentown, PA
F	2	Kashaun Hicks	6 ft 6 in (1.98 m)	225 lb (102 kg)	So	The MacDuffie School	Jersey City, NJ
G	3	Ian Krishnan	6 ft 2 in (1.88 m)	180 lb (82 kg)	Fr	Proctor Academy	Boyds, MD
G/F	5	Chris Williams	6 ft 6 in (1.98 m)	180 lb (82 kg)	Jr	St. Rita	Chicago, IL
G	10	Will Ellis	6 ft 2 in (1.88 m)	175 lb (79 kg)	Fr	Cheshire Academy	Valley Stream, NY
G	11	Thai Segwai	6 ft 2 in (1.88 m)	185 lb (84 kg)	Fr	City of London Academy	London, England
G	13	Tyson Batiste	6 ft 2 in (1.88 m)	185 lb (84 kg)	Jr	Notre Dame Prep	Springfield, MO
C	14	Deion Bute	6 ft 9 in (2.06 m)	220 lb (100 kg)	Sr	Tallahassee CC	Philipsburg, Sint Maarten
G/F	15	Jamir Coleman	6 ft 7 in (2.01 m)	215 lb (98 kg)	Jr	South Plains College	San Antonio, TX
F	21	Joe Hugley	6 ft 7 in (2.01 m)	215 lb (98 kg)	Jr	Baltimore City CC	Gaithersburg, MD
F	23	Karrington Wallace	6 ft 7 in (2.01 m)	200 lb (91 kg)	Fr	Archbishop Wood	Philadelphia, PA
G/F	24	Michael Underwood	6 ft 6 in (1.98 m)	200 lb (91 kg)	Fr	Southwest	Fort Worth, TX
F	30	Donyell Jr. Marshall	6 ft 6 in (1.98 m)	175 lb (79 kg)	Jr	Orange	Pepper Pike, OH
G	55	Tyler Rowe	5 ft 9 in (1.75 m)	160 lb (73 kg)	Jr	Western Connecticut State	East Hartford, CT

Head coach

- Donyell Marshall (Connecticut)

Assistant coach(es)

- Mike Witcoskie (Susquehanna)
- Anthony Ross (East Stroudsburg)
- Baba Diallo (Baker)

Legend

- (C) Team captain
- (S) Suspended
- (I) Ineligible
- (W) Walk-on
- Injured
- Current redshirt

Roster
Last update: January 19, 2019

== Schedule and results ==
Date time, TV	Opponent	Result	Record	Site (attendance) city, state
Exhibition
October 27, 2018*; 7:00 pm	Arcadia	W 79–72		William H. Detrick Gymnasium; New Britain, CT
Non-conference regular season
November 6, 2018*; 7:00 pm, ESPN3	at Hartford; Rivalry	W 75–68	1–0	Chase Arena at Reich Family Pavilion (1,269); West Hartford, CT
November 10, 2018*; 6:00 pm, FS2	at Georgetown	L 78–85	1–1	Capital One Arena (5,270); Washington, D.C.
November 13, 2018*; 7:00 pm	UMass Lowell	W 86–74	2–1	William H. Detrick Gymnasium (1,024); New Britain, CT
November 16, 2018*; 11:30 am	vs. Austin Peay; Jamaica Classic	L 78–80	2–2	Montego Bay Convention Centre; Montego Bay, Jamaica
November 18, 2018*; 9:15 pm	vs. Florida A&M; Jamaica Classic	W 89–75	3–2	Montego Bay Convention Centre (1,425); Montego Bay, Jamaica
November 21, 2018*; 10:00 pm	at Loyola Marymount	L 74–76	3–3	Gersten Pavilion (644); Los Angeles, CA
November 25, 2018*; 4:00 pm	Pine Manor	W 88–59	4–3	William H. Detrick Gymnasium (851); New Britain, CT
November 29, 2018*; 7:30 pm	at North Carolina A&T	L 60–72	4–4	Corbett Sports Center (1,909); Greensboro, NC
December 1, 2018*; 1:00 pm, ACCN Extra	at No. 13 Virginia Tech	L 40–94	4–5	Cassell Coliseum (9,275); Blacksburg, VA
December 8, 2018*; 1:00 pm	Penn State Wilkes-Barre	W 79–58	5–5	William H. Detrick Gymnasium (921); New Britain, CT
December 16, 2018*; 2:00 pm, FS1	at Providence	L 63–87	5–6	Dunkin' Donuts Center (6,876); Providence, RI
December 22, 2018*; 1:00 pm	at Maine	W 93–90 ^{2OT}	6–6	Cross Insurance Center (1,084); Bangor, ME
December 29, 2018*; 8:00 pm, P12N	at Oregon State	L 59–80	6–7	Gill Coliseum (4,210); Corvallis, OR
NEC regular season
January 3, 2019; 7:00 pm	Wagner	L 58–80	6–8 (0–1)	William H. Detrick Gymnasium (812); New Britain, CT
January 5, 2019; 3:30 pm	at Sacred Heart	L 61–73	6–9 (0–2)	William H. Pitt Center (553); Fairfield, CT
January 10, 2019; 7:00 pm	at Fairleigh Dickinson	W 103–96 ^{2OT}	7–9 (1–2)	Rothman Center (327); Hackensack, NJ
January 12, 2019; 4:00 pm	at Mount St. Mary's	W 77–68	8–9 (2–2)	Knott Arena (1,336); Emmitsburg, MD
January 19, 2019; 3:30 pm	Saint Francis (PA)	L 69–80	8–10 (2–3)	William H. Detrick Gymnasium (1,007); New Britain, CT
January 21, 2019; 3:30 pm	Robert Morris	L 59–70	8–11 (2–4)	William H. Detrick Gymnasium (985); New Britain, CT
January 24, 2019; 7:00 pm	at Bryant	L 60–63	8–12 (2–5)	Chace Athletic Center (891); Smithfield, RI
January 26, 2019; 1:00 pm	LIU Brooklyn	L 71–84	8–13 (2–6)	William H. Detrick Gymnasium (764); New Britain, CT
January 31, 2019; 7:00 pm	St. Francis Brooklyn	W 78–72	9–13 (3–6)	William H. Detrick Gymnasium (894); New Britain, CT
February 2, 2019; 3:30 pm	Bryant	W 64–59	10–13 (4–6)	William H. Detrick Gymnasium; New Britain, CT
February 7, 2019; 5:00 pm, ESPNU	at Saint Francis (PA)	L 85–90	10–14 (4–7)	DeGol Arena (841); Loretto, PA
February 9, 2019; 4:00 pm, ESPN+	at Robert Morris	W 77–68	11–14 (5–7)	North Athletic Complex (1,016); Pittsburgh, PA
February 14, 2019; 7:00 pm	at Wagner	L 57–63	11–15 (5–8)	Spiro Sports Center (1,150); Staten Island, NY
February 16, 2019; 4:00 pm	at St. Francis Brooklyn	L 79–90	11–16 (5–9)	Generoso Pope Athletic Complex (631); Brooklyn, NY
February 21, 2019; 7:00 pm	Mount St. Mary's	L 66–79	11–17 (5–10)	William H. Detrick Gymnasium (1,020); New Britain, CT
February 23, 2019; 3:30 pm	Sacred Heart	L 66–80	11–18 (5–11)	William H. Detrick Gymnasium (1,254); New Britain, CT
February 28, 2019; 7:00 pm	at LIU Brooklyn	L 55–84	11–19 (5–12)	Steinberg Wellness Center (621); Brooklyn, NY
March 2, 2019; 1:00 pm	Fairleigh Dickinson	L 58–70	11–20 (5–13)	William H. Detrick Gymnasium (1,114); New Britain, CT
*Non-conference game. ^{#}Rankings from AP Poll. (#) Tournament seedings in parentheses. All times are in Eastern.
