= 2018–19 Saint Francis Red Flash men's basketball team =

American college basketball season

2018–19 Saint Francis Red Flash men's basketball

NEC regular-season co-champions

NIT, first round
- Conference: Northeast Conference
- Record: 18–15 (12–6 NEC)
- Head coach: Rob Krimmel (7th season)
- Associate head coach: Andrew Helton
- Assistant coaches: Eric Taylor; Umar Shannon
- Home arena: DeGol Arena

2018–19 Northeast Conference men's basketball standings
	Conf.				Overall
Team	W		L	PCT	W		L	PCT
Saint Francis (PA)	12	–	6	.667	18	–	15	.545
Fairleigh Dickinson †	12	–	6	.667	21	–	14	.600
Sacred Heart	11	–	7	.611	15	–	17	.469
Robert Morris	11	–	7	.611	18	–	17	.514
St. Francis Brooklyn	9	–	9	.500	17	–	16	.515
LIU Brooklyn	9	–	9	.500	16	–	16	.500
Wagner	8	–	10	.444	13	–	17	.433
Bryant	7	–	11	.389	10	–	20	.333
Mount St. Mary's	6	–	12	.333	9	–	22	.290
Central Connecticut	5	–	13	.278	11	–	20	.355
† 2019 NEC tournament winner

The 2018–19 Saint Francis Red Flash men's basketball team represented Saint Francis University during the 2018–19 NCAA Division I men's basketball season. The Red Flash, were led by seventh-year head coach Rob Krimmel, played their home games at DeGol Arena in Loretto, Pennsylvania as members of the Northeast Conference (NEC).

The Red Flash finished the season at 18–15, 12–6 in NEC play, to finish in a tie for first place. Due to tie-breakers, they were the 1 seed in the 2019 Northeast Conference men's basketball tournament. The Red Flash defeated Bryant in the quarterfinals and LIU Brooklyn in the semifinals, yet lost in the championship game to Fairleigh Dickinson. As regular-season co-champions they received an NIT bid. Saint Francis lost to 1 seed Indiana in the first round.

== Previous season ==
The Red Flash finished the 2016–17 season at 18–13, 12–6 in NEC play, to finish in a tie for second place. They lost in the quarterfinals of the NEC tournament to Fairleigh Dickinson. They were invited to the CollegeInsider.com Tournament where they lost in the first round to UIC.

== Roster ==
2018–19 Saint Francis Red Flash men's basketball team
Players
Coaches

Pos.	#	Name	Height	Weight	Year	Previous school	Hometown
G	0	Markus Vallien	5 ft 10 in (1.78 m)	160 lb (73 kg)	So	St. Pius X HS	Houston, TX
G	1	Ramiir Dixon-Conover	6 ft 3 in (1.91 m)	185 lb (84 kg)	So	Southeastern CC	Newark, NJ
G	2	Scott Meredith (redshirt)	6 ft 2 in (1.88 m)	180 lb (82 kg)	Sr	Hargrave Military Academy	Pilot Mountain, NC
G	3	Jamaal King	5 ft 10 in (1.78 m)	170 lb (77 kg)	Sr	Bishop O'Connell HS	Salisbury, MD
G	4	Randall Jr. Gaskins	6 ft 3 in (1.91 m)	180 lb (82 kg)	Jr	Bishop O'Connell HS	Woodbridge, VA
F	5	Myles Thompson	6 ft 6 in (1.98 m)	230 lb (104 kg)	Fr	Camden HS	Camden, NJ
G	11	Isaiah Blackmon	6 ft 1 in (1.85 m)	170 lb (77 kg)	RS Jr	West Charlotte HS	Charlotte, NC
G	13	Keith Braxton	6 ft 5 in (1.96 m)	208 lb (94 kg)	Jr	Lawrenceville School	Glassboro, NJ
G	14	Andre Wolford	6 ft 2 in (1.88 m)	175 lb (79 kg)	Sr	Saint Ignatius HS	North Olmsted, OH
F	15	Precious Ikediashi (redshirt)	6 ft 8 in (2.03 m)	215 lb (98 kg)	Fr	Hudson Catholic HS	Hoboken, NJ
G	20	Dan Henry	5 ft 11 in (1.8 m)	160 lb (73 kg)	So	Hamburg HS	Hamburg, NY
G	22	Michael Klebon	6 ft 2 in (1.88 m)	175 lb (79 kg)	Sr	Southern Columbia Area HS	Paxinos, PA
G	23	A. J. Labriola (W)	6 ft 2 in (1.88 m)	175 lb (79 kg)	Fr	Bishop Guilfoyle HS	Altoona, PA
G	24	Jordan Forehand	6 ft 0 in (1.83 m)	180 lb (82 kg)	Sr	IMG Academy	Bridgewater, NJ
F/C	30	Deivydas Kuzavas	6 ft 10 in (2.08 m)	210 lb (95 kg)	Jr	St. Mary's Ryken HS	Kretinga, Lithuania
G	31	Bryce Laskey (redshirt)	6 ft 4 in (1.93 m)	190 lb (86 kg)	Fr	Laurel Highlands HS	Uniontown, PA
F/C	33	Luidgy Laporal	6 ft 9 in (2.06 m)	240 lb (109 kg)	Sr	Harcum College	Petit-Bourg, France
F	42	Mark Flagg	6 ft 9 in (2.06 m)	195 lb (88 kg)	So	Pennsbury HS	Fairless Hills, PA

Head coach

- Rob Krimmel (Saint Francis (PA))

Assistant coach(es)

- Andrew Helton (Miami (OH))
- Eric Taylor (Saint Francis (PA))
- Umar Shannon (Saint Francis (PA))

Legend

- (C) Team captain
- (S) Suspended
- (I) Ineligible
- (W) Walk-on
- Injured
- Current redshirt

Roster
Last update: November 4, 2025

== Schedule and results ==
Date time, TV	Rank^{#}	Opponent^{#}	Result	Record	Site (attendance) city, state
Non-conference regular season
November 6, 2018*; 4:00 p.m.		at Buffalo	L 67–82	0–1	Alumni Arena (1,852); Amherst, NY
November 9, 2018*; 7:00 p.m.		Morgan State	W 80–62	1–1	DeGol Arena (1,172); Loretto, PA
November 16, 2018*; 11:00 p.m., P12N		at No. 20 UCLA; Las Vegas Invitational	L 58–95	1–2	Pauley Pavilion (6,127); Los Angeles, CA
November 19, 2018*; 8:00 p.m., ACCN Extra		at No. 7 North Carolina; Las Vegas Invitational	L 76–101	1–3	Dean Smith Center (20,547); Chapel Hill, NC
November 24, 2018*; 1:00 p.m., ACCN Extra		at No. 13 Virginia Tech	L 37–74	1–4	Cassell Coliseum (7,474); Blacksburg, VA
November 27, 2018*; 6:00 p.m.		Bloomsburg	W 113–59	2–4	DeGol Arena (744); Loretto, PA
November 30, 2018*; 7:00 p.m.		Niagara	W 79–75	3–4	DeGol Arena (992); Loretto, PA
December 4, 2018*; 7:00 p.m., NBCSWA		at American	L 82–95	3–5	Bender Arena (745); Washington, D.C.
December 9, 2018*; 2:00 p.m.		at Delaware	L 83–88	3–6	Bob Carpenter Center (1,933); Newark, DE
December 18, 2018*; 7:00 p.m.		Franciscan	W 96–63	4–6	DeGol Arena (558); Loretto, PA
December 22, 2018*; 12:00 p.m.		at Lehigh	L 76–88	4–7	Stabler Arena (811); Bethlehem, PA
NEC regular season
January 3, 2019; 7:00 p.m.		Mount St. Mary's	W 80–69	5–7 (1–0)	DeGol Arena (598); Loretto, PA
January 5, 2019; 7:00 p.m.		Fairleigh Dickinson	L 61–79	5–8 (1–1)	DeGol Arena (704); Loretto, PA
January 10, 2019; 7:00 p.m.		at LIU Brooklyn	W 74–67	6–8 (2–1)	Steinberg Wellness Center (437); Brooklyn, NY
January 12, 2019; 4:00 p.m.		at St. Francis Brooklyn	L 68–72	6–9 (2–2)	Generoso Pope Athletic Complex (413); Brooklyn, NY
January 19, 2019; 3:30 p.m.		at Central Connecticut	W 80–69	7–9 (3–2)	William H. Detrick Gymnasium (1,007); New Britain, CT
January 21, 2019; 5:00 p.m.		at Bryant	L 67–76	7–10 (3–3)	Chace Athletic Center (443); Smithfield, RI
January 24, 2019; 7:00 p.m.		Wagner	L 79–83	7–11 (3–4)	DeGol Arena (767); Loretto, PA
January 26, 2019; 7:00 p.m.		Sacred Heart	W 79–78	8–11 (4–4)	DeGol Arena (1,344); Loretto, PA
January 31, 2019; 7:00 p.m.		at Robert Morris	W 76–73	9–12 (5–4)	UPMC Events Center (1,016); Moon Township, PA
February 2, 2019; 4:00 p.m., ESPN3		at Mount St. Mary's	W 72–63	10–44 (6–4)	Knott Arena (3,121); Emmitsburg, MD
February 7, 2019; 5:00 p.m., ESPNU		Central Connecticut	W 90–85	11–11 (7–4)	DeGol Arena (841); Loretto, PA
February 9, 2019; 7:00 p.m.		Bryant	W 84–75	12–11 (8–4)	DeGol Arena (1,459); Loretto, PA
February 14, 2019; 6:00 p.m., CBSSN		at Fairleigh Dickinson	W 87–62	13–11 (9–4)	Rothman Center; Hackensack, NJ
February 16, 2019; 7:00 p.m.		Robert Morris	W 72–69	14–11 (10–4)	DeGol Arena (1,828); Loretto, PA
February 21, 2019; 7:00 p.m.		St. Francis Brooklyn	W 81–71	15–11 (11–4)	DeGol Arena (1,030); Loretto, PA
February 23, 2019; 1:00 p.m.		LIU Brooklyn	L 66–69	15–12 (11–5)	DeGol Arena (1,218); Loretto, PA
February 28, 2019; 7:00 p.m.		at Wagner	W 83–72	16–12 (12–5)	Spiro Sports Center (1,848); Staten Island, NY
March 2, 2019; 3:30 p.m.		at Sacred Heart	L 84–94	16–13 (12–6)	William H. Pitt Center (507); Fairfield, CT
NEC tournament
March 6, 2019; 7:00 p.m., NEC Front Row	(1)	(8) Bryant; Quarterfinals	W 67-63	17-13	DeGol Arena (907); Loretto, PA
March 9, 2019; 12:00 p.m., ESPN3	(1)	(6) LIU Brooklyn; Semifinals	W 72–64	18–13	DeGol Arena (1,204); Loretto, PA
March 12, 2019; 7:00 p.m., ESPN2	(1)	(2) Fairleigh Dickinson; Championship	L 76–85	18–14	DeGol Arena; Loretto, PA
NIT
March 19, 2019*; 7:00 p.m., ESPN	(8)	at (1) Indiana; First round – Indiana bracket	L 72–89	18–15	Simon Skjodt Assembly Hall (5,431); Bloomington, IN
*Non-conference game. ^{#}Rankings from AP poll. (#) Tournament seedings in parentheses. All times are in Eastern.
