= 2018–19 Wagner Seahawks men's basketball team =

American college basketball season

2018–19 Wagner Seahawks men's basketball
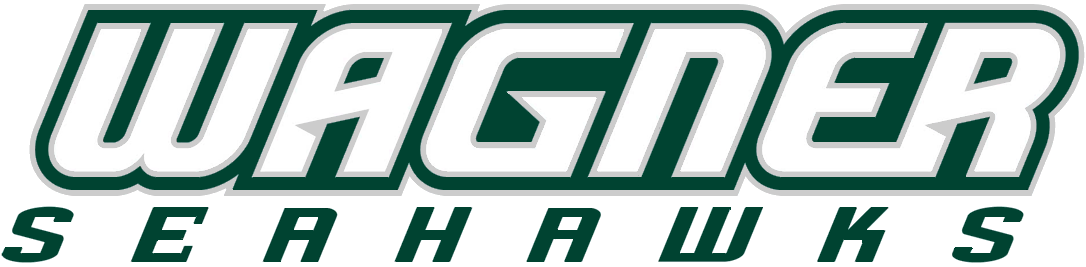
- Conference: Northeast Conference
- Record: 13–17 (8–10 NEC)
- Head coach: Bashir Mason (7th season)
- Assistant coaches: Mike Babul; Donald Copeland; Winston Smith
- Home arena: Spiro Sports Center

2018–19 Northeast Conference men's basketball standings
	Conf.				Overall
Team	W		L	PCT	W		L	PCT
Saint Francis (PA)	12	–	6	.667	18	–	15	.545
Fairleigh Dickinson †	12	–	6	.667	21	–	14	.600
Sacred Heart	11	–	7	.611	15	–	17	.469
Robert Morris	11	–	7	.611	18	–	17	.514
St. Francis Brooklyn	9	–	9	.500	17	–	16	.515
LIU Brooklyn	9	–	9	.500	16	–	16	.500
Wagner	8	–	10	.444	13	–	17	.433
Bryant	7	–	11	.389	10	–	20	.333
Mount St. Mary's	6	–	12	.333	9	–	22	.290
Central Connecticut	5	–	13	.278	11	–	20	.355
† 2019 NEC tournament winner

The 2018–19 Wagner Seahawks men's basketball team represented Wagner College during the 2018–19 NCAA Division I men's basketball season. The Seahawks were led by seventh-year head coach Bashir Mason. They played their home games at Spiro Sports Center on the school's Staten Island campus as members of the Northeast Conference. They finished the season 13–17 overall, 8–10 in NEC play to finish in seventh place. As the No. 7 seed in the NEC tournament, they were defeated in the quarterfinals by the eventual tournament champion, Fairleigh Dickinson.

== Previous season ==
The Seahawks finished the 2017–18 season, 23–10, 14–4 in NEC play to win the NEC regular season championship. In the NEC tournament, they defeated Central Connecticut and Robert Morris before losing to LIU Brooklyn in the championship game. As a regular season conference champion who did not win their conference tournament, they received an invitation to the National Invitation Tournament, where they lost in the first round to Baylor.

== Roster ==
2018–19 Wagner Seahawks men's basketball team
Players
Coaches

Pos.	#	Name	Height	Weight	Year	Previous school	Hometown
F	0	Nigel Jackson	6 ft 7 in (2.01 m)	215 lb (98 kg)	So	Mount Saint Joseph	Baltimore, MD
F	1	Lonnie Rivera	6 ft 6 in (1.98 m)	195 lb (88 kg)	Jr	American	Spring Valley, NY
G	2	Tyler Plummer	6 ft 3 in (1.91 m)	200 lb (91 kg)	So	Athlete Institute Prep	Vaughan, ON
G	3	Jonathan Norfleet	6 ft 1 in (1.85 m)	165 lb (75 kg)	Fr	Salem	Virginia Beach, VA
F	4	AJ Sumbry	6 ft 8 in (2.03 m)	230 lb (104 kg)	RS Sr	Quinnipiac	East Windsor, NJ
F	5	Chance Anderson	6 ft 7 in (2.01 m)	215 lb (98 kg)	Jr	Columbia State CC; San Francisco	Alpharetta, GA
G/F	10	Tim Graham	6 ft 6 in (1.98 m)	190 lb (86 kg)	Jr	Northwest Kansas Technical College	Portland, OR
G	11	Romone Saunders	6 ft 3 in (1.91 m)	210 lb (95 kg)	RS Sr	Mt. Zion Prep	Temple Hills, MD
G	12	Chase Freeman	5 ft 11 in (1.8 m)	165 lb (75 kg)	So	Station Camp	Gallatin, TN
G	13	Tyrone Nesby IV	6 ft 5 in (1.96 m)	180 lb (82 kg)	Fr	Scotland Campus Prep	Reading, PA
G/F	21	Elijah Davis	6 ft 4 in (1.93 m)	215 lb (98 kg)	Sr	Odessa College	Bronx, NY
G	22	Jeff Coulanges	6 ft 3 in (1.91 m)	190 lb (86 kg)	Jr	Daytona State College	Trenton, NJ
G	24	Devin Liggeons	6 ft 3 in (1.91 m)	190 lb (86 kg)	Sr	Imhotep Charter	Philadelphia, PA

Head coach

- Bashir Mason (Drexel)

Assistant coach(es)

- Mike Babul (Massachusetts)
- Donald Copeland (Seton Hall)
- Winston Smith (Massachusetts)

Legend

- (C) Team captain
- (S) Suspended
- (I) Ineligible
- (W) Walk-on
- Injured
- Current redshirt

Roster
Last update: January 14, 2019

== Schedule and results ==
Date time, TV	Rank^{#}	Opponent^{#}	Result	Record	Site (attendance) city, state
Non-conference regular season
November 6, 2018*; 6:30 pm, FS2		at Seton Hall	L 49–89	0–1	Walsh Gymnasium (1,655); South Orange, NJ
November 10, 2018*; 1:00 pm, ESPN3		at UMass Lowell	L 84–88 ^{OT}	0–2	Costello Athletic Center (1,078); Lowell, MA
November 13, 2018*; 7:00 pm		SUNY Cortland	W 90–58	1–2	Spiro Sports Center (1,386); Staten Island, NY
November 17, 2018*; 1:00 pm, ESPN3		at Fairfield	W 79–73	2–2	Webster Bank Arena; Bridgeport, NY
November 20, 2018*; 7:00 pm, ESPN3		NJIT	L 60–71	2–3	Spiro Sports Center (1,278); Staten Island, NY
November 24, 2018*; 2:00 pm		Rider	L 65–89	2–4	Spiro Sports Center (1,147); Staten Island, NY
November 30, 2018*; 7:00 pm		at American	W 64–58	3–4	Bender Arena (730); Washington, D.C.
December 9, 2018*; 2:00 pm		College of New Rochelle	W 105–57	4–4	Spiro Sports Center (1,003); Staten Island, NY
December 16, 2018*; 4:30 pm, FS1		at St. John's	L 58–73	4–5	Carnesecca Arena (5,602); Queens, NY
December 22, 2018*; 2:00 pm		Hartford	W 77–68	5–5	Spiro Sports Center (1,216); Staten Island, NY
December 29, 2018*; 2:00 pm		at Saint Joseph's	L 57–59	5–6	Hagan Arena (3,295); Philadelphia, PA
NEC regular season
January 3, 2019; 7:00 pm		at Central Connecticut	W 80–58	6–6 (1–0)	William H. Detrick Gymnasium (812); New Britain, CT
January 5, 2019; 4:00 pm		St. Francis Brooklyn	L 59–66	6–7 (1–1)	Spiro Sports Center (1,303); Staten Island, NY
January 10, 2019; 7:00 pm, ESPN3		Sacred Heart	W 76–73	7–7 (2–1)	Spiro Sports Center (1,508); Staten Island, NY
January 12, 2019; 4:00 pm		Fairleigh Dickinson	W 66–60	8–7 (3–1)	Spiro Sports Center (1,712); Staten Island, NY
January 19, 2019; 4:00 pm		Mount St. Mary's	L 56–70	8–8 (3–2)	Spiro Sports Center (1,632); Staten Island, NY
January 21, 2019; 3:30 pm		at Sacred Heart	L 38–62	8–9 (3–3)	William H. Pitt Center (707); Fairfield, CT
January 24, 2019; 7:00 pm		at Saint Francis (PA)	W 83–79	9–9 (4–3)	DeGol Arena (767); Loretto, PA
January 26, 2019; 5:00 pm		at Robert Morris	L 51–57	9–10 (4–4)	North Athletic Complex (1,016); Pittsburgh, PA
January 31, 2019; 7:00 pm, ESPN+		Bryant	L 64–71	9–11 (4–5)	Spiro Sports Center (1,637); Staten Island, NY
February 2, 2019; 4:00 pm		LIU Brooklyn	W 71–59	10–11 (5–5)	Spiro Sports Center (1,918); Staten Island, NY
February 7, 2019; 7:00 pm		at St. Francis Brooklyn	L 44–51	10–12 (5–6)	Generoso Pope Athletic Complex (478); Brooklyn, NY
February 9, 2019; 4:30 pm		at LIU Brooklyn	W 68–65	11–12 (6–6)	Steinberg Wellness Center (672); Brooklyn, NY
February 14, 2019; 7:00 pm		Central Connecticut	W 63–57	12–12 (7–6)	Spiro Sports Center (1,150); Staten Island, NY
February 16, 2019; 4:00 pm		at Mount St. Mary's	W 58–56	13–12 (8–6)	Knott Arena (2,182); Emmitsburg, MD
February 21, 2019; 7:00 pm, CBSSN		at Bryant	L 65–67	13–13 (8–7)	Chace Athletic Center (1,093); Smithfield, RI
February 23, 2019; 4:30 pm		at Fairleigh Dickinson	L 66–74	13–14 (8–8)	Rothman Center (742); Hackensack, NJ
February 28, 2019; 7:00 pm		Saint Francis (PA)	L 72–83	13–15 (8–9)	Spiro Sports Center (1,848); Staten Island, NY
March 2, 2019; 4:00 pm		Robert Morris	L 60–69	13–16 (8–10)	Spiro Sports Center (1,558); Staten Island, NY
NEC tournament
March 6, 2019; 7:00 pm, NEC Front Row	(7)	at (2) Fairleigh Dickinson; Quarterfinals	L 46–84	13–17	Rothman Center (1,190); Hackensack, NJ
*Non-conference game. ^{#}Rankings from AP Poll. (#) Tournament seedings in parentheses. All times are in Eastern.
