= 2018–19 Mount St. Mary's Mountaineers men's basketball team =

American college basketball season

2018–19 Mount St. Mary's Mountaineers men's basketball
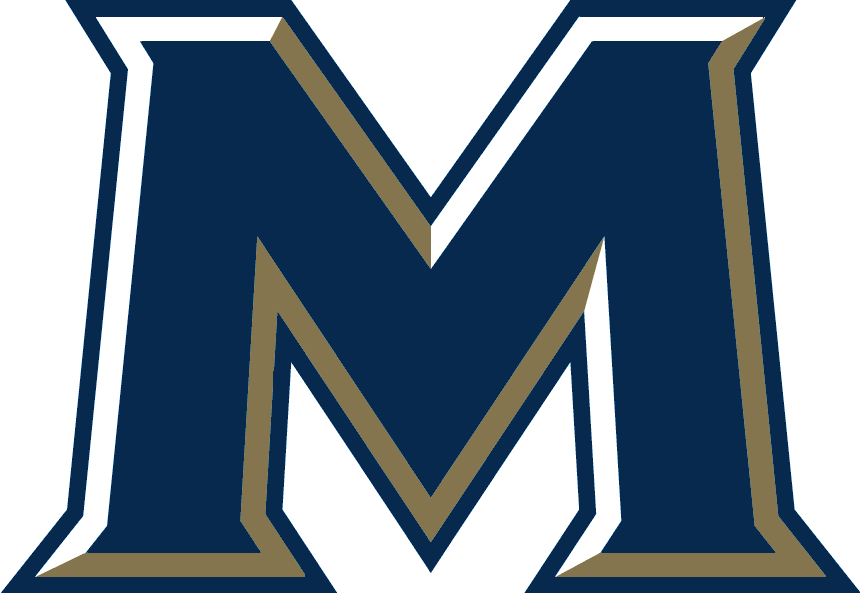
- Conference: Northeast Conference
- Record: 9–22 (6–12 NEC)
- Head coach: Dan Engelstad (1st season)
- Assistant coaches: Will Holland; Xavier Joyner; Matt Miller
- Home arena: Knott Arena

2018–19 Northeast Conference men's basketball standings
	Conf.				Overall
Team	W		L	PCT	W		L	PCT
Saint Francis (PA)	12	–	6	.667	18	–	15	.545
Fairleigh Dickinson †	12	–	6	.667	21	–	14	.600
Sacred Heart	11	–	7	.611	15	–	17	.469
Robert Morris	11	–	7	.611	18	–	17	.514
St. Francis Brooklyn	9	–	9	.500	17	–	16	.515
LIU Brooklyn	9	–	9	.500	16	–	16	.500
Wagner	8	–	10	.444	13	–	17	.433
Bryant	7	–	11	.389	10	–	20	.333
Mount St. Mary's	6	–	12	.333	9	–	22	.290
Central Connecticut	5	–	13	.278	11	–	20	.355
† 2019 NEC tournament winner

The 2018–19 Mount St. Mary's Mountaineers men's basketball team represented Mount St. Mary's University during the 2018–19 NCAA Division I men's basketball season. The Mountaineers were led by first-year head coach Dan Engelstad, and played their home games at Knott Arena in Emmitsburg, Maryland as members of the Northeast Conference (NEC). They finished the season 9–22 overall, 6–12 in NEC play, to finish in ninth place. They failed to qualify for the NEC tournament.

== Previous season ==
The Mountaineers finished the 2017–18 season, 18–14, 12–6 in NEC play, to finish in a tie for second place. As the No. 2 seed in the NEC tournament, they were upset in the quarterfinals by Robert Morris.

On May 2, 2018, former head coach Jamion Christian left the team to take the head coaching job at Siena. One week later, the school hired former Mountaineer assistant coach Dan Engelstad from Division III Southern Vermont.

== Roster ==
2018–19 Mount St. Mary's Mountaineers men's basketball team
Players
Coaches

Pos.	#	Name	Height	Weight	Year	Previous school	Hometown
G	0	Vado Morse	6 ft 0 in (1.83 m)	155 lb (70 kg)	Fr	Bullis School	Suitland, MD
G	1	Jalen Gibbs	6 ft 3 in (1.91 m)	180 lb (82 kg)	So	North Point	Indian Head, MD
G	2	Dee Barnes	6 ft 4 in (1.93 m)	180 lb (82 kg)	Fr	Great Mills	Great Mills, MD
G	3	Matt Becht	6 ft 2 in (1.88 m)	175 lb (79 kg)	Fr	Bishop O'Connell	Arlington, VA
G	4	James IV West	6 ft 1 in (1.85 m)	165 lb (75 kg)	So	Freedom	Woodbridge, VA
G	5	Damon'te Moore	5 ft 8 in (1.73 m)	173 lb (78 kg)	So	Dunbar	Baltimore, MD
F	10	Martin Poulsen	6 ft 6 in (1.98 m)	185 lb (84 kg)	Fr	Falkonergårdens Gymnasium	Furesø, Denmark
F	11	Ace Stallings	6 ft 10 in (2.08 m)	230 lb (104 kg)	So	Sidwell Friends School	Miami, FL
G	12	Odri Dedolli	6 ft 3 in (1.91 m)	177 lb (80 kg)	So	Montverde Academy	Tirana, Albania
F	13	Omar Habwe	6 ft 6 in (1.98 m)	225 lb (102 kg)	So	St. James School, Maryland	Lexington, VA
G	15	Damian Chong Qui	5 ft 8 in (1.73 m)	145 lb (66 kg)	Fr	McDonogh School	Baltimore, MD
F	21	Collin Nnamene	6 ft 8 in (2.03 m)	210 lb (95 kg)	Fr	St. Albans School	Enugu State, Nigeria
F	22	Nana Opoku	6 ft 8 in (2.03 m)	186 lb (84 kg)	RS Fr	Potomac	Woodbridge, VA
G	23	Brandon Leftwich	6 ft 4 in (1.93 m)	180 lb (82 kg)	RS So	Xaverian	Brooklyn, NY
F	34	Jalen Jefferson	6 ft 7 in (2.01 m)	190 lb (86 kg)	Fr	Hopewell	Hopewell, VA
F	42	Malik Jefferson	6 ft 9 in (2.06 m)	230 lb (104 kg)	Fr	Hopewell	Hopewell, VA

Head coach

- Dan Engelstad (St. Mary's College (MD))

Assistant coach(es)

- Will Holland (Mount St. Mary's)
- Xavier Joyner (Husson)
- Matt Miller (St. Mary's College (MD))

Legend

- (C) Team captain
- (S) Suspended
- (I) Ineligible
- (W) Walk-on
- Injured
- Current redshirt

Roster
Last update: April 6, 2024

== Schedule and results ==
Date time, TV	Opponent	Result	Record	Site (attendance) city, state
Exhibition
November 1, 2018*; 7:00 p.m.	Hood	W 87–81		Knott Arena (1,080); Emmitsburg, MD
Non-conference regular season
November 6, 2018*; 7:00 p.m., ACCN Extra	at NC State	L 55–105	0–1	PNC Arena (13,632); Raleigh, NC
November 9, 2018*; 7:30 p.m.	at Hofstra	L 61–79	0–2	Mack Sports Complex (4,645); Hempstead, NY
November 14, 2018*; 7:00 p.m., ESPN+	at Marshall	L 75–98	0–3	Cam Henderson Center (6,050); Huntington, WV
November 18, 2018*; 4:00 p.m., BTN	at Maryland	L 77–92	0–4	Xfinity Center (11,782); College Park, MD
November 21, 2018*; 5:00 p.m.	North Carolina A&T	L 60–74	0–5	Knott Arena (1,295); Emmitsburg, MD
November 25, 2018*; 1:00 p.m.	at Morgan State	L 68–78	0–6	Talmadge L. Hill Field House (372); Baltimore, MD
December 1, 2018*; 1:00 p.m., MASN	at Loyola (MD)	L 65–75	0–7	Reitz Arena (1,244); Baltimore, MD
December 5, 2018*; 6:30 p.m., FS2	at St. John's	L 71–85	0–8	Carnesecca Arena (4,928); Queens, NY
December 8, 2018*; 4:00 p.m.	Lehigh	L 78–85	0–9	Knott Arena (1,928); Emmitsburg, MD
December 15, 2018*; 4:00 p.m.	Wilson	W 74–59	1–9	Knott Arena (1,223); Emmitsburg, MD
December 18, 2018*; 7:00 p.m.	at American	W 56–55	2–9	Bender Arena (477); Washington, D.C.
December 22, 2018*; 4:00 p.m.	St. Mary's (MD)	W 83–44	3–9	Knott Arena (1,225); Emmitsburg, MD
December 30, 2018*; 3:00 p.m., ESPNU	at Minnesota	L 53–71	3–10	Williams Arena (10,767); Minneapolis, MN
NEC regular season
January 3, 2019; 7:00 p.m.	at Saint Francis (PA)	L 69–80	3–11 (0–1)	DeGol Arena (598); Loretto, PA
January 5, 2019; 5:00 p.m.	at Robert Morris	L 59–62	3–12 (0–2)	North Athletic Complex (1,016); Pittsburgh, PA
January 10, 2019; 7:00 p.m.	Bryant	L 59–66	3–13 (0–3)	Knott Arena (1,085); Emmitsburg, MD
January 12, 2019; 4:00 p.m.	Central Connecticut	L 68–77	3–14 (0–4)	Knott Arena (1,336); Emmitsburg, MD
January 19, 2019; 4:00 p.m.	at Wagner	W 70–56	4–14 (1–4)	Spiro Sports Center (1,632); Staten Island, NY
January 21, 2019; 7:00 p.m.	at Fairleigh Dickinson	L 69–87	4–15 (1–5)	Rothman Center (443); Hackensack, NJ
January 24, 2019; 7:00 p.m.	LIU Brooklyn	W 74–72	5–15 (2–5)	Knott Arena (1,832); Emmitsburg, MD
January 26, 2019; 5:00 p.m.	St. Francis Brooklyn	L 67–74	5–16 (2–6)	Knott Arena (3,011); Emmitsburg, MD
January 31, 2019; 7:00 p.m.	Sacred Heart	L 79–87	5–17 (2–7)	Knott Arena (1,621); Emmitsburg, MD
February 2, 2019; 4:00 p.m., ESPN3	Saint Francis (PA)	L 63–72	5–19 (2–8)	Knott Arena; Emmitsburg, MD
February 7, 2019; 7:00 p.m.	at LIU Brooklyn	L 62–77	5–19 (2–9)	Steinberg Wellness Center (1,934); Brooklyn, NY
February 9, 2019; 3:00 p.m., ESPN+	at Sacred Heart	W 76–73	6–19 (3–9)	William H. Pitt Center (1,082); Fairfield, CT
February 14, 2019; 7:00 p.m.	Robert Morris	W 76–62	7–19 (4–9)	Knott Arena (1,761); Emmitsburg, MD
February 16, 2019; 4:00 p.m.	Wagner	L 56–58	7–20 (4–10)	Knott Arena (2,182); Emmitsburg, MD
February 21, 2019; 7:00 p.m.	at Central Connecticut	W 79–66	8–20 (5–10)	William H. Detrick Gymnasium (1,020); New Britain, CT
February 23, 2019; 4:00 p.m.	at Bryant	L 58–81	8–21 (5–11)	Chace Athletic Center (1,171); Smithfield, RI
February 28, 2019; 7:00 p.m.	Fairleigh Dickinson	L 59–65	8–22 (5–12)	Knott Arena (2,032); Emmitsburg, MD
March 2, 2019; 4:00 p.m.	at St. Francis Brooklyn	W 73–71	9–22 (6–12)	Generoso Pope Athletic Complex (648); Brooklyn, NY
*Non-conference game. ^{#}Rankings from AP poll. (#) Tournament seedings in parentheses. All times are in Eastern.
