= 2018–19 Fairleigh Dickinson Knights men's basketball team =

American college basketball season

2018–19 Fairleigh Dickinson Knights men's basketball
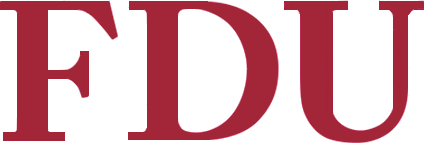

NEC tournament champions NEC regular-season co-champions

NCAA tournament, First round
- Conference: Northeast Conference
- Record: 21–14 (12–6 NEC)
- Head coach: Greg Herenda (6th season)
- Assistant coaches: Bruce Hamburger; Patrick Sellers; Pete Lappas
- Home arena: Rothman Center

2018–19 Northeast Conference men's basketball standings
	Conf.				Overall
Team	W		L	PCT	W		L	PCT
Saint Francis (PA)	12	–	6	.667	18	–	15	.545
Fairleigh Dickinson †	12	–	6	.667	21	–	14	.600
Sacred Heart	11	–	7	.611	15	–	17	.469
Robert Morris	11	–	7	.611	18	–	17	.514
St. Francis Brooklyn	9	–	9	.500	17	–	16	.515
LIU Brooklyn	9	–	9	.500	16	–	16	.500
Wagner	8	–	10	.444	13	–	17	.433
Bryant	7	–	11	.389	10	–	20	.333
Mount St. Mary's	6	–	12	.333	9	–	22	.290
Central Connecticut	5	–	13	.278	11	–	20	.355
† 2019 NEC tournament winner

The 2018–19 Fairleigh Dickinson Knights men's basketball team represented Fairleigh Dickinson University during the 2018–19 NCAA Division I men's basketball season. The team was led by sixth-year head coach Greg Herenda and played their home games at the Rothman Center in Hackensack, New Jersey as members of the Northeast Conference (NEC).

The Knights compiled a 21–14 record and went 12–6 in NEC play, to finish in a tie for first place. They defeated Wagner, Robert Morris and Saint Francis (PA) to capture the NEC tournament championship as the 2-seed. By winning the NEC tournament, the Knights received the conference's automatic bid and defeated Prairie View A&M in the First Four round of the NCAA tournament. The Knights then lost to 1-seed Gonzaga.

== Previous season ==
The Knights finished the 2017–18 season 13–18, 9–9 in NEC play, to finish in a tie for sixth place. They defeated Saint Francis (PA) in the quarterfinals of the NEC tournament before losing in the semifinals to LIU Brooklyn.

== Preseason ==
In a poll of league coaches at the NEC media day, the Knights were picked to finish in second place. Senior guard Darian Anderson was named the preseason All-NEC team.

== Roster ==
2018–19 Fairleigh Dickinson Knights men's basketball team
Players
Coaches

Pos.	#	Name	Height	Weight	Year	Hometown
G	1	Darnell Edge	6 ft 2 in (1.88 m)	185 lb (84 kg)	Sr	Saugerties, NY
G	2	Bassel Jr. Saliba	6 ft 4 in (1.93 m)	190 lb (86 kg)	Fr	Hackensack, NJ
G	3	Jahlil Jenkins	6 ft 0 in (1.83 m)	160 lb (73 kg)	So	Ranson, WV
F	5	Xzavier Malone-Key	6 ft 4 in (1.93 m)	180 lb (82 kg)	So	Philadelphia, PA
G	10	Brandon Powell	6 ft 2 in (1.88 m)	185 lb (84 kg)	Fr	Middletown, NY
G	11	Tyler Jones	5 ft 11 in (1.8 m)	165 lb (75 kg)	So	Lawrenceville, NJ
F	12	Kaleb Bishop	6 ft 8 in (2.03 m)	195 lb (88 kg)	Jr	Paterson, NJ
C	15	Oscar Okeke	6 ft 11 in (2.11 m)	225 lb (102 kg)	So	Abuja, Nigeria
F	21	Elyjah Williams	6 ft 7 in (2.01 m)	220 lb (100 kg)	So	Evanston, IL
F	24	Nadi Beciri	6 ft 7 in (2.01 m)	215 lb (98 kg)	Sr	Maywood, NJ
G	33	Pat McNamara	6 ft 5 in (1.96 m)	190 lb (86 kg)	Jr	Arlington Heights, IL
F	34	Mike Jr. Holloway	6 ft 8 in (2.03 m)	245 lb (111 kg)	Sr	Pittsgrove, NJ
F	35	Marc Dadika	6 ft 8 in (2.03 m)	210 lb (95 kg)	Fr	Saddle Brook, NJ

Head coach

- Greg Herenda (Merrimack)

Assistant coach(es)

- Bruce Hamburger (Central Connecticut State)
- Patrick Sellers (Central Connecticut State)
- Pete Lappas (Boston College)

Legend

- (C) Team captain
- (S) Suspended
- (I) Ineligible
- (W) Walk-on
- Injured
- Current redshirt

Roster
Last update: March 8, 2025

== Schedule and results ==
Date time, TV	Rank^{#}	Opponent^{#}	Result	Record	Site (attendance) city, state
Exhibition
November 1, 2018*; 7:00 p.m.		Post	W 86–61		Rothman Center (267); Hackensack, NJ
Non-conference regular season
November 9, 2018*; 7:00 p.m., BTN Plus		at Rutgers	L 55–90	0–1	Louis Brown Athletic Center (5,521); Piscataway, NJ
November 14, 2018*; 7:00 p.m.		Queens College	W 87–48	1–1	Rothman Center (450); Hackensack, NJ
November 16, 2018*; 7:00 p.m.		NYIT	W 85–57	2–1	Rothman Center (398); Hackensack, NJ
November 21, 2018*; 7:00 p.m., ESPN+		at Princeton	W 77–66	3–1	Jadwin Gymnasium (1,291); Princeton, NJ
November 25, 2018*; 3:00 p.m.		Lafayette	L 76–80	3–2	Rothman Center (242); Hackensack, NJ
November 27, 2018*; 8:30 p.m., FS1		at Providence	L 59–69	3–3	Dunkin' Donuts Center (4,879); Providence, RI
December 1, 2018*; 1:00 p.m.		at Holy Cross	L 49–67	3–4	Hart Center (1,458); Worcester, MA
December 12, 2018*; 7:00 p.m.		Army	W 93–84	4–4	Rothman Center (566); Hackensack, NJ
December 15, 2018*; 7:00 p.m.		NJIT	L 80–90	4–5	Rothman Center (612); Hackensack, NJ
December 19, 2018*; 7:00 p.m.		Saint Peter's	W 83–74	5–5	Rothman Center (688); Hackensack, NJ
December 21, 2018*; 3:30 p.m., ESPN+		at UMass	L 84–85	5–6	Mullins Center (2,276); Amherst, MA
December 29, 2018*; 1:00 p.m., ESPN3		at South Florida	L 54–60	5–7	Yuengling Center (2,945); Tampa, FL
NEC regular season
January 3, 2019; 7:00 p.m.		at Robert Morris	L 62–69	5–8 (0–1)	North Athletic Complex (1,016); Pittsburgh, PA
January 5, 2019; 7:00 p.m.		at Saint Francis (PA)	W 79–61	6–8 (1–1)	DeGol Arena (704); Loretto, PA
January 10, 2019; 7:00 p.m.		Central Connecticut	L 96–103 ^{2OT}	6–9 (1–2)	Rothman Center (327); Hackensack, NJ
January 12, 2019; 4:00 p.m.		at Wagner	L 60–66	6–10 (1–3)	Spiro Sports Center (1,712); Staten Island, NY
January 19, 2019; 4:30 p.m.		at LIU Brooklyn	L 77–79	6–11 (1–4)	Steinberg Wellness Center (492); Brooklyn, NY
January 21, 2019; 2:00 p.m.		Mount St. Mary's	W 87–69	7–11 (2–4)	Rothman Center (443); Hackensack, NJ
January 24, 2019; 7:00 p.m.		St. Francis Brooklyn	W 60–58	8–11 (3–4)	Rothman Center (592); Hackensack, NJ
January 26, 2019; 4:00 p.m.		at Bryant	W 78–63	9–11 (4–4)	Chace Athletic Center (847); Smithfield, RI
January 31, 2019; 5:00 p.m., ESPNU		LIU Brooklyn	W 80–77	10–11 (5–4)	Rothman Center (990); Hackensack, NJ
February 2, 2019; 4:30 p.m.		Robert Morris	W 97–94 ^{2OT}	11–11 (6–4)	Rothman Center (610); Hackensack, NJ
February 7, 2019; 6:00 p.m.		at Sacred Heart	L 63–69	11–12 (6–5)	William H. Pitt Center (567); Fairfield, CT
February 9, 2019; 4:00 p.m.		at St. Francis Brooklyn	W 84–73	12–12 (7–5)	Generoso Pope Athletic Complex (707); Brooklyn, NY
February 14, 2019; 6:00 p.m., CBSSN		Saint Francis (PA)	L 62–87	12–13 (7–6)	Rothman Center; Hackensack, NJ
February 16, 2019; 4:30 p.m.		Bryant	W 97–84	13–13 (8–6)	Rothman Center (576); Hackensack, NJ
February 21, 2019; 7:00 p.m.		Sacred Heart	W 81–63	14–13 (9–6)	Rothman Center; Hackensack, NJ
February 23, 2019; 4:30 p.m.		Wagner	W 74–66	15–13 (10–6)	Rothman Center (742); Hackensack, NJ
February 28, 2019; 7:00 p.m.		at Mount St. Mary's	W 65–59	16–13 (11–6)	Knott Arena (2,032); Emmitsburg, MD
Mar 2, 2019; 1:00 p.m.		at Central Connecticut	W 70–58	17–13 (12–6)	William H. Detrick Gymnasium (1,114); New Britain, CT
NEC tournament
March 6, 2019; 7:00 p.m., NEC Front Row	(2)	(7) Wagner; Quarterfinal	W 84–46	18–13	Rothman Center (1,190); Hackensack, NJ
March 9, 2019; 2:00 p.m., ESPN3	(2)	(4) Robert Morris; Semifinal	W 66–62	19–13	Rothman Center (1,212); Hackensack, NJ
March 12, 2019; 7:00 p.m., ESPN2	(2)	at (1) Saint Francis (PA); Championship	W 85–76	20–13	DeGol Arena (2,610); Loretto, PA
NCAA tournament
March 19, 2019*; 6:40 p.m., truTV	(16 W)	vs. (16 W) Prairie View A&M; First Four	W 82–76	21–13	UD Arena (11,784); Dayton, OH
March 21, 2019*; 7:27 p.m., truTV	(16 W)	vs. (1 W) No. 4 Gonzaga; First round	L 49–87	21–14	Vivint Smart Home Arena (16,807); Salt Lake City, UT
*Non-conference game. ^{#}Rankings from AP poll. (#) Tournament seedings in parentheses. All times are in Eastern.
