= 2019 Northeast Conference men's basketball tournament =

- Classification: Division I
- Season: 2018–19
- Teams: 8
- Site: Campus sites
- Champions: Fairleigh Dickinson (6th title)
- Winning coach: Greg Herenda (2nd title)
- MVP: Darnell Edge (Fairleigh Dickinson)
- Television: NEC Front Row, ESPN3, ESPN2

2018–19 Northeast Conference men's basketball standings
	Conf.				Overall
Team	W		L	PCT	W		L	PCT
Saint Francis (PA)	12	–	6	.667	18	–	15	.545
Fairleigh Dickinson †	12	–	6	.667	21	–	14	.600
Sacred Heart	11	–	7	.611	15	–	17	.469
Robert Morris	11	–	7	.611	18	–	17	.514
St. Francis Brooklyn	9	–	9	.500	17	–	16	.515
LIU Brooklyn	9	–	9	.500	16	–	16	.500
Wagner	8	–	10	.444	13	–	17	.433
Bryant	7	–	11	.389	10	–	20	.333
Mount St. Mary's	6	–	12	.333	9	–	22	.290
Central Connecticut	5	–	13	.278	11	–	20	.355
† 2019 NEC tournament winner

The 2019 Northeast Conference men's basketball tournament was the postseason men's basketball tournament for the Northeast Conference for the 2018–19 NCAA Division I men's basketball season. All tournament games are played at the home arena of the highest seed. The tournament took place March 6 through March 12, 2019. Fairleigh Dickinson defeated Saint Francis (PA) 85–76 in the championship game to win the tournament, and received the NEC's automatic bid to the 2019 NCAA tournament.

== Seeds ==
The top eight teams in the Northeast Conference are eligible to compete in the conference tournament. Teams were seeded by record within the conference, with a tiebreaker system to seed teams with identical conference records.

Seed	School	Conference	Tiebreaker	Tiebreaker 2
1	Saint Francis (PA)	12–6	1–1 vs FDU	3–1 vs SHU/RMU
2	Fairleigh Dickinson	12–6	1–1 vs SFU	2–2 vs SHU/RMU
3	Sacred Heart	11–7	1–1 vs RMU	2–2 vs SFU/FDU
4	Robert Morris	11–7	1–1 vs SHU	1–3 vs SFU/FDU
5	St. Francis Brooklyn	9–9	2–0 vs LIU	
6	LIU Brooklyn	9–9	0–2 vs SFBK	
7	Wagner	8–10		
8	Bryant	7–11		
DNQ	Mount St. Mary's	6–12		
DNQ	Central Connecticut	5–13		

== Schedule and results ==
Game	Time	Matchup	Score	Television
Quarterfinals – Wednesday, March 6
1	7:00pm	(8) Bryant at (1) Saint Francis (PA)	63–67	NEC Front Row
2	7:00pm	(5) St. Francis Brooklyn at (4) Robert Morris	65–69	NEC Front Row
3	7:00pm	(7) Wagner at (2) Fairleigh Dickinson	46–84	NEC Front Row
4	6:00pm	(6) LIU Brooklyn at (3) Sacred Heart	71–62	NEC Front Row
Semifinals – Saturday, March 9
5	12:00 pm	(4) Robert Morris at (2) Fairleigh Dickinson	62–66	ESPN3/NEC Front Row
6	2:00 pm	(6) LIU Brooklyn at (1) Saint Francis (PA)	64–72	ESPN3/NEC Front Row
Final – Tuesday, March 12
7	7:00 pm	(2) Fairleigh Dickinson at (1) Saint Francis PA	85–76	ESPN2
Game times in EST through Semifinals. Game times in EDT through Finals. Rankings denote tournament seed

Note: Bracket is re-seeded after quarterfinal matchups, with highest remaining seed playing the lowest remaining seed in the semifinals.

== Bracket and results ==
Teams are reseeded after each round with highest remaining seeds receiving home court advantage.

Quarterfinals; Wednesday, March 6, 2019; NEC Front Row
1	Saint Francis (PA)	67
8	Bryant	63
3	Sacred Heart	62
6	LIU Brooklyn	71
(Pairings are reseeded after the first round)
2	Fairleigh Dickinson	84
7	Wagner	46
4	Robert Morris	69^{OT}
5	St. Francis Brooklyn	65

Semifinals; Saturday, March 9, 2019; ESPN3/NEC Front Row
1	Saint Francis (PA)	72
6	LIU Brooklyn	64
2	Fairleigh Dickinson	66
4	Robert Morris	62

Championship; Tuesday, March 12, 2019; ESPN2
1	Saint Francis (PA)	76
2	Fairleigh Dickinson	85

== All-tournament team ==
Tournament MVP in bold.

Name	School
**Darnell Edge**	Fairleigh Dickinson
Jahlil Jenkins	Fairleigh Dickinson
Keith Braxton	Saint Francis (PA)
Jamaal King	Saint Francis (PA)
Matty McConnell	Robert Morris

== See also ==
- 2019 Northeast Conference women's basketball tournament
