= 2018–19 Sacred Heart Pioneers men's basketball team =

American college basketball season

2018–19 Sacred Heart Pioneers men's basketball
- Conference: Northeast Conference
- Record: 15–17 (11–7 NEC)
- Head coach: Anthony Latina (6th season)
- Assistant coaches: Johnny Kidd; Kevin Papacs; Kyle Steinway
- Home arena: William H. Pitt Center

2018–19 Northeast Conference men's basketball standings
| | Conf. | | | | Overall |
| Team | W | | L | PCT | W | | L | PCT |
|---|---|---|---|---|---|---|---|---|
| Saint Francis (PA) | 12 | – | 6 | .667 | 18 | – | 15 | .545 |
| Fairleigh Dickinson † | 12 | – | 6 | .667 | 21 | – | 14 | .600 |
| Sacred Heart | 11 | – | 7 | .611 | 15 | – | 17 | .469 |
| Robert Morris | 11 | – | 7 | .611 | 18 | – | 17 | .514 |
| St. Francis Brooklyn | 9 | – | 9 | .500 | 17 | – | 16 | .515 |
| LIU Brooklyn | 9 | – | 9 | .500 | 16 | – | 16 | .500 |
| Wagner | 8 | – | 10 | .444 | 13 | – | 17 | .433 |
| Bryant | 7 | – | 11 | .389 | 10 | – | 20 | .333 |
| Mount St. Mary's | 6 | – | 12 | .333 | 9 | – | 22 | .290 |
| Central Connecticut | 5 | – | 13 | .278 | 11 | – | 20 | .355 |
† 2019 NEC tournament winner

The 2018–19 Sacred Heart Pioneers men's basketball team represented Sacred Heart University during the 2018–19 NCAA Division I men's basketball season. This was the Pioneers' 20th season of NCAA Division I basketball, all played in the Northeast Conference. The Pioneers were led by sixth-year head coach Anthony Latina and played their home games at the William H. Pitt Center in Fairfield, Connecticut.

The Pioneers finished the 2018–19 season 15–17, 11–7 in NEC play to finish in third place. As the three-seed, they lost to six-seed LIU Brooklyn in the quarterfinals of the NEC tournament.

== Previous season ==
The Pioneers finished the 2017–18 season 10–21, 5–13 in NEC play to finish in ninth place. They failed to qualify for the NEC tournament.

== Preseason ==
In a poll of league coaches at the NEC media day, the Pioneers were picked to finish in ninth place.

== Roster ==
2018–19 Sacred Heart Pioneers men's basketball team
Players
Coaches

| Pos. | # | Name | Height | Weight | Year | Hometown |
|---|---|---|---|---|---|---|
| G | 22 | Sean Hoehn | 6 ft 2 in (1.88 m) | 195 lb (88 kg) | Sr | Morristown, New Jersey |
| F | 25 | Jare'l Spellman | 6 ft 10 in (2.08 m) | 205 lb (93 kg) | RS Jr | Glen Allen, Virginia |
| G | 30 | Kinnon LaRose | 6 ft 3 in (1.91 m) | 185 lb (84 kg) | RS Jr | Ogdensburg, New York |
| G | 2 | Zach Radz | 6 ft 2 in (1.88 m) | 185 lb (84 kg) | Jr | Watervliet, New York |
| F | 24 | E.J. Anosike | 6 ft 8 in (2.03 m) | 245 lb (111 kg) | So | East Orange, New Jersey |
| G | 4 | Alex Watson | 6 ft 3 in (1.91 m) | 170 lb (77 kg) | So | Marietta, Georgia |
| G | 1 | Anthony Boateng | 5 ft 9 in (1.75 m) | 150 lb (68 kg) | RS Fr | Bronx, New York |
| G | 0 | Aaron Clarke | 6 ft 1 in (1.85 m) | 185 lb (84 kg) | Fr | Parsippany, New Jersey |
| G | 2 | Koreem Ozier | 6 ft 1 in (1.85 m) | 180 lb (82 kg) | Fr | Racine, Wisconsin |
| F | 3 | Myles Cephas | 6 ft 7 in (2.01 m) | 215 lb (98 kg) | Fr | Chicago, Illinois |
| F | 5 | Zach Pfaffenberger | 6 ft 8 in (2.03 m) | 215 lb (98 kg) | Fr | Midlothian, Virginia |
| G | 11 | Cameron Parker | 6 ft 2 in (1.88 m) | 170 lb (77 kg) | Fr | Beaverton, Oregon |
| G | 13 | Chaylyn Martin | 6 ft 3 in (1.91 m) | 160 lb (73 kg) | Fr | Hartford, Connecticut |
| F | 21 | Gabe Vonleh II | 6 ft 5 in (1.96 m) | 210 lb (95 kg) | Fr | Sharon, Massachusetts |

Head coach

- Anthony Latina (Brandeis)

Assistant coach(es)

- Johnny Kidd (Central Connecticut State)
- Kevin Papacs (Central Connecticut State)
- Kyle Steinway (Providence)

Legend

- (C) Team captain
- (S) Suspended
- (I) Ineligible
- (W) Walk-on
- Injured
- Current redshirt

Roster

== Schedule and results ==
| Date time, TV | Rank^{#} | Opponent^{#} | Result | Record | Site (attendance) city, state |
Non-conference regular season
| November 6, 2018*; 7:05 pm | | at Holy Cross | L 81–93 | 0–1 | Hart Center (1,032); Worcester, MA |
| November 12, 2018*; 7:30 pm | | Western New England | W 114–72 | 1–1 | William H. Pitt Center (1,339); Fairfield, CT |
| November 16, 2018*; 5:00 pm, ESPN+ | | vs. Army; Brown Bears Tipoff Classic | W 79–78 | 2–1 | Pizzitola Sports Center; Providence, RI |
| November 17, 2018*; 6:00 pm, ESPN+ | | vs. Brown; Brown Bears Tipoff Classic | L 77–82 | 2–2 | Pizzitola Sports Center (864); Providence, RI |
| November 18, 2018*; 1:30 pm | | UMass Lowell; Brown Bears Tipoff Classic | L 90–94 | 2–3 | Pizzitola Sports Center; Providence, CT |
| November 24, 2018*; 2:00 pm, ESPN+ | | at Binghamton | L 73–78 | 2–4 | Binghamton University Events Center (1,827); Binghamton, NY |
| November 27, 2018*; 6:00 pm, ESPN3 | | Hartford | W 98–89 | 3–4 | William H. Pitt Center (758); Fairfield, CT |
| November 29, 2018*; 7:00 pm, ACCN Extra | | at Boston College | L 73–81 | 3–5 | Conte Forum (3,410); Chestnut Hill, MA |
| December 2, 2018*; 2:00 pm, WBPH | | at Lafayette | W 64–62 | 4–5 | Kirby Sports Center (1,322); Easton, PA |
| December 10, 2018*; 12:00 pm | | at Dartmouth | L 73–82 | 4–6 | Leede Arena (1,718); Hanover, NH |
| December 19, 2018*; 6:30 pm, FS2 | | at Seton Hall | L 76–90 | 4–7 | Prudential Center (7,107); Newark, NJ |
| December 22, 2018*; 8:00 pm, FS1 | | at St. John's | L 82–104 | 4–8 | Carnesecca Arena (5,602); Queens, NY |
| December 29, 2018*; 7:00 pm | | UMass Lowell | L 91–100 | 4–9 | William H. Pitt Center; Fairfield, CT |
NEC Regular season
| January 3, 2019; 6:00 pm | | LIU Brooklyn | W 79–75 | 5–9 (1–0) | William H. Pitt Center (384); Fairfield, CT |
| January 5, 2019; 3:30 pm | | Central Connecticut | W 73–61 | 6–9 (2–0) | William H. Pitt Center (553); Fairfield, CT |
| January 10, 2019; 7:00 pm | | at Wagner | L 73–76 | 6–10 (2–1) | Spiro Sports Center (1,508); Staten Island, NY |
| January 12, 2019; 2:00 pm | | Bryant | W 98–70 | 7–10 (3–1) | William H. Pitt Center (536); Fairfield, CT |
| January 19, 2019; 4:00 pm | | at St. Francis Brooklyn | L 85–92 | 7–11 (3–2) | Generoso Pope Athletic Complex (471); Brooklyn, NY |
| January 21, 2019; 3:30 pm | | Wagner | W 62–38 | 8–11 (4–2) | William H. Pitt Center (707); Fairfield, CT |
| January 24, 2019; 7:00 pm | | at Robert Morris | L 64–72 | 8–12 (4–3) | PPG Paints Arena (1,016); Pittsburgh, PA |
| January 26, 2019; 7:00 pm | | at Saint Francis (PA) | L 78–79 | 8–13 (4–4) | DeGol Arena (1,344); Loretto, PA |
| January 31, 2019; 7:00 pm | | at Mount St. Mary's | W 87–79 | 9–13 (5–4) | Knott Arena (1,621); Emmitsburg, MD |
| February 2, 2019; 3:30 pm | | St. Francis Brooklyn | W 71-62 | 10-13 (6-4) | William H. Pitt Center (638); Fairfield, CT |
| February 7, 2019; 6:00 pm | | Fairleigh Dickinson | W 69–63 | 11–13 (7–4) | William H. Pitt Center (567); Fairfield, CT |
| February 9, 2019; 3:00 pm | | Mount St. Mary's | L 73–76 | 11–14 (7–5) | William H. Pitt Center (1,082); Fairfield, CT |
| February 14, 2019; 7:00 pm | | at Bryant | W 105–104 | 12–14 (8–5) | Chace Athletic Center (631); Smithfield, RI |
| February 16, 2019; 2:00 pm | | at LIU Brooklyn | L 84–92 | 12–15 (8–6) | Steinberg Wellness Center (597); Brooklyn, NY |
| February 21, 2019; 7:00 pm | | at Fairleigh Dickinson | L 63–81 | 12–16 (8–7) | Rothman Center; Hackensack, NJ |
| February 23, 2019; 3:30 pm | | at Central Connecticut State | W 80–66 | 13–16 (9–7) | William H. Detrick Gymnasium (1,254); New Britain, CT |
| February 28, 2018; 6:00 pm | | Robert Morris | W 87–63 | 14–16 (10–7) | William H. Pitt Center; Fairfield, CT |
| March 2, 2019; 3:30 pm | | Saint Francis (PA) | W 94–84 | 15–16 (11–7) | William H. Pitt Center (507); Fairfield, CT |
NEC tournament
| March 6, 2019; 6:00 pm, NEC Front Row | (3) | (6) LIU Brooklyn; Quarterfinals | L 62–71 | 15–17 | William H. Pitt Center (494); Fairfield, CT |
*Non-conference game. ^{#}Rankings from AP Poll. (#) Tournament seedings in parentheses. All times are in Eastern Time..
