= 2018–19 Seton Hall Pirates men's basketball team =

American college basketball season

2018–19 Seton Hall Pirates men's basketball

Wooden Legacy champions

NCAA tournament, First Round
- Conference: Big East Conference
- Record: 20–14 (9–9 Big East)
- Head coach: Kevin Willard (9th season)
- Assistant coaches: Grant Billmeier; Tony Skinn; Duane Woodward
- Home arena: Prudential Center; Walsh Gymnasium

2018–19 Big East men's basketball standings
| | Conf. | | | | Overall |
| Team | W | | L | PCT | W | | L | PCT |
|---|---|---|---|---|---|---|---|---|
| No. 23 Villanova † | 13 | – | 5 | .722 | 26 | – | 10 | .722 |
| Marquette | 12 | – | 6 | .667 | 24 | – | 10 | .706 |
| Seton Hall | 9 | – | 9 | .500 | 20 | – | 14 | .588 |
| Xavier | 9 | – | 9 | .500 | 19 | – | 16 | .543 |
| Creighton | 9 | – | 9 | .500 | 20 | – | 15 | .571 |
| Georgetown | 9 | – | 9 | .500 | 19 | – | 14 | .576 |
| St. John's | 8 | – | 10 | .444 | 21 | – | 13 | .618 |
| Providence | 7 | – | 11 | .389 | 18 | – | 16 | .529 |
| Butler | 7 | – | 11 | .389 | 16 | – | 17 | .485 |
| DePaul | 7 | – | 11 | .389 | 19 | – | 17 | .528 |
† 2019 Big East tournament winner Rankings from AP Poll

The 2018–19 Seton Hall Pirates men's basketball team represented Seton Hall University in the 2018–19 NCAA Division I men's basketball season. They were led by ninth-year head coach Kevin Willard. The Pirates played their home games at the Prudential Center in Newark, New Jersey and Walsh Gymnasium in South Orange, New Jersey as members of the Big East Conference. They finished the season 20–14, 9–9 for a 4 way tie for 3rd place. In the Big East tournament, they defeated Georgetown in the Quarterfinals, Marquette in the semifinals before losing to Villanova in the championship. They received a at-large bid to the NCAA Tournament where they lost in the First Round to Wofford.

== Previous season ==
The Pirates finished the 2017–18 season 22–12, 10–8 in Big East play to finish in a three-way tie for third place. In the Big East tournament, they lost to Butler in the quarterfinals. They received an at-large bid to the NCAA tournament as the No. 8 seed in the Midwest region. There they defeated NC State in the First Round before losing to Kansas in the Second Round.

== Offseason ==
=== Departures ===
| Name | Number | Pos. | Height | Weight | Year | Hometown | Reason for departure |
|---|---|---|---|---|---|---|---|
| Khadeen Carrington | 0 | G | 6'4" | 195 | Senior | Brooklyn, NY | Graduated |
| Jordan Walker | 2 | G | 5'11" | 155 | Freshman | Port Washington, NY | Transferred to Tulane |
| Eron Gordon | 4 | G | 6'3" | 200 | Sophomore | Indianapolis, IN | Transferred to Valparaiso |
| Ismael Sanogo | 14 | F | 6'8" | 215 | Senior | Newark, NJ | Graduated |
| Desi Rodriguez | 20 | F | 6'6" | 220 | Senior | Bronx, NY | Graduated |
| Philip Flory | 25 | G/F | 6'5" | 190 | Freshman | Oshkosh, WI | Walk-on; transferred to Albany |
| Ángel Delgado | 31 | C | 6'10" | 245 | Senior | Bajos de Haina, Dominican Republic | Graduated |

=== Incoming transfers ===
| Name | Number | Pos. | Height | Weight | Year | Hometown | Previous School |
|---|---|---|---|---|---|---|---|
| Ike Obiagu | 21 | C | 7'0" | 240 | Sophomore | Abuja, Nigeria | Transferred from Florida State. Under NCAA transfer rules, Obiagu will have to sit out for the 2018–19 season. Will have three years of remaining eligibility. |

=== Class of 2018 recruits ===
College recruiting
| Name | Hometown | School | Height | Weight | Commit date |
|---|---|---|---|---|---|
| Anthony Nelson; PG | Harlem, NY | South Kent School | 6 ft 4 in (1.93 m) | 180 lb (82 kg) | Oct 24, 2017 |
| Anthony Nelson; PG | Recruit ratings: Scout: Rivals: 247Sports: (4) | | | | |
| Jared Rhoden; SG | Baldwin, NY | Our Saviour Lutheran School | 6 ft 6 in (1.98 m) | 190 lb (86 kg) | Oct 28, 2017 |
| Jared Rhoden; SG | Recruit ratings: Scout: Rivals: 247Sports: (79) | | | | |
| Darnell Brodie; C | Newark, NJ | Montverde Academy | 6 ft 9 in (2.06 m) | 250 lb (110 kg) | Dec 24, 2016 |
| Darnell Brodie; C | Recruit ratings: Scout: Rivals: 247Sports: (NR) | | | | |
Overall recruit ranking:
Note: In many cases, Scout, Rivals, 247Sports, On3, and ESPN may conflict in their listings of height and weight.; In these cases, the average was taken. ESPN grades are on a 100-point scale.; Sources: "2018 Team Ranking". Rivals.

== Roster ==
2018–19 Seton Hall Pirates men's basketball team
Players
Coaches

| Pos. | # | Name | Height | Weight | Year | Previous school | Hometown |
|---|---|---|---|---|---|---|---|
| G | 0 | Quincy McKnight | 6 ft 4 in (1.93 m) | 185 lb (84 kg) | RS Jr | Sacred Heart | Bridgeport, Connecticut |
| F | 1 | Michael Nzei | 6 ft 8 in (2.03 m) | 205 lb (93 kg) | RS Sr | Our Savior New American School | Makurdi, Nigeria |
| G | 2 | Anthony Nelson | 6 ft 4 in (1.93 m) | 175 lb (79 kg) | Fr | South Kent School | New York, New York |
| G | 13 | Myles Powell | 6 ft 2 in (1.88 m) | 200 lb (91 kg) | Jr | Trenton Catholic Academy | Trenton, New Jersey |
| G/F | 14 | Jared Rhoden | 6 ft 6 in (1.98 m) | 205 lb (93 kg) | Fr | Our Saviour Lutheran School | Baldwin, New York |
| F | 15 | Taurean Thompson | 6 ft 10 in (2.08 m) | 225 lb (102 kg) | RS So | Syracuse | Jersey City, New Jersey |
| C | 21 | Ike Obiagu (redshirt) | 7 ft 1 in (2.16 m) | 255 lb (116 kg) | So | Florida State | Abuja, Nigeria |
| G/F | 22 | Myles Cale | 6 ft 5 in (1.96 m) | 210 lb (95 kg) | So | Appoquinimink High School | Middletown, Delaware |
| F | 23 | Sandro Mamukelashvili | 6 ft 10 in (2.08 m) | 230 lb (104 kg) | So | Montverde Academy | Tbilisi, Georgia |
| F | 32 | Darnell Brodie | 6 ft 9 in (2.06 m) | 265 lb (120 kg) | Fr | East Side | Newark, New Jersey |
| G | 33 | Shavar Reynolds | 6 ft 2 in (1.88 m) | 195 lb (88 kg) | So | Manchester Township High School | Manchester, New Jersey |
| C | 35 | Romaro Gill | 7 ft 2 in (2.18 m) | 245 lb (111 kg) | RS Jr | Vincennes | St. Thomas, Jamaica |

Head coach

- Kevin Willard (Pittsburgh)

Assistant coach(es)

- Grant Billmeier (Seton Hall)
- Tony Skinn (George Mason)
- Duane Woodward (Boston College)

Legend

- (C) Team captain
- (S) Suspended
- (I) Ineligible
- (W) Walk-on
- Injured
- Current redshirt

Roster

== Schedule and results ==
| Date time, TV | Rank^{#} | Opponent^{#} | Result | Record | High points | High rebounds | High assists | Site (attendance) city, state |
Exhibition
| October 27, 2018*; 12:00 pm | | at Boston College; Charity exhibition | W 76–62 | – | 25 – Powell | 13 – Mamukelashvili | 4 – Nelson | Conte Forum (N/A); Chestnut Hill, MA |
| November 9, 2018*; 3:00 pm | | New Haven | W 73–62 | – | 20 – Cale | 10 – Nzei | 5 – McKnight | Walsh Gymnasium (1,665); South Orange, NJ |
Non-conference regular season
| November 6, 2018*; 6:30 pm, FS2 | | Wagner | W 89–49 | 1–0 | 30 – Powell | 7 – Nzei | 5 – Nelson | Walsh Gymnasium (1,655); South Orange, NJ |
| November 14, 2018*; 7:30 pm, BTN | | at Nebraska; Gavitt Tipoff Games | L 57–80 | 1–1 | 24 – Powell | 12 – Mamukelashvili | 2 – Nelson | Pinnacle Bank Arena (15,713); Lincoln, NE |
| November 17, 2018*; 8:00 pm, FS2 | | Saint Louis | L 64–66 | 1–2 | 16 – Powell | 7 – Mamukelashvili | 2 – Cale | Prudential Center (7,854); Newark, NJ |
| November 22, 2018*; 9:00 pm, ESPN3 | | vs. Grand Canyon; Wooden Legacy quarterfinals | W 82–75 | 2–2 | 40 – Powell | 8 – Mamukelashvili | 5 – Cale | Titan Gym; Fullerton, CA |
| November 23, 2018*; 11:30pm, ESPN2 | | vs. Hawaii; Wooden Legacy semifinals | W 64–54 | 3–2 | 19 – Powell | 9 – Mamukelashvili | 5 – Nelson | Titan Gym; Fullerton, CA |
| November 25, 2018*; 10:30pm, ESPN2 | | vs. Miami (FL); Wooden Legacy championship | W 83–81 | 4–2 | 21 – Nzei | 5 – Tied | 5 – McKnight | Titan Gym; Fullerton, CA |
| December 1, 2018*; 12:00 pm, FOX | | Louisville | L 65–70 | 4–3 | 23 – Powell | 6 – Nzei | 4 – Nzei | Prudential Center (8,505); Newark, NJ |
| December 4, 2018*; 6:30 pm, FS1 | | New Hampshire | W 77–57 | 5–3 | 18 – McKnight | 11 – Mamukelashvili | 4 – Powell | Prudential Center (6,380); Newark, NJ |
| December 8, 2018*; 12:00 pm, FOX | | vs. No. 9 Kentucky; Citi Hoops Classic | W 84–83 ^{OT} | 6–3 | 28 – Powell | 8 – Mamukelashvili | 5 – McKnight | Madison Square Garden (10,244); New York, NY |
| December 15, 2018*; 2:00 pm, FS1 | | Rutgers; Rivalry/Garden State Hardwood Classic | W 72–66 | 7–3 | 28 – Powell | 9 – Mamukelashvili | 4 – McKnight | Prudential Center (10,481); Newark, NJ |
| December 19, 2018*; 6:30 pm, FS2 | | Sacred Heart | W 90–76 | 8–3 | 23 – Mamukelashvili | 8 – Mamukelashvili | 8 – Nelson | Prudential Center (7,107); Newark, NJ |
| December 22, 2018*; 5:30 pm, FS1 | | at Maryland | W 78–74 | 9–3 | 27 – Powell | 8 – Gill | 4 – McKnight | Xfinity Center (12,555); College Park, MD |
Big East regular season
| December 29, 2018; 8:30 pm, FSN | | St. John's | W 76–74 | 10–3 (1–0) | 15 – Powell | 10 – Nzei | 4 – Tied | Prudential Center (10,481); Newark, NJ |
| January 2, 2019; 6:30 pm, FS1 | | at Xavier | W 80–70 | 11–3 (2–0) | 25 – Powell | 6 – Powell | 8 – Powell | Cintas Center (10,224); Cincinnati, OH |
| January 6, 2019; 1:00 pm, FS1 | | at DePaul | L 74–75 | 11–4 (2–1) | 16 – Powell | 7 – Nzei | 3 – Tied | Wintrust Arena (4,068); Chicago, IL |
| January 9, 2019; 8:30 pm, FS1 | | Butler | W 76–75 | 12–4 (3–1) | 31 – Powell | 8 – Tied | 6 – McKnight | Prudential Center (7,640); Newark, NJ |
| January 12, 2019; 2:00 pm, FS1 | | at No. 21 Marquette | L 66–70 | 12–5 (3–2) | 21 – Powell | 9 – Powell | 7 – McKnight | Fiserv Forum (17,108); Milwaukee, WI |
| January 15, 2019; 6:30 pm, FS1 | | at Providence | L 63–72 | 12–6 (3–3) | 16 – McKnight | 8 – Nzei | 4 – McKnight | Dunkin' Donuts Center (11,367); Providence, RI |
| January 19, 2019; 8:00 pm, FS1 | | DePaul | L 93–97 | 12–7 (3–4) | 25 – McKnight | 10 – Mamukelashvili | 9 – McKnight | Prudential Center (9,023); Newark, NJ |
| January 27, 2019; 2:30 pm, FOX | | at No. 18 Villanova | L 52–80 | 12–8 (3–5) | 14 – Cale | 7 – Mamukelashvili | 3 – Tied | Wells Fargo Center (16,444); Philadelphia, PA |
| January 30, 2019; 7:00 pm, FSN | | Providence | W 65–63 | 13–8 (4–5) | 31 – Powell | 9 – Thompson | 2 – Tied | Prudential Center (7,858); Newark, NJ |
| February 2, 2019; 12:00 pm, FS1 | | at Butler | L 68–70 | 13–9 (4–6) | 21 – Powell | 6 – Gill | 5 – McKnight | Hinkle Fieldhouse (9,102); Indianapolis, IN |
| February 9, 2019; 8:00 pm, CBSSN | | Creighton | W 63–58 | 14–9 (5–6) | 22 – Powell | 10 – Mamukelashvili | 5 – Nelson | Prudential Center (9,681); Newark, NJ |
| February 13, 2019; 8:30 pm, FS1 | | Georgetown | W 90–75 | 15–9 (6–6) | 30 – Powell | 9 – Nzei | 9 – McKnight | Prudential Center (7,828); Newark, NJ |
| February 17, 2019; 3:00 pm, FS1 | | at Creighton | W 81–75 | 16–9 (7–6) | 20 – Cale | 9 – Mamukelashvili | 4 – Tied | CHI Health Center Omaha (17,036); Omaha, NE |
| February 20, 2019; 7:00 pm, CBSSN | | Xavier | L 69–70 | 16–10 (7–7) | 21 – Cale | 8 – Tied | 4 – McKnight | Prudential Center (7,916); Newark, NJ |
| February 23, 2019; 8:00 pm, FS1 | | at St. John's | L 70–78 | 16–11 (7–8) | 26 – Powell | 8 – Mamukelashvili | 3 – Powell | Madison Square Garden (18,529); New York, NY |
| March 2, 2019; 6:30 pm, CBSSN | | at Georgetown | L 71–77 ^{2OT} | 16–12 (7–9) | 35 – Powell | 11 – Mamukelashvili | 5 – McKnight | Capital One Arena (13,753); Washington, D.C. |
| March 6, 2019; 6:30 pm, FS1 | | No. 16 Marquette | W 73–64 | 17–12 (8–9) | 34 – Powell | 8 – Cale | 6 – McKnight | Prudential Center (9,080); Newark, NJ |
| March 9, 2019; 12:00 pm, FOX | | No. 23 Villanova | W 79–75 | 18–12 (9–9) | 20 – Powell | 18 – Mamukelashvili | 5 – Tied | Prudential Center (16,114); Newark, NJ |
Big East tournament
| March 14, 2019; 9:40 pm, FS1 | (3) | vs. (6) Georgetown; Quarterfinals | W 73–57 | 19–12 | 31 – Powell | 10 – Mamukelashvili | 3 – Tied | Madison Square Garden (19,812); New York, NY |
| March 14, 2019; 9:00 pm, FS1 | (3) | vs. (2) No. 23 Marquette; Semifinals | W 81–79 | 20–12 | 22 – Powell | 15 – Nzei | 7 – Powell | Madison Square Garden (19,812); New York, NY |
| March 15, 2019; 6:30 pm, FOX | (3) | vs. (1) No. 25 Villanova; Championship | L 72–74 | 20–13 | 25 – Powell | 14 – Mamukelashvili | 4 – Powell | Madison Square Garden (19,812); New York, NY |
NCAA tournament
| March 21, 2019*; 9:40 pm, CBS | (10 MW) | vs. (7 MW) No. 19 Wofford; First Round | L 68–84 | 20–14 | 27 – Powell | 8 – McKnight | 3 – Powell | VyStar Veterans Memorial Arena (13,495); Jacksonville, FL |
*Non-conference game. ^{#}Rankings from AP Poll. (#) Tournament seedings in parentheses. MW=Midwest. All times are in Eastern Time.
