= 2018–19 Northeast Conference men's basketball season =

- League: NCAA Division I
- Sport: Basketball
- Number of teams: 10
- TV partner(s): NEC Front Row, ESPN2, MSG, FCS, Regional Sports Networks

NBA Draft

Regular season
- First place: Saint Francis (PA)
- Season MVP: Keith Braxton, SFPA
- Top scorer: Raiquan Clark, LIU

NEC tournament
- Champions: Fairleigh Dickinson
- Finals MVP: Darnell Edge, FDU

Northeast Conference men's basketball seasons
- ← 2017–18 2019–20 →

2018–19 Northeast Conference men's basketball standings
	Conf.				Overall
Team	W		L	PCT	W		L	PCT
Saint Francis (PA)	12	–	6	.667	18	–	15	.545
Fairleigh Dickinson †	12	–	6	.667	21	–	14	.600
Sacred Heart	11	–	7	.611	15	–	17	.469
Robert Morris	11	–	7	.611	18	–	17	.514
St. Francis Brooklyn	9	–	9	.500	17	–	16	.515
LIU Brooklyn	9	–	9	.500	16	–	16	.500
Wagner	8	–	10	.444	13	–	17	.433
Bryant	7	–	11	.389	10	–	20	.333
Mount St. Mary's	6	–	12	.333	9	–	22	.290
Central Connecticut	5	–	13	.278	11	–	20	.355
† 2019 NEC tournament winner

The 2018–19 Northeast Conference men's basketball season began with practices in October 2018, followed by the start of the 2018–19 NCAA Division I men's basketball season in November. Conference play started in January and concluded in March 2019.

The NEC tournament was held from March 3 through March 9 with the higher-seeded team hosting each game.

== Head coaches ==
=== Coaching changes ===
On April 2, 2018, Bryant announced Jared Grasso as the 8th head coach in program history. Grasso replaced Tim O'Shea, who retired after last season.

On May 10, 2018, Mount St. Mary's announced Dan Engelstad as the 22nd head coach in program history. Engelstad replaced Jamion Christian, who went on to become the head coach at Siena.

=== Coaches ===
Team	Head coach	Previous job	Year at school	Overall record	NEC record	NEC tournament championships
Bryant	Jared Grasso	Iona (asst.)	1	0–0	0–0	0
Central Connecticut	Donyell Marshall	Buffalo (asst.)	2	20–41	11–25	0
Fairleigh Dickinson	Greg Herenda	UMass Lowell	6	60–94	38–50	1
LIU Brooklyn	Derek Kellogg	UMass	2	18–17	10–8	1
Mount St. Mary's	Dan Engelstad	Southern Vermont	1	0–0	0–0	0
Robert Morris	Andrew Toole	Robert Morris (asst.)	9	150–123	91–51	1
Sacred Heart	Anthony Latina	Sacred Heart (asst.)	6	55–101	35–53	0
St. Francis Brooklyn	Glenn Braica	St. John's (asst.)	9	115–136	77–65	0
Saint Francis (PA)	Rob Krimmel	Saint Francis (asst.)	7	79–108	53–53	0
Wagner	Bashir Mason	Wagner (asst.)	7	110–79	70–36	0

Notes:

- All records, appearances, titles, etc. are from time with current school only.
- Year at school includes 2018–19 season.
- Overall and NEC/NCAA records are from time at current school and are before the beginning of the 2018–19 season.
- Previous jobs are head coaching jobs unless otherwise noted.

== Preseason ==
=== Preseason coaches poll ===
Rank	Team
1.	Saint Francis (PA) (8)
2.	Fairleigh Dickinson (1)
3.	LIU Brooklyn (1)
4.	Wagner
5.	Robert Morris
6.	Central Connecticut
7.	St. Francis Brooklyn
8.	Bryant
9.	Sacred Heart
10.	Mount St. Mary's

() first place votes

=== Preseason All-NEC team ===
Recipient	School
Raiquan Clark	LIU Brooklyn
Keith Braxton	Saint Francis
Mike Holloway	Fairleigh Dickinson
Jamaal King	Saint Francis
Tyler Kohl	Central Connecticut

== NEC regular season ==
=== Conference matrix ===
This table summarizes the head-to-head results between teams in conference play. (x) indicates games remaining this season.

	Bryant	Central Conn.	Fairleigh Dickinson	LIU Br'klyn	Mount St. Mary's	Robert Morris	Sacred Heart	St. Francis Brooklyn	Saint Francis (PA)	Wagner
vs. Bryant	–	1–1	2–0	2–0	0–2	2–0	2–0	1–1	2–0	0–2
vs. Central Conn.	1–1	–	1–1	2–0	1–1	1–1	2–0	1–1	2–0	2–0
vs. Fairleigh Dickinson	0–2	1–1	–	1–1	0–2	1–1	1–1	0–2	1–1	1–1
vs. LIU Br'klyn	0–2	0–2	1–1	–	1–1	1–1	1–1	2–0	1–1	2–0
vs. Mount St. Mary's	2–0	1–1	2–0	1–1	–	1–1	1–1	1–1	2–0	1–1
vs. Robert Morris	0–2	1–1	1–1	1–1	1–1	–	1–1	0–2	2–0	0–2
vs. Sacred Heart	0–2	0–2	1–1	1–1	1–1	1–1	–	1–1	1–1	1–1
vs. St. Francis Brooklyn	1–1	1–1	2–0	0–2	1–1	2–0	1–1	–	1–1	0–2
vs. Saint Francis (PA)	1–1	0–2	1–1	1–1	0–2	0–2	1–1	1–1	–	1–1
vs. Wagner	2–0	0–2	1–1	0–2	1–1	2–0	1–1	2–0	1–1	–
Total	7–11	5–13	12–6	9–9	6–12	11–7	11–7	9–9	12–6	8–10

=== Player of the week ===
Throughout the regular season, the Northeast Conference offices named player(s) of the week and rookie(s) of the week.

Week	Player of the week	Rookie of the week
November 12, 2018	Tyler Kohl, CCSU	Koreem Ozier, SHU
November 19, 2018	Tyler Kohl (2), CCSU; Josh Williams, RMU	Ian Krishnan, CCSU
November 26, 2018	Darnell Edge, FDU	Nana Opuku, MSM
December 3, 2018	Keith Braxton, SFU	Cameron Parker, SHU
December 10, 2018	Raul Frias, LIU	Dee Barnes, MSM
December 17, 2018	Jalen Jordan, SFBK	Cameron Parker (2), SHU
December 24, 2018	Tyler Kohl (3), CCSU; Malik Jefferson, MSM	Joe Kasperzyk, BRY
December 31, 2018	Raiquan Clark, LIU	Joe Kasperzyk (2), BRY; Vado Morse, MSM
January 7, 2019	E. J. Anosike, SHU	Vado Morse (2), MSM
January 14, 2019	Tyler Kohl (4), CCSU; Romone Saunders, WAG	Joe Kasperzyk (3), BRY; Ian Krishnan (2), CCSU
January 21, 2019	Jalen Jordan (2), SFBK	Vado Morse (3), MSM
January 28, 2019	Keith Braxton (2), SFU	Vado Morse (4), MSM
February 4, 2019	Tyler Kohl (5), CCSU	Malik Jefferson, MSM
February 11, 2019	Tyler Kohl (6), CCSU	Vado Morse (5), MSM
February 18, 2019	Glenn Sanabria, SFBK; Keith Braxton (2), SFU	Vado Morse (6), MSM
February 25, 2019	Mike Holloway Jr., FDU	Damian Chong Qui, MSM

== Postseason ==
=== NEC tournament ===
Teams are reseeded after each round with highest remaining seeds receiving home court advantage.

Quarterfinals; Wednesday, March 6, 2019; NEC Front Row
1	Saint Francis (PA)	67
8	Bryant	63
4	Robert Morris	69^{OT}
5	St. Francis Brooklyn	65
(Pairings are reseeded after the first round)
2	Fairleigh Dickinson	84
7	Wagner	46
3	Sacred Heart	62
6	LIU Brooklyn	71

Semifinals; Saturday, March 9, 2019; ESPN3/NEC Front Row
1	Saint Francis (PA)	72
6	LIU Brooklyn	64
2	Fairleigh Dickinson	66
4	Robert Morris	62

Championship; Tuesday, March 12, 2019; ESPN2
1	Saint Francis (PA)	76
2	Fairleigh Dickinson	85

=== NCAA tournament ===
Seed	Region	School	First Four	1st round	2nd round	Sweet 16	Elite Eight	Final Four	Championship
16	West	Fairleigh Dickinson	82–76 vs. (#16) Prairie View A&M – (Dayton, OH)	49-87 vs. (#1) Gonzaga – (Salt Lake City, UT)					

=== National Invitational Tournament ===
Seed	School	1st round	2nd round	Quarterfinals	Semifinals	Championship
8	Saint Francis (PA)	72–89 at. (#1) Indiana – (Bloomington, IN)				

=== CollegeInsider.com Postseason Tournament ===
School	1st round	2nd round	Quarterfinals	Semifinals	Championship
St. Francis Brooklyn	72–81 at. Hampton – (Hampton, VA)				
Robert Morris	98–89^{OT} vs. Cornell – (Moon Township, PA)	70–77 vs. Presbyterian – (Moon Township, PA)			

== All-NEC honors and awards ==
Following the regular season, the conference selected outstanding performers based on a poll of league coaches.

Honor	Recipient
Player of the Year	Keith Braxton, SFPA
Coach of the Year	Rob Krimmel, SFPA
Defensive Player of the Year	Jare'l Spellman, SHU
Rookie of the Year	Vado Morse, MSM
Most Improved Player of the Year	E.J. Anosike, SHU
All-NEC First Team	Keith Braxton, SFPA
All-NEC First Team	Raiquan Clark, LIU
All-NEC First Team	Darnell Edge, FDU
All-NEC First Team	Sean Hoehn, SHU
All-NEC First Team	Jamaal King, SFPA
All-NEC Second Team	E.J. Anosike, SHU
All-NEC Second Team	Jalen Jordan, SFBK
All-NEC Second Team	Romone Saunders, WC
All-NEC Second Team	Mike Holloway Jr., FDU
All-NEC Second Team	Tyler Kohl, CCSU
All-NEC Third Team	Ty Flowers, LIU
All-NEC Third Team	Glenn Sanabria, SFBK
All-NEC Third Team	Adam Grant, BRY
All-NEC Third Team	Sabastian Townes, BRY
All-NEC Third Team	Josh Williams, RMU
All-NEC Rookie Team	Joe Kasperzyk, BRY
All-NEC Rookie Team	Ian Krishnan, CCSU
All-NEC Rookie Team	Vado Morse, MSM
All-NEC Rookie Team	Koreem Ozier, SHU
All-NEC Rookie Team	Cameron Parker, SHU

== See also ==
- 2018–19 Northeast Conference women's basketball season
