= Harcum College =

Private college in Bryn Mawr, Pennsylvania, US

- Former name: Harcum Post Graduate School
- Motto: Gesta verbis praevenient (Latin)
- Motto in English: "Deeds before words"
- Type: Private associate degree-granting college
- Established: 1915
- President: Jon Jay DeTemple
- Students: 904
- Location: Bryn Mawr, Pennsylvania, U.S. 40.0223°N 75.3137°W
- Campus: Suburban, 14 acres (0.057 km^{2})
- Colors: Purple & white
- Nickname: Bears
- Sporting affiliations: NJCAA Division I
- Website: www.harcum.edu

Harcum College is a private associate degree-granting college in Bryn Mawr, Pennsylvania. It was founded in 1915 and was the first two-year college in Pennsylvania authorized to grant associate degrees.

== History ==
The Harcum Post Graduate School was opened on October 1, 1915, by Edith Harcum and Octavius Harcum. Edith's goal was to "start a school where the individual talent of each girl would be treated as an integral part of her education." A concert pianist, Edith sought to pursue a venture that would combine the shared interests of both her and Octavius, her husband.

Harcum was originally an all-women's university preparatory school. Octavius Harcum was the first President of the school until his death in 1920. Upon his death, Edith assumed the Presidency, remaining in that post for more than 30 years. In the late 1920s, Harcum eliminated the preparatory school model, fully moving into a junior college. In 1952, Edith Harcum declared bankruptcy, selling the school's assets to Philip Klein, a local businessman. In 1956, Pennsylvania granted Harcum permission to be the first junior college in the Commonwealth's history to confer the Associate of Arts and the Associate of Science degrees. Harcum began to admit male students during the 1970s, and became officially co-educational in 2003.

Today, Harcum serves traditional and non-traditional students interested in Allied Health Science, Business and Human Services, with both a commuter and residential experience. Henry Klein served on Harcum's board of trustees for more than 50 years, holding the record for the longest serving board member at any university or college in the United States of America.

== Academics ==
Harcum College offers over 20 degree programs in fields like Allied Health Science, Business, Human Services, Design, and Education. Non-credit courses, certificate programs, and professional development programs are offered through the Office of Continuing Studies. Courses are offered at Harcum's Bryn Mawr campus, at partnership sites, and online.

As of 2023, the graduation rate was 50% and the retention rate for first-year students was 55%.

Harcum College hosts the Cohen Dental Center, a 16-chair clinical facility which houses the Dental Clinic, Dental Laboratory, and classrooms. Approximately 1,400 patients per year are treated per year by students enrolled in dental programs at the college.

== Campus ==
Harcum College is in the Bryn Mawr census-designated place within the municipality of Lower Merion Township. The campus is on the Philadelphia Main Line, and is located adjacent to the Bryn Mawr Train Station, operated by SEPTA. The Bryn Mawr Train Station connects Harcum students with transportation to and from Philadelphia through the Paoli/Thorndale Line.

The main campus buildings are located along Montgomery Avenue. including the historic Melville Hall, Klein Hall, Bedford Hall, The Academic Center (which includes Harcum's Library), historic Richter Hall and Pennswood Hall — the college's main residence hall.

Melville Hall at Harcum College.

A Veterinary Services building houses the Animal Care Facility, which services the AVMA accredited Veterinary Technology program.

The Harcum Music School was founded in 1985 when Medley Music of Bryn Mawr transferred ownership of their teaching division to Harcum College. The school officially moved to Harcum's Bryn Mawr campus in 1990. The Harcum Music School is open to Harcum students as well as community members who wish to learn a musical instrument, take intermediate or advanced lessons, collaborate with other musicians, or play in front of a live audience.

The Kevin D. Marlo Little Theatre—named after Kevin D. Marlo, son of Harcum Trustee Dennis Marlo and an aspiring actor and who was killed during the September 11th attacks on the World Trade Center—is an historic theatre that was restored and revived in 2011 in an effort to reconnect students and community to the arts.

Harcum College is located within 15 miles (24km) of Villanova University, Bryn Mawr College, Haverford College, Saint Joseph's University, Eastern University, La Salle University, Rosemont College, Thomas Jefferson University, and Swarthmore College.

== Athletics ==
Harcum College is home to the Bears, the college's athletics team. Harcum's school colors are purple and white. Harcum competes in NJCAA Region 19, and the college's athletic teams are members of the National Junior College Athletic Association.

Harcum offers both men and women's basketball, soccer, cross country, track & field, and volleyball teams. A women's only flag-football team also is hosted by the college.

The college's official mascot is "Hatcher the Bear", named after founder Edith Hatcher Harcum.
