= North Athletic Complex =

Sports venue in Pittsburgh, Pennsylvania

Coordinates: 40.519083°N 80.212405°W

- Interactive map of North Athletic Complex
- Location: Pittsburgh, PA, United States
- Owner: Robert Morris Colonials
- Operator: Robert Morris Colonials
- Capacity: 500
- Surface: Natural grass

Construction
- Opened: 1998

Tenant
- Robert Morris Colonials (NCAA)

The North Athletic Complex is a softball, soccer, and basketball venue in Pittsburgh, Pennsylvania, United States. It is home to the Robert Morris Colonials softball and soccer teams of the NCAA Division I Northeast Conference. The venue has a capacity of 500. In 2018–19, Robert Morris's men's basketball team had to use this as their home arena while the UPMC Events Center was being constructed.

The student recreation and fitness center is also located at the North Athletic Complex.
