= 2019–20 Georgetown Hoyas men's basketball team =

American college basketball season

2019–20 Georgetown Hoyas men's basketball
- Conference: Big East
- Record: 15–17 (5–13 Big East)
- Head coach: Patrick Ewing (3rd season)
- Assistant coaches: Louis Orr; Robert Kirby; Akbar Waheed
- Captain: No captain
- Home arena: Capital One Arena

2019–20 Big East men's basketball standings
	Conf.				Overall
Team	W		L	PCT	W		L	PCT
No. 7 Creighton	13	–	5	.722	24	–	7	.774
No. 10 Villanova	13	–	5	.722	24	–	7	.774
No. 15 Seton Hall	13	–	5	.722	21	–	9	.700
Providence	12	–	6	.667	19	–	12	.613
No. 23 Butler	10	–	8	.556	22	–	9	.710
Marquette	8	–	10	.444	18	–	12	.600
Xavier	8	–	10	.444	19	–	13	.594
Georgetown	5	–	13	.278	15	–	17	.469
St. John's	5	–	13	.278	17	–	15	.531
DePaul	3	–	15	.167	16	–	16	.500
Note: The 2020 Big East tournament was cancelled at halftime of the first game of the quarterfinals due to the COVID-19 pandemic. Rankings from AP poll

The 2019–20 Georgetown Hoyas men's basketball team represented Georgetown University in the 2019–20 NCAA Division I men's basketball season. The Hoyas, led by third-year head coach Patrick Ewing, played their home games at the Capital One Arena in Washington, D.C., as members of the Big East Conference. They lost to St. John's in the first round of the 2020 Big East men's basketball tournament, finished with a record of 15–17 overall and 5–13 in Big East play, and had no postseason play.

== Previous season ==
The Hoyas finished the 2018–19 season at 19–14, 9–9 in Big East play, to finish in sixth place in the conference. As the No. 6 seed in the Big East tournament, they lost in the first round to Seton Hall. Invited to the National Invitation Tournament, they lost in the first round to Harvard. Georgetown finished the season with a winning record, a non-losing conference record, and an invitation to a postseason tournament, all for the first time since 2014–15.

== Offseason ==
=== Departures ===
Name	Number	Pos.	Height	Weight	Year	Hometown	Reason
Antwan Walker	5	F	6'9"	230	Sophomore	Washington, D.C.	Dismissed from team; transferred to Rhode Island
Greg Malinowski	11	G	6'5"	215	RS Senior	Chantilly, VA	Graduated
Jessie Govan	15	C	6'10"	270	Senior	Queens Village, NY	Graduated
Kaleb Johnson	32	G/F	6'6"	205	Senior	South Hill, VA	Graduated
Trey Mourning	33	F	6'8"	200	RS Senior	Miami, FL	Graduated
Grayson Carter	35	F	6'8"	200	Freshman	Dallas, TX	Transferred to UT Arlington

=== Incoming transfers ===
Name	Number	Pos.	Height	Weight	Year	Hometown	Previous school
Galen Alexander	11	F	6'6"	227	Junior	Breaux Bridge, LA	Jones County Junior College
Terrell Allen	12	G	6'3"	180	Grad	Upper Marlboro, MD	UCF

=== 2019 recruiting class ===
College recruiting information
Name	Hometown	School	Height	Weight	Commit date
Timothy Ighoefe; C	Lagos, Nigeria	NBA Academy Africa	6 ft 11 in (2.11 m)	240 lb (110 kg)	Sep 7, 2018
Timothy Ighoefe; C	Recruit ratings: Rivals: 247Sports: (NR)				
Malcolm Wilson; C	Columbia, SC	Ridge View High School	6 ft 10 in (2.08 m)	205 lb (93 kg)	Sep 25, 2018
Malcolm Wilson; C	Recruit ratings: Scout: Rivals: 247Sports: (80)				
Qudus Wahab; C	Ashburn, VA	Flint Hill Prep (VA)	6 ft 10 in (2.08 m)	230 lb (100 kg)	Jan 30, 2019
Qudus Wahab; C	Recruit ratings: Scout: Rivals: 247Sports: (82)				
Myron Gardner; F	Geneva, OH	SPIRE Academy (OH)	6 ft 6 in (1.98 m)	190 lb (86 kg)	Apr 25, 2019
Myron Gardner; F	Recruit ratings: Rivals: 247Sports: (81)				
Overall recruit ranking: Rivals: 89 (tie) ESPN: 55
Note: In many cases, Scout, Rivals, 247Sports, On3, and ESPN may conflict in their listings of height and weight.; In these cases, the average was taken. ESPN grades are on a 100-point scale.; Sources: "2019 Team Ranking". Rivals.

== Roster ==
2019–20 Georgetown Hoyas men's basketball team
Players
Coaches

Pos.	#	Name	Height	Weight	Year	Previous school	Hometown
G	0	Jahvon Blair	6 ft 4 in (1.93 m)	190 lb (86 kg)	Jr	Orangeburg Prep	Mono, ON
G/F	1	Jamorko Pickett	6 ft 8 in (2.03 m)	206 lb (93 kg)	Jr	Massanutten Military Academy	Washington, DC
G	2	Mac McClung	6 ft 2 in (1.88 m)	186 lb (84 kg)	So	Gate City HS	Gate City, VA
G	3	James Akinjo	6 ft 0 in (1.83 m)	160 lb (73 kg)	So	Salesian College Preparatory	Richmond, California
G	4	Jagan Mosely	6 ft 3 in (1.91 m)	215 lb (98 kg)	Sr	St. Anthony's HS	Morganville, NJ
C	5	Timothy Ighoefe	6 ft 11 in (2.11 m)	250 lb (113 kg)	Fr	NBA Academy Africa	Lagos, Nigeria
G	10	Chuma Azinge (W)	6 ft 3 in (1.91 m)	183 lb (83 kg)	Fr	Choate Rosemary Hall	San Marino, CA
F	11	Galen Alexander	6 ft 6 in (1.98 m)	227 lb (103 kg)	Jr	Jones County JC	Breaux Bridge, LA
G	12	Terrell Allen	6 ft 3 in (1.91 m)	180 lb (82 kg)	GS	UCF	Upper Marlboro, MD
F	15	Myron Gardner	6 ft 6 in (1.98 m)	222 lb (101 kg)	Fr	SPIRE Academy (OH)	Detroit, MI
F	20	George Muresan (W)	6 ft 9 in (2.06 m)	218 lb (99 kg)	Sr	St. Andrew's Episcopal School	Potomac, MD
G	22	Jaden Robinson (W)	6 ft 3 in (1.91 m)	185 lb (84 kg)	So	Mount Saint Joseph HS	Baltimore, MD
F	23	Josh LeBlanc	6 ft 7 in (2.01 m)	213 lb (97 kg)	So	Madison Preparatory Academy	Baton Rouge, Louisiana
C	32	Malcolm Wilson (injured) (redshirt)	6 ft 11 in (2.11 m)	205 lb (93 kg)	Fr	Ridge View HS	Columbia, SC
C	34	Qudus Wahab	6 ft 11 in (2.11 m)	237 lb (108 kg)	Fr	Flint Hill Prep (VA)	Ashburn, VA
C	44	Ömer Yurtseven	7 ft 0 in (2.13 m)	264 lb (120 kg)	RS Jr	NC State	Istanbul, Turkey

Head coach

- Patrick Ewing (Georgetown)

Assistant coach(es)

- Louis Orr (Syracuse)
- Robert Kirby (UTRGV)
- Akbar Waheed (Niagara)

Legend

- (C) Team captain
- (S) Suspended
- (I) Ineligible
- (W) Walk-on
- Injured
- Current redshirt

Roster
Last update: March 19, 2020

Notes: 1) Chuma Azinge was a recruited walk-on. 2) On December 2, 2019, Patrick Ewing announced that James Akinjo and Josh LeBlanc were no longer a part of the team and would transfer. 3) On December 13, 2019, Galen Alexander and Myron Gardner announced that they had left the team and would transfer.

== Season recap ==
In addition to sophomore forward Antwan Walker – dismissed from the team in October 2018, he subsequently had transferred to Rhode Island – Georgetown had lost five players since the conclusion of the previous season: guard Greg Malinowski, guard/forward Kaleb Johnson, forward Trey Mourning, and center Jessie Govan all had graduated in 2019, and freshman forward Grayson Carter had transferred to UT Arlington in search of greater playing time after a single season as a Hoya. However, a core of veteran players – sophomore James Akinjo at point guard, senior Jagan Mosely, junior Jahvon Blair, and sophomore Mac McClung at guard, and junior Jamorko Pickett and sophomore Josh LeBlanc at forward — returned. Senior forward George Muresan, the son of former NBA player Gheorghe Muresan, made the team as a walk-on for the fourth straight season. Sophomore guard Jaden Robinson also returned, making the team as a walk-on for the second straight year.

An addition for 2019–2020 was center Ömer Yurtseven, a transfer from North Carolina State who joined the team as a redshirt junior after sitting out the previous season in accordance with NCAA transfer rules. Also arriving were guard Terrell Allen, a graduate transfer from Central Florida who had spent a season at Drexel before two years at UCF, and junior small forward Galen Alexander; recruited out of high school, Alexander had signed with LSU, was dismissed from the team there without ever playing a game amid allegations that he had fired paintballs at other students, and subsequently spent two years at Jones County Junior College. Five freshmen — centers Timothy Ighoefe, Qudus Wahab, and Malcolm Wilson, forward Myron Gardner, and recruited walk-on Chuma Azinge, a guard — rounded out the team.

There were nine returning players from the previous season including four of that year's five starters, freshman standouts Akinjo, LeBlanc, and McClung among them, as well as Yurtseven, replacing the departed Govan and Alexander.

=== 2019 Bahamas Foreign Tour ===
Under National Collegiate Athletic Association (NCAA) rules, the Hoyas were allowed to make an overseas preseason trip to play exhibition games against foreign teams once every four years, and the 2019–2020 team followed up recent trips to China in August 2011 and Italy in August 2015 with a trip to the Bahamas — dubbed the "2019 Bahamas Foreign Tour" — from August 10 to 17. The Hoyas held 10 team practices prior to the tour, the number permitted before an overseas tour by NCAA rules. Before departing, the team characterized the Bahamas visit as a "business trip;" Patrick Ewing said that he wanted to use the trip to test different line-ups and gain insight into which of his players were sharing the ball and playing as a team, while James Akinjo and Mac McClung both expressed a desire to get to know their new teammates and learn how best to work together with them on the court, Josh LeBlanc said he wanted to focus on ball-sharing and team play, and Ömer Yurtseven planned to use the Bahamas games to get back into his competitive basketball routine after sitting out the 2018–2019 season.

During the Bahamas tour, Georgetown played three exhibition games against local professional and international teams as part of the "Bahamas Basketball Federation (BBF) Summer of Thunder 2019" event. The games took place at Kendal G. L. Isaacs National Gymnasium at Atlantis Paradise Island in Nassau using International Basketball Federation (Fédération Internationale de Basketball or FIBA) rules which included the new NCAA three-point arc distance of 22 feet 1 3/4 inches (6.750 meters), a 24-second shot clock, a FIBA-compliant basketball that differed from the regulation NCAA ball, and games divided into four 10-minute quarters with five-minute overtime periods. There were no overtime periods as the Hoyas won all three games by wide margins, scoring at least 91 points in each game and twice scoring over 100 points. While in Nassau, the Hoyas also hosted a youth basketball clinic attended by 50 Bahamian children, met with Chargé d'Affaires Stephanie Bowers of the United States Embassy, and attended a luncheon with Georgetown fans who had traveled to the Bahamas to see the games.

=== Nonconference schedule ===
In October, the Big East's coaches picked Georgetown to finish sixth in the 10-team conference in their annual preseason poll. Akinjo — who the previous season had become the seventh Hoya to be selected as Big East Freshman of the Year — was selected to the Preseason All-Big East Second Team, and Yurtseven — who had averaged 13.5 points and 6.7 rebounds per game during his last season of play in 2017–2018 with North Carolina State — won Preseason All-Big East Honorable Mention. In a preseason evaluation of the Big East for 2019–2020, Sports Illustrated picked the Hoyas to finish fifth in the Big East and identified the Georgetown squad as a solid mid-tier team in the conference with the potential to make a surprise run at the conference championship.

The Hoyas opened the season on November 6 at Capital One Arena by shooting only 30 percent from the field against Mount St. Mary's in the first half, falling behind 37–25 at halftime. In the second half they shot 65.6 percent and finished with a 20–1 run, winning 81–68. Ömer Yursteven had a double-double in his Georgetown debut with 20 points on 7–for–9 shooting and 12 rebounds, while James Akinjo also finished with 20 points and Mac McClung scored 16. Georgetown then began play in the Empire Classic, meeting Central Arkansas in an unbracketed game at Capital One Arena and defeating the Bears behind another Yurtseven double-double (17 points and 15 rebounds), 13 points by Jagan Moseley, and 10 by Jamorko Pickett.

Georgetown made its fourth appearance in five seasons in the Gavitt Tipoff Games, an annual series of meetings between Big East and Big Ten Conference teams begun in 2015. In the 2019 edition, the Hoyas faced Penn State at Capital One Arena. Georgetown had won the past six meetings between the schools and had not lost at home to Penn State since 1972; their first loss of the season was to the Nittany Lions. With McClung shooting just 1-for-7 from the field — following a 1-for-10 performance against Central Arkansas five days earlier — and Nittany Lions sophomore guard Myreon Jones scoring a game-high and career-high 21 points, the Hoyas fell behind early by as many as 18 points and lost by 15, dropping their season record to 2–1, their Gavit Tipoff Games all-time record to 1–3, and their record against Power Five teams during Patrick Ewing's tenure to 1–3. Yurtseven had his third straight double-double with 16 points and 10 rebounds, and Akinjo added 13 points in a losing cause.

Georgetown completed its season-opening four-game homestand by returning to action in the Empire Classic, hosting Georgia State in another unbracketed game, and the Hoyas won with a game-high 25 points, going 11-for-11 from the foul line, while Yurtseven continued his string of double-doubles with 15 points and 13 rebounds, Josh LeBlanc scored 12 points, Akinjo added 11, and Jamorko Pickett finished with 10. The Hoyas then traveled to Madison Square Garden in New York City to begin the bracketed portion of the Empire Classic with a meeting in the semifinals with their first ranked opponent of the season, No. 22 Texas. The crowd — which included former Georgetown and National Basketball Association great Alonzo Mourning and Brooklyn Nets centers Jarrett Allen and Kevin Durant — welcomed former New York Knicks star Ewing back to Madison Square Garden, his home court for most of his professional playing career, by chanting its support both for Georgetown and for Ewing, who told the press post-game, "It felt like back in my Knick days." Georgetown trailed 42–37 at halftime and 52–50 with 13:42 left to play, but then the Hoyas went on a 12–0 run — including a dunk by Qudus Wahab that gave Georgetown its first lead of the second half at 54–52 — to take a 62–52 lead with 9:49 remaining on the way to an upset 82–66 win. McClung scored 19 points, Jamorko Pickett added 15, James Akinjo finished with 14, and Yurtseven — whose double-double streak finally ended — had 10. The Hoyas held Texas to 37 percent shooting from the field and forced the Longhorns to commit 12 turnovers. During the second half, Georgetown outshot Texas from the field 57.7 to 22.2 percent and converted a 19-11 first-half rebounding deficit into a 34–28 rebounding advantage by game's end. It was Georgetown's third win over a Top 25 team during Ewing's tenure as head coach.

The following evening, Georgetown advanced to the Empire Classic championship game to face No. 1 Duke. It was the first collegiate meeting between Ewing and Duke head coach Mike Krzyzewski. With a boisterous crowd again cheering Ewing and Georgetown, the Hoyas outrebounded the Blue Devils and played a good transition game, pulling out to an early lead of 9–2 and then countering Duke comeback runs with scoring runs of their own to post leads of 22–12 and then 29–18, their largest of the game, with 6:11 left in the first half. They did not score a field goal during the final six minutes of the first half, however, and the Blue Devils came back to tie the game 33–33 at halftime. Seven seconds into the second half, Duke broke the tie to take a lead it never relinquished; although the Hoyas outshot the Blue Devils from the field 50.9 to 41.5 percent for the game, two Duke guards — sophomore Tre Jones and freshman Cassius Stanley, who together had scored only three points before halftime — combined for 31 second-half points. Ewing, incensed at what he felt were a number of erroneous foul calls against his players, limiting playing time for McClung and Yurtseven, stormed onto the court to protest halfway through the second half and was called for a technical foul, and Duke went on to win, 81–73. Yurtseven, who had taken no shots in the first half, scored 21 points after halftime to lead Georgetown scoring for the game, while the only other Hoya to score in double figures, James Akinjo, finished with 19 points. The win was Krzyzewski's 1,138th as a head coach and a record 218th win for him (against 34 losses) in games in which Duke was ranked No. 1, exceeding the 217-win record of John Wooden, who was 217–11 while UCLA was No. 1.

Georgetown suffered a setback eight days later when they finished November with an upset loss at home at the hands of UNC Greensboro in which James Akinjo scored 12 points, Yurtseven narrowly missed a double-double with 10 points and nine rebounds, and Jamorko Pickett finished with eight rebounds. Georgetown's record dropped to 4–3. On December 2 Ewing announced that both James Akinjo and Josh LeBlanc would not play for Georgetown again and would transfer. On the same day, news broke that a Georgetown student and her roommate had filed restraining orders against LeBlanc, Galen Alexander, and Myron Gardner on November 5 and 12, alleging "sexual harassment and assault" by Gardner on September 15, a burglary of their apartment by LeBlanc, Alexander, and Gardner on September 16, and subsequent threats of bodily harm against both women by LeBlanc during the week following the alleged burglary, and that campus police and the Metropolitan Police Department of the District of Columbia were investigating the allegations; Akinjo was not implicated in any of the complaints. Alexander and Gardner remained with the team, but Georgetown lost two of its top five scorers, one of them its starting point guard. "Last year, they were part of the heart and soul of our team," Ewing said two days later.

With a depleted roster, Georgetown made a road trip to play Oklahoma State and SMU. In the Oklahoma State game — part of the first edition of the annual Big East-Big 12 Battle, which pitted Big East schools against those of the Big 12 Conference — Terrell Allen took over as starting point guard and the Hoyas won despite 29 points, six rebounds, and six assists by Cowboys senior guard Lindy Waters III. The Hoyas built an early lead, lost it early in the second half, but came from behind for the with a season-high 33 points by Mac McClung — Ewing called it "one of his best games as a Hoya" — 19 points and nine rebounds by Ömer Yurtseven, a season-high 15 points and five assists by Allen, and a 43–29 team rebounding performance, including 25–7 in the second half. Three nights later against undefeated SMU — the final game of a home-and-home series between the schools begun the previous season — Jahvon Blair came off the bench to tie his career high with 21 points, McClung contributed 19 points and seven assists, Yurtseven also scored 19, and Jamorko Pickett added 11 as Georgetown improved its record to 6–3 with a second consecutive win. Galen Alexander and Myron Gardner played in both games, but on December 13 both of them announced their departure from the team and intention to transfer from Georgetown, Alexander blaming Georgetown for failing to support him against what he claimed were false charges against him in the alleged burglary case. The loss of Alexander and Gardner left the team extremely shorthanded for the season, with only nine scholarship players remaining on the roster. Ewing told his remaining players that the team still had the talent to put together a successful season, but for the remainder of the season he was forced to play his remaining starters for long stretches with very little rest during games and give walk-ons greater playing team when turning to his depleted bench.

The annual game the previous year between Georgetown and Syracuse — longtime rivals in the original Big East Conference of 1979–2013 — had ended amid speculation that the schools would not play again in the near future because the Atlantic Coast Conference's decision to go to a 20-game conference schedule in 2019–2020 would make it too difficult for the Orange to schedule Georgetown. However, the teams continued the series ans, a week after defeating SMU and the day after Alexander and Gardner departed, Georgetown concluded the non-conference portion of their season with a four-game homestand at Capital One Arena that opened against Syracuse. It was the 95th meeting of the schools and the 80th called by Georgetown radio broadcaster Rich Chvotkin, and it drew Georgetown's biggest home crowd of the season, including Washington Nationals starting pitcher Max Scherzer. Displeased with the officiating, the Syracuse bench was assessed a technical foul when it protested a blocking foul called against the Orange midway through the first half, and late in the second half injured Syracuse sophomore guard Jalen Carey was ejected from the game for tripping Terrell Allen while Allen was playing near the Orange's bench. Georgetown committed 14 fouls to Syracuse's 24 and shot 31 free throws to Syracuse's nine; they also outperformed Syracuse 14–5 in offensive rebounds and 16–5 in second-chance points, and although Syracuse sophomore guard Buddy Boeheim scored 25 points, Georgetown won 89–79 in Ewing's first coaching victory over Syracuse. Playing 35 minutes 45 seconds, Mac McClung scored 26 points and Ömer Yurtseven contributed 19 points and nine rebounds in 34 minutes, while Jagan Moseley finished with 16 points in 36:46 of play and Terrell Allen with 14 in 37:35. With Georgetown's bench depleted, walk-on George Muresan came in to play for six minutes. While Georgetown improved to 7–3, Syracuse dropped to 5–5 on the season, its worst 10-game start in head coach Jim Boeheim's 44 years as head coach. After the game, Boeheim told the press that he thought that the departure of Akinjo, LeBlanc, Alexander, and Gardner actually had improved the Georgetown team, saying that Akinjo "wouldn't pass the ball to anybody and just shot it every time...They've got seven guys who are as good as anybody's, and two guys [who left the team] weren't really contributing at all and another guy [Akinjo] was just throwing the ball up all the time."

Georgetown finished both its non-conference schedule for the year and its homestand with games against UMBC, Samford, and American, defeating all three by 20 points or more. Against UMBC, Yurtseven had a double-double with 22 points — a season high — and 13 rebounds, shooting 11-for-14 (78.6 percent) from the field and blocking three shots, while Jamorko Pickett scored 15, Jahvon Blair came off the bench to score 12, and Qudus Wahab backed up Yursteven at center by narrowly missing a double-double with 10 points and nine rebounds, both career highs for him. In the Samford game, Yurtseven had another double-double, with 32 points and 17 rebounds — both career highs — while Mac McClung scored 25 points and had five assists and a career-high seven rebounds, Jamorko Pickett added 14 points and six rebounds, Jahvon Blair finished with 11 points and six rebounds, and Terrell Allen had seven assists. A week later against American, Yurtseven scored 17 points and grabbed eight rebounds, while Jahvon Blair finished with 14 points and six rebounds, Terrell Allen added 14 points and five assists, and Jamorko Pickett had nine points and seven rebounds. American senior guard Sa'eed Nelson accidentally poked Mac McClung in the eye late in the first half, forcing McClung to miss the rest of the game.

Georgetown finished non-conference play having overcome the loss of four players to win all six games they had played since the departure of Akinjo and LeBlanc, posting a record of 10–3 against non-conference opponents for the second season in a row, and defeating three opponents from the Power Five conferences. However, the non-conference portion of the season ended amid concerns that Georgetown's lack of depth after December's scandals and transfers would hurt the team in Big East play.

=== Conference schedule ===
Georgetown opened its Big East conference schedule on the road with a New Year's Eve game at Providence. Still nursing his injured eye, Mac McClung missed the game. In the first half the Friars held the Hoyas to the fewest points they had scored in a half all season and jumping out to a 54-23 halftime lead. After halftime Georgetown held Providence to 22 second-half points, tying the Friars' season low in a half, but their six-game winning streak came to an end with a 76–60 loss to the Friars. Ömer Yurtseven had a double-double with 14 points and 10 rebounds, and Terrell Allen and Jahvon Blair each scored 10 points. Another loss followed at Seton Hall three days later in the first game of 2020, when the Pirates pulled out to a double-digit lead with seven minutes left in the first half, increased it to 17 points at halftime, and never let the Hoyas get closer than 11 points in the second half, rolling to a 78–62 win. With just over three minutes to play, McClung — who had returned to action after missing the conference opener — and Pirates redshirt senior guard Quincy McKnight exchanged words, leading to a pushing and shoving match among several players that resulted in the officials assessing technical fouls on McClung and McKnight and ejecting from the game four Hoyas and two Pirates who had left their respective benches to join the fracas. McClung finished with 20 points, and Jamorko Pickett just missed a double-double with 10 points and nine rebounds. The loss dropped Georgetown to 10–5 overall and 0–2 in Big East play.

On January 8, Georgetown played its conference home opener, facing St. John's at Capital One Arena. This time, the Hoyas had a dominating first half in which Mac McClung scored 21 points and Georgetown jumped out to a double-digit lead with 14:05 to play in the half and led 53–26 at halftime on the way to an 87–66 victory. McClung finished with 24 points, Jamorko Pickett and Ömer Yurtseven both had a double-doubles — Pickett with 18 points and 11 rebounds as well as four blocked shots and Yurtseven with 10 points and 11 rebounds — Terrell Allen added 16 points and five steals, and Jagan Mosely contributed 12 points, six rebounds, and seven assists. The Hoyas then went on the road again to meet their first ranked conference opponent of the year, No. 16 Villanova, in a game played at the Wells Fargo Center in Philadelphia. The Wildcats made 10 three-pointers in their first 12 baskets, and, although Georgetown shot 50 percent from the field to keep the first half close, Villanova led 39–36 at halftime. By the time the Wildcats pulled out to a 56–49 lead in the second half, Villanova sophomore forward Saddiq Bey — never before noted for any particular three-point prowess — was having a career game, carrying his team by going 9-for-12 (75 percent) from the floor, including seven three-pointers, while the rest of the Wildcats had shot a combined 9-for-30 (30 percent). Bey finished shooting 10-for-15 (66.7 percent) from the field — including 8-for-10 from three-point range — and sinking five free throws to score a career-high 33 points. In contrast, the Hoyas as a team shot only 5-for-16 (31.3 percent) from beyond the arc, and Villanova prevailed 80–66, the Wildcats' eighth win in nine games. Qudus Wahab came off the bench to lead the Hoyas with 13 points, while Jamorko Pickett finished with 12 and Ömer Yurtseven and Terrell Allen each scored 10. The Hoyas fell to 11–6 on the season and a 1–3 start in conference play.

Georgetown returned to Washington for a two-game homestand that began with a game against another ranked team, No. 25 Creighton. Mac McClung and Terrell Allen both were ill and had not practiced in three days, but both nonetheless played. The Hoyas shot 51.7 percent from the field for the game and 18-for-32 (56.3 percent) in the second half, and they out-rebounded the Bluejays 41–29. Creighton, however, dominated in three-point shooting, connecting on 13 of 32 shots (40.6 percent) from three-point range while the Hoyas sank just five of 15 shots (33.3 percent) from beyond the arc. Creighton clung to a 37–36 lead at halftime and increased its lead to 45–40 with 17:08 remaining in the game, but the Hoyas then went on an 13–2 scoring run to take a 53–47 lead with 13:02 left to play. Georgetown held the lead for the rest of the game — although Creighton used an 8–0 run of its own to close to 70–69 with 3:49 left — and upset the Bluejays 83–80. Ömer Yurtseven finished with 20 points and 13 rebounds for his ninth double-double of the season and second in Big East play, giving him team-leading season averages of 16.5 points and 9.7 rebounds per game. Mac McClung scored 19 points, Jagan Mosely — who played the entire 40 minutes of the game — finished with 13, and Jahvon Blair came off the bench to add 12. Terrell Allen, who collapsed with an attack of nausea with 19 seconds left to play, scored 10 points. The victory snapped a five-game Georgetown losing streak against the Bluejays, and it was Ewing's first win over Creighton as head coach in five tries. Creighton lost for the first time in the 2019–2020 season in a game in which it scored 70 or more points. Georgetown was unable to develop any momentum off its win, however, losing its next two games, to Marquette at Capital One Arena — in a game in which Marquette senior guard Markus Howard scored 42 points — and at Xavier. Against Marquette, McClung scored 24 points and Yurtseven had another double-double (22 points and 11 rebounds), while Jamorko Pickett added 11 and Jagan Moseley 10. In the Xavier game, cold early shooting doomed the Hoyas: Georgetown started out shooting 3-for-16 (18.8 percent) from the field while Xavier built an early 23–8 lead, managed only 23 first-half points against the Musketeers, tying the season low in a half they had set against Providence on December 31, and scored fewer than 60 points for the first time all season. Georgetown's record against Xavier fell to 5–15 all time and to 3–11 in Big East play. Only Mac McClung scored in double figures against the Musketeers, finishing with 19 points.

The Hoyas finished January by hosting No. 16 Butler at Capital One Arena. Taking advantage of 12 first-half Bulldog turnovers and hitting 13 of 14 (92.9 percent) free throws, the Hoyas built a lead of as many as 13 points in the first half and went to the locker room at halftime with a 43–32 advantage. In the second half, however, Butler senior guard Kamar Baldwin led a Bulldog comeback, scoring 12 of his 13 points, and with 49.9 seconds left he fed the ball to redshirt senior guard Sean McDermott, who hit a three-pointer to give the Bulldogs the lead for good. Butler went on to win 69–64. Yurtseven had 14 points and 13 rebounds for yet another double-double, McClung finished with 12 points, Jagan Moseley added 11, and Qudus Wahab came off the bench to add 10 points and five rebounds, but the loss was Georgetown's sixth in eight games, and it dropped the Hoyas to 12–9 overall and 2–6 in the Big East.

Before the first game of February Georgetown's top scorer, Mac McClung, was reported to have suffered a foot injury during practice; after the season, his ailment was revealed as plantar fasciitis. At the time Georgetown announced McClung's injury, Ewing described McClung's availability as day-to-day, but McClung missed Georgetown's next game, a rematch with St. John's played at Madison Square Garden, and would make only one brief appearance in a game for the remainder of the season. In the St. John's game, the Hoyas broke their three-game losing streak and completed a regular-season sweep of the Red Storm, overcoming a 17-point deficit with 16 minutes to play to eke out a 73–72 victory. Jahvon Blair hit five three-pointers and finished with a career-high 23 points, Jagan Moseley scored 16, Ömer Yurtseven scored 13 and pulled down 15 rebounds for his twelfth double-double of the season overall and fifth against a Big East opponent, and Terrell Allen and Jamorko Pickett finished with 10 points each. Three days later in Washington, however, No. 12 Seton Hall opened the game with a 16–0 scoring run during which the Pirates made all four three-point shots they attempted, led 42–32 at halftime, and won for the ninth time in the last 11 meetings between the schools, Seton Hall senior guard Myles Powell scored 34 points on 12–for–24 shooting from the field, raising his per-game average against Georgetown to 29 points over five games. Yurtseven finished with his 13th double-double of the year (19 points and 15 rebounds), Jahvon Blair scored 18 points, and Terrell Allen added 11. Although the Hoyas hit 21 of 24 free throws, they shot only 38.3 percent from the field, and the Pirates blocked 11 of their shots.

The Hoyas next hosted DePaul and trailed by 11 points during the first half and six at halftime, but Jahvon Blair scored a career-high 30 points, Ömer Yurtseven contributed 16 and grabbed eight rebounds, Terrell Allen narrowly missed a double-double with 12 points and nine assists, Qudus Wahab came off the bench to block six shots, and Allen and walk-on George Muresan made clutch free throws in the final seconds and Georgetown came from behind for a win — but not before Yurtseven sprained his left ankle and left the game with 11 minutes to play. More shorthanded than ever with both McClung and Yurtseven unavailable and with its roster stretched to its limit, Georgetown visited No. 19 Butler a week later. Terrell Allen scored the first basket and seven of Georgetown's first 11 points as the Hoyas opened the game with an 11-2 scoring run. The Hoyas held their lead throughout the first half and were ahead 32–31 at halftime. The Bulldogs did not take a lead until early in the second half, and the two teams traded narrow leads as the half continued. With Georgetown clinging to a 61–60 lead with 3:46 left to play, Allen sank a jumper in the paint, then followed it with a three-pointer with 1:28 remaining to put the Hoyas ahead 66–60. Georgetown upset Butler 73–66, improving its all-time record at Hinkle Fieldhouse to 6–1. On 9-of-14 shooting from the field including 4-for-4 from three-point range, Allen tied his career high with 22 points; "He played one of the best games that I've seen him play, one of the best games since he's been here," Ewing said. Jahvon Blair scored 16, Jamorko Picket finished with 12, and Qudus Wahab, starting for the injured Yurtseven, added 11. The defeat of Butler gave the Hoyas three wins in four games despite the loss of McClung and Yurtseven. With a record of 15–10 overall and 5–7 in the Big East, Georgetown retained hopes that its non-conference wins over three Power Five teams, the tough game it gave No. 1 Duke in November, and its quality wins in conference play could return the Hoyas to the NCAA Tournament in 2020 for the first time since 2015. But the win over Butler was the last of Georgetown's season.

The season-ending losing streak began when Providence came to Capital One Arena on February 19. Georgetown led at halftime, but the Friars shot 60 percent in the second half and came from behind to win by 10 points, sweeping the Hoyas in the season series. Mac McClung, still nursing his injured foot, made his first appearance since January 28 and his last of the season, playing only eight minutes, scoring two points and grabbing a rebound. Jahvon Blair led the Hoyas with 20 points, Terrell Allen had 16 points, and Jamorko Pickett had a double-double with 12 points and 12 rebounds. Three days later, DePaul broke an eight-game losing streak by beating Georgetown in Chicago. After recovering from his left-ankle sprain, Ömer Yurtseven started against DePaul but left the court with 9:10 remaining in the first half after injuring his right ankle; he returned to action with 5:43 left until halftime, but favored the ankle for the rest of the game, playing 25 minutes, scoring five points, and pulling down eight rebounds. Terrell Allen had 21 points and eight rebounds, Jamorko Pickett 19 points and seven rebounds, and Jagan Mosely 13 points against DePaul. Another loss followed at Marquette, as the Golden Eagles led by 11 points at halftime and won by 21 points, sweeping the Hoyas for the season. Yurtseven was unable to play due to his new ankle injury — he would remain out of action until the Big East tournament — and the Hoyas again proved unable to contain Marquette senior guard Markus Howard, who scored 30 points against them. Jagan Mosely had 19 points and six rebounds, Jahvon Blair 15 points, and Jamorko Pickett 12 points. With McClung and Yurtseven still out as March began and freshman center Malcolm Wilson arriving at the game with walking boot on his left foot after cracking a bone in his leg in practice the previous day, the losing streak stretched to four games when Georgetown hosted Xavier and fell behind 28–22 by halftime, scoring a season low in a half. The Hoyas came back to tie the game at 63–63 in the final seconds, but Xavier won the game 66–63 on a three-pointer with 4.5 seconds left, sweeping the season series. Jahvon Blair had 18 points, Jamorko Pickett added 12 points, and Jagan Mosely had 11 points and seven assists. Georgetown's record fell to 15–14 overall and 5–11 in the Big East.

Georgetown concluded its season with two more games against ranked opponents. In the first, the Hoyas visited No. 8 Creighton. The Bluejays, who hit a season-high 17 three-pointers in 36 attempts, led 48–33 at halftime. In the second half, they extended their lead to 60–39 before the Hoyas went on an 8–0 scoring run to close to 60–47. Creighton then had a 15–6 run of its own and went on to win the game 91–76. In a losing cause, Jahvon Blair led the Hoyas with 22 points, Jamorko Pickett had 17, Terrell Allen finished with 10, and Qudus Wahab, starting for Yurtseven, had the first double-double of his collegiate career with 14 points and 12 rebounds, both season highs for him. No. 14 Villanova then visited Washington on March 7 to close out the regular season. On Senior Day at Capital One Arena, Villanova opened the game with a 14–0 scoring run, and led by as many as 17 points during the first half on 60 percent shooting from the field and 8–for–13 from three-point range, taking a 39–30 lead into halftime. The Hoyas scored the first 11 points of the second half and took a 41–39 lead with 17:35 left to play. The Wildcats pulled back ahead and held their largest lead of the second half at 54–48 with 10:26 left in the game, but Georgetown battled back to a 69–65 lead with 1:04 remaining. Villanova closed to 69–67 with 47 seconds to play. With 5.6 seconds left, Jamorko Pickett fouled Villanova junior forward Jermaine Samuels as Samuels drove the basket and Qudus Wahab blocked Samuels's shot. After a video review, officials confirmed a goaltending call on Wahab, making the basket count, and Samuels then sank his free throw for a three-point play that gave the Wildcats a 70–69 lead. Terrell Allen's shot at the buzzer missed, and, amid a chorus of boos from Georgetown fans displeased with the late-game officiating, Villanova spoiled Georgetown's upset bid with a game-ending 5–0 scoring run. Georgetown's overall record for a season fell below .500 for the first time in Ewing's three-season tenure as head coach. Pickett finished with 20 points, Allen with 17, and Jagan Mosely, in his last home game, with 13 points.

Georgetown clearly missed McClung and Yurtseven, who were averaging a combined 30 points a game when they succumbed to injury, and concluded its regular season with a six-game losing streak and a record of 15–16 overall. For the third time in four seasons, the Hoyas finished with a 5–13 record in the Big East. Georgetown's hopes of consideration for an NCAA bid had vanished with the losing streak, and it entered the Big East tournament needing at least one win, and probably more, for 2020 National Invitation Tournament consideration.

=== Big East tournament ===
Georgetown was seeded eighth in the 2020 Big East tournament. In the first round, played on March 11, the Hoyas faced St. John's, which had finished the regular season tied with the Hoyas but was seeded ninth based on tie-breaking criteria, which gave the nod to Georgetown for sweeping the regular-season series between the teams. It was the third time in four years that the teams had met in the first round of the tournament, playing in the eight-vs.-nine game in each case. Recovering from a medical procedure on his injured foot, Mac McClung did not accompany the team to New York. Ömer Yurtseven did not start, but returned to action off the bench. During the first half, the Hoyas shot 54.5 percent from the field and Terrell Allen scored 18 points, reaching 1,000 points for his college career with his 15th point. In contrast, St. John's struggled to mount a consistent offense during the half and shot only 2–for–13 (15.4 percent) from three-point range. The Hoyas led 42–33 at halftime, and they quickly extended their lead to 15 points in the second half, jumping out to a 48–33 advantage with 18:31 remaining. Georgetown still led 62–52 with 6:31 left to play when the game's momentum shifted entirely to St. John's. During the remainder of the game, Georgetown did not score, missing all 10 shots it took and committing four turnovers. Meanwhile, St. John's finished the game with a 23–0 scoring run, during which Red Storm sophomore forward Marcellus Earlington scored 10 straight points. St. John's enjoyed its biggest comeback of the season by far and its largest in its 41 years of play in the Big East tournament, and the Red Storm knocked Georgetown out of the tournament with a 75–62 victory, the Red Storm's third straight defeat of the Hoyas in a Big East tournament game. Terrell Allen scored 21 points and Jamorko Pickett finished with a double-double (13 points and 10 rebounds), while Yurtseven scored eight points and grabbed six rebounds in 21 minutes of play. The loss brought Georgetown's season to an end and left the Hoyas winless in the Big East tournament since 2016. They finished the season with a record of 15–17, their third losing season in five years, first since the 2016–2017 season, and first under Ewing, whose Big East tournament record as head coach fell to 0–3.

St. John's advanced to play top-seeded Creighton in the first game of the quarterfinals on March 12 and was leading at halftime when the Big East announced the cancellation of the game and of the remainder of the Big East tournament in an effort to reduce large gatherings of people during the growing COVID-19 pandemic. It was the last college basketball game played during the 2019–2020 NCAA basketball season; later that day, the NCAA cancelled all postseason basketball tournaments in 2020, bringing the 2019–2020 season to a sudden end.

=== Wrap-up ===
Plagued by roster problems which began with December's scandals and transfers and were compounded in February and March by injuries to its two top scorers, the 2019–2020 Georgetown team had a tumultuous, frustrating, and disappointing season. Projected preseason to finish sixth — and perhaps higher — in the Big East, the Hoyas finished in a tie for eighth, and they failed to win a Big East tournament game for the fourth straight season. The NCAA's cancellation of the 2020 NCAA Tournament and 2020 NIT occurred before selections for those tournaments could take place, but Georgetown's sub-.500 finish ensured that it would not have returned to the NCAA Tournament and made even an NIT appearance very unlikely. Had the NCAA Tournament taken place, the Hoyas thus would have missed it for a fifth straight year anyway, their longest absence from the tournament since their 31-season NCAA tournament drought from 1944 through 1974. For the fifth straight season, the Hoyas never made the Top 25 in either the Associated Press Poll or the Coaches Poll – the first time that had happened in five consecutive seasons since the Hoyas' 23-year absence from the rankings between 1953 and 1977.

The team played with great heart in spite of its loss of players and had some notable successes during the year, especially the six-game winning streak that followed the departure of Akinjo and LeBlanc and the upset win on the road over No. 19 Butler with both McClung and Yurtseven sidelined by injury. However, the team played so shorthanded from December onward that fatigue took its toll as the season wore on, with the few remaining scholarship players getting little rest during games and having little energy left even for practices; Ewing resorted to having former players — such as recent graduates Kaleb Johnson, Greg Malinowski, and Trey Mourning — join the team for practices to fill out a practice squad, and in March Malinowski told The Washington Post that the practices had become less physically demanding than the ones he remembered while playing for Ewing during the 2018–2019 season in order to allow greater rest for the healthy scholarship players, of which only six remained at the end of the regular season. Georgetown's lack of depth meant that it could not trade fouls with its opponents, requiring the Hoyas to play less aggressively than they otherwise might have, and opponents took advantage of Georgetown's slim roster by rotating their players in and out frequently and establishing a rapid pace of play to tire out the Hoyas by the second half of games. Relying on inside scoring, the 2019–2020 squad had not shot well from three-point range, and had shown troubling defensive lapses.

Mac McClung started 20 of the 21 games he played in but, hobbled by injury throughout February and March, he missed all but eight minutes of the final 11 games of the season. He scored 330 points on 39.4 percent shooting from the field and 32.3 percent from three-point range and he finished the season as the team's top scorer on a per-game basis, averaging 15.7 points, and he grabbed 3.1 rebounds per game. Suffering an injured ankle in each of the two DePaul games, Ömer Yurtseven could not play in six of the season's final eight games, but he nonetheless scored 406 points, the most by any Hoya during the year, appearing in 26 games and starting all of them except for the Big East tournament game, shooting 54.9 percent from the field and averaging 15.5 points and 9.8 rebounds per game. The only other player to score more points than McClung was Jahvon Blair, who appeared in 31 games and started 12, scored 335 points on a field-goal percentage of 36.1 and a three-point percentage of 32.6, and averaged 10.8 points and 3.1 rebounds per game. Jamorko Pickett and Jagan Mosely, an ironman of the season with six complete 40-minute games played, both started every game of Georgetown's 32-game season, Pickett averaging 10.2 points and 6.3 rebounds per game and shooting 58.1 percent overall from the field and 38.4 in three-pointers and Mosely averaging a team-high 34.8 minutes per game, finishing with 8.2 points and 4.5 rebounds per game, and shooting percentages of 58.1 percent overall from the field and 38.4 percent in three-pointers. Terrell Allen also played in every game, starting 25 of them — all of his starts came after he took over as point guard from the departed James Akinjo — shooting 44.8 percent from the field and 40.4 percent in three-pointers, averaging 9.5 points and 2.4 rebounds per game. Qudus Wahab had a promising year, starting seven times for the injured Yurtseven and appearing in all 32 games, shooting 58.3 percent and averaging 5.5 points and 4.3 rebounds per game. Timothy Ighoefe also showed potential in limited action, coming off the bench to average 2.5 points over 12 games. James Akinjo started all seven games in which he played, shooting 33.7 percent from the field and 24.2 percent from three-point range, averaging 13.4 points and three rebounds per game. Josh LeBlanc played in six games, all off the bench, shooting 59.3 percent from the field and 50.0 percent in three-pointers and averaging 7.2 points and 1.8 rebounds per game. Galen Alexander appeared in nine games, all as a reserve, shooting 42.9 percent from the field and 43.8 percent from beyond the arc, scoring 4.2 points and pulling down 2.7 rebounds per game. Myron Gardner appeared in eight games, all off the bench, averaging 3.1 points per game on 36.4 percent shooting from the field and grabbing 2.9 rebounds per game. Among the walk-ons, George Muresan saw 85 minutes of action off the shorthanded bench — compared to 25 minutes combined over his previous three seasons — contributing 10 points and 11 rebounds over 19 appearances, while Jaden Robinson played 45 minutes over 11 games and finished with 10 points and five rebounds and Chuma Azinge appeared in five games, played 11 minutes, and scored a point. Malcolm Wilson did not appear in a game.

Jagan Mosely and George Muresan graduated in May 2020 and graduate transfer Terrell Allen also completed his college eligibility with the end of the season. In his 125-game career, Moseley started 60 games, shooting 46.4 percent overall from the field and 35.5 percent from three-point range and averaging 5.5 points and 2.8 rebounds per game, and he scored 692 points. Muresan, a four-year walk-on, finished with appearances in 31 games during his college career, playing 110 minutes, scoring 13 points, and grabbing 12 rebounds. In addition to his single season at Georgetown, Allen played for a year at Drexel and for two years at Central Florida, and he finished his four-season college career having played in 128 games, starting 108 of them, shooting 44.8 percent from the field and 40.4 percent from three-point range and averaging 7.9 points and 2.9 rebounds per game, scoring 1,006 points. The Class of 2020 was the second consecutive graduating class to spend its entire four years at Georgetown without ever playing in an NCAA Tournament game, the first back-to-back Georgetown graduating classes to miss the NCAA Tournament entirely during their college careers since the Classes of 1973 and 1974.

News of Josh LeBlanc's transfer to LSU broke on January 1, and on January 7 Arizona announced James Akinjo's transfer to play for the Wildcats. When he left the team on December 2, Akinjo had played in 40 games in his Georgetown career of one season plus four weeks, starting 39 of them, and averaged 13.4 points and 2.9 rebounds per game, shooting 35.9 percent from the field and 36.1 percent in three pointers. Leaving the same day, LeBlanc also played for Georgetown for one season plus four weeks, appearing in 39 games, making 22 starts, scoring 342 points on 62.5 percent shooting from the field and 63.6 percent from three-point range, averaging 8.8 points and 6.6 rebounds per game. On January 23, the press reported Galen Alexander's transfer to Texas Southern after a seven-week playing career with Georgetown. Myron Gardner quietly transferred to South Plains College, also after only seven weeks of action with the Hoyas.

The season ended with a widespread assumption that Ömer Yurtseven would not return to Georgetown for the 2020–2021 season, and on April 27 he declared for the 2020 National Basketball Association draft and hired an agent, bringing his college eligibility to an end after a single season of play as a Hoya. He went undrafted. Yursteven had played two seasons at North Carolina State before arriving at Georgetown, and over his three-season college career he played in 81 games, starting 61 of them, shooting 53.9 percent from the field and 42.6 percent from three-point range and averaging 12.1 points and 7.1 rebounds per game. On May 5, Jamorko Pickett announced he would also enter the 2020 NBA draft, although he retained his college eligibility for the time being. Ultimately, he returned to Georgetown for the following season.

Confusion over Mac McClung's plans arose during the spring. On March 29, he surprised many observers by announcing his intention to enter the 2020 NBA draft while taking steps to maintain his college eligibility if he withdrew from the draft by June 15. After Ewing told the press on May 5 that he understood that McClung would return to Georgetown for the 2020–2021 season, McClung's agent disputed it, saying that McClung remained in the draft, and McClung's representatives later told the press that Ewing's comments may have influenced how NBA teams viewed McClung. Finally, on May 13, McClung announced that he had withdrawn from the NBA draft and would transfer from Georgetown in an effort to gain collegiate experience elsewhere as a point guard, which NBA teams had urged him to do, rather than in the shooting guard role he played with the Hoyas. McClung told ESPN, "It was a number of different events that made me feel I had no choice but to transfer from Georgetown. I really wanted to stay, but things throughout my career made me realize that I couldn’t. I’m looking for a place I can call home, a place I can be a part of a family and help them succeed." On May 27, he announced that he would transfer to Texas Tech for the 2020–2021 season and apply for a waiver from the NCAA requirement to sit out a season after transferring. McClung finished his two seasons at Georgetown with appearances in 50 games, 49 of them starts, averaging 14.2 points and 2.8 rebounds per game, shooting 39.3 percent overall and 29.5 percent from three-point range. McClung's departure meant that Ewing had lost his entire 2018 class of recruits — Akinjo, Leblanc, Grayson Carter, and McClung — to transfer, and it capped off the Hoyas' tumultuous 2019–2020 season. McClung was the fifth Georgetown player to transfer since December and the eighth in Ewing's three years as head coach.

Georgetown's season began in November with great promise and high expectations. The Georgetown program and its fans had expected a breakout season in which the Hoyas performed well in Big East play, returned to the NCAA Tournament for the first time in five years, and put themselves in a position to build further for the 2020–2021 season. Even before McClung announced his exploration of NBA draft prospects in late March, however, at least some observers felt that by the time it ended on a seven-game losing streak, with a record little better than that of John Thompson III's final year as head coach in the 2016-2017 season and with a depleted roster, the 2019–2020 season instead represented a step backward for the program, with no real progress toward a return to the NCAA Tournament and national prominence during Ewing's three years as head coach. McClung's transfer heightened these concerns; the hope that in 2020–2021 Georgetown would reestablish itself as an elite team, nationally ranked and likely to resume annual NCAA Tournament appearances, had been replaced by an expectation of another rebuilding year in 2020–2021 in which real success in the Big East and an NCAA Tournament bid were unlikely. The loss of five players to transfer, the graduation of Jagan Mosely, and Yurtseven's departure for a professional career left Georgetown with only two players on its roster who would be seniors the following season and the likelihood of having seven or more new faces on that team. Its offseason needs included securing graduate transfers among its recruits to season what otherwise promised to be a young and inexperienced team in 2020–2021. With three open scholarship positions left to fill even before the loss of McClung opened up a fourth, and under great pressure to find both top talent and players whose character issues would not lead to a repeat of the scandals of December, Ewing and his staff had begun an aggressive recruiting effort by mid-March, reportedly exerting a greater effort to assess the character and "coachability" of players before recruiting them.

The disappointing 2019–2020 season left Georgetown's fan base split in its feelings about Ewing. Ewing had demonstrated talent as a head coach under difficult circumstances, but the transfers of 2019–2020, as well as three other transfers and two dismissals of players from the program during Ewing's three-year tenure as head coach, made it unclear that he could retain the talent he recruited and raised concerns that there might be systemic problems in the program. The program and its fans hoped that the loss of Mac McClung was the final step in moving on from Ewing's failure to retain any of the recruiting class of 2018. With the COVID-19 pandemic sweeping the world in the spring of 2020 — Ewing himself announced on May 22 that he had tested positive for COVID-19 and was undergoing treatment at a hospital in the Washington, D.C., area; his son, former Georgetown player and assistant coach Patrick Ewing Jr., announced on May 25 that he had left the hospital and was recovering at home — it was unclear whether a college basketball season would be played in 2020–2021, but if the season took place, the hope at Georgetown was that the team could use it to build toward a more successful future, perhaps with a return to the NCAA Tournament during the 2021-2022 season.

== Attendance ==
Georgetown averaged 7,939 fans per home game during the 2019–2020 season, 66th among the 351 NCAA Division I teams and a 10 percent increase over the 30-year low of 7,212 they averaged per game the previous season. On average, a Georgetown game filled Capital One Arena to 38.6 percent of its capacity. In Big East Conference home games, the Hoyas averaged 8,854 fans per game, which was eighth out of the ten teams in the conference and on average filled Capital One Arena to 43.1 percent of its capacity.

== Schedule and results ==
Date time, TV	Rank^{#}	Opponent^{#}	Result	Record	High points	High rebounds	High assists	Site (attendance) city, state
2019 Bahamas Foreign Tour (Exhibition)
August 12, 2019*; 7:00pm, FloHoops		vs. Commonwealth Bank Giants; Bahamas Basketball Federation; Summer of Thunder 2019	W 103–77	—	16 – Akinjo	9 – Yurtseven	4 – Tied	Kendal G. L. Isaacs; National Gymnasium (N/A); Atlantis Paradise Island, Nassau, Bahamas
August 14, 2019*; 7:00pm, FloHoops		vs. New Providence; Basketball Association; Bahamas Basketball Federation; Summer of Thunder 2019	W 112–67	—	21 – Tied	7 – Yurtseven	8 – Akinjo	Kendal G. L. Isaacs; National Gymnasium (90); Atlantis Paradise Island, Nassau, Bahamas
August 15, 2019*; 5:00pm, FloHoops		vs. Bahamas National Team; Bahamas Basketball Federation; Summer of Thunder 2019	W 91–61	—	13 – Tied	8 – Akinjo	6 – Akinjo	Kendal G. L. Isaacs; National Gymnasium (100); Atlantis Paradise Island, Nassau, Bahamas
Non-conference regular season
November 6, 2019*; 7:00 pm, CBSSN		Mount St. Mary's	W 81–68	1–0	20 – Tied	12 – Yurtseven	5 – Akinjo	Capital One Arena (5,214); Washington, D.C.
November 9, 2019*; 12:00 p.m., FSN/MASN2		Central Arkansas; Empire Classic campus game	W 89–78	2–0	17 – Yurtseven	15 – Yurtseven	7 – Akinjo	Capital One Arena (5,785); Washington, D.C.
November 14, 2019*; 6:30 p.m., FS1		Penn State; Gavitt Tipoff Games	L 66–81	2–1	16 – Yurtseven	10 – Yurtseven	3 – Mosely	Capital One Arena (8,691); Washington, D.C.
November 17, 2019*; 7:30 p.m., FS1		Georgia State; Empire Classic campus game	W 91–83	3–1	25 – McClung	13 – Yurtseven	4 – Akinjo	Capital One Arena (4,118); Washington, D.C.
November 21, 2019*; 7:00 p.m., ESPN2		vs. No. 22 Texas; Empire Classic semifinal	W 82–66	4–1	19 – McClung	7 – Mosely	6 – Akinjo	Madison Square Garden; New York, NY
November 22, 2019*; 7:00 p.m., ESPN2		vs. No. 1 Duke; Empire Classic championship	L 73–81	4–2	21 – Yurtseven	5 – Tied	6 – Akinjo	Madison Square Garden (13,777); New York, NY
November 30, 2019*; 2:00 p.m., FS2		UNC Greensboro	L 61–65	4–3	12 – Akinjo	9 – Yurtseven	3 – Allen	Capital One Arena (7,302); Washington, D.C.
December 4, 2019*; 8:00 pm, ESPN+		at Oklahoma State; Big East/Big 12 Battle	W 81–74	5–3	33 – McClung	9 – Yurtseven	5 – Allen	Gallagher-Iba Arena (9,188); Stillwater, OK
December 7, 2019*; 9:30 pm, ESPNU		at SMU	W 91–74	6–3	21 – Blair	8 – Yurtseven	7 – McClung	Moody Coliseum (5,855); University Park, TX
December 14, 2019*; 1:00 p.m., FOX		Syracuse; Rivalry	W 89–79	7–3	26 – McClung	9 – Tied	6 – Allen	Capital One Arena (15,102); Washington, D.C.
December 17, 2019*; 6:30 p.m., FS1		UMBC	W 81–55	8–3	22 – Yurtseven	13 – Yurtseven	8 – Allen	Capital One Arena (4,088); Washington, D.C.
December 21, 2019*; 12:00 p.m., FS1		Samford	W 99–71	9–3	32 – Yurtseven	17 – Yurtseven	7 – Allen	Capital One Arena (5,529); Washington, D.C.
December 28, 2019*; 12:00 p.m., FS1		American	W 80–60	10–3	17 – Yurtseven	8 – Yurtseven	5 – Allen	Capital One Arena (7,245); Washington, D.C.
Big East regular season
December 31, 2019; 5:30 p.m., FS1		at Providence	L 60–76	10–4 (0–1)	14 – Yurtseven	10 – Yurtseven	4 – Tied	Dunkin' Donuts Center (10,980); Providence, RI
January 3, 2020; 9:15 p.m., FS1		at Seton Hall	L 62–78	10–5 (0–2)	20 – McClung	9 – Pickett	4 – Mosely	Prudential Center (10,481); Newark, NJ
January 8, 2020; 6:30 p.m., FS1		St. John's; Rivalry	W 87–66	11–5 (1–2)	24 – McClung	11 – Tied	7 – Mosely	Capital One Arena (7,436); Washington, D.C.
January 11, 2020; 12:00 p.m., FS1		at No. 16 Villanova	L 66–80	11–6 (1–3)	13 – Wahab	7 – Yurtseven	6 – Allen	Wells Fargo Center (15,041); Philadelphia, PA
January 15, 2020; 7:00 p.m., CBSSN		No. 25 Creighton	W 83–80	12–6 (2–3)	20 – Yurtseven	13 – Yurtseven	5 – Tied	Capital One Arena (5,920); Washington, D.C.
January 18, 2020; 2:15 p.m., FS1		Marquette	L 80–84	12–7 (2–4)	24 – McClung	11 – Yurtseven	5 – Tied	Capital One Arena (12,514); Washington, D.C.
January 22, 2020; 6:30 p.m., FS1		at Xavier	L 57–66	12–8 (2–5)	19 – McClung	10 – Pickett	4 – Mosely	Cintas Center (10,387); Cincinnati, OH
January 28, 2020; 9:15 p.m., CBSSN		No. 16 Butler	L 64–69	12–9 (2–6)	14 – Yurtseven	13 – Yurtseven	7 – Allen	Capital One Arena (5,329); Washington, D.C.
February 2, 2020; 1:00 p.m., CBS		at St. John's; Rivalry	W 73–72	13–9 (3–6)	23 – Blair	15 – Yurtseven	5 – Blair	Madison Square Garden (8,100); New York, NY
February 5, 2020; 8:45 p.m., FS1		No. 12 Seton Hall	L 71–78	13–10 (3–7)	19 – Yurtseven	15 – Yurtseven	6 – Mosely	Capital One Arena (4,344); Washington, D.C.
February 8, 2020; 12:00 p.m., FSN		DePaul	W 76–72	14–10 (4–7)	30 – Blair	8 – Yurtseven	9 – Allen	Capital One Arena (10,308); Washington, D.C.
February 15, 2020; 2:30 p.m., FOX		at No. 19 Butler	W 73–66	15–10 (5–7)	22 – Allen	7 – Wahab	5 – Mosely	Hinkle Fieldhouse (9,158); Indianapolis, IN
February 19, 2020; 8:45 p.m., FS1		Providence	L 63–73	15–11 (5–8)	20 – Blair	12 – Pickett	3 – Allen	Capital One Arena (7,371); Washington, D.C.
February 22, 2020; 9:00 p.m., FS1		at DePaul	L 68–74	15–12 (5–9)	21 – Allen	8 – Tied	3 – Allen	Wintrust Arena (6,045); Chicago, IL
February 26, 2020; 8:30 p.m., FS1		at Marquette	L 72–93	15–13 (5–10)	19 – Mosely	6 – Tied	4 – Tied	Fiserv Forum (13,855); Milwaukee, WI
March 1, 2020; 2:00 p.m., CBS		Xavier	L 63–66	15–14 (5–11)	18 – Blair	7 – Ighoefe	7 – Mosely	Capital One Arena (10,610); Washington, D.C.
March 4, 2020; 8:00 p.m., FSN		at No. 8 Creighton	L 76–91	15–15 (5–12)	22 – Blair	12 – Wahab	7 – Blair	CHI Health Center Omaha (17,696); Omaha, NE
March 7, 2020; 12:00 p.m., FOX		No. 14 Villanova	L 69−70	15−16 (5−13)	20 – Pickett	8 – Tied	4 – Allen	Capital One Arena (13,168); Washington, D.C.
Big East tournament
March 11, 2020; 7:00 pm, FS1	(8)	vs. (9) St. John's; First round	L 62−75	15−17	21 – Allen	10 – Pickett	4 – Blair/Pickett	Madison Square Garden; New York, NY
*Non-conference game. ^{#}Rankings from AP Poll. (#) Tournament seedings in parentheses. All times are in Eastern Time.

== Awards and honors ==
=== Big East Conference honors ===
Preseason honors
Honors	Player	Position	Date awarded	Ref.
Preseason All-Big East Second Team	James Akinjo	G	October 10, 2019	
Preseason All-Big East Honorable Mention	Ömer Yurtseven	C	October 10, 2019	

Weekly honors
Honors	Player	Position	Date awarded	Ref.
Big East Men’s Basketball Player of the Week	Mac McClung	G	December 9, 2019	
Big East Men’s Basketball Player of the Week	Mac McClung (2)	G	December 16, 2019	

Postseason honors
Honors	Player	Position	Date awarded	Ref.
All-Big East Honorable Mention	Ömer Yurtseven	C	March 8, 2020	
Big East Sportsmanship Award	Jagan Mosely	G	March 9, 2020	
