= Mac McClung =

American basketball player (born 1999)

- McClung with Girona in 2026

No. 0 – Bàsquet Girona
- Position: Point guard / shooting guard
- League: Liga ACB; FIBA Europe Cup

Personal information
- Born: January 6, 1999 (age 27) Gate City, Virginia, U.S.
- Listed height: 6 ft 2 in (1.88 m)
- Listed weight: 185 lb (84 kg)

Career information
- High school: Gate City (Gate City, Virginia)
- College: Georgetown (2018–2020); Texas Tech (2020–2021)
- NBA draft: 2021: undrafted
- Playing career: 2021–present

Career history
- 2021: South Bay Lakers
- 2021–2022: Chicago Bulls
- 2022: →Windy City Bulls
- 2022: South Bay Lakers
- 2022: Los Angeles Lakers
- 2022–2023: Delaware Blue Coats
- 2023: Philadelphia 76ers
- 2023: →Delaware Blue Coats
- 2023–2024: Osceola Magic
- 2024–2025: Orlando Magic
- 2024–2025: →Osceola Magic
- 2025: Indiana Pacers
- 2025–2026: Windy City Bulls
- 2026: Chicago Bulls
- 2026: →Windy City Bulls
- 2026–present: Girona

Career highlights
- 3× NBA Slam Dunk Contest champion (2023–2025); NBA G League champion (2023); 2× NBA G League Most Valuable Player (2024, 2026); 3× All-NBA G League First Team (2024–2026); NBA G League Rookie of the Year (2022); NBA G League All-Rookie Team (2022); 2× NBA G League scoring leader (2024, 2026); NBA G League Next Up Game (2023); Big 12 Newcomer of the Year (2021); Big 12 All-Newcomer Team (2021); Big East All-Freshman Team (2019)
- Stats at NBA.com
- Stats at Basketball Reference

Matthew Ford "Mac" McClung (born January 6, 1999) is an American professional basketball player for Bàsquet Girona of the Liga ACB and the FIBA Europe Cup. He played college basketball for the Georgetown Hoyas and the Texas Tech Red Raiders. He was a consensus three-star recruit and among the highest-ranked high school players in Virginia. He is one of two players to be a three-time NBA Slam Dunk Contest champion, alongside Nate Robinson, and the only player to win three consecutive Slam Dunk Contests.

McClung went unselected in the 2021 NBA draft and spent time during the 2021–22 season with the Chicago Bulls and Los Angeles Lakers. He won the 2021–22 NBA G League Rookie of the Year award with the South Bay Lakers of the G League. McClung joined the Blue Coats for the 2022–23 season and signed with the 76ers in February 2023. He won the NBA Slam Dunk Contest at the 2023, 2024, and 2025 NBA All-Star Game. He has earned the 2024 and 2026 NBA G League Most Valuable Player Award, and holds the record for the most points scored in G League History.

== Early life ==
McClung grew up in Gate City, Virginia, a small town of about 2,000 in the Tri-Cities metropolitan area straddling the Tennessee–Virginia border, where he initially began playing football—a sport that is far more popular than basketball in Southwest Virginia. Family members recalled in a 2018 interview that McClung was extraordinarily competitive as a child. His father Marcus said of him, "Mac was just born with it. If you’re fixing a bowl of cereal, he’s going to make a competition." His older sister Anna would add, "He would just come at you every day, no matter how small he was." His parents built a basement gym in their home, initially for Anna, but Mac would regularly use it as he grew up—though he was so competitive that his father would frequently ban him from the gym to allow Anna to work out undisturbed.

He received his first significant exposure to basketball just before entering the seventh grade, when his mother Lenoir signed him up for a local youth league. Scott Vermillion, who was McClung's coach at Gate City High School, recalled in 2018, "He ducked his head inside for a minute and basically never left." McClung soon became more interested in basketball and began training for the sport regularly, with hopes of making the National Basketball Association (NBA), and his father was silently pleased when he gave up football after his freshman year of high school. According to McClung, his shooting form improved after he broke his arm while snowboarding in eighth grade, and he honed the skill with Greg Ervin, the former head coach at Gate City High.

== High school career ==
McClung first started dunking as a sophomore playing varsity basketball at Gate City High School. He grew in profile as an acrobatic dunker through the rest of his high school career. MaxPreps labeled him "one of nation's most exciting players." As a junior, on February 24, 2017, he scored a career-high 64 points in a loss to Dan River High School at the Virginia High School League (VHSL) Region 2A West tournament. It was the best scoring performance in school history and the highest among Virginia public schools since 1984. After the season, he was averaging 29 points, 5.5 assists and three steals per game for the Blue Devils and was tabbed Southwest Virginia Boys' Basketball Player of the Year by the Bristol Herald Courier. In the summer, he committed to play for Rutgers in college.

On December 12, McClung made his senior debut by scoring 47 points, shooting 18-of-23, in a 96–43 win over Lee High School. Among those in attendance was Georgetown head coach Patrick Ewing. On January 11, 2018, after opposing coach James Schooler reportedly told him "you're going to Georgetown to sit", McClung scored 44 points against Fern Creek High School of Louisville, Kentucky, at the Arby's Classic tournament in Bristol, Tennessee. McClung broke the VHSL single-season scoring record previously held by Hall of Famer Allen Iverson during the 2018 VHSL regional playoffs on February 21, surpassing Iverson's record of 948 points in 25 games—five fewer than it took Iverson to amass the previous record. He ended his high school career with Gate City's first state championship, scoring 47 points in an 80–65 title-game win over Staunton's Robert E. Lee High. The 47 points broke a VHSL all-classes scoring record for a championship game that had been held by former NBA player JJ Redick. McClung finished the season with 1,153 points and 2,801 for his career, also a VHSL all-classes record, and was again named Southwest Virginia Player of the Year by the Herald Courier. He won the slam dunk contest at the Ballislife All-American Game.

=== Recruiting ===
Prior to his final high school season, on October 6, 2017, McClung decommitted from Rutgers. Over one week later, he committed to Georgetown.

College recruiting
| Name | Hometown | School | Height | Weight | Commit date |
|---|---|---|---|---|---|
| Mac McClung; PG | Gate City, VA | Gate City (VA) | 6 ft 2 in (1.88 m) | 175 lb (79 kg) | Oct 15, 2017 |
| Mac McClung; PG | Recruit ratings: Rivals: 247Sports: ESPN: (79) | | | | |
Overall recruit ranking: Rivals: — 247Sports: 235 ESPN: —
Note: In many cases, Scout, Rivals, 247Sports, On3, and ESPN may conflict in their listings of height and weight.; In these cases, the average was taken. ESPN grades are on a 100-point scale.; Sources: "Georgetown 2018 Basketball Commitments". Rivals.; "2018 Georgetown Hoyas Recruiting Class". ESPN.; "2018 Team Ranking". Rivals.

== College career ==
=== Georgetown (2018–2020) ===
On December 22, 2018, McClung scored a freshman season-high 38 points for Georgetown in a 102–94 victory over Little Rock. As a freshman, he averaged 13.1 points, 2.6 rebounds and two assists per game, leading Big East Conference freshmen in scoring. McClung was named to the Big East All-Freshman Team. In February 2020, during his sophomore season, he missed several games with a foot injury. McClung only played 21 games due to the injury, averaging 15.7 points, 2.4 assists and 1.4 steals in 27 minutes per game as a sophomore. After the season, he declared for the 2020 NBA draft and signed with an NCAA-certified agent to maintain his collegiate eligibility. On May 13, he withdrew from the draft and entered the NCAA transfer portal.

=== Texas Tech (2020–2021) ===
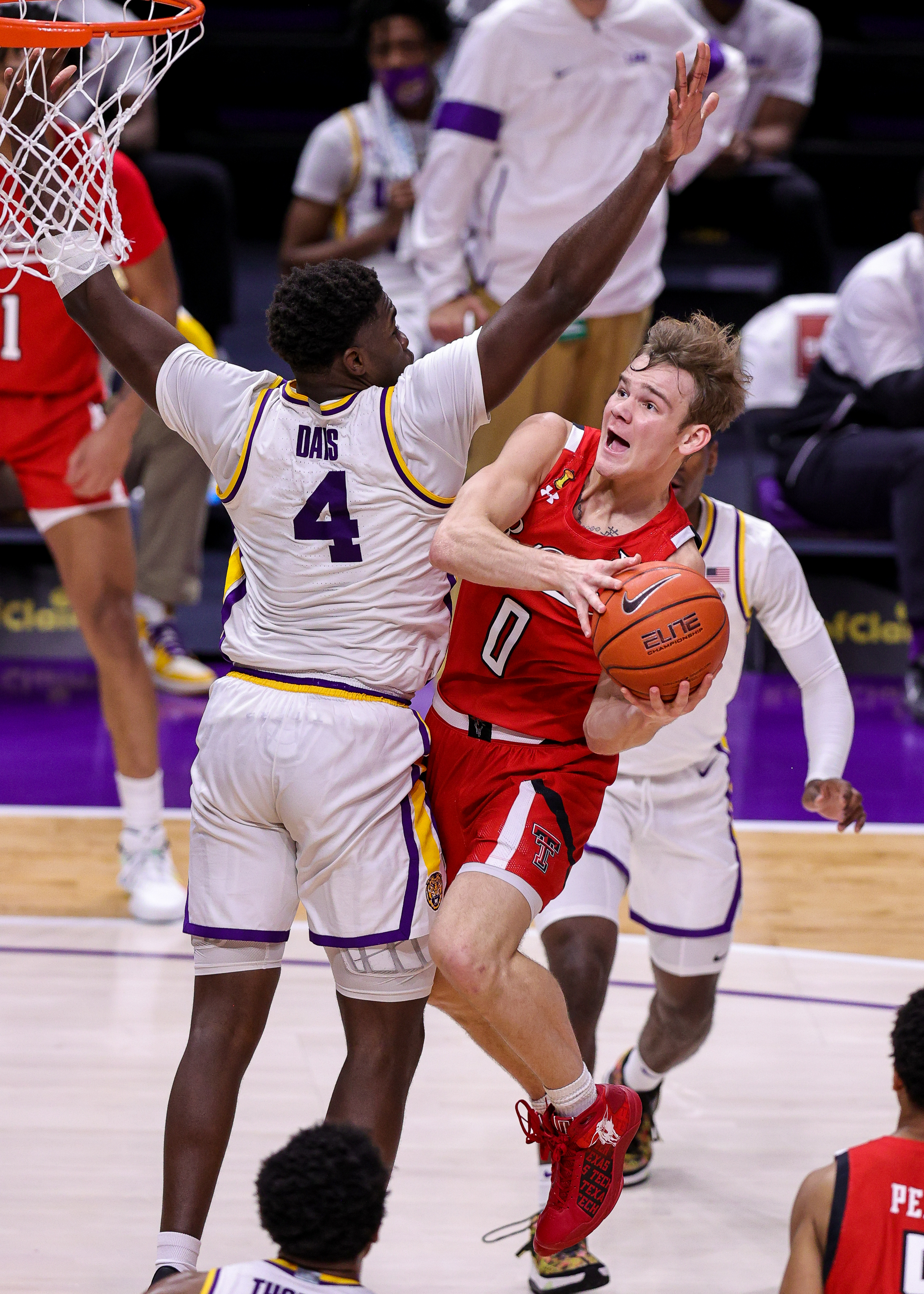
McCLung with the Raiders basketball team in 2021

On May 27, 2020, McClung left Georgetown and announced that he would transfer to Texas Tech. He was granted a waiver for immediate eligibility on October 30. In his Texas Tech debut on November 25, McClung scored 20 points in a 101–58 win against Northwestern State. As a junior, he averaged 15.5 points, 2.7 rebounds and 2.1 assists per game.

McClung entered the transfer portal again in April 2021 while simultaneously declaring for the 2021 NBA draft. In May 2021, McClung confirmed via Twitter that he would remain in the draft and forgo his remaining college eligibility.

== Professional career ==
=== South Bay Lakers (2021) ===
After going undrafted in the 2021 NBA draft, McClung joined the Los Angeles Lakers for the 2021 NBA Summer League, and signed afterward with the team on August 10, 2021. However, he was waived on October 13. On October 23, 2021, he signed with the South Bay Lakers of the NBA G League, the affiliate team of the Los Angeles Lakers. McClung's debut with South Bay consisted of a game-high 24 points, nine assists and six rebounds in a 112–105 victory over the NBA G League Ignite on November 5, 2021.

=== Chicago / Windy City Bulls (2021–2022) ===
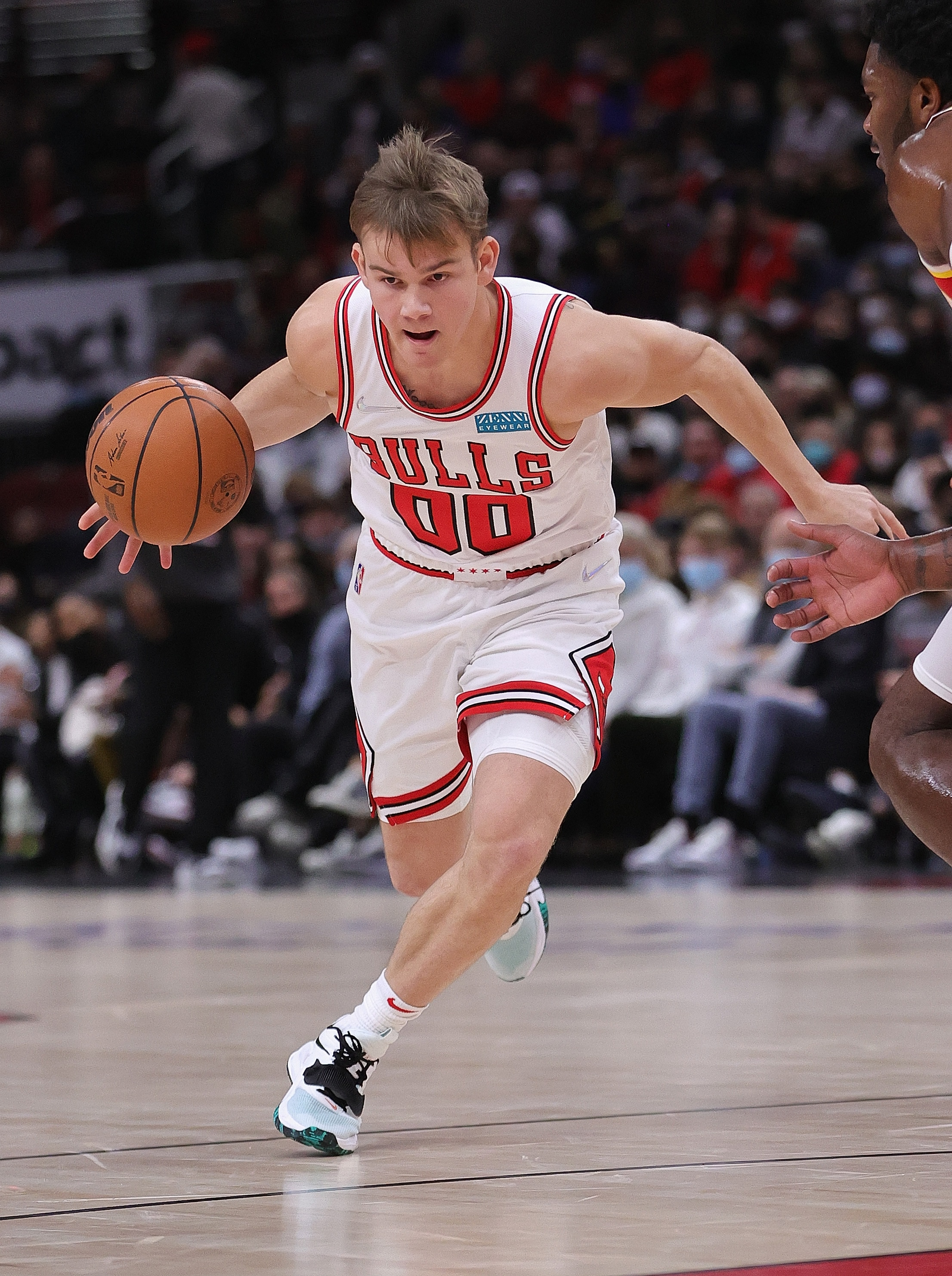
McClung with Chicago Bulls in 2021

On December 22, 2021, McClung signed a 10-day contract with the Chicago Bulls. He signed a second 10-day contract with them on January 1, 2022. On January 4, 2022, the Chicago Bulls assigned McClung to their NBA G League affiliate, the Windy City Bulls. McClung debuted the next night, scoring 19 points and adding nine assists in a 112–108 loss to the Motor City Cruise. On January 6, 2022, McClung was recalled to the main roster.

=== Return to South Bay / Los Angeles Lakers (2022) ===
On January 11, 2022, after his 10-day contracts expired, McClung was reacquired by the South Bay Lakers. He was named the 2021–22 G League Rookie of the Year.

On April 9, 2022, McClung signed a two-way contract with the Los Angeles Lakers. On June 29, Los Angeles declined his $1.62 million qualifying offer, making him an unrestricted free agent. He joined the Lakers for the California Classic in the 2022 NBA Summer League.

After playing two games for the Lakers' summer league team, McClung joined the Golden State Warriors' summer squad. On July 22, 2022, McClung signed a one-year, non-guaranteed contract with the Warriors. On October 3, McClung was released by the Warriors.

=== Delaware Blue Coats / Philadelphia 76ers (2022–2023) ===
On October 9, 2022, the Philadelphia 76ers signed McClung to an Exhibit 10 contract before waiving him a day later. He later joined the NBA G League's Delaware Blue Coats for the 2022–23 season. Later that season, he was named to the G League's inaugural Next Up Game.

On February 14, 2023, McClung signed a two-way contract with the Philadelphia 76ers, and on February 18, he won the 2023 NBA Slam Dunk Contest; 19 out of his 20 scores from the judges were a perfect 50, with a lone 49 in his second dunk of the first round. On April 7, he won the NBA G League title with the Blue Coats.

On April 9, 2023, in Philadelphia's last game of the regular season, McClung recorded a near-triple-double with 20 points, nine rebounds and nine assists to help the 76ers defeat the Brooklyn Nets, 134–105.

=== Orlando / Osceola Magic (2023–2025) ===
On September 13, 2023, McClung signed with the Orlando Magic but was waived on October 21. On November 2, he joined the Osceola Magic. On February 17, 2024, McClung won the 2024 NBA Slam Dunk Contest for the second consecutive year, joining Michael Jordan, Jason Richardson, Nate Robinson and Zach LaVine as the only players to win back-to-back contests. Furthermore, he became the first and only player from a G-League team to win the contest, as he had been called up by the 76ers a day before the previous year's contest. On April 5, he was named NBA G League Most Valuable Player after averaging 25.7 points, 4.7 rebounds and 6.6 assists in 27 games while scoring 30-plus points in eight of them.

On September 20, 2024, McClung re-signed with the Orlando Magic and on October 19, his Exhibit 10 contract was converted into a two-way contract.

On February 15, 2025, McClung won the 2025 NBA Slam Dunk Contest, having four dunks that were scored a perfect 50 by the judges. McClung is the only player in NBA history to win the Slam Dunk Contest three years in a row. He also joined Nate Robinson as the only players in NBA history to win the contest three times.

McClung re-signed with the Chicago Bulls on October 17, 2025. Just three hours later, the Bulls waived McClung, replacing him with Trentyn Flowers.

=== Indiana Pacers (2025) ===
On October 27, 2025, McClung was signed to a multi-year contract with the Indiana Pacers. On October 29, he made his Pacers debut against the Dallas Mavericks, and in 13 minutes, he finished with seven points, two rebounds, one assist, two steals, and one block while also going 1-for-3 from the three-point line. In three appearances for Indiana, he averaged 6.3 points, 1.3 rebounds, and 0.3 assists in 11.3 minutes. On November 6, McClung was waived by Indiana after the team signed Monté Morris.

=== Return to Chicago / Windy City Bulls (2025–2026) ===
On November 9, 2025, McClung joined the Windy City Bulls. On February 5, 2026, the Bulls re-signed McClung to a two-way contract. The same day, McClung made his debut with the Bulls, scoring four points in 13 minutes; he also got one rebound, an assist, and a block to pair with his points. Although it was announced that McClung wouldn't be participating in the 2026 Dunk Contest, he was announced as the replacement for David Jones García in the 2026 Castrol Rising Stars game.

On March 10, 2026, McClung scored 54 points with the Windy City Bulls against the College Park Skyhawks, which is the fifth-highest scoring game in G League history. On March 24, he became the G-League's all-time leading scorer after scoring 59 points against the Birmingham Squadron, the third highest scoring game in league history.

On April 3, 2026, McClung was named the MVP of the 2025–2026 NBA G League season. This was his second MVP honor, making him the first player in league history to win multiple awards after earning it in 2023–2024.

=== Bàsquet Girona (2026–present) ===
On August 6, 2026, McClung signed with Bàsquet Girona of the Liga ACB and the FIBA Europe Cup.

== Career statistics ==
Legend
| GP | Games played | GS | Games started | MPG | Minutes per game |
| FG% | Field goal percentage | 3P% | 3-point field goal percentage | FT% | Free throw percentage |
| RPG | Rebounds per game | APG | Assists per game | SPG | Steals per game |
| BPG | Blocks per game | PPG | Points per game | **Bold** | Career high |

=== NBA ===
==== Regular season ====
| Year | Team | GP | GS | MPG | FG% | 3P% | FT% | RPG | APG | SPG | BPG | PPG |
|---|---|---|---|---|---|---|---|---|---|---|---|---|
| 2021–22 | Chicago | 1 | 0 | 3.0 | **1.000** | — | — | .0 | .0 | .0 | .0 | 2.0 |
| 2021–22 | L.A. Lakers | 1 | 0 | **22.0** | .400 | .333 | **1.000** | 3.0 | 1.0 | 1.0 | **1.0** | 6.0 |
| 2022–23 | Philadelphia | 2 | 0 | 20.5 | .450 | **.364** | .600 | **5.0** | **4.5** | .0 | .0 | **12.5** |
| 2024–25 | Orlando | 2 | 0 | 5.0 | .000 | .000 | — | .5 | 1.5 | .0 | .0 | .0 |
| 2025–26 | Indiana | 3 | 0 | 11.3 | .389 | .200 | .750 | 1.3 | .3 | **1.7** | .3 | 6.3 |
| 2025–26 | Chicago | **8** | 0 | 12.6 | .390 | .250 | .786 | .8 | 1.1 | .8 | .3 | 6.0 |
| Career | | 17 | 0 | 12.4 | .402 | .267 | .750 | 1.4 | 1.4 | .7 | .2 | 5.9 |

=== NBA G League ===
==== Showcase Cup ====
| Year | Team | GP | GS | MPG | FG% | 3P% | FT% | RPG | APG | SPG | BPG | PPG |
|---|---|---|---|---|---|---|---|---|---|---|---|---|
| 2021–22 | South Bay | 13 | 13 | 31.7 | .484 | **.403** | .829 | 3.3 | 5.8 | **1.2** | .3 | 19.6 |
| 2022–23 | Delaware | **18** | 9 | 28.8 | .431 | .321 | .741 | **4.6** | 5.8 | .9 | .1 | 17.4 |
| 2023–24 | Osceola | 14 | **14** | **35.6** | .470 | .360 | **.833** | 4.5 | 5.9 | 1.1 | .1 | **25.2** |
| 2024–25 | Osceola | 14 | **14** | 31.7 | .410 | .256 | .829 | 3.7 | 4.5 | .7 | **.7** | 17.4 |
| 2025–26 | Windy City | 11 | 11 | 32.9 | **.511** | .383 | .795 | 3.3 | **6.7** | **1.2** | .5 | 23.5 |
| Career | | 70 | 61 | 31.9 | .458 | .342 | .803 | 4.0 | 5.7 | 1.0 | .3 | 20.3 |

==== Regular season ====
| Year | Team | GP | GS | MPG | FG% | 3P% | FT% | RPG | APG | SPG | BPG | PPG |
|---|---|---|---|---|---|---|---|---|---|---|---|---|
| 2021–22 | South Bay | 26 | 26 | **36.2** | .473 | .374 | .880 | **6.8** | 7.5 | **1.5** | .2 | 21.6 |
| 2021–22 | Windy City | 1 | 1 | 32.0 | .389 | .400 | **1.000** | 4.0 | **8.0** | 1.0 | **1.0** | 19.0 |
| 2022–23 | Delaware | **31** | 28 | 26.8 | **.550** | **.474** | .823 | 2.7 | 4.9 | .8 | .2 | 19.8 |
| 2023–24 | Osceola | 28 | 27 | 34.1 | .515 | .396 | .841 | 4.6 | 6.5 | 1.4 | .5 | 24.7 |
| 2024–25 | Osceola | 30 | **30** | 32.7 | .511 | .378 | .827 | 4.0 | 5.7 | .9 | .4 | 25.7 |
| 2025–26 | Windy City | 29 | 29 | 36.1 | .515 | .381 | .775 | 3.4 | 7.9 | 1.2 | .7 | **31.8** |
| Career | | 145 | 141 | 33.0 | .512 | .397 | .822 | 4.2 | 6.5 | 1.2 | .4 | 24.7 |

==== Playoffs ====
| Year | Team | GP | GS | MPG | FG% | 3P% | FT% | RPG | APG | SPG | BPG | PPG |
|---|---|---|---|---|---|---|---|---|---|---|---|---|
| 2022 | South Bay | 2 | 2 | 38.5 | .412 | .400 | .556 | **6.0** | **10.0** | .0 | **1.0** | 22.5 |
| 2023 | Delaware | 4 | 4 | 36.0 | **.493** | .333 | .842 | 4.8 | 5.8 | **1.3** | .0 | 25.3 |
| 2024 | Osceola | 1 | 1 | **42.0** | .476 | **.444** | **1.000** | 3.0 | 1.0 | .0 | .0 | 29.0 |
| 2025 | Osceola | **5** | **5** | 36.4 | .461 | .385 | .895 | 2.8 | 6.4 | 1.0 | .2 | **31.0** |
| Career | | 12 | 12 | 37.1 | .464 | .378 | .820 | 4.0 | 6.3 | .8 | .3 | 27.5 |

=== College ===
| Year | Team | GP | GS | MPG | FG% | 3P% | FT% | RPG | APG | SPG | BPG | PPG |
|---|---|---|---|---|---|---|---|---|---|---|---|---|
| 2018–19 | Georgetown | **29** | **29** | 26.4 | .392 | .277 | .798 | 2.6 | 2.0 | .8 | .1 | 13.1 |
| 2019–20 | Georgetown | 21 | 20 | 26.8 | .394 | .323 | **.802** | **3.1** | **2.4** | **1.4** | .2 | **15.7** |
| 2020–21 | Texas Tech | **29** | **29** | **30.2** | **.419** | **.343** | .793 | 2.7 | 2.1 | .8 | **.3** | 15.5 |
| Career | | 79 | 78 | 27.9 | .403 | .313 | .797 | 2.8 | 2.2 | 1.0 | .2 | 14.7 |

== Personal life ==
McClung is the son of Marcus McClung and Lenoir McClung. During his birth, his umbilical cord was tightly wrapped around his neck; his father recalled, "He was blue as a Smurf." The attending physicians quickly freed him, and he almost immediately recovered. His parents met at Virginia Tech, where Marcus played football and Lenoir was a cheerleader. His father became an attorney, serving as Commonwealth Attorney for Scott County, Virginia as of 2018, while his mother was teaching driver's education at Gate City High. According to a 2018 story in The Washington Post, as well as a story in The Undefeated, his parents' background aided McClung in his athletic pursuits. His father served as trainer for much of his youth, and the family was able to afford placing him on a Richmond-based AAU travel team.

His sister Anna, who completed her high school soccer career as the VHSL's all-time goal scoring leader, played the sport at Florida State and Tennessee, and his uncle Seth competed with two Major League Baseball (MLB) teams. His cousins Correne and Colette both played Division I college hockey and pro hockey; Correne also played with the Canadian national team. Although Houston rapper Riff Raff originally claimed that he is Mac McClung's cousin by way of their mothers being sisters, this has been denied by Mac McClung in an interview.
