= Abingdon High School (Virginia) =

Public high school in Virginia, United States

Location
- 705 Thompson Drive; Abingdon, Virginia 24210; United States; 36°43′5.9″N 81°57′26.3″W

Information
- School type: Public, high school
- Founded: 1959
- School district: Washington County Public Schools
- Superintendent: Keith Perrigan
- Principal: Mrs. Leslie Cumbow
- Faculty: 101
- Grades: 9-12
- Enrollment: 944 (2016-17)
- Language: English
- Colors: Navy & White
- Athletics conference: Southwest District; AAA Region IV
- Mascot: Falcons
- Rival: Patrick Henry HS; Virginia HS; John S. Battle HS
- Communities served: 1457
- Feeder schools: E.B. Stanley Middle School
- Website: Official Site

Abingdon High School is a public high school located in Abingdon, Virginia, United States. The school focuses on academics while supporting extracurricular activities such as athletics, the arts, clubs and community involvement.

== Academics ==
Abingdon offers college and career preparation courses. The school offers many Advanced Placement courses including Biology, Chemistry, United States History, Government, English 11, English 12, and Calculus. Dual enrollment classes are offered through the nearby Virginia Highlands Community College (VHCC). These courses include VHCC Calculus, VHCC Geology, and VHCC Computer Software. A. Linwood Holton's Governor's school offers classes in western civilization, statistics, anatomy, world civilizations and astronomy.

== Extracurricular activities ==
The school newspaper is the Talon, the yearbook is The Beacon and the literary magazine is Wings.

=== Wachovia Cup ===
Abingdon High School has won the Central Fidelity/Wachovia Cup in Group AA Academics 15 times, setting the state record for most championships. Abingdon won 9 consecutive championships from 1990 to 1998. The Central Fidelity/Wachovia Cup, which was started in 1989, is awarded by the Virginia High School League.

=== Athletics ===
Abingdon competes in the Mountain 7 District and AAA Region 3D of the Virginia High School League. Abingdon is the 2nd Smallest AAA school. Abingdon is competitive in golf, baseball, girls basketball and girls tennis.

=== State championships ===
- Volleyball: 1983
- Girls Cross Country: 1988
- Girls Outdoor Track & Field: 1994
- Golf: 2000 2015 2017
- Girls Tennis: 2017

== Notable alumni ==
- Scott Cooper (1988) – director and actor
- Doug Blevins (1981) – NFL kicking coach: Jets, Patriots, Miami Dolphins, and Minnesota Vikings
- Rick Boucher (1964) – Representative to Congress for Virginia's 9th district
- Gail Harris – Former MLB player (New York Giants, Detroit Tigers)
