= Clinch Mountain District =

US high school sports association district

The Clinch Mountain District was a district of the Virginia High School League. The league's mission was to establish and maintain "standards for student activities and competitions that promote education, personal growth, sportsmanship, leadership and citizenship." The secondary schools within the district compete in various events, predominantly athletics. The district was formed as part of a comprehensive redistricting plan to balance the four regions competing in Groups A and AA.

The district's initial five-member schools were Gate City High School, John S. Battle High School, Lebanon High School, Lee High School, and Virginia High School. All five secondary schools are located in Southwestern Virginia either along or to the northwest of Interstate 81. As of the 2006 realignment, the student enrollments of the schools were as follows: Battle, 638; Gate City, 599; Lebanon, 575; Lee, 840; and Virginia, 730.

Lee High had an enrollment that would normally be put in Group AA. However, by 2007, several nearby schools had dropped down to Group A due to declining enrollment. The nearest AA schools were now in Marion, Bristol and Abingdon—more than an hour and a half away. Thus, a travel hardship was declared, allowing Lee to play in Group A.

Virginia High School was also assigned to play in Group AA. The school had successfully appealed the assignment to the Lonesome Pine District of Group A during the 2005 redistricting plan, but this time chose not to appeal. With Lee and Virginia out of the district, the old Highlands District had only two member schools, both of which were assigned to the Southwest District, according to the state's 2007-08 and 2008-09 Final Alignment Plan.

Gate City High School was taken from the Lonesome Pine District and reunited with rival schools Lee and Virginia. The move was necessary to balance the district.

John S. Battle and Lebanon high schools were taken from the Hogoheegee District of Group A and placed within the A Clinch Mountain District. Both schools were in Group AA during the early 1990s but have been in Group A for more than a decade. While those schools tried to stay in the Hogoheegee district, the appeals were denied by the Virginia High School League.

2007-2008 District Officers Chairman: Ina Danko, Virginia High School Vice-Chairman: Tony Dodi, Lebanon High School Secretary: Jeff Hawkins, John S. Battle High School Treasurer: Ina Danko, Virginia High School

The Clinch Mountain District was dissolved in 2015 to create the newly formed Mountain District.

== Sources ==
Adopted 2007-08 and 2008-09 Alignment Plan, VHSL History, Virginia High School League website (Accessed March 1, 2008.).
