= Phil Rogers (Canadian football) =

American football player (born 1954)

Profile
- Position: Running back

Personal information
- Born: June 30, 1954 (age 72); Kingsport, Tennessee, U.S.
- Listed height: 5 ft 10 in (1.78 m)
- Listed weight: 185 lb (84 kg)

Career information
- High school: Gate City (Gate City, Virginia)
- College: Virginia Tech (1972–1975)
- NFL draft: 1976: 7th round, 203rd overall pick

Career history
- St. Louis Cardinals (1976)*; New York Jets (1976)*; Winnipeg Blue Bombers (1977)*; Toronto Argonauts (1978)
- * Offseason or practice squad member only

Phil Rogers (born June 30, 1954) is an American former football running back. He played college football at Virginia Tech, and was selected by the St. Louis Cardinals in the seventh round of the 1976 NFL draft. He played professionally in the Canadian Football League.

== Early life ==
Phil Rogers was born on June 30, 1954, in Kingsport, Tennessee. He attended Gate City High School in Gate City, Virginia.

== College career ==
Rogers played college football for the Virginia Tech Gobblers. As a true freshman in 1972, he returned four kickoffs for 74 yards for the varsity team but spent most of the year on the junior varsity team. He was a three-year varsity letterman from 1973 to 1975. In 1973, Rogers rushed 175 times for 1,036 yards and one touchdown, becoming the first 1,000-yard rusher in school history. He also caught 27 passes for 97 yards, and completed four of seven passes for 185 yards, two touchdowns, and one interception. He ran out of the wishbone formation as a junior in 1974, rushing for a team-leading 663 yards and seven touchdowns. Rogers became a triple option quarterback in 1975. He started all 11 games at quarterback during the 1975 season, totaling 25 completions on 53 passing attempts (47.2%) for 379 yards, three touchdowns, and three interceptions, and 200 rushing attempts for 762 yards and nine touchdowns. He was the first African-American starting quarterback in school history.

Rogers' 528 carries and 2,461 rushing yards were both school career records. He played in the Blue–Gray Football Classic after his senior year. He was inducted into the Virginia Tech Sports Hall of Fame in 2011.

== Professional career ==
Rogers was selected in the St. Louis Cardinals in the seventh round, with the 203rd overall pick, of the 1976 NFL draft. He was cut by the Cardinals and signed by the New York Jets. However, he was released by the Jets in late August 1976.

Rogers signed with the Winnipeg Blue Bombers of the Canadian Football League (CFL) in 1977. He was released in late June 1977.

Rogers signed with the CFL's Toronto Argonauts for the 1978 season. He dressed in four games for the Argonauts, rushing 25 times for 105 yards while also catching 13 passes for 86 yards. He was released on September 20, 1978.

== Personal life ==
Rogers worked in the Radford Army Ammunition Plant for over 30 years.
