= Phil Rogers (disambiguation) =

Phil Rogers may refer to:

- Phil Rogers (born 1971), Australian swimmer
- Phil Rogers (potter) (1951–2020), Welsh potter
- Phil Rogers (Canadian football) (born 1954), American player of Canadian football
