= Gate City Historic District =

Historic district in Virginia, United States

- U.S. National Register of Historic Places
- U.S. Historic district
- Virginia Landmarks Register
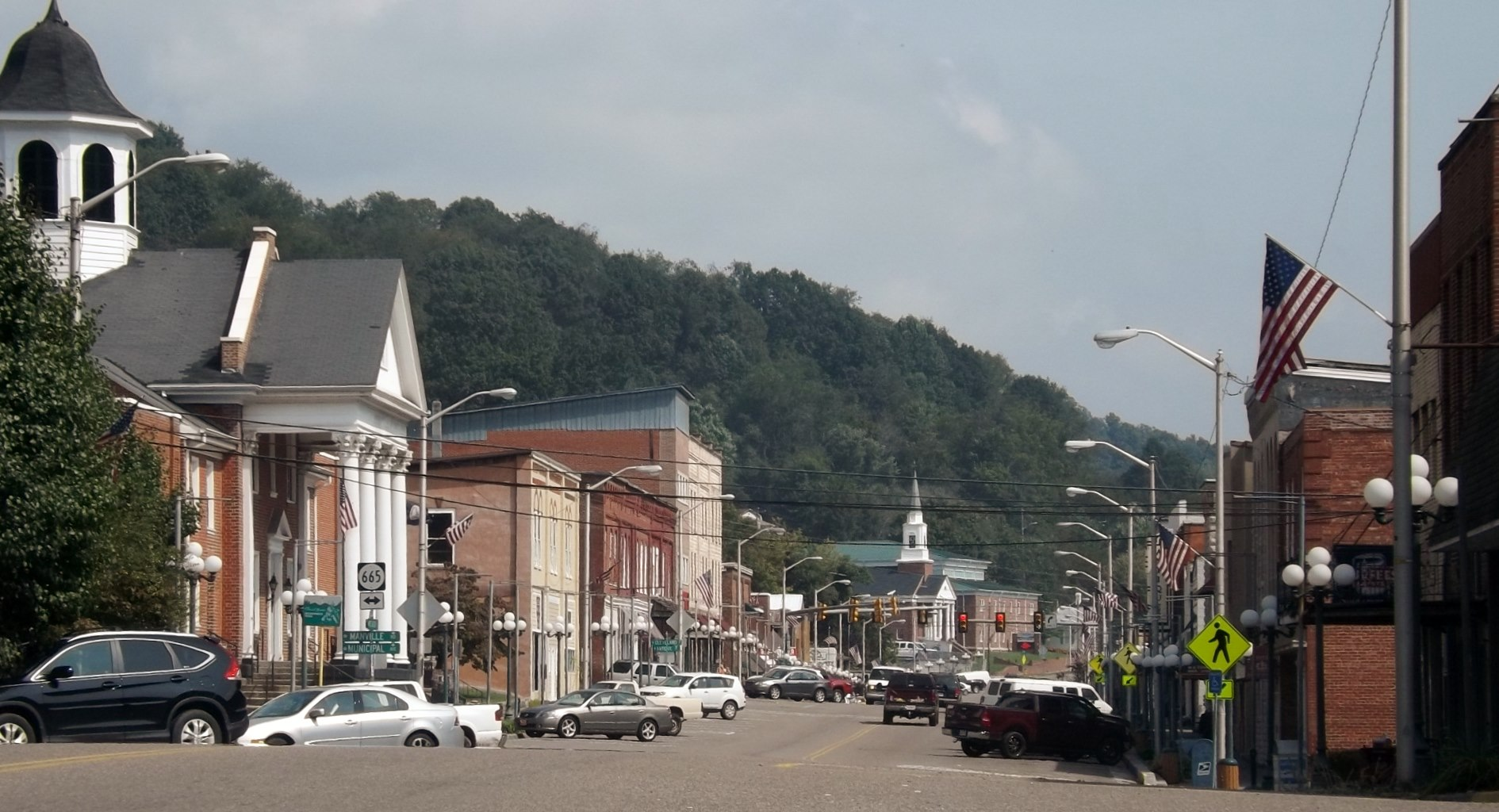
- Gate City Historic District, September 2013

- Location within Virginia Location within the United States
- Location: Five blocks east and west Jackson St., Gate City, Virginia
- Coordinates: 36.63881°N 82.57958°W
- Area: 12.84 acres (5.20 ha)
- Built: c. 1829
- Architectural style: Greek Revival, Colonial Revival, Tudor Revival, Bungalow/Craftsman
- NRHP reference No.: 10000735
- VLR No.: 221-5010

Significant dates
- Added to NRHP: September 10, 2010
- Designated VLR: June 17, 2010

Gate City Historic District is a national historic district located at Gate City, Scott County, Virginia. It contains 47 contributing buildings in the central business district of Gate City. Most contributing resources consist of commercial, residential, and governmental buildings dating from the late-19th and early-20th centuries. They are in a variety of popular architectural styles including Greek Revival, Colonial Revival, Tudor Revival, and Bungalow. Notable buildings include the Scott County Courthouse (1829), Library (c. 1940), Gate City Movie Theater (c. 1925) only the front facade remains, and Jail (c. 1829).

It was listed on the National Register of Historic Places in 2010.
