= 2024–25 NBA G League season =

American basketball season

- League: NBA G League
- Sport: Basketball
- Duration: November 8, 2024 – April 14, 2025
- Teams: 31

Draft
- Top draft pick: Matt Ryan
- Picked by: Westchester Knicks

Regular season
- Top seed: Osceola Magic; Stockton Kings
- Season MVP: JD Davison (Maine Celtics)

Finals
- Champions: Stockton Kings
- Runners-up: Osceola Magic
- Finals MVP: Mason Jones (Kings)

NBA G League seasons
- ← 2023–24 2025–26 →

The 2024–25 NBA G League season was the 24th season of the NBA G League, the minor league basketball league of the National Basketball Association (NBA).

The season consists of each team playing 16 Tip–Off Tournament games starting November 8, followed by the top eight teams playing in the Winter Showcase, which is then followed by 34 regular-season games for each team starting December 27. The Winter Showcase concluded on December 22 with the Westchester Knicks defeating the Sioux Falls Skyforce in the final.

== League changes ==
For the start of the 2024–25 season, the NBA G League added one new franchise, lost one franchise, and relocated another franchise:

- The Ontario Clippers relocated to San Diego and rebranded as the San Diego Clippers.
- The NBA shut down the franchise NBA G League Ignite after four seasons.
- Phoenix launched its new G League affiliate, the Valley Suns, this season in Tempe, Arizona, becoming the 31st NBA G League franchise. All 30 NBA franchises have their own G League affiliates for the first time ever.
- The Showcase Cup was renamed to the Tip–Off Tournament.

== International Draft ==
On July 10, 2024, the league organized an International Draft for foreign players.

| Pick | Player | Position | Nationality | Team |
|---|---|---|---|---|
| 1st | Sarem Jafari | F | Iran | Texas Legends |
| 2nd | Kenny Kasiama | F | France | Salt Lake City Stars |
| 3rd | Milhan Charles | F | France | San Diego Clippers |
| 4th | Isaac Nogués | G | Spain | Rip City Remix |

== Tip–Off Tournament ==
=== East Division ===
| Pos | Team | W | L | PCT | GB |
|---|---|---|---|---|---|
| 1 | Westchester Knicks (NYK) | 13 | 4 | .765 | — |
| 2 | Capital City Go-Go (WAS) | 11 | 5 | .688 | 1.5 |
| 3 | Greensboro Swarm (CHA) | 11 | 5 | .688 | 1.5 |
| 4 | College Park Skyhawks (ATL) | 9 | 7 | .563 | 3.5 |
| 5 | Delaware Blue Coats (PHI) | 9 | 7 | .563 | 3.5 |
| 6 | Maine Celtics (BOS) | 8 | 8 | .500 | 4.5 |
| 7 | Raptors 905 (TOR) | 5 | 11 | .313 | 7.5 |
| 8 | Long Island Nets (BKN) | 2 | 14 | .125 | 10.5 |

Source: GLeague.NBA.com

=== Central Division ===
| Pos | Team | W | L | PCT | GB |
|---|---|---|---|---|---|
| 1 | Iowa Wolves (MIN) | 12 | 4 | .750 | — |
| 2 | Sioux Falls Skyforce (MIA) | 12 | 5 | .706 | 0.5 |
| 3 | Grand Rapids Gold (DEN) | 11 | 5 | .688 | 1 |
| 4 | Cleveland Charge (CLE) | 7 | 9 | .438 | 5 |
| 5 | Motor City Cruise (DET) | 7 | 9 | .438 | 5 |
| 6 | Indiana Mad Ants (IND) | 7 | 9 | .438 | 5 |
| 7 | Windy City Bulls (CHI) | 5 | 11 | .313 | 7 |
| 8 | Wisconsin Herd (MIL) | 3 | 13 | .188 | 9 |

Source: GLeague.NBA.com

=== South Division ===
| Pos | Team | W | L | PCT | GB |
|---|---|---|---|---|---|
| 1 | Oklahoma City Blue (OKC) | 12 | 4 | .750 | — |
| 2 | Austin Spurs (SAS) | 10 | 6 | .625 | 2 |
| 3 | Mexico City Capitanes | 9 | 7 | .563 | 3 |
| 4 | Rio Grande Valley Vipers (HOU) | 8 | 8 | .500 | 4 |
| 5 | Memphis Hustle (MEM) | 6 | 10 | .375 | 6 |
| 6 | Birmingham Squadron (NO) | 6 | 10 | .375 | 6 |
| 7 | Texas Legends (DAL) | 6 | 10 | .375 | 6 |
| 8 | Osceola Magic (ORL) | 5 | 11 | .313 | 7 |

Source: GLeague.NBA.com

=== West Division ===
| Pos | Team | W | L | PCT | GB |
|---|---|---|---|---|---|
| 1 | San Diego Clippers (LAC) | 10 | 6 | .625 | — |
| 2 | Valley Suns (PHX) | 10 | 6 | .625 | — |
| 3 | Stockton Kings (SAC) | 10 | 6 | .625 | — |
| 4 | Salt Lake City Stars (UTA) | 8 | 8 | .500 | 2 |
| 5 | Santa Cruz Warriors (GSW) | 7 | 9 | .438 | 3 |
| 6 | South Bay Lakers (LAL) | 5 | 11 | .313 | 5 |
| 7 | Rip City Remix (POR) | 5 | 11 | .313 | 5 |

Source: GLeague.NBA.com

=== Winter Showcase Cup ===
Quarterfinals; December 19
1 | Oklahoma City Blue | 110
8 | Grand Rapids Gold | 124
4 | Westchester Knicks | 127
5 | Valley Suns | 119
3 | Sioux Falls Skyforce | 112
6 | Capital City Go-Go | 108
2 | Iowa Wolves | 124
7 | Stockton Kings | 99

Semifinals; December 21
8 | Grand Rapids Gold | 108
4 | Westchester Knicks | 113
3 | Sioux Falls Skyforce | 117
2 | Iowa Wolves | 104

Showcase Cup Championship; December 22
4 | Westchester Knicks | 125
3 | Sioux Falls Skyforce | 119

== Standings ==
=== Eastern Conference ===
| Pos | Team | W | L | PCT | GB |
|---|---|---|---|---|---|
| 1 | Osceola Magic (ORL) | 22 | 12 | .647 | — |
| 2 | Westchester Knicks (NYK) | 22 | 12 | .647 | — |
| 3 | Maine Celtics (BOS) | 21 | 13 | .618 | 1 |
| 4 | Indiana Mad Ants (IND) | 20 | 14 | .588 | 2 |
| 5 | Greensboro Swarm (CHA) | 20 | 14 | .588 | 2 |
| 6 | Capital City Go-Go (WAS) | 20 | 14 | .588 | 2 |
| 7 | Motor City Cruise (DET) | 19 | 15 | .559 | 3 |
| 8 | Wisconsin Herd (MIL) | 19 | 15 | .559 | 3 |
| 9 | College Park Skyhawks (ATL) | 17 | 17 | .500 | 5 |
| 10 | Long Island Nets (BKN) | 17 | 17 | .500 | 5 |
| 11 | Cleveland Charge (CLE) | 16 | 18 | .471 | 6 |
| 12 | Grand Rapids Gold (DEN) | 15 | 19 | .441 | 7 |
| 13 | Delaware Blue Coats (PHI) | 14 | 20 | .412 | 8 |
| 14 | Raptors 905 (TOR) | 13 | 21 | .382 | 9 |
| 15 | Birmingham Squadron (NO) | 12 | 22 | .353 | 10 |
| 16 | Windy City Bulls (CHI) | 11 | 23 | .324 | 11 |

=== Western Conference ===
| Pos | Team | W | L | PCT | GB |
|---|---|---|---|---|---|
| 1 | Stockton Kings (SAC) | 22 | 12 | .647 | — |
| 2 | Austin Spurs (SAS) | 22 | 12 | .647 | — |
| 3 | Salt Lake City Stars (UTA) | 21 | 13 | .618 | 1 |
| 4 | Santa Cruz Warriors (GSW) | 20 | 14 | .588 | 2 |
| 5 | Valley Suns (PHX) | 20 | 14 | .588 | 2 |
| 6 | Rio Grande Valley Vipers (HOU) | 20 | 14 | .588 | 2 |
| 7 | Oklahoma City Blue (OKC) | 18 | 16 | .529 | 4 |
| 8 | Sioux Falls Skyforce (MIA) | 18 | 16 | .529 | 4 |
| 9 | South Bay Lakers (LAL) | 16 | 18 | .471 | 6 |
| 10 | Mexico City Capitanes | 16 | 18 | .471 | 6 |
| 11 | Memphis Hustle (MEM) | 15 | 19 | .441 | 7 |
| 12 | Rip City Remix (POR) | 14 | 20 | .412 | 8 |
| 13 | San Diego Clippers (LAC) | 12 | 22 | .353 | 10 |
| 14 | Texas Legends (DAL) | 8 | 26 | .235 | 14 |
| 15 | Iowa Wolves (MIN) | 7 | 27 | .206 | 15 |

== Playoffs ==
- First Round: April 1
- Conference Semifinals: April 3
- Conference Finals: April 6
- NBA G League Finals: April 8, April 11, April 14

Conference Quarterfinals | Conference Semifinals
1 | Osceola Magic | 129
4 | Indiana Mad Ants | 114
4 | Indiana Mad Ants | 120
5 | Greensboro Swarm | 110
Eastern Conference
2 | Westchester Knicks | 118
3 | Maine Celtics | 124
3 | Maine Celtics | 115
6 | Capital City Go-Go | 95
1 | Stockton Kings | 122
5 | Valley Suns | 114
4 | Santa Cruz Warriors | 127
5 | Valley Suns | 131
Western Conference
2 | Austin Spurs | 123
3 | Salt Lake City Stars | 113
3 | Salt Lake City Stars | 129
6 | Rio Grande Valley Vipers | 102

Conference Finals
1 | Osceola Magic | 135
3 | Maine Celtics | 122
1 | Stockton Kings | 118
2 | Austin Spurs | 112

Finals; Best-of-three
1 | Osceola Magic | 129 | 126 | 110
1 | Stockton Kings | 118 | 144 | 118

=== Finals boxscore ===
April 8, 2025
8:00 p.m. ET

Boxscore

Stockton Kings 118, Osceola Magic 129
Scoring by quarter: 30–32, 30–28, 27–38, 31–31
| Pts: Terry Taylor 28; Rebs: Skal Labissiere 10; Asts: Mason Jones 5 | Pts: Myron Gardner 30; Rebs: Alex Morales 11; Asts: Mac McClung, Alex Morales 7 |

Silver Spurs Arena, Kissimmee, Florida
Attendance: 1,724
Referees:
- #77 Jenna Reneau
- #45 Biniam Maru
- #73 Pat O'Connell
- #72 Marcy Williams

April 11, 2025
10:00 p.m. ET

Boxscore

Osceola Magic 126, Stockton Kings 144
Scoring by quarter: 32–41, 43–27, 29–42, 22–34
| Pts: Mac McClung 33; Rebs: Alex Morales 7 Asts: Mac McClung 8 | Pts: Mason Jones 27; Rebs: Brian Bowen II, Terry Taylor 10; Asts: Mason Jones 12 |

Adventist Health Arena, Stockton, California
Attendance: 4,194
Referees:
- #41 Tyler Mirkovich
- #34 Brent Haskill
- #45 Biniam Maru
- #72 Marcy Williams

April 14, 2025
8:00 p.m. ET

Boxscore

Stockton Kings 118, Osceola Magic 110
| Pts: Dexter Dennis 23; Rebs: Isaac Jones 13; Asts: Mason Jones 13 | Pts: Ethan Thompson 28; Rebs: Myron Gardner 14; Asts: Mac McClung, Jarrett Culver 5 |
Stockton Kings win 2–1

Silver Spurs Arena, Kissimmee, Florida
Attendance: 3,421
Referees:
- #77 Jenna Reneau
- #41 Tyler Mirkovich
- #34 Brent Haskill
- #73 Pat O'Connell

== Media ==
Nationally, NBA G League games are broadcast on ESPN, NBA TV, The Roku Channel and Tubi.

Locally games are aired on the following networks:

| Team | Network | Notes/Source |
|---|---|---|
| Austin Spurs | FanDuel Sports Network Southwest | |
| Birmingham Squadron | WABM | |
| Capital City Go-Go | Monumental Sports Network | |
| Cleveland Charge | Rock Entertainment Sports Network | |
| College Park Skyhawks | WPCH-TV | |
| Delaware Blue Coats | DETV 28; WPSG | |
| Greensboro Swarm | WMYV (4 games) | |
| Long Island Nets | YES Network | |
| Maine Celtics | NBC Sports Boston | |
| Motor City Cruise | Facebook | |
| Osceola Magic | FanDuel Sports Network Sun | 26 games |
| Rio Grande Valley Vipers | KRGV-DT3 | |
| Salt Lake City Stars | Jazz+ | |
| San Diego Clippers | ClipperVision; YurView California | 50 games on ClipperVision |
| Santa Cruz Warriors | NBC Sports Bay Area | |
| Sioux Falls Skyforce | FanDuel Sports Network Sun | |
| South Bay Lakers | Spectrum SportsNet | |
| Texas Legends | KFAA-TV; Urban Edge Network | |
| Valley Suns | Arizona's Family Sports; Suns Live | 24 home games on Arizona's Family Sports |
| Westchester Knicks | MSG Network | |
| Windy City Bulls | Chicago Sports Network | |
| Wisconsin Herd | WACY-TV | |
