= Lee County Public Schools (Virginia) =

School district in Virginia, United States

Address
- 155 Vo Tech Drive Jonesville, Virginia, 24263; United States
- Coordinates: 36.7311°N 83.0873°W

District information
- Type: Public
- Grades: Pre-K through 12
- Superintendent: Brian Dean
- School board: 5 members
- Chair of the board: Vera Ely
- Governing agency: Virginia Department of Education
- Schools: 11

Other information
- Website: sites.google.com/leecoschools.com/lcps

Lee County Public Schools is a school division in Virginia that serves students in Lee County, Virginia. Located in the westernmost part of the state, the district serves almost 3,000 students and administers 11 schools: five elementary schools, three middle schools, two high schools, a career and technical education center. The district also operates a HeadStart program.

== Administration ==
The Superintendent of Lee County Public Schools is Brian Dean. Prior to his appointment in 2021, he was the district's assistant superintendent.

The Lee County Public School Board has five members:

- Tim Vanadore - District 1
- Rob Hines - District 2, Vice Chair
- Nancy Garret - District 3
- Vera Ely - District 4, Chair
- Garry Williams - District 5

== Schools ==
Lee County Public Schools operates five elementary schools, three middle schools, two high schools, a career and technical education center, and a HeadStart program.

=== High Schools (Grades 8-12) ===
- Lee High School
- Thomas Walker High School

=== Middle Schools (Grades 6-7) ===
- Elydale Middle School
- Jonesville Middle School
- Pennington Middle School

=== Elementary Schools (Grades K-5) ===
- Dryden Elementary School
- Flatwoods Elementary School
- Elk Knob Elementary School
- Rose Hill Elementary School
- St. Charles Elementary School

=== Other Schools ===
- Lee County Career and Technical Education Center
