= Virginia High School (Virginia) =

Location
- 650 Long Crescent Dr; Bristol, Virginia 24201; United States; 36°36′55.6″N 82°10′42.7″W

Information
- School type: Public, high school
- Founded: 1895
- School district: Bristol Virginia Public Schools
- Superintendent: David Scott
- Principal: Mark Price
- Grades: 9-12
- Enrollment: 670 (2019-20)
- Language: English
- Color: Black Orange
- Athletics: Baseball, Basketball, Cheerleading, Cross-Country, Football, Golf, Soccer, Softball, Swimming & Diving, Tennis, Track, Volleyball, Wrestling, eSports
- Athletics conference: Clinch Mountain District; Region D
- Mascot: Bearcat
- Rival: John S. Battle High School; Tennessee High School; Abingdon High School
- Feeder schools: Virginia Middle School
- Website: Official Site

Virginia High School is a high school located in Bristol, Virginia. In 1999, Virginia High started offering the Tri-Cities area's first International Baccalaureate Diploma Programme. Classes from the Advanced Placement program are also offered to help students who are headed to college. A career and technical wing was added to the main school building to help students who wish to go into a trade straight from high school. Courses offered for this path include: culinary arts, cybersecurity, engineering and manufacturing, coding, business, horticulture, auto-mechanics, building trades, and nursing.

Activities include: athletics, academic teams, Spring Festival, and Queen of Hearts. The Spring Festival is an event where students can showcase talent and art combined with a beauty pageant to choose Mr. and Miss Virginia High. The Queen of Hearts Program is an event every February where students at Virginia High, Bristol Tennessee High School, John S. Battle High School, and Abingdon High School compete to raise money for the American Heart Association. Virginia High offers competition on academic teams via the Virginia High School League Scholastic Bowl and Southwest Academic Conference (SWAC). Forensics, robotics, literary magazine, yearbook, and drama are other way for students to showcase their speech and intellectual abilities.

== History ==
From 1914 to 1953 Virginia High School was located on Piedmont Avenue in the building that now houses Virginia Middle School. This original building designed by Clarence Kearfott is listed with the National Register of Historic Places and as a Virginia Historic Landmark.

In 1954, Virginia High School started classes in its current building on Long Crescent Drive which was designed by architect A.L. Aydelott of Memphis, Tennessee.

== Athletics ==
=== Baseball ===
Virginia High has been to 12 state baseball championship finals and won 7 championships (more than any other active VHSL school) as detailed below. Virginia High plays baseball at Devault Memorial Stadium which it shares with the Bristol State Liners.

Baseball State Championship Games
Year	Winning Team		Losing Team		Class
1981	Virginia	4	Colonial Heights	0	AA
1983	Virginia	1	Mills E. Godwin	0	AA
1985	Midlothian	10	Virginia	7	AA
1986	Waynesboro	2	Virginia	0	AA
1992	Virginia	4	Harrisonburg	3	AA
1993	Virginia	1	Turner Ashby	0	AA
1996	Virginia	7	Nansemond River	2	AA
1998	Dan River	5	Virginia	4	AA
2010	Rappahonnock	7	Virginia	4	A
2014	Virginia	7	Strasburg	2	2A
2015	Virginia	16	Lebanon	8	2A
2018	Page County	5	Virginia	4	2A

=== Football ===
Virginia High plays football at Gene Malcolm Stadium which is adjacent to Devault Memorial Stadium. The original venue for football was Bristol Municipal Stadium which was shared with Tennessee High School. Virginia High has won AA state football championships in 1927 and 1933. The Bearcats won the Division III, Region IV Championship in 1987 under head coach Paul Wheeler, who coached the Bearcats from 1984-1990 and 2011-2012. The current head coach is Michael Crist, who was hired in 2013. In first season as head coach, Crist led the Bearcats to a 6-6 record, which featured a 1st round-upset against traditional power Gretna (45-40) and a 37-34 triple-overtime loss to Richlands in Round 2 of the 2A playoffs.

=== Other sports ===
Virginia High has won two state II boys' basketball championships in 1916 and 1927. Virginia High won boys' state AA cross-country championships in 1979 and 1980 and girls' AA cross-country championships in 1980 and 1981. Virginia High won state AA boys' tennis championships in 1977 and 1980. The school won girls' outdoor track championships in 1978, 1980, and 1981. The school's boys soccer team also won the Clinch Mountain District championship in Spring 2008 and have repeated again in Spring of 2009. The girls soccer team in 2008 not only won the Clinch Mountain District championship but advanced to the State semi-final game before falling. In 2009, the girls finished the regular season undefeated, winning the regular season and tournament championships.

== Academic competition ==
Virginia High competes in the Southwest Academic Conference (SWAC) and VHSL Scholastic Bowl. The all around team is coached by all of the coaches. Virginia High holds SWAC championships in Math (2005–2007), Science (2003, 2004, 2006, 2009), and Social Studies (2001). Virginia High School discontinued SWAC Competition after the 2009 season.

In VHSL Scholastic Bowl competition, Virginia High finished fourth in Region D, second in the Clinch Mountain District in 2011-12; and they were Clinch Mountain District Regular Season and Tournament Champions in 2012-13, placing 4th at the Region D Tournament.

== Music education ==
Virginia High has been awarded the Virginia Music Educators Association Blue Ribbon School for Music: 2004, 2007, 2009, 2016, 2018, 2019. The VHS Chorale earned straight Superior ratings at District VII Choral Assessment for the 14th consecutive year as of 2019.

== Notable alumni ==
- Kevin Barker - professional baseball player, All-American at Virginia Tech (1996)
- Greg Barrett - American nonfiction author, screenwriter, public speaker, and former newspaper and wire journalist
- Carl Brown, Ph.D.- Director, Grand Valley State University Speech Lab; National Outstanding Communication Consultant (2013)
- Bobby Carter - Tennessee State Senator
- Aaron Cole - Rapper, songwriter.
- Beattie Feathers - NFL Running Back (1934–40) & College (University of Tennessee) Football Hall of Fame Inductee, First Professional Running Back to rush for over 1,000 yards in a single season
- Ian Frye - University of Virginia placekicker (2012-2015), Lou Groza semi-finalist, 2d Team All-ACC
- Justin Grimm - Pitcher at the University of Georgia and currently a Relief Pitcher with the Kansas City Royals. Won the World Series with the Chicago Cubs
- Crystal Hurd, Ed.D. - Author, public speaker, musician, and researcher. (1997)
- Dave Loggins - singer, songwriter
- Gene McEver - All-American Football Player at the University of Tennessee (1929), College Football Hall of Fame Inductee
- Chase Owens - Class of 2008 - Professional wrestler
- Thorton "Bean" Stringfellow - Atlanta Braves Minor League (1985–89) & Virginia Tech Baseball Pitcher
- Gene "Pappy" Thompson - Sports Writer, Tennessee Sports Hall of Fame & Virginia Sports Wall of Fame
- Alex Walls- University of Tennessee Place Kicker (1999–2002), All-American (2001)
- William Wampler - U.S. House of Representatives (1953–83)
- William C. Wampler, Jr. - Class of 1977 - Current Virginia State Senator
- Darryal Wilson - University of Tennessee Wide Receiver (1979–82), 2nd Round Draft Pick by New England Patriots (1983)
