= Lee High School (Lee County, Virginia) =

Location
- 200 Generals Lane; Jonesville, Virginia 24263; United States
- 36°43′52″N 83°05′20″W

Information
- School type: Public, high school
- Founded: 1989
- School district: Lee County Public Schools
- Principal: Brian Coomer
- Grades: 8–12
- Enrollment: 667 (2019–20)
- Language: English
- Campus: Rural
- Colors: Red and gold
- Athletics conference: Mountain 7 Region D
- Team name: Generals
- Rival: Thomas Walker High School, Gate City High School, Union High School
- Website: sites.google.com/view/leehighschool/home

Lee High School is a public high school located in Lee County, Virginia, United States, near the town of Jonesville. It is a part of the Lee County Public Schools and is one of two high schools in the county.

== History ==
Founded in 1989, Lee High School was formed by consolidating Jonesville High School, Dryden High School, Keokee High School, Flatwoods High School, and Pennington High School.

== Athletics ==
The football team made the state playoffs in 1989, 1990, 2013, 2014, and 2015.

Lee High dropped from Group AA to Group A status in the 2007-2008 year (granted due to "travel hardship"). Lee's former district, the AA Highlands District, was dissolved with two members moving to the AA Southwest District and another school moving down with Lee and joining a new district. This new district, which is a part of A Region D, is the A Clinch Mountain District.

The 1990 Golf team is the first team to win a state championship for the school, in VHSL Group AA. The boys tennis team was Group A state runner-up in 2011. The Boys Golf team won state in 2023.

In 2008, Lee High's Scholastic Bowl team (part of the VHSL) finished 3rd at the Group A VHSL State Tournament.

Lee High has All State Football alumni in Brady Yeary/RB, Leon Brewer/RB, David Edwards/OL, and Brett Clark QB/DB.

== Vocational classes ==
Lee High School offers students elective vocational classes located in the Lee County Career and Technical Center building. Classes include: Agriculture, Auto Body Repair, Building Maintenance, Building Trade, Business Ed., Childcare, Cosmetology, Criminology, Culinary Arts, Drafting, Electricity, Family Consumer Science, Farm Machine Repair, Horticulture, Small Animal Care, Marketing, Networking, Nursing, Small Engine Repair, Technology Ed., and Welding.

Also offered at Lee High School is Navy JROTC.
