= Jimmy Gobble =

American baseball player (born 1981)

- Pitcher
- Born: July 19, 1981 (age 44); Bristol, Tennessee, U.S.
- Batted: Left Threw: Left

MLB debut
- August 3, 2003, for the Kansas City Royals

Last MLB appearance
- July 9, 2009, for the Chicago White Sox

MLB statistics
- Win–loss record: 22–23
- Earned run average: 5.29
- Strikeouts: 285
- Stats at Baseball Reference

Teams
- Kansas City Royals (2003–2008); Chicago White Sox (2009)

Billy James Gobble (born July 19, 1981) is an American former professional baseball pitcher. He played in Major League Baseball (MLB) for the Kansas City Royals and Chicago White Sox.

== High school career ==
Gobble attended John S. Battle High School in Bristol, Virginia and started four years on the varsity team. He led the team to three state tournament appearances and compiled a 32–8 record and 512 strikeouts.

As a senior, Gobble was 10–1 with a 0.49 earned run average (ERA), striking out 151 and allowing just 23 hits in 71 innings of work. His only loss came at the hands of Sullivan East High School, which is located in nearby Bluff City, Tennessee. He was also a strong hitter, compiling a .493 batting average with nine home runs, 30 RBI and 24 walks.

Gobble signed a baseball scholarship with the University of Kentucky before being drafted by the Royals with the 43rd pick in the 1999 Major League Baseball draft. He was the fourth Royal chosen, following Kyle Snyder, Mike MacDougal, and Jay Gehrke.

== Professional career ==
=== Kansas City Royals ===
Gobble made his professional debut in 1999 with the Rookie-level Gulf Coast League Royals, posting a 2.70 ERA in four games (one start). He was promoted to the Single-A Charleston Alley Cats for the 2000 season, and finished 12–10 with a 3.66 ERA and three complete games (two shutouts) in 25 starts. In 2001, Gobble had perhaps his best minor league season while pitching for the High-A Wilmington Blue Rocks, going 10–6 with a 2.55 ERA in 27 starts. He also struck out 154 batters while walking just 33 in 162 1/3 innings.

During the 2002 season, Gobble struggled with injury, limiting him to 13 starts with the Double-A Wichita Wranglers (5–7 record, 3.38 ERA). He was added to Kansas City's 40-man roster on November 18. Gobble returned to Wichita at the start of 2003, and pitched well, going 12–8 with a 3.19 ERA in 22 starts.

On August 3, 2003, Gobble made his major league debut with the Royals against the Tampa Bay Devil Rays. He finished with six scoreless innings, walking one and striking out three to earn the win. In his second start on August 6, he again defeated the Devil Rays, allowing seven hits and one earned run in Kansas City's 6–2 win. Gobble made nine starts with the Royals to close the 2003 season, going 4–5 with a 4.61 ERA.

Gobble was named the Royals' fourth starter to open 2004. On May 3, Gobble finished within one out of a complete game shutout against the Toronto Blue Jays, but after allowing two straight hits and a run, he was pulled for Royals closer Mike MacDougal, who went on to allow the tying run. The Royals still went on to win, 3–2. On July 29, Gobble was optioned to the Triple-A Omaha Royals following a rough stretch of starts. He returned a month later on August 29, allowing four runs (two earned) on five hits in 6 2/3 innings in a no-decision against the Seattle Mariners. In his next start on September 5, Gobble recorded his first career complete game in a 12–3 victory over the Minnesota Twins. In 25 games (24 starts), Gobble was 9–8 with a 5.35 ERA.

Gobble competed for the fifth starter job during spring training in 2005, but was not selected and opened the season in Triple-A Omaha. On June 20, Gobble was recalled and placed in Kansas City's bullpen. He ultimately finished the season with a record of 1–1 and a 5.70 ERA in 28 games (four starts). The next season, Gobble spent the entire year in the majors for the first time, and went 4–6 with two saves and a 5.14 ERA in 60 games (six starts).

In 2007, Gobble enjoyed a great season as Kansas City's primary left-handed specialist. He appeared in 74 games, the most on Kansas City's staff, and tied for fifth in the American League in that same category. Gobble posted a record of 4–1 with one save and a 3.02 ERA in his appearances.

On July 21, 2008, Gobble surrendered 10 runs to the Detroit Tigers in the eighth inning, setting a Kansas City franchise record for the most runs surrendered in a game by a relief pitcher. He finished the 2008 season with an 0–2 record, one save and an ERA of 8.81 in 39 relief appearances. Gobble missed some time during the season with a back injury, but after returning to the team in September, he had eight scoreless appearances to finish the season.

On January 19, 2009, Gobble signed a one-year, $1.35 million contract with the Royals to avoid arbitration. He was released by the Royals on March 18.

=== Texas Rangers ===
On March 21, 2009, the Texas Rangers signed Gobble to a minor league contract and invited him to Spring Training. He was released on March 30.

=== Chicago White Sox ===
On April 5, 2009, the Chicago White Sox signed Gobble to a minor league contract and assigned him to the Triple-A Charlotte Knights. He was promoted to the major league roster on May 11, taking the roster spot of struggling starter José Contreras. On July 7, he was designated for assignment. At the time, he had recorded a 7.50 ERA in 12 games.

=== Colorado Rockies ===
On January 28, 2010, Gobble signed a minor league contract with the Colorado Rockies with an invite to spring training. He did not allow a hit in three Cactus League outings and appeared to have locked up a spot as the team's left-handed specialist before suffering an injury.

He appeared in two games for the Triple-A Colorado Springs Sky Sox before retiring.

== Personal life ==
In 2017, Gobble was named as the head baseball coach at his alma mater, John S. Battle High School in Bristol, Virginia.
