= Myron Gardner =

American basketball player (born 2001)

No. 15 – Miami Heat
- Position: Shooting guard / small forward
- League: NBA

Personal information
- Born: May 21, 2001 (age 25) Detroit, Michigan, U.S.
- Listed height: 6 ft 5 in (1.96 m)
- Listed weight: 220 lb (100 kg)

Career information
- High school: Loyola (Detroit, Michigan); SPIRE Academy (Geneva, Ohio)
- College: Georgetown (2019–2020); South Plains (2020–2021); Little Rock (2021–2023)
- NBA draft: 2023: undrafted
- Playing career: 2023–present

Career history
- 2023–2025: Osceola Magic
- 2025–present: Miami Heat
- 2025–2026: →Sioux Falls Skyforce

Career highlights
- Second-team All-OVC (2023)
- Stats at NBA.com
- Stats at Basketball Reference

Myron Gardner (born May 21, 2001) is an American professional basketball player for the Miami Heat of the National Basketball Association (NBA). He played college basketball for the Georgetown Hoyas, the South Plains Texans and the Little Rock Trojans.

== High school career ==
Gardner initially attended Loyola High at Detroit, Michigan, before transferring to SPIRE Academy in Geneva, Ohio, where he averaged 18 points, finishing third on the team and was ranked 283rd nationally by 247Sports.com.

== College career ==
Gardner began his college career at Georgetown, where he played in eight of the first nine games of the 2019–20 season, averaging 3.1 points per game and after being accused in a civil complaint by a Georgetown student of assault and burglary, he transferred to South Plains where he averaged 13.8 points and 7.1 rebounds per game. After a thorough investigation of the complaint, no evidence was found to warrant any charges. The complaint is considered unfounded and has been closed.

After one year at South Plains, Gardner transferred to Little Rock, where he averaged 13.2 points, 9.1, rebounds, 3.6 assists and 1.2 steals in 30.8 minutes as a senior. He was the team's leader in rebounds and steals while being second in points, assists and minutes and third in both three point (35.6%) and free throw percentage (75.5%). He also was second team All-Ohio Valley Conference after leading the OVC with 15 double-doubles, tied for the second-most in a year in program history and was tied for eighth nationally while ending the regular season ranked 16th in the nation in defensive rebounds per game with 6.97, being 24th in total rebounds with 274 and 31st in rebounds per game, ranking second in the OVC in each category.

== Professional career ==
=== Osceola Magic (2023–2025) ===
After going undrafted in the 2023 NBA draft, Gardner joined the Osceola Magic on November 2, 2023, where he played in 47 games and averaged 5.4 points, 4.4 rebounds, and 1.1 assists in 15.4 minutes.

On July 7, 2024, Gardner joined the Orlando Magic for the 2024 NBA Summer League and on September 11, he signed with the team. However, he was waived on September 19 and eight days later, he joined the Osceola Magic.

=== Miami Heat (2025–present) ===
Gardner joined the Miami Heat for the 2025 NBA Summer League. On July 25, 2025, Gardner signed a two-way contract with the Heat. On February 18, 2026, Gardner signed a three-year, standard contract worth $5.5 million with the Heat after averaging 11 points, 8.5 rebounds, 2.3 assists, and 1.75 steals while shooting 55.2% from the field and 53.8% from the three-point line over four starts this season. On February 21, Gardner was involved in an altercation with Scotty Pippen Jr. during a 136–120 victory over the Memphis Grizzlies, one which resulted in both of their ejections; the pair were ultimately fined $35,000 each for the incident.

== Career statistics ==
Legend
GP	Games played	GS	Games started	MPG	Minutes per game
FG%	Field goal percentage	3P%	3-point field goal percentage	FT%	Free throw percentage
RPG	Rebounds per game	APG	Assists per game	SPG	Steals per game
BPG	Blocks per game	PPG	Points per game	**Bold**	Career high

=== NBA ===
Year	Team	GP	GS	MPG	FG%	3P%	FT%	RPG	APG	SPG	BPG	PPG
2025–26	Miami	45	7	9.1	.480	.406	.731	2.7	1.0	.4	.2	3.6
Career		45	7	9.1	.480	.406	.731	2.7	1.0	.4	.2	3.6
