= John S. Battle High School =

Location
- 21264 Battle Hill Drive; Bristol, Virginia 24202; United States; 36°38′33.9″N 82°6′14.5″W

Information
- School type: Public, high school
- Founded: 1959
- School district: Washington County Public Schools
- Superintendent: Dr. Keith Perrigan
- Principal: Mr. Jimmy King
- Grades: 9-12
- Enrollment: 611 (2016-17)
- Language: English
- Colors: Green, white, and gold
- Athletics conference: Mountain 7 District; Region D
- Mascot: Trojan
- Rival: Virginia High School Abingdon High School
- Newspaper: Trojan Voice
- Feeder schools: High Point Elementary and Valley Institute Elementary to Wallace Middle School
- Website: Official Site

John S. Battle High School is a high school located in the Southwest portion of Virginia in Washington County. Built in 1959, the school was named after former Virginia Governor John S. Battle.

== Extracurricular activities ==
=== Baseball ===
John Battle won the state championships for baseball in 2000 and 2001.

=== Volleyball ===
John Battle won the state championships for volleyball in 1989 and 1991.

=== Tennis ===
The John Battle Girls' Tennis team won the 2008 state championship.

=== Softball ===
Both John S Battle's Junior Varsity and Varsity had an undefeated 2021 regular season - after returning from covid. The Trojans made Back to back state appearances in 2023 and 2024.

== Notable alumni ==
- Jimmy Gobble, Kansas City Royals Pitcher
- Mike Helton, NASCAR
