= Gate City, Virginia =

Gate City
- Town
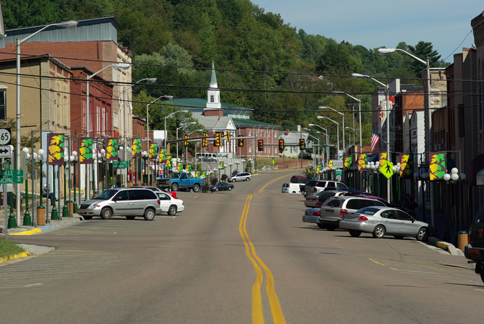
- Gate City in 2007

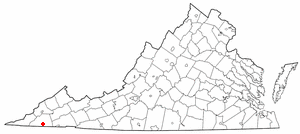
- Location of Gate City, Virginia
- Coordinates: 36°38′18″N 82°34′50″W
- Country: United States
- State: Virginia
- County: Scott

Area
  - Total: 4.02 sq mi (10.41 km^{2})
  - Land: 3.98 sq mi (10.31 km^{2})
  - Water: 0.039 sq mi (0.10 km^{2})
- Elevation: 1,339 ft (408 m)

Population (2020)
  - Total: 2,043
  - Density: 469.5/sq mi (181.28/km^{2})
- Time zone: UTC−5 (Eastern (EST))
  - Summer (DST): UTC−4 (EDT)
- ZIP code: 24251
- Area code: 276
- FIPS code: 51-30496
- GNIS feature ID: 1498481
- Website: Official website

Gate City is a town in Scott County, Virginia, United States. The population was 2,043 at the 2020 census. It is the county seat of Scott County.

Gate City is part of the Kingsport–Bristol–Bristol metropolitan area, which is a component of the "Tri-Cities" region.

Some scenes from The River were shot here.

== History ==
In 1771, Silas Engart received a land grant of 200 acres that included the location of the future town. By the time of Scott County's formation in 1815, landowner James Davidson Sr. donated approximately 13 acres of his plantation for establishing the county seat. The location of the town was such that it would emerge as an important commercial center for people and goods traveling through Big Moccasin Gap and the North Fork of the Holston River.

When the county seat was established in 1815, it was named Winfield in honor of War of 1812 hero Gen. Winfield Scott. The main street of the new town honored war hero and future president Andrew Jackson.

In 1817, the town was renamed Estillville in honor of Benjamin Estill, a local judge instrumental in the formation of the new county. As a result of the county seat's location near Big Moccasin Gap and the North Fork of the Holston River, the town grew into a commercial center for people passing through on their way westward, for farmers hoping to sell goods, and businessmen in town for legal affairs. A regular wagon train and coach line service conveying people, mail, and commercial goods between Bedford and Estilville.

Gate City received its present name in 1886, when Attorney General Rufus A. Ayers pointed out that proximity to Big Moccasin Gap marked the town as the "Gate Way to the West." The town was incorporated in 1892.

By the beginning of the twentieth century, Gate City was one of several "boom towns" located in southwestern Virginia. Although the streets were little more than dirt byways in the town, the area was a vibrant commercial and transportation center. Up to six daily passenger trains passed through Gate City. The town also had a railroad log yard where logs from all over the county were stored and then loaded to be later transported by train. Iron ore from the Snowflake and Nickelsville areas as well as glass sand from the south of Clinch Mountain were manufactured and shipped from Gate City. In addition, the town had a thriving manufacturing center in the area of Water Street where wood pumps, staves, sleds, and harnesses were built. By 1915, the town supported two livery stables on Willow Street and a blacksmith shop on Jackson Street, as well as a dentist's office, an ice plant, a casket shop, and a furniture manufacturing business. By the 1930s, Gate City had three movie theaters, banks, and a hotel. The town also had two businesses that dealt with auto sales and repairs.

By the 1950s and 1960s, the town's momentum was slowing. As industry in Kingsport, Tennessee (six miles to the south) attracted Gate City residents, several local businesses and small manufacturing companies shut down. By 2010, many former commercial buildings stood vacant, but the Gate City Historic District was newly listed on the National Register of Historic Places.

Pilot Flying J, the largest network of service station/travel centers in North America, operating in 44 states and six Canadian provinces, and headquartered in Knoxville, Tennessee, was started in Gate City in 1958.

== Geography ==
Gate City is located at 36°38′18″N 82°34′50″W (36.638325, −82.580659).

According to the United States Census Bureau, the town has a total area of 2.1 square miles (5.4 km^{2}), of which 2.0 square miles (5.2 km^{2}) is land and 0.04 square miles (0.10 km^{2}), or 0.97%, is water. The town has expanded its boundaries since the 2000 census via a boundary adjustment agreement with the county.

Bordered by a mountain, Gate City is a small city relative to its neighbors and located on U.S. Routes 23 and 421 near the Tennessee state line. The Virginia Department of Transportation (VDOT) plans for a large portion of the mountain at Moccasin Gap to be shorn away.

== Demographics ==
Historical population
Census	Pop.	Note	%±
1900	521		—
1910	599		15.0%
1920	684		14.2%
1930	1,216		77.8%
1940	1,565		28.7%
1950	2,126		35.8%
1960	2,142		0.8%
1970	1,914		−10.6%
1980	2,494		30.3%
1990	2,214		−11.2%
2000	2,159		−2.5%
2010	2,034		−5.8%
2020	2,043		0.4%
U.S. Decennial Census

As of the census of 2000, there were 2,159 people, 984 households, and 604 families residing in the town. The population density was 1,058.8 inhabitants per square mile (408.8/km^{2}). There were 1,119 housing units at an average density of 548.8 per square mile (211.9/km^{2}). The racial makeup of the town was 95.69% White, 3.80% African American, 0.09% Native American, and 0.42% from two or more races. Hispanic or Latino of any race were 0.42% of the population.

There were 984 households, out of which 23.7% had children under the age of 18 living with them, 47.9% were married couples living together, 11.0% had a female householder with no husband present, and 38.6% were non-families. 36.2% of all households were made up of individuals, and 19.7% had someone living alone who was 65 years of age or older. The average household size was 2.16 and the average family size was 2.81.

In the town, 20.0% of the population was under the age of 18, 7.3% was from 18 to 24, 25.7% from 25 to 44, 24.8% from 45 to 64, and 22.2% was 65 years of age or older. The median age was 43 years. For every 100 females, there were 87.7 males. For every 100 females age 18 and over, there were 81.0 males.

The median income for a household in the town was $31,875, and the median income for a family was $48,068. Males had a median income of $35,875 versus $22,292 for females. The per capita income for the town was $19,268. About 4.1% of families and 13.5% of the population were below the poverty line, including 15.9% of those under age 18 and 22.9% of those age 65 or over.

== Education ==
=== Primary and Secondary ===
==== List of Gate City schools ====
Shoemaker Elementary School

Yuma Elementary School

Gate City Middle School

Gate City High School

== Notable people ==
- Fayette McMullen, second appointed Governor of Washington Territory
- James Stewart Martin, U.S. representative from Illinois
- Rufus A. Ayers, lawyer who served as Attorney General of Virginia
- Charles S. Pendleton, politician
- Ford C. Quillen, attorney and politician
- Mac McClung, basketball player for the Orlando Magic

== Gallery ==
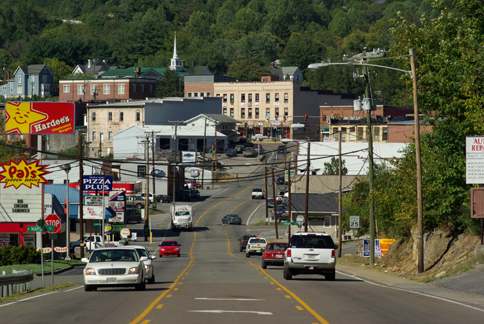

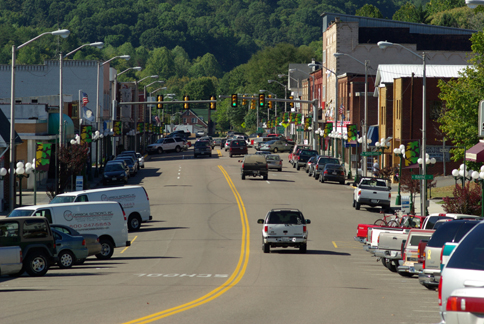
