= Gate City High School =

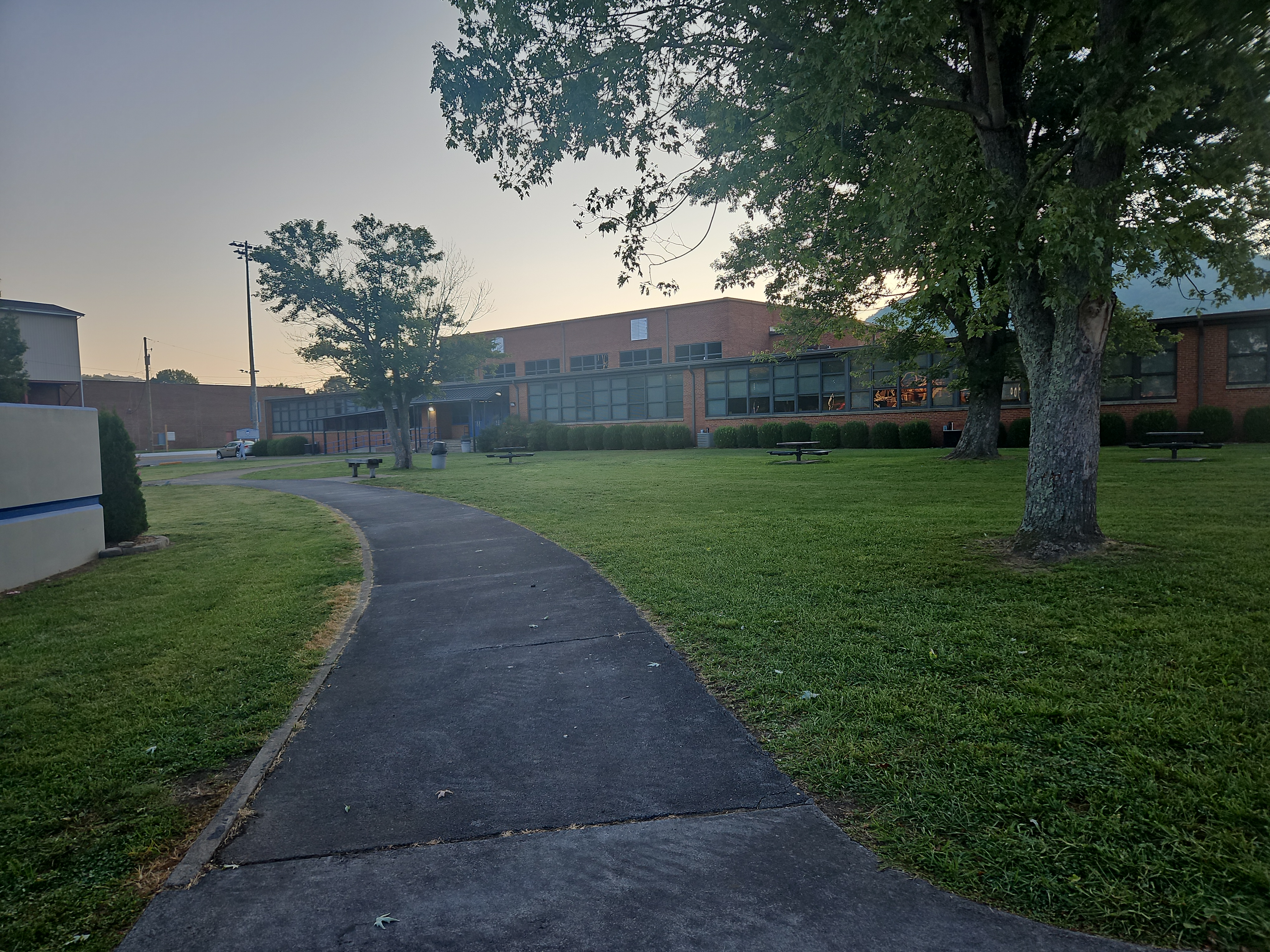

Location
- 178 Harry Fry Drive; Gate City, Scott, Virginia 24251; United States; 36°38′24.2″N 82°34′10.9″W

Information
- School type: Public, high school
- Established: 1956
- School district: Scott County Schools
- Superintendent: John Ferguson
- Principal: Scott Vermillion
- Grades: 9–12
- Hours in school day: 7 (8:25-3:10)
- Campus size: 24 acres (97,000 m^{2})
- Colors: Blue and White
- Fight song: Notre Dame Victory March
- Athletics: Soccer, football, golf, volleyball, cross-country, basketball, baseball, softball, tennis, track, swimming, soccer
- Athletics conference: Mountain 7 District; Region D
- Mascot: Blue Devils
- Newspaper: Virginia Star
- Website: http://gchs.scottschools.com

Gate City High School is a public high school in Gate City, Virginia. The school was built in 1956. The school employs about 41 teachers and the student-to-teacher ratio is 15.10. Gate City High School's mascot is the Blue devil, and the school colors are blue, black, and white.

== Extracurricular activities ==
Gate City High School offers a variety of sports and recreational programs, competing in soccer, track and field, swimming, cross-country, forensics, speech and drama, and academic tournaments. The girls' basketball team won the state championship in 2006 and 2020 and were state runners-up in 2005, 2012, 2014, and 2021. The boys' team won the state championship for the 2017-2018 season and were state runners-up for the 1998-1999, 2006-2007, 2007–2008, 2012–13, and 2019-20 seasons, also winning the Marshall Johnson Sportsmanship Award for the 2004-2005 season.

Gate City won state championships in football in 1970, 1974, 1997, 2003, and 2010. and were runners-up in 1978, 1994, and 2007. The school currently has three VHSL Hall of Fame inductees: Coach Harry Fry in 1991, Coach Nick Colobro in 2005, and football player Jeff Baker in 1995. The school also holds the 2002 and 2005 state championships in softball. The girls' tennis team won the 2003, 2004, 2005, 2006, 2007, 2010, 2012, 2014 and 2016 state championships, ⁣ and the boys' tennis team won the 2008 and 2009 state championships. Gate City additionally won the 2004, 2005, 2008, 2009, 2013 and 2014 state championships in volleyball.

Gate City alum Mac McClung holds the Virginia state high school scoring record, formerly held by Allen Iverson. He also broke J.J. Redick's state championship game scoring record (McClung had 47 to Reddick’s 43).

== Pre-game prayer controversy ==
In 2009 the American Civil Liberties Union sent a letter to the school objecting to a Christian prayer having been read over the public address system before a football game. The principal, Greg Ervin, said that a student had read the prayer on her own initiative in response to the death of a student. Students then planned to protest the ACLU's position by wearing T-shirts reading "We're still praying in Jesus' Name" to a subsequent game, and the ACLU endorsed their right to do so.
