= 2018–19 St. John's Red Storm men's basketball team =

American college basketball season

2018–19 St. John's Red Storm men's basketball

Legends Classic champions

NCAA tournament, First Four
- Conference: Big East Conference
- Record: 21–13 (8–10 Big East)
- Head coach: Chris Mullin (4th season)
- Assistant coaches: Mitch Richmond; Matt Abdelmassih; Greg St. Jean
- Home arena: Carnesecca Arena; Madison Square Garden

2018–19 Big East men's basketball standings
	Conf.				Overall
Team	W		L	PCT	W		L	PCT
No. 23 Villanova †	13	–	5	.722	26	–	10	.722
Marquette	12	–	6	.667	24	–	10	.706
Seton Hall	9	–	9	.500	20	–	14	.588
Xavier	9	–	9	.500	19	–	16	.543
Creighton	9	–	9	.500	20	–	15	.571
Georgetown	9	–	9	.500	19	–	14	.576
St. John's	8	–	10	.444	21	–	13	.618
Providence	7	–	11	.389	18	–	16	.529
Butler	7	–	11	.389	16	–	17	.485
DePaul	7	–	11	.389	19	–	17	.528
† 2019 Big East tournament winner Rankings from AP Poll

The 2018–19 St. John's Red Storm men's basketball team represented St. John's University during the 2018–19 NCAA Division I men's basketball season. They were coached by alumnus and Naismith Memorial Basketball Hall of Fame member Chris Mullin, in his fourth year at the school. They played their home games at Carnesecca Arena and Madison Square Garden as members of the Big East Conference. They finished the season 21–13, 8–10 in Big East Play to finish in seventh place. They defeated DePaul in the first round of the Big East tournament before losing Marquette in the quarter-finals. They received an at-large bid to the NCAA tournament as an 11th seed. However, they lost to fellow 11th seed Arizona State at the First Four.

On April 9, 2019, head coach Chris Mullin resigned after four seasons. On April 19, the school announced it had hired former Arkansas head coach Mike Anderson as the team's new coach.

== Previous season ==
The Red Storm finished the 2017–18 season with a record of 16–17, 4–14 in Big East play to finish in ninth place in the conference. They defeated Georgetown in the first round of the Big East tournament before losing to Xavier in the quarterfinals.

== Offseason ==
=== Departures ===
Name	Number	Pos.	Height	Weight	Year	Hometown	Notes
Bashir Ahmed	1	G/F	6'7"	210	Senior	Bronx, New York	Graduated
Mikey Dixon	3	G	6'2"	170	RS Sophomore	New Castle, DE	Transferred to Grand Canyon (mid-season)
Amar Alibegović	10	F	6'9"	240	Senior	Rome, Italy	Graduated
Tariq Owens	11	F	6'11"	205	RS Junior	Odenton, MD	Graduated; Transferred to Texas Tech.
Kassoum Yakwe	14	F	6'7"	210	Junior	Bamako, Mali	Graduated; Transferred to Connecticut.
Marcus LoVett Jr.	20	G	6'0"	180	RS Sophomore	Fort Wayne, IN	Entered KLS
Boubacar Diakite	22	F	6'8"	185	Freshman	Bamako, Mali	Transferred to Iona

=== Incoming transfers ===
Name	Number	Pos.	Height	Weight	Year	Hometown	Previous school
David Caraher	11	F	6'6"	220	Sophomore	Chapel Hill, North Carolina	Houston Baptist
Mustapha Heron	14	G	6'5"	218	Junior	Waterbury, Connecticut	Auburn
Eli Wright	40	G	6'4"	203	Junior	Owensboro, Kentucky	Mississippi State
L. J. Figueroa	30	G/F	6'6"	185	Sophomore	Lawrence, Massachusetts	Odessa College
Ian Steere	33	F	6'9"	260	Freshman	Sanford, North Carolina	NC State (mid-season)

=== 2018 recruiting class ===
College recruiting
Name	Hometown	School	Height	Weight	Commit date
Greg Williams Jr. SG	Lafayette, LA	Lafayette Christian Academy	6 ft 3 in (1.91 m)	190 lb (86 kg)	Nov 15, 2017
Greg Williams Jr. SG	Recruit ratings: Scout: Rivals: 247Sports: (82)				
Josh Roberts; SF	Troy, AL	Montverde Academy	6 ft 9 in (2.06 m)	210 lb (95 kg)	Sep 8, 2017
Josh Roberts; SF	Recruit ratings: Scout: Rivals: 247Sports: (77)				
Marcellus Earlington; PF	Ramsey, NJ	Don Bosco Prep	6 ft 5 in (1.96 m)	240 lb (110 kg)	Feb 28, 2018
Marcellus Earlington; PF	Recruit ratings: Scout: Rivals: 247Sports: (N/A)				
Overall recruit ranking:
Note: In many cases, Scout, Rivals, 247Sports, On3, and ESPN may conflict in their listings of height and weight.; In these cases, the average was taken. ESPN grades are on a 100-point scale.; Sources: "2018 Team Ranking". Rivals.

=== 2019 recruiting class ===
College recruiting (2018)
Name	Hometown	School	Height	Weight	Commit date
Johnathan McGriff; PG	District Heights, MD	Bishop McNamara	5 ft 9 in (1.75 m)	160 lb (73 kg)	May 2, 2019
Johnathan McGriff; PG	Recruit ratings: Scout: Rivals: 247Sports: (70)				
Overall recruit ranking:
Note: In many cases, Scout, Rivals, 247Sports, On3, and ESPN may conflict in their listings of height and weight.; In these cases, the average was taken. ESPN grades are on a 100-point scale.; Sources: "2019 Team Ranking". Rivals.

== Roster ==
2018–19 St. John's Red Storm men's basketball team
Players
Coaches

Pos.	#	Name	Height	Weight	Year	Previous school	Hometown
F	0	Sedee Keita	6 ft 9 in (2.06 m)	235 lb (107 kg)	RS So	South Carolina	Philadelphia, PA
F	1	Josh Roberts	6 ft 9 in (2.06 m)	210 lb (95 kg)	Fr	Montverde Academy	Troy, AL
G	2	Shamorie Ponds	6 ft 1 in (1.85 m)	180 lb (82 kg)	Jr	Thomas Jefferson	Brooklyn, NY
G	4	Greg Williams Jr.	6 ft 3 in (1.91 m)	205 lb (93 kg)	Fr	Lafayette Christian	Lafayette, LA
G	5	Justin Simon	6 ft 5 in (1.96 m)	205 lb (93 kg)	RS Jr	Arizona	Temecula, CA
F	10	Marcellus Earlington	6 ft 6 in (1.98 m)	220 lb (100 kg)	Fr	Don Bosco Prep	Ramsey, NJ
F	11	David Caraher (redshirt)	6 ft 6 in (1.98 m)	220 lb (100 kg)	So	Houston Baptist	Chapel Hill, NC
G	12	Bryan Trimble Jr.	6 ft 3 in (1.91 m)	220 lb (100 kg)	So	Sunrise Christian	Kansas City, MO
F	13	Marvin Clark II	6 ft 7 in (2.01 m)	225 lb (102 kg)	RS Sr	Michigan State	Kansas City, MO
G	14	Mustapha Heron	6 ft 5 in (1.96 m)	210 lb (95 kg)	Jr	Auburn	Waterbury, CT
G	23	Justin Cole (W)	6 ft 2 in (1.88 m)	185 lb (84 kg)	Jr	Archbishop Molloy	Rockville Centre, NY
G	24	Brandon Lawrence (W)	6 ft 2 in (1.88 m)	170 lb (77 kg)	Jr	Moreau Catholic	Union City, CA
G/F	30	L. J. Figueroa	6 ft 6 in (1.98 m)	195 lb (88 kg)	So	Odessa College	Lawrence, MA
G	32	Jay Camus (W)	5 ft 10 in (1.78 m)	170 lb (77 kg)	Sr	Manhattan	Queens, NY
F	33	Ian Steere (redshirt)	6 ft 9 in (2.06 m)	260 lb (118 kg)	Fr	NC State	Sanford, NC
G	40	Eli Wright (redshirt)	6 ft 5 in (1.96 m)	190 lb (86 kg)	Jr	Mississippi State	Owensboro, KY

Head coach

- Chris Mullin (St. John's)

Assistant coach(es)

- Mitch Richmond (Kansas State)
- Matt Abdelmassih (St. John's)
- Greg St. Jean (Wesleyan)

Legend

- (C) Team captain
- (S) Suspended
- (I) Ineligible
- (W) Walk-on
- Injured
- Current redshirt

Roster

== Schedule and results ==
Date time, TV	Rank^{#}	Opponent^{#}	Result	Record	High points	High rebounds	High assists	Site (attendance) city, state
Exhibition
November 1, 2018*; 6:30 pm, ESPN3		Maryville	W 71–57		15 – Figueroa	12 – Ponds	6 – Tied	Carnesecca Arena (4,262); Queens, NY
Regular season
November 6, 2018*; 6:30 pm, FSN		Loyola (MD); Legends Classic campus-site game	W 76–55	1–0	20 – Ponds	8 – Figueroa	4 – Ponds	Carnesecca Arena (4,863); Queens, NY
November 9, 2018*; 6:30 pm, FS2		Bowling Green; Legends Classic campus-site game	W 84–80	2–0	26 – Heron	6 – Heron	6 – Simon	Carnesecca Arena (5,174); Queens, NY
November 16, 2018*; 7:00 pm, BTN		at Rutgers; Gavitt Tipoff Games	W 84–65	3–0	27 – Heron	11 – Figueroa	6 – Ponds	Louis Brown Athletic Center (7,102); Piscataway, NJ
November 19, 2018*; 7:00 pm, ESPN2		vs. California; Legends Classic semifinals	W 82–79	4–0	32 – Ponds	8 – Clark II	5 – Ponds	Barclays Center (5,967); Brooklyn, NY
November 20, 2018*; 7:30 pm, ESPN2		vs. VCU; Legends Classic championship	W 87–86 ^{OT}	5–0	35 – Ponds	9 – Figueroa	7 – Ponds	Barclays Center (5,453); Brooklyn, NY
November 27, 2018*; 6:30 pm, FS1		Maryland Eastern Shore	W 85–64	6–0	25 – Figueroa	13 – Figueroa	6 – Ponds	Carnesecca Arena (4,727); Queens, NY
December 1, 2018*; 12:00 pm, ESPNU		vs. Georgia Tech; Hoophall Miami Invitational	W 76–73	7–0	37 – Ponds	7 – Simon	3 – Heron	American Airlines Arena (5,749); Miami, FL
December 5, 2018*; 6:30 pm, FS2		Mount St. Mary's	W 85–71	8–0	21 – Clark II	11 – Figueroa	7 – Tied	Carnesecca Arena (4,928); Queens, NY
December 9, 2018*; 1:00 pm, FS1		Princeton; Madison Square Garden Holiday Festival	W 89–74	9–0	26 – Ponds	8 – Tied	5 – Ponds	Madison Square Garden (10,078); New York, NY
December 16, 2018*; 4:30 pm, FS1		Wagner	W 73–58	10–0	19 – Figueroa	9 – Ponds	14 – Ponds	Carnesecca Arena (5,602); Queens, NY
December 19, 2018*; 6:30 pm, FS1		St. Francis Brooklyn	W 86–52	11–0	13 – Tied	9 – Figueroa	5 – Ponds	Carnesecca Arena (5,151); Queens, NY
December 22, 2018*; 8:00 pm, FS1		Sacred Heart	W 104–82	12–0	23 – Tied	6 – Clark II	9 – Ponds	Carnesecca Arena (5,602); Queens, NY
Big East regular season
December 29, 2018; 8:30 pm, FSN		at Seton Hall	L 74–76	12–1 (0–1)	19 – Heron	7 – Figueroa	7 – Ponds	Prudential Center (10,481); Newark, NJ
January 1, 2019; 7:00 pm, FS1		No. 16 Marquette	W 89–69	13–1 (1–1)	26 – Ponds	8 – Heron	5 – Ponds	Carnesecca Arena (5,602); Queens, NY
January 5, 2019; 1:08 pm, CBS		at Georgetown; Rivalry	W 97–94 ^{OT}	14–1 (2–1)	37 – Ponds	9 – Tied	6 – Tied	Capital One Arena (11,115); Washington, D.C.
January 8, 2019; 7:00 pm, FS1	No. 24	at Villanova	L 71–76	14–2 (2–2)	23 – Ponds	7 – Figueroa	9 – Simon	Finneran Pavilion (6,501); Villanova, PA
January 12, 2019; 6:00 pm, CBSSN	No. 24	DePaul	L 71–79	14–3 (2–3)	23 – Figueroa	12 – Clark II	7 – Simon	Carnesecca Arena (5,602); Queens, NY
January 16, 2019; 6:30 pm, FS1		Creighton	W 81–66	15–3 (3–3)	22 – Ponds	13 – Figueroa	5 – Ponds	Carnesecca Arena (5,602); Queens, NY
January 19, 2019; 4:30 pm, FOX		at Butler	L 71–80	15–4 (3–4)	20 – Tied	8 – Tied	5 – Simon	Hinkle Fieldhouse (9,121); Indianapolis, IN
January 27, 2019; 12:00 pm, FOX		Georgetown; Rivalry	L 78–89	15–5 (3–5)	21 – Ponds	7 – Simon	3 – Tie	Madison Square Garden (17,801); New York, NY
January 30, 2019; 8:30 pm, FS1		at Creighton	W 83–67	16–5 (4–5)	26 – Ponds	8 – Ponds	8 – Ponds	CHI Health Center (16,832); Omaha, NE
February 2, 2019*; 12:00 pm, ESPN		at No. 2 Duke	L 61–91	16–6	14 – Figueroa	8 – Figueroa	4 – Ponds	Cameron Indoor Stadium (9,314); Durham, NC
February 5, 2019; 8:00 pm, FS1		at No. 10 Marquette	W 70–69	17–6 (5–5)	28 – Ponds	7 – Ponds	3 – Simon	Fiserv Forum (14,030); Milwaukee, WI
February 9, 2019; 12:00 pm, CBSSN		Providence	L 56–70	17–7 (5–6)	20 – Ponds	8 – Clark II	4 – Simon	Madison Square Garden (16,268); New York, NY
February 12, 2019; 8:30 pm, CBSSN		Butler	W 77–73 ^{OT}	18–7 (6–6)	28 – Heron	7 – Tied	4 – Figueroa	Carnesecca Arena (5,602); Queens, NY
February 17, 2019; 5:00 pm, FS1		No. 13 Villanova	W 71–65	19–7 (7–6)	22 – Figueroa	12 – Figueroa	4 – Simon	Madison Square Garden (19,812); New York, NY
February 20, 2019; 8:30 pm, FS1		at Providence	L 59–78	19–8 (7–7)	16 – Figueroa	5 – Tied	5 – Ponds	Dunkin' Donuts Center (9,872); Providence, RI
February 23, 2019; 8:00 pm, FS1		Seton Hall	W 78–70	20–8 (8–7)	27 – Ponds	6 – Clark II	5 – Ponds	Madison Square Garden (18,529); New York, NY
February 28, 2019; 6:30 pm, FS1		Xavier	L 73–84	20–9 (8–8)	23 – Figueroa	7 – Simon	6 – Ponds	Carnesecca Arena (5,602); Queens, NY
March 3, 2019; 12:00 pm, FS1		at DePaul	L 83–92	20–10 (8–9)	29 – Ponds	5 – Figueroa	2 – Tied	Wintrust Arena (5,736); Chicago, IL
March 9, 2019; 5:00 pm, FOX		at Xavier	L 68–81	20–11 (8–10)	20 – Figueroa	8 – Clark II	10 – Ponds	Cintas Center (10,391); Cincinnati, OH
Big East tournament
March 13, 2019; 9:30 pm, FS1	(7)	vs. (10) DePaul; First Round	W 82–74	21–11	18 – Tied	7 – Heron	7 – Ponds	Madison Square Garden (19,812); New York, NY
March 14, 2019; 7:00 pm, FS1	(7)	vs. (2) No. 23 Marquette; Quarterfinals	L 54–86	21–12	14 – Simon	8 – Simon	2 – Tied	Madison Square Garden (19,812); New York, NY
NCAA tournament
March 20, 2019*; 9:10 pm, truTV	(11 W)	vs. (11 W) Arizona State; First Four	L 65–74	21–13	25 – Ponds	10 – Figueroa	4 – Ponds	UD Arena (11,827); Dayton, OH
*Non-conference game. ^{#}Rankings from AP Poll. (#) Tournament seedings in parentheses. W=West Region. All times are in Eastern Time.
