= 2019 National Invitation Tournament =

Single-elimination college basketball tournament

- Season: 2018–19
- Teams: 32
- Finals site: Madison Square Garden, New York City
- Champions: Texas Longhorns (2nd title)
- Runner-up: Lipscomb Bisons (1st title game)
- Semifinalists: Wichita State Shockers (2nd semifinal); TCU Horned Frogs (2nd semifinal)
- Winning coach: Shaka Smart (1st title)
- MVP: Dylan Osetkowski (Texas)

The 2019 National Invitation Tournament (NIT) was a single-elimination tournament of 32 NCAA Division I men's college basketball teams that were not selected to participate in the 2019 NCAA tournament. The tournament started on March 19, and concluded on April 4. The first three rounds were played on campus sites with the higher seeded team acting as host. The semifinals and championship game were held at Madison Square Garden in New York City.

== Experimental rules ==
On February 22, 2019, the NCAA announced a set of experimental rules that were used in this edition of the NIT.

The following rules were also used in the 2018 NIT:

- The three-point line was moved to the FIBA standard of 6.75 metres (22 ft 2 in). When the arc approaches the sideline, it changed to a line parallel to and 1.02 metres (3 ft 4 in) from the sideline. (Note: FIBA's definition of the three-point arc calls for the line to be exactly 0.9 metres (2 ft 11 in) from the sideline until it intersects the 6.75 m arc. However, the FIBA court is officially defined as 15 m (49 ft 3 in) wide, slightly narrower than the NCAA standard of 50 ft (15.24 m). On a FIBA court, the closest three-point distance, found along a line parallel to the baseline that passes through the center of the basket, is thus 6.6 m (21 ft 8 in) from the center of the basket. Translating this distance to the NCAA court dimensions results in the line being the stated 1.02 m from the sidelines.)
- The free-throw lane was widened from the current college standard of 12 feet to the NBA standard of 16 feet.
- After an offensive rebound, the shot clock was reset to 20 seconds instead of the current NCAA standard of 30.

A set of rules relating to free throws that had been used in the 2017 NIT were used again in the 2019 edition, with one modification:

- Team foul counts, for purposes of determining bonus free throws, were reset to zero at the 10-minute mark of each half, effectively dividing the game into quarters for that purpose. This mirrored the current practice in NCAA women's basketball, which has been played in quarters since the 2015–16 season.
- The "one-and-one" was eliminated. All bonus free throw situations resulted in two free throws for the non-fouled team.
- Teams entered the bonus upon the fifth team foul in each 10-minute segment.
- The team foul count was reset to zero at the start of any overtime period. Teams entered the bonus upon the fourth team foul in an overtime period.
- In a completely new feature, the NCAA adopted the NBA's bonus rule regarding team fouls in the last 2 minutes of any period. Teams entered the bonus on the second team foul in the last 2 minutes of a 10-minute segment or overtime period, regardless of the total team foul count at that point of the period.

== Participants ==
=== Automatic qualifiers ===
The following teams were guaranteed berths into the 2019 NIT field by having the best regular season record in their conference but failing to win their conference tournament. Such teams were eligible to receive an at-large berth into the NCAA tournament but did not.

Team	Conference	Overall record	Appearance	Last bid
Campbell	Big South	20–12	1st	Never
Harvard	Ivy League	18–11	3rd	2018
Hofstra	Colonial	27–7	6th	2016
Lipscomb	ASUN	25–7	2nd	2006
Loyola–Chicago	Missouri Valley	20–13	5th	1980
Norfolk State	MEAC	21–13	2nd	2013
Saint Francis (PA)	Northeast	18–14	4th	1958
Sam Houston State	Southland	21–11	1st	Never
South Dakota State	Summit	24–8	2nd	2015
Wright State	Horizon	21–13	1st	Never

=== At-large bids ===
The following teams were also awarded NIT berths.

Team	Conference	Overall record	Appearance	Last bid
Alabama	SEC	18–15	16th	2017
Arkansas	SEC	17–15	4th	2014
Butler	Big East	16–16	9th	2006
Clemson	ACC	19–13	17th	2017
Colorado	Pac-12	21–12	11th	2017
Creighton	Big East	18–14	12th	2016
Davidson	Atlantic 10	24–9	8th	2016
Dayton	Atlantic 10	21–11	25th	2012
Furman	Southern	25–7	2nd	1991
Georgetown	Big East	19–13	13th	2014
Indiana	Big Ten	17–15	6th	2017
Memphis	American	21–13	18th	2010
NC State	ACC	22–11	12th	2007
Nebraska	Big Ten	18–16	19th	2018
Providence	Big East	18–15	20th	2013
San Diego	WCC	21–14	1st	Never
TCU	Big 12	20–13	8th	2017
Texas	Big 12	16–16	5th	1986
Toledo	MAC	25–7	9th	2014
UNC Greensboro	Southern	28–6	3rd	2017
Wichita State	American	19–14	13th	2011
Xavier	Big East	18–15	8th	2000

== Seeds ==
UNC Greensboro bracket
Seed	School	Conference	Record	Berth type
1	UNC Greensboro	Southern	28–6	At-large
2	NC State	ACC	22–11	At-large
3	Georgetown	Big East	19–13	At-large
4	Davidson	Atlantic 10	24–9	At-large
5	Lipscomb	ASUN	25–7	Automatic
6	Harvard	Ivy League	18–11	Automatic
7	Hofstra	Colonial	27–7	Automatic
8	Campbell	Big South	20–12	Automatic

Alabama bracket
Seed	School	Conference	Record	Berth type
1	Alabama	SEC	18–15	At-large
2	Texas	Big 12	16–16	At-large
3	Xavier	Big East	18–15	At-large
4	Colorado	Pac-12	21–12	At-large
5	Dayton	Atlantic 10	21–11	At-large
6	Toledo	MAC	25–7	At-large
7	South Dakota State	Summit	24–8	Automatic
8	Norfolk State	MEAC	21–13	Automatic

TCU bracket
Seed	School	Conference	Record	Berth type
1	TCU	Big 12	20–13	At-large
2	Creighton	Big East	18–14	At-large
3	Memphis	American	21–13	At-large
4	Nebraska	Big Ten	18–16	At-large
5	Butler	Big East	16–16	At-large
6	San Diego	WCC	21–14	At-large
7	Loyola–Chicago	Missouri Valley	20–13	Automatic
8	Sam Houston State	Southland	21–11	Automatic

Indiana bracket
Seed	School	Conference	Record	Berth type
1	Indiana	Big Ten	17–15	At-large
2	Clemson	ACC	19–13	At-large
3	Furman	Southern	25–7	At-large
4	Providence	Big East	18–15	At-large
5	Arkansas	SEC	17–15	At-large
6	Wichita State	American	19–14	At-large
7	Wright State	Horizon	21–13	Automatic
8	Saint Francis (PA)	Northeast	18–14	Automatic

== Bracket ==
First round March 19–20; Campus sites
1	UNC Greensboro	84
8	Campbell	69
4	Davidson	81
5	Lipscomb	89
3	Georgetown	68
6	Harvard	71
2	NC State	84
7	Hofstra	78

Second round March 23–24; Campus sites
1	UNC Greensboro	69
5	Lipscomb	86
6	Harvard	77
2	NC State	78

Quarterfinal; March 27; Reynolds Coliseum
5	Lipscomb	94
2	NC State	93

First round March 19–20; Campus sites
1	Alabama	79
8	Norfolk State	80*
4	Colorado	78
5	Dayton	73
3	Xavier	78
6	Toledo	64
2	Texas	79
7	South Dakota State	73

Second round March 24–25; Campus sites
8	Norfolk State	60
4	Colorado	76
3	Xavier	76
2	Texas	78*

Quarterfinal; March 27; Frank Erwin Center
4	Colorado	55
2	Texas	68

First round March 19–20; Campus sites
1	TCU	82
8	Sam Houston State	69
4	Nebraska	80
5	Butler	76
3	Memphis	74
6	San Diego	60
2	Creighton	70
7	Loyola–Chicago	61

Second round March 22–24; Campus sites
1	TCU	88
4	Nebraska	72
3	Memphis	67
2	Creighton	79

Quarterfinal; March 26; Schollmaier Arena
1	TCU	71
2	Creighton	58

First round March 19–20; Campus sites
1	Indiana	89
8	Saint Francis (PA)	72
4	Providence	72
5	Arkansas	84
3	Furman	70
6	Wichita State	76
2	Clemson	75
7	Wright State	69

Second round March 23–24; Campus sites
1	Indiana	63
5	Arkansas	60
6	Wichita State	63
2	Clemson	55

Quarterfinal; March 26; Simon Skjodt Assembly Hall
1	Indiana	63
6	Wichita State	73

Semifinals; April 2 Madison Square Garden
6	Wichita State	64
5	Lipscomb	71
1	TCU	44
2	Texas	58

Final; April 4 Madison Square Garden
5	Lipscomb	66
2	Texas	81

* Denotes overtime period

== Media ==
ESPN, Inc. had exclusive television rights to all of the NIT Games. It telecast every game across ESPN, ESPN2, ESPNU, and ESPN3. Westwood One had exclusive radio rights to the semifinals and the championship.

== See also ==
- 2019 Women's National Invitation Tournament
