= 2018–19 Providence Friars men's basketball team =

American college basketball season

2018–19 Providence Friars men's basketball
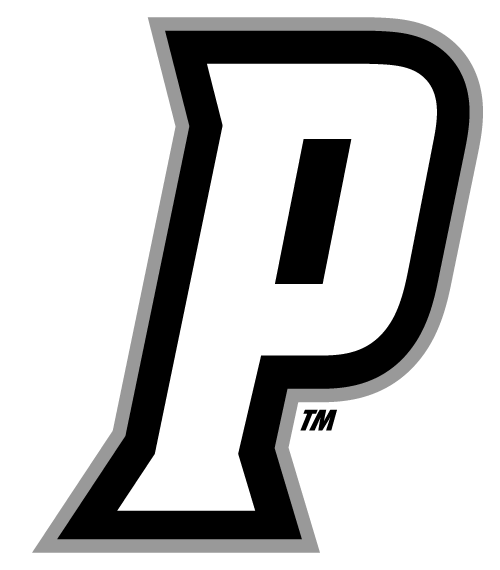

NIT, first round
- Conference: Big East Conference
- Record: 18–16 (7–11 Big East)
- Head coach: Ed Cooley (8th season)
- Assistant coaches: Jeff Battle; Brian Blaney; Ivan Thomas
- Home arena: Dunkin' Donuts Center

2018–19 Big East men's basketball standings
	Conf.				Overall
Team	W		L	PCT	W		L	PCT
No. 23 Villanova †	13	–	5	.722	26	–	10	.722
Marquette	12	–	6	.667	24	–	10	.706
Seton Hall	9	–	9	.500	20	–	14	.588
Xavier	9	–	9	.500	19	–	16	.543
Creighton	9	–	9	.500	20	–	15	.571
Georgetown	9	–	9	.500	19	–	14	.576
St. John's	8	–	10	.444	21	–	13	.618
Providence	7	–	11	.389	18	–	16	.529
Butler	7	–	11	.389	16	–	17	.485
DePaul	7	–	11	.389	19	–	17	.528
† 2019 Big East tournament winner Rankings from AP Poll

The 2018–19 Providence Friars men's basketball team represented Providence College in the 2018–19 NCAA Division I men's basketball season. The Friars, led by eighth-year head coach Ed Cooley, played their home games at the Dunkin' Donuts Center as members of the Big East Conference. They finished the season 18–16, 7–11 in Big East play to finish in a three-way tie for last place. As the No. 8 seed in the Big East tournament, they defeated Butler before losing to Villanova in the quarterfinals. They received an at-large bid to the NIT where they lost in the first round to Arkansas.

== Previous season ==
The Friars finished the 2017–18 season 21–14, 10–8 in Big East play to finish in a three-way tie for third place. As the No. 5 seed in the Big East tournament, they defeated Creighton and No. 1-seeded Xavier in back-to-back overtime games to advance to the championship game. In a third straight overtime game, the Friars fell to Villanova in the championship game. They received an at-large bid to the NCAA tournament as the No. 10 seed in the West region where they lost to Texas A&M in the first round.

== Offseason ==
=== Departures ===
Name	Number	Pos.	Height	Weight	Year	Hometown	Reason for departure
Rodney Bullock	5	F	6'8"	225	RS Senior	Hampton, VA	Graduated
Jalen Lindsay	21	F	6'7"	227	Senior	Murfreesboro, TN	Graduated
Kyron Cartwright	24	G	5'11"	185	Senior	Compton, CA	Graduated
Dajour Dickens	33	C	7'0"	220	Freshman	Hampton, VA	Transferred to Old Dominion
Tom Planek	34	F	6'7"	210	Senior	Oak Park, IL	Graduated

=== 2018 recruiting class ===
College recruiting
Name	Hometown	School	Height	Weight	Commit date
David Duke #15 PG	Providence, RI	Cushing Academy	6 ft 3 in (1.91 m)	175 lb (79 kg)	Oct 14, 2017
David Duke #15 PG	Recruit ratings: Scout: Rivals: (87)				
A. J. Reeves #6 SG	Chestnut Hill, MA	Brimmer and May School	6 ft 5 in (1.96 m)	180 lb (82 kg)	Jun 25, 2017
A. J. Reeves #6 SG	Recruit ratings: Scout: Rivals: (87)				
Kris Monroe #43 PF	Raleigh, NC	St. David's School	6 ft 7 in (2.01 m)	220 lb (100 kg)	Aug 3, 2017
Kris Monroe #43 PF	Recruit ratings: Scout: Rivals: (77)				
Jimmy Nichols; PF	Conway, SC	Conway High School	6 ft 8 in (2.03 m)	205 lb (93 kg)	Sep 5, 2017
Jimmy Nichols; PF	Recruit ratings: Scout: Rivals: (NR)				
Overall recruit ranking:
Note: In many cases, Scout, Rivals, 247Sports, On3, and ESPN may conflict in their listings of height and weight.; In these cases, the average was taken. ESPN grades are on a 100-point scale.; Sources: "2018 Team Ranking". Rivals.

=== 2019 recruiting class ===
College recruiting (2019)
Name	Hometown	School	Height	Weight	Commit date
Greg Gantt #11 SF	Fayetteville, NC	Cushing Academy	6 ft 7 in (2.01 m)	185 lb (84 kg)	Oct 14, 2017
Greg Gantt #11 SF	Recruit ratings: Scout: Rivals: (85)				
Overall recruit ranking:
Note: In many cases, Scout, Rivals, 247Sports, On3, and ESPN may conflict in their listings of height and weight.; In these cases, the average was taken. ESPN grades are on a 100-point scale.; Sources: "2019 Team Ranking". Rivals.

== Roster ==
2018–19 Providence Friars men's basketball team
Players
Coaches

Pos.	#	Name	Height	Weight	Year	Previous school	Hometown
C	0	Nate Watson	6 ft 10 in (2.08 m)	260 lb (118 kg)	So	Bishop O'Connell High School	Arlington, Virginia
G	1	Makai Ashton-Langford	6 ft 3 in (1.91 m)	185 lb (84 kg)	So	Brewster Academy	Worcester, Massachusetts
F	2	Kris Monroe	6 ft 8 in (2.03 m)	220 lb (100 kg)	Fr	St. David's School	Creedmoor, North Carolina
G	3	David Duke	6 ft 5 in (1.96 m)	190 lb (86 kg)	Fr	Cushing Academy	Providence, Rhode Island
G	4	Maliek White	6 ft 3 in (1.91 m)	190 lb (86 kg)	Jr	George Wythe High School	Richmond, Virginia
F	5	Jimmy Nichols	6 ft 8 in (2.03 m)	220 lb (100 kg)	Fr	Conway High School	Conway, South Carolina
G	10	A. J. Reeves	6 ft 6 in (1.98 m)	210 lb (95 kg)	Fr	Brimmer and May School	Roxbury, Massachusetts
G	11	Alpha Diallo	6 ft 7 in (2.01 m)	211 lb (96 kg)	Jr	Brewster Academy	New York, New York
F	13	Kalif Young	6 ft 9 in (2.06 m)	255 lb (116 kg)	Jr	Orangeville Prep	Vaughan, Ontario
F	15	Emmitt Holt	6 ft 7 in (2.01 m)	240 lb (109 kg)	RS Sr	Webster Schroeder; Indian Hills CC	Webster, New York
G	24	Andrew Fonts (W)	6 ft 2 in (1.88 m)	170 lb (77 kg)	So	Portsmouth Abbey School	Portsmouth, Rhode Island
F	25	Drew Edwards	6 ft 4 in (1.93 m)	190 lb (86 kg)	RS Jr	Calvert Hall	Perry Hall, Maryland
G	44	Isaiah Jackson	6 ft 6 in (1.98 m)	225 lb (102 kg)	RS Sr	Villages Charter School; George Mason	Gainesville, Florida

Head coach

- Ed Cooley (Stonehill)

Assistant coach(es)

- Jeff Battle (Marshall)
- Brian Blaney (Roanoke)
- Ivan Thomas (VCU)

Legend

- (C) Team captain
- (S) Suspended
- (I) Ineligible
- (W) Walk-on
- Injured
- Current redshirt

Roster

== Schedule and results ==
Date time, TV	Rank^{#}	Opponent^{#}	Result	Record	High points	High rebounds	High assists	Site (attendance) city, state
Exhibition
October 19, 2018*; 7:00 pm		Bridgeport	W 96–57		15 – Watson	9 – Diallo	4 – Tied	Dunkin' Donuts Center (3,045); Providence, RI
October 27, 2018*; 4:00 pm		Bowie State	W 83–55		14 – Watson	9 – Holt	5 – Tied	Dunkin' Donuts Center (4,895); Providence, RI
Non-conference regular season
November 6, 2018*; 6:30 pm, FSN		Siena; Hall of Fame Tip Off campus-site game	W 77–67	1–0	29 – Reeves	11 – Diallo	5 – Diallo	Dunkin' Donuts Center (8,021); Providence, RI
November 9, 2018*; 6:00 pm, CBSSN		vs. Wichita State; Veterans Classic	L 80–83	1–1	27 – Diallo	10 – Diallo	5 – Tied	Alumni Hall (5,710); Annapolis, MD
November 13, 2018*; 7:00 pm, FS2		Holy Cross; Hall of Fame Tip Off campus-site game	W 70–61	2–1	18 – Diallo	10 – Tied	5 – White	Dunkin' Donuts Center (6,042); Providence, RI
November 17, 2018*; 2:30 pm, ESPN3		vs. South Carolina; Hall of Fame Tip Off Naismith semifinals	W 76–67	3–1	20 – Duke	9 – Diallo	7 – Diallo	Mohegan Sun Arena (7,231); Uncasville, CT
November 18, 2018*; 1:30 pm, ESPN		vs. No. 18 Michigan; Hall of Fame Tip Off Naismith championship	L 47–66	3–2	12 – Duke	7 – Diallo	3 – Diallo	Mohegan Sun Arena; Uncasville, CT
November 24, 2018*; 4:00 pm, FSN		Iona	W 91–79	4–2	23 – Diallo	9 – Diallo	6 – White	Dunkin' Donuts Center (8,187); Providence, RI
November 27, 2018*; 8:30 pm, FS1		Fairleigh Dickinson	W 69–59	5–2	20 – Diallo	9 – Diallo	4 – Jackson	Dunkin' Donuts Center (4,879); Providence, RI
December 1, 2018*; 5:00 pm, FS1		Rhode Island; Ocean State Cup	W 59–50	6–2	15 – Reeves	9 – Jackson	3 – Tied	Dunkin' Donuts Center (12,997); Providence, RI
December 4, 2018*; 7:00 pm, ESPN2		at Boston College	W 100–95 ^{OT}	7–2	24 – Reeves	10 – Watson	9 – Duke	Conte Forum (5,453); Chestnut Hill, MA
December 7, 2018*; 7:00 pm, FS1		Massachusetts	L 78–79	7–3	21 – Diallo	7 – Diallo	5 – Diallo	Dunkin' Donuts Center (10,427); Providence, RI
December 16, 2018*; 2:00 pm, FS1		Central Connecticut	W 87–63	8–3	18 – White	9 – Nichols Jr.	6 – White	Dunkin' Donuts Center (6,876); Providence, RI
December 18, 2018*; 7:00 pm, FSN		Albany	W 73–43	9–3	20 – Diallo	10 – Diallo	5 – Ashton-Langford	Dunkin' Donuts Center (4,855); Providence, RI
December 21, 2018*; 9:00 pm, ESPN2		at Texas	W 71–65	10–3	20 – Diallo	8 – Young	5 – White	Frank Erwin Center (8,610); Austin, TX
Big East regular season
December 31, 2018; 4:00 pm, FS1		Creighton	L 68–79	10–4 (0–1)	18 – Diallo	10 – Diallo	4 – Tied	Dunkin' Donuts Center (11,343); Providence, RI
January 5, 2019; 2:00 pm, FOX		Villanova	L 59–65	10–5 (0–2)	20 – Ashton-Langford	8 – Watson	3 – White	Dunkin' Donuts Center (12,410); Providence, RI
January 12, 2019; 12:00 noon, FS1		at Georgetown	L 90–96 ^{2OT}	10–6 (0–3)	24 – Diallo	13 – Diallo	8 – Ashton-Langford	Capital One Arena (10,113); Washington, D.C.
January 15, 2019; 6:30 pm, FS1		Seton Hall	W 72–63	11–6 (1–3)	18 – Duke	8 – Diallo	5 – Tied	Dunkin' Donuts Center (11,367); Providence, RI
January 20, 2019; 12:00 pm, CBSSN		at No. 15 Marquette	L 68–79	11–7 (1–4)	21 – Watson	7 – Jackson	7 – Ashton-Langford	Fiserv Forum (17,524); Milwaukee, WI
January 23, 2019; 6:30 pm, FS1		at Xavier	W 64–62	12–7 (2–4)	13 – Jackson	6 – Tied	5 – Diallo	Cintas Center (10,142); Cincinnati, OH
January 27, 2019; 12:00 pm, FS1		DePaul	W 70–67	13–7 (3–4)	20 – Diallo	0 – Diallo	4 – Jackson	Dunkin' Donuts Center (12,009); Providence, RI
January 30, 2019; 7:00 pm, FSN		at Seton Hall	L 63–65	13–8 (3–5)	21 – Diallo	7 – Jackson	5 – Ashton-Langford	Prudential Center (7,858); Newark, NJ
February 2, 2019; 2:30 pm, FS1		at DePaul	L 55–67	13–9 (3–6)	17 – Duke	8 – Diallo	4 – Diallo	Wintrust Arena (5,173); Chicago, IL
February 6, 2019; 7:30 pm, FS1		Georgetown	L 67–76	13–10 (3–7)	22 – Diallo	6 – Diallo	4 – Jackson	Dunkin' Donuts Center (12,115); Providence, RI
February 9, 2019; 12:00 pm, CBSSN		at St. John's	W 70–56	14–10 (4–7)	18 – Watson	15 – Diallo	3 – Tied	Madison Square Garden (16,268); New York, NY
February 13, 2019; 6:30 pm, FS1		at No. 13 Villanova	L 67–85	14–11 (4–8)	18 – Watson	7 – Diallo	6 – Jackson	Finneran Pavilion (6,501); Villanova, PA
February 16, 2019; 2:00 pm, FOX		Xavier	L 61–75	14–12 (4–9)	16 – Watson	7 – Young	2 – Tied	Dunkin' Donuts Center (12,410); Providence, RI
February 20, 2019; 8:30 pm, FS1		St. John's	W 78–59	15–12 (5–9)	21 – Watson	11 – Diallo	5 – Jackson	Dunkin' Donuts Center (9,872); Providence, RI
February 23, 2019; 12:00 pm, FOX		No. 11 Marquette	L 58–76	15–13 (5–10)	19 – Diallo	8 – Duke	3 – Diallo	Dunkin' Donuts Center (12,890); Providence, RI
February 26, 2019; 7:00 pm, FS1		at Butler	W 73–67	16–13 (6–10)	21 – Watson	7 – Diallo	4 – Ashton-Langford	Hinkle Fieldhouse (8,149); Indianapolis, IN
March 6, 2019; 8:00 pm, CBSSN		at Creighton	L 70-76 ^{OT}	16-14 (6-11)	21 – Jackson	12 – Diallo	4 – Jackson	CHI Health Center Omaha (16,903); Omaha, NE
March 9, 2019; 12:00 pm, FSN		Butler	W 83–70	17–14 (7–11)	24 – Reeves	9 – Diallo	6 – White	Dunkin' Donuts Center (12,004); Providence, RI
Big East tournament
March 13, 2019; 7:00 pm, FS1	(8)	vs. (9) Butler; First round	W 80–57	18–14	19 – White	8 – Diallo	5 – White	Madison Square Garden; New York, NY
March 14, 2019; 12:00 pm, FS1	(8)	vs. (1) No. 25 Villanova; Quarterfinals	L 62–73	18–15	15 – Watson	10 – Reeves	3 – Tied	Madison Square Garden; New York, NY
NIT
March 19, 2019*; 9:00 pm, ESPN2	(4)	(5) Arkansas; First round – Indiana bracket	L 72–84	18–16	19 – White	11 – Diallo	4 – Tied	Dunkin' Donuts Center (3,057); Providence, RI
*Non-conference game. ^{#}Rankings from AP Poll. (#) Tournament seedings in parentheses. All times are in Eastern Time.
