= 2018–19 Butler Bulldogs men's basketball team =

American college basketball season

2018–19 Butler Bulldogs men's basketball

NIT, First round
- Conference: Big East Conference
- Record: 16–17 (7–11 Big East)
- Head coach: LaVall Jordan (2nd season)
- Assistant coaches: Jeff Meyer (5th season); Emerson Kampen (3rd season); Omar Lowery (2nd season)
- Home arena: Hinkle Fieldhouse

2018–19 Big East men's basketball standings
	Conf.				Overall
Team	W		L	PCT	W		L	PCT
No. 23 Villanova †	13	–	5	.722	26	–	10	.722
Marquette	12	–	6	.667	24	–	10	.706
Seton Hall	9	–	9	.500	20	–	14	.588
Xavier	9	–	9	.500	19	–	16	.543
Creighton	9	–	9	.500	20	–	15	.571
Georgetown	9	–	9	.500	19	–	14	.576
St. John's	8	–	10	.444	21	–	13	.618
Providence	7	–	11	.389	18	–	16	.529
Butler	7	–	11	.389	16	–	17	.485
DePaul	7	–	11	.389	19	–	17	.528
† 2019 Big East tournament winner Rankings from AP Poll

The 2018–19 Butler Bulldogs men's basketball team represented Butler University in the 2018–19 NCAA Division I men's basketball season. They were coached by LaVall Jordan, in his second year as head coach of his alma mater. The Bulldogs played their home games at Hinkle Fieldhouse in Indianapolis, Indiana as members of the Big East Conference. They finished the season 16–17, 7–11 in Big East play which tied them for eighth place. As the No. 9 seed in the Big East tournament, they were defeated by Providence in the quarterfinals. The Bulldogs received an at-large bid to the NIT as the No. 5 seed in the TCU bracket. There they were defeated in the first round by Nebraska to end the season.

== Previous season ==
The Bulldogs finished the 2017–18 season 21–14, 9–9 in Big East play to finish a tie for sixth place. As the No. 6 seed in the Big East tournament, they defeated Seton Hall before losing to Villanova in the semifinals. They received an at-large bid to the NCAA tournament as the No. 10 seed in the Midwest region. There they defeated Arkansas in the first round before losing to Purdue in the second round.

== Offseason ==
=== Departures ===
Name	Number	Pos.	Height	Weight	Year	Hometown	Notes
Kelan Martin	30	F	6'7"	220	Senior	Louisville, KY	Graduated
Tyler Wideman	4	F	6'8"	240	Senior	Merrillville, IN	Graduated

=== 2018 recruiting class ===
College recruiting
Name	Hometown	School	Height	Weight	Commit date
Markeese Hastings; SF	Grand Rapids, MI	Godwin Heights High School	6 ft 6 in (1.98 m)	190 lb (86 kg)	Nov 11, 2017
Markeese Hastings; SF	Recruit ratings: Scout: Rivals: 247Sports: ESPN:				
Bryce Golden; PF	Hagerstown, MD	St. James School	6 ft 9 in (2.06 m)	230 lb (100 kg)	Apr 30, 2018
Bryce Golden; PF	Recruit ratings: Scout: Rivals: 247Sports: ESPN:				
Overall recruit ranking:
Note: In many cases, Scout, Rivals, 247Sports, On3, and ESPN may conflict in their listings of height and weight.; In these cases, the average was taken. ESPN grades are on a 100-point scale.; Sources: "2018 Butler Commits". Rivals.; "2018 Team Ranking". Rivals.

=== Incoming transfers ===
Name	Number	Pos.	Height	Weight	Year	Hometown	Notes
Jordan Tucker	1	F	6'7"	210	Sophomore	White Plains, NY	Transferred from Duke prior to the Spring 2018 semester. He became eligible when the Fall 2018 semester concluded, and has two and a half years of remaining eligibility.
Bryce Nze	10	F	6'7"	230	Sophomore	Hartland, WI	Transferred from Milwaukee. Under NCAA transfer rules, Nze will redshirt for the 2018–19 season and have two years of remaining eligibility.

== Roster ==
2018–19 Butler Bulldogs men's basketball team
Players
Coaches

Pos.	#	Name	Height	Weight	Year	Previous school	Hometown
C	51	Nate Fowler	6 ft 10 in (2.08 m)	240 lb (109 kg)	Sr	Archbishop Moeller	Cincinnati, OH
G	5	Paul Jorgensen	6 ft 2 in (1.88 m)	185 lb (84 kg)	RS Sr	Don Bosco Prep (George Washington)	New City, NY
G/F	20	Henry Baddley	6 ft 4 in (1.93 m)	180 lb (82 kg)	Jr	St. Vincent–St. Mary	Wadsworth, OH
G	3	Kamar Baldwin	6 ft 1 in (1.85 m)	195 lb (88 kg)	Jr	Apalachee	Winder, GA
G	22	Sean McDermott	6 ft 6 in (1.98 m)	195 lb (88 kg)	RS Jr	Pendleton Heights	Pendleton, IN
C	50	Joey Brunk	6 ft 11 in (2.11 m)	230 lb (104 kg)	RS So	Southport	Indianapolis, IN
F	25	Christian David	6 ft 6 in (1.98 m)	200 lb (91 kg)	So	Vermont Academy	Milton, Ontario
G	0	Campbell Donovan (W)	5 ft 11 in (1.8 m)	170 lb (77 kg)	So	Bishop Dwenger	Fort Wayne, IN
G/F	21	Jerald Gillens-Butler	6 ft 4 in (1.93 m)	230 lb (104 kg)	So	Calvary Christian Academy	Fort Lauderdale, FL
G	2	Aaron Thompson	6 ft 2 in (1.88 m)	185 lb (84 kg)	So	Paul VI Catholic	Glenn Dale, MD
F	10	Bryce Nze (redshirt)	6 ft 7 in (2.01 m)	225 lb (102 kg)	RS So	Arrowhead (Milwaukee)	Hartland, WI
F	1	Jordan Tucker	6 ft 7 in (2.01 m)	210 lb (95 kg)	So	Wheeler (Duke)	White Plains, NY
F	33	Bryce Golden	6 ft 9 in (2.06 m)	250 lb (113 kg)	Fr	St. James School	Winchester, VA
F	24	Markeese Hastings (redshirt)	6 ft 7 in (2.01 m)	190 lb (86 kg)	Fr	Godwin Heights	Wyoming, MI

Head coach

- LaVall Jordan (Butler)

Assistant coach(es)

- Jeff Meyer (Taylor)
- Emerson Kampen (Butler)
- Omar Lowery (Concordia (WI))

Legend

- (C) Team captain
- (S) Suspended
- (I) Ineligible
- (W) Walk-on
- Injured
- Current redshirt

Roster
Last update: July 12, 2018

== Schedule and results ==
- Date time, TV	Rank^{#}	Opponent^{#}	Result	Record	High points	High rebounds	High assists	Site (attendance) city, state
  Exhibition
  October 28, 2018*; 2:00 pm		Tiffin	W 100–63	–	17 – Baldwin	8 – Tied	5 – Baldwin	Hinkle Fieldhouse (7,454); Indianapolis, IN
  November 3, 2018*; 4:00 pm		Southern Indiana	W 79–58	–	24 – Jorgensen	7 – Brunk	4 – Baldwin	Hinkle Fieldhouse (7,805); Indianapolis, IN
  Non-conference regular season
  November 10, 2018*; 7:00 pm, FSN		Miami (OH); Battle 4 Atlantis campus-site game	W 90–68	1–0	21 – Baldwin	7 – Tied	6 – Baldwin	Hinkle Fieldhouse (9,171); Indianapolis, IN
  November 12, 2018*; 6:30 pm, FS1		Detroit Mercy	W 84–63	2–0	26 – Baldwin	8 – Baldwin	6 – Baldwin	Hinkle Fieldhouse (7,741); Indianapolis, IN
  November 16, 2018*; 8:00 pm, FS2		Ole Miss	W 83–76	3–0	27 – Jorgensen	8 – Baldwin	5 – Baldwin	Hinkle Fieldhouse (8,328); Indianapolis, IN
  November 21, 2018*; 7:00 pm, ESPNews		vs. Dayton; Battle 4 Atlantis Quarterfinals	L 64–69	3–1	18 – Tied	7 – Fowler	7 – Baldwin	Imperial Arena (1,452); Nassau, Bahamas
  November 22, 2018*; 9:30 pm, ESPNU		vs. Middle Tennessee; Battle 4 Atlantis consolation	W 84–53	4–1	21 – Tied	5 – Tied	8 – Thompson	Imperial Arena (953); Nassau, Bahamas
  November 23, 2018*; 9:30 pm, ESPNU		vs. Florida; Battle 4 Atlantis 5th place game	W 61–54	5–1	19 – Baldwin	7 – Jorgensen	5 – Baldwin	Imperial Arena (1,140); Nassau, Bahamas
  December 1, 2018*; 5:00 pm, FSMW		at Saint Louis	L 52–64	5–2	12 – McDermott	9 – Tied	2 – Thompson	Chaifetz Arena (9,572); St. Louis, MO
  December 5, 2018*; 7:00 pm, FSN		Brown	W 70–55	6–2	19 – Jorgensen	6 – Thompson	4 – Tied	Hinkle Fieldhouse (7,361); Indianapolis, IN
  December 8, 2018*; 4:30 pm, FS1		Northern Illinois	W 95–68	7–2	23 – McDermott	7 – Baldwin	9 – Thompson	Hinkle Fieldhouse (8,247); Indianapolis, IN
  December 15, 2018*; 3:45 pm, CBS		vs. No. 25-T Indiana; Crossroads Classic	L 68–71	7–3	20 – McDermott	6 – McDermott	5 – Thompson	Bankers Life Fieldhouse (18,743); Indianapolis, IN
  December 18, 2018*; 8:30 pm, FS1		Presbyterian	W 76–67	8–3	18 – Thompson	8 – Brunk	7 – Thompson	Hinkle Fieldhouse (6,821); Indianapolis, IN
  December 21, 2018*; 6:30 pm, FS1		UC Irvine	W 71–54	9–3	19 – Jorgensen	7 – Jorgensen	7 – Thompson	Hinkle Fieldhouse (7,732); Indianapolis, IN
  December 29, 2018*; 4:00 pm, ESPNU		at Florida	L 43–77	9–4	9 – Baldwin	3 – Baldwin	2 – Tied	Exactech Arena (9,814); Gainesville, FL
  Big East regular season
  January 2, 2019; 7:00 pm, FSN/MASN2		Georgetown	L 76–84	9–5 (0–1)	15 – Baddley	8 – Tied	5 – Thompson	Hinkle Fieldhouse (8,876); Indianapolis, IN
  January 5, 2019; 12:00 pm, FS1		Creighton	W 84–69	10–5 (1–1)	28 – Baldwin	8 – McDermott	7 – Baldwin	Hinkle Fieldhouse (9,148); Indianapolis, IN
  January 9, 2018; 8:30 pm, FS1		at Seton Hall	L 75–76	10–6 (1–2)	23 – Baldwin	10 – Brunk	3 – Tied	Prudential Center (7,640); Newark, NJ
  January 13, 2019; 12:00 pm, CBSSN		at Xavier	L 69–70	10–7 (1–3)	18 – Baldwin	8 – Tucker	7 – Baldwin	Cintas Center (10,144); Cincinnati, OH
  January 16, 2019; 9:30 pm, FS1		at DePaul	W 87–69	11–7 (2–3)	19 – Tucker	14 – Baldwin	5 – Baldwin	Wintrust Arena (4,616); Chicago, IL
  January 19, 2019; 4:30 pm, FOX		St. John's	W 80–71	12–7 (3–3)	30 – Baldwin	12 – McDermott	3 – Tied	Hinkle Fieldhouse (9,121); Indianapolis, IN
  January 22, 2019; 7:00 pm, FS1		No. 18 Villanova	L 72–80	12–8 (3–4)	15 – Thompson	7 – McDermott	4 – Thompson	Hinkle Fieldhouse (8,962); Indianapolis, IN
  January 25, 2019; 8:30 pm, FS1		at Creighton	L 61–75	12–9 (3–5)	23 – Baldwin	5 – Tied	3 – Tied	CHI Health Center Omaha (18,089); Omaha, NE
  January 30, 2019; 6:30 pm, FS1		No. 10 Marquette	L 58–76	12–10 (3–6)	16 – Baldwin	6 – Fowler	4 – Thompson	Hinkle Fieldhouse (8,292); Indianapolis, IN
  February 2, 2019; 12:00 pm, FS1		Seton Hall	W 70–68	13–10 (4–6)	18 – Jorgensen	7 – McDermott	6 – Thompson	Hinkle Fieldhouse (9,102); Indianapolis, IN
  February 9, 2019; 12:00 pm, FSN/MASN2		at Georgetown	W 73–69	14–10 (5–6)	18 – Baldwin	5 – Tied	3 – Tied	Capital One Arena (13,345); Washington, D.C.
  February 12, 2019; 8:30 pm, CBSSN		at St. John's	L 73–77 ^{OT}	14–11 (5–7)	16 – Baldwin	9 – Jorgensen	4 – Thompson	Carnesecca Arena (5,602); Queens, NY
  February 16, 2019; 8:00 pm, FS1		DePaul	W 91–78	15–11 (6–7)	25 – Baldwin	6 – McDermott	5 – Tied	Hinkle Fieldhouse (9,100); Indianapolis, IN
  February 20, 2019; 9:00 pm, CBSSN		at No. 11 Marquette	L 69–79	15–12 (6–8)	27 – McDermott	8 – McDermott	2 – Tied	Fiserv Forum (14,600); Milwaukee, WI
  February 26, 2019; 7:00 pm, FS1		Providence	L 67–73	15–13 (6–9)	27 – Baldwin	6 – Baldwin	5 – Thompson	Hinkle Fieldhouse (8,149); Indianapolis, IN
  March 2, 2019; 2:00 pm, FOX		at Villanova	L 54–75	15–14 (6–10)	11 – Jorgenson	5 – Baldwin	4 – Thompson	Wells Fargo Center (17,515); Philadelphia, PA
  March 5, 2019; 6:00 pm, FS1		Xavier	W 71–66	16–14 (7–10)	24 – Baldwin	6 – Baldwin	4 – David	Hinkle Fieldhouse (8,551); Indianapolis, IN
  March 9, 2019; 12:00 pm, FSN		at Providence	L 70–83	16–15 (7–11)	17 – Jorgensen	4 – Tied	4 – Thompson	Dunkin' Donuts Center (12,004); Providence, RI
  Big East tournament
  March 13, 2019; 7:00 pm, FS1	(9)	vs. (8) Providence; Quarterfinals	L 57–80	16–16	14 – Tucker	5 – Fowler	6 – Thompson	Madison Square Garden (19,812); New York, NY
  NIT
  March 20, 2019*; 9:00 pm, ESPN2	(5)	at (4) Nebraska; First round – TCU bracket	L 76–80	16–17	14 – McDermott	7 – McDermott	12 – Thompson	Pinnacle Bank Arena (10,103); Lincoln, NE
  *Non-conference game. ^{#}Rankings from AP Poll. (#) Tournament seedings in parentheses. All times are in Eastern Time.

== Rankings ==
Ranking movements Legend: ██ Increase in ranking ██ Decrease in ranking — = Not ranked RV = Received votes
	Week																			
Poll	Pre	1	2	3	4	5	6	7	8	9	10	11	12	13	14	15	16	17	18	Final
AP	RV	RV	RV	—	—	—														Not released
Coaches	RV	RV^	RV	RV	—	—														

*AP does not release post-NCAA tournament rankings
^Coaches did not release a Week 1 poll.

== Awards ==
Name	Award(s)
Kamar Baldwin	Preseason All-Big East First Team

== See also ==
2018–19 Butler Bulldogs women's basketball team
