= 2018–19 Georgetown Hoyas men's basketball team =

American college basketball season

2018–19 Georgetown Hoyas men's basketball

NIT, first round
- Conference: Big East
- Record: 19–14 (9–9 Big East)
- Head coach: Patrick Ewing (2nd season)
- Assistant coaches: Louis Orr; Robert Kirby; Akbar Waheed
- Captain: No captain
- Home arena: Capital One Arena

2018–19 Big East men's basketball standings
	Conf.				Overall
Team	W		L	PCT	W		L	PCT
No. 23 Villanova †	13	–	5	.722	26	–	10	.722
Marquette	12	–	6	.667	24	–	10	.706
Seton Hall	9	–	9	.500	20	–	14	.588
Xavier	9	–	9	.500	19	–	16	.543
Creighton	9	–	9	.500	20	–	15	.571
Georgetown	9	–	9	.500	19	–	14	.576
St. John's	8	–	10	.444	21	–	13	.618
Providence	7	–	11	.389	18	–	16	.529
Butler	7	–	11	.389	16	–	17	.485
DePaul	7	–	11	.389	19	–	17	.528
† 2019 Big East tournament winner Rankings from AP Poll

The 2018–19 Georgetown Hoyas men's basketball team represented Georgetown University in the 2018–19 NCAA Division I men's basketball season. The Hoyas, led by second-year head coach Patrick Ewing, played their home games at the Capital One Arena in Washington, D.C., as members of the Big East Conference. They finished the season 19–14, 9–9 in Big East play to finish in a four-way tie for third place. As the No. 6 seed in the Big East tournament, they lost to Seton Hall in the quarterfinals. They received a bid to the National Invitation Tournament as the No. 3 seed in the UNC Greensboro bracket where they lost in the first round to Harvard.

== Previous season ==
The Hoyas finished the 2017–18 season at 15–15, 5–13 in Big East play, to finish in eighth place in the conference. As the No. 8 seed in the Big East tournament, they lost in the first round to St. John's. Georgetown finished the season without a winning record for the third straight year, the first time that had happened since the 1971–72, 1972–73, and 1973–74 seasons, and without participating in a postseason tournament in three consecutive years for the first time since 1972, 1973, and 1974.

== Offseason ==
=== Departures ===
Name	Number	Pos.	Height	Weight	Year	Hometown	Reason
Jonathan Mulmore	2	G	6'4"	185	Senior	New Orleans, LA	Graduated
Ra'Mond Hines	10	G	6'4"	175	Senior	Washington, D.C.	Graduated
Chris Sodom	12	C	7'3"	220	Freshman	Kaduna, Nigeria	Dismissed from team; transferred to George Washington
Trey Dickerson	13	G	6'0"	185	Senior	Queens, NY	Graduated
Marcus Derrickson	24	F	6'7"	250	Junior	Bowie, MD	Declared for 2018 NBA draft

=== Incoming transfers ===
Name	Number	Pos.	Height	Weight	Year	Hometown	Previous school
Ömer Yurtseven	44	C	7'0"	240	Junior	Istanbul, Turkey	North Carolina State

=== 2018 recruiting class ===
College recruiting
Name	Hometown	School	Height	Weight	Commit date
Grayson Carter; C	Dallas, TX	Bishop Dunne High School	6 ft 8 in (2.03 m)	200 lb (91 kg)	Sep 9, 2017
Grayson Carter; C	Recruit ratings: Scout: Rivals: 247Sports: (82)				
Josh LeBlanc; PF	Baton Rouge, LA	Madison Prep Academy	6 ft 7 in (2.01 m)	213 lb (97 kg)	Oct 13, 2017
Josh LeBlanc; PF	Recruit ratings: Scout: Rivals: 247Sports: (82)				
Mac McClung; PG	Gate City, VA	Gate City High School	6 ft 2 in (1.88 m)	175 lb (79 kg)	Oct 15, 2017
Mac McClung; PG	Recruit ratings: Scout: Rivals: 247Sports: (79)				
James Akinjo; PG	Richmond, CA	Salesian High School	6 ft 0 in (1.83 m)	160 lb (73 kg)	Apr 16, 2018
James Akinjo; PG	Recruit ratings: Scout: Rivals: 247Sports: (81)				
Overall recruit ranking: Rivals: 60 (tie)
Note: In many cases, Scout, Rivals, 247Sports, On3, and ESPN may conflict in their listings of height and weight.; In these cases, the average was taken. ESPN grades are on a 100-point scale.; Sources: "2018 Team Ranking". Rivals.

== Season recap ==
In addition to center Chris Sodom – dismissed from the team at midseason, he had transferred to George Washington – Georgetown had lost four players since the conclusion of the previous season: guards Trey Dickerson, Jonathan Mulmore, and three-season walk-on Ra'Mond Hines had graduated, and, most notably, the team's second-leading scorer, forward Marcus Derrickson, had foregone his senior year of college to enter the 2018 National Basketball Association draft. However, a core of veteran players – junior Jagan Mosely and sophomore Jahvon Blair at guard, sophomores Jamorko Pickett and Antwan Walker at forward, and senior guard/forward Kaleb Johnson – returned. Junior forward George Muresan, the son of former NBA player Gheorghe Muresan, made the team as a walk-on for the third straight season. Forward Trey Mourning, who had missed the entire 2017–2018 season due to injury, also returned to action in 2018–2019 as a redshirt senior, and the team hoped his perimeter shooting talents would pay dividends on offense. Most significantly, center Jessie Govan, the team's top scorer, who initially had indicated after the end of the previous season that he, like Derrickson, would leave school to enter the 2018 NBA draft, had changed his mind and decided to play his senior year at Georgetown in 2018–2019.

A number of new players joined the team for the season. After sitting out the 2017–2018 season in accordance with NCAA transfer rules, forward Greg Malinowksi, a good perimeter shooter who previously had played for three seasons for William & Mary – where he had shot 40 percent in three-pointers during the 2016–2017 season – became eligible to play for the Hoyas as a redshirt senior, and it was hoped that he would fill the gap left by Derrickson's early departure for the NBA. Freshman forward Grayson Carter also joined the team, and freshman forward Jaden Robinson made the team as a walk-on. Also new to the team was junior center Ömer Yurtseven, who transferred from North Carolina State; under NCAA transfer rules, he had to sit out the season, but he was expected to begin play with the Hoyas in the 2019–2020 season.

The arrival of three freshman – guards Mac McClung and James Akinjo and forward Josh LeBlanc – generated optimism in the basketball program and among its fans. LeBlanc was a versatile forward, Akinjo was a skilled and high-scoring point guard, and McClung had risen to national attention in high school; he had set a Virginia state record for points scored in high school a single season with 1,153, beating the old record of 948 set by Allen Iverson.

On October 11, 2018, Georgetown issued a press release announcing that Antwan Walker had been dismissed from the team that day. After Walker had begun to emerge as an important contributor to Georgetown's frontcourt late the previous season and followed that up with a successful summer in Kenner League play in 2018, observers had speculated that he might start for the Hoyas in 2018–2019. His departure suggested greater playing time for Josh LeBlanc, Trey Mourning, Kaleb Johnson, and Greg Malinowski in the 2018–2019 season.

A preseason poll of Big East Conference coaches picked Georgetown to finish seventh in the Big East in 2018–2019. At the Big East's media day at Madison Square Garden in New York City on October 25, head coach Patrick Ewing dodged reporters′ questions about his expectations for the 2018–2019 squad, saying only that he was hoping for "a much better year" than in 2017–2018 and offering that "everything" about the team would have to get better for it to finish with more than the five conference wins it had the previous season. Ewing and Georgetown athletic director Lee Reed both believed that a good program had to be built slowly, and Ewing added, "Last year, I said we were building a foundation...Now we’re starting to put the building up." He indicated that in 2018–2019 he would place an emphasis on getting the Hoyas to play together well as a team.

=== Nonconference schedule ===
With Trey Mourning making the first start of his college career, the Hoyas began their season on November 6 with a victory at Capital One Arena against Maryland Eastern Shore, improving their all-time record against the Hawks to 9–0. Jessie Govan led the team with 13 points, while Josh LeBlanc had a double-double (11 points and 11 rebounds) in the first college game of his career. Jamorko Picket also scored 11 points, including three 3-pointers.

Four days later, the Hoyas began competition in the 2018 Jamaica Classic, the Hoyas′ first appearance in an in-season tournament or showcase event of Patrick Ewing's tenure as head coach. The Classic was an unbracketed, four-game showcase event, and under its format the Hoyas started by playing a game at Capital One Arena against Central Connecticut State. The Blue Devils kept the game close, trailing by only three points with four minutes remaining, but Jamorko Pickett sank two three-pointers as part of a 9–0 Georgetown run that clinched the Hoya win. Jessie Govan scored 26 points, James Akinjo contributed 13, and Pickett and Trey Mourning added 12 each.

Before continuing play in the Jamaica Classic, Georgetown took part in the Gavitt Tipoff Games, an annual competition played between the Big East Conference and the Big Ten Conference which matched eight Big East teams against eight Big Ten teams. Georgetown had played in the Gavitt Tipoff Games during the first two seasons of the competition, losing to Maryland in both 2015 and 2016, but had not participated in 2017. This season, the Hoyas went on the road to face Illinois on November 13 in the most hostile environment the team had yet faced with Patrick Ewing as head coach. Georgetown's freshmen were particularly effective, scoring 61.3 percent of Georgetown's points and making key plays, including 12 points by Mac McClung that included a steal and breakaway reverse dunk to complete a 9–2 Georgetown run and give the Hoyas a 75–72 lead with just under five minutes remaining, a 19-point, seven-assist game by James Akinjo that included a floater and ensuing free throw to give the Hoyas an 84–80 lead with 39 seconds left, and 14 points and seven rebounds by Josh LeBlanc. Jessie Govan and Jamorko Pickett blocked back-to-back shots in the final seconds and Govan and Jagan Mosely sank key free throws as time wound down to give Georgetown an 88–80 victory. Govan and Jahvon Blair each finished with 11 points. The Hoyas improved their all-time record against the Fighting Illini to 2–4, their all-time record in the Gavitt Tipoff Games to 1–2, and their season record to 3–0.

Georgetown then made its first overseas trip under Ewing, traveling to Jamaica to resume competition in the Jamaica Classic with two non-bracketed showcase games at the Montego Bay Convention Centre in Montego Bay. Ewing, a Jamaica native who had emigrated to the United States at the age of 12, had accepted the invitation to play in the Classic partly because he wanted to show his players his birth country, and because Jagan Moseley's father and Jahvon Blair's parents also had been born on the island. The first game, against unbeaten Loyola Marymount, was the first meeting of the schools since 1979; the Hoyas led by five points at halftime, but the Lions had a strong second half in which they built a lead of as many as 15 points before handing Georgetown its first loss of the season, 65–52, behind 27 points by senior guard James Batemon. Two days later, Georgetown bounced back in the next game, in which the Hoyas fell behind former Big East Conference rival South Florida by 11 points early in the second half but pulled out a victory in overtime. The Hoyas then returned to Capital One Arena for the final game of the Jamaica Classic, building a 22-point lead against Campbell before the Fighting Camels staged a second-half comeback – largely thanks to 45 points by senior guard Chris Clemons, 27 of them after halftime – that brought Campbell to within six points of the Hoyas with 12 seconds left before James Akinjo made four straight free throws to clinch the win for Georgetown. Jessie Govan had a double-double (20 points and 11 rebounds) against Loyola Marymount, 27 points against South Florida, and 13 in the Campbell game. Josh LeBlanc scored 12 points against Loyola Marymount, narrowly missed a double-double in the South Florida game with nine points and 10 rebounds, and scored 11 against Campbell. James Akinjo finished with 10 points against Loyola Marymount, 14 against South Florida, and 17 against Campbell. Trey Mourning led the Hoyas in the Campbell game with a double-double (27 points and 12 rebounds, both career highs) and three assists.

The Campbell game began a three-game homestand that saw the Hoyas also face Richmond, completing a home-and-home series between the Hoyas and Spiders that had begun the previous season, and Liberty, the Flames′ first game against a Big East opponent since playing Georgetown in 2012. Georgetown won both games to stretch its winning streak to four. Jessie Govan scored a game-high and season-high 29 points and pulled down nine rebounds against Richmond, while Mac McClung broke out of an early-season slump to score 16 points, James Akinjo contributed 13, and Greg Malinowski scored in double digits for the first time as a Hoya with 10. Although Liberty was ranked sixth in the United States in defense, the Hoyas shot 53 percent from the field against the Flames five days later and went 19–for–29 (65.5 percent) in free-throw attempts, with Akinjo scoring 19 points, Govan finishing with a double-double (17 points and 10 rebounds), McClung adding 12 points, and Josh LeBlanc grabbing 10 rebounds.

With a four-game winning streak and a record of 7–1, Georgetown next went on the road to meet Syracuse before a crowd of over 24,000 at the Carrier Dome. It was the fourth year in a row the two schools – bitter rivals throughout the 34-season history of the original Big East Conference of 1979–2013 – had met in non-conference play. During the first half, the Hoya defense held the Orange to 7-for-27 (25.9 percent) shooting from the field and junior guard Tyus Battle – who had scored a career-high 29 points at Capital One Arena in the previous season to lead Syracuse to a comeback win over the Hoyas – to 1-for-8 (12.5 percent) shooting. The Hoyas went into the locker room at halftime leading 35–22; it was the second-fewest points Syracuse had scored in a half in the 38-season history of the Carrier Dome. In the second half, Georgetown quickly took its largest lead of the game, 37–22. Then, however, Syracuse went on a 14–2 run that included 10 points by Battle, and closed to a 39–36 deficit. With 11:51 left to play, Syracuse closed to 48–47 on a Battle jumper. A three-pointer by Syracuse redshirt sophomore Travis Hughes gave the Orange a 50–48 lead – the first Syracuse lead since 5–3 – which Syracuse extended to a six-point advantage. The Hoyas closed to 60–59 on three straight three-pointers by Greg Malinowski, then tied the game at 60–60 before retaking the lead at 65–62 with 4:50 left to play. With Georgetown leading 66–64, Orange freshman guard Jalen Carey hit a desperation three-pointer to regain the lead for Syracuse at 67–66 with 2:35 remaining. Govan hit a jumper to give Georgetown a 68–67 lead before Battle sank a three to put Syracuse back in front, 70–68, with 1:28 left. With a little over a minute remaining, Govan hit a three-pointer to give Georgetown a 71–70 lead, but Battle – who finished with 26 points – sank a pull-up jumper with 2.5 seconds to play to once again give the Orange a comeback win, 72–71; it was Syracuse's fifth straight victory. In the second half, Syracuse shot 18-for-30 (60.0 percent) overall from the field, including 7 of 14 three-pointers. For the game, Georgetown committed 15 turnovers, and Syracuse scored 19 points off them. Govan had a double-double with 22 points and 12 rebounds, McClung finished with 18 points, and Malinowski had 11 off the bench, while Josh LeBlanc grabbed 12 rebounds in addition to scoring eight points. The game completed a four-year, four-game series between Georgetown and Syracuse, and it ended amid speculation that the schools would not play again in the near future, because the Atlantic Coast Conference′s decision to go to a 20-game schedule the following season would make it too difficult for the Orange to schedule Georgetown.

After a week off, Georgetown met SMU at Capital One Arena in the first game of a home-and-home series in which the Hoyas were scheduled to travel to play at SMU the following season. It was only the second meeting of the schools, and the first since Georgetown defeated SMU during the 1984 NCAA tournament in the days when Patrick Ewing was a Georgetown player. The Mustangs shot 10–for–25 (40.0 percent) from three-point range, while the Hoyas shot only 40 percent overall from the field and 4–for–18 (22.2 percent) from beyond the arc. In the final six minutes, the Hoyas missed seven of their eight field goal attempts, and the Mustangs sank five out of six free throws during the final minute to clinch the victory. Georgetown suffered back-to-back losses for the first time in the 2018–2019 season, falling to 7–3. Jessie Govan scored 17 points, James Akinjo contributed 16, and Mac McClung added 13.

The Hoyas concluded their non-conference schedule with three more home games, facing Appalachian State, Little Rock (coached by Patrick Ewing's onetime New York Knicks teammate Darrell Walker), and Howard. Georgetown pulled away from Appalachian State late in the game for a 10-point victory over the Mountaineers, but Trey Mourning suffered a concussion during the game and missed the next six games, leaving it to Josh LeBlanc to start in his place. In a shoot-out with Little Rock, Mac McClung scored a career-high 38 points and James Akinjo finished with a career-high 25 points, but Little Rock freshman forward Nikola Maric also had a career high with 27 points, and Trojans junior guard Ryan Pippins tied the game at 84–84 on a 30-foot (9.1-meter) three-pointer at the buzzer to force overtime. Little Rock took an 89–88 lead in overtime before McClung sparked a 12–2 Hoya run that finally clinched a 102–94 Georgetown victory. During the week between the Little Rock and Howard games, McClung suffered a sprained ankle that forced him to miss the next four games, but even with McClung and Mourning sidelined, the Hoyas decisively defeated Howard, 102–67, dealing the Bison their fourth straight loss, and giving Georgetown its first back-to-back 100-plus-point games since February 1966. In addition to their performances against Little Rock, McClung scored 14 points and Akinjo 17 points against Appalachian State. Jessie Govan finished with 12 points against Little Rock and had his fourth double-double of the season against Howard with 23 points and 11 rebounds. Josh LeBlanc had a double-double (10 points and 10 rebounds) against Appalachian State and another against Howard (22 points and 11 rebounds), the second and third double-doubles of his collegiate career. Greg Malinowski contributed 11 points in the Appalachian State game. Kaleb Johnson just missed a double-double against Little Rock, scoring 12 points and pulling down nine rebounds, while Jahvon Blair contributed 15 points and five assists in the Howard game. The Hoyas finished the nonconference portion of their schedule with a three-game winning streak and a record of 10–3.

The Little Rock game was the 1,400th Georgetown game broadcast by Rich Chvotkin, the radio voice of the Hoyas. Chvotkin had broadcast every Georgetown men's basketball game since his debut in the 1974-75 season opener with the exception of most of the games of the 1990–1991 season, which he missed when he mobilized for six months of United States Army Reserve service during the Gulf War shortly after calling the fourth game that year. Chvotkin's milestone was announced before the Little Rock game began and acknowledged with applause by the crowd at Capital One Arena as Chvotkin rose at courtside and waved in response.

=== Conference schedule ===
Georgetown opened its Big East conference schedule on January 2 with a win at Butler in which Greg Malinowski had his best game as a Hoya, scoring a career-high and game-high 26 points on 10-for-12 (83.3 percent) shooting from the field overall, going a career-best 6-for-7 (85.7 percent) from three-point range, and grabbing seven rebounds; he scored both the final six points of the first half and the first six points of the second half, moving Georgetown from a 38–34 deficit late in the first half to a 46–38 lead soon after halftime. Jessie Govan added 17 points and Josh LeBlanc and James Akinjo each contributed 12 against the Bulldogs. Three days later, the Hoyas faced St. John's – the 112th meeting of the schools – in Georgetown's Big East home opener at Capital One Arena. For the first time since the home game with St. John's the previous season, Georgetown had five players score in double figures – Jessie Govan with 25 points, James Akinjo with 17, Greg Malinowski and Jamorko Pickett with 13 each, and Josh LeBlanc with a double-double (12 points and 12 rebounds) – but St. John's also had five players score in double figures, led by junior guard Shamorie Ponds with 37 points, and the Red Storm won in overtime. It was the Red Storm's first victory on the road at Georgetown since January 18, 2003, snapping a 13-game St. John's losing streak in games played at Georgetown. It also ended Georgetown's second four-game winning streak of the year, and the Hoyas would not win more than two in a row for the rest of the season.

Four days later, Georgetown lost its second game in a row as the Hoyas made their first six three-pointers and pulled out to a 39–22 lead at Xavier, but went 3-for-21 from beyond the arc after that and blew their lead when Xavier went on a 17–0 run to tie the game at 39–39. Xavier denied the Hoyas an inside game by shifting to an effective zone defense late in the first half and won 81–75. Jessie Govan scored 27 points, James Akinjo added 13, and Greg Malinowski finished with 12, but the Hoyas lost to the Musketeers for the sixth time in a row and ninth time in the last 10 meetings, and their all-time record against Xavier fell to 4–14. For the season, Georgetown fell to 11–5 overall and 1–2 in the Big East.

Georgetown returned to Capital One Arena to open a three-game homestand by facing Providence. The game saw 26 ties and 13 lead changes and was tied at 73–73 at the end of regulation thanks to a long three-pointer at the buzzer by Mac McClung, who returned to action after sitting out four games with a sprained ankle and finished with 16 points. In the final seconds of the first overtime period, James Akinjo – who finished with 20 points and nine assists – hit three free throws and sank a three-pointer to tie the game at 86–86 as time ran out. In the second overtime, Jessie Govan made five free throws to clinch a 96–90 Georgetown win; Govan had a double-double (14 rebounds and a career-high 33 points that included two clutch three-pointers). The Hoyas evened their Big East record at 2–2 and improved to 12–5 on the year.

The Hoyas next hosted No. 15 Marquette, their first ranked opponent of the season. Since losing their conference opener, the Golden Eagles had won three straight. Trey Mourning returned to action after missing six games with a concussion. Marquette junior guard Markus Howard – the fourth-leading scorer in the United States at 25.8 points per game – did not score in three minutes of play before going to the bench for the remainder of the game with lower back pain. Georgetown trailed sometimes by as many as six points during the first half, but nonetheless went to the locker room at halftime with a 40–37 lead. The Hoyas pulled ahead by eight points soon after halftime, but then went five minutes without scoring during a 14–0 Marquette run that gave the Golden Eagles a 57–51 lead with 10:27 remaining in the game. Georgetown came back to tie the game at 60–60 on a Jessie Govan three-pointer with 7:49 left. Marquette junior guard/forward Sam Hauser – who finished with a career-high 31 points, scoring 22 of them in the second half – scored on a jumper in the paint to give the Golden Eagles a 72–70 lead with just over a minute left to play. With 12 seconds remaining, James Akinjo attempted to drive the basket but Marquette freshman forward Brendan Bailey blocked his shot; then, with Georgetown behind 72–71, Akinjo – who shot 1-for-10 from the field and scored eight points – ignored Ewing's called play to kick the ball out to a wide-open Govan for a potentially game-winning three-pointer and instead drove the basket again, resulting in Marquette sophomore forward Theo John blocking Akinjo's shot easily. Hauser clinched a 74–71 Marquette victory – the first time the Golden Eagles had won four straight Big East games since 2013 – with two free throws with 2.7 seconds left; Mac McClung's half-court desperation shot that followed came after the buzzer. McClung led the Hoyas with 24 points, Govan finished with 14 points and nine rebounds, and Kaleb Johnson had 12 points off the bench, It was Georgetown's third straight loss to Marquette and eighth consecutive loss to ranked teams since beating then-No. 11 Butler in January 2017. The loss dropped Georgetown to 2–3 in Big East play, leaving Georgetown under .500 in the conference after five Big East games for the third straight season. Discussing Akinjo's late-game choices after the game, Ewing said, "We just didn't play smart enough at the right time, or share the ball at the right time...Twice James [Akinjo] drove in there...At the end of the game we ran a play for either Jessie [Govan] or Mac [McClung] or him to get the shot and he drove it and they came and blocked the shot. There were two people open. [Akinjo] has to play smarter. I know he's a freshman, but it's not time to be freshmen anymore. It's the second half of his freshman year. We’re in the Big East, and these are games that you're not going to get back.”

The homestand ended with a game against Creighton, and Ewing showed his displeasure with Akinjo by relegating him to the bench, the first time in Akinjo's college career that he had not started. Akinjo nonetheless played 30 minutes and had a career-best 11 assists, but poor shot selection plagued him as it had in the Marquette game, and he went 2–for–9 from the field and scored only six points, giving him an offensive output in the Marquette and Creighton games combined of 14 points on 3-for-21 (14.3 percent) field-goal shooting. The Bluejays snapped a four-game losing streak and defeated the Hoyas despite a double-double (22 points and 12 rebounds) by Jessie Govan and 10 points each by Josh LeBlanc and Mac McClung. The Hoyas had again suffered back-to-back defeats and had lost four of their last five games, dropping to 12–7 overall and 2–4 in the Big East. Georgetown's six conference games all had been decided by six points or less, two of them in overtime.

The Hoyas traveled to Madison Square Garden for a rematch with St. John's, then returned home to close out January with a rematch with Xavier. Georgetown won both games, avenging defeats at the hands of both teams earlier in the month. Against the Red Storm, Mac McClung had a game-high 25 points, Jessie Govan contributed 20 points and nine rebounds, and Josh LeBlanc had a 15-point performance. Against the Musketeers at Capital One Arena four days later, James Akinjo broke out of his slump to score 10 points as part of a late-game 16–7 Hoya surge as Georgetown handed Xavier its fourth straight defeat; Akinjo went 7-for-7 in free throws and led all scorers with 23 points, while Josh LeBlanc added 17 points, Govan finished with 12 points, and McClung scored 11. The two-game winning streak got Georgetown back to .500 in Big East play at 4–4 and improved the team's overall record to 14–7.

Georgetown's first game in February was on the road against its second ranked opponent of the season, No. 14 Villanova, at the Wells Fargo Center. The Hoyas led 34–33 at halftime, but by the time 5:48 was left in the game, the Wildcats had pulled ahead 58–53. While Georgetown went scoreless for six minutes late in the game despite averaging 83.2 points per game for the season, the Wildcats extended their lead, with Villanova sophomore guard Collin Gillespie scoring a career-high 30 points on 6-for-11 (54.5 percent) shooting from three-point range and 10-for-12 (83.3 percent) in free throws, and Villanova went on to win 77–65. It was Villanova's tenth straight victory, and the Wildcats posted a Big East record of 9–0 for the first time since the 2009–2010 season. Villanova improved its record at the Wells Fargo Center since the 2012–2013 season to 32–3, while Georgetown suffered its sixth straight loss in games played at Villanova and fell back below .500 in Big East play at 4–5. James Akinjo led the Hoyas with 19 points, while Jamorko Pickett finished with 10 and Trey Mourning came off the bench to add 12.

Three days later, Georgetown visited Providence and came away with a road win, sweeping the season series with the Friars and dealing them their third straight loss. The Hoyas outrebounded the Friars 50–33 and outshot them both from the field overall, 44 percent to 37 percent, and from three-point range, hitting 7-of-18 shots (38.9 percent) from beyond the arc to Providence's 4-of-22 (18.2 percent). In a balanced attack by Georgetown's starters, Josh LeBlanc led Georgetown, finishing with a double-double (17 points and 11 rebounds), and Mac McClung had 13 points, six rebounds, and five assists, while Jessie Govan contributed 13 points, Jamorko Picket scored 12, and James Akinjo had 10 points and eight assists. The win again brought Georgetown to .500 in the Big East at 5–5, equaling their conference win total for the entire year in each of the previous two seasons, but two losses soon followed, a narrow one to Butler at Capital One Arena and a rout at Seton Hall that saw the Pirates take a 20-point lead early in the game in what Ewing described as Georgetown's worst performance in his two seasons as head coach. Against Butler, McClung scored 21 points, Pickett added 18, and Govan had 12 points and nine rebounds, while in the Seton Hall game Govan led the Hoyas with 20 points and Greg Malinowski scored 16 off the bench. In summarizing the loss at Seton Hall, the Associated Press described the Hoyas as "young and exciting," but added, "Unless they win a bundle down the stretch, or the conference tournament, they should be an NIT team."

After a week off, Georgetown hosted Villanova at Capital One Arena. The Wildcats had lost two of the four games they had played since defeating the Hoyas early in February, but still were ranked No. 17. Mac McClung led the team in the first half, scoring 17 points as the Hoyas as a team went 7-of-18 (38.9 percent) from three-point range and built a 42–32 lead by halftime. In the second half, Villanova closed to 50–43 before Georgetown scored eight unanswered points to stretch its lead to 58–43 with 13:13 left to play. The Wildcats never got closer than nine points for the rest of the game, and the Hoyas came away with an upset 85–73 win. Georgetown outshot Villanova from the field 51 to 38 percent, and Georgetown's bench, led by Kaleb Johnson's eight points, outscored Villanova's 22–9. Jessie Govan had his Big East-leading eighth double-double of the season with 21 points and 11 rebounds, McClung also scored 21, and James Akinjo had 10 points and nine assists. The Hoyas snapped a nine-game losing streak against the Wildcats and beat them in a home game for the first time since January 2015. It was Georgetown's first victory over a ranked opponent since beating then-No. 11 Butler in January 2017, and it was the first time that a team coached by Patrick Ewing had defeated a Top 25 team in eight tries. It also was the first time that Villanova had lost back-to-back conference games in 104 Big East games it had played since joining the new Big East Conference in 2013. The win improved Georgetown's overall record to 16–10, exceeding its win total in each of the previous three seasons, and raised its conference record to 6–7.

Hoping to build momentum and make a case for a bid to the 2019 NCAA tournament, the Hoyas moved on to a game at Creighton three days later, but lost. Jahvon Blair led the team with 16 points, and Greg Malinowski scored 12, but overall the Hoyas came out flat for the game, their starters underperforming on offense and the team lacking a defensive solution for the Bluejays′ offense. After the game, Patrick Ewing declared that the NCAA Tournament was his team's goal, and that the loss had disappointed him because "“Great teams back up what they did,” referring to building momentum following the win over Villanova, while “[a] mediocre team did what we did today,” meaning take a step backwards after a signature win. Discussing the matter with The Washington Post three days after the loss at Creighton, Ewing said, "“We’ve been talking about our [Big East tournament] seeding and what our goals are, and our goal is to try to make the NCAAs. So we have to finish the season strong. We have to finish well in the Big East to have an opportunity to do that. I thought that the way we played versus Villanova, it was a great opportunity to build. We just didn't have the energy, the focus, the fire that we needed to play the way we needed to come away with a great road win at Creighton...We have to have a sense of urgency. We only have four games left, and we’re still right in the hunt. We do what we need to do, and we could end up as good as third in the Big East tournament. But we need to play with more of a sense of urgency than we did in our last outing.”

With that challenge from their coach and a growing sense that an NCAA Tournament bid was a possibility, the Hoyas returned to Capital One Arena for their final homestand of the season, with games against DePaul and Seton Hall. Georgetown dealt DePaul its fourth straight loss, with Jessie Govan scoring 26 points, Mac McClung finishing with 15 points, and James Akinjo adding 13 points and six assists. On Senior Day three days later, the Hoyas played their last game of the year at Capital One Arena and faced a tougher challenge in Seton Hall. Georgetown trailed 28–24 at halftime, before taking the lead in the second half, but Seton Hall redshirt senior guard Michael Nzei tied the game at 59–59 with a jumper at the end of regulation to force overtime. The Pirates again tied the game at 66–66 when Seton Hall freshman guard/forward Jared Rhoden scored on a buzzer-beating dunk off a fast break at the end of overtime. Govan scored all 11 of Georgetown's points in the second overtime, hitting a three-pointer with 3:20 remaining to give Georgetown a 71–69 lead, then, after the Pirates tied the game at 71–71, sinking one of two free throws, a second-chance layup, and finally two more free throws with 10 seconds left to clinch a 77–71 Georgetown victory and hand Seton Hall its third straight loss. The Hoyas gave up 35 points to Pirate junior guard Myles Powell, but Govan and Josh LeBlanc both finished with double-doubles, Govan scoring 21 points and grabbing 12 rebounds and LeBlanc adding 14 points and a career-high 17 rebounds, while James Akinjo contributed 16 points. The back-to-back wins gave Georgetown a record of 8–8 in the Big East and 18–11 overall.

Back on the bubble for an NCAA berth, and hoping to earn a No. 3 seed in the 2019 Big East tournament, the Hoyas went on a two-game road trip that began with a winnable rematch with ninth-place DePaul. However, both their offense and defense let them down; they had their worst shooting performance since the game at Villanova, with only James Akinjo and Mac McClung – with 13 points each – scoring in double figures, and their defense allowed four Blue Demons to score in double figures, including 30 points by redshirt senior guard Max Strus and 24 by senior guard Eli Cain. DePaul sank 14 three-pointers and scored 27 points off 15 Georgetown turnovers. DePaul pulled out to a 25–15 lead followed by a 17–0 run that stretched DePaul's lead to 42–15, and at halftime the Blue Demons led 54–31; the 54 points were the most DePaul had scored in the first half of a game all season. In the second half, the Hoyas closed to a 14-point deficit, but another DePaul run put the Blue Demons ahead by 38 points with just under three minutes to play, and DePaul won 101–69. The 32-point loss tied a loss at the hands of Villanova in January 2018 for Georgetown's biggest margin of defeat under Ewing, and it was the first time in Ewing's tenure as head coach that an opponent had scored 100 or more points against Georgetown. After the game, Ewing said, "“I don't have an answer for it. We’ve talked about the importance of this game for trying to lock in that third seed [in the Big East tournament]. And I just thought that we didn't come with the right energy and the right effort for whatever reason...I guess we thought we were just going to show up and it was just going to happen. The reason why I was so proud of my team last game [against Seton Hall] was we didn't start out playing particularly well, but our defense kept us in the game. Today, our defense was nonexistent. We couldn't stop anyone.” Ewing blamed the embarrassing loss on Georgetown's lack of energy and preparedness, saying “We didn't come ready to play. For as big of a game as this was for us, we didn't come out with the right energy, the right effort, intensity that we talked about from after our last game. To a man. No one was ready to play, in my opinion.” In the tightly packed Big East standings, the loss dropped the Hoyas all the way from third to seventh place.

Georgetown closed out its regular season on March 9 at No. 16 Marquette, its fourth and final meeting of the season with a ranked opponent. The Golden Eagles had lost three in a row, and were trying to avoid a fourth straight loss to end their season. The Golden Eagles led 39–37 at halftime and extended their lead to 60–53 with 10:57 left in the game, but the Hoyas came back to tie it at 63–63. Late in the game Jamorko Pickett sank a three-pointer to give Georgetown an 82–77 lead. Marquette redshirt freshman Joey Hauser responded with a three to reduce Georgetown's advantage to 82–80 with 46 seconds to play. Jessie Govan hit one of two free throws to make the score 83–80, but Marquette junior guard Markus Howard was fouled on the next possession and also hit one of two free throws to close to 83–81 with 11 seconds left. After James Akinjo made two free throws to extend Georgetown's lead to 85–81, Howard scored on a three-pointer to cut it to 85–84. Pickett then made the first of two free throws with 2 seconds to play, time expired during the struggle to grab the rebound after he missed the second, and the Hoyas upset the Golden Eagles 86–84. Marquette shot only 23–for-67 (34.3 percent) from the field, and went 26-for-36 (72.2 percent) from the free-throw line, below their 77-percent free-throw success rate for the season. Akinjo led the Hoyas with 25 points, Mac McClung added 23, and Govan and Pickett finished with 10 points each.

Georgetown concluded its regular season with a record of 19–12 overall and 9–9 in the Big East, in both cases their best record since the 2014–2015 season, and in a four-way tie for third place in the Big East, its best finish in the conference since the 2014–2015 season. It was also the Hoyas′ first overall winning record and first non-losing conference season since the 2014–2015 season. They had gone 2–2 against Top 25 teams, but had played inconsistently, winning back-to-back Big East games only twice all season. Speaking after the victory over Marquette, Ewing said, "We had a great win today and it would be a shame if we don't follow it up on Thursday" – in Georgetown's first game of the upcoming Big East tournament – "with another great performance. So, we have to build on it."

=== Big East tournament ===
Under tie-breaking criteria, Georgetown was seeded sixth in the 2019 Big East tournament and received a first-round bye in the tournament for the first time since 2015. In the quarterfinals, the Hoyas faced Seton Hall, which, like Georgetown had finished at 9–9 and in a four-way tie for third place in the regular season but had been seeded third based on tie-breakers. In a decisive first half, Pirates junior guard Myles Powell scored 29 points – a tournament record for a single half, beating the 27 points Doug McDermott scored for Creighton in a single half in a game against DePaul during the 2014 tournament – shooting 10-for-14 (71.4 percent) from the field overall and 4-for-7 (57.1 percent) in three-pointers, and he finished the half by scoring 13 straight points that included three three-pointers and an end-to-end drive for a layup. Georgetown, meanwhile, committed 10 turnovers during the half that resulted in 20 Seton Hall points, and the Pirates led 53–28 at halftime. Powell cooled off after halftime, but the Hoyas never got closer than 14 points, and Seton Hall won 73–57, knocking Georgetown out of the tournament. James Akinjo led the Hoyas with 15 points, and was the only Hoya to score in double figures.

=== National Invitation Tournament ===
The blowout loss in the first game of the Big East tournament dashed the Hoyas′ hopes of playing their way into a 2019 NCAA tournament bid, and Georgetown missed the NCAA Tournament for a fourth straight season, the first time that had happened since a four-year drought from the 2001–2002 through 2004–2005 seasons. However, the Hoyas did receive an invitation to the 2019 National Invitation Tournament. It was their first NIT appearance since 2014, and their first postseason tournament appearance of any kind since they played in the 2015 NCAA tournament. The 2019 NIT used a number of experimental rules, including a three-point line set approximately 20 inches (51 cm) farther from the basket to match the distance used by the International Basketball Federation (FIBA); a free-throw lane widened from 12 to 16 feet (3.7 to 4.9 meters), the width used in the National Basketball Association; a shot clock that reset to 20 seconds instead of 30 seconds after an offensive rebound; the elimination of one-and-one free throws; and team foul totals that reset to zero at the 10-minute mark of each half for the purpose of determining free throws, with teams shooting two bonus free throws after the fifth team foul of each 10-minute segment and awarded two bonus free throws after the second team foul committed under two minutes remaining in each half if that foul occurred before the fifth team foul of the segment, with team fouls resetting in each overtime period and teams shooting two free throws beginning with the fourth team foul or the second team foul committed under two minutes remaining if that came before the fourth team foul of the overtime period.

Seeded third in one of the NIT's brackets, Georgetown faced Harvard, the No. 6 seed, in the first game. Harvard had qualified automatically for the NIT by winning the Ivy League regular-season championship and had missed an NCAA Tournament bid by losing to Yale in the championship game of the 2019 Ivy League tournament. The two schools had not met since December 2009. As the higher seed, Georgetown hosted the game, but with Capital One Arena booked to host a Washington Capitals National Hockey League game, the Hoyas met the Crimson at a packed McDonough Gymnasium in Georgetown's first on-campus game since November 2016. The crowd included United States Supreme Court Justice Elena Kagan, a Harvard Law School alumna.

The Hoyas appeared to put out a lax effort during the game, and Harvard led 13–6 after only four minutes of play. By halftime, the Crimson had outrebounded the Hoyas 21–14, although Georgetown led, 36–35. The Hoyas did not score for nearly nine minutes during the second half and trailed for most of the last 10 minutes of the game. With 38 seconds to play, however, Jessie Govan hit a three-pointer to bring the Hoyas within one point at 69–68. James Akinjo then fouled Harvard's leading scorer, junior guard Bryce Aiken, who sank both free throws to put Harvard ahead 71–68 with 14 seconds remaining. On Georgetown's next possession, Govan attempted another three-pointer with seven seconds left, but missed; Greg Malinowski grabbed the rebound but could not get another three-point attempt off before the buzzer ended both the game and Georgetown's season as Harvard won, 71–68.

In his final game as a Hoya, Govan had a game-high 25 points, while Akinjo contributed 15, and Mac McClung finished with 10, but four Harvard players also finished in double figures. Although Harvard committed 16 turnovers to Georgetown's eight, the Crimson outrebounded the Hoyas 39–30. Georgetown's record fell to 3–1 all-time against Harvard. After the game, Ewing said, "I believe that we had a very good year. We won 15 games last year; we won 19 this year. Hopefully next year we'll make a lot more, make the NCAAs, and go far. Right now it hurts. I'm disappointed. It's a tough loss. Now we have to start going out to recruit and getting ready for next year. My seniors, I'd like to thank them for the hard work they've put in.”

=== Wrap-up ===
Georgetown's season ended with two straight first-round tournament eliminations and an overall record of 19–14. For the fourth straight season, the Hoyas never made the Top 25 in either the Associated Press Poll or the Coaches Poll – the first time that had happened in four consecutive seasons since 1996-1997, 1997-1998, 1998-1999, and 1999-2000. They also missed the NCAA Tournament for a fourth straight season, the first time that had happened since 2001, 2002, 2003, and 2004. However, they achieved a number of things that they had not since the 2014–2015 season, namely a winning season, a non-losing Big East Conference record, and a post-season tournament appearance, although like the other eight Hoya teams that had made the post-season since Georgetown's 2007 Final Four appearance, they had failed to advance beyond the first or second round of the NCAA Tournament or NIT, losing in the NIT's first round. But they had avoided the late-season losing streak that had befallen the Georgetown teams of the previous three seasons and had even shown signs of growth in defeating two ranked teams late in the year. Picked preseason to finish seventh in the Big East, they had finished in a four-way tie for third, and their No. 6 seed in the Big East tournament – one slot higher than predicted preseason – gave them their first first-round bye in the tournament since 2015.

For the second straight year, Jessie Govan was the team's leading scorer; he started all 33 games, shooting 49.6 percent from the field overall and 41.2 percent in three-pointers, averaging 17.5 points and leading the team with 7.5 rebounds per game. James Akinjo played in all 33 games and started all but one of them, and he averaged 13.4 points and 2.9 rebounds per game, shooting 36.5 percent from the field overall and 39.1 percent from three-point range. Mac McClung played in 29 games, starting all of them, shooting 39.2 percent in field-goal attempts and 27.7 percent from three-point range, and he averaged 13.1 points and 2.6 rebounds per game. Josh LeBlanc appeared in all 33 games and started 22, shooting 63.0 percent from the field overall and 71.4 percent from beyond the arc, averaging 9.1 points and 7.3 rebounds per game. Trey Mourning started 11 of the 26 games he played in, and he averaged 6.3 points per game on 43.5 percent shooting from the field as well as 3.8 rebounds per game. Jamorko Pickett played in 31 games, starting 23 of them, shooting 38.3 percent in field-goal attempts and 35.6 percent from three-point range, and he averaged 6.2 points and 3.8 rebounds per game. Playing in his only season as a Hoya, Greg Malinowski appeared in all 33 games, starting six of them, and averaged 5.7 points per game on 44.4 percent shooting from the field overall and 38.7 percent on three-pointers, and he pulled down 3.2 rebounds per game. Jahvon Blair came off the bench to play in 31 games, averaging 4.3 points per game on 35.6 percent field-goal shooting overall and 34.4 percent from three-point range, and he had 1.3 rebounds per game. Kaleb Johnson started two of the 31 games he played in; he ended the season with a field-goal percentage of 59.3 – 50.0 from three-point range – and with per-game averages of 4.3 points and 2.9 rebounds. Jagan Moseley played in 32 games and had seven starts, and he finished with 3.1 points and 1.9 rebounds per game, shooting 46.3 percent from the field and 36.7 percent from beyond the arc. Grayson Carter came off the bench in the 14 games he played in, and he averaged 1.1 points per game on 27.8 percent shooting from the field – 33.3 percent in three-point attempts – and grabbed 1.0 rebound per game. Walk-ons George Muresan and Jaden Robinson each played in one game.

Jessie Govan, Greg Malinowski, Trey Mourning, and Kaleb Johnson all graduated in 2019. In his 128-game career, Govan started 90 games, shooting 50.1 percent overall from the field and 40.8 percent from three-point range and averaging 13.0 points and 6.6 rebounds per game, and he scored 1,664 points. In addition to his only year at Georgetown, Malinowski had played for three seasons at William and Mary, and he finished his four-season college career having played in 128 games, starting 36 of them, shooting 42.9 percent from the field and 39.0 percent from three-point range and averaging 6.3 points and 3.1 rebounds per game. Mourning completed his 62-game college career with 11 starts, a field goal percentage of 43.9 percent – 15.3 percent from beyond the arc – and 3.2 points and 2.0 rebounds per game. Kaleb Johnson played in 124 college games, starting 35 of them, scoring 4.3 points per game on 54.4 percent shooting from the field overall and 37.2 percent from three-point range and averaging 2.7 rebounds per game. The Class of 2019 was the first graduating class since the Class of 2005 to spend its entire four years at Georgetown without ever playing in an NCAA Tournament game, and only the second to do since the Class of 1974.

At the end of April, the news broke that after the conclusion of the academic year freshman forward Grayson Carter would transfer to UT Arlington in search of greater playing time. He finished his only season as a Hoya having appeared in 14 games, all off the bench, playing a total of 66 minutes, shooting 27.8 percent from the field and 33.3 percent from three-point range, and averaging one rebound and 1.1 points per game. Under NCAA transfer rules, he had to sit out the 2019–2020 season, but would be eligible to play for the Mavericks beginning in the 2020–2021 season.

With a young team and an all-freshman backcourt, the 2018–19 Hoyas played inconsistently, often following impressive performances against strong – even ranked – opponents with lackluster losses to lesser foes, and failed to achieve the late-season momentum necessary to make a push for an NCAA Tournament bid or a deep run in the Big East tournament or the NIT. In reviewing the season after the first-round NIT loss to Harvard, the Casual Hoya website wrote, "For every rousing win, there was a deflating loss. For every meaningful stride by a freshman, there was a discouraging regression by a veteran. Seemingly every inspired, dogged performance was followed by a flat-footed one...the Hoyas...face questions, particularly related to coaching, where game preparation and defensive coherence too often were lacking." But the site broke the news the day before the Harvard loss that Jones County Junior College small forward Galen Alexander had decided to transfer to Georgetown with immediate eligibility the following season, and after the Harvard game described the season's freshman class as "excellent," recruits for the following season as "promising," and the program as "trending in the right direction." Patrick Ewing viewed the season as another step forward in restoring Georgetown's men's basketball program to the national prominence and success it had once enjoyed, and said that he believed that 19 wins and an NIT appearance represented important progress. His goal for the following season was for Georgetown to the return to the NCAA Tournament.

== Attendance ==
Georgetown averaged 7,212 fans per home game during the 2018–2019 season. It was a 30-year low for the Hoyas.

== Roster ==
2018–19 Georgetown Hoyas men's basketball team
Players
Coaches

Pos.	#	Name	Height	Weight	Year	Previous school	Hometown
G	0	Jahvon Blair	6 ft 3 in (1.91 m)	189 lb (86 kg)	So	Orangeburg Prep	Mono, Ontario
F	1	Jamorko Pickett	6 ft 7 in (2.01 m)	190 lb (86 kg)	So	Massanutten Military Academy	Washington, D.C.
G	2	Mac McClung	6 ft 2 in (1.88 m)	185 lb (84 kg)	Fr	Gate City High School	Gate City, Virginia
G	3	James Akinjo	6 ft 0 in (1.83 m)	160 lb (73 kg)	Fr	Salesian College Preparatory	Richmond, California
G	4	Jagan Mosely	6 ft 3 in (1.91 m)	205 lb (93 kg)	Jr	St. Anthony's	Morganville, New Jersey
F	5	Antwan Walker	6 ft 9 in (2.06 m)	230 lb (104 kg)	So	Massanutten Military Academy	Washington, D.C.
G	11	Greg Malinowski	6 ft 5 in (1.96 m)	215 lb (98 kg)	RS Sr	Episcopal High School; William & Mary	Chantilly, Virginia
C	15	Jessie Govan	6 ft 10 in (2.08 m)	270 lb (122 kg)	Sr	Wings Academy	Queens Village, New York
F	20	George Muresan (W)	6 ft 9 in (2.06 m)	210 lb (95 kg)	Jr	St. Andrew's	Potomac, Maryland
G	22	Jaden Robinson (W)	6 ft 3 in (1.91 m)	180 lb (82 kg)	Fr	Mount Saint Joseph	Baltimore, Maryland
F	23	Josh LeBlanc	6 ft 7 in (2.01 m)	213 lb (97 kg)	Fr	Madison Preparatory Academy	Baton Rouge, Louisiana
G/F	32	Kaleb Johnson	6 ft 6 in (1.98 m)	205 lb (93 kg)	Sr	Carlisle School	South Hill, Virginia
F	33	Trey Mourning	6 ft 9 in (2.06 m)	230 lb (104 kg)	RS Sr	Ransom Everglades School	Miami, Florida
F	35	Grayson Carter	6 ft 8 in (2.03 m)	200 lb (91 kg)	Fr	John H. Guyer High School	Dallas, Texas
C	44	Ömer Yurtseven (redshirt)	7 ft 0 in (2.13 m)	248 lb (112 kg)	Jr	Fenerbahce Baseketbol Subesi; NC State	Istanbul, Turkey

Head coach

- Patrick Ewing (Georgetown)

Assistant coach(es)

- Louis Orr (Syracuse)
- Robert Kirby (Texas-Rio Grande Valley)
- Akbar Waheed (Niagara)

Legend

- (C) Team captain
- (S) Suspended
- (I) Ineligible
- (W) Walk-on
- Injured
- Current redshirt

Roster

Note: Antwan Walker was dismissed from the team in October 2018.

== Schedule and results ==
Date time, TV	Rank^{#}	Opponent^{#}	Result	Record	High points	High rebounds	High assists	Site (attendance) city, state
Non-conference regular season
November 6, 2018*; 8:30 pm, FSN/MASN2		Maryland Eastern Shore	W 68–53	1–0	13 – Govan	11 – LeBlanc	7 – Akinjo	Capital One Arena (4,189); Washington, D.C.
November 10, 2018*; 6:00 pm, FS2		Central Connecticut; Jamaica Classic campus game	W 85–78	2–0	26 – Govan	8 – Govan	7 – Akinjo	Capital One Arena (5,270); Washington, D.C.
November 13, 2018*; 8:40 pm, FS1		at Illinois; Gavitt Tipoff Games	W 88–80	3–0	19 – Akinjo	7 – LeBlanc	7 – Akinjo	State Farm Center (14,656); Champaign, IL
November 16, 2018*; 7:00 pm, CBSSN		vs. Loyola Marymount; Jamaica Classic	L 52–65	3–1	20 – Govan	11 – Govan	3 – Mosely	Montego Bay Convention Centre (1,169); Montego Bay, Jamaica
November 18, 2018*; 12:10 pm, CBSSN		vs. South Florida; Jamaica Classic	W 76–73 ^{OT}	4–1	27 – Govan	10 – LeBlanc	5 – Akinjo	Montego Bay Convention Centre (6,788); Montego Bay, Jamaica
November 24, 2018*; 12:00 noon, FSN/MASN2		Campbell; Jamaica Classic campus game	W 93–85	5–1	27 – Mourning	12 – Mourning	4 – Akinjo	Capital One Arena (6,788); Washington, D.C.
November 28, 2018*; 7:00 pm, CBSSN		Richmond	W 90–82	6–1	29 – Govan	9 – Govan	8 – Mosely	Capital One Arena (4,912); Washington, D.C.
December 3, 2018*; 6:30 pm, FS2		Liberty	W 88–78	7–1	19 – Akinjo	10 – Govan	5 – Pickett	Capital One Arena (4,011); Washington, D.C.
December 8, 2018*; 3:30 pm, ESPN		at Syracuse; Rivalry	L 71–72	7–2	22 – Govan	12 – Govan	4 – Govan	Carrier Dome (24,082); Syracuse, NY
December 15, 2018*; 12:00 noon, FS1		SMU	L 73–81	7–3	17 – Govan	9 – LeBlanc	3 – Akinjo	Capital One Arena (6,763); Washington, D.C.
December 18, 2018*; 6:30 pm, FS1		Appalachian State	W 83–73	8–3	17 – Akinjo	10 – LeBlanc	4 – Akinjo	Capital One Arena (4,205); Washington, D.C.
December 22, 2018*; 12:00 noon, FSN/MASN2		Little Rock	W 102–94 ^{OT}	9–3	38 – McClung	9 – Tied	7 – Akinjo	Capital One Arena (5,189); Washington, D.C.
December 29, 2018*; 12:00 noon, FS1		Howard	W 102–67	10–3	23 – Govan	11 – LeBlanc	5 – Blair	Capital One Arena (7,519); Washington, D.C.
Big East regular season
January 2, 2019; 7:00 pm, FSN/MASN2		at Butler	W 84–76	11–3 (1–0)	26 – Malinowski	6 – Tied	4 – Malinowski	Hinkle Fieldhouse (8,876); Indianapolis, IN
January 5, 2019; 1:08 pm, CBS		St. John's	L 94–97 ^{OT}	11–4 (1–1)	25 – Govan	12 – LeBlanc	7 – Malinowski	Capital One Arena (11,115); Washington, D.C.
January 9, 2019; 6:30 pm, FS1		at Xavier	L 75–81	11–5 (1–2)	27 – Govan	8 – Tied	6 – Tied	Cintas Center (10,224); Cincinnati, OH
January 12, 2019; 12:00 noon, FS1		Providence	W 96–90 ^{2OT}	12–5 (2–2)	33 – Govan	14 – Govan	9 – Akinjo	Capital One Arena (10,113); Washington, D.C.
January 15, 2018; 8:45 pm, FS1		No. 15 Marquette	L 71–74	12–6 (2–3)	24 – McClung	9 – Govan	8 – Akinjo	Capital One Arena (7,945); Washington, D.C.
January 21, 2019; 8:45 pm, FS1		Creighton	L 87–91	12–7 (2–4)	22 – Govan	12 – Govan	11 – Akinjo	Capital One Arena (5,230); Washington, D.C.
January 27, 2019; 12:00 noon, FOX		at St. John's	W 89–78	13–7 (3–4)	25 – McClung	9 – Govan	7 – Akinjo	Madison Square Garden (17,801); New York, NY
January 31, 2019; 8:00 pm, CBSSN		Xavier	W 80–73	14–7 (4–4)	23 – Akinjo	6 – Govan	5 – McClung	Capital One Arena (7,636); Washington, D.C.
February 3, 2019; 12:00 noon, FS1		at No. 14 Villanova	L 65–77	14–8 (4–5)	19 – Akinjo	8 – LeBlanc	4 – Akinjo	Wells Fargo Center (14,506); Philadelphia, PA
February 6, 2019; 7:30 pm, FS1		at Providence	W 76–67	15–8 (5–5)	17 – LeBlanc	11 – LeBlanc	8 – Akinjo	Dunkin' Donuts Center (12,115); Providence, RI
February 9, 2019; 12:00 noon, FSN/MASN2		Butler	L 69–73	15–9 (5–6)	21 – McClung	9 – Govan	3 – Akinjo/Mosely	Capital One Arena (13,345); Washington, D.C.
February 13, 2019; 8:30 pm, FS1		at Seton Hall	L 75–90	15–10 (5–7)	20 – Govan	6 – Govan	5 – Mosely	Prudential Center (7,828); Newark, NJ
February 20, 2019; 6:30 pm, FS1		No. 17 Villanova	W 85–73	16–10 (6–7)	21 – Govan/McClung	11 – Govan	9 – Akinjo	Capital One Arena (11,624); Washington, D.C.
February 23, 2019; 2:40 pm, FOX		at Creighton	L 69–82	16–11 (6–8)	16 – Blair	7 – LeBlanc	8 – Akinjo	CHI Health Center Omaha (17,358); Omaha, NE
February 27, 2019; 7:05 pm, CBSSN		DePaul	W 82–73	17–11 (7–8)	26 – Govan	7 – LeBlanc	6 – Akinjo	Capital One Arena (5,176); Washington, D.C.
March 2, 2019; 6:30 pm, CBSSN		Seton Hall	W 77–71 ^{2OT}	18–11 (8–8)	21 – Govan	17 – LeBlanc	4 – Akinjo	Capital One Arena (13,753); Washington, D.C.
March 6, 2019; 8:45 pm, FS1		at DePaul	L 69–101	18–12 (8–9)	13 – Akinjo/McClung	8 – LeBlanc	7 – Akinjo	Wintrust Arena (4,756); Chicago, IL
March 9, 2019; 2:40 pm, FOX		at No. 16 Marquette	W 86–84	19–12 (9–9)	25 – Akinjo	7 – Mourning	5 – Akinjo	Fiserv Forum (17,514); Milwaukee, WI
Big East tournament
March 14, 2019; 9:40 pm, FS1	(6)	vs. (3) Seton Hall; Quarterfinals	L 57–73	19–13	15 – Akinjo	7 – Govan	3 – Akinjo	Madison Square Garden (19,812); New York, NY
National Invitation Tournament
March 20, 2019*; 7:00 pm, ESPN2	(3)	(6) Harvard; First round – UNC Greensboro bracket	L 68–71	19–14	25 – Govan	7 – LeBlanc	4 – Akinjo/McClung	McDonough Arena (2,253); Washington, DC
*Non-conference game. ^{#}Rankings from AP Poll. (#) Tournament seedings in parentheses. All times are in Eastern Time.

== Awards and honors ==
=== Big East Conference honors ===
Preseason honors
Honors	Player	Position	Date awarded	Ref.
Preseason All-Big East First Team	Jessie Govan	C	October 25, 2018	

Weekly honors
Honors	Player	Position	Date awarded	Ref.
Big East Men's Basketball Freshman of the Week	James Akinjo	G	November 19, 2018	
Big East Men's Basketball Freshman of the Week	Mac McClung	G	December 23, 2018	
Big East Men's Basketball Freshman of the Week	Josh LeBlanc	F	December 31, 2018	
Big East Men's Basketball Freshman of the Week	James Akinjo (2)	G	January 14, 2019	
Big East Men's Basketball Freshman of the Week	James Akinjo (3)	G	February 4, 2019	
Big East Men's Basketball Freshman of the Week	Mac McClung (2)	G	February 11, 2019	
Big East Men's Basketball Freshman of the Week	Josh LeBlanc (2)	F	March 4, 2019	
Big East Men's Basketball Freshman of the Week	James Akinjo (4)	G	March 10, 2019	

Postseason honors
Honors	Player	Position	Date awarded	Ref.
All-Big East First Team	Jessie Govan	C	March 10, 2019	
Big East All-Freshman Team	James Akinjo	G	March 10, 2019	
Big East All-Freshman Team	Josh LeBlanc	F	March 10, 2019	
Big East All-Freshman Team	Mac McClung	G	March 10, 2019	
Big East Freshman of the Year	James Akinjo	G	March 13, 2019	
