= James Akinjo =

American basketball player (born 2000)

- Akinjo with Andorra in 2026

No. 11 – BC Andorra
- Position: Point guard
- League: Liga ACB

Personal information
- Born: November 27, 2000 (age 25) Oakland, California, U.S.
- Listed height: 6 ft 1 in (1.85 m)
- Listed weight: 190 lb (86 kg)

Career information
- High school: Salesian College Prep (Richmond, California)
- College: Georgetown (2018–2019); Arizona (2020–2021); Baylor (2021–2022)
- NBA draft: 2022: undrafted
- Playing career: 2022–present

Career history
- 2022–2023: Westchester Knicks
- 2023–2024: Stockton Kings
- 2024–2025: Wisconsin Herd
- 2025–2026: Grand Rapids Gold
- 2026: Ironi Ness Ziona
- 2026–present: BC Andorra

Career highlights
- NBA G League Next Up Game MVP (2026); Third-team All-American – AP, USBWA, NABC, SN (2022); First-team All-Big 12 (2022); First-team All-Pac-12 (2021); Big East Freshman of the Year (2019); Big East All-Freshman Team (2019)
- Stats at NBA.com
- Stats at Basketball Reference

James Olusiji Akinjo Jr. (born November 27, 2000) is an American professional basketball player for BC Andorra of the Liga ACB. He played college basketball for the Georgetown Hoyas, the Arizona Wildcats and the Baylor Bears.

== Early life ==
Akinjo grew up in the crime-ridden Las Deltas Housing projects in North Richmond, California. He was raised by his grandmother, Roberta Stevenson, because his mother, Monique Divers, died from leukemia when he was a toddler. When Akinjo was 13 years old, his brother died. Many of his friends were also murdered. His father, who is only 16 years older than him, and his uncle were imprisoned or jailed during his childhood. From a young age, Akinjo aspired to become a basketball player and drew inspiration from Chris Paul. At age 11, he was featured in the East Bay Times, who touted him as a "basketball prodigy."

== High school career ==
Akinjo played for Salesian College Preparatory in Richmond, California, where he was coached by Bill Mellis. As a freshman, he stood 5'8 but had a growth spurt. At the 2017 MLK Classic, Akinjo scored 29 points in a 45–36 win over St. John Bosco-Bellflower. As a senior, he averaged 20.7 points and 5.2 assists per game, leading his team to a 30–2 record and the CIF North Coast Section Division III title.

=== Recruiting ===
A four-star recruit, he originally committed to UConn but after the firing of head coach Kevin Ollie switched his commitment to Georgetown.

College recruiting
Name	Hometown	School	Height	Weight	Commit date
James Akinjo; PG	Oakland, CA	Salesian College Prep (CA)	6 ft 0 in (1.83 m)	160 lb (73 kg)	Apr 16, 2018
James Akinjo; PG	Recruit ratings: Rivals: 247Sports: ESPN: (81)				
Overall recruit ranking: Rivals: 71 247Sports: 90 ESPN: –
Note: In many cases, Scout, Rivals, 247Sports, On3, and ESPN may conflict in their listings of height and weight.; In these cases, the average was taken. ESPN grades are on a 100-point scale.; Sources: "Georgetown 2018 Basketball Commitments". Rivals.; "2018 Georgetown Hoyas Recruiting Class". ESPN.; "2018 Team Ranking". Rivals.

== College career ==
On November 19, 2018, Akinjo earned his first Big East Conference Freshman of the Week honors after averaging 14.3 points and 4.7 assists per game in three games. He made a three-pointer with 4.9 seconds left in regulation to force overtime in a 76–73 win over South Florida. On December 22, Akinjo scored a season-high 25 points in a 102–94 victory over Arkansas–Little Rock. He matched his career-high on March 9, 2019, scoring 25 points with five three-pointers in an 86–84 win over 16th-ranked Marquette. At the end of the regular season, Akinjo was named Big East Freshman of the Year and was a unanimous pick for the Big East All-Freshman Team. As a freshman, he averaged 13.4 points, 5.2 assists, 2.9 rebounds and 1.1 steals per game.

Akinjo made his sophomore debut on November 6, 2019, scoring 20 points, including 17 in the second half, in an 81–68 win over Mount St. Mary's. On December 2, it was announced that Akinjo had left Georgetown and was entering the transfer portal along with several other Georgetown players. In seven games, he averaged 13.4 points, 4.4 assists and three rebounds per game. On January 1, 2020, Akinjo committed to Arizona. He was granted a waiver for immediate eligibility on September 1. As a junior, he averaged 15.6 points and 5.4 assists per game, earning First Team All-Pac-12 honors. On March 31, 2021, Akinjo declared for the 2021 NBA draft with the possibility of returning to school. He transferred to Baylor.

On December 28, 2021, Akinjo scored a career-high 27 points and had nine assists in a 104–68 win against Northwestern State. He missed a game against West Virginia on January 18, 2022, due to an injured tailbone. Akinjo was named to the First Team All-Big 12.

== Professional career ==
=== Westchester Knicks (2022–2023) ===
After going undrafted in the 2022 NBA draft, Akinjo was signed by the Atlanta Hawks for the 2022 NBA Summer League. On October 14, 2022, Akinjo signed with the New York Knicks, but was waived the next day. On October 23, he joined the Westchester Knicks training camp roster.

=== Stockton Kings (2023–2024) ===
On September 14, 2023, Akinjo's rights were traded to the Stockton Kings and on September 29, he signed with the Sacramento Kings. However, he was waived the same day. On November 9, he was named to the opening night roster for Stockton Kings.

=== Wisconsin Herd (2024–2025) ===
On February 6, 2024, Akinjo was traded to the Wisconsin Herd. On August 27, 2024, Akinjo signed with the Milwaukee Bucks, but was waived on October 21. On October 28, he re-joined the Herd.

On August 26, 2025, Akinjo was traded to the Grand Rapids Gold in exchange for the returning player rights to Will Richardson and a 2026 first-round pick.

On October 14, 2025, Akinjo was signed by the Denver Nuggets to an Exhibit 10 contract. On October 16, he was waived.

On July 21, 2026, Akinjo signed with MoraBanc Andorra of the Liga ACB.

== Career statistics ==
Legend
GP	Games played	GS	Games started	MPG	Minutes per game
FG%	Field goal percentage	3P%	3-point field goal percentage	FT%	Free throw percentage
RPG	Rebounds per game	APG	Assists per game	SPG	Steals per game
BPG	Blocks per game	PPG	Points per game	**Bold**	Career high

=== College ===
Year	Team	GP	GS	MPG	FG%	3P%	FT%	RPG	APG	SPG	BPG	PPG
2018–19	Georgetown	**33**	**32**	31.6	.365	.391	.812	2.9	5.2	1.1	.0	13.4
2019–20	Georgetown	7	7	30.7	.337	.242	.813	**3.0**	4.4	**2.0**	.0	13.4
2020–21	Arizona	26	26	**34.9**	.379	**.408**	.819	2.3	5.4	1.4	.0	**15.6**
2021–22	Baylor	32	**32**	33.1	**.383**	.295	**.835**	2.8	**5.8**	**2.0**	.0	13.5
Career		98	97	32.9	.373	.354	.820	2.7	5.4	1.6	.0	14.0

== Personal life ==
Akinjo's father played basketball for McClymonds High School in Oakland, California in the late 1990s.
