= 2019 Big East men's basketball tournament =

- Classification: Division I
- Season: 2018–19
- Teams: 10
- Site: Madison Square Garden; New York City
- Champions: Villanova (5th title)
- Winning coach: Jay Wright (4th title)
- MVP: Phil Booth (Villanova)
- Television: FS1, FOX

2018–19 Big East men's basketball standings
	Conf.				Overall
Team	W		L	PCT	W		L	PCT
No. 23 Villanova †	13	–	5	.722	26	–	10	.722
Marquette	12	–	6	.667	24	–	10	.706
Seton Hall	9	–	9	.500	20	–	14	.588
Xavier	9	–	9	.500	19	–	16	.543
Creighton	9	–	9	.500	20	–	15	.571
Georgetown	9	–	9	.500	19	–	14	.576
St. John's	8	–	10	.444	21	–	13	.618
Providence	7	–	11	.389	18	–	16	.529
Butler	7	–	11	.389	16	–	17	.485
DePaul	7	–	11	.389	19	–	17	.528
† 2019 Big East tournament winner Rankings from AP Poll

The 2019 Big East men's basketball tournament was the men's basketball postseason tournament for the Big East Conference. It was held from March 13 through March 16, 2019 at Madison Square Garden in New York City. Villanova defeated Seton Hall 74–72 to win the tournament, and the conference's automatic bid to the NCAA tournament. With the win, Villanova became the first team to win the Big East tournament three consecutive times.

== Seeds ==
All 10 Big East schools participated in the tournament. Teams were seeded based on their conference records, with tie-breaking procedures used to determine the seeds for teams with identical records. The top six teams received first-round byes. Tournament seeding was finalized at the close of the regular conference season.

Seed	School	Conference	Tiebreaker 1	Tiebreaker 2	Tiebreaker 3
1	Villanova	13–5			
2	Marquette	12–6			
3	Seton Hall	9–9	4–2 vs. Xavier/Creighton/Georgetown		
4	Xavier	9–9	3–3 vs. Seton Hall/Creighton/Georgetown	1–1 vs. Creighton	1–1 vs. Villanova
5	Creighton	9–9	3–3 vs. Xavier/Seton Hall/Georgetown	1–1 vs. Xavier	0–2 vs. Villanova
6	Georgetown	9–9	2–4 vs. Seton Hall/Xavier/Creighton		
7	St. John's	8–10			
8	Providence	7–11	3–1 vs. DePaul/Butler		
9	Butler	7–11	2–2 vs. Providence/DePaul		
10	DePaul	7–11	1–3 vs. Butler/Providence		

== Schedule ==
Game	Time	Matchup	Score	Television	Attendance
First round – Wednesday, March 13
1	7:00 pm	No. 8 Providence vs. No. 9 Butler	80–57	FS1	19,812
2	9:30 pm	No. 7 St. John's vs. No. 10 DePaul	82–74	FS1	19,812
Quarterfinals – Thursday, March 14
3	12:00 pm	No. 1 Villanova vs. No. 8 Providence	73–62	FS1	19,534
4	2:30 pm	No. 4 Xavier vs. No. 5 Creighton	63–61	FS1	19,534
5	7:00 pm	No. 2 Marquette vs. No. 7 St. John's	86–54	FS1	19,812
6	9:40 pm	No. 3 Seton Hall vs. No. 6 Georgetown	73–57	FS1	19,812
Semifinals – Friday, March 15
7	6:30 pm	No. 1 Villanova vs. No. 4 Xavier	71–67 (OT)	FS1	19,812
8	9:00 pm	No. 2 Marquette vs. No. 3 Seton Hall	79–81	FS1	19,812
Championship – Saturday, March 16
9	6:30 pm	No. 1 Villanova vs. No. 3 Seton Hall	74–72	Fox	19,812
Game times in Eastern Time. Rankings denote tournament seed.

== Bracket ==
First round Wednesday, March 13; FS1
8	Providence	80
9	Butler	57
7	St. John's	82
10	DePaul	74

Quarterfinals; Thursday, March 14; FS1
1	#25 Villanova	73
8	Providence	62
4	Xavier	63
5	Creighton	61
2	#23 Marquette	86
7	St. John's	54
3	Seton Hall	73
6	Georgetown	57

Semifinals; Friday, March 15; FS1
1	#25 Villanova	71*
4	Xavier	67
2	#23 Marquette	79
3	Seton Hall	81

Championship; Saturday, March 16; FOX
1	#25 Villanova	74
3	Seton Hall	72

*Indicates number of overtime periods.

== See also ==
- 2019 Big East women's basketball tournament
