= 2018–19 Xavier Musketeers men's basketball team =

American college basketball season

2018–19 Xavier Musketeers men's basketball

NIT, Second Round
- Conference: Big East Conference
- Record: 19–16 (9–9 Big East)
- Head coach: Travis Steele (1st season)
- Assistant coaches: Jonas Hayes (1st season); Ben Johnson (1st season); Dante Jackson (1st season)
- Home arena: Cintas Center

2018–19 Big East men's basketball standings
	Conf.				Overall
Team	W		L	PCT	W		L	PCT
No. 23 Villanova †	13	–	5	.722	26	–	10	.722
Marquette	12	–	6	.667	24	–	10	.706
Seton Hall	9	–	9	.500	20	–	14	.588
Xavier	9	–	9	.500	19	–	16	.543
Creighton	9	–	9	.500	20	–	15	.571
Georgetown	9	–	9	.500	19	–	14	.576
St. John's	8	–	10	.444	21	–	13	.618
Providence	7	–	11	.389	18	–	16	.529
Butler	7	–	11	.389	16	–	17	.485
DePaul	7	–	11	.389	19	–	17	.528
† 2019 Big East tournament winner Rankings from AP Poll

The 2018–19 Xavier Musketeers men's basketball team represented Xavier University during the 2018–19 NCAA Division I men's basketball season as a member of the Big East Conference. Led by first-year head coach Travis Steele, they played their home games at the Cintas Center in Cincinnati, Ohio. Xavier finished the season 19–16, 9–9 in Big East play to finish in third place. In the Big East tournament, Xavier beat Creighton in the quarterfinals before losing to Villanova in the semifinals. The Musketeers failed to receive a bid to the NCAA tournament, but received an at-large bid to the National Invitation Tournament. There they defeated Toledo in the first round before losing in overtime to Texas in the second round.

== Previous season ==
The Musketeers finished the 2017–18 season 29–6, 15–3 in Big East play to win the Big East championship. In the Big East tournament, they defeated St. John's before losing to Providence in the semifinals. They received an at-large bid to the NCAA tournament as a No. 1 seed in the West region. In the First Round, they defeated Texas Southern before being upset by Florida State in the Second Round.

On March 27, 2018, Chris Mack was hired as the new head coach of Louisville, leaving Xavier after nine seasons. Four days later, longtime assistant coach Travis Steele was named the new head coach of the Musketeers.

== Offseason ==
=== Departures ===
Name	Number	Pos.	Height	Weight	Year	Hometown	Reason left
Trevon Bluiett	5	Guard	6'6"	198	Senior	Indianapolis, IN	Graduated
Kerem Kanter	11	Forward	6'10"	240	Graduate student	Istanbul, Turkey	Completed athletic eligibility; graduated from Green Bay in 2017
Matt Singleton	20	Forward	6'7"	215	Senior	Garrett, IN	Graduated
Kaiser Gates	22	Forward	6'7"	205	Junior	Alpharetta, GA	Declared for the 2018 NBA draft
Sean O'Mara	54	Forward-center	6'10"	244	Senior	Glen Ellyn, IL	Graduated
J. P. Macura	55	Guard	6'5"	203	Senior	Lakeville, MN	Graduated

=== Incoming transfers ===
Name	Number	Pos.	Height	Weight	Year	Hometown	Previous School
Kyle Castlin	2	Guard	6'4"	190	Graduate Student	Marietta, Georgia	Transferred from Columbia after graduating. Will have one year of eligibility beginning immediately.
Zach Hankins	35	Center	6'10"	245	Graduate Student	Charlevoix, Michigan	Transferred from Ferris State after graduating. Will have one year of eligibility beginning immediately.
Ryan Welage	32	Forward	6'9"	205	Graduate Student	Greensburg, Indiana	Transferred from San Jose State after graduating. Will have one year of eligibility beginning immediately.
Myles Hanson	34	Guard	6'7"	215	Sophomore	Chaska, Minnesota	Transferred from Columbia. Under NCAA transfer rules, Hanson will have to sit out for the 2018–19 season. Will have three years of remaining eligibility. Will join team as a walk-on.

=== Recruiting classes ===
==== 2018 recruiting class ====
College recruiting information
Name	Hometown	School	Height	Weight	Commit date
Keonte Kennedy; SG	Austin, TX	Westlake High School	6 ft 4 in (1.93 m)	175 lb (79 kg)	Oct 3, 2017
Keonte Kennedy; SG	Recruit ratings: Scout: Rivals: 247Sports: ESPN:				
Dontarius James; SF	Kershaw, SC	Andrew Jackson High School	6 ft 7 in (2.01 m)	215 lb (98 kg)	Nov 12, 2017
Dontarius James; SF	Recruit ratings: Scout: Rivals: 247Sports:				
Overall recruit ranking:
Note: In many cases, Scout, Rivals, 247Sports, On3, and ESPN may conflict in their listings of height and weight.; In these cases, the average was taken. ESPN grades are on a 100-point scale.; Sources: "2018 Xavier Commits". Rivals.; "2018 Team Ranking". Rivals.

== Honors and awards ==
Street & Smith's Preseason Awards

- All-Newcomer - Ryan Welage
- All-Sharpshooter - Ryan Welage

== Roster ==
2018–19 Xavier Musketeers men's basketball team
Players
Coaches

Pos.	#	Name	Height	Weight	Year	Previous school	Hometown
F	0	Tyrique Jones	6 ft 9 in (2.06 m)	235 lb (107 kg)	Jr	Vermont Academy	Bloomfield, Connecticut
G	1	Paul Scruggs	6 ft 3 in (1.91 m)	200 lb (91 kg)	So	Prolific Prep	Indianapolis, Indiana
G	2	Kyle Castlin	6 ft 4 in (1.93 m)	193 lb (88 kg)	GS	Columbia	Marietta, Georgia
G	3	Quentin Goodin	6 ft 4 in (1.93 m)	194 lb (88 kg)	Jr	Taylor County HS	Campbellsville, Kentucky
G	4	Elias Harden	6 ft 5 in (1.96 m)	187 lb (85 kg)	So	Pebblebrook HS	East Point, Georgia
G	10	Leighton Schrand	6 ft 0 in (1.83 m)	155 lb (70 kg)	Jr	Holy Cross HS	Villa Hills, Kentucky
G	11	Keonte Kennedy	6 ft 5 in (1.96 m)	187 lb (85 kg)	Fr	Westlake HS	Aurora, Colorado
F	12	Dontarius James	6 ft 7 in (2.01 m)	210 lb (95 kg)	Fr	Huntington Prep	Kershaw, South Carolina
F	13	Naji Marshall	6 ft 7 in (2.01 m)	222 lb (101 kg)	So	Hargrave Military Academy	Atlantic City, New Jersey
G	20	Ramon Singh	6 ft 4 in (1.93 m)	170 lb (77 kg)	Fr	La Lumiere School	Sydney, Australia
F	32	Ryan Welage	6 ft 10 in (2.08 m)	205 lb (93 kg)	GS	San Jose State	Greensburg, Indiana
G/F	34	Myles Hanson (W) (redshirt)	6 ft 7 in (2.01 m)	215 lb (98 kg)	So	Columbia	Chaska, Minnesota
F	35	Zach Hankins	6 ft 11 in (2.11 m)	245 lb (111 kg)	GS	Ferris State	Charlevoix, Michigan

Head coach

- Travis Steele (Butler)

Assistant coach(es)

- Jonas Hayes (Georgia)
- Ben Johnson (Minnesota)
- Dante Jackson (Xavier)

Legend

- (C) Team captain
- (S) Suspended
- (I) Ineligible
- (W) Walk-on
- Injured
- Current redshirt

Roster

== Schedule and results ==
Date time, TV	Rank^{#}	Opponent^{#}	Result	Record	High points	High rebounds	High assists	Site (attendance) city, state
Exhibition
November 1, 2018*; 7:00 pm		Kentucky Wesleyan	W 98–69	–	22 – Tied	7 – Tied	5 – Welage	Cintas Center (10,073); Cincinnati, OH
Non-conference regular season
November 6, 2018*; 8:30 pm, FS2		IUPUI	W 82–69	1–0	24 – Welage	8 – Castlin	7 – Marshall	Cintas Center (10,224); Cincinnati, OH
November 10, 2018*; 4:00 pm, FSN		Evansville; Maui on the Mainland	W 91–85	2–0	24 – Scruggs	20 – Jones	5 – Scruggs	Cintas Center (10,533); Cincinnati, OH
November 13, 2018*; 6:30 pm, FS1		Wisconsin; Gavitt Tipoff Games	L 68–77	2–1	24 – Marshall	13 – Marshall	5 – Goodin	Cintas Center (10,312); Cincinnati, OH
November 19, 2018*; 2:30 pm, ESPN2		vs. No. 8 Auburn; Maui Invitational tournament quarterfinals	L 79–88 ^{OT}	2–2	17 – Welage	9 – Jones	6 – Goodin	Lahaina Civic Center (2,400); Lahaina, HI
November 20, 2018*; 2:30 pm, ESPN2		vs. San Diego State; Maui Invitational Tournament consolation 2nd round	L 74–79	2–3	20 – Goodin	6 – Scruggs	5 – Marshall	Lahaina Civic Center (2,400); Lahaina, HI
November 21, 2018*; 9:00 pm, ESPNU		vs. Illinois; Maui Invitational Tournament 7th place game	W 83–74	3–3	15 – Goodin	9 – Jones	5 – Marshall	Lahaina Civic Center (2,400); Lahaina, HI
November 28, 2018*; 6:30 pm, FS1		Miami (OH)	W 82–55	4–3	17 – Marshall	13 – Jones	8 – Goodin	Cintas Center (10,394); Cincinnati, OH
December 1, 2018*; 12:00 pm, FS1		Oakland	W 73–63	5–3	14 – Marshall	11 – Jones	4 – Scruggs	Cintas Center (10,331); Cincinnati, OH
December 5, 2018*; 6:30 pm, FS1		Ohio	W 82–61	6–3	21 – Scruggs	7 – Marshall	8 – Scruggs	Cintas Center (10,405); Cincinnati, OH
December 8, 2018*; 2:00 pm, ESPN2		at Cincinnati; Crosstown Shootout	L 47–62	6–4	12 – Goodin	7 – Tied	5 – Goodin	Fifth Third Arena (12,513); Cincinnati, OH
December 15, 2018*; 8:00 pm, FS1		Eastern Kentucky	W 95–77	7–4	16 – Goodin	10 – Marshall	10 – Goodin	Cintas Center (10,112); Cincinnati, OH
December 18, 2018*; 7:00 pm, ESPNU		at Missouri	L 56–71	7–5	21 – Goodin	11 – Marshall	6 – Goodin	Mizzou Arena (9,785); Columbia, MO
December 21, 2018*; 7:00 pm, FS2		Detroit Mercy	W 69–55	8–5	22 – Goodin	11 – Hankins	9 – Goodin	Cintas Center (10,224); Cincinnati, OH
Big East regular season
December 29, 2018; 2:00 pm, FS1		at DePaul	W 74–65	9–5 (1–0)	19 – Marshall	14 – Marshall	8 – Goodin	Wintrust Arena (5,632); Chicago, IL
January 2, 2019; 6:30 pm, FS1		Seton Hall	L 70–80	9–6 (1–1)	22 – Scruggs	7 – Marshall	6 – Goodin	Cintas Center (10,224); Cincinnati, OH
January 6, 2019; 12:00 pm, FOX		at No. 16 Marquette	L 52–70	9–7 (1–2)	21 – Marshall	10 – Scruggs	2 – Goodin	Fiserv Forum (17,309); Milwaukee, WI
January 9, 2019; 6:30 pm, FS1		Georgetown	W 81–75	10–7 (2–2)	23 – Hankins	10 – Tied	4 – Scruggs	Cintas Center (10,224); Cincinnati, OH
January 13, 2019; 12:00 pm, CBSSN		Butler	W 70–69	11–7 (3–2)	23 – Scruggs	8 – Scruggs	6 – Scruggs	Cintas Center (10,144); Cincinnati, OH
January 18, 2019; 8:30 pm, FS1		at No. 22 Villanova	L 75–85	11–8 (3–3)	21 – Jones	12 – Jones	7 – Marshall	Wells Fargo Center (12,103); Philadelphia, PA
January 23, 2019; 6:30 pm, FS1		Providence	L 62–64	11–9 (3–4)	14 – Scruggs	10 – Castlin	4 – Tied	Cintas Center (10,142); Cincinnati, OH
January 26, 2019; 2:00 pm, FS1		No. 12 Marquette	L 82–87	11–10 (3–5)	21 – Tied	11 – Jones	5 – Scruggs	Cintas Center (10,547); Cincinnati, OH
January 31, 2019; 8:00 pm, CBSSN		at Georgetown	L 73–80	11–11 (3–6)	16 – Marshall	7 – Scruggs	4 – Goodin	Capital One Arena (7,636); Washington, DC
February 3, 2019; 1:00 pm, FSN		at Creighton	L 54–76	11–12 (3–7)	13 – Goodin	5 – Scruggs	7 – Goodin	CHI Health Center Omaha (16,678); Omaha, NE
February 9, 2019; 8:00 pm, FS1		DePaul	L 62–74	11–13 (3–8)	22 – Marshall	9 – Jones	4 – Marshall	Cintas Center (10,242); Cincinnati, OH
February 13, 2019; 8:30 pm, CBSSN		Creighton	W 64–61 ^{OT}	12–13 (4–8)	23 – Marshall	8 – Scruggs	5 – Marshall	Cintas Center (9,949); Cincinnati, OH
February 16, 2019; 2:00 pm, FOX		at Providence	W 75–61	13–13 (5–8)	19 – Jones	12 – Jones	7 – Goodin	Dunkin' Donuts Center (12,410); Providence, RI
February 20, 2019; 7:00 pm, CBSSN		at Seton Hall	W 70–69	14–13 (6–8)	28 – Marshall	15 – Jones	5 – Marshall	Prudential Center (7,916); Newark, NJ
February 24, 2019; 1:30 pm, CBS		No. 17 Villanova	W 66–54	15–13 (7–8)	17 – Marshall	8 – Jones	4 – Tied	Cintas Center (10,444); Cincinnati, OH
February 28, 2019; 6:30 pm, FS1		at St. John's	W 84–73	16–13 (8–8)	31 – Marshall	10 – Jones	4 – Jones	Carnesecca Arena (5,602); Queens, NY
March 5, 2019; 6:00 pm, FS1		at Butler	L 66–71	16–14 (8–9)	13 – Tied	9 – Hankins	4 – Goodin	Hinkle Fieldhouse; Indianapolis, IN
March 9, 2019; 5:00 pm, FOX		St. John's	W 81–68	17–14 (9–9)	22 – Scruggs	7 – Tied	7 – Goodin	Cintas Center (10,391); Cincinnati, OH
Big East tournament
March 14, 2019; 2:30 pm, FS1	(4)	vs. (5) Creighton; Quarterfinals	W 63–61	18–14	22 – Hankins	9 – Hankins	4 – Goodin	Madison Square Garden (19,534); New York, NY
March 15, 2019; 6:30 pm, FS1	(4)	vs. (1) No. 25 Villanova; Semifinals	L 67–71 ^{OT}	18–15	28 – Scruggs	11 – Scruggs	8 – Goodin	Madison Square Garden; New York, NY
NIT
March 20, 2019*; 7:00 pm, ESPN3	(3)	(6) Toledo; First Round – Alabama Bracket	W 78–64	19–15	20 – Marshall	21 – Marshall	6 – Marshall	Cintas Center (5,769); Cincinnati, OH
March 24, 2019*; 4:00 pm, ESPN	(3)	at (2) Texas; Second Round – Alabama Bracket	L 76–78 ^{OT}	19–16	22 – Jones	11 – Jones	5 – Goodin	Frank Erwin Center (3,204); Austin, TX
*Non-conference game. ^{#}Rankings from AP Poll. (#) Tournament seedings in parentheses. All times are in Eastern Time.

== Rankings ==
Ranking movements Legend: — = Not ranked RV = Received votes
	Week																			
Poll	Pre	1	2	3	4	5	6	7	8	9	10	11	12	13	14	15	16	17	18	Final
AP	RV																			Not released
Coaches	—																			

*AP does not release post-NCAA Tournament rankings
