= 2017–18 Saint Peter's Peacocks men's basketball team =

American college basketball season

2017–18 Saint Peter's Peacocks men's basketball
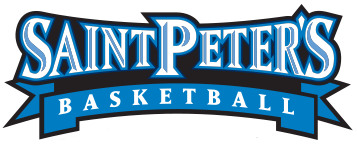
- Conference: Metro Atlantic Athletic Conference
- Record: 14–18 (6–12 MAAC)
- Head coach: John Dunne (12th season)
- Assistant coaches: Matt Henry; Serge Clement; David Danzig
- Home arena: Yanitelli Center

2017–18 MAAC men's basketball standings
	Conf.				Overall
Team	W		L	PCT	W		L	PCT
Rider	15	–	3	.833	22	–	10	.688
Canisius	15	–	3	.833	21	–	12	.636
Niagara	12	–	6	.667	19	–	14	.576
Iona †	11	–	7	.611	20	–	14	.588
Manhattan	9	–	9	.500	14	–	17	.452
Fairfield	9	–	9	.500	17	–	16	.515
Quinnipiac	7	–	11	.389	12	–	21	.364
Monmouth	7	–	11	.389	11	–	20	.355
Saint Peter's	6	–	12	.333	14	–	18	.438
Siena	4	–	14	.222	8	–	24	.250
Marist	4	–	14	.222	6	–	25	.194
† 2018 MAAC tournament winner

The 2017–18 Saint Peter's Peacocks basketball team represented Saint Peter's University during the 2017–18 NCAA Division I men's basketball season. The Peacocks, led by 12th-year head coach John Dunne, played their home games at the Yanitelli Center in Jersey City, New Jersey as members of the Metro Atlantic Athletic Conference (MAAC). They finished the season 14–18 overall, 6–12 in MAAC play, to finish in ninth place. As the No. 9 seed at the MAAC tournament, they defeated No. 8 seed Monmouth and upset No. 1 seed Rider to advance to the semifinals, where they lost to No. 4 seed Iona.

After the end of the season, head coach John Dunne left Saint Peter's to take the same position at Marist College. On April 10, 2018, Seton Hall assistant coach Shaheen Holloway was hired as his replacement.

== Previous season ==
The Peacocks finished the 2016–17 season 23–13, 14–6 in MAAC play, to finish in second place. They defeated Canisius in the MAAC tournament before losing in the semifinals to Iona. They were invited to the CollegeInsider.com Tournament where they defeated Albany, Texas State and Furman to advance to the CIT championship. There they defeated Texas A&M–Corpus Christi 62–61 to become CIT champions.

== Roster ==
2017–18 Saint Peter's Peacocks men's basketball team
Players
Coaches

Pos.	#	Name	Height	Weight	Year	Previous school	Hometown
G	0	Nick Griffin	6 ft 2 in (1.88 m)	173 lb (78 kg)	GS	George Washington; Colonel Zadok A. Magruder	Rockville, MD
G	1	Davauhnte Turner	6 ft 0 in (1.83 m)	175 lb (79 kg)	RS Jr	Independence CC; Lincoln Prep	Simsboro, LA
G	3	Elijah Gonzales	5 ft 9 in (1.75 m)	155 lb (70 kg)	Fr	Clackamas	Portland, OR
G/F	5	Manny Dixon	6 ft 5 in (1.96 m)	175 lb (79 kg)	Fr	Notre Dame (NJ)	Lawrenceville, NJ
G	10	Mikko Johnson	6 ft 2 in (1.88 m)	165 lb (75 kg)	Fr	Brooklyn HS for Law and Technology	Brooklyn, NY
G/F	11	Nnamdi Enechionyia	6 ft 6 in (1.98 m)	190 lb (86 kg)	GS	Samford; St. James School (MD)	Springfield, VA
G	12	Jeremiah Livingston	6 ft 1 in (1.85 m)	165 lb (75 kg)	Jr	Odessa College; Westhill (CT)	Stamford, CT
G	14	Amir Hicks	5 ft 10 in (1.78 m)	155 lb (70 kg)	So	St. Mary (Rutherford, NJ)	Paterson, NJ
F	15	Mamadou Ndiaye	6 ft 7 in (2.01 m)	210 lb (95 kg)	Jr	Oakland Mills	Laurel, MD
F	21	Julian Powell	6 ft 9 in (2.06 m)	209 lb (95 kg)	Jr	Lee College; Goose Creek Memorial	Baytown, TX
F	23	Samuel Idowu	6 ft 7 in (2.01 m)	240 lb (109 kg)	Jr	Lafayette Educational Complex	Brooklyn, NY
G/F	24	Quinn Taylor	6 ft 4 in (1.93 m)	185 lb (84 kg)	So	Tascosa	Amarillo, TX
G	25	Cameron Jones	6 ft 3 in (1.91 m)	210 lb (95 kg)	RS So	Pennsbury	Fairless Hills, PA

Head coach

- John Dunne (Ithaca)

Assistant coach(es)

- Matt Henry (Trinity (FL))
- Serge Clement (Potsdam State)
- Dalip Bhatia (Rutgers)

Legend

- (C) Team captain
- (S) Suspended
- (I) Ineligible
- (W) Walk-on
- Injured
- Current redshirt

Roster
Last update: February 18, 2025

== Schedule and results ==
Date time, TV	Rank^{#}	Opponent^{#}	Result	Record	High points	High rebounds	High assists	Site (attendance) city, state
Non-conference regular season
November 11, 2017*; 3:00 p.m.		at La Salle; Hall of Fame Tip-Off	L 40–61	0–1	9 – Jones	6 – Idowu	4 – Turner	Tom Gola Arena (2,822); Philadelphia, PA
November 11, 2017*; 8:00 p.m., BTN+		at No. 20 Northwestern; Hall of Fame Tip-Off	L 66–75	0–2	19 – Griffin	3 – tied	5 – Turner	Allstate Arena (5,101); Rosemont, IL
November 13, 2017*; 7:30 p.m., ESPN3		vs. Sacred Heart; Hall of Fame Tip Off Springfield Bracket semifinal	W 70–61	1–2	23 – Griffin	4 – tied	3 – Griffin	Mohegan Sun Arena; Uncasville, CT
November 18, 2017*; 8:00 p.m., ESPN3		vs. South Alabama; Hall of Fame Tip Off Springfield Bracket championship	L 49–54	1–3	10 – Idowu	8 – Turner	3 – Turner	Mohegan Sun Arena; Uncasville, CT
November 26, 2017*; 2:00 p.m.		at Lafayette	W 86–82	2–3	37 – Griffin	14 – Taylor	4 – Gonzales	Kirby Sports Center (1,745); Easton, PA
November 29, 2017*; 7:00 p.m.		Fairleigh Dickinson	W 77–53	3–3	19 – Griffin	10 – Taylor	5 – Griffin	Yanitelli Center; Jersey City, NJ
December 2, 2017*; 7:00 p.m.		at Elon	L 65–71 ^{OT}	3–4	17 – Taylor	12 – Taylor	2 – Enechionyia	Alumni Gym (1,386); Elon, NC
December 6, 2017*; 7:00 p.m.		Houston Baptist	W 76–74	4–4	20 – Griffin	6 – Idowu	6 – Turner	Yanitelli Center (605); Jersey City, NJ
December 12, 2017*; 7:00 p.m., FS1		at No. 15 Seton Hall	L 61–84	4–5	13 – Turner	7 – Taylor	3 – Gonzales	Walsh Gymnasium (1,655); South Orange, NJ
December 17, 2017*; 12:00 p.m.		vs. LIU Brooklyn	W 71–56	5–5	19 – Turner	11 – Ndiaye	4 – Jones	Barclays Center (987); Brooklyn, NY
December 23, 2017*; 2:00 p.m.		St. Francis Brooklyn	W 71–68 ^{OT}	6–5	20 – Idowu	8 – Idowu	3 – Gonzales	Yanitelli Center (501); Jersey City, NJ
MAAC regular season
December 28, 2017; 7:00 p.m.		at Fairfield	L 61–70	6–6 (0–1)	16 – Gonzales	6 – Turner	3 – tied	Webster Bank Arena (1,112); Bridgeport, CT
December 31, 2017; 12:00 p.m.		Monmouth	W 77–64	7–6 (1–1)	17 – Griffin	7 – Taylor	5 – Gonzales	Yanitelli Center (580); Jersey City, NJ
January 5, 2018; 7:00 p.m., ESPNU		at Iona	L 69–73	7–7 (1–2)	20 – Idowu	6 – tied	3 – tied	Hynes Athletic Center (1,376); New Rochelle, NY
January 7, 2018; 2:00 p.m.		Quinnipiac	W 84–58	8–7 (2–2)	15 – tied	5 – tied	9 – Gonzales	Yanitelli Center (602); Jersey City, NJ
January 12, 2018; 7:00 p.m., ESPN3		at Canisius	L 58–70	8–8 (2–3)	12 – Turner	7 – Idowu	4 – Gonzales	Koessler Athletic Center (764); Buffalo, NY
January 14, 2018; 2:00 p.m.		at Niagara	L 70–73	8–9 (2–4)	22 – Turner	7 – Idowu	4 – Gonzales	Gallagher Center (1,177); Lewiston, NY
January 18, 2018; 7:30 p.m.		Rider	L 84–88	8–10 (2–5)	34 – Turner	9 – Taylor	8 – Enechionyia	Yanitelli Center (555); Jersey City, NJ
January 21, 2018; 12:00 p.m.		Manhattan	L 57–68	8–11 (2–6)	17 – Idowu	10 – Idowu	3 – Taylor	Yanitelli Center (726); Jersey City, NJ
January 26, 2018; 7:00 p.m., ESPNU		at Rider	L 60–63	8–12 (2–7)	16 – Idowu	5 – tied	5 – Taylor	Alumni Gymnasium (1,650); Lawrenceville, NJ
January 29, 2018; 7:00 p.m., ESPN3		at Siena	L 57–59 ^{3OT}	8–13 (2–8)	17 – Idowu	13 – Idowu	3 – Gonzales	Times Union Center (5,065); Albany, NY
February 2, 2018; 7:00 p.m.		Niagara	W 58–52	9–13 (3–8)	20 – Griffin	7 – Idowu	3 – Taylor	Yanitelli Center (543); Jersey City, NJ
February 4, 2018; 2:00 p.m.		Canisius	L 58–73	9–14 (3–9)	11 – Ndiaye	7 – tied	2 – tied	Yanitelli Center (454); Jersey City, NJ
February 8, 2018; 7:00 p.m.		Marist	W 70–66	10–14 (4–9)	30 – Turner	5 – Ndiaye	3 – Gonzales	Yanitelli Center (908); Jersey City, NJ
February 10, 2018; 12:00 p.m.		Iona	L 77–86	10–15 (4–10)	21 – Turner	11 – Idowu	6 – Gonzales	Yanitelli Center (745); Jersey City, NJ
February 13, 2018; 7:00 p.m., ESPN3		at Monmouth	L 57–72	10–16 (4–11)	15 – Griffin	6 – Idowu	2 – tied	OceanFirst Bank Center (1,716); West Long Branch, NJ
February 17, 2018; 7:00 p.m., ESPN3		at Marist	L 51–69	10–17 (4–12)	15 – Idowu	7 – Taylor	3 – tied	McCann Field House (1,204); Poughkeepsie, NY
February 23, 2018; 7:00 p.m.		at Quinnipiac	W 52–43	11–17 (5–12)	13 – Gonzales	10 – Idowu	3 – tied	TD Bank Sports Center (2,392); Hamden, CT
February 25, 2018; 2:00 p.m.		Siena	W 65–48	12–17 (6–12)	14 – Jones	10 – Idowu	10 – Gonzales	Yanitelli Center (725); Jersey City, NJ
MAAC tournament
March 1, 2018; 5:00 p.m., ESPN3	(9)	vs. (8) Monmouth; First round	W 60–58	13–17	20 – Griffin	8 – Idowu	4 – tied	Times Union Center; Albany, NY
March 2, 2018; 7:00 p.m., ESPN3	(9)	vs. (1) Rider; Quarterfinals	W 66–55	14–17	12 – Idowu	10 – Ndiaye	4 – Gonzales	Times Union Center (2,096); Albany, NY
March 4, 2018; 7:00 p.m., ESPN3	(9)	vs. (4) Iona; Semifinals	L 62–65	14–18	19 – Taylor	11 – Idowu	3 – Turner	Times Union Center (2,151); Albany, NY
*Non-conference game. ^{#}Rankings from AP poll. (#) Tournament seedings in parentheses. All times are in Eastern.
