= 2017–18 Niagara Purple Eagles men's basketball team =

American college basketball season

2017–18 Niagara Purple Eagles men's basketball
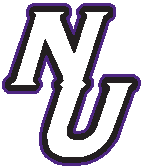

CIT, First round
- Conference: Metro Atlantic Athletic Conference
- Record: 19–14 (12–6 MAAC)
- Head coach: Chris Casey (5th season)
- Assistant coaches: Marc Rybczyk; Will Lanier; Kareem Brown
- Home arena: Gallagher Center

2017–18 MAAC men's basketball standings
	Conf.				Overall
Team	W		L	PCT	W		L	PCT
Rider	15	–	3	.833	22	–	10	.688
Canisius	15	–	3	.833	21	–	12	.636
Niagara	12	–	6	.667	19	–	14	.576
Iona †	11	–	7	.611	20	–	14	.588
Manhattan	9	–	9	.500	14	–	17	.452
Fairfield	9	–	9	.500	17	–	16	.515
Quinnipiac	7	–	11	.389	12	–	21	.364
Monmouth	7	–	11	.389	11	–	20	.355
Saint Peter's	6	–	12	.333	14	–	18	.438
Siena	4	–	14	.222	8	–	24	.250
Marist	4	–	14	.222	6	–	25	.194
† 2018 MAAC tournament winner

The 2017–18 Niagara Purple Eagles men's basketball team represented Niagara University during the 2017–18 NCAA Division I men's basketball season. The Purple Eagles, led by fifth-year head coach Chris Casey, played their home games at the Gallagher Center in Lewiston, New York as members of the Metro Atlantic Athletic Conference. They finished the season 19–14, 12–6 in MAAC play to finish in third place. They lost in the quarterfinals of the MAAC tournament to Fairfield. They were invited to the CollegeInsider.com Tournament where they lost in the first round to Eastern Michigan.

== Previous season ==
The Purple Eagles finished the 2016–17 season 10–23, 6–14 in MAAC play to finish in ninth place. They defeated Quinnipiac in the first round of the MAAC tournament to advance to the quarterfinals where they lost to Monmouth.

== Roster ==
2017–18 Niagara Purple Eagles men's basketball team
Players
Coaches

Pos.	#	Name	Height	Weight	Year	Hometown
G	0	Chris Barton	6 ft 3 in (1.91 m)	199 lb (90 kg)	Jr	Pontiac, Michigan
G	1	Dominik Fragala	6 ft 0 in (1.83 m)	145 lb (66 kg)	Fr	Chantilly, Virginia
G	2	Kevin Larkin	6 ft 5 in (1.96 m)	172 lb (78 kg)	RS Jr	Georgetown, Delaware
G	4	Keleaf Tate	6 ft 2 in (1.88 m)	170 lb (77 kg)	RS Fr	Washington, D.C.
G	5	James Towns	5 ft 10 in (1.78 m)	171 lb (78 kg)	So	Detroit, Michigan
G	10	Kahlil Dukes	6 ft 0 in (1.83 m)	176 lb (80 kg)	RS Sr	Hartford, Connecticut
F	11	Marvin Prochet	6 ft 7 in (2.01 m)	207 lb (94 kg)	Jr	Brooklyn, New York
G	13	Matt Scott	6 ft 4 in (1.93 m)	191 lb (87 kg)	Sr	Brooklyn, New York
G	20	Sam Volmy	6 ft 3 in (1.91 m)	190 lb (86 kg)	RS Sr	Lockport, New York
F	21	Kierell Green	6 ft 7 in (2.01 m)	177 lb (80 kg)	RS Fr	Washington, D.C.
F	24	Greg King	6 ft 7 in (2.01 m)	238 lb (108 kg)	RS Jr	Atlanta, Georgia
F	30	Greg Kuakumensah	6 ft 6 in (1.98 m)	200 lb (91 kg)	Fr	Worcester, Massachusetts
F	32	Dominic Robb	6 ft 8 in (2.03 m)	226 lb (103 kg)	Jr	Pittsburgh, Pennsylvania

Head coach

- Chris Casey (Western Connecticut State)

Assistant coach(es)

- Marc Rybczyk (Central Connecticut State)
- Will Lanier (Georgia Tech)
- Kareem Brown (St. John's)

Legend

- (C) Team captain
- (S) Suspended
- (I) Ineligible
- (W) Walk-on
- Injured
- Current redshirt

Roster
Last update: November 16, 2017

== Schedule and results ==
Date time, TV	Rank^{#}	Opponent^{#}	Result	Record	Site (attendance) city, state
Exhibition
Oct 27, 2017*; 7:00 pm		Robert Morris; Hurricane relief charity game	L 70–73		Gallagher Center (605); Lewiston, NY
Nov 4, 2017*; 3:00 pm		Saint Rose; Hurricane relief charity game	W 90–69		Gallagher Center (931); Lewiston, NY
Non-conference regular season
Nov 10, 2017*; 8:00 pm		at St. Bonaventure	W 77–75	1–0	Reilly Center (4,952); St. Bonaventure, NY
Nov 15, 2017*; 7:00 pm, BTN+		at No. 14 Minnesota	L 81–107	1–1	Williams Arena (10,093); Minneapolis, MN
Nov 19, 2017*; 12:00 pm		at Massachusetts; Barclays Center Classic	L 76–101	1–2	Mullins Center (2,112); Amherst, MA
Nov 21, 2017*; 9:00 pm, BYUtv		at BYU; Barclays Center Classic	L 88–95	1–3	Marriott Center (10,791); Provo, UT
Nov 24, 2017*; 4:00 pm		Alabama A&M; Barclays Center Classic	W 96–74	2–3	Gallagher Center (842); Lewiston, NY
Nov 25, 2017*; 7:00 pm		UT Arlington; Barclays Center Classic	L 90–95	2–4	Gallagher Center (809); Lewiston, NY
Nov 27, 2017*; 7:00 pm, LCTV		Army	W 77–71	3–4	Gallagher Center (978); Lewiston, NY
Nov 29, 2017*; 7:00 pm, LCTV		Buffalo	L 87–106	3–5	Gallagher Center (1,664); Lewiston, NY
Dec 5, 2017*; 7:00 pm		at New Hampshire	W 78–70	4–5	Lundholm Gym (519); Durham, NH
Dec 10, 2017*; 2:00 pm, LCTV		Saint Francis (PA)	L 87–93 ^{OT}	4–6	Gallagher Center (1,002); Lewiston, NY
Dec 16, 2017*; 4:00 pm		at Norfolk State	W 85–82	5–6	Joseph G. Echols Memorial Hall (381); Norfolk, VA
Dec 19, 2017*; 7:00 pm		Cleveland State	W 79–77	6–6	Gallagher Center (934); Lewiston, NY
Dec 23, 2017*; 1:00 pm		at Cornell	W 89–86	7–6	Newman Arena (977); Ithaca, NY
MAAC regular season
Dec 29, 2017; 7:00 pm, LCTV		Iona	L 93–98 ^{OT}	7–7 (0–1)	Gallagher Center (966); Lewiston, NY
Dec 31, 2017; 1:00 pm, LCTV		Rider	L 76–99	7–8 (0–2)	Gallagher Center (870); Lewiston, NY
Jan 5, 2018; 7:00 pm		at Siena	W 84–76	8–8 (1–2)	Times Union Center (5,848); Albany, NY
Jan 7, 2018; 2:00 pm		at Marist	W 86–70	9–8 (2–2)	McCann Field House (1,198); Poughkeepsie, NY
Jan 12, 2018; 7:00 pm, LCTV		Monmouth	W 78–77	10–8 (3–2)	Gallagher Center (949); Lewiston, NY
Jan 14, 2018; 2:00 pm, LCTV		Saint Peter's	W 73–70	11–8 (4–2)	Gallagher Center (1,177); Lewiston, NY
Jan 18, 2018; 7:00 pm, ESPN3		at Quinnipiac	W 81–73	12–8 (5–2)	TD Bank Sports Center (1,288); Hamden, CT
Jan 20, 2018; 2:00 pm, ESPN3		at Fairfield	L 85–104	12–9 (5–3)	Webster Bank Arena (1,312); Bridgeport, CT
Jan 24, 2018; 7:00 pm		Manhattan	W 72–63	13–9 (6–3)	Gallagher Center (1,058); Lewiston, NY
Jan 27, 2018; 7:00 pm, ESPN3		at Canisius; Battle of the Bridge	W 105–89	14–9 (7–3)	Koessler Athletic Center (2,196); Buffalo, NY
Feb 2, 2018; 7:00 pm		at Saint Peter's	L 52–58	14–10 (7–4)	Yanitelli Center (543); Jersey City, NJ
Feb 4, 2018; 2:00 pm, ESPN3		at Monmouth	W 96–91	15–10 (8–4)	OceanFirst Bank Center (2,080); West Long Branch, NJ
Feb 8, 2018; 7:00 pm		Quinnipiac	W 95–76	16–10 (9–4)	Gallagher Center (1,061); Lewiston, NY
Feb 10, 2018; 7:00 pm, LCTV		Fairfield	W 95–83	17–10 (10–4)	Gallagher Center (1,389); Lewiston, NY
Feb 16, 2018; 7:00 pm, ESPN3		at Iona	W 85–84	18–10 (11–4)	Hynes Athletic Center (1,797); New Rochelle, NY
Feb 18, 2018; 2:00 pm		at Manhattan	L 72–82	18–11 (11–5)	Draddy Gymnasium (1,074); Riverdale, NY
Feb 21, 2018; 7:00 pm, LCTV		Canisius; Battle of the Bridge	L 88–95	18–12 (11–6)	Gallagher Center (2,311); Lewiston, NY
Feb 23, 2018; 7:00 pm, LCTV		Marist	W 100–76	19–12 (12–6)	Gallagher Center (1,217); Lewiston, NY
MAAC tournament
Mar 3, 2018; 7:00 pm, ESPN3	(3)	vs. (6) Fairfield; Quarterfinals	L 77–90	19–13	Times Union Center (2,630); Albany, NY
CIT
Mar 14, 2018*; 7:00 pm		at Eastern Michigan; First round	L 65–83	19–14	Convocation Center (1,138); Ypsilanti, MI
*Non-conference game. ^{#}Rankings from AP Poll. (#) Tournament seedings in parentheses. All times are in Eastern Time Source.
