= 2017–18 Canisius Golden Griffins men's basketball team =

American college basketball season

2017–18 Canisius Golden Griffins men's basketball
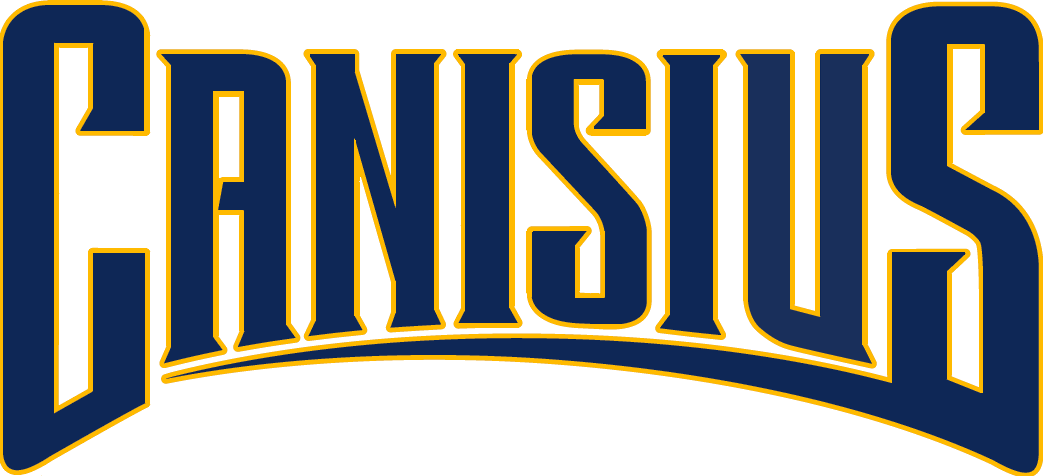

MAAC regular-season co-champion

CBI, first round
- Conference: Metro Atlantic Athletic Conference
- Record: 21–12 (15–3 MAAC)
- Head coach: Reggie Witherspoon (2nd season)
- Assistant coaches: Chris Hawkins; Larry Blunt; Eddie Shannon
- Home arena: Koessler Athletic Center

2017–18 MAAC men's basketball standings
	Conf.				Overall
Team	W		L	PCT	W		L	PCT
Rider	15	–	3	.833	22	–	10	.688
Canisius	15	–	3	.833	21	–	12	.636
Niagara	12	–	6	.667	19	–	14	.576
Iona †	11	–	7	.611	20	–	14	.588
Manhattan	9	–	9	.500	14	–	17	.452
Fairfield	9	–	9	.500	17	–	16	.515
Quinnipiac	7	–	11	.389	12	–	21	.364
Monmouth	7	–	11	.389	11	–	20	.355
Saint Peter's	6	–	12	.333	14	–	18	.438
Siena	4	–	14	.222	8	–	24	.250
Marist	4	–	14	.222	6	–	25	.194
† 2018 MAAC tournament winner

The 2017–18 Canisius Golden Griffins men's basketball team represented Canisius University during the 2017–18 NCAA Division I men's basketball season. The Golden Griffins, led by second-year head coach Reggie Witherspoon, played their home games at the Koessler Athletic Center in Buffalo, New York as members of the Metro Atlantic Athletic Conference (MAAC). They finished the season 21–11, 15–3 in MAAC play, to finish in a share for the MAAC regular-season title with Rider. It was the Golden Griffins' first conference regular-season title since 1994. As the No. 2 seed at the MAAC tournament, they were upset by in the quarterfinals by No. 7 seed Quinnipiac. They were invited to the College Basketball Invitational where they lost in the first round to Jacksonville State.

== Previous season ==
The Golden Griffins finished the 2016–17 season 18–16, 10–10 in MAAC play, to finish in a tie for sixth place. They defeated Marist in the first round of the MAAC tournament to advance to the quarterfinals where they lost to Saint Peter's. They were invited to the CollegeInsider.com Tournament where they lost in the first round to Samford.

== Roster ==
2017–18 Canisius Golden Griffins men's basketball team
Players
Coaches

Pos.	#	Name	Height	Weight	Year	Previous school	Hometown
G	1	Malik Johnson	5 ft 10 in (1.78 m)	155 lb (70 kg)	So	Blue Ridge School	Richmond, VA
F	2	Jermaine Crumpton	6 ft 6 in (1.98 m)	230 lb (104 kg)	Sr	Niagara Falls	Niagara Falls, NY
G	3	Jonathan Sanks	6 ft 4 in (1.93 m)	205 lb (93 kg)	Jr	Berkmar; Spartanburg Methodist College	Warner Robins, GA
F	4	Jalanni White	6 ft 7 in (2.01 m)	185 lb (84 kg)	Fr	Notre Dame (CT)	New Haven, CT
G	5	D.J. Heath	6 ft 0 in (1.83 m)	180 lb (82 kg)	Fr	Sacred Heart of Jesus Catholic School (AL)	Anniston, AL
C	10	Selvedin Planincic	6 ft 11 in (2.11 m)	210 lb (95 kg)	Sr	Orangeville Prep; Indian Hills CC	Sherbrooke, QC
F	11	Marcale Lotts	6 ft 8 in (2.03 m)	230 lb (104 kg)	Jr	Akins; Jacksonville College	New Orleans, LA
G	13	Isaiah Reese	6 ft 5 in (1.96 m)	185 lb (84 kg)	So	DME Academy	Miami, FL
G	14	Spencer Foley	6 ft 7 in (2.01 m)	190 lb (86 kg)	So	Uplift Community; Commonwealth Academy (MA)	Chicago, IL
G	15	Takal Molson	6 ft 5 in (1.96 m)	205 lb (93 kg)	Fr	TAAG Academy	Buffalo, NY
F	21	Scott Hitchon	6 ft 8 in (2.03 m)	215 lb (98 kg)	Fr	Thornlea Secondary School	Whitby, ON
F	22	Jibreel Faulkner	6 ft 8 in (2.03 m)	200 lb (91 kg)	Jr	Theodore Roosevelt Senior	Washington, D.C.
F	23	Dantai St. Louis	6 ft 8 in (2.03 m)	235 lb (107 kg)	So	Orangeville Prep	Brampton, ON
G	25	Shaquille Evans	6 ft 5 in (1.96 m)	218 lb (99 kg)	So	Faith Baptist Christian Academy; Atlanta Metro State	Nassau, Bahamas
G	32	Andrew Crombie	6 ft 3 in (1.91 m)	175 lb (79 kg)	Fr	Maryvale (NY)	Buffalo, NY
G	34	Talmadge James	6 ft 2 in (1.88 m)	170 lb (77 kg)	Fr	Kenmore West Senior	Buffalo, NY

Head coach

- Reggie Witherspoon (Wheeling)

Assistant coach(es)

- Chris Hawkins (Radford)
- Larry Blunt (James Madison)
- Eddie Shannon (Florida)

Legend

- (C) Team captain
- (S) Suspended
- (I) Ineligible
- (W) Walk-on
- Injured
- Current redshirt

Roster
Last update: April 18, 2025

== Schedule and results ==
Date time, TV	Rank^{#}	Opponent^{#}	Result	Record	Site (attendance) city, state
Non-conference regular season
November 11, 2017*; 1:00 p.m., ESPN3		at Buffalo	L 75–80	0–1	Alumni Arena (3,279); Amherst, NY
November 14, 2017*; 7:00 p.m.		at Air Force; Men Against Breast Cancer Showcase	L 79–93	0–2	Clune Arena (1,002); Colorado Springs, CO
November 18, 2017*; 7:00 p.m., ESPN3		Youngstown State	W 104–84	1–2	Koessler Athletic Center (1,245); Buffalo, NY
November 21, 2017*; 8:00 p.m., ESPN3		at Tennessee State	L 52–60	1–3	Gentry Complex (801); Nashville, TN
November 24, 2017*; 11:30 p.m.		vs. Texas State; Men Against Breast Cancer Showcase	W 68–62	2–3	Alex G. Spanos Center (1,349); Stockton, CA
November 25, 2017*; 11:30 p.m.		vs. Arkansas–Pine Bluff; Men Against Breast Cancer Showcase	W 81–58	3–3	Alex G. Spanos Center (1,325); Stockton, CA
November 26, 2017*; 6:00 p.m.		at Pacific; Men Against Breast Cancer Showcase	L 58–80	3–4	Alex G. Spanos Center (1,150); Stockton, CA
December 2, 2017*; 4:00 p.m., ESPN3		Dartmouth	W 73–60	4–4	Koessler Athletic Center (906); Buffalo, NY
December 6, 2017*; 7:00 p.m., ESPN3		St. Bonaventure	L 65–73	4–5	Koessler Athletic Center (2,196); Buffalo, NY
December 9, 2017*; 2:00 p.m., ESPN3		at Evansville	L 58–65	4–6	Ford Center (3,363); Evansville, IN
December 16, 2017*; 7:00 p.m., ESPN3		at Albany	L 65–68	4–7	SEFCU Arena (2,441); Albany, NY
December 19, 2017*; 7:00 p.m., ESPN3		Elon	W 67–51	5–7	Koessler Athletic Center (805); Buffalo, NY
December 22, 2017*; 7:00 p.m.		at Robert Morris	W 76–62	6–7	Palumbo Center (843); Pittsburgh, PA
MAAC regular season
December 29, 2017; 4:30 p.m., ESPN3		Rider	W 77–76	7–7 (1–0)	Koessler Athletic Center (1,049); Buffalo, NY
December 31, 2017; 1:00 p.m., ESPN3		Iona	W 85–78	8–7 (2–0)	Koessler Athletic Center (969); Buffalo, NY
January 5, 2018; 8:00 p.m., ESPN3		at Quinnipiac	W 82–74	9–7 (3–0)	TD Bank Sports Center (1,355); Hamden, CT
January 7, 2018; 3:00 p.m., ESPN3		at Siena	L 62–65	9–8 (3–1)	Times Union Center (6,114); Albany, NY
January 12, 2018; 7:00 p.m., ESPN3		Saint Peter's	W 70–58	10–8 (4–1)	Koessler Athletic Center (764); Buffalo, NY
January 14, 2018; 2:00 p.m., ESPN3		Monmouth	W 94–79	11–8 (5–1)	Koessler Athletic Center (1,136); Buffalo, NY
January 19, 2018; 9:00 p.m., ESPNU		at Manhattan	W 68–59	12–8 (6–1)	Draddy Gymnasium (1,344); Riverdale, NY
January 21, 2018; 1:00 p.m., ESPN3		at Iona	W 84–82	13–8 (7–1)	Hynes Athletic Center (1,567); New Rochelle, NY
January 27, 2018; 7:00 p.m., ESPN3		Niagara; Battle of the Bridge	L 89–105	13–9 (7–2)	Koessler Athletic Center (2,196); Buffalo, NY
February 2, 2018; 7:00 p.m., ESPN3		at Marist	W 73–67	14–9 (8–2)	McCann Field House (1,147); Poughkeepsie, NY
February 4, 2018; 2:00 p.m.		at Saint Peter's	W 73–58	15–9 (9–2)	Yanitelli Center (454); Jersey City, NJ
February 8, 2018; 7:00 p.m., ESPN3		Siena	W 89–65	16–9 (10–2)	Koessler Athletic Center (1,512); Buffalo, NY
February 10, 2018; 2:00 p.m., ESPN3		Quinnipiac	W 71–64	17–9 (11–2)	Koessler Athletic Center (1,239); Buffalo, NY
February 12, 2018; 7:00 p.m., ESPN3		Fairfield	W 81–63	18–9 (12–2)	Koessler Athletic Center (1,011); Buffalo, NY
February 16, 2018; 7:00 p.m., ESPN3		at Monmouth	W 78–60	19–9 (13–2)	OceanFirst Bank Center (2,854); West Long Branch, NJ
February 18, 2018; 2:00 p.m., ESPN3		at Rider	L 82–83	19–10 (13–3)	Alumni Gymnasium (1,650); Lawrenceville, NJ
February 21, 2018; 7:00 p.m.		at Niagara; Battle of the Bridge	W 95–88	20–10 (14–3)	Gallagher Center (2,311); Lewiston, NY
February 25, 2018; 2:00 p.m., ESPN3		Marist	W 98–74	21–10 (15–3)	Koessler Athletic Center (2,033); Buffalo, NY
MAAC tournament
March 2, 2018; 9:30 p.m., ESPN3	(2)	vs. (7) Quinnipiac; Quarterfinals	L 69–72	21–11	Times Union Center (2,096); Albany, NY
CBI
March 14, 2018*; 7:00 p.m., ESPN3		Jacksonville State; First round	L 78–80 ^{OT}	21–12	Koessler Athletic Center (870); Buffalo, NY
*Non-conference game. ^{#}Rankings from AP poll. (#) Tournament seedings in parentheses. All times are in Eastern.
