= 2017–18 Quinnipiac Bobcats men's basketball team =

American college basketball season

2017–18 Quinnipiac Bobcats men's basketball
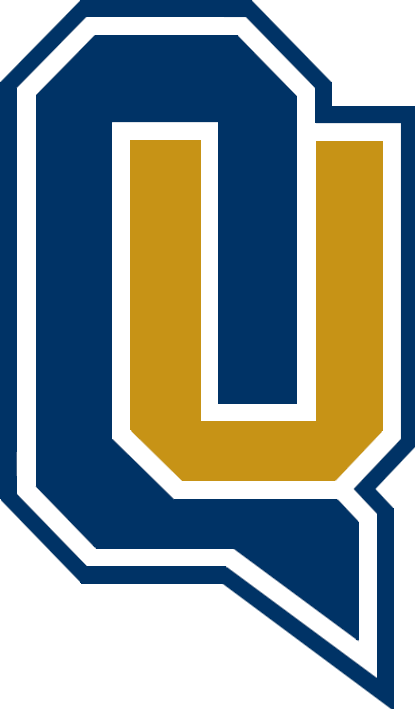
- Conference: Metro Atlantic Athletic Conference
- Record: 12–21 (7–11 MAAC)
- Head coach: Baker Dunleavy (1st season)
- Assistant coaches: Tom Pecora; Shaun Morris; Anthony Goins
- Home arena: TD Bank Sports Center

2017–18 MAAC men's basketball standings
	Conf.				Overall
Team	W		L	PCT	W		L	PCT
Rider	15	–	3	.833	22	–	10	.688
Canisius	15	–	3	.833	21	–	12	.636
Niagara	12	–	6	.667	19	–	14	.576
Iona †	11	–	7	.611	20	–	14	.588
Manhattan	9	–	9	.500	14	–	17	.452
Fairfield	9	–	9	.500	17	–	16	.515
Quinnipiac	7	–	11	.389	12	–	21	.364
Monmouth	7	–	11	.389	11	–	20	.355
Saint Peter's	6	–	12	.333	14	–	18	.438
Siena	4	–	14	.222	8	–	24	.250
Marist	4	–	14	.222	6	–	25	.194
† 2018 MAAC tournament winner

The 2017–18 Quinnipiac Bobcats men's basketball team represented Quinnipiac University during the 2017–18 NCAA Division I men's basketball season. The Bobcats, led by first-year head coach Baker Dunleavy, played their home games at TD Bank Sports Center in Hamden, Connecticut as members of the Metro Atlantic Athletic Conference. They finished the season 12–21 overall, 7–11 in MAAC play to finish in a tie for seventh place. As the No. 7 seed at the MAAC tournament, they defeated No. 10 seed Siena and upset No. 2 seed Canisius to advance to the semifinals where they lost to No. 6 seed Fairfield.

== Previous season ==
The Bobcats finished the 2016–17 season 10–21, 7–13 in MAAC play to finish in eighth place. They lost in the first round of the MAAC tournament to Niagara.

On March 7, 2017, head coach Tom Moore was fired. He finished at Quinnipiac with a ten-year record of 162–146. On March 27, Villanova assistant coach Baker Dunleavy was hired as the Bobcats next head coach.

== Roster ==
2017–18 Quinnipiac Bobcats men's basketball team
Players
Coaches

Pos.	#	Name	Height	Weight	Year	Previous school	Hometown
G	0	Aaron Robinson	6 ft 6 in (1.98 m)	215 lb (98 kg)	Jr	Springbrook; Putnam Science Academy	Takoma Park, Maryland
G	1	Cameron Young	6 ft 6 in (1.98 m)	205 lb (93 kg)	Sr	Westchester	Los Angeles, California
G	2	Sam Donahue	6 ft 1 in (1.85 m)	180 lb (82 kg)	GS	Northfield Mount Hermon School	Stonington, Connecticut
G	3	Travis Atson	6 ft 5 in (1.96 m)	205 lb (93 kg)	So	South Kent School; Tulsa	Brooklyn, New York
G	4	Matt Donahue	6 ft 3 in (1.91 m)	175 lb (79 kg)	Fr	Northfield Mount Hermon School	Stonington, Connecticut
F	11	Alain Chigha	6 ft 7 in (2.01 m)	207 lb (94 kg)	GS	The Rock School (FL)	Yaoundé, Cameroon
G	12	Isaiah Washington	6 ft 4 in (1.93 m)	170 lb (77 kg)	GS	Williamsport Area; Penn State	Williamsport, Pennsylvania
F	13	Chaise Daniels	6 ft 9 in (2.06 m)	220 lb (100 kg)	Sr	Hillhouse; Putnam Science Academy	Meriden, Connecticut
G	14	Andrew Robinson	6 ft 6 in (1.98 m)	215 lb (98 kg)	Jr	Springbrook; Putnam Science Academy	Takoma Park, Maryland
G	15	Rich Kelly	6 ft 1 in (1.85 m)	175 lb (79 kg)	Fr	Fairfield College Prep; Cheshire Academy	Shelton, Connecticut
F	21	Nathan David	6 ft 7 in (2.01 m)	200 lb (91 kg)	Fr	J.K. Mullen; New Hampton School	Denver, Colorado
F	25	Jacob Rigoni	6 ft 6 in (1.98 m)	190 lb (86 kg)	Fr	Mercedes College	Adelaide, Australia
F	30	Kevin Marfo	6 ft 8 in (2.03 m)	245 lb (111 kg)	So	Worcester Academy; George Washington	Bergenfield, New Jersey
G	33	Greg Tarca	6 ft 4 in (1.93 m)	195 lb (88 kg)	Sr	Montgomery	Montgomery, New Jersey
F	34	Abdulai Bundu	6 ft 7 in (2.01 m)	215 lb (98 kg)	Jr	Largo (MD)	Upper Marlboro, Maryland

Head coach

- Baker Dunleavy (Villanova)

Assistant coach(es)

- Tom Pecora (Adelphi)
- Shaun Morris (Lycoming)
- Anthony Goins (St. John's)

Legend

- (C) Team captain
- (S) Suspended
- (I) Ineligible
- (W) Walk-on
- Injured
- Current redshirt

Roster
Last update: December 31, 2017

== Schedule and results ==
Date time, TV	Rank^{#}	Opponent^{#}	Result	Record	Site (attendance) city, state
Non-conference regular season
Nov 11, 2017*; 2:00 pm		Dartmouth	W 78–77	1–0	TD Bank Sports Center (2,724); Hamden, CT
Nov 13, 2017*; 7:00 pm		Brown	L 72–79	1–1	TD Bank Sports Center (1,180); Hamden, CT
Nov 17, 2017*; 6:00 pm		vs. Colorado; Paradise Jam quarterfinals	L 69–70	1–2	Vines Center (659); Lynchburg, VA
Nov 18, 2017*; 2:30 pm		vs. Wake Forest; Paradise Jam consolation 2nd round	L 55–72	1–3	Vines Center (743); Lynchburg, VA
Nov 19, 2017*; 12:00 pm		at Liberty; Paradise Jam 7th place game	L 72–84	1–4	Vines Center (640); Lynchburg, VA
Nov 26, 2017*; 2:00 pm, ESPN3		Maine	L 72–78	1–5	TD Bank Sports Center (1,103); Hamden, CT
Nov 29, 2017*; 7:00 pm, ESPN3		Massachusetts	W 68–66	2–5	TD Bank Sports Center (1,422); Hamden, CT
Dec 2, 2017*; 2:00 pm		at Lafayette	L 58–79	2–6	Kirby Sports Center (1,422); Easton, PA
Dec 4, 2017*; 7:00 pm, SNY		at Columbia	W 89–87	3–6	Levien Gymnasium (873); New York City, NY
Dec 7, 2017*; 7:00 pm, ESPN3		at Hartford	L 75–77	3–7	Chase Arena at Reich Family Pavilion (1,019); Hartford, CT
Dec 18, 2017*; 7:00 pm		at Drexel	L 71–72	3–8	Daskalakis Athletic Center (652); Philadelphia, PA
Dec 21, 2017*; 7:00 pm, ESPN3		at Vermont	L 73–80	3–9	Patrick Gym (2,349); Burlington, VT
MAAC regular season
Dec 28, 2017; 7:30 pm, ESPN3		Monmouth	W 78–76	4–9 (1–0)	TD Bank Sports Center (1,897); Hamden, CT
Jan 1, 2018; 1:00 pm, ESPN3		at Siena	W 71–70	5–9 (2–0)	Times Union Center (5,278); Albany, NY
Jan 5, 2018; 8:00 pm, ESPN3		Canisius	L 74–82	5–10 (2–1)	TD Bank Sports Center (1,355); Hamden, CT
Jan 7, 2018; 2:00 pm		at Saint Peter's	L 58–84	5–11 (2–2)	Yanitelli Center (602); Jersey City, NJ
Jan 10, 2018; 7:00 pm, ESPN3		Marist	W 80–79 ^{OT}	6–11 (3–2)	TD Bank Sports Center (890); Hamden, CT
Jan 12, 2018; 7:00 pm		at Rider	L 60–78	6–12 (3–3)	Alumni Gymnasium (1,508); Lawrenceville, NJ
Jan 18, 2018; 7:00 pm, ESPN3		Niagara	L 73–81	6–13 (3–4)	TD Bank Sports Center (1,288); Hamden, CT
Jan 21, 2018; 2:00 pm, ESPN3		Siena	W 76–69	7–13 (4–4)	TD Bank Sports Center (1,915); Hamden, CT
Jan 25, 2018; 7:00 pm		at Marist	W 85–77	8–13 (5–4)	McCann Field House (1,264); Poughkeepsie, NY
Jan 27, 2018; 1:00 pm, ESPN3		vs. Fairfield; MAAC Tripleheader	W 75–70	9–13 (6–4)	Nassau Veterans Memorial Coliseum (2,545); Uniondale, NY
Feb 2, 2018; 7:00 pm, ESPN3		at Iona	L 82–87 ^{2OT}	9–14 (6–5)	Hynes Athletic Center (1,857); New Rochelle, NY
Feb 4, 2018; 2:30 pm, ESPN3		Rider	L 59–74	9–15 (6–6)	TD Bank Sports Center (1,618); Hamden, CT
Feb 8, 2018; 7:00 pm		at Niagara	L 76–95	9–16 (6–7)	Gallagher Center (1,061); Lewiston, NY
Feb 10, 2018; 2:00 pm, ESPN3		at Canisius	L 64–71	9–17 (6–8)	Koessler Athletic Center (1,239); Buffalo, NY
Feb 15, 2018; 7:00 pm, ESPN3		Manhattan	W 71–70	10–17 (7–8)	TD Bank Sports Center (1,271); Hamden, CT
Feb 17, 2018; 1:00 pm		at Fairfield	L 98–102 ^{2OT}	10–18 (7–9)	Webster Bank Arena (1,762); Bridgeport, CT
Feb 23, 2018; 7:00 pm, ESPN3		Saint Peter's	L 43–52	10–19 (7–10)	TD Bank Sports Center (2,392); Hamden, CT
Feb 25, 2018; 6:00 pm		at Manhattan	L 86–92 ^{2OT}	10–20 (7–11)	Draddy Gymnasium (1,259); Riverdale, NY
MAAC tournament
Mar 1, 2018; 7:30 pm, ESPN3	(7)	at No. 10 Siena; First round	W 67–58	11–20	Times Union Center; Albany, NY
Mar 2, 2018; 9:30 pm, ESPN3	(7)	vs. No. 2 Canisius; Quarterfinals	W 72–69	12–20	Times Union Center (2,096); Albany, NY
Mar 4, 2018; 9:30 pm, ESPNU	(7)	vs. No. 6 Fairfield; Semifinals	L 64–74	12–21	Times Union Center (2,151); Albany, NY
*Non-conference game. ^{#}Rankings from AP Poll. (#) Tournament seedings in parentheses. All times are in Eastern Time.
