= 2017–18 Marist Red Foxes men's basketball team =

American college basketball season

2017–18 Marist Red Foxes men's basketball
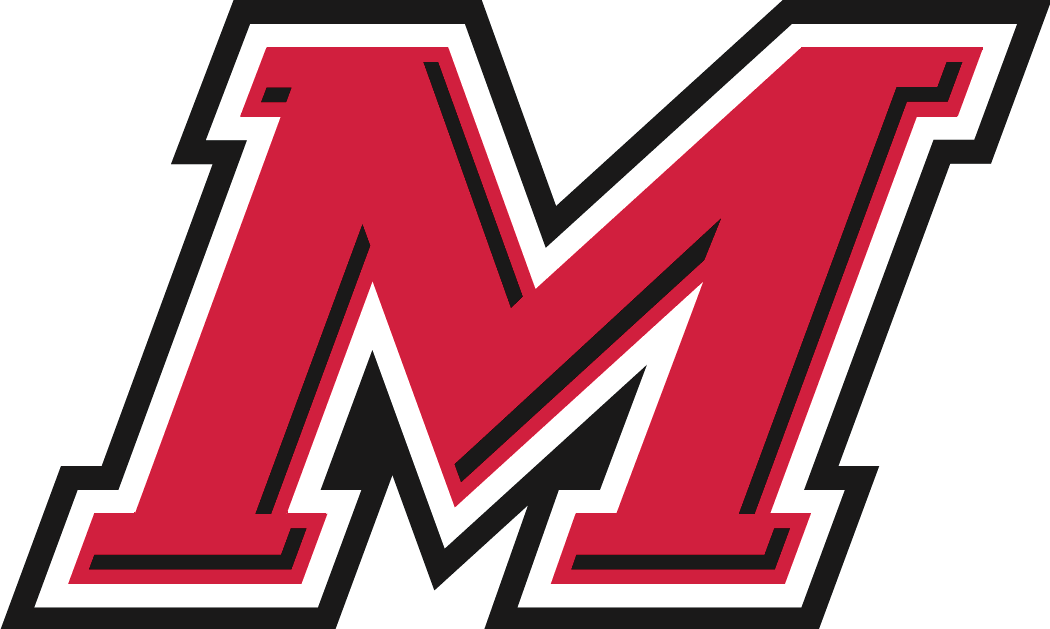
- Conference: Metro Atlantic Athletic Conference
- Record: 6–25 (4–14 MAAC)
- Head coach: Mike Maker (4th season)
- Assistant coaches: Paul Lee; Andy Johnston; C. J. Lee
- Home arena: McCann Arena

2017–18 MAAC men's basketball standings
	Conf.				Overall
Team	W		L	PCT	W		L	PCT
Rider	15	–	3	.833	22	–	10	.688
Canisius	15	–	3	.833	21	–	12	.636
Niagara	12	–	6	.667	19	–	14	.576
Iona †	11	–	7	.611	20	–	14	.588
Manhattan	9	–	9	.500	14	–	17	.452
Fairfield	9	–	9	.500	17	–	16	.515
Quinnipiac	7	–	11	.389	12	–	21	.364
Monmouth	7	–	11	.389	11	–	20	.355
Saint Peter's	6	–	12	.333	14	–	18	.438
Siena	4	–	14	.222	8	–	24	.250
Marist	4	–	14	.222	6	–	25	.194
† 2018 MAAC tournament winner

The 2017–18 Marist Red Foxes men's basketball team represented Marist College during the 2017–18 NCAA Division I men's basketball season. The Red Foxes, led by fourth year head coach Mike Maker, played their home games at the McCann Arena in Poughkeepsie, New York as members of the Metro Atlantic Athletic Conference. They finished the season 6–25, 4–14 in MAAC play to finish in a tie for tenth place. They lost in the first round of the MAAC tournament to Fairfield.

On March 5, 2018, head coach Mike Maker was fired. He finished at Marist with a four-year record of 28–97. Marist hired Saint Peter's head coach John Dunne as Maker's successor on April 3.

== Previous season ==
The Red Foxes finished the 2016–17 season 8–24, 5–15 in MAAC play to finish in a tie for tenth place. They lost in the first round of the MAAC tournament to Canisius.

== Roster ==
2017–18 Marist Red Foxes men's basketball team
Players
Coaches

Pos.	#	Name	Height	Weight	Year	Previous school	Hometown
G	0	Andrea Bernardi	6 ft 4 in (1.93 m)	180 lb (82 kg)	Fr	Liceo Scientifico "Galileo Galilei"	Trento, Italy
G	1	Richie Mitchell	6 ft 1 in (1.85 m)	175 lb (79 kg)	Jr	Don Bosco Prep	Michigan City, IN
G	2	Brian Parker	6 ft 3 in (1.91 m)	215 lb (98 kg)	Jr	Villa Angela-St. Joseph HS	Cleveland, OH
F	4	Isaiah Lamb	6 ft 4 in (1.93 m)	205 lb (93 kg)	Jr	Dulaney HS	Baltimore, MD
G	5	Ryan Carmello	5 ft 11 in (1.8 m)	160 lb (73 kg)	Fr	Troy HS	Latham, NY
C	11	Tobias Sjoberg	6 ft 9 in (2.06 m)	250 lb (113 kg)	So	Malmö Idrottsgymnasium	Malmö, Sweden
G/F	13	Kristinn Palsson	6 ft 6 in (1.98 m)	200 lb (91 kg)	Jr	Marymount HS	Reykjanesbær, Iceland
F	14	Aleksandar Dozic	6 ft 9 in (2.06 m)	220 lb (100 kg)	RS So	Don Bosco Prep; Marshall	Podgorica, Montenegro
F	15	Obi Momah	6 ft 7 in (2.01 m)	250 lb (113 kg)	Sr	Farmington HS	Farmington, CT
G	22	Austin Williams	6 ft 3 in (1.91 m)	185 lb (84 kg)	Fr	Seton Hall Prep	West Orange, NJ
G	25	Tucker Lee	6 ft 3 in (1.91 m)	180 lb (82 kg)	Fr	Spackenkill HS	Poughkeepsie, NY
G/F	30	Ryan Funk	6 ft 6 in (1.98 m)	190 lb (86 kg)	Jr	St. Thomas More Prep	Clarence, NY
G	32	Michael Servetas	6 ft 2 in (1.88 m)	190 lb (86 kg)	Fr	Bridgeton Prep	Trumbull, CT
C	33	Connor McClenaghan	6 ft 9 in (2.06 m)	245 lb (111 kg)	Sr	Hebron HS	Carrollton, TX
G/F	34	David Knudsen	6 ft 5 in (1.96 m)	205 lb (93 kg)	Jr	Falkonergardens	Copenhagen, Denmark
F	35	Lasse Gummerus	6 ft 8 in (2.03 m)	210 lb (95 kg)	Fr	Leppavaara General	Espoo, Finland

Head coach

- Mike Maker (Cal Baptist)

Assistant coach(es)

- Paul Lee (Columbia)
- Andy Johnston (New Hampshire)
- C.J. Lee (Michigan)

Legend

- (C) Team captain
- (S) Suspended
- (I) Ineligible
- (W) Walk-on
- Injured
- Current redshirt

Roster
Last update: 2017-12-20

== Schedule and results ==
Date time, TV	Rank^{#}	Opponent^{#}	Result	Record	Site (attendance) city, state
Non-conference regular season
Nov 11, 2017*; 7:00 pm, ESPN3		Lehigh	L 76–84	0–1	McCann Arena (1,387); Poughkeepsie, NY
Nov 15, 2017*; 7:30 pm, ESPN3		at UMass Lowell	L 73–76	0–2	Costello Athletic Center (713); Lowell, MA
Nov 18, 2017*; 7:00 pm		Army	L 73–94	0–3	McCann Arena (1,339); Poughkeepsie, NY
Nov 23, 2017*; 8:30 pm, ESPNews		vs. No. 23–T West Virginia; AdvoCare Invitational quarterfinals	L 78–84	0–4	HP Field House (1,339); Lake Buena Vista, FL
Nov 24, 2017*; 7:00 pm, ESPN3		vs. Nebraska; AdvoCare Invitational consolation 2nd round	L 59–84	0–5	HP Field House (2,834); Lake Buena Vista, FL
Nov 26, 2017*; 7:00 pm, ESPN3		vs. Oregon State; AdvoCare Invitational 7th place game	L 46–65	0–6	HP Field House (2,591); Lake Buena Vista, FL
Dec 1, 2017*; 3:00 pm, ESPN3		at The Citadel; Bulldog Bash semifinals	W 100–91	1–6	McAlister Field House (609); Charleston, SC
Dec 2, 2017*; 5:00 pm		vs. Army; Bulldog Bash finals	L 75–82	1–7	McAlister Field House (673); Charleston, SC
Dec 6, 2017*; 7:30 pm, ESPN3		Colgate	W 78–76	2–7	McCann Arena (980); Poughkeepsie, NY
Dec 9, 2017*; 1:00 pm, ESPN3		Stetson	L 76–79	2–8	McCann Arena (1,123); Poughkeepsie, NY
Dec 16, 2017*; 7:00 pm		at Murray State	L 63–100	2–9	CFSB Center (2,250); Murray, KY
Dec 22, 2017*; 3:30 pm, ILN		at Brown	L 69–90	2–10	Pizzitola Sports Center (750); Providence, RI
MAAC regular season
Dec 29, 2017; 7:00 pm, ESPN3		Siena	W 63–58	3–10 (1–0)	McCann Arena (1,737); Poughkeepsie, NY
Jan 2, 2018; 7:00 pm, ESPN3		Manhattan	L 96–101 ^{OT}	3–11 (1–1)	McCann Arena (893); Poughkeepsie, NY
Jan 7, 2018; 2:00 pm, ESPN3		Niagara	L 70–86	3–12 (1–2)	McCann Arena (1,198); Poughkeepsie, NY
Jan 10, 2018; 7:00 pm, ESPN3		at Quinnipiac	L 79–80 ^{OT}	3–13 (1–3)	TD Bank Sports Center (890); Hamden, CT
Jan 13, 2018; 7:00 pm, ESPN3		Fairfield	W 95–89 ^{OT}	4–13 (2–3)	McCann Arena (1,288); Poughkeepsie, NY
Jan 18, 2018; 7:00 pm, ESPN3		at Siena	L 65–68	4–14 (2–4)	Times Union Center (5,662); Albany, NY
Jan 20, 2018; 7:00 pm		at Rider	L 57–60	4–15 (2–5)	Alumni Gymnasium (1,650); Lawrenceville, NJ
Jan 25, 2018; 7:00 pm, ESPN3		Quinnipiac	L 77–85	4–16 (2–6)	McCann Arena (1,264); Poughkeepsie, NY
Jan 27, 2018; 4:00 pm		vs. Monmouth; MAAC Tripleheader	L 78–91	4–17 (2–7)	Nassau Veterans Memorial Coliseum (2,545); Uniondale, NY
Jan 30, 2018; 7:00 pm		at Manhattan	W 62–59	5–17 (3–7)	Draddy Gymnasium (981); Riverdale, NY
Feb 2, 2018; 7:00 pm, ESPN3		Canisius	L 67–73	5–18 (3–8)	McCann Arena (1,147); Poughkeepsie, NY
Feb 4, 2018; 12:00 pm, ESPN3		Iona	L 64–98	5–19 (3–9)	McCann Arena (1,145); Poughkeepsie, NY
Feb 8, 2018; 7:00 pm		at Saint Peter's	L 66–70	5–20 (3–10)	Yanitelli Center (908); Jersey City, NJ
Feb 10, 2018; 7:00 pm, ESPN3		Rider	L 79–89	5–21 (3–11)	McCann Arena (1,211); Poughkeepsie, NY
Feb 15, 2018; 7:00 pm, ESPN3		at Fairfield	L 79–83	5–22 (3–12)	Webster Bank Arena (1,191); Bridgeport, CT
Feb 17, 2018; 7:00 pm, ESPN3		Saint Peter's	W 69–51	6–22 (4–12)	McCann Arena (1,204); Poughkeepsie, NY
Feb 23, 2018; 7:00 pm		at Niagara	L 76–100	6–23 (4–13)	Gallagher Center (1,217); Lewiston, NY
Feb 25, 2018; 2:00 pm, ESPN3		at Canisius	L 74–98	6–24 (4–14)	Koessler Athletic Center (2,033); Buffalo, NY
MAAC tournament
Mar 1, 2018; 10:00 pm, ESPN3	(11)	vs. (6) Fairfield; First round	L 57–71	6–25	Times Union Center; Albany, NY
*Non-conference game. ^{#}Rankings from AP Poll. (#) Tournament seedings in parentheses. All times are in Eastern Time.

== See also ==
2017–18 Marist Red Foxes women's basketball team
