= 2017–18 Rider Broncs men's basketball team =

American college basketball season

2017–18 Rider Broncs men's basketball
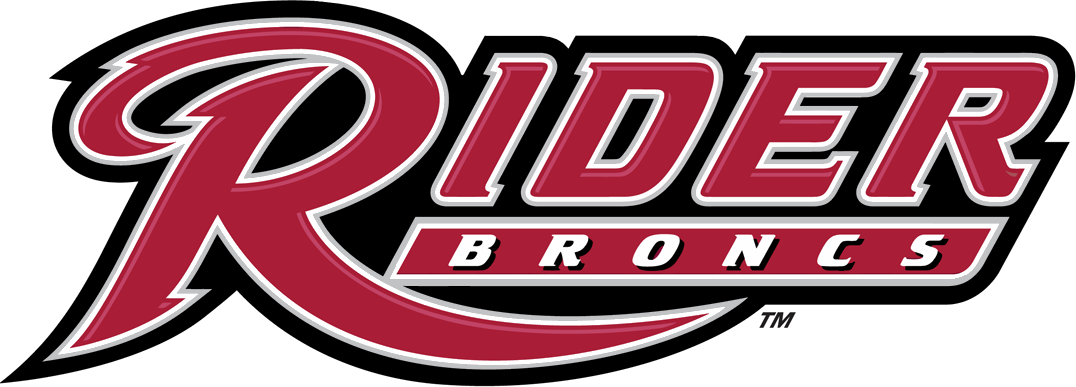

MAAC Regular Season co-champion Las Vegas Invitational Visitor's Bracket champions

NIT, First Round
- Conference: Metro Atlantic Athletic Conference
- Record: 22–10 (15–3 MAAC)
- Head coach: Kevin Baggett (6th season)
- Assistant coaches: Ben Luber; Dino Presley; Marlon Guild
- Home arena: Alumni Gymnasium

2017–18 MAAC men's basketball standings
	Conf.				Overall
Team	W		L	PCT	W		L	PCT
Rider	15	–	3	.833	22	–	10	.688
Canisius	15	–	3	.833	21	–	12	.636
Niagara	12	–	6	.667	19	–	14	.576
Iona †	11	–	7	.611	20	–	14	.588
Manhattan	9	–	9	.500	14	–	17	.452
Fairfield	9	–	9	.500	17	–	16	.515
Quinnipiac	7	–	11	.389	12	–	21	.364
Monmouth	7	–	11	.389	11	–	20	.355
Saint Peter's	6	–	12	.333	14	–	18	.438
Siena	4	–	14	.222	8	–	24	.250
Marist	4	–	14	.222	6	–	25	.194
† 2018 MAAC tournament winner

The 2017–18 Rider Broncs men's basketball team represented Rider University during the 2017–18 NCAA Division I men's basketball season. The Broncs, led by sixth-year head coach Kevin Baggett, played their home games at Alumni Gymnasium in Lawrenceville, New Jersey as members of the Metro Atlantic Athletic Conference. They finished the season 22–10, 15–3 in MAAC play to finish in a tie for the MAAC regular season championship with Canisius. After tie breakers, they were the No. 1 seed in the MAAC tournament where they were upset in the quarterfinals by Saint Peter's. As a regular season conference champion, and No. 1 seed in their conference tournament, who failed to win their conference tournament, they received an automatic bid to the National Invitation Tournament where they lost in the first round to Oregon.

== Previous season ==
The Broncs finished the 2016–17 season 18–15, 10–10 in MAAC play to finish in a tie for sixth place. They defeated Manhattan in the first round of the MAAC tournament before losing in the quarterfinals to Iona.

== Roster ==
2017–18 Rider Broncs men's basketball team
Players
Coaches

Pos.	#	Name	Height	Weight	Year	Hometown
G	2	Jordan Allen	6 ft 4 in (1.93 m)	195 lb (88 kg)	RS Fr	Dover, Delaware
G	3	Noah Buono	6 ft 6 in (1.98 m)	170 lb (77 kg)	Fr	Brick, New Jersey
G	5	Tyrei Randall	6 ft 5 in (1.96 m)	165 lb (75 kg)	Fr	Aurora, Colorado
G	10	Kealen Washington-Ives	5 ft 9 in (1.75 m)	165 lb (75 kg)	Jr	Providence, Rhode Island
F	11	Devine Eke	6 ft 8 in (2.03 m)	201 lb (91 kg)	So	Plainfield, New Jersey
G	12	Anthony Durham	6 ft 3 in (1.91 m)	190 lb (86 kg)	Jr	Philadelphia, Pennsylvania
F	13	Frederick Scott	6 ft 8 in (2.03 m)	223 lb (101 kg)	RS Fr	Munster, Indiana
G/F	14	Dimencio Vaughn	6 ft 5 in (1.96 m)	210 lb (95 kg)	RS Fr	New York, New York
F	15	Karamoko Cisse	6 ft 7 in (2.01 m)	225 lb (102 kg)	Jr	Denver, Colorado
C	20	Tyere Marshall	6 ft 9 in (2.06 m)	220 lb (100 kg)	So	Philadelphia, Pennsylvania
G	22	Kimar Williams	6 ft 1 in (1.85 m)	175 lb (79 kg)	Jr	Philadelphia, Pennsylvania
G	23	Stevie Jordan	6 ft 0 in (1.83 m)	170 lb (77 kg)	So	Bensalem, Pennsylvania
G	24	Ryan O'Leary	6 ft 5 in (1.96 m)	180 lb (82 kg)	Fr	Sayreville, New Jersey
G	25	Joe Ajike	6 ft 4 in (1.93 m)	200 lb (91 kg)	Sr	Cherry Hill, New Jersey
G	32	Ahmad Gilbert	6 ft 6 in (1.98 m)	205 lb (93 kg)	Jr	Philadelphia, Pennsylvania
G	44	Paxton Wilson	6 ft 3 in (1.91 m)	180 lb (82 kg)	Fr	Clearwater, Florida

Head coach

- Kevin Baggett (Saint Joseph's)

Assistant coach(es)

- Ben Luber (Penn State)
- Dino Presley (Kutztown)
- Marlon Guild (Hartford)

Legend

- (C) Team captain
- (S) Suspended
- (I) Ineligible
- (W) Walk-on
- Injured
- Current redshirt

Roster
Last update: December 30, 2017

== Schedule and results ==
Date time, TV	Rank^{#}	Opponent^{#}	Result	Record	Site (attendance) city, state
Exhibition
Nov 4, 2017*; 4:00 pm		Ningbo University (China)	W 115–71		Alumni Gymnasium (1,650); Lawrenceville, NJ
Non-conference regular season
Nov 10, 2017*; 8:00 pm		Hampton	W 90–75	1–0	Alumni Gymnasium (1,600); Lawrenceville, NJ
Nov 13, 2017*; 8:30 pm, FS1		at No. 15 Xavier; Las Vegas Invitational campus game	L 75–101	1–1	Cintas Center (10,224); Cincinnati, OH
Nov 15, 2017*; 7:00 pm		Hartford	W 89–53	2–1	Alumni Gymnasium (1,223); Lawrenceville, NJ
Nov 20, 2017*; 7:00 pm		at George Washington; Las Vegas Invitational campus game	W 67–65	3–1	Charles E. Smith Center (2,118); Washington, D.C.
Nov 23, 2017*; 10:00 pm		vs. UC Irvine; Las Vegas Invitational visitor's bracket semifinals	W 90–82	4–1	Orleans Arena (3,245); Paradise, NV
Nov 24, 2017*; 10:30 pm		vs. Hampton; Las Vegas Invitational visitor's bracket championship	W 94–80	5–1	Orleans Arena (3,325); Paradise, NV
Nov 29, 2017*; 7:00 pm, FSN		at Providence	L 84–88	5–2	Dunkin' Donuts Center (7,255); Providence, RI
Dec 2, 2017*; 4:00 pm		at Drexel	L 77–89	5–3	Daskalakis Athletic Center (1,010); Philadelphia, PA
Dec 6, 2017*; 7:00 pm		at Robert Morris	L 75–78	5–4	PPG Paints Arena (864); Pittsburgh, PA
Dec 9, 2017*; 7:00 pm		Hofstra	L 82–88	5–5	Alumni Gymnasium (1,427); Lawrenceville, NJ
Dec 16, 2017*; 4:00 pm		Wagner	W 90–84 ^{OT}	6–5	Alumni Gymnasium (1,328); Lawrenceville, NJ
Dec 22, 2017*; 7:00 pm, BTN		at Penn State	W 71–70	7–5	Bryce Jordan Center (4,217); University Park, PA
MAAC regular season
Dec 29, 2017; 4:30 pm, ESPN3		at Canisius	L 76–77	7–6 (0–1)	Koessler Athletic Center (1,049); Buffalo, NY
Dec 31, 2017; 1:00 pm		at Niagara	W 99–76	8–6 (1–1)	Gallagher Center (870); Lewiston, NY
Jan 5, 2018; 7:00 pm		Fairfield	W 96–77	9–6 (2–1)	Alumni Gymnasium (1,405); Lawrenceville, NJ
Jan 7, 2018; 6:00 pm		at Manhattan	W 82–76	10–6 (3–1)	Draddy Gymnasium (521); Riverdale, NY
Jan 12, 2018; 7:00 pm		Quinnipiac	W 78–60	11–6 (4–1)	Alumni Gymnasium (1,508); Lawrenceville, NJ
Jan 14, 2018; 1:00 pm, ESPN3		at Iona	L 64–91	11–7 (4–2)	Hynes Athletic Center (1,193); New Rochelle, NY
Jan 18, 2018; 7:30 pm		at Saint Peter's	W 88–84	12–7 (5–2)	Yanitelli Center (555); Jersey City, NJ
Jan 20, 2018; 7:00 pm		Marist	W 60–57	13–7 (6–2)	Alumni Gymnasium (1,650); Lawrenceville, NJ
Jan 23, 2018; 7:00 pm, ESPN3		at Fairfield	W 90–88	14–7 (7–2)	Webster Bank Arena (1,137); Bridgeport, CT
Jan 26, 2018; 7:00 pm, ESPNU		Saint Peter's	W 63-60	15-7 (8-2)	Alumni Gymnasium (1,650); Lawrenceville, NJ
Jan 29, 2018; 7:00 pm		Monmouth	W 92–85	16–7 (9–2)	Alumni Gymnasium (1,650); Lawrenceville, NJ
Feb 4, 2018; 2:30 pm, ESPN3		at Quinnipiac	W 74–59	17–7 (10–2)	TD Bank Sports Center (1,618); Hamden, CT
Feb 8, 2018; 7:00 pm		Manhattan	W 77–73	18–7 (11–2)	Alumni Gymnasium (1,514); Lawrenceville, NJ
Feb 10, 2018; 7:00 pm, ESPN3		at Marist	W 89–79	19–7 (12–2)	McCann Field House (1,211); Poughkeepsie, NY
Feb 15, 2018; 7:00 pm		Siena	W 97–71	20–7 (13–2)	Alumni Gymnasium (1,519); Lawrenceville, NJ
Feb 18, 2018; 2:00 pm		Canisius	W 83–82	21–7 (14–2)	Alumni Gymnasium (1,650); Lawrenceville, NJ
Feb 22, 2018; 7:00 pm, ESPN3		at Monmouth	L 77–91	21–8 (14–3)	OceanFirst Bank Center (2,110); West Long Branch, NJ
Feb 25, 2018; 2:00 pm		Iona	W 110–101	22–8 (15–3)	Alumni Gymnasium (1,650); Lawrenceville, NJ
MAAC tournament
Mar 2, 2018; 7:00 pm, ESPN3	(1)	vs. (9) Saint Peter's; Quarterfinals	L 55–66	22–9	Times Union Center (2,096); Albany, NY
NIT
Mar 13, 2018*; 10:00 pm, ESPN3	(6)	at (3) Oregon; First Round – Notre Dame Bracket	L 86–99	22–10	Matthew Knight Arena (2,327); Eugene, OR
*Non-conference game. ^{#}Rankings from AP Poll. (#) Tournament seedings in parentheses. All times are in Eastern Time.
