= 2017–18 Iona Gaels men's basketball team =

American college basketball season

2017–18 Iona Gaels men's basketball
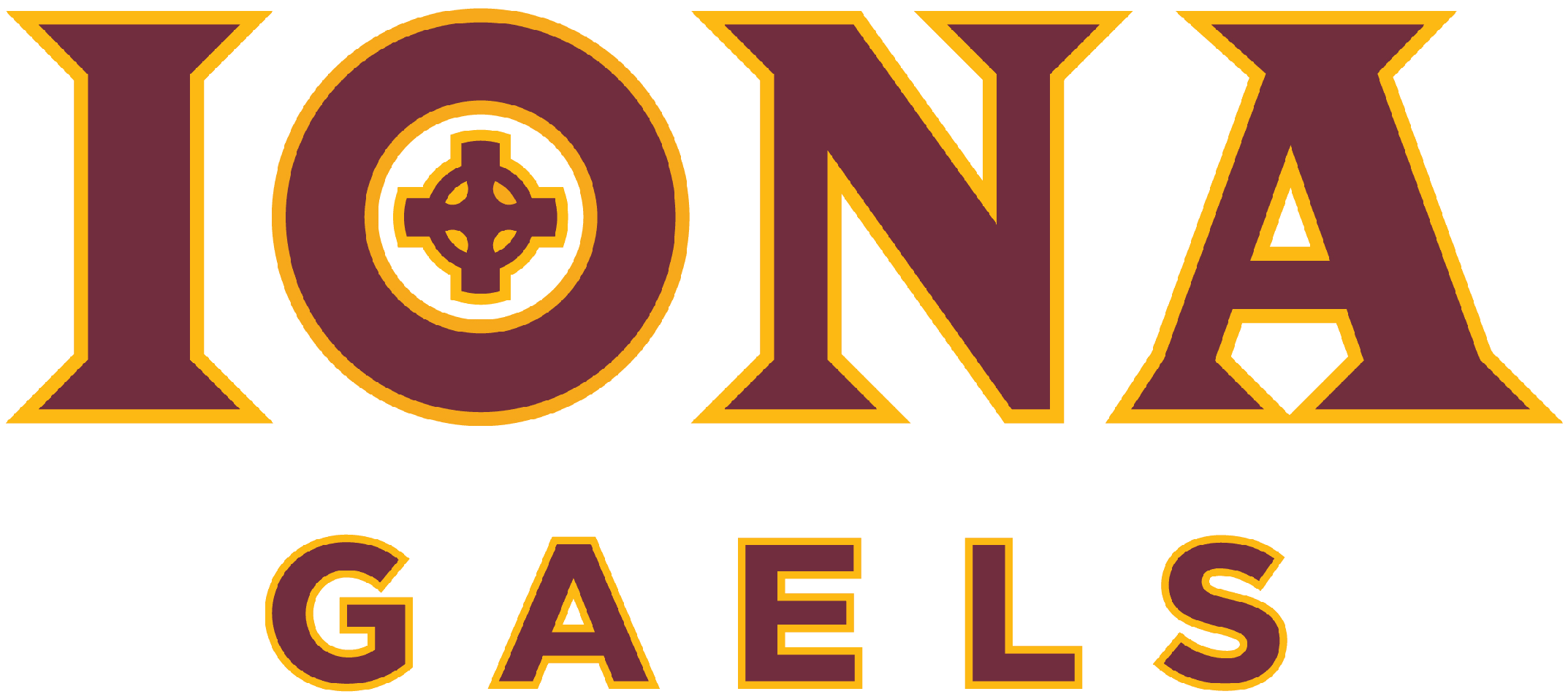

MAAC tournament champions

NCAA tournament, first round
- Conference: Metro Atlantic Athletic Conference
- Record: 20–14 (11–7 MAAC)
- Head coach: Tim Cluess (8th season)
- Assistant coaches: Jared Grasso; Eric Eaton; Adam Ginsburg
- Home arena: Hynes Athletic Center

2017–18 MAAC men's basketball standings
| | Conf. | | | | Overall |
| Team | W | | L | PCT | W | | L | PCT |
|---|---|---|---|---|---|---|---|---|
| Rider | 15 | – | 3 | .833 | 22 | – | 10 | .688 |
| Canisius | 15 | – | 3 | .833 | 21 | – | 12 | .636 |
| Niagara | 12 | – | 6 | .667 | 19 | – | 14 | .576 |
| Iona † | 11 | – | 7 | .611 | 20 | – | 14 | .588 |
| Manhattan | 9 | – | 9 | .500 | 14 | – | 17 | .452 |
| Fairfield | 9 | – | 9 | .500 | 17 | – | 16 | .515 |
| Quinnipiac | 7 | – | 11 | .389 | 12 | – | 21 | .364 |
| Monmouth | 7 | – | 11 | .389 | 11 | – | 20 | .355 |
| Saint Peter's | 6 | – | 12 | .333 | 14 | – | 18 | .438 |
| Siena | 4 | – | 14 | .222 | 8 | – | 24 | .250 |
| Marist | 4 | – | 14 | .222 | 6 | – | 25 | .194 |
† 2018 MAAC tournament winner

The 2017–18 Iona Gaels men's basketball team represented Iona College during the 2017–18 NCAA Division I men's basketball season. The Gaels, led by eighth-year head coach Tim Cluess, played their home games at the Hynes Athletic Center in New Rochelle, New York as members of the Metro Atlantic Athletic Conference (MAAC). They finished the season 20–14, 11–7 in MAAC play, to finish in fourth place. As the No. 4 seed in the 2018 MAAC tournament, they defeated Manhattan, Saint Peter's and Fairfield, to become champions of the MAAC tournament for the third consecutive time. They earned the MAAC's automatic bid to the NCAA tournament, where they lost in the first round to Duke, 89–67.

== Previous season ==
The Gaels finished the 2016–17 season 22–13, 12–8 in MAAC play, to finish in a tie for third place. In the 2017 MAAC tournament, they defeated Rider, Saint Peter's and Siena win the tournament championship for the second season in a row. As a result, they received the MAAC's automatic bid to the 2017 NCAA tournament as the No. 14 seed in the Midwest region. There, they lost in the first round to Oregon, 93–77.

== Roster ==
2017–18 Iona Gaels men's basketball team
Players
Coaches

| Pos. | # | Name | Height | Weight | Year | Previous school | Hometown |
|---|---|---|---|---|---|---|---|
| G | 0 | Rickey McGill | 6 ft 1 in (1.85 m) | 175 lb (79 kg) | Jr | Spring Valley | Spring Valley, NY |
| G | 1 | Zach Lewis | 6 ft 3 in (1.91 m) | 185 lb (84 kg) | GS | Northwest Catholic | Windsor, CT |
| G/F | 2 | E.J. Crawford | 6 ft 6 in (1.98 m) | 210 lb (95 kg) | So | Simsbury | Hartford, CT |
| G | 3 | C.J. Seaforth | 6 ft 1 in (1.85 m) | 155 lb (70 kg) | Fr | Hamden | Hamden, CT |
| G | 4 | Schadrac Casimir | 5 ft 10 in (1.78 m) | 165 lb (75 kg) | Jr | Trinity Catholic (CT) | Stamford, CT |
| F | 10 | Andrija Ristanovic | 6 ft 10 in (2.08 m) | 200 lb (91 kg) | Fr | Hillcrest Prep Academy (AZ) | Belgrade, Serbia |
| F | 11 | Roland Griffin | 6 ft 7 in (2.01 m) | 215 lb (98 kg) | Jr | West Aurora | Aurora, IL |
| G | 12 | Nils Taylor | 6 ft 2 in (1.88 m) | 195 lb (88 kg) | So | Rio Mesa | Somis, CA |
| F | 13 | TK Edogi | 6 ft 8 in (2.03 m) | 220 lb (100 kg) | GS | Valley Vista (AZ) | Phoenix, AZ |
| G | 15 | Deyshonee Much | 6 ft 5 in (1.96 m) | 180 lb (82 kg) | Sr | Redemption Christian Academy (MA) | Rochester, NY |
| G/F | 20 | Jan Svandrlik | 6 ft 7 in (2.01 m) | 210 lb (95 kg) | GS | Canarias Basketball Academy | Plzeň, Czech Republic |
| F | 21 | Gavin Kensmil | 6 ft 7 in (2.01 m) | 230 lb (104 kg) | Fr | Canarias Basketball Academy | Paramaribo, Suriname |
| G/F | 22 | Isaiah Still | 6 ft 6 in (1.98 m) | 190 lb (86 kg) | Jr | Union Catholic Regional | Rahway, NJ |
| F | 30 | Branden Aughburns | 6 ft 9 in (2.06 m) | 230 lb (104 kg) | Jr | Canterbury School (CT) | Flushing, NY |
| F | 44 | Tyrell Williams | 6 ft 9 in (2.06 m) | 250 lb (113 kg) | Jr | Miami Norland Senior | Miami, FL |

Head coach

- Tim Cluess (Hofstra)

Assistant coach(es)

- Jared Grasso (Quinnipiac)
- Eric Eaton (UMass–Dartmouth)
- Adam Ginsburg (Buffalo)

Legend

- (C) Team captain
- (S) Suspended
- (I) Ineligible
- (W) Walk-on
- Injured
- Current redshirt

Roster
Last update: 2024-04-01

== Schedule and results ==
| Date time, TV | Rank^{#} | Opponent^{#} | Result | Record | Site (attendance) city, state |
Non-conference regular season
| November 10, 2017*; 7:00 p.m., ESPN3 | | at Albany | L 67–69 | 0–1 | SEFCU Arena (3,529); Albany, NY |
| November 14, 2017*; 7:00 p.m., ACCN | | at Syracuse | L 62–71 | 0–2 | Carrier Dome (19,601); Syracuse, NY |
| November 17, 2017*; 8:00 p.m. | | vs. Weber State; Islands of the Bahamas Showcase quarterfinals | W 80–72 | 1–2 | Kendal Isaacs Gymnasium (316); Freeport, Bahamas |
| November 18, 2017*; 8:00 p.m. | | vs. Northern Kentucky; Islands of the Bahamas Showcase semifinals | L 72–85 | 1–3 | Kendal Isaacs Gymnasium (417); Freeport, Bahamas |
| November 19, 2017*; 5:00 p.m. | | vs. Coastal Carolina; Islands of the Bahamas Showcase 3rd-place game | L 84–89 | 1–4 | Kendal Isaacs Gymnasium (312); Freeport, Grand Bahama |
| November 28, 2017*; 7:00 p.m., ESPN3 | | at Ohio | W 93–88 | 2–4 | Convocation Center (4,383); Athens, OH |
| December 2, 2017*; 1:00 p.m., ESPN3 | | Fairleigh Dickinson | W 82–75 | 3–4 | Hynes Athletic Center (1,500); New Rochelle, NY |
| December 9, 2017*; 4:00 p.m., ESPN3 | | at NJIT | W 74–70 | 4–4 | Wellness and Events Center (460); Newark, NJ |
| December 12, 2017*; 7:00 p.m., ESPN3 | | Yale | W 83–67 | 5–4 | Hynes Athletic Center (1,553); New Rochelle, NY |
| December 17, 2017*; 4:30 p.m., FS1 | | at St. John's | L 59–69 | 5–5 | Madison Square Garden (9,515); New York, NY |
| December 19, 2017*; 7:00 p.m. | | at Holy Cross | W 82–68 | 6–5 | Hart Center (1,054); Worcester, MA |
| December 21, 2017*; 7:00 p.m. | | at Rhode Island | L 74–80 | 6–6 | Ryan Center (4,381); Kingston, RI |
MAAC regular season
| December 29, 2017; 7:00 p.m. | | at Niagara | W 98–93 ^{OT} | 7–6 (1–0) | Gallagher Center (966); Lewiston, NY |
| December 31, 2017; 1:00 p.m., ESPN3 | | at Canisius | L 78–85 | 7–7 (1–1) | Koessler Athletic Center (969); Buffalo, NY |
| January 5, 2018; 7:00 p.m., ESPNU | | Saint Peter's | W 73–69 | 8–7 (2–1) | Hynes Athletic Center (1,376); New Rochelle, NY |
| January 7, 2018; 1:00 p.m., ESPN3 | | Fairfield | W 84–65 | 9–7 (3–1) | Hynes Athletic Center (1,749); New Rochelle, NY |
| January 11, 2018; 7:00 p.m., ESPN3 | | Siena | W 71–69 | 10–7 (4–1) | Hynes Athletic Center (1,639); New Rochelle, NY |
| January 14, 2018; 1:00 p.m., ESPN3 | | Rider | W 91–64 | 11–7 (5–1) | Hynes Athletic Center (1,193); New Rochelle, NY |
| January 19, 2018; 7:00 p.m., ESPN3 | | at Monmouth | W 76–73 | 12–7 (6–1) | OceanFirst Bank Center (3,020); West Long Branch, NJ |
| January 21, 2018; 1:00 p.m., ESPN3 | | Canisius | L 82–84 | 12–8 (6–2) | Hynes Athletic Center (1,567); New Rochelle, NY |
| January 27, 2018; 7:00 p.m., ESPN3 | | vs. Manhattan; MAAC Tripleheader | W 78–65 | 13–8 (7–2) | Nassau Veterans Memorial Coliseum (2,545); Uniondale, NY |
| January 29, 2018; 7:00 p.m., ESPN3 | | at Fairfield | L 100–103 ^{OT} | 13–9 (7–3) | Webster Bank Arena (1,179); Bridgeport, CT |
| February 2, 2018; 7:00 p.m., ESPN3 | | Quinnipiac | W 87–82 ^{2OT} | 14–9 (8–3) | Hynes Athletic Center (1,857); New Rochelle, NY |
| February 4, 2018; 12:00 p.m., ESPN3 | | at Marist | W 98–64 | 15–9 (9–3) | McCann Field House (1,145); Poughkeepsie, NY |
| February 8, 2018; 7:00 p.m., ESPN3 | | Monmouth | L 50–72 | 15–10 (9–4) | Hynes Athletic Center (1,371); New Rochelle, NY |
| February 10, 2018; 12:00 p.m. | | at Saint Peter's | W 86–77 | 16–10 (10–4) | Yanitelli Center (745); Jersey City, NJ |
| February 12, 2018; 7:00 p.m., ESPN3 | | at Siena | L 78–82 ^{OT} | 16–11 (10–5) | Times Union Center (5,773); Albany, NY |
| February 16, 2018; 7:00 p.m., ESPN3 | | Niagara | L 84–85 | 16–12 (10–6) | Hynes Athletic Center (1,797); New Rochelle, NY |
| February 23, 2018; 7:00 p.m., ESPN3 | | Manhattan | W 88–75 | 17–12 (11–6) | Hynes Athletic Center (2,411); New Rochelle, NY |
| February 25, 2018; 2:00 p.m. | | at Rider | L 101–110 | 17–13 (11–7) | Alumni Gymnasium (1,650); Lawrenceville, NJ |
MAAC tournament
| March 3, 2018; 9:30 p.m., ESPN3 | (4) | vs. (5) Manhattan; Quarterfinals | W 72–60 | 18–13 | Times Union Center (2,630); Albany, NY |
| March 4, 2018; 7:00 p.m., ESPN3 | (4) | vs. (9) Saint Peter's; Semifinals | W 65–62 | 19–13 | Times Union Center (2,151); Albany, NY |
| March 5, 2018; 7:00 p.m., ESPN | (4) | vs. (6) Fairfield; Championship | W 83–71 | 20–13 | Times Union Center (3,329); Albany, NY |
NCAA tournament
| March 15, 2018*; 2:45 p.m., CBS | (15 MW) | vs. (2 MW) No. 9 Duke; First round | L 67–89 | 20–14 | PPG Paints Arena (18,757); Pittsburgh, PA |
*Non-conference game. ^{#}Rankings from AP poll. (#) Tournament seedings in parentheses. MW=Midwest. All times are in Eastern.
