= 2017–18 Monmouth Hawks men's basketball team =

American college basketball season

2017–18 Monmouth Hawks men's basketball
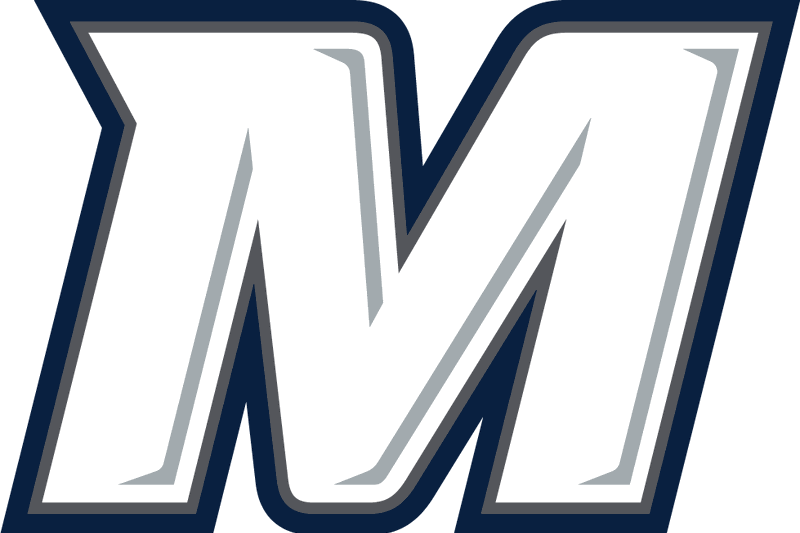
- Conference: Metro Atlantic Athletic Conference
- Record: 11–20 (7–11 MAAC)
- Head coach: King Rice (7th season)
- Assistant coaches: Rick Callahan; Duane Woodward; Jamal Meeks
- Home arena: OceanFirst Bank Center

2017–18 MAAC men's basketball standings
	Conf.				Overall
Team	W		L	PCT	W		L	PCT
Rider	15	–	3	.833	22	–	10	.688
Canisius	15	–	3	.833	21	–	12	.636
Niagara	12	–	6	.667	19	–	14	.576
Iona †	11	–	7	.611	20	–	14	.588
Manhattan	9	–	9	.500	14	–	17	.452
Fairfield	9	–	9	.500	17	–	16	.515
Quinnipiac	7	–	11	.389	12	–	21	.364
Monmouth	7	–	11	.389	11	–	20	.355
Saint Peter's	6	–	12	.333	14	–	18	.438
Siena	4	–	14	.222	8	–	24	.250
Marist	4	–	14	.222	6	–	25	.194
† 2018 MAAC tournament winner

The 2017–18 Monmouth Hawks men's basketball team represented Monmouth University during the 2017–18 NCAA Division I men's basketball season. The Hawks, led by seventh-year head coach King Rice, played their home games at OceanFirst Bank Center as members of the Metro Atlantic Athletic Conference. They finished the season 11–20 overall, 7–11 in MAAC play to finish in a tie for seventh place. As the No. 8 seed in the MAAC tournament, they were defeated in the first round by Saint Peter's.

== Previous season ==
The Hawks finished the season 27–7, 18–2 in MAAC play to win the regular season championship, their second consecutive conference title. As the No. 1 seed in the MAAC tournament, they defeated Niagara before losing to Siena in the semifinals. As a regular season conference champions who did not win their conference tournament, Monmouth received an automatic bid the National Invitation Tournament. As a No. 4 seed, they lost to Ole Miss in the first round.

== Roster ==
2017–18 Monmouth Hawks men's basketball team
Players
Coaches

Pos.	#	Name	Height	Weight	Year	Hometown
F	1	Pierre Sarr	6 ft 8 in (2.03 m)	195 lb (88 kg)	Jr	Dakar, Senegal
G	5	Ray Salnave	6 ft 3 in (1.91 m)	205 lb (93 kg)	RS Fr	Elmont, NY
G	10	Micah Seaborn	6 ft 5 in (1.96 m)	190 lb (86 kg)	RS Jr	Fort Worth, TX
F	14	Mustapha Traore	6 ft 8 in (2.03 m)	210 lb (95 kg)	RS So	Philadelphia, PA
G	15	Daniel Pillari	5 ft 10 in (1.78 m)	170 lb (77 kg)	Sr	Oceanport, NJ
G	23	Austin Tilghman	6 ft 1 in (1.85 m)	230 lb (104 kg)	Sr	Wilmington, DE
G	24	Louie Pillari	6 ft 6 in (1.98 m)	200 lb (91 kg)	RS So	Tinton Falls, NJ
F	32	Diago Quinn	6 ft 9 in (2.06 m)	255 lb (116 kg)	Jr	New York City, NY
C	33	Zac Tillman	6 ft 10 in (2.08 m)	280 lb (127 kg)	RS Sr	Yeadon, PA
F	44	Sam Ibiezugbe	6 ft 11 in (2.11 m)	245 lb (111 kg)	So	Simsbury, CT
G		Deion Hammond	6 ft 4 in (1.93 m)	200 lb (91 kg)	Fr	Mitchellville, MD
F		Melik Martin	6 ft 6 in (1.98 m)	200 lb (91 kg)	Fr	York, PA
G		Marcus McClary	6 ft 3 in (1.91 m)	195 lb (88 kg)	Fr	Linden, NJ
G		George Papas	6 ft 5 in (1.96 m)	175 lb (79 kg)	Fr	Jersey City, NJ
G		Nick Rutherford	6 ft 3 in (1.91 m)	185 lb (84 kg)	Jr	Indianapolis, IN

Head coach

- King Rice (North Carolina)

Assistant coach(es)

- Rick Callahan (Salem International)
- Duane Woodward (Boston College)
- Jamal Meeks (Indiana)

Legend

- (C) Team captain
- (S) Suspended
- (I) Ineligible
- (W) Walk-on
- Injured
- Current redshirt

Roster
Last update: August 31, 2017

== Schedule and results ==
Date time, TV	Rank^{#}	Opponent^{#}	Result	Record	Site (attendance) city, state
Non-conference regular season
Nov 10, 2017*; 8:30 p.m., ESPN3		Bucknell	W 79–78	1–0	OceanFirst Bank Center (3,159); West Long Branch, NJ
Nov 12, 2017*; 1:30 p.m., FS1		at No. 23 Seton Hall; NIT Season Tip-Off	L 65–75	1–1	Prudential Center (7,139); Newark, NJ
Nov 14, 2017*; 7:00 p.m.		at Lehigh	W 80–72	2–1	Stabler Arena (779); Bethlehem, PA
Nov 19, 2017*; 1:00 p.m., RSN		at Virginia; NIT Season Tip-Off	L 53–73	2–2	John Paul Jones Arena (13,472); Charlottesville, VA
Nov 22, 2017*; 7:00 p.m.		at UNC Asheville; NIT Season Tip-Off	L 51–62	2–3	Kimmel Arena (1,008); Asheville, NC
Nov 25, 2017*; 7:00 p.m., ESPN3		Penn	L 96–101 ^{4OT}	2–4	OceanFirst Bank Center (2,425); West Long Branch, NJ
Nov 27, 2017*; 7:00 p.m., ESPN3		Albany	W 81–73	3–4	OceanFirst Bank Center (1,557); West Long Branch, NJ
Dec 2, 2017*; 4:00 p.m., SNY		at UConn	L 81–84 ^{OT}	3–5	XL Center (6,582); Hartford, CT
Dec 6, 2017*; 7:00 p.m.		Hofstra	L 84–85	3–6	OceanFirst Bank Center (2,012); West Long Branch, NJ
Dec 9, 2017*; 12:00 p.m., ESPNU		vs. Kentucky; Citi Double Cash Classic	L 76–93	3–7	Madison Square Garden (10,438); New York City, NY
Dec 12, 2017*; 7:00 p.m.		at Princeton	L 58–69	3–8	Jadwin Gymnasium (1,549); Princeton, NJ
Dec 22, 2017*; 7:00 p.m.		at Yale	W 85–64	4–8	John J. Lee Amphitheater (1,006); New Haven, CT
MAAC regular season
Dec 28, 2017; 7:30 p.m., ESPN3		at Quinnipiac	L 76–78	4–9 (0–1)	TD Bank Sports Center (1,897); Hamden, CT
Dec 31, 2017; 12:00 p.m.		at Saint Peter's	L 64–77	4–10 (0–2)	Yanitelli Center (580); Jersey City, NJ
Jan 5, 2018; 7:00 p.m., ESPN3		Manhattan	W 77–66	5–10 (1–2)	OceanFirst Bank Center (2,506); West Long Branch, NJ
Jan 12, 2018; 7:00 p.m.		at Niagara	L 77–78	5–11 (1–3)	Gallagher Center (949); Lewiston, NY
Jan 14, 2018; 2:00 p.m., ESPN3		at Canisius	L 79–94	5–12 (1–4)	Koessler Athletic Center (1,136); Buffalo, NY
Jan 19, 2018; 7:00 p.m., ESPN3		Iona	L 73–76	5–13 (1–5)	OceanFirst Bank Center (3,020); West Long Branch, NJ
Jan 25, 2018; 7:00 p.m., ESPN3		Siena	W 67–56	6–13 (2–5)	OceanFirst Bank Center (2,005); West Long Branch, NJ
Jan 27, 2018; 4:00 p.m.		vs. Marist; MAAC Tripleheader	W 91–78	7–13 (3–5)	Nassau Veterans Memorial Coliseum (2,545); Uniondale, NY
Jan 29, 2018; 7:00 p.m.		at Rider	L 85–92	7–14 (3–6)	Alumni Gymnasium (1,650); Lawrenceville, NJ
Feb 2, 2018; 7:00 p.m., ESPN3		Fairfield	L 78–79	7–15 (3–7)	OceanFirst Bank Center (2,955); West Long Branch, NJ
Feb 4, 2018; 2:00 p.m., ESPN3		Niagara	L 91–96	7–16 (3–8)	OceanFirst Bank Center (2,080); West Long Branch, NJ
Feb 8, 2018; 7:00 p.m., ESPN3		at Iona	W 72–50	8–16 (4–8)	Hynes Athletic Center (1,371); New Rochelle, NY
Feb 10, 2018; 7:00 p.m., ESPN3		at Manhattan	L 76–93	8–17 (4–9)	Draddy Gymnasium (1,109); Riverdale, NY
Feb 13, 2018; 7:00 p.m., ESPN3		Saint Peter's	W 73–57	9–17 (5–9)	OceanFirst Bank Center (1,716); West Long Branch, NJ
Feb 16, 2018; 7:00 p.m., ESPN3		Canisius	L 60–78	9–18 (5–10)	OceanFirst Bank Center (2,854); West Long Branch, NJ
Feb 18, 2018; 2:00 p.m., ESPN3		at Siena	W 93–89 ^{3OT}	10–18 (6–10)	Times Union Center (7,244); Albany, NY
Feb 22, 2018; 7:00 p.m., ESPN3		Rider	W 91–77	11–18 (7–10)	OceanFirst Bank Center (2,110); West Long Branch, NJ
Feb 24, 2018; 1:00 p.m., ESPN3		at Fairfield	L 66–69	11–19 (7–11)	Webster Bank Arena (1,341); Fairfield, CT
MAAC tournament
Mar 1, 2018; 5:00 p.m., ESPN3	(8)	vs. (9) Saint Peter's; First round	L 58–60	11–20	Times Union Center; Albany, NY
*Non-conference game. ^{#}Rankings from AP Poll. (#) Tournament seedings in parentheses. All times are in Eastern Time Source.
