= 2017–18 Metro Atlantic Athletic Conference men's basketball season =

- League: NCAA Division I
- Sport: Basketball
- Duration: November 10, 2017-March 15, 2018
- Teams: 11

2018–19 NCAA Division I men's basketball season
- Regular season co-champions: Rider Broncs & Canisius Golden Griffins
- Runners-up: Niagara Purple Eagles
- Season MVP: Jermaine Crumpton (Canisius) & Kahlil Dukes (Niagara)
- Top scorer: Tyler Nelson (Fairfield) 22.2

Tournament
- Champions: Iona Gaels
- Runners-up: Fairfield Stags
- Finals MVP: Zach Lewis (Iona)

Metro Atlantic Athletic Conference men's basketball seasons
- ← 2016–17 2018–19 →

2017–18 MAAC men's basketball standings
	Conf.				Overall
Team	W		L	PCT	W		L	PCT
Rider	15	–	3	.833	22	–	10	.688
Canisius	15	–	3	.833	21	–	12	.636
Niagara	12	–	6	.667	19	–	14	.576
Iona †	11	–	7	.611	20	–	14	.588
Manhattan	9	–	9	.500	14	–	17	.452
Fairfield	9	–	9	.500	17	–	16	.515
Quinnipiac	7	–	11	.389	12	–	21	.364
Monmouth	7	–	11	.389	11	–	20	.355
Saint Peter's	6	–	12	.333	14	–	18	.438
Siena	4	–	14	.222	8	–	24	.250
Marist	4	–	14	.222	6	–	25	.194
† 2018 MAAC tournament winner

The 2017–18 Metro Atlantic Athletic Conference (MAAC) men's basketball season began with practices in October 2017, followed by the start of the 2017–18 NCAA Division I men's basketball season on November 10. Conference play started in January and concluded on March 15, 2018. This was the 37th season of MAAC basketball.

On February 25, 2018, the last day of the MAAC regular season, both Rider and Canisius won their final game to claim a share of the MAAC Regular Season title. Rider and Canisius both split their regular season games, but Rider had a 1–0 record against third place Niagara and Canisius went 1–1, so Rider was awarded the No. 1 seed in the 2018 MAAC tournament, while Canisius secured the No. 2 seed.

The 2018 MAAC Tournament was held from March 1–5, 2018 at the Times Union Center in Albany, NY. No. 4 seed Iona defeated No. 6 seed Fairfield 83–71 to win the tournament championship, their third consecutive. They joined former member La Salle University (1988–90) and Siena College (2008–10) as the only teams to ever win three consecutive tournament championships. No team has won four consecutive as of 2018. As a result, Iona received the conference's automatic bid to the NCAA tournament. They earned a No. 15 seed and lost to No. 2 seed Duke 67–89 in the first round. Rider, a conference champion who failed to win its conference's tournament, received a bid to the National Invitation Tournament, losing 86–99 at Oregon. Canisius was invited to play in the College Basketball Invitational, and lost at home to Jacksonville State 78–80^{OT} in the first round. Niagara was invited to the CollegeInsider.com Tournament, and lost at Eastern Michigan 65–83.

== Head coaches ==
=== Coaching changes ===
On March 7, 2017, head coach Tom Moore was fired. He finished at Quinnipiac with a ten-year record of 162–146. On March 27, Villanova assistant coach Baker Dunleavy was hired as the Bobcats next head coach.

=== Coaches ===
Team	Head coach	Previous job	Year at school	Overall record	MAAC record	MAAC Tournament championships
Canisius	Reggie Witherspoon	Chattanooga (asst.)	2	18–16	10–10	0
Fairfield	Sydney Johnson	Princeton	7	90–109	53–63	0
Iona	Tim Cluess	LIU Post	8	162–78	101–33	3
Manhattan	Steve Masiello	Louisville (asst.)	7	102–93	63–53	2
Marist	Mike Maker	Williams College	4	22–72	14–46	0
Monmouth	King Rice	Vanderbilt (asst.)	7	106–92	53–27	0
Niagara	Chris Casey	LIU Post	5	32–96	21–59	0
Quinnipiac	Baker Dunleavy	Villanova (asst.)	1	0–0	0–0	0
Rider	Kevin Baggett	Rider (assoc. HC)	6	85–79	54–44	0
Saint Peter's	John Dunne	Seton Hall (asst.)	12	139–207	86–120	1
Siena	Jimmy Patsos	Loyola (MD)	5	69–68	43–37	1

Notes:

- All records, appearances, titles, etc. are from time with current school only.
- Year at school includes 2017–18 season.
- Overall and MAAC records are from time at current school and are before the beginning of the season.
- Previous jobs are head coaching jobs unless otherwise noted.

== Preseason ==
=== Preseason Coaches Poll ===
Rank	Team
1.	Iona (9)
2.	Manhattan (2)
3.	Monmouth
4.	Fairfield
5.	Niagara
6.	Siena
7.	Rider
8.	Saint Peter's
9.	Canisius
10.	Marist
11.	Quinnipiac

() first place votes

=== Preseason All-MAAC teams ===
2017-18 MAAC Men's Basketball Preseason All-MAAC Teams
First Team	Second Team	Third Team
Jermaine Crumpton – Canisius; †Tyler Nelson – Fairfield; Zane Waterman – Manhattan; †Micha Seaborn – Monmouth; Matt Scott – Niagara	Rickey McGill – Iona; Deyshonee Much – Iona; Rich Williams – Manhattan; Kahlil Dukes – Niagara; Nico Clareth – Siena	Zavier Turner – Manhattan; Brian Parker – Marist; Chaise Daniels – Quinnipiac; Stevie Jordan – Rider; Nick Griffin – Saint Peter's

† denotes unanimous selection

=== Preseason Player of the Year ===
Recipient	School
Tyler Nelson	Fairfield

== MAAC regular season ==
=== Conference matrix ===
This table summarizes the final head-to-head results between teams in conference play.

	Canisius	Fairfield	Iona	Manhattan	Marist	Monmouth	Niagara	Quinnipiac	Rider	Saint Peter's	Siena
vs. Canisius	–	0–1	0–2	0–1	0–2	0–2	1–1	0–2	1–1	0–2	1–1
vs. Fairfield	1–0	–	1–1	2–0	1–1	0–2	1–1	1–1	2–0	0–1	0–2
vs. Iona	2–0	1–1	–	0–2	0–1	1–1	1–1	0–1	1–1	0–2	1–1
vs. Manhattan	1–0	0–2	2–0	–	1–1	1–1	1–1	1–1	2–0	0–1	0–2
vs. Marist	2–0	1–1	1–0	1–1	–	1–0	2–0	2–0	2–0	1–1	1–1
vs. Monmouth	2–0	2–0	1–1	1–1	0–1	–	2–0	1–0	1–1	1–1	0–2
vs. Niagara	1–1	1–1	1–1	1–1	0–2	0–2	–	0–2	1–0	1–1	0–1
vs. Quinnipiac	2–0	1–1	1–0	1–1	0–2	0–1	2–0	–	2–0	2–0	0–2
vs. Rider	1–1	0–2	1–1	0–2	0–2	1–1	0–1	0–2	–	0–2	0–1
vs. Saint Peter's	2–0	1–0	2–0	1–0	1–1	1–1	1–1	0–2	2–0	–	1–1
vs. Siena	1–1	2–0	1–1	2–0	1–1	2–0	1–0	2–0	1–0	1–1	–
Total	15–3	9–9	11–7	9–9	4–14	7–11	12–6	7–11	15–3	6–12	4–14

=== Player of the week ===
Throughout the regular season, the Metro Atlantic Athletic Conference offices named player(s) of the week and rookie(s) of the week.

Week	Player of the week	Rookie of the week
November 13, 2017	Tyler Nelson, Fairfield	Wassef Methnani, Fairfield
November 20, 2017	Isaiah Reese, Canisius	Jordan Allen, Rider
November 27, 2017	Matt Scott, Niagara	Jordan Allen (2), Rider
December 4, 2017	Matt Scott (2), Niagara	Jordan Allen (3), Rider
December 11, 2017	Kahlil Dukes, Niagara	Rich Kelly, Quinnipiac
December 18, 2017	Matt Scott (3), Niagara	Roman Penn, Siena
December 26, 2017	Austin Tilghman, Monmouth	Rich Kelly (2), Quinnipiac
January 2, 2018	Jermaine Crumpton, Canisius	Takal Molson, Canisius
January 8, 2018	Frederick Scott, Rider	Deion Hammond, Monmouth
January 15, 2018	Kahlil Dukes (2), Niagara	Takal Molson (2), Canisius
January 22, 2018	Isaiah Reese (2), Canisius	Aidas Kavaliauskas, Fairfield
January 29, 2018	Austin Tilghman (2), Monmouth	Deion Hammond (2), Monmouth
February 5, 2018	Tyler Nelson (2), Fairfield	Takal Molson (3), Canisius
February 12, 2018	Dimencio Vaughn, Rider	Jordan Allen (4), Rider
February 19, 2018	Dimencio Vaughn (2), Rider	Rich Kelly (3), Quinnipiac
February 26, 2018	Isaiah Reese (3), Canisius	Takal Molson (4), Canisius

=== Records against other conferences ===
2017–18 records against non-conference foes. Records shown for regular season only.

Power 7 Conferences	Record
American	0–4
ACC	0–4
Big East	0–6
Big Ten	1–4
Big 12	0–1
Pac-12	0–2
SEC	0–1
Power 7 Total	1–22
Other NCAA Division I Conferences	Record
America East	4–8
A-10	3–6
ASUN	1–3
Big Sky	1–0
Big South	1–2
Big West	1–0
CAA	3–7
C-USA	0–1
Horizon League	2–2
Ivy League	8–4
MAC	1–3
MEAC	4–0
MVC	0–2
Mountain West	0–1
NEC	11–3
OVC	0–2
Patriot League	9–6
Pacific West	0–0
SoCon	1–0
Southland	1–0
SWAC	2–0
The Summit	0–0
Sun Belt	1–3
WAC	0–1
WCC	0–2
Other Division I Total	54–56
NCAA Division I Total	55–78

== Postseason ==
=== MAAC Tournament ===
- 2018 Metro Atlantic Athletic Conference Basketball Tournament, Times Union Center, Albany, New York

First round Thursday, March 1 ESPN3
8	Monmouth	58
9	Saint Peter's	60
7	Quinnipiac	67
10	Siena	58
6	Fairfield	71
11	Marist	57

Quarterfinals; Friday/Saturday, March 2/3; ESPN3
1	Rider	55
9	Saint Peter's	66
4	Iona	72
5	Manhattan	60
2	Canisius	69
7	Quinnipiac	72
3	Niagara	77
6	Fairfield	90

Semifinals; Sunday, March 4 ESPN3/ESPNU
9	Saint Peter's	62
4	Iona	65
7	Quinnipiac	64
6	Fairfield	74

Championship; Monday, March 5 ESPN
4	Iona	83
6	Fairfield	71

* denotes number of overtimes

=== NCAA Tournament ===
Seed	Region	School	1st Round
15	Midwest	Iona	L 67–89 vs. (2) Duke – (Pittsburgh)

Game summary

CBS

March 15, 2018
2:45 p.m.

Recap

(2 MW) No. 9 Duke 89, (15 MW) Iona 67
Scoring by half: 53–39, 36–28
Pts: Bagley III – 22; Rebs: Carter Jr. – 8 Asts: Allen – 9 Duval – 19 pts, 8 ast	Pts: Griffin – 21; Rebs: Edogi – 9 Asts: Casimir – 6 McGill – 10 pts, 5 ast
NCAA tournament first round

PPG Paints Arena
Pittsburgh, PA
Attendance: 18,757
Referees: Chris Rastatter, Tim Comer, Courtney Green

=== National Invitation Tournament ===
Seed	Bracket	School	1st Round
6	Notre Dame	Rider	L 86–99 at No. 3 Oregon – (Eugene, OR)

Game summary

ESPN3

March 13, 2018
10:00 p.m.

Recap

(3) Oregon 99, (6) Rider 86
Scoring by quarter: 15–21, 21–23, 25–21, 38–21
Pts: Pritchard & Bailey Jr. – 23; Rebs: Wooten – 10; Asts: Pritchard – 8 E. Brown – 18 pts, 4 ast	Pts: Vaughn – 25; Rebs: Marshall – 8 Asts: Jordan – 6 Scott – 16 pts, 5 reb, 2 stl
NIT First Round

Matthew Knight Arena
Eugene, OR
Attendance: 2,327
Referees: Doran Gotschall, Klaus Endrissat, Nate Harris

=== College Basketball Invitational ===
School	1st Round
Canisius	L 78–80^{OT} vs. Jacksonville State – (Buffalo, NY)

Game summary

ESPN3

March 14, 2018
7:00 p.m.

BoxScore

Jacksonville State 80, Canisius 78 (OT)
Scoring by half: 37–33, 34–38 Overtime: 9–7
Pts: Drumwright – 20; Rebs: Giga – 11; Asts: Drumwright – 6 Burnell – 16 pts, 8 reb, 3 ast	Pts: Reese – 24; Rebs: Molson & Crumpton – 5 Asts: Molson – 5 Crumpton – 16 pts, 3 stl
CBI First Round

Koessler Athletic Center
Buffalo, NY
Attendance: 870
Referees: Ron Tyburski, Kevin O'Connell, Joseph Palacz

=== CollegeInsider.com Tournament ===
School	1st Round
Niagara	L 65–83 at Eastern Michigan – (Ypsilanti, MI)

Game summary

March 14, 2018
7:00 p.m.

BoxScore

Niagara 65, Eastern Michigan 83
Scoring by half: 27–42, 38–41
Pts: Dukes – 16; Rebs: Prochet – 11; Asts: Dukes – 4 Prochet – 12 pts, 3 ast	Pts: Minnie – 29; Rebs: Thompson IV – 16; Asts: Bond – 8 Bond – 11 pts, 12 reb
CIT First Round

Convocation Center
Ypsilanti, MI
Attendance: 1,138
Referees: Tim Stewart, Scott Siville, Ed Phillips

== Honors and awards ==
=== MAAC Awards ===
2017-18 MAAC Men's Basketball Major Individual Awards
Award	Recipient(s)
Co-Players of the Year	Jermaine Crumpton, Sr, F, Quinnipiac; Kahlil Dukes, Sr, G, Niagara
Coach of the Year	Kevin Baggett, Rider
Rookie of the Year	Takal Molson, Fr, G, Canisius
Defensive Player of the Year	Pauly Paulicap, So, F, Manhattan
Sixth Player of the Year	Frederick Scott, Fr, F, Rider

2017-18 MAAC Men's Basketball All-Conference Teams
First Team	Second Team	Third Team	Rookie Team
Jermaine Crumpton, Sr, F, Canisius; Tyler Nelson, Sr, G, Fairfield; Isaiah Reese, So, G, Canisius; †Kahlil Dukes, Sr, G, Niagara; Dimencio Vaughn, Fr, G/F, Rider	Rickey McGill, Jr, G, Iona; Stevie Jordan, So, G, Rider; Rich Williams, Sr, G, Manhattan; Matt Scott, Sr, G, Niagara; Cameron Young, Jr, G, Quinnipiac	Zane Waterman, Sr, F, Manhattan; Brian Parker, Jr, G, Marist; Frederick Scott, Fr, F, Rider; Austin Tilghman, Sr, G, Monmouth; Jordan Allen, Fr, G, Rider	Takal Molson, Fr, G, Canisius; Deion Hammond, Fr, G, Monmouth; Rich Kelly, Fr, G, Quinnipiac; Jordan Allen, Fr, G, Rider; Prince Oduro, Fr, G/F, Siena

† denotes unanimous selection
