= 2017–18 Manhattan Jaspers basketball team =

American college basketball season

2017–18 Manhattan Jaspers basketball
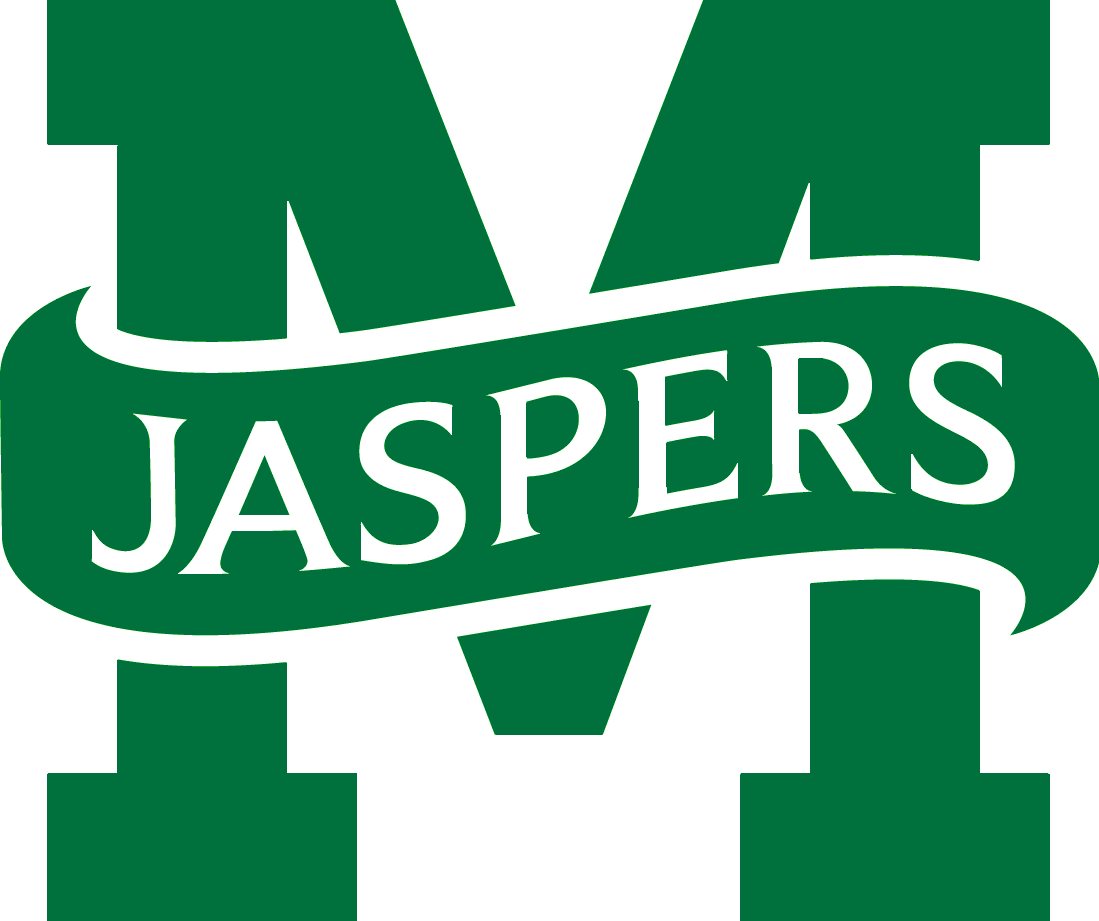
- Conference: Metro Atlantic Athletic Conference
- Record: 14–17 (9–9 MAAC)
- Head coach: Steve Masiello (7th season)
- Assistant coaches: Matt Grady; Shawn Finney; Michael Alvarado
- Home arena: Draddy Gymnasium

2017–18 MAAC men's basketball standings
	Conf.				Overall
Team	W		L	PCT	W		L	PCT
Rider	15	–	3	.833	22	–	10	.688
Canisius	15	–	3	.833	21	–	12	.636
Niagara	12	–	6	.667	19	–	14	.576
Iona †	11	–	7	.611	20	–	14	.588
Manhattan	9	–	9	.500	14	–	17	.452
Fairfield	9	–	9	.500	17	–	16	.515
Quinnipiac	7	–	11	.389	12	–	21	.364
Monmouth	7	–	11	.389	11	–	20	.355
Saint Peter's	6	–	12	.333	14	–	18	.438
Siena	4	–	14	.222	8	–	24	.250
Marist	4	–	14	.222	6	–	25	.194
† 2018 MAAC tournament winner

The 2017–18 Manhattan Jaspers basketball team represented Manhattan College during the 2017–18 NCAA Division I men's basketball season. The Jaspers, led by seventh-year head coach Steve Masiello, played their home games at Draddy Gymnasium in Riverdale, New York as members of the Metro Atlantic Athletic Conference (MAAC). They finished the season 14–17, 9–9 in MAAC play, to finish in a tie for fifth place. As the No. 5 seed in the MAAC tournament, they lost in the quarterfinals to Iona.

== Previous season ==
The Jaspers finished the 2016–17 season 10–22, 5–15 in MAAC play, to finish in a tie for tenth place. They lost in the first round of the MAAC tournament to Rider.

== Roster ==
2017–18 Manhattan Jaspers men's basketball team
Players
Coaches

Pos.	#	Name	Height	Weight	Year	Hometown
F	0	Warren Williams	6 ft 9 in (2.06 m)	240 lb (109 kg)	Fr	Kingston, Jamaica
G	2	Patrick Strzala	6 ft 4 in (1.93 m)	190 lb (86 kg)	Fr	Bayonne, NJ
G	3	Zavier Turner	5 ft 9 in (1.75 m)	175 lb (79 kg)	RS Sr	Indianapolis, IN
F	4	Zane Waterman	6 ft 9 in (2.06 m)	230 lb (104 kg)	Sr	Winston-Salem, NC
G	5	Jesse Boyce	6 ft 2 in (1.88 m)	190 lb (86 kg)	So	Thornwood, NY
G	10	Nehemiah Mack	6 ft 1 in (1.85 m)	190 lb (86 kg)	Fr	Harrisburg, PA
G	11	Aaron Jr. Walker	6 ft 2 in (1.88 m)	203 lb (92 kg)	So	Brooklyn, NY
F	14	Calvin Crawford	6 ft 9 in (2.06 m)	210 lb (95 kg)	RS Sr	Middletown, NY
G	21	Matt Maloney	6 ft 1 in (1.85 m)	180 lb (82 kg)	Jr	Somers, NY
G	22	Thomas Capuano	6 ft 0 in (1.83 m)	180 lb (82 kg)	Jr	Hastings-on-Hudson, NY
G	23	Rich Williams	6 ft 5 in (1.96 m)	190 lb (86 kg)	RS Sr	Brooklyn, NY
F	24	Ebube Ebube	6 ft 7 in (2.01 m)	220 lb (100 kg)	Fr	San Juan, Puerto Rico
F	32	Kevin Salis	6 ft 6 in (1.98 m)	210 lb (95 kg)	Fr	Cornwall, NY
F	33	Pauly Paulicap	6 ft 8 in (2.03 m)	220 lb (100 kg)	So	Elmont, NY
G	52	Samson Usilo	6 ft 4 in (1.93 m)	215 lb (98 kg)	RS Jr	Lagos, Nigeria

Head coach

- Steve Masiello (Kentucky)

Assistant coach(es)

- Matt Grady (Saint Joseph's)
- Shawn Finney (Fairmont State)
- Michael Alvarado (Manhattan)

Legend

- (C) Team captain
- (S) Suspended
- (I) Ineligible
- (W) Walk-on
- Injured
- Current redshirt

Roster
Last update: September 23, 2024

== Schedule and results ==
Date time, TV	Rank^{#}	Opponent^{#}	Result	Record	Site (attendance) city, state
Exhibition
November 3, 2017*; 8:00 p.m.		Sacred Heart; Hurricane Relief Charity Exhibition	L 71–81		Draddy Gymnasium; Riverdale, NY
November 8, 2017*; 7:00 p.m.		NYIT	W 117–72		Draddy Gymnasium; Riverdale, NY
Non-conference regular season
November 15, 2017*; 7:00 p.m.		St. Francis Brooklyn	W 80–79 ^{OT}	1–0	Draddy Gymnasium (1,018); Riverdale, NY
November 18, 2017*; 1:00 p.m., ESPN3		Harvard	W 73–69	2–0	Draddy Gymnasium (1,250); Riverdale, NY
November 20, 2017*; 11:00 a.m.		vs. UMKC; Gulf Coast Showcase quarterfinals	L 63–74	2–1	Germain Arena; Estero, FL
November 21, 2017*; 11:00 a.m.		vs. Missouri State; Gulf Coast Showcase consolation 2nd round	L 65–69	2–2	Germain Arena; Estero, FL
November 22, 2017*; 11:00 a.m.		vs. Northern Illinois; Gulf Coast Showcase 7th-place game	L 68–70	2–3	Germain Arena (868); Estero, FL
November 26, 2017*; 2:00 p.m.		at Fordham; Battle of the Bronx	L 57–70	2–4	Rose Hill Gymnasium (1,823); The Bronx, NY
December 1, 2017*; 11:30 a.m., CBSSN		vs. Holy Cross; Hall of Fame Belfast Classic semifinals	W 70–54	3–4	SSE Arena (5,256); Belfast, Northern Ireland
December 2, 2017*; 12:00 p.m., CBSSN		vs. Towson; Hall of Fame Belfast Classic	L 55–56	3–5	SSE Arena (3,882); Belfast, Northern Ireland
December 9, 2017*; 7:00 p.m.		Morgan State	W 80–66	4–5	Draddy Gymnasium (952); Riverdale, NY
December 16, 2017*; 7:00 p.m., ESPN3		at Tulsa	L 66–80	4–6	Reynolds Center (3,382); Tulsa, OK
December 20, 2017*; 7:00 p.m.		vs. Hofstra; Garden City Showcase	W 63–61	5–6	Adelphi's Center for Recreation and Sports (1,019); Garden City, NY
December 23, 2017*; 12:00 p.m., FSN		at No. 23 Seton Hall	L 62–74	5–7	Prudential Center (8,001); Newark, NJ
MAAC regular season
December 30, 2017; 7:00 p.m.		Fairfield	W 61–58	6–7 (1–0)	Draddy Gymnasium (1,523); Riverdale, NY
January 2, 2018; 7:00 p.m., ESPN3		at Marist	W 101–96 ^{OT}	7–7 (2–0)	McCann Field House (893); Poughkeepsie, NY
January 5, 2018; 7:00 p.m., ESPN3		at Monmouth	L 66–77	7–8 (2–1)	OceanFirst Bank Center (2,506); West Long Branch, NJ
January 7, 2018; 6:00 p.m.		Rider	L 76–82	7–9 (2–2)	Draddy Gymnasium (521); Riverdale, NY
January 11, 2018; 7:00 p.m., ESPN3		at Fairfield	W 59–53	8–9 (3–2)	Webster Bank Arena (1,214); Bridgeport, CT
January 13, 2018; 7:00 p.m.		Siena	W 72–61	9–9 (4–2)	Draddy Gymnasium (1,013); Riverdale, NY
January 19, 2018; 9:00 p.m., ESPNU		Canisius	L 59–68	9–10 (4–3)	Draddy Gymnasium (1,567); Riverdale, NY
January 21, 2018; 12:00 p.m.		at Saint Peter's	W 68–57	10–10 (5–3)	Yanitelli Center (726); Jersey City, NJ
January 24, 2018; 7:00 p.m.		at Niagara	L 63–72	10–11 (5–4)	Gallagher Center (1,058); Lewiston, NY
January 27, 2018; 7:00 p.m.		vs. Iona; MAAC Tripleheader	L 65–78	10–12 (5–5)	Nassau Veterans Memorial Coliseum (2,545); Uniondale, NY
January 30, 2018; 7:00 p.m.		Marist	L 59–62	10–13 (5–6)	Draddy Gymnasium (981); Riverdale, NY
February 2, 2018; 7:00 p.m.		at Siena	W 51–47	11–13 (6–6)	Times Union Center (7,372); Albany, NY
February 8, 2018; 7:00 p.m.		at Rider	L 73–77	11–14 (6–7)	Alumni Gymnasium (1,514); Lawrenceville, NJ
February 10, 2018; 7:00 p.m., ESPN3		Monmouth	W 93–76	12–14 (7–7)	Draddy Gymnasium (1,109); Riverdale, NY
February 15, 2018; 7:00 p.m., ESPN3		at Quinnipiac	L 70–71	12–15 (7–8)	TD Bank Sports Center (1,271); Hamden, CT
February 18, 2018; 2:00 p.m.		Niagara	W 82–72	13–15 (8–8)	Draddy Gymnasium (1,074); Riverdale, NY
February 23, 2018; 7:00 p.m., ESPN3		at Iona	L 75–88	13–16 (8–9)	Hynes Athletic Center (2,411); New Rochelle, NY
February 25, 2018; 6:00 p.m., ESPN3		Quinnipiac	W 92–86 ^{2OT}	14–16 (9–9)	Draddy Gymnasium (1,259); Riverdale, NY
MAAC tournament
March 3, 2018; 9:00 p.m., ESPN3	(5)	vs. (4) Iona; Quarterfinals	L 60–72	14–17	Times Union Center (2,630); Albany, NY
*Non-conference game. ^{#}Rankings from AP poll. (#) Tournament seedings in parentheses. All times are in Eastern.
