= 2018 MAAC men's basketball tournament =

- Classification: Division I
- Season: 2017–18
- Teams: 11
- Site: Times Union Center; Albany, New York
- Champions: Iona (11th title)
- Winning coach: Tim Cluess (4th title)
- MVP: Zach Lewis (Iona)
- Top scorer: Tyler Nelson (Fairfield) (100 points)
- Television: ESPN2, ESPNU, ESPN3

2017–18 MAAC men's basketball standings
	Conf.				Overall
Team	W		L	PCT	W		L	PCT
Rider	15	–	3	.833	22	–	10	.688
Canisius	15	–	3	.833	21	–	12	.636
Niagara	12	–	6	.667	19	–	14	.576
Iona †	11	–	7	.611	20	–	14	.588
Manhattan	9	–	9	.500	14	–	17	.452
Fairfield	9	–	9	.500	17	–	16	.515
Quinnipiac	7	–	11	.389	12	–	21	.364
Monmouth	7	–	11	.389	11	–	20	.355
Saint Peter's	6	–	12	.333	14	–	18	.438
Siena	4	–	14	.222	8	–	24	.250
Marist	4	–	14	.222	6	–	25	.194
† 2018 MAAC tournament winner

The 2018 Metro Atlantic Athletic Conference men's basketball tournament was the postseason men's basketball tournament for the Metro Atlantic Athletic Conference for the 2017–18 NCAA Division I men's basketball season. It was held from March 1–5, 2018 at the Times Union Center in Albany, New York. No. 4 seed Iona defeated No. 6 seed Fairfield in the championship game to receive the conference's automatic bid to the NCAA tournament. This was Iona's third consecutive MAAC tournament championship, while also being their MAAC-record leading sixth straight championship game appearance.

== Seeds ==
All 11 teams in the conference participated in the Tournament. The top five teams received byes to the quarterfinals. Teams were seeded by record within the conference, with a tiebreaker system to seed teams with identical conference records.

Seed	School	Conference	Tiebreaker
1	Rider	15–3	1–1 vs Canisius, 1–0 vs Niagara
2	Canisius	15–3	1–1 vs Rider, 1–1 vs Niagara
3	Niagara	12–6	
4	Iona	11–7	
5	Manhattan	9–9	2–0 vs Fairfield
6	Fairfield	9–9	0–2 vs Manhattan
7	Quinnipiac	7–11	1–0 vs Monmouth
8	Monmouth	7–11	0–1 vs Quinnipiac
9	Saint Peter's	6–12	
10	Siena	4–14	1–1 vs Marist, 1–2 vs Rider/Canisius
11	Marist	4–14	1–1 vs Siena, 0–4 vs Rider/Canisius

== Schedule ==
Session	Game	Time*	Matchup^{#}	Score	Television
First round – Thursday, March 1
1	1	5:00 pm	No. 8 Monmouth vs No. 9 Saint Peter's	58–60	ESPN3
1	2	7:30 pm	No. 7 Quinnipiac vs No. 10 Siena	67–58	ESPN3
1	3	10:00 pm	No. 6 Fairfield vs No. 11 Marist	71–57	ESPN3
Quarterfinals – Friday, March 2
2	4	7:00 pm	No. 1 Rider vs No. 9 Saint Peter's	55–66	ESPN3
2	5	9:30 pm	No. 2 Canisius vs. No. 7 Quinnipiac	69–72	ESPN3
Quarterfinals – Saturday, March 3
3	6	7:00 pm	No. 3 Niagara vs No. 6 Fairfield	77–90	ESPN3
3	7	9:30 pm	No. 4 Iona vs. No. 5 Manhattan	72–60	ESPN3
Semifinals – Sunday, March 4
4	8	7:00 pm	No. 4 Iona vs No. 9 Saint Peter's	65–62	ESPN3
4	9	9:30 pm	No. 6 Fairfield vs No. 7 Quinnipiac	74–64	ESPNU
Championship – Monday, March 5
5	10	7:00 pm	No. 4 Iona vs No. 6 Fairfield	83–71	ESPN
*Game times in ET. #-Rankings denote tournament seeding.

== Bracket ==
First round Thursday, March 1 ESPN3
8	Monmouth	58
9	Saint Peter's	60
7	Quinnipiac	67
10	Siena	58
6	Fairfield	71
11	Marist	57

Quarterfinals; Friday, March 2 ESPN3
1	Rider	55
9	Saint Peter's	66
4	Iona	72
5	Manhattan	60
2	Canisius	69
7	Quinnipiac	72
3	Niagara	77
6	Fairfield	90

Semifinals; Sunday, March 4 ESPN3/ESPNU
9	Saint Peter's	62
4	Iona	65
7	Quinnipiac	64
6	Fairfield	74

Championship; Monday, March 5 ESPN
4	Iona	83
6	Fairfield	71

== All-Championship Team ==
2018 MAAC Men's Basketball All-Championship Team
- Nick Griffin, Saint Peter's – 13.0 ppg, 3.7 rpg
- Cameron Young, Quinnipiac – 18.3 ppg, 9.7 rpg, 1.7 spg
- Tyler Nelson, Fairfield – 25.0 ppg, 5.5 rpg, 3.3 apg
- Jerome Segura, Fairfield – 5.8 ppg, 3.8 apg, 2.3 spg
- Schadrac Casimir, Iona – 15.7 ppg
- Roland Griffin, Iona – 13.0 ppg, 4.3 rpg, 1.3 bpg
- Zach Lewis^{MVP}, Iona – 18.3 ppg, 5.3 rpg, 3.3 apg

== See also ==
- 2018 MAAC women's basketball tournament
