= 2017–18 Siena Saints men's basketball team =

American college basketball season

2017–18 Siena Saints men's basketball
- Conference: Metro Atlantic Athletic Conference
- Record: 8–24 (4–14 MAAC)
- Head coach: Jimmy Patsos (5th season)
- Assistant coaches: Greg Manning; Jordan Watson; Abe Woldeslassie
- Home arena: Times Union Center

2017–18 MAAC men's basketball standings
	Conf.				Overall
Team	W		L	PCT	W		L	PCT
Rider	15	–	3	.833	22	–	10	.688
Canisius	15	–	3	.833	21	–	12	.636
Niagara	12	–	6	.667	19	–	14	.576
Iona †	11	–	7	.611	20	–	14	.588
Manhattan	9	–	9	.500	14	–	17	.452
Fairfield	9	–	9	.500	17	–	16	.515
Quinnipiac	7	–	11	.389	12	–	21	.364
Monmouth	7	–	11	.389	11	–	20	.355
Saint Peter's	6	–	12	.333	14	–	18	.438
Siena	4	–	14	.222	8	–	24	.250
Marist	4	–	14	.222	6	–	25	.194
† 2018 MAAC tournament winner

The 2017–18 Siena Saints men's basketball team represented Siena College during the 2017–18 NCAA Division I men's basketball season. The Saints, led by fifth-year head coach Jimmy Patsos, played their home games at the Times Union Center as members of the Metro Atlantic Athletic Conference. They finished the season 8–24 overall, 4–14 in MAAC play to finish in a tie for tenth place. As the No. 10 seed in the MAAC tournament, they lost in the first round to Quinnipiac.

On April 13, 2018, head coach Jimmy Patsos resigned amid an investigation regarding abusive conduct and financial improprieties within the program. On May 2, the Saints hired Mount St. Mary's head coach Jamion Christian for the job.

== Previous season ==
The Saints finished the 2016–17 season 17–17, 12–8 in MAAC play to finish in a tie for third place. They defeated Fairfield and Monmouth before losing in the championship game of the MAAC tournament to Iona.

== Roster ==
2017–18 Siena Saints men's basketball team
Players
Coaches

Pos.	#	Name	Height	Weight	Year	Hometown
G	2	Christian Bentley	6 ft 2 in (1.88 m)	204 lb (93 kg)	Fr	Brampton, ON
G/F	3	Manny Camper	6 ft 5 in (1.96 m)	208 lb (94 kg)	Fr	Worton, MD
G	5	Kadeem Smithen	6 ft 3 in (1.91 m)	170 lb (77 kg)	RS Jr	Ajax, ON
F	11	Thomas Huerter, Jr.	6 ft 7 in (2.01 m)	210 lb (95 kg)	So	Clifton Park, NY
G	12	Ben Diamond	5 ft 8 in (1.73 m)	145 lb (66 kg)	So	Loudonville, NY
G	13	Khalil Richard	6 ft 0 in (1.83 m)	179 lb (81 kg)	So	Baltimore, MD
G	15	Prince Oduro	6 ft 8 in (2.03 m)	253 lb (115 kg)	Fr	Toronto, ON
G	20	Roman Penn	5 ft 11 in (1.8 m)	170 lb (77 kg)	Fr	Calumet City, IL
G	21	Ahsante Shivers	6 ft 4 in (1.93 m)	206 lb (93 kg)	So	Seat Pleasant, MD
G	22	Paolo Morastoni (W)	6 ft 2 in (1.88 m)	190 lb (86 kg)	Jr	Blumenau, Brazil
G	23	Jordan Horn	6 ft 3 in (1.91 m)	196 lb (89 kg)	Fr	Saint Paul, MN
G	25	Nico Clareth	6 ft 5 in (1.96 m)	187 lb (85 kg)	Jr	Baltimore, MD
F	32	Evan Fisher	6 ft 8 in (2.03 m)	230 lb (104 kg)	Jr	Pasadena, MD
F	34	Kevin Degnan	6 ft 9 in (2.06 m)	215 lb (98 kg)	RS Jr	Pearl River, NY
F	35	Sammy Friday	6 ft 9 in (2.06 m)	243 lb (110 kg)	So	Jersey City, NJ

Head coach

- Jimmy Patsos (Catholic)

Assistant coach(es)

- Greg Manning (Loyola (MD))
- Jordan Watson (Augustana (IL))
- Abe Woldeslassie (Macalester)

Legend

- (C) Team captain
- (S) Suspended
- (I) Ineligible
- (W) Walk-on
- Injured
- Current redshirt

Roster
Last update: December 20, 2017

== Schedule and results ==
Date time, TV	Rank^{#}	Opponent^{#}	Result	Record	Site (attendance) city, state
Exhibition
Nov 4, 2017*; 5:00 pm		Le Moyne	L 71–73		Alumni Recreation Center (1,378); Loudonville, NY
Non-conference regular season
Nov 10, 2017*; 7:00 pm		at College of Charleston	L 60–68 ^{OT}	0–1	TD Arena (4,955); Charleston, SC
Nov 13, 2017*; 7:00 pm		Florida Gulf Coast	L 53–86	0–2	Times Union Center (5,387); Albany, NY
Nov 17, 2017*; 7:00 pm		at Lehigh	L 90–91 ^{OT}	0–3	Stabler Arena (767); Bethlehem, PA
Nov 20, 2017*; 7:00 pm		at Bucknell	L 92–115	0–4	Sojka Pavilion (2,053); Lewisburg, PA
Nov 25, 2017*; 2:00 pm		Hofstra	W 85–76	1–4	Times Union Center (5,512); Albany, NY
Nov 29, 2017*; 7:00 pm		St. Bonaventure	L 55–75	1–5	Times Union Center (5,535); Albany, NY
Dec 2, 2017*; 2:00 pm, WNYA/ESPN3		Robert Morris	W 76–74	2–5	Times Union Center (5,749); Albany, NY
Dec 6, 2017*; 7:00 pm, ESPN2		at Louisville; Gotham Classic	L 60–86	2–6	KFC Yum! Center (17,215); Louisville, KY
Dec 9, 2017*; 7:30 pm, SNY/ESPN3		Albany; Gotham Classic/Albany Cup	L 69–74	2–7	Times Union Center (9,017); Albany, NY
Dec 11, 2017*; 7:30 pm, ESPN3		at Vermont	L 57–81	2–8	Patrick Gym (3,266); Burlington, VT
Dec 17, 2017*; 1:00 pm		at Bryant; Gotham Classic	W 87–68	3–8	Chace Athletic Center (406); Smithfield, RI
Dec 20, 2017*; 8:00 pm, ESPN3		at Memphis; Gotham Classic	L 66–70	3–9	FedExForum (6,079); Memphis, TN
Dec 22, 2017*; 7:00 pm, WNYA/ESPN3		Holy Cross	W 71–65	4–9	Times Union Center (5,526); Albany, NY
MAAC regular season
Dec 29, 2017; 7:00 pm, ESPN3		at Marist	L 58–63	4–10 (0–1)	McCann Field House (1,737); Poughkeepsie, NY
Jan 1, 2018; 1:00 pm, WNYA/ESPN3		Quinnipiac	L 70–71	4–11 (0–2)	Times Union Center (5,278); Albany, NY
Jan 5, 2018; 7:00 pm		Niagara	L 76–84	4–12 (0–3)	Times Union Center (5,848); Albany, NY
Jan 7, 2018; 3:00 pm, WNYA/ESPN3		Canisius	W 65–62	5–12 (1–3)	Times Union Center (6,114); Albany, NY
Jan 11, 2018; 7:00 pm, ESPN3		at Iona	L 69–71	5–13 (1–4)	Hynes Athletic Center (1,639); New Rochelle, NY
Jan 13, 2018; 7:00 pm		at Manhattan	L 61–72	5–14 (1–5)	Draddy Gymnasium (1,013); Riverdale, NY
Jan 18, 2018; 7:00 pm, ESPN3		Marist	W 68–65	6–14 (2–5)	Times Union Center (5,662); Albany, NY
Jan 21, 2018; 2:00 pm		at Quinnipiac	L 69–76	6–15 (2–6)	TD Bank Sports Center (1,915); Hamden, CT
Jan 25, 2018; 7:00 pm, ESPN3		at Monmouth	L 56–67	6–16 (2–7)	OceanFirst Bank Center (2,005); West Long Branch, NJ
Jan 29, 2018; 7:00 pm, ESPN3		Saint Peter's	W 59–57 ^{3OT}	7–16 (3–7)	Times Union Center (5,065); Albany, NY
Feb 2, 2018; 7:00 pm		Manhattan	L 47–51	7–17 (3–8)	Times Union Center (7,372); Albany, NY
Feb 5, 2018; 7:00 pm		at Fairfield	L 65–78	7–18 (3–9)	Webster Bank Arena (1,034); Bridgeport, CT
Feb 8, 2018; 7:00 pm, ESPN3		at Canisius	L 65–89	7–19 (3–10)	Koessler Athletic Center (1,512); Buffalo, NY
Feb 12, 2018; 7:00 pm, SNY/ESPN3		Iona	W 82–78 ^{OT}	8–19 (4–10)	Times Union Center (5,773); Albany, NY
Feb 15, 2018; 7:00 pm, ESPN3		at Rider	L 71–97	8–20 (4–11)	Alumni Gymnasium (1,519); Lawrenceville, NJ
Feb 18, 2018; 2:00 pm, ESPN3		Monmouth	L 83–89 ^{3OT}	8–21 (4–12)	Times Union Center (7,244); Albany, NY
Feb 21, 2018; 7:00 pm, WNYA/ESPN3		Fairfield	L 69–70	8–22 (4–13)	Times Union Center (6,924); Albany, NY
Feb 25, 2018; 2:00 pm		at Saint Peter's	L 48–65	8–23 (4–14)	Yanitelli Center (725); Jersey City, NJ
MAAC tournament
Mar 1, 2018; 7:30 pm, ESPN3	(10)	(7) Quinnipiac; First round	L 58–67	8–24	Times Union Center; Albany, NY
*Non-conference game. ^{#}Rankings from AP Poll. (#) Tournament seedings in parentheses. All times are in Eastern Time.
