= 2017–18 Fairfield Stags men's basketball team =

American college basketball season

2017–18 Fairfield Stags men's basketball
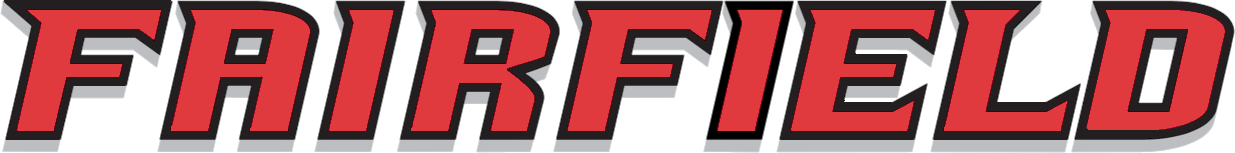
- Conference: Metro Atlantic Athletic Conference
- Record: 17–16 (9–9 MAAC)
- Head coach: Sydney Johnson (7th season)
- Assistant coaches: Mitch Buonaguro; Tom Parrotta; Tyson Wheeler
- Home arena: Webster Bank Arena; Alumni Hall

2017–18 MAAC men's basketball standings
	Conf.				Overall
Team	W		L	PCT	W		L	PCT
Rider	15	–	3	.833	22	–	10	.688
Canisius	15	–	3	.833	21	–	12	.636
Niagara	12	–	6	.667	19	–	14	.576
Iona †	11	–	7	.611	20	–	14	.588
Manhattan	9	–	9	.500	14	–	17	.452
Fairfield	9	–	9	.500	17	–	16	.515
Quinnipiac	7	–	11	.389	12	–	21	.364
Monmouth	7	–	11	.389	11	–	20	.355
Saint Peter's	6	–	12	.333	14	–	18	.438
Siena	4	–	14	.222	8	–	24	.250
Marist	4	–	14	.222	6	–	25	.194
† 2018 MAAC tournament winner

The 2017–18 Fairfield Stags men's basketball team represented Fairfield University during the 2017–18 NCAA Division I men's basketball season. The Stags, led by seventh-year head coach Sydney Johnson, played their home games at Webster Bank Arena in Fairfield, Connecticut, with three games at Alumni Hall, as members of the Metro Atlantic Athletic Conference (MAAC). They finished the season 17–16 overall, 9–9 in MAAC play, to finish in a tie for fifth place. As the No. 6 seed at the MAAC tournament, they defeated No. 11 seed Marist, upset No. 3 seed Niagara and No. 7 seed Quinnipiac to advance to the championship game where they lost to Iona.

== Previous season ==
The Stags finished the 2016–17 season 16–15, 11–9 in MAAC play, to finish in fifth place. They lost in the quarterfinals of the MAAC tournament to Siena. They were invited to the CollegeInsider.com Tournament where they lost in the first round to UMBC.

== Roster ==
2017–18 Fairfield Stags men's basketball team
Players
Coaches

Pos.	#	Name	Height	Weight	Year	Hometown
G/F	0	Olivier Cadieux	6 ft 4 in (1.93 m)	205 lb (93 kg)	So	Montreal, QC
G	1	Jerome Segura	5 ft 11 in (1.8 m)	175 lb (79 kg)	Sr	Houston, TX
G	2	Taj Benning	6 ft 3 in (1.91 m)	185 lb (84 kg)	Fr	Fair Lawn, NJ
G	3	Tyler Nelson	6 ft 3 in (1.91 m)	180 lb (82 kg)	Sr	Bradford, MA
G	4	Jared Harper	6 ft 1 in (1.85 m)	180 lb (82 kg)	Sr	Beverly Hills, CA
G	5	Aidas Kavaliauskas	6 ft 1 in (1.85 m)	175 lb (79 kg)	So	Kaunas, Lithuania
G	10	Thomas Nolan	6 ft 3 in (1.91 m)	195 lb (88 kg)	Jr	Trumbull, CT
G	11	Alonde Legrand	6 ft 6 in (1.98 m)	185 lb (84 kg)	Fr	Harlem, NY
F	12	Kevin Senghore-Peterson	6 ft 6 in (1.98 m)	220 lb (100 kg)	Fr	Kinna, Sweden
F	13	Jonathan Kasibabu	6 ft 8 in (2.03 m)	240 lb (109 kg)	Jr	Kinshasa, Democratic Republic of the Congo
F	14	Matija Milin	6 ft 9 in (2.06 m)	215 lb (98 kg)	Jr	Belgrade, Serbia
F	15	Wassef Methnani	6 ft 8 in (2.03 m)	208 lb (94 kg)	Fr	Kairouan, Tunisia
G	23	Ferron Jr. Flavors	6 ft 4 in (1.93 m)	180 lb (82 kg)	So	Federal Way, WA
G	25	Jesus Cruz	6 ft 5 in (1.96 m)	210 lb (95 kg)	Fr	Carolina, Puerto Rico
F	30	Omar El-Sheikh	6 ft 7 in (2.01 m)	195 lb (88 kg)	Fr	Cairo, Egypt
F	35	Aziz Sultan Essa	6 ft 9 in (2.06 m)	250 lb (113 kg)	Fr	Abu Al Hasany, Kuwait

Head coach

- Sydney Johnson (Princeton)

Assistant coach(es)

- Mitch Buonaguro (Boston College)
- Tom Parrotta (Fordham)
- Tyson Wheeler (Rhode Island)

Legend

- (C) Team captain
- (S) Suspended
- (I) Ineligible
- (W) Walk-on
- Injured
- Current redshirt

Roster
Last update: April 7, 2025

== Schedule and results ==
Date time, TV	Rank^{#}	Opponent^{#}	Result	Record	Site (attendance) city, state
Exhibition
October 23, 2017*; 7:00 p.m.		Hofstra; Exhibition to benefit Save the Children	W 94–78		Alumni Hall (1,453); Fairfield, CT
November 3, 2017*; 7:00 p.m.		Bridgeport	L 86–88		Alumni Hall (1,247); Fairfield, CT
Non-conference regular season
November 11, 2017*; 1:00 p.m., ESPN3		Penn	W 80–72	1–0	Webster Bank Arena (1,672); Bridgeport, CT
November 14, 2017*; 7:00 p.m., ESPN3		Loyola (MD)	W 64–52	2–0	Webster Bank Arena (1,231); Bridgeport, CT
November 18, 2017*; 7:00 p.m., BTN+		at No. 19 Purdue	L 64–106	2–1	Mackey Arena (14,804); West Lafayette, IN
November 24, 2017*; 4:30 p.m., ESPN3		vs. Jacksonville; Wright State Tournament	L 84–92	2–2	Nutter Center (3,456); Fairborn, OH
November 25, 2017*; 2:30 p.m., ESPN3		vs. Gardner–Webb; Wright State Tournament	W 75–64	3–2	Nutter Center (3,030); Fairborn, OH
November 26, 2017*; 3:30 p.m., ESPN3		at Wright State; Wright State Tournament	L 56–57	3–3	Nutter Center (3,045); Fairborn, OH
December 1, 2017*; 7:00 p.m.		at Wagner	L 76–78	3–4	Spiro Sports Center (793); Staten Island, NY
December 6, 2017*; 11:00 a.m., ESPN3		at Houston	L 66–88	3–5	H&PE Arena (3,548); Houston, TX
December 10, 2017*; 3:30 p.m.		at LIU Brooklyn	W 76–72	4–5	Barclays Center (1,242); Brooklyn, NY
December 17, 2017*; 1:00 p.m., Facebook Live		Old Dominion	L 77–82 ^{OT}	4–6	Alumni Hall (2,410); Fairfield, CT
December 22, 2017*; 7:00 p.m., Facebook Live		New Hampshire	W 78–68	5–6	Webster Bank Arena (923); Bridgeport, CT
MAAC regular season
December 28, 2017; 7:00 p.m., ESPN3		Saint Peter's	W 70–61	6–6 (1–0)	Webster Bank Arena (1,112); Bridgeport, CT
December 30, 2017; 7:00 p.m.		at Manhattan	L 58–61	6–7 (1–1)	Draddy Gymnasium (1,523); Riverdale, NY
January 5, 2018; 7:00 p.m.		at Rider	L 77–96	6–8 (1–2)	Alumni Gymnasium (1,405); Lawrenceville, NJ
January 7, 2018; 1:00 p.m., ESPN3		at Iona	L 65–84	6–9 (1–3)	Hynes Athletic Center (1,749); New Rochelle, NY
January 11, 2018; 1:00 p.m., ESPN3		Manhattan	L 53–59	6–10 (1–4)	Webster Bank Arena (1,214); Bridgeport, CT
January 13, 2018; 7:00 p.m., ESPN3		at Marist	L 89–95 ^{OT}	6–11 (1–5)	McCann Field House (1,288); Poughkeepsie, NY
January 20, 2018; 1:00 p.m., ESPN3		Niagara	W 104–85	7–11 (2–5)	Webster Bank Arena (1,312); Bridgeport, CT
January 23, 2018; 7:00 p.m., ESPN3		Rider	L 88–90	7–12 (2–6)	Webster Bank Arena (1,137); Bridgeport, CT
January 27, 2018; 1:00 p.m., ESPN3		vs. Quinnipiac; MAAC Tripleheader	L 70–75	7–13 (2–7)	Nassau Veterans Memorial Coliseum (2,545); Uniondale, NY
January 29, 2018; 7:00 p.m., ESPN3		Iona	W 103–100 ^{OT}	8–13 (3–7)	Webster Bank Arena (1,179); Bridgeport, CT
February 2, 2018; 7:00 p.m., ESPN3		at Monmouth	W 79–78	9–13 (4–7)	OceanFirst Bank Center (2,955); West Long Branch, NJ
February 5, 2018; 7:00 p.m., SNY		Siena	W 78–65	10–13 (5–7)	Webster Bank Arena (1,034); Bridgeport, CT
February 10, 2018; 3:00 p.m.		at Niagara	L 83–95	10–14 (5–8)	Gallagher Center (1,389); Lewiston, NY
February 12, 2018; 7:00 p.m., ESPN3		at Canisius	L 63–81	10–15 (5–9)	Koessler Athletic Center (1,011); Buffalo, NY
February 15, 2018; 7:00 p.m., SNY		Marist	W 83–79	11–15 (6–9)	Webster Bank Arena (1,191); Bridgeport, CT
February 17, 2018; 1:00 p.m., SNY		Quinnipiac	W 102–98 ^{2OT}	12–15 (7–9)	Webster Bank Arena (1,762); Bridgeport, CT
February 21, 2018; 7:00 p.m., ESPN3		at Siena	W 70–69	13–15 (8–9)	Times Union Center (6,924); Albany, NY
February 24, 2018; 1:00 p.m., ESPN3		Monmouth	W 69–66	14–15 (9–9)	Webster Bank Arena (1,341); Bridgeport, CT
MAAC tournament
March 1, 2018; 10:00 p.m., ESPN3	(6)	vs. (11) Marist; First round	W 71–57	15–15	Times Union Center; Albany, NY
March 3, 2018; 7:00 p.m., ESPN3	(6)	vs. (3) Niagara; Quarterfinals	W 90–77	16–15	Times Union Center; Albany, NY
March 4, 2018; 9:30 p.m., ESPNU	(6)	vs. (7) Quinnipiac; Semifinals	W 74–64	17–15	Times Union Center (2,151); Albany, NY
March 5, 2018; 7:00 p.m., ESPN	(6)	vs. (4) Iona; Championship	W 83–71	17–16	Times Union Center (3,329); Albany, NY
*Non-conference game. ^{#}Rankings from AP poll. (#) Tournament seedings in parentheses. All times are in Eastern.
