= 2018–19 Patriot League men's basketball season =

- League: NCAA Division I
- Sport: Basketball
- Duration: November 2018 through March 2019
- Teams: 10

Regular Season
- Season champions: Colgate; Bucknell
- Runners-up: Lehigh
- Season MVP: Rapolas Ivanauskas (Colgate)
- Top scorer: Andrew Kostecka (Loyola) 21.3

Tournament
- Champions: Colgate Raiders
- Runners-up: Bucknell Bison
- Finals MVP: Jordan Burns (Colgate)

Patriot League men's basketball seasons
- ← 2017–18 2019–20 →

2018–19 Patriot League men's basketball standings
	Conf.				Overall
Team	W		L	PCT	W		L	PCT
Colgate †	13	–	5	.722	24	–	11	.686
Bucknell	13	–	5	.722	21	–	12	.636
Lehigh	12	–	6	.667	20	–	11	.645
American	9	–	9	.500	15	–	15	.500
Navy	8	–	10	.444	12	–	19	.387
Army	8	–	10	.444	13	–	19	.406
Lafayette	7	–	11	.389	10	–	20	.333
Boston University	7	–	11	.389	15	–	18	.455
Loyola (MD)	7	–	11	.389	11	–	21	.344
Holy Cross	6	–	12	.333	16	–	17	.485
† 2019 Patriot League tournament winner

The 2018–19 Patriot League men's basketball season began with practices in October 2018, followed by the start of the 2018–19 NCAA Division I men's basketball season in November. Conference play began in January 2019 and concluded in February 2019. The season marked the 32nd season of Patriot League basketball.

== Preseason ==
=== Coaching changes ===
On March 8, 2018, Loyola (Maryland) announced G. G. Smith had resigned as head coach. He finished at Loyola with a five-year record of 56–98. On March 28, the Greyhounds hired Georgia Tech assistant coach Tavaras Hardy for the head coaching job.

=== Preseason poll ===
Rank	Team
1	Lehigh (7)
2	Bucknell (8)
3	Colgate (3)
4	Boston University (2)
5	Holy Cross
6	Army
7	American
8	Navy
9	Lafayette
10	Loyola (Maryland)

() first place votes

=== Preseason All-Conference Teams ===
Award	Recipients
All-Conference Team	Sa'eed Nelson (American); Will Rayman (Colgate); Jehyve Floyd (Holy Cross); Lance Tejada (Lehigh); Nate Sestina (Bucknell)

Patriot League Preseason Player of the Year: Sa'eed Nelson (American)
