= 2018–19 American Eagles men's basketball team =

American college basketball season

2018–19 American Eagles men's basketball
- Conference: Patriot League
- Record: 15–15 (9–9 Patriot)
- Head coach: Mike Brennan (6th season)
- Assistant coaches: Scott Greenman; Matt Wolff; Eddie Jackson
- Home arena: Bender Arena

2018–19 Patriot League men's basketball standings
	Conf.				Overall
Team	W		L	PCT	W		L	PCT
Colgate †	13	–	5	.722	24	–	11	.686
Bucknell	13	–	5	.722	21	–	12	.636
Lehigh	12	–	6	.667	20	–	11	.645
American	9	–	9	.500	15	–	15	.500
Navy	8	–	10	.444	12	–	19	.387
Army	8	–	10	.444	13	–	19	.406
Lafayette	7	–	11	.389	10	–	20	.333
Boston University	7	–	11	.389	15	–	18	.455
Loyola (MD)	7	–	11	.389	11	–	21	.344
Holy Cross	6	–	12	.333	16	–	17	.485
† 2019 Patriot League tournament winner

The 2018–19 American Eagles men's basketball team represented American University during the 2018–19 NCAA Division I men's basketball season. The Eagles, led by sixth-year head coach Mike Brennan, played their home games at Bender Arena in Washington, D.C. as members of the Patriot League. They finished the season 15–15, 9–9 in Patriot League play to finish in fourth place. They lost in the quarterfinals of the Patriot League tournament to Navy.

== Previous season ==
They finished the 2017–18 season 6–24, 3–15 in Patriot League play to finish in last place. They lost in the first round of the Patriot League tournament to Lafayette.

== Offseason ==
=== Departures ===
Name	Number	Pos.	Height	Weight	Year	Hometown	Reason for departure
James Washington	3	G	6'1"	160	Junior	Norwalk, CA	Left the team
Tyler McFarland	15	G	6'2'	184	Freshman	Denver, CO	Walk-on; didn't return
Kevin Brown	25	G	5'8"	160	Junior	West Orange, NJ	Walk-on; didn't return
Nick Macarchuk	30	F	6'5'	188	Freshman	Alamo, CA	Walk-on; didn't return
Drew Lamont	33	F	6'7"	210	Freshman	Plantation, FL	Transferred

=== Incoming transfers ===
Name	Number	Pos.	Height	Weight	Year	Hometown	Previous School
Jamir Harris	4	G	6'0"	190	Sophomore	North Brunswick, NJ	Transferred from Minnesota. Under NCAA transfer rules, Harris will have to sit out for the 2018–19 season. Will have three years of remaining eligibility.

=== 2018 recruiting class ===
College recruiting information
Name	Hometown	School	Height	Weight	Commit date
Jacob Boonyasith; SG	Jenison, MI	Jenison High School	6 ft 3 in (1.91 m)	205 lb (93 kg)	Apr 15, 2018
Jacob Boonyasith; SG	Recruit ratings: Scout: Rivals: (NR)				
Josh Alexander; PF	New Rochelle, NY	Iona Preparatory School	6 ft 8 in (2.03 m)	205 lb (93 kg)	Sep 17, 2017
Josh Alexander; PF	Recruit ratings: Scout: Rivals: (NR)				
Overall recruit ranking:
Note: In many cases, Scout, Rivals, 247Sports, On3, and ESPN may conflict in their listings of height and weight.; In these cases, the average was taken. ESPN grades are on a 100-point scale.; Sources: "2018 Team Ranking". Rivals.

=== 2019 recruiting class ===
College recruiting information (2018)
Name	Hometown	School	Height	Weight	Commit date
Bradley Nalley; SF	Corydon, IN	Corydon Central High School	6 ft 3 in (1.91 m)	190 lb (86 kg)	Sep 30, 2018
Bradley Nalley; SF	Recruit ratings: Scout: Rivals: (NR)				
Overall recruit ranking:
Note: In many cases, Scout, Rivals, 247Sports, On3, and ESPN may conflict in their listings of height and weight.; In these cases, the average was taken. ESPN grades are on a 100-point scale.; Sources: "2019 Team Ranking". Rivals.

== Roster ==
2018–19 American Eagles men's basketball team
Players
Coaches

Pos.	#	Name	Height	Weight	Year	Previous school	Hometown
G	0	Sa'eed Nelson	6 ft 2 in (1.88 m)	190 lb (86 kg)	Sr	St. Augustine Prep	Pleasantville, NJ
F	1	Jesse Little	6 ft 10 in (2.08 m)	204 lb (93 kg)	So	Starkville HS	Starkville, MS
G	2	Stacy Beckton, Jr.	6 ft 4 in (1.93 m)	186 lb (84 kg)	So	Atlantic HS	Daytona Beach, FL
G	4	Jamir Harris (redshirt)	6 ft 2 in (1.88 m)	198 lb (90 kg)	So	The Patrick School; Minnesota	North Brunswick, NJ
G	5	Larry Motuzis	6 ft 6 in (1.98 m)	205 lb (93 kg)	RS Sr	Hinsdale South HS; Saint Xavier	Darien, IL
G	10	CB Diallo	6 ft 1 in (1.85 m)	175 lb (79 kg)	RS Sr	Kilgore	Thiès, Senegal
F	12	Yilret Yiljep	6 ft 7 in (2.01 m)	250 lb (113 kg)	RS Sr	Westtown	Kaduna, Nigeria
G	13	Marvin Bragg	6 ft 6 in (1.98 m)	195 lb (88 kg)	RS So	Gahr HS	Cerritos, CA
G	14	Justin Perez	6 ft 1 in (1.85 m)	165 lb (75 kg)	Jr	Gulliver Prep	Miami, FL
F	21	Josh Alexander	6 ft 8 in (2.03 m)	243 lb (110 kg)	Fr	Iona Prep	Carmel, NY
F	22	Sam Iorio	6 ft 6 in (1.98 m)	230 lb (104 kg)	So	Parkland HS	Allentown, PA
F/C	23	Mark Gasperini	6 ft 10 in (2.08 m)	245 lb (111 kg)	Jr	Brimmer and May School	Moscow, Russia
G	33	Christian Sutton (W)	6 ft 3 in (1.91 m)	193 lb (88 kg)	Fr	Riverwood	Atlanta, GA
G	41	Jacob Boonyasith	6 ft 3 in (1.91 m)	215 lb (98 kg)	Fr	Jenison	Jenison, MI
F	45	Matt Cimino	6 ft 10 in (2.08 m)	212 lb (96 kg)	Sr	Worcester Academy; George Washington	Falmouth, ME

Head coach

- Mike Brennan (Princeton)

Assistant coach(es)

- Scott Greenman (Princeton)
- Matt Wolff (Boston University)
- Eddie Jackson (Ohio State)

Legend

- (C) Team captain
- (S) Suspended
- (I) Ineligible
- (W) Walk-on
- Injured
- Current redshirt

Roster

== Schedule and results ==
Date time, TV	Rank^{#}	Opponent^{#}	Result	Record	Site (attendance) city, state
Non-conference regular season
Nov 9, 2018*; 7:00 pm, ESPN+		at George Mason	W 78–75 ^{OT}	1–0	EagleBank Arena (5,774); Fairfax, VA
Nov 12, 2018*; 7:00 pm, BTN Plus		at Northwestern	L 51–63	1–1	Welsh–Ryan Arena (6,018); Evanston, IL
Nov 16, 2018*; 7:00 pm, Stadium		New Hampshire	W 68–44	2–1	Bender Arena (799); Washington, D.C.
Nov 24, 2018*; 1:00 pm, ESPN3		at UMBC	W 73–69	3–1	UMBC Event Center (1,037); Catonsville, MD
Nov 27, 2018*; 7:00 pm		at VMI	W 74–64	4–1	Cameron Hall (922); Lexington, VA
Nov 30, 2018*; 7:00 pm		Wagner	L 58–64	4–2	Bender Arena (730); Washington, D.C.
Dec 4, 2018*; 7:00 pm, NBCSWA		Saint Francis (PA)	W 95–82	5–2	Bender Arena (745); Washington, D.C.
Dec 8, 2018*; 4:00 pm		at Howard	L 83–85	5–3	Burr Gymnasium (1,823); Washington, D.C.
Dec 18, 2018*; 7:00 pm		Mount St. Mary's	L 55–56	5–4	Bender Arena (477); Washington, D.C.
Dec 22, 2018*; 12:00 pm		Maryland Eastern Shore	W 82–58	6–4	Bender Arena (1,330); Washington, D.C.
Dec 29, 2018*; 7:00 pm, ESPN+		at George Washington	L 67–71	6–5	Charles E. Smith Center (2,096); Washington, D.C.
Patriot League regular season
Jan 2, 2019; 7:00 pm, NBCSWA		Boston University	W 86–74	7–5 (1–0)	Bender Arena (393); Washington, D.C.
Jan 6, 2019; 2:00 pm		at Colgate	L 69–73	7–6 (1–1)	Cotterell Court (358); Hamilton, NY
Jan 9, 2019; 7:00 pm		Navy	W 71–63	8–6 (2–1)	Bender Arena (557); Washington, D.C.
Jan 12, 2019; 12:00 pm		at Bucknell	L 54–55	8–7 (2–2)	Sojka Pavilion (3,092); Lewisburg, PA
Jan 16, 2019; 7:00 pm		at Lehigh	L 76–83	8–8 (2–3)	Stabler Arena (1,084); Bethlehem, PA
Jan 19, 2019; 2:00 pm, Stadium		Lafayette	L 79–84	8–9 (2–4)	Bender Arena (694); Washington, D.C.
Jan 23, 2019; 5:00 pm		at Boston University	W 70–66	9–9 (3–4)	Case Gym (783); Boston, MA
Jan 26, 2019; 4:00 pm		Bucknell	W 76–68	10–9 (4–4)	Bender Arena (1,172); Washington, D.C.
Jan 30, 2019; 7:00 pm		at Loyola (MD)	W 74–68	11–9 (5–4)	Reitz Arena (484); Baltimore, MD
Feb 2, 2019; 2:00 pm		at Holy Cross	W 66–49	12–9 (6–4)	Bender Arena (1,184); Washington, D.C.
Feb 6, 2019; 7:00 pm		at Navy	L 67–77	12–10 (6–5)	Alumni Hall (1,413); Annapolis, MD
Feb 9, 2019; 2:00 pm, NBCSWA		Army	W 71–68	13–10 (7–5)	Bender Arena; Washington, D.C.
Feb 13, 2019; 7:00 pm, Stadium		Loyola (MD)	L 84–86	13–11 (7–6)	Bender Arena (681); Washington, D.C.
Feb 16, 2019; 4:00 pm		Colgate	L 81–83	13–12 (7–7)	Bender Arena (1,182); Washington, D.C.
Feb 20, 2019; 7:00 pm		at Lafayette	L 68–70	13–13 (7–8)	Kirby Sports Center (899); Easton, PA
Feb 24, 2019; 1:00 pm		at Army	W 77–66	14–13 (8–8)	Christl Arena (1,091); West Point, NY
Feb 27, 2019; 7:00 pm		Lehigh	L 66–80	14–14 (8–9)	Bender Arena (711); Washington, D.C.
Mar 2, 2019; 1:00 pm		at Holy Cross	W 86–66	15–14 (9–9)	Hart Center (1,048); Worcester, MA
Patriot League tournament
Mar 5, 2019; 7:00 pm	(4)	(5) Navy; Quarterfinals	L 56–60	15–15	Bender Arena; Washington, D.C.
*Non-conference game. ^{#}Rankings from AP poll. (#) Tournament seedings in parentheses. All times are in Eastern Time.

== See also ==
- 2018–19 American Eagles women's basketball team
