= 2018–19 Holy Cross Crusaders men's basketball team =

American college basketball season

2018–19 Holy Cross Crusaders men's basketball

Hall of Fame Tip Off Springfield champions
- Conference: Patriot League
- Record: 16–17 (6–12 Patriot)
- Head coach: Bill Carmody (4th season)
- Assistant coaches: Joe Kennedy; Freddie Owens; David Metzendorf
- Home arena: Hart Center

2018–19 Patriot League men's basketball standings
	Conf.				Overall
Team	W		L	PCT	W		L	PCT
Colgate †	13	–	5	.722	24	–	11	.686
Bucknell	13	–	5	.722	21	–	12	.636
Lehigh	12	–	6	.667	20	–	11	.645
American	9	–	9	.500	15	–	15	.500
Navy	8	–	10	.444	12	–	19	.387
Army	8	–	10	.444	13	–	19	.406
Lafayette	7	–	11	.389	10	–	20	.333
Boston University	7	–	11	.389	15	–	18	.455
Loyola (MD)	7	–	11	.389	11	–	21	.344
Holy Cross	6	–	12	.333	16	–	17	.485
† 2019 Patriot League tournament winner

The 2018–19 Holy Cross Crusaders men's basketball team represented the College of the Holy Cross during the 2018–19 NCAA Division I men's basketball season. The Crusaders, led by fourth-year head coach Bill Carmody, played their home games at the Hart Center in Worcester, Massachusetts as members of the Patriot League. They finished the season 16–17, 6–12 in Patriot League play to finish in last place. They defeated Lafayette in the first round of the Patriot League tournament before losing to Bucknell in the quarterfinals.

Following the season, head coach Bill Carmody announced his retirement. On July 3, 2019, the school named Marquette assistant Brett Nelson as Carmody's replacement.

== Previous season ==
The Crusaders finished the season 12–19, 8–10 in Patriot League play to finish in sixth place. In the Patriot League tournament, they defeated Navy in the quarterfinals before losing to Colgate in the semifinals.

== Offseason ==
=== 2018 recruiting class ===
College recruiting information
Name	Hometown	School	Height	Weight	Commit date
Marlon Hargis; SF	Mays Landing, NJ	St Augustine Preparatory School	6 ft 7 in (2.01 m)	190 lb (86 kg)	Apr 29, 2018
Marlon Hargis; SF	Recruit ratings: Scout: Rivals: (NR)				
Blake Verbeek; PF	Grand Rapids, MI	Calvin Christian High School	6 ft 10 in (2.08 m)	190 lb (86 kg)	Apr 20, 2018
Blake Verbeek; PF	Recruit ratings: Scout: Rivals: (NR)				
Overall recruit ranking:
Note: In many cases, Scout, Rivals, 247Sports, On3, and ESPN may conflict in their listings of height and weight.; In these cases, the average was taken. ESPN grades are on a 100-point scale.; Sources: "2018 Team Ranking". Rivals.

=== 2019 recruiting class ===
College recruiting information (2019)
Name	Hometown	School	Height	Weight	Commit date
Drew Lowder #48 PG	Ann Arbor, MI	Ann Arbor Pioneer High School	5 ft 11 in (1.80 m)	160 lb (73 kg)	Sep 8, 2018
Drew Lowder #48 PG	Recruit ratings: Scout: Rivals: (76)				
Joe Pridgen; SF	Byfield, MA	Governor's Academy	6 ft 5 in (1.96 m)	180 lb (82 kg)	Aug 3, 2018
Joe Pridgen; SF	Recruit ratings: Scout: Rivals: (NR)				
Ryan Wade; SG	Ann Arbor, MI	Skyline High School	6 ft 1 in (1.85 m)	165 lb (75 kg)	Sep 29, 2018
Ryan Wade; SG	Recruit ratings: Scout: Rivals: (NR)				
Overall recruit ranking:
Note: In many cases, Scout, Rivals, 247Sports, On3, and ESPN may conflict in their listings of height and weight.; In these cases, the average was taken. ESPN grades are on a 100-point scale.; Sources: "2019 Team Ranking". Rivals.

== Roster ==
2018–19 Holy Cross Crusaders men's basketball team
Players
Coaches

Pos.	#	Name	Height	Weight	Year	Previous school	Hometown
G	0	Caleb Green	5 ft 10 in (1.78 m)	175 lb (79 kg)	So	Proctor Academy	Londonderry, NH
G	2	Kyle Copeland	6 ft 4 in (1.93 m)	175 lb (79 kg)	So	Phillips Exeter Academy	Leesburg, VA
G	3	Jacob Grandison	6 ft 6 in (1.98 m)	196 lb (89 kg)	So	Phillips Exeter Academy	Oakland, CA
G	4	Austin Butler	6 ft 5 in (1.96 m)	212 lb (96 kg)	So	Greater Latrobe HS	Letrobe, PA
F	5	Connor Niego	6 ft 8 in (2.03 m)	212 lb (96 kg)	So	Lyons Township HS	Western Springs, IL
G	10	Patrick Benzan	5 ft 11 in (1.8 m)	177 lb (80 kg)	Sr	Roxbury Latin School	Wellesley, MA
G	12	Clayton Le Sann	6 ft 4 in (1.93 m)	184 lb (83 kg)	Jr	Cheshire Academy	Geneva, Switzerland
G	13	Marlon Hargis	6 ft 7 in (2.01 m)	203 lb (92 kg)	Fr	St. Augustine Prep	Mays Landing, NJ
G/F	14	Marcellis Perkins	6 ft 4 in (1.93 m)	185 lb (84 kg)	Sr	Deep Creek HS	Chesapeake, VA
F	15	Matt Faw	6 ft 9 in (2.06 m)	223 lb (101 kg)	So	Upper Merion Area HS	King of Prussia, PA
F	20	Jehyve Floyd	6 ft 8 in (2.03 m)	226 lb (103 kg)	Sr	Sayreville War Memorial HS	Sayreville, NJ
F	21	Chris Lovisolo (W)	6 ft 9 in (2.06 m)	240 lb (109 kg)	Fr	Don Bosco Prep	Allendale, NJ
G	22	Lincoln Yeutter (W)	6 ft 2 in (1.88 m)	188 lb (85 kg)	Fr	Bullis	Chevy Chase, MD
F	24	D.J. Hart (W)	6 ft 5 in (1.96 m)	232 lb (105 kg)	Fr	St. Benedict's Prep	Newark, NJ
G	31	Matt Zignorski	6 ft 2 in (1.88 m)	195 lb (88 kg)	Sr	Pope John XXIII HS	Sparta, NJ
F	42	Blake Verbeek	6 ft 10 in (2.08 m)	201 lb (91 kg)	Fr	Calvin Christian	Grand Rapids, MI

Head coach

- Bill Carmody (Union (NY))

Assistant coach(es)

- Joe Kennedy (Northwestern)
- Freddie Owens (Wisconsin)
- Dave Metzendorf (Ithaca)

Legend

- (C) Team captain
- (S) Suspended
- (I) Ineligible
- (W) Walk-on
- Injured
- Current redshirt

Roster
Last update: August 23, 2018

== Schedule and results ==
Date time, TV	Rank^{#}	Opponent^{#}	Result	Record	Site (attendance) city, state
Non-conference regular season
Nov 6, 2018*; 7:05 pm		Sacred Heart	W 93–81	1–0	Hart Center (1,032); Worcester, MA
Nov 10, 2018*; 7:30 pm, BTN Plus		at No. 19 Michigan; Hall of Fame Tip Off campus game	L 37–56	1–1	Crisler Center (12,355); Ann Arbor, MI
Nov 13, 2018*; 7:00 pm, FS2		at Providence; Hall of Fame Tip Off campus game	L 61–70	1–2	Dunkin' Donuts Center (6,042); Providence, RI
Nov 16, 2018*; 6:00 pm, ESPN3		vs. Stony Brook; Hall of Fame Tip Off Springfield semifinals	W 84–70	2–2	Mohegan Sun Arena (1,313); Uncasville, CT
Nov 18, 2018*; 11:00 am, ESPN3		vs. Siena; Hall of Fame Tip Off Springfield championship	W 57–45	3–2	Mohegan Sun Arena (6,825); Uncasville, CT
Nov 20, 2018*; 7:00 pm, ESPN+		at Albany	W 69–65	4–2	SEFCU Arena (1,614); Albany, NY
Nov 28, 2018*; 7:00 pm, ESPN+		at Harvard	L 62–73	4–3	Lavietes Pavilion (1,283); Cambridge, MA
Dec 1, 2018*; 1:05 pm, NESNplus		Fairleigh Dickinson	W 67–49	5–3	Hart Center (1,458); Worcester, MA
Dec 4, 2018*; 7:00 pm, NESNplus/Eleven		at Massachusetts	W 82–78	6–3	Mullins Center (2,257); Amherst, MA
Dec 8, 2018*; 1:05 pm		vs. Rhode Island; Worcester Showcase	L 63–79	6–4	DCU Center (2,312); Worcester, MA
Dec 20, 2018*; 2:05 pm		Canisius	W 65–63	7–4	Hart Center (681); Worcester, MA
Dec 22, 2018*; 12:05 pm		Siena	W 60–57	8–4	Hart Center (1,346); Worcester, MA
Dec 30, 2018; 1:00 pm, ESPN+		at Iona	W 78–71	9–4	Hynes Athletic Center (1,986); New Rochelle, NY
Patriot League regular season
Jan 3, 2019; 7:00 pm		at Loyola (MD)	W 80–73	10–4 (1–0)	Reitz Arena (409); Baltimore, MD
Jan 6, 2019; 1:00 pm		at Navy	L 48–50	10–5 (1–1)	Alumni Hall (1,236); Annapolis, MD
Jan 9, 2019; 7:05 pm		Lehigh	L 94–99 ^{OT}	10–6 (1–2)	Hart Center (1,045); Worcester, MA
Jan 12, 2019; 3:05 pm, Charter TV3		Lafayette	W 77–70	11–6 (2–2)	Hart Center (1,182); Worcester, MA
Jan 14, 2019; 7:00 pm, CBSSN		at Bucknell	L 78–93	11–7 (2–3)	Sojka Pavilion (2,514); Lewisburg, PA
Jan 19, 2019; 12:05 pm		Loyola (MD)	L 65–67 ^{OT}	11–8 (2–4)	Hart Center (958); Worcester, MA
Jan 23, 2019; 7:00 pm		at Army	L 57–76	11–9 (2–5)	Christl Arena (480); West Point, NY
Jan 26, 2019; 3:05 pm, NESNplus		Navy	W 69–64	12–9 (3–5)	Hart Center (2,821); Worcester, MA
Jan 30, 2019; 7:00 pm		at Boston University; Turnpike Trophy	L 54–68	12–10 (3–6)	Case Gym (966); Boston, MA
Feb 2, 2019; 2:00 pm		at American	L 49–66	12–11 (3–7)	Bender Arena (1,184); Washington, D.C.
Feb 6, 2019; 5:05 pm, Charter TV3		Army	W 56–42	13–11 (4–7)	Hart Center; Worcester, MA
Feb 10, 2019; 12:00 pm, CBSSN		at Lafayette	L 67–69	13–12 (4–8)	Kirby Sports Center; Easton, PA
Feb 13, 2019; 7:35 pm, NESN		Colgate	L 70–74	13–13 (4–9)	Hart Center; Worcester, MA
Feb 16, 2019; 12:05 pm, NESNplus		Bucknell	W 72–71	14–13 (5–9)	Hart Center; Worcester, MA
Feb 18, 2019; 7:05 pm, CBSSN		Boston University; Turnpike Trophy	W 70–60	14–14 (5–10)	Hart Center; Worcester, MA
Feb 24, 2019; 12:00 pm		at Lehigh	W 73–71	15–14 (6–10)	Stabler Arena; Bethlehem, PA
Feb 27, 2019; 6:00 pm, Stadium		at Colgate	L 59–79	15–15 (6–11)	Cotterell Court (481); Hamilton, NY
Mar 2, 2019; 1:05 pm		American	L 66–86	15–16 (6–12)	Hart Center (1,048); Worcester, MA
Patriot League tournament
Mar 5, 2019; 7:00 pm	(10)	at (7) Lafayette; First round	W 79–74	16–16	Kirby Sports Center (1,004); Easton, PA
Mar 7, 2019; 7:00 pm	(10)	at (2) Bucknell; Quarterfinals	L 65–77	16–17	Sojka Pavilion (2,107); Lewisburg, PA
*Non-conference game. ^{#}Rankings from AP Poll. (#) Tournament seedings in parentheses. All times are in Eastern Time.
