= 2018–19 Boston University Terriers men's basketball team =

American college basketball season

2018–19 Boston University Terriers men's basketball
- Conference: Patriot League
- Record: 15–18 (7–11 Patriot)
- Head coach: Joe Jones (8th season)
- Assistant coaches: Curtis Wilson; Walt Corbean; Mike Quinn
- Home arena: Case Gym

2018–19 Patriot League men's basketball standings
	Conf.				Overall
Team	W		L	PCT	W		L	PCT
Colgate †	13	–	5	.722	24	–	11	.686
Bucknell	13	–	5	.722	21	–	12	.636
Lehigh	12	–	6	.667	20	–	11	.645
American	9	–	9	.500	15	–	15	.500
Navy	8	–	10	.444	12	–	19	.387
Army	8	–	10	.444	13	–	19	.406
Lafayette	7	–	11	.389	10	–	20	.333
Boston University	7	–	11	.389	15	–	18	.455
Loyola (MD)	7	–	11	.389	11	–	21	.344
Holy Cross	6	–	12	.333	16	–	17	.485
† 2019 Patriot League tournament winner

The 2018–19 Boston University Terriers men's basketball team represented Boston University during the 2018–19 NCAA Division I men's basketball season. The Terriers, led by eighth-year head coach Joe Jones, played their home games at Case Gym as members of the Patriot League. They finished the season 15–18, 7–11 in Patriot League play to finish in a three-way tie for seventh place. As the No. 8 seed in the Patriot League tournament, they defeated Loyola (MD) in the first round before losing to top-seeded Colgate in the quarterfinals.

== Previous season ==
The Terriers finished the 2017–18 season 15–16, 10–8 in Patriot League play to finish in fifth place. In the Patriot League tournament, they defeated Lehigh in the quarterfinals before losing to Bucknell in the semifinals.

== Offseason ==
=== Departures ===
Name	Number	Pos.	Height	Weight	Year	Hometown	Reason for departure
Eric Johnson	0	G	6'2"	195	Senior	Durham, NC	Graduated
Nick Havener	1	F	6'8"	225	Senior	Sarasota, FL	Graduated
Will Goff	13	G	6'3"	190	Senior	Scottsdale, AZ	Graduated
Cheddi Mosely	15	G	6'3"	195	Senior	Jersey City, NJ	Graduated
Cedric Hankerson	21	G	6'5"	225	Senior	Miami, FL	Graduated
Destin Barnes	23	G	6'6"	210	Sophomore	Chicago, IL	Transferred to Florida SouthWestern State College

=== Incoming transfers ===
Name	Number	Pos.	Height	Weight	Year	Hometown	Previous school
Alex Vilarino	3	G	6'1"	180	RS Freshman	McKinney, TX	Transferred from Texas Tech in January during the 2017–18 season.

=== 2018 recruiting class ===
College recruiting information
Name	Hometown	School	Height	Weight	Commit date
Jack Hemphill #37 PF	Raleigh, NC	Ravencroft School	6 ft 8 in (2.03 m)	225 lb (102 kg)	Nov 4, 2017
Jack Hemphill #37 PF	Recruit ratings: Scout: Rivals: 247Sports: (79)				
Jordan Guest #49 PF	Rancho Santa Margarita, CA	Rancho Santa Margarita School	6 ft 7 in (2.01 m)	220 lb (100 kg)	Apr 27, 2017
Jordan Guest #49 PF	Recruit ratings: Scout: Rivals: 247Sports: (75)				
Fletcher Tynen #78 SF	Torrance, CA	Bishop Montgomery High School	6 ft 5 in (1.96 m)	190 lb (86 kg)	Apr 27, 2017
Fletcher Tynen #78 SF	Recruit ratings: Scout: Rivals: 247Sports: (69)				
Garrett Pascoe; PG	Concord, CA	Clayton Valley High School	6 ft 3 in (1.91 m)	N/A	Aug 10, 2017
Garrett Pascoe; PG	Recruit ratings: Scout: Rivals: 247Sports: (NR)				
Overall recruit ranking:
Note: In many cases, Scout, Rivals, 247Sports, On3, and ESPN may conflict in their listings of height and weight.; In these cases, the average was taken. ESPN grades are on a 100-point scale.; Sources: "2018 Team Ranking". Rivals.

=== 2019 recruiting class ===
College recruiting information (2019)
Name	Hometown	School	Height	Weight	Commit date
Ethan Brittain-Watts; PG	Culver, IN	Culver Academies	6 ft 0 in (1.83 m)	160 lb (73 kg)	Oct 14, 2018
Ethan Brittain-Watts; PG	Recruit ratings: Scout: Rivals: (NR)				
Overall recruit ranking:
Note: In many cases, Scout, Rivals, 247Sports, On3, and ESPN may conflict in their listings of height and weight.; In these cases, the average was taken. ESPN grades are on a 100-point scale.; Sources: "2019 Team Ranking". Rivals.

== Roster ==
2018–19 Boston University Terriers men's basketball team
Players
Coaches

Pos.	#	Name	Height	Weight	Year	Previous school	Hometown
F	0	Jordan Guest	6 ft 8 in (2.03 m)	215 lb (98 kg)	Fr	Santa Margarita Catholic HS	Rancho Santa Margarita, CA
G	1	Garrett Pascoe	6 ft 3 in (1.91 m)	180 lb (82 kg)	Fr	Clayton Valley Charter HS	Concord, CA
F	2	Tyler Scanlon (C)	6 ft 7 in (2.01 m)	215 lb (98 kg)	Jr	Westfield HS	Chantilly, VA
G	3	Alex Vilarino	6 ft 2 in (1.88 m)	180 lb (82 kg)	RS Fr	McKinney HS; Texas Tech	McKinney, TX
G/F	5	Walter Whyte	6 ft 6 in (1.98 m)	210 lb (95 kg)	RS So	St. Luke's School	New Haven, CT
G	14	Andrew Petcash	6 ft 4 in (1.93 m)	200 lb (91 kg)	So	Pine-Richland HS	Pittsburgh, PA
G	15	Jonas Harper (W)	6 ft 2 in (1.88 m)	190 lb (86 kg)	Fr	St. Luke's School	Stamford, CT
G	24	Kamali Chambers (C)	5 ft 11 in (1.8 m)	180 lb (82 kg)	Sr	Brewster Academy	Golden Valley, MN
G	30	Javante McCoy	6 ft 5 in (1.96 m)	180 lb (82 kg)	So	Phillips Exeter Academy	Milwaukee, WI
F	32	Jack Hemphill	6 ft 9 in (2.06 m)	230 lb (104 kg)	Fr	Ravencroft	Raleigh, NC
G/F	35	Fletcher Tynen	6 ft 7 in (2.01 m)	195 lb (88 kg)	Fr	Bishop Montgomery	Torrance, CA
C	41	Sukhmail Mathon	6 ft 10 in (2.08 m)	225 lb (102 kg)	So	Holderness School	Shavertown, PA
F	51	Max Mahoney (C)	6 ft 8 in (2.03 m)	235 lb (107 kg)	Jr	Ridge HS	Basking Ridge, NJ

Head coach

- Joe Jones (SUNY–Oswego)

Assistant coach(es)

- Curtis Wilson (Adelphi)
- Walt Corbean (Northern Kentucky)
- Mike Quinn (Bentley)

Legend

- (C) Team captain
- (S) Suspended
- (I) Ineligible
- (W) Walk-on
- Injured
- Current redshirt

Roster

== Schedule and results ==
Date time, TV	Rank^{#}	Opponent^{#}	Result	Record	Site (attendance) city, state
Non-conference regular season
Nov 6, 2018*; 8:00 pm, NESN		at Northeastern	W 77–74	1–0	Matthews Arena (1,155); Boston, MA
Nov 9, 2018*; 7:00 pm, NESN+		Vermont	L 72–78	1–1	Case Gym (1,185); Boston, MA
Nov 11, 2018*; 1:00 pm		Emerson; Hub City Classic	W 94–57	2–1	Case Gym (557); Boston, MA
Nov 14, 2018*; 7:30 pm, ESPN+		at Albany	W 71–61	3–1	SEFCU Arena (2,579); Albany, NY
Nov 17, 2018*; 2:30 pm, ESPN+		at Eastern Michigan; Hub City Classic	L 62–80	3–2	Convocation Center (2,059); Ypsilanti, MI
Nov 21, 2018*; 3:00 pm		at Drexel; Hub City Classic	L 67–86	3–3	Daskalakis Athletic Center (660); Philadelphia, PA
Nov 23, 2018*; 2:00 pm, BTN Plus		at Rutgers; Hub City Classic	L 44–54	3–4	Louis Brown Athletic Center (5,032); Piscataway, NJ
Nov 28, 2018*; 7:00 pm		at New Hampshire	W 82–53	4–4	Lundholm Gym (327); Durham, NH
Dec 1, 2018*; 7:00 pm		at Elon	W 65–58	5–4	Schar Center (1,478); Elon, NC
Dec 4, 2018*; 7:00 pm		UMass Lowell	W 79–60	6–4	Case Gym (603); Boston, MA
Dec 13, 2018*; 7:00 pm, NESN		at Dartmouth	L 68–78	6–5	Leede Arena (420); Hanover, NH
Dec 15, 2018*; 1:00 pm, NESN		Nicholls State	W 75–63	7–5	Case Gym (584); Boston, MA
Dec 21, 2018*; 7:00 pm		Bethune–Cookman	L 66–74	7–6	Case Gym (363); Boston, MA
Patriot League regular season
Jan 2, 2019; 7:00 pm		at American	L 74–86	7–7 (0–1)	Bender Arena (393); Washington, D.C.
Jan 5, 2019; 1:00 pm, Stadium		Bucknell	W 87–80	8–7 (1–1)	Case Gym (841); Boston, MA
Jan 9, 2019; 7:00 pm		Army	L 82–86	8–8 (1–2)	Case Gym (445); Boston, MA
Jan 12, 2019; 2:00 pm		at Navy	W 75–69	9–8 (2–2)	Alumni Hall (1,162); Annapolis, MD
Jan 16, 2019; 7:00 pm		at Loyola (MD)	L 73–81 ^{OT}	9–9 (2–3)	Reitz Arena (810); Annapolis, MD
Jan 19, 2019; 1:00 pm		Colgate	L 56–77	9–10 (2–4)	Case Gym (555); Boston, MA
Jan 23, 2019; 5:00 pm		American	L 66–70	9–11 (2–5)	Case Gym (783); Boston, MA
Jan 26, 2019; 2:00 pm		at Lehigh	L 78–94	9–12 (2–6)	Stabler Arena (1,175); Bethlehem, PA
Jan 30, 2019; 7:00 pm		Holy Cross; Turnpike Trophy	W 68–54	10–12 (3–6)	Case Gym (966); Boston, MA
Feb 2, 2019; 1:00 pm		at Colgate	W 76–68	11–12 (4–6)	Cotterell Court (557); Hamilton, NY
Feb 6, 2019; 7:00 pm		Lafayette	L 72–79	11–13 (4–7)	Case Gym (459); Boston, MA
Feb 9, 2019; 12:00 pm		at Bucknell	L 76–82	11–14 (4–8)	Sojka Pavilion (3,052); Lewisburg, PA
Feb 13, 2019; 11:00 am		at Army	L 61–71	11–15 (4–9)	Christl Arena; West Point, NY
Feb 16, 2019; 4:30 pm		Lehigh	L 79–84	11–16 (4–10)	Case Gym (1,303); Boston, MA
Feb 18, 2019; 7:00 pm, CBSSN		at Holy Cross; Turnpike Trophy	W 70–60	12–16 (5–10)	Hart Center (1,644); Worcester, MA
Feb 23, 2019; 4:30 pm		Loyola (MD)	W 72–65	13–16 (6–10)	Case Gym (1,054); Boston, MA
Feb 27, 2019; 7:00 pm		at Lafayette	W 84–82	14–16 (7–10)	Kirby Sports Center (1,247); Easton, PA
Mar 2, 2019; 12:00 pm		Navy	L 74–79	14–17 (7–11)	Case Gym (865); Boston, MA
Patriot League tournament
Mar 5, 2019; 7:00 pm	(8)	(9) Loyola (MD); First round	W 71–63	15–17	Case Gym (462); Boston, MA
Mar 7, 2019; 7:00 pm	(8)	at (1) Colgate; Quarterfinals	L 69–81	15–18	Cotterell Court (1,277); Hamilton, NY
*Non-conference game. ^{#}Rankings from AP Poll. (#) Tournament seedings in parentheses. All times are in Eastern Time.
