= 2018–19 Navy Midshipmen men's basketball team =

American college basketball season

2018–19 Navy Midshipmen men's basketball
- Conference: Patriot League
- Record: 12–19 (8–10 Patriot)
- Head coach: Ed DeChellis (8th season)
- Assistant coaches: Emmett Davis; David Harris; Jon Perry
- Home arena: Alumni Hall

2018–19 Patriot League men's basketball standings
| | Conf. | | | | Overall |
| Team | W | | L | PCT | W | | L | PCT |
|---|---|---|---|---|---|---|---|---|
| Colgate † | 13 | – | 5 | .722 | 24 | – | 11 | .686 |
| Bucknell | 13 | – | 5 | .722 | 21 | – | 12 | .636 |
| Lehigh | 12 | – | 6 | .667 | 20 | – | 11 | .645 |
| American | 9 | – | 9 | .500 | 15 | – | 15 | .500 |
| Navy | 8 | – | 10 | .444 | 12 | – | 19 | .387 |
| Army | 8 | – | 10 | .444 | 13 | – | 19 | .406 |
| Lafayette | 7 | – | 11 | .389 | 10 | – | 20 | .333 |
| Boston University | 7 | – | 11 | .389 | 15 | – | 18 | .455 |
| Loyola (MD) | 7 | – | 11 | .389 | 11 | – | 21 | .344 |
| Holy Cross | 6 | – | 12 | .333 | 16 | – | 17 | .485 |
† 2019 Patriot League tournament winner

The 2018–19 Navy Midshipmen men's basketball team represented the United States Naval Academy during the 2018–19 NCAA Division I men's basketball season. The Midshipmen were led by eighth-year head coach Ed DeChellis, and played their home games at Alumni Hall in Annapolis, Maryland as members of the Patriot League. They finished the season 12–19 overall, 8–10 in Patriot League play, to finish in a tie for fifth place. As the No. 5 seed in the Patriot League tournament, they advanced to the semifinals, where they were defeated by eventual tournament champion Colgate.

== Previous season ==
The Midshipmen finished the 2017–18 season 20–12, 11–7 in Patriot League play, to finish in a tie for third place. They lost in the quarterfinals of the Patriot League tournament to Holy Cross.

== Offseason ==
=== Departures ===
| Name | Number | Pos. | Height | Weight | Year | Hometown | Reason for departure |
|---|---|---|---|---|---|---|---|
| Nourse Fox | 0 | G | 6'1" | 205 | Senior | Memphis, TN | Graduated |
| Tom Lacey | 1 | F | 6'7" | 235 | Senior | Glen Ridge, NJ | Graduated |
| Bryce Dulin | 14 | G | 6'4" | 210 | Senior | Nixa, MO | Graduated |
| Shawn Anderson | 20 | G | 6'4" | 215 | Senior | New Castle, PA | Graduated |
| Mo Lewis | 23 | F | 6'6" | 240 | Junior | Alpharetta, GA | No longer on team roster |
| Tyler Riemersma | 41 | F | 6'8" | 215 | Freshman | Bloomington, MN | Transferred to Augustana (SD) |
| Eli Lake | 44 | G | 6'6" | 195 | Freshman | Blythewood, SC | No longer on team roster |

=== 2018 recruiting class ===
There was no recruiting class for 2018.

=== 2019 recruiting class ===
College recruiting (2019)
| Name | Hometown | School | Height | Weight | Commit date |
|---|---|---|---|---|---|
| Charles West; PG | Delray Beach, FL | Spanish River High School | 6 ft 3 in (1.91 m) | 180 lb (82 kg) | Oct 4, 2018 |
| Charles West; PG | Recruit ratings: Scout: Rivals: (NR) | | | | |
| Nate Allison; PF | Fayetteville, GA | Starrs Mill High School | 6 ft 8 in (2.03 m) | 210 lb (95 kg) | |
| Nate Allison; PF | Recruit ratings: Scout: Rivals: (NR) | | | | |
| Sean Yoder; PG | Perkasie, PA | Pennridge High School | 6 ft 2 in (1.88 m) | 180 lb (82 kg) | |
| Sean Yoder; PG | Recruit ratings: Scout: Rivals: (NR) | | | | |
Overall recruit ranking:
Note: In many cases, Scout, Rivals, 247Sports, On3, and ESPN may conflict in their listings of height and weight.; In these cases, the average was taken. ESPN grades are on a 100-point scale.; Sources: "2019 Team Ranking". Rivals.

== Roster ==
2018–19 Navy Midshipmen men's basketball team
Players
Coaches

| Pos. | # | Name | Height | Weight | Year | Previous school | Hometown |
|---|---|---|---|---|---|---|---|
| G | 0 | Josiah Strong | 6 ft 2 in (1.88 m) | 187 lb (85 kg) | Fr | Champlin Park HS | Brooklyn Park, MN |
| G | 1 | John Jr. Carter | 6 ft 4 in (1.93 m) | 188 lb (85 kg) | Fr | Summit HS | Spring Hill, TN |
| G | 2 | Hasan Abdullah | 6 ft 0 in (1.83 m) | 195 lb (88 kg) | Sr | Clay-Chalkville HS | Birmingham, AL |
| G | 3 | Matt Cullen | 6 ft 1 in (1.85 m) | 180 lb (82 kg) | Jr | Greater Latrobe HS | Latrobe, PA |
| G | 5 | Ryan Pearson | 6 ft 2 in (1.88 m) | 190 lb (86 kg) | Sr | Henrico HS | Richmond, VA |
| G | 10 | JR Mathis | 6 ft 1 in (1.85 m) | 175 lb (79 kg) | So | Kentucky Country Day School | Louisville, KY |
| G | 11 | Isaiah Burnett | 6 ft 5 in (1.96 m) | 180 lb (82 kg) | So | Glenelg Country School | Annapolis, MD |
| F | 12 | Ryan Reagan | 6 ft 8 in (2.03 m) | 215 lb (98 kg) | So | General McLane HS | Edinboro, PA |
| G | 14 | Dave Kasanganay | 6 ft 3 in (1.91 m) | 175 lb (79 kg) | Fr | Ardrey HS | Charlotte, NC |
| G | 15 | Dominick Antonelli | 6 ft 1 in (1.85 m) | 190 lb (86 kg) | Sr | Trinity HS | Mechanicsburg, PA |
| G | 20 | Greg Summers | 6 ft 3 in (1.91 m) | 190 lb (86 kg) | Fr | The First Academy | Ocoee, FL |
| F | 21 | George Kiernan | 6 ft 7 in (2.01 m) | 225 lb (102 kg) | Sr | Hinsdale Central HS | Hinsdale, IL |
| G | 22 | Cam Davis | 6 ft 1 in (1.85 m) | 185 lb (84 kg) | So | Kickapoo HS | Battlefield, MO |
| G | 23 | Jaylon Terrell | 6 ft 3 in (1.91 m) | 190 lb (86 kg) | Fr | Jonesboro HS | Riverdale, GA |
| F | 24 | Connor Mannion | 6 ft 7 in (2.01 m) | 225 lb (102 kg) | Jr | Lambert HS | Suwanee, GA |
| F | 25 | Alec Loehr | 6 ft 8 in (2.03 m) | 215 lb (98 kg) | So | Rosemount HS | Inver Grove Heights, MN |
| G | 30 | Kyle Marion | 6 ft 0 in (1.83 m) | 177 lb (80 kg) | Fr | Providence School | Jacksonville, FL |
| C | 32 | Jack Lawrence | 6 ft 9 in (2.06 m) | 245 lb (111 kg) | So | Gonzaga College HS | Alexandria, VA |
| C | 33 | Luke Loehr | 6 ft 7 in (2.01 m) | 225 lb (102 kg) | So | Rosemount HS | Inver Grove Heights, MN |
| F | 34 | Danny Ogele | 6 ft 7 in (2.01 m) | 220 lb (100 kg) | So | St. Ignatius College Prep | Chicago, IL |
| G | 35 | Christian Silva | 6 ft 2 in (1.88 m) | 195 lb (88 kg) | Fr | Archbishop Carroll HS | Miami, FL |
| C | 40 | Evan Wieck | 6 ft 8 in (2.03 m) | 235 lb (107 kg) | Jr | Amarillo HS | Amarillo, TX |
| F | 55 | Richard Njoku | 6 ft 7 in (2.01 m) | 235 lb (107 kg) | Fr | St. John's College HS | Washington, D.C. |

Head coach

- Ed DeChellis (Penn State)

Assistant coach(es)

- Emmett Davis (St. Lawrence)
- David Harris (Ashland)
- Jon Perry (East Tennessee State)

Legend

- (C) Team captain
- (S) Suspended
- (I) Ineligible
- (W) Walk-on
- Injured
- Current redshirt

Roster
Last update: July 27, 2024

== Schedule and results ==
| Date time, TV | Rank^{#} | Opponent^{#} | Result | Record | Site (attendance) city, state |
Non-conference regular season
| November 6, 2018*; 7:00 p.m. | | at Old Dominion | L 44–67 | 0–1 | Ted Constant Convocation Center (6,289); Norfolk, VA |
| November 9, 2018*; 8:30 p.m., CBSSN | | Maryland; Veterans Classic | L 57–78 | 0–2 | Alumni Hall (5,710); Annapolis, MD |
| November 14, 2018*; 7:00 p.m. | | Coppin State | W 77–58 | 1–2 | Alumni Hall (664); Annapolis, MD |
| November 18, 2018*; 2:00 p.m. | | Bryant | W 83–79 | 2–2 | Alumni Hall (817); Annapolis, MD |
| November 20, 2018*; 7:00 p.m. | | at Morgan State | L 51–75 | 2–3 | Talmadge L. Hill Field House (2,034); Baltimore, MD |
| November 28, 2018*; 7:00 p.m. | | Liberty | L 58–76 | 2–4 | Alumni Hall (489); Annapolis, MD |
| December 1, 2018*; 4:00 p.m. | | Brown | L 50–67 | 2–5 | Alumni Hall (671); Annapolis, MD |
| December 5, 2018*; 7:00 p.m. | | at Delaware | W 80–65 | 3–5 | Bob Carpenter Center (1,927); Newark, DE |
| December 9, 2018*; 1:30 p.m. | | at Lipscomb | L 81–107 | 3–6 | Allen Arena (1,446); Nashville, TN |
| December 21, 2018*; 7:00 p.m. | | at George Mason | L 63–84 | 3–7 | EagleBank Arena (3,419); Fairfax, VA |
| December 30, 2018*; 1:00 p.m. | | at Cornell | L 50–61 | 3–8 | Newman Arena (1,284); Ithaca, NY |
Patriot League regular season
| January 3, 2019; 7:00 p.m. | | Colgate | W 72–66 | 4–8 (1–0) | Alumni Hall (643); Annapolis, MD |
| January 6, 2019; 1:00 p.m. | | Holy Cross | W 50–48 | 5–8 (2–0) | Alumni Hall (1,236); Annapolis, MD |
| January 9, 2019; 7:00 p.m. | | at American | L 63–71 | 5–9 (2–1) | Bender Arena (557); Washington, D.C. |
| January 12, 2019; 2:00 p.m. | | Boston University | L 69–75 | 5–10 (2–2) | Alumni Hall (1,162); Annapolis, MD |
| January 16, 2019; 7:00 p.m. | | at Lafayette | W 85–77 | 6–10 (3–2) | Kirby Sports Center (989); Easton, PA |
| January 19, 2019; 2:30 p.m., CBSSN | | at Army | L 61–72 | 6–11 (3–3) | Christl Arena (5,013); West Point, NY |
| January 23, 2019; 7:00 p.m., Stadium | | Lehigh | L 74–85 | 6–12 (3–4) | Alumni Hall (1,294); Annapolis, MD |
| January 26, 2019; 3:00 p.m. | | at Holy Cross | L 64–69 | 6–13 (3–5) | Hart Center (2,821); Worcester, MA |
| January 30, 2019; 7:00 p.m. | | at Bucknell | L 57–69 | 6–14 (3–6) | Sojka Pavilion (2,154); Lewisburg, PA |
| February 2, 2019; 7:00 p.m. | | at Loyola (MD) | W 71–68 | 7–14 (4–6) | Reitz Arena (1,554); Baltimore, MD |
| February 6, 2019; 7:00 p.m. | | American | W 77–67 | 8–14 (5–6) | Alumni Hall (1,413); Annapolis, MD |
| February 9, 2019; 4:30 p.m. | | at Lehigh | L 57–83 | 8–15 (5–7) | Stabler Arena (1,803); Bethlehem, PA |
| February 13, 2019; 7:00 p.m. | | Lafayette | L 74–80 | 8–16 (5–8) | Alumni Hall (468); Annapolis, MD |
| February 16, 2019; 2:30 p.m., CBSSN | | Army | W 79–68 | 9–16 (6–8) | Alumni Hall (5,448); Annapolis, MD |
| February 21, 2019; 2:00 p.m. | | Loyola (MD) | L 70–79 | 9–17 (6–9) | Alumni Hall (243); Annapolis, MD |
| February 23, 2019; 2:00 p.m., CBSSN | | at Colgate | L 71–93 | 9–18 (6–10) | Cotterell Court (658); Hamilton, NY |
| February 27, 2019; 7:00 p.m. | | Bucknell | W 64–53 | 10–18 (7–10) | Alumni Hall (1,822); Annapolis, MD |
| March 2, 2019; 1:00 p.m. | | at Boston University | W 79–74 | 11–18 (8–10) | Case Gym (865); Boston, MA |
Patriot League tournament
| March 7, 2019; 7:00 p.m. | (5) | at (4) American; Quarterfinals | W 60–56 | 12–18 | Bender Arena; Washington, D.C. |
| March 10, 2019; 12:00 p.m., CBSSN | (4) | at (1) Colgate; Semifinals | L 70–80 | 12–19 | Cotterell Court (1,089); Hamilton, NY |
*Non-conference game. ^{#}Rankings from AP poll. (#) Tournament seedings in parentheses. All times are in Eastern.
