= 2018–19 Colgate Raiders men's basketball team =

American college basketball season

2018–19 Colgate Raiders men's basketball

Patriot League regular season co-champions Patriot League tournament champions

NCAA tournament, First Round
- Conference: Patriot League
- Record: 24–11 (13–5 Patriot)
- Head coach: Matt Langel (8th season)
- Assistant coaches: Dave Klatsky; Michael McGarvey; Pat Moore
- Home arena: Cotterell Court

2018–19 Patriot League men's basketball standings
	Conf.				Overall
Team	W		L	PCT	W		L	PCT
Colgate †	13	–	5	.722	24	–	11	.686
Bucknell	13	–	5	.722	21	–	12	.636
Lehigh	12	–	6	.667	20	–	11	.645
American	9	–	9	.500	15	–	15	.500
Navy	8	–	10	.444	12	–	19	.387
Army	8	–	10	.444	13	–	19	.406
Lafayette	7	–	11	.389	10	–	20	.333
Boston University	7	–	11	.389	15	–	18	.455
Loyola (MD)	7	–	11	.389	11	–	21	.344
Holy Cross	6	–	12	.333	16	–	17	.485
† 2019 Patriot League tournament winner

The 2018–19 Colgate Raiders men's basketball team represented Colgate University during the 2018–19 NCAA Division I men's basketball season. The Raiders, led by eighth-year head coach Matt Langel, played their home games at Cotterell Court in Hamilton, New York as members of the Patriot League. They finished the season 24–11, 13–5 to tie for first place. In the Patriot League tournament, they defeated Boston University, Navy, and Bucknell to win the Patriot League tournament. As a result, they received an automatic bid to the NCAA Tournament where they lost in the first round to Tennessee.

== Previous season ==
The Raiders finished the 2017–18 season 19–14, 12–6 in Patriot League play to finish in second place. They defeated Lafayette and Holy Cross to advance to the championship game of the Patriot League tournament where they lost to Bucknell. They were invited to the College Basketball Invitational where they lost in the first round to San Francisco.

== Offseason ==
=== Departures ===
Name	Number	Pos.	Height	Weight	Year	Hometown	Reason for departure
Sean O'Brien	0	G	6'2"	188	Senior	Lafayette Hill, PA	Graduated
Tom Rivard	14	F	6'7"	200	Senior	Worcester, MA	Graduated
Jordan Swopshire	15	F	6'6"	210	Senior	O'Fallon, MO	Graduated
Jordan Robertson	25	G	6'3"	185	Senior	Cape Mary Court House, NJ	Graduated
Dylan Whitbread	45	G	6'3"	210	Senior	Johannesburg, South Africa	Walk-on; graduated

=== Incoming transfers ===
Name	Number	Pos.	Height	Weight	Year	Hometown	Previous school
Nelly Cummings	0	G	6'0"	175	Sophomore	Midland, TX	Transferred from Bowling Green. Under NCAA transfer rules, Cummings will have to sit out for the 2018–19 season. Will have three years of remaining eligibility.

=== 2018 recruiting class ===
College recruiting information
Name	Hometown	School	Height	Weight	Commit date
Tucker Richardson; SF	Blairstown, NJ	Blair Academy	6 ft 4 in (1.93 m)	205 lb (93 kg)	Jul 5, 2018
Tucker Richardson; SF	Recruit ratings: Scout: Rivals: 247Sports: (NR)				
Liam Courtney; C	Kitchener, ON	TRC Academy	6 ft 11 in (2.11 m)	205 lb (93 kg)	Aug 9, 2017
Liam Courtney; C	Recruit ratings: Scout: Rivals: 247Sports: (NR)				
Overall recruit ranking:
Note: In many cases, Scout, Rivals, 247Sports, On3, and ESPN may conflict in their listings of height and weight.; In these cases, the average was taken. ESPN grades are on a 100-point scale.; Sources: "2018 Team Ranking". Rivals.

== Roster ==
2018–19 Colgate Raiders men's basketball team
Players
Coaches

Pos.	#	Name	Height	Weight	Year	Previous school	Hometown
G	0	Nelly Cummings (redshirt)	6 ft 0 in (1.83 m)	175 lb (79 kg)	So	Lincoln Park; Bowling Green	Midland, PA
G	1	Jordan Burns	6 ft 0 in (1.83 m)	175 lb (79 kg)	So	John Marshall	San Antonio, TX
G	2	Zach Light (W)	6 ft 3 in (1.91 m)	195 lb (88 kg)	Fr	Riverdale Country School	New York, NY
G	3	David Favorite	6 ft 3 in (1.91 m)	200 lb (91 kg)	Sr	Alamo Heights	San Antonio, TX
F	4	Sam Lindgren (W)	6 ft 6 in (1.98 m)	210 lb (95 kg)	Sr	Germantown Academy	Doylestown, PA
F	5	Malcolm Regisford	6 ft 8 in (2.03 m)	225 lb (102 kg)	Sr	Bellarmine-Jefferson	Woodland Hills, CA
F	10	Will Rayman	6 ft 8 in (2.03 m)	210 lb (95 kg)	Jr	Millbrook	New York, NY
C	12	Dana Batt	6 ft 9 in (2.06 m)	225 lb (102 kg)	Sr	Homestead	Fort Wayne, IN
G	13	Jack Ferguson	6 ft 3 in (1.91 m)	175 lb (79 kg)	So	Homestead	Fort Wayne, IN
F/C	14	Liam Courtney	7 ft 0 in (2.13 m)	205 lb (93 kg)	Fr	Saint John's-Kilmarnock	Kitchener, ON
G	15	Tucker Richardson	6 ft 5 in (1.96 m)	205 lb (93 kg)	Fr	Hunterdon Central	Flemington, NJ
G	21	David Maynard	6 ft 4 in (1.93 m)	190 lb (86 kg)	So	Herriman	Herriman, UT
F	22	Hugh Baxter	6 ft 8 in (2.03 m)	210 lb (95 kg)	So	Scotch College	Melbourne, Australia
G	23	Milan Williams	6 ft 3 in (1.91 m)	205 lb (93 kg)	Jr	Detroit Country Day	Detroit, MI
F	25	Rapolas Ivanauskas	6 ft 10 in (2.08 m)	225 lb (102 kg)	Jr	Brewster Academy	Barrington, IL
G	30	Francisco Amiel	6 ft 2 in (1.88 m)	180 lb (82 kg)	Sr	Escola Secundaria Professor Ruy Luis Gomes	Corroios, Portugal
G	42	Jimmy Yfantopulos (W)	5 ft 11 in (1.8 m)	165 lb (75 kg)	Fr	Brimmer and May School	Lowell, MA

Head coach

- Matt Langel (Penn)

Assistant coach(es)

- Dave Klatsky (Penn)
- Mike McGarvey (Ursinus)
- Pat Moore (Colgate)

Legend

- (C) Team captain
- (S) Suspended
- (I) Ineligible
- (W) Walk-on
- Injured
- Current redshirt

Roster

== Schedule and results ==
Date time, TV	Rank^{#}	Opponent^{#}	Result	Record	Site (attendance) city, state
Non-conference regular season
Nov 6, 2018*; 7:00 pm		at NJIT; Central New York Classic	L 78–81	0–1	Wellness and Events Center (1,339); Newark, NJ
Nov 9, 2018*; 7:00 pm		Monmouth	W 87–74	1–1	Cotterell Court (359); Hamilton, NY
Nov 11, 2018*; 2:00 pm		at Cornell; Central New York Classic	W 73–57	2–1	Newman Arena (1,266); Itahaca, NY
Nov 11, 2018*; 7:00 pm		Nazareth; Central New York Classic	W 86–68	3–1	Cottrell Court (308); Hamilton, NY
Nov 19, 2018*; 7:00 pm		Binghamton; Central New York Classic	W 76–68	4–1	Cotterell Court (324); Hamilton, NY
Nov 21, 2018*; 7:00 pm, ACCN Extra		at Syracuse	L 56–77	4–2	Carrier Dome (16,586); Syracuse, NY
Nov 24, 2018*; 2:00 pm		at Siena	W 84–79	5–2	Times Union Center (5,202); Albany, NY
Nov 30, 2018*; 8:30 pm		at South Florida	L 63–73	5–3	Yuengling Center (4,992); Tampa, FL
Dec 2, 2018*; 1:30 pm		at Florida Gulf Coast	W 74–56	6–3	Alico Arena (2,858); Fort Myers, FL
Dec 5, 2018*; 7:00 pm		at Columbia	W 64–62	7–3	Levien Gymnasium (749); New York, NY
Dec 8, 2018*; 2:00 pm, BTN Plus		at Penn State	L 65–76	7–4	Bryce Jordan Center (8,056); University Park, PA
Dec 15, 2018*; 2:00 pm		Marist	W 82–66	8–4	Cotterell Court (433); Hamilton, NY
Dec 29, 2018*; 4:00 pm		at Pittsburgh	L 54–68	8–5	Petersen Events Center (6,182); Pittsburgh, PA
Patriot League regular season
Jan 3, 2019; 7:00 pm		at Navy	L 66–72	8–6 (0–1)	Alumni Hall (643); Annapolis, MD
Jan 6, 2019; 2:00 pm		American	W 73–69	9–6 (1–1)	Cotterell Court (358); Hamilton, NY
Jan 9, 2019; 7:00 pm		at Bucknell	L 81–84	9–7 (1–2)	Sojka Pavilion (2,788); Lewisburg, PA
Jan 12, 2019; 7:00 pm		Lehigh	W 91–78	10–7 (2–2)	Cotterell Court (399); Hamilton, NY
Jan 16, 2019; 7:00 pm		at Army	L 81–91	10–8 (2–3)	Christl Arena; West Point, NY
Jan 19, 2019; 1:00 pm		at Boston University	W 77–56	11–8 (3–3)	Case Gym (555); Boston, MA
Jan 23, 2019; 7:00 pm		Lafayette	W 57–47	12–8 (4–3)	Cotterell Court (417); Hamilton, NY
Jan 26, 2019; 12:00 pm, CBSSN		at Loyola (MD)	L 72–79 ^{OT}	12–9 (4–4)	Reitz Arena (684); Baltimore, MD
Jan 30, 2019; 7:00 pm		Army	W 76–56	13–9 (5–4)	Cotterell Court (302); Hamilton, NY
Feb 2, 2019; 1:00 pm		Boston University	L 68–76	13–10 (5–5)	Cotterell Court (557); Hamilton, NY
Feb 4, 2019; 7:00 pm, CBSSN		at Lehigh	W 84–62	14–10 (6–5)	Stabler Arena (966); Bethlehem, PA
Feb 9, 2019; 2:00 pm		Loyola (MD)	W 75–72	15–10 (7–5)	Cotterell Court (532); Hamilton, NY
Feb 13, 2019; 7:30 pm		at Holy Cross	W 74–70	16–10 (8–5)	Hart Center (912); Worcester, MA
Feb 16, 2019; 4:00 pm		at American	W 83–81 ^{OT}	17–10 (9–5)	Bender Arena (1,182); Washington, D.C.
Feb 19, 2019; 7:00 pm		Bucknell	W 75–64	18–10 (10–5)	Cotterell Court (643); Hamilton, NY
Feb 23, 2019; 2:00 pm, CBSSN		Navy	W 93–71	19–10 (11–5)	Cotterell Court (658); Hamilton, NY
Feb 27, 2019; 6:00 pm, Stadium		Holy Cross	W 79–59	20–10 (12–5)	Cotterell Court (481); Hamilton, NY
Mar 2, 2019; 12:00 pm		at Lafayette	W 76–70	21–10 (13–5)	Kirby Sports Center (1,447); Easton, PA
Patriot League tournament
Mar 7, 2019; 7:00 pm	(1)	(8) Boston University; Quarterfinals	W 81–69	22–10	Cotterell Court (1,277); Hamilton, NY
Mar 10, 2019; 12:00 pm, CBSSN	(1)	(5) Navy; Semifinals	W 80–70	23–10	Cotterell Court (1,089); Hamilton, NY
Mar 13, 2019; 7:30 pm, CBSSN	(1)	(2) Bucknell; Championship	W 94–80	24–10	Cotterell Court (1,821); Hamilton, NY
NCAA tournament
Mar 22, 2019*; 2:45 pm, CBS	(15 S)	vs. (2 S) No. 6 Tennessee; First Round	L 70–77	24–11	Nationwide Arena (19,641); Columbus, OH
*Non-conference game. ^{#}Rankings from AP Poll. (#) Tournament seedings in parentheses. S=South; Source. All times are in Eastern Time.
