= 2018–19 Bucknell Bison men's basketball team =

American college basketball season

2018–19 Bucknell Bison men's basketball

Patriot League regular season co-champion
- Conference: Patriot League
- Record: 21–12 (13–5 Patriot)
- Head coach: Nathan Davis (4th season)
- Assistant coaches: Paul Harrison; John Griffin; Joe Meehan
- Home arena: Sojka Pavilion

2018–19 Patriot League men's basketball standings
	Conf.				Overall
Team	W		L	PCT	W		L	PCT
Colgate †	13	–	5	.722	24	–	11	.686
Bucknell	13	–	5	.722	21	–	12	.636
Lehigh	12	–	6	.667	20	–	11	.645
American	9	–	9	.500	15	–	15	.500
Navy	8	–	10	.444	12	–	19	.387
Army	8	–	10	.444	13	–	19	.406
Lafayette	7	–	11	.389	10	–	20	.333
Boston University	7	–	11	.389	15	–	18	.455
Loyola (MD)	7	–	11	.389	11	–	21	.344
Holy Cross	6	–	12	.333	16	–	17	.485
† 2019 Patriot League tournament winner

The 2018–19 Bucknell Bison men's basketball team represented Bucknell University during the 2018–19 NCAA Division I men's basketball season. The Bison, led by fourth-year head coach Nathan Davis, played their home games at Sojka Pavilion in Lewisburg, Pennsylvania as members of the Patriot League. They finished the season 21–12, 13–5 in Patriot League play, to earn a share of the Patriot League regular season championship. As the No. 2 seed in the Patriot League tournament, they defeated Holy Cross and Lehigh before losing to Colgate in the championship game. They were not selected for postseason play.

== Previous season ==
The Bison finished the 2017–18 season 25–10, 16–2 in Patriot League play, to win the Patriot League regular season championship. They defeated Loyola (MD), Boston University and Colgate to win the Patriot League tournament championship. As a result, they received the Patriot League's automatic bid to the NCAA tournament where they lost in the first round to Michigan State.

== Offseason ==
=== Departures ===
Name	Number	Pos.	Height	Weight	Year	Hometown	Reason for departure
Stephen Brown	2	G	5'11"	160	Senior	Manassas, VA	Graduated
Nana Foulland	20	C	6'10"	235	Senior	Reading, PA	Graduated
Zach Thomas	23	F	6'7"	195	Senior	Ijamsville, MD	Graduated

=== 2018 recruiting class ===
College recruiting information
Name	Hometown	School	Height	Weight	Commit date
Walter Ellis #72 SG	South Bend, IN	Brewster Academy	6 ft 5 in (1.96 m)	185 lb (84 kg)	Apr 8, 2018
Walter Ellis #72 SG	Recruit ratings: Scout: Rivals: 247Sports: (72)				
Andrew Funk; SG	Warminster, PA	Archbishop Wood High School	6 ft 3 in (1.91 m)	160 lb (73 kg)	Sep 4, 2017
Andrew Funk; SG	Recruit ratings: Scout: Rivals: 247Sports: (NR)				
Kahliel Spear; SF	The Colony, TX	The Colony High School	6 ft 6 in (1.98 m)	N/A	Apr 9, 2018
Kahliel Spear; SF	Recruit ratings: Scout: Rivals: 247Sports: (NR)				
Overall recruit ranking:
Note: In many cases, Scout, Rivals, 247Sports, On3, and ESPN may conflict in their listings of height and weight.; In these cases, the average was taken. ESPN grades are on a 100-point scale.; Sources: "2018 Team Ranking". Rivals.

=== 2019 recruiting class ===
College recruiting information (2019)
Name	Hometown	School	Height	Weight	Commit date
Alex Rice #53 PG	Jersey City, NJ	The Patrick School	6 ft 2 in (1.88 m)	N/A	Sep 12, 2018
Alex Rice #53 PG	Recruit ratings: Scout: Rivals: 247Sports: (NR)				
Malachi Rhodes; PF	McDonough, GA	Wheeler High School	6 ft 8 in (2.03 m)	180 lb (82 kg)	Sep 19, 2018
Malachi Rhodes; PF	Recruit ratings: Scout: Rivals: 247Sports: (NR)				
Jake van der Heijden; PF	Raleigh, NC	Ravenscroft School	6 ft 8 in (2.03 m)	205 lb (93 kg)	May 2, 2018
Jake van der Heijden; PF	Recruit ratings: Scout: Rivals: 247Sports: (NR)				
Alex Timmerman; C	Crystal Lake, IL	Crystal Lake Central High School	6 ft 9 in (2.06 m)	250 lb (110 kg)	Apr 24, 2018
Alex Timmerman; C	Recruit ratings: Scout: Rivals: 247Sports: (NR)				
Overall recruit ranking:
Note: In many cases, Scout, Rivals, 247Sports, On3, and ESPN may conflict in their listings of height and weight.; In these cases, the average was taken. ESPN grades are on a 100-point scale.; Sources: "2019 Team Ranking". Rivals.

== Roster ==
2018–19 Bucknell Bison men's basketball team
Players
Coaches

Pos.	#	Name	Height	Weight	Year	Previous school	Hometown
C	0	Paul Newman	6 ft 9 in (2.06 m)	234 lb (106 kg)	Sr	St. Andrews School	Philadelphia, PA
G	1	Kimbal Mackenzie	6 ft 1 in (1.85 m)	160 lb (73 kg)	Sr	John Carroll	Oakville, ON
F	2	Walter Ellis	6 ft 5 in (1.96 m)	187 lb (85 kg)	Fr	Brewster Academy	Granger, IN
G	3	Jimmy Sotos	6 ft 3 in (1.91 m)	192 lb (87 kg)	So	Conant	Elk Grove Village, IL
F/C	4	Nate Sestina	6 ft 9 in (2.06 m)	245 lb (111 kg)	Sr	Cameron County	Emporium, PA
G	5	Jordan Sechan (W)	6 ft 0 in (1.83 m)	170 lb (77 kg)	So	Northfield Mount Hermon	New Canaan, CT
G	10	Andrew Funk	6 ft 4 in (1.93 m)	180 lb (82 kg)	Fr	Archbishop Wood	Warrington, PA
G	11	Avi Toomer	6 ft 3 in (1.91 m)	192 lb (87 kg)	Jr	Grady	Atlanta, GA
F	12	John Meeks	6 ft 6 in (1.98 m)	225 lb (102 kg)	So	The Burlington School	Burlington, NC
F	13	Bruce Moore	6 ft 8 in (2.03 m)	223 lb (101 kg)	Jr	McDonogh	Randallstown, MD
G	14	Ben Robinson	6 ft 5 in (1.96 m)	200 lb (91 kg)	Jr	High Point Christian	High Point, NC
G	15	Nate Jones	6 ft 5 in (1.96 m)	209 lb (95 kg)	Sr	Radford	Radford, VA
G	22	Matt O'Reilly	6 ft 3 in (1.91 m)	195 lb (88 kg)	Sr	Prolific Prep Academy	Moraga, CA
F	23	Kahliel Spear	6 ft 7 in (2.01 m)	180 lb (82 kg)	Fr	The Colony	The Colony, TX

Head coach

- Nathan Davis (Randolph–Macon)

Assistant coach(es)

- Paul Harrison (Washington and Lee)
- John Griffin (Bucknell)
- Joe Meehan (Lebanon Valley)

Legend

- (C) Team captain
- (S) Suspended
- (I) Ineligible
- (W) Walk-on
- Injured
- Current redshirt

Roster
Last update: June 3, 2024

== Schedule and results ==
Date time, TV	Rank^{#}	Opponent^{#}	Result	Record	Site (attendance) city, state
Non-conference regular season
November 7, 2018*; 7:00 p.m.		at St. Bonaventure	W 88–85 ^{OT}	1–0	Reilly Center (4,668); Olean, NY
November 10, 2018*; 7:00 p.m.		Fairfield	L 58–60	1–1	Sojka Pavilion (3,183); Lewisburg, PA
November 13, 2018*; 7:00 p.m., WQMY		Canisius	L 73–82	1–2	Sojka Pavilion (2,237); Lewisburg, PA
November 25, 2018*; 2:00 p.m.		at Vermont	W 69–61	2–2	Patrick Gym (2,446); Burlington, VT
November 28, 2018*; 7:00 p.m.		Northeastern	L 78–96	2–3	Sojka Pavilion (2,121); Lewisburg, PA
December 1, 2018*; 7:00 p.m., Stadium		Monmouth	W 65–43	3–3	Sojka Pavilion (2,579); Lewisburg, PA
December 4, 2018*; 7:00 p.m.		at La Salle	W 92–79	4–3	Tom Gola Arena (1,321); Philadelphia, PA
December 15, 2018*; 12:00 p.m., BTN		at No. 15 Ohio State	L 71–73	4–4	Value City Arena (14,241); Columbus, OH
December 19, 2018*; 10:00 p.m.		at Saint Mary's	L 56–85	4–5	McKeon Pavilion (2,622); Moraga, CA
December 22, 2018*; 10:00 p.m., ESPN3		vs. Rhode Island; Diamond Head Classic quarterfinals	W 84–82	5–5	Stan Sheriff Center; Honolulu, HI
December 23, 2018*; 10:00 p.m., ESPN2		vs. TCU; Diamond Head Classic semifinals	L 65–82	5–6	Stan Sheriff Center; Honolulu, HI
December 25, 2018*; 6:30 p.m., ESPNU		vs. UNLV; Diamond Head Classic third-place game	W 97–72	6–6	Stan Sheriff Center; Honolulu, HI
Patriot League regular season
January 2, 2019; 7:00 p.m., Stadium		at Army	W 64–63	7–6 (1–0)	Christl Arena (958); West Point, NY
January 5, 2019; 1:00 p.m., Stadium		at Boston University	L 80–87	7–7 (1–1)	Case Gym (841); Boston, MA
January 9, 2019; 7:00 p.m.		Colgate	W 84–81	8–7 (2–1)	Sojka Pavilion (2,788); Lewisburg, PA
January 12, 2019; 12:00 p.m.		American	W 55–54	9–7 (3–1)	Sojka Pavilion (3,092); Lewisburg, PA
January 14, 2019; 7:00 p.m., CBSSN		Holy Cross	W 93–78	10–7 (4–1)	Sojka Pavilion (2,514); Lewisburg, PA
January 19, 2019; 12:00 p.m.		at Lehigh	W 85–83	11–7 (5–1)	Stabler Arena (1,558); Bethlehem, PA
January 23, 2019; 7:00 p.m.		Loyola (MD)	W 71–68	12–7 (6–1)	Sojka Pavilion (2,243); Lewisburg, PA
January 26, 2019; 4:00 p.m.		at American	L 68–76	12–8 (6–2)	Bender Arena (1,172); Washington, D.C.
January 30, 2019; 7:00 p.m.		Navy	W 69–57	13–8 (7–2)	Sojka Pavilion (2,154); Lewisburg, PA
February 2, 2019; 2:00 p.m.		at Lafayette	W 94–66	14–8 (8–2)	Kirby Sports Center (1,487); Easton, PA
February 6, 2019; 7:00 p.m.		at Loyola (MD)	W 84–72	15–8 (9–2)	Reitz Arena (730); Baltimore, MD
February 9, 2019; 12:00 p.m., WQMY		Boston University	W 82–76	16–8 (10–2)	Sojka Pavilion (3,052); Lewisburg, PA
February 11, 2019; 7:00 p.m., CBSSN		Lehigh	W 87–75	17–8 (11–2)	Sojka Pavilion (2,793); Lewisburg, PA
February 16, 2019; 7:00 p.m.		at Holy Cross	L 71–72	17–9 (11–3)	Hart Center (1,564); Worcester, MA
February 19, 2019; 7:00 p.m., Stadium		at Colgate	L 64–75	17–10 (11–4)	Cotterell Court (643); Hamilton, NY
February 24, 2019; 2:00 p.m., WQMY		Lafayette	W 118–76	18–10 (12–4)	Sojka Pavilion (2,968); Lewisburg, PA
February 27, 2019; 7:00 p.m.		at Navy	L 53–64	18–11 (12–5)	Alumni Hall (1,822); Annapolis, MD
March 2, 2019; 12:00 p.m.		Army	W 62–61	19–11 (13–5)	Sojka Pavilion (2,982); Lewisburg, PA
Patriot League tournament
March 7, 2019; 7:00 p.m.	(2)	(10) Holy Cross; Quarterfinals	W 77–65	20–11	Sojka Pavilion (2,107); Lewisburg, PA
March 10, 2019; 2:00 p.m., CBSSN	(2)	(3) Lehigh; Semifinals	W 97–75	21–11	Sojka Pavilion (2,718); Lewisburg, PA
March 13, 2019; 7:30 p.m., CBSSN	(2)	(1) Colgate; Championship	L 80–94	21–12	Cotterell Court; Hamilton, NY
*Non-conference game. ^{#}Rankings from AP poll. (#) Tournament seedings in parentheses. All times are in Eastern.
