= 2018–19 Army Black Knights men's basketball team =

American college basketball season

2018–19 Army Black Knights men's basketball
- Conference: Patriot League
- Record: 13–19 (8–10 Patriot)
- Head coach: Jimmy Allen (3rd season)
- Assistant coaches: Brandon Linton; Drew Adams; Ben Wilkins; Zak Boisvert
- Home arena: Christl Arena

2018–19 Patriot League men's basketball standings
	Conf.				Overall
Team	W		L	PCT	W		L	PCT
Colgate †	13	–	5	.722	24	–	11	.686
Bucknell	13	–	5	.722	21	–	12	.636
Lehigh	12	–	6	.667	20	–	11	.645
American	9	–	9	.500	15	–	15	.500
Navy	8	–	10	.444	12	–	19	.387
Army	8	–	10	.444	13	–	19	.406
Lafayette	7	–	11	.389	10	–	20	.333
Boston University	7	–	11	.389	15	–	18	.455
Loyola (MD)	7	–	11	.389	11	–	21	.344
Holy Cross	6	–	12	.333	16	–	17	.485
† 2019 Patriot League tournament winner

The 2018–19 Army Black Knights men's basketball team represented the United States Military Academy during the 2018–19 NCAA Division I men's basketball season. The Black Knights were led by third-year head coach Jimmy Allen, and played their home games at Christl Arena in West Point, New York as members of the Patriot League. They finished the season 13–19 overall, 8–10 in Patriot League play to finish in a tie for fifth place. As the No. 6 seed in the Patriot League tournament, they lost in the quarterfinals to Lehigh.

== Previous season ==
The Black Knights finished the 2017–18 season 13–17, 6–12 in Patriot League play to finish in a tie for eighth place. They lost in the first round of the Patriot League tournament to Loyola (MD).

== Offseason ==
=== Departures ===
Name	Number	Pos.	Height	Weight	Year	Hometown	Reason for departure
Babacar Thiombane	0	F	6'7"	198	Freshman	Los Angeles, CA	Transferred to East Los Angeles College
Ben Mammel	5	G	6'0"	183	Sophomore	Cincinnati, OH	No longer on team roster
Luke Morrison	25	F	6'6"	218	Senior	Charlotte, NC	Graduated
Mark Pollack	44	F	6'6"	218	Senior	Charlotte, NC	Graduated

=== 2018 recruiting class ===
College recruiting information
Name	Hometown	School	Height	Weight	Commit date
Sam Parini; C	Fairview, PA	Fairview High School	6 ft 11 in (2.11 m)	N/A	
Sam Parini; C	Recruit ratings: Scout: Rivals: (54)				
Overall recruit ranking:
Note: In many cases, Scout, Rivals, 247Sports, On3, and ESPN may conflict in their listings of height and weight.; In these cases, the average was taken. ESPN grades are on a 100-point scale.; Sources: "2018 Team Ranking". Rivals.

=== 2019 recruiting class ===
College recruiting information (2019)
Name	Hometown	School	Height	Weight	Commit date
Victor Konopka; C	Ramsey, NJ	Don Bosco High School	6 ft 6 in (1.98 m)	N/A	
Victor Konopka; C	Recruit ratings: Scout: Rivals: (NR)				
Isaac Bullard; SG	Pflugerville, TX	Hendrickson High School	6 ft 4 in (1.93 m)	N/A	Oct 21, 2018
Isaac Bullard; SG	Recruit ratings: Scout: Rivals: (NR)				
Overall recruit ranking:
Note: In many cases, Scout, Rivals, 247Sports, On3, and ESPN may conflict in their listings of height and weight.; In these cases, the average was taken. ESPN grades are on a 100-point scale.; Sources: "2019 Team Ranking". Rivals.

== Roster ==
2018–19 Army Black Knights men's basketball team
Players
Coaches

Pos.	#	Name	Height	Weight	Year	Previous school	Hometown
G	0	Josh Caldwell	6 ft 2 in (1.88 m)	180 lb (82 kg)	Fr	Heathwood Hall	Columbia, SC
G	1	Jordan Fox (C)	6 ft 6 in (1.98 m)	190 lb (86 kg)	Sr	Jackson County HS	Jackson County, KY
G	2	Cayne Edwards	6 ft 4 in (1.93 m)	215 lb (98 kg)	Sr	Samuel Clemens HS	Schertz, TX
G	3	Tommy Funk (C)	6 ft 0 in (1.83 m)	195 lb (88 kg)	Sr	Archbishop Wood HS	Warrington, PA
G	5	Mark Madden	6 ft 5 in (1.96 m)	205 lb (93 kg)	Jr	St. Joseph HS	South Bend, IN
G/F	10	Jacob Kessler	6 ft 4 in (1.93 m)	193 lb (88 kg)	Jr	Mills E. Godwin HS	Richmond, VA
G	11	Tucker Blackwell	6 ft 1 in (1.85 m)	178 lb (81 kg)	Jr	Bloomington HS North	Bloomington, IN
F	12	Nick Finke	6 ft 7 in (2.01 m)	220 lb (100 kg)	Jr	Champaign Central HS	Champaign, IL
F/C	14	Matt Wilson	6 ft 9 in (2.06 m)	245 lb (111 kg)	Sr	Campbell County HS	Alexandria, KY
F	15	Adam Roe	6 ft 5 in (1.96 m)	215 lb (98 kg)	Sr	West Platte HS	Weston, MO
G	21	Will Culliton	6 ft 2 in (1.88 m)	187 lb (85 kg)	So	Breck School	Wayzata, MN
G	23	Aaron Duhart	6 ft 0 in (1.83 m)	190 lb (86 kg)	Fr	Trinity Episcopal	Richmond, VA
G	24	Jason Houle	6 ft 5 in (1.96 m)	215 lb (98 kg)	Sr	Father Gabriel Richard HS	Plymouth, MI
G	25	Jordan Coleman	6 ft 6 in (1.98 m)	180 lb (82 kg)	Fr	Greenwood	Greenwood, SC
F	30	Ben Kinker	6 ft 8 in (2.03 m)	220 lb (100 kg)	Fr	Oldenburg Academy	Greensburg, IN
G	32	John Scully	6 ft 2 in (1.88 m)	220 lb (100 kg)	Fr	Flower Mound HS	Flower Mound, TX
F	33	Cam Fuller	6 ft 8 in (2.03 m)	225 lb (102 kg)	So	William S. Hart HS	Santa Clarita, CA
C	34	John Miller	6 ft 9 in (2.06 m)	240 lb (109 kg)	Sr	New Albany HS	New Albany, NY
F	35	Alex King	6 ft 8 in (2.03 m)	200 lb (91 kg)	So	Columbus North HS	Columbus, IN
G	42	Brendan Thiele	6 ft 2 in (1.88 m)	210 lb (95 kg)	Fr	St. Peter's Prep	Kearny, NJ
F	43	Keeston Smith	6 ft 5 in (1.96 m)	210 lb (95 kg)	Jr	La Salle Catholic College Prep	Oregon City, OR
F	51	Parker Fennema	6 ft 6 in (1.98 m)	215 lb (98 kg)	Sr	Sanderson HS	Raleigh, NC
G/F	52	John Emezie	6 ft 6 in (1.98 m)	220 lb (100 kg)	Sr	Marvin Ridge HS	Waxhaw, NC
G	53	Lance Lawson	6 ft 2 in (1.88 m)	190 lb (86 kg)	Jr	Ardrey Kell HS	Charlotte, NC

Head coach

- Jimmy Allen (Emory & Henry)

Assistant coach(es)

- Brandon Linton (Clarkson)
- Drew Adams (Chicago)
- Ben Wilkins (NC State)
- Zak Boisvert (Fordham)

Legend

- (C) Team captain
- (S) Suspended
- (I) Ineligible
- (W) Walk-on
- Injured
- Current redshirt

Roster

== Schedule and results ==
Date time, TV	Rank^{#}	Opponent^{#}	Result	Record	Site (attendance) city, state
Non-conference regular season
Nov 6, 2018*; 7:00 pm		Marist	W 73–69	1–0	Christl Arena (573); West Point, NY
Nov 11, 2018*; 1:00 pm, ESPN		at No. 4 Duke	L 72–94	1–1	Cameron Indoor Stadium (9,314); Durham, NC
Nov 16, 2018*; 5:00 pm, ESPN+		vs. Sacred Heart; Brown Bears Tip-Off Classic	L 78–79	1-2	Pizzitola Sports Center (1,131); Providence, RI
Nov 17, 2018*; 3:30 pm, ESPN+		vs. UMass Lowell; Brown Bears Tip-Off Classic	L 85–92	1–3	Pizzitola Sports Center (864); Providence, RI
Nov 18, 2018*; 4:00 pm, ESPN+		at Brown; Brown Bears Tip-Off Classic	L 66–86	1–4	Pizzitola Sports Center (946); Providence, RI
Nov 21, 2018*; 7:30 pm		Maritime	W 91–40	2–4	Christl Arena (554); West Point, NY
Nov 24, 2018*; 2:00 pm		at Miami (OH)	L 55–85	2–5	Millett Hall (1,307); Oxford, OH
Nov 28, 2018*; 7:30 pm		Binghamton	W 67–56	3–5	Christl Arena (500); West Point, NY
Dec 1, 2018*; 2:00 pm		Fairfield	W 63–60	4–5	Christl Arena (723); West Point, NY
Dec 4, 2018*; 7:00 pm		at NJIT	L 72–77	4–6	Wellness and Events Center (688); Newark, NJ
Dec 8, 2018*; 4:00 pm		at Air Force	W 66–61	5–6	Clune Arena (1,976); Colorado Springs, CO
Dec 12, 2018*; 7:00 pm		at Fairleigh Dickinson	L 84–93	5–7	Rothman Center (566); Teaneck, NJ
Dec 22, 2018*; 1:00 pm		Niagara	L 66–78	5–8	Christl Arena (798); West Point, NY
Patriot League regular season
Jan 2, 2019; 7:00 pm, Stadium		Bucknell	L 63–64	5–9 (0–1)	Christl Arena (958); West Point, NY
Jan 5, 2019; 1:00 pm		Lafayette	W 77–69	6–9 (1–1)	Christl Arena (472); West Point, NY
Jan 9, 2019; 7:00 pm		at Boston University	W 86–82	7–9 (2–1)	Case Gym (445); Boston, MA
Jan 12, 2019; 12:00 pm, Stadium		at Loyola (MD)	L 64–66	7–10 (2–2)	Reitz Arena (818); Baltimore, MD
Jan 16, 2019; 7:00 pm		Colgate	W 91–81	8–10 (3–2)	Christl Arena; West Point, NY
Jan 19, 2019; 2:30 pm, CBSSN		Navy	W 72–61	9–10 (4–2)	Christl Arena (5,013); West Point, NY
Jan 23, 2019; 7:00 pm		Holy Cross	W 76–57	10–10 (5–2)	Christl Arena (480); West Point, NY
Jan 26, 2019; 2:00 pm		at Lafayette	W 69–63	11–10 (6–2)	Kirby Sports Center (1,189); Easton, PA
Jan 30, 2019; 7:00 pm		at Colgate	L 56–76	11–11 (6–3)	Cotterell Court (302); Hamilton, NY
Feb 2, 2019; 1:00 pm, Stadium		Lehigh	L 70–75	11–12 (6–4)	Christl Arena (873); West Point, NY
Feb 6, 2019; 7:00 pm		at Holy Cross	L 42–56	11–13 (6–5)	Hart Center (1,047); Worcester, MA
Feb 9, 2019; 2:00 pm		at American	L 68–71	11–14 (6–6)	Bender Arena (1,093); Washington, D.C.
Feb 13, 2019; 11:00 am		Boston University	W 71–61	12−14 (7−6)	Christl Arena (465); West Point, NY
Feb 16, 2019; 2:30 pm, CBSSN		at Navy	L 68−79	12−15 (7−7)	Alumni Hall (5,448); Annapolis, MD
Feb 20, 2019; 7:00 pm		at Lehigh	L 81−91	12−16 (7−8)	Stabler Arena (603); Bethlehem, PA
Feb 24, 2019; 1:00 pm		American	L 66−77	12−17 (7−9)	Christl Arena (1,091); West Point, NY
Feb 27, 2019; 7:00 pm		Loyola (MD)	W 79−69	13−17 (8−9)	Christl Arena (543); West Point, NY
Mar 2, 2019; 12:00 pm		at Bucknell	L 61−62	13−18 (8−10)	Sojka Pavilion (2,982); Lewisburg, PA
Patriot League tournament
Mar 7, 2019; 7:00 pm	(6)	at (3) Lehigh; Quarterfinals	L 70–75	13−19	Stabler Arena (1,546); Bethlehem, PA
*Non-conference game. ^{#}Rankings from AP Poll. (#) Tournament seedings in parentheses. All times are in Eastern Time.
