= 2018–19 Monmouth Hawks men's basketball team =

American college basketball season

2018–19 Monmouth Hawks men's basketball
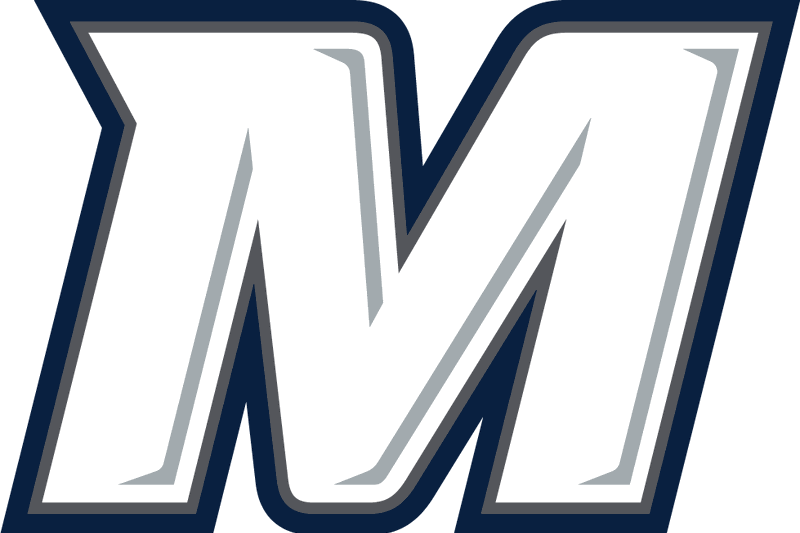
- Conference: Metro Atlantic Athletic Conference
- Record: 14–21 (10–8 MAAC)
- Head coach: King Rice (8th season)
- Assistant coaches: Rick Callahan; Jamal Meeks; JR Reid
- Home arena: OceanFirst Bank Center

2018–19 MAAC men's basketball standings
	Conf.				Overall
Team	W		L	PCT	W		L	PCT
Iona †	12	–	6	.667	17	–	16	.515
Canisius	11	–	7	.611	15	–	17	.469
Quinnipiac	11	–	7	.611	16	–	15	.516
Rider	11	–	7	.611	16	–	15	.516
Siena	11	–	7	.611	17	–	16	.515
Monmouth	10	–	8	.556	14	–	21	.400
Manhattan	8	–	10	.444	11	–	21	.344
Marist	7	–	11	.389	12	–	19	.387
Saint Peter's	6	–	12	.333	10	–	22	.313
Fairfield	6	–	12	.333	9	–	22	.290
Niagara	6	–	12	.333	13	–	19	.406
† 2019 MAAC tournament winner

The 2018–19 Monmouth Hawks men's basketball team represented Monmouth University in the 2018–19 NCAA Division I men's basketball season. They played their home games at OceanFirst Bank Center in West Long Branch, New Jersey as members of the Metro Atlantic Athletic Conference, and were led by 8th-year head coach King Rice. They finished the 2018–19 season 14–21 overall, 10–8 in MAAC play to finish in 6th place. As the 6th seed in the 2019 MAAC tournament, they defeated No. 11 seed Niagara in the first round 76–72, upset No. 3 seed Quinnipiac 98–92 in the quarterfinals, upset No. 2 seed Canisius 73–59 in the semifinals before losing to No. 1 seed Iona, 60–81 in the championship game.

== Previous season ==
The Hawks finished the 2017–18 season 11–20, 7–11 in MAAC play to finish in a tie for seventh place. They lost in the first round of the MAAC tournament to Saint Peter's.

== Roster ==
2018–19 Monmouth Hawks men's basketball team
Players
Coaches

Pos.	#	Name	Height	Weight	Year	Previous school	Hometown
G	0	Ray Salnave	6 ft 3 in (1.91 m)	205 lb (93 kg)	RS So	Benjamin N. Cardozo	Elmont, NY
F	2	Melik Martin	6 ft 6 in (1.98 m)	200 lb (91 kg)	So	York Catholic	York, PA
G	3	Deion Hammond	6 ft 4 in (1.93 m)	200 lb (91 kg)	So	Riverdale Baptist School	Mitchellville, MD
F	4	Mustapha Traore	6 ft 8 in (2.03 m)	210 lb (95 kg)	RS Jr	The Phelps School	Philadelphia, PA
G	5	Nick Rutherford	6 ft 3 in (1.91 m)	185 lb (84 kg)	RS Jr	Florida Atlantic	Indianapolis, IN
G	10	Trevon Gross Jr.	6 ft 3 in (1.91 m)	205 lb (93 kg)	GS	Virginia	Jackson, NJ
G	11	George Papas	6 ft 5 in (1.96 m)	175 lb (79 kg)	So	Union Catholic	Jersey City, NJ
G	13	Marcus McClary	6 ft 3 in (1.91 m)	195 lb (88 kg)	So	The Patrick School	Linden, NJ
G	14	Dave Calloway Jr.	6 ft 0 in (1.83 m)	170 lb (77 kg)	Fr	St. Rose	Neptune, NJ
G	15	Mike James Jr.	6 ft 0 in (1.83 m)	170 lb (77 kg)	Fr	Malverne	West Hempstead, NY
F	21	Nikkei Rutty	6 ft 8 in (2.03 m)	225 lb (102 kg)	Fr	Trinity-Pawling School	New Rochelle, NY
G	24	Louie Pillari	6 ft 6 in (1.98 m)	200 lb (91 kg)	Jr	Christian Brothers Academy	Tinton Falls, NJ
G	25	Samuel Chaput	6 ft 0 in (1.83 m)	175 lb (79 kg)	Fr	St. Anthony Catholic	Longueuil, QC
C	32	Diago Quinn	6 ft 9 in (2.06 m)	255 lb (116 kg)	Sr	Lake Forest Academy	New York City, NY
C	44	Sam Ibiezugbe	6 ft 11 in (2.11 m)	245 lb (111 kg)	Jr	The Masters School	Simsbury, CT

Head coach

- King Rice (North Carolina)

Assistant coach(es)

- Rick Callahan (Salem International)
- Jamal Meeks (Indiana)
- JR Reid (North Carolina)

Legend

- (C) Team captain
- (S) Suspended
- (I) Ineligible
- (W) Walk-on
- Injured
- Current redshirt

Roster
Last update: December 28, 2018

== Schedule and results ==
Date time, TV	Rank^{#}	Opponent^{#}	Result	Record	Site (attendance) city, state
Exhibition
October 27, 2018*; 3:00 pm		Caldwell	W 85–84		OceanFirst Bank Center (774); West Long Branch, New Jersey
Non-conference regular season
November 6, 2018*; 8:30 pm		Lehigh	L 61–85	0–1	OceanFirst Bank Center (2,224); West Long Branch, New Jersey
November 9, 2018*; 7:00 pm, Watch Stadium		at Colgate	L 74–87	0–2	Cotterell Court (359); Hamilton, New York
November 12, 2018*; 7:00 pm, ESPN+		at Saint Joseph's	L 63–78	0–3	Hagan Arena (2,494); Philadelphia, Pennsylvania
November 15, 2018*; 7:00 pm, ESPNU		vs. West Virginia; Myrtle Beach Invitational Quarterfinals	L 53–71	0–4	HTC Center (3,307); Conway, South Carolina
November 16, 2018*; 6:30 pm, ESPN3		vs. Valparaiso; Myrtle Beach Invitational consolation semifinals	L 53–64	0–5	HTC Center (2,830); Conway, South Carolina
November 18, 2018*; 12:30 pm, ESPN3		vs. Cal State Fullerton; Myrtle Beach Invitational 7th place game	L 63–87	0–6	HTC Center (780); Conway, South Carolina
November 24, 2018*; 3:00 pm, ESPN+		Princeton	L 57–60	0–7	OceanFirst Bank Center (2,050); West Long Branch, New Jersey
November 28, 2018*; 8:30 pm, SECN		at No. 10 Kentucky	L 44–90	0–8	Rupp Arena (18,680); Lexington, Kentucky
December 1, 2018*; 2:00 pm, Watch Stadium		at Bucknell	L 43–65	0–9	Sojka Pavilion (2,579); Lewisburg, Pennsylvania
December 5, 2018*; 7:00 pm		at Hofstra	L 73–75	0–10	Mack Sports Complex (1,547); Hempstead, New York
December 8, 2018*; 7:00 pm, WatchESPN		at Albany	L 63–82	0–11	SEFCU Arena (1,902); Albany, New York
December 20, 2018*; 7:00 pm, ESPN+		Yale	L 58–66	0–12	OceanFirst Bank Center (1,747); West Long Branch, New Jersey
December 31, 2018*; 1:00 pm, ESPN+		at Penn	W 76–74 ^{OT}	1–12	The Palestra (2,364); Philadelphia, Pennsylvania
MAAC regular season
January 3, 2019; 7:00 pm, ESPN3		at Iona	L 84–103	1–13 (0–1)	Hynes Athletic Center (1,057); New Rochelle, New York
January 5, 2019; 2:00 pm, ESPN3		Saint Peter's	W 61–44	2–13 (1–1)	OceanFirst Bank Center (2,006); West Long Branch, New Jersey
January 10, 2019; 7:00 pm, ESPN3		at Quinnipiac	L 83–89 ^{2OT}	2–14 (1–2)	People's United Center (916); Hamden, Connecticut
January 12, 2019; 2:00 pm, ESPN3		Manhattan	W 65–49	3–14 (2–2)	OceanFirst Bank Center (1,745); West Long Branch, New Jersey
January 14, 2019; 7:00 pm, ESPN3		at Siena	W 63–60 ^{OT}	4–14 (3–2)	Times Union Center (5,592); Albany, New York
January 17, 2019; 7:00 pm, ESPN3		Fairfield	W 74–57	5–14 (4–2)	OceanFirst Bank Center (1,722); West Long Branch, New Jersey
January 20, 2019; 1:00 pm, ESPN3		Iona	W 83–81	6–14 (5–2)	OceanFirst Bank Center (1,739); West Long Branch, New Jersey
January 24, 2019; 7:00 pm		at Canisius	L 66–80	6–15 (5–3)	Koessler Athletic Center (1,221); Buffalo, New York
January 26, 2019; 3:00 pm		at Niagara	L 48–75	6–16 (5–4)	Gallagher Center (956); Lewiston, New York
January 31, 2019; 7:00 pm, ESPN3		Siena	W 66–55	7–16 (6–4)	OceanFirst Bank Center (1,743); West Long Branch, New Jersey
February 2, 2019; 2:00 pm, ESPN+		Rider	W 75–71	8–16 (7–4)	OceanFirst Bank Center (2,386); West Long Branch, New Jersey
February 7, 2019; 7:00 pm		at Saint Peter's	W 53–51	9–16 (8–4)	Yanitelli Center (877); Jersey City, New Jersey
February 9, 2019; 1:00 pm, ESPN3		at Fairfield	W 61–49	10–16 (9–4)	Webster Bank Arena (1,281); Bridgeport, Connecticut
February 15, 2019; 7:00 pm, ESPN+		at Rider	L 72–81	10–17 (9–5)	Alumni Gymnasium (1,650); Lawrenceville, New Jersey
February 17, 2019; 2:00 pm, ESPN+		Marist	L 67–75	10–18 (9–6)	OceanFirst Bank Center (2,818); West Long Branch, New Jersey
February 22, 2019; 7:00 pm, ESPNU		Canisius	L 59–60	10–19 (9–7)	OceanFirst Bank Center (2,625); West Long Branch, New Jersey
February 24, 2019; 2:00 pm, ESPN+		Quinnipiac	L 56–68	10–20 (9–8)	OceanFirst Bank Center (2,546); West Long Branch, New Jersey
March 1, 2019; 7:00 pm, Jaspervision		at Manhattan	W 62–54	11–20 (10–8)	Draddy Gymnasium; Riverdale, New York
MAAC tournament
March 7, 2019; 10:00 pm, ESPN3	(6)	vs. (11) Niagara; First Round	W 76-72	12-20	Times Union Center; Albany, New York
March 9, 2019; 7:00 pm, ESPN3	(6)	vs. (3) Quinnipiac; Quarterfinals	W 98–92	13–20	Times Union Center (2,260); Albany, New York
March 10, 2019; 8:30 pm, ESPNU	(6)	vs. (2) Canisius; Semifinals	W 73–59	14–20	Times Union Center (4,918); Albany, New York
March 11, 2019; 9:00 pm, ESPN2	(6)	vs. (1) Iona; Championship	L 60–81	14–21	Times Union Center (2,123); Albany, New York
*Non-conference game. ^{#}Rankings from AP Poll. (#) Tournament seedings in parentheses. All times are in Eastern.
