= Rapolas Ivanauskas =

Lithuanian basketball player

No. 25 – Fukui Blowinds
- Position: Power forward
- League: B.League

Personal information
- Born: February 15, 1998 (age 28) Kaunas, Lithuania
- Listed height: 6 ft 10 in (2.08 m)
- Listed weight: 235 lb (107 kg)

Career information
- High school: Barrington (Barrington, Illinois); Brewster Academy (Wolfeboro, New Hampshire)
- College: Northwestern (2017–2018); Colgate (2018–2020); Cincinnati (2020)
- Playing career: 2021–present

Career history
- 2021: Rytas Vilnius
- 2021–2022: Labas Gas Prienai
- 2022–2023: ERA Nymburk
- 2023: ABC Athletic Constanța
- 2023–2025: Fukushima Firebonds
- 2025–present: Fukui Blowinds

Career highlights
- Patriot League Player of the Year (2019); First-team All-Patriot League (2019); Second-team All-Patriot League (2020)

Rapolas Ivanauskas (born February 15, 1998) is a Lithuanian professional basketball player. He played college basketball for the Northwestern Wildcats, the Colgate Raiders, and the Cincinnati Bearcats.

== College career ==
As a sophomore at Colgate, Ivanauskas averaged 15.9 points, 7.8 rebounds and 1.6 assists per game and made 43 3-pointers. He was named the Patriot League Player of the Year for the 2018–19 season. As a junior, Ivanauskas was named to the Second Team All-Patriot League. Ivanauskas averaged 13.1 points and 7.6 rebounds per game for the Colgate Raiders. Following the season, he decided to transfer to Cincinnati for his final season of eligibility. In December 2020, Ivanauskas opted out of playing the remainder of the 2020–21 season at Cincinnati. He had played in seven games and recorded a team-high 31 defensive rebounds during that span.

== Professional career ==
On January 25, 2021, he announced that he had signed with Rytas Vilnius, a professional club in his home country of Lithuania. Ivanauskas averaged 3.0 points and 1.7 rebounds per game. On August 18, 2021, he signed with BC CBet Prienai.

On August 5, 2022, he signed with ERA Nymburk in the Czech Republic.

On June 9, 2023, Ivanauskas signed with Fukushima Firebonds of the Japanese B.League.

== Career statistics ==
Legend
GP	Games played	GS	Games started	MPG	Minutes per game
FG%	Field goal percentage	3P%	3-point field goal percentage	FT%	Free throw percentage
RPG	Rebounds per game	APG	Assists per game	SPG	Steals per game
BPG	Blocks per game	PPG	Points per game	**Bold**	Career high

=== College ===
Year	Team	GP	GS	MPG	FG%	3P%	FT%	RPG	APG	SPG	BPG	PPG
2016–17	Northwestern	Redshirt										
2017–18	Northwestern	3	0	3.7	.000	–	–	1.0	.0	.0	.0	.0
2018–19	Colgate	**35**	**35**	**30.2**	**.518**	**.434**	**.777**	**7.8**	1.6	.5	**.6**	**15.9**
2019–20	Colgate	34	34	29.1	.432	.263	.602	7.6	**2.1**	.6	.5	13.1
2020–21	Cincinnati	7	3	21.4	.474	.235	.667	5.0	.3	**.7**	.0	6.3
Career		79	72	27.9	.473	.333	.701	7.2	1.6	.6	.5	13.3
