= 2018–19 Loyola Greyhounds men's basketball team =

American college basketball season

2018–19 Loyola Greyhounds men's basketball
- Conference: Patriot League
- Record: 11–21 (7–11 Patriot)
- Head coach: Tavaras Hardy (1st season)
- Assistant coaches: A.J. Guyton; Ivo Simović; Brenden Straughn
- Home arena: Reitz Arena

2018–19 Patriot League men's basketball standings
	Conf.				Overall
Team	W		L	PCT	W		L	PCT
Colgate †	13	–	5	.722	24	–	11	.686
Bucknell	13	–	5	.722	21	–	12	.636
Lehigh	12	–	6	.667	20	–	11	.645
American	9	–	9	.500	15	–	15	.500
Navy	8	–	10	.444	12	–	19	.387
Army	8	–	10	.444	13	–	19	.406
Lafayette	7	–	11	.389	10	–	20	.333
Boston University	7	–	11	.389	15	–	18	.455
Loyola (MD)	7	–	11	.389	11	–	21	.344
Holy Cross	6	–	12	.333	16	–	17	.485
† 2019 Patriot League tournament winner

The 2018–19 Loyola Greyhounds men's basketball team represented Loyola University Maryland during the 2018–19 NCAA Division I men's basketball season. The Greyhounds, led by first-year head coach Tavaras Hardy, played their home games at Reitz Arena in Baltimore, Maryland as members of the Patriot League. They finished the season 11–21, 7–11 in Patriot League play to finish in a tie for seventh place. As the No. 9 seed in the Patriot League tournament, they lost Boston University in the first round.

== Previous season ==
The Greyhounds finished the 2017–18 season 9–22, 6–12 in Patriot League play to finish in a tie for eighth place. They defeated Army in the first round of the Patriot League tournament before losing in the quarterfinals to Bucknell.

On March 8, 2018, the school announced G. G. Smith had resigned as head coach. He finished at Loyola with a five-year record of 56–98. On March 28, the Greyhounds hired Georgia Tech assistant coach Tavaras Hardy for the head coaching job.

== Offseason ==
=== Departures ===
Name	Number	Pos.	Height	Weight	Year	Hometown	Reason for departure
Andre Walker	2	G	6'0"	173	Sophomore	Westbury, NY	Graduated
Nevell Provo	4	G	6'0"	186	Junior	North Preston, NS	Graduate transferred to Saint Mary's
River Reed	11	F	6'8"	212	Freshman	San Antonio, TX	Transferred to Collin College
Matt Staubi	20	G	5'8"	156	Senior	Rye, NY	Graduated
Cam Gregory	22	F	6'8"	224	Senior	Waldorf, MD	Graduated
Chancellor Barnard	35	F	6'4"	192	Senior	Columbia, MD	Graduated
Ian Langendoerfer	41	G	6'5"	224	Sophomore	Honesdale, PA	Graduate transferred to West Chester

=== 2018 recruiting class ===
College recruiting
Name	Hometown	School	Height	Weight	Commit date
Kenny Jones #76 PG	Middletown, NJ	Mater Dei High School	6 ft 1 in (1.85 m)	170 lb (77 kg)	Sep 19, 2017
Kenny Jones #76 PG	Recruit ratings: Scout: Rivals: (76)				
Jan Dornik; SG	Kranj, Slovenia	Gimnazija Franceta Prešerna Kranj	6 ft 6 in (1.98 m)	N/A	May 8, 2018
Jan Dornik; SG	Recruit ratings: Scout: Rivals: (NR)				
Jaylin Andrews; SG	Baltimore, MD	Boys' Latin School of Maryland	6 ft 4 in (1.93 m)	175 lb (79 kg)	Apr 8, 2018
Jaylin Andrews; SG	Recruit ratings: Scout: Rivals: (NR)				
Casmir Ochiaka; PF	Elizabeth, NJ	St. Mary of the Assumption High School	6 ft 7 in (2.01 m)	220 lb (100 kg)	Jul 21, 2017
Casmir Ochiaka; PF	Recruit ratings: Scout: Rivals: (NR)				
Overall recruit ranking:
Note: In many cases, Scout, Rivals, 247Sports, On3, and ESPN may conflict in their listings of height and weight.; In these cases, the average was taken. ESPN grades are on a 100-point scale.; Sources: "2018 Team Ranking". Rivals.

=== 2019 recruiting class ===
College recruiting (2019)
Name	Hometown	School	Height	Weight	Commit date
Cameron Spencer; SG	Davidsonville, MD	Boys Latin High School	6 ft 3 in (1.91 m)	190 lb (86 kg)	Aug 3, 2018
Cameron Spencer; SG	Recruit ratings: Scout: Rivals: (NR)				
Overall recruit ranking:
Note: In many cases, Scout, Rivals, 247Sports, On3, and ESPN may conflict in their listings of height and weight.; In these cases, the average was taken. ESPN grades are on a 100-point scale.; Sources: "2019 Team Ranking". Rivals.

== Roster ==
2018–19 Loyola Greyhounds men's basketball team
Players
Coaches

Pos.	#	Name	Height	Weight	Year	Previous school	Hometown
G	0	Isaiah Hart	5 ft 11 in (1.8 m)	181 lb (82 kg)	So	Whitefield Academy	Morrow, GA
F	1	KaVaughn Scott	6 ft 8 in (2.03 m)	223 lb (101 kg)	Jr	OC Lutheran HS	Irvine, CA
G	2	Jaylin Andrews	6 ft 4 in (1.93 m)	171 lb (78 kg)	Fr	Boys' Latin School of Maryland	Owings Mills, MD
G	3	Luke Johnson	6 ft 3 in (1.91 m)	174 lb (79 kg)	So	Lexington Catholic HS	Lexington, KY
G	5	James Fives	6 ft 6 in (1.98 m)	196 lb (89 kg)	So	The Hill School	Scranton, PA
G	10	Andrew Kostecka III	6 ft 4 in (1.93 m)	180 lb (82 kg)	Jr	Clarksburg HS	Germantown, MD
G	11	Brandon Bradsher	5 ft 10 in (1.78 m)	174 lb (79 kg)	So	Boys' Latin School of Maryland	Ellicott City, MD
G	14	Chuck Champion	6 ft 4 in (1.93 m)	187 lb (85 kg)	Jr	Friends' Central School	Philadelphia, PA
G	15	Sam Norton (W)	6 ft 4 in (1.93 m)	199 lb (90 kg)	Sr	The Hill School	Collegeville, PA
F	21	Ethan Norton (W)	6 ft 4 in (1.93 m)	162 lb (73 kg)	So	The Hill School	Collegeville, PA
F	22	Casmir Ochiaka	6 ft 8 in (2.03 m)	226 lb (103 kg)	Fr	St. Mary of the Assumption (NJ)	Enugu, Nigeria
F	23	Brent Holcombe	6 ft 8 in (2.03 m)	198 lb (90 kg)	So	Coral Reef HS	Miami, FL
F	24	Jan Dornik	6 ft 6 in (1.98 m)	193 lb (88 kg)	Fr	Gymnasium France Preseren Kranj	Kranj, Slovenia
G	25	Kenny Jones	6 ft 0 in (1.83 m)	171 lb (78 kg)	Fr	Mater Dei Prep	Hillside, NJ

Head coach

- Tavaras Hardy (Northwestern)

Assistant coach(es)

- A.J. Guyton (Indiana)
- Brenden Straughn (Hood)
- Ivo Simović (Union (Serbia))

Legend

- (C) Team captain
- (S) Suspended
- (I) Ineligible
- (W) Walk-on
- Injured
- Current redshirt

Roster
Last update: October 18, 2018

== Schedule and results ==
Date time, TV	Rank^{#}	Opponent^{#}	Result	Record	Site (attendance) city, state
Exhibition
Nov 1, 2018*; 7:00 pm, Patriot League Network		John Jay	W 88–69		Reitz Arena; Baltimore, MD
Non-conference regular season
Nov 6, 2018*; 6:30 pm, FSN/MASN2		at St. John's; Legends Classic campus game	L 55–76	0–1	Carnesecca Arena (4,863); Queens, NY
Nov 11, 2018*; 5:00 pm, Stadium		Dartmouth	L 80–82	0–2	Reitz Arena (1,114); Baltimore, MD
Nov 13, 2018*; 7:00 pm		Delaware State	W 91–62	1–2	Reitz Arena (914); Baltimore, MD
Nov 16, 2018*; 7:00 pm		at Temple; Legends Classic campus game	L 67–81	1–3	Liacouras Center (4,815); Philadelphia, PA
Nov 19, 2018*; 7:30 pm		at Detroit; Legends Classic subregional semifinals	L 63–91	1–4	Calihan Hall (1,343); Detroit, MI
Nov 20, 2018*; 5:00 pm		vs. Hampton; Legends Classic 3rd place game	W 75–66	2–4	Calihan Hall (1,367); Detroit, MI
Nov 25, 2018*; 6:00 pm		at Towson	L 69–85	2–5	SECU Arena (1,058); Towson, MD
Dec 1, 2018*; 1:00 pm, MASN		Mount St. Mary's	W 75–65	3–5	Reitz Arena (1,244); Baltimore, MD
Dec 5, 2018*; 7:00 pm		at Drexel	L 86–95	3–6	Daskalakis Athletic Center (894); Philadelphia, PA
Dec 8, 2018*; 8:00 pm, ESPN+		at Binghamton	W 83–65	4–6	Binghamton University Events Center (2,748); Vestal, NY
Dec 11, 2018*; 7:00 pm, BTN		at Maryland	L 71–94	4–7	Xfinity Center (11,595); College Park, MD
Dec 21, 2018*; 7:00 pm, ESPN+		at UMass Lowell	L 79–97	4–8	Costello Athletic Center (706); Lowell, MA
Dec 28, 2018*; 7:00 pm, ACCN Extra		at No. 20 NC State	L 64–97	4–9	PNC Arena (15,098); Raleigh, NC
Patriot League regular season
Jan 3, 2019; 7:00 pm		Holy Cross	L 73–80	4–10 (0–1)	Reitz Arena (409); Baltimore, MD
Jan 6, 2019; 2:00 pm		at Lehigh	L 72–89	4–11 (0–2)	Stabler Arena (890); Bethlehem, PA
Jan 9, 2019; 7:00 pm		at Lafayette	L 70–85	4–12 (0–3)	Kirby Sports Center (1,109); Easton, PA
Jan 12, 2019; 2:00 pm, Stadium		at Army	W 66–64	5–12 (1–3)	Reitz Arena (818); Baltimore, MD
Jan 16, 2019; 7:00 pm		Boston University	W 81–73 ^{OT}	6–12 (2–3)	Reitz Arena (810); Baltimore, MD
Jan 19, 2019; 12:00 pm		at Holy Cross	W 67–65 ^{OT}	7–12 (3–3)	Hart Center (958); Worcester, MA
Jan 23, 2019; 7:00 pm		at Bucknell	L 68–71	7–13 (3–4)	Sojka Pavilion (2,243); Lewisburg, PA
Jan 26, 2019; 12:00 pm, CBSSN		Colgate	W 79–72 ^{OT}	8–13 (4–4)	Reitz Arena (684); Baltimore, MD
Jan 30, 2019; 7:00 pm		American	L 68–74	8–14 (4–5)	Reitz Arena (484); Baltimore, MD
Feb 2, 2019; 7:00 pm		Navy	L 68–71	8–15 (4–6)	Alumni Hall (1,554); Annapolis, MD
Feb 6, 2019; 7:00 pm		Bucknell	L 72–84	8–16 (4–7)	Reitz Arena (730); Baltimore, MD
Feb 9, 2019; 4:00 pm		at Colgate	L 72–75	8–17 (4–8)	Cotterell Court (532); Hamilton, NY
Feb 13, 2019; 7:00 pm		American	W 86–84	9–17 (5–8)	Bender Arena (681); Washington, D.C.
Feb 17, 2018; 2:00 pm		Lafayette	L 64–69	9–18 (5–9)	Reitz Arena (879); Baltimore, MD
Feb 21, 2019; 2:00 pm		Navy	W 79–70	10–18 (6–9)	Reitz Arena (243); Baltimore, MD
Feb 23, 2019; 4:30 pm		at Boston University	L 65–72	10–19 (6–10)	Case Gym (1,054); Boston, MA
Feb 27, 2019; 7:00 pm		at Army	L 69–79	10–20 (6–11)	Christl Arena (543); West Point, NY
Mar 2, 2019; 7:00 pm		Lehigh	W 92–73	11–20 (7–11)	Reitz Arena (504); Baltimore, MD
Patriot League tournament
Mar 5, 2019; 7:00 pm	(9)	(8) Boston University; First round	L 63–71	11–21	Case Gym; Boston, MA
*Non-conference game. ^{#}Rankings from AP Poll. (#) Tournament seedings in parentheses. All times are in Eastern Time.
