= 2019 Patriot League men's basketball tournament =

- Classification: Division I
- Season: 2018–19
- Teams: 10
- Site: Campus sites
- Champions: Colgate (3rd title)
- Winning coach: Matt Langel (1st title)
- MVP: Jordan Burns (Colgate)
- Television: PLN, CBSSN

2018–19 Patriot League men's basketball standings
	Conf.				Overall
Team	W		L	PCT	W		L	PCT
Colgate †	13	–	5	.722	24	–	11	.686
Bucknell	13	–	5	.722	21	–	12	.636
Lehigh	12	–	6	.667	20	–	11	.645
American	9	–	9	.500	15	–	15	.500
Navy	8	–	10	.444	12	–	19	.387
Army	8	–	10	.444	13	–	19	.406
Lafayette	7	–	11	.389	10	–	20	.333
Boston University	7	–	11	.389	15	–	18	.455
Loyola (MD)	7	–	11	.389	11	–	21	.344
Holy Cross	6	–	12	.333	16	–	17	.485
† 2019 Patriot League tournament winner

The 2019 Patriot League men's basketball tournament was the postseason tournament for the Patriot League during the 2018–19 NCAA Division I men's basketball season. It was held on March 5, 7, 10, and 13, with the higher seed in each match up hosting at their respective campus sites. No. 1 seed Colgate defeated Bucknell 94–80 in the championship game to win the conference tournament championship, and the conference's automatic bid to the 2019 NCAA tournament. It was Colgate's first Patriot League tournament championship since 1996, and third overall.

== Seeds ==
All 10 Patriot League teams were eligible for the tournament. The top six teams received a first round bye. Teams were seeded by record within the conference, with a tiebreaker system to seed teams with identical conference records.

Seed	School	Conf	Tiebreaker 1	Tiebreaker 2	Tiebreaker 3
1	Colgate	13–5	1–1 vs Bucknell	2–0 vs Lehigh	2–0 vs American
2	Bucknell	13–5	1–1 vs Colgate	2–0 vs Lehigh	1–1 vs American
3	Lehigh	12–6			
4	American	9–9			
5	Navy	8–10	1–1 vs. Army	1–1 vs. Colgate	1–1 vs. Bucknell
6	Army	8–10	1–1 vs. Navy	1–1 vs. Colgate	0–2 vs. Bucknell
7	Lafayette	7–11	3–1 vs. BU/Loyola (MD)		
8	Boston	7–11	2–2 vs. Lafayette/Loyola (MD)		
9	Loyola (MD)	7–11	1–3 vs. Lafayette/BU		
10	Holy Cross	6–12			

== Schedule ==
Game	Time*	Matchup	Score	Attendance	Television
First round – Tuesday, March 5
1	7:00 pm	No. 9 Loyola (MD) at No. 8 Boston	63–71	462	PLN
2	7:00 pm	No. 10 Holy Cross at No. 7 Lafayette	79–74	1,004	PLN
Quarterfinals – Thursday, March 7
3	7:00 pm	No. 8 Boston at No. 1 Colgate	69–81	1,277	PLN
4	7:00 pm	No. 5 Navy at No. 4 American	60–56		PLN
5	7:00 pm	No. 6 Army at No. 3 Lehigh	70–75	1,546	PLN
6	7:00 pm	No. 10 Holy Cross at No. 2 Bucknell	65–77	2,107	PLN
Semifinals – Sunday, March 10
7	12:00 pm	No. 5 Navy at No. 1 Colgate	70–80	1,089	CBSSN
8	2:00 pm	No. 3 Lehigh at No. 2 Bucknell	75–97	2,718	CBSSN
Championship – Wednesday, March 13
9	7:30 pm	No. 2 Bucknell at No. 1 Colgate	80–94		CBSSN
*Game times in ET. Rankings denote tournament seeding. All games hosted by higher-seeded team.

== Bracket ==
First round March 5 Patriot League Network
8	Boston	71
9	Loyola (MD)	63
7	Lafayette	74
10	Holy Cross	79

Quarterfinals; March 7 Patriot League Network
1	Colgate	81
8	Boston	69
4	American	56
5	Navy	60
2	Bucknell	77
10	Holy Cross	65
3	Lehigh	75
6	Army	70

Semifinals; March 10; CBS Sports Network
1	Colgate	80
5	Navy	70
2	Bucknell	97
3	Lehigh	75

Championship; March 13; CBS Sports Network
1	Colgate	94
2	Bucknell	80
