= 2018–19 Lehigh Mountain Hawks men's basketball team =

American college basketball season

2018–19 Lehigh Mountain Hawks men's basketball
- Conference: Patriot League
- Record: 20–11 (12–6 Patriot)
- Head coach: Brett Reed (12th season)
- Assistant coaches: Antoni Wyche; Harry Morra; Noel Hightower
- Home arena: Stabler Arena

2018–19 Patriot League men's basketball standings
	Conf.				Overall
Team	W		L	PCT	W		L	PCT
Colgate †	13	–	5	.722	24	–	11	.686
Bucknell	13	–	5	.722	21	–	12	.636
Lehigh	12	–	6	.667	20	–	11	.645
American	9	–	9	.500	15	–	15	.500
Navy	8	–	10	.444	12	–	19	.387
Army	8	–	10	.444	13	–	19	.406
Lafayette	7	–	11	.389	10	–	20	.333
Boston University	7	–	11	.389	15	–	18	.455
Loyola (MD)	7	–	11	.389	11	–	21	.344
Holy Cross	6	–	12	.333	16	–	17	.485
† 2019 Patriot League tournament winner

The 2018–19 Lehigh Mountain Hawks men's basketball team represented Lehigh University during the 2018–19 NCAA Division I men's basketball season. The Mountain Hawks, led by 12th-year head coach Brett Reed, played their home games at Stabler Arena in Bethlehem, Pennsylvania as members of the Patriot League.

== Previous season ==
The Mountain Hawks finished the 2017–18 season 16–14, 11–7 in Patriot League play to finish in a tie for third place. They lost in the quarterfinals of the Patriot League tournament to Boston University.

== Offseason ==
=== Departures ===
Name	Number	Pos.	Height	Weight	Year	Hometown	Reason for departure
Kahron Ross	1	G	5'11"	160	Senior	Jonesboro, AR	Graduated

=== 2018 recruiting class ===
College recruiting information
Name	Hometown	School	Height	Weight	Commit date
Nic Lynch #51 C	Seattle, WA	Seattle Prep	6 ft 9 in (2.06 m)	265 lb (120 kg)	Oct 25, 2017
Nic Lynch #51 C	Recruit ratings: Scout: Rivals: 247Sports: (75)				
Jeameril Wilson; SF	Chicago, IL	Woodstock Academy	6 ft 5 in (1.96 m)	195 lb (88 kg)	Mar 22, 2018
Jeameril Wilson; SF	Recruit ratings: Scout: Rivals: (NR)				
Overall recruit ranking:
Note: In many cases, Scout, Rivals, 247Sports, On3, and ESPN may conflict in their listings of height and weight.; In these cases, the average was taken. ESPN grades are on a 100-point scale.; Sources: "2018 Team Ranking". Rivals.

=== 2019 recruiting class ===
College recruiting information (2019)
Name	Hometown	School	Height	Weight	Commit date
Jakob Alamudun; SF	Huntington Beach, CA	Marina High School	6 ft 5 in (1.96 m)	190 lb (86 kg)	Sep 9, 2018
Jakob Alamudun; SF	Recruit ratings: Scout: Rivals: (NR)				
Reed Fenton; SG	Pittsburgh, PA	Greater Latrobe High School	6 ft 4 in (1.93 m)	165 lb (75 kg)	Sep 21, 2018
Reed Fenton; SG	Recruit ratings: Scout: Rivals: (NR)				
Jake Betlow; PG	Montverde, FL	St. Benedict Prep	6 ft 0 in (1.83 m)	165 lb (75 kg)	Apr 29, 2018
Jake Betlow; PG	Recruit ratings: Scout: Rivals: (NR)				
Overall recruit ranking:
Note: In many cases, Scout, Rivals, 247Sports, On3, and ESPN may conflict in their listings of height and weight.; In these cases, the average was taken. ESPN grades are on a 100-point scale.; Sources: "2019 Team Ranking". Rivals.

== Roster ==
2018–19 Lehigh Mountain Hawks men's basketball team
Players
Coaches

Pos.	#	Name	Height	Weight	Year	Previous school	Hometown
G	0	Caleb Bennett	6 ft 5 in (1.96 m)	190 lb (86 kg)	So	Lafayette HS	St. Joseph, MO
F	1	Jeameril Wilson	6 ft 7 in (2.01 m)	200 lb (91 kg)	Fr	Woodstock Academy/Notre Dame Prep	Chicago, IL
G	2	Kyle Leufroy	6 ft 3 in (1.91 m)	195 lb (88 kg)	Sr	Benicia HS/Prolific Prep	Pasadena, CA
F	4	Joe Foley (W)	6 ft 3 in (1.91 m)	180 lb (82 kg)	Fr	Menlo School	Atherton, CA
G	5	Lance Tejada	6 ft 2 in (1.88 m)	190 lb (86 kg)	RS Sr	Blanche Ely HS; East Carolina	Miramar, FL
G	10	Zed Farrell (W)	6 ft 1 in (1.85 m)	—	Fr		Harlem, PA
G	11	Jordan Cohen	6 ft 1 in (1.85 m)	185 lb (84 kg)	Jr	Campbell Hall HS	Tarzana, CA
C	13	James Karnik	6 ft 9 in (2.06 m)	225 lb (102 kg)	So	Orangeville Prep	Surrey, BC
G	20	Marques Wilson	6 ft 4 in (1.93 m)	210 lb (95 kg)	So	Edmond North HS	Edmond, OK
F	21	Shane Acoveno	6 ft 6 in (1.98 m)	200 lb (91 kg)	So	Delaware Valley HS	Milford, PA
F	25	Ed Porter	6 ft 7 in (2.01 m)	215 lb (98 kg)	Jr	Eastside HS	Hawthorne, FL
F	31	Pat Andree	6 ft 8 in (2.03 m)	225 lb (102 kg)	Jr	Christian Brothers Academy	Colts Neck, NJ
C	40	Josh Wolf	6 ft 10 in (2.08 m)	225 lb (102 kg)	Jr	Williston Northampton HS	Glencoe, IL
C	42	Jack Lieb	6 ft 10 in (2.08 m)	245 lb (111 kg)	Jr	Brewster Academy	Deerfield, IL
C	44	Nic Lynch	6 ft 10 in (2.08 m)	255 lb (116 kg)	Fr	Seattle Prep	Seattle, WA

Head coach

- Brett Reed (Wayne State (MI))

Assistant coach(es)

- Antoni Wyche (Notre Dame)
- Harry Morra (DeSales)
- Noel Hightower (Chestnut Hill)

Legend

- (C) Team captain
- (S) Suspended
- (I) Ineligible
- (W) Walk-on
- Injured
- Current redshirt

Roster

== Schedule and results ==
Date time, TV	Rank^{#}	Opponent^{#}	Result	Record	Site (attendance) city, state
Non-conference regular season
Nov 6, 2018*; 8:30 pm, ESPN3		at Monmouth	W 85–61	1–0	OceanFirst Bank Center (2,224); West Long Branch, NJ
Nov 9, 2018*; 7:00 pm, ACCN Extra		at Miami (FL)	L 63–82	1–1	Watsco Center (6,799); Coral Gables, FL
Nov 13, 2018*; 7:00 pm		Marist	W 78–72	2–1	Stabler Arena (681); Bethlehem, PA
Nov 16, 2018*; 8:30 pm		Princeton	W 72–57	3–1	Stabler Arena (1,171); Bethlehem, PA
Nov 21, 2018*; 6:00 pm		at Siena	W 80–69	4–1	Times Union Center (4,908); Albany, NY
Nov 24, 2018*; 4:30 pm, FSKC		at No. 12 Kansas State	L 58–77	4–2	Bramlage Coliseum (8,578); Manhattan, KS
Dec 1, 2018*; 2:00 pm		Arkansas State	W 82–70	5–2	Stabler Arena (837); Bethlehem, PA
Dec 5, 2018*; 7:00 pm, ESPN+		at Yale	L 87–97	5–3	John J. Lee Amphitheater (847); New Haven, CT
Dec 8, 2018*; 4:00 pm		at Mount St. Mary's	W 85–78	6–3	Knott Arena (1,928); Emmitsburg, MD
Dec 22, 2018*; 12:00 pm		Saint Francis (PA)	W 88–76	7–3	Stabler Arena (811); Bethlehem, PA
Dec 30, 2018*; 2:00 pm, ATTSNPT		at West Virginia	L 68–78	7–4	WVU Coliseum (10,754); Morgantown, WV
Patriot League regular season
Jan 2, 2019; 7:00 pm, SETV2		Lafayette	W 86–83	8–4 (1–0)	Stabler Arena (1,309); Bethlehem, PA
Jan 6, 2019; 2:00 pm, SETV2		Loyola (MD)	W 89–72	9–4 (2–0)	Stabler Arena (890); Bethlehem, PA
Jan 9, 2019; 7:00 pm		at Holy Cross	W 99–94 ^{OT}	10–4 (3–0)	Hart Center (1,045); Worcester, MA
Jan 12, 2019; 4:00 pm		at Colgate	L 78–91	10–5 (3–1)	Cotterell Court (399); Hamilton, NY
Jan 16, 2019; 7:00 pm, SETV2		American	W 83–76	11–5 (4–1)	Stabler Arena (1,084); Bethlehem, PA
Jan 19, 2019; 7:00 pm, SETV2		Bucknell	L 83–85	11–6 (4–2)	Stabler Arena (1,558); Bethlehem, PA
Jan 23, 2019; 7:00 pm, Stadium		at Navy	W 85–74	12–6 (5–2)	Alumni Hall (1,294); Annapolis, MD
Jan 26, 2019; 2:00 pm, SETV2		Boston University	W 94–78	13–6 (6–2)	Stabler Arena (1,175); Bethlehem, PA
Jan 30, 2019; 7:00 pm		at Lafayette	W 93–86 ^{OT}	14–6 (7–2)	Kirby Sports Center (1,344); Easton, PA
Feb 2, 2019; 1:00 pm, Stadium		at Army	W 75–70	15–6 (8–2)	Christl Arena (873); West Point, NY
Feb 4, 2019; 7:00 pm, CBSSN		Colgate	L 62–84	15–7 (8–3)	Stabler Arena (966); Bethlehem, PA
Feb 9, 2019; 4:30 pm, SETV2		Navy	W 83–57	16–7 (9–3)	Stabler Arena (1,803); Bethlehem, PA
Feb 11, 2019; 7:00 pm, CBSSN		at Bucknell	L 75–87	16–8 (9–4)	Sojka Pavilion (2,793); Lewisburg, PA
Feb 16, 2019; 4:30 pm		at Boston University	W 84–79	17–8 (10–4)	Case Gym (1,303); Boston, MA
Feb 20, 2019; 7:00 pm, SETV2		Army	W 91–81	18–8 (11–4)	Stabler Arena (603); Bethlehem, PA
Feb 24, 2019; 12:00 pm, SETV2		Holy Cross	L 71–73	18–9 (11–5)	Stabler Arena (2,804); Bethlehem, PA
Feb 27, 2019; 7:00 pm		at American	W 80–66	19–9 (12–5)	Bender Arena (711); Washington, D.C.
Mar 2, 2019; 7:00 pm		at Loyola (MD)	L 73–92	19–10 (12–6)	Reitz Arena (504); Baltimore, MD
Patriot League tournament
Mar 7, 2019; 7:00 pm	(3)	(6) Army; Quarterfinals	W 75–70	20–10	Stabler Arena (1,546); Bethlehem, PA
Mar 10, 2019; 2:00 pm, CBSSN	(3)	at (2) Bucknell; Semifinals	L 75–97	20–11	Sojka Pavilion (2,718); Lewisburg, PA
*Non-conference game. ^{#}Rankings from AP Poll. (#) Tournament seedings in parentheses. All times are in Eastern Time.
