= 2018–19 Lafayette Leopards men's basketball team =

American college basketball season

2018–19 Lafayette Leopards men's basketball
- Conference: Patriot League
- Record: 10–20 (7–11 Patriot)
- Head coach: Fran O'Hanlon (24th season)
- Assistant coaches: Jimmy Fenerty; Jarren Dyson; Justin Burrell
- Home arena: Kirby Sports Center

2018–19 Patriot League men's basketball standings
	Conf.				Overall
Team	W		L	PCT	W		L	PCT
Colgate †	13	–	5	.722	24	–	11	.686
Bucknell	13	–	5	.722	21	–	12	.636
Lehigh	12	–	6	.667	20	–	11	.645
American	9	–	9	.500	15	–	15	.500
Navy	8	–	10	.444	12	–	19	.387
Army	8	–	10	.444	13	–	19	.406
Lafayette	7	–	11	.389	10	–	20	.333
Boston University	7	–	11	.389	15	–	18	.455
Loyola (MD)	7	–	11	.389	11	–	21	.344
Holy Cross	6	–	12	.333	16	–	17	.485
† 2019 Patriot League tournament winner

The 2018–19 Lafayette Leopards men's basketball team represented Lafayette College during the 2018–19 NCAA Division I men's basketball season. The Leopards, led by 24th-year head coach Fran O'Hanlon, played their home games at the Kirby Sports Center in Easton, Pennsylvania as members of the Patriot League.

== Previous season ==
The Leopards finished the 2017–18 season 10–21, 7–11 in Patriot League play to finish in seventh place. They defeated American in the first round of the Patriot League tournament before losing in the quarterfinals to Colgate.

== Offseason ==
=== Departures ===
Name	Number	Pos.	Height	Weight	Year	Hometown	Reason for departure
Eric Stafford	4	G	6'5"	172	Senior	Pitman, NJ	Graduated
Matt Klinewski	13	F	6'8"	235	Senior	Voorhees, NJ	Graduated

=== 2018 recruiting class ===
College recruiting information
Name	Hometown	School	Height	Weight	Commit date
Ronderick Perry; PG	Apopka, FL	Wekiva High School	6 ft 2 in (1.88 m)	162 lb (73 kg)	Dec 7, 2017
Ronderick Perry; PG	Recruit ratings: Scout: Rivals: (NR)				
Isaac Suffren; SG	Charlotte, NC	Providence Day School	6 ft 3 in (1.91 m)	165 lb (75 kg)	Feb 11, 2018
Isaac Suffren; SG	Recruit ratings: Scout: Rivals: (NR)				
Sean Good; C	Camp Hill, PA	Trinity High School	6 ft 10 in (2.08 m)	190 lb (86 kg)	Sep 16, 2017
Sean Good; C	Recruit ratings: Scout: Rivals: 247Sports: (NR)				
Michael Anekwe; PF	Lagos, Nigeria	Besant Hill High School	6 ft 8 in (2.03 m)	200 lb (91 kg)	Mar 30, 2018
Michael Anekwe; PF	Recruit ratings: Scout: Rivals: (NR)				
Overall recruit ranking:
Note: In many cases, Scout, Rivals, 247Sports, On3, and ESPN may conflict in their listings of height and weight.; In these cases, the average was taken. ESPN grades are on a 100-point scale.; Sources: "2018 Team Ranking". Rivals.

=== 2019 recruiting class ===
College recruiting information (2019)
Name	Hometown	School	Height	Weight	Commit date
Leo O'Boyle; SF	Scranton, PA	Scranton Preparatory School	6 ft 2 in (1.88 m)	162 lb (73 kg)	Aug 28, 2018
Leo O'Boyle; SF	Recruit ratings: Scout: Rivals: (NR)				
Neal Quinn; C	Allendale, NJ	Northern Highlands High School	6 ft 11 in (2.11 m)	245 lb (111 kg)	Jun 11, 2018
Neal Quinn; C	Recruit ratings: Scout: Rivals: (NR)				
Overall recruit ranking:
Note: In many cases, Scout, Rivals, 247Sports, On3, and ESPN may conflict in their listings of height and weight.; In these cases, the average was taken. ESPN grades are on a 100-point scale.; Sources: "2019 Team Ranking". Rivals.

== Roster ==
2018–19 Lafayette Leopards men's basketball team
Players
Coaches

Pos.	#	Name	Height	Weight	Year	Previous school	Hometown
G	3	Tyrone Perry	6 ft 1 in (1.85 m)	160 lb (73 kg)	Fr	Wekiva HS	Apopka, FL
G	4	Jay Vaughan (W)	6 ft 0 in (1.83 m)	166 lb (75 kg)	Fr	Allentown Central Catholic HS	Allentown, PA
G	5	Isaac Suffren	6 ft 4 in (1.93 m)	184 lb (83 kg)	Fr	Providence Day School	Charlotte, NC
G	11	Justin Jaworski	6 ft 1 in (1.85 m)	191 lb (87 kg)	So	Perkiomen Valley HS	Wchwenksville, PA
G	12	Auston Evans	6 ft 6 in (1.98 m)	190 lb (86 kg)	Sr	Greenhill HS	McKinney, TX
F	13	Sean Good	6 ft 10 in (2.08 m)	200 lb (91 kg)	Fr	Trinity HS	Camp Hill, PA
G	14	Cal Reichwein	6 ft 3 in (1.91 m)	208 lb (94 kg)	Jr	Central Bucks West HS	Doylestown, PA
G	20	E.J. Stephens	6 ft 3 in (1.91 m)	170 lb (77 kg)	So	St. Thomas Aquinas HS	Plantation, FL
G	21	Alex Petrie	6 ft 3 in (1.91 m)	194 lb (88 kg)	So	St. Christopher's School	Midlothian, VA
F	23	Lukas Jarrett	6 ft 7 in (2.01 m)	205 lb (93 kg)	Jr	Northport HS	Northport, NY
G	24	Kyle Stout	6 ft 6 in (1.98 m)	194 lb (88 kg)	Jr	Parkland HS	Schnecksville, PA
F	32	Michael Anekwe	6 ft 6 in (1.98 m)	209 lb (95 kg)	Fr	Besant Hill School (CA)	Lagos, Nigeria
F	33	Paulius Zalys	6 ft 7 in (2.01 m)	209 lb (95 kg)	Sr	Perkiomen School	Kaunas, Lithuania
F	44	Dylan Hastings	6 ft 8 in (2.03 m)	210 lb (95 kg)	So	Solanco HS	Quarryville, PA
F	54	Myles Cherry	6 ft 9 in (2.06 m)	234 lb (106 kg)	Jr	Choate Rosemary Hall	Newcastle, Australia

Head coach

- Fran O'Hanlon (Villanova)

Assistant coach(es)

- Jimmy Fenerty (Dickinson State)
- Jarren Dyson (Emory & Henry)
- Justin Purrell (Holy Cross)

Legend

- (C) Team captain
- (S) Suspended
- (I) Ineligible
- (W) Walk-on
- Injured
- Current redshirt

Roster
Last update: December 28, 2017

== Schedule and results ==
Date time, TV	Rank^{#}	Opponent^{#}	Result	Record	Site (attendance) city, state
Non-conference regular season
Nov 7, 2018*; 7:00 pm		at Saint Peter's	L 86–93	0–1	Yanitelli Center (1,210); Jersey City, NJ
Nov 10, 2018*; 3:00 pm, ESPN+		at La Salle	W 77–76	1–1	Tom Gola Arena (3,400); Philadelphia, PA
Nov 13, 2018*; 7:00 pm		at Penn	L 61–91	1–2	Palestra (2,061); Philadelphia, PA
Nov 18, 2018*; 2:00 pm, WBPH		St. Francis Brooklyn	L 72–84	1–3	Kirby Sports Center (1,146); Easton, PA
Nov 25, 2018*; 3:00 pm		at Fairleigh Dickinson	W 80–76	2–3	Rothman Center (242); Teaneck, NJ
Nov 28, 2018*; 7:00 pm, WPBH		Cornell	L 58–63	2–4	Kirby Sports Center (988); Easton, PA
Dec 2, 2018*; 2:00 pm, WPBH		Sacred Heart	L 62–64	2–5	Kirby Sports Center (1,322); Easton, PA
Dec 5, 2018*; 6:00 pm, ESPNU		at UConn	L 63–90	2-6	XL Center (6,928); Hartford, CT
Dec 8, 2018*; 2:00 pm		at Quinnipiac	L 77–88	2–7	People's United Center (2,008); Hamden, CT
Dec 19, 2018*; 7:00 pm, WPBH		Rosemont	W 95–54	3–7	Kirby Sports Center (886); Easton, PA
Dec 21, 2018*; 7:00 pm, WPBH		Princeton	L 79–81	3–8	Kirby Sports Center (1,134); Easton, PA
Patriot League regular season
Jan 2, 2019; 7:00 pm		at Lehigh	L 83–86	3–9 (0–1)	Stabler Arena (1,309); Bethlehem, PA
Jan 5, 2019; 1:00 pm		at Army	L 69–77	3–10 (0–2)	Christl Arena (471); West Point, NY
Jan 9, 2019; 7:00 pm, WPBH		Loyola (MD)	W 85–70	4–10 (1–2)	Kirby Sports Center (1,109); Easton, PA
Jan 12, 2019; 3:00 pm		at Holy Cross	L 70–77	4–11 (1–3)	Hart Center (1,182); Worcester, MA
Jan 16, 2019; 7:00 pm, WPBH		Navy	L 77–85	4–12 (1–4)	Kirby Sports Center (989); Easton, PA
Jan 19, 2019; 2:00 pm		at American	W 84–79	5–12 (2–4)	Bender Arena (694); Washington, D.C.
Jan 23, 2019; 7:00 pm		at Colgate	L 47–57	5–13 (2–5)	Cotterell Court (417); Hamilton, NY
Jan 26, 2019; 2:00 pm, WPBH		Army	L 63–69	5–14 (2–6)	Kirby Sports Center (1,189); Easton, PA
Jan 30, 2019; 8:30 pm, WPBH		Lehigh	L 86–93 ^{OT}	5–15 (2–7)	Kirby Sports Center (1,344); Easton, PA
Feb 2, 2019; 2:00 pm, WPBH		Bucknell	L 66–94	5–16 (2–8)	Kirby Sports Center (1,487); Easton, PA
Feb 6, 2019; 7:00 pm		at Boston University	W 79–72	6–16 (3–8)	Case Gym (459); Boston, MA
Feb 10, 2019; 12:00 pm, CBSSN		Holy Cross	W 69–67	7–16 (4–8)	Kirby Sports Center (1,342); Easton, PA
Feb 13, 2019; 7:00 pm		at Navy	W 80–74	8–16 (5–8)	Alumni Hall (468); Annapolis, MD
Feb 17, 2019; 2:00 pm		at Loyola (MD)	W 69–64	9–16 (6–8)	Reitz Arena (879); Baltimore, MD
Feb 20, 2019; 7:00 pm, WPBH		American	W 70–68	10–16 (7–8)	Kirby Sports Center (899); Easton, PA
Feb 24, 2019; 2:00 pm		at Bucknell	L 76–118	10–17 (7–9)	Sojka Pavilion (2,968); Lewisburg, PA
Feb 27, 2019; 7:00 pm, WPBH		Boston University	L 82–84	10–18 (7–10)	Kirby Sports Center (1,247); Easton, PA
Mar 2, 2019; 12:00 pm, WPBH		Colgate	L 70–76	10–19 (7–11)	Kirby Sports Center (1,447); Easton, PA
Patriot League tournament
Mar 5, 2019; 7:00 pm	(7)	(10) Holy Cross; First round	L 74–79	10–20	Kirby Sports Center (1,004); Easton, PA
*Non-conference game. ^{#}Rankings from AP Poll. (#) Tournament seedings in parentheses. All times are in Eastern Time.

== See also ==
2018–19 Lafayette Leopards women's basketball team
