= Will Rayman =

American-Israeli basketball player (born 1997)

Will Rayman ויל ריימן
- Rayman with Maccabi Tel Aviv in 2026

No. 11 – Maccabi Tel Aviv
- Position: Power forward / small forward
- League: Israeli Basketball Premier League; EuroLeague

Personal information
- Born: April 1, 1997 (age 29) New York City, New York, U.S.
- Listed height: 6 ft 8 in (2.03 m)
- Listed weight: 222 lb (101 kg)

Career information
- High school: Millbrook School (Millbrook, New York); New Hampton School (New Hampton, New Hampshire)
- College: Colgate (2016–2020)
- NBA draft: 2020: undrafted
- Playing career: 2020–present

Career history
- 2020: Tartu Ülikool
- 2020–2021: BG Göttingen
- 2021: BK Ventspils
- 2021–2023: Hapoel Haifa
- 2023–present: Maccabi Tel Aviv
- 2023–2024: →Saint-Quentin

Career highlights
- Patriot League Defensive Player of the Year (2020); 2× Patriot League All-Defensive Team (2019, 2020); First-team All-Patriot League (2020); 2× Second-team All-Patriot League (2018, 2019); Patriot League Rookie of the Year (2017); Patriot League All-Rookie Team (2017)

William Henry Rayman (Hebrew: ויל ריימן; born April 1, 1997) is an Israeli–American professional basketball player for Maccabi Tel Aviv of the Israeli Basketball Premier League and the EuroLeague. He played college basketball for Colgate, for whom in his senior year he was Patriot League Defensive Player of the Year and All-Patriot League First Team.

== Early life ==
Rayman was born in New York City to Graham Rayman (a journalist and author) and Bronwen Hruska (a novelist and head of Soho Press), and grew up on the Upper West Side of Manhattan. He has one brother. He is 6 ft 8 in (203 cm), and weighs 222 pounds (101 kg).

== High school ==
Rayman had a four-year career at the Millbrook School, in Millbrook, New York. He was named the New England Preparatory School Athletic Council Class B Player of the Year after averaging 22 points, nine rebounds, and three assists per game as a senior at the Millbrook School. He was named All-Conference both his junior and his senior seasons. He finished his career with averages of 15 points and six rebounds per game.

He then played a season at New Hampton School, in New Hampton, New Hampshire. Rayman earned Region All-Star and All-Conference honors following his post-graduate year at New Hampton.

== College ==
As a freshman at Colgate University in Hamilton, New York, in 2016-17, playing for the Colgate Raiders basketball team Rayman scored 14.6 points per game (9th in the Patriot League; while leading all Patriot League freshmen with 14.9 points per league game), set a Colgate first-year season record with 65 three-pointers, had a .691 free throw percentage (9th), and had 4.6 rebounds per game. He also set a Colgate first-year single-game scoring record that (breaking one previously held by Raider All-American and NBA player Adonal Foyle) with 34 points against Lafayette College. He was named Patriot League Rookie of the Year, to the Patriot League All-Rookie Team, and Colgate Athletics Male Rookie of the Year.

As a sophomore in 2017-18 Rayman scored 14.6 points per game (10th in the league), pulled down 6.7 rebounds per game (4th), with 0.8 blocks per game (9th), and had a 41.8% three-point shooting percentage, a 44.7% field goal percentage, and an 80.7% free throw percentage (4th in the league). He was named to the All-Patriot League men's basketball tournament team, Second Team All-Patriot-League, and National Association of Basketball Coaches (NABC) All-District Second Team.

As a junior in 2018-19, he scored 13.1 points per game, and had 6.5 rebounds (6th in the league), 0.8 blocks (10th), and 1.5 assists per game. Rayman had a 42.9% three-point percentage, a 42.5% field goal percentage, and a 68.1% free throw percentage. He was named Second Team All-Patriot-League, and was named to the Patriot League All-Defensive Team, and to the Patriot League All-Tournament First Team.

As a senior in 2019-20, Rayman had 12.6 points, 9.0 rebounds (leading the league), 1.0 blocks (4th), and 1.7 assists per game, with a 44.4% field goal percentage, a 35.9% three-point percentage, and an 80.0% free throw percentage. He was named Patriot League Defensive Player of the Year, to the Patriot League All-Defensive Team and All-Patriot League First Team, and 2020 NABC District 13 second team.

His college major was education sciences.

== Professional career ==
In 2020, Rayman played for Estonian team Tartu Ülikool in the Latvian-Estonian Basketball League. In the 2020–21 season, he played for BG Göttingen in the German Basketball Bundesliga.

Rayman has played for Hapoel Haifa in the Israeli Basketball Premier League since 2021.

On August 6, 2023, he signed a 3-year deal with Maccabi Tel Aviv and loaned to Saint-Quentin of the LNB Pro A for 2023–24 season.

On January 27, 2026, Rayman signed a new, 3-year deal with Maccabi
