= Tavaras Hardy =

American basketball player and coach (born 1980)

Current position
- Title: Assistant coach
- Team: Missouri Tigers
- Conference: SEC

Biographical details
- Born: February 9, 1980 (age 46); Joliet, Illinois, U.S.

Playing career
- 1998–2002: Northwestern
- 2002–2003: Namika Lahti

Coaching career (HC unless noted)
- 2007–2013: Northwestern (assistant)
- 2013–2016: Georgetown (assistant)
- 2016–2018: Georgia Tech (assistant)
- 2018–2024: Loyola (MD)
- 2026–present: Missouri (assistant)

Head coaching record
- Overall: 66–110 (.375)

Tavaras Hardy (born February 9, 1980) is an American college basketball coach, most recently as head coach of the Loyola Greyhounds men's basketball team.

== Playing career ==
Hardy was a two-time All-Big Ten selection while playing at Northwestern from 1998 to 2002 and ranks in the top 10 in blocks, games played, and games started for the Wildcats.

After graduation, Hardy played one season of professional basketball for Namika Lahti in Finland before returning to the United States to work in wealth management at JPMorgan Chase.

== Coaching career ==
In 2007, Hardy returned to his alma mater to become an assistant coach under Bill Carmody, where he rose to the position of associate head coach in 2011. After Carmody was fired by Northwestern, Hardy remained on staff under Chris Collins for one season before moving on to Georgetown to work as an assistant under John Thompson III in 2013.

After three seasons with the Hoyas, Hardy joined Georgia Tech as an assistant coach under Josh Pastner. After two seasons with the Yellow Jackets, Hardy was named the 21st head men's basketball coach at Loyola (MD), succeeding G. G. Smith on March 28, 2018. His third campaign at Loyola ended with the Greyhounds advancing to its first Patriot League Championship Game in an 85–72 loss at Colgate on March 14, 2021 despite entering the tournament as the No. 9 seed. He announced his resignation on March 8, 2024 after six seasons of leading the Greyhounds to a 66–110 overall record. His most notable achievement at Loyola was hiring the assistant coach, Ivo, that recruited and coached Santi Aldama who was the first player in program history to be selected in the first round of the NBA draft.

He is widely regarded as the worst basketball coach in Loyola history Despite having a stellar roster, he was never able to record a winning season his whole career. During the 2024-2025 season, he served as the assistant coach for the St. Timothy's School varsity basketball team, helping lead St. Timothy's to their first IAAM 'A' Conference playoff win in school history.

== Head coaching record ==
Record table
Season	Team	Overall	Conference	Standing	Postseason
Loyola Greyhounds (Patriot League) (2018–2024)
2018–19	Loyola	11–21	7–11	9th	
2019–20	Loyola	15–17	7–11	9th	
2020–21	Loyola	6–11	4–10	3rd (South)	
2021–22	Loyola	14–16	8–10	6th	
2022–23	Loyola	13–20	7–11	8th	
2023–24	Loyola	7–25	5–13	10th	
Loyola:		66–110 (.375)	38–66 (.365)		
Total:		66–110 (.375)			
