= 2018–19 Metro Atlantic Athletic Conference men's basketball season =

- League: NCAA Division I
- Sport: Basketball
- Duration: November 6, 2018-March 22, 2019
- Teams: 11

2018–19 NCAA Division I men's basketball season
- Season champions: Iona Gaels
- Runners-up: Canisius Golden Griffins
- Season MVP: Cameron Young (Quinnipiac)
- Top scorer: Cameron Young (Quinnipiac) 23.5

Tournament
- Champions: Iona Gaels
- Runners-up: Monmouth Hawks
- Finals MVP: Rickey McGill (Iona)

Metro Atlantic Athletic Conference men's basketball seasons
- ← 2017–18 2019–20 →

2018–19 MAAC men's basketball standings
	Conf.				Overall
Team	W		L	PCT	W		L	PCT
Iona †	12	–	6	.667	17	–	16	.515
Canisius	11	–	7	.611	15	–	17	.469
Quinnipiac	11	–	7	.611	16	–	15	.516
Rider	11	–	7	.611	16	–	15	.516
Siena	11	–	7	.611	17	–	16	.515
Monmouth	10	–	8	.556	14	–	21	.400
Manhattan	8	–	10	.444	11	–	21	.344
Marist	7	–	11	.389	12	–	19	.387
Saint Peter's	6	–	12	.333	10	–	22	.313
Fairfield	6	–	12	.333	9	–	22	.290
Niagara	6	–	12	.333	13	–	19	.406
† 2019 MAAC tournament winner

The 2018–19 Metro Atlantic Athletic Conference (MAAC) men's basketball season began with practices in October 2018, followed by the start of the 2018–19 NCAA Division I men's basketball season on November 6. Conference play started in January and concluded March 22, 2019. This season was the 38th season of MAAC basketball.

The MAAC season saw four teams spend considerable time being in first place; Rider, Monmouth, Canisius and Iona. Rider started MAAC play off strong, winning seven of their first eight MAAC games, and looking like they would prove the preseason #1 pick correct. But then a five-game losing streak left them at 7–6, and two games out of first place. Monmouth started the regular season 0–12 at one point, but rebounded when MAAC play started, posting a 9–4 conference mark by February 9. Then a four-game losing streak struck down the Hawks, knocking them out of first place. Canisius had a solid season, keeping up with Monmouth the whole way. Consecutive losses to Iona and Niagara late in the season struck down their first place hopes. Iona, which had won the MAAC Tournament three consecutive times coming into the season, started off 5–2, but like the others, a four-game losing streak left them at 5–6 in MAAC play. Sitting in sixth place, Iona found their new starting five combination, and reeled off seven straight wins to end the MAAC season, and take the regular season crown in 2019. It was the 11th MAAC regular season championship for the Gaels.

The 2019 MAAC tournament was held from March 7 through March 11 at the Times Union Center in Albany, New York. This marked the 20th time Albany has hosted the event. No. 1 seed Iona defeated No. 6 seed Monmouth in the championship game 81–60 to win the conference's automatic bid to the 2019 NCAA tournament. With the win, Iona became the first MAAC team to win four consecutive MAAC Tournament championships.

Quinnipiac was the first MAAC team of the season to see postseason action, as they accepted an invitation to participate in the 2019 CollegeInsider.com Postseason Tournament, losing to NJIT 81–92 in the first round. Iona received a No. 16 seed in the NCAA Tournament Midwest Region, and faced No. 1 seed North Carolina in the first round on March 22, 2019. Iona led 38–33 at halftime, but despite Iona making 10 of 21 3-point tries in the first half, North Carolina started the second half on a 32–11 run to take control of the game, winning 88–73.

== Head coaches ==
=== Coaching changes ===
On March 5, 2018, Marist head coach Mike Maker was fired. He finished at Marist with a four-year record of 28–97. Marist hired Saint Peter's coach John Dunne as Maker's successor on April 3.

On April 10, 2018, Seton Hall assistant coach Shaheen Holloway was hired as the new head coach at Saint Peter's.

On April 13, 2018, Siena head coach Jimmy Patsos resigned amid an investigation regarding abusive conduct and financial improprieties within the program. On May 2, the Saints hired Mount St. Mary's head coach Jamion Christian for the job.

=== Coaches ===
Team	Head coach	Previous job	Year at school	Overall record	MAAC record	MAAC Tournament championships
Canisius	Reggie Witherspoon	Chattanooga (asst.)	3	39–28	25–13	0
Fairfield	Sydney Johnson	Princeton	8	107–125	62–72	0
Iona	Tim Cluess	LIU Post	9	182–92	112–40	4
Manhattan	Steve Masiello	Louisville (asst.)	8	116–110	72–62	2
Marist	John Dunne	Saint Peter's	1	0–0	0–0	1
Monmouth	King Rice	Vanderbilt (asst.)	8	117–112	60–38	0
Niagara	Chris Casey	LIU Post	6	51–110	33–65	0
Quinnipiac	Baker Dunleavy	Villanova (asst.)	2	12–21	7–11	0
Rider	Kevin Baggett	Rider (assoc. HC)	7	107–89	69–47	0
Saint Peter's	Shaheen Holloway	Seton Hall (asst.)	1	0–0	0–0	0
Siena	Jamion Christian	Mount St. Mary's	1	0–0	0–0	0

Notes:

- All records, appearances, titles, etc. are from time with current school only.
- Year at school includes 2018–19 season.
- Overall and MAAC records are from time at current school and are before the beginning of the season.
- Previous jobs are head coaching jobs unless otherwise noted.

== Preseason ==
=== Preseason Coaches Poll ===
Rank	Team
1.	Rider (11)
2.	Canisius
T3.	Iona
T3.	Quinnipiac
5.	Monmouth
6.	Marist
7.	Fairfield
8.	Manhattan
9.	Niagara
10.	Saint Peter's
11.	Siena

() first place votes

=== Preseason All-MAAC teams ===
2018-19 MAAC Men's Basketball Preseason All-MAAC Teams
First Team	Second Team	Third Team
†Isaiah Reese – Canisius; Rickey McGill – Iona; Cameron Young – Quinnipiac; Stevie Jordan – Rider; †Dimencio Vaughn – Rider	Takal Molson – Canisius; Roland Griffin – Iona; Pauly Paulicap – Manhattan; Brian Parker – Marist; Frederick Scott – Rider	E.J. Crawford – Iona; Deion Hammond – Monmouth; Marvin Prochet – Niagara; Rich Kelly – Quinnipiac; Jordan Allen – Rider

† denotes unanimous selection

=== Preseason Player of the Year ===
Recipient	School
Isaiah Reese	Canisius

== MAAC regular season ==
=== Conference matrix ===
This table summarizes the final head-to-head results between teams in conference play.

	Canisius	Fairfield	Iona	Manhattan	Marist	Monmouth	Niagara	Quinnipiac	Rider	Saint Peter's	Siena
vs. Canisius	–	0–2	2–0	1–0	1–1	0–2	2–0	0–2	1–1	0–1	0–2
vs. Fairfield	2–0	–	1–1	1–1	0–2	2–0	1–1	1–0	1–0	1–1	2–0
vs. Iona	0–2	1–1	–	0–1	1–1	1–1	1–1	1–1	0–2	0–1	1–1
vs. Manhattan	0–1	1–1	1–0	–	2–0	2–0	0–2	1–1	1–1	0–2	2–0
vs. Marist	1–1	2–0	1–1	0–2	–	0–1	0–1	1–1	2–0	2–0	2–0
vs. Monmouth	2–0	0–2	1–1	0–2	1–0	–	1–0	2–0	1–1	0–2	0–2
vs. Niagara	0–2	1–1	1–1	2–0	1–0	0–1	–	1–1	2–0	2–0	2–0
vs. Quinnipiac	2–0	0–1	1–1	1–1	1–1	0–2	1–1	–	1–1	0–2	0–1
vs. Rider	1–1	0–1	2–0	1–1	0–2	1–1	0–2	1–1	–	0–2	1–0
vs. Saint Peter's	1–0	1–1	1–0	2–0	0–2	2–0	0–2	2–0	2–0	–	1–1
vs. Siena	2–0	0–2	1–1	0–2	0–2	2–0	0–2	1–0	0–1	1–1	–
Total	11–7	6–12	12–6	8–10	7–11	10–8	6–12	11–7	15–3	6–12	11–7

=== Player of the week ===
Throughout the regular season, the Metro Atlantic Athletic Conference offices named player(s) of the week and rookie(s) of the week.

Week	Player of the week	Rookie of the week
November 12, 2018	Brian Parker, Marist	Neftali Alvarez, Fairfield
November 19, 2018	Marvin Prochet, Niagara	Neftali Alvarez (2), Fairfield
November 26, 2018	Dimencio Vaughn, Rider	Jalen Pickett, Siena
December 3, 2018	Jalen Pickett, Siena	Jalen Pickett (2), Siena
December 10, 2018	James Towns, Niagara	Tyrese Williams, Quinnipiac
December 17, 2018	Marvin Prochet (2), Niagara	Calvin Whipple, Fairfield
December 24, 2018	James Towns (2), Niagara	Neftali Alvarez (3), Fairfield
December 31, 2018	Evan Fisher, Siena	Jalen Pickett (3), Siena
January 7, 2019	Rickey McGill, Iona	Jalen Pickett (4), Siena
January 14, 2019	Cameron Young, Quinnipiac	Jalen Pickett (5), Siena
January 21, 2019	Isaiah Reese, Canisius	Jalen Pickett (6), Siena
January 28, 2019	Cameron Young (2), Quinnipiac	Jalen Pickett (7), Siena
February 4, 2019	Cameron Young (3), Quinnipiac	Samir Stewart, Manhattan
February 11, 2019	Evan Fisher (2), Siena	Jalen Pickett (8), Siena
February 18, 2019	Cameron Young (4), Quinnipiac	Jalen Pickett (9), Siena
February 25, 2019	Rickey McGill (2), Iona	Jalen Pickett (10), Siena
March 4, 2019	E.J. Crawford, Iona	Jalen Pickett (11), Siena

=== Records against other conferences ===
2018–19 records against non-conference foes. Records shown for regular season only.

Power 7 Conferences	Record
American	0–3
ACC	1–4
Big East	0–4
Big Ten	0–1
Big 12	0–2
Pac-12	0–1
SEC	0–2
Power 7 Total	1–17
Other NCAA Division I Conferences	Record
America East	8–10
A-10	2–8
ASUN	1–0
Big Sky	1–0
Big South	2–1
Big West	1–3
CAA	1–8
C-USA	0–3
Horizon League	0–3
Ivy League	6–7
MAC	0–3
MEAC	5–0
MVC	0–3
Mountain West	1–1
NEC	5–9
OVC	0–0
Patriot League	5–13
Pacific West	0–0
SoCon	0–0
Southland	0–1
SWAC	0–1
The Summit	1–0
Sun Belt	1–0
WAC	0–1
WCC	0–0
Other Division I Total	40–75
NCAA Division I Total	41–92

== Postseason ==
=== MAAC Tournament ===
- 2019 Metro Atlantic Athletic Conference Basketball Tournament, Times Union Center, Albany, New York

First round Thursday, March 7 ESPN3
8	Marist	68
9	Saint Peter's	71*
7	Manhattan	57
10	Fairfield	53
6	Monmouth	76
11	Niagara	72

Quarterfinals; Friday/Saturday, March 8/9; ESPN3
1	Iona	73
9	Saint Peter's	71
4	Rider	81
5	Siena	87
2	Canisius	69*
7	Manhattan	65
3	Quinnipiac	92
6	Monmouth	98

Semifinals; Sunday, March 10; ESPN3/ESPNU
1	Iona	73
5	Siena	57
2	Canisius	59
6	Monmouth	73

Championship; Monday, March 11; ESPN2
1	Iona	81
6	Monmouth	60

* denotes number of overtimes

=== NCAA Tournament ===
Seed	Region	School	1st Round
16	Midwest	Iona	L 73–88 vs. (1) North Carolina – (Columbus)

Game summary

TBS

March 22, 2019
9:30 pm

Recap

No. 16 Iona 73, No. 1 North Carolina 88
Scoring by half: 38–33, 35–55
Pts: McGill – 26; Rebs: Ristanovic – 6 Asts: Gist – 5 Gist – 17 pts	Pts: Johnson – 21; Rebs: Maye – 9 Asts: Johnson & White – 4 Little– 19 pts
NCAA Tournament first round

Nationwide Arena
Columbus, OH
Attendance: 19,426
Referees: Don Daily, Jose Carrion, Todd Austin

=== CollegeInsider.com Tournament ===
School	1st Round
Quinnipiac	L 81–92 at NJIT – (Newark, NJ)

Game summary

n/a

March 18, 2019
7:00 pm

Recap

Quinnipiac 81, NJIT 92
Scoring by half: 33–37, 48–55
Pts: Young – 29; Rebs: Marfo – 11; Asts: Kelly – 6 Young – 8 reb, 2 stl	Pts: Cooks – 34; Rebs: Diakite – 9 Asts: Gibbs – 7 Gibbs – 15 pts
CIT First Round

Wellness and Events Center
Newark, NJ
Attendance: 777
Referees: Mike Kitts, Donnie Eppley, Rob Rorke

== Honors and awards ==
=== MAAC Awards ===
2018-19 MAAC Men's Basketball Major Individual Awards
Award	Recipient(s)
Player of the Year	†Cameron Young, Sr, G, Quinnipiac
Coach of the Year	Tim Cluess, Iona
Rookie of the Year	†Jalen Pickett, Fr, G, Siena
Defensive Player of the Year	Jonathan Kasibabu, Sr, F, Fairfield
Sixth Player of the Year	Ryan Funk, Sr, G/F, Marist

2018-19 MAAC Men's Basketball All-Conference Teams
First Team	Second Team	Third Team	Rookie Team
†Cameron Young, Sr, G, Quinnipiac; Rickey McGill, Sr, G, Iona; Jalen Pickett, Fr, G, Siena; E.J. Crawford, Jr, G/F, Iona; Takal Molson, So, F, Canisius	Rich Kelly, So, G, Quinnipiac; Stevie Jordan, Jr, G, Rider; Tajuan Agee, Jr, F, Iona; Marvin Prochet, Sr, F, Niagara; Evan Fisher, Sr, F, Siena	Brian Parker, Sr, G, Marist; Davauhnte Turner, Sr, G, Saint Peter's; Malik Johnson, Jr, G, Canisius; Frederick Scott, So, F, Rider; Diago Quinn, Sr, C, Monmouth	†Jalen Pickett, Fr, G, Siena; Neftali Alvarez, Fr, G, Fairfield; Tyrese Williams, Fr, G, Quinnipiac; Warren Williams, Fr, F, Manhattan; Sloan Seymour, Fr, F, Siena

† denotes unanimous selection

== 2018–19 Season final statistic leaders ==
=== Scoring leaders ===
Name	Points per game
Cameron Young (Quinnipiac)	23.5
E.J. Crawford (Iona)	17.7
Takal Molson (Canisius)	16.9
Davauhnte Turner (Saint Peter's)	16.8
Evan Fisher (Siena)	15.9

=== Rebound leaders ===
Name	Rebounds per game
Tajuan Agee (Iona)	8.0
Kevin Marfo (Quinnipiac)	7.5
Jonathan Kasibabu (Fairfield)	7.4
Marvin Prochet (Niagara)	7.3
Tyere Marshall (Rider)	6.6

=== Assist leaders ===
Name	Assists per game
Jalen Pickett (Siena)	6.7
Rickey McGill (Iona)	4.8
Malik Johnson (Canisius)	4.8
Rich Kelly (Quinnipiac)	4.5
Stevie Jordan (Rider)	4.4

=== Block leaders ===
Name	Blocked shots
Dominic Robb (Niagara)	69
Samuel Idowu (Saint Peter's)	59
KC Ndefo (Saint Peter's)	56
Diago Quinn (Monmouth)	30
Jalen Pickett (Siena)	29

=== Steal leaders ===
Name	Steals
Rickey McGill (Iona)	78
Jalen Pickett (Siena)	66
Nick Rutherford (Monmouth)	61
Stevie Jordan (Rider)	56
Malik Johnson (Canisius)	55

=== 3PT % leaders ===
Name	3FG	3FGA	3FG%
Cameron Young (Quinnipiac)	104	238	43.7
Landon Taliaferro (Fairfield)	90	213	42.3
Marvin Prochet (Niagara)	75	178	42.1
Ryan Funk (Marist)	79	200	39.5
Sloan Seymour (Siena)	94	252	37.3
