= 2018–19 Iona Gaels men's basketball team =

American college basketball season

2018–19 Iona Gaels men's basketball
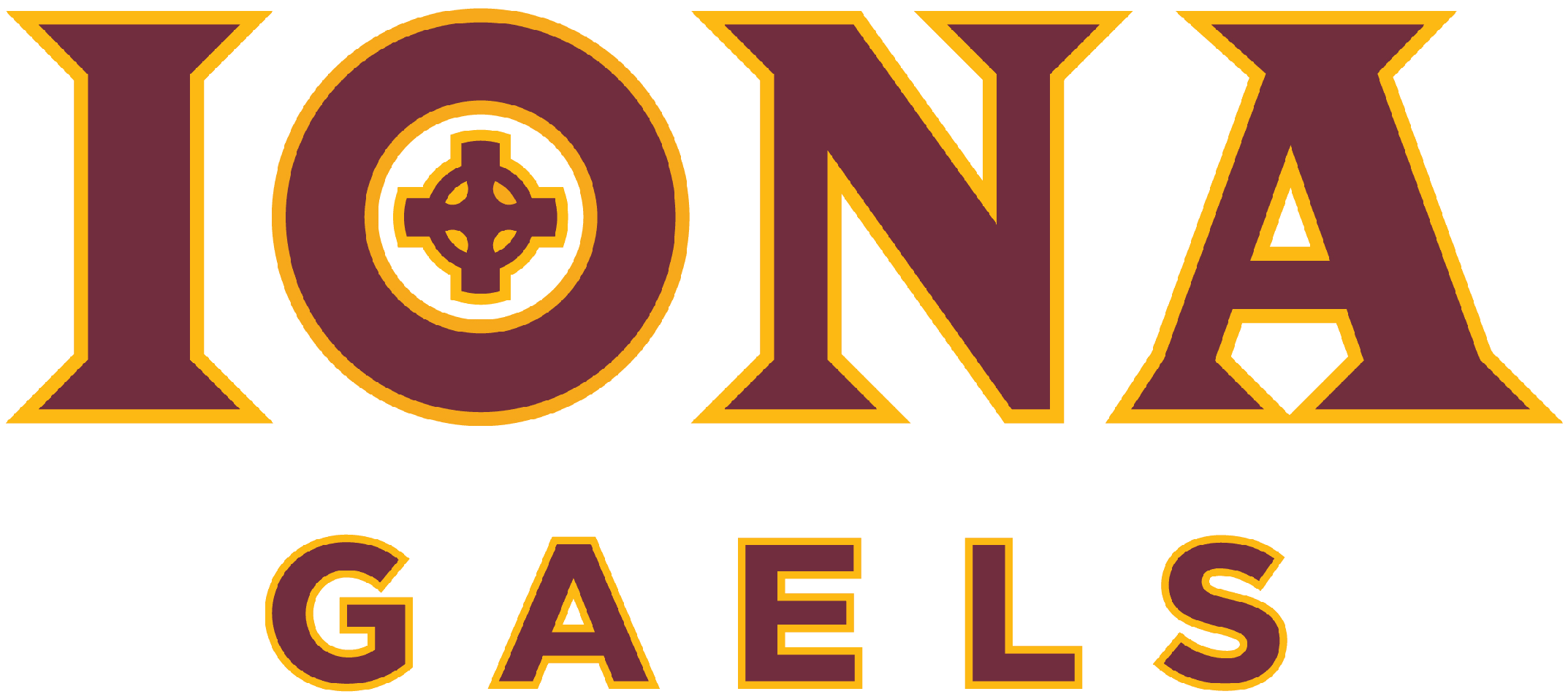

MAAC regular-season and tournament champions

NCAA tournament, First Round
- Conference: Metro Atlantic Athletic Conference
- Record: 17–16 (12–6 MAAC)
- Head coach: Tim Cluess (9th season)
- Assistant coaches: Eric Eaton; Tra Arnold; Ricky Johns
- Home arena: Hynes Athletic Center

2018–19 MAAC men's basketball standings
	Conf.				Overall
Team	W		L	PCT	W		L	PCT
Iona †	12	–	6	.667	17	–	16	.515
Canisius	11	–	7	.611	15	–	17	.469
Quinnipiac	11	–	7	.611	16	–	15	.516
Rider	11	–	7	.611	16	–	15	.516
Siena	11	–	7	.611	17	–	16	.515
Monmouth	10	–	8	.556	14	–	21	.400
Manhattan	8	–	10	.444	11	–	21	.344
Marist	7	–	11	.389	12	–	19	.387
Saint Peter's	6	–	12	.333	10	–	22	.313
Fairfield	6	–	12	.333	9	–	22	.290
Niagara	6	–	12	.333	13	–	19	.406
† 2019 MAAC tournament winner

The 2018–19 Iona Gaels men's basketball team represented Iona College during the 2018–19 NCAA Division I men's basketball season. The Gaels were led by ninth-year head coach Tim Cluess, and played their home games at the Hynes Athletic Center in New Rochelle, New York as members of the Metro Atlantic Athletic Conference (MAAC). They finished the regular season 17–16 overall, 12–6 in MAAC play, to win the regular season championship. As the No. 1 seed in the 2019 MAAC tournament, they defeated No. 9 seed Saint Peter's, No. 5 seed Siena and No. 6 seed Monmouth 81–60, to become champions of the MAAC tournament for a record fourth consecutive time. They earned the MAAC's automatic bid to the 2019 NCAA tournament, receiving a 16 seed in the Midwest region, and facing No. 1 seed North Carolina in the first round. Iona led 38–33 at the half, while making 10-of-21 three-pointers. But North Carolina opened the second half on a 25–7 run, leading by as many as 20, en route to an 88–73 victory. Iona's 15 made three-point field goals are the most ever by a North Carolina opponent in its NCAA tournament history of 171 games.

== Previous season ==
The Gaels finished the 2017–18 season 20–14, 11–7 in MAAC play, to finish in fourth place. They defeated Manhattan, Saint Peter's and Fairfield to become champions of the MAAC tournament for the third consecutive time. They earned the MAAC's automatic bid to the NCAA tournament where they lost in the first round to Duke.

== Roster ==
2018–19 Iona Gaels men's basketball team
Players
Coaches

Pos.	#	Name	Height	Weight	Year	Hometown
G	0	Rickey McGill	6 ft 2 in (1.88 m)	185 lb (84 kg)	Sr	Spring Valley, NY
G/F	1	Isaiah Still	6 ft 7 in (2.01 m)	195 lb (88 kg)	Jr	Rahway, NJ
G/F	2	E.J. Crawford	6 ft 6 in (1.98 m)	210 lb (95 kg)	Jr	Hartford, CT
G	3	Asante Gist	5 ft 11 in (1.8 m)	185 lb (84 kg)	Jr	East Orange, NJ
G	5	Ben Perez	6 ft 4 in (1.93 m)	180 lb (82 kg)	Jr	San Marcos, CA
F	10	Andrija Ristanovic	6 ft 11 in (2.11 m)	215 lb (98 kg)	RS Fr	Belgrade, Serbia
F	12	Tajuan Agee	6 ft 9 in (2.06 m)	215 lb (98 kg)	Jr	Chicago, IL
F	13	Jahnathan Maxwell	6 ft 8 in (2.03 m)	230 lb (104 kg)	Jr	Virginia Beach, VA
G	20	Isaiah Ross	6 ft 4 in (1.93 m)	200 lb (91 kg)	Jr	Davenport, IA
G	24	Malik Rhem	6 ft 3 in (1.91 m)	175 lb (79 kg)	Jr	The Bronx, NY
G	32	Payton Hudson	6 ft 0 in (1.83 m)	185 lb (84 kg)	Fr	Yonkers, NY
F	44	Niksa Nikolic	6 ft 8 in (2.03 m)	235 lb (107 kg)	Jr	Belgrade, Serbia

Head coach

- Tim Cluess (Hofstra)

Assistant coach(es)

- Eric Eaton (UMass–Dartmouth)
- Tra Arnold (Biola)
- Ricky Johns (Monroe)

Legend

- (C) Team captain
- (S) Suspended
- (I) Ineligible
- (W) Walk-on
- Injured
- Current redshirt

Roster
Last update: April 5, 2024

== Schedule and results ==
Date time, TV	Rank^{#}	Opponent^{#}	Result	Record	Site (attendance) city, state
Non-conference regular season
Nov 9, 2018*; 8:00 pm, ESPN3		Albany	W 72–68	1–0	Hynes Athletic Center (2,012); New Rochelle, NY
Nov 13, 2018*; 9:00 pm		at New Mexico	L 83–90	1–1	Dreamstyle Arena (10,188); Albuquerque, NM
Nov 19, 2018*; 5:00 pm		vs. Long Beach State; MGM Resorts Main Event Middleweight semifinals	L 85–86	1–2	Cox Pavilion; Paradise, NV
Nov 21, 2018*; 2:00pm		vs. Hartford; MGM Resorts Main Event Middleweight consolation	W 80–75	2–2	Cox Pavilion; Paradise, NV
Nov 24, 2018*; 4:00 pm, FSN		at Providence	L 79–91	2–3	Dunkin' Donuts Center (8,187); Providence, RI
Nov 27, 2018*; 7:00 pm, ESPN+		at Ohio	L 65–89	2–4	Convocation Center (5,227); Athens, OH
Dec 1, 2018*; 7:00 pm, MASN		at VCU	L 59–88	2–5	Siegel Center (7,637); Richmond, VA
Dec 9, 2018*; 11:00 am, FS1		vs. Columbia; MSG Holiday Festival	L 71–74	2–6	Madison Square Garden; New York City, NY
Dec 15, 2018*; 11:30 am		vs. Princeton; Boardwalk Classic	L 81–85	2–7	Boardwalk Hall; Atlantic City, NJ
Dec 22, 2018*; 2:00 pm, ESPN+		at Yale	L 84–99	2–8	Payne Whitney Gymnasium (1,136); New Haven, CT
Dec 30, 2018*; 1:00 pm, ESPN+		Holy Cross	L 71–78	2–9	Hynes Athletic Center (1,896); New Rochelle, NY
MAAC regular season
Jan 3, 2019; 7:00 pm, ESPN3		Monmouth	W 103–84	3–9 (1–0)	Hynes Athletic Center (1,057); New Rochelle, NY
Jan 5, 2019; 1:00 pm, ESPN3		Fairfield	W 94–87	4–9 (2–0)	Hynes Athletic Center (1,168); New Rochelle, NY
Jan 11, 2019; 7:00 pm		at Niagara	L 90–95	4–10 (2–1)	Gallagher Center (896); Lewiston, NY
Jan 13, 2019; 2:00 pm, ESPN3		at Canisius	W 88–70	5–10 (3–1)	Koessler Athletic Center (1,086); Buffalo, NY
Jan 18, 2019; 7:00 pm, ESPN+		Marist	W 90–77	6–10 (4–1)	Hynes Athletic Center (1,372); New Rochelle, NY
Jan 20, 2019; 1:00 pm, ESPN3		at Monmouth	L 81–83	6–11 (4–2)	OceanFirst Bank Center (1,739); West Long Branch, NJ
Jan 25, 2019; 7:00 pm, ESPNU		Rider	W 77–71	7–11 (5–2)	Hynes Athletic Center (1,652); New Rochelle, NY
Jan 27, 2019; 7:00 pm, ESPN3		at Fairfield	L 68–80	7–12 (5–3)	Webster Bank Arena (2,479); Bridgeport, CT
Jan 31, 2019; 7:00 pm, ESPN3		at Marist	L 74–78	7–13 (5–4)	McCann Field House (1,093); Poughkeepsie, NY
Feb 2, 2019; 1:00 pm, ESPN3		Siena	L 54–56	7–14 (5–5)	Hynes Athletic Center (1,537); New Rochelle, NY
Feb 8, 2019; 7:00 pm, ESPN+		Quinnipiac	L 65–66	7–15 (5–6)	Hynes Athletic Center (1,532); New Rochelle, NY
Feb 10, 2019; 1:00 pm, ESPN+		Niagara	W 79–76	8–15 (6–6)	Hynes Athletic Center (1,807); New Rochelle, NY
Feb 13, 2019; 7:00 pm, ESPN+		at Siena	W 57–52	9–15 (7–6)	Times Union Center (5,560); Albany, NY
Feb 15, 2019; 7:00 pm, ESPN+		Saint Peter's	W 62–46	10–15 (8–6)	Hynes Athletic Center (1,429); New Rochelle, NY
Feb 19, 2019; 7:00 pm, ESPN3		at Quinnipiac	W 81–77	11–15 (9–6)	People's United Center (1,585); Hamden, CT
Feb 22, 2019; 7:00 pm, Jaspervision		at Manhattan	W 66–52	12–15 (10–6)	Draddy Gymnasium (1,879); Riverdale, NY
Feb 24, 2019; 1:00 pm, ESPN+		Canisius	W 87–80	13–15 (11–6)	Hynes Athletic Center (2,288); New Rochelle, NY
Mar 1, 2019; 7:00 pm, ESPN+		at Rider	W 86–79	14–15 (12–6)	Alumni Gymnasium (1,650); Lawrenceville, NJ
MAAC tournament
Mar 8, 2019; 7:00 pm, ESPN3	(1)	vs. (9) Saint Peter's; Quarterfinals	W 73–71	15–15	Times Union Center (2,111); Albany, NY
Mar 10, 2019; 6:00 pm, ESPN3	(1)	at (5) Siena; Semifinals	W 73–57	16–15	Times Union Center (4,918); Albany, NY
Mar 11, 2019; 9:00 pm, ESPN2	(1)	vs. (6) Monmouth; Championship	W 81–60	17–15	Times Union Center (2,123); Albany, NY
NCAA tournament
Mar 22, 2019*; 9:20 pm, TNT	(16 MW)	vs. (1 MW) No. 3 North Carolina; First round	L 73–88	17–16	Nationwide Arena (19,426); Columbus, OH
*Non-conference game. ^{#}Rankings from AP poll. (#) Tournament seedings in parentheses. All times are in Eastern Time.
