= 2018–19 Saint Peter's Peacocks men's basketball team =

American college basketball season

2018–19 Saint Peter's Peacocks men's basketball
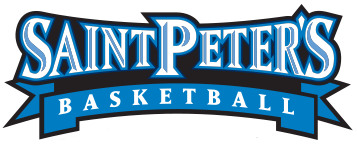
- Conference: Metro Atlantic Athletic Conference
- Record: 10–22 (6–12 MAAC)
- Head coach: Shaheen Holloway (1st season)
- Assistant coaches: Ryan Whalen; Matt Eisele; John Morton
- Home arena: Yanitelli Center

2018–19 MAAC men's basketball standings
	Conf.				Overall
Team	W		L	PCT	W		L	PCT
Iona †	12	–	6	.667	17	–	16	.515
Canisius	11	–	7	.611	15	–	17	.469
Quinnipiac	11	–	7	.611	16	–	15	.516
Rider	11	–	7	.611	16	–	15	.516
Siena	11	–	7	.611	17	–	16	.515
Monmouth	10	–	8	.556	14	–	21	.400
Manhattan	8	–	10	.444	11	–	21	.344
Marist	7	–	11	.389	12	–	19	.387
Saint Peter's	6	–	12	.333	10	–	22	.313
Fairfield	6	–	12	.333	9	–	22	.290
Niagara	6	–	12	.333	13	–	19	.406
† 2019 MAAC tournament winner

The 2018–19 Saint Peter's Peacocks men's basketball team represented Saint Peter's University in the 2018–19 NCAA Division I men's basketball season. They played their home games at Yanitelli Center in Jersey City, New Jersey as members of the Metro Atlantic Athletic Conference (MAAC), and were led by first-year head coach Shaheen Holloway. They finished the season 10–22 overall, 6–12 in MAAC play, to finish in a three-way tie for ninth place. As the ninth seed in the 2019 MAAC tournament, they upset No. 8 seed Marist in the first round before falling to No. 1 seed Iona in the quarterfinals.

== Previous season ==
The Peacocks finished the 2017–18 season 14–18, 6–12 in MAAC play, to finish in ninth place. As the No. 9 seed in the MAAC tournament, they defeated No. 8 seed Monmouth and upset No. 1 seed Rider to advance to the semifinals, where they lost to No. 4 seed Iona.

After the end of the season, head coach John Dunne left Saint Peter's to become the head coach at Marist. On April 10, 2018, Seton Hall assistant coach Shaheen Holloway was hired as his replacement.

== Roster ==
2018–19 Saint Peter's Peacocks men's basketball team
Players
Coaches

Pos.	#	Name	Height	Weight	Year	Previous school	Hometown
G	0	Dallas Watson	6 ft 4 in (1.93 m)	175 lb (79 kg)	Fr	St. Raymond	Brooklyn, NY
G	1	Davauhnte Turner	6 ft 0 in (1.83 m)	185 lb (84 kg)	RS Sr	Independence CC	Grambling, LA
G	2	Klay Brown	6 ft 4 in (1.93 m)	185 lb (84 kg)	Fr	Abraham Lincoln	Queens, NY
G	4	Nazeer Bostick (redshirt)	6 ft 4 in (1.93 m)	203 lb (92 kg)	RS Jr	Penn State	Philadelphia, PA
G/F	5	Manny Dixon	6 ft 5 in (1.96 m)	180 lb (82 kg)	RS Fr	Notre Dame HS	Trenton, NJ
G	10	Mikko Johnson	6 ft 2 in (1.88 m)	165 lb (75 kg)	RS Fr	Brooklyn HS for Law and Technology	Brooklyn, NY
F	11	KC Ndefo	6 ft 6 in (1.98 m)	185 lb (84 kg)	Fr	Abraham Lincoln	Elmont, NY
C	12	Majur Majak	7 ft 1 in (2.16 m)	215 lb (98 kg)	Fr	The Patrick School	Juba, South Sudan
G	13	Amir Hicks	5 ft 10 in (1.78 m)	155 lb (70 kg)	Jr	St. Mary (Rutherford, NJ)	Paterson, NJ
F	20	Derrick Woods	6 ft 8 in (2.03 m)	225 lb (102 kg)	RS Jr	St. Bonaventure	Trenton, NJ
G/F	22	Cameron Underwood	6 ft 6 in (1.98 m)	185 lb (84 kg)	So	Lewis and Clark	Spokane, WA
F	23	Samuel Idowu	6 ft 7 in (2.01 m)	240 lb (109 kg)	Sr	Lafayette Educational Complex	Brooklyn, NY
G/F	24	Quinn Taylor	6 ft 4 in (1.93 m)	185 lb (84 kg)	Jr	Tascosa	Amarillo, TX
G	25	Cameron Jones	6 ft 3 in (1.91 m)	195 lb (88 kg)	RS Jr	Pennsbury	Fairless Hills, PA

Head coach

- Shaheen Holloway (Seton Hall)

Assistant coach(es)

- Ryan Whalen (Saint Joseph's)
- Matt Eisele (Pittsburgh)
- John (Seton Hall)

Legend

- (C) Team captain
- (S) Suspended
- (I) Ineligible
- (W) Walk-on
- Injured
- Current redshirt

Roster
Last update: April 17, 2025

== Schedule and results ==
Date time, TV	Rank^{#}	Opponent^{#}	Result	Record	Site (attendance) city, state
Non-conference regular season
November 7, 2018*; 7:00 p.m.		Lafayette	W 93–86	1–0	Yanitelli Center (1,210); Jersey City, NJ
November 10, 2018*; 6:00 p.m.		Delaware	L 75–78	1–1	Yanitelli Center (752); Jersey City, NJ
November 14, 2018*; 7:00 p.m.		at Bryant	L 63–71	1–2	Chace Athletic Center (687); Smithfield, RI
November 20, 2018*; 7:00 p.m., ACCN		at NC State	L 57–85	1–3	PNC Arena (13,308); Raleigh, NC
November 24, 2018*; 4:00 p.m.		at North Texas	L 66–75	1–4	The Super Pit (2,031); Denton, TX
November 28, 2018*; 6:00 p.m., SECN		at No. 8 Auburn	L 49–99	1–5	Auburn Arena (7,162); Auburn, AL
December 1, 2018*; 3:00 p.m.		Maine	W 63–59	2–5	Yanitelli Center (602); Jersey City, NJ
December 4, 2018*; 7:00 p.m., ACCN		at Clemson	L 60–65	2–6	Littlejohn Coliseum (6,254); Clemson, SC
December 8, 2018*; 1:00 p.m.		LIU Brooklyn	L 58–74	2–7	Yanitelli Center (586); Jersey City, NJ
December 15, 2018*; 4:00 p.m.		at St. Francis Brooklyn	L 53–56	2–8	Generoso Pope Athletic Complex (448); Brooklyn, NY
December 19, 2018*; 7:00 p.m.		at Fairleigh Dickinson	L 74–83	2–9	Rothman Center (688); Hackensack, NJ
December 29, 2018*; 1:00 p.m.		Hampton	W 83–80	3–9	Yanitelli Center (649); Jersey City, NJ
MAAC regular season
January 3, 2019; 4:00 p.m.		Siena	W 65–60	4–9 (1–0)	Yanitelli Center (929); Jersey City, NJ
January 5, 2019; 2:00 p.m., ESPN3		at Monmouth	L 44–61	4–10 (1–1)	OceanFirst Bank Center (2,006); West Long Branch, NJ
January 10, 2019; 7:00 p.m., ESPN+		at Fairfield	L 57–60	4–11 (1–2)	Webster Bank Arena (786); Bridgeport, CT
January 13, 2019; 1:00 p.m.		Marist	W 72–63	5–11 (2–2)	Yanitelli Center (713); Jersey City, NJ
January 17, 2019; 7:00 p.m.		Manhattan	L 56–58	5–12 (2–3)	Yanitelli Center (747); Jersey City, NJ
January 22, 2019; 7:00 p.m.		at Niagara	W 74–72	6–12 (3–3)	Gallagher Center (1,039); Lewiston, NY
January 27, 2019; 2:00 p.m., ESPN+		at Quinnipiac	L 58–77	6–13 (3–4)	People's United Center (1,324); Hamden, CT
January 31, 2019; 7:00 p.m., ESPN+		at Rider	L 51–59	6–14 (3–5)	Alumni Gymnasium (1,560); Lawrenceville, NJ
February 2, 2019; 7:00 p.m.		at Manhattan	L 50–64	6–15 (3–6)	Draddy Gymnasium (1,193); Riverdale, NY
February 7, 2019; 7:00 p.m.		Monmouth	L 51–53	6–16 (3–7)	Yanitelli Center (877); Jersey City, NJ
February 10, 2019; 1:00 p.m.		Canisius	L 60–64	6–17 (3–8)	Yanitelli Center (595); Jersey City, NJ
February 15, 2019; 7:00 p.m., ESPN+		at Iona	L 46–62	6–18 (3–9)	Hynes Athletic Center (1,429); New Rochelle, NY
February 17, 2019; 2:00 p.m.		Rider	L 65–71	6–19 (3–10)	Yanitelli Center (514); Jersey City, NJ
February 19, 2019; 7:00 p.m., ESPN+		at Siena	L 62–72	6–20 (3–11)	Times Union Center (6,398); Albany, NY
February 22, 2019; 7:00 p.m., ESPN+		at Marist	W 65–59	7–20 (4–11)	McCann Arena (1,323); Poughkeepsie, NY
February 24, 2019; 2:00 p.m.		Niagara	W 78–60	8–20 (5–11)	Yanitelli Center (535); Jersey City, NJ
March 1, 2019; 7:00 p.m.		Quinnipiac	L 60–77	8–21 (5–12)	Yanitelli Center; Jersey City, NJ
March 3, 2019; 1:00 p.m.		Fairfield	W 62–52	9–21 (6–12)	Yanitelli Center; Jersey City, NJ
MAAC tournament
March 7, 2019; 5:00 p.m., ESPN3	(9)	vs. (8) Marist; First round	W 71–68 ^{OT}	10–21	Times Union Center; Albany, NY
March 8, 2019; 7:00 p.m., ESPN3	(9)	vs. (1) Iona; Quarterfinals	L 71–73	10–22	Times Union Center; Albany, NY
*Non-conference game. ^{#}Rankings from AP poll. (#) Tournament seedings in parentheses. All times are in Eastern.
