= 2018–19 Manhattan Jaspers basketball team =

American college basketball season

2018–19 Manhattan Jaspers basketball
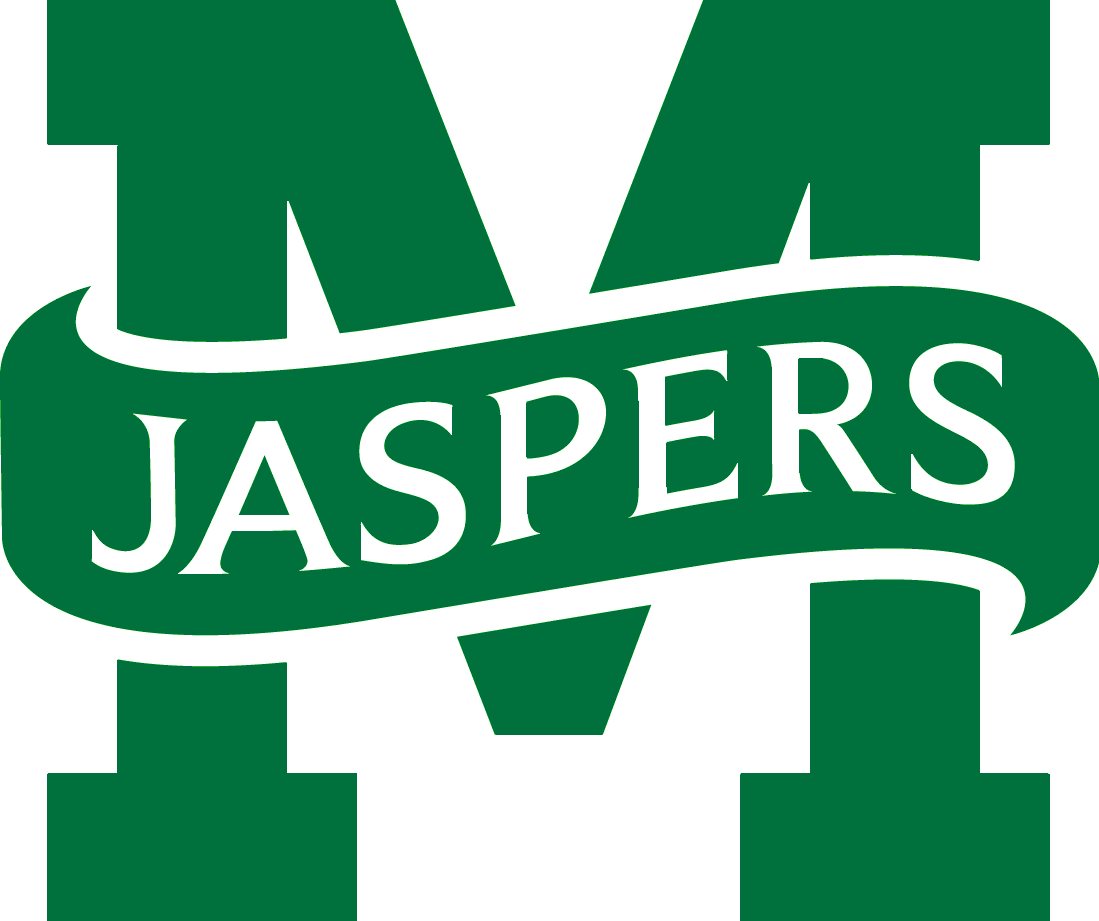
- Conference: Metro Atlantic Athletic Conference
- Record: 11–21 (8–10 MAAC)
- Head coach: Steve Masiello (8th season)
- Assistant coaches: Matt Grady; Doug Thibault; RaShawn Stores
- Home arena: Draddy Gymnasium

2018–19 MAAC men's basketball standings
	Conf.				Overall
Team	W		L	PCT	W		L	PCT
Iona †	12	–	6	.667	17	–	16	.515
Canisius	11	–	7	.611	15	–	17	.469
Quinnipiac	11	–	7	.611	16	–	15	.516
Rider	11	–	7	.611	16	–	15	.516
Siena	11	–	7	.611	17	–	16	.515
Monmouth	10	–	8	.556	14	–	21	.400
Manhattan	8	–	10	.444	11	–	21	.344
Marist	7	–	11	.389	12	–	19	.387
Saint Peter's	6	–	12	.333	10	–	22	.313
Fairfield	6	–	12	.333	9	–	22	.290
Niagara	6	–	12	.333	13	–	19	.406
† 2019 MAAC tournament winner

The 2018–19 Manhattan Jaspers basketball team represented Manhattan College during the 2018–19 NCAA Division I men's basketball season. The Jaspers, who were led by eighth-year head coach Steve Masiello, played their home games at Draddy Gymnasium in Riverdale, New York as members of the Metro Atlantic Athletic Conference (MAAC). They finished the season 11–21 overall, 8–10 in MAAC play, to finish in seventh place. As the No. 7 seed in the 2019 MAAC tournament, they defeated No. 10 seed Fairfield in the first round before falling to No. 2 seed Canisius in the quarterfinals.

== Previous season ==
The Jaspers finished the 2017–18 season 14–17, 9–9 in MAAC play, to finish in a tie for fifth place. They lost in the quarterfinals of the MAAC tournament to Iona.

== Roster ==
2018–19 Manhattan Jaspers men's basketball team
Players
Coaches

Pos.	#	Name	Height	Weight	Year	Hometown
F	0	Warren Williams	6 ft 9 in (2.06 m)	240 lb (109 kg)	RS Fr	Kingston, Jamaica
G	1	Matthew Glassman	6 ft 0 in (1.83 m)	175 lb (79 kg)	Fr	Bedford, NH
G	2	Ethan Lasko	6 ft 2 in (1.88 m)	175 lb (79 kg)	So	Hollywood, FL
G	3	Elijah Buchanan	6 ft 5 in (1.96 m)	190 lb (86 kg)	Fr	The Bronx, NY
G	4	Samir Stewart	6 ft 0 in (1.83 m)	180 lb (82 kg)	Fr	Fort Lauderdale, FL
G	5	Jesse Boyce	6 ft 2 in (1.88 m)	190 lb (86 kg)	Jr	Thornwood, NY
G	10	Nehemiah Mack	6 ft 1 in (1.85 m)	190 lb (86 kg)	So	Harrisburg, PA
F	11	Daniel Schreier	6 ft 9 in (2.06 m)	220 lb (100 kg)	Fr	Santa Monica, CA
G	12	Christian Hinckson	6 ft 7 in (2.01 m)	210 lb (95 kg)	Fr	Queens, NY
F	14	Tyler Reynolds	6 ft 7 in (2.01 m)	215 lb (98 kg)	Jr	Syracuse, NY
G	21	Matt Maloney	6 ft 1 in (1.85 m)	180 lb (82 kg)	Sr	Somers, NY
G	22	Thomas Capuano	6 ft 0 in (1.83 m)	180 lb (82 kg)	Sr	Hastings-on-Hudson, NY
G	23	Tykei Greene	6 ft 4 in (1.93 m)	205 lb (93 kg)	Fr	Queens, NY
F	24	Ebube Ebube	6 ft 7 in (2.01 m)	220 lb (100 kg)	So	San Juan, Puerto Rico
F	30	Ibrahima Diallo	6 ft 10 in (2.08 m)	245 lb (111 kg)	Sr	Dakar, Senegal
F	32	Kevin Salis	6 ft 6 in (1.98 m)	210 lb (95 kg)	So	Cornwall, NY
F	33	Pauly Paulicap	6 ft 8 in (2.03 m)	220 lb (100 kg)	Jr	Elmont, NY
G	52	Samson Usilo	6 ft 4 in (1.93 m)	215 lb (98 kg)	Sr	Lagos, Nigeria

Head coach

- Steve Masiello (Kentucky)

Assistant coach(es)

- Matt Grady (Saint Joseph's)
- Doug Thibault (Boise State)
- Rashawn Stores (Manhattan)

Legend

- (C) Team captain
- (S) Suspended
- (I) Ineligible
- (W) Walk-on
- Injured
- Current redshirt

Roster
Last update: March 9, 2025

== Schedule and results ==
Date time, TV	Rank^{#}	Opponent^{#}	Result	Record	Site (attendance) city, state
Non-conference regular season
November 6, 2018*; 8:30 p.m., ESPN3		Elon	L 56–62	0–1	Draddy Gymnasium (937); Riverdale, NY
November 12, 2018*; 7:00 p.m., ESPN+		at UMBC	L 52–75	0–2	UMBC Event Center (1,164); Catonsville, MD
November 16, 2018*; 4:30 p.m., ESPN3		vs. Coastal Carolina; NKU Basketball Classic	W 55–53	1–2	BB&T Arena (318); Highland Heights, KY
November 17, 2018*; 3:30 p.m., ESPN3		at Northern Kentucky; NKU Basketball Classic	L 53–59	1–3	BB&T Arena (3,351); Highland Heights, Kentucky
November 18, 2018*; 3:30 p.m., ESPN3		vs. UNC Asheville; NKU Basketball Classic	W 54–38	2–3	BB&T Arena (113); Highland Heights, Kentucky
November 24, 2018*; 4:00 p.m., ESPN+		at George Washington	L 43–70	2–4	Charles E. Smith Center (1,590); Washington, D.C.
December 1, 2018*; 7:00 p.m.		Fordham; Battle of the Bronx	L 56–57	2–5	Draddy Gymnasium (2,023); Riverdale, NY
December 5, 2018*; 7:00 p.m.		Stony Brook	L 62–69	2–6	Draddy Gymnasium (862); Riverdale, NY
December 10, 2018*; 7:00 p.m.		Hofstra	L 50–80	2–7	Draddy Gymnasium (602); Riverdale, NY
December 15, 2018*; 8:00 p.m., ESPN3		at UConn	L 46–61	2–8	Harry A. Gampel Pavilion (6,259); Storrs, CT
December 20, 2018*; 7:00 p.m., ESPN+		at Albany	L 67–77	2–9	SEFCU Arena (1,412); Albany, NY
December 23, 2018*; 2:00 p.m.		at St. Francis Brooklyn	L 56–72	2–10	Generoso Pope Athletic Complex (612); Brooklyn, NY
MAAC regular season
January 3, 2019; 7:00 p.m.		Quinnipiac	L 59–63	2–11 (0–1)	Draddy Gymnasium (612); Riverdale, NY
January 5, 2019; 7:00 p.m.		Niagara	W 90–80	3–11 (1–1)	Draddy Gymnasium (801); Riverdale, NY
January 8, 2019; 7:00 p.m., ESPN+		at Marist	L 63–78	3–12 (1–2)	McCann Arena (985); Poughkeepsie, NY
January 12, 2019; 2:00 p.m., ESPN3		at Monmouth	L 49–65	3–13 (1–3)	OceanFirst Bank Center (1,745); West Long Branch, NJ
January 17, 2019; 7:00 p.m.		at Saint Peter's	W 58–56	4–13 (2–3)	Yanitelli Center (747); Jersey City, NJ
January 19, 2019; 7:00 p.m., ESPN3		at Rider	L 47–60	4–14 (2–4)	Alumni Gymnasium (1,219); Lawrenceville, NJ
January 21, 2019; 7:00 p.m., ESPN+		Marist	L 46–62	4–15 (2–5)	Draddy Gymnasium (894); Riverdale, NY
January 26, 2019; 7:00 p.m., ESPN3		at Siena	L 40–53	4–16 (2–6)	Times Union Center (7,146); Albany, NY
January 31, 2019; 7:00 p.m.		Fairfield	W 62–49	5–16 (3–6)	Draddy Gymnasium (924); Riverdale, NY
February 2, 2019; 7:00 p.m.		Saint Peter's	W 64–50	6–16 (4–6)	Draddy Gymnasium (1,193); Riverdale, NY
February 5, 2019; 7:00 p.m., ESPN+		Rider	W 73–66	7–16 (5–6)	Draddy Gymnasium (937); Riverdale, NY
February 8, 2019; 7:00 p.m.		Siena	L 49–51	7–17 (5–7)	Draddy Gymnasium (1,364); Riverdale, NY
February 15, 2019; 7:00 p.m.		at Niagara	W 64–60	8–17 (6–7)	Gallagher Center (930); Lewiston, NY
February 17, 2019; 2:00 p.m., ESPN+		at Canisius	W 70–65	9–17 (7–7)	Koessler Athletic Center (1,058); Buffalo, NY
February 22, 2019; 7:00 p.m., Jaspervision		Iona	L 52–66	9–18 (7–8)	Draddy Gymnasium (1,879); Riverdale, NY
February 24, 2019; 3:30 p.m., ESPN+		at Fairfield	L 59–72	9–19 (7–9)	Alumni Hall (2,017); Fairfield, CT
March 1, 2019; 7:00 p.m.		Monmouth; Senior Night	L 54–62	9–20 (7–10)	Draddy Gymnasium (944); Riverdale, NY
March 3, 2019; 2:00 p.m., ESPN+		at Quinnipiac	W 62–58	10–20 (8–10)	People's United Center (2,405); Hamden, CT
MAAC tournament
March 7, 2019; 7:00 p.m., ESPN3	(7)	vs. (10) Fairfield; First round	W 57-53	11-20	Times Union Center; Albany, NY
March 8, 2019; 9:30 p.m., ESPN3	(7)	vs. (2) Canisius; Quarterfinals	L 65–69 ^{OT}	11–21	Times Union Center; Albany, NY
*Non-conference game. ^{#}Rankings from AP poll. (#) Tournament seedings in parentheses. All times are in Eastern.
