= 2018–19 Siena Saints men's basketball team =

American college basketball season

2018–19 Siena Saints men's basketball
- Conference: Metro Atlantic Athletic Conference
- Record: 17–16 (11–7 MAAC)
- Head coach: Jamion Christian (1st season)
- Assistant coaches: Graham Bousley; Ryan Devlin; Carmen Maciariello
- Home arena: Times Union Center

2018–19 MAAC men's basketball standings
	Conf.				Overall
Team	W		L	PCT	W		L	PCT
Iona †	12	–	6	.667	17	–	16	.515
Canisius	11	–	7	.611	15	–	17	.469
Quinnipiac	11	–	7	.611	16	–	15	.516
Rider	11	–	7	.611	16	–	15	.516
Siena	11	–	7	.611	17	–	16	.515
Monmouth	10	–	8	.556	14	–	21	.400
Manhattan	8	–	10	.444	11	–	21	.344
Marist	7	–	11	.389	12	–	19	.387
Saint Peter's	6	–	12	.333	10	–	22	.313
Fairfield	6	–	12	.333	9	–	22	.290
Niagara	6	–	12	.333	13	–	19	.406
† 2019 MAAC tournament winner

The 2018–19 Siena Saints men's basketball team represented Siena College during the 2018–19 NCAA Division I men's basketball season. They played their home games at the Times Union Center in Albany, New York as members of the Metro Atlantic Athletic Conference and were led by first-year head coach Jamion Christian. They finished the 2018–19 season 17–16 overall, 11–7 in MAAC play to finish in a four-way tie for second place. As the 5th seed in the 2019 MAAC tournament, they defeated No. 4 seed Rider in the quarterfinals 87–81 before falling to No. 1 seed Iona 57–73 in the semifinals.

On March 21, 2019, head coach Jamion Christian left his job with Siena to become the new head coach at George Washington. The school promoted assistant coach Carmen Maciariello to fill the vacancy on March 26.

== Previous season ==
The Saints finished the 2017–18 season 8–24, 4–14 in MAAC play to finish in a tie for tenth place. They lost in the first round of the MAAC tournament to Quinnipiac.

On April 13, 2018, head coach Jimmy Patsos resigned amid an investigation regarding abusive conduct and financial improprieties within the program. On May 2, the Saints hired Mount St. Mary's head coach Jamion Christian for the job.

== Roster ==
2018–19 Siena Saints men's basketball team
Players
Coaches

Pos.	#	Name	Height	Weight	Year	Hometown
G	0	Don Carey	6 ft 5 in (1.96 m)	187 lb (85 kg)	So	Upper Marlboro, Maryland
G	1	Braedon Bayer	6 ft 4 in (1.93 m)	186 lb (84 kg)	Sr	Lagrangeville, New York
G	2	Paulo Morastoni	6 ft 3 in (1.91 m)	200 lb (91 kg)	Sr	Blumenau, Brazil
G/F	3	Manny Camper	6 ft 6 in (1.98 m)	208 lb (94 kg)	So	Worton, Maryland
G	5	Kadeem Smithen	6 ft 3 in (1.91 m)	165 lb (75 kg)	RS Sr	Ajax, Ontario, Canada
F	11	Thomas Huerter, Jr.	6 ft 7 in (2.01 m)	218 lb (99 kg)	Jr	Clifton Park, New York
G	13	Ben Diamond	5 ft 10 in (1.78 m)	150 lb (68 kg)	Jr	Loudonville, New York
G	14	Khalil Richard	6 ft 0 in (1.83 m)	179 lb (81 kg)	Jr	Baltimore, Maryland
G	15	Robert Mahala	6 ft 4 in (1.93 m)	166 lb (75 kg)	Fr	Jackson, New Jersey
G	22	Jalen Pickett	6 ft 4 in (1.93 m)	190 lb (86 kg)	Fr	Rochester, New York
G	23	Sloan Seymour	6 ft 9 in (2.06 m)	205 lb (93 kg)	Fr	Albany, New York
G	24	Jimmy Ratliff	6 ft 8 in (2.03 m)	181 lb (82 kg)	RS Fr	Middletown, Ohio
F	32	Evan Fisher	6 ft 9 in (2.06 m)	246 lb (112 kg)	Sr	Pasadena, Maryland
G	33	Georges Darwwiche	6 ft 1 in (1.85 m)	183 lb (83 kg)	Fr	Bucharest, Romania
F	34	Kevin Degnan	6 ft 9 in (2.06 m)	220 lb (100 kg)	RS Sr	Pearl River, New York
F	35	Sammy Friday IV	6 ft 9 in (2.06 m)	239 lb (108 kg)	So	Jersey City, New Jersey
F	42	Denzel Tchougang	6 ft 10 in (2.08 m)	211 lb (96 kg)	So	Geneva, Switzerland

Head coach

- Jamion Christian (Mount St. Mary's)

Assistant coach(es)

- Graham Bousley (Wisconsin)
- Ryan Devlin (Pittsburgh)
- Carmen Maciariello (Siena)

Legend

- (C) Team captain
- (S) Suspended
- (I) Ineligible
- (W) Walk-on
- Injured
- Current redshirt

Roster
Last update: November 14, 2018

== Schedule and results ==
Date time, TV	Rank^{#}	Opponent^{#}	Result	Record	Site (attendance) city, state
Non-conference regular season
Nov 6, 2018*; 6:30 pm, FSN		at Providence; Hall of Fame Tip Off campus game	L 67–77	0–1	Dunkin' Donuts Center (8,021); Providence, RI
Nov 8, 2018*; 8:30 pm, ESPN+		at George Washington; Hall of Fame Tip Off campus game	W 69–61	1–1	Charles E. Smith Center (2,083); Washington, D.C.
Nov 16, 2018*; 8:30 pm, ESPN3		vs. Norfolk State; Hall of Fame Tip Off Springfield semifinals	W 61–58	2–1	Mohegan Sun Arena (1,313); Uncasville, CT
Nov 18, 2018*; 11:00 am, ESPN3		vs. Holy Cross; Hall of Fame Tip Off Springfield Championship	L 45–57	2–2	Mohegan Sun Arena; Uncasville, CT
Nov 21, 2018*; 6:00 pm		Lehigh	L 69–80	2–3	Times Union Center (4,908); Albany, NY
Nov 24, 2018*; 2:00 pm		Colgate	L 79–84	2–4	Times Union Center (5,202); Albany, NY
Nov 28, 2018*; 7:00 pm		at Hofstra	L 86–94	2–5	Mack Sports Complex (1,046); Hempstead, NY
Dec 1, 2018*; 3:00 pm, ESPN+		Harvard	W 67–64	3–5	Times Union Center (5,650); Albany, NY
Dec 5, 2018*; 7:00 pm, ESPN+		at St. Bonaventure	L 40–82	3–6	Reilly Center (3,485); Olean, NY
Dec 8, 2018*; 4:00 pm, ESPN+		at Robert Morris	W 74–71	4–6	North Athletic Complex (1,016); Pittsburgh, PA
Dec 18, 2018*; 7:00 pm, ESPN+		College of Charleston	L 58–83	4–7	Times Union Center (4614); Albany, NY
Dec 22, 2018*; 12:05 pm		at Holy Cross	L 57–60	4–8	Hart Center (1346); Worcester, MA
Dec 29, 2018*; 2:00 pm, MY-4		Cal Poly	W 75–54	5–8	Times Union Center (5,768); Albany, NY
MAAC regular season
Jan 3, 2019; 4:00 pm		at Saint Peter's	L 60–65	5–9 (0–1)	Yanitelli Center (929); Jersey City, NJ
Jan 5, 2019; 7:00 pm		Canisius	L 66–70	5–10 (0–2)	Times Union Center (6,432); Albany, NY
Jan 11, 2019; 7:00 pm, ESPNU		at Marist	W 71–66	6–10 (1–2)	McCann Field House (1,678); Poughkeepsie, NY
Jan 14, 2019; 7:00 pm		Monmouth	L 60–63 ^{OT}	6–11 (1–3)	Times Union Center (5,592); Albany, NY
Jan 17, 2019; 7:00 pm		Niagara	W 66–57	7–11 (2–3)	Times Union Center (5,549); Albany, NY
Jan 24, 2019; 7:00 pm, ESPN+		at Fairfield	W 57–48	8–11 (3–3)	Webster Bank Arena (1,011); Bridgeport, CT
Jan 26, 2019; 7:00 pm		Manhattan	W 53–40	9–11 (4–3)	Times Union Center (7,146); Albany, NY
Jan 31, 2019; 7:00 pm, ESPN3		at Monmouth	L 55–66	9–12 (4–4)	OceanFirst Bank Center (1,743); West Long Branch, NJ
Feb 2, 2019; 1:00 pm, ESPN3		at Iona	W 56–54	10–12 (5–4)	Hynes Athletic Center (1,537); New Rochelle, NY
Feb 4, 2019; 7:00 pm, ESPN3		Fairfield	W 61–50	11–12 (6–4)	Times Union Center (5,251); Albany, NY
Feb 8, 2019; 7:00 pm		at Manhattan	W 51–49	12–12 (7–4)	Draddy Gymnasium (1,364); Riverdale, NY
Feb 10, 2019; 2:00 pm, ESPN+		at Rider	W 59–57	13–12 (8–4)	Alumni Gymnasium (1,559); Lawrenceville, NJ
Feb 13, 2019; 7:00 pm, ESPN+		Iona	L 52–57	13–13 (8–5)	Times Union Center (5,560); Albany, NY
Feb 17, 2019; 2:00 pm, ESPN+		Quinnipiac	L 100–107 ^{3OT}	13–14 (8–6)	Times Union Center (7,146); Albany, NY
Feb 19, 2019; 7:00 pm, ESPN+		Saint Peter's	W 72–62	14–14 (9–6)	Times Union Center (6,398); Albany, NY
Feb 24, 2019; 2:00 pm, ESPN+		Marist	W 67–55	15–14 (10–6)	Times Union Center (6,806); Albany, NY
Mar 1, 2019; 9:00 pm, ESPNU		at Canisius	L 62–68	15–15 (10–7)	Koessler Athletic Center (1,263); Buffalo, NY
Mar 3, 2019; 2:00 pm		at Niagara	W 72–65 ^{OT}	16–15 (11–7)	Gallagher Center (1,378); Lewiston, NY
MAAC tournament
Mar 9, 2019; 9:30 pm, ESPN3	(5)	(4) Rider; Quarterfinals	W 87–81	17–15	Times Union Center; Albany, NY
Mar 10, 2019; 6:00 pm, ESPN3	(5)	(1) Iona; Semifinals	L 57–73	17–16	Times Union Center; Albany, NY
*Non-conference game. ^{#}Rankings from AP Poll. (#) Tournament seedings in parentheses. All times are in Eastern Time.
