= 2018–19 Fairfield Stags men's basketball team =

American college basketball season

2018–19 Fairfield Stags men's basketball
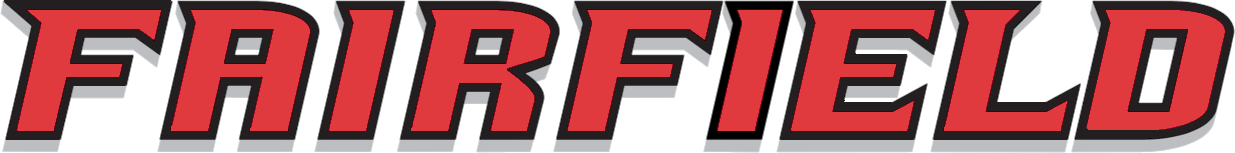
- Conference: Metro Atlantic Athletic Conference
- Record: 9–22 (6–12 MAAC)
- Head coach: Sydney Johnson (8th season)
- Assistant coaches: Mitch Buonaguro; Tom Parrotta; Tyson Wheeler
- Home arena: Webster Bank Arena; Alumni Hall

2018–19 MAAC men's basketball standings
	Conf.				Overall
Team	W		L	PCT	W		L	PCT
Iona †	12	–	6	.667	17	–	16	.515
Canisius	11	–	7	.611	15	–	17	.469
Quinnipiac	11	–	7	.611	16	–	15	.516
Rider	11	–	7	.611	16	–	15	.516
Siena	11	–	7	.611	17	–	16	.515
Monmouth	10	–	8	.556	14	–	21	.400
Manhattan	8	–	10	.444	11	–	21	.344
Marist	7	–	11	.389	12	–	19	.387
Saint Peter's	6	–	12	.333	10	–	22	.313
Fairfield	6	–	12	.333	9	–	22	.290
Niagara	6	–	12	.333	13	–	19	.406
† 2019 MAAC tournament winner

The 2018–19 Fairfield Stags men's basketball team represented Fairfield University in the 2018–19 NCAA Division I men's basketball season. They played their home games at Webster Bank Arena in Bridgeport, Connecticut and Alumni Hall in Fairfield, Connecticut as members of the Metro Atlantic Athletic Conference, and were led by eighth year head coach Sydney Johnson. They finished the 2018–19 season 9–22 overall, 6–12 in MAAC play to finish in a three-way tie for ninth place. As the 10th seed in the 2019 MAAC tournament, they were defeated by No. 7 seed Manhattan in the first round 53–57.

On March 11, 2019, head coach Sydney Johnson was fired. He finished at Fairfield with an eight-year record of 116–147.

== Previous season ==
The Stags finished the 2017–18 season 17–16, 9–9 in MAAC play to finish in a tie for fifth place. As the No. 6 seed at the MAAC tournament, they defeated No. 11 seed Marist, upset No. 3 seed Niagara and No. 7 seed Quinnipiac to advance to the championship game, where they lost to Iona.

== Roster ==
2018–19 Fairfield Stags men's basketball team
Players
Coaches

Pos.	#	Name	Height	Weight	Year	Previous school	Hometown
G	0	Neftali Alvarez	6 ft 2 in (1.88 m)	165 lb (75 kg)	Fr	Miami Christian School	Cataño, Puerto Rico
G	1	Felix Lemetti	6 ft 2 in (1.88 m)	175 lb (79 kg)	Fr	Fryshuset Gymnasium	Stockholm, Sweden
G	2	Taj Benning	6 ft 3 in (1.91 m)	185 lb (84 kg)	So	Bergen Catholic	Fair Lawn, NJ
G	5	Aidas Kavaliauskas	6 ft 1 in (1.85 m)	175 lb (79 kg)	Jr	SPIRE Academy	Kaunas, Lithuania
G	10	Thomas Nolan	6 ft 3 in (1.91 m)	195 lb (88 kg)	Sr	Fairfield Prep	Trumbull, CT
G	11	Calvin Whipple	6 ft 4 in (1.93 m)	185 lb (84 kg)	Fr	Northfield Mount Hermon	Leominster, MA
F	12	Kevin Senghore-Peterson	6 ft 6 in (1.98 m)	220 lb (100 kg)	So	Marksgymnasium	Frölunda, Sweden
F	13	Jonathan Kasibabu	6 ft 8 in (2.03 m)	240 lb (109 kg)	Sr	Westtown School	Kinshasa, Democratic Republic of the Congo
F	14	Matija Milin	6 ft 9 in (2.06 m)	215 lb (98 kg)	Sr	Sports Gymnasium	Belgrade, Serbia
F	15	Wassef Methnani	6 ft 8 in (2.03 m)	208 lb (94 kg)	So	The Knox School	Kairouan, Tunisia
G	24	Jesus Cruz	6 ft 5 in (1.96 m)	210 lb (95 kg)	So	Loomis Chaffee School	Puerto Rico
G	25	Landon Taliaferro	6 ft 3 in (1.91 m)	185 lb (84 kg)	Jr	Laramie County CC	Boulder, CO
F	30	Omar El-Sheikh	6 ft 7 in (2.01 m)	195 lb (88 kg)	So	The Knox School	Cairo, Egypt

Head coach

- Sydney Johnson (Princeton)

Assistant coach(es)

- Mitch Buonaguro (Boston College)
- Tom Parrotta (Fordham)
- Tyson Wheeler (Rhode Island)

Legend

- (C) Team captain
- (S) Suspended
- (I) Ineligible
- (W) Walk-on
- Injured
- Current redshirt

Roster
Last update: December 25, 2018

== Schedule and results ==
Date time, TV	Rank^{#}	Opponent^{#}	Result	Record	Site (attendance) city, state
Non-conference regular season
November 6, 2018*; 7:00 pm		at No. 24 Purdue	L 57–90	0–1	Mackey Arena (14,323); West Lafayette, Indiana
November 10, 2018*; 7:00 pm		at Bucknell	W 60–58	1–1	Sojka Pavilion (3,183); Lewisburg, Pennsylvania
November 13, 2018*; 7:30 pm		LIU Brooklyn	L 87–89	1–2	Webster Bank Arena (1,017); Bridgeport, Connecticut
November 17, 2018*; 1:00 pm		Wagner	L 73–79	1–3	Webster Bank Arena; Bridgeport, Connecticut
November 23, 2018*; 6:00 pm		vs. Longwood; Elgin Baylor Classic	L 65–67	1–4	Redhawk Center (618); Seattle, Washington
November 24, 2018*; 6:00 pm		at Seattle; Elgin Baylor Classic	L 80–83	1–5	Redhawk Center (809); Seattle, Washington
November 25, 2018*; 3:00 pm		vs. Denver; Elgin Baylor Classic	W 86–85	2–5	Redhawk Center (999); Seattle, Washington
December 1, 2018*; 1:00 pm		at Army	L 60–63	2–6	Christl Arena (723); West Point, New York
December 6, 2018*; 7:00 pm		Oakland	L 86–87	2–7	Alumni Hall (1,871); Fairfield, Connecticut
December 9, 2018*; 1:00 pm		at Old Dominion	L 69–79	2–8	Ted Constant Convocation Center (4,297); Norfolk, Virginia
December 16, 2018*; 1:00 pm		at Boston College	L 67–77	2–9	Conte Forum (4,664); Chestnut Hill, Massachusetts
December 22, 2018*; 1:00 pm		at New Hampshire	W 63–57	3–9	Lundholm Gym (493); Durham, New Hampshire
MAAC regular season
January 3, 2019; 7:00 pm, ESPN+		Rider	L 82–83	3–10 (0–1)	Alumni Hall (1,021); Fairfield, Connecticut
January 5, 2019; 1:00 pm, ESPN3		at Iona	L 87–94	3–11 (0–2)	Hynes Athletic Center (1,168); New Rochelle, New York
January 7, 2019; 7:00 pm, ESPN3		Niagara	W 77–59	4–11 (1–2)	Alumni Hall (1,037); Fairfield, Connecticut
January 10, 2019; 7:00 pm, ESPN+		Saint Peter's	W 60–57	5–11 (2–2)	Webster Bank Arena (786); Bridgeport, Connecticut
January 13, 2019; 2:00 pm, ESPN3		at Quinnipiac	L 78–80	5–12 (2–3)	People's United Center (1,547); Hamden, Connecticut
January 17, 2019; 7:00 pm, ESPN3		at Monmouth	L 57–74	5–13 (2–4)	OceanFirst Bank Center (1,722); West Long Branch, New Jersey
January 19, 2019; 1:00 pm, ESPN3		Canisius	L 68–73	5–14 (2–5)	Alumni Hall (1,281); Fairfield, Connecticut
January 24, 2019; 7:00 pm, ESPN+		Siena	L 48–57	5–15 (2–6)	Webster Bank Arena (1,011); Bridgeport, Connecticut
January 27, 2019; 1:00 pm, ESPN+		Iona	W 80–68	6–15 (3–6)	Alumni Hall (2,479); Fairfield, Connecticut
January 31, 2019; 7:00 pm, Jasper Sports Network		at Manhattan	L 49–62	6–16 (3–7)	Draddy Gymnasium (924); Riverdale, New York
February 2, 2019; 7:00 pm, ESPN3		at Marist	W 57–52	7–16 (4–7)	McCann Arena (1,455); Poughkeepsie, New York
February 4, 2019; 7:00 pm, ESPN3		at Siena	L 50–61	7–17 (4–8)	Times Union Center (5,251); Albany, New York
February 9, 2019; 1:00 pm, ESPN3		Monmouth	L 49–61	7–18 (4–9)	Webster Bank Arena (1,281); Bridgeport, Connecticut
February 15, 2019; 7:00 pm, ESPN+		at Canisius	L 68–72	7–19 (4–10)	Koessler Athletic Center (1,039); Buffalo, New York
February 17, 2019; 2:00 pm, Niagara Sports Network		at Niagara	L 73–78	7–20 (4–11)	Gallagher Center (1,023); Lewiston, New York
February 24, 2019; 3:30 pm, ESPN+		Manhattan	W 72–59	8–20 (5–11)	Alumni Hall (2,017); Fairfield, Connecticut
March 1, 2019; 7:00 pm, ESPN+		Marist	W 59–44	9–20 (6–11)	Alumni Hall; Fairfield, Connecticut
March 3, 2019; 1:00 pm, SPU Athletics on YouTube		at Saint Peter's	L 52–62	9–21 (6–12)	Yanitelli Center; Jersey City, New Jersey
MAAC tournament
March 7, 2019; 7:00 pm, ESPN3	(10)	vs. (7) Manhattan; First Round	L 53–57	9–22	Times Union Center; Albany, New York
*Non-conference game. ^{#}Rankings from AP Poll. (#) Tournament seedings in parentheses. All times are in Eastern.
