= 2019 MAAC men's basketball tournament =

- Classification: Division I
- Season: 2018–19
- Teams: 11
- Site: Times Union Center; Albany, New York
- Champions: Iona (12th title)
- Winning coach: Tim Cluess (5th title)
- MVP: Rickey McGill (Iona)
- Attendance: 26,532
- Top scorer: E.J. Crawford (Iona) (59 points)
- Television: ESPN2, ESPNU, ESPN3

2018–19 MAAC men's basketball standings
| | Conf. | | | | Overall |
| Team | W | | L | PCT | W | | L | PCT |
|---|---|---|---|---|---|---|---|---|
| Iona † | 12 | – | 6 | .667 | 17 | – | 16 | .515 |
| Canisius | 11 | – | 7 | .611 | 15 | – | 17 | .469 |
| Quinnipiac | 11 | – | 7 | .611 | 16 | – | 15 | .516 |
| Rider | 11 | – | 7 | .611 | 16 | – | 15 | .516 |
| Siena | 11 | – | 7 | .611 | 17 | – | 16 | .515 |
| Monmouth | 10 | – | 8 | .556 | 14 | – | 21 | .400 |
| Manhattan | 8 | – | 10 | .444 | 11 | – | 21 | .344 |
| Marist | 7 | – | 11 | .389 | 12 | – | 19 | .387 |
| Saint Peter's | 6 | – | 12 | .333 | 10 | – | 22 | .313 |
| Fairfield | 6 | – | 12 | .333 | 9 | – | 22 | .290 |
| Niagara | 6 | – | 12 | .333 | 13 | – | 19 | .406 |
† 2019 MAAC tournament winner

The 2019 Metro Atlantic Athletic Conference men's basketball tournament was the postseason men's basketball tournament for the Metro Atlantic Athletic Conference for the 2018–19 NCAA Division I men's basketball season. It was held from March 7–11, 2019 at the Times Union Center in Albany, New York. This marked the 20th time the tournament was played at the Times Union Center. No. 1 seed Iona defeated No. 6 seed Monmouth in the championship game 81–60 to win the conference's automatic bid to the 2019 NCAA tournament. With the win, Iona became the first MAAC team to win four consecutive MAAC Tournament championships, while also making this their MAAC-record leading seventh consecutive championship game appearance. Monmouth was the second consecutive No. 6 seed to make the championship game in the tournament, and fourth overall.

== Seeds ==
All 11 teams in the conference participate in the Tournament. The top five teams receive byes to the quarterfinals. Teams were seeded by record within the conference, with a tiebreaker system to seed teams with identical conference records.

| Seed | School | Conference | Tiebreaker 1 | Tiebreaker 2 |
|---|---|---|---|---|
| 1 | Iona | 12–6 | | |
| 2 | Canisius | 11–7 | 5–1 vs. QU/Rider/Siena | |
| 3 | Quinnipiac | 11–7 | 2–3 vs. Canisius/Rider/Siena | 1–1 vs. Iona |
| 4 | Rider | 11–7 | 2–3 vs. Canisius/QU/Siena | 0–2 vs. Iona |
| 5 | Siena | 11–7 | 1–3 vs. Canisius/QU/Rider | |
| 6 | Monmouth | 10–8 | | |
| 7 | Manhattan | 8–10 | | |
| 8 | Marist | 7–11 | | |
| 9 | Saint Peter's | 6–12 | 3–1 vs. Fairfield/Niagara | |
| 10 | Fairfield | 6–12 | 2–2 vs. SPU/Niagara | |
| 11 | Niagara | 6–12 | 1–3 vs. SPU/Fairfield | |

== Schedule ==
| Session | Game | Time* | Matchup | Score | Television |
First round – Thursday, March 7
| 1 | 1 | 5:00 pm | No. 8 Marist vs No. 9 Saint Peter's | 68–71 ^{OT} | ESPN3 |
| 1 | 2 | 7:00 pm | No. 7 Manhattan vs No. 10 Fairfield | 57–53 | ESPN3 |
| 1 | 3 | 10:00 pm | No. 6 Monmouth vs No. 11 Niagara | 76–72 | ESPN3 |
Quarterfinals – Friday, March 8
| 2 | 4 | 7:00 pm | No. 1 Iona vs No. 9 Saint Peter's | 73–71 | ESPN3 |
| 2 | 5 | 9:30 pm | No. 2 Canisius vs No. 7 Manhattan | 69–65 ^{OT} | ESPN3 |
Quarterfinals – Saturday, March 9
| 3 | 6 | 7:00 pm | No. 3 Quinnipiac vs No. 6 Monmouth | 92–98 | ESPN3 |
| 3 | 7 | 9:30 pm | No. 4 Rider vs No. 5 Siena | 81–87 | ESPN3 |
Semifinals – Sunday, March 10
| 4 | 8 | 6:00 pm | No. 1 Iona vs No. 5 Siena | 73–57 | ESPN3 |
| 4 | 9 | 8:30 pm | No. 2 Canisius vs No. 6 Monmouth | 59–73 | ESPNU |
Championship – Monday, March 11
| 5 | 10 | 9:00 pm | No. 1 Iona vs No. 6 Monmouth | 81–60 | ESPN2 |
*Game times in ET. *Rankings denote tournament seeding.

== Bracket ==
First round Thursday, March 7 ESPN3
8 | Marist | 68
9 | Saint Peter's | 71^{OT}
7 | Manhattan | 57
10 | Fairfield | 53
6 | Monmouth | 76
11 | Niagara | 72

Quarterfinals; Friday/Saturday, March 8/9; ESPN3
1 | Iona | 73
9 | Saint Peter's | 71
4 | Rider | 81
5 | Siena | 87
2 | Canisius | 69
7 | Manhattan | 65^{OT}
3 | Quinnipiac | 92
6 | Monmouth | 98

Semifinals; Sunday, March 10; ESPN3/ESPNU
1 | Iona | 73
5 | Siena | 57
2 | Canisius | 59
6 | Monmouth | 73

Championship; Monday, March 11; ESPN2
1 | Iona | 81
6 | Monmouth | 60

== Game summaries ==
=== First round ===
ESPN3

March 7, 2019
5:00 pm

Recap

No. 8 Marist 68, No. 9 Saint Peter's 71 (OT)
Scoring by half: 37–27, 26–36 Overtime: 5–8
| Pts: Parker – 22; Rebs: Lamb – 6 Asts: Parker – 4 Funk – 18 pts | Pts: Turner – 18; Rebs: Idowu – 8 Asts: Watson & Turner – 3 Watson – 17 pts |

Times Union Center
Albany, NY
Referees: Robert Riley, Ron Tyburski, Andy O'Brien

ESPN3

March 7, 2019
7:00 pm

Recap

No. 7 Manhattan 57, No. 10 Fairfield 53
Scoring by half: 30–33, 27–20
| Pts: Hinckson – 16; Rebs: Ebube – 6 Asts: Mack & Ebube – 2 Williams – 10 points | Pts: Alvarez – 18; Rebs: Kasibabu – 6 Asts: Benning – 3 Taliaferro – 12 pts |

Times Union Center
Albany, NY
Referees: Donald Eppley, D.J. Carstensen, Brandon Cruz

ESPN3

March 7, 2019
10:00 pm

Recap

No. 6 Monmouth 76, No. 11 Niagara 72
Scoring by half: 33–33, 43–39
| Pts: Salnave – 20; Rebs: Quinn – 9 Asts: Salnave & Rutherford – 2 Quinn – 14 pts, 3 blk | Pts: Solomon – 24; Rebs: Prochet – 12; Asts: Hammond – 3 Robb – 4 blk |

Times Union Center
Albany, NY
Attendance: 2,260
Referees: Mike Kitts, Earl Walton, Jeff Anderson

=== Quarterfinals ===
ESPN3

March 8, 2019
7:00 pm

Recap

No. 1 Iona 73, No. 9 Saint Peter's 71
Scoring by half: 38–39, 35–32
| Pts: Agee & Crawford – 26; Rebs: Agee – 6 Asts: Gist – 4 McGill – 18 pts, 2 stl | Pts: Turner – 23; Rebs: Idowu – 9 Asts: Watson – 5 Ndefo – 12 pts, 4 reb, 4 blk |

Times Union Center
Albany, NY
Referees: Mike Kitts, Ron Tyburski, Adam Vandenburgh

ESPN3

March 8, 2019
9:30 pm

Recap

No. 2 Canisius 69, No. 7 Manhattan 65 (OT)
Scoring by half: 25–32, 32–25 Overtime: 12–8
| Pts: Faulkner – 20; Rebs: Faulkner – 8 Asts: Johnson – 6 White – 16 pts | Pts: Williams – 27; Rebs: Greene – 7 Asts: Hinckson & Mack – 3 Hinckson – 5 reb, 5 stl |

Times Union Center
Albany, NY
Attendance: 2,111
Referees: Earl Walton, Brandon Cruz, Edwin Young

ESPN3

March 9, 2019
7:00 pm

Recap

No. 3 Quinnipiac 92, No. 6 Monmouth 98
Scoring by half: 45–50, 47–78
| Pts: Young – 33; Rebs: Young & Marfo – 7 Asts: Kelly – 11; Rigoni – 30 pts, 3 reb | Pts: Salnave & Traore – 19; Rebs: Quinn – 7 Asts: Salnave – 4 Salnave – 6 reb |

Times Union Center
Albany, NY
Referees: Donnie Eppley, Josh White, Andy O'Brien

ESPN3

March 9, 2019
9:30 pm

Recap

No. 4 Rider 81, No. 5 Siena 87
Scoring by half: 29–30, 52–57
| Pts: Marshall – 22; Rebs: Marshall – 8 Asts: Durham – 4 Marshall – 2 blk | Pts: Fisher – 22; Rebs: Degnan – 7 Asts: Pickett – 6 Pickett – 20 pts, 4 blk |

Times Union Center
Albany, NY
Attendance: 5,336
Referees: Larry Scirotto, Robert Riley, Robert Snedden

=== Semifinals ===
ESPN3

March 10, 2019
6:00 pm

Recap

No. 1 Iona 73, No. 5 Siena 57
Scoring by half: 35–22, 38–35
| Pts: Gist – 22; Rebs: Agee – 13; Asts: Gist & McGill – 3 Crawford – 8 reb | Pts: Pickett & Fisher – 15; Rebs: Degnan – 8 Asts: Pickett – 8 Pickett – 7 reb |

Times Union Center
Albany, NY
Referees: Rob Riley, Brandon Cruz, Ron Tyburski

ESPNU

March 10, 2019
8:30 pm

Recap

No. 2 Canisius 59, No. 6 Monmouth 73
Scoring by half: 26–35, 33–38
| Pts: Molson – 17; Rebs: Molson – 7 Asts: Johnson – 5 Johnson – 10 pts, 3 stl | Pts: Hammond – 19; Rebs: Quinn – 10; Asts: Salnave & McClary – 2 Quinn – 14 pts, 2 blk |

Times Union Center
Albany, NY
Attendance: 4,918
Referees: Larry Scirotto, Nathan Farrell, Bill McCarthy

=== Championship ===
ESPN2

March 11, 2019
9:00 pm

Recap

No. 1 Iona 81, No. 6 Monmouth 60
Scoring by half: 36–30, 45–30
| Pts: Gist – 22; Rebs: Agee – 7 Asts: Gist – 4 Agee – 18 pts, Perez 14 pts, 5 stl, 5 reb | Pts: Quinn – 13; Rebs: Traore & Ibiezugbe – 6 Asts: Salnave – 3 Hammond – 8 pts |

Times Union Center
Albany, NY
Attendance: 2,123
Referees: D.J. Carstensen, Larry Scirotto, Rob Riley

== Team and tournament leaders ==
=== Team leaders ===
| Team | Points | | Rebounds | | Assists | | Steals | | Blocks | | Minutes | | W–L |
|---|---|---|---|---|---|---|---|---|---|---|---|---|---|
| Canisius | Molson | 32 | 3 tied | 10 | Johnson | 11 | Molson | 5 | 3 tied | 2 | Johnson | 82 | 1–1 |
| Fairfield | Alvarez | 18 | Kasibabu | 6 | Benning | 3 | Methnani | 2 | Taliaferro | 2 | 3 tied | 40 | 0–1 |
| Iona | Crawford | 59 | Agee | 26 | Gist | 11 | Perez | 8 | Ristanovic | 2 | Crawford | 111 | 3–0 |
| Manhattan | Williams | 37 | Ebube | 11 | Mack | 5 | Hinckson | 5 | 3 tied | 1 | Stewart | 67 | 0–1 |
| Marist | Parker | 22 | Lamb | 6 | Parker | 4 | Dozic | 2 | Herasme | 1 | Funk | 41 | 0–1 |
| Monmouth | Quinn | 53 | Quinn | 29 | Salnave | 11 | Rutherford | 7 | Quinn | 6 | D. Hammond | 117 | 3–1 |
| Niagara | Solomon | 24 | Prochet | 12 | M. Hammond | 3 | King | 3 | Robb | 4 | M. Hammond | 37 | 0–1 |
| Quinnipiac | Young | 30 | Young & Marfo | 7 | Kelly | 11 | Kelly | 2 | Bundu & Marfo | 1 | Young | 40 | 0–1 |
| Rider | Marshall | 22 | Marshall | 8 | Durham | 4 | Scott | 2 | Marshall | 2 | Jordan | 37 | 0–1 |
| Saint Peter's | Turner | 41 | Idowu | 17 | Watson | 8 | 3 tied | 2 | Ndefo | 8 | Turner | 83 | 1–1 |
| Siena | Fisher | 37 | Degnan | 14 | Pickett | 14 | Smitthen | 5 | Pickett | 4 | Pickett | 76 | 1–1 |

== All-championship team ==
2019 MAAC Men's Basketball All-Championship Team
- Jalen Pickett, Siena
- Jalanni White, Canisius
- Deion Hammond, Monmouth
- Diago Quinn, Monmouth
- Tajuan Agee, Iona
- E.J. Crawford, Iona
- ^{MVP} Rickey McGill, Iona

== See also ==
- 2019 MAAC women's basketball tournament
