= 2018–19 Niagara Purple Eagles men's basketball team =

American college basketball season

2018–19 Niagara Purple Eagles men's basketball
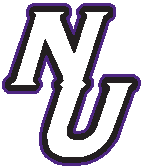
- Conference: Metro Atlantic Athletic Conference
- Record: 13–19 (6–12 MAAC)
- Head coach: Chris Casey (6th season)
- Assistant coaches: Marc Rybczyk; Kareem Brown; Fred Dupree
- Home arena: Gallagher Center

2018–19 MAAC men's basketball standings
	Conf.				Overall
Team	W		L	PCT	W		L	PCT
Iona †	12	–	6	.667	17	–	16	.515
Canisius	11	–	7	.611	15	–	17	.469
Quinnipiac	11	–	7	.611	16	–	15	.516
Rider	11	–	7	.611	16	–	15	.516
Siena	11	–	7	.611	17	–	16	.515
Monmouth	10	–	8	.556	14	–	21	.400
Manhattan	8	–	10	.444	11	–	21	.344
Marist	7	–	11	.389	12	–	19	.387
Saint Peter's	6	–	12	.333	10	–	22	.313
Fairfield	6	–	12	.333	9	–	22	.290
Niagara	6	–	12	.333	13	–	19	.406
† 2019 MAAC tournament winner

The 2018–19 Niagara Purple Eagles men's basketball team represented Niagara University in the 2018–19 NCAA Division I men's basketball season. They played their home games at the Gallagher Center in Lewiston, New York as members of the Metro Atlantic Athletic Conference, and were led by 6th-year head coach Chris Casey. They finished the 2018–19 season 13–19 overall, 6–12 in MAAC play to finish in a three-way tie for ninth place. As the 11th seed in the 2019 MAAC tournament, they were defeated by No. 6 seed Monmouth in the first round 72–76.

On March 11, 2019, head coach Chris Casey was fired. He finished at Niagara with a six-year record of 64–129. On March 28, 2019, Niagara hired Patrick Beilein as their new head coach.

== Previous season ==
The Purple Eagles finished the 2017–18 season 19–14, 12–6 in MAAC play to finish in third place. They lost in the quarterfinals of the MAAC tournament to Fairfield. They were invited to the CollegeInsider.com Tournament, where they lost in the first round to Eastern Michigan.

== Roster ==
2018–19 Niagara Purple Eagles men's basketball team
Players
Coaches

Pos.	#	Name	Height	Weight	Year	Previous school	Hometown
G	0	Chris Barton	6 ft 3 in (1.91 m)	199 lb (90 kg)	Sr	Avondale	Pontiac, MI
G	1	Dominik Fragala	6 ft 0 in (1.83 m)	145 lb (66 kg)	RS Fr	John Champe	Chantilly, VA
G	2	Keleaf Tate	6 ft 2 in (1.88 m)	170 lb (77 kg)	So	Cesar Chavez	Washington, D.C.
G	4	Raheem Solomon	6 ft 2 in (1.88 m)	175 lb (79 kg)	Fr	Sacred Heart	Hartford, CT
G	5	James Towns	5 ft 10 in (1.78 m)	171 lb (78 kg)	Jr	Henry Ford	Detroit, MI
G	10	Marcus Hammond	6 ft 1 in (1.85 m)	160 lb (73 kg)	Fr	Cardozo	Queens, NY
F	11	Marvin Prochet	6 ft 7 in (2.01 m)	207 lb (94 kg)	Sr	Long Island Lutheran	Brooklyn, NY
F	14	Ousmane Diop	6 ft 10 in (2.08 m)	215 lb (98 kg)	Fr	Perkiomen School	Dakar, Senegal
F	15	Greg Kuakumensah	6 ft 6 in (1.98 m)	200 lb (91 kg)	So	Cushing Academy	Worcester, MA
F	21	Kierell Green	6 ft 7 in (2.01 m)	177 lb (80 kg)	Jr	Integrated Design & Electronics Academy	Washington, D.C.
F	24	Greg King	6 ft 7 in (2.01 m)	238 lb (108 kg)	RS Sr	Eastern Kentucky	Atlanta, GA
G	25	Justin Roberts	5 ft 10 in (1.78 m)	187 lb (85 kg)	Jr	Toledo	Lawrence, KS
F	32	Dominic Robb	6 ft 8 in (2.03 m)	226 lb (103 kg)	Sr	Hun School of Princeton	Pittsburgh, PA
G	33	Steven Levnaic	6 ft 2 in (1.88 m)	180 lb (82 kg)	Fr	RISE Centre Academy	Hamilton, ON

Head coach

- Chris Casey (Western Connecticut State)

Assistant coach(es)

- Marc Rybczyk (Central Connecticut State)
- Kareem Brown (St. John's)
- Fred Dupree (Canisius)

Legend

- (C) Team captain
- (S) Suspended
- (I) Ineligible
- (W) Walk-on
- Injured
- Current redshirt

Roster
Last update: December 18, 2018

== Schedule and results ==
Date time, TV	Rank^{#}	Opponent^{#}	Result	Record	Site (attendance) city, state
Exhibition
November 5, 2018*; 7:00 pm		Mercyhurst	W 85–73		Gallagher Center (902); Lewiston, New York
Non-conference regular season
November 12, 2018*; 7:00 pm		St. Bonaventure	W 80–72	1–0	Gallagher Center (2,221); Lewiston, New York
November 14, 2018*; 8:00 pm, ESPN+		at Loyola–Chicago; Fort Myers Tip-Off	L 62–75	1–1	Joseph J. Gentile Arena (2,648); Chicago, Illinois
November 16, 2018*; 9:00 pm		at Wyoming; Fort Myers Tip-Off	W 72–67	2–1	Arena-Auditorium (3,793); Laramie, Wyoming
November 23, 2018*; 4:00 pm		Grambling State; Fort Myers Tip-Off Regional semifinals	L 68–74	2–2	Gallagher Center (910); Lewiston, New York
November 24, 2018*; 7:00 pm		St. Francis Brooklyn; Fort Myers Tip-Off	L 63–75	2–3	Gallagher Center (837); Lewiston, New York
November 30, 2018*; 7:00 pm		at Saint Francis (PA)	L 75–79	2–4	DeGol Arena (992); Loretto, Pennsylvania
December 3, 2018*; 7:00 pm, ACCN Extra		at Pittsburgh	W 71–70	3–4	Petersen Events Center (3,468); Pittsburgh, Pennsylvania
December 9, 2018*; 7:00 pm		New Hampshire	W 71–67	4–4	Gallagher Center (832); Lewiston, New York
December 16, 2018*; 2:00 pm		Cornell	W 77–74	5–4	Gallagher Center (865); Lewiston, New York
December 19, 2018*; 7:30 pm, ESPN3		at Cleveland State	L 60–82	5–5	Wolstein Center (1,185); Cleveland, Ohio
December 22, 2018*; 1:00 pm		at Army	W 78–66	6–5	Christl Arena (798); West Point, New York
December 29, 2018*; 3:00 pm		Norfolk State	W 83–75	7–5	Gallagher Center (898); Lewiston, New York
December 31, 2018*; 7:00 pm		Albany	L 74–79	7–6	Gallagher Center (829); Lewiston, New York
MAAC regular season
January 5, 2019; 7:00 pm		at Manhattan	L 80–90	7–7 (0–1)	Draddy Gymnasium (801); Riverdale, New York
January 7, 2019; 7:00 pm, ESPN3		at Fairfield	L 59–77	7–8 (0–2)	Alumni Hall (1,037); Fairfield, Connecticut
January 11, 2019; 7:00 pm		Iona	W 95–90	8–8 (1–2)	Gallagher Center (896); Lewiston, New York
January 13, 2019; 2:00 pm		Rider	L 84–104	8–9 (1–3)	Gallagher Center (936); Lewiston, New York
January 17, 2019; 7:00 pm, ESPN3		at Siena	L 57–66	8–10 (1–4)	Times Union Center (5,549); Albany, New York
January 19, 2019; 2:00 pm, ESPN3		at Quinnipiac	W 75–72	9–10 (2–4)	People's United Center (1,353); Hamden, Connecticut
January 22, 2019; 7:00 pm		Saint Peter's	L 72–74	9–11 (2–5)	Gallagher Center (1,039); Lewiston, New York
January 26, 2019; 3:00 pm		Monmouth	W 75–48	10–11 (3–5)	Gallagher Center (956); Lewiston, New York
January 30, 2019; 7:00 pm		Canisius; Battle of the Bridge	W 78–70	11–11 (4–5)	Gallagher Center (1,660); Lewiston, New York
February 3, 2019; 2:00 pm		Quinnipiac	L 73–84	11–12 (4–6)	Gallagher Center (998); Lewiston, New York
February 8, 2019; 7:00 pm, ESPN+		at Marist	L 58–79	11–13 (4–7)	McCann Arena (1,131); Poughkeepsie, New York
February 10, 2019; 1:00 pm, ESPN+		at Iona	L 76–79	11–14 (4–8)	Hynes Athletic Center (1,807); New Rochelle, New York
February 15, 2019; 7:00 pm		Manhattan	L 60–64	11–15 (4–9)	Gallagher Center (930); Lewiston, New York
February 17, 2019; 2:00 pm		Fairfield	W 78–73	12–15 (5–9)	Gallagher Center (1,023); Lewiston, New York
February 22, 2019; 7:00 pm, ESPN+		at Rider	L 81–97	12–16 (5–10)	Alumni Gymnasium (1,589); Lawrenceville, New Jersey
February 24, 2019; 2:00 pm		at Saint Peter's	L 60–78	12–17 (5–11)	Yanitelli Center (535); Jersey City, New Jersey
February 27, 2019; 7:30 pm, ESPN3		at Canisius; Battle of the Bridge	W 86–84	13–17 (6–11)	Koessler Athletic Center; Buffalo, New York
March 3, 2019; 2:00 pm		Siena	L 65–72 ^{OT}	13–18 (6–12)	Gallagher Center; Lewiston, New York
MAAC tournament
March 7, 2019; 10:00 pm, ESPN3	(11)	vs. (6) Monmouth; First Round	L 72-76	13-19	Times Union Center; Albany, New York
*Non-conference game. ^{#}Rankings from AP Poll. (#) Tournament seedings in parentheses. All times are in Eastern.
