= 2018–19 Rider Broncs men's basketball team =

American college basketball season

2018–19 Rider Broncs men's basketball
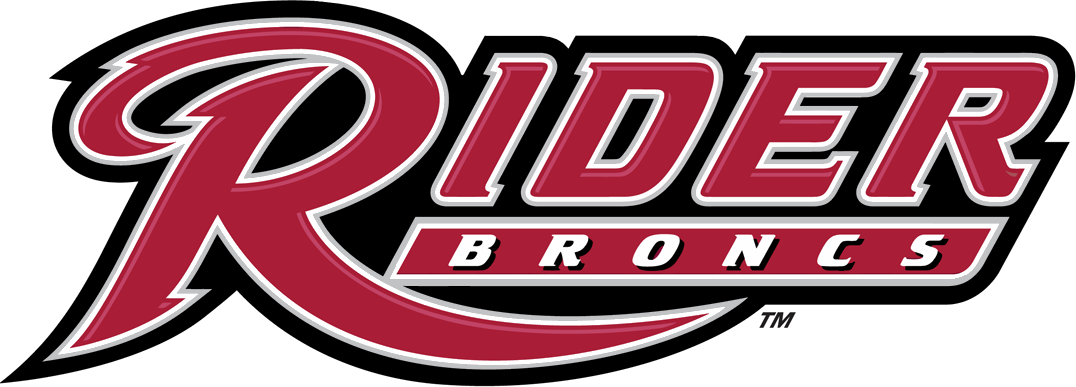
- Conference: Metro Atlantic Athletic Conference
- Record: 16–15 (11–7 MAAC)
- Head coach: Kevin Baggett (7th season)
- Assistant coaches: Dino Presley; Marlon Guild; Ben Luber
- Home arena: Alumni Gymnasium

2018–19 MAAC men's basketball standings
| | Conf. | | | | Overall |
| Team | W | | L | PCT | W | | L | PCT |
|---|---|---|---|---|---|---|---|---|
| Iona † | 12 | – | 6 | .667 | 17 | – | 16 | .515 |
| Canisius | 11 | – | 7 | .611 | 15 | – | 17 | .469 |
| Quinnipiac | 11 | – | 7 | .611 | 16 | – | 15 | .516 |
| Rider | 11 | – | 7 | .611 | 16 | – | 15 | .516 |
| Siena | 11 | – | 7 | .611 | 17 | – | 16 | .515 |
| Monmouth | 10 | – | 8 | .556 | 14 | – | 21 | .400 |
| Manhattan | 8 | – | 10 | .444 | 11 | – | 21 | .344 |
| Marist | 7 | – | 11 | .389 | 12 | – | 19 | .387 |
| Saint Peter's | 6 | – | 12 | .333 | 10 | – | 22 | .313 |
| Fairfield | 6 | – | 12 | .333 | 9 | – | 22 | .290 |
| Niagara | 6 | – | 12 | .333 | 13 | – | 19 | .406 |
† 2019 MAAC tournament winner

The 2018–19 Rider Broncs men's basketball team represented Rider University in the 2018–19 NCAA Division I men's basketball season. They played their home games at the Alumni Gymnasium in Lawrenceville, New Jersey as members of the Metro Atlantic Athletic Conference, and were led by seventh year head coach Kevin Baggett. They finished the 2018–19 season 16–15 overall, 11–7 in MAAC play to finish in a four-way tie for second place. As the 4th seed in the 2019 MAAC tournament, they were defeated by No. 5 seed Siena 81–87 in the quarterfinals.

== Previous season ==
The Broncs finished the 2017–18 season 22–10, 15–3 in MAAC play to finish in a tie for first place with Canisius. After tie breakers, they were the No. 1 seed in the MAAC tournament where they were upset in the quarterfinals by Saint Peter's. As a regular season conference champion, and No. 1 seed in their conference tournament, who failed to win their conference tournament, they received an automatic bid to the National Invitation Tournament where they lost in the first round to Oregon.

== Roster ==
2018–19 Rider Broncs men's basketball team
Players
Coaches

| Pos. | # | Name | Height | Weight | Year | Previous school | Hometown |
|---|---|---|---|---|---|---|---|
| G | 2 | Jordan Allen | 6 ft 4 in (1.93 m) | 195 lb (88 kg) | RS So | Dover | Dover, DE |
| G | 3 | Noah Buono (W) | 6 ft 5 in (1.96 m) | 175 lb (79 kg) | RS Fr | Brick Township | Brick, NJ |
| G | 5 | Tyrei Randall | 6 ft 5 in (1.96 m) | 165 lb (75 kg) | So | St. Thomas More (CT) | Aurora, CO |
| F | 10 | Ajiri Ogemuno-Johnson | 6 ft 8 in (2.03 m) | 204 lb (93 kg) | Fr | Monsignor Bonner | Lansdowne, PA |
| F | 11 | Devine Eke | 6 ft 8 in (2.03 m) | 210 lb (95 kg) | RS Jr | Maine | Plainfield, NJ |
| G | 12 | Anthony Durham | 6 ft 3 in (1.91 m) | 200 lb (91 kg) | GS | Abington | Philadelphia, PA |
| F | 13 | Frederick Scott | 6 ft 8 in (2.03 m) | 223 lb (101 kg) | RS So | DePaul | Munster, IN |
| G/F | 14 | Dimencio Vaughn | 6 ft 5 in (1.96 m) | 210 lb (95 kg) | RS So | The Masters School | New York, NY |
| F | 15 | Karamoko Cisse | 6 ft 7 in (2.01 m) | 225 lb (102 kg) | Sr | Gillette College | Denver, CO |
| C | 20 | Tyere Marshall | 6 ft 9 in (2.06 m) | 240 lb (109 kg) | Jr | Martin Luther King | Philadelphia, PA |
| F | 21 | Tyrel Bladen | 6 ft 10 in (2.08 m) | 217 lb (98 kg) | Fr | Coatesville | Coatesville, PA |
| G | 22 | Kimar Williams | 6 ft 1 in (1.85 m) | 185 lb (84 kg) | RS Jr | FIU | Philadelphia, PA |
| G | 23 | Stevie Jordan | 6 ft 0 in (1.83 m) | 170 lb (77 kg) | Jr | Conwell–Egan | Bensalem, PA |
| G | 24 | Ryan O'Leary | 6 ft 5 in (1.96 m) | 185 lb (84 kg) | RS Fr | Sayreville | Sayreville, NJ |
| G | 32 | Ahmad Gilbert | 6 ft 7 in (2.01 m) | 215 lb (98 kg) | RS Jr | Minnesota | Philadelphia, PA |

Head coach

- Kevin Baggett (Saint Joseph's)

Assistant coach(es)

- Dino Presley (Kutztown)
- Marlon Guild (Hartford)
- Ben Luber (Penn State)

Legend

- (C) Team captain
- (S) Suspended
- (I) Ineligible
- (W) Walk-on
- Injured
- Current redshirt

Roster
Last update: December 19, 2018

== Schedule and results ==
| Date time, TV | Rank^{#} | Opponent^{#} | Result | Record | Site (attendance) city, state |
Exhibition
| November 3, 2018*; 4:00 pm | | West Chester | W 87–81 | | Alumni Gymnasium (1,500); Lawrenceville, New Jersey |
Non-conference regular season
| November 6, 2018*; 6:30 pm, ESPN3 | | at UCF | L 70–84 | 0–1 | CFE Arena (4,870); Orlando, Florida |
| November 19, 2018*; 7:00 pm, ESPN3 | | Coppin State | W 87–67 | 1–1 | Alumni Gymnasium (1,545); Lawrenceville, New Jersey |
| November 24, 2018*; 2:00 pm, NEC Front Row | | at Wagner | W 89–65 | 2–1 | Spiro Sports Center (1,147); Staten Island, New York |
| November 28, 2018*; 6:30 pm, ATTSNPT | | at West Virginia | L 78–92 | 2–2 | WVU Coliseum (9,124); Morgantown, West Virginia |
| December 8, 2018*; 4:00 pm | | at Hofstra | L 73–89 | 2–3 | Mack Sports Complex (1,676); Hempstead, New York |
| December 12, 2018*; 7:00 pm, ESPN3 | | Norfolk State | W 81–71 | 3–3 | Alumni Gymnasium (1,587); Lawrenceville, New Jersey |
| December 15, 2018*; 3:00 pm, ESPN3 | | Robert Morris | W 69–50 | 4–3 | Alumni Gymnasium (1,425); Lawrenceville, New Jersey |
| December 17, 2018*; 10:00 pm, P12N | | at Washington State; Las Vegas Classic campus game | L 80–94 | 4–4 | Beasley Coliseum (1,673); Pullman, Washington |
| December 19, 2018*; 8:00 pm, ESPN+ | | at Drake; Las Vegas Classic campus game | L 58–76 | 4–5 | Knapp Center (2,358); Des Moines, Iowa |
| December 22, 2018*; 4:30 pm | | vs. Northern Colorado; Las Vegas Classic Visitors semifinals | W 74–67 | 5–5 | Orleans Arena; Paradise, Nevada |
| December 23, 2018*; 4:30 pm | | vs. Cal State Northridge; Las Vegas Classic Visitors championship game | L 80–81 | 5–6 | Orleans Arena (2,152); Paradise, Nevada |
| December 30, 2018*; 2:00 pm, ESPN+ | | at VCU | L 79–90 | 5–7 | Siegel Center (7,637); Richmond, Virginia |
MAAC regular season
| January 3, 2019; 7:00 pm, ESPN+ | | at Fairfield | W 83–82 | 6–7 (1–0) | Alumni Hall (1,021); Fairfield, Connecticut |
| January 5, 2019; 7:00 pm, ESPN3 | | Quinnipiac | W 72–67 | 7–7 (2–0) | Alumni Gymnasium (1,350); Lawrenceville, New Jersey |
| January 11, 2019; 7:00 pm, ESPN+ | | at Canisius | W 82–73 | 8–7 (3–0) | Koessler Athletic Center (873); Buffalo, New York |
| January 13, 2019; 2:00 pm | | at Niagara | W 104–84 | 9–7 (4–0) | Gallagher Center (936); Lewiston, New York |
| January 19, 2019; 7:00 pm, ESPN3 | | Manhattan | W 60–47 | 10–7 (5–0) | Alumni Gymnasium (1,219); Lawrenceville, New Jersey |
| January 25, 2019; 7:00 pm, ESPNU | | at Iona | L 71–77 | 10–8 (5–1) | Hynes Athletic Center (1,652); New Rochelle, New York |
| January 27, 2019; 2:00 pm, ESPN3 | | Marist | W 86–85 | 11–8 (6–1) | Alumni Gymnasium (1,502); Lawrenceville, New Jersey |
| January 31, 2019; 7:00 pm, ESPN+ | | Saint Peter's | W 59–51 | 12–8 (7–1) | Alumni Gymnasium (1,560); Lawrenceville, New Jersey |
| February 2, 2019; 7:00 pm, ESPN+ | | at Monmouth | L 71–75 | 12–9 (7–2) | OceanFirst Bank Center (2,386); West Long Branch, New Jersey |
| February 5, 2019; 7:00 pm, ESPN+ | | at Manhattan | L 66–73 | 12–10 (7–3) | Draddy Gymnasium (937); Bronx, New York |
| February 8, 2019; 7:00 pm, ESPNU | | Canisius | L 80–81 | 12–11 (7–4) | Alumni Gymnasium (1,650); Lawrenceville, New Jersey |
| February 10, 2019; 2:00 pm, ESPN+ | | Siena | L 57–59 | 12–12 (7–5) | Alumni Gymnasium (1,559); Lawrenceville, New Jersey |
| February 12, 2019; 7:00 pm, ESPN+ | | at Quinnipiac | L 88–98 ^{OT} | 12–13 (7–6) | People's United Center (311); Hamden, Connecticut |
| February 15, 2019; 7:00 pm, ESPN3 | | Monmouth | W 81–72 | 13–13 (8–6) | Alumni Gymnasium (1,650); Lawrenceville, New Jersey |
| February 17, 2019; 2:00 pm | | at Saint Peter's | W 71–65 | 14–13 (9–6) | Yanitelli Center (514); Jersey City, New Jersey |
| February 22, 2019; 7:00 pm, ESPN+ | | Niagara | W 97–81 | 15–13 (10–6) | Alumni Gymnasium (1,589); Lawrenceville, New Jersey |
| March 1, 2019; 7:00 pm, ESPN+ | | Iona | L 79–86 | 15–14 (10–7) | Alumni Gymnasium (1,650); Lawrenceville, New Jersey |
| March 3, 2019; 2:00 pm, ESPN+ | | at Marist | W 75–64 | 16–14 (11–7) | McCann Arena (1,619); Poughkeepsie, New York |
MAAC tournament
| March 9, 2019; 9:30 pm, ESPN3 | (4) | at (5) Siena; Quarterfinals | L 81–87 | 16–15 | Times Union Center; Albany, New York |
*Non-conference game. ^{#}Rankings from AP Poll. (#) Tournament seedings in parentheses. All times are in Eastern.
