= 2018–19 Quinnipiac Bobcats men's basketball team =

American college basketball season

2018–19 Quinnipiac Bobcats men's basketball
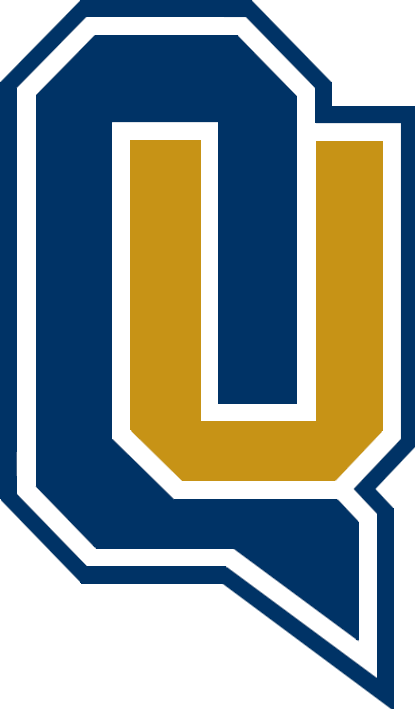

CIT, First round
- Conference: Metro Atlantic Athletic Conference
- Record: 16–15 (11–7 MAAC)
- Head coach: Baker Dunleavy (2nd season)
- Assistant coaches: Tom Pecora; Shaun Morris; Dalip Bhatia
- Home arena: People's United Center

2018–19 MAAC men's basketball standings
| | Conf. | | | | Overall |
| Team | W | | L | PCT | W | | L | PCT |
|---|---|---|---|---|---|---|---|---|
| Iona † | 12 | – | 6 | .667 | 17 | – | 16 | .515 |
| Canisius | 11 | – | 7 | .611 | 15 | – | 17 | .469 |
| Quinnipiac | 11 | – | 7 | .611 | 16 | – | 15 | .516 |
| Rider | 11 | – | 7 | .611 | 16 | – | 15 | .516 |
| Siena | 11 | – | 7 | .611 | 17 | – | 16 | .515 |
| Monmouth | 10 | – | 8 | .556 | 14 | – | 21 | .400 |
| Manhattan | 8 | – | 10 | .444 | 11 | – | 21 | .344 |
| Marist | 7 | – | 11 | .389 | 12 | – | 19 | .387 |
| Saint Peter's | 6 | – | 12 | .333 | 10 | – | 22 | .313 |
| Fairfield | 6 | – | 12 | .333 | 9 | – | 22 | .290 |
| Niagara | 6 | – | 12 | .333 | 13 | – | 19 | .406 |
† 2019 MAAC tournament winner

The 2018–19 Quinnipiac Bobcats men's basketball team represented Quinnipiac University in the 2018–19 NCAA Division I men's basketball season. They played their home games at People's United Center in Hamden, Connecticut as members of the Metro Atlantic Athletic Conference, and were led by 2nd-year head coach Baker Dunleavy. They finished the 2018–19 season 16–15 overall, 11–7 in MAAC play to finish in a four-way tie for second place. As the No. 3 seed in the 2019 MAAC tournament, they were defeated by No. 6 seed Monmouth 92–98 in the quarterfinals. On March 13, 2019, they accepted an invitation to the CIT tournament, where they played NJIT in the opening round on March 18, 2019, losing 81–92.

== Previous season ==
The Bobcats finished the 2017–18 season 12–21, 7–11 in MAAC play to finish in a tie for seventh place. As the No. 7 seed at the MAAC tournament, they defeated No. 10 seed Siena and upset No. 2 seed Canisius to advance to the semifinals, where they lost to No. 6 seed Fairfield.

== Roster ==
2018–19 Quinnipiac Bobcats men's basketball team
Players
Coaches

| Pos. | # | Name | Height | Weight | Year | Previous school | Hometown |
|---|---|---|---|---|---|---|---|
| G | 0 | Aaron Robinson | 6 ft 6 in (1.98 m) | 215 lb (98 kg) | Sr | Putnam Science Academy | Takoma Park, MD |
| G | 1 | Cameron Young | 6 ft 6 in (1.98 m) | 205 lb (93 kg) | GS | Arizona Western College | Los Angeles, CA |
| G | 2 | Matt Balanc | 6 ft 3 in (1.91 m) | 175 lb (79 kg) | Fr | Springbrook | Silver Spring, MD |
| G | 3 | Savion Lewis | 6 ft 1 in (1.85 m) | 160 lb (73 kg) | Fr | Half Hollow Hills East | Dix Hills, NY |
| G | 5 | Tyrese Williams | 6 ft 3 in (1.91 m) | 185 lb (84 kg) | Fr | Cardinal Hayes | Beacon, NY |
| G | 10 | Tyree Pickron | 6 ft 3 in (1.91 m) | 180 lb (82 kg) | Fr | Archbishop Wood Catholic | Philadelphia, PA |
| G | 14 | Andrew Robinson | 6 ft 6 in (1.98 m) | 215 lb (98 kg) | Sr | Putnam Science Academy | Takoma Park, MD |
| G | 15 | Travis Atson | 6 ft 5 in (1.96 m) | 205 lb (93 kg) | RS Jr | Tulsa | Brooklyn, NY |
| F | 21 | Nathan Davis | 6 ft 7 in (2.01 m) | 200 lb (91 kg) | RS So | New Hampton School | Denver, CO |
| G | 22 | Rich Kelly | 6 ft 1 in (1.85 m) | 175 lb (79 kg) | So | Cheshire Academy | Shelton, CT |
| G | 23 | Kyle Atkins | 6 ft 0 in (1.83 m) | 160 lb (73 kg) | Fr | Archbishop Stepinac | White Plains, NY |
| F | 25 | Jacob Rigoni | 6 ft 6 in (1.98 m) | 190 lb (86 kg) | So | Mercedes College | Adelaide, Australia |
| G | 32 | Jack Higgins | 6 ft 1 in (1.85 m) | 170 lb (77 kg) | Fr | Rumson-Fair Haven | Rumson, NJ |
| F | 34 | Abdulai Bundu | 6 ft 7 in (2.01 m) | 215 lb (98 kg) | Sr | Largo | Upper Marlboro, MD |
| F | 45 | Kevin Marfo | 6 ft 8 in (2.03 m) | 245 lb (111 kg) | RS Jr | George Washington | Bergenfield, NJ |

Head coach

- Baker Dunleavy (Villanova)

Assistant coach(es)

- Tom Pecora (Adelphi)
- Shaun Morris (Lycoming)
- Anthony Goins (St. John's)

Legend

- (C) Team captain
- (S) Suspended
- (I) Ineligible
- (W) Walk-on
- Injured
- Current redshirt

Roster
Last update: December 21, 2018

== Schedule and results ==
| Date time, TV | Rank^{#} | Opponent^{#} | Result | Record | Site (attendance) city, state |
Non-conference regular season
| November 10, 2018*; 8:00 pm, FS2 | | at No. 9 Villanova | L 53–86 | 0–1 | Finneran Pavilion (10,216); Villanova, Pennsylvania |
| November 15, 2018*; 7:00 pm, ESPN+ | | Hartford | L 54–68 | 0–2 | People's United Center (543); Hamden, Connecticut |
| November 20, 2018*; 7:00 pm, Americaeast.tv | | at New Hampshire | W 69–63 | 1–2 | Lundholm Gym (237); Durham, New Hampshire |
| November 25, 2018*; 2:00 pm, ESPN+ | | Maine | W 58–50 | 2–2 | People's United Center (1,012); Hamden, Connecticut |
| November 28, 2018*; 7:00 pm, NESN/ESPN+ | | at UMass | L 62–69 | 2–3 | William D. Mullins Memorial Center (2,478); Amherst, Massachusetts |
| December 1, 2018*; 7:00 pm, Americaeast.tv | | at Stony Brook | L 61–71 | 2–4 | Island Federal Credit Union Arena (3,123); Stony Brook, New York |
| December 5, 2018*; 7:00 pm, ESPN+ | | at Dartmouth | W 64–59 | 3–4 | Leede Arena (437); Hanover, New Hampshire |
| December 8, 2018*; 2:00 pm, ESPN3 | | Lafayette | W 88–77 | 4–4 | People's United Center (2,008); Hamden, Connecticut |
| December 16, 2018*; 6:00 pm | | vs. Drexel; Air Force Reserve Holiday Showcase | L 83–92 | 4–5 | Mohegan Sun Arena (5,812); Uncasville, Connecticut |
| December 19, 2018*; 8:00 pm, ESPN+ | | Bethune–Cookman | W 87–63 | 5–5 | People's United Center (548); Hamden, Connecticut |
| December 22, 2018*; 2:00 pm, ESPN3 | | Stony Brook | L 73–76 | 5–6 | People's United Center (828); Hamden, Connecticut |
MAAC regular season
| January 3, 2019; 7:00 pm, Jasper Sports Network | | at Manhattan | W 63–59 | 6–6 (1–0) | Draddy Gymnasium (612); Bronx, New York |
| January 5, 2019; 7:00 pm, ESPN3 | | at Rider | L 67–72 | 6–7 (1–1) | Alumni Gymnasium (1,350); Lawrenceville, New Jersey |
| January 10, 2019; 7:00 pm, ESPN3 | | Monmouth | W 89–83 ^{2OT} | 7–7 (2–1) | People's United Center (916); Hamden, Connecticut |
| January 13, 2019; 2:00 pm, ESPN3 | | Fairfield | W 80–78 | 8–7 (3–1) | People's United Center (1,547); Hamden, Connecticut |
| January 17, 2019; 7:00 pm, ESPN3 | | Canisius | L 63–65 | 8–8 (3–2) | People's United Center (792); Hamden, Connecticut |
| January 19, 2019; 2:00 pm, ESPN3 | | Niagara | L 72–75 | 8–9 (3–3) | People's United Center (1,353); Hamden, Connecticut |
| January 25, 2019; 7:00 pm, ESPN3 | | at Marist | W 92–78 | 9–9 (4–3) | McCann Arena (1,309); Poughkeepsie, New York |
| January 27, 2019; 2:00 pm, ESPN+ | | Saint Peter's | W 77–58 | 10–9 (5–3) | People's United Center (1,324); Hamden, Connecticut |
| February 1, 2019; 7:00 pm, ESPN3 | | at Canisius | L 70–75 | 10–10 (5–4) | Koessler Athletic Center (802); Buffalo, New York |
| February 3, 2019; 2:00 pm, Niagara Sports Network | | at Niagara | W 84–73 | 11–10 (6–4) | Gallagher Center (998); Lewiston, New York |
| February 8, 2019; 7:00 pm, ESPN+ | | at Iona | W 66–65 | 12–10 (7–4) | Hynes Athletic Center (1,532); New Rochelle, New York |
| February 12, 2019; 7:00 pm, ESPN+ | | Rider | W 98–88 ^{OT} | 13–10 (8–4) | People's United Center (311); Hamden, Connecticut |
| February 15, 2019; 8:00 pm, ESPN+ | | Marist | L 61–63 | 13–11 (8–5) | People's United Center (1,978); Hamden, Connecticut |
| February 17, 2019; 2:00 pm, ESPN+ | | at Siena | W 107–100 ^{3OT} | 14–11 (9–5) | Times Union Center (7,146); Albany, New York |
| February 19, 2019; 7:00 pm, ESPN3 | | Iona | L 77–81 | 14–12 (9–6) | People's United Center (1,585); Hamden, Connecticut |
| February 24, 2019; 2:00 pm, ESPN+ | | at Monmouth | W 68–56 | 15–12 (10–6) | OceanFirst Bank Center (2,586); West Long Branch, New Jersey |
| March 1, 2019; 7:00 pm, Peacocks All-Access | | at Saint Peter's | W 77–60 | 16–12 (11–6) | Yanitelli Center; Jersey City, New Jersey |
| March 3, 2019; 2:00 pm, ESPN+ | | Manhattan | L 58–62 | 16–13 (11–7) | People's United Center; Hamden, Connecticut |
MAAC tournament
| March 9, 2019; 7:00 pm, ESPN3 | (3) | vs. (6) Monmouth; Quarterfinals | L 92–98 | 16–14 | Times Union Center; Albany, New York |
CollegeInsider.com Postseason tournament
| March 18, 2019*; 7:00 pm | | at NJIT; First round | L 81–92 | 16–15 | Wellness and Events Center (777); Newark, NJ |
*Non-conference game. ^{#}Rankings from AP Poll. (#) Tournament seedings in parentheses. All times are in Eastern.
