= 2018–19 Canisius Golden Griffins men's basketball team =

American college basketball season

2018–19 Canisius Golden Griffins men's basketball
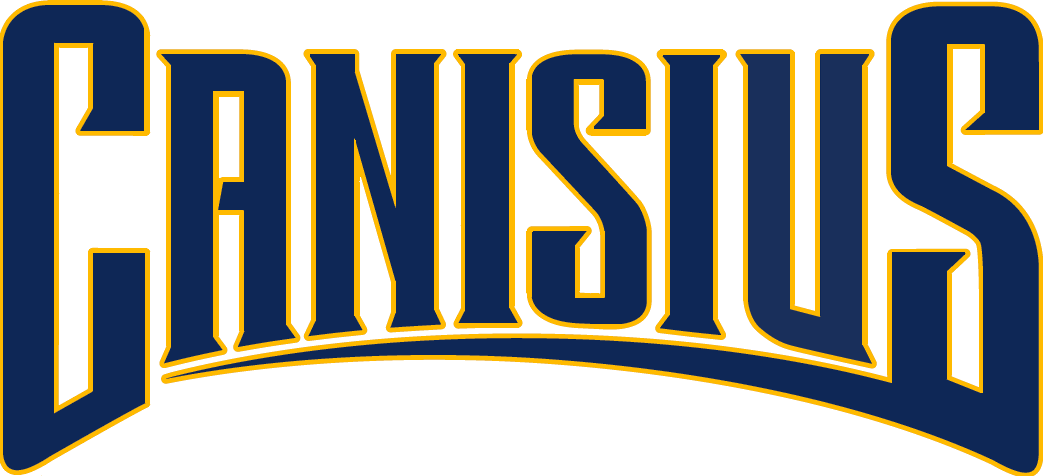
- Conference: Metro Atlantic Athletic Conference
- Record: 15–17 (11–7 MAAC)
- Head coach: Reggie Witherspoon (3rd season)
- Assistant coaches: Chris Hawkins; Eddie Shannon; Thurman Schaetzle
- Home arena: Koessler Athletic Center

2018–19 MAAC men's basketball standings
	Conf.				Overall
Team	W		L	PCT	W		L	PCT
Iona †	12	–	6	.667	17	–	16	.515
Canisius	11	–	7	.611	15	–	17	.469
Quinnipiac	11	–	7	.611	16	–	15	.516
Rider	11	–	7	.611	16	–	15	.516
Siena	11	–	7	.611	17	–	16	.515
Monmouth	10	–	8	.556	14	–	21	.400
Manhattan	8	–	10	.444	11	–	21	.344
Marist	7	–	11	.389	12	–	19	.387
Saint Peter's	6	–	12	.333	10	–	22	.313
Fairfield	6	–	12	.333	9	–	22	.290
Niagara	6	–	12	.333	13	–	19	.406
† 2019 MAAC tournament winner

The 2018–19 Canisius Golden Griffins men's basketball team represented Canisius College in the 2018–19 NCAA Division I men's basketball season. They were led by third-year head coach Reggie Witherspoon and played their home games at the Koessler Athletic Center in Buffalo, New York as members of the Metro Atlantic Athletic Conference (MAAC). They finished the season 15–17 overall, 11–7 in MAAC play, to finish in a four-way tie for second place. As the No. 2 seed in the 2019 MAAC tournament, they defeated No. 7 seed Manhattan in the quarterfinals before falling to No. 6 seed Monmouth 59–73 in the semifinals.

== Previous season ==
The Golden Griffins finished the 2017–18 season 21–11, 15–3 in MAAC play, to finish in a share for the MAAC regular-season title with Rider. It was their first conference regular-season title since 1994. As the No. 2 seed at the MAAC tournament, they were upset by in the quarterfinals by No. 7 seed Quinnipiac. They were invited to the College Basketball Invitational where they lost in the first round to Jacksonville State.

== Roster ==
2018–19 Canisius Golden Griffins men's basketball team
Players
Coaches

Pos.	#	Name	Height	Weight	Year	Previous school	Hometown
G	1	Malik Johnson	5 ft 10 in (1.78 m)	155 lb (70 kg)	Jr	Blue Ridge School	Richmond, VA
G	3	Jordan Henderson	6 ft 4 in (1.93 m)	180 lb (82 kg)	Fr	Indiana Elite Prep	Cincinnati, OH
F	4	Jalanni White	6 ft 7 in (2.01 m)	185 lb (84 kg)	So	Notre Dame	New Haven, CT
G	5	Sam Rautins	6 ft 3 in (1.91 m)	185 lb (84 kg)	Fr	Athlete Institute	Syracuse, NY
G	10	Jonathan Sanks	6 ft 4 in (1.93 m)	205 lb (93 kg)	Sr	Spartanburg Methodist College	Warner Robins, GA
F	11	Marcale Lotts	6 ft 8 in (2.03 m)	230 lb (104 kg)	Sr	Jacksonville College	New Orleans, LA
G	13	Isaiah Reese (S)	6 ft 5 in (1.96 m)	185 lb (84 kg)	Jr	DME Academy	Miami, FL
G	15	Takal Molson	6 ft 5 in (1.96 m)	205 lb (93 kg)	So	TAAG Academy	Buffalo, NY
G	20	Gianni Ford	6 ft 2 in (1.88 m)	175 lb (79 kg)	Jr	Blinn College	Brooklyn, NY
F	21	Scott Hitchon	6 ft 8 in (2.03 m)	215 lb (98 kg)	So	Thornlea Secondary School	Whitby, ON
F	22	Jibreel Faulkner	6 ft 8 in (2.03 m)	200 lb (91 kg)	Sr	San Jacinto College	Washington, D.C.
F	23	Dantai St. Louis	6 ft 8 in (2.03 m)	235 lb (107 kg)	Jr	Orangeville Prep	Brampton, ON
C	24	Ivan Hadžic	6 ft 9 in (2.06 m)	240 lb (109 kg)	Fr	Southwest Christian (AR)	Šabac, Serbia
G	25	Shaquille Evans	6 ft 5 in (1.96 m)	218 lb (99 kg)	Sr	Atlanta Metro State	Nassau, Bahamas

Head coach

- Reggie Witherspoon (Wheeling)

Assistant coach(es)

- Chris Hawkins (Radford)
- Eddie Shannon (Florida)
- Thurman Schaetzle (Canisius)

Legend

- (C) Team captain
- (S) Suspended
- (I) Ineligible
- (W) Walk-on
- Injured
- Current redshirt

Roster
Last update: October 28, 2024

== Schedule and results ==
Date time, TV	Rank^{#}	Opponent^{#}	Result	Record	Site (attendance) city, state
Non-conference regular season
November 13, 2018*; 7:00 p.m., Patriot League Network		at Bucknell	W 82–73	1–0	Sojka Pavilion (2,237); Lewisburg, PA
November 17, 2018*; 3:30 p.m., ESPN3		Albany	L 66–75	1–1	Koessler Athletic Center (1,540); Buffalo, NY
November 19, 2018*; 7:00 p.m., ACCN Extra		at No. 14 Florida State; AdvoCare Invitational campus game	L 61–93	1–2	Donald L. Tucker Center (7,457); Tallahassee, FL
November 22, 2018*; 1:30 p.m., ESPN2		vs. Villanova; AdvoCare Invitational quarterfinals	L 56–83	1–3	HP Field House (2,964); Lake Buena Vista, FL
November 23, 2018*; 1:30 p.m., ESPN3		vs. Memphis; AdvoCare Invitational	L 63–71	1–4	HP Field House (2,672); Lake Buena Vista, FL
November 25, 2018*; 10:30 a.m., ESPNU		vs. UAB; AdvoCare Invitational	L 58–68	1–5	HP Field House (3,127); Lake Buena Vista, FL
November 28, 2018*; 7:00 p.m., ESPN+		at St. Bonaventure	L 55–70	1–6	Reilly Center (3,685); Olean, NY
December 5, 2018*; 7:00 p.m., ESPN3		Robert Morris	W 68–62	2–6	Koessler Athletic Center (884); Buffalo, NY
December 16, 2018*; 2:00 p.m., Phoenix All-Access		at Elon	W 92–91	3–6	Schar Center (1,497); Elon, NC
December 20, 2018*; 2:00 p.m., Patriot League Network		at Holy Cross	L 63–65	3–7	Hart Center (681); Worcester, MA
December 29, 2018*; 2:00 p.m., ESPN+		No. 21 Buffalo	L 72–87	3–8	Koessler Athletic Center (2,196); Buffalo, NY
MAAC regular season
January 3, 2019; 7:00 p.m., ESPN+		at Marist	W 75–72	4–8 (1–0)	McCann Arena (1022); Poughkeepsie, NY
January 5, 2019; 7:00 p.m., ESPN3		at Siena	W 70–66	5–8 (2–0)	Times Union Center (6,432); Albany, NY
January 8, 2019*; 7:00 p.m., ESPN+		Brown	L 90–97	5–9	Koessler Athletic Center (801); Buffalo, NY
January 11, 2019; 7:00 p.m., ESPN+		Rider	L 73–82	5–10 (2–1)	Koessler Athletic Center (873); Buffalo, NY
January 13, 2019; 2:00 p.m., ESPN3		Iona	L 70–88	5–11 (2–2)	Koessler Athletic Center (1,086); Buffalo, NY
January 17, 2019; 7:00 p.m., ESPN3		at Quinnipiac	W 65–63	6–11 (3–2)	People's United Center (792); Hamden, CT
January 19, 2019; 1:00 p.m., ESPN3		at Fairfield	W 73–69	7–11 (4–2)	Alumni Hall (1,281); Fairfield, CT
January 24, 2019; 2:00 p.m., ESPN+		Monmouth	W 80–66	8–11 (5–2)	Koessler Athletic Center (1,221); Buffalo, NY
January 30, 2019; 7:00 p.m., MAAC.TV		at Niagara; Battle of the Bridge	L 70–78	8–12 (5–3)	Gallagher Center (1,660); Lewiston, NY
February 1, 2019; 7:00 p.m., ESPN3		Quinnipiac	W 75–70	9–12 (6–3)	Koessler Athletic Center (802); Buffalo, NY
February 4, 2019; 7:00 p.m., ESPN3		Marist	L 71–78 ^{OT}	9–13 (6–4)	Koessler Athletic Center (943); Buffalo, NY
February 8, 2019; 7:00 p.m., ESPNU		at Rider	W 81–80	10–13 (7–4)	Alumni Gymnasium (1,650); Lawrenceville, NJ
February 10, 2019; 1:00 p.m., MAAC.TV		at Saint Peter's	W 64–60	11–13 (8–4)	Yanitelli Center (595); Jersey City, NJ
February 15, 2019; 7:00 p.m., ESPN+		Fairfield	W 72–68	12–13 (9–4)	Koessler Athletic Center (1,039); Buffalo, NY
February 17, 2019; 2:00 p.m., ESPN+		Manhattan	L 65–70	12–14 (9–5)	Koessler Athletic Center (1,058); Buffalo, NY
February 22, 2019; 7:00 p.m., ESPNU		at Monmouth	W 60–59	13–14 (10–5)	OceanFirst Bank Center (2,625); West Long Branch, NJ
February 24, 2019; 1:00 p.m., ESPN+		at Iona	L 80–87	13–15 (10–6)	Hynes Athletic Center (2,288); New Rochelle, NY
February 27, 2019; 7:30 p.m., ESPN3		Niagara; Battle of the Bridge	L 84–86	13–16 (10–7)	Koessler Athletic Center; Buffalo, NY
March 1, 2019; 9:00 p.m., ESPNU		Siena	W 68–62	14–16 (11–7)	Koessler Athletic Center; Buffalo, NY
MAAC tournament
March 8, 2019; 9:30 p.m., ESPN3	(2)	vs. (7) Manhattan; Quarterfinals	W 69–65 ^{OT}	15-16	Times Union Center; Albany, NY
March 10, 2019; 8:30 p.m., ESPNU	(2)	vs. (6) Monmouth; Semifinals	L 59–73	15–17	Times Union Center (4,918); Albany, NY
*Non-conference game. ^{#}Rankings from AP poll. (#) Tournament seedings in parentheses. All times are in Eastern.
