= Tim Cluess =

American basketball coach (born 1959)

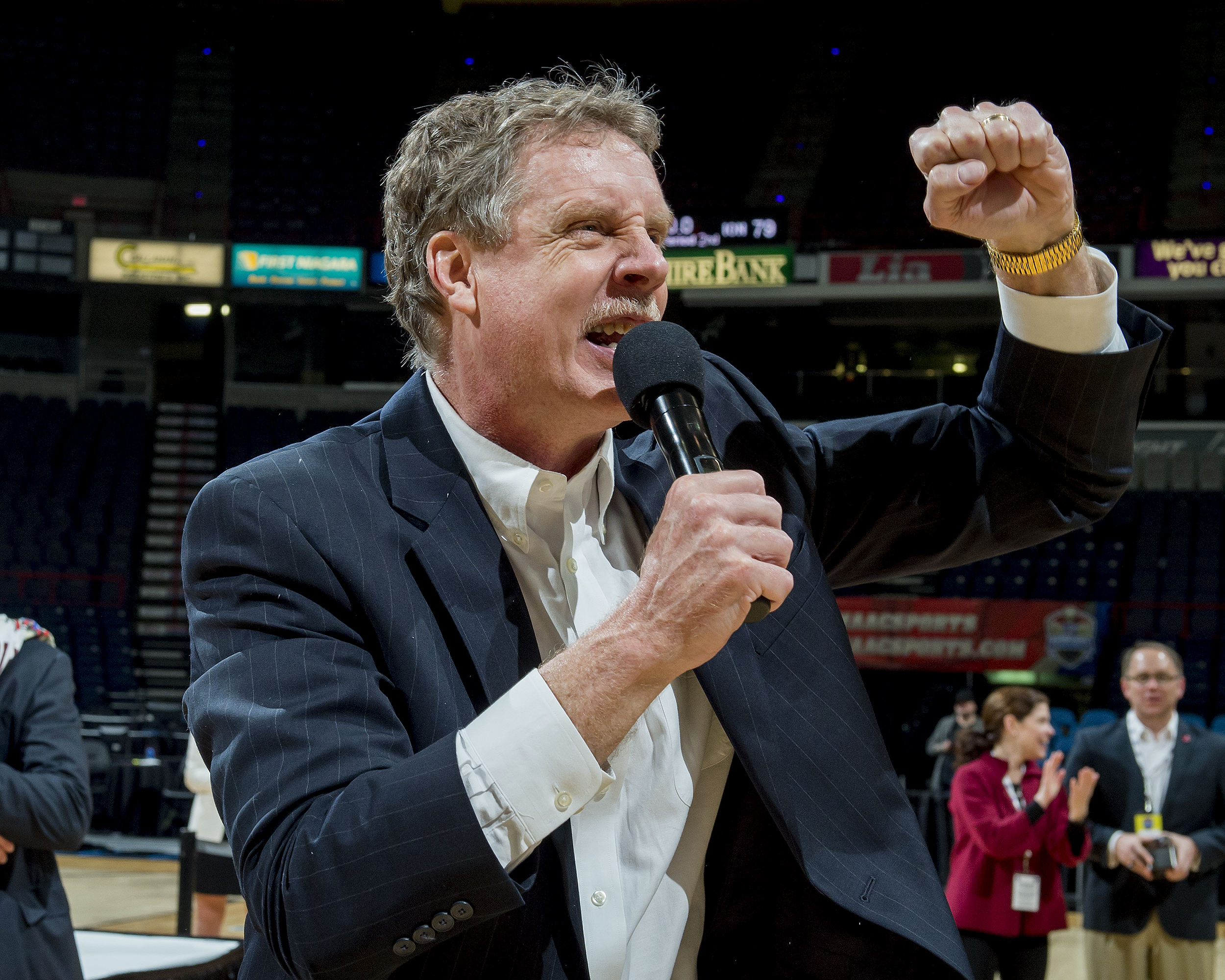

Biographical details
- Born: March 9, 1959 (age 67); Queens, New York, U.S.

Playing career
- 1979–1981: St. John's
- 1982–1983: Hofstra
- Position: Guard

Coaching career (HC unless noted)
- 1991–2005: Saint Mary's HS
- 2005–2006: Suffolk CC
- 2006–2010: LIU Post
- 2010–2019: Iona

Head coaching record
- Overall: 297–131 (college); 22–10 (junior college); 265–78 (high school)

Accomplishments and honors

Championships
- 3× ECC regular season champion (2008–2010); 2× ECC Tournament champion (2008, 2009); 4× MAAC regular season champion (2012, 2014, 2015, 2019); 5× MAAC tournament (2013, 2016–2019)

Awards
- 2× MAAC Coach of the Year (2014, 2019)

Timothy Michael Cluess (born March 9, 1959) is an American college basketball coach who most recently was the head men's basketball coach at Iona College. He is also a former head coach of Long Island University–C.W. Post.

== College playing career ==
Born in Queens, New York, Cluess played college basketball at St. John's (1979–81) and Hofstra (1982–83).

== Professional playing career ==
Cluess played professionally in Europe and Australia.

== Coaching career ==
=== High school ===
Cluess was the head coach of Saint Mary's High School in Manhasset, New York for 14 seasons (1991–2005). Cluess's Gaels won four Class A New York State Catholic High School Athletic Association (NYSCHSAA) championships and two New York State Federation of Secondary Schools Athletic Associations (NYSFSSA) championships. However, St. Mary's played in the Class A Division, and failed to advance past the New York City representative of the Class AA Division each time they attempted to advance for the right to play in the New York State Class AA Federation Tournament.

In 2004–05, Saint Mary's posted a 25–1 overall record. The lone loss came against a New York City team, Xaverian, from the class AA Division as St. Mary's once again failed to advance past New York City in the Class AA Division.

=== College ===
Cluess’ first college coaching job was the 2005–06 Suffolk County Community College team that finished with a regular season record of 20–9. They appeared in their first NJCAA Division III tournament that year, winning their first two games before being eliminated in their third game and finishing the season at 22–10.

After one year at the junior college level, Cluess became the head coach for the Long Island University C.W. Post Campus Pioneers. He led the team to three straight first-place finishes in the East Coast Conference, including two conference tournament titles in 2007–08 and 2008–09. In four seasons at LIU-Post, Cluess led the team to two NCAA Division II men's basketball tournaments in 2008 and 2009. The 2008–09 squad finished the regular season with a record of 24–0, in route to an NCAA Division II Elite Eight tournament appearance and a 30–1 final record.

In April 2010 Cluess replaced Kevin Willard as the head men's basketball coach at Iona College. Cluess' record in nine seasons at Iona was 199–108.

Just before the 2019–20 pre-season, Cluess took a leave of absence to deal with personal health issues. Associate head coach Tra Arnold took over head coaching duties for the remainder of the season.

On March 13, 2020, Cluess stepped down from Iona due to his health issues. Rick Pitino was named to replace Cluess as head coach the next day.

== Head coaching record ==
=== Junior college ===
Record table
Season	Team	Overall	Conference	Standing	Postseason
Suffolk Pioneers (Region XV) (2005–2006)
2005–06	Suffolk	22–10	20–9		2–1
Suffolk:		22–10 (.688)			
Total:		22–10 (.688)			

=== College ===
Record table
Season	Team	Overall	Conference	Standing	Postseason
LIU Post Pioneers (East Coast Conference) (2006–2010)
2006–07	LIU Post	19–11	13–7	3rd	
2007–08	LIU Post	26–5	18–2	1st	NCAA Division II Regionals
2008–09	LIU Post	30–1	18–0	1st	NCAA Division II Elite Eight
2009–10	LIU Post	23–6	18–3	T–1st	
LIU Post:		98–23 (.810)	67–12 (.848)		
Iona Gaels (Metro Atlantic Athletic Conference) (2010–2020)
2010–11	Iona	25–12	13–5	2nd	CIT Runner-up
2011–12	Iona	25–8	15–3	1st	NCAA Division I First Four
2012–13	Iona	20–14	11–7	4th	NCAA Division I Round of 64
2013–14	Iona	22–11	17–3	1st	NIT first round
2014–15	Iona	26–9	17–3	1st	NIT first round
2015–16	Iona	22–11	16–4	2nd	NCAA Division I Round of 64
2016–17	Iona	22–13	12–8	T–3rd	NCAA Division I Round of 64
2017–18	Iona	20–14	11–7	4th	NCAA Division I Round of 64
2018–19	Iona	17–16	12–6	1st	NCAA Division I Round of 64
Iona:		199–108 (.648)	124–46 (.729)		
Total:		297–131 (.694)			
National champion Postseason invitational champion Conference regular season champion Conference regular season and conference tournament champion Division regular season champion Division regular season and conference tournament champion Conference tournament champion
