= Rickey McGill =

American basketball player

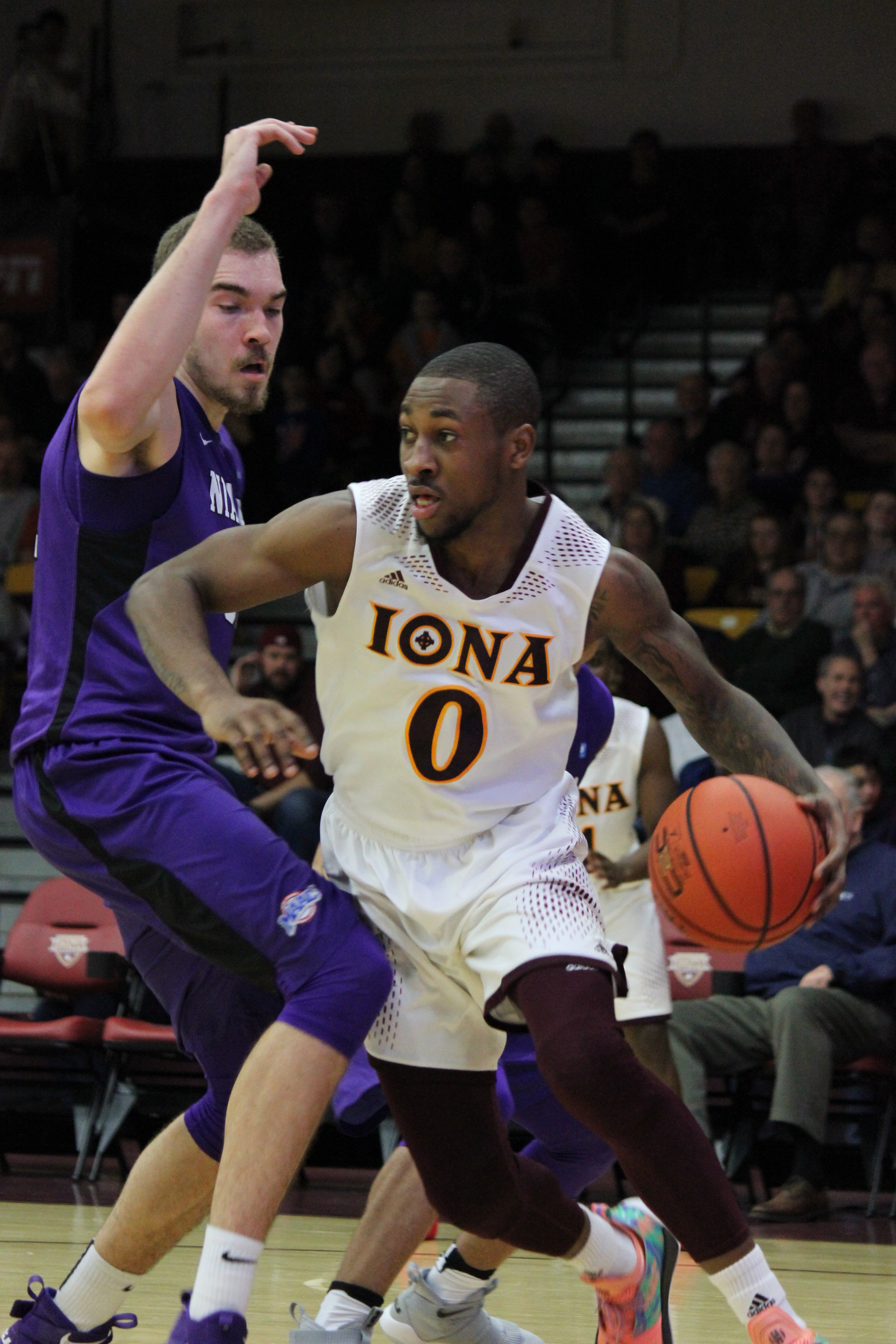
- McGill in 2018

No. 2 – Cibona
- Position: Point guard
- League: Croatian League; ABA League

Personal information
- Born: June 19, 1997 (age 29)
- Listed height: 6 ft 2 in (1.88 m)
- Listed weight: 185 lb (84 kg)

Career information
- High school: Spring Valley (Spring Valley, New York)
- College: Iona (2015–2019)
- NBA draft: 2019: undrafted
- Playing career: 2019–present

Career history
- 2019–2020: Panionios
- 2020–2021: Plymouth Raiders
- 2021: Rapla KK
- 2021–2022: Soproni KC
- 2023: Franklin Bulls
- 2023–2024: Newcastle Eagles
- 2024–2025: Dziki Warszawa
- 2025: Sheffield Sharks
- 2025–2026: Patrioti Levice
- 2026–present: Cibona Zagreb

Career highlights
- SLB Cup Winner (2025); First-team All-MAAC (2019); Second-team All-MAAC (2018); MAAC tournament MVP (2019); BBL All-Star-British Basketball League (2024); MVP-European North Basketball League (2024)

Rickey Isaiah Justin McGill (born June 19, 1997) is an American professional basketball player for Cibona Zagreb of Croatian League. He played college basketball for the Iona Gaels.

== High school career ==
McGill attended Spring Valley High School. He helped lead Spring Valley to a 23-2 record during his senior season and an appearance in the state final four, earning Section 1's Mr. Basketball honors. McGill averaged 23.3 points per game. In the Class A regional final against Saugerties High School, McGill hit the game-winning buzzer-beating three-pointer and finished with 21 points and four assists. He finished second on Rockland County's all-time scoring list with 1,463 points.

== College career ==
McGill averaged 2.8 points per game as a freshman at Iona and remained with the program even though coach Tim Cluess advised him to transfer. McGill entered the starting lineup in his following season. On February 25, 2018, he scored a career-high 40 points in a 110–101 loss to Rider. As a junior, McGill averaged 13.4 points, 5.6 assists and four rebounds per game, earning Second Team All-Metro Atlantic Athletic Conference (MAAC) honors. In his senior season, after leading Iona to the 2019 MAAC tournament title and winning most valuable player accolades, he became the first player in conference history to appear in the NCAA tournament for four straight years. McGill averaged 15.8 points, 4.8 assists and 4.5 rebounds per game and was named to the First Team All-MAAC.

== Professional career ==
On August 22, 2019, McGill signed his first professional contract with Panionios of the Greek Basket League. He averaged 7.6 points, 2.7 rebounds and 3.5 assists per game and parted ways with the club after the league was suspended indefinitely due to the COVID-19 pandemic.

On August 27, 2020, McGill signed with the Plymouth Raiders of the British Basketball League.

McGill began the 2021–22 season in Estonia with Rapla KK, playing five games before joining Soproni KC of the Hungarian Nemzeti Bajnokság I/A in November 2021. He played his last game for Soproni on January 22, 2022, due to injury.

McGill had a trial with French team Élan Béarnais in January 2023 but was not signed.

On March 25, 2023, McGill signed with the Franklin Bulls for the 2023 New Zealand NBL season.

In July 2023, McGill signed with the Newcastle Eagles of the British Basketball League (BBL). McGill was the ENBL regular season MVP, leading the ENBL in steals and sets a record of 8 steals in one game.Helping his Eagles team make it to the playoffs but came up short in the Quarter Finals.Averaging 18 points per game, 6 assist per game,Earning him a spot on the BBL All Star team helping the Eagles get all the way to the Final Four in the BBL Playoffs.

On June 26, 2024, he signed with Dziki Warszawa of the Polish Basketball League (PLK).

On July 1, 2025, he signed with Patrioti Levice of Slovak Extraliga (basketball) (SLB).
