= 2017–18 American Eagles men's basketball team =

American college basketball season

2017–18 American Eagles men's basketball
- Conference: Patriot League
- Record: 6–24 (3–15 Patriot)
- Head coach: Mike Brennan (5th season)
- Assistant coaches: Scott Greenman; Matt Wolff; Eddie Jackson
- Home arena: Bender Arena

2017–18 Patriot League men's basketball standings
	Conf.				Overall
Team	W		L	PCT	W		L	PCT
Bucknell †	16	–	2	.889	25	–	10	.714
Colgate	12	–	6	.667	19	–	14	.576
Navy	11	–	7	.611	20	–	12	.625
Lehigh	11	–	7	.611	16	–	14	.533
Boston University	10	–	8	.556	15	–	16	.484
Holy Cross	8	–	10	.444	12	–	19	.387
Lafayette	7	–	11	.389	10	–	21	.323
Army	6	–	12	.333	13	–	17	.433
Loyola (MD)	6	–	12	.333	9	–	22	.290
American	3	–	15	.167	6	–	24	.200
† 2018 Patriot League tournament winner

The 2017–18 American Eagles men's basketball team represented American University during the 2017–18 NCAA Division I men's basketball season. The Eagles, led by fifth-year head coach Mike Brennan, played their home games at Bender Arena in Washington, D.C. as members of the Patriot League. They finished the season 6–24, 3–15 in Patriot League play to finish in last place. They lost in the first round of the Patriot League tournament to Lafayette.

== Previous season ==
The Eagles finished the 2016–17 season 8–22, 5–13 in Patriot League play to finish in a tie for ninth place. As the No. 9 seed in the Patriot League tournament, they lost in the first round to Army.

== Roster ==
2017–18 American Eagles men's basketball team
Players
Coaches

Pos.	#	Name	Height	Weight	Year	Previous school	Hometown
G	0	Sa'eed Nelson	6 ft 1 in (1.85 m)	175 lb (79 kg)	RS So	St. Augustine Prep	Pleasantville, NJ
F	1	Jesse Little	6 ft 10 in (2.08 m)	178 lb (81 kg)	Fr	Starkville HS	Starkville, MS
G	2	Stacy Beckton, Jr.	6 ft 4 in (1.93 m)	171 lb (78 kg)	Fr	Atlantic HS	Daytona Beach, FL
G	3	James Washington	6 ft 1 in (1.85 m)	160 lb (73 kg)	Jr	Price School	Norwalk, CA
G	5	Larry Motuzis	6 ft 6 in (1.98 m)	200 lb (91 kg)	RS Jr	Hinsdale South HS; Saint Xavier	Darien, IL
G	10	CB Diallo	6 ft 1 in (1.85 m)	167 lb (76 kg)	RS Jr	Kilgore	Thiès, Senegal
G	13	Marvin Bragg	6 ft 6 in (1.98 m)	190 lb (86 kg)	RS Fr	Gahr HS	Cerritos, CA
G	14	Justin Perez	6 ft 1 in (1.85 m)	155 lb (70 kg)	So	Gulliver Prep	Miami, FL
G	15	Tyler McFarland	6 ft 2 in (1.88 m)	184 lb (83 kg)	Fr	New Hampton School	Denver, CO
F	22	Sam Iorio	6 ft 6 in (1.98 m)	230 lb (104 kg)	Fr	Parkland HS	Allentown, PA
F/C	23	Mark Gasperini	6 ft 10 in (2.08 m)	250 lb (113 kg)	So	Brimmer and May School	Moscow, Russia
G	25	Kevin Brown	5 ft 8 in (1.73 m)	160 lb (73 kg)	Jr	Montclair Kimberley Academy	West Orange, NJ
F	30	Nick Macarchuk	6 ft 5 in (1.96 m)	188 lb (85 kg)	Fr	St. Thomas More Prep	Alamo, CA
F	33	Drew Lamont	6 ft 7 in (2.01 m)	210 lb (95 kg)	Fr	American Heritage School	Plantation, FL
F	45	Matt Cimino	6 ft 10 in (2.08 m)	212 lb (96 kg)	Jr	Worcester Academy; George Washington	Falmouth, ME

Head coach

- Mike Brennan (Princeton)

Assistant coach(es)

- Scott Greenman (Princeton)
- Matt Wolff (Boston University)
- Eddie Jackson (Ohio State)

Legend

- (C) Team captain
- (S) Suspended
- (I) Ineligible
- (W) Walk-on
- Injured
- Current redshirt

Roster
Last update: December 28, 2017

== Schedule and results ==
Date time, TV	Rank^{#}	Opponent^{#}	Result	Record	Site (attendance) city, state
Exhibition Tour of Australia
Aug 15, 2017*		vs. Cairns Taipans	L 70–89		Early Settler Stadium; Cairns, Australia
Aug 17, 2017*		vs. Sydney Kings	L 67–88		Whitlam Centre Liverpool; Sydney, Australia
Aug 19, 2017*		vs. Sydney Comets	L 77–85		Alexandria Basketball Stadium; Sydney, Australia
Non-conference regular season
Nov 10, 2017*; 9:00 pm, FSKC		at Kansas State	L 45–83	0–1	Bramlage Coliseum (8,218); Manhattan, KS
Nov 15, 2017*; 7:00 pm, ATTSNP		at No. 24 West Virginia	L 64–98	0–2	WVU Coliseum (9,180); Morgantown, WV
Nov 18, 2017*; 2:00 pm		at Wagner	L 70–71	0–3	Spiro Sports Center (1,128); Staten Island, NY
Nov 21, 2017*; 7:00 pm, ESPN3		at New Hampshire	W 74–70	1–3	Lundholm Gym (474); Durham, NH
Nov 25, 2017*; 4:00 pm		VMI	W 69–64	2–3	Bender Arena (422); Washington, D.C.
Nov 29, 2017*; 7:00 pm		at Saint Francis (PA)	L 89–100	2–4	DeGol Arena (1,013); Loretto, PA
Dec 2, 2017*; 4:00 pm		at Maryland Eastern Shore	L 70–74	2–5	Hytche Athletic Center (1,087); Princess Anne, MD
Dec 6, 2017*; 7:00 pm, ESPN3		at Western Illinois	L 56–69	2–6	Western Hall (616); Macomb, IL
Dec 9, 2017*; 4:00 pm, NBCSW+		Howard	W 74–63	3–6	Bender Arena (2,213); Washington, D.C.
Dec 18, 2017*; 7:00 pm		Mount St. Mary's	L 56–59	3–7	Bender Arena (283); Washington, D.C.
Dec 21, 2017*; 7:00 pm, FS1		at Marquette	L 51–92	3–8	BMO Harris Bradley Center (12,683); Milwaukee, WI
Patriot League regular season
Dec 29, 2017; 7:00 pm		at Bucknell	L 55–84	3–9 (0–1)	Sojka Pavilion (2,782); Lewisburg, PA
Jan 2, 2018; 7:00 pm		Colgate	L 63–72	3–10 (0–2)	Bender Arena (135); Washington, D.C.
Jan 5, 2018; 7:00 pm		at Navy	L 64–70	3–11 (0–3)	Alumni Hall (1,178); Annapolis, MD
Jan 8, 2018; 7:00 pm		Army	L 54–58	3–12 (0–4)	Bender Arena (303); Washington, D.C.
Jan 11, 2018; 7:00 pm		Loyola (MD)	W 76–65	4–12 (1–4)	Bender Arena (456); Washington, D.C.
Jan 14, 2018; 2:00 pm		at Lehigh	L 66–76	4–13 (1–5)	Stabler Arena (1,358); Bethlehem, PA
Jan 17, 2018; 7:00 pm		at Boston University	W 69–58	5–13 (2–5)	Case Gym (705); Boston, MA
Jan 20, 2018; 2:00 pm		Lafayette	L 53–62	5–14 (2–6)	Bender Arena (1,023); Washington, D.C.
Jan 22, 2018; 7:00 pm, CBSSN		Holy Cross	L 57–60	5–15 (2–7)	Bender Arena (1,209); Washington, D.C.
Jan 27, 2018; 2:00 pm		at Colgate	L 69–83	5–16 (2–8)	Cotterell Court (848); Hamilton, NY
Jan 31, 2018; 7:00 pm		Navy	L 44–61	5–17 (2–9)	Bender Arena (583); Washington, D.C.
Feb 3, 2018; 3:00 pm		at Army	L 70–82	5–18 (2–10)	Christl Arena (835); West Point, NY
Feb 7, 2018; 7:00 pm		at Loyola (MD)	L 69–72	5–19 (2–11)	Reitz Arena (514); Baltimore, MD
Feb 10, 2018; 2:00 pm, NBCSW		Lehigh	L 78–80 ^{OT}	5–20 (2–12)	Bender Arena (705); Washington, D.C.
Feb 14, 2018; 7:00 pm		Boston University	W 60–56	6–20 (3–12)	Bender Arena (505); Washington, D.C.
Feb 17, 2018; 2:00 pm		at Lafayette	L 85–90	6–21 (3–13)	Kirby Sports Center (2,147); Easton, PA
Feb 21, 2018; 7:00 pm		at Holy Cross	L 64–70	6–22 (3–14)	Hart Center (1,394); Worcester, MA
Feb 24, 2018; 2:00 pm		Bucknell	L 61–80	6–23 (3–15)	Bender Arena (1,298); Washington, D.C.
Patriot League tournament
Feb 27, 2018; 7:30 pm, PLN	(10)	at (7) Lafayette; First round	L 86–93	6–24	Kirby Sports Center (1,774); Easton, PA
*Non-conference game. ^{#}Rankings from AP poll. (#) Tournament seedings in parentheses. All times are in Eastern Time.

== See also ==
2017–18 American Eagles women's basketball team
