= 2017–18 UConn Huskies men's basketball team =

American college basketball season

2017–18 UConn Huskies men's basketball
- Conference: American Athletic Conference
- Record: 0–18 (14 wins vacated) (0–11 AAC, 7 wins vacated)
- Head coach: Kevin Ollie (6th season)
- Assistant coaches: Raphael Chillious; Ricky Moore; Dwayne Killings
- Home arena: Harry A. Gampel Pavilion; XL Center

2017–18 American Athletic Conference men's basketball standings
	Conf.				Overall
Team	W		L	PCT	W		L	PCT
No. 6 Cincinnati †	16	–	2	.889	31	–	5	.861
No. 16 Wichita State	14	–	4	.778	25	–	8	.758
No. 21 Houston	14	–	4	.778	27	–	8	.771
Tulsa	12	–	6	.667	19	–	12	.613
Memphis	10	–	8	.556	21	–	13	.618
UCF	9	–	9	.500	19	–	13	.594
Temple	8	–	10	.444	17	–	16	.515
UConn	7	–	11	.389	14	–	18	.438
SMU	6	–	12	.333	17	–	16	.515
Tulane	5	–	13	.278	14	–	17	.452
East Carolina	4	–	14	.222	10	–	20	.333
South Florida	3	–	15	.167	10	–	22	.313
† 2018 AAC tournament winner Rankings from AP poll

The 2017–18 UConn Huskies men's basketball team represented the University of Connecticut in the 2017–18 NCAA Division I men's basketball season. The Huskies were led by sixth-year head coach Kevin Ollie. The Huskies split their home games between the XL Center in Hartford, Connecticut, and the Harry A. Gampel Pavilion on the UConn campus in Storrs, Connecticut as members of the American Athletic Conference. They finished the season 14–18, 7–11 in AAC play to finish in eighth place. They lost in the first round of the AAC tournament to SMU.

The school announced on January 26, 2018, that the NCAA was investigating recruitment of at least three basketball players for possible recruiting violations. On March 10, the school fired head coach Kevin Ollie for just cause related to the NCAA investigation. On March 22, 2018, it was announced that the school had hired Dan Hurley as head coach. On July 2, 2019, the wins for the 2017–18 season were vacated due to NCAA Sanctions.

== Previous season ==
The Huskies finished the 2016–17 season 16–17, 9–9 in AAC play to finish in a tie for fifth place. They defeated South Florida and Houston to advance to the semifinals of the AAC tournament where they lost to Cincinnati.

== Offseason ==
=== Departures ===
Name	Number	Pos.	Height	Weight	Year	Hometown	Notes
Vance Jackson	5	F	6'8"	229	Freshman	Pasadena, CA	Transferred to New Mexico
Kentan Facey	12	F	6'10"	227	Senior	Trelawny, Jamaica	Graduated
Steven Enoch	13	F	6'11"	258	Sophomore	Norwalk, CT	Transferred to Louisville
Rodney Purvis	15	G	6'4"	205	RS Senior	Raleigh, NC	Graduated
Juwan Durham	23	F	6'11"	207	Freshman	Tampa, FL	Transferred to Notre Dame
Restinel Lomotey	33	G	6'3"	198	Junior	Branford, CT	No longer on official roster
Amida Brimah	35	C	7'0"	230	Senior	Accra, Ghana	Graduated

=== Incoming transfers ===
Name	Number	Pos.	Height	Weight	Year	Hometown	Notes
Antwoine Anderson	0	G	6'1"	190	Graduate Student	Rochester, NY	Transferred from Fordham. Under NCAA transfer rules, Anderson will be eligible to start at the beginning the 2017–18 season. Anderson has one year of remaining eligibility.
Eric Cobb	23	F	6'9"	295	Junior	Jacksonville, FL	Transferred from Chipola College. Under NCAA transfer rules, Cobb will be eligible to start at the beginning the 2017–18 season. Cobb will have two years of remaining eligibility.
David Onuorah	34	F	6'9"	230	Graduate Student	Lithonia, Ga.	Transferred from Cornell. Under NCAA transfer rules, Onuorah will be eligible to start at the beginning the 2017–18 season. Onuorah has one year of remaining eligibility.
Kwintin Williams	11	PF	6'7"	215	Sophomore	Anchorage, AK	Transferred from Arizona Western College. Under NCAA transfer rules, Williams will be eligible to start at the beginning the 2017–18 season. Williams will have three years of remaining eligibility.
Sidney Wilson	15	F	6'7"	183	Freshman	Bronx, NY	Transferred from St. John's. Under NCAA transfer rules, Wilson will be eligible to start at the beginning the 2018–19 season. Wilson will have four years of remaining eligibility.

=== 2017 recruiting class ===
College recruiting
Name	Hometown	School	Height	Weight	Commit date
Josh Carlton; C	Hyattsville, MD	DeMatha Catholic	6 ft 9 in (2.06 m)	200 lb (91 kg)	Nov 11, 2016
Josh Carlton; C	Recruit ratings: Scout: Rivals: 247Sports: ESPN: (80)				
Tyler Polley; PF	Fort Lauderdale, FL	The Sagemont School	6 ft 7 in (2.01 m)	190 lb (86 kg)	Nov 11, 2016
Tyler Polley; PF	Recruit ratings: Scout: Rivals: 247Sports: ESPN: (81)				
Isaiah Whaley; PF	Charlotte, NC	Evelyn Mack Academy	6 ft 9 in (2.06 m)	200 lb (91 kg)	May 11, 2017
Isaiah Whaley; PF	Recruit ratings: Scout: Rivals: ESPN: (76)				

== Preseason ==
At the conference's annual media day, the Huskies were picked to finish in sixth place in the AAC. Junior guard Jalen Adams was named to the preseason All-AAC first team.

== Roster ==
2017–18 UConn Huskies men's basketball team
Players
Coaches

Pos.	#	Name	Height	Weight	Year	Previous school	Hometown
G	0	Antwoine Anderson	6 ft 2 in (1.88 m)	170 lb (77 kg)	GS	Fordham	Rochester, NY
G	1	Christian Vital	6 ft 2 in (1.88 m)	178 lb (81 kg)	So	St. Thomas More	Queens, NY
G	3	Alterique Gilbert (injured)	6 ft 0 in (1.83 m)	171 lb (78 kg)	RS Fr	Miller Grove	Lithonia, GA
G	4	Jalen Adams	6 ft 3 in (1.91 m)	195 lb (88 kg)	Jr	Brewster Academy	Roxbury, MA
F	5	Isaiah Whaley	6 ft 9 in (2.06 m)	190 lb (86 kg)	Fr	Mt. Zion Prep	Charlotte, NC
F	11	Kwintin Williams	6 ft 7 in (2.01 m)	215 lb (98 kg)	So	Arizona Western	Anchorage, AK
F	12	Tyler Polley	6 ft 8 in (2.03 m)	190 lb (86 kg)	Fr	Sagemont	Fort Lauderdale, FL
F	15	Sidney Wilson (I) (redshirt)	6 ft 7 in (2.01 m)	183 lb (83 kg)	Fr	St. John's University	Bronx, NY
F	21	Mamadou Diarra	6 ft 8 in (2.03 m)	217 lb (98 kg)	RS Fr	Putnam Science Academy	Queens, NY
G/F	22	Terry Larrier	6 ft 8 in (2.03 m)	185 lb (84 kg)	RS Jr	VCU	Bronx, NY
F	23	Eric Cobb	6 ft 9 in (2.06 m)	280 lb (127 kg)	Jr	Chipola	Jacksonville, FL
F	24	Christian Foxen (W)	6 ft 8 in (2.03 m)	225 lb (102 kg)	Sr	South Kent	Rocky Hill, CT
C	25	Josh Carlton	6 ft 9 in (2.06 m)	242 lb (110 kg)	Fr	DeMatha Catholic	Hyattsville, MD
G	31	Michael Noyes (W)	6 ft 0 in (1.83 m)	190 lb (86 kg)	GS	Granby Memorial	Granby, CT
F	34	David Onuorah	6 ft 9 in (2.06 m)	249 lb (113 kg)	GS	Cornell	Lithonia, GA
G	45	Omotayo Aiyegbusi (W)	6 ft 4 in (1.93 m)	206 lb (93 kg)	So	Saint Joseph's	Philadelphia, PA

Head coach

- Kevin Ollie

Assistant coach(es)

- Raphael Chillious
- Ricky Moore
- Dwayne Killings

Legend

- (C) Team captain
- (S) Suspended
- (I) Ineligible
- (W) Walk-on
- Injured
- Current redshirt

Roster
Last update: 6/6/17

== Schedule and results ==
Date time, TV	Rank^{#}	Opponent^{#}	Result	Record	High points	High rebounds	High assists	Site (attendance) city, state
Exhibition
Oct 25, 2017*; 7:00 pm, Fox Sports Go		vs. Providence; ARC disaster relief exhibition	L 76–90	–	22 – Adams	4 – 4 tied	2 – 3 tied	Mohegan Sun Arena (6,415); Uncasville, CT
Oct 30, 2017*; 7:00 pm, HuskyVision		Merrimack	W 79–63	–	17 – Larrier	6 – Tied	5 – Tied	XL Center (3,861); Hartford, CT
Nov 5, 2017*; 5:30 pm, HuskyVision		Queens (NY)	W 100–43	–	20 – Carlton	7 – Vital	6 – Polley	Harry A. Gampel Pavilion (3,277); Storrs, CT
Regular season
Nov 10, 2017*; 7:00 pm, SNY		Colgate	W 70–58	1–0	27 – Larrier	8 – Cobb	6 – Anderson	Harry A. Gampel Pavilion (7,154); Storrs, CT
Nov 14, 2017*; 7:00 pm, SNY		Stony Brook; PK80–Phil Knight Invitational	W 72–64	2–0	19 – Adams	7 – Tied	4 – Gilbert	XL Center (5,431); Hartford, CT
Nov 19, 2017*; 6:00 pm, SNY		Boston University	W 85–66	3–0	30 – Vital	7 – Larrier	6 – Gilbert	XL Center (6,308); Hartford, CT
Nov 23, 2017*; 9:00 pm, ESPNU		vs. Oregon; PK80–Phil Knight Invitational Victory Bracket quarterfinals	W 71–63	4–0	18 – Larrier	7 – Larrier	2 – Adams	Moda Center (13,439); Portland, OR
Nov 25, 2017*; 12:00 am, ESPN		vs. No. 4 Michigan State; PK80–Phil Knight Invitational Victory Bracket semifinals	L 57–77	4–1	22 – Adams	7 – Larrier	3 – Gilbert	Memorial Coliseum (8,853); Portland, OR
Nov 26, 2017*; 3:00 pm, ESPN		vs. Arkansas; PK80–Phil Knight Invitational Victory Bracket 3rd Place Game	L 67–102	4–2	25 – Adams	5 – Diarra	3 – Adams	Moda Center (11,571); Portland, OR
Nov 29, 2017*; 7:00 pm, SNY		Columbia	W 77–73 ^{OT}	5–2	29 – Vital	14 – Larrier	7 – Adams	Harry A. Gampel Pavilion (3,808); Storrs, CT
Dec 2, 2017*; 4:00 pm, SNY		Monmouth	W 84–81 ^{OT}	6–2	31 – Adams	8 – Larrier	4 – Adams	XL Center (6,582); Hartford, CT
Dec 5, 2017*; 9:00 pm, ESPN		vs. Syracuse; Jimmy V Classic/Rivalry	L 63–72	6–3	22 – Adams	7 – Diarra	4 – Vital	Madison Square Garden (17,532); New York, NY
Dec 9, 2017*; 2:00 pm, ESPNews		Coppin State	W 72–59	7–3	15 – Adams	8 – Whaley	8 – Adams	Harry A. Gampel Pavilion (3,046); Storrs, CT
Dec 21, 2017*; 9:00 pm, ESPN2		at No. 18 Arizona	L 58–73	7–4	18 – Larrier	7 – Vital	2 – Tied	McKale Center (14,392); Tucson, AZ
Dec 23, 2017*; 2:30 pm, ESPN2		at Auburn	L 64–89	7–5	14 – Adams	7 – Adams	4 – Adams	Auburn Arena (8,039); Auburn, AL
Dec 30, 2017; 12:00 pm, CBS		No. 8 Wichita State	L 62–72	7–6 (0–1)	18 – Tied	5 – Tied	6 – Adams	XL Center (15,564); Hartford, CT
Jan 3, 2018; 7:00 pm, ESPNews		at Tulsa	L 88–90 ^{2OT}	7–7 (0–2)	29 – Adams	13 – Adams	9 – Adams	Reynolds Center (3,903); Tulsa, OK
Jan 6, 2018; 12:00 pm, ESPNews		East Carolina	W 70–65	8–7 (1–2)	18 – Adams	7 – Whaley	4 – Adams	XL Center (6,717); Hartford, CT
Jan 10, 2018; 7:00 pm, CBSSN		UCF	W 62–53	9–7 (2–2)	18 – Vital	7 – Vital	5 – Adams	Harry A. Gampel Pavilion (5,065); Storrs, CT
Jan 13, 2018; 1:00 pm, ESPNews		at Tulane	W 67–57	10–7 (3–2)	25 – Adams	7 – Onuorah	6 – Adams	Devlin Fieldhouse (1,902); New Orleans, LA
Jan 16, 2018; 9:00 pm, CBSSN		at Memphis	L 49–73	10–8 (3–3)	15 – Carlton	9 – Carlton	3 – Anderson	FedEx Forum (2,417); Memphis, TN
Jan 20, 2018*; 12:00 pm, CBS		No. 1 Villanova	L 61–81	10–9	19 – Adams	9 – Carlton	5 – Adams	XL Center (15,564); Hartford, CT
Jan 25, 2018; 7:00 pm, CBSSN		SMU	W 63–52	11–9 (4–3)	20 – Vital	12 – Carlton	4 – Tied	Harry A. Gampel Pavilion (7,322); Storrs, CT
Jan 28, 2018; 8:00 pm, ESPN2		at Temple	L 57–85	11–10 (4–4)	15 – Vital	6 – Tied	3 – Tied	Liacouras Center (6,103); Philadelphia, PA
Jan 31, 2018; 9:00 pm, CBSSN		at UCF	L 61–70	11–11 (4–5)	15 – Larrier	9 – Vital	5 – Adams	CFE Arena (5,233); Orlando, FL
Feb 3, 2018; 12:00 pm, ESPN2		No. 8 Cincinnati	L 57–65	11–12 (4–6)	20 – Adams	9 – Vital	4 – Adams	Harry A. Gampel Pavilion (9,170); Storrs, CT
Feb 7, 2018; 7:00 pm, ESPNU		South Florida	W 68–65	12–12 (5–6)	19 – Adams	6 – Carlton	6 – Adams	Harry A. Gampel Pavilion (6,636); Storrs, CT
Feb 10, 2018; 6:00 pm, ESPN2		at No. 22 Wichita State	L 74–95	12–13 (5–7)	22 – Tied	8 – Williams	4 – Adams	Charles Koch Arena (10,506); Wichita, KS
Feb 15, 2018; 7:00 pm, ESPNU		Tulsa	L 71–73	12–14 (5–8)	20 – Vital	10 – Vital	11 – Adams	XL Center (10,656); Hartford, CT
Feb 18, 2018; 3:00 pm, ESPNews		at East Carolina	W 84–80	13–14 (6–8)	26 – Adams	6 – Vital	7 – Anderson	Williams Arena (4,524); Greeenville, NC
Feb 22, 2018; 7:00 pm, ESPN		at No. 11 Cincinnati	L 52–77	13–15 (6–9)	15 – Vital	9 – Larrier	3 – Anderson	BB&T Arena (8,217); Highland Heights, KY
Feb 25, 2018; 4:00 pm, ESPN		Memphis	L 79–83	13–16 (6–10)	25 – Adams	7 – Williams	5 – Adams	Harry A. Gampel Pavilion (8,574); Storrs, CT
Feb 28, 2018; 7:00 pm, CBSSN		Temple	W 72–66	14–16 (7–10)	25 – Adams	12 – Vital	8 – Adams	Harry A. Gampel Pavilion (7,674); Storrs, CT
Mar 4, 2018; 4:00 pm, CBSSN		at No. 25 Houston	L 71–81	14–17 (7–11)	22 – Adams	7 – Larrier	6 – Adams	H&PE Arena (5,237); Houston, TX
American Athletic Conference tournament
Mar 8, 2018; 12:00 pm, ESPNU	(8)	vs. (9) SMU; First round	L 73–80	14–18	24 – Vital	8 – Diarra	5 – Adams	Amway Center (7,856); Orlando, FL
*Non-conference game. ^{#}Rankings from AP Poll. (#) Tournament seedings in parentheses. All times are in Eastern Time. Source:
