= 2017–18 Lafayette Leopards men's basketball team =

American college basketball season

2017–18 Lafayette Leopards men's basketball
- Conference: Patriot League
- Record: 10–21 (7–11 Patriot)
- Head coach: Fran O'Hanlon (23rd season)
- Assistant coaches: Jimmy Fenerty; Jarren Dyson; Justin Burrell
- Home arena: Kirby Sports Center

2017–18 Patriot League men's basketball standings
	Conf.				Overall
Team	W		L	PCT	W		L	PCT
Bucknell †	16	–	2	.889	25	–	10	.714
Colgate	12	–	6	.667	19	–	14	.576
Navy	11	–	7	.611	20	–	12	.625
Lehigh	11	–	7	.611	16	–	14	.533
Boston University	10	–	8	.556	15	–	16	.484
Holy Cross	8	–	10	.444	12	–	19	.387
Lafayette	7	–	11	.389	10	–	21	.323
Army	6	–	12	.333	13	–	17	.433
Loyola (MD)	6	–	12	.333	9	–	22	.290
American	3	–	15	.167	6	–	24	.200
† 2018 Patriot League tournament winner

The 2017–18 Lafayette Leopards men's basketball team represented Lafayette College during the 2017–18 NCAA Division I men's basketball season. The Leopards, led by 23rd-year head coach Fran O'Hanlon, played their home games at the Kirby Sports Center in Easton, Pennsylvania as members of the Patriot League. They finished the season 10–21, 7–11 in Patriot League play to finish in seventh place. They defeated American in the first round of the Patriot League tournament before losing in the quarterfinals to Colgate.

== Previous season ==
The Leopards finished the 2016–17 season 9–21, 5–13 in Patriot League play to finish in a tie for ninth place. As the No. 10 seed in the Patriot League tournament, they lost in the first round to Loyola (MD).

== Offseason ==
=== 2017 recruiting class ===
College recruiting information (2017)
Name	Hometown	School	Height	Weight	Commit date
Alexander Petrie; PG	Richmond, VA	St. Christopher's School	6 ft 2 in (1.88 m)	180 lb (82 kg)	May 5, 2015
Alexander Petrie; PG	Recruit ratings: Scout: Rivals: (NR)				
Overall recruit ranking:
Note: In many cases, Scout, Rivals, 247Sports, On3, and ESPN may conflict in their listings of height and weight.; In these cases, the average was taken. ESPN grades are on a 100-point scale.; Sources: "2017 Team Ranking". Rivals.

== Roster ==
2017–18 Lafayette Leopards men's basketball team
Players
Coaches

Pos.	#	Name	Height	Weight	Year	Previous school	Hometown
G	4	Eric Stafford	6 ft 5 in (1.96 m)	172 lb (78 kg)	Sr	Pitman HS	Pitman, NJ
G	11	Justin Jaworski	6 ft 1 in (1.85 m)	188 lb (85 kg)	Fr	Perkiomen Valley HS	Wchwenksville, PA
G	12	Auston Evans	6 ft 6 in (1.98 m)	190 lb (86 kg)	Jr	Greenhill HS	McKinney, TX
F	13	Matt Klinewski	6 ft 8 in (2.03 m)	235 lb (107 kg)	Sr	Eastern Regional HS	Voorhees, NJ
G	14	Cal Reichwein	6 ft 3 in (1.91 m)	210 lb (95 kg)	So	Central Bucks West HS	Doylestown, PA
G	20	E.J. Stephens	6 ft 3 in (1.91 m)	169 lb (77 kg)	Fr	St. Thomas Aquinas HS	Plantation, FL
G	21	Alex Petrie	6 ft 3 in (1.91 m)	200 lb (91 kg)	Fr	St. Christopher's School	Midlothian, VA
F	23	Lukas Jarrett	6 ft 7 in (2.01 m)	205 lb (93 kg)	So	Northport HS	Northport, NY
G	24	Kyle Stout	6 ft 6 in (1.98 m)	193 lb (88 kg)	So	Parkland HS	Schnecksville, PA
F	33	Paulius Zalys	6 ft 7 in (2.01 m)	215 lb (98 kg)	Jr	Perkiomen School	Kaunas, Lithuania
F	44	Dylan Hastings	6 ft 8 in (2.03 m)	206 lb (93 kg)	Fr	Solanco HS	Quarryville, PA
F	54	Myles Cherry	6 ft 9 in (2.06 m)	239 lb (108 kg)	So	Choate Rosemary Hall	Newcastle, Australia

Head coach

- Fran O'Hanlon (Villanova)

Assistant coach(es)

- Jimmy Fenerty (Dickinson State)
- Jarren Dyson (Emory & Henry)
- Justin Purrell (Holy Cross)

Legend

- (C) Team captain
- (S) Suspended
- (I) Ineligible
- (W) Walk-on
- Injured
- Current redshirt

Roster
Last update: December 28, 2017

== Schedule and results ==
Date time, TV	Rank^{#}	Opponent^{#}	Result	Record	Site (attendance) city, state
Exhibition
Nov 4, 2017*; 1:00 pm		Penn State; OAA hurricane relief benefit	L 80–102		Kirby Sports Center; Easton, PA
Regular season
Nov 10, 2017*; 7:00 pm		at George Mason	L 65–67	0–1	EagleBank Arena (6,706); Fairfax, VA
Nov 14, 2017*; 7:00 pm		at NJIT	L 80–96	0–2	Wellness and Events Center (851); Newark, New Jersey
Nov 17, 2017*; 8:00 pm, FS2		vs. No. 5 Villanova; Allentown Showcase	L 57–104	0–3	PPL Center (6,652); Allentown, PA
Nov 22, 2017*; 7:00 pm		at Princeton	L 46–60	0–4	Jadwin Gymnasium (1,575); Princeton, NJ
Nov 26, 2017*; 2:00 pm		Saint Peter's	L 82–86	0–5	Kirby Sports Center (1,745); Easton, PA
Nov 29, 2017*; 7:00 pm		at Drexel	L 67–68	0–6	Daskalakis Athletic Center (617); Philadelphia, PA
Dec 2, 2017*; 2:00 pm		Quinnipiac	W 79–58	1–6	Kirby Sports Center (1,449); Easton, PA
Dec 6, 2017*; 8:00 pm		Penn	L 68–73	1–7	Kirby Sports Center (1,328); Easton, PA
Dec 9, 2017*; 3:30 pm		at Sacred Heart	L 50–62	1–8	William H. Pitt Center; Fairfield, CT
Dec 18, 2017*; 7:00 pm		Susquehanna	W 82–70	2–8	Kirby Sports Center (698); Easton, PA
Dec 20, 2017*; 7:00 pm		at Cornell	L 71–80	2–9	Newman Arena (475); Ithaca, NY
Patriot League regular season
Dec 29, 2017; 7:00 pm		Lehigh	L 74–79	2–10 (0–1)	Kirby Sports Center (1,673); Easton, PA
Jan 2, 2018; 7:00 pm		Holy Cross	W 60–48	3–10 (1–1)	Kirby Sports Center (1,147); Easton, PA
Jan 5, 2018; 7:00 pm		at Colgate	W 71–68	4–10 (2–1)	Cotterell Court (237); Hamilton, NY
Jan 8, 2018; 7:00 pm		Bucknell	L 75–80 ^{OT}	4–11 (2–2)	Kirby Sports Center (986); Easton, PA
Jan 11, 2018; 12:00 pm		at Army	L 71–81	4–12 (2–3)	Christl Arena (1,342); West Point, NY
Jan 14, 2018; 2:00 pm		at Loyola (MD)	L 77–83	4–13 (2–4)	Reitz Arena (517); Baltimore, MD
Jan 17, 2018; 7:00 pm		Navy	L 72–75	4–14 (2–5)	Kirby Sports Center (923); Easton, PA
Jan 20, 2018; 4:00 pm		at American	W 62–53	5–14 (3–5)	Bender Arena (1,023); Washington, D.C.
Jan 24, 2018; 7:00 pm		Boston University	L 72–75	5–15 (3–6)	Kirby Sports Center (1,144); Easton, PA
Jan 27, 2018; 2:00 pm		at Holy Cross	L 74–85	5–16 (3–7)	Hart Center (3,396); Worcester, MA
Jan 31, 2018; 7:00 pm		Colgate	W 93–83	6–16 (4–7)	Kirby Sports Center (1,145); Easton, PA
Feb 3, 2018; 7:00 pm		at Bucknell	L 59–74	6–17 (4–8)	Sojka Pavilion (3,509); Lewisburg, PA
Feb 7, 2018; 7:00 pm		Army	W 81–54	7–17 (5–8)	Kirby Sports Center (877); Easton, PA
Feb 11, 2018; 12:00 pm, CBSSN		Loyola (MD)	W 84–67	8–17 (6–8)	Kirby Sports Center (1,548); Easton, PA
Feb 14, 2018; 7:00 pm		at Navy	L 69–71	8–18 (6–9)	Alumni Hall (653); Annapolis, MD
Feb 17, 2018; 2:00 pm		American	W 90–85	9–18 (7–9)	Kirby Sports Center (2,147); Easton, PA
Feb 21, 2018; 7:00 pm		at Boston University	L 65–81	9–19 (7–10)	Case Gym (540); Boston, MA
Feb 24, 2018; 7:30 pm		at Lehigh	L 64–79	9–20 (7–11)	Stabler Arena (2,240); Bethlehem, PA
Patriot League tournament
Feb 27, 2018; 7:30 pm, Stadium	(7)	(10) American; First round	W 93–86	10–20	Kirby Sports Center (1,774); Easton, PA
Mar 1, 2018; 7:00 pm, Stadium	(7)	at (2) Colgate; Quarterfinals	L 54–76	10–21	Cotterell Court (1,338); Hamilton, NY
*Non-conference game. ^{#}Rankings from AP Poll. (#) Tournament seedings in parentheses. All times are in Eastern Time.

== See also ==
2017–18 Lafayette Leopards women's basketball team
