= Jimmy Allen (basketball) =

American college basketball coach

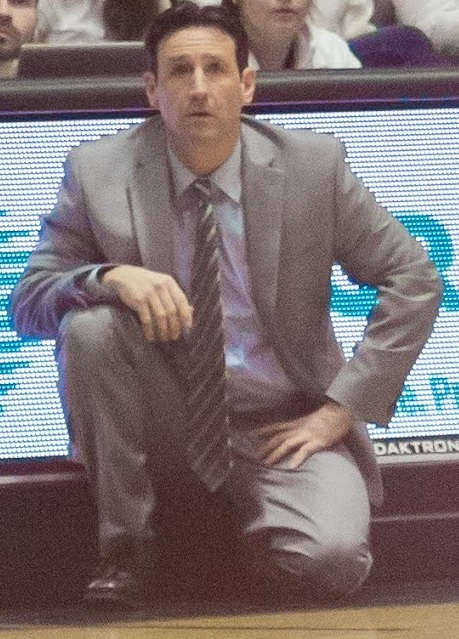
- Allen in 2020.

Current position
- Title: Head Coach
- Team: Emory & Henry
- Conference: SAC
- Record: 23–35 (.397)

Biographical details
- Born: June 15, 1971 (age 55); El Paso, Texas, U.S.

Playing career
- 1989–1993: Emory & Henry

Coaching career (HC unless noted)
- 1993–1996: Emory & Henry (assistant)
- 1996–2002: Navy (assistant)
- 2002–2004: Wofford (assistant)
- 2004–2010: Averett
- 2010–2016: Army (assistant)
- 2016–2023: Army
- 2023–2024: New Hampshire (AHC)
- 2024–present: Emory & Henry

Head coaching record
- Overall: 218–219 (.499)

James Byars Allen Jr. (born June 15, 1971) is an American college basketball coach. He was named the head men's basketball coach at Emory & Henry College on May 17, 2024. Allen was the head men's basketball coach at the United States Military Academy (Army) from 2016 to 2023 and was the head men's basketball coach at Averett University in Danville, Virginia from 2004 to 2010.

== Playing career ==
Born in El Paso, Texas, Allen lived in West Point, New York for much of his childhood; his father was a 1967 graduate of the U.S. Military Academy who served in the U.S. Army for 20 years. In eleventh grade, he moved to Roanoke, Virginia, where he graduated from Northside High School in 1989. At Emory & Henry College, Allen was a four-year starter for the Emory & Henry Wasps, playing in 117 games and ranked second all-time in assists with 455, and fourth all-time in steals with 162. In 2008, he was inducted in the Emory & Henry Athletic Hall of Fame. Allen graduated from Emory & Henry in 1993 with a bachelor's degree in accounting.

== Coaching career ==
After graduation, Allen got his coaching start at his alma mater, where he stayed for three seasons before joining Don DeVoe's staff at Navy, where he was part of two Patriot League title squads in 1997 and 1998.

From 2002 to 2004, Allen was an assistant at Wofford, before landing his first head coaching job at Averett, where he took over a 0–25 team to lead it to four NCAA Tournament appearances and 97–70 overall record in six seasons, as well as being named a USA South Athletic Conference Coach of the year in 2005, 2007, and 2008.

In 2010, Allen joined Zach Spiker's staff at Army, and was elevated to the head coaching position when Spiker left for Drexel on March 30, 2016.

== Head coaching record ==
Record table
Season	Team	Overall	Conference	Standing	Postseason
Averett Cougars (USA South Athletic Conference) (2004–2010)
2004–05	Averett	13–14	6–6	T–3rd	
2005–06	Averett	20–8	9–3	1st	
2006–07	Averett	20–7	9–3	1st	NCAA Division III First Round
2007–08	Averett	14–15	5–7	5th	NCAA Division III First Round
2008–09	Averett	20–10	10–2	1st	NCAA Division III Second Round
2009–10	Averett	10–16	6–6	4th	
Averett:		97–70 (.581)	45–27 (.625)		
Army Black Knights (Patriot League) (2016–2023)
2016–17	Army	13–19	6–12	8th	
2017–18	Army	13–17	6–12	T–8th	
2018–19	Army	13–19	8–10	T–5th	
2019–20	Army	15–15	10–8	T–4th	
2020–21	Army	12–10	7–7	2nd (North)	CBI Quarterfinal
2021–22	Army	15–16	9–9	5th	
2022–23	Army	17–16	10–8	4th	
Army:		98–112 (.467)	56–66 (.459)		
Emory & Henry Wasps (South Atlantic Conference) (2024–pres.)
2024-25	Emory & Henry	6–22	4–20	13th	
2025-26	Emory & Henry	16–13	11–11	7th	
2026-27	Emory & Henry	1–2	0–0		
Emory & Henry:		23–35 (.397)	15–31 (.326)		
Total:		218–219 (.499)			
National champion Postseason invitational champion Conference regular season champion Conference regular season and conference tournament champion Division regular season champion Division regular season and conference tournament champion Conference tournament champion
