= 2017–18 Loyola Greyhounds men's basketball team =

American college basketball season

2017–18 Loyola Greyhounds men's basketball
- Conference: Patriot League
- Record: 9–22 (6–12 Patriot)
- Head coach: G. G. Smith (5th season)
- Assistant coaches: Keith Booth; Trevor Quinn; Kevin Driscoll
- Home arena: Reitz Arena

2017–18 Patriot League men's basketball standings
	Conf.				Overall
Team	W		L	PCT	W		L	PCT
Bucknell †	16	–	2	.889	25	–	10	.714
Colgate	12	–	6	.667	19	–	14	.576
Navy	11	–	7	.611	20	–	12	.625
Lehigh	11	–	7	.611	16	–	14	.533
Boston University	10	–	8	.556	15	–	16	.484
Holy Cross	8	–	10	.444	12	–	19	.387
Lafayette	7	–	11	.389	10	–	21	.323
Army	6	–	12	.333	13	–	17	.433
Loyola (MD)	6	–	12	.333	9	–	22	.290
American	3	–	15	.167	6	–	24	.200
† 2018 Patriot League tournament winner

The 2017–18 Loyola Greyhounds men's basketball team represented Loyola University Maryland during the 2017–18 NCAA Division I men's basketball season. The Greyhounds, led by fifth-year head coach G. G. Smith, played their home games at Reitz Arena in Baltimore, Maryland as members of the Patriot League. They finished the season 9–22, 6–12 in Patriot League play to finish in a tie for eighth place. They defeated Army in the first round of the Patriot League tournament before losing in the quarterfinals to Bucknell.

On March 8, 2018, the school announced G. G. Smith had resigned as head coach. He finished at Loyola with a five-year record of 56–98. On March 28, the Greyhounds hired Georgia Tech assistant coach Tavaras Hardy for the head coaching job.

== Previous season ==
The Greyhounds finished the 2016–17 season 16–17, 8–10 in Patriot League play to finish in a tie for sixth place with Colgate. As the No. 7 seed in the Patriot League tournament, they defeated Lafayette in the first round before losing in the quarterfinals to Boston University. They received an invitation to the College Basketball Invitational where they defeated George Mason in the first round before losing in the quarterfinals to Coastal Carolina.

== Roster ==
2017–18 Loyola Greyhounds men's basketball team
Players
Coaches

Pos.	#	Name	Height	Weight	Year	Previous school	Hometown
G	0	Isaiah Hart	5 ft 11 in (1.8 m)	179 lb (81 kg)	Fr	Whitefield Academy	Morrow, GA
F	1	KaVaughn Scott	6 ft 8 in (2.03 m)	223 lb (101 kg)	So	OC Lutheran HS	Irvine, CA
G	2	Andre Walker	6 ft 0 in (1.83 m)	173 lb (78 kg)	Sr	Christ the King HS	Westbury, NY
G	3	Luke Johnson	6 ft 2 in (1.88 m)	172 lb (78 kg)	Fr	Lexington Catholic HS	Lexington, KY
G	4	Nevell Provo	6 ft 0 in (1.83 m)	186 lb (84 kg)	Jr	Pine Ridge	North Breston, NS
G	5	James Fives	6 ft 6 in (1.98 m)	196 lb (89 kg)	Fr	The Hill School	Scranton, PA
G	10	Andrew Kostecka III	6 ft 4 in (1.93 m)	180 lb (82 kg)	So	Clarksburg HS	Germantown, MD
F	11	River Reed	6 ft 8 in (2.03 m)	212 lb (96 kg)	Fr	Ronald Reagan HS	San Antonio, TX
G	14	Chuck Champion	6 ft 3 in (1.91 m)	186 lb (84 kg)	So	Friends' Central School	Philadelphia, PA
G	15	Sam Norton (W)	6 ft 2 in (1.88 m)	198 lb (90 kg)	Jr	The Hill School	Collegeville, PA
G	20	Matt Staubi	5 ft 8 in (1.73 m)	156 lb (71 kg)	Sr	Darien HS	Rye, NY
F	21	Ethan Norton	6 ft 4 in (1.93 m)	162 lb (73 kg)	RS Fr	The Hill School	Collegeville, PA
F	22	Cam Gregory	6 ft 8 in (2.03 m)	224 lb (102 kg)	Sr	St. Stephen's & St. Agnes School	Waldorf, MD
F	23	Brent Holcombe	6 ft 7 in (2.01 m)	198 lb (90 kg)	Fr	Coral Reef HS	Miami, FL
F	35	Chancellor Barnard	6 ft 4 in (1.93 m)	192 lb (87 kg)	Sr	Glenelg Country School	Columbia, MD
G	41	Ian Langendoerfer	6 ft 5 in (1.96 m)	224 lb (102 kg)	So	Honesdale HS	Honesdale, PA

Head coach

- G.G. Smith (Georgia)

Assistant coach(es)

- Keith Booth (Maryland)
- Trevor Quinn (Goucher)
- Kevin Driscoll (Misericordia)

Legend

- (C) Team captain
- (S) Suspended
- (I) Ineligible
- (W) Walk-on
- Injured
- Current redshirt

Roster
Last update: December 27, 2017

== Schedule and results ==
Date time, TV	Rank^{#}	Opponent^{#}	Result	Record	Site (attendance) city, state
Exhibition
Nov 2, 2017*; 7:00 pm		Elizabethtown	W 83–57		Reitz Arena; Baltimore, MD
Non-conference regular season
Nov 10, 2017*; 8:30 pm, BTN Plus		at No. 19 Northwestern	L 75–79	0–1	Allstate Arena (6,013); Rosemont, IL
Nov 14, 2017*; 7:00 pm, ESPN3		at Fairfield	L 52–64	0–2	Webster Bank Arena (1,231); Bridgeport, CT
Nov 17, 2017*; 7:00 pm		Towson	L 72–95	0–3	Reitz Arena (1,704); Baltimore, MD
Nov 21, 2017*; 7:00 pm		Goucher	W 97–45	1–3	Reitz Arena (436); Baltimore, MD
Nov 26, 2017*; 2:00 pm, ESPN3		at UMass Lowell	L 75–83	1–4	Costello Athletic Center (463); Lowell, MA
Nov 28, 2017*; 7:00 pm		at Dartmouth	L 63–64	1–5	Leede Arena (463); Hanover, NH
Dec 2, 2017*; 4:00 pm, MASN		at Mount St. Mary's	L 75–80 ^{OT}	1–6	Knott Arena (2,480); Emmitsburg, MD
Dec 6, 2017*; 7:00 pm, ACCN Extra		at Florida State	L 71–96	1–7	Donald L. Tucker Civic Center (7,323); Tallahassee, FL
Dec 9, 2017*; 4:00 pm		Binghamton	L 64–77	1–8	Reitz Arena (787); Baltimore, MD
Dec 21, 2017*; 7:00 pm		Drexel	W 66–62	2–8	Reitz Arena (504); Baltimore, MD
Dec 23, 2017*; 12:00 pm, ESPN3		at Memphis	L 71–83	2–9	FedExForum (5,825); Memphis, TN
Patriot League regular season
Dec 29, 2017; 7:00 pm		Navy	W 72–63	3–9 (1–0)	Reitz Arena (623); Baltimore, MD
Jan 2, 2018; 7:00 pm		at Army	L 75–86	3–10 (1–1)	Christl Arena (561); West Point, NY
Jan 5, 2018; 7:00 pm		Boston University	W 68–65	4–10 (2–1)	Reitz Arena (642); Baltimore, MD
Jan 8, 2018; 7:00 pm		at Holy Cross	L 57–64	4–11 (2–2)	Hart Center (1,059); Worcester, MA
Jan 11, 2018; 7:00 pm		at American	L 65–76	4–12 (2–3)	Bender Arena (456); Washington, D.C.
Jan 14, 2018; 2:00 pm		Lafayette	W 83–77	5–12 (3–3)	Reitz Arena (517); Baltimore, MD
Jan 17, 2018; 7:00 pm		Bucknell	L 70–78	5–13 (3–4)	Reitz Arena (1,024); Baltimore, MD
Jan 20, 2018; 2:00 pm		at Colgate	L 72–77	5–14 (3–5)	Cotterell Court (685); Hamilton, NY
Jan 24, 2018; 7:00 pm		at Lehigh	W 91–88 ^{2OT}	6–14 (4–5)	Stabler Arena (758); Bethlehem, PA
Jan 27, 2018; 4:00 pm		Army	W 79–68	7–14 (5–5)	Reitz Arena (742); Baltimore, MD
Jan 31, 2018; 7:00 pm		at Boston University	L 55–64	7–15 (5–6)	Case Gym (704); Boston, MA
Feb 3, 2018; 4:00 pm		Holy Cross	L 57–73	7–16 (5–7)	Reitz Arena (704); Baltimore, MD
Feb 7, 2018; 4:00 pm		American	W 72–69	8–16 (6–7)	Reitz Arena (514); Baltimore, MD
Feb 11, 2018; 12:00 pm, CBSSN		at Lafayette	L 67–84	8–17 (6–8)	Kirby Sports Center (1,548); Easton, PA
Feb 14, 2018; 7:00 pm		at Bucknell	L 53–94	8–18 (6–9)	Sojka Pavilion (2,208); Lewisburg, PA
Feb 18, 2018; 2:00 pm		Colgate	L 47–68	8–19 (6–10)	Reitz Arena (587); Baltimore, MD
Feb 21, 2018; 7:00 pm		Lehigh	L 74–80	8–20 (6–11)	Reitz Arena (612); Baltimore, MD
Feb 24, 2018; 2:00 pm		at Navy	L 56–62	8–21 (6–12)	Alumni Hall (1,942); Annapolis, MD
Patriot League tournament
Feb 27, 2018; 7:00 pm, Stadium	(8)	(9) Army; First Round	W 82–79	9–21	Reitz Arena (413); Baltimore, MD
Mar 1, 2018; 7:00 pm, Stadium	(8)	at (1) Bucknell; Quarterfinals	L 78–83	9–22	Sojka Pavilion (2,492); Lewisburg, PA
*Non-conference game. ^{#}Rankings from AP Poll. (#) Tournament seedings in parentheses. All times are in Eastern Time.
