= 2017–18 Army Black Knights men's basketball team =

American college basketball season

2017–18 Army Black Knights men's basketball

Bulldog Bash champions
- Conference: Patriot League
- Record: 13–17 (6–12 Patriot)
- Head coach: Jimmy Allen (2nd season)
- Assistant coaches: Brandon Linton; Drew Adams; Ben Wilkins; Zak Boisvert
- Home arena: Christl Arena

2017–18 Patriot League men's basketball standings
	Conf.				Overall
Team	W		L	PCT	W		L	PCT
Bucknell †	16	–	2	.889	25	–	10	.714
Colgate	12	–	6	.667	19	–	14	.576
Navy	11	–	7	.611	20	–	12	.625
Lehigh	11	–	7	.611	16	–	14	.533
Boston University	10	–	8	.556	15	–	16	.484
Holy Cross	8	–	10	.444	12	–	19	.387
Lafayette	7	–	11	.389	10	–	21	.323
Army	6	–	12	.333	13	–	17	.433
Loyola (MD)	6	–	12	.333	9	–	22	.290
American	3	–	15	.167	6	–	24	.200
† 2018 Patriot League tournament winner

The 2017–18 Army Black Knights men's basketball team represented the United States Military Academy during the 2017–18 NCAA Division I men's basketball season. The Black Knights, led by second-year head coach Jimmy Allen, played their home games at Christl Arena in West Point, New York as members of the Patriot League. They finished the season 13–17, 6–12 in Patriot League play to finish in a tie for eighth place. They lost in the first round of the Patriot League tournament to Loyola (MD).

== Previous season ==
The Black Knights finished the 2016–17 season 13–19, 6–12 in Patriot League play to finish in eighth place. As the No. 8 seed in the Patriot League tournament, they defeated American in the first round before losing to top-seeded Bucknell in the quarterfinals.

== Offseason ==
=== 2017 recruiting class ===
College recruiting information
Name	Hometown	School	Height	Weight	Commit date
Josh Caldwell; PG	Columbia, SC	Heathwood Hall Episcopal School	6 ft 1 in (1.85 m)	N/A	Jul 26, 2016
Josh Caldwell; PG	Recruit ratings: Scout: Rivals: (NR)				
John Scully; PG	Flower Mound, TX	Flower Mound Episcopal School	6 ft 2 in (1.88 m)	N/A	Aug 13, 2016
John Scully; PG	Recruit ratings: Scout: Rivals: (NR)				
Overall recruit ranking:
Note: In many cases, Scout, Rivals, 247Sports, On3, and ESPN may conflict in their listings of height and weight.; In these cases, the average was taken. ESPN grades are on a 100-point scale.; Sources: "2017 Team Ranking". Rivals.

== Roster ==
2017–18 Army Black Knights men's basketball team
Players
Coaches

Pos.	#	Name	Height	Weight	Year	Previous school	Hometown
F	0	Babacar Thiombane	6 ft 7 in (2.01 m)	198 lb (90 kg)	Fr	Fairfax HS	Los Angeles, CA
G	1	Jordan Fox	6 ft 6 in (1.98 m)	184 lb (83 kg)	Jr	Jackson County HS	Jackson County, KY
G	2	Cayne Edwards	6 ft 4 in (1.93 m)	220 lb (100 kg)	Jr	Samuel Clemens HS	Schertz, TX
G	3	Tommy Funk	6 ft 0 in (1.83 m)	181 lb (82 kg)	Sr	Archbishop Wood HS	Warrington, PA
G	5	Ben Mammel	6 ft 0 in (1.83 m)	183 lb (83 kg)	So	Wyoming HS	Cincinnati, OH
G/F	10	Jacob Kessler	6 ft 4 in (1.93 m)	190 lb (86 kg)	Jr	Mills E. Godwin HS	Richmond, VA
G	11	Tucker Blackwell	6 ft 1 in (1.85 m)	173 lb (78 kg)	Fr	Bloomington HS North	Bloomington, IN
F	12	Nick Finke	6 ft 7 in (2.01 m)	202 lb (92 kg)	Fr	Champaign Central HS	Champaign, IL
F/C	14	Matt Wilson	6 ft 9 in (2.06 m)	235 lb (107 kg)	So	Campbell County HS	Alexandria, KY
G	15	Mark Madden	6 ft 5 in (1.96 m)	201 lb (91 kg)	Fr	St. Joseph HS	South Bend, IN
G	21	Will Culliton	6 ft 2 in (1.88 m)	177 lb (80 kg)	Fr	Breck School	Wayzata, MN
G	24	Jason Houle	6 ft 5 in (1.96 m)	207 lb (94 kg)	Jr	Father Gabriel Richard HS	Plymouth, MI
F	25	Luke Morrison	6 ft 6 in (1.98 m)	218 lb (99 kg)	Sr	Northside Christian Academy	Charlotte, NC
F	33	Cam Fuller	6 ft 8 in (2.03 m)	201 lb (91 kg)	Fr	William S. Hart HS	Santa Clarita, CA
C	34	John Miller	6 ft 9 in (2.06 m)	225 lb (102 kg)	Jr	New Albany HS	New Albany, NY
F	35	Alex King	6 ft 8 in (2.03 m)	197 lb (89 kg)	Fr	Columbus North HS	Columbus, IN
F	43	Keeston Smith	6 ft 5 in (1.96 m)	168 lb (76 kg)	Fr	La Salle Catholic College Prep	Oregon City, OR
F	44	Mark Pollack	6 ft 6 in (1.98 m)	218 lb (99 kg)	Sr	Charlotte Catholic HS	Charlotte, NC
F	45	Adam Roe	6 ft 5 in (1.96 m)	210 lb (95 kg)	Jr	West Platte HS	Weston, MO
F	51	Parker Fennema	6 ft 6 in (1.98 m)	215 lb (98 kg)	Jr	Sanderson HS	Raleigh, NC
G/F	52	John Emezie	6 ft 6 in (1.98 m)	215 lb (98 kg)	Jr	Marvin Ridge HS	Waxhaw, NC
G	53	Lance Lawson	6 ft 2 in (1.88 m)	169 lb (77 kg)	So	Ardrey Kell HS	Charlotte, NC

Head coach

- Jimmy Allen (Emory & Henry)

Assistant coach(es)

- Brandon Linton (Clarkson)
- Drew Adams (Chicago)
- Ben Wilkins (NC State)
- Zak Boisvert (Fordham)

Legend

- (C) Team captain
- (S) Suspended
- (I) Ineligible
- (W) Walk-on
- Injured
- Current redshirt

Roster
Last update: December 8, 2017

== Schedule and results ==
Date time, TV	Rank^{#}	Opponent^{#}	Result	Record	Site (attendance) city, state
Non-conference regular season
Nov 10, 2017*; 7:00 pm		at Hofstra	L 74–77	0–1	Mack Sports Complex (2,703); Hempstead, NY
Nov 14, 2017*; 7:00 pm		John Jay	W 92–43	1–1	Christl Arena (454); West Point, NY
Nov 18, 2017*; 7:00 pm, ESPN3		at Marist	W 94–73	2–1	McCann Field House (1,339); Poughkeepsie, NY
Nov 21, 2017*; 7:00 pm		Columbia	W 88–78	3–1	Christl Arena (683); West Point, NY
Nov 27, 2017*; 7:00 pm		at Niagara	L 71–77	3–2	Gallagher Center (978); Lewiston, NY
Dec 1, 2017*; 5:00 pm		vs. UMBC; Bulldog Bash semifinals	W 81–70	4–2	McAlister Field House (609); Charleston, SC
Dec 2, 2017*; 5:00 pm		vs. Marist; Bulldog Bash finals	W 82–75	5–2	McAlister Field House (673); Charleston, SC
Dec 6, 2017*; 7:00 pm, ESPN3		at Binghamton	L 66–71	5–3	Binghamton University Events Center (1,785); Vestal, NY
Dec 8, 2017*; 7:00 pm, ACCN Extra		at Wake Forest	L 80–109	5–4	LJVM Coliseum (2,978); Winston-Salem, NC
Dec 12, 2017*; 7:00 pm		at St. Francis Brooklyn	W 76–64	6–4	Generoso Pope Athletic Complex (475); Brooklyn, NY
Dec 17, 2017*; 1:30 pm		vs. Air Force; Madison Square Garden Holiday Festival	W 79–54	7–4	Madison Square Garden (9,515); New York City, NY
Patriot League regular season
Dec 29, 2017; 7:00 pm		at Boston University	L 82–90	7–5 (0–1)	Case Gym (503); Boston, MA
Jan 2, 2018; 7:00 pm		Loyola (MD)	W 86–75	8–5 (1–1)	Christl Arena (561); West Point, NY
Jan 5, 2018; 7:00 pm		Bucknell	L 66–83	8–6 (1–2)	Christl Arena (1,073); West Point, NY
Jan 8, 2018; 7:00 pm		at American	W 58–54	9–6 (2–2)	Bender Arena (303); Washington, D.C.
Jan 11, 2018; 12:00 pm		Lafayette	W 81–71	10–6 (3–2)	Christl Arena (1,342); West Point, NY
Jan 14, 2018; 2:30 pm, CBSSN		at Navy	W 64–62	11–6 (4–2)	Alumni Hall (5,710); Annapolis, MD
Jan 17, 2018; 7:00 pm		at Holy Cross	L 66–70	11–7 (4–3)	Hart Center (1,134); Worcester, MA
Jan 20, 2018; 2:00 pm		Lehigh	W 93–81	12–7 (5–3)	Christl Arena (1,514); West Point, NY
Jan 24, 2018; 7:00 pm, Stadium		Colgate	L 78–81	12–8 (5–4)	Christl Arena (552); West Point, NY
Jan 27, 2018; 4:00 pm		at Loyola (MD)	L 68–79	12–9 (5–5)	Reitz Arena (742); Baltimore, MD
Jan 31, 2018; 7:00 pm		at Bucknell	L 71–83 ^{OT}	12–10 (5–6)	Sojka Pavilion (2,243); Lewisburg, PA
Feb 3, 2018; 3:00 pm		American	W 82–70	13–10 (6–6)	Christl Arena (835); West Point, NY
Feb 7, 2018; 7:00 pm		at Lafayette	L 54–81	13–11 (6–7)	Kirby Sports Center (877); Easton, PA
Feb 10, 2018; 1:30 pm, CBSSN		Navy	L 59–68	13–12 (6–8)	Christl Arena (5,181); West Point, NY
Feb 14, 2018; 7:00 pm		Holy Cross	L 65–70	13–13 (6–9)	Christl Arena (601); West Point, NY
Feb 17, 2018; 7:00 pm		at Lehigh	L 53–84	13–14 (6–10)	Stabler Arena (1,002); Bethlehem, PA
Feb 21, 2018; 7:00 pm		at Colgate	L 83–87	13–15 (6–11)	Cotterell Court (502); Hamilton, NY
Feb 24, 2018; 2:00 pm		Boston University	L 59–61	13–16 (6–12)	Christl Arena (992); West Point, NY
Patriot League tournament
Feb 27, 2018; 7:00 pm, Stadium	(9)	at (8) Loyola (MD); First round	L 79–82	13–17	Reitz Arena (413); Baltimore
*Non-conference game. ^{#}Rankings from AP Poll. (#) Tournament seedings in parentheses. All times are in Eastern Time.
