= 2017–18 Lehigh Mountain Hawks men's basketball team =

American college basketball season

2017–18 Lehigh Mountain Hawks men's basketball
- Conference: Patriot League
- Record: 16–14 (11–7 Patriot)
- Head coach: Brett Reed (11th season)
- Assistant coaches: Antoni Wyche; Harry Morra; Noel Hightower
- Home arena: Stabler Arena

2017–18 Patriot League men's basketball standings
	Conf.				Overall
Team	W		L	PCT	W		L	PCT
Bucknell †	16	–	2	.889	25	–	10	.714
Colgate	12	–	6	.667	19	–	14	.576
Navy	11	–	7	.611	20	–	12	.625
Lehigh	11	–	7	.611	16	–	14	.533
Boston University	10	–	8	.556	15	–	16	.484
Holy Cross	8	–	10	.444	12	–	19	.387
Lafayette	7	–	11	.389	10	–	21	.323
Army	6	–	12	.333	13	–	17	.433
Loyola (MD)	6	–	12	.333	9	–	22	.290
American	3	–	15	.167	6	–	24	.200
† 2018 Patriot League tournament winner

The 2017–18 Lehigh Mountain Hawks men's basketball team represented Lehigh University during the 2017–18 NCAA Division I men's basketball season. The Mountain Hawks, led by 11th-year head coach Brett Reed, played their home games at Stabler Arena in Bethlehem, Pennsylvania as members of the Patriot League. They finished the season 16–14, 11–7 in Patriot League play to finish in a tie for third place. They lost in the quarterfinals of the Patriot League tournament to Boston University.

== Previous season ==
The Mountain Hawks finished the 2016–17 season 20–12, 12–6 in Patriot League play to finish in a tie for second place. As the No. 3 seed in the Patriot League tournament, they defeated Colgate and Boston University before losing to Bucknell in the championship game. Despite having 20 wins, they did not participate in a postseason tournament.

== Offseason ==
=== 2017 recruiting class ===
College recruiting information
Name	Hometown	School	Height	Weight	Commit date
Marques Wilson #47 SG	Edmond, OK	Edmond North High School	6 ft 4 in (1.93 m)	N/A	
Marques Wilson #47 SG	Recruit ratings: Scout: Rivals: (78)				
Caleb Bennett; SG	St. Joseph, MO	Lafayette High School	6 ft 4 in (1.93 m)	185 lb (84 kg)	
Caleb Bennett; SG	Recruit ratings: Scout: Rivals: (NR)				
Overall recruit ranking:
Note: In many cases, Scout, Rivals, 247Sports, On3, and ESPN may conflict in their listings of height and weight.; In these cases, the average was taken. ESPN grades are on a 100-point scale.; Sources: "2017 Team Ranking". Rivals.

== Roster ==
2017–18 Lehigh Mountain Hawks men's basketball team
Players
Coaches

Pos.	#	Name	Height	Weight	Year	Previous school	Hometown
G	1	Kahron Ross	5 ft 11 in (1.8 m)	160 lb (73 kg)	Sr	Jonesboro HS	Jonesboro, AR
G	2	Kyle Leufroy	6 ft 3 in (1.91 m)	195 lb (88 kg)	Jr	Benicia HS; Prolific Prep	Pasadena, CA
G	4	Caleb Bennett	6 ft 5 in (1.96 m)	190 lb (86 kg)	Fr	Lafayette HS	St. Joseph, MO
G	5	Lance Tejada	6 ft 2 in (1.88 m)	190 lb (86 kg)	Sr	Blanche Ely HS; East Carolina	Miramar, FL
F	10	Ed Porter	6 ft 7 in (2.01 m)	215 lb (98 kg)	So	Eastside HS	Hawthorne, FL
G	11	Jordan Cohen	6 ft 1 in (1.85 m)	185 lb (84 kg)	So	Campbell Hall HS	Tarzana, CA
C	13	James Karnik	6 ft 9 in (2.06 m)	225 lb (102 kg)	Fr	Orangeville Prep	Surrey, BC
G	20	Marques Wilson	6 ft 4 in (1.93 m)	185 lb (84 kg)	Fr	Edmond North HS	Edmond, OK
F/C	21	Jack Lieb	6 ft 10 in (2.08 m)	245 lb (111 kg)	So	Brewster Academy	Deerfield, IL
F	31	Pat Andree	6 ft 8 in (2.03 m)	225 lb (102 kg)	So	Christian Brothers Academy	Colts Neck, NJ
C	40	Josh Wolf	6 ft 10 in (2.08 m)	225 lb (102 kg)	So	Williston Northampton HS	Glencoe, IL
F	42	Shane Acoveno	6 ft 6 in (1.98 m)	200 lb (91 kg)	Fr	Delaware Valley HS	Milford, PA
C	55	Caleb Sedore	6 ft 11 in (2.11 m)	230 lb (104 kg)	Jr	Pulaski HS	Pulaski, NY

Head coach

- Brett Reed (Wayne State (MI))

Assistant coach(es)

- Antoni Wyche (Notre Dame)
- Harry Morra (DeSales)
- Noel Hightower (Chestnut Hill)

Legend

- (C) Team captain
- (S) Suspended
- (I) Ineligible
- (W) Walk-on
- Injured
- Current redshirt

Roster
Last update: December 14, 2017

== Schedule and results ==
Date time, TV	Rank^{#}	Opponent^{#}	Result	Record	Site (attendance) city, state
Non-conference regular season
Nov 11, 2017*; 7:00 pm, ESPN3		at Marist	W 84–76	1–0	McCann Field House (1,387); Poughkeepsie, NY
Nov 14, 2017*; 7:00 pm		Monmouth	L 72–80	1–1	Stabler Arena (779); Bethlehem, PA
Nov 17, 2017*; 7:00 pm		Siena	W 91–90	2–1	Stabler Arena (767); Bethlehem, PA
Nov 19, 2017*; 2:00 pm		Eastern	W 95–70	3–1	Stabler Arena (643); Bethlehem, PA
Nov 22, 2017*; 10:00 pm, P12N		at No. 10 USC	L 63–88	3–2	Galen Center (1,387); Los Angeles, CA
Nov 25, 2017*; 2:00 pm, ACCN Extra		at Pittsburgh	L 68–80	3–3	Petersen Events Center (3,317); Pittsburgh, PA
Nov 29, 2017*; 8:00 pm, NBCSP+		at Princeton	W 85–76	4–3	Jadwin Gymnasium (1,292); Princeton, NJ
Dec 2, 2017*; 12:00 pm, ACCN Extra		at No. 18 Virginia	L 54–75	4–4	John Paul Jones Arena (13,594); Charlottesville, VA
Dec 6, 2017*; 7:00 pm		Yale	L 77–86	4–5	Stabler Arena (776); Bethlehem, PA
Dec 9, 2017*; 2:00 pm		Mount St. Mary's	W 75–60	5–5	Stabler Arena (694); Bethlehem, PA
Dec 21, 2017*; 7:00 pm		at Saint Francis (PA)	L 70–84	5–6	DeGol Arena (672); Loretto, PA
Patriot League regular season
Dec 29, 2017; 7:00 pm		at Lafayette	W 79–74	6–6 (1–0)	Kirby Sports Center (1,673); Easton, PA
Jan 2, 2018; 7:00 pm		at Navy	L 66–78	6–7 (1–1)	Alumni Hall (632); Annapolis, MD
Jan 5, 2018; 7:00 pm, SE TV2		Holy Cross	W 83–77	7–7 (2–1)	Stabler Arena (814); Bethlehem, PA
Jan 8, 2018; 7:00 pm		at Boston University	L 81–92	7–8 (2–2)	Case Gym (403); Boston, MA
Jan 11, 2018; 7:00 pm		at Bucknell	L 65–78	7–9 (2–3)	Sojka Pavilion (2,404); Lewisburg, PA
Jan 14, 2018; 2:00 pm, SE TV2		American	W 76–66	8–9 (3–3)	Stabler Arena (1,358); Bethlehem, PA
Jan 17, 2018; 7:00 pm		Colgate	L 72–76	8–10 (3–4)	Stabler Arena (1,024); Bethlehem, PA
Jan 20, 2018; 2:00 pm		at Army	L 81–93	8–11 (3–5)	Christl Arena (1,514); West Point, NY
Jan 24, 2018; 7:00 pm, SE TV2		Loyola (MD)	L 88–91 ^{2OT}	8–12 (3–6)	Stabler Arena (758); Bethlehem, PA
Jan 27, 2018; 7:00 pm, SE TV2		Navy	L 75–77	8–13 (3–7)	Stabler Arena (1,614); Bethlehem, PA
Jan 29, 2018; 7:00 pm, CBSSN		at Holy Cross	W 71–67	9–13 (4–7)	Hart Center (2,052); Worcester, MA
Feb 3, 2018; 2:00 pm, SE TV2		Boston University	W 80–75	10–13 (5–7)	Stabler Arena (1,214); Bethlehem, PA
Feb 5, 2018; 7:00 pm, CBSSN		Bucknell	W 92–89 ^{OT}	11–13 (6–7)	Stabler Arena (1,126); Bethlehem, PA
Feb 10, 2018; 2:00 pm, NBCSW		at American	W 80–78	12–13 (7–7)	Bender Arena (705); Washington, D.C.
Feb 14, 2018; 7:00 pm		at Colgate	W 88–78	13–13 (8–7)	Cotterell Court (312); Hamilton, NY
Feb 17, 2018; 7:00 pm, SE TV2		Army	W 84–53	14–13 (9–7)	Stabler Arena (1,002); Bethlehem, PA
Feb 21, 2018; 7:00 pm		at Loyola (MD)	W 80–74	15–13 (10–7)	Reitz Arena (612); Baltimore, MD
Feb 24, 2018; 7:30 pm, SE TV2		Lafayette	W 79–64	16–13 (11–7)	Stabler Arena (2,240); Bethlehem, PA
Patriot League tournament
Mar 1, 2018; 7:00 pm, Stadium	(4)	(5) Boston University; Quarterfinals	L 82–88	16–14	Stabler Arena (1,491); Bethlehem, PA
*Non-conference game. ^{#}Rankings from AP Poll. (#) Tournament seedings in parentheses. All times are in Eastern Time.
