= 2018 Patriot League men's basketball tournament =

- Classification: Division I
- Season: 2017–18
- Teams: 10
- Site: Campus sites
- Champions: Bucknell (6th title)
- Winning coach: Nathan Davis (2nd title)
- MVP: Stephen Brown (Bucknell)
- Attendance: 16,325
- Television: PLN, CBSSN

2017–18 Patriot League men's basketball standings
	Conf.				Overall
Team	W		L	PCT	W		L	PCT
Bucknell †	16	–	2	.889	25	–	10	.714
Colgate	12	–	6	.667	19	–	14	.576
Navy	11	–	7	.611	20	–	12	.625
Lehigh	11	–	7	.611	16	–	14	.533
Boston University	10	–	8	.556	15	–	16	.484
Holy Cross	8	–	10	.444	12	–	19	.387
Lafayette	7	–	11	.389	10	–	21	.323
Army	6	–	12	.333	13	–	17	.433
Loyola (MD)	6	–	12	.333	9	–	22	.290
American	3	–	15	.167	6	–	24	.200
† 2018 Patriot League tournament winner

The 2018 Patriot League men's basketball tournament was the postseason men's basketball tournament for the Patriot League for the 2017–18 NCAA Division I men's basketball season. It was held on February 27, March 1, 4, and 7, 2018 with the higher seed in each matchup hosting at their respective campus sites.

Bucknell defeated Colgate in the championship game to win the tournament and received the conference's automatic bid to the NCAA tournament.

== Seeds ==
All 10 Patriot League teams were eligible for the tournament. The top six teams received a first round bye. Teams were seeded by record within the conference, with a tiebreaker system to seed teams with identical conference records.

With a win over Loyola (MD) on February 14, 2018, Bucknell clinched the Patriot League regular season championship for the seventh time in the previous eight years and earned the No. 1 seed.

Seed	School	Conf	Tiebreaker 1	Tiebreaker 2	Tiebreaker 3	Tiebreaker 4	Tiebreaker 5
1	Bucknell	16–2					
2	Colgate	12–6					
3	Navy	11–7	2–0 vs Lehigh				
4	Lehigh	11–7	0–2 vs Navy				
5	Boston University	10–8					
6	Holy Cross	8–10					
7	Lafayette	7–11					
8	Loyola (MD)	6–12	1–1 vs Army	0–2 vs Bucknell	0–2 vs Colgate	2–2 vs Navy/Lehigh	1–1 vs BU
9	Army	6–12	1–1 vs Loyola	0–2 vs Bucknell	0–2 vs Colgate	2–2 vs Navy/Lehigh	0–2 vs BU
10	American	3–15					

== Schedule ==
Game	Time*	Matchup	Score	Attendance	Television
First round – Tuesday, February 27
1	7:00 pm	No. 9 Army at No. 8 Loyola (MD)	79–82	413	PLN
2	7:30 pm	No. 10 American at No. 7 Lafayette	86–93	1,774	PLN
Quarterfinals – Thursday, March 1
3	7:00 pm	No. 8 Loyola (MD) at No. 1 Bucknell	78–83	2,492	PLN
4	7:00 pm	No. 5 Boston University at No. 4 Lehigh	88–82	1,491	PLN
5	7:00 pm	No. 6 Holy Cross at No. 3 Navy	81–65	667	PLN
6	7:00 pm	No. 7 Lafayette at No. 2 Colgate	54–76	1,338	PLN
Semifinals – Sunday, March 4
7	12:00 pm	No. 6 Holy Cross at No. 2 Colgate	55–62	1,279	CBSSN
8	2:00 pm	No. 5 Boston University at No. 1 Bucknell	59–90	2,925	CBSSN
Championship – Wednesday, March 7
9	7:30 pm	No. 2 Colgate at No. 1 Bucknell	54–83	3,946	CBSSN
*Game times in ET. Rankings denote tournament seeding. All games hosted by higher-seeded team.

== Bracket ==
First round February 27; Patriot League Network
8	Loyola (MD)	82
9	Army	79
7	Lafayette	93
10	American	86

Quarterfinals; March 1 Patriot League Network
1	Bucknell	83
8	Loyola (MD)	78
4	Lehigh	82
5	Boston University	88
2	Colgate	76
7	Lafayette	54
3	Navy	65
6	Holy Cross	81

Semifinals; March 4 CBS Sports Network
1	Bucknell	90
5	Boston University	59
2	Colgate	62
6	Holy Cross	55

Championship; March 7 CBS Sports Network
1	Bucknell	83
2	Colgate	54
