= 2017–18 Boston University Terriers men's basketball team =

American college basketball season

2017–18 Boston University Terriers men's basketball
- Conference: Patriot League
- Record: 15–16 (10–8 Patriot)
- Head coach: Joe Jones (7th season)
- Assistant coaches: Curtis Wilson; Walt Corbean; Jack Perri
- Home arena: Case Gym

2017–18 Patriot League men's basketball standings
	Conf.				Overall
Team	W		L	PCT	W		L	PCT
Bucknell †	16	–	2	.889	25	–	10	.714
Colgate	12	–	6	.667	19	–	14	.576
Navy	11	–	7	.611	20	–	12	.625
Lehigh	11	–	7	.611	16	–	14	.533
Boston University	10	–	8	.556	15	–	16	.484
Holy Cross	8	–	10	.444	12	–	19	.387
Lafayette	7	–	11	.389	10	–	21	.323
Army	6	–	12	.333	13	–	17	.433
Loyola (MD)	6	–	12	.333	9	–	22	.290
American	3	–	15	.167	6	–	24	.200
† 2018 Patriot League tournament winner

The 2017–18 Boston University Terriers men's basketball team represented Boston University during the 2017–18 NCAA Division I men's basketball season. The Terriers, led by seventh-year head coach Joe Jones, played their home games at Case Gym as members of the Patriot League. They finished the season 15–16, 10–8 in Patriot League play to finish in fifth place. In the Patriot League tournament, they defeated Lehigh in the quarterfinals before losing to Bucknell in the semifinals.

== Previous season ==
The Terriers finished the 2016–17 season 18–14, 12–6 in Patriot League play to finish in a tie for second place. As the No. 2 seed in the Patriot League tournament, they defeated Loyola (MD) in the quarterfinals before losing to Lehigh in double overtime in the semifinals.

== Offseason ==
=== 2017 recruiting class ===
College recruiting information
Name	Hometown	School	Height	Weight	Commit date
Sukhmail Mathon; PF	Dallas, PA	Holderness School	6 ft 9 in (2.06 m)	220 lb (100 kg)	Aug 8, 2016
Sukhmail Mathon; PF	Recruit ratings: Scout: Rivals: (NR)				
Overall recruit ranking:
Note: In many cases, Scout, Rivals, 247Sports, On3, and ESPN may conflict in their listings of height and weight.; In these cases, the average was taken. ESPN grades are on a 100-point scale.; Sources: "2017 Team Ranking". Rivals.

== Roster ==
2017–18 Boston University Terriers men's basketball team
Players
Coaches

Pos.	#	Name	Height	Weight	Year	Previous school	Hometown
G	0	Eric Johnson	6 ft 2 in (1.88 m)	195 lb (88 kg)	Sr	Carlisle School	Durham, NC
F	1	Nick Havener	6 ft 8 in (2.03 m)	225 lb (102 kg)	Sr	Riverview HS	Sarasota, FL
F	2	Tyler Scanlon	6 ft 7 in (2.01 m)	215 lb (98 kg)	So	Westfield HS	Chantilly, VA
G/F	5	Walter Whyte	6 ft 6 in (1.98 m)	210 lb (95 kg)	RS Fr	St. Luke's School	New Haven, CT
G	13	Will Goff	6 ft 3 in (1.91 m)	190 lb (86 kg)	Sr	Desert Mountain HS	Scottsdale, AZ
G	14	Andrew Petcash	6 ft 4 in (1.93 m)	200 lb (91 kg)	Fr	Pine-Richland HS	Pittsburgh, PA
G	15	Cheddi Mosely	6 ft 3 in (1.91 m)	195 lb (88 kg)	Sr	St. Anthony HS	Jersey City, NJ
G	21	Cedric Hankerson	6 ft 5 in (1.96 m)	225 lb (102 kg)	Sr	Coral Reef HS	Miami, FL
G	23	Destin Barnes	6 ft 6 in (1.98 m)	210 lb (95 kg)	So	Don Bosco Prep HS	Chicago, IL
G	24	Kamali Chambers	5 ft 11 in (1.8 m)	180 lb (82 kg)	Jr	Brewster Academy	Golden Valley, MN
G	30	Javante McCoy	6 ft 5 in (1.96 m)	180 lb (82 kg)	Fr	Phillips Exeter Academy	Milwaukee, WI
C	41	Sukhmail Mathon	6 ft 10 in (2.08 m)	225 lb (102 kg)	Fr	Holderness School	Shavertown, PA
F	51	Max Mahoney	6 ft 8 in (2.03 m)	235 lb (107 kg)	So	Ridge HS	Basking Ridge, NJ

Head coach

- Joe Jones (SUNY–Oswego)

Assistant coach(es)

- Curtis Wilson (Adelphi)
- Walt Corbean (Northern Kentucky)
- Jack Perri (Bentley)

Legend

- (C) Team captain
- (S) Suspended
- (I) Ineligible
- (W) Walk-on
- Injured
- Current redshirt

Roster
Last update: December 14, 2017

== Schedule and results ==
Date time, TV	Rank^{#}	Opponent^{#}	Result	Record	Site (attendance) city, state
Exhibition
Oct 27, 2017*; 7:00 pm		at Vermont; Exhibition for hurricane relief	L 66–87		Patrick Gym (1,446); Burlington, VT
Non-conference regular season
Nov 10, 2017*; 8:00 pm		Northeastern	L 59–65	0–1	Case Gym (1,535); Boston, MA
Nov 13, 2017*; 7:00 pm		Albany	L 74–88	0–2	Case Gym (444); Boston, MA
Nov 19, 2017*; 6:00 pm, SNY		at UConn	L 66–85	0–3	XL Center (6,308); Hartford, CT
Nov 22, 2017*; 2:00 pm		at Maine	W 78–69	1–3	Cross Insurance Center (874); Bangor, ME
Nov 26, 2017*; 4:00 pm		Wheaton (MA)	W 83–48	2–3	Case Gym (339); Boston, MA
Nov 29, 2017*; 7:15 pm, ESPN3		at New Hampshire	W 70–69	3–3	Lundholm Gym (317); Durham, NH
Dec 5, 2017*; 7:00 pm, RSN		at Miami (FL)	L 54–69	3–4	Watsco Center (6,893); Coral Gables, FL
Dec 8, 2017*; 7:00 pm		at Bethune–Cookman	W 90–87	4–4	Moore Gymnasium (816); Daytona Beach, FL
Dec 13, 2017*; 5:00 pm, ESPN3		at UMass Lowell	L 82–87	4–5	Costello Athletic Center (1,475); Lowell, MA
Dec 17, 2017*; 1:00 pm		Elon	L 69–77	4–6	Case Gym (589); Boston, MA
Dec 21, 2017*; 7:00 pm, NESN+		at Harvard	L 63–74	4–7	Lavietes Pavilion (1,175); Boston, MA
Patriot League regular season
Dec 29, 2017; 7:00 pm		Army	W 90–82	5–7 (1–0)	Case Gym (503); Boston, MA
Jan 2, 2018; 7:00 pm		at Bucknell	W 84–79	6–7 (2–0)	Sojka Pavilion (2,018); Lewisburg, PA
Jan 5, 2018; 7:00 pm		at Loyola (MD)	L 65–68	6–8 (2–1)	Reitz Arena (642); Baltimore, MD
Jan 8, 2018; 7:00 pm		Lehigh	W 92–81	7–8 (3–1)	Case Gym (403); Boston, MA
Jan 11, 2018; 7:00 pm, Stadium		Colgate	W 72–58	8–8 (4–1)	Case Gym (387); Boston, MA
Jan 14, 2018; 1:00 pm		at Holy Cross	W 54–40	9–8 (5–1)	Hart Center (1,561); Worcester, MA
Jan 17, 2018; 7:00 pm		American	L 58–69	9–9 (5–2)	Case Gym (705); Boston, MA
Jan 20, 2018; 2:00 pm		at Navy	W 75–68	10–9 (6–2)	Alumni Hall (1,942); Annapolis, MD
Jan 24, 2018; 7:00 pm		at Lafayette	W 75–72	11–9 (7–2)	Kirby Sports Center (1,144); Easton, PA
Jan 28, 2018; 12:00 pm, CBSSN		Bucknell	L 79–91	11–10 (7–3)	Case Gym (900); Boston, MA
Jan 31, 2018; 7:00 pm		Loyola (MD)	W 64–55	12–10 (8–3)	Case Gym (704); Boston, MA
Feb 3, 2018; 2:00 pm		at Lehigh	L 75–80	12–11 (8–4)	Stabler Arena (1,214); Bethlehem, PA
Feb 7, 2018; 7:00 pm		at Colgate	L 60–74	12–12 (8–5)	Cotterell Court (959); Hamilton, NY
Feb 10, 2018; 12:00 pm		Holy Cross	L 62–73	12–13 (8–6)	Case Gym (571); Boston, MA
Feb 14, 2018; 7:00 pm		at American	L 56–60	12–14 (8–7)	Bender Arena (505); Washington, D.C.
Feb 17, 2018; 12:00 pm		Navy	L 48–62	12–15 (8–8)	Case Gym (1,404); Boston, MA
Feb 21, 2018; 7:00 pm		Lafayette	W 81–65	13–15 (9–8)	Case Gym (540); Boston, MA
Feb 24, 2018; 2:00 pm		at Army	W 61–59	14–15 (10–8)	Christl Arena (992); West Point, NY
Patriot League tournament
Mar 1, 2018; 7:00 pm, Stadium	(5)	at (4) Lehigh; Quarterfinals	W 88–82	15–15	Stabler Arena (1,491); Bethlehem, PA
Mar 4, 2018; 2:00 pm, CBSSN	(5)	at (1) Bucknell; Semifinals	L 59–90	15–16	Sojka Pavilion (2,925); Lewisburg, PA
*Non-conference game. ^{#}Rankings from AP Poll. (#) Tournament seedings in parentheses. All times are in Eastern Time.
