= 2017–18 Bucknell Bison men's basketball team =

American college basketball season

2017–18 Bucknell Bison men's basketball

Patriot League tournament champions Patriot League regular season champions

NCAA tournament, First Round
- Conference: Patriot League
- Record: 25–10 (16–2 Patriot)
- Head coach: Nathan Davis (3rd season)
- Assistant coaches: Paul Harrison; John Griffin; Joe Meehan
- Home arena: Sojka Pavilion

2017–18 Patriot League men's basketball standings
	Conf.				Overall
Team	W		L	PCT	W		L	PCT
Bucknell †	16	–	2	.889	25	–	10	.714
Colgate	12	–	6	.667	19	–	14	.576
Navy	11	–	7	.611	20	–	12	.625
Lehigh	11	–	7	.611	16	–	14	.533
Boston University	10	–	8	.556	15	–	16	.484
Holy Cross	8	–	10	.444	12	–	19	.387
Lafayette	7	–	11	.389	10	–	21	.323
Army	6	–	12	.333	13	–	17	.433
Loyola (MD)	6	–	12	.333	9	–	22	.290
American	3	–	15	.167	6	–	24	.200
† 2018 Patriot League tournament winner

The 2017–18 Bucknell Bison men's basketball team represented Bucknell University during the 2017–18 NCAA Division I men's basketball season. The Bison, led by third-year head coach Nathan Davis, played their home games at Sojka Pavilion in Lewisburg, Pennsylvania as members of the Patriot League. They finished the season 25–10, 16–2 in Patriot League to win the Patriot League regular season championship. They defeated Loyola (MD), Boston University, and Colgate to win the Patriot League tournament championship. As a result, they received the Patriot League's automatic bid to the NCAA tournament, where they lost in the first round to Michigan State.

== Previous season ==
The Bison finished the 2016–17 season 23–8, 15–3 in Patriot League play to win the regular season championship, their third straight title and sixth in seven years. In the Patriot League tournament, they defeated Army, Navy, and Lehigh to win the tournament championship. As a result, the Bison received the conference's automatic bid to the NCAA tournament as the No. 13 seed in the West region. There, they lost in the first round to West Virginia.

== Offseason ==
=== 2017 recruiting class ===
College recruiting
Name	Hometown	School	Height	Weight	Commit date
Jimmy Sotos; PG	Elk Grove Village, IL	Conant	6 ft 3 in (1.91 m)	180 lb (82 kg)	
Jimmy Sotos; PG	Recruit ratings: No ratings found				
John Meeks; SF	Burlington, NC	The Burlington School	6 ft 6 in (1.98 m)	240 lb (110 kg)	
John Meeks; SF	Recruit ratings: No ratings found				
Paul Newman; F	Philadelphia, Pa	St. Andrews School	6 ft 9 in (2.06 m)	240 lb (110 kg)	
Paul Newman; F	Recruit ratings: No ratings found				
Overall recruit ranking:
Note: In many cases, Scout, Rivals, 247Sports, On3, and ESPN may conflict in their listings of height and weight.; In these cases, the average was taken. ESPN grades are on a 100-point scale.; Sources: "2017 Team Ranking". Rivals.

== Preseason ==
In a preseason poll of league head coaches and sports information directors, Bucknell was picked to win the Patriot League, receiving all 18 first-place votes. Senior center Nana Foulland was named the preseason Patriot League Player of the Year. Senior forward Zach Thomas was also named to the preseason All-Patriot League first team.

== Roster ==
2017–18 Bucknell Bison men's basketball team
Players
Coaches

Pos.	#	Name	Height	Weight	Year	Previous school	Hometown
C	0	Paul Newman	6 ft 9 in (2.06 m)	195 lb (88 kg)	Jr	St. Andrews School	Philadelphia, PA
G	1	Kimbal Mackenzie	6 ft 1 in (1.85 m)	160 lb (73 kg)	Jr	John Carrol	Oakville, Ontario
G	2	Stephen Brown	5 ft 11 in (1.8 m)	160 lb (73 kg)	Sr	Christ Chapel	Manassas, VA
G	3	Jimmy Sotos	6 ft 3 in (1.91 m)	193 lb (88 kg)	Fr	Conant	Elk Grove Village, IL
F	4	Nate Sestina	6 ft 9 in (2.06 m)	247 lb (112 kg)	Jr	Cameron County	Emporium, PA
G	5	Jordan Sechan	6 ft 0 in (1.83 m)	168 lb (76 kg)	Fr	Northfield mount Hermon	New Canaan, CT
G	11	Avi Toomer	6 ft 3 in (1.91 m)	188 lb (85 kg)	So	Grady	Atlanta, GA
F	12	John Meeks	6 ft 6 in (1.98 m)	225 lb (102 kg)	Fr	The Burlington School	Burlington, NC
F	13	Bruce Moore	6 ft 8 in (2.03 m)	213 lb (97 kg)	So	McDonogh	Randallstown, MD
G	14	Ben Robinson	6 ft 5 in (1.96 m)	200 lb (91 kg)	So	High Point Christian	High Point, NC
G	15	Nate Jones	6 ft 5 in (1.96 m)	209 lb (95 kg)	Jr	Radford	Radford, VA
C	20	Nana Foulland	6 ft 10 in (2.08 m)	235 lb (107 kg)	Sr	Berks Catholic	Reading, PA
G	22	Matt O'Reilly	6 ft 3 in (1.91 m)	195 lb (88 kg)	Jr	Prolific Prep Academy	Moraga, CA
F	23	Zach Thomas	6 ft 7 in (2.01 m)	195 lb (88 kg)	Sr	Oakdale	Ijamsville, MD

Head coach

- Nathan Davis (Randolph–Macon)

Assistant coach(es)

- Paul Harrison (Washington and Lee)
- John Griffin (Bucknell)
- Joe Meehan (Lebanon Valley)

Legend

- (C) Team captain
- (S) Suspended
- (I) Ineligible
- (W) Walk-on
- Injured
- Current redshirt

Roster
Last update: Nov 9, 2017

== Schedule and results ==
Date time, TV	Rank^{#}	Opponent^{#}	Result	Record	Site (attendance) city, state
Exhibition
Oct 28, 2017*; 1:00 pm		at Towson	L 86–93		SECU Arena (434); Towson, MD
Non-conference regular season
Nov 10, 2017*; 8:30 pm, ESPN3		at Monmouth	L 78–79	0–1	OceanFirst Bank Center (3,159); West Long Branch, NJ
Nov 12, 2017*; 6:00 pm, SECN		at Arkansas	L 73–101	0–2	Bud Walton Arena (6,477); Fayetteville, AR
Nov 15, 2017*; 8:00 pm, ACCN		at No. 9 North Carolina	L 81–93	0–3	Dean E. Smith Center (13,941); Chapel Hill, NC
Nov 18, 2017*; 8:30 pm, BTN		at Maryland	L 78–80	0–4	Xfinity Center (13,303); College Park, MD
Nov 20, 2017*; 7:00 pm		Siena	W 115–92	1–4	Sojka Pavilion (2,053); Lewisburg, PA
Nov 22, 2017*; 7:00 pm		Ball State	W 87–83	2–4	Sojka Pavilion (2,217); Lewisburg, PA
Nov 26, 2017*; 2:00 pm, ESPN3		at Stony Brook	W 85–76	3–4	Island Federal Credit Union Arena (2,367); Stony Brook, NY
Nov 29, 2017*; 7:00 pm		at Saint Joseph's	L 73–80	3–5	Hagan Arena (3,783); Philadelphia, PA
Dec 2, 2017*; 7:00 pm		Vermont	W 81–77	4–5	Sojka Pavilion (3,044); Lewisburg, PA
Dec 5, 2017*; 7:00 pm, NESN+		at Northeastern	L 64–82	4–6	Matthews Arena (779); Boston, MA
Dec 16, 2017*; 6:00 pm		at VCU	L 79–85	4–7	Siegel Center (7,637); Richmond, VA
Dec 19, 2017*; 7:00 pm		at Richmond	W 86–78	5–7	Robins Center (5,501); Richmond, VA
Dec 22, 2017*; 7:00 pm		La Salle	W 88–81	6–7	Sojka Pavilion (2,553); Lewisburg, PA
Patriot League regular season
Dec 29, 2017; 7:00 pm		American	W 84–55	7–7 (1–0)	Sojka Pavilion (2,782); Lewisburg, PA
Jan 2, 2018; 7:00 pm		Boston University	L 79–84	7–8 (1–1)	Sojka Pavilion (2,018); Lewisburg, PA
Jan 5, 2018; 7:00 pm		at Army	W 83–66	8–8 (2–1)	Christl Arena (1,073); West Point, NY
Jan 8, 2018; 7:00 pm		at Lafayette	W 80–75 ^{OT}	9–8 (3–1)	Kirby Sports Center (986); Easton, PA
Jan 11, 2018; 7:00 pm		Lehigh	W 78–65	10–8 (4–1)	Sojka Pavilion (2,404); Lewisburg, PA
Jan 15, 2018; 7:00 pm, CBSSN		at Colgate	W 63–51	11–8 (5–1)	Cotterell Court (819); Hamilton, NY
Jan 17, 2018; 7:00 pm		at Loyola (MD)	W 78–70	12–8 (6–1)	Reitz Arena (1,024); Baltimore, MD
Jan 20, 2018; 12:00 pm		Holy Cross	W 77–56	13–8 (7–1)	Sojka Pavilion (3,031); Lewisburg, PA
Jan 24, 2018; 7:00 pm		at Navy	W 87–67	14–8 (8–1)	Alumni Hall (1,634); Annapolis, MD
Jan 28, 2018; 12:00 pm, CBSSN		at Boston University	W 91–79	15–8 (9–1)	Case Gym (900); Boston, MA
Jan 31, 2018; 7:00 pm		Army	W 83–71 ^{OT}	16–8 (10–1)	Sojka Pavilion (2,243); Lewisburg, PA
Feb 3, 2018; 7:00 pm		Lafayette	W 74–59	17–8 (11–1)	Sojka Pavilion (3,509); Lewisburg, PA
Feb 5, 2018; 7:00 pm, CBSSN		at Lehigh	L 89–92 ^{OT}	17–9 (11–2)	Stabler Arena (1,126); Bethlehem, PA
Feb 12, 2018; 7:00 pm, CBSSN		Colgate	W 65–64	18–9 (12–2)	Sojka Pavilion (2,395); Lewisburg, PA
Feb 14, 2018; 7:00 pm		Loyola (MD)	W 94–53	19–9 (13–2)	Sojka Pavilion (2,208); Lewisburg, PA
Feb 17, 2018; 12:00 pm		at Holy Cross	W 68–67 ^{OT}	20–9 (14–2)	Hart Center (1,818); Worcester, MA
Feb 21, 2018; 7:00 pm		Navy	W 85–61	21–9 (15–2)	Sojka Pavilion (2,869); Lewisburg, PA
Feb 24, 2018; 2:00 pm		at American	W 80–61	22–9 (16–2)	Bender Arena (1,298); Washington, D.C.
Patriot League tournament
Mar 1, 2018; 7:00 pm, PLN	(1)	at (8) Loyola (MD); Quarterfinals	W 83–78	23–9	Sojka Pavilion (2,492); Lewisburg, PA
Mar 4, 2018; 2:00 pm, CBSSN	(1)	(5) Boston University; Semifinals	W 90–59	24–9	Sojka Pavilion (2,925); Lewisburg, PA
Mar 7, 2018; 7:30 pm, CBSSN	(1)	(2) Colgate; Championship	W 83–54	25–9	Sojka Pavilion (3,946); Lewisburg, PA
NCAA tournament
Mar 16, 2018*; 7:10 pm, CBS	(14 MW)	vs. (3 MW) No. 5 Michigan State; First Round	L 78–82	25–10	Little Caesars Arena (20,314); Detroit, MI
*Non-conference game. ^{#}Rankings from AP Poll. (#) Tournament seedings in parentheses. MW=Midwest. All times are in Eastern Time.
