= 2017–18 Holy Cross Crusaders men's basketball team =

American college basketball season

2017–18 Holy Cross Crusaders men's basketball
- Conference: Patriot League
- Record: 12–19 (8–10 Patriot)
- Head coach: Bill Carmody (3rd season)
- Assistant coaches: Joe Scott; Joe Kennedy; Freddie Owens
- Home arena: Hart Center

2017–18 Patriot League men's basketball standings
	Conf.				Overall
Team	W		L	PCT	W		L	PCT
Bucknell †	16	–	2	.889	25	–	10	.714
Colgate	12	–	6	.667	19	–	14	.576
Navy	11	–	7	.611	20	–	12	.625
Lehigh	11	–	7	.611	16	–	14	.533
Boston University	10	–	8	.556	15	–	16	.484
Holy Cross	8	–	10	.444	12	–	19	.387
Lafayette	7	–	11	.389	10	–	21	.323
Army	6	–	12	.333	13	–	17	.433
Loyola (MD)	6	–	12	.333	9	–	22	.290
American	3	–	15	.167	6	–	24	.200
† 2018 Patriot League tournament winner

The 2017–18 Holy Cross Crusaders men's basketball team represented the College of the Holy Cross during the 2017–18 NCAA Division I men's basketball season. The Crusaders, led by third-year head coach Bill Carmody, played their home games at the Hart Center in Worcester, Massachusetts as members of the Patriot League. They finished the season 12–19, 8–10 in Patriot League play to finish in sixth place. In the Patriot League tournament, they defeated Navy in the quarterfinals before losing to Colgate in the semifinals.

== Previous season ==
The Crusaders finished the 2016–17 season 15–17, 9–9 in Patriot League play to finish in fifth place. In the Patriot League tournament, they lost in the quarterfinals to Navy.

== Roster ==
2017–18 Holy Cross Crusaders men's basketball team
Players
Coaches

Pos.	#	Name	Height	Weight	Year	Previous school	Hometown
G	0	Caleb Green	5 ft 10 in (1.78 m)	173 lb (78 kg)	Fr	Proctor Academy	Londonderry, NH
F	1	Karl Charles	6 ft 6 in (1.98 m)	194 lb (88 kg)	Jr	Rutgers Prep	Roselle, NJ
G	2	Kyle Copeland	6 ft 4 in (1.93 m)	171 lb (78 kg)	Fr	Phillips Exeter Academy	Leesburg, VA
G	4	Austin Butler	6 ft 5 in (1.96 m)	209 lb (95 kg)	Fr	Greater Latrobe HS	Letrobe, PA
F	5	Connor Niego	6 ft 8 in (2.03 m)	198 lb (90 kg)	Fr	Lyons Township HS	Western Springs, IL
G	10	Patrick Benzan	5 ft 11 in (1.8 m)	172 lb (78 kg)	Jr	Roxbury Latin School	Wellesley, MA
G	11	Will Powers	6 ft 0 in (1.83 m)	168 lb (76 kg)	So	Malvern Prep	Swarthmore, PA
G	12	Clayton Le Sann	6 ft 4 in (1.93 m)	181 lb (82 kg)	So	Cheshire Academy	Geneva, Switzerland
G/F	14	Marcellis Perkins	6 ft 4 in (1.93 m)	185 lb (84 kg)	Jr	Deep Creek HS	Chesapeake, VA
F	15	Matt Faw	6 ft 9 in (2.06 m)	206 lb (93 kg)	Fr	Upper Merion Area HS	King of Prussia, PA
F	20	Jehyve Floyd	6 ft 8 in (2.03 m)	226 lb (103 kg)	Jr	Sayreville War Memorial HS	Sayreville, NJ
F	21	Jacob Grandison	6 ft 6 in (1.98 m)	190 lb (86 kg)	Fr	Phillips Exeter Academy	Oakland, CA
G	31	Matt Zignorski	6 ft 2 in (1.88 m)	184 lb (83 kg)	Jr	Pope John XXIII HS	Sparta, NJ
C	33	Jack Stevens	6 ft 10 in (2.08 m)	247 lb (112 kg)	So	Kent School	Ithaca, NY

Head coach

- Bill Carmody (Union (NY))

Assistant coach(es)

- Joe Scott (Princeton)
- Joe Kennedy (Northwestern)
- Freddie Owens (Wisconsin)

Legend

- (C) Team captain
- (S) Suspended
- (I) Ineligible
- (W) Walk-on
- Injured
- Current redshirt

Roster
Last update: December 28, 2017

== Schedule and results ==
Date time, TV	Rank^{#}	Opponent^{#}	Result	Record	Site (attendance) city, state
Non-conference regular season
Nov 10, 2017*; 6:00 pm		at Sacred Heart	W 69–64	1–0	William H. Pitt Center (1,062); Fairfield, CT
Nov 16, 2017*; 7:00 pm		Harvard	W 73–69	2–0	Hart Center (2,242); Worcester, MA
Nov 19, 2017*; 1:00 pm		at Rhode Island	L 66–88	2–1	Ryan Center (4,309); Kingston, RI
Nov 22, 2017*; 2:00 pm		at Fairleigh Dickinson	L 76–87	2–2	Rothman Center (402); Hackensack, NJ
Nov 25, 2017*; 1:00 pm		Albany	L 62–78	2–3	Hart Center (1,735); Worcester, MA
Dec 1, 2017*; 11:30 am, CBSSN		vs. Manhattan; Hall of Fame Belfast Classic semifinals	L 54–70	2–4	SSE Arena (5,256); Belfast, Northern Ireland
Dec 2, 2017*; 9:30 am, CBSSN		vs. La Salle; Hall of Fame Belfast Classic 3rd place game	L 54–58	2–5	SSE Arena (3,882); Belfast, Northern Ireland
Dec 6, 2017*; 7:00 pm		at Massachusetts	L 50–64	2–6	Mullins Center (2,395); Amherst, MA
Dec 9, 2017*; 3:00 pm		New Hampshire	W 62–58	3–6	Hart Center (1,275); Worcester, MA
Dec 19, 2017*; 7:00 pm		Iona	L 68–82	3–7	Hart Center (1,054); Worcester, MA
Dec 22, 2017*; 7:00 pm		at Siena	L 65–71	3–8	Times Union Center (5,526); Albany, NY
Patriot League regular season
Dec 29, 2017; 7:00 pm		Colgate	L 74–79	3–9 (0–1)	Hart Center (1,484); Worcester, MA
Jan 2, 2018; 7:00 pm		at Lafayette	L 48–60	3–10 (0–2)	Kirby Sports Center (1,147); Easton, PA
Jan 5, 2018; 6:00 pm		at Lehigh	L 77–83	3–11 (0–3)	Stabler Arena (814); Bethlehem, PA
Jan 8, 2018; 7:00 pm		Loyola (MD)	W 64–57	4–11 (1–3)	Hart Center (1,059); Worcester, MA
Jan 11, 2018; 7:00 pm		at Navy	L 56–61 ^{OT}	4–12 (1–4)	Alumni Hall (1,464); Annapolis, MD
Jan 14, 2018; 1:00 pm		Boston University	L 40–54	4–13 (1–5)	Hart Center (1,561); Worcester, MA
Jan 17, 2018; 7:00 pm		Army	W 70–66	5–13 (2–5)	Hart Center (1,134); Worcester, MA
Jan 20, 2018; 12:00 pm		at Bucknell	L 56–77	5–14 (2–6)	Sojka Pavilion (3,031); Lewisburg, PA
Jan 22, 2018; 7:00 pm, CBSSN		at American	W 60–57	6–14 (3–6)	Bender Arena (1,209); Washington, D.C.
Jan 27, 2018; 2:00 pm		Lafayette	W 85–74	7–14 (4–6)	Hart Center (3,396); Worcester, MA
Jan 29, 2018; 7:00 pm		Lehigh	L 67–71	7–15 (4–7)	Hart Center (2,052); Worcester, MA
Feb 3, 2018; 4:00 pm		at Loyola (MD)	W 73–57	8–15 (5–7)	Reitz Arena (704); Baltimore, MD
Feb 7, 2018; 7:00 pm		Navy	L 34–69	8–16 (5–8)	Hart Center (1,136); Worcester, MA
Feb 10, 2018; 1:00 pm		at Boston University	W 73–62	9–16 (6–8)	Case Gym (571); Boston, MA
Feb 14, 2018; 7:00 pm		at Army	W 70–65	10–16 (7–8)	Christl Arena (601); West Point, NY
Feb 17, 2018; 12:00 pm		Bucknell	L 67–68 ^{OT}	10–17 (7–9)	Hart Center (1,818); Worcester, MA
Feb 21, 2018; 7:00 pm		American	W 70–64	11–17 (8–9)	Hart Center (1,394); Worcester, MA
Feb 24, 2018; 2:00 pm		at Colgate	L 53–59	11–18 (8–10)	Cotterell Court (956); Hamilton, NY
Patriot League tournament
Mar 1, 2018; 7:00 pm, Stadium	(6)	at (3) Navy; Quarterfinals	W 81–65	12–18	Alumni Hall (667); Annapolis, MD
Mar 4, 2018; 12:00 pm, CBSSN	(6)	at (2) Colgate; Semifinals	L 55–62	12–19	Cotterell Court (1,279); Hamilton, NY
*Non-conference game. ^{#}Rankings from AP Poll. (#) Tournament seedings in parentheses. All times are in Eastern Time.
