= 2017–18 Navy Midshipmen men's basketball team =

American college basketball season

2017–18 Navy Midshipmen men's basketball
- Conference: Patriot League
- Record: 20–12 (11–7 Patriot)
- Head coach: Ed DeChellis (7th season)
- Assistant coaches: Emmett Davis; Jon Perry; Kendrick Saunders; Jeromy Yetter
- Home arena: Alumni Hall

2017–18 Patriot League men's basketball standings
	Conf.				Overall
Team	W		L	PCT	W		L	PCT
Bucknell †	16	–	2	.889	25	–	10	.714
Colgate	12	–	6	.667	19	–	14	.576
Navy	11	–	7	.611	20	–	12	.625
Lehigh	11	–	7	.611	16	–	14	.533
Boston University	10	–	8	.556	15	–	16	.484
Holy Cross	8	–	10	.444	12	–	19	.387
Lafayette	7	–	11	.389	10	–	21	.323
Army	6	–	12	.333	13	–	17	.433
Loyola (MD)	6	–	12	.333	9	–	22	.290
American	3	–	15	.167	6	–	24	.200
† 2018 Patriot League tournament winner

The 2017–18 Navy Midshipmen men's basketball team represented the United States Naval Academy during the 2017–18 NCAA Division I men's basketball season. The Midshipmen, led by seventh-year head coach Ed DeChellis, played their home games at Alumni Hall in Annapolis, Maryland as members of the Patriot League. They finished the season 20–12, 11–7 in Patriot League play to finish in a tie for third place. They lost in the quarterfinals of the Patriot League tournament to Holy Cross.

== Previous season ==
The Midshipmen finished the 2016–17 season 16–16, 10–8 in Patriot League play to finish in fourth place. In the Patriot League tournament, they defeated Holy Cross in the quarterfinals before losing to top-seeded Bucknell in the semifinals.

== Roster ==
2017–18 Navy Midshipmen men's basketball team
Players
Coaches

Pos.	#	Name	Height	Weight	Year	Previous school	Hometown
G	0	Nourse Fox	6 ft 1 in (1.85 m)	205 lb (93 kg)	Sr	Memphis University School	Memphis, TN
F	1	Tom Lacey	6 ft 7 in (2.01 m)	235 lb (107 kg)	Sr	Seton Hall Prep	Glen Ridge, NJ
G	2	Hasan Abdullah	6 ft 0 in (1.83 m)	195 lb (88 kg)	Jr	Clay-Chalkville HS	Birmingham, AL
G	3	Matt Cullen	6 ft 1 in (1.85 m)	180 lb (82 kg)	So	Greater Latrobe HS	Latrobe, PA
G	5	Ryan Pearson	6 ft 2 in (1.88 m)	190 lb (86 kg)	Jr	Henrico HS	Richmond, VA
G	10	JR Mathis	6 ft 1 in (1.85 m)	175 lb (79 kg)	Fr	Kentucky Country Day School	Louisville, KY
G	11	Isaiah Burnett	6 ft 5 in (1.96 m)	180 lb (82 kg)	Fr	Glenelg Country School	Annapolis, MD
F	12	Ryan Reagan	6 ft 8 in (2.03 m)	215 lb (98 kg)	Fr	General McLane HS	Edinboro, PA
G	14	Bryce Dulin	6 ft 4 in (1.93 m)	210 lb (95 kg)	Sr	Nixa HS	Nixa, MO
G	15	Dominick Antonelli	6 ft 1 in (1.85 m)	190 lb (86 kg)	Jr	Trinity HS	Mechanicsburg, PA
G	20	Shawn Anderson	6 ft 4 in (1.93 m)	215 lb (98 kg)	Sr	New Castle HS	New Castle, PA
F	21	George Kiernan	6 ft 7 in (2.01 m)	225 lb (102 kg)	Jr	Hinsdale Central HS	Hinsdale, IL
G	22	Cam Davis	6 ft 1 in (1.85 m)	185 lb (84 kg)	Fr	Kickapoo HS	Battlefield, MO
F	23	Mo Lewis	6 ft 6 in (1.98 m)	240 lb (109 kg)	Jr	Milton	Alpharetta, GA
F	24	Connor Mannion	6 ft 7 in (2.01 m)	225 lb (102 kg)	So	Lambert HS	Suwanee, GA
F	25	Alec Loehr	6 ft 8 in (2.03 m)	215 lb (98 kg)	Fr	Rosemount HS	Inver Grove Height, MN
C	32	Jack Lawrence	6 ft 9 in (2.06 m)	245 lb (111 kg)	Fr	Gonzaga College HS	Alexandria, VA
C	33	Luke Loehr	6 ft 7 in (2.01 m)	225 lb (102 kg)	Fr	Rosemount HS	Inver Grove Height, MN
F	34	Danny Ogele	6 ft 7 in (2.01 m)	220 lb (100 kg)	Fr	St. Ignatius Prep	Chicago, IL
C	40	Evan Wieck	6 ft 8 in (2.03 m)	235 lb (107 kg)	So	Amarillo HS	Amarillo, TX
F	41	Tyler Riemersma	6 ft 8 in (2.03 m)	215 lb (98 kg)	Fr	Jefferson HS	Bloomington, MN
G	44	Eli Lake	6 ft 6 in (1.98 m)	195 lb (88 kg)	Fr	Blythewood HS	Blythewood, SC

Head coach

- Ed DeChellis (Penn State)

Assistant coach(es)

- Emmett Davis (St. Lawrence)
- Jon Perry (East Tennessee State)
- Kendrick Saunders (Palm Beach Atlantic)
- Jeromy Yetter (Lock Haven)

Legend

- (C) Team captain
- (S) Suspended
- (I) Ineligible
- (W) Walk-on
- Injured
- Current redshirt

Roster
Last update: December 8, 2017

== Schedule and results ==
Date time, TV	Rank^{#}	Opponent^{#}	Result	Record	Site (attendance) city, state
Non-conference regular season
Nov 10, 2017*; 9:00 pm, CBSSN		Pittsburgh; Veterans Classic	W 72–61	1–0	Alumni Hall (3,238); Annapolis, MD
Nov 12, 2017*; 4:00 pm, ACCN Extra		at No. 13 Miami (FL)	L 55–89	1–1	Watsco Center (6,611); Coral Gables, FL
Nov 15, 2017*; 7:00 pm, ESPN3		at Penn	L 44–66	1–2	The Palestra (2,051); Philadelphia
Nov 18, 2017*; 4:00 pm, ESPN3		at Bryant	W 79–71	2–2	Chace Athletic Center (839); Smithfield, RI
Nov 22, 2017*; 7:00 pm		Washington College	W 110–45	3–2	Alumni Hall (1,242); Annapolis, MD
Nov 24, 2017*; 4:00 pm		vs. St. Francis Brooklyn; FGCU Shootout	W 85–76	4–2	Alico Arena (267); Fort Myers, FL
Nov 25, 2017*; 7:00 pm, ESPN3		at Florida Gulf Coast; FGCU Shootout	L 54–70	4–3	Alico Arena (3,597); Fort Myers, FL
Nov 26, 2017*; 12:00 pm		vs. Denver; FGCU Shootout	W 79–71	5–3	Alico Arena (167); Fort Myers, FL
Dec 1, 2017*; 7:00 pm		Delaware	W 82–76	6–3	Alumni Hall (535); Annapolis, MD
Dec 3, 2017*; 1:00 pm		Morgan State	W 66–59	7–3	Alumni Hall (848); Annapolis, MD
Dec 6, 2017*; 7:00 pm		at Coppin State	W 73–50	8–3	Physical Education Complex (1,462); Baltimore, MD
Dec 10, 2017*; 7:00 pm, SNY		at Columbia	W 73–68	9–3	Levien Gymnasium (1,169); New York City, NY
Dec 21, 2017*; 7:00 pm		Lipscomb	L 64–73	9–4	Alumni Hall (972); Annapolis, MD
Patriot League regular season
Dec 29, 2017; 7:00 pm		at Loyola (MD)	L 63–72	9–5 (0–1)	Reitz Arena (623); Baltimore, MD
Jan 2, 2018; 7:00 pm		Lehigh	W 78–66	10–5 (1–1)	Alumni Hall (632); Annapolis, MD
Jan 5, 2018; 7:00 pm		American	W 70–64	11–5 (2–1)	Alumni Hall (1,178); Annapolis, MD
Jan 8, 2018; 7:00 pm		at Colgate	L 62–70	11–6 (2–2)	Cotterell Court (426); Hamilton, NY
Jan 11, 2018; 7:00 pm		Holy Cross	W 61–56 ^{OT}	12–6 (3–2)	Alumni Hall (1,464); Annapolis, MD
Jan 14, 2018; 2:30 pm, CBSSN		Army	L 62–64	12–7 (3–3)	Alumni Hall (5,710); Annapolis, MD
Jan 17, 2018; 7:00 pm		at Lafayette	W 75–72	13–7 (4–3)	Kirby Sports Center (923); Easton, PA
Jan 20, 2018; 2:00 pm		Boston University	L 68–75	13–8 (4–4)	Alumni Hall (1,942); Annapolis, MD
Jan 24, 2018; 7:00 pm		Bucknell	L 67–87	13–9 (4–5)	Alumni Hall (1,634); Annapolis, MD
Jan 27, 2018; 7:00 pm		at Lehigh	W 77–75	14–9 (5–5)	Stabler Arena (1,614); Bethlehem, PA
Jan 31, 2018; 7:00 pm		at American	W 61–44	15–9 (6–5)	Bender Arena (583); Washington, D.C.
Feb 4, 2018; 12:00 pm, CBSSN		Colgate	L 64–69	15–10 (6–6)	Alumni Hall (1,053); Annapolis, MD
Feb 7, 2018; 7:00 pm		at Holy Cross	W 69–34	16–10 (7–6)	Hart Center (1,136); Worcester, MA
Feb 10, 2018; 1:30 pm, CBSSN		at Army	W 68–59	17–10 (8–6)	Christl Arena (5,181); West Point, NY
Feb 14, 2018; 7:00 pm		Lafayette	W 71–69	18–10 (9–6)	Alumni Hall (653); Annapolis, MD
Feb 17, 2018; 12:00 pm		at Boston University	W 62–48	19–10 (10–6)	Case Gym (1,404); Boston, MA
Feb 21, 2018; 7:00 pm		at Bucknell	L 61–85	19–11 (10–7)	Sojka Pavilion (2,869); Lewisburg, PA
Feb 24, 2018; 2:00 pm		Loyola (MD)	W 62–56	20–11 (11–7)	Alumni Hall (1,942); Annapolis, MD
Patriot League tournament
Mar 1, 2018; 7:00 pm, Stadium	(3)	(6) Holy Cross; Quarterfinals	L 65–81	20–12	Alumni Hall (667); Annapolis, MD
*Non-conference game. ^{#}Rankings from AP Poll. (#) Tournament seedings in parentheses. All times are in Eastern Time.
