= 2017–18 Colgate Raiders men's basketball team =

American college basketball season

2017–18 Colgate Raiders men's basketball

CBI, First round
- Conference: Patriot League
- Record: 19–14 (12–6 Patriot)
- Head coach: Matt Langel (7th season)
- Assistant coaches: Dave Klatsky; Michael McGarvey; Michael-Hakim Jordan
- Home arena: Cotterell Court

2017–18 Patriot League men's basketball standings
	Conf.				Overall
Team	W		L	PCT	W		L	PCT
Bucknell †	16	–	2	.889	25	–	10	.714
Colgate	12	–	6	.667	19	–	14	.576
Navy	11	–	7	.611	20	–	12	.625
Lehigh	11	–	7	.611	16	–	14	.533
Boston University	10	–	8	.556	15	–	16	.484
Holy Cross	8	–	10	.444	12	–	19	.387
Lafayette	7	–	11	.389	10	–	21	.323
Army	6	–	12	.333	13	–	17	.433
Loyola (MD)	6	–	12	.333	9	–	22	.290
American	3	–	15	.167	6	–	24	.200
† 2018 Patriot League tournament winner

The 2017–18 Colgate Raiders men's basketball team represented Colgate University during the 2017–18 NCAA Division I men's basketball season. The Raiders, led by seventh-year head coach Matt Langel, played their home games at Cotterell Court in Hamilton, New York as members of the Patriot League. They finished the season 19–14, 12–6 in Patriot League play to finish in second place. They defeated Lafayette and Holy Cross to advance to the championship game of the Patriot League tournament where they lost to Bucknell. They were invited to the College Basketball Invitational where they lost in the first round to San Francisco.

== Previous season ==
The Raiders finished the 2016–17 season 10–22, 8–10 in Patriot League play to finish in a tie for sixth place. As the No. 6 seed in the Patriot League Tournament, they lost in the quarterfinals to Lehigh.

== Roster ==
2017–18 Colgate Raiders men's basketball team
Players
Coaches

Pos.	#	Name	Height	Weight	Year	Previous school	Hometown
G	0	Sean O'Brien	6 ft 2 in (1.88 m)	188 lb (85 kg)	Sr	Penn Charter	Lafayette Hill, PA
G	1	Jordan Burns	6 ft 0 in (1.83 m)	175 lb (79 kg)	Fr	John Marshall	San Antonio, TX
G	3	David Favorite	6 ft 3 in (1.91 m)	200 lb (91 kg)	Jr	Alamo Heights	San Antonio, TX
F	4	Sam Lindgren (W)	6 ft 6 in (1.98 m)	210 lb (95 kg)	Jr	Germantown Academy	Doylestown, PA
F/C	5	Malcolm Regisford	6 ft 8 in (2.03 m)	220 lb (100 kg)	Jr	Bellarmine-Jefferson	Woodland Hills, CA
F	10	Will Rayman	6 ft 8 in (2.03 m)	200 lb (91 kg)	So	Millbrook	New York, NY
C	12	Dana Batt	6 ft 9 in (2.06 m)	215 lb (98 kg)	Jr	Homestead	Fort Wayne, IN
G	13	Jack Ferguson	6 ft 3 in (1.91 m)	170 lb (77 kg)	Fr	Homestead	Fort Wayne, IN
F	14	Tom Rivard	6 ft 7 in (2.01 m)	200 lb (91 kg)	Sr	Worcester Academy	Worcester, MA
F	15	Jordan Swopshire	6 ft 6 in (1.98 m)	210 lb (95 kg)	Sr	Fort Zumwalt South	O'Fallon, MO
G	21	David Maynard	6 ft 4 in (1.93 m)	190 lb (86 kg)	Fr	Herriman	Herriman, UT
F	22	Hugh Baxter	6 ft 8 in (2.03 m)	205 lb (93 kg)	Fr	Scotch College	Melbourne, Australia
G	23	Milan Williams	6 ft 3 in (1.91 m)	210 lb (95 kg)	So	Detroit Country Day	Detroit, MI
G	25	Jordan Robertson	6 ft 3 in (1.91 m)	185 lb (84 kg)	Sr	Wildwood Catholic	Cape May Court House, NJ
G	30	Francisco Amiel	6 ft 2 in (1.88 m)	172 lb (78 kg)	Jr	Escola Secundaria Professor Ruy Luis Gomes	Corroios, Portugal
G	45	Dylan Whitbread (W)	6 ft 3 in (1.91 m)	210 lb (95 kg)	Sr	King Edward VII School	Johannesburg, South Africa

Head coach

- Matt Langel (Penn)

Assistant coach(es)

- Dave Klatsky (Penn)
- Mike McGarvey (Ursinus)
- Mike Jordan (Penn)

Legend

- (C) Team captain
- (S) Suspended
- (I) Ineligible
- (W) Walk-on
- Injured
- Current redshirt

Roster
Last update: November 8, 2017

== Schedule and results ==
Date time, TV	Rank^{#}	Opponent^{#}	Result	Record	Site (attendance) city, state
Exhibition
Nov 1, 2017*; 7:30 pm		Canisius	L 67–85		Cotterell Court (222); Hamilton, NY
Non-conference regular season
Nov 10, 2017*; 7:00 pm, SNY		at UConn	L 58–70	0–1	Harry A. Gampel Pavilion (7,154); Storrs, CT
Nov 16, 2017*; 7:00 pm		Cornell	W 72–61	1–1	Cotterell Court (661); Hamilton, NY
Nov 16, 2017*; 7:00 pm		UMBC	W 93–88	2–1	Cotterell Court (303); Hamilton, NY
Nov 22, 2017*; 4:00 pm, ACCN Extra		at Boston College	L 79–83	2–2	Conte Forum (3,277); Chestnut Hill, MA
Nov 25, 2017*; 2:00 pm		Columbia	W 77–71	3–2	Cotterell Court (418); Hamilton, NY
Nov 29, 2017*; 7:00 pm, ESPN3		at Albany	L 69–75	3–3	SEFCU Arena (2,004); Albany, NY
Dec 2, 2017*; 2:00 pm, ESPN3		at Binghamton	L 65–76	3–4	Binghamton University Events Center (3,640); Vestal, NY
Dec 6, 2017*; 7:30 pm, ESPN3		at Marist	L 76–78	3–5	McCann Field House (980); Poughkeepsie, NY
Dec 9, 2017*; 2:00 pm, ACCN Extra		at Syracuse	L 58–77	3–6	Carrier Dome (21,380); Syracuse, NY
Dec 12, 2017*; 7:00 pm		NJIT	W 87–77	4–6	Cotterell Court (377); Hamilton, NY
Dec 22, 2017*; 2:00 pm		Pitt–Bradford	W 103–52	5–6	Cotterell Court (328); Hamilton, NY
Patriot League regular season
Dec 29, 2017; 7:00 pm		at Holy Cross	W 79–74	6–6 (1–0)	Hart Center (1,484); Worcester, MA
Jan 2, 2018; 7:00 pm		at American	W 72–63	7–6 (2–0)	Bender Arena (135); Washington, D.C.
Jan 5, 2018; 7:00 pm		Lafayette	L 68–71	7–7 (2–1)	Cotterell Court (237); Hamilton, NY
Jan 8, 2018; 5:00 pm		Navy	W 70–62	8–7 (3–1)	Cotterell Court (426); Hamilton, NY
Jan 11, 2018; 7:00 pm		at Boston University	L 58–72	8–8 (3–2)	Case Gym (387); Boston, MA
Jan 15, 2018; 7:00 pm, CBSSN		Bucknell	L 51–63	8–9 (3–3)	Cotterell Court (819); Hamilton, NY
Jan 17, 2018; 7:00 pm		at Lehigh	W 76–72	9–9 (4–3)	Stabler Arena (867); Bethlehem, PA
Jan 20, 2018; 7:00 pm		Loyola (MD)	W 77–72	10–9 (5–3)	Cotterell Court (685); Hamilton, NY
Jan 24, 2018; 7:00 pm, Stadium		at Army	W 81–78	11–9 (6–3)	Christl Arena (552); West Point, NY
Jan 27, 2018; 7:00 pm		American	W 83–69	12–9 (7–3)	Cotterell Court (848); Hamilton, NY
Jan 31, 2018; 7:00 pm		at Lafayette	L 83–93	12–10 (7–4)	Kirby Sports Center (1,145); Easton, PA
Feb 4, 2018; 12:00 pm, CBSSN		at Navy	W 69–64	13–10 (8–4)	Alumni Hall (1,053); Annapolis, MD
Feb 7, 2018; 7:00 pm, Stadium		Boston University	W 74–60	14–10 (9–4)	Cotterell Court (959); Hamilton, NY
Feb 12, 2018; 7:00 pm, CBSSN		at Bucknell	L 64–65	14–11 (9–5)	Sojka Pavilion (2,395); Lewisburg, PA
Feb 14, 2018; 7:00 pm		Lehigh	L 78–88	14–12 (9–6)	Cotterell Court (312); Hamilton, NY
Feb 17, 2018; 2:00 pm		at Loyola (MD)	W 68–47	15–12 (10–6)	Reitz Arena (587); Baltimore, MD
Feb 21, 2018; 7:00 pm		Army	W 87–83	16–12 (11–6)	Cotterell Court (502); Hamilton, NY
Feb 24, 2018; 2:00 pm		Holy Cross	W 59–53	17–12 (12–6)	Cotterell Court (956); Hamilton, NY
Patriot League tournament
Mar 1, 2018; 7:00 pm, Stadium	(2)	(7) Lafayette; Quarterfinals	W 76–54	18–12	Cotterell Court (1,338); Hamilton, NY
Mar 4, 2018; 12:00 pm, CBSSN	(2)	(6) Holy Cross; Semifinals	W 62–55	19–12	Cotterell Court (1,279); Hamilton, NY
Mar 7, 2018; 7:30 pm, CBSSN	(2)	(1) Bucknell; Championship game	L 54–83	19–13	Sojka Pavilion (3,946); Lewisburg, PA
CBI
Mar 14, 2018*; 10:00 pm		at San Francisco; First round	L 68–72	19–14	War Memorial Gymnasium (1,339); San Francisco, CA
*Non-conference game. ^{#}Rankings from AP Poll. (#) Tournament seedings in parentheses. All times are in Eastern Time Source.
