= St. Thomas More Academy (Delaware) =

Location
- 133 Thomas More Drive; Magnolia, (Kent County), Delaware 19962; United States; 39°5′3″N 75°28′49″W

Information
- Type: Private, coeducational
- Religious affiliation: Roman Catholic
- Established: 1997
- Closed: 2020
- Oversight: Diocese of Wilmington
- Principal: Rachel Casey
- Grades: 9–12
- Team name: Ravens
- Rival: Delmarva Christian
- Accreditation: Middle States Association of Colleges and Schools
- Director of Admissions: Dr. Judi Coffield
- Athletic Director: Tim Freud
- Dean of Academic Affairs: Ben Wegemer
- Website: http://www.saintmore.org

St. Thomas More Academy was a private Roman Catholic high school in Magnolia, Delaware. It was a parish run school in the Roman Catholic Diocese of Wilmington.

== Background ==
In 1952 Holy Cross Parish opened Holy Cross Elementary School, the first Catholic School in Kent County, Delaware. In 1957, the parish opened Holy Cross High School (HCHS); both the elementary and the high school resided on the same campus on State Street in downtown Dover. HCHS was operated as a parish school by the Felician Sisters. In the 1980s, HCHS experienced problems with enrollment and finance. The Felician Sisters left the parish, and their convent then became the parish rectory. In 1987 HCHS was closed. The former HCHS building was renamed the Donohoe Center (after Fr. John Donohoe) and became the Junior High School building of Holy Cross Elementary School, which it remains to this day.

After the closing of HCHS in 1987, a group of laymen and women formulated plans for a new Catholic high school in Kent County. Their effort saw to the establishment of Thomas More Academy, Incorporated. When, after some years, a gift of land provided the site for the school, the group commissioned a feasibility study and embarked upon a fundraising campaign. More than $1.6 million was raised for the first of St. Thomas More Academy's buildings.

The project of opening a high school of quality required resources beyond those available to the founders of Thomas More Academy, Incorporated. A delegation met with the Bishop of the Diocese of Wilmington, Most. Rev. Michael Saltarelli, and presented a report on the state of the school. The Diocese took on the school, making it one of its own – a Diocesan high school.

In 1998 the school opened its doors. In 2001, STM had its first graduating class. A major building project, with the support of the Diocese, saw the expansion of STMA in 2003; the chapel, lobby, office suite, cafeteria, media center, and fine arts wing were added. In 2011, the school dedicated all of the various halls and wings of the school to patron saints of the many area parishes represented by students at the school. The school gymnasium was dedicated as the Bishop Michael A. Saltarelli Gymnasium. In the 2012–13 school year STMA celebrated its 15th anniversary.

STMA sought to provide an example of collaboration between a bishop and his flock. Acknowledging the work done by the followers of the academy, Bishop Saltarelli said, "I am grateful for the great gift they have made to the Church, making it possible for us to continue our holy mission to teach the Good News in such an important way."

The school opened in 1998 and expanded its facilities in 2003. The name was changed from "Academy" to "Preparatory" in 2007. In 2011, the name was changed back to its founding name, "Saint Thomas More Academy".

In January 2017, it was announced by agreement of Fr. James Lentini, Pastor of Holy Cross Parish and Most. Rev. W. Francis Malooly, Bishop of Wilmington, that effective July 1, 2017, the Diocese of Wilmington would relinquish control of the STMA (along with its financial commitment) to Holy Cross Parish. Holy Cross Parish in Dover, would administer STMA and make it its parish high school. Beginning with the start of the 2017–18 school year, the high school whose origin began with a parish high school, came full circle. In fall of 2018, STMA celebrated its 20th anniversary, simultaneously Holy Cross High School would have celebrated its 60th anniversary.

In 2020 it was announced that, due to low enrollment numbers, St. Thomas More Academy would finally close its doors just over two decades after it opened.
