= Vermont Miss Basketball =

American high school sports award

- Description: Honor recognizing the top girls high school basketball player in the state of Vermont
- Country: United States
- Presented by: Burlington Free Press

The Vermont Miss Basketball honor recognizes the top girls high school basketball player in the state of Vermont. The award is presented annually by the Burlington Free Press, since 1991.

== Award winners ==
Year	Player	High School	Class	College
2024	Elise Berger	CVU	Senior	Bard College (baseball)
2023	Addi Hunter	CVU	Senior	Connecticut College
2022	Paige Winter	Essex	Senior	Western New England
2021	Catherine Gilwee	CVU	Senior	Vermont
2020	Olivia Rockwood	Windsor	Senior	Maine
2019	Sadie Stetson	St. Johnsbury	Senior	American
2018	Sadie Stetson	St. Johnsbury	Junior	
2017	Sadie Stetson	St. Johnsbury	Sophomore	
2016	Sadie Otley	CVU	Senior	Tufts
2015	Laurel Jaunich	CVU	Junior	Navy
2014	Emily Kinneston	CVU	Senior	American
2013	Emily Kinneston	CVU	Junior	
2012	Abby Iannotti	Mt. Anthony	Senior	Holy Family
2011	Reagan Jewell	Rice	Senior	Holy Family
2010	Abbey Lalime	Lake Region	Senior	UMass/Stonehill
2009	Tiffany Johnson	BFA-St. Albans	Senior	Franklin Pierce
2008	Alyssa Herrington	Mt. Anthony	Senior	Manhattan
2007	Kelli Hier	Rice	Senior	Vermont
2006	Alissa Sheftic	Essex	Senior	Vermont
2005	Corey Rusin	Twin Valley	Senior	Boston College
2004	Corey Rusin	Twin Valley	Junior	
2003	Dani Rayner/Jevy Rayner	Bellows Falls	Seniors	St. Michael's/St. Michael's
2002	Courtney Ludwig	Mt. Anthony	Senior	Saint Rose
2001	Sharmion Selman	Burlington	Senior	American International
2000	Morgan Valley	Rice	Senior	Connecticut
1999	Morgan Valley	Rice	Junior	
1998	Libby Smith	Essex	Senior	Vermont
1997	Rachel Bryan	Mount Abraham	Senior	Vermont
1996	Jasmyn Huntington	Oxbow	Senior	Nevada/North Carolina
1995	Jasmyn Huntington	Oxbow	Junior	
1994	Kathy Ardell	Essex	Senior	Vermont
1993	Carrie Smith	Oxbow	Senior	Maine
1992	Sarah Schreib	Essex	Senior	James Madison
1991	Carrie Lapine	Essex	Senior	Vermont

=== Schools with winners ===
School	Number of Awards	Years
CVU	7	2013, 2014, 2015, 2016, 2021, 2023, 2024
Essex	6	1991, 1992, 1994, 1998, 2006, 2022
Rice	4	1999, 2000, 2007, 2011
Mount Anthony	3	2002, 2008, 2012
Oxbow	3	1993, 1995, 1996
St. Johnsbury	3	2017, 2018, 2019
Bellows Falls	2	2003
Twin Valley	2	2004, 2005
Burlington	1	2001
Lake Region	1	2010
Mount Abraham	1	1997
Windsor	1	2020
