= 2020–21 UMass Lowell River Hawks women's basketball team =

Intercollegiate basketball season

2020–21 UMass Lowell River Hawks women's basketball
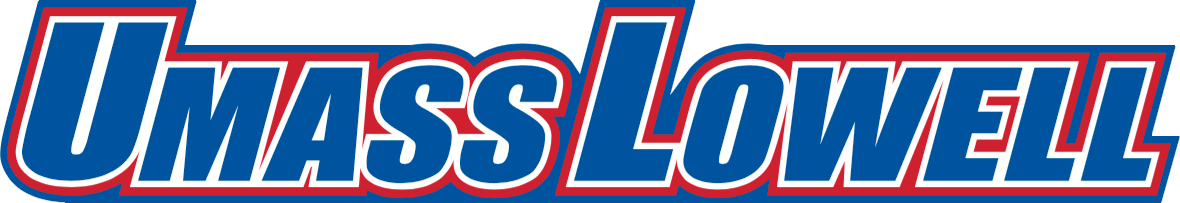
- Conference: America East Conference
- Record: 12–9 (10–6 America East)
- Head coach: Tom Garrick (3rd season)
- Assistant coaches: Denise King; Stefanie Murphy; Taryn Johnson
- Home arena: Costello Athletic Center; Tsongas Center

2020–21 America East Conference women's basketball standings
	Conf.				Overall
Team	W		L	PCT	W		L	PCT
Maine	13	–	2	.867	17	–	3	.850
Stony Brook †	11	–	3	.786	15	–	6	.714
UMass Lowell	10	–	6	.625	12	–	9	.571
Albany	5	–	7	.417	7	–	11	.389
New Hampshire	5	–	11	.313	5	–	15	.250
NJIT	4	–	9	.308	4	–	14	.222
Vermont	4	–	2	.667	4	–	2	.667
UMBC	2	–	4	.333	2	–	6	.250
Hartford	3	–	9	.250	3	–	9	.250
Binghamton	5	–	9	.357	5	–	11	.313
† 2021 America East tournament winner Vermont suspended their season on January 24, 2021; UMBC suspended their season on January 29, 2021; Hartford suspended their season on February 10, 2021; Binghamton suspended their season on February 19, 2021; As of March 12, 2021; Rankings from AP poll

The 2020–21 UMass Lowell River Hawks women's basketball team represented the University of Massachusetts Lowell during the 2020–21 NCAA Division I women's basketball season. The River Hawks were led by third-year head coach Tom Garrick and played most their home games in the Costello Athletic Center while select games were played in the Tsongas Center at UMass Lowell. They were members of the America East Conference. They finished the season 12–9, 10–6 in America East play to finish in fourth place.

== Media ==
All non-televised home games and conference road games will stream on either ESPN3 or AmericaEast.tv. Most road games will stream on the opponents website.

== Roster ==
2020–21 UMass Lowell River Hawks women's basketball team
Players
Coaches

Pos.	#	Name	Height	Year	Previous school	Hometown
F	0	Laura Vaida	6 ft 3 in (1.91 m)	So	Ienachita Vacarescu National College	Bucharest, Romania
G	2	Kalkidan Mamo	5 ft 4 in (1.63 m)	So	Cambridge	Cambridge, MA
G	3	Jaliena Sanchez	5 ft 6 in (1.68 m)	So	Springfield Central	Springfield, MA
G	4	Linda Svenne	5 ft 9 in (1.75 m)	Sr	Riga State Gymnasium No. 3	Riga, Latvia
G	5	Kharis Idom	5 ft 8 in (1.73 m)	Jr	Colonial	Orlando, FL
G	11	Leilani Rodriguez	5 ft 5 in (1.65 m)	Fr	Worcester Academy	Worcester, MA
G	13	Kaylen Banwareesingh	6 ft 0 in (1.83 m)	So	Monsignor Scanlan	Bronx, NY
F	14	Erin Lofaro	5 ft 11 in (1.8 m)	Fr	Marlboro Central HS	Marlboro, NY
G	20	Sydney Coombs	5 ft 9 in (1.75 m)	Fr	NH Spartans	Newmarket, NH
G	21	Jaini Edmonds	5 ft 9 in (1.75 m)	Fr	Holy Name Central Catholic	Worcester, MA
F	23	Niya Johnson	6 ft 1 in (1.85 m)	RS Sr	Nazareth Regional	Brooklyn, NY
F	25	Denise Solis	6 ft 1 in (1.85 m)	So	Windsor HS	Windsor, CT
G	32	Shamyjha Price	5 ft 7 in (1.7 m)	So	Bishop Canevin HS	Pittsburgh, PA
F	33	Tiahna Sears	5 ft 10 in (1.78 m)	Sr	Bunbury Catholic College	Bunbury, Australia

Head coach

- Denise King (Rhode Island)

Assistant coach(es)

- Faisal Khan (UMBC)
- Stefanie Murphy (Boston College)
- Dianna Thomas (Hofstra)

Legend

- (C) Team captain
- (S) Suspended
- (I) Ineligible
- (W) Walk-on
- Injured
- Current redshirt

Roster

== Schedule ==
Date time, TV	Rank^{#}	Opponent^{#}	Result	Record	Site (attendance) city, state
Non-conference regular season
Dec 6, 2020*; 2:00 pm, ACCNX		at Boston College	L 38–88	0–1	Conte Forum; Chestnut Hill, MA
Dec 12, 2020*; 1:00 pm, SNY		at #3 UConn	L 23–79	0–2	Harry A. Gampel Pavilion; Storrs, CT
Dec 16, 2020*; 12:00 pm		Northeastern	W 69–59	1–2	Costello Athletic Center; Lowell, MA
America East regular Season
Dec 19, 2020; 3:00 pm, ESPN+		at Vermont	W 66–50	2–2 (1–0)	Patrick Gym; Burlington, VT
Dec 20, 2020; 2:00 pm, ESPN+		at Vermont	L 56–61	2–3 (1–1)	Patrick Gym; Burlington, VT
Dec 27, 2020; 1:00 pm, ESPN+		Stony Brook	W 63–60	3–3 (2–1)	Costello Athletic Center; Lowell, MA
Dec 28, 2020; 1:00 pm, ESPN3		Stony Brook	L 44–60	3–4 (2–2)	Costello Athletic Center; Lowell, MA
Jan 2, 2021; 4:00 pm, ESPN+		at NJIT	W 58–53	4–4 (3–2)	Wellness and Events Center; Newark, NJ
Jan 3, 2021; 2:00 pm, ESPN+		at NJIT	W 53–47	5–4 (4–2)	Wellness and Events Center; Newark, NJ
Jan 9, 2021; 1:00 pm, ESPN+		at Hartford	W 81–45	6–4 (5–2)	Chase Arena at Reich Family Pavilion; West Hartford, CT
Jan 10, 2021; 1:00 pm, ESPN+		at Hartford	W 74–52	7–4 (6–2)	Chase Arena at Reich Family Pavilion; West Hartford, CT
Jan 16, 2021; 1:00 pm, ESPN+		Binghamton	W 59–49	8–4 (7-2)	Costello Athletic Center; Lowell, MA
Jan 17, 2021; 1:00 pm, ESPN+		Binghamton	L 63–67	8–5 (7–3)	Costello Athletic Center; Lowell, MA
Jan 30, 2021; 2:00 pm, ESPN+		Albany	L 39–46	8–6 (7–4)	Costello Athletic Center; Lowell, MA
Jan 31, 2021; 1:00 pm, ESPN+		Albany	W 46-31	9–6 (8–4)	Costello Athletic Center; Lowell, MA
Feb 6, 2021; 4:00 pm, ESPN+		at Maine	L 49–81	9–7 (8–5)	Memorial Gym; Orono, ME
Feb 7, 2021; 1:00 pm, ESPN+		at Maine	L 51–53	9–8 (8–6)	Memorial Gym; Orono, ME
Feb 13, 2021; 1:00 pm, ESPN+		New Hampshire	W 74–40	10–8 (9–6)	Costello Athletic Center; Lowell, MA
Feb 14, 2021; 1:00 pm, ESPN+		New Hampshire	W 73–52	11–8 (10–6)	Costello Athletic Center; Lowell, MA
America East Women's Tournament
02/28/2021; 1:00 pm, ESPN+	(3)	(6) NJIT; Quarterfinals	W 72–52	12–8	Costello Athletic Center; Lowell, MA
03/07/2021; 3:00 pm, ESPN+	(3)	at (2) Stony Brook; Semifinals	L 55–75	12–9	Island Federal Credit Union Arena; Stony Brook, NY
*Non-conference game. ^{#}Rankings from AP Poll. (#) Tournament seedings in parentheses. All times are in Eastern Time.

== See also ==
- 2020–21 UMass Lowell River Hawks men's basketball team
