= 2020–21 America East Conference men's basketball season =

2020-21 America East Conference Men's Basketball Season
- League: NCAA Division I
- Sport: Basketball
- Teams: 10
- TV partner(s): ESPN+, ESPNU, ESPN3, Regional Networks

2020–21 NCAA Division I men's basketball season
- Season champions: UMBC, Vermont
- Season MVP: Ryan Davis, Vermont

America East Conference tournament
- Champions: Hartford
- Runners-up: UMass Lowell
- Finals MVP: Austin Williams, Hartford

America East Conference men's basketball seasons
- ← 2019–20 2021–22 →

2020–21 America East Conference men's basketball standings
	Conf.				Overall
Team	W		L	PCT	W		L	PCT
UMBC	10	–	4	.714	14	–	6	.700
Vermont	10	–	4	.714	10	–	5	.667
New Hampshire	9	–	6	.600	10	–	9	.526
Hartford †	8	–	6	.571	15	–	9	.625
Albany	6	–	6	.500	7	–	9	.438
UMass Lowell	7	–	8	.467	11	–	12	.478
Stony Brook	7	–	9	.438	9	–	14	.391
NJIT	6	–	10	.375	7	–	12	.368
Binghamton	4	–	10	.286	4	–	14	.222
Maine	2	–	6	.250	2	–	7	.222
† 2021 AmEast tournament winner Maine suspended its season on February 13, 2021.

The 2020–21 America East Conference men's basketball season began with practices in October 2020, followed by the start of the 2020–21 NCAA Division I men's basketball season in November 2020. Conference play began in December and concluded with the 2021 America East men's basketball tournament. The America East expanded from 9 teams to 10 with the arrival of NJIT on July 1, 2020.

== Preseason ==
The America East announced its preseason honors and polls on November 11, 2020.

=== Preseason Poll ===
Rank	Team	Points
1	Vermont	80 (8)
2	UMBC	72 (2)
3	New Hampshire	66
4	Albany	51
5	Stony Brook	44
6	Hartford	43
7	UMass Lowell	38
8	NJIT	28
T9	Binghamton	14
T9	Maine	14
(first place votes in parentheses)

=== Preseason All-Conference Team ===
Award	Recipients
All-Conference Team	Zach Cooks (NJIT); Nick Guadarrama (New Hampshire); Cam Healy (Albany); Obadiah Noel (UMass Lowell); Stef Smith (Vermont)

== Regular season ==
=== Conference matrix ===
This table summarizes the head-to-head results between teams in conference play. Each team is scheduled to play all other conference teams twice.

	Albany	Binghamton	Hartford	Maine	New Hampshire	NJIT	Stony Brook	UMass Lowell	UMBC	Vermont
vs. Albany	–	0–0	0–0	0–0	1–1	0–2	1–1	1–1	2–0	1–1
vs. Binghamton	0–0	–	2–0	0–0	1–1	0–2	2–0	2–0	1–1	2–0
vs. Hartford	0–0	0–2	–	0–2	2–0	1–1	1–1	1–1	1–1	0–0
vs. Maine	0–0	0–0	2–0	–	1–1	1–1	0–0	0–0	0–0	2–0
vs. New Hampshire	1–1	1–1	0–2	1–1	–	0–0	0–2	1–2	2–0	0–0
vs. NJIT	2–0	2–0	1–1	1–1	0–0	–	1–1	1–1	1–1	1–1
vs. Stony Brook	1–1	0–2	1–1	0–0	2–0	1–1	–	0–2	2–0	2–0
vs. UMass Lowell	1–1	0–2	1–1	0–0	2–1	1–1	2–0	–	0–0	1–1
vs. UMBC	0–2	1–1	1–1	0–0	0–2	1–1	0–2	0–0	–	1–1
vs. Vermont	1–1	0–2	0–0	0–2	0–0	1–1	0–2	1–1	1–1	–
Total	6–6	4–10	8–6	2–6	9–6	6–10	7–9	7–8	10–4	10–4

== Postseason ==
=== America East tournament ===
The 2021 America East men's basketball tournament took place following the end of the conference regular season.

=== NCAA tournament ===
Seed	Region	School	First Four	1st Round	2nd Round	Sweet 16	Elite Eight	Final Four	Championship
16	South	Hartford	N/A	defeated by (1) Baylor					

=== National Invitation tournament ===
Seed	Bracket	School	1st Round	2nd Round	Quarterfinals	Semifinals	Championship
