= 2020–21 Stony Brook Seawolves women's basketball team =

Intercollegiate basketball season

2020–21 Stony Brook Seawolves women's basketball

America East tournament champions
- Conference: America East Conference
- Record: 15–6 (11–3 America East)
- Head coach: Caroline McCombs (7th season)
- Assistant coaches: Jeff Williams; Bri Hutchen; Gabe Lazo
- Home arena: Island Federal Credit Union Arena

2020–21 America East Conference women's basketball standings
	Conf.				Overall
Team	W		L	PCT	W		L	PCT
Maine	13	–	2	.867	17	–	3	.850
Stony Brook †	11	–	3	.786	15	–	6	.714
UMass Lowell	10	–	6	.625	12	–	9	.571
Albany	5	–	7	.417	7	–	11	.389
New Hampshire	5	–	11	.313	5	–	15	.250
NJIT	4	–	9	.308	4	–	14	.222
Vermont	4	–	2	.667	4	–	2	.667
UMBC	2	–	4	.333	2	–	6	.250
Hartford	3	–	9	.250	3	–	9	.250
Binghamton	5	–	9	.357	5	–	11	.313
† 2021 America East tournament winner Vermont suspended their season on January 24, 2021; UMBC suspended their season on January 29, 2021; Hartford suspended their season on February 10, 2021; Binghamton suspended their season on February 19, 2021; As of March 12, 2021; Rankings from AP poll

The 2020–21 Stony Brook Seawolves women's basketball team represented Stony Brook University during the 2020–21 NCAA Division I women's basketball season. The Seawolves, led by seventh-year head coach Caroline McCombs, played their home games at the Island Federal Credit Union Arena in Stony Brook, New York and were members of the America East Conference.

The Seawolves finished in second place in the America East after going 11–3 during the conference regular season. They beat UMass Lowell by 20 points in the semifinals to earn a rematch with Maine in the championship game after the previous season's was cancelled. As the underdog, the Seawolves beat Maine 64–60 to win their first-ever NCAA tournament berth.

As a No. 14 seed, the Seawolves lost 79–44 to No. 3 seed Arizona in the first round.

== Media ==
All non-televised home games and conference road games were streamed on ESPN3 or ESPN+.

== Roster ==
2020–21 Stony Brook Seawolves women's basketball team
Players
Coaches

Pos.	#	Name	Height	Year	Previous school	Hometown
G	0	Gigi Gonzalez	5 ft 7 in (1.7 m)	So	Nova	Miramar, FL
F	1	Courtney Furr	6 ft 0 in (1.83 m)	Jr	Howard	Elkridge, MD
G	2	Earlette Scott	5 ft 10 in (1.78 m)	Jr	Providence	Brooklyn, NY
G	3	Asiah Dingle	5 ft 4 in (1.63 m)	Jr	Kent State	Boston, MA
G	4	Anastasia Warren	5 ft 8 in (1.73 m)	Jr	Westlake	Atlanta, GA
G/F	5	Jonae Cox	5 ft 11 in (1.8 m)	Sr	Woodrow Wilson	Portsmouth, VA
G	11	Victoria Johnson	5 ft 7 in (1.7 m)	Jr	Hinds CC	Camden, MS
F	13	Nairmar Vargas-Reyes	6 ft 0 in (1.83 m)	Jr	Florida SouthWestern State	Camuy, Puerto Rico
G	14	Leah Burden	5 ft 7 in (1.7 m)	So	Carle Place	Westbury, NY
F	15	Randi Baldwin	5 ft 10 in (1.78 m)	Fr	Elizabeth Seton	Hyattsville, MD
F	21	Kelis Corley	5 ft 10 in (1.78 m)	Fr	St. John's College	Capitol Heights, MD
F	22	McKenzie Bushee	6 ft 1 in (1.85 m)	Sr	Mt. Lebanon	Pittsburgh, PA
F	23	Aminata Zie	6 ft 1 in (1.85 m)	So	Gaspard Monge	Paris, France
G/F	24	Hailey Zeise	5 ft 10 in (1.78 m)	Sr	North Allegheny	Pittsburgh, PA
F	32	Leighah Amori-Wool	6 ft 0 in (1.83 m)	Sr	Western Michigan	Evanston, IL
F	33	India Pagán	6 ft 1 in (1.85 m)	Sr	New London	New London, CT

Head coach

- Caroline McCombs (Youngstown State)

Assistant coach(es)

- Jeff Williams (Howard)
- Bri Hutchen (Alabama)
- Gabe Lazo (FIU)

Legend

- (C) Team captain
- (S) Suspended
- (I) Ineligible
- (W) Walk-on
- Injured
- Current redshirt

Roster
Last update: August 30, 2025

== Schedule ==
Date time, TV	Rank^{#}	Opponent^{#}	Result	Record	Site (attendance) city, state
Non-conference regular season
November 25, 2020*; 2:00 p.m., ESPN3		Fordham	L 58–62	0–1	Island Federal Credit Union Arena; Stony Brook, NY
November 29, 2020*; 2:00 p.m., ESPN+		No. 23 Syracuse	L 39–50	0–2	Island Federal Credit Union Arena; Stony Brook, NY
December 2, 2020*; 2:00 p.m., NEC Front Row		at Sacred Heart	Canceled		William H. Pitt Center; Fairfield, CT
December 3, 2020*; 2:00 p.m.		Sacred Heart	Canceled		Island Federal Credit Union Arena; Stony Brook, NY
December 8, 2020*; 6:00 p.m., ESPN3		at Manhattan	W 65–52	1–2	Draddy Gymnasium; Riverdale, NY
December 14, 2020*; 4:00 p.m., ESPN3		Hofstra	W 63–52	2–2	Island Federal Credit Union Arena; Stony Brook, NY
America East Conference regular season
December 19, 2020; 2:00 p.m., ESPN+		Binghamton	W 61–52	3–2 (1–0)	Island Federal Credit Union Arena; Stony Brook, NY
December 20, 2020; 2:00 p.m., ESPN+		Binghamton	W 55–47	4–2 (2–0)	Island Federal Credit Union Arena; Stony Brook, NY
December 27, 2020; 1:00 p.m., ESPN+		at UMass Lowell	L 60–63	4–3 (2–1)	Tsongas Center; Lowell, MA
December 28, 2020; 1:00 p.m., ESPN+		at UMass Lowell	W 60–44	5–3 (3–1)	Tsongas Center; Lowell, MA
January 2, 2021; 1:00 p.m., ESPN+		at UMBC	Canceled		UMBC Event Center; Baltimore, MD
January 3, 2021; 1:00 p.m., ESPN+		at UMBC	Canceled		UMBC Event Center; Baltimore, MD
January 16, 2021; 1:00 p.m., ESPN3		at New Hampshire	L 49–52	5–4 (3–2)	Lundholm Gym; Durham, NH
January 17, 2021; 1:00 p.m., ESPN3		at New Hampshire	W 64–41	6–4 (4–2)	Lundholm Gym; Durham, NH
January 23, 2021; 2:00 p.m., ESPN3		NJIT	W 63–51	7–4 (5–2)	Island Federal Credit Union Arena; Stony Brook, NY
January 24, 2021; 2:00 p.m., ESPN3		NJIT	W 73–41	8–4 (6–2)	Island Federal Credit Union Arena; Stony Brook, NY
January 30, 2021; 1:00 p.m., ESPN+		at Hartford	W 67–47	9–4 (7–2)	Chase Arena at Reich Family Pavilion; West Hartford, CT
January 31, 2021; 1:00 p.m., ESPN+		at Hartford	W 62–49	10–4 (8–2)	Chase Arena at Reich Family Pavilion; West Hartford, CT
February 13, 2021; 3:00 p.m., ESPN3		Maine	W 59–54	11–4 (9–2)	Island Federal Credit Union Arena; Stony Brook, NY
February 14, 2021; 2:00 p.m., ESPN3		Maine	L 49–54	11–5 (9–3)	Island Federal Credit Union Arena; Stony Brook, NY
February 22, 2021; 2:00 p.m., ESPN+		Albany	W 58–46	12–5 (10–3)	Island Federal Credit Union Arena; Stony Brook, NY
February 23, 2021; 3:00 p.m., ESPN+		Albany	W 62–42	13–5 (11–3)	Island Federal Credit Union Arena; Stony Brook, NY
America East women's tournament
March 7, 2021; 3:00 p.m., ESPN+	(2)	(3) UMass Lowell; Semifinals	W 75–55	14–5	Island Federal Credit Union Arena; Stony Brook, NY
March 12, 2021; 5:00 p.m., ESPNU	(2)	at (1) Maine; Championship game	W 60–56	15–5	Memorial Gym; Orono, ME
NCAA tournament
March 22, 2021*; 2:00 p.m., ESPN2	(14 M)	vs. (3 M) Arizona; First round	L 44–79	15–6	Alamodome; San Antonio, TX
*Non-conference game. ^{#}Rankings from AP poll. (#) Tournament seedings in parentheses. All times are in Eastern.

== See also ==
- 2020–21 Stony Brook Seawolves men's basketball team
