= Johannah Leddy Donovan =

American educator and politician

Johannah Leddy Donovan (born September 18, 1944) is an American educator and politician.

Born in Burlington, Vermont, Donovan graduated from Rice Memorial High School and then received her bachelor's degree from Trinity College in Burlington, Vermont. Donovan was the widow of Thomas Donovan and taught school for Vermont Adult Learning. A Democrat, Donovan served in the Vermont House of Representatives from 2001 to 2021.

Her father Bernard Joseph Leddy served as Judge of the United States District Court for the District of Vermont. Her brother James P. Leddy was a member of the Vermont State Senate. Her son T.J. Donovan was elected as Vermont Attorney General in 2016, having previously served as State's Attorney of Chittenden County since 2007.
