= 2020–21 Vermont Catamounts men's basketball team =

American college basketball season

2020–21 Vermont Catamounts men's basketball

America East regular season co-champions
- Conference: America East Conference
- Record: 10–5 (10–4 America East)
- Head coach: John Becker (10th season)
- Assistant coaches: Kyle Cieplicki; Ryan Schneider; Hamlet Tibbs
- Home arena: Patrick Gym

2020–21 America East Conference men's basketball standings
	Conf.				Overall
Team	W		L	PCT	W		L	PCT
UMBC	10	–	4	.714	14	–	6	.700
Vermont	10	–	4	.714	10	–	5	.667
New Hampshire	9	–	6	.600	10	–	9	.526
Hartford †	8	–	6	.571	15	–	9	.625
Albany	6	–	6	.500	7	–	9	.438
UMass Lowell	7	–	8	.467	11	–	12	.478
Stony Brook	7	–	9	.438	9	–	14	.391
NJIT	6	–	10	.375	7	–	12	.368
Binghamton	4	–	10	.286	4	–	14	.222
Maine	2	–	6	.250	2	–	7	.222
† 2021 AmEast tournament winner Maine suspended its season on February 13, 2021.

The 2020–21 Vermont Catamounts men's basketball team represented the University of Vermont in the 2020–21 NCAA Division I men's basketball season. They played their home games at the Patrick Gym in Burlington, Vermont and were led by tenth-year head coach John Becker. They finished the season 10–5, 10–4 in America East play, to finish in 2nd place. In the America East tournament, they lost in the semifinals to Hartford.

== Previous season ==
The Catamounts finished the 2019–20 season 26–7, 14–2 in America East play, to win the regular season conference championship. They defeated Maine and UMBC to advance to the championship game of the America East tournament. However, the championship game, along with all other postseason tournaments, were canceled amid the COVID-19 pandemic.

== Roster ==
2020–21 Vermont Catamounts men's basketball team
Players
Coaches

Pos.	#	Name	Height	Weight	Year	Previous school	Hometown
G	0	Stef Smith	6 ft 2 in (1.88 m)	190 lb (86 kg)	Sr	Bill Crothers Secondary School	Ajax, ON
G	1	Aaron Deloney	6 ft 0 in (1.83 m)	165 lb (75 kg)	So	Grant HS	Portland, OR
F	4	Georges Lefebvre	6 ft 9 in (2.06 m)	200 lb (91 kg)	Fr	Cape Fear Academy	Montreal, QC
F	5	Duncan Demuth	6 ft 8 in (2.03 m)	210 lb (95 kg)	Jr	Seminole HS; Oklahoma State	Seminole, FL
F	12	Bailey Patella	6 ft 5 in (1.96 m)	185 lb (84 kg)	Sr	Vermont Academy	Lenox, MA
F	14	Isaiah Powell	6 ft 6 in (1.98 m)	220 lb (100 kg)	Jr	Colonie Central HS	Albany, NY
F	15	Nick Fiorillo (W)	6 ft 7 in (2.01 m)	210 lb (95 kg)	RS Fr	Scarborough HS	Scarborough, ME
G	20	Eric Beckett	6 ft 4 in (1.93 m)	225 lb (102 kg)	So	Tilton School	Ajax, ON
G	21	Justin Mazzulla	6 ft 3 in (1.91 m)	195 lb (88 kg)	Sr	Bishop Hendricken HS; George Washington	Johnston, RI
G	24	Ben Shungu	6 ft 2 in (1.88 m)	200 lb (91 kg)	RS Sr	Rice Memorial HS	Burlington, VT
G	25	Kevin Garrison (W)	6 ft 0 in (1.83 m)	180 lb (82 kg)	Jr	Burlington HS	Burlington, VT
G	30	Deng Adiang (W)	5 ft 10 in (1.78 m)	160 lb (73 kg)	So	Vermont Academy	Jericho, VT
F	35	Ryan Davis	6 ft 8 in (2.03 m)	250 lb (113 kg)	Jr	Conant HS	Schaumburg, IL
F	42	Thomas Murphy	6 ft 8 in (2.03 m)	230 lb (104 kg)	GS	Northfield Mount Hermon School; Northeastern	Wakefield, RI
G	55	Robin Duncan	6 ft 5 in (1.96 m)	190 lb (86 kg)	Jr	Harrison HS	Evansville, IN
G		Skyler Nash	6 ft 6 in (1.98 m)	215 lb (98 kg)	Sr	Gould Academy	Chicago, IL

Head coach

- John Becker (Catholic)

Assistant coach(es)

- Kyle Cieplicki (Vermont)
- Ryan Schneider (Marist)
- Hamlet Tibbs (West Virginia)

Legend

- (C) Team captain
- (S) Suspended
- (I) Ineligible
- (W) Walk-on
- Injured
- Current redshirt

Roster
Last update: December 2, 2020

== Schedule and results ==
Date time, TV	Rank^{#}	Opponent^{#}	Result	Record	Site (attendance) city, state
Regular season
December 21, 2020; 5:00 pm, ESPN3		at UMass Lowell	L 65–73	0–1 (0–1)	Costello Athletic Center (0); Lowell, MA
December 22, 2020; 3:00 pm, ESPN3		at UMass Lowell	W 62–53	1–1 (1–1)	Costello Athletic Center (0); Lowell, MA
December 27, 2020; 3:00 pm, ESPN+		NJIT	W 92–78	2–1 (2–1)	Patrick Gym (0); Burlington, VT
December 28, 2020; 2:00 pm, ESPN+		NJIT	L 80–81 ^{2OT}	2–2 (2–2)	Patrick Gym (0); Burlington, VT
January 2, 2021; 6:00 pm, ESPN3		Albany	L 62–63	2–3 (2–3)	Patrick Gym (0); Burlington, VT
January 3, 2021; 5:00 pm, ESPN+		Albany	W 74–66	3–3 (3–3)	Patrick Gym (0); Burlington, VT
January 9, 2021; 2:00 pm, ESPN+		at Binghamton	W 76–60	4–3 (4–3)	Binghamton University Events Center (0); Vestal, NY
January 10, 2021; 2:00 pm, ESPN+		at Binghamton	W 84–44	5–3 (5–3)	Binghamton University Events Center (0); Vestal, NY
January 16, 2021; 3:00 pm, ESPN3		Maine	W 65–30	6–3 (6–3)	Patrick Gym (0); Burlington, VT
January 17, 2021; 1:00 pm, ESPN3		Maine	W 88–60	7–3 (7–3)	Patrick Gym (0); Burlington, VT
February 13, 2021; 2:00 pm, ESPN+		Stony Brook	W 83–78	8–3 (8–3)	Patrick Gym (0); Burlington, VT
February 14, 2021; 12:00 pm, ESPN+		Stony Brook	W 61–57	9–3 (9–3)	Patrick Gym (0); Burlington, VT
February 18, 2021; 7:00 pm, ESPNU		at UMBC	W 80–71	10–3 (10–3)	UMBC Event Center (0); Catonsville, MD
February 19, 2021; 5:00 pm, ESPN3		at UMBC	L 55–66	10–4 (10–4)	UMBC Event Center (0); Catonsville, MD
America East tournament
March 6, 2021; 4:00 pm, ESPN+	(2)	(4) Hartford; Semifinals	L 65–71	10–5	Patrick Gym (0); Burlington, VT
*Non-conference game. ^{#}Rankings from AP poll. (#) Tournament seedings in parentheses. All times are in Eastern.
