= Morgan Valley =

American basketball player and coach

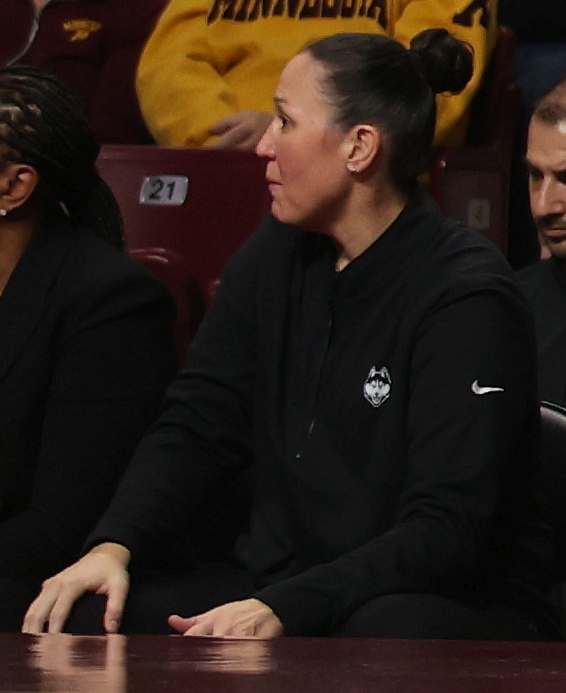
- Valley in 2023

Current position
- Title: Assistant coach
- Team: UConn
- Conference: Big East

Biographical details
- Born: April 7, 1981 (age 45); Colchester, Vermont, U.S.

Playing career
- 2000–2004: Connecticut
- Position: Guard

Coaching career (HC unless noted)
- 2004–2005: UConn (student assistant)
- 2005–2007: Holy Cross (assistant)
- 2007–2008: New Hampshire (assistant)
- 2008–2010: Towson (assistant)
- 2010–2014: UMass (assistant)
- 2014–2015: Virginia Tech (assistant)
- 2015–2017: Washington (assistant)
- 2017–2019: Arizona (assistant)
- 2019–2021: Hartford
- 2021–present: UConn (assistant)

Head coaching record
- Overall: 4–37 (.098)

Morgan Valley (born April 7, 1981) is an American former basketball player, former head coach of the Hartford Hawks women's basketball team, and current assistant coach for the UConn Huskies basketball team.

== Playing career ==
=== High school ===
A two-time Vermont Miss Basketball selection by the Burlington Free Press, Valley guided Rice Memorial High School to two-straight undefeated seasons and two Division I girls state championships.

=== College ===
Valley attended the University of Connecticut and played basketball for Hall of Fame coach Geno Auriemma from 2000-2004. As a member of three national championship squads, and the 2001–02 undefeated team, Valley appeared in 108 games.

==== University of Connecticut statistics ====
Morgan Valley Statistics at University of Connecticut
Year	G	FG	FGA	PCT	3FG	3FGA	PCT	FT	FTA	PCT	REB	AVG	A	TO	B	S	MIN	PTS	AVG
2000-01	29	33	84	.393	10	26	.385	12	14	.857	56	1.9	22	25	4	18	300	88	3.0
2001-02	16	19	43	.442	7	20	.350	13	17	.765	41	2.6	14	17	2	6	207	58	3.6
2002-03	34	29	69	.420	5	17	.294	13	16	.813	90	2.6	35	22	5	16	388	76	2.2
2003-04	29	24	48	.500	3	7	.429	9	16	.563	76	2.6	38	22	7	19	338	60	2.1
Totals	108	105	244	.430	25	70	.357	47	63	.746	263	2.4	109	86	18	59	1233	282	2.6

== Coaching career ==
After graduation, Valley spent one season as a student assistant with the Huskies before taking her first full-time coaching position at Holy Cross. After assistant coaching stops at New Hampshire and Towson, Valley had a four year stint as assistant coach under Sharon Dawley at UMass. After an assistant coaching stop at Virginia Tech, Valley joined the coaching staff at Washington where she was part of the Washington Huskies 2016 Final Four run.

From 2017 to 2019, Valley was on staff at Arizona, until April 19, 2019 when she was named the ninth head coach in Hartford history, replacing Kim McNeill, who accepted a similar position at East Carolina.

On April 21, 2021, it was announced that Valley would be returning to UConn as an assistant coach replacing Shea Ralph.

== Head coaching record ==
Record table
Season	Team	Overall	Conference	Standing	Postseason
Hartford Hawks (America East) (2019–2021)
2019–20	Hartford	1–28	1–15	9th	
2020–21	Hartford	3–9	3–9	T-9th	
Hartford:		4–37 (.098)	4–24 (.143)		
Total:		4–37 (.098)			
National champion Postseason invitational champion Conference regular season champion Conference regular season and conference tournament champion Division regular season champion Division regular season and conference tournament champion Conference tournament champion
