= 2020–21 UMBC Retrievers men's basketball team =

American college basketball season

2020–21 UMBC Retrievers men's basketball
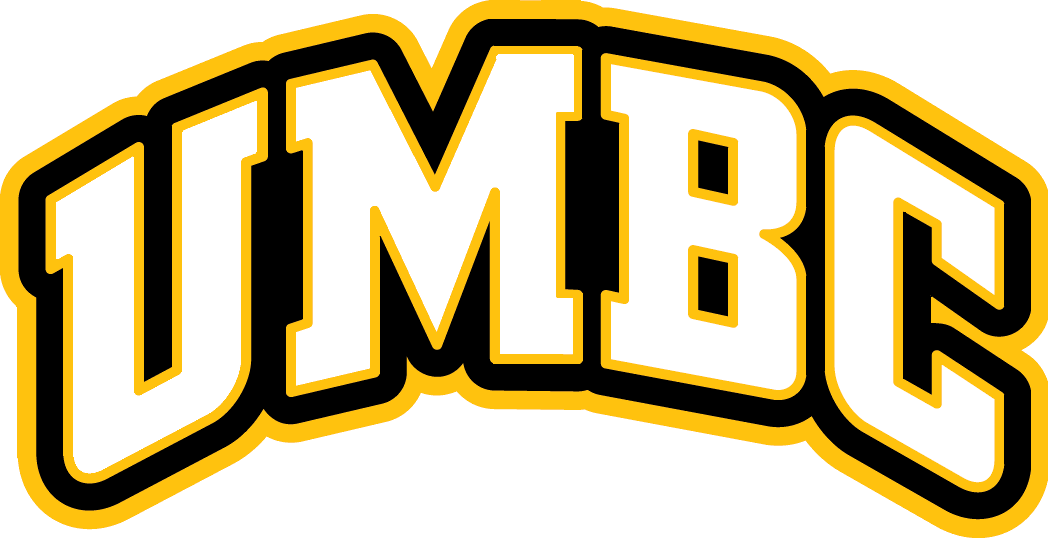

America East regular season co-champions
- Conference: America East Conference
- Record: 14–6 (10–4 America East)
- Head coach: Ryan Odom (5th season)
- Assistant coaches: Nate Dixon; Matt Henry; Bryce Crawford
- Home arena: UMBC Event Center

2020–21 America East Conference men's basketball standings
| | Conf. | | | | Overall |
| Team | W | | L | PCT | W | | L | PCT |
|---|---|---|---|---|---|---|---|---|
| UMBC | 10 | – | 4 | .714 | 14 | – | 6 | .700 |
| Vermont | 10 | – | 4 | .714 | 10 | – | 5 | .667 |
| New Hampshire | 9 | – | 6 | .600 | 10 | – | 9 | .526 |
| Hartford † | 8 | – | 6 | .571 | 15 | – | 9 | .625 |
| Albany | 6 | – | 6 | .500 | 7 | – | 9 | .438 |
| UMass Lowell | 7 | – | 8 | .467 | 11 | – | 12 | .478 |
| Stony Brook | 7 | – | 9 | .438 | 9 | – | 14 | .391 |
| NJIT | 6 | – | 10 | .375 | 7 | – | 12 | .368 |
| Binghamton | 4 | – | 10 | .286 | 4 | – | 14 | .222 |
| Maine | 2 | – | 6 | .250 | 2 | – | 7 | .222 |
† 2021 AmEast tournament winner Maine suspended its season on February 13, 2021.

The 2020–21 UMBC Retrievers men's basketball team represented the University of Maryland, Baltimore County in the 2020–21 NCAA Division I men's basketball season. The Retrievers, led by fifth-year head coach Ryan Odom, played their home games at the UMBC Event Center in Catonsville, Maryland as members of the America East Conference. In a season limited due to the ongoing COVID-19 pandemic, the Retrievers finished the season 14–6, 10–4 in America East play, to finish in a tie for first place. They lost to UMass Lowell in the semifinals of the America East tournament.

Following the season, Odom left the school to accept the head coaching position at Utah State. On April 12, 2021, the school named former Duquesne and Penn State head coach Jim Ferry as the team's new head coach.

== Previous season ==
The Retrievers finished the 2019–20 season 16–17, 8–8 in America East play, to finish in a tie for fourth place. They defeated New Hampshire in the quarterfinals of the America East tournament before losing in the semifinals to Vermont.

== Roster ==
2020–21 UMBC Retrievers men's basketball team
Players
Coaches

| Pos. | # | Name | Height | Weight | Year | Hometown |
|---|---|---|---|---|---|---|
| F | 0 | Keondre Kennedy | 6 ft 6 in (1.98 m) | 180 lb (82 kg) | Jr | Atlanta, GA |
| G | 1 | L.J. Owens Jr. | 6 ft 3 in (1.91 m) | 165 lb (75 kg) | Jr | Annapolis, MD |
| PG | 2 | Darnell Rogers | 5 ft 2 in (1.57 m) | 160 lb (73 kg) | Sr | Baltimore, MD |
| PF | 10 | Szymon Wojcik | 6 ft 9 in (2.06 m) | 220 lb (100 kg) | Jr | Warsaw, Poland |
| G/F | 11 | R.J. Eytle-Rock | 6 ft 3 in (1.91 m) | 225 lb (102 kg) | Jr | London, England |
| F | 12 | Brandon Horvath | 6 ft 10 in (2.08 m) | 210 lb (95 kg) | Sr | West River, MD |
| G | 15 | Sam Grace | 5 ft 10 in (1.78 m) | 200 lb (91 kg) | So | Baltimore, MD |
| G | 22 | Thomas Reid | 6 ft 2 in (1.88 m) | 155 lb (70 kg) | Fr | Toronto, ON |
| F/C | 23 | Rico Quinton | 6 ft 10 in (2.08 m) | 240 lb (109 kg) | Jr | Dyersburg, TN |
| G | 24 | Brendan Davis | 6 ft 0 in (1.83 m) | 160 lb (73 kg) | Fr | Annapolis, Maryland |
| F | 25 | Nathan Johnson | 6 ft 7 in (2.01 m) | 205 lb (93 kg) | So | Adel, IA |
| F | 30 | Daniel Akin | 6 ft 9 in (2.06 m) | 220 lb (100 kg) | Sr | London, England |
| F | 32 | Dimitrije Spasojevic | 6 ft 8 in (2.03 m) | 240 lb (109 kg) | Sr | Vršac, Serbia |
| G | 34 | Matteo Picarelli | 6 ft 2 in (1.88 m) | 180 lb (82 kg) | Fr | Milan, Italy |
| G | 41 | Jacob Boonyasith | 6 ft 3 in (1.91 m) | 215 lb (98 kg) | Jr | Grand Rapids, MI |

Head coach

- Ryan Odom (Hampden–Sydney)

Assistant coach(es)

- Nate Dixon (UNC Wilmington)
- Matt Henry (Trinity)
- Bryce Crawford (Ohio State)

Legend

- (C) Team captain
- (S) Suspended
- (I) Ineligible
- (W) Walk-on
- Injured
- Current redshirt

Roster
Last update: December 1, 2020

== Schedule and results ==
| Date time, TV | Rank^{#} | Opponent^{#} | Result | Record | Site (attendance) city, state |
Non-conference regular season
| November 25, 2020*; 4:00 pm, FS1 | | at Georgetown | L 62–70 | 0–1 | McDonough Arena (0); Washington, D.C. |
| November 28, 2020*; 3:00 pm | | at Saint Francis (PA) | W 80–65 | 1–1 | DeGol Arena (0); Loretto, PA |
| December 7, 2020*; 4:00 pm | | George Washington | W 92–81 | 2–1 | UMBC Event Center (0); Catonsville, MD |
| December 8, 2020*; 4:00 pm, ESPN3 | | Delaware | W 76–61 | 3–1 | UMBC Event Center (0); Catonsville, MD |
| December 11, 2020*; 7:00 pm | | at Mount St. Mary's | Canceled due to positive COVID-19 tests | | Knott Arena; Emmitsburg, MD |
| December 13, 2020*; 3:00 pm | | at Coppin State | W 66–49 | 4–1 | Physical Education Complex; Baltimore, MD |
America East Conference regular season
| December 19, 2020; 3:00 pm, ESPN3 | | at Albany | W 65–64 | 5–1 (1–0) | SEFCU Arena; Albany, NY |
| December 20, 2020; 1:00 pm, ESPN3 | | at Albany | W 65–60 | 6–1 (2–0) | SEFCU Arena; Albany, NY |
| December 27, 2020; 1:00 pm, ESPN3 | | Binghamton | W 74–67 | 7–1 (3–0) | UMBC Event Center; Catonsville, MD |
| December 28, 2020; 1:00 pm, ESPN3 | | Binghamton | L 69–75 | 7–2 (3–1) | UMBC Event Center; Catonsville, MD |
| January 9, 2021; 2:00 pm, ESPN3 | | at New Hampshire | W 69–54 | 8–2 (4–1) | Lundholm Gym; Durham, NH |
| January 10, 2021; ESPN3 | | at New Hampshire | W 68–66 | 9–2 (5–1) | Lundholm Gym; Durham, NH |
| January 16, 2021; 1:00 pm, ESPN3 | | Hartford | L 63–70 | 9–3 (5–2) | UMBC Event Center; Catonsville, MD |
| January 17, 2021; 1:00 pm, ESPN3 | | Hartford | W 57–49 | 10–3 (6–2) | UMBC Event Center; Catonsville, MD |
| January 31, 2021; 1:00 pm, ESPN+ | | at NJIT | L 65–69 | 10–4 (6–3) | Wellness and Events Center; Newark, NJ |
| February 2, 2021; 1:00 pm, ESPN+ | | at NJIT | W 75–71 | 11–4 (7–3) | Wellness and Events Center; Newark, NJ |
| February 7, 2021; 1:00 pm, ESPN3 | | at Stony Brook | W 71–65 | 12–4 (8–3) | Island Federal Credit Union Arena; Stony Brook, NY |
| February 8, 2021; 1:00 pm, ESPN+ | | at Stony Brook | W 60–48 | 13–4 (9–3) | Island Federal Credit Union Arena; Stony Brook, NY |
| February 18, 2021; 7:00 pm, ESPNU | | Vermont | L 71–80 | 13–5 (9–4) | UMBC Event Center; Catonsville, MD |
| February 19, 2021; 5:00 pm, ESPN3 | | Vermont | W 66–55 | 14–5 (10–4) | UMBC Event Center; Catonsville, MD |
America East tournament
| March 6, 2021; 2:00 pm, ESPN+ | (1) | (6) UMass Lowell; Semifinals | L 77–79 | 14–6 | UMBC Event Center; Catonsville, MD |
*Non-conference game. ^{#}Rankings from AP poll. (#) Tournament seedings in parentheses. All times are in Eastern.
