= 2020–21 New Hampshire Wildcats men's basketball team =

American college basketball season

2020–21 New Hampshire Wildcats men's basketball
- Conference: America East Conference
- Record: 10–9 (9–6 America East)
- Head coach: Bill Herrion (16th season)
- Assistant coaches: Chris Mohr; Jordon Bronner; Ryan Herrion
- Home arena: Lundholm Gym

2020–21 America East Conference men's basketball standings
	Conf.				Overall
Team	W		L	PCT	W		L	PCT
UMBC	10	–	4	.714	14	–	6	.700
Vermont	10	–	4	.714	10	–	5	.667
New Hampshire	9	–	6	.600	10	–	9	.526
Hartford †	8	–	6	.571	15	–	9	.625
Albany	6	–	6	.500	7	–	9	.438
UMass Lowell	7	–	8	.467	11	–	12	.478
Stony Brook	7	–	9	.438	9	–	14	.391
NJIT	6	–	10	.375	7	–	12	.368
Binghamton	4	–	10	.286	4	–	14	.222
Maine	2	–	6	.250	2	–	7	.222
† 2021 AmEast tournament winner Maine suspended its season on February 13, 2021.

Logo for the New Hampshire

The 2020–21 New Hampshire Wildcats men's basketball team represented the University of New Hampshire in the 2020–21 NCAA Division I men's basketball season. They played their home games at the Lundholm Gym in Durham, New Hampshire and were led by 16th-year head coach Bill Herrion. In a season limited due to the ongoing COVID-19 pandemic, the Wildcats finished the season 10–9, 9–6 in America East play, to finish in third place. They lost in the quarterfinals of the America East tournament to UMass Lowell.

== Previous season ==
The Wildcats finished the 2019–20 season 15–15, 8–8 in America East play, to finish in a tie for fourth place. They lost in the quarterfinals of the America East tournament to UMBC.

== Roster ==
2020–21 New Hampshire Wildcats men's basketball team
Players
Coaches

Pos.	#	Name	Height	Weight	Year	Previous school	Hometown
G	0	K.J. McClurg	6 ft 4 in (1.93 m)	185 lb (84 kg)	Fr	University HS	Morgantown, WV
G	1	Marque Maultsby	6 ft 3 in (1.91 m)	165 lb (75 kg)	Jr	Garner Magnet HS	Raleigh, NC
G	2	Sean Sutherlin	6 ft 5 in (1.96 m)	200 lb (91 kg)	Sr	Irondale HS	New Brighton, MN
F	3	Nick Guadarrama	6 ft 5 in (1.96 m)	250 lb (113 kg)	Jr	Perkiomen School	Newington, CT
G	4	Jon Willeman	6 ft 2 in (1.88 m)	170 lb (77 kg)	Fr	Lebanon HS	Lebanon, NH
G	5	Josh Hopkins	6 ft 5 in (1.96 m)	210 lb (95 kg)	Sr	James B. Dudley HS	Greensboro, NC
G	10	Nick Johnson	6 ft 4 in (1.93 m)	200 lb (91 kg)	RS Fr	All Hallows HS	The Bronx, NY
G	11	Blondeau Tchoukuiengo	6 ft 2 in (1.88 m)	190 lb (86 kg)	RS Fr	Montmorency School	Montreal, QC
F	13	Meekness Payne	6 ft 8 in (2.03 m)	215 lb (98 kg)	Jr	Arizona Compass Prep; Central Arizona CC	Phoenix, AZ
C	15	Tayler Mattos	6 ft 11 in (2.11 m)	240 lb (109 kg)	Jr	Kearsarge Regional HS; Bowling Green	New London, NH
G	22	Qon Murphy	6 ft 5 in (1.96 m)	195 lb (88 kg)	Jr	Cannon School; Houston Baptist	Charlotte, NC
F	23	Chris Lester	6 ft 6 in (1.98 m)	230 lb (104 kg)	RS Sr	Barrington HS	Barrington, IL
F	24	Jayden Martinez	6 ft 7 in (2.01 m)	215 lb (98 kg)	Jr	Byron P. Steele II HS	Cibolo, TX

Head coach

- Bill Herrion (Merrimack)

Assistant coach(es)

- Chris Mohr (Merrimack)
- Jordon Bronner (New Hampshire)
- Ryan Herrion (New Hampshire)

Legend

- (C) Team captain
- (S) Suspended
- (I) Ineligible
- (W) Walk-on
- Injured
- Current redshirt

Roster
Last update: November 30, 2020

== Schedule and results ==
Date time, TV	Rank^{#}	Opponent^{#}	Result	Record	Site (attendance) city, state
Regular season
November 25, 2020*; 1:00 p.m., ESPN3		Keene State	W 93–54	1–0	Lundholm Gym; Durham, NH
December 1, 2020*; 4:00 p.m., ESPN3		Bryant	L 85–93	1–1	Lundholm Gym; Durham, NH
December 6, 2020*; 2:00 p.m., ESPN+		at Quinnipiac	L 58–64	1–2	People's United Center; Hamden, CT
December 27, 2020; 1:00 p.m., ESPN+		Hartford	W 77–69	2–2 (1–0)	Lundholm Gym; Durham, NH
December 28, 2020; 1:00 p.m., ESPN3		Hartford	W 53–51	3–2 (2–0)	Lundholm Gym; Durham, NH
January 2, 2021; 3:00 p.m., ESPN3		at Maine	L 56–59	3–3 (2–1)	Memorial Gymnasium; Orono, ME
January 3, 2021; 1:00 p.m., ESPN3		at Maine	W 62–58	4–3 (3–1)	Memorial Gymnasium; Orono, ME
January 9, 2021; 12:00 p.m., ESPN3		UMBC	L 54–69	4–4 (3–2)	Lundholm Gym; Durham, NH
January 10, 2021; 12:00 p.m., ESPN		UMBC	L 66–68	4–5 (3–3)	Lundholm Gym; Durham, NH
January 16, 2021; 2:00 p.m., ESPN3		at Stony Brook	W 81–64	5–5 (4–3)	Island Federal Credit Union Arena; Stony Brook, NY
January 17, 2021; 2:00 p.m.		at Stony Brook	W 67–64	6–5 (5–3)	Island Federal Credit Union Arena; Stony Brook, NY
January 23, 2021; 2:00 p.m., ESPN3		Albany	W 71–64	7–5 (6–3)	Lundholm Gym; Durham, NH
January 24, 2021; 2:00 p.m., ESPN3		Albany	L 64–83	7–6 (6–4)	Lundholm Gym; Durham, NH
January 30, 2021; 2:00 p.m., ESPN3		at Binghamton	L 44–65	7–7 (6–5)	Binghamton University Events Center; Vestal, NY
January 31, 2021; 2:00 p.m., ESPN3		at Binghamton	W 71–65 ^{OT}	8–7 (7–5)	Binghamton University Events Center; Vestal, NY
February 5, 2021; 3:00 p.m., ESPN3		UMass Lowell	L 69–74	8–8 (7–6)	Lundholm Gym; Durham, NH
February 6, 2021; 1:00 p.m., ESPN3		UMass Lowell	W 74–63	9–8 (8–6)	Lundholm Gym; Durham, NH
February 20, 2021; 1:00 p.m., ESPN3		at UMass Lowell	W 69–67	10–8 (9–6)	Costello Athletic Center; Lowell, MA
America East tournament
February 28, 2021; 1:00 p.m., ESPN+	(3)	(6) UMass Lowell; Quarterfinals	L 64–72	10–9	Lundholm Gym; Durham, NH
*Non-conference game. ^{#}Rankings from AP poll. (#) Tournament seedings in parentheses. All times are in Eastern.
