= 2021 America East women's basketball tournament =

American women's college basketball tournament

- Classification: Division I
- Season: 2020–21
- Teams: 6
- Site: Campus sites
- Champions: Stony Brook (1st title)
- Winning coach: Caroline McCombs (1st title)
- MVP: Annie Warren (Stony Brook)
- Television: ESPNU/ESPN+
- America East women's basketball tournaments

2020–21 America East Conference women's basketball standings
	Conf.				Overall
Team	W		L	PCT	W		L	PCT
Maine	13	–	2	.867	17	–	3	.850
Stony Brook †	11	–	3	.786	15	–	6	.714
UMass Lowell	10	–	6	.625	12	–	9	.571
Albany	5	–	7	.417	7	–	11	.389
New Hampshire	5	–	11	.313	5	–	15	.250
NJIT	4	–	9	.308	4	–	14	.222
Vermont	4	–	2	.667	4	–	2	.667
UMBC	2	–	4	.333	2	–	6	.250
Hartford	3	–	9	.250	3	–	9	.250
Binghamton	5	–	9	.357	5	–	11	.313
Vermont suspended their season on January 24, 2021; UMBC suspended their season on January 29, 2021; Hartford suspended their season on February 10, 2021; Binghamton suspended their season on February 19, 2021
† 2021 America East tournament winner As of March 12, 2021; Rankings from AP poll

The 2021 America East women's basketball tournament began on February 28 and concluded with the championship game on March 12. Stony Brook won their first conference title and advanced to the 2021 NCAA tournament. Only six teams competed, as Binghamton, Hartford, UMBC, and Vermont suspended their seasons in January and February, due to COVID-19 issues.

== Seeds ==
Teams are seeded by record within the conference.

Seed	School	Conf	Overall
#1	Maine	13–2	16–2
#2	Stony Brook	11–3	13–5
#3	UMass Lowell	10–6	11–8
#4	Albany	5–7	6–10
#5	New Hampshire	5–11	5–14
#6	NJIT	4–9	4–14

== Schedule ==
All tournament games are nationally televised on an ESPN network:

Game	Time	Matchup	Television	Score
Quarterfinals – Sunday, February 28
1	1:00 pm	#6 NJIT at #3 UMass Lowell	ESPN+	52–72
2	5:00 pm	#5 New Hampshire at #4 Albany	ESPN+	43–49
Semifinals – Sunday, March 7
3	1:00 pm	#4 Albany at #1 Maine	ESPN+	47–67
4	3:00 pm	#3 UMass Lowell at #2 Stony Brook	ESPN+	55–75
Championship Game – Friday, March 12
5	5:00 pm	#2 Stony Brook at #1 Maine	ESPNU	64–60
Game Times in EST. Rankings denote tournament seeding.

== Bracket and Results ==
Teams with highest remaining seeds receive home court advantage.

Quarterfinals; Sunday, February 28, 2021; ESPN+
6	NJIT	52
3	UMass Lowell	72
5	New Hampshire	43
4	Albany	49

Semifinals; Sunday, March 7, 2021; ESPN+
3	UMass Lowell	55
2	Stony Brook	75
4	Albany	47
1	Maine	67

Championship Game; Friday, March 12, 2021; ESPNU
2	Stony Brook	64
1	Maine	60

== See also ==
- 2021 America East men's basketball tournament
