= Nicole Levesque =

American basketball player and coach

Personal information
- Born: April 11, 1972 (age 54) Shaftsbury, Vermont, U.S.
- Listed height: 5 ft 3 in (1.60 m)
- Listed weight: 115 lb (52 kg)

Career information
- High school: Mount Anthony (Bennington, Vermont)
- College: Wake Forest (1990–1994)
- WNBA draft: 1997: undrafted
- Playing career: 1997–1997
- Position: Point guard

Career history

Playing
- 1997: Charlotte Sting

Coaching
- 1998–2000: Vermont (assistant)

Career highlights
- Frances Pomeroy Naismith Award (1994); ACC All-Freshman Team (1991); 2× Second-team All-ACC (1992, 1994)
- Stats at WNBA.com
- Stats at Basketball Reference

Nicole Levesque (Andres) (born April 11, 1972) is an American former basketball player who played point guard at Wake Forest and for the Charlotte Sting in the WNBA. In 1999, she was named to Sports Illustrated's 50 Greatest Sports Figures from Vermont, and is the only Vermonter to ever play in the WNBA.

== Early life ==
After a standout playing career at Mount Anthony Union High School in Bennington, Vermont, where she helped the Patriots capture two Division I state titles in 1988 and 1990 while scoring a total of 1,938 points in her career, good for fifth all-time in the state. She was also a standout soccer player who scored 148 goals for Mount Anthony, which was a state record until 2015.

== College career ==
In 1990 Levesque headed to Wake Forest, where she set a number of school records. She was named to the ACC's All-Freshman team in her first season with the Deamon Deacons, and was a two-time ACC Second Team All-Conference Selection. She was also the winner of the Frances Pomeroy Naismith Award in 1994, given to the top senior in the nation under 5 ft 8in. In 1991, Levesque was also part of USA Basketball's Olympic Festival East team and was a Fast Break All-American.

Levesque ended her college career with 1,663 points, while becoming the school's leader in minutes played, free throws made, free throw percentage, while also being second in assists and three-pointers made.

== Professional career ==
During the WNBA's inaugural 1997 season, Levesque signed with the Charlotte Sting where she appeared in 27 games, averaging 4.0 points per game and 2.8 assists per game. She also played professionally in Europe.

== Coaching career ==
Returning to her native Vermont, Levesque was an assistant coach for two seasons at Vermont under Keith Cieplicki, and was part of the staff that won the America East Conference title and participated in the 2000 NCAA tournament.

== Personal ==
Levesque is a member of the Vermont Sports Hall of Fame, Vermont Principal's Association Hall of Fame and New England Basketball Hall of Fame. She and her husband, Dr. Mark Andres reside in Pensacola, Florida.

== Career statistics ==
Legend
GP	Games played	GS	Games started	MPG	Minutes per game	RPG	Rebounds per game
APG	Assists per game	SPG	Steals per game	BPG	Blocks per game	PPG	Points per game
TO	Turnovers per game	FG%	Field-goal percentage	3P%	3-point field-goal percentage	FT%	Free-throw percentage
**Bold**	Career best	°	League leader

=== WNBA ===
==== Regular season ====
Year	Team	GP	GS	MPG	FG%	3P%	FT%	RPG	APG	SPG	BPG	TO	PPG
1997	Charlotte	21	21	23.0	.367	.348	.933	1.7	2.8	.8	.1	2.6	4.0

==== Playoffs ====
Year	Team	GP	GS	MPG	FG%	3P%	FT%	RPG	APG	SPG	BPG	TO	PPG
1997	Charlotte	1	1	30.0	.500	.500	–	1.0	3.0	.0	.0	2.0	3.0

=== College ===
Year	Team	GP	GS	MPG	FG%	3P%	FT%	RPG	APG	SPG	BPG	TO	PPG
1990–91	Wake Forest	**28**	-	-	**39.3**	**42.9**	86.1	**4.8**	3.7	1.8	0.0	-	13.2
1991–92	Wake Forest	**28**	-	-	35.9	28.8	80.9	4.6	4.2	**2.5**	**0.1**	-	**17.3**
1992–93	Wake Forest	**28**	-	-	39.6	33.6	78.4	2.6	4.0	1.8	0.0	-	13.7
1993–94	Wake Forest	27	-	-	38.8	36.5	**87.2**	3.7	**5.8**	1.9	0.0	-	15.7
**Career**		111	-	-	38.2	35.1	83.0	3.9	4.4	2.0	0.0	-	15.0
Statistics retrieved from Sports-Reference.
