= Debra Williams =

Debra Williams may refer to:

- Debra Marshall (born 1960), formerly Williams, American actress and wrestler
- Debra Williams (basketball) (born 1972), basketball player
