= Ryan Davis (basketball) =

American basketball player (born 2000)

Personal information
- Born: January 20, 2000 (age 26)
- Listed height: 6 ft 8 in (2.03 m)
- Listed weight: 250 lb (113 kg)

Career information
- High school: James B. Conant (Hoffman Estates, Illinois)
- College: Vermont (2018–2022)
- NBA draft: 2022: undrafted
- Playing career: 2022–2022
- Position: Power forward

Career history
- 2022: Landstede Hammers

Career highlights
- 2× America East Player of the Year (2021, 2022); 2× First-team All-America East (2021, 2022); America East Sixth Man of the Year (2020)

Ryan Davis (born January 20, 2000) is an American former professional basketball player. He played college basketball for the Vermont Catamounts and was named the America East Player of the Year in 2021 and 2022.

== High school career ==
Davis attended James B. Conant High School in Hoffman Estates, Illinois. As a senior, he averaged 25 points and 11 rebounds per game. Davis left as his school's all-time leading scorer with 1,536 points. He committed to playing college basketball for Vermont.

== College career ==
Davis averaged 3.3 points in 10.2 minutes per game as a freshman at Vermont. He suffered from plantar fasciitis during the season. In the offseason, Davis improved his quickness by losing 25 pounds (11 kg). As a sophomore, he averaged 9.5 points and 4.4 rebounds per game, earning America East Sixth Man of the Year honors. In his junior season, Davis moved into a leading role with the departures of Anthony Lamb and other key seniors. On December 28, 2020, he scored 27 points, shooting 11-of-14 from the field, in an 81–80 loss to NJIT in double overtime. On February 25, 2021, Davis was named the America East Player of the Year. He averaged 18.5 points and 6.3 rebounds per game as a junior. Davis was again named America East Player of the Year as a senior.

== Professional career ==
On July 8, 2022, Davis signed his first professional contract with Dutch club Landstede Hammers of the BNXT League.

== Career statistics ==
Legend
GP	Games played	GS	Games started	MPG	Minutes per game
FG%	Field goal percentage	3P%	3-point field goal percentage	FT%	Free throw percentage
RPG	Rebounds per game	APG	Assists per game	SPG	Steals per game
BPG	Blocks per game	PPG	Points per game	**Bold**	Career high

=== College ===
Year	Team	GP	GS	MPG	FG%	3P%	FT%	RPG	APG	SPG	BPG	PPG
2018–19	Vermont	24	2	10.2	.388	.214	**.923**	1.8	.3	.0	.3	3.3
2019–20	Vermont	**31**	3	20.0	.530	.302	.830	4.4	.5	.4	.5	9.5
2020–21	Vermont	13	**13**	**27.2**	.586	.415	.810	**6.3**	1.1	**.5**	.6	**18.5**
2021–22	Vermont	30	**30**	26.4	**.593**	**.441**	.771	5.6	**1.3**	.2	**.8**	17.3
Career		98	48	20.5	.554	.372	.803	4.4	.8	.3	.5	11.6
