= 2020–21 Albany Great Danes men's basketball team =

American college basketball season

2020–21 Albany Great Danes men's basketball
- Conference: America East Conference
- Record: 7–9 (6–6 America East)
- Head coach: Will Brown (20th season)
- Assistant coaches: Jon Iati; Josh Pelletier; Jerrad Knotts
- Home arena: SEFCU Arena

2020–21 America East Conference men's basketball standings
	Conf.				Overall
Team	W		L	PCT	W		L	PCT
UMBC	10	–	4	.714	14	–	6	.700
Vermont	10	–	4	.714	10	–	5	.667
New Hampshire	9	–	6	.600	10	–	9	.526
Hartford †	8	–	6	.571	15	–	9	.625
Albany	6	–	6	.500	7	–	9	.438
UMass Lowell	7	–	8	.467	11	–	12	.478
Stony Brook	7	–	9	.438	9	–	14	.391
NJIT	6	–	10	.375	7	–	12	.368
Binghamton	4	–	10	.286	4	–	14	.222
Maine	2	–	6	.250	2	–	7	.222
† 2021 AmEast tournament winner Maine suspended its season on February 13, 2021.

The 2020–21 Albany Great Danes men's basketball team represented University at Albany, SUNY in the 2020–21 NCAA Division I men's basketball season. They played their home games at the SEFCU Arena in Albany, New York and were led by 20th-year head coach Will Brown. They finished the season 7–9, 6–6 in America East play, to finish in fifth place. They lost in the quarterfinals of the America East tournament to Hartford. Following the season, Brown and Albany mutually agreed to part ways after 20 seasons.

== Previous season ==
The Great Danes finished the 2019–20 season 14–18, 7–9 in America East play, to finish in seventh place. They lost in the quarterfinals of the America East tournament to Stony Brook.

== Roster ==
2020–21 Albany Great Danes men's basketball team
Players
Coaches

Pos.	#	Name	Height	Weight	Year	Previous school	Hometown
G	0	Antonio Rizzuto	6 ft 3 in (1.91 m)	195 lb (88 kg)	Jr	Northeastern HS	York, PA
G	1	Will Amica	6 ft 0 in (1.83 m)	170 lb (77 kg)	Fr	West Genesee HS	Syracuse, NY
G/F	2	Trey Hutcheson	6 ft 5 in (1.96 m)	195 lb (88 kg)	So	Linn-Mar HS	Marion, IA
G	3	JoJo Anderson	6 ft 3 in (1.91 m)	190 lb (86 kg)	RS Sr	22ft Academy; Nevada	Houston, TX
F	4	Jarvis Doles	6 ft 9 in (2.06 m)	215 lb (98 kg)	Sr	Hammond HS; Drexel	Baltimore, MD
G	5	Jamel Horton	6 ft 4 in (1.93 m)	190 lb (86 kg)	Jr	Holy Cross HS; Pratt CC	Queens, NY
F	10	Brent Hank	6 ft 10 in (2.08 m)	265 lb (120 kg)	RS So	Trinity College Senior	Port Lincoln, Australia
G	11	Cameron Healy	6 ft 3 in (1.91 m)	190 lb (86 kg)	RS Jr	Montverde Academy	Sydney, Australia
F	12	Kellon Taylor	6 ft 6 in (1.98 m)	215 lb (98 kg)	Sr	DeMatha Catholic HS; Duquesne	Landover, MD
F	14	Adam Lulka	6 ft 8 in (2.03 m)	245 lb (111 kg)	RS Jr	The King's School	Sydney, Australia
G	15	CJ Kelly	6 ft 5 in (1.96 m)	190 lb (86 kg)	Jr	Queens HS of Teaching	Long Island, NY
G/F	23	Sam Shafer	6 ft 6 in (1.98 m)	200 lb (91 kg)	RS So	Lincoln-Way East HS	Frankfort, IL
G	30	Chuck Champion	6 ft 4 in (1.93 m)	185 lb (84 kg)	Sr	Friends' Central School; Loyola (MD)	Philadelphia, PA
F	32	Will Kondrat	6 ft 7 in (2.01 m)	200 lb (91 kg)	So	Lincoln HS; Niagara County CC	Brooklyn, NY
G	33	Jackson Brown	6 ft 3 in (1.91 m)	185 lb (84 kg)	RS Fr	Catholic Central HS	Latham, NY

Head coach

- Will Brown (Dowling)

Assistant coach(es)

- Jon Iati (Albany)
- Josh Pelletier (Saint Rose)
- Jerrad Knotts (Albany)

Legend

- (C) Team captain
- (S) Suspended
- (I) Ineligible
- (W) Walk-on
- Injured
- Current redshirt

Roster
Last update: November 30, 2020

== Schedule and results ==
Date time, TV	Rank^{#}	Opponent^{#}	Result	Record	Site (attendance) city, state
Regular season
December 19, 2020; 4:00 p.m., ESPN3		UMBC	L 64–65	0–1 (0–1)	SEFCU Arena; Albany, NY
December 20, 2020; 2:00 p.m., ESPN3		UMBC	L 60–65	0–1 (0–2)	SEFCU Arena; Albany, NY
December 22, 2020*; 3:00 p.m., ESPN+		Niagara	L 65–70	0–3	SEFCU Arena; Albany, NY
January 2, 2021; 6:00 p.m., ESPN3		at Vermont	W 63–62	1–3 (1–2)	Patrick Gym; Burlington, VT
January 3, 2021; 4:00 p.m., ESPN+		Vermont	L 66–74	1–4 (1–3)	Patrick Gym; Burlington, VT
January 9, 2021*; 6:00 p.m., NBCSN		at Saint Joseph's	L 64–67	1–5	Hagan Arena; Philadelphia, PA
January 16, 2021; 5:00 p.m., ESPN+		NJIT	W 83–75	2–5 (2–3)	SEFCU Arena; Albany, NY
January 17, 2021; 5:00 p.m., ESPN+		NJIT	W 83–71	3–5 (3–3)	SEFCU Arena; Albany, NY
January 23, 2021; 2:00 p.m., ESPN3		at New Hampshire	L 64–71	3–6 (3–4)	Lundholm Gym; Durham, NH
January 24, 2021; 2:00 p.m., ESPN3		at New Hampshire	W 83–64	4–6 (4–4)	Lundholm Gym; Durham, NH
February 12, 2021; 7:00 p.m., ESPN3		UMass Lowell	L 71–79	4–7 (4–5)	SEFCU Arena; Albany, NY
February 13, 2021; 3:00 p.m., ESPN3		UMass Lowell	W 81–69	5–7 (5–5)	SEFCU Arena; Albany, NY
February 20, 2021; 4:00 p.m., ESPN3		Stony Brook	L 43–59	5–8 (5–6)	SEFCU Arena; Albany, NY
February 21, 2021; 2:00 p.m., ESPN3		Stony Brook	W 67–59	6–8 (6–6)	SEFCU Arena; Albany, NY
America East tournament
February 27, 2021; 5:00 p.m., ESPN+	(5)	(8) NJIT; First round	W 76–66	7–8	Chase Arena at Reich Family Pavilion; West Hartford, CT
February 28, 2021; 3:00 p.m., ESPN+	(5)	(4) Hartford; Quarterfinals	L 77–83	7–9	Chase Arena at Reich Family Pavilion; West Hartford, CT
*Non-conference game. ^{#}Rankings from AP poll. (#) Tournament seedings in parentheses. All times are in Eastern.
