= 2020–21 Binghamton Bearcats men's basketball team =

American college basketball season

2020–21 Binghamton Bearcats men's basketball
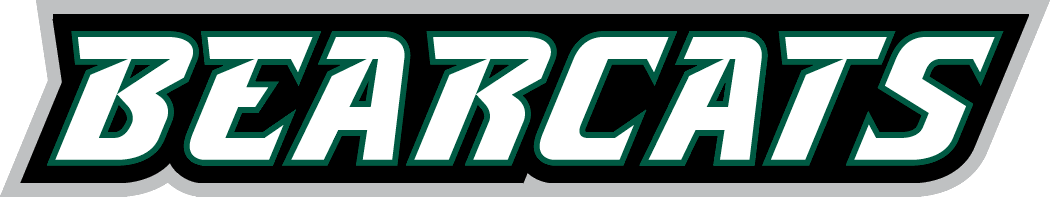
- Conference: America East Conference
- Record: 4–14 (4–10 America East)
- Head coach: Tommy Dempsey (9th season)
- Assistant coaches: Bryan Goodman; Levell Sanders; Brian Johnson
- Home arena: Binghamton University Events Center

2020–21 America East Conference men's basketball standings
	Conf.				Overall
Team	W		L	PCT	W		L	PCT
UMBC	10	–	4	.714	14	–	6	.700
Vermont	10	–	4	.714	10	–	5	.667
New Hampshire	9	–	6	.600	10	–	9	.526
Hartford †	8	–	6	.571	15	–	9	.625
Albany	6	–	6	.500	7	–	9	.438
UMass Lowell	7	–	8	.467	11	–	12	.478
Stony Brook	7	–	9	.438	9	–	14	.391
NJIT	6	–	10	.375	7	–	12	.368
Binghamton	4	–	10	.286	4	–	14	.222
Maine	2	–	6	.250	2	–	7	.222
† 2021 AmEast tournament winner Maine suspended its season on February 13, 2021.

The 2020–21 Binghamton Bearcats men's basketball team represented Binghamton University in the 2020–21 NCAA Division I men's basketball season. They played their home games at the Binghamton University Events Center in Vestal, New York and were led by ninth-year head coach Tommy Dempsey. In a season limited due to the ongoing COVID-19 pandemic, they finished the season 4–14, 4–10 in America East play to finish in ninth place. They lost to Hartford in the first round of the America East tournament.

== Previous season ==
The Bearcats finished the 2019–20 season 10–19, 4–12 in America East play to finish in last place. As a result, they failed to qualify for the America East tournament.

== Roster ==
2020–21 Binghamton Bearcats men's basketball team
Players
Coaches

Pos.	#	Name	Height	Weight	Year	Previous school	Hometown
F	0	Bryce Beamer	6 ft 6 in (1.98 m)	225 lb (102 kg)	So	Sickles HS; College of Central Florida	Tampa, FL
G	1	Hakon Hjalmarsson	6 ft 3 in (1.91 m)	175 lb (79 kg)	So	Menntaskolinn Vid Sunday	Reykjavík, Iceland
G	2	Brenton Mills	6 ft 3 in (1.91 m)	185 lb (84 kg)	So	Allen HS	Allen, TX
G	3	Hunter Christ	6 ft 3 in (1.91 m)	190 lb (86 kg)	GS	Don Bosco Prep; Green Bay	Cicero, IN
G	4	Kellen Amos	6 ft 6 in (1.98 m)	180 lb (82 kg)	Fr	St. John's XXIII Prep	Houston, Texas
G	5	Tommy Dempsey	6 ft 3 in (1.91 m)	180 lb (82 kg)	RS Fr	Seton Catholic Central; Providence	Binghamton, NY
G	10	Leo Gallagher	5 ft 10 in (1.78 m)	170 lb (77 kg)	RS Jr	Seton Catholic Central HS	Binghamton, NY
G	11	Dan Petcash	6 ft 4 in (1.93 m)	190 lb (86 kg)	So	Pine-Richland HS	Pittsburgh, PA
G	12	Christian Hinckson	6 ft 7 in (2.01 m)	210 lb (95 kg)	Jr	John Bowne HS; Manhattan	Queens, NY
C	15	Ador Athuai	6 ft 11 in (2.11 m)	190 lb (86 kg)	So	The Knox School	Twic, South Sudan
F	20	George Tinsley	6 ft 6 in (1.98 m)	200 lb (91 kg)	So	Abington Heights HS	Clarks Summit, PA
F	21	Ogheneyole Akuwovo	6 ft 9 in (2.06 m)	230 lb (104 kg)	RS So	Ranney School; Howard	Delta State, Nigeria
G	22	Alex Brodsky	6 ft 5 in (1.96 m)	200 lb (91 kg)	Jr	Dwight-Englewood School	Woodcliff Lake, NJ
F/C	32	Thomas Bruce	6 ft 9 in (2.06 m)	220 lb (100 kg)	Sr	DeMatha Catholic HS	Washington, D.C.
C	44	Yarden Willis	7 ft 0 in (2.13 m)	230 lb (104 kg)	Jr	The Weber School; Seward County CC	Roswell, GA

Head coach

- Tommy Dempsey (Susquehanna)

Assistant coach(es)

- Bryan Goodman (Barat)
- Levell Sanders (Seton Hall)
- Brian Johnson (Delaware)

Legend

- (C) Team captain
- (S) Suspended
- (I) Ineligible
- (W) Walk-on
- Injured
- Current redshirt

Roster
Last update: December 1, 2020

== Schedule and results ==
Due to the ongoing COVID-19 pandemic, the Bearcats' schedule is subject to change, including the cancellation or postponement of individual games, the cancellation of the entire season, or games played either with minimal fans or without fans in attendance and just essential personnel.

- The game vs. Robert Morris scheduled for December 12 was cancelled due to COVID-19 issues.
- The game vs. Central Connecticut scheduled for December 22 was cancelled due to COVID-19 issues.
- The two-game series vs. Maine scheduled for January 23–24 was postponed due to COVID-19 issues within the Maine program.
- The AEC scheduled a series vs. NJIT to replace the postponed series, but that series itself was eventually postponed due to COVID-19 issues within the Binghamton program.
- The two-game series vs. NJIT scheduled for February 6–7 as well as the two-game series vs. Maine scheduled for February 13–14 were postponed because the Binghamton program paused all team activities due to COVID-19 issues.

Date time, TV	Rank^{#}	Opponent^{#}	Result	Record	Site (attendance) city, state
Non-conference regular season
December 5, 2020*; 2:00 pm, ESPN3		Marist	L 65–68 ^{OT}	0–1	Binghamton University Events Center; Vestal, NY
December 6, 2020*; 4:00 pm, ESPN+		at Marist	L 60–64	0–2	McCann Arena; Poughkeepsie, NY
December 12, 2020*; 2:00 pm		Robert Morris	Canceled due to COVID-19 issues		Binghamton University Events Center; Vestal, NY
December 13, 2020*; 1:00 pm, ESPN3		Youngstown State	L 65–79	0–3	Binghamton University Events Center; Vestal, NY
America East regular season
December 19, 2020; 2:00 pm, ESPN3		Stony Brook	L 59–73	0–4 (0–1)	Binghamton University Events Center; Vestal, NY
December 20, 2020; 2:00 pm, ESPN3		Stony Brook	L 70–80 ^{OT}	0–5 (0–2)	Binghamton University Events Center; Vestal, NY
December 22, 2020*; 4:00 pm		Central Connecticut	Cancelled due to COVID-19 issues		Binghamton University Events Center; Vestal, NY
December 27, 2020; 1:00 pm, ESPN3		at UMBC	L 67–74	0–6 (0–3)	UMBC Event Center; Catonsville, MD
December 28, 2020; 1:00 pm, ESPN3		at UMBC	W 75–69	1–6 (1–3)	UMBC Event Center; Catonsville, MD
January 2, 2021; 2:00 pm, ESPN3		at Hartford	L 56–76	1–7 (1–4)	Chase Arena at Reich Family Pavilion; West Hartford, CT
January 3, 2021; 2:00 pm, ESPN+		at Hartford	L 74–77	1–8 (1–5)	Chase Arena at Reich Family Pavilion; West Hartford, CT
January 9, 2021; 2:00 pm, ESPN+		Vermont	L 60–76	1–9 (1–6)	Binghamton University Events Center; Vestal, NY
January 10, 2021; 2:00 pm, ESPN+		Vermont	L 44–84	1–10 (1–7)	Binghamton University Events Center; Vestal, NY
January 16, 2021; 2:00 pm, ESPN3		UMass Lowell	L 78–92	1–11 (1–8)	Binghamton University Events Center; Vestal, NY
January 17, 2021; 12:00 pm, ESPN3		UMass Lowell	L 67–77	1–12 (1–9)	Binghamton University Events Center; Vestal, NY
January 23, 2021; 1:00 pm, ESPN3		at Maine	Canceled due to COVID-19 issues		Memorial Gymnasium; Orono, ME
January 24, 2021; 1:00 pm, ESPN3		at Maine	Canceled due to COVID-19 issues		Memorial Gymnasium; Orono, ME
January 30, 2021; 2:00 pm, ESPN3		New Hampshire	W 65–44	2–12 (2–9)	Binghamton University Events Center; Vestal, NY
January 31, 2021; 2:00 pm, ESPN3		New Hampshire	L 65–71 ^{OT}	2–13 (2–10)	Binghamton University Events Center; Vestal, NY
February 20, 2021; 4:00 pm, ESPN3		at NJIT	W 76–63	3–13 (3–10)	Wellness and Events Center; Newark, NJ
February 21, 2021; 3:00 pm, ESPN3		at NJIT	W 72–58	4–13 (4–10)	Wellness and Events Center; Newark, NJ
America East tournament
February 27, 2021; 2:00 pm, ESPN+	(9)	(4) Hartford; First round	L 60–77	4–14	Chase Arena at Reich Family Pavilion; West Hartford, CT
*Non-conference game. ^{#}Rankings from AP Poll. (#) Tournament seedings in parentheses. All times are in Eastern.
