= 2020–21 Hartford Hawks women's basketball team =

American college basketball season

2020–21 Hartford Hawks women's basketball
- Conference: America East Conference
- Head coach: Morgan Valley
- Home arena: Chase Arena at Reich Family Pavilion

2020–21 America East Conference women's basketball standings
| | Conf. | | | | Overall |
| Team | W | | L | PCT | W | | L | PCT |
|---|---|---|---|---|---|---|---|---|
| Maine | 13 | – | 2 | .867 | 17 | – | 3 | .850 |
| Stony Brook † | 11 | – | 3 | .786 | 15 | – | 6 | .714 |
| UMass Lowell | 10 | – | 6 | .625 | 12 | – | 9 | .571 |
| Albany | 5 | – | 7 | .417 | 7 | – | 11 | .389 |
| New Hampshire | 5 | – | 11 | .313 | 5 | – | 15 | .250 |
| NJIT | 4 | – | 9 | .308 | 4 | – | 14 | .222 |
| Vermont | 4 | – | 2 | .667 | 4 | – | 2 | .667 |
| UMBC | 2 | – | 4 | .333 | 2 | – | 6 | .250 |
| Hartford | 3 | – | 9 | .250 | 3 | – | 9 | .250 |
| Binghamton | 5 | – | 9 | .357 | 5 | – | 11 | .313 |
† 2021 America East tournament winner Vermont suspended their season on January 24, 2021; UMBC suspended their season on January 29, 2021; Hartford suspended their season on February 10, 2021; Binghamton suspended their season on February 19, 2021; As of March 12, 2021; Rankings from AP poll

The 2020–21 Hartford Hawks women's basketball team represented the University of Hartford during the 2020–21 NCAA Division I women's basketball season. The Hawks, led by second-year head coach Morgan Valley, played their home games in the Chase Arena at Reich Family Pavilion in West Hartford, Connecticut and were members of the America East Conference.

== Schedule ==
| Date time, TV | Rank^{#} | Opponent^{#} | Result | Record | Site (attendance) city, state |
Non-conference regular season
| December 22, 2020; 1:00 p.m. | | Maine | L 57–85 | 0–1 (0–1) | Chase Arena at Reich Family Pavilion; West Hartford, CT |
| December 23, 2020; 1:00 p.m. | | Maine | L 49–52 | 0–2 (0–2) | Chase Arena at Reich Family Pavilion; West Hartford, CT |
| December 28, 2020; 3:00 p.m. | | New Hampshire | W 53–50 | 1–2 (1–2) | Chase Arena at Reich Family Pavilion; West Hartford, CT |
| December 29, 2020; 1:00 p.m. | | New Hampshire | W 64–57 | 2–2 (2–2) | Chase Arena at Reich Family Pavilion; West Hartford, CT |
| January 2, 2021; 3:00 p.m. | | at Binghamton | W 64–54 | 3–2 (3–2) | Binghamton University Events Center; Vestal, NY |
| January 3, 2021; 2:00 p.m. | | at Binghamton | L 44–52 | 3–3 (3–3) | Binghamton University Events Center; Vestal, NY |
| January 9, 2021; 1:00 p.m. | | UMass Lowell | L 45–81 | 3–4 (3–4) | Chase Arena at Reich Family Pavilion; West Hartford, CT |
| January 10, 2021; 1:00 p.m. | | UMass Lowell | L 52–74 | 3–5 (3–5) | Chase Arena at Reich Family Pavilion; West Hartford, CT |
| January 16, 2021 | | UMBC | Canceled | | Chase Arena at Reich Family Pavilion; West Hartford, CT |
| January 17, 2021 | | UMBC | Canceled | | Chase Arena at Reich Family Pavilion; West Hartford, CT |
| Jan 17, 2021; 2:00 pm | | at NJIT | L 51–65 | 3–6 (3–6) | Wellness and Events Center; Newark, NJ |
| Jan 18, 2021; 2:00 pm | | at NJIT | L 42–62 | 3–7 (3–7) | Wellness and Events Center; Newark, NJ |
| January 23, 2021 | | at Vermont | Canceled | | Patrick Gym; Burlington, VT |
| January 24, 2021 | | at Vermont | Canceled | | Patrick Gym; Burlington, VT |
| January 30, 2021; 1:00 pm, ESPN+ | | Stony Brook | L 47–77 | 3–8 (3–8) | Chase Arena at Reich Family Pavilion; West Hartford, CT |
| January 31, 2021; 1:00 pm, ESPN+ | | Stony Brook | L 49–62 | 3–9 (3–9) | Chase Arena at Reich Family Pavilion; West Hartford, CT |
| February 13, 2021; 7:00 p.m. | | at Albany | Canceled | | SEFCU Arena; Albany, NY |
| February 14, 2021 | | at Albany | Canceled | | SEFCU Arena; Albany, NY |
| February 20, 2021 | | at Binghamton | Canceled | | Chase Arena at Reich Family Pavilion; West Hartford, CT |
*Non-conference game. ^{#}Rankings from AP poll. (#) Tournament seedings in parentheses. All times are in Eastern.
