= 2020–21 Maine Black Bears men's basketball team =

American college basketball season

2020–21 Maine Black Bears men's basketball
- Conference: America East Conference
- Record: 2–7 (2–6 America East)
- Head coach: Richard Barron (3rd season)
- Assistant coaches: Kevin Reed; Edniesha Curry; Igor Vrzina
- Home arena: Memorial Gymnasium

2020–21 America East Conference men's basketball standings
	Conf.				Overall
Team	W		L	PCT	W		L	PCT
UMBC	10	–	4	.714	14	–	6	.700
Vermont	10	–	4	.714	10	–	5	.667
New Hampshire	9	–	6	.600	10	–	9	.526
Hartford †	8	–	6	.571	15	–	9	.625
Albany	6	–	6	.500	7	–	9	.438
UMass Lowell	7	–	8	.467	11	–	12	.478
Stony Brook	7	–	9	.438	9	–	14	.391
NJIT	6	–	10	.375	7	–	12	.368
Binghamton	4	–	10	.286	4	–	14	.222
Maine	2	–	6	.250	2	–	7	.222
† 2021 AmEast tournament winner Maine suspended its season on February 13, 2021.

The 2020–21 Maine Black Bears men's basketball team represented the University of Maine in the 2020–21 NCAA Division I men's basketball season. They played their home games at the Memorial Gymnasium in Orono, Maine and were led by third-year head coach Richard Barron. They were members of the America East Conference. On February 13, 2021, after not being cleared for competition or practice since January 17, the school opted out of the remainder of the season due to challenges due to the ongoing COVID-19 pandemic. They finished the season 2–7, 2–6 in America East play.

== Previous season ==
The Black Bears finished the 2019–20 season 9–22, 5–11 in America East play to finish in eighth place. They lost in the quarterfinals of the America East tournament to Vermont.

== Roster ==
2020–21 Maine Black Bears men's basketball team
Players
Coaches

Pos.	#	Name	Height	Weight	Year	Previous school	Hometown
F	0	Matthew Fleming	6 ft 6 in (1.98 m)	—	Fr	Bangor HS	Bangor, ME
G	1	Mykhailo Yagodin	6 ft 5 in (1.96 m)	195 lb (88 kg)	RS Jr	South Plains College	Odesa, Ukraine
G	2	Ja'Shonté Wright-McLeish	6 ft 4 in (1.93 m)	185 lb (84 kg)	So	Collège Jean-de-Brébeuf	Montreal, Canada
F	3	Vilgot Larsson	6 ft 8 in (2.03 m)	215 lb (98 kg)	Sr	Korrespondensgymnasiet; Hill College	Stockholm, Sweden
F	4	Ata Turgut	6 ft 9 in (2.06 m)	220 lb (100 kg)	So	TED Ankara Kolejliler	Ankara, Turkey
F	10	Stephane Ingo	6 ft 9 in (2.06 m)	200 lb (91 kg)	RS Fr	Gould Academy	Mississauga, Ontario
G	11	Lechaun Duhart	5 ft 11 in (1.8 m)	175 lb (79 kg)	Fr	Grandview HS; Western Wyoming CC	Aurora, CO
F	12	Veljko Radakovic	6 ft 9 in (2.06 m)	210 lb (95 kg)	So	Lee Academy	Novi Sad, Serbia
F	13	Miks Antoms	6 ft 8 in (2.03 m)	245 lb (111 kg)	Sr	Archbishop Carroll HS; Lee Academy	Riga, Latvia
G	14	Matias Prock	6 ft 2 in (1.88 m)	185 lb (84 kg)	Fr	Fork Union Military Academy	McLean, VA
G	15	Taylor Schildroth	6 ft 0 in (1.83 m)	175 lb (79 kg)	So	George Stevens Academy	Blue Hill, ME
G	21	Precious Okoh	6 ft 1 in (1.85 m)	188 lb (85 kg)	So	Bradford Christian Academy	Brockton, MA
F	22	Solomon Iluyomade	6 ft 7 in (2.01 m)	225 lb (102 kg)	RS Jr	Laramie County CC	London, England
G	25	Adefolalrin Adetogun	6 ft 1 in (1.85 m)	195 lb (88 kg)	Fr	Athol Murray College of Notre Dame	Regina, Saskatchewan
G	32	Randell Wiel	6 ft 3 in (1.91 m)	185 lb (84 kg)	Fr	Calandlyceum	Haarlem, Netherlands
F	35	Wol Maiwen	6 ft 4 in (1.93 m)	185 lb (84 kg)	Fr	Edward Little HS	Auburn, ME
F	44	Leyton Bickford	6 ft 6 in (1.98 m)	205 lb (93 kg)	Fr	Sanford HS	Sanford, ME

Head coach

- Richard Barron (Kenyon)

Assistant coach(es)

- Kevin Reed (Maine)
- Edniesha Curry (Oregon)
- Igor Vrzina (Abilene Christian)

Legend

- (C) Team captain
- (S) Suspended
- (I) Ineligible
- (W) Walk-on
- Injured
- Current redshirt

Roster
Last update: December 3, 2020

== Schedule and results ==
Date time, TV	Rank^{#}	Opponent^{#}	Result	Record	Site (attendance) city, state
Regular season
December 19, 2020; 2:00 pm, ESPN+		at Hartford	L 60–63	0–1 (0–1)	Chase Arena at Reich Family Pavilion; West Hartford, CT
December 20, 2020; 2:00 pm, ESPN+		at Hartford	L 50–65	0–2 (0–2)	Chase Arena at Reich Family Pavilion; West Hartford, CT
December 22, 2020*; 12:00 pm, ACCN		at Boston College	L 62–78	0–3	Conte Forum; Chestnut Hill, MA
January 2, 2021; 1:00 pm, ESPN+		New Hampshire	W 59–56	1–3 (1–2)	Memorial Gymnasium; Orono, ME
January 3, 2021; 1:00 pm, ESPN+		New Hampshire	L 58–62	1–4 (1–3)	Memorial Gymasium; Orono, ME
January 9, 2021; 2:00 pm, ESPN+		at NJIT	L 53–64	1–5 (1–4)	Wellness and Events Center; Newark, NJ
January 10, 2021; 2:00 pm, ESPN3		at NJIT	W 45–41	2–5 (2–4)	Wellness and Events Center; Newark, NJ
January 16, 2021; 2:00 pm, ESPN+		at Vermont	L 30–65	2–6 (2–5)	Patrick Gym; Burlington, VT
January 17, 2021; 1:00 pm, ESPN3		at Vermont	L 60–88	2–7 (2–6)	Patrick Gym; Burlington, VT
*Non-conference game. ^{#}Rankings from AP Poll. (#) Tournament seedings in parentheses. All times are in Eastern.
