= 2021 America East men's basketball tournament =

- Classification: Division I
- Season: 2020–21
- Teams: 9
- Site: Campus sites
- Champions: Hartford (1st title)
- Winning coach: John Gallagher (1st title)
- MVP: Austin Williams (Hartford)
- Television: ESPN+ ESPN2

2020–21 America East Conference men's basketball standings
	Conf.				Overall
Team	W		L	PCT	W		L	PCT
UMBC	10	–	4	.714	14	–	6	.700
Vermont	10	–	4	.714	10	–	5	.667
New Hampshire	9	–	6	.600	10	–	9	.526
Hartford †	8	–	6	.571	15	–	9	.625
Albany	6	–	6	.500	7	–	9	.438
UMass Lowell	7	–	8	.467	11	–	12	.478
Stony Brook	7	–	9	.438	9	–	14	.391
NJIT	6	–	10	.375	7	–	12	.368
Binghamton	4	–	10	.286	4	–	14	.222
Maine	2	–	6	.250	2	–	7	.222
† 2021 AmEast tournament winner Maine suspended its season on February 13, 2021.

The 2021 America East Men's Basketball Conference tournament was the post-season men's basketball tournament for the America East Conference that began on February 27, 2021 and ended on March 13, 2021. Starting in the semifinals, all tournament games were played on the home arenas of the higher-seeded school. In Pod Play and the Quarterfinals, games were played at either New Hampshire or Hartford. The winner received the conference's automatic bid to the NCAA tournament.

== Seeds ==
All of the teams, except for Maine, in the conference standings qualified for the tournament. Maine cancelled their season after going 2–7, so they did not compete in the conference tournament. The teams were seeded by record in conference, with a tiebreaker system to seed teams with identical conference records.

Seed	School	AEC Record	Tiebreaker
1	UMBC	10–4	2–0 vs Albany
2	Vermont	10–4	1–1 vs Albany
3	New Hampshire	9–6	
4	Hartford	8–6	
5	Albany	6–6	
6	UMass Lowell	7–8	
7	Stony Brook	7–9	
8	NJIT	6–10	
9	Binghamton	4–10	

== Schedule ==
Game	Time	Matchup	Score	Television	Attendance
Pod Play – Saturday, February 27
1	1:00 pm	No. 6 UMass Lowell vs No. 7 Stony Brook (at New Hampshire)	64–62	ESPN+	0
2	2:00 pm	No. 9 Binghamton at No. 4 Hartford	60–77	ESPN+	0
3	5:00 pm	No. 8 NJIT vs No. 5 Albany (at Hartford)	66–76	ESPN+	0
Quarterfinals – Sunday, February 28
4	1:00 pm	No. 6 UMass Lowell at No. 3 New Hampshire	72–64	ESPN+	0
5	3:00 pm	No. 5 Albany at No. 4 Hartford	77–83	ESPN+	0
Semifinals – Saturday, March 6
6	2:00 pm	No. 6 UMass Lowell at No. 1 UMBC	79–77	ESPN+	
7	4:00 pm	No. 4 Hartford at No. 2 Vermont	71–65	ESPN+	
Championship – Saturday, March 13
8	11:00 am	No. 6 UMass Lowell at No. 4 Hartford	50–64	ESPN2	
Game times in ET. Rankings denote tournament seeding. All games hosted by higher-seeded team or at pod site.

== Bracket and results ==
Pod Play; Saturday, February 27, 2021; ESPN+
5	UMass Lowell	64
8	Stony Brook	62
3	Hartford	77
10	Binghamton	60
6	Albany	76
7	NJIT	66

Quarterfinals; Sunday, February 28, 2021; ESPN+
3	New Hampshire	64
6	UMass Lowell	72
4	Hartford	83
5	Albany	77

Semifinals; Saturday, March 6, 2021; ESPN3/ESPN+
1	UMBC	77
6	UMass Lowell	79
2	Vermont	65
4	Hartford	71

Championship; Saturday, March 13, 2021; ESPN2
6	UMass Lowell	50
4	Hartford	64

== Game summaries ==
=== Pod Play ===
ESPN+

February 27, 2021
1:00 pm EST

No. 7 Stony Brook Seawolves 62, No. 6 UMass Lowell River Hawks 64
Scoring by half: 43-29, 19-35
Pts: J. Rodriguez – 22; Rebs: M. Gueye – 13; Asts: J. McKenzie – 2	Pts: O. Noel – 23; Rebs: 2 tied – 4 Asts: 2 tied – 3

Lundholhm Gymnasium – Durham, NH
Attendance: 0 (COVID-19)
Referees: Kevin O'Connell, Andy O'Brien, Michael Fortunato

ESPN+

February 27, 2021
2:00 pm EST

No. 9 Binghamton Bearcats 60, No. 4 Hartford Hawks 77
Scoring by half: 24-34, 36-43
Pts: D. Petcash – 15; Rebs: H. Hjalmarsson – 7 Asts: 3 tied – 2	Pts: A. Williams – 29; Rebs: A. Williams – 15; Asts: 2 tied – 5

Chase Arena – West Hartford, CT
Attendance: 0 (COVID-19)
Referees: John Floyd, King Whetstone, Mike Kitts Jr.

ESPN+

February 27, 2021
5:00 pm EST

No. 8 NJIT Highlanders 66, No. 5 Albany Great Danes 76
Scoring by half: 23-39, 43-37
Pts: Z. Cooks – 26; Rebs: 3 tied – 4 Asts: M. Gray – 2	Pts: J. Doles – 21; Rebs: 2 tied – 6 Asts: J. Horton – 7

Chase Hall – West Hartford, CT
Attendance: 0 (COVID-19)
Referees: John Floyd, King Whetstone, Mike Kitts Jr.

== See also ==
- 2021 America East women's basketball tournament
- America East Conference men's basketball tournament
