= 2020–21 Hartford Hawks men's basketball team =

American college basketball season

2020–21 Hartford Hawks men's basketball

America East tournament champions

NCAA tournament, first round
- Conference: America East Conference
- Record: 15–9 (8–6 America East)
- Head coach: John Gallagher (11th season)
- Assistant coaches: Tom Devitt; Yolonzo Moore II; Tim Brooks
- Home arena: Chase Arena at Reich Family Pavilion

2020–21 America East Conference men's basketball standings
	Conf.				Overall
Team	W		L	PCT	W		L	PCT
UMBC	10	–	4	.714	14	–	6	.700
Vermont	10	–	4	.714	10	–	5	.667
New Hampshire	9	–	6	.600	10	–	9	.526
Hartford †	8	–	6	.571	15	–	9	.625
Albany	6	–	6	.500	7	–	9	.438
UMass Lowell	7	–	8	.467	11	–	12	.478
Stony Brook	7	–	9	.438	9	–	14	.391
NJIT	6	–	10	.375	7	–	12	.368
Binghamton	4	–	10	.286	4	–	14	.222
Maine	2	–	6	.250	2	–	7	.222
† 2021 AmEast tournament winner Maine suspended its season on February 13, 2021.

The 2020–21 Hartford Hawks men's basketball team represented the University of Hartford in the 2020–21 NCAA Division I men's basketball season. They played their home games at the Chase Arena at Reich Family Pavilion in West Hartford, Connecticut and were led by 11th-year head coach John Gallagher. They finished the season 15-9, 8-6 in America East Play to finish in 4th place. They defeated Binghamton, Albany, Vermont, and UMass Lowell to be champions the America East tournament. They received the America East’s automatic bid to the NCAA tournament for the first time where they lost in the first round to Baylor. This was their only time making the NCAA Tournament as a D1 school (the school would announce the demotion to D3 just 2 months later, making the move in 2023.)

== Previous season ==
The Hawks finished the 2019–20 season 18–15, 9–7 in America East play to finish in third place. They defeated UMass Lowell and Stony Brook to advance to the championship game of the America East tournament vs Vermont. However, the championship game, and all postseason tournaments, were cancelled amid the COVID-19 pandemic.

== Roster ==
2020–21 Hartford Hawks men's basketball team
Players
Coaches

Pos.	#	Name	Height	Weight	Year	Previous school	Hometown
F	0	Hunter Marks	6 ft 9 in (2.06 m)	190 lb (86 kg)	Jr	Wonthaggi Secondary College	Phillip Island, Australia
G	1	Briggs McClain	6 ft 4 in (1.93 m)	175 lb (79 kg)	Fr	St. Maria Goretti HS	Martinsville, WV
G	2	D.J. Mitchell	6 ft 0 in (1.83 m)	160 lb (73 kg)	So	St. Thomas More School	Englewood Cliffs, NJ
F	3	Jakub Dombek	6 ft 11 in (2.11 m)	210 lb (95 kg)	So	Get Better Academy; Colorado	Ostrava, Czech Republic
G	4	Moses Flowers	6 ft 3 in (1.91 m)	180 lb (82 kg)	So	Thayer Academy	Dorchester, MA
G	5	Cameron McCravy	6 ft 0 in (1.83 m)	170 lb (77 kg)	So	Combine Academy	Charlotte, NC
F	10	Nikola Colovic	6 ft 10 in (2.08 m)	225 lb (102 kg)	RS Jr	Beovuk 72	Belgrade, Serbia
G	11	PJ Henry	5 ft 10 in (1.78 m)	165 lb (75 kg)	So	Shadow Creek HS	Houston, TX
F	12	Miroslav Stafl	6 ft 10 in (2.08 m)	235 lb (107 kg)	So	Get Better Academy	Liberec, Czech Republic
F	14	Rastislav Sipkovsky	6 ft 6 in (1.98 m)	215 lb (98 kg)	Fr	Get Better Academy	Sereď, Slovakia
F	15	Thomas Webley	6 ft 10 in (2.08 m)	240 lb (109 kg)	Fr	Cashmere HS	Christchurch, New Zealand
G	20	Austin Williams	6 ft 4 in (1.93 m)	200 lb (91 kg)	RS Sr	Seton Hall Prep; Marist	Roseland, NJ
G	21	Matt Hobbs	6 ft 4 in (1.93 m)	200 lb (91 kg)	Sr	Impact Basketball Academy; New England	Anchorage, AK
G/F	22	AJ Gray	6 ft 4 in (1.93 m)	205 lb (93 kg)	Fr	Mercersburg Academy	Rochester, NY
G	23	Michael Dunne	6 ft 0 in (1.83 m)	190 lb (86 kg)	Jr	Matawan Regional HS	Matawan, NJ
G	25	Traci Carter	6 ft 1 in (1.85 m)	175 lb (79 kg)	GS	Life Center Academy; La Salle	Philadelphia, PA

Head coach

- John Gallagher (Saint Joseph's)

Assistant coach(es)

- Tom Devitt (Boston College)
- Yolonzo Moore II (Hartford)
- Tim Brooks (James Madison)

Legend

- (C) Team captain
- (S) Suspended
- (I) Ineligible
- (W) Walk-on
- Injured
- Current redshirt

Roster
Last update: December 1, 2020

== Schedule and results ==
Date time, TV	Rank^{#}	Opponent^{#}	Result	Record	Site (attendance) city, state
Non-conference regular season
November 27, 2020*; 8:00 pm, CBSSN		at UConn	L 57–69	0–1	Harry A. Gampel Pavilion; Storrs, CT
December 1, 2020*; 5:00 pm, ESPN2		vs. No. 12 Villanova; Bubbleville	L 53–87	0–2	Mohegan Sun Arena; Uncasville, CT
December 2, 2020*; 7:00 pm, ESPN3		at Fairfield	W 66–61	1–2	Alumni Hall; Fairfield, CT
December 4, 2020*; 6:00 pm		Central Connecticut; Rivalry	W 80–65	2–2	Chase Arena at Reich Family Pavilion; West Hartford, CT
December 7, 2020*; 4:00 pm, ESPN3		Fairfield	W 67–54	3–2	Chase Arena at Reich Family Pavilion; West Hartford, CT
December 19, 2020; 2:00 pm, ESPN3		Maine	W 63–60	4–2 (1–0)	Chase Arena at Reich Family Pavilion; West Hartford, CT
December 20, 2020; 2:00 pm, ESPN3		Maine	W 65–50	5–2 (2–0)	Chase Arena at Reich Family Pavilion; West Hartford, CT
December 27, 2020; 1:00 pm, ESPN+		at New Hampshire	L 69–77	5–3 (2–1)	Lundholm Gym; Durham, NH
December 28, 2020; 1:00 pm, ESPN3		at New Hampshire	L 51–53	5–4 (2–2)	Lundholm Gym; Durham, NH
January 2, 2021; 2:00 pm, ESPN3		Binghamton	W 76–56	6–4 (3–2)	Chase Arena at Reich Family Pavilion; West Hartford, CT
January 3, 2021; 2:00 pm, ESPN+		Binghamton	W 77–74	7–4 (4–2)	Chase Arena at Reich Family Pavilion; West Hartford, CT
January 9, 2021; 12:00 pm, ESPN3		at UMass Lowell	L 62–71	7–5 (4–3)	Costello Athletic Center; Lowell, MA
January 10, 2021; 1:00 pm, ESPN3		at UMass Lowell	W 75–58	8–5 (5–3)	Costello Athletic Center; Lowell, MA
January 16, 2021; 1:00 pm, ESPN3		at UMBC	W 70–63	9–5 (6–3)	UMBC Event Center; Catonsville, MD
January 17, 2021; 1:00 pm, ESPN3		at UMBC	L 49–57	9–6 (6–4)	UMBC Event Center; Catonsville, MD
January 30, 2021; 2:00 pm, ESPN+		at Stony Brook	W 59–57	10–6 (7–4)	Island Federal Credit Union Arena; Stony Brook, NY
January 31, 2021; 2:00 pm, ESPN3		at Stony Brook	L 49–63	10–7 (7–5)	Island Federal Credit Union Arena; Stony Brook, NY
February 13, 2021; 2:00 pm, ESPN3		NJIT	L 57–67	10–8 (7–6)	Chase Arena at Reich Family Pavilion; West Hartford, CT
February 14, 2021; 2:00 pm, ESPN3		NJIT	W 75–61	11–8 (8–6)	Chase Arena at Reich Family Pavilion; West Hartford, CT
America East tournament
February 27, 2021; 2:00 pm, ESPN+	(4)	(9) Binghamton; First round	W 77–60	12–8	Chase Arena at Reich Family Pavilion; West Hartford, CT
February 28, 2021; 3:00 pm, ESPN+	(4)	(5) Albany; Quarterfinals	W 83–77	13–8	Chase Arena at Reich Family Pavilion; West Hartford, CT
March 6, 2021; 4:00 pm, ESPN+	(4)	at (2) Vermont; Semifinals	W 71–65	14–8	Patrick Gym; Burlington, VT
March 13, 2021; 11:00 am, ESPN2	(4)	(6) UMass Lowell; Championship	W 64–50	15–8	Chase Arena at Reich Family Pavilion; West Hartford, CT
NCAA tournament
March 19, 2021; 2:30 pm, truTV	(16 S)	vs. (1 S) No. 3 Baylor; First Round	L 55–79	15–9	Lucas Oil Stadium; Indianapolis, IN
*Non-conference game. ^{#}Rankings from AP Poll. (#) Tournament seedings in parentheses. All times are in Eastern.
