= James P. Leddy =

American politician

Member of the Vermont Senate from the Chittenden Vermont Senate District district
- In office 1999–2007

Personal details
- Born: August 8, 1942 (age 83) Burlington, Vermont, U.S.
- Party: Democratic
- Spouse: Clorinda Jane Marro
- Education: Saint Michael's College; University of Ottawa (BA); Barry University (MSW)

James P. Leddy (born August 8, 1942) was a Democratic member of the Vermont State Senate, who represented the Chittenden senate district. James Leddy was first elected to the Vermont State Senate in 1998 and continued in that office through 2007.

== Biography ==
Leddy was born in Burlington, Vermont on August 8, 1942. He was the son of Bernard Leddy, who became a federal judge. After attending Rice Memorial High School, he went on to study at Saint Michael's College and the University of Ottawa where he earned a Bachelor of Arts degree in 1964. He received an M.S.W. from Barry University in 1973.
