= Mount Anthony Union High School =

Location
- 301 Park Street, Bennington, Vermont; United States; 42.8857°N 73.1917°W

Information
- Principal: Adam Carmichael
- Teaching staff: 70 (FTE)
- Grades: 9-12
- Enrollment: 1200 (2019–20)
- Student to teacher ratio: 12.84
- Colors: Red, white, blue
- Website: mauhs.svsu.org

Mount Anthony Union High School is the public high school serving Bennington, Vermont, as well as the towns of Shaftsbury, Woodford, and Pownal, Glastenbury, and Bennington County.

As of the 2023–2024 academic year, the school has about 1,200 students enrolled in grades 9-12 and has a faculty of nearly 130.

It is easily accessible from US Route 7, VT Route 279, and the Green Mountain Express Red Line bus.

Mount Anthony is the third-largest school in the state of Vermont. The average graduation rate is eighty-five percent. The school yearbook is officially known as the Patriot Ledger, and the school newsletter is called Mount Anthony Connections. Additionally, the school runs a bi-weekly sports newsletter, The Patriot Press, which reports on the school's athletic teams.

The sports teams in their athletic program are collectively known as the Patriots. Led by head coach Brian Coon, the Patriots wrestling team holds the national record for most consecutive state titles won as of 2025 (38). Under the guidance of 1st year head coaches Frank Gaudette and Corey Greene, Mt. Anthony won their 38th consecutive title, which is the longest current state championship streak in the country in wrestling.

The Mount Anthony Football team is also very successful being state champion runner-ups in the 1986–1987, 1992–1993 and 2021–2022 season and state champions in the 1974–1975, 1994–1995 and 2022–2023 seasons. The Patriots won the state championship in Division II by defeating Bellows Falls in double overtime. As of 10/4/2025 they play in Division I in the state of Vermont. They host home games at Spinelli Field.

The Southwest Tech campus is housed on the school's campus.

== Notable alumni ==
- Nicole Levesque, former Charlotte Sting (WNBA) guard
- Robert Plunkett, member of the Vermont Senate
