= Ienăchiță Văcărescu National College =

Romanian high school

Coordinates: 44°55′39″N 25°26′0″E

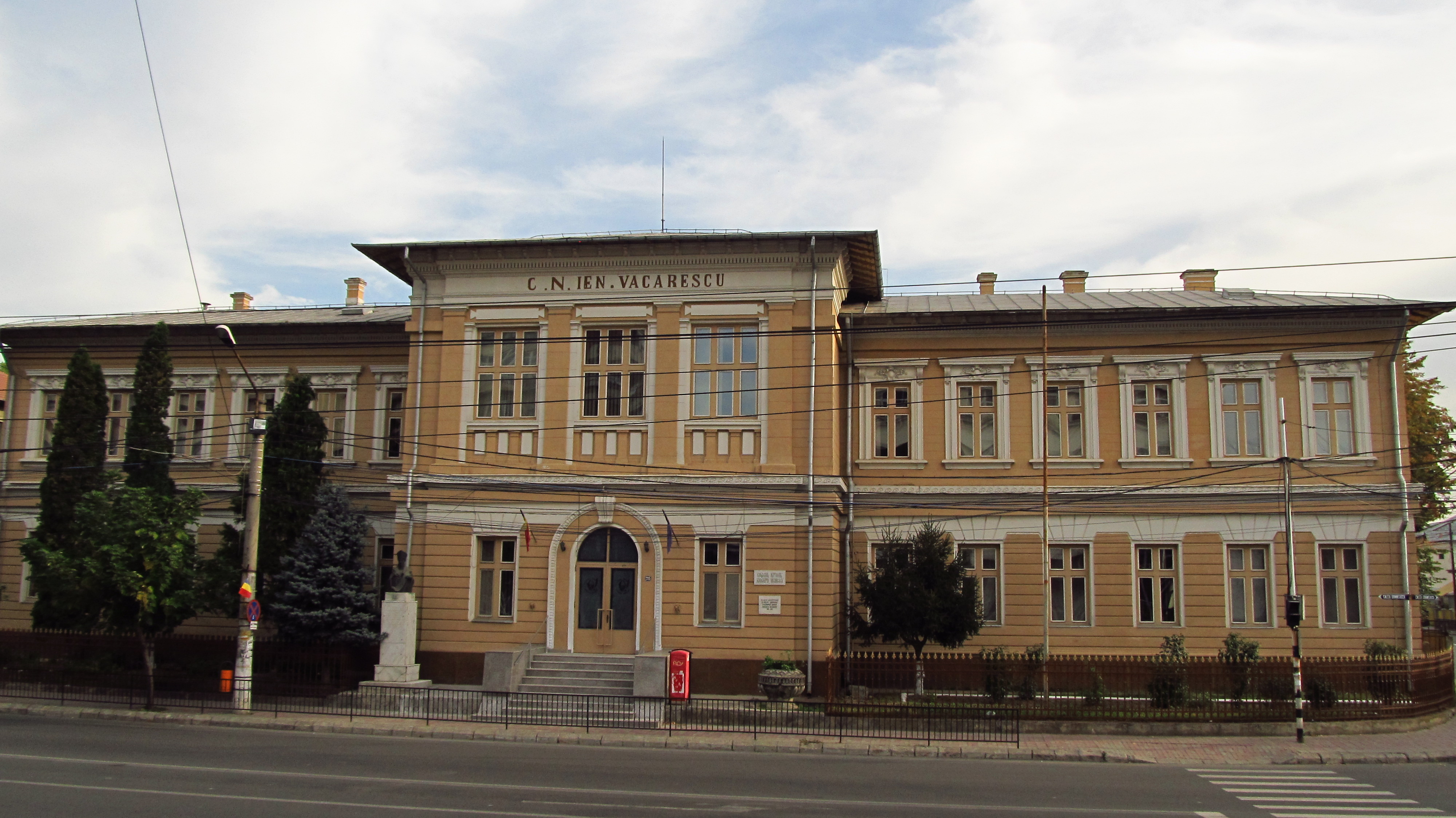
Ienăchiță Văcărescu National College

The Ienăchiță Văcărescu National College (Romanian: Colegiul Național Ienăchiță Văcărescu) is a high school located at 235 Calea Domnească, Târgoviște, Dâmbovița County, Romania. It was established at the end of the 19th century and is the oldest high school in the city. Previously a theoretical high school, it was declared a national college in 1999. The school is named after Romanian poet Ienăchiță Văcărescu
