= 2020–21 NJIT Highlanders men's basketball team =

American college basketball season

2020–21 NJIT Highlanders men's basketball
- Conference: America East Conference
- Record: 7–12 (6–10 America East)
- Head coach: Brian Kennedy (5th season)
- Assistant coaches: Jeff Rafferty; Kim Waiters; Joe Gutowski; Danny Manuel
- Home arena: Wellness and Events Center

2020–21 America East Conference men's basketball standings
	Conf.				Overall
Team	W		L	PCT	W		L	PCT
UMBC	10	–	4	.714	14	–	6	.700
Vermont	10	–	4	.714	10	–	5	.667
New Hampshire	9	–	6	.600	10	–	9	.526
Hartford †	8	–	6	.571	15	–	9	.625
Albany	6	–	6	.500	7	–	9	.438
UMass Lowell	7	–	8	.467	11	–	12	.478
Stony Brook	7	–	9	.438	9	–	14	.391
NJIT	6	–	10	.375	7	–	12	.368
Binghamton	4	–	10	.286	4	–	14	.222
Maine	2	–	6	.250	2	–	7	.222
† 2021 AmEast tournament winner Maine suspended its season on February 13, 2021.

The 2020–21 NJIT Highlanders men's basketball team represented the New Jersey Institute of Technology in the 2020–21 NCAA Division I men's basketball season. The Highlanders, led by fifth-year head coach Brian Kennedy, played their home games at the Wellness and Events Center in Newark, New Jersey as first-year members of the America East Conference. In a season limited by the ongoing COVID-19 pandemic, the Highlanders finished the season 7–12, 6–10 in America East play, to finish in eighth place. They lost to Albany in the first round of the America East tournament.

== Previous season ==
The Highlanders finished the 2019–20 season 9–21, 6–10 in ASUN play, to finish in eighth place. They lost in the quarterfinals of the ASUN tournament to Liberty.

This was the final season the Highlanders were a member of the ASUN Conference. On June 14, 2020, it was announced that they would become a full member of the America East Conference beginning July 1.

== Roster ==
2020–21 NJIT Highlanders men's basketball team
Players
Coaches

Pos.	#	Name	Height	Weight	Year	Previous school	Hometown
G	0	Adetokunbo Bakare	6 ft 2 in (1.88 m)	185 lb (84 kg)	Fr	St. Benedict's Prep	Newark, NJ
G	1	Dylan O'Hearn	6 ft 4 in (1.93 m)	185 lb (84 kg)	Jr	Carolina Basketball Academy; Western Oklahoma State CC	Westland, MI
F	2	San Antonio Brinson	6 ft 8 in (2.03 m)	210 lb (95 kg)	Sr	South Kent School	Thomson, GA
F	3	Miles Coleman	6 ft 5 in (1.96 m)	210 lb (95 kg)	Jr	William T. Dwyer HS; Indian River State College	West Palm Beach, FL
G	4	Zach Cooks	5 ft 10 in (1.78 m)	165 lb (75 kg)	Sr	Berkmar HS	Lawrenceville, GA
G	5	Diego Willis	6 ft 4 in (1.93 m)	180 lb (82 kg)	Jr	Canarias Basketball Academy	Hermosillo, Mexico
F	13	Jason Murphy	6 ft 8 in (2.03 m)	240 lb (109 kg)	RS Fr	St. Frances Academy	Owings Mills, MD
F	21	Souleymane Diakite	6 ft 9 in (2.06 m)	230 lb (104 kg)	Jr	Saint Benedict's Prep	Bamako, Mali
G	23	Antwuan Butler	6 ft 0 in (1.83 m)	205 lb (93 kg)	Jr	Cardinal O'Hara HS; Austin Peay	Philadelphia, PA
G	24	Mekhi Gray	6 ft 4 in (1.93 m)	180 lb (82 kg)	Fr	Putnam Science Academy	Montrose, NY
F	32	Xavier Mayo	6 ft 7 in (2.01 m)	230 lb (104 kg)	So	The Hill School	Beacon, NY
F	33	Kjell de Graaf	6 ft 10 in (2.08 m)	230 lb (104 kg)	Jr	Canarias Basketball Academy	Rotterdam, Netherlands
F	35	Da'mir Faison	6 ft 7 in (2.01 m)	200 lb (91 kg)	RS Fr	Hazleton Area HS	Philadelphia, PA

Head coach

- Brian Kennedy (Monmouth)

Assistant coach(es)

- Jeff Rafferty (Springfield)
- Kim Waiters (Robert Morris)
- Joe Gutowski (Roanoke)

Legend

- (C) Team captain
- (S) Suspended
- (I) Ineligible
- (W) Walk-on
- Injured
- Current redshirt

Roster
Last update: December 2, 2020

== Schedule and results ==
On November 25, 2020, NJIT paused activities following positive COVID-19 tests and canceled all non-conference games that the school had not yet announced.

Date time, TV	Rank^{#}	Opponent^{#}	Result	Record	Site (attendance) city, state
Regular season
December 19, 2020*; 4:30 p.m., ESPN+		at Temple	L 60–72	0–1	Liacouras Center; Philadelphia, PA
December 23, 2021*; 2:00 p.m., ESPN+		at Rider	W 81–66	1–1	Alumni Gymnasium; Lawrenceville, NJ
America East regular season
December 27, 2020; 2:00 p.m., ESPN+		at Vermont	L 78–92	1–2 (0–1)	Patrick Gym; Burlington, VT
December 28, 2020; 2:00 p.m., ESPN+		at Vermont	W 81–80 ^{2OT}	2–2 (1–1)	Patrick Gym; Burlington, VT
January 2, 2021; 3:00 p.m., ESPN3		at UMass Lowell	W 73–67	3–2 (2–1)	Costello Athletic Center; Lowell, MA
January 3, 2021; 1:00 p.m., ESPN3		at UMass Lowell	L 60–74	3–3 (2–2)	Costello Athletic Center; Lowell, MA
January 9, 2021; 2:00 p.m., ESPN+		Maine	W 63–54	4–3 (3–2)	Wellness and Events Center; Newark, NJ
January 10, 2021; 2:00 p.m., ESPN3		Maine	L 41–45	4–4 (3–3)	Wellness and Events Center; Newark, NJ
January 16, 2021; 5:00 p.m., ESPN+		at Albany	L 75–83	4–5 (3–4)	SEFCU Arena; Albany, NY
January 17, 2021; 5:00 p.m., ESPN+		at Albany	L 71–83	4–6 (3–5)	SEFCU Arena; Albany, NY
January 23, 2021; 2:00 p.m., ESPN+		Stony Brook	W 74–65	5–6 (4–5)	Wellness and Events Center; Newark, NJ
January 24, 2021; 2:00 p.m., ESPN+		Stony Brook	L 44–56	5–7 (4–6)	Wellness and Events Center; Newark, NJ
January 31, 2021; 12:00 p.m., ESPN3		UMBC	W 69–65	6–7 (5–6)	Wellness and Events Center; Newark, NJ
February 1, 2021; 2:00 p.m., ESPN+		UMBC	L 71–75	6–8 (5–7)	Wellness and Events Center; Newark, NJ
February 13, 2021; 2:00 p.m., ESPN3		at Hartford	W 67–57	7–8 (6–7)	Chase Arena at Reich Family Pavilion; West Hartford, CT
February 14, 2021; 2:00 p.m., ESPN3		at Hartford	L 61–75	7–9 (6–8)	Chase Arena at Reich Family Pavilion; West Hartford, CT
February 20, 2021; 4:00 p.m., ESPN3		Binghamton	L 63–76	7–10 (6–9)	Wellness and Events Center; Newark, NJ
February 21, 2021; 3:00 p.m., ESPN3		Binghamton	L 58–72	7–11 (6–10)	Wellness and Events Center; Newark, NJ
America East tournament
February 27, 2021; 5:00 p.m., ESPN+	(8)	(5) Albany; First round	L 66–76	7–12	Chase Arena at Reich Family Pavilion; West Hartford, CT
*Non-conference game. ^{#}Rankings from AP poll. (#) Tournament seedings in parentheses. All times are in Eastern.
