= 2020–21 Stony Brook Seawolves men's basketball team =

American college basketball season

2020–21 Stony Brook Seawolves men's basketball
- Conference: America East Conference
- Record: 9–14 (7–9 America East)
- Head coach: Geno Ford (2nd season)
- Assistant coaches: Bryan Weber; Dan Rickard; Randal Holt
- Home arena: Island Federal Credit Union Arena

2020–21 America East Conference men's basketball standings
	Conf.				Overall
Team	W		L	PCT	W		L	PCT
UMBC	10	–	4	.714	14	–	6	.700
Vermont	10	–	4	.714	10	–	5	.667
New Hampshire	9	–	6	.600	10	–	9	.526
Hartford †	8	–	6	.571	15	–	9	.625
Albany	6	–	6	.500	7	–	9	.438
UMass Lowell	7	–	8	.467	11	–	12	.478
Stony Brook	7	–	9	.438	9	–	14	.391
NJIT	6	–	10	.375	7	–	12	.368
Binghamton	4	–	10	.286	4	–	14	.222
Maine	2	–	6	.250	2	–	7	.222
† 2021 AmEast tournament winner Maine suspended its season on February 13, 2021.

The 2020–21 Stony Brook Seawolves men's basketball team represented Stony Brook University in the 2020–21 NCAA Division I men's basketball season. They played their home games at the Island Federal Credit Union Arena in Stony Brook, New York and were led by second-year head coach Geno Ford. They were members of the America East Conference. They finished the season 9–14, 7–9 in America East Play to finish in 7th place. In the America East tournament, they lost in the first round to UMass Lowell.

== Previous season ==
The Seawolves finished the 2019–20 season 20–13, 10–6 in America East play to finish in second place. They defeated Albany in the quarterfinals of the America East tournament before losing in the semifinals to Hartford.

== Offseason ==
=== Departures ===
Name	Number	Pos.	Height	Weight	Year	Hometown	Notes
Makale Foreman	1	G	6'1"	190	R-Junior	Kingsport, TN	Transferred to California
Miles Latimer	2	G	6'3"	190	Sophomore	Fairfax, VA	Transferred to Bucknell
Elijah Olaniyi	3	G	6'5"	205	Junior	Newark, NJ	Transferred to Miami (FL)
Jeff Otchere	4	C	6'11"	243	Junior	Bronx, NY	Transferred to Texas–Rio Grande Valley
Hassan Ceesay	11	G	6'4"	189	Sophomore	Newark, NJ	Transferred to Campbellsville
Quari Alleyne	12	F	6'2"	183	Junior	Ossining, NY	Graduated
Andrew Garcia	23	G/F	6'5"	228	R-Junior	Harlem, NY	Transferred to Georgia
Anthony Ochefu	35	F	6'8"	250	Junior	West Chester, PA	Transferred to Delaware

=== Incoming transfers ===
Name	Number	Pos.	Height	Weight	Year	Hometown	Previous School
Juwan White	1	G	6'2"	185	Junior	Dacula, GA	Transferred from Butler Community College
Leighton Elliott-Sewell	3	F	6'6"	187	Junior	Derby, England	Transferred from Otero Junior College
Tykei Greene	4	G	6'4"	205	Junior	Queens, NY	Transferred from Manhattan
Juan Felix Rodriguez	5	G	6'0"	190	Junior	Lawrence, MA	Transferred from Monroe College
Mohamed Diallo	11	F	6'6"	210	Junior	Harlem, NY	Transferred from Northeastern Junior College
Omar Habwe	13	F	6'6"	225	Senior	Lexington, VA	Transferred from Mount St. Mary's
Jaden Sayles	23	F	6'9"	235	Senior	Cincinnati, OH	Transferred from Akron

== Roster ==
2020–21 Stony Brook Seawolves men's basketball team
Players
Coaches

Pos.	#	Name	Height	Weight	Year	Previous school	Hometown
F	0	Frankie Policelli	6 ft 7 in (2.01 m)	215 lb (98 kg)	RS So	Long Island Lutheran HS; Dayton	New Hartford, NY
G	1	Juwan White	6 ft 2 in (1.88 m)	185 lb (84 kg)	Jr	Norman North HS; Butler CC	Dacula, GA
F	2	Mouhamadou Gueye	6 ft 9 in (2.06 m)	210 lb (95 kg)	Sr	Curtis HS; Monroe JC	Staten Island, NY
F	3	Leighton Elliott-Sewell	6 ft 6 in (1.98 m)	187 lb (85 kg)	Jr	Otero JC	Derby, England
G	4	Tykei Greene	6 ft 4 in (1.93 m)	205 lb (93 kg)	Jr	Long Island Lutheran HS; Manhattan	Queens, NY
G	5	Juan Felix Rodriguez	6 ft 0 in (1.83 m)	190 lb (86 kg)	Jr	Lawrence HS; Monroe JC	Lawrence, MA
G	10	Jordan McKenzie	6 ft 1 in (1.85 m)	190 lb (86 kg)	Sr	Hargrave Military Academy	Concord, NC
F	11	Mohamed Diallo	6 ft 6 in (1.98 m)	210 lb (95 kg)	Jr	Northeastern JC	Harlem, NY
G	13	Omar Habwe	6 ft 6 in (1.98 m)	225 lb (102 kg)	Sr	St. James School; Mount St. Mary's	Lexington, VA
G	14	Tyler Stephenson-Moore	6 ft 3 in (1.91 m)	186 lb (84 kg)	So	Long Island Lutheran HS	Jamaica, NY
G	15	Tavin Pierre Philippe	6 ft 3 in (1.91 m)	187 lb (85 kg)	So	Baldwin HS	Freeport, NY
C	21	Alex Christie	7 ft 0 in (2.13 m)	280 lb (127 kg)	So	The MacDuffie School	Oakville, Ontario
F	23	Jaden Sayles	6 ft 9 in (2.06 m)	235 lb (107 kg)	Sr	Sycamore HS; Akron	Cincinnati, OH
G	24	Lenny Kadisha	6 ft 4 in (1.93 m)	238 lb (108 kg)	Sr	Wadleigh HS; Monroe JC	Corona, NY

Head coach

- Geno Ford (Ohio)

Assistant coach(es)

- Bryan Weber (Akron)
- Dan Rickard (Stony Brook)
- Randal Holt (Kent State)

Legend

- (C) Team captain
- (S) Suspended
- (I) Ineligible
- (W) Walk-on
- Injured
- Current redshirt

Roster
Last update: September 14, 2019

== Schedule and results ==
Date time, TV	Rank^{#}	Opponent^{#}	Result	Record	Site (attendance) city, state
Non-conference regular season
November 25, 2020*; 1:00 pm		at Bryant	Canceled		Chace Athletic Center; Smithfield, RI
December 1, 2020*; 6:00 pm		Sacred Heart	Canceled		Island Federal Credit Union Arena; Stony Brook, NY
December 1, 2020*; 6:00 pm		vs. Saint Peter's	L 68–82	0–1	John J. Moore Athletics and Fitness Center; Jersey City, NJ
December 4, 2020*; 4:00 pm, ESPN3		Fairfield	W 72–69 ^{OT}	1–1	Island Federal Credit Union Arena; Stony Brook, NY
December 6, 2020*; 2:30 pm, FS1		at St. John's	L 66–89	1–2	Carnesecca Arena; Queens, NY
December 9, 2020*; 7:00 pm, FloHoops		at Hofstra	L 67–72	1–3	Mack Sports Complex; Hempstead, NY
December 12, 2020*; 4:00 pm, NEC Front Row		at Bryant	L 72–81	1–4	Chace Athletic Center; Smithfield, RI
December 15, 2020*; 1:00 pm, ESPN3		Point Park	W 83–39	2–4	Island Federal Credit Union Arena; Stony Brook, NY
America East Conference regular season
December 19, 2020; 2:00 pm, ESPN3		at Binghamton	W 73–59	3–4 (1–0)	Binghamton University Events Center; Vestal, NY
December 20, 2020; 2:00 pm, ESPN3		at Binghamton	W 80–70 ^{OT}	4–4 (2–0)	Binghamton University Events Center; Vestal, NY
December 22, 2020*; 1:00 pm		at Fordham	Canceled		Rose Hill Gymnasium; Bronx, NY
December 27, 2020; 5:00 pm, ESPN3		UMass Lowell	W 73–58	5–4 (3–0)	Island Federal Credit Union Arena; Stony Brook, NY
December 28, 2020; 2:00 pm, ESPN3		UMass Lowell	W 71–64	6–4 (4–0)	Island Federal Credit Union Arena; Stony Brook, NY
January 16, 2021; 2:00 pm, ESPN3		New Hampshire	L 64–81	6–5 (4–1)	Island Federal Credit Union Arena; Stony Brook, NY
January 17, 2021; 2:00 pm, ESPN3		New Hampshire	L 64–67	6–6 (4–2)	Island Federal Credit Union Arena; Stony Brook, NY
January 23, 2021; 2:00 pm, ESPN3		at NJIT	L 64–75	6–7 (4–3)	Wellness and Events Center; Newark, NJ
January 24, 2021; 2:00 pm, ESPN3		at NJIT	W 56–44	7–7 (5–3)	Wellness and Events Center; Newark, NJ
January 30, 2021; 2:00 pm, ESPN+		Hartford	L 57–59	7–8 (5–4)	Island Federal Credit Union Arena; Stony Brook, NY
January 31, 2021; 2:00 pm, ESPN3		Hartford	W 63–49	8–8 (6–4)	Island Federal Credit Union Arena; Stony Brook, NY
February 7, 2021; 1:00 pm, ESPN+		UMBC	L 65–71	8–9 (6–5)	Island Federal Credit Union Arena; Stony Brook, NY
February 8, 2021; 1:00 pm, ESPN3		UMBC	L 48–60	8–10 (6–6)	Island Federal Credit Union Arena; Stony Brook, NY
February 13, 2021; 2:00 pm, ESPN+		at Vermont	L 78–86	8–11 (6–7)	Patrick Gym; Burlington, VT
February 14, 2021; 12:00 pm, ESPN+		at Vermont	L 57–61	8–12 (6–8)	Patrick Gym; Burlington, VT
February 20, 2021; 4:00 pm, ESPN3		at Albany	W 59–43	9–12 (7–8)	SEFCU Arena; Albany, NY
February 21, 2021; 2:00 pm, ESPN3		at Albany	L 59–67	9–13 (7–9)	SEFCU Arena; Albany, NY
America East tournament
February 27, 2021; 2:00 pm, ESPN+	(7)	(6) UMass Lowell; First round	L 62–64	9–14	Lundholm Gym; Durham, NH
*Non-conference game. ^{#}Rankings from AP Poll. (#) Tournament seedings in parentheses. All times are in Eastern.

== See also ==
2019–20 Stony Brook Seawolves women's basketball team
