= 2020–21 UMass Lowell River Hawks men's basketball team =

American college basketball season

2020–21 UMass Lowell River Hawks men's basketball
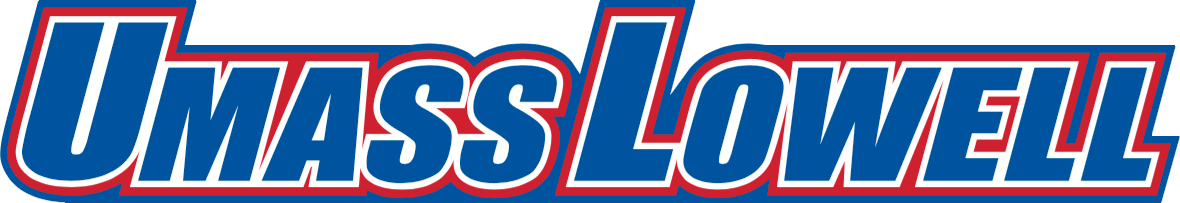
- Conference: America East Conference
- Record: 11–12 (7–8 America East)
- Head coach: Pat Duquette (8th season)
- Assistant coaches: Biko Paris; Nick Leonardelli; Louis Hinnant
- Home arena: Costello Athletic Center

2020–21 America East Conference men's basketball standings
	Conf.				Overall
Team	W		L	PCT	W		L	PCT
UMBC	10	–	4	.714	14	–	6	.700
Vermont	10	–	4	.714	10	–	5	.667
New Hampshire	9	–	6	.600	10	–	9	.526
Hartford †	8	–	6	.571	15	–	9	.625
Albany	6	–	6	.500	7	–	9	.438
UMass Lowell	7	–	8	.467	11	–	12	.478
Stony Brook	7	–	9	.438	9	–	14	.391
NJIT	6	–	10	.375	7	–	12	.368
Binghamton	4	–	10	.286	4	–	14	.222
Maine	2	–	6	.250	2	–	7	.222
† 2021 AmEast tournament winner Maine suspended its season on February 13, 2021.

The 2020–21 UMass Lowell River Hawks men's basketball team represented the University of Massachusetts Lowell in the 2020–21 NCAA Division I men's basketball season. They were led by eighth-year head coach Pat Duquette and played their home games at the Costello Athletic Center in Lowell, Massachusetts as members of the America East Conference. In a season limited due to the ongoing COVID-19 pandemic, the River Hawks finished the season 11–12, 7–9 in America East play, to finish in sixth place. They defeated Stony Brook, New Hampshire and UMBC to advance to the championship of the America East tournament. In the championship game, they lost to Hartford.

== Previous season ==
The River Hawks finished the 2019–20 season 13–19, 7–9 in America East play to finish in a tie for sixth place. They lost in the quarterfinals of the America East tournament to Hartford.

== Roster ==
2020–21 UMass Lowell River Hawks men's basketball team
Players
Coaches

Pos.	#	Name	Height	Weight	Year	Previous school	Hometown
G	0	Ron Mitchell	6 ft 3 in (1.91 m)	170 lb (77 kg)	So	Fairfax HS	Philadelphia, PA
G	1	Bryce Daley	6 ft 4 in (1.93 m)	190 lb (86 kg)	RS So	Salisbury School	Pittsfield, MA
G	2	Kalil Thomas	6 ft 4 in (1.93 m)	185 lb (84 kg)	So	Holy Cross HS	New Orleans, LA
G	3	Gregory Hammond	6 ft 6 in (1.98 m)	210 lb (95 kg)	So	Sophie B. Wright HS; Rhode Island	New Orleans, LA
F	4	Charlie Jr. Russell	6 ft 8 in (2.03 m)	200 lb (91 kg)	So	Sophie B. Wright HS; Tulane	New Orleans, LA
F	5	Connor Withers	6 ft 7 in (2.01 m)	195 lb (88 kg)	So	Osbourn HS	Manassas, VA
F	10	Max Brooks	6 ft 7 in (2.01 m)	205 lb (93 kg)	Fr	St. Charles HS	Waldorf, MD
G	11	Obadiah Noel	6 ft 4 in (1.93 m)	190 lb (86 kg)	Sr	Tuscarora HS	Frederick, MD
F	12	Darion Jordan-Thomas	6 ft 7 in (2.01 m)	210 lb (95 kg)	So	Proctor Academy; Wagner	Brockton, MA
G	14	Anthony Blunt	6 ft 2 in (1.88 m)	185 lb (84 kg)	Fr	St. Vincent Pallotti HS	Bowie, MD
F	15	Allin Blunt	6 ft 7 in (2.01 m)	205 lb (93 kg)	Jr	Gonzaga College HS	Crownsville, MD
G	21	Richie Greaves	6 ft 1 in (1.85 m)	178 lb (81 kg)	Fr	Roselle Catholic HS	Staten Island, NY
F	22	Caleb Bates	6 ft 7 in (2.01 m)	230 lb (104 kg)	Fr	Mt. Zion Prep	Detroit, MI
F	23	Salif Boudie	6 ft 8 in (2.03 m)	225 lb (102 kg)	GS	Quakerdale Prep; Arkansas State	Bamako, Mali

Head coach

- Pat Duquette (Williams)

Assistant coach(es)

- Biko Paris (Boston College)
- Nick Leonardelli (Dickinson)
- Louis Hinnant (Boston College)

Legend

- (C) Team captain
- (S) Suspended
- (I) Ineligible
- (W) Walk-on
- Injured
- Current redshirt

Roster
Last update: December 1, 2020

== Schedule and results ==
Date time, TV	Rank^{#}	Opponent^{#}	Result	Record	Site (attendance) city, state
Regular season
November 25, 2020*; 4:00 p.m.		vs. San Francisco; Mohegan Sun Bubbleville	W 76–68	1–0	Mohegan Sun Arena (0); Uncasville, CT
November 28, 2020*; 1:00 p.m.		vs. Illinois State	L 72–82	1–1	Covelli Center (0); Columbus, OH
November 29, 2020*; 12:00 p.m., BTN		at No. 23 Ohio State	L 64–74	1–2	Covelli Center (0); Columbus, OH
December 3, 2020*; 4:30 p.m., ESPNU		vs. NC State; Mohegan Sun Bubbleville	L 59–90	1–3	Mohegan Sun Arena (0); Uncasville, CT
December 9, 2020*; 7:00 p.m., NESN		at Northeastern; Canceled due to COVID-19 issues			Cabot Center; Boston, MA
December 21, 2020; 5:00 p.m., ESPN3		Vermont	W 73–65	2–3 (1–0)	Costello Athletic Center (0); Lowell, MA
December 22, 2020; 3:00 p.m., ESPN3		Vermont	L 53–62	2–4 (1–1)	Costello Athletic Center (0); Lowell, MA
December 27, 2020; 2:00 p.m., ESPN3		at Stony Brook	L 58–73	2–5 (1–2)	Island Federal Credit Union Arena (0); Stony Brook, NY
December 28, 2020; 2:00 p.m., ESPN3		at Stony Brook	L 64–71	2–6 (1–3)	Island Federal Credit Union Arena (0); Stony Brook, NY
January 2, 2021; 3:00 p.m., ESPN3		NJIT	L 67–73	2–7 (1–4)	Costello Athletic Center (0); Lowell, MA
January 3, 2021; 1:00 p.m., ESPN3		NJIT	W 74–60	3–7 (2–4)	Costello Athletic Center (0); Lowell, MA
January 9, 2021; 12:00 p.m., ESPN3		Hartford	W 71–62	4–7 (3–4)	Costello Athletic Center; Lowell, MA
January 10, 2021; 1:00 p.m., ESPN3		Hartford	L 58–75	4–8 (3–5)	Costello Athletic Center; Lowell, MA
January 16, 2021; 2:00 p.m., ESPN3		at Binghamton	W 92–78	5–8 (4–5)	Binghamton University Events Center; Vestal, NY
January 17, 2021; 12:00 p.m., ESPN3		at Binghamton	W 77–67	6–8 (5–5)	Binghamton University Events Center; Vestal, NY
February 5, 2021; 3:00 p.m., ESPN3		at New Hampshire	W 74–69	7–8 (6–5)	Lundholm Gym; Durham, NH
February 6, 2021; 1:00 p.m.		at New Hampshire	L 63–74	7–9 (6–6)	Lundholm Gym; Durham, NH
February 12, 2021; 7:00 p.m., ESPN3		at Albany	W 79–71	8–9 (7–6)	SEFCU Arena; Albany, NY
February 13, 2021; 3:00 p.m., ESPN3		at Albany	L 69–81	8–10 (7–7)	SEFCU Arena; Albany, NY
February 20, 2021; 1:00 p.m., ESPN3		New Hampshire	L 67–69	8–11 (7–8)	Costello Athletic Center; Lowell, MA
America East tournament
February 27, 2021; 1:00 p.m., ESPN+	(6)	(7) Stony Brook; First round	W 64–62	9–11	Lundholm Gym; Durham, NH
February 28, 2021; 1:00 p.m., ESPN+	(6)	at (3) New Hampshire; Quarterfinals	W 72–64	10–11	Lundholm Gym; Durham, NH
March 6, 2021; 2:00 p.m., ESPN+	(6)	at (1) UMBC; Semifinals	W 79–77	11–11	UMBC Event Center; Catonsville, MD
March 13, 2021; 11:00 a.m., ESPN2	(6)	at (4) Hartford; Championship	L 50–64	11–12	Chase Arena at Reich Family Pavilion; West Hartford, CT
*Non-conference game. ^{#}Rankings from AP poll. (#) Tournament seedings in parentheses. All times are in Eastern.
