= Rice Memorial High School =

Location
- 99 Proctor Avenue; South Burlington, Vermont 05403; United States; 44°27′10″N 73°12′1″W

Information
- Type: Parochial, Coeducational
- Religious affiliation: Roman Catholic
- Established: 1917
- Principal: Andy Nagy
- Faculty: 41
- Grades: 9–12
- Enrollment: Approximately 400 (2017-2018)
- Average class size: 20
- Student to teacher ratio: 13:1
- Colors: Green and White
- Athletics: 17 Interscholastic Sports
- Mascot: Green Knights
- Accreditation: New England Association of Schools and Colleges
- Newspaper: The Knights Banner
- Website: http://rmhsvt.org

Rice Memorial High School is a coeducational Roman Catholic secondary and college preparatory school in South Burlington, Vermont. It is located in the Roman Catholic Diocese of Burlington. The student body is mostly drawn from Northern and Central Vermont but includes other students including international students. The school and buildings were named for Bishop Joseph Rice who had established Cathedral High School in 1917.

== History ==
Rice Memorial High School was opened on February 1, 1959 by Bishop Robert Joyce. Previous to this the school was known as Cathedral High School, which had been founded in 1917, and was located in Burlington, Vermont. Rice Memorial High School was built to replace the decaying building of Cathedral High School. On the day it became Rice Memorial High School, 900 students marched from the old Cathedral High School to the new high school. The school equally recognizes the graduates of both schools, Cathedral/Rice, as a "joint" alumni.

Boys' basketball had a 54-6 record from the fall season of 2007 through January 2009. Its only losses were to Burlington High School. Burlington's only loss since the 2007 season had been to Rice, in the 2009 State Championship They played Burlington High School in consecutive seasons, 2007–09, for the Vermont State Division I championship's, winning in 2007-09. From 2007-14, the boys' basketball team played in 7 out of 8 finals, winning 5 state titles.

In 2009, a fire caused damage to the gymnasium.

== Academic ==
The school is accredited by the New England Association of Schools and Colleges.

== Students ==
The student body has approximately 400 students, approximately 2/3 of whom are Catholic. 21 courses are offered in the Honors and Advanced Placement programs. In 2006, 64% of students scored 3 or higher on Advanced Placement exams. 96% of students are accepted into four-year colleges.

== Faculty ==
The average faculty member has 17 years experience, and 68% of the faculty have advanced degrees.

== Tuition ==
Tuition for the 2025-2026 academic year is $13,900.

=== Principals ===
1. Msgr. Raymond Adams first Principal, 1959-1964

?

1. Msgr. Wendell Searles 1966-1975
2. Rev. Roland Rivard 1975-1982
3. Rev. Ronald Soutiere 1982
4. Mr. John Lemon 1982
5. Mr. Phillip Soltau 1982-1984
6. Bro. John Collignon 1984-1994
7. Bro. Roger Lemoyne 1994-1998
8. Mr. John McCarthy 1998-2003
9. Dr. Alan Crowley (1976) 2003-2006
10. Msgr. Bernie Bourgeois 2006-2016
11. Sister Laura Della Santa 2016-2017
12. Lisa Lorenz 2017–2022
13. Dr. Andrew Keough, Interim, 2022-2023
14. Mr. Andrew Nagy 2023–present

== Athletics ==
About 80% of the students participate in interscholastic athletics. There are 32 athletic teams that compete in 17 different sports. The school's prime rival is cross-town Burlington High School. Rice Memorial's mascot is the Green Knight.

In 2022, both the girls basketball and boys basketball won the division 1 state championship.

Rice Memorial boys basketball has won 19 Vermont state championships, including a championship in 2022 where they won without any seniors on their roster and one in 2024.

=== Recognition ===
State Championships:

- Division II Boys' Golf (2014)
- Division I Boys' Ice Hockey (1994, 1995, 2024, 2025)
- Division I Girls' Soccer (1999)
- Division I Boys' Baseball (1964, 2014, 2015)
- Division I Boys' Basketball (1968, 1970, 1971, 1980, 1985, 2000, 2007, 2009, 2011, 2013, 2014, 2015, 2020, 2022, 2024)
- Division I Girls' Basketball (1980, 1983, 1999, 2000, 2001, 2011, 2012)
- Division I Boys' Tennis (1984, 1987)
- Division I Girls' Field Hockey (2024)
- Division I Girls' Tennis (1985, 1988, 2008)
- Division II Boys' Soccer (1994, 2001, 2014)
- Division II Girls' Track & Field (1994)
- Division II Girls' Soccer (1989, 1997, 2019, 2021, 2022)
- Division II Boys' Track (2003)
- Division II Football (1983, 1988, 1989, 2010, 2012, 2013, 2014)
- Division III Football (2004)
- Division II Boys' Lacrosse (2005, 2011, 2022)
- Division III Boys' Swimming (2007)
- Division I Scholar's Bowl (1984, 1986)
- Division II Field Hockey (2014)
- Division III Field Hockey (2008, 2009, 2010)
- Division II Girls' Lacrosse (2012, 2013)
- Division II Girls' Indoor Track (2014, 2015, 2016, 2017, 2023)
- Division II Boys' Indoor Track (2015)
- Division II Girls' Golf (2022, 2023, 2024)

== Notable alumni ==
- James P. Leddy (Class of 1960), Vermont state senator, 1997-2007
- Johannah Leddy Donovan, (Class of 1962), member of the Vermont House of Representatives
- William Sorrell (Class of 1964), Vermont Attorney General, 1997-2017
- Elizabeth M. Ready (Class of 1971), Vermont Auditor of Accounts, 2001-2005
- Keith Cieplicki (Class of 1981), athlete and coach
- Dan Chiasson (Class of 1989), author and poet
- Christina E. Nolan (Class of 1997), United States Attorney for Vermont
- Michael Hastings (Class of 1998), journalist and author
- Morgan Valley (Class of 2000), Basketball coach
