= UMBC Retrievers men's basketball statistical leaders =

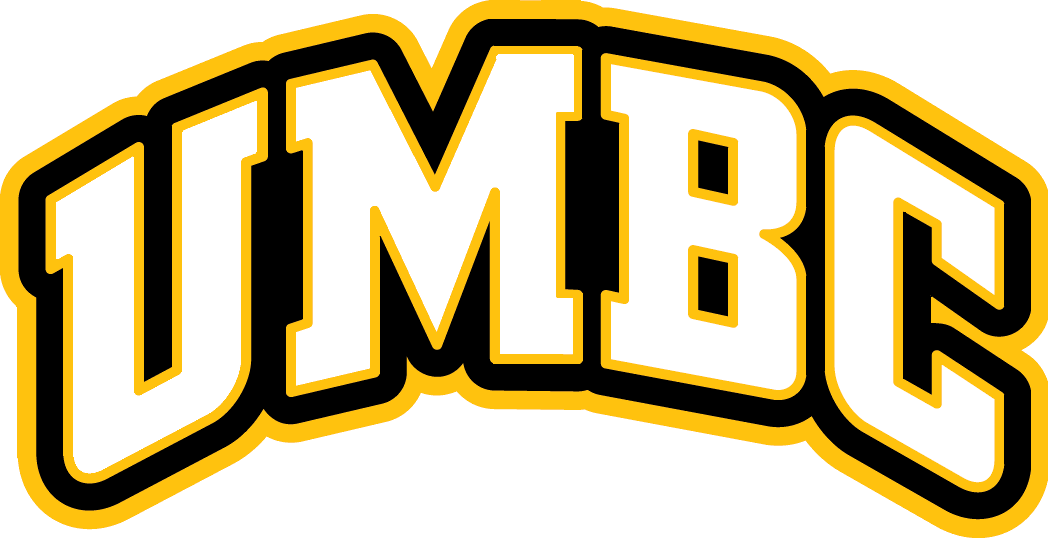

The UMBC Retrievers men's basketball statistical leaders are individual statistical leaders of the UMBC Retrievers men's basketball program in various categories, including points, assists, blocks, rebounds, and steals. Within those areas, the lists identify single-game, single-season, and career leaders. The Retrievers represent the University of Maryland, Baltimore County in the NCAA's America East Conference.

UMBC began competing in intercollegiate basketball in 1967. The NCAA did not officially record assists as a stat until the 1983–84 season, and blocks and steals until the 1985–86 season, but UMBC's record books includes players in these stats before these seasons. These lists are updated through the end of the 2023–24 season.

== Scoring ==
Career
Rk	Player	Points	Seasons
1	Larry Simmons	1,805	1986–87 1987–88 1988–89 1989–90
2	Jairus Lyles	1,751	2015–16 2016–17 2017–18
3	Rick Moreland	1,728	1979–80 1980–81 1981–82 1982–83
4	John Goedeke	1,698	1975–76 1976–77 1977–78 1978–79
5	Terence Ward	1,692	1997–98 1998–99 1999–00 2000–01
6	Joe Sherburne	1,563	2015–16 2016–17 2017–18 2018–19
7	Reggie Nance	1,558	1977–78 1978–79 1979–80 1980–81
8	Brian Hodges	1,472	2004–05 2005–06 2006–07 2007–08
9	Breck Robinson	1,323	1982–83 1983–84 1984–85 1985–86
10	Kennedy Okafor	1,319	1997–98 1998–99 1999–00 2000–01

Season
Rk	Player	Points	Season
1	Jairus Lyles	665	2017–18
2	Darryl Proctor	639	2008–09
3	Rick Moreland	610	1982–83
4	Dion Brown	607	2023-24
5	Jairus Lyles	604	2016–17
6	Larry Simmons	570	1989–90
7	Will Darley	552	2016–17
8	Ray Barbosa	546	2007–08
9	Marcus Banks Jr.	531	2024–25
10	Kenny Reynolds	514	1987–88

Single game
Rk	Player	Points	Season	Opponent
1	Derell Thompson	43	1991–92	Towson
2	Larry Simmons	39	1989–90	Drexel
3	Will Darley	38	2016–17	UMass Lowell
4	Jairus Lyles	37	2015–16	Maine
	Roy Walker	37	1968–69	Catonsville
6	Jay Greene	36	2008–09	UNH
	Brian Hodges	36	2006–07	Morgan
	Reggie Nance	36	1979–80	Hartwick
9	Marcus Banks Jr.	35	2024–25	NJIT
	Jairus Lyles	35	2017–18	Hartford
	Henry McCaskill	35	1974–75	G. Mason

== Rebounds ==
Career
Rk	Player	Rebounds	Seasons
1	Kennedy Okafor	985	1997–98 1998–99 1999–00 2000–01
2	Rick Moreland	931	1979–80 1980–81 1981–82 1982–83
3	John Goedeke	919	1975–76 1976–77 1977–78 1978–79
4	Breck Robinson	902	1982–83 1983–84 1984–85 1985–86
5	Emmerson Small	810	1970–71 1971–72 1972–73 1973–74
6	Reggie Nance	781	1977–78 1978–79 1979–80 1980–81
7	Henry McCaskill	673	1971–72 1972–73 1973–74 1974–75
8	Andrew Feeley	648	2001–02 2002–03 2003–04 2004–05
9	Chase Plummer	626	2010–11 2011–12 2012–13 2013–14
10	Joe Sherburne	611	2015–16 2016–17 2017–18 2018–19

Season
Rk	Player	Rebounds	Season
1	Breck Robinson	312	1985–86
2	Rick Moreland	297	1982–83
3	James Drew	289	1971–72
4	Darryl Proctor	280	2008–09
5	Henry McCaskill	279	1974–75
6	Darryl Proctor	278	2007–08
7	Kennedy Okafor	269	1999–00
8	Kennedy Okafor	268	2000–01
9	Emmerson Small	267	1973–74
10	Kenny Reynolds	266	1987–88

Single game
Rk	Player	Rebounds	Season	Opponent
1	Henry McCaskill	24	1974–75	Geo. Mason
	Henry McCaskill	24	1974–75	Wash (Md.)
	Henry McCaskill	24	1973–74	George Mason
	Bill Wade	24	1969–70	Harford CC
5	Rick Moreland	22	1982–83	Coppin St.
6	John Goedeke	21	1977–78	Navy
7	Jairus Lyles	20	2016–17	The Citadel
	Sonique Nixon	20	1991–92	Central Conn.
	Kennedy Okafor	20	2000–01	Bucknell
	Justin Fry	20	2010–11	Hartford

== Assists ==
Career
Rk	Player	Assists	Seasons
1	Jay Greene	683	2005–06 2006–07 2007–08 2008–09
2	Dana Harris	507	1989–90 1990–91 1991–92 1992–93
3	Jeff Brooks	421	1976–77 1977–78 1978–79 1979–80
4	Larry Simmons	413	1986–87 1987–88 1988–89 1989–90
5	Rob Gogerty	386	2001–02 2002–03 2003–04 2004–05
6	Jack Kane	373	1975–76 1976–77 1977–78 1978–79
7	Jourdan Grant	350	2014–15 2015–16 2016–17 2017–18
8	Chris De La Rosa	344	2009–10 2010–11 2011–12
9	Chris Farrell	319	1979–80 1980–81 1981–82 1982–83
10	Justin Wilson	317	1999–00 2000–01 2001–02 2002–03

Season
Rk	Player	Assists	Season
1	Jay Greene	236	2007–08
2	Jay Greene	187	2008–09
3	Chris De La Rosa	181	2010–11
4	Dana Harris	177	1991–92
5	Dana Harris	168	1992–93
6	K. J. Maura	166	2017–18
7	Jay Greene	159	2006–07
8	Henry McMullan	158	1983–84
9	Chris De La Rosa	153	2009–10

Single game
Rk	Player	Assists	Season	Opponent
1	Dana Harris	20	1992–93	St. Mary's
2	Jay Greene	14	2006–07	Maine
	Dana Harris	14	1991–92	Radford
	Dana Harris	14	1991–92	Central Conn. St.
5	Jay Greene	13	2005–06	Navy
	Chris De La Rosa	13	2010–11	Maine
	Darnell Rogers	13	2021–22	Stony Brook
8	Jay Greene	12	2007–08	Stony Brook
	Ray Davidson	12	1973–74	Gallaudet
	Rich Bellamy	12	1971–72	Southeastern

== Steals ==
Career
Rk	Player	Steals	Seasons
1	Larry Simmons	240	1986–87 1987–88 1988–89 1989–90
2	Dana Harris	180	1989–90 1990–91 1991–92 1992–93
3	Jairus Lyles	175	2015–16 2016–17 2017–18
4	Terence Ward	165	1997–98 1998–99 1999–00 2000–01
5	Jay Greene	157	2005–06 2006–07 2007–08 2008–09
	Chase Plummer	157	2010–11 2011–12 2012–13 2013–14
7	Rob Gogerty	151	2001–02 2002–03 2003–04 2004–05
8	Reggie Nance	147	1977–78 1978–79 1979–80 1980–81
9	Justin Wilson	144	1999–00 2000–01 2001–02 2002–03
10	Brian Watkins	137	1989–90 1990–91 1991–92 1992–93

Season
Rk	Player	Steals	Season
1	Larry Simmons	80	1989–90
2	K. J. Jackson	77	2018–19
3	Dana Harris	72	1992–93
4	Jairus Lyles	68	2017–18
5	K. J. Maura	65	2017–18
6	K. J. Maura	60	2016–17
	Darryl Proctor	60	2007–08
8	Larry Simmons	57	1988–89
9	Dana Harris	56	1991–92
10	Jairus Lyles	54	2016–17
	Chase Plummer	54	2012–13

Single game
Rk	Player	Steals	Season	Opponent
1	Craig O'Connel	9	1968–69	
	Steve Maszgay	9	1968–69	
3	K. J. Maura	7	2017–18	UNH
	Chauncey Gilliam	7	2009–10	Bingh’mt’n
	Darryl Proctor	7	2007–08	Georgetown
	Larry Simmons	7	1987–88	Wright State
	Gamel Spencer	7	1987–88	Central Fla.
	Levi Franklin	7	1989–90	Fla. Int’tional
	Larry Simmons	7	1989–90	St. Bona.
	Larry Simmons	7	1989–90	Rider
	Spencer Ferguson	7	1992–93	Liberty

== Blocks ==
Career
Rk	Player	Blocks	Seasons
1	Pascal Fleury	204	1993–94 1994–95
2	Breck Robinson	148	1982–83 1983–84 1984–85 1985–86
3	Kerry Martin	139	1996–97 1997–98 1998–99 1999–00
4	Reggie Nance	136	1977–78 1978–79 1979–80 1980–81
5	Rick Moreland	126	1979–80 1980–81 1981–82 1982–83
6	Sonique Nixon	107	1991–92 1992–93 1993–94
7	Kennedy Okafor	103	1997–98 1998–99 1999–00 2000–01

Season
Rk	Player	Blocks	Season
1	Pascal Fleury	124	1994–95
2	Pascal Fleury	80	1993–94
3	Cavell Johnson	70	2007–08
4	Max Lorca-Lloyd	67	2023-24
5	Kerry Martin	63	1999–00

Single game
Rk	Player	Blocks	Season	Opponent
1	Pascal Fleury	10	1993–94	Winthrop
2	Pascal Fleury	9	1994–95	North Texas
	Pascal Fleury	9	1994–95	Liberty
4	Pascal Fleury	8	1993–94	UNCA
	Pascal Fleury	8	1994–95	Co. Carolina
6	Sonique Nixon	7	1991–92	Hofstra
	Pascal Fleury	7	1994–95	UNCG
	Kerry Martin	7	1997–98	Lehigh
	Kerry Martin	7	1999–00	St. Francis (Pa.)
	Eugene Young	7	2001–02	Quinnipiac
	Max Lorca-Lloyd	7	2023–24	Binghamton
