= Patrick Gym =

Arena in Burlington, Vermont; Home of the Vermont Catamounts

Coordinates: 44.470264°N 73.194705°W

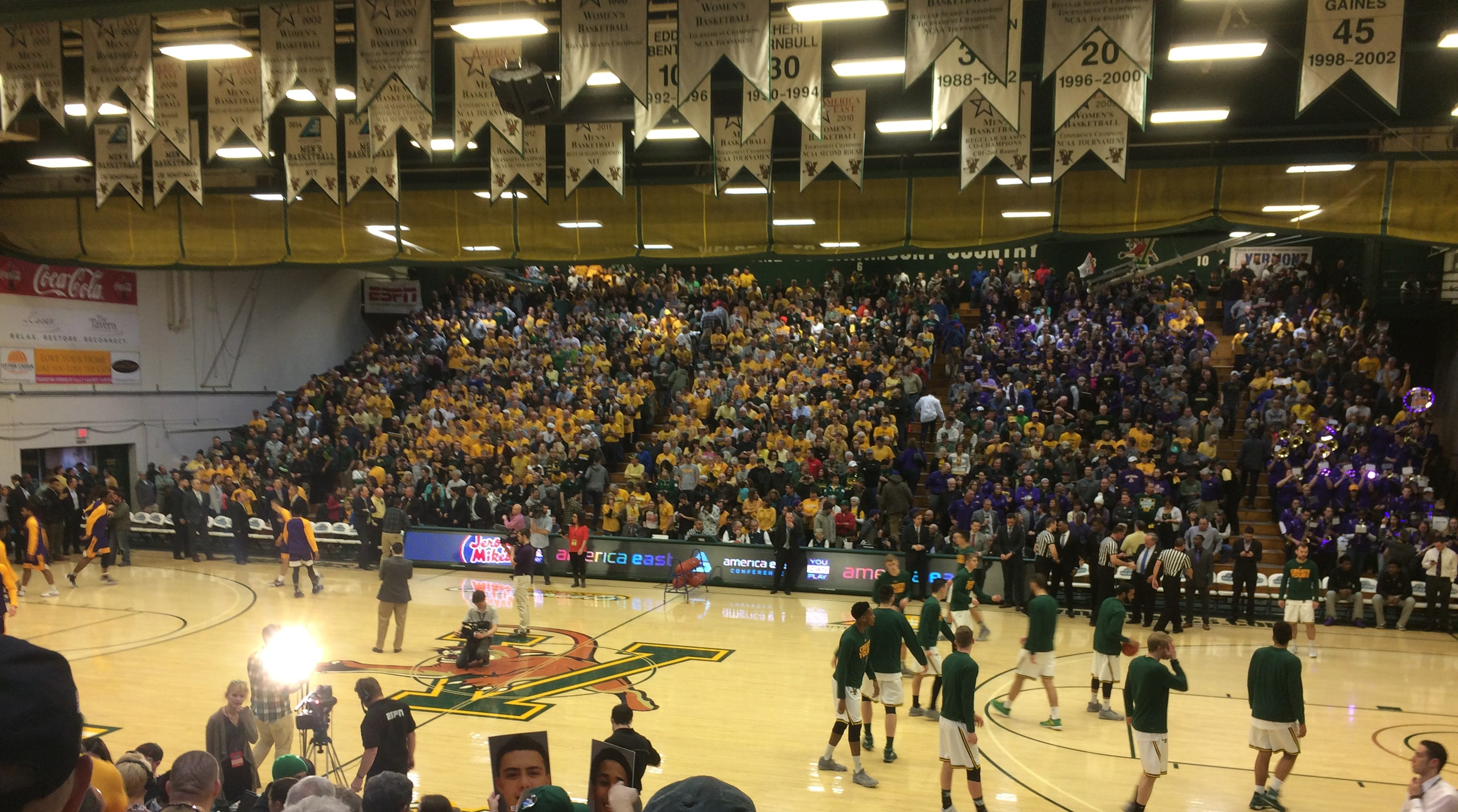
- 2017 America East Championship Game
- Interactive map of Patrick Gym
- Location: 97 Spear St, Burlington, Vermont
- Owner: University of Vermont
- Operator: University of Vermont
- Capacity: 3,228

Construction
- Built: 1961

Tenant
- Vermont Catamounts (NCAA)

The Roy L. Patrick Gymnasium is a 3,228-seat (3,266 for men's and women's basketball) multi-purpose arena in Burlington, Vermont. It was built in 1963 to replace the Old Gymnasium, a then-60-year-old facility now known as the Royall Tyler Theater. It is used mainly as the home arena of the Vermont Catamounts men's and women's basketball teams. It has been the site of the 2004, 2005, 2007, 2010, 2013, 2017, 2018, 2019, and 2022 America East men's basketball tournament championship games, as the higher seed in the final hosts the game. The championship games were all televised on ESPN or ESPN2. Vermont has consistently been among the America East leaders in home attendance and in 2004–05, it became the only America East men's basketball program to sell out every game for an entire season.

Patrick Gym is also a concert venue, seating up to 4,000. It can also accommodate conventions and trade shows; there are 22,251 square feet (2,067.2 m^{2}) of arena floor space, with an additional 31,218 square feet (2,900.2 m^{2}) at the indoor track and 36,189 square feet (3,362.1 m^{2}) at the indoor tennis courts, both of which are adjacent to Patrick Gymnasium. The current bleachers at Patrick Gym were installed in 1982, and new lighting and the current floor were installed in 1990.

Currently the university has plans to replace the over 50 year old Patrick Gym with a new event center next to Gutterson Fieldhouse. The new arena will have a capacity of 3,200 with a price tag of $80 million. It was announced in December 2018 that the new arena will be named the Tarrant Event Center, in honor of Rich and Deb Tarrant who donated $15 million to the project. The arena was originally intended to be ready for the 2020–21 school year, but construction delays and financial uncertainties due to the COVID-19 pandemic have indefinitely delayed construction as of 2025. Once the basketball programs move to the Tarrant Center, Patrick Gym will be converted into a campus recreation facility.

== Events ==
Patrick Gym is also used as the venue for the Vermont State Division I Boys and Girls Basketball Championship semifinals and final. The Boston Celtics held their training camp at Patrick Gym prior to the start of the 2004–05 NBA season. In the 1960s, the Celtics played several exhibition games at Patrick Gym.

=== America East Championship ===
The gym has played host to many America East championship games because of Vermont men's basketball success in the conference tournament. On March 10, 2018, Vermont hosted UMBC in the America East Championship game. Jairus Lyles hit the game winning three pointer to clinch the America East Championship and advance to the NCAA tournament, which would later turn out to be a historic run for UMBC.

The very next season, Vermont returned the favor by beating UMBC 66–49. It was the sixth time UVM had clinched the America East championship and a bid to the NCAA Tournament, and the fifth time they'd accomplished the feat at Patrick Gym.

== See also ==
- List of NCAA Division I basketball arenas
