= Kathy Delaney-Smith =

American basketball coach

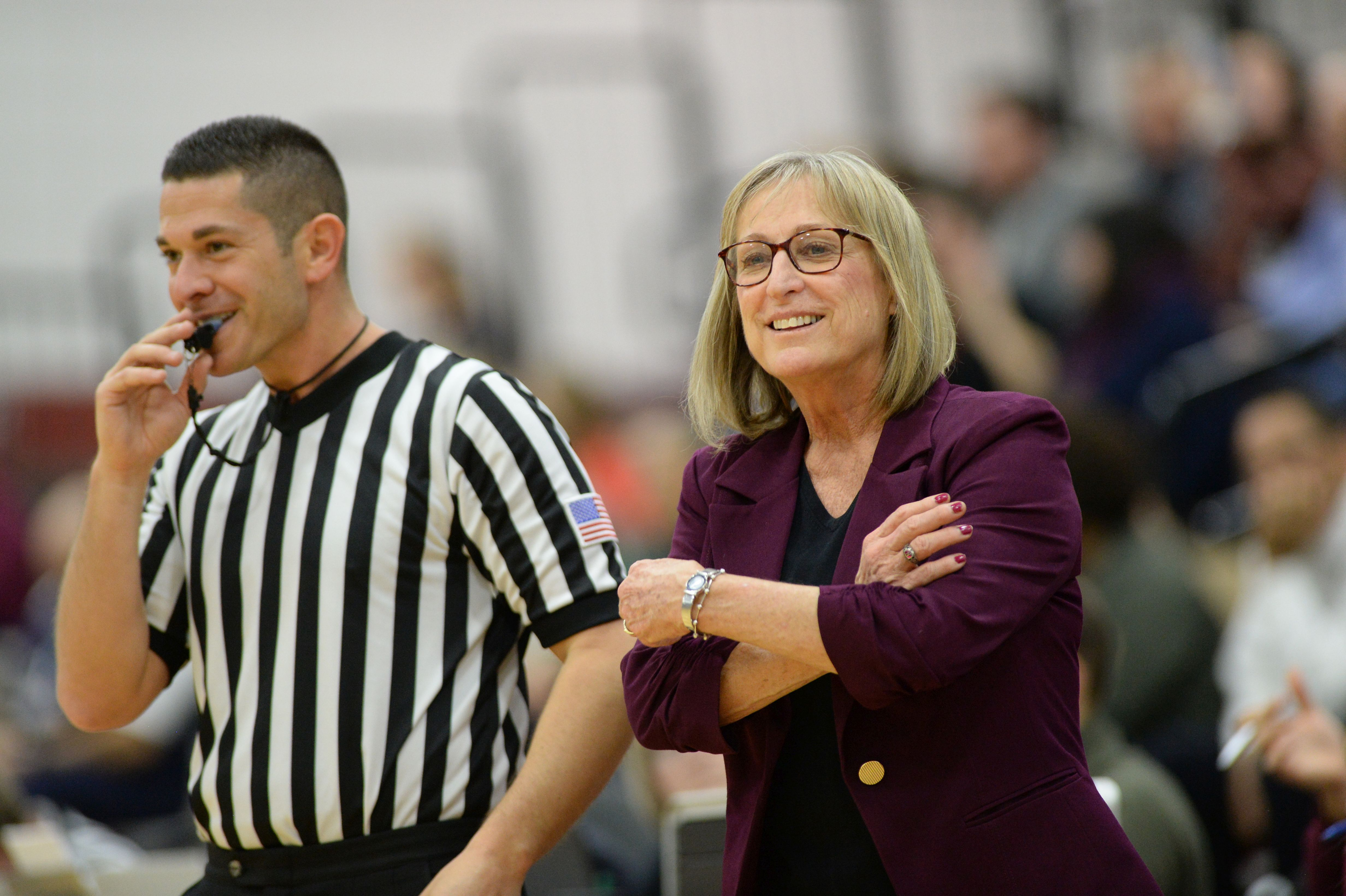
- Delaney-Smith in 2012

Biographical details
- Education: Bridgewater State

Coaching career (HC unless noted)
- 1970–1982: Westwood HS
- 1982–2022: Harvard

Head coaching record
- Overall: 630–434 (.592)

Kathy Delaney-Smith is an American former college basketball coach. She retired at the end of the 2021–22 season after 40 seasons as head coach of the women's basketball team at Harvard University. (Note: Due to COVID-19 concerns, Harvard's home conference of the Ivy League chose not to compete in basketball during the 2020–21 season.) At the time of her retirement, she was the longest-tenured women's head coach at a single school in NCAA Division I. (Note: Among then-current Division I women's head coaches, two technically had longer overall tenures, but not with the same school. A third had been a head coach in Division I before Delaney-Smith, but not continuously.: C. Vivian Stringer has held the title of head coach since 1972, before the NCAA began sponsoring women's sports in 1981–82. However, she did not arrive at her current school, Rutgers, until 1995, and has not actively coached since 2019–20 due to COVID-19 concerns.; Tara VanDerveer's tenure as a head coach also predates the NCAA era, having first coached in 1978. However, she did not become head coach at Stanford until 1985, and she took a leave for the 1995–96 season to serve as head coach of the US national team at the 1996 Olympics.; Doug Bruno first became head coach at DePaul in 1976, but left in 1978 for other coaching opportunities and did not return to DePaul until 1988.) With Harvard, Delaney-Smith had her 600th win as an NCAA Division I coach in March 2019.

In 1998, Harvard beat Stanford in the first round of the NCAA tournament, the first time in men's or women's Division I NCAA history that a sixteenth seeded team had beaten a number 1 seed.

== Early years ==
Delaney–Smith grew up in the Boston suburb of Newton, Massachusetts and is one of six children. She attended Sacred Heart High School and became the first female in Massachusetts basketball history to score 1000 points. Delaney-Smith joked that this was because the coach was her mother who made her teammates pass to her.

She attended college at Bridgewater State, which, at the time, did not have a varsity basketball team for women. Rather than compete on the recreational club basketball team, Delaney-Smith chose to compete on the synchronized swimming team—the only competitive option for female swimmers at the time.

== High school coaching ==
After graduating from Bridgewater, her goal was to become a swim coach. She knew that Westwood High School, a few miles south of Newton, had constructed a new swimming pool, so she applied for a position as teacher and swim coach. She interviewed with the school superintendent, whose daughter played on the basketball team. He mentioned the basketball team was "terrible" and asked, "Can you coach them and can you win?" She responded that she could.

Although she played in high school, she faced a new challenge: she grew up playing the six-on-six version of basketball, a very different style of basketball than five-person basketball which she now had to learn how to coach. The team went 0–11 in the first season, but over the next 11 years, the teams she coached had six undefeated seasons, including a 100-game winning streak, a 204–31 record, and won a state championship. During the winning streak, her players started calling her the "Wizard of Westwood", borrowing the nickname of UCLA coaching legend John Wooden.

Delaney-Smith has always been a strong advocate of gender equity. While at Westwood, she filed multiple Title IX lawsuits to help ensure that the players had sufficient resources, and also pushed the school to schedule girls' games at night to allow parents and recruiters to watch. In the mid-70s, she encountered other obstacles when she and her team played a road game. The team had changed from street clothes into uniforms in the locker room at their own school and then traveled to the game. They returned to their own gym, "tired, sweaty and eager to retrieve their belongings", but their own gym was occupied by a visiting boys' team. They were told they had to wait. Delaney-Smith disagreed, and led her team past the teacher guarding the door. She remarked, "I think it was a little frenetic, to be honest." But, she made her point.

In her time at Westwood, Delaney-Smith coached seven Boston Globe All-Scholastic selections, and saw many of her players continue their careers in college. Among the players she coached was future sportswriter Jackie MacMullan. Delaney-Smith was inducted into the Westwood Hall of Fame in 1996.

== Harvard ==
Due to her success as a high school basketball coach, she received numerous inquiries regarding a college position, but the first one she took seriously was a call from Harvard due to the commitment to gender equity demonstrated by the hiring committee. Even after being hired by Harvard, she continued to have to fight for her teams. On one occasion, when traveling to a road game, the team showed up for the pregame shoot-around, but found that the men's team was using the gym.

The transition to the college game mirrored, in some ways, her start as a high school coach. While they won a few games in the first three seasons, Harvard finished last in the conference in each of those years. That would change in the 1985–86 season, when the team had their first 20-game winning season, went 9–3 in the conference, and finished in a tie for first place, her first of many conference titles. That first conference championship is one of her fondest accomplishments, which she savors because she believed her team "outworked most opponents".

Today, winning the conference tournament means an automatic bid to the postseason NCAA tournament. However, until 2017, the Ivy League did not operate a conference tournament, instead awarding its automatic bid to the regular-season champion. More importantly, not all conferences had an automatic bid to the tournament in 1986. The Ivy League would be granted an automatic bid starting in 1994. While an Ivy League team could be invited to the NCAA tournament as an at-large team, it has only happened once, by Dartmouth in 1983. Harvard finished first in the Ivy League in 1986, 1988, and 1991, but did not get their first invitation to the NCAA tournament until 1996.

Harvard first played in an NCAA tournament in 1996. Although the Crimson lost to Vanderbilt, they hit 16 three-point attempts in the game, setting a record for an NCAA tournament game that has been subsequently tied but not exceeded as of 2017. In 1997, they again won the Ivy League, going 14–0 for their first-ever undefeated conference season and an invitation to the NCAA tournament, where they faced top-seeded North Carolina and lost.

In 1998, Harvard again won the conference, and had its best season ever winning 23 games, helped by the leading scorer in the nation Allison Feaster, who averaged 28.5 points per game. They were invited, as expected, to the NCAA tournament, but despite their overall performance they would receive a 16 seed. They traveled west to play number-one seed Stanford Cardinal on their court. However, Stanford would be playing without two of their best players—Vanessa Nygaard, who tore an ACL in the Cardinal's final Pac-10 Conference game, and Kristin Folkl, who suffered the same injury shortly after in a practice. Despite the losses, the Cardinal were favorites to win the game, as a 16 seed had never beaten a top seed. As the team walked onto the court, one of the event workers said "Welcome to real basketball". Feaster delivered, scoring 35 points, but it was a teammate, Susie Miller, who hit a three-pointer late in the game to secure the win, representing the first, and still the only time a 16 seed has beaten a one seed in an NCAA women's tournament game. The feat has since been matched by the men, as the UMBC Retrievers upset Virginia in 2018, and Fairleigh Dickinson upset Purdue in 2023.

In 2014, she reached another milestone when Harvard beat Yale 69–65. That represented career win 515, pushing her past Princeton men's coach Pete Carril for the most wins by an Ivy League basketball coach. In March 2019, Delaney-Smith won her 600th game as an NCAA Division I coach. In her last season, Delaney-Smith was one of only three active head coaches, and the only women's head coach, to spend at least 40 years at the same Division I institution. (Note: The others were Jim Boeheim at Syracuse and Mike Krzyzewski at Duke.)

== Accomplishments and recognitions ==
- Boston Herald-American Coach of the Year in 1978–79 (high school)
- Boston Globe Coach of the Year in 1979–80 (high school)
- National High School Coaches Association 1981
- Has coached Harvard to all 11 of their Ivy League Titles, the first coming in the 1985–86 season
- Become the first woman named to the Massachusetts Basketball Coaches Hall of Fame in 1986
- 1996–97 Ivy League Coach of the Year after leading her squad to a 14-0 conference record paired with a second straight NCAA tournament berth
- The 1997 “Leading Woman” of the Patriots’ Trail Girl Scout Council, which recognizes women who have succeeded in their professional and public lives. She currently serves on the Board of Directors of the organization.
- During the 1997–98 season she coached the Crimson to a 25–3 overall record, and the first NCAA Tournament win for an Ivy League school. This win came over the Stanford Cardinals, which was also the first time in men's or women's basketball a #16 seed beat a #1 seed in the NCAA DI Tournament.
- Also, coached the 1997–98 team to the program's third Ivy League in a row, the first Ivy League team to accomplish this
- Served as the chairperson for the Converse Coach of the Year Selection Committee and was honored by Converse as the 1998 Coach of the Year in District I.
- Earned her 250th victory when leading the Crimson over Sacred Heart at the Harvard Invitational. Later, a win over Dartmouth cemented her as the first woman's Ivy League coached to have 150 Ancient Eight wins
- Inducted into the New Agenda Northeast Hall of Fame in 1998
- Inducted into the Bridgewater State Athletic Hall of Fame in October 1999
- New England Women's Leadership Award for Sports in March 2000
- Presented the prestigious Carol Eckman Award at the 2000 Women's Basketball Coaches Association (WBCA) convention.
- Inducted into the New England Basketball Hall of Fame in October 2003
- She has been recognized by the Women's Educational and Industrial Union as a “woman who has inspired other women and has contributed to the quality of life for women and their families.” In 2007, she received the Gildna Radnar Award, which recognizes individuals who have demonstrated determination and hope in the face of cancer.
- During the 2023–24 season, she was announced as the namesake of a new annual national award presented by the women's basketball analytics website Her Hoop Stats to the top Division I mid-major head coach, defined as those working outside the power conferences of college football plus the Big East Conference. The Kathy Delaney-Smith Mid-Major Coach of the Year Award was first presented in 2024 to Lisa Fortier of Gonzaga.

== Head coaching record ==
=== College ===
Record table
Season	Team	Overall	Conference	Standing	Postseason
Harvard Crimson (Ivy League) (1982–2022)
1982–83	Harvard	7–17	3–9	7th	
1983–84	Harvard	3–22	2–10	7th	
1984–85	Harvard	8–18	2–10	7th	
1985–86	Harvard	20–7	9–3	T-1st	
1986–87	Harvard	13–13	8–6	4th	
1987–88	Harvard	21–5	12–2	T-1st	
1988–89	Harvard	15–11	9–5	4th	
1989–90	Harvard	14–12	9–5	T-2nd	
1990–91	Harvard	17–9	12–2	1st	
1991–92	Harvard	14–12	11–3	2nd	
1992–93	Harvard	16–9	11–3	2nd	
1993–94	Harvard	7–19	4–10	7th	
1994–95	Harvard	19–7	11–3	2nd	
1995–96	Harvard	20–7	13–1	1st	NCAA First round
1996–97	Harvard	20–7	14–0	1st	NCAA First round
1997–98	Harvard	23–5	12–2	1st	NCAA Second round
1998–99	Harvard	10–15	7–7	T-4th	
1999-00	Harvard	16–10	9–5	T-2nd	
2000–01	Harvard	12–15	9–5	2nd	
2001–02	Harvard	22–6	13–1	1st	NCAA First round
2002–03	Harvard	22–5	14–0	1st	NCAA First round
2003–04	Harvard	16–11	9–5	T-2nd	
2004–05	Harvard	20–8	12–2	T-1st	
2005–06	Harvard	12–15	8–6	4th	
2006–07	Harvard	15–13	13–1	1st	NCAA First round
2007–08	Harvard	18–11	11–3	T-1st	
2008–09	Harvard	19–10	11–3	2nd	WNIT First round
2009–10	Harvard	20–9	11–3	2nd	WNIT First round
2010–11	Harvard	18–10	10–4	T-2nd	
2011–12	Harvard	18–12	10–4	2nd	WNIT Second round
2012–13	Harvard	21–9	11–3	2nd	WNIT Second round
2013–14	Harvard	22–8	11–3	2nd	WNIT Second round
2014–15	Harvard	14–14	7–7	T-3rd	
2015–16	Harvard	14–14	9–5	3rd	WNIT First round
2016–17	Harvard	21–9	8–6	3rd	WNIT Second round
2017–18	Harvard	18–11	10–4	3rd	WNIT First round
2018–19	Harvard	17–13	9–5	3rd	WNIT Second round
2019–20	Harvard	15–12	6–8	5th	
2021–22	Harvard	13–14	7–7	T–4th	
Harvard:		630–434 (.592)	367–171 (.682)		
Total:		630–434 (.592)			
National champion Postseason invitational champion Conference regular season champion Conference regular season and conference tournament champion Division regular season champion Division regular season and conference tournament champion Conference tournament champion

Sources:

- IVY League Standings
- Harvard Schedule

== See also ==
- List of college women's basketball career coaching wins leaders
