= K. J. Maura =

Puerto Rican basketball player (born 1995)

KJ Maura
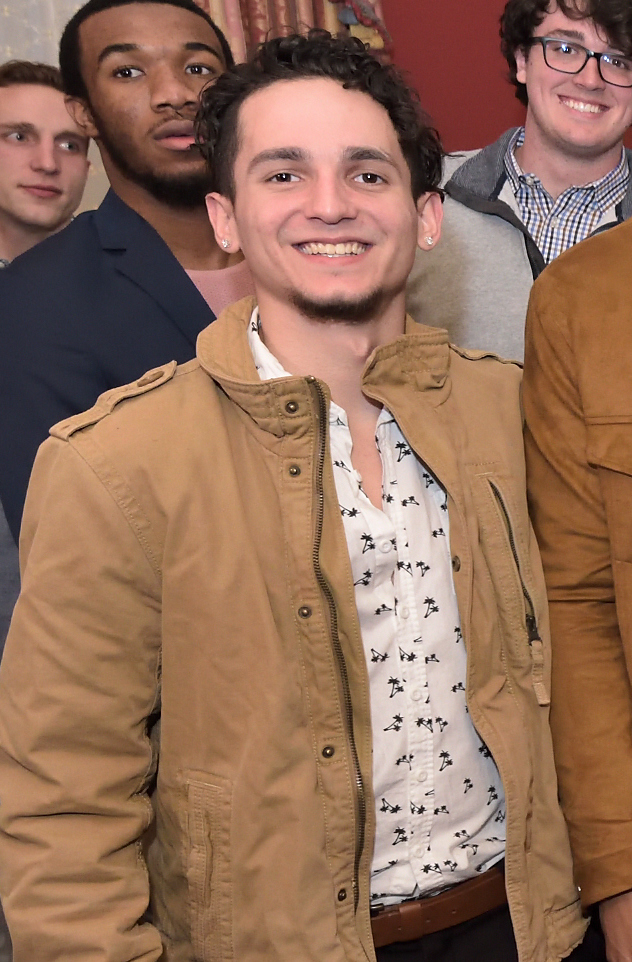
- Maura in 2018

No. 11 – Mets de Guaynabo
- Position: Point guard
- League: BSN

Personal information
- Born: July 30, 1995 (age 31) San Juan, Puerto Rico
- Listed height: 5 ft 8 in (1.73 m)
- Listed weight: 150 lb (68 kg)

Career information
- High school: Arlington Country Day (Jacksonville, Florida)
- College: Abilene Christian (2014–2015); College of Central Florida (2015–2016); UMBC (2016–2018)
- NBA draft: 2018: undrafted
- Playing career: 2018–present

Career history
- 2018–2019: Santeros de Aguada
- 2019: Indios de San Francisco de Macorís
- 2019–2020: Terceira Basket
- 2020–2022: Cariduros de Fajardo
- 2023–2025: Gigantes de Carolina
- 2025–present: Mets de Guaynabo

Career highlights
- 2× BSN champion (2019, 2023); Third-team All-America East (2018); America East Defensive Player of the Year (2018); 2× America East All-Defensive Team (2017, 2018)

Kevin Joel Maura Colón (born July 30, 1995) is a Puerto Rican professional basketball player for Mets de Guaynabo of the Baloncesto Superior Nacional (BSN). He played college basketball for the UMBC Retrievers, spending his final two years of eligibility with the Retrievers, earning America East Defensive Player of the Year and All-Conference honors as a senior. Listed as a 5-foot-8, 140-pound point guard, he was measured as the lightest player in NCAA Division I basketball while at UMBC.

A native of San Juan, he competed at the high school level with Arlington Country Day School in Jacksonville, Florida. He began his college career representing the Abilene Christian Wildcats but transferred to College of Central Florida after his freshman season.

== Early life ==
Maura was born in San Juan, Puerto Rico to Erica Colón and Melvin Maura. He began playing organized basketball at around age five, being encouraged by his father Melvin, who was a fan of the Los Angeles Lakers of the National Basketball Association (NBA). Maura grew up watching highlights of Steve Nash, who he has called his "hero" and the "best player ever." He began playing high school basketball in Puerto Rico and took part in youth national team camps, but because he only stood 5 ft 5 in (1.65 m) by the summer of 2012, he was given limited attention.

After Maura's small size started hampering his early basketball career, his father contacted Art Alvarez, former high school coach of J. J. Barea, who allowed Maura to train at his camp for one week at Miami Christian School in Miami. Alvarez subsequently invited Maura to join his travel team, the Miami Tropics, for a tournament in Las Vegas that would be attended by over 100 college basketball coaches. He led the team to the championship game of the event.

== High school career ==
In the fall of 2012, Maura began a two-year stint for the prestigious basketball program at Arlington Country Day School in Jacksonville, Florida, where he played under head coach Rex Morgan, a friend of Art Alvarez, and faced top-ranked recruits like Joel Embiid, Jabari Parker, and Andrew Wiggins. In his junior season, he averaged 10 points, 12 assists, and 3 steals per game, leading Arlington Country Day to a 30–4 record and top-15 national ranking. He earned most valuable player (MVP) honors at the City of Palms Tournament, which featured several top high school players. As a senior, Maura helped his team reach the state championship. Despite his success at Arlington Country Day, Maura was an unheralded recruit and received few offers from NCAA Division I programs.

== College career ==
Maura played one season at Abilene Christian and enjoyed solid playing time off the bench, but was dismissed due to a violation of team rules midway through his freshman year. He joined the College of Central Florida and had a strong season, earning junior-college All-America honors and leading the JUCO ranks with 9.6 assists per game. After the season he attended an all-star game in Las Vegas, where he was noticed by UMBC coach Ryan Odom who recruited him to the school. Maura averaged 8.9 points and 4.3 assists per game in his junior season. As a senior at UMBC, Maura was named to the Third-Team All-Conference and won the America East Defensive Player of the Year award, finishing the year averaging 11.3 points and 5.0 assists per game. He helped #16 seed UMBC defeat #1 seed Virginia in the first round of the NCAA Tournament in a historic upset.

== Professional career ==
On May 5, 2018, Maura signed with Santeros de Aguada of the Baloncesto Superior Nacional (BSN) in Puerto Rico. During his second season with Aguada, Maura helped the team reach the BSN finals. With the series being tied 2-2, the Santeros being down by 18 points with just under 7 minutes left in game 5, and Maura not being used much during the playoffs, he was given an opportunity in the fourth quarter, posting 14 points, 3 assists, and playing crucial defense to help the Santeros win and take a 3–2 lead. In game 6 of the finals, with the Santeros down again late in the third quarter, Maura was given another opportunity, playing the entirety of the fourth quarter, helping Aguada comeback and win the game, as well as the franchise's first championship. This win represented Maura's first professional championship.

In August 2019, Maura was selected in the second round of the Liga Nacional de Baloncesto rookie draft by the Indios de San Francisco de Macorís. He averaged 4.5 points and 1.9 assists per game in 14 games. On December 6, 2019, Maura signed with Terceira Basket in Portugal. In 2020, he joined Cariduros de Fajardo.

== Career statistics ==
Legend
GP	Games played	GS	Games started	MPG	Minutes per game
FG%	Field goal percentage	3P%	3-point field goal percentage	FT%	Free throw percentage
RPG	Rebounds per game	APG	Assists per game	SPG	Steals per game
BPG	Blocks per game	PPG	Points per game	**Bold**	Career high

=== College ===
Year	Team	GP	GS	MPG	FG%	3P%	FT%	RPG	APG	SPG	BPG	PPG
2014–15	Abilene Christian	17	0	11.5	.344	.333	**1.000**	1.4	1.8	.5	.0	1.9
2016–17	UMBC	**33**	**32**	32.5	.431	.400	.892	**2.8**	4.3	1.8	.0	8.9
2017–18	UMBC	**33**	30	**35.1**	**.469**	**.432**	.863	2.2	**5.0**	**2.0**	.0	**11.3**
Career		83	62	29.2	.445	.414	.882	2.3	4.1	1.6	.0	8.4

== See also ==
- 2018 UMBC vs. Virginia men's basketball game
