= 1998 Harvard vs. Stanford women's basketball game =

First 16–1 upset in college basketball postseason

1998 NCAA tournament west regional first round
Harvard Crimson	Stanford Cardinal
Ivy	Pac-10
(22–4)	(21–5)
71	67
Head coach: Kathy Delaney-Smith	Head coach: Tara VanDerveer
- AP: NR
- AP: 5
	1st half	2nd half	Total
Harvard Crimson	43	28	71
Stanford Cardinal	34	33	67
- Date: March 14, 1998
- Venue: Maples Pavilion, Stanford, California
- Attendance: 5,137

United States TV coverage
- Network: ESPN
- Announcers: Ann Meyers, Dave Barnett

On March 14, 1998, during the first round of the 1998 NCAA Division I women's basketball tournament, the Stanford Cardinal of Stanford University played a college basketball game against the Harvard Crimson of Harvard University in Stanford, California. The Cardinal, seeded 1st in the West bracket and 1st overall in the NCAA tournament, faced Harvard, seeded 16th in the West bracket and ranked 62nd overall (out of a field of 64).

The Crimson defeated the Cardinal 71–67, becoming the first No. 16 seed to defeat a No. 1 seed in the NCAA Division I women's basketball tournament, and the first No. 16 seed to defeat a No. 1 seed in college basketball. Harvard also earned its first NCAA tournament win in school history. Stanford finished their season at 21–6 while Harvard improved to 23–4.

== Background ==
=== Stanford ===
Tara VanDerveer was hired in 1985 to coach the Cardinal. In her third season, they reached the NCAA tournament for the first time since 1982 and made it to the Sweet Sixteen. The Cardinal would continue to have postseason success in her tenure; they went on to reach every NCAA tournament until her retirement in 2024. They reached the Final Four in 1990 and won the tournament that year for their first championship. They reached the Final Four five further times in the next seven years, winning another tournament in 1992. In 1998, they won their tenth straight PAC-10 title in program history, and the senior class of players had a combined record of 113-13 leading up to the NCAA tournament. However, the team was plagued by injury late in the year. Star player Vanessa Nygaard went down with an Anterior cruciate ligament injury (ACL) against Oregon State while Kristin Folkl landed awkwardly during practice with her own torn ligament. Neither would play in the game.

=== Harvard ===
Harvard was ranked as a 16 seed for the third straight year despite a record of 22–4 on their way to the program's sixth Ivy League title (1986, 1988, 1991, 1996, 1997) and the nation's leading scorer in Allison Feaster. The team later stated that their anger at being ranked 16 fueled their fire for their game plan. This was Harvard's third overall NCAA tournament appearance (all under Kathy Delaney-Smith, hired in 1982), which had seen them lose in the first round each time. No Ivy League women's basketball team would win an NCAA tournament game again until Princeton in 2015.

== Venue and broadcast ==
The game was played at the Maples Pavilion in Stanford, California. The attendance for the game was 5,137. Stanford had played at least one tournament game at their own arena on a continual basis since the 1988 NCAA Division I women's basketball tournament. The Cardinal had won 59 straight games at Maples Pavilion. The game was televised nationally on ESPN and announced by Ann Meyers and Dave Barnett.

== Summary ==
Stanford took the lead first on a three-pointer. However, Harvard would quickly take control, building a lead of 22–9 with 9:22 remaining in the first half. Stanford battled back with a 25–11 run to lead 34–33 with 2:42 to go. Harvard scored nine unanswered points to lead 42–34 at halftime, where they had kept Stanford to 31% shooting while forcing nine turnovers and outrebounding Stanford by ten.

Melody Peterson narrowed the lead to one for Stanford with a three-pointer with 12:10 remaining in the game before taking the lead again with free throws by Heather Owen with 9:26 to go. The lead would change back and forth until the final minutes. With 1:33, Suzie Miller sank a jumper to make it 66-65 Harvard. A subsequent stop by Harvard led to Miller getting another shot opportunity, and she sank a three-pointer to make it 69–65. By the time of the last 28 seconds, Harvard led by five points and the game was essentially over. Leading the game was Allison Feaster, who had 35 points and 13 rebounds.

The Crimson won the game 71–67, making it the first time in the history of college basketball, both men and women, that a 16-seed defeated a 1-seed.

In the Crimson's next game, they would lose to the Arkansas Razorbacks 82–64, ending their cinderella run. It was the first and, until 2015, only victory by an Ivy League team in the women's NCAA tournament. To date, no other 16-seed in women's college basketball has achieved such a feat. The feat was not accomplished by a men's college basketball program until 2018, when UMBC beat Virginia, 74–54.

== See also ==
- 2018 UMBC vs. Virginia men's basketball game, the first time a 16-seed beat a 1-seed in men's college basketball
- 2023 Fairleigh Dickinson vs. Purdue men's basketball game, the second time a 16-seed beat a 1-seed in men's college basketball
