= Demetre Roberts =

American basketball player (born 2000)

KK Joker
- Position: Point guard
- League: BLS

Personal information
- Born: January 22, 2000 (age 26)
- Listed height: 5 ft 8 in (1.73 m)
- Listed weight: 165 lb (75 kg)

Career information
- High school: Mount Vernon (Mount Vernon, New York)
- College: St. Thomas Aquinas (2018–2022); Fairleigh Dickinson (2022–2023)
- NBA draft: 2023: undrafted
- Playing career: 2023–present

Career history
- 2023: Austin Spurs
- 2023–2024: FMP Soccerbet
- 2024–present: KK Joker

Career highlights
- First-team All-NEC (2023); 3× First-team All-ECC (2020–2022); Second-team All-ECC (2019); ECC Rookie of the Year (2019); ECC tournament MOP (2022)

Demetre Roberts is an American professional basketball player for KK Joker of the Basketball League of Serbia (BLS). He played college basketball for the Fairleigh Dickinson Knights and the St. Thomas Aquinas Spartans. He is known mostly for leading 16 seed FDU to a win over 1 seed Purdue in the first round of the 2023 NCAA Tournament, a feat only accomplished twice in tournament history.

== Early life and high school career ==
Roberts grew up in The Bronx and moved to Mount Vernon, New York at age 11. His mother was a detective in New York City, and he mostly spent time with his grandmother during his childhood. Roberts played basketball for Mount Vernon High School, where he became the starting point guard as a junior. He helped his team win the Class AA state title in his senior season, earning tournament most valuable player honors. He was lightly recruited by NCAA Division I programs and received his only scholarship offer from NCAA Division II program St. Thomas Aquinas.

== College career ==
Roberts played for St. Thomas Aquinas under head coach Tobin Anderson. As a freshman, he was named East Coast Conference (ECC) Rookie of the Year and second-team All-ECC. Roberts earned first-team All-ECC honors in his next three years and won three ECC tournament titles, being named tournament most outstanding player in his senior season. He transferred to Fairleigh Dickinson in the NCAA Division I, following coach Anderson, for his fifth season. Roberts was named first-team All-Northeast Conference. In the first round of the 2023 NCAA tournament, he recorded 12 points, four rebounds and four assists, helping 16-seed Fairleigh Dickinson upset first-seed Purdue, 63–58.

== Professional career ==
=== Austin Spurs (2023) ===
After going undrafted on the 2023 NBA draft, Roberts joined the Austin Spurs on October 31, 2023, after a tryout. However, he was waived on November 20.

=== FMP Soccerbet (2023–present) ===
On December 14, 2023, Roberts signed with FMP Soccerbet of the Basketball League of Serbia and the ABA League.
