= Joe Sherburne =

American basketball player (born 1996)

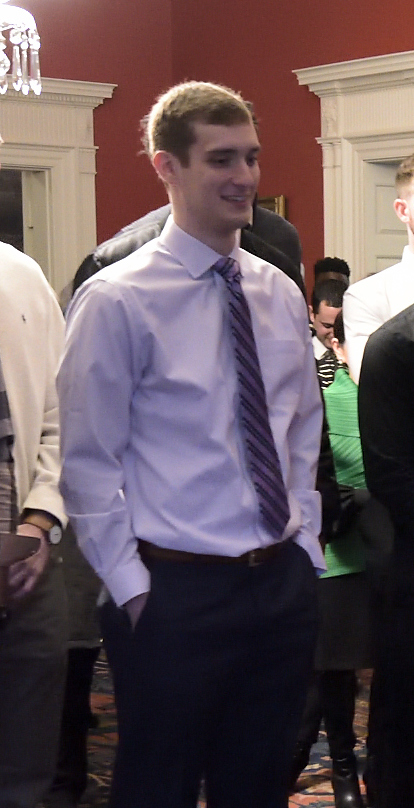

Personal information
- Born: January 15, 1996 (age 30)
- Listed height: 6 ft 6 in (1.98 m)
- Listed weight: 220 lb (100 kg)

Career information
- High school: Whitefish Bay (Whitefish Bay, Wisconsin); Brewster Academy (Wolfeboro, New Hampshire)
- College: UMBC (2015–2019)
- NBA draft: 2019: undrafted
- Playing career: 2019–present
- Position: Shooting guard

Career history
- 2019–2020: Ehingen Urspring

Career highlights
- Academic All-American of the Year (2019); First-team All-America East (2019)

Joe Sherburne (born January 15, 1996) is an American former professional basketball player who played for Ehingen Urspring of the ProA. He played college basketball for UMBC.

== Early life ==
Sherburne attended Whitefish Bay High School in Wisconsin. As a freshman, he won a state title but rarely played on the team. Sherburne was named honorable-mention All State in Division 2 during his senior season, but only received offers from several Division II programs. He transferred to Brewster Academy for his postgraduate season, where he was primarily a bench player. Sherburne performed well at a showcase and received a scholarship offer from UMBC, and he committed several weeks later.

== College career ==
Sherburne averaged 10.5 points and 4.5 rebounds per game as a freshman and was named to the America East All-Rookie Team. On December 7, 2016, Sherburne scored a career-high 28 points in a 78–70 win over Mount St. Mary's. As a sophomore, Sherburne averaged 10.9 points and 4.0 rebounds per game on a team that finished 21–13. He averaged 10.7 points and 3.9 rebounds per game as a junior, helping the team reach the NCAA Tournament. Sherburne scored 14 points in the Retrievers' upset of Virginia in the first round of the 2018 NCAA Tournament, becoming the first 16 seed to defeat a 1 seed.

As a senior, Sherburne averaged 13.9 points and 5.6 rebounds per game for another 20-win team. He was named to the First Team All-America East. Sherburne was named the 2019 Academic All-American of the Year after graduating from UMBC in three years with a 4.0 GPA and pursued his master's degree in data science. He was a repeat selection to the First Team Academic All-American, and became the first America East player to be named Academic All-American of the Year. Sherburne finished his UMBC career with the school record for starts, was the sixth all-time scoring leader and is the 1st player in school history with 1500 points, 600 rebounds and 200 assists.

== Professional career ==
In July 2019, Sherburne signed with Ehingen Urspring of the German ProA. He suffered an injury early in the season.

== Personal life ==
Sherburne is the son of Jan and Paul Sherburne, who attended Marquette University Law School, and he has two brothers. Sherburne's brother Jimmy played college basketball at Princeton and helped the team reach the 2011 NCAA Tournament. He is a Green Bay Packers fan and attracted the attention of Packers quarterback Aaron Rodgers after the Virginia upset.
