= 2023 Fairleigh Dickinson vs. Purdue men's basketball game =

Upset during NCAA March Madness in 2023

2023 NCAA tournament East Regional First Round
NCAA tournament game
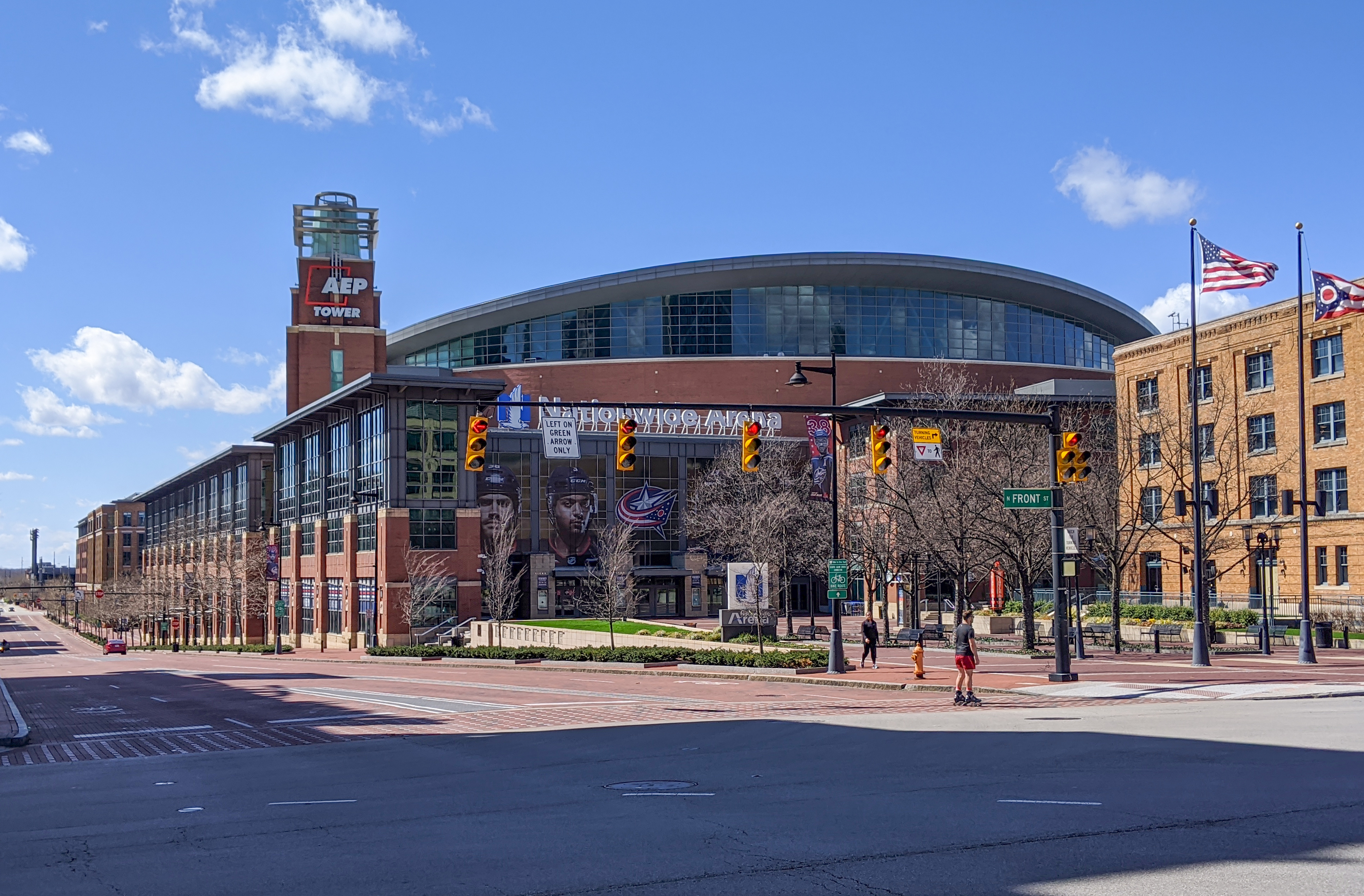
- Nationwide Arena, site of the game
Fairleigh Dickinson Knights	Purdue Boilermakers
NEC	Big Ten
(20–15)	(29–5)
63	58
Head coach: Tobin Anderson	Head coach: Matt Painter
- AP: NR
- Coaches: NR
- AP: 3
- Coaches: 3
	1st half	2nd half	Total
Fairleigh Dickinson Knights	32	31	63
Purdue Boilermakers	31	27	58
- Date: March 17, 2023
- Venue: Nationwide Arena, Columbus, Ohio
- Favorite: Purdue by 23 1/2
- Referees: Chris Beaver, Brian Dorsey, and Clarence Armstrong
- Attendance: 19,564

United States TV coverage
- Network: TNT
- Announcers: Andrew Catalon, Steve Lappas, and Jamie Erdahl
- Nielsen Ratings: 2.2 (national); U.S. viewership: 4.37 million

On March 17, 2023, during the first round of the 2023 NCAA Division I men's basketball tournament, the Purdue University Boilermakers played a college basketball game against the Fairleigh Dickinson University (Fairleigh Dickinson, also FDU) Knights at the Nationwide Arena in Columbus, Ohio. The Boilermakers, who were seeded first in the East regional bracket and fourth overall in the NCAA tournament, faced the Knights, who were seeded 16th in the East regional bracket and 68th, or last, overall.

The Knights defeated the Boilermakers 63–58, becoming the first No. 16 seed out of the First Four to defeat a No. 1 seed in the NCAA Division I men's basketball tournament, and the second 16-seed overall after UMBC's win over Virginia in 2018. It is also just the third time a 16-seed has beaten a 1-seed in college basketball overall, after No. 16 seeded Harvard defeated overall No. 1 Stanford in the women's tournament twenty-five years earlier. As a result, the Knights made it to the round of 32 for the first time in school history and became the first Northeast Conference team to win in the round of 64. With Purdue set as a 23 1/2-point favorite heading into the game, Fairleigh Dickinson's victory was the biggest upset in NCAA tournament history in terms of point spread. Purdue ended their season at 29–6, while Fairleigh Dickinson improved to 21–15.

== Background ==
At the start of this game, NCAA tournament No. 16 seeds were 1–150 all-time against No. 1 seeds since the tournament field expanded to 64 teams in 1985. Five years prior to this game, the UMBC Retrievers became the first No. 16 seed to defeat a No. 1 seed, 74–54, over the Virginia Cavaliers.

=== Fairleigh Dickinson ===
Fairleigh Dickinson entered its 2022–23 season under first-year head coach Tobin Anderson. A preseason NEC coaches' poll picked the Knights to finish tied for sixth in their league. The Knights' roster was especially notable for its small physical size—averaging barely over 6 feet 1 inch (1.85 m), with two starting guards being under 5 feet 10 inches (1.78 m), it was the smallest in NCAA Division I men's basketball that season. In the years since the analytics website kenpom.com began tracking average heights of D-I men's rosters in the 2006–07 season, only one other roster had a shorter average height (Grambling State in 2009–10). The team completed the regular season with a 19–15 record and a second-place finish in the NEC.

As the No. 2 seed in the NEC Tournament, they defeated St. Francis Brooklyn and Saint Francis (PA) to advance to the championship game against Merrimack. Because Merrimack was in the last season of a four-year transition period from Division II to Division I, the Knights received the conference's automatic bid to the NCAA tournament, despite losing the conference championship game to Merrimack 66–67.

In the First Four, Fairleigh Dickinson defeated Texas Southern 84–61 to advance to the first round. After the game, Anderson said to the team in the locker room, "The more I watch Purdue, the more I think we can beat them."

=== Purdue ===
Purdue entered its 2022–23 season under 18th-year head coach Matt Painter. Purdue had entered the season unranked but proceeded to win the Big Ten Conference regular-season championship outright by three games. Junior center Zach Edey was named the conference's Player of the Year, Sporting News Player of the Year, and a consensus first-team All-American. In the Big Ten Tournament, they defeated Rutgers, Ohio State, and Penn State, winning the tournament and finishing with a regular season record of 29–5. Purdue entered the tournament seeded fourth overall. As a result, Purdue would face the winner of the First Four match between Fairleigh Dickinson and Texas Southern. Fairleigh Dickinson won the game, 84–61, and would move on to face Purdue. Purdue entered the game the heavy favorite to win, favored by 23.5 points.

== Venue ==
The game was played at the Nationwide Arena in Columbus, Ohio. The attendance for the game was 19,564.

== Broadcast ==
The game was televised nationally on TNT and announced by Andrew Catalon, Steve Lappas, and Jamie Erdahl. The game was played before the start of the Florida Atlantic–Memphis game, which took place in the same venue. The game drew 4.37 million viewers.

== Game summary ==
External videos
- Video highlights on YouTube
- Full game broadcast by TNT on YouTube

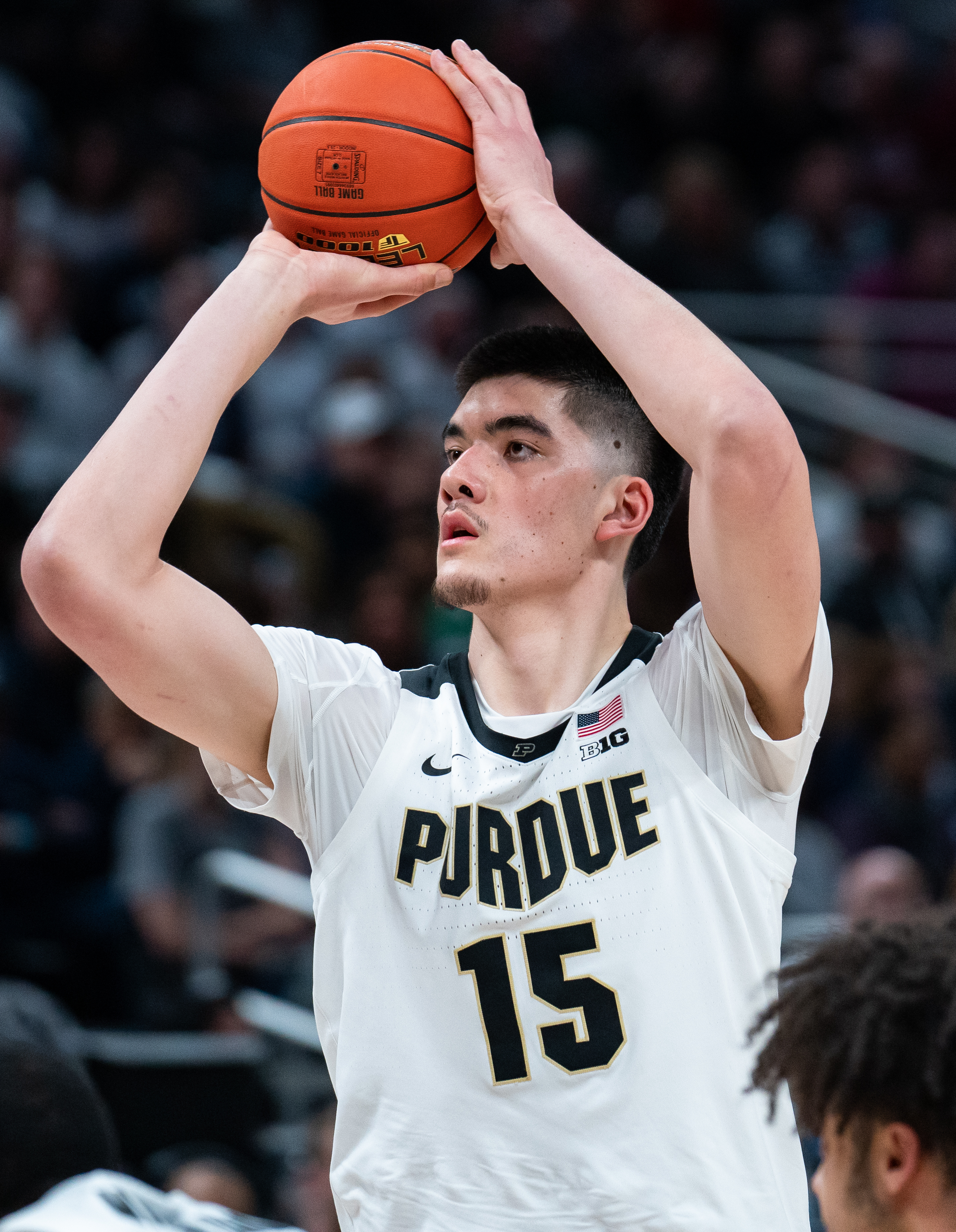
Zach Edey (pictured) scored 21 points for Purdue, the most on his team.

Fairleigh Dickinson started the game off with a 5–2 lead, after a Sean Moore three-pointer. Purdue would then go on a 5–0 run to take a 7–5 lead at the first media timeout. The two teams would continue to trade the lead; the Knights ended up being within one score or having the lead for the first 15 minutes, and a Demetre Roberts three-pointer gave Fairleigh Dickinson a 19–13 lead, their largest of the half. However, an 11–0 Purdue run gave the Boilermakers a five-point lead with five minutes left in the half. Fairleigh Dickinson forced eight turnovers in the first half, including one off a full-court press near the end of the half leading to a Heru Bligen layup that gave the Knights a 32–29 lead, but Purdue's Braden Smith hit two free throws at the end of the half to make it 32–31.

After halftime, Fairleigh Dickinson extended the lead to five at 41–36 by the 14:30 mark, before another 11–0 Purdue run gave them their largest lead of the game. Fairleigh Dickinson, down by six points, went on their own 8–0 run to reclaim the lead, before a Zach Edey tip shot tied the game at 49–49. At the eight-minute mark, an Edey free throw would give Purdue a 50–49 lead, their last of the game; FDU scored the next five points before Purdue's Fletcher Loyer made a three-pointer with 7:09 left to make the score 54–53 Knights. The score remained the same for more than four minutes until two Moore free throws with 2:50 left extended the lead to three. With 1:44 left, Purdue inbounded the ball to Edey near the basket, but Fairleigh Dickinson knocked it away and Sean Moore scored a fast break layup to give FDU a five-point lead. The Boilermakers would respond with a Loyer three-pointer, only for Moore to hit his own three for a 61–56 Knights lead with 1:04 to play. After two Loyer free throws for Purdue made it a one-score game, FDU's Grant Singleton had his shot blocked by Edey on the next possession; on the chase for the rebound, the ball went out of bounds and was initially ruled Fairleigh Dickinson possession. Upon review, replays appeared to show that FDU's Ansley Almonor was fouled while trying to secure the ball, but with the ball touching him last before traveling out of play and without the ability to add fouls during replay, the officials overturned the call and awarded possession to Purdue. With a chance to tie the game, Purdue's Braden Smith had a layup attempt blocked by Moore and Loyer air balled a three-pointer. Roberts rebounded for Fairleigh Dickinson, was fouled with seven seconds remaining, and made both ends of a 1-and-1 free throw situation to give FDU the final winning margin at 63–58.

Moore, a Columbus native, scored a team-high 19 points in the Knights' upset, while Edey scored 21 points and grabbed 15 rebounds in a losing effort for the Boilermakers.

== Box score ==
TNT

Friday, March 17
6:50 p.m. EDT

No. 16 Fairleigh Dickinson Knights 63, No. 1 Purdue Boilermakers 58
Scoring by half: 32–31, 31–27
Pts: S. Moore – 19; Rebs: G. Singleton, C. Tweedy – 6 Asts: G. Singleton – 5	Pts: Z. Edey – 21; Rebs: Z. Edey – 15; Asts: B. Smith – 6

Nationwide Arena – Columbus, OH
Attendance: 19,564
Referees: Chris Beaver, Brian Dorsey, and Clarence Armstrong

Legend
No.	Jersey number	Pos	Position	Min	Minutes played	FGM	Field goals made
FGA	Field goals attempted	3PM	Three-point field goals made	3PA	Three-point field goals attempted	FTM	Free throws made
FTA	Free throws attempted	OReb	Offensive rebounds	Reb	Rebounds	Ast	Assists
Stl	Steals	Blk	Blocks	TO	Turnovers	PF	Personal fouls
Pts	Points

Fairleigh Dickinson Knights
No.	Player	Pos	Min	FGM	FGA	3PM	3PA	FTM	FTA	OReb	Reb	Ast	Stl	Blk	TO	PF	Pts
2	Demetre Roberts	G	32	4	11	1	3	3	3	0	4	4	1	1	2	2	12
1	Joe Munden Jr.	G	20	2	4	1	1	2	3	0	3	0	1	0	1	4	7
4	Grant Singleton	G	34	3	10	2	7	0	0	0	6	5	3	0	0	1	8
5	Ansley Almonor	F	25	0	4	0	2	1	2	2	2	0	2	0	2	3	1
11	Sean Moore	F	28	7	17	3	10	2	2	2	5	0	1	2	1	4	19
13	Jo'el Emanuel	F	8	0	1	0	0	0	0	0	0	0	0	0	1	1	0
3	Heru Bligen	G	19	3	8	0	0	0	0	1	2	0	2	0	0	1	6
24	Brayden Reynolds	G	12	0	1	0	0	0	0	0	0	0	0	0	1	2	0
21	Cameron Tweedy	F	17	5	6	0	0	0	0	4	6	0	1	0	0	1	10
Team totals				24	62	7	23	8	10	11	33	11	11	3	9	19	63

Purdue Boilermakers
No.	Player	Pos	Min	FGM	FGA	3PM	3PA	FTM	FTA	OReb	Reb	Ast	Stl	Blk	TO	PF	Pts
3	Braden Smith	G	34	2	10	1	6	2	2	0	3	6	2	0	7	3	7
2	Fletcher Loyer	G	27	4	10	3	8	2	2	0	2	1	0	0	3	2	13
15	Zach Edey	C	35	7	11	0	0	7	10	6	15	1	0	3	2	1	21
0	Mason Gillis	F	30	3	10	1	7	3	3	3	7	3	0	1	1	3	10
5	Brandon Newman	G	15	1	4	0	1	0	0	1	4	2	0	0	2	0	2
4	Trey Kaufman-Renn	F	7	0	1	0	0	1	2	0	0	0	0	1	0	1	1
1	Caleb Furst	F	9	2	2	0	0	0	0	1	2	1	0	0	0	1	4
14	David Jenkins Jr.	G	22	0	3	0	2	0	0	0	2	0	0	0	1	1	0
25	Ethan Morton	G	17	0	2	0	2	0	0	0	1	1	1	1	0	1	0
Team totals				19	53	5	26	15	19	15	42	15	3	6	16	13	58

== Aftermath ==
In its immediate aftermath, the game was considered possibly the biggest upset in tournament history, mainly owing to Fairleigh Dickinson's significant underdog status; besides being the largest upset of all time by point spread, Fairleigh Dickinson had entered the tournament as the 68th and last-ranked team overall, and it had received the Northeast Conference's automatic bid despite losing the conference championship game (champion Merrimack was ineligible due to its transition from Division II). FDU's 2022–23 strength of schedule ranked 363rd and last in Division I according to kenpom.com; also, as noted previously, FDU's roster per KenPom.com was the shortest overall in Division I, and defeated a team with all-American center Zach Edey, who was one of the tallest players in college basketball at 7 feet 4 inches.

Purdue became the first team in tournament history to lose in consecutive years to 15-seeds or worse, having previously been eliminated by 15-seed Saint Peter's in the Sweet 16 of the 2022 tournament.

Fairleigh Dickinson advanced to the Round of 32, in which it faced the 9-seed Florida Atlantic Owls on March 19, 2023. It was competitive throughout the majority of the game, and the Knights led throughout the first ten minutes of the second half. However, the Owls won the game 78–70, thus ending FDU's two-game Cinderella run. Florida Atlantic then went on a Cinderella run of their own, defeating No. 4 seed Tennessee 62–55 in the Sweet 16 and No. 3 seed Kansas State 79–76 in the Elite Eight to become the second 9-seed to advance to the Final Four since the tournament expanded to 64 teams in 1985. The Owls' season ended with a 72–71 loss to San Diego State after the Aztecs' Lamont Butler hit a jump shot at the buzzer.

Two days after the Knights' loss to Florida Atlantic, head coach Tobin Anderson announced his departure from FDU after just one year to accept the head coaching position at Iona, which had its head coaching spot recently vacated by Rick Pitino, who departed after three seasons to coach at St. John's.

The first-round loss by East No. 1 seed Purdue, second-round loss by West No. 1 seed Kansas, and Sweet 16 losses by South No. 1 seed Alabama and Midwest No. 1 seed Houston, led to the 2023 tournament becoming the first ever to have none of its top seeds advance to the Elite Eight.

Before the game, CBSSports.com reported there were 22 perfect brackets left in their March Madness tournament. After Purdue's loss however, it was reported that there were no longer any perfect brackets remaining, only two days after the tournament started.

== See also ==
- 2019 Tampa Bay Lightning–Columbus Blue Jackets playoff series, a playoff series upset also involving Nationwide Arena
- 2018 UMBC vs. Virginia men's basketball game, in which the 16-seed UMBC beat 1-seed Virginia
- 1998 Harvard vs. Stanford women's basketball game, in which the 16-seed Harvard team beat 1-seed Stanford
- 1989 Georgetown vs. Princeton men's basketball game, in which 16-seed Princeton nearly beat 1-seed Georgetown
