= 2022–23 Fairleigh Dickinson Knights men's basketball team =

American college basketball season

2022–23 Fairleigh Dickinson Knights men's basketball

NCAA tournament, Second round
- Conference: Northeast Conference
- Record: 21–16 (10–6 NEC)
- Head coach: Tobin Anderson (1st season)
- Assistant coaches: Jack Castleberry; Tom Bonacum; Kam Murrell
- Home arena: Rothman Center

2022–23 Northeast Conference men's basketball standings
	Conf.				Overall
Team	W		L	PCT	W		L	PCT
Merrimack*†	12	–	4	.750	18	–	16	.529
Fairleigh Dickinson^	10	–	6	.625	21	–	16	.568
Stonehill**	10	–	6	.625	14	–	17	.452
Saint Francis (PA)	9	–	7	.563	13	–	18	.419
Sacred Heart	8	–	8	.500	16	–	17	.485
Wagner	8	–	8	.500	15	–	13	.536
Central Connecticut	7	–	9	.438	10	–	22	.313
St. Francis Brooklyn	7	–	9	.438	14	–	16	.467
LIU	1	–	15	.063	3	–	26	.103
† 2023 NEC tournament winner: * ineligible for the 2023 NCAA tournament due to transition period; ** ineligible for both the 2023 NEC tournament and the 2023 NCAA tournament due to transition period; ^ received automatic bid for the 2023 NCAA tournament as conference tournament runner-up, due to Merrimack's ineligibility

The 2022–23 Fairleigh Dickinson Knights men's basketball team represented Fairleigh Dickinson University in the 2022–23 NCAA Division I men's basketball season. The Knights, led by first-year head coach Tobin Anderson, played their home games at the Rothman Center in Hackensack, New Jersey as members of the Northeast Conference (NEC).

They finished the regular season 17–14, 10–6 in NEC play, to finish in a tie for second place. As the No. 2 seed in the NEC tournament, they defeated St. Francis Brooklyn in the quarterfinals and Saint Francis (PA) in the semifinals. In a unique circumstance, the semifinal between Saint Francis (PA) and Fairleigh Dickinson decided the NEC's automatic bid to the NCAA tournament because Merrimack was in a transition period from Division II to Division I and ineligible for the tournament. The Knights lost in the championship game to Merrimack, but still earned a No. 16 seed in the East region. In the First Four, they defeated Texas Southern to advance to the first round. There they became only the second No. 16 seed ever to upset a No. 1 seed by defeating Purdue, in the biggest upset in NCAA tournament history in terms of point spread. The Knights lost in the second round to eventual Final Four participant Florida Atlantic.

On March 21, 2023, head coach Tobin Anderson left the school to become the head coach at Iona. The same day, the school promoted assistant coach Jack Castleberry to head coach.

== Previous season ==
The Knights finished the 2021–22 season 4–22, 5–13 in NEC play, to finish tied for last place. As the No. 8 seed, they were defeated by Central Connecticut in the first round of the NEC tournament.

On April 25, 2022, the school announced that they were parting ways with head coach Greg Herenda after nine years at the position. On May 2, Tobin Anderson, head coach at St. Thomas Aquinas, was named as the Knights' next head coach.

== Roster ==
2022–23 Fairleigh Dickinson Knights men's basketball team
Players
Coaches

Pos.	#	Name	Height	Weight	Year	Hometown
G	1	Joe Jr. Munden	6 ft 3 in (1.91 m)	188 lb (85 kg)	Jr	Harlem, NY
G	2	Demetre Roberts	5 ft 8 in (1.73 m)	165 lb (75 kg)	GS	Mount Vernon, NY
G	3	Heru Bligen	6 ft 2 in (1.88 m)	183 lb (83 kg)	Sr	Glenn Dale, MD
G	4	Grant Singleton	5 ft 9 in (1.75 m)	163 lb (74 kg)	GS	Sumter, SC
F	5	Ansley Almonor	6 ft 6 in (1.98 m)	219 lb (99 kg)	So	Spring Valley, NY
F	11	Sean Moore	6 ft 4 in (1.93 m)	175 lb (79 kg)	Jr	Columbus, OH
G	12	Sébastien Lamaute	6 ft 1 in (1.85 m)	198 lb (90 kg)	Jr	Saint-Bruno-de-Montarville, QC
F	13	Jo'el Emanuel	6 ft 6 in (1.98 m)	196 lb (89 kg)	Fr	Suffern, NY
F	14	Pier-Olivier Racine	6 ft 7 in (2.01 m)	232 lb (105 kg)	Jr	Gatineau, QC
F	21	Cameron Tweedy	6 ft 4 in (1.93 m)	222 lb (101 kg)	So	Waldorf, MD
G	22	Trevon Blassingame	6 ft 4 in (1.93 m)	173 lb (78 kg)	Fr	Auburn, WA
G	24	Brayden Reynolds	6 ft 1 in (1.85 m)	194 lb (88 kg)	Fr	Pittsburgh, PA
F	25	Daniel Rodriguez	6 ft 5 in (1.96 m)	215 lb (98 kg)	Sr	Newark, NY

Head coach

- Tobin Anderson (Wesleyan)

Assistant coach(es)

- Jack Castleberry (VMI)
- Tom Bonacum (Ramapo)
- Kam Murrell (Memphis)

Legend

- (C) Team captain
- (S) Suspended
- (I) Ineligible
- (W) Walk-on
- Injured
- Current redshirt

Roster
Last update: November 1, 2022

== Schedule and results ==
Date time, TV	Rank^{#}	Opponent^{#}	Result	Record	Site (attendance) city, state
Regular season
November 7, 2022*; 8:00 p.m., NBCSCHI+/ESPN+		at Loyola–Chicago	L 82–88 ^{OT}	0–1	Gentile Arena (3,609); Chicago, IL
November 9, 2022*; 7:00 p.m., NEC Front Row		Mercy (NY)	W 106–66	1–1	Rothman Center (335); Hackensack, NJ
November 13, 2022*; 2:00 p.m., NEC Front Row		Manhattan	W 77–74	2–1	Rothman Center (336); Hackensack, NJ
November 18, 2022*; 7:00 p.m., ESPN+		vs. SIU Edwardsville; Longwood MTE	L 78–79	2–2	Willett Hall (173); Farmville, VA
November 19, 2022*; 5:00 p.m., ESPN+		at Longwood; Longwood MTE	L 83–99	2–3	Willett Hall (1,321); Farmville, VA
November 20, 2022*; 4:00 p.m., ESPN+		vs. VMI; Longwood MTE	W 93–89	3–3	Willett Hall (132); Farmville, VA
November 22, 2022*; 8:30 p.m., ACCN		at Pittsburgh	L 61–83	3–4	Petersen Events Center (5,455); Pittsburgh, PA
November 27, 2022*; 2:00 p.m., ESPN+		at Saint Peter's	L 63–77	3–5	Run Baby Run Arena (532); Jersey City, NJ
November 30, 2022*; 7:00 p.m.		at Hartford	L 66–74	3–6	Chase Arena (288); West Hartford, CT
December 3, 2022*; 1:00 p.m., ESPN+		at Saint Joseph's	W 97–80	4–6	Hagan Arena (1,162); Philadelphia, PA
December 9, 2022*; 7:00 p.m., SNY/ESPN+		at Columbia	W 76–73 ^{OT}	5–6	Levien Gymnasium (527); New York, NY
December 11, 2022*; 2:00 p.m., NEC Front Row		NJIT	W 73–71	6–6	Rothman Center (437); Hackensack, NJ
December 13, 2022*; 7:00 p.m., MASN/ESPN+		at Richmond	L 48–77	6–7	Robins Center (5,004); Richmond, VA
December 22, 2022*; 7:00 p.m., NEC Front Row		Queens	L 73–82	6–8	Rothman Center (950); Hackensack, NJ
December 29, 2022; 7:00 p.m., NEC Front Row		Merrimack	W 71–63	7–8 (1–0)	Rothman Center (559); Hackensack, NJ
December 31, 2022*; 12:00 p.m., NEC Front Row		Centenary (NJ)	W 99–50	8–8	Rothman Center (232); Hackensack, NJ
January 5, 2023; 1:00 p.m., NEC Front Row		at St. Francis Brooklyn	W 76–57	9–8 (2–0)	Pratt ARC (225); Brooklyn, NY
January 7, 2023; 1:00 p.m., NEC Front Row		LIU	W 101–89	10–8 (3–0)	Rothman Center (548); Hackensack, NJ
January 14, 2023; 1:00 p.m., NEC Front Row		at Central Connecticut	W 88–80	11–8 (4–0)	William H. Detrick Gymnasium (1,021); New Britain, CT
January 16, 2023; 7:00 p.m., NEC Front Row		at Stonehill	W 65–57	12–8 (5–0)	Merkert Gymnasium (706); Easton, MA
January 20, 2023; 7:00 p.m., NEC Front Row		Sacred Heart	L 85–92	12–9 (5–1)	Rothman Center (276); Hackensack, NJ
January 22, 2023; 6:00 p.m., NEC Front Row		Stonehill	L 59–70	12–10 (5–2)	Rothman Center (1,115); Hackensack, NJ
January 26, 2023; 7:00 p.m., NEC Front Row		Saint Francis (PA)	W 87–82	13–10 (6–2)	Rothman Center (1,003); Hackensack, NJ
January 28, 2023; 3:00 p.m., ESPN3		at Merrimack	W 78–71	14–10 (7–2)	Hammel Court (833); North Andover, MA
February 4, 2023; 1:00 p.m., NEC Front Row		Wagner	L 79–83	14–11 (7–3)	Rothman Center (1,075); Hackensack, NJ
February 9, 2023; 7:00 p.m., NEC Front Row		at LIU	W 80–79	15–11 (8–3)	Steinberg Wellness Center (275); Brooklyn, NY
February 11, 2023; 5:00 p.m., ESPN+		Central Connecticut	L 73–77	15–12 (8–4)	Rothman Center (519); Hackensack, NJ
February 16, 2023; 7:00 p.m., NEC Front Row		at Sacred Heart	L 86–94 ^{OT}	15–13 (8–5)	William H. Pitt Center (828); Fairfield, CT
February 18, 2023; 4:00 p.m., NEC Front Row		at Wagner	W 66–48	16–13 (9–5)	Spiro Sports Center (606); Staten Island, NY
February 23, 2023; 7:00 p.m., NEC Front Row		at Saint Francis (PA)	L 72–82	16–14 (9–6)	DeGol Arena (798); Loretto, PA
February 25, 2023; 1:00 p.m., NEC Front Row		St. Francis Brooklyn	W 86–69	17–14 (10–6)	Rothman Center (923); Hackensack, NJ
NEC tournament
March 1, 2023; 7:00 p.m., NEC Front Row	(2)	(7) St. Francis Brooklyn; Quarterfinal	W 83–75	18–14	Rothman Center (887); Hackensack, NJ
March 4, 2023; 8:00 p.m., ESPN3	(2)	(3) Saint Francis (PA); Semifinal	W 70–50	19–14	Rothman Center (1,207); Hackensack, NJ
March 7, 2023; 7:00 p.m., ESPN2	(2)	at (1) Merrimack; Championship	L 66–67	19–15	Lawler Arena (2,214); North Andover, MA
NCAA tournament
March 15, 2023*; 6:40 p.m., truTV	(16 E)	vs. (16 E) Texas Southern; First Four	W 84–61	20–15	UD Arena (12,431); Dayton, OH
March 17, 2023*; 6:50 p.m., TNT	(16 E)	vs. (1 E) No. 3 Purdue; First round	W 63–58	21–15	Nationwide Arena (19,564); Columbus, OH
March 19, 2023*; 7:45 p.m., truTV	(16 E)	vs. (9 E) No. 25 Florida Atlantic; Second round	L 70–78	21–16	Nationwide Arena (19,566); Columbus, OH
*Non-conference game. ^{#}Rankings from AP poll. (#) Tournament seedings in parentheses. E=East. All times are in Eastern.
