= Ryan Odom =

American basketball player and coach (born 1974)

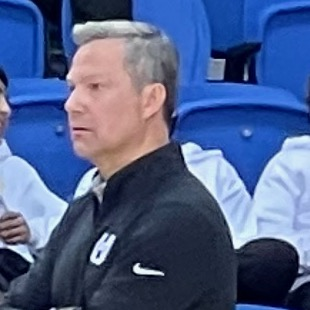
- Odom in 2023

Current position
- Title: Head coach
- Team: Virginia
- Conference: ACC
- Record: 37–6 (.860)

Biographical details
- Born: July 11, 1974 (age 52); Durham, North Carolina, U.S.

Playing career
- 1992–1996: Hampden–Sydney
- Position: Point guard

Coaching career (HC unless noted)
- 1996–1997: South Florida (GA)
- 1997–1999: Furman (assistant)
- 1999–2000: UNC Asheville (assistant)
- 2000–2003: American (assistant)
- 2003–2010: Virginia Tech (assistant)
- 2010–2015: Charlotte (assistant / associate HC)
- 2015: Charlotte (interim HC)
- 2015–2016: Lenoir–Rhyne
- 2016–2021: UMBC
- 2021–2023: Utah State
- 2023–2025: VCU
- 2025–present: Virginia

Head coaching record
- Overall: 259–133 (.661)
- Tournaments: 2–4 (NCAA Division I); 2–1 (NCAA Division II); 2–2 (NIT); 3–1 (CIT)

Accomplishments and honors

Championships
- America East tournament (2018); America East regular season (2021); Atlantic 10 regular season (2025); Atlantic 10 tournament (2025)

Awards
- Joe B. Hall Award (2017); Hugh Durham Award (2018); America East Coach of the Year (2021)

Ryan Odom (born July 11, 1974) is an American college basketball coach who serves as the head men's basketball coach at the University of Virginia. He previously coached at Lenoir-Rhyne, UMBC, Utah State, and VCU, taking each of the five programs he has coached to the NCAA tournament by his second year.

Odom has many unique ties to the Virginia program having run the gamut from being a ball boy in University Hall through the 1980s to being the coach who defeated No. 1 seed Virginia—the first NCAA Round of 64 win by a men's No. 16 seed—in 2018. His father is Dave Odom, former UVA assistant coach (1982–1989) and former head coach at Wake Forest and South Carolina. Odom was awarded the Hugh Durham National Coach of the Year Award in 2018 and was the America East Coach of the Year in 2021.

As a player, Odom holds Hampden–Sydney Tigers all-time records (as of 2025) for most three-point field goals in a season and most consecutive games with a three-point field goal.

== Early life and education ==
Odom was born in Durham, North Carolina, when his father was the high school basketball coach at the former Durham High School. Odom lived in Charlottesville from third through tenth grade. During this time, he would ride his bike to University Hall to watch UVA teams at practice and was a ball boy for their home games. He recalls being in attendance when Virginia defeated Indiana and advanced to the 1984 Final Four to face Houston's Phi Slama Jama and star Hakeem Olajuwon.

After his father was named head coach at Wake Forest, Odom graduated from Richard J. Reynolds High School in Winston-Salem, North Carolina, in 1992. He went on to graduate from Hampden–Sydney College in 1996, with a degree in economics. His father, Dave, was surprised that his son went into coaching and figured he would "make millions" on Wall Street for his career instead.

== Playing career ==
Odom was a four-year starting point guard for the Hampden–Sydney Tigers under head coach Tony Shaver, serving as team captain his senior year. He led the Tigers to the NCAA Division III Elite Eight in 1995 and left ranked as the school's all-time leader in three-point field goals as well as fourth in assists. As of 2025, Odom still holds the Hampden-Sydney records for most three-point field goals in a season, with 82 in 1994–95, and most consecutive games with a three-point field goal, with 24 in 1995–96.

== Coaching career ==
Odom began his coaching career as a graduate assistant at South Florida. He also had stops as an assistant coach with Furman, UNC Asheville, and American, before spending seven years on the staff of former Virginia Tech Head Coach Seth Greenberg. In 2010, he joined the coaching staff of Charlotte, serving as an assistant for five years, including being interim head coach. Odom accepted his first head coaching job at Lenoir-Rhyne, leading the Bears to the quarterfinals of the NCAA Division II tournament in his only season at the helm, before accepting the head coaching position at UMBC, replacing Aki Thomas.

=== UMBC ===
In his first season at the helm of the Retrievers, Odom orchestrated a 14-win improvement over the team's 7–25 season the previous year to a 21–13 overall record, and fifth-place finish in the America East Conference. The 21 wins are second-most in school history. For its efforts, UMBC accepted a bid to the 2017 CollegeInsider.com Postseason Tournament, where it won its first round matchup against Fairfield for the first postseason win in program history. From there the Retrievers defeated St. Francis (PA) in the second round and advanced past Liberty in the CIT quarterfinals before falling to Texas A&M–Corpus Christi in the semi-finals.

The 2017–18 regular season saw the Retrievers finish in second place in the America East, with a 12–4 record, and earning the conference's automatic berth into the NCAA Tournament when it knocked off Vermont 65–62 in the 2018 America East men's basketball tournament final, earning its second-ever NCAA Tournament appearance. During the 2018 NCAA tournament, the Retrievers became the first No. 16 seed to win in the first round with a 74–54 victory over Virginia. After the historic win, the Retrievers lost in the second round to Kansas State, 50–43. The following season, Odom led the Retrievers to another 20-win season and another appearance in the 2019 America East tournament final, where it fell to Vermont. In his final year at UMBC, Odom guided the Retrievers to a share of the America East regular season crown for the first time since 2008.

=== Utah State ===
In April 2021, Odom was announced as the head coach at Utah State. In his two years at Utah State he led the team to a 44–25 record and a berth in the NCAA Division I tournament in 2023.

=== VCU ===
Odom was named the men's basketball coach for Virginia Commonwealth University Rams in March 2023. In his two years at VCU he led the team to a 52–21 record.

==== 2023–24: NIT Quarterfinals ====
When Odom was announced as the next VCU coach, just five scholarship players remained on the team with virtually all key players having entered the transfer portal immediately after Mike Rhoades left the program. Odom wasted no time in rebuilding the roster with Richmond, Virginia, native Joe Bamisile transferring in from Oklahoma and Max Shulga following Odom from Utah State. The two guards would go on to lead the Rams in scoring for both years of Odom's tenure. With Odom at the helm, VCU exacted revenge on their former coach, defeating Rhoades' Penn State squad 86–74. In the 2024 National Invitation Tournament, VCU defeated No. 1 seed Villanova on their home floor and advanced to the quarterfinals before losing to No. 2 seed Utah.

==== 2024–25: Atlantic 10 Tournament and regular season champions ====
In the 2024–25 season the Rams were the Atlantic 10 Conference favorites from beginning to end, having been voted the No. 1 team in the conference in the pre-season. In the early season, VCU won the Veterans Classic against ACC team Boston College, 80–55, in Annapolis, Maryland. The Rams went on to win both the Atlantic 10 Conference regular-season and Atlantic 10 Men's Basketball Tournament championships, winning 18 of their final 20 games en route to a No. 11 seed in the NCAA tournament, where they lost to No. 6 seed BYU in the first round. For the season, VCU ranked No. 1 in the nation for defensive effective field goal percentage.

=== Virginia ===
Odom was named the men's basketball coach for the University of Virginia Cavaliers on March 21, 2025. His first recruit to UVA, point guard Chance Mallory, committed to the program hours later on the same day. The VCU Athletics Department released a statement that read in part: "We made a very competitive offer for him to remain as our coach, yet support him fully as he returns to a university so close to his heart"; a Richmond Times-Dispatch headline read "Odom-to-UVa was written in the stars" because "for the Odoms, Charlottesville has always been home" and all the ways Odom and UVA have crossed paths throughout the years. Odom's VCU squad had defeated UVA in a "secret scrimmage" in October before the season, 71–49, which may have also helped get the program ball rolling toward Odom very soon after Tony Bennett's surprise October retirement.

==== 2025–26: 30 wins and 15–3 in ACC ====
With the modern dynamics of the NCAA transfer portal in full effect, Odom arrived at UVA with only one remaining scholarship player, Elijah Gertrude, remained from the previous season’s 15–17 team, Virginia’s first losing record since the 2000s. Odom assembled a roster tailored to his preferred fast-paced style, bringing in high school recruits Chance Mallory and Silas Barksdale, experienced transfers from across the country, and international players. Odom's first UVA team exceeded pre-season expectations and doubled the previous year's win total, going 30–6 and 15–3 in the ACC, finishing second of 18 teams in the ACC regular season and Runners Up in the ACC Tournament. Controversial out of bounds and foul calls in the final minute helped seal their fate in the NCAA Tournament against Tennessee. Odom's 30 wins at Virginia were the most for a first-year coach of an NCAA program since Tommy Lloyd won 33 in 2021-22 at Arizona and the most for a first-year ACC coach since Bill Guthridge won 34 in 1997–98 at North Carolina.

== Personal life ==
Odom is married and has two children.

His son Connor, who played for him at Utah State and VCU, was one of two recipients of the USBWA Most Courageous Award in 2023. (Note: The USBWA presents separate versions of this award in men's and women's college basketball; the women's version is titled the Pat Summitt Most Courageous Award.) Connor received the award for his advocacy on mental health issues after going public about struggles with anxiety and obsessive–compulsive disorder following a teenage bout with Lyme disease. He shared the award with Saint Louis's Terrence Hargrove, another player who openly discussed mental health issues.

== Head coaching record ==
Record table
Season	Team	Overall	Conference	Standing	Postseason
Charlotte 49ers (Conference USA) (2015)
2014–15*	Charlotte*	8–11*	7–11*	11th*	
Charlotte:		8–11 (.421)	7–11 (.389)		
Lenoir–Rhyne Bears (South Atlantic Conference) (2015–2016)
2015–16	Lenoir–Rhyne	21–10	14–8	4th	NCAA Division II Sweet 16
Lenoir–Rhyne:		21–10 (.677)	14–8 (.636)		
UMBC Retrievers (America East Conference) (2016–2021)
2016–17	UMBC	21–13	9–7	5th	CIT semifinal
2017–18	UMBC	25–11	12–4	2nd	NCAA Division I Round of 32
2018–19	UMBC	21–13	11–5	3rd	
2019–20	UMBC	16–17	8–8	4th	No postseason held
2020–21	UMBC	14–6	10–4	T–1st	
UMBC:		97–60 (.618)	50–28 (.641)		
Utah State Aggies (Mountain West Conference) (2021–2023)
2021–22	Utah State	18–16	8–10	7th	NIT first round
2022–23	Utah State	26–9	13–5	T–2nd	NCAA Division I Round of 64
Utah State:		44–25 (.638)	21–15 (.583)		
VCU Rams (Atlantic 10 Conference) (2023–2025)
2023–24	VCU	24–14	11–7	T–4th	NIT Quarterfinals
2024–25	VCU	28–7	15–3	T–1st	NCAA Division I Round of 64
VCU:		52–21 (.712)	26–10 (.722)		
Virginia Cavaliers (Atlantic Coast Conference) (2025–present)
2025–26	Virginia	30–6	15–3	2nd	NCAA Division I Round of 32
2026–27	Virginia	7–0	0–0		
Virginia:		37–6 (.860)	15–3 (.833)		
Total:		259–133 (.661)			
National champion Postseason invitational champion Conference regular season champion Conference regular season and conference tournament champion Division regular season champion Division regular season and conference tournament champion Conference tournament champion

*Charlotte head coach Alan Major took an indefinite leave of absence due to medical reasons on January 6, 2015. Charlotte's record at the time was 6–7 (0–1 C-USA).
