= Jairus Lyles =

American basketball player (born 1995)

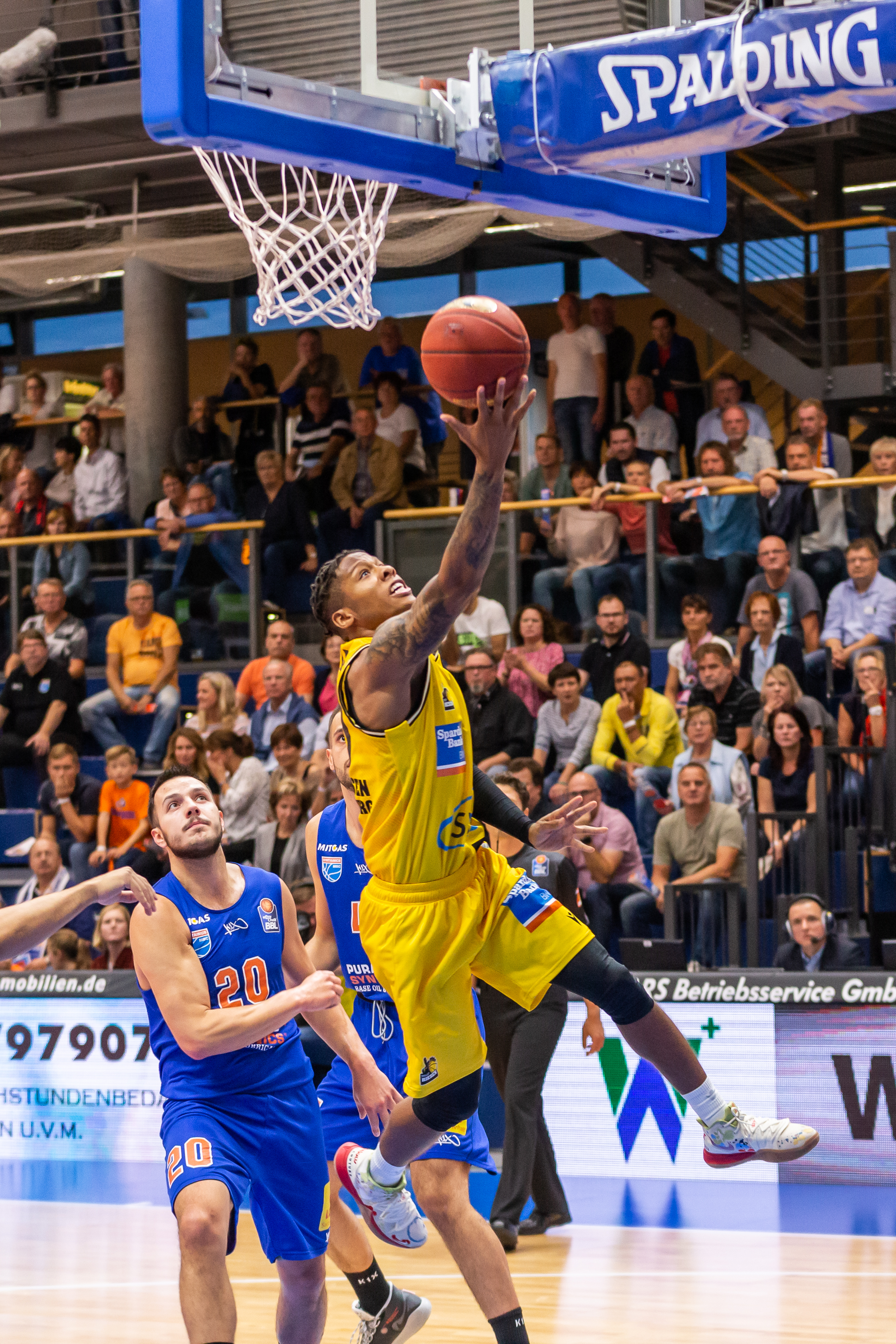
- Lyles in action with MHP Riesen Ludwigsburg

Personal information
- Born: July 6, 1995 (age 31) Silver Spring, Maryland, U.S.
- Listed height: 6 ft 2 in (1.88 m)
- Listed weight: 175 lb (79 kg)

Career information
- High school: DeMatha Catholic (Hyattsville, Maryland)
- College: VCU (2013–2014); UMBC (2015–2018)
- NBA draft: 2018: undrafted
- Playing career: 2018–2020
- Position: Point guard

Career history
- 2018–2019: Salt Lake City Stars
- 2019: MHP Riesen Ludwigsburg
- 2019–2020: Löwen Braunschweig

Career highlights
- First-team All-America East (2018); 2× Second-team All-America East (2016, 2017); America East tournament MVP (2018)
- Stats at Basketball Reference

Jairus Lyles (born July 6, 1995) is an American former professional basketball player. He played college basketball for the UMBC Retrievers. He also competed for the VCU Rams in his freshman season but played a limited role before transferring. Prior to college, Lyles attended DeMatha Catholic High School in Hyattsville, Maryland, where he was a three-star recruit. At UMBC, he earned all-conference honors for three consecutive years. He most notably led the Retrievers to a first-round victory over Virginia at the 2018 NCAA tournament, the first time a 16-seed defeated a 1-seed in men's tournament history.

== Early life ==
Lyles was born in Silver Spring, Maryland to Lester Lyles and Carol Motley. His father Lester was a four-year football player for the Virginia Cavaliers, for whom he won the 1984 Peach Bowl, before spending seven seasons in the National Football League (NFL). His mother Carol attended the University of Virginia as well. In addition, Lyles' sister Symone played four seasons of basketball for the Ohio Bobcats. His parents later divorced, and Jairus was mainly raised by his mother.

== High school career ==
Lyles attended DeMatha Catholic High School in Hyattsville, Maryland, where he was a combo guard. As a freshman, he was teammates with future NBA All-Star player Victor Oladipo. In his junior season, he averaged 11 points and three assists per game and helped his team reach the Washington Catholic Athletic Conference (WCAC) finals. As a senior, he averaged 13.4 points and 4.3 assists per game but his team finished with a 14–17 record, one of the worst seasons in program history. Lyles also played for Team Takeover on the Amateur Athletic Union (AAU) circuit, competing alongside Josh Hart. Lyles was rated a consensus three-star recruit and chose to play for VCU in college despite drawing interest from Oklahoma State, who gave him an offer, as well as Penn State and Virginia Tech.

College recruiting
Name	Hometown	School	Height	Weight	Commit date
Jairus Lyles; PG	Silver Spring, MD	DeMatha Catholic High School (MD)	6 ft 1 in (1.85 m)	173 lb (78 kg)	Jul 1, 2012
Jairus Lyles; PG	Recruit ratings: Rivals: 247Sports: ESPN: (74)				
Overall recruit ranking: 247Sports: #197
Note: In many cases, Scout, Rivals, 247Sports, On3, and ESPN may conflict in their listings of height and weight.; In these cases, the average was taken. ESPN grades are on a 100-point scale.; Sources:

== College career ==
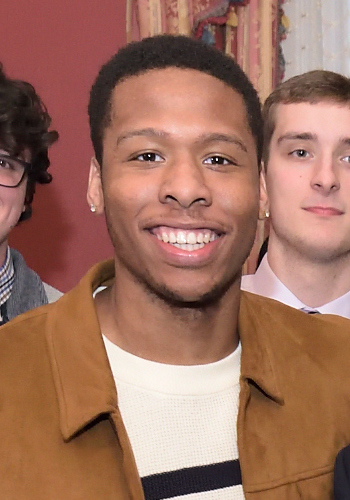
Lyles in 2018

Lyles competed for the VCU Rams as a freshman in 2013–14 under head coach Shaka Smart, averaging 0.7 points, 0.2 rebounds and 0.3 assists in only 2.9 minutes per game. He only recorded two field goals in the season, scoring a season-high three points on two occasions, against Fordham and Rhode Island. Following the season, he transferred to play for Robert Morris but was forced to sit out in 2014–15 due to eligibility rules. After one semester at Robert Morris, Lyles transferred to the University of Maryland, Baltimore County (UMBC), where he would play for the Retrievers starting in the 2015–16 season. He made an instant impact as a sophomore for UMBC, averaging 23.0 points, 5.5 rebounds and 2.8 assists per game and garnering second-team All-America East Conference accolades. In his junior season, Lyles averaged 18.9 points, 6.6 rebounds and 2.6 assists en route to second-team All-America East honors. He scored a total of 604 points, breaking the school record for most points by a junior.

"I think it started on the defensive end for us. We pressured their guards a lot of. Didn't give them any open looks. We made their bigs work and they got frustrated and it helped us on our offensive end because they kind of got distracted, got inside them so they're not hitting shots and running their offense like they usually do. They had defensive breakdowns and we kind of took advantage of that."

— Lyles reflects on his team's historic win over Virginia at the 2018 NCAA tournament.

Lyles made his senior debut on November 10, 2017, in a loss to SMU, scoring 24 points with five assists for UMBC. In his next game, he recorded 31 points, five rebounds, four assists and three steals in a defeat to Arizona. On November 19, Lyles had a double-double of 26 points and 11 rebounds against Colgate. He scored a season-best 35 points to help UMBC beat Hartford on January 15, 2018. By the end of his regular season campaign, Lyles was named first-team All-America East. On March 10, in the championship game of the 2018 America East tournament vs. Vermont, Lyles scored 27 points, including a game-winning three-pointer with 0.5 seconds left in regulation. He was named most outstanding player (MOP) of the tournament. On March 16, at the first round of the 2018 NCAA Division I men's basketball tournament, Lyles notched a game-high 28 points, shooting 9-of-11 from the field, to lead UMBC to a 20-point upset over top-seeded Virginia. The game marked the first time in tournament history that a 16-seed defeated a 1-seed. After his performance, Lyles drew national attention, being featured in stories by The Washington Post and USA Today.

== Professional career ==
Lyles went undrafted in the 2018 NBA draft but subsequently joined the Utah Jazz for the NBA Summer League. He was the first Retriever to play in the NBA Summer League. On July 12, 2018, he signed with the Utah Jazz. After appearing in five preseason games, Lyles was waived on October 14. The Jazz added Lyles to their NBA G League affiliate, the Salt Lake City Stars.

On July 25, 2019, Lyles signed with MHP Riesen Ludwigsburg of the Basketball Bundesliga. On December 15, 2019, he signed with Löwen Braunschweig of the German Basketball Bundesliga (BBL). Lyles signed with Krka of the Slovenian League and ABA League Second Division on July 14, 2020. However, he never played for the team.

== Career statistics ==
Legend
GP	Games played	GS	Games started	MPG	Minutes per game
FG%	Field goal percentage	3P%	3-point field goal percentage	FT%	Free throw percentage
RPG	Rebounds per game	APG	Assists per game	SPG	Steals per game
BPG	Blocks per game	PPG	Points per game	**Bold**	Career high

=== College ===
Year	Team	GP	GS	MPG	FG%	3P%	FT%	RPG	APG	SPG	BPG	PPG
2013–14	VCU	22	0	2.6	.100	.125	.667	.2	.2	.2	.0	.6
2015–16	UMBC	21	19	**36.2**	**.472**	.342	.698	5.5	2.8	**2.5**	.0	**23.0**
2016–17	UMBC	32	31	34.6	.442	.319	.728	**6.6**	2.6	1.7	.0	18.9
2017–18	UMBC	**33**	**32**	34.9	.439	**.390**	**.792**	5.5	**3.5**	2.1	**.2**	20.2
Career		108	82	28.5	.444	.352	.739	4.8	2.4	1.7	.1	16.3

== See also ==
- 2018 UMBC vs. Virginia men's basketball game
