= Tobin Anderson =

American basketball coach (born 1971)

Current position
- Title: Head coach
- Team: Tennessee Tech
- Conference: SoCon

Biographical details
- Born: December 1, 1971 (age 54); Truro, Iowa, U.S.

Playing career
- 1991–1995: Wesleyan

Coaching career (HC unless noted)
- 1996–1997: Clarkson (assistant)
- 1997–1999: Le Moyne (assistant)
- 1999–2004: Clarkson
- 2004–2011: Hamilton
- 2011–2013: Siena (assistant)
- 2013–2022: St. Thomas Aquinas
- 2022–2023: Fairleigh Dickinson
- 2023–2025: Iona
- 2025–2026: South Florida (special asst. to HC)
- 2026–present: Tennessee Tech

Head coaching record
- Overall: 444–241 (.648)
- Tournaments: 2–1 (NCAA Division I); 9–6 (NCAA Division II); 1–1 (NCAA Division III)

Accomplishments and honors

Championships
- Liberty League tournament (2006); 3 Liberty League regular season (2006, 2007, 2009); 6 ECC tournament (2016–2018, 2020–2022); 5 ECC regular season (2015–2017, 2021, 2022)

Tobin Anderson (born December 1, 1971) is an American basketball coach who is currently the head coach of the Tennessee Tech Golden Eagles men's basketball team. He was previously the head coach of the Fairleigh Dickinson Knights men's basketball team for the 2022–23 season, where he led them to be the second 16-seed to defeat a 1-seed in the NCAA tournament. He was also the head coach of the Iona Gaels men's basketball team from 2023 to 2025.

== Early life ==
Anderson grew up in Truro, Iowa and played high school basketball at Interstate 35 High School, where he was an all-star in 1990. His father, Steve, was the head coach at Interstate 35 High School for almost three decades and later coached at Douglas High School in Box Elder, South Dakota. Anderson played college basketball at Wesleyan University from 1991 to 1995, where, as of 2022, he ranks 11th all-time in career scoring. Anderson then earned a master's degree in athletic administration from Florida State University, graduating in 1996.

== Coaching career ==
=== Clarkson (1996–2004) ===
Anderson's coaching career began at Clarkson in 1996 as an assistant coach. After one season, he joined Dave Paulsen's coaching staff at Le Moyne for two seasons before returning to Clarkson as head coach. In five seasons with Clarkson, Anderson posted a 67–66 overall record before taking the head coaching position at Hamilton College.

=== Hamilton (2004–2011) ===
While at Hamilton, Anderson compiled a 118–63 record over seven seasons, which included three UCAA regular season titles and a bid to the 2006 NCAA Division III tournament. After the 2011 season, Anderson joined the coaching staff of Siena under Mitch Buonaguro, where he stayed for two seasons before accepting the head coaching position at St. Thomas Aquinas.

=== St. Thomas Aquinas (2013–2022) ===
While with the Spartans, Anderson put together a 209–62 overall record, including five East Coast Conference regular season titles and six ECC tournament titles, reaching the NCAA Division II tournament in seven-straight seasons, including the Elite Eight in 2017. Under Anderson, St. Thomas Aquinas also defeated Division I St. John's 90–58 in an exhibition contest in 2015.

=== Fairleigh Dickinson (2022–2023) ===
On May 3, 2022, Anderson was named the eighth men's basketball coach in Fairleigh Dickinson history, replacing Greg Herenda.

In his first season as coach of the Knights, Anderson led the team to the Northeast Conference championship game, where they fell to Merrimack. However, due to NCAA division reclassification rules, Merrimack was not eligible for the NCAA tournament, which allowed FDU to receive the NEC’s automatic bid to the tournament as conference runner-up. After the Knights defeated fellow #16 seed Texas Southern in the First Four, they advanced to face #1-seeded Purdue, whom they took down 63–58, becoming only the second #16 seed to ever defeat a #1 seed in the tournament.

=== Iona (2023–2025) ===
On March 21, 2023, Anderson was named the head coach at Iona, replacing Rick Pitino who departed for the head coaching position at St. John's. Iona fired Anderson on March 17, 2025 after two seasons.

=== South Florida (2025–2026) ===
On April 29, 2025, Anderson joined the staff of Bryan Hodgson at South Florida as a Special Assistant to the Head Coach.

=== Tennessee Tech (2026–present) ===
On March 13, 2026, Anderson was named the head coach at Tennessee Tech.

== Head coaching record ==
=== NCAA DI ===
Record table
Season	Team	Overall	Conference	Standing	Postseason
Fairleigh Dickinson Knights (Northeast Conference) (2022–2023)
2022–23	Fairleigh Dickinson (Note: Fairleigh Dickinson advanced to the NCAA tournament, because NEC tournament champion Merrimack was ineligible due to their transition from Division II.)	21–16	10–6	2nd	NCAA Division I Round of 32
Fairleigh Dickinson:		21–16 (.568)	10–6 (.625)		
Iona Gaels (Metro Atlantic Athletic Conference) (2023–2025)
2023–24	Iona	16–17	10–10	7th	
2024–25	Iona	17–17	12–8	T-4th	
Iona:		33–34 (.493)	22–18 (.550)		
Tennessee Tech Golden Eagles (SoCon) (2026–present)
2026–27	Tennessee Tech	0–0	0–0		
Tennessee Tech:		0–0 (–)	0–0 (–)		
Total:		54–50 (.519)			
National champion Postseason invitational champion Conference regular season champion Conference regular season and conference tournament champion Division regular season champion Division regular season and conference tournament champion Conference tournament champion

=== NCAA DII ===
Record table
Season	Team	Overall	Conference	Standing	Postseason
St. Thomas Aquinas Spartans (East Coast Conference) (2013–2022)
2013–14	St. Thomas Aquinas	15–14	9–11	5th	
2014–15	St. Thomas Aquinas	21–11	17–3	T–1st	
2015–16	St. Thomas Aquinas	27–5	18–2	1st	NCAA Division II Second Round
2016–17	St. Thomas Aquinas	28–6	15–3	1st	NCAA Division II Elite Eight
2017–18	St. Thomas Aquinas	26–7	15–3	2nd	NCAA Division II First Round
2018–19	St. Thomas Aquinas	25–7	15–3	2nd	NCAA Division II Sweet 16
2019–20	St. Thomas Aquinas	25–5	13–3	2nd	NCAA Division II Canceled
2020–21	St. Thomas Aquinas	14–2	9–1	1st	NCAA Division II Sweet 16
2021–22	St. Thomas Aquinas	28–5	17–1	1st	NCAA Division II Sweet 16
St. Thomas Aquinas:		209–62 (.771)	128–30 (.810)		
Total:		209–62 (.771)			
National champion Postseason invitational champion Conference regular season champion Conference regular season and conference tournament champion Division regular season champion Division regular season and conference tournament champion Conference tournament champion

=== NCAA DIII ===
Record table
Season	Team	Overall	Conference	Standing	Postseason
Clarkson Golden Knights (Liberty League) (1999–2004)
1999–00	Clarkson	14–12	6–6	N/A	
2000–01	Clarkson	7–18	3–11	N/A	
2001–02	Clarkson	19–10	9–5	N/A	
2002–03	Clarkson	11–14	6–8	N/A	
2003–04	Clarkson	16–12	9–5	N/A	
Clarkson:		66–67 (.496)	33–35 (.485)		
Hamilton College (Liberty League) (2004–2011)
2004–05	Hamilton	15–11	N/A	N/A	
2005–06	Hamilton	23–5	12–2	1st	NCAA Division III Second Round
2006–07	Hamilton	19–7	11–3	1st	
2007–08	Hamilton	17–9	N/A	N/A	
2008–09	Hamilton	18–7	12–2	T–1st	
2009–10	Hamilton	10–14	N/A	N/A	
2010–11	Hamilton	16–10	N/A	N/A	
Hamilton:		118–63 (.652)	0–0 (–)		
Total:		184–130 (.586)			
National champion Postseason invitational champion Conference regular season champion Conference regular season and conference tournament champion Division regular season champion Division regular season and conference tournament champion Conference tournament champion
