= 2018 UMBC vs. Virginia men's basketball game =

Upset during NCAA March Madness in 2018

2018 NCAA tournament South Regional first round
NCAA tournament game
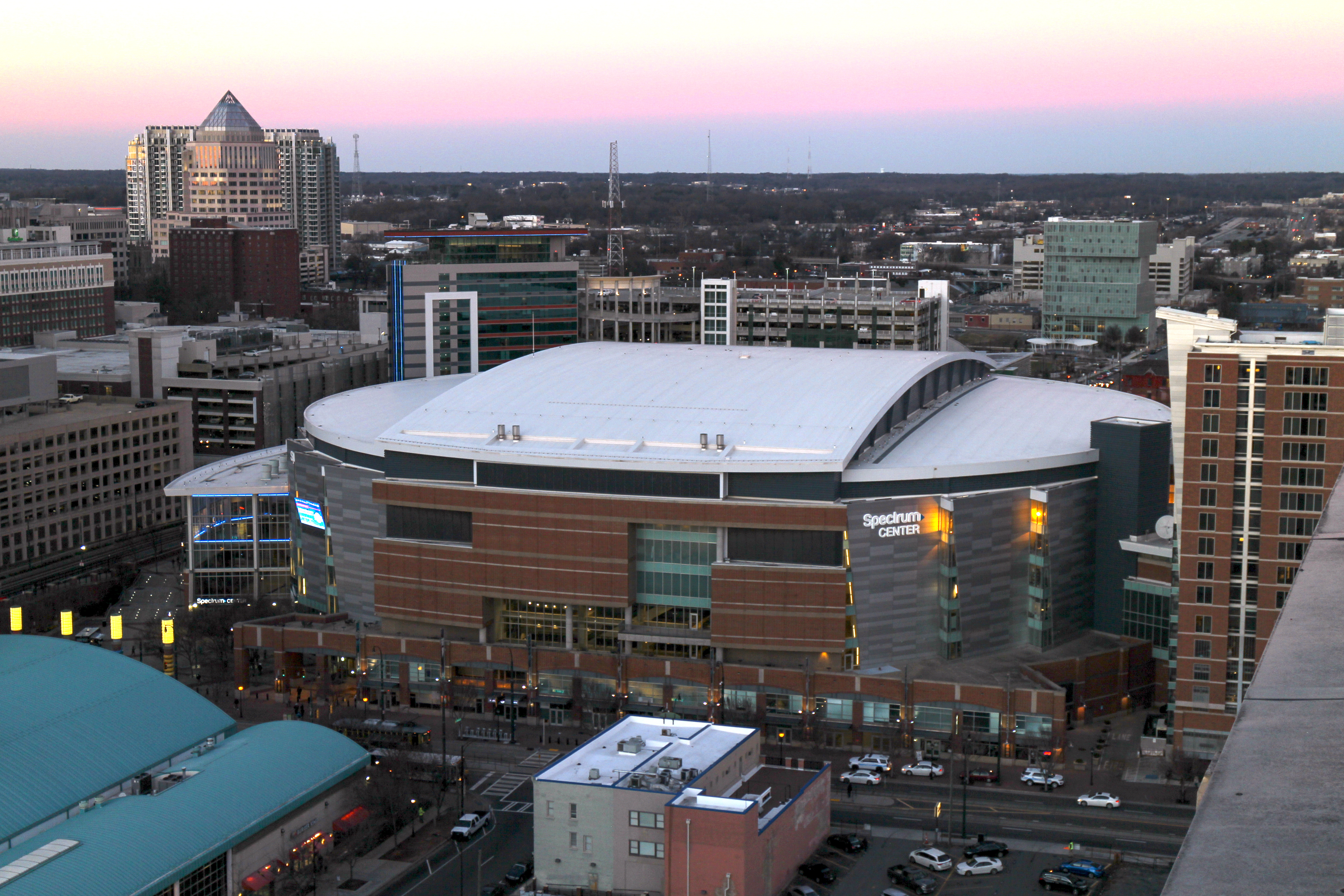
- Spectrum Center, site of the game
UMBC Retrievers	Virginia Cavaliers
AmEast	ACC
(24–10)	(31–2)
74	54
Head coach: Ryan Odom	Head coach: Tony Bennett
- AP: NR
- Coaches: NR
- AP: 1
- Coaches: 1
	1st half	2nd half	Total
UMBC Retrievers	21	53	74
Virginia Cavaliers	21	33	54
- Date: March 16, 2018
- Venue: Spectrum Center, Charlotte, North Carolina
- Favorite: Virginia by 20 1/2
- Referees: Tim Nestor, Tony Greene and Todd Austin
- Attendance: 17,943

United States TV coverage
- Network: TNT
- Announcers: Jim Nantz, Bill Raftery, Grant Hill and Tracy Wolfson
- Nielsen Ratings: 2.0 (national); U.S. viewership: 3.533 million

On March 16, 2018, during the first round of the 2018 NCAA Division I men's basketball tournament, the University of Virginia (Virginia; also UVA) Cavaliers played a college basketball game against the University of Maryland, Baltimore County (UMBC) Retrievers at the Spectrum Center in Charlotte, North Carolina. The Cavaliers, who were seeded first in the South regional bracket and first overall in the NCAA tournament, faced the Retrievers, who were seeded 16th in the south regional bracket. Virginia and UMBC competed for the right to face ninth-seeded Kansas State, which had already won their first-round game against Creighton earlier in the day.

After a close first half that saw the teams finish tied 21–21, UMBC took over in the second half and defeated the Cavaliers 74–54, becoming the first No. 16 seed to defeat a No. 1 seed in the NCAA Division I men's basketball tournament. It was only the second time in college basketball overall, after No. 16 seeded Harvard defeated overall No. 1 Stanford in the women's tournament twenty years earlier. UMBC also earned its first NCAA tournament win in school history. With Virginia set as a 20 1/2-point favorite heading into the game, UMBC's victory stands as the third-biggest upset in terms of point spread in NCAA tournament history behind Norfolk State's defeat of Missouri in 2012 when Missouri was a 21 1/2-point favorite, and Fairleigh Dickinson's defeat of Purdue in 2023 when Purdue was a 23 1/2-point favorite. Virginia finished their season at 31–3 while UMBC improved to 25–10.

UMBC coach Ryan Odom, the son of former Virginia assistant coach Dave Odom, grew up as a UVA ball boy, and recalled the experience of being in attendance when the Cavaliers advanced to the Final Four in 1984. After Virginia coach Tony Bennett retired from coaching in 2024, Odom was ultimately named as his successor.

== Background ==
At the start of this game, NCAA tournament No. 16 seeds were 0–135 all-time against No. 1 seeds since the tournament field expanded to 64 teams in 1985. Although there had been close games, such as the 1989 Georgetown vs. Princeton game, a No. 16 seed had never managed to hold a lead through the end of a game.

=== UMBC ===
UMBC entered its 2017–18 season under second-year head coach Ryan Odom. A preseason America East Conference coaches' poll picked the Retrievers to finish third in their league, and incoming senior guard Jairus Lyles earned Preseason All-Conference honors. The team completed the regular season with a 24–10 record and a second-place finish in the America East. Lyles, who averaged a team-high 20.3 points per game, and another senior guard, K. J. Maura, were named first-team and third-team all-conference, respectively, with the latter earning America East defensive player of the year accolades.

On March 10, 2018, UMBC won the 2018 America East tournament after Lyles made a three-pointer with 0.6 seconds left to defeat top-seeded Vermont in the championship game. The win handed the Retrievers an automatic NCAA tournament berth, their second appearance ever and their first since 2008, when they suffered a 66–47 loss to Georgetown in their opening game. It also gave UMBC its 24th win of the season, tied for most in program history. Before the team's NCAA tournament opener against Virginia, guard-forward Joe Sherburne said, "We know we can go out there and have fun and play hard, and we really don't have anything to lose, so it'll be we go out there and play loose." Five years later, Fairleigh Dickinson would become the second 16 seed to upset a number 1 seed as they would upset top seed Purdue 63–58 in the 2023 NCAA tournament.

=== Virginia ===
In a rebuilding year under head coach Tony Bennett, Virginia had entered the season unranked but proceeded to win the Atlantic Coast Conference (ACC) regular season championship outright by four games over pre-season AP No. 1 Duke, finishing 17–1 in conference play including Bennett's first win at Cameron Indoor Stadium. They then capped an improbable ascendancy by defeating North Carolina in the ACC tournament championship, finishing the regular season 31–2. Virginia entered the tournament seeded first overall.

Two days before the UMBC game, the Cavaliers lost their future NBA lottery pick, forward De'Andre Hunter, to a season-ending left wrist fracture. The injury led the New York Daily News to change their pick from Virginia winning the national championship to not advancing out of the Sweet Sixteen.

== Venue ==
The game was played at the Spectrum Center in Charlotte, North Carolina. The attendance for the game was 17,943. Spectrum Center had previously hosted the tournament in 2008, 2011 and 2015.

== Broadcast ==
The game was televised nationally as part of NCAA March Madness on TNT and announced by Charlotte native Jim Nantz, Bill Raftery and Grant Hill, with Tracy Wolfson as their sideline reporter. The game was played after the conclusion of the Kansas State–Creighton game, which took place in the same venue. The game had 3.53 million viewers, with a 94% and 54% increase in viewership compared to the 2016 and 2017 games in the same slot.

== Game summary ==
External videos
- Video highlights on YouTube
- Full game broadcast by TNT on YouTube

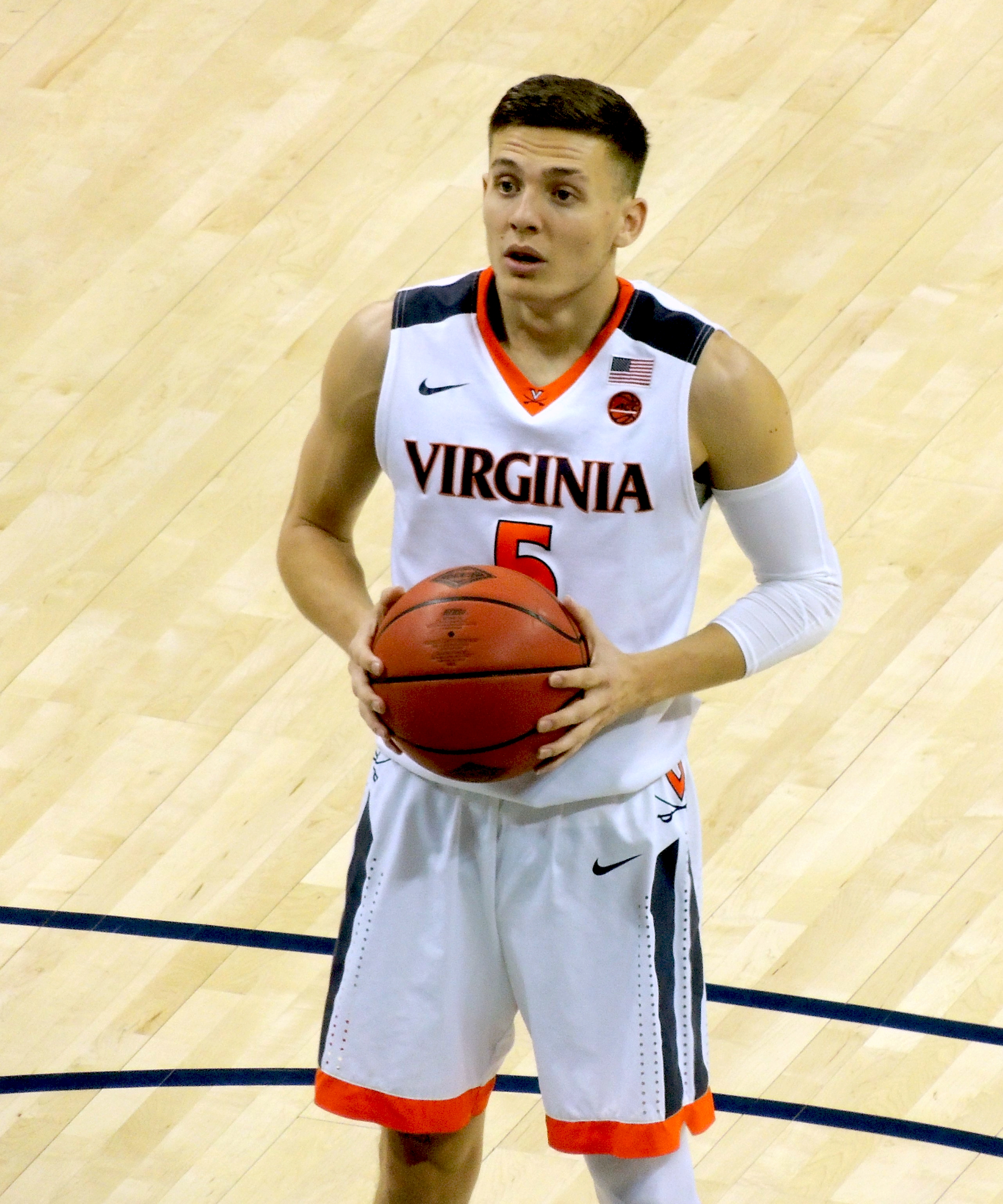
Kyle Guy (pictured) scored 15 points for Virginia, tied for most on his team.

The game started defensively with the first half having four separate ties. UMBC did not lead until just before the midpoint of the half, before a Virginia steal tied the game up for the second time. Virginia went on a 7–1 run over a four-minute period to hold a six-point lead late in the first half before UMBC managed to tie the game at 16–16 before the final TV timeout of the half. UMBC took the lead twice before halftime, but Virginia was able to tie the game up at both points.

Coming out of halftime, the Retrievers went on an early 7–2 run before Virginia used their first of three remaining timeouts of the game. Despite the timeout, a 6–2 run before the first TV timeout of the half gave the Retrievers an 11-point lead. Another UMBC run of 10–4 would force the Cavaliers to use a second timeout. An 11–7 run by Virginia allowed them to get within 12 points before UMBC was forced to use their timeout. Both teams would stall as only eight combined points were scored by both teams before the Retrievers' second timeout. A 5–0 run by UMBC within a minute forced Virginia to use their final timeout. Despite the break, fouls by Virginia contributed to UMBC making four free throws and scoring a layup on a missed free throw, which allowed the lead to be extended to 19 points. The final two minutes would see the Retrievers extend their lead by another point to finish the game 74–54. Jim Nantz, who was calling the game for CBS, said to the viewers after the final buzzer sounded, “Shock and awe in college basketball. UMBC makes history in Charlotte!”

The Cavaliers, who led the NCAA during the season in scoring defense at 53.4 points per game, were outscored by the Retrievers 53–33 in the final twenty minutes. The 20-point loss was the largest deficit the Cavaliers suffered their entire season. It was also the only time they allowed as many as 70 points that season. UMBC's Jairus Lyles, who scored 28 points while battling through cramps late in the second half, was named the game's most valuable player.

== Box score ==
TNT

Friday, March 16
9:45 p.m. EDT

No. 16 UMBC Retrievers 74, No. 1 Virginia Cavaliers 54
Scoring by half: 21–21, 53–33
Pts: J. Lyles – 28; Rebs: A. Lamar – 10; Asts: A. Lamar, J. Lyles, K. Maura – 3	Pts: K. Guy, T. Jerome – 15; Rebs: I. Wilkins – 5 Asts: T. Jerome – 2

Spectrum Center – Charlotte, NC
Attendance: 17,943
Referees: Tim Nestor, Tony Greene, and Todd Austin

Legend
No.	Jersey number	Pos	Position	Min	Minutes played	FGM	Field goals made
FGA	Field goals attempted	3PM	Three-point field goals made	3PA	Three-point field goals attempted	FTM	Free throws made
FTA	Free throws attempted	OReb	Offensive rebounds	Reb	Rebounds	Ast	Assists
Stl	Steals	Blk	Blocks	TO	Turnovers	PF	Personal fouls
Pts	Points

UMBC Retrievers
No.	Player	Pos	Min	FGM	FGA	3PM	3PA	FTM	FTA	OReb	Reb	Ast	Stl	Blk	TO	PF	Pts
30	Daniel Akin	F	22	1	3	0	0	0	0	1	1	1	0	0	1	2	2
23	Max Curran	F	10	0	2	0	1	0	0	1	2	2	0	0	0	0	0
35	Nolan Gerrity	F/C	2	0	0	0	0	0	0	0	1	0	0	0	0	0	0
11	K. J. Maura	G	40	3	6	2	3	2	2	0	3	3	2	0	2	2	10
13	Joe Sherburne	G	29	5	11	3	8	1	1	0	6	2	0	0	0	3	14
5	Jourdan Grant	G	27	3	6	2	4	0	0	0	4	2	0	0	1	1	8
10	Jairus Lyles	G	39	9	11	3	4	7	9	0	4	3	0	0	4	2	28
33	Arkel Lamar	G/F	31	5	9	2	4	0	2	1	10	3	0	0	2	3	12
Team totals				26	48	12	24	10	14	3	31	16	2	0	10	13	74

Virginia Cavaliers
No.	Player	Pos	Min	FGM	FGA	3PM	3PA	FTM	FTA	OReb	Reb	Ast	Stl	Blk	TO	PF	Pts
33	Jack Salt	C	21	0	1	0	0	0	2	0	4	0	0	0	0	0	0
21	Isaiah Wilkins	F	24	3	7	1	2	0	0	4	5	1	1	0	0	5	7
25	Mamadi Diakite	F	24	2	2	0	0	2	3	0	3	0	0	1	2	2	6
23	Nigel Johnson	G	24	4	10	1	3	0	0	0	1	0	1	0	0	0	9
11	Ty Jerome	G	39	6	16	2	9	1	1	0	3	2	4	0	3	4	15
0	Devon Hall	G	28	1	9	0	6	0	0	0	1	1	0	0	0	3	2
5	Kyle Guy	G	40	7	11	0	2	1	2	1	4	1	2	0	2	2	15
Team totals				23	56	4	22	4	8	5	21	5	8	1	7	16	54

== Aftermath and redemption ==
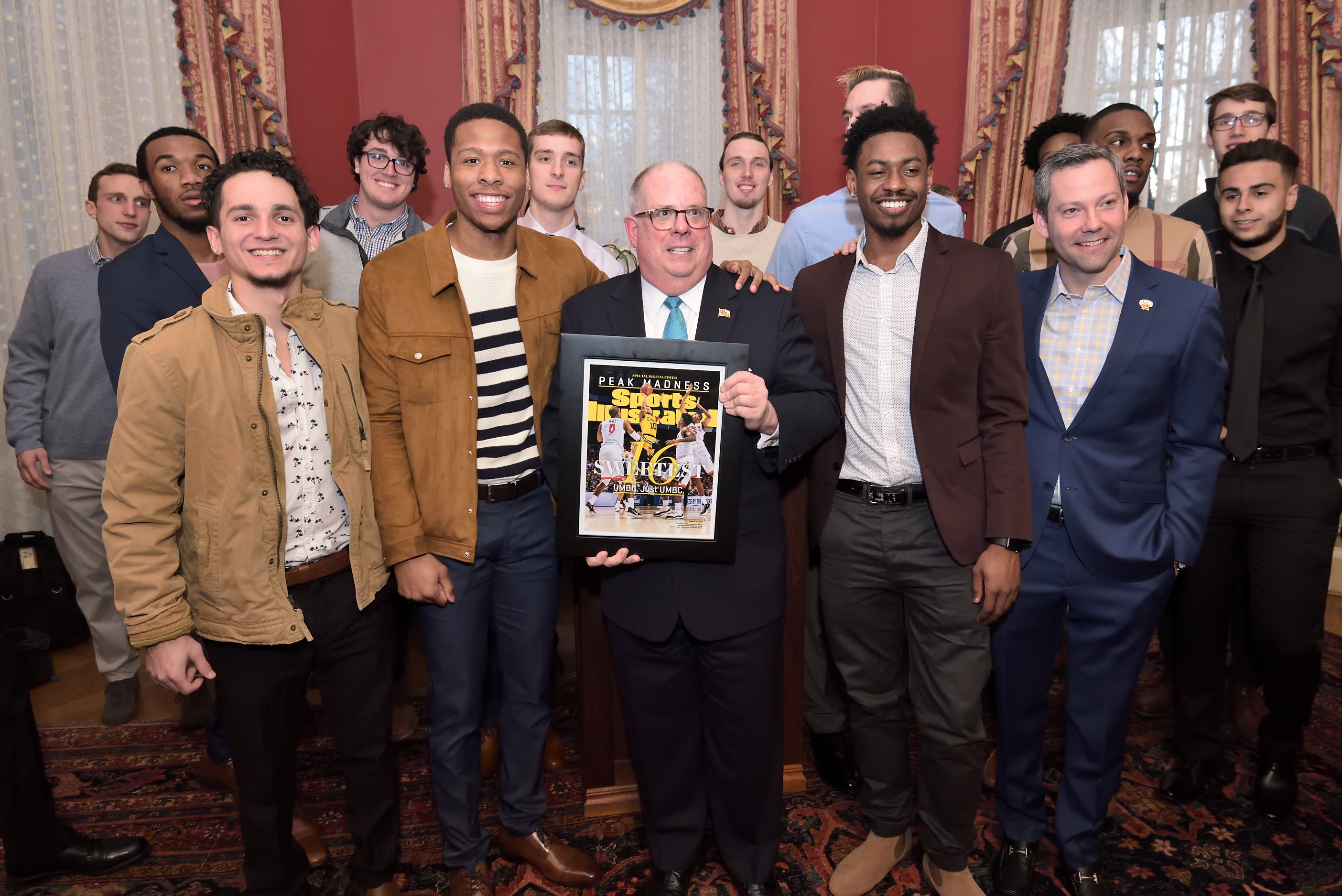
The UMBC basketball team with Larry Hogan, who is holding a special digital cover of Sports Illustrated published after the game

Immediately after the game in an interview, Virginia coach Tony Bennett remarked,

"That was not even close. That's first a credit to the job Ryan did, coach Odom. Their offense was very hard to guard. They shot it well. We kept getting broken down and did a poor job. ... We had a hard time with their mobile fours and their four guards. I don't know what to say but that. That was a thorough butt whipping."

Bennett continued to say,

"This is life. It can't define you. You enjoyed the good times and you gotta be able to take the bad times. When you step into the arena... the consequences can be historic losses, tough losses, great wins, and you have to deal with it. And that's the job."

This reaction by Bennett after the game was featured in Inc. magazine as a lesson in emotional intelligence and leadership. After the win, Odom said, "Unbelievable—it's really all you can say."

UMBC advanced to the round of 32, in which they faced the 9 seed Kansas State Wildcats on March 18, 2018. The game was competitive, with neither team having a lead greater than nine points throughout the game, and UMBC trailing by only three points with two minutes remaining in the game. The Wildcats won the game 50–43, thus ending UMBC's one-game Cinderella run.

The first round losses by No. 1 seed Virginia and No. 4 seed Arizona, and second round losses by No. 2 seed Cincinnati and No. 3 seed Tennessee, led to the south region becoming the first ever to not advance any of its top four seeds to the Sweet Sixteen. Another Cinderella, No. 11 seed Loyola Chicago, won the region by beating Kansas State 78–62, becoming the fourth 11 seed ever to advance to the Final Four.

Following the season, two members of the Retrievers staff became head coaches. Assistant coach Eric Skeeters took over the Delaware State program, while director of recruiting Griff Aldrich took over Longwood. Delaware State and Longwood met in the 2018–19 season, with the host team Longwood winning 89–73. Aldrich then led Longwood to their first ever Division I postseason appearance in the 2019 College Basketball Invitational, and was named a finalist for the Joe B. Hall Award (given for most outstanding first-year head coach), which had been won by Odom in 2017. A member of the Virginia coaching staff, Ron Sanchez, also left to become a new head coach as he took over the Charlotte 49ers in the same city the UMBC game was played in.

In 2018–19, Virginia again led the Atlantic Coast Conference standings and attained another No. 1 seed. Virginia trailed by as many as 14 points to No. 16 seed Gardner–Webb in the first half and still trailed by 6 (36–30) at halftime, before the Cavaliers poured it on and outscored the Runnin' Bulldogs 41–14 in the first nineteen minutes of the second half. Virginia went on to win the 2019 NCAA tournament championship in dramatic fashion, becoming the first first-time winner of the national championship since Florida thirteen years prior. UMBC, meanwhile, lost to Vermont in the championship game of the America East conference tournament, ending their hopes for an immediate return to the tourney. In a show of sportsmanship, the official UMBC athletics Twitter account celebrated Virginia's dramatic victory over Purdue in the Elite Eight. ESPN called Virginia's 2018–19 championship run "the most redemptive season in the history of college basketball." NBC Sports called Virginia's 2018–19 NCAA title the "greatest redemption story in the history of sports". Following the championship game, veteran CBS Sports announcer Jim Nantz (who also called Virginia's upset loss to UMBC in the previous year's first-round tournament game), called Virginia's win the "all-time turnaround title". De'Andre Hunter (who missed the UMBC game with the broken wrist) was drafted number 4 as a lottery pick in the 2019 NBA draft, as Ty Jerome and Kyle Guy also left early and were drafted as well.

Five years later, in the 2023 NCAA Division I men's basketball tournament, a similar upset would take place between No. 1 Purdue and No. 16 seed Fairleigh Dickinson. FDU won 63–58, joining the Retrievers in being the only No. 16 seeds to advance to the Round of 32. Coincidentally, similar to the Cavaliers years prior, the Boilermakers would have their own shot at redemption a year after their upsetting defeat, with Purdue not only regaining the No. 1 seed the following season for the 2024 NCAA tournament, but also going as far as the championship match themselves. However, unlike with Virginia's shot at redemption, Purdue would fail to fully clinch their chance that season, losing 75–60 to defending champion, UConn.

Seven years after the upset, Ryan Odom was named Virginia's head coach following Tony Bennett's retirement shortly before the 2024–25 season.

== See also ==
- 1998 Harvard vs. Stanford women's basketball game, in which the 16 seed Harvard team beat 1 seed Stanford
- 1989 Georgetown vs. Princeton men's basketball game, in which 16 seed Princeton nearly beat 1 seed Georgetown
- 2023 Fairleigh Dickinson vs. Purdue men's basketball game, in which 16 seed Fairleigh Dickinson beat 1 seed Purdue
