= UMBC Retrievers men's basketball =

Men's basketball team that represents the University of Maryland, Baltimore County

2026–27 UMBC Retrievers men's basketball team
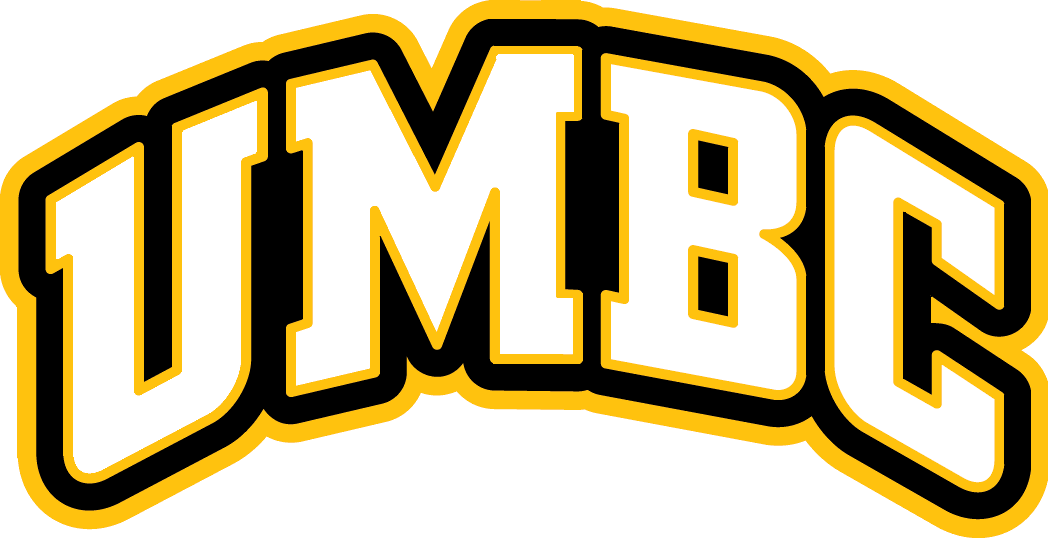
- University: University of Maryland, Baltimore County
- First season: 1967–68; 59 years ago
- Head coach: Jim Ferry (6th season)
- Location: Catonsville, Maryland
- Arena: Chesapeake Employers Insurance Arena (capacity: 5,000)
- Conference: America East
- Nickname: Retrievers
- Colors: Black and gold
- Student section: Hilltop Hysteria
- All-time record: 671–943 (.416)

NCAA Division I tournament Elite Eight
- 1979*

NCAA Division I tournament Sweet Sixteen
- 1979*, 1980*

NCAA Division I tournament appearances
- 1979*, 1980*, 2008, 2018, 2026

Conference tournament champions
- America East: 2008, 2018, 2026

Conference regular-season champions
- Northeast Conference; 1999 America East Conference; 2008, 2021, 2026

Uniforms
Home	Away	Alternate
- * at Division II level

The UMBC Retrievers men's basketball team represents the University of Maryland, Baltimore County in National Collegiate Athletic Association (NCAA) Division I competition as a member of the America East Conference. They play their home games at Chesapeake Employers Insurance Arena in Catonsville, Maryland. Their current head coach is Jim Ferry.

UMBC made its first Division I postseason appearance in the NCAA tournament in 2008, for which it qualified by winning the America East tournament. The Retrievers have appeared three times in the NCAA tournament, most recently in 2026.

The Retrievers are best known for when they qualified for their second NCAA tournament appearance in 2018 by beating the Vermont Catamounts in the America East tournament final and became the first No. 16 seed to defeat a No. 1 seed in the NCAA men's tournament, beating No. 1-seeded Virginia 74–54. The win has been dubbed the greatest upset in college basketball history.

== History ==
The UMBC men's basketball program began play for the 1967–68 season, finishing with a 4–7 record under head coach Joe Phillip. The Retrievers joined NCAA Division I for the 1986–87 season, competing as an independent. In 1990, UMBC joined the East Coast Conference, later joining the Big South Conference in 1992, Northeast Conference in 1998, and America East Conference in 2003.

Under the leadership of head coach Randy Monroe, the Retrievers went 24–9 and made their first NCAA tournament appearance in 2008, defeating Hartford in the America East championship. At the 2008 NCAA Division I men's basketball tournament, UMBC lost to Georgetown 66–47 in the first round.

In 2018, UMBC returned to the NCAA tournament under head coach Ryan Odom after defeating Vermont 65–62 in the America East championship. In the 2018 NCAA Division I men's basketball tournament, the Retrievers achieved a historic upset win over No. 1 seeded Virginia 74–54. With the win, UMBC became the first No. 16 seed to ever defeat a No. 1 seed in the NCAA tournament. In the second round they would lose to No. 9 seeded Kansas State 50–43.

In 2026, after an eight-year absence, the Retrievers returned to the 2026 NCAA Division I men's basketball tournament led by Jim Ferry after earning a 24–8 record and defeating Vermont 74–59 in the America East championship game. UMBC's DJ Armstrong scored 33 points including seven three-pointers to lead the Retrievers back to the NCAA tournament. They would lose to No. 16 seeded Howard in the First Four 86–83.

== Postseason ==
=== NCAA Division I Tournament results ===
The Retrievers have appeared in the NCAA Division I tournament three times. Their combined record is 1–3.

Year	Seed	Round	Opponent	Result
2008	#15	First Round	#2 Georgetown	L 47–66
2018	#16	First Round; Second Round	#1 Virginia #9 Kansas State	W 74–54; L 43–50
2026	#16	First Four	#16 Howard	L 83–86

=== The Basketball Classic results ===
The Retrievers have appeared in The Basketball Classic one time. Their record is 0–1.

Year	Round	Opponent	Result
2022	First round	Merrimack	L 0–2*

* UMBC withdrew from the tournament citing health concerns and not enough players. As a result, Merrimack was granted a 2–0 win.

=== NCAA Division II Tournament results ===
The Retrievers have appeared in the NCAA Division II tournament two times. Their combined record is 3–2.

Year	Round	Opponent	Result
1979	Regional semifinals Regional Finals; Elite Eight	Mount St. Mary's; Virginia Union; Cheyney	W 79–74; W 58–56; L 62–65
1980	Regional semifinals Regional Finals	Benedict; Virginia Union	W 86–69; L 65–80
