= Elijah Olaniyi =

American basketball player (1999–2025)

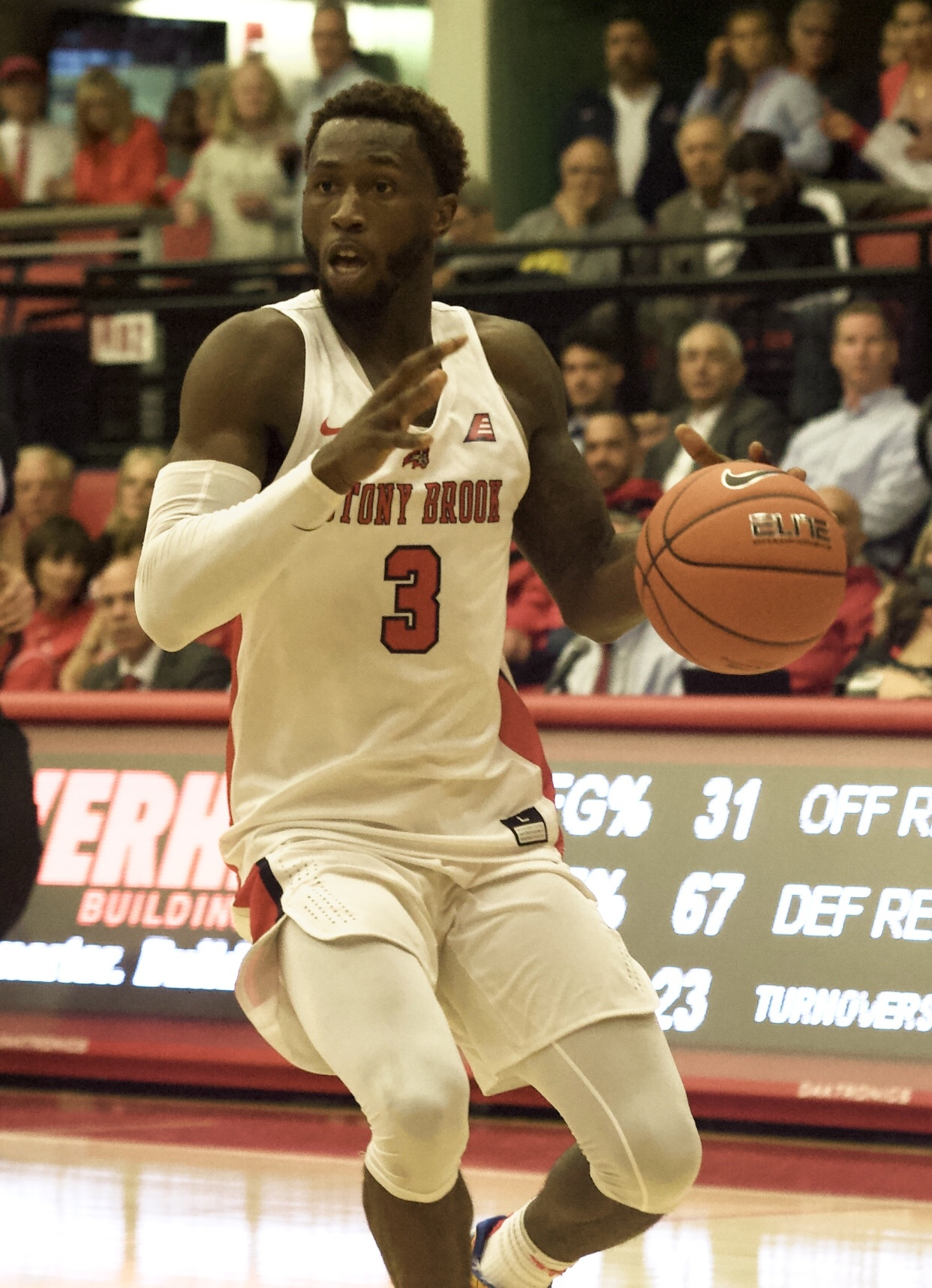
- Olaniyi with Stony Brook in 2019

Personal information
- Born: January 11, 1999 New York City, U.S.
- Died: February 27, 2025 (aged 26) Belleville, New Jersey, U.S.
- Listed height: 6 ft 5 in (1.96 m)
- Listed weight: 205 lb (93 kg)

Career information
- High school: East Side (Newark, New Jersey)
- College: Stony Brook (2017–2020); Miami (Florida) (2020–2021); Stony Brook (2021–2022)
- Playing career: 2022–2023
- Position: Shooting guard / small forward
- Number: 3, 4

Career history
- 2022: Sparta Bertrange
- 2023: Saint-Chamond

Career highlights
- First-team All-America East (2020); Third-team All-America East (2019); America East Rookie of the Year (2018); America East All-Rookie Team (2018)

Elijah Olaniyi (January 11, 1999 – February 27, 2025) was an American basketball player who played for the Stony Brook Seawolves of the America East Conference and the Miami Hurricanes of the Atlantic Coast Conference.

Olaniyi began his career at Stony Brook, winning America East Rookie of the Year in 2018 and being named first-team All-Conference in 2020 before transferring to Miami. He transferred back to Stony Brook for his fifth and final year, but left the team before the end of the season. Olaniyi retired in 2023, after being diagnosed with brain cancer. He died of cancer in February 2025.

== Early life and high school career ==
Olaniyi was born in Brooklyn, New York. He attended a charter school, which did not have a basketball team, as a high school freshman before transferring to East Side in Newark, New Jersey, the following semester. Olaniyi did not begin playing basketball until eighth grade when a gym teacher pointed him towards the direction of AAU basketball. He played two years in AAU with the NJ Roadrunners. At East Side, he played for head coach Anthony Tavares. With Olaniyi, the East Side Red Raiders won county championships in 2014 and 2017, as well as a state title in 2015. In 87 high school games, Olaniyi recorded 928 points and 588 rebounds. In his junior season, he was named to the All-Group 4 First Team. He was named first-team All-State and All-Conference as a senior.

Olaniyi was listed as a two-star recruit by ESPN as a small forward, with a 67 overall grade. ESPN ranked Olaniyi as the 11th-best recruit in the state of New Jersey and the 75th-best small forward.

== College career ==
Olaniyi made his college debut on November 10, 2017, against Maryland, where he played 20 minutes and scored three points. On November 19, Olaniyi came off the bench and led Stony Brook with 16 points against No. 2 Michigan State. The game started a series of five double-digit games in a row off the bench for Olaniyi. In his first career start, he had a double-double with 10 points and 10 rebounds against Hartford. He won the 2018 America East Rookie of the Year award after leading all freshmen with 7.8 points and 3.8 rebounds per game. He was named America East Rookie of the Week four times and was also named to the America East All-Rookie Team.

In his sophomore season, Olaniyi averaged 16.8 points in Stony Brook's first four games before suffering a concussion in the team's home opener against Molloy. He missed two games and came off the bench against Quinnipiac in his return. On February 2, 2019, Olaniyi scored a new career-high 28 points against Hartford. In Stony Brook's America East quarterfinal loss to Binghamton, Olaniyi led all players with 27 points. He finished his sophomore season averaging 12.3 points per game and 5.9 rebounds per game with a 42.5 percent field goal rate. He was named to the Third-Team All-America East.

Olaniyi broke out in his junior season. On December 7, 2019, he had a career game, scoring 30 points against Brown on 11-for-15 shooting. He scored his 1,000th career point in a 70–62 victory over Albany on January 18, 2020, his fourth-straight 20-point, 10-rebound double-double. On February 5, he scored a career-high 33 points against UMass Lowell. On February 8, Olaniyi suffered a high ankle sprain versus New Hampshire and missed five games, prior to the injury, he was averaging 19.7 points and 6.9 rebounds per game. He returned off the bench on March 3 against UMBC and re-entered the starting lineup in the 2020 America East tournament, scoring 11 points against Albany in the quarterfinals and 19 points against Hartford in the semifinals. Olaniyi was named to the First-Team All-America East, ending his junior season averaging 18.0 points and 6.5 rebounds per game while shooting 43.5 percent from the floor and 36.1 percent from three-point range.

On March 28, 2020, Olaniyi officially declared for the 2020 NBA draft. On May 17, he announced that he would transfer to Miami (Florida) for his senior season. He averaged 10.5 points and 5.1 rebounds per game. After the season, he entered the transfer portal. On April 2, 2021, Olaniyi announced that he would be transferring back to Stony Brook for his fifth season of eligibility.

On November 22, 2021, Olaniyi suffered a leg injury against Sacred Heart and missed 10 games. He returned on January 8, 2022, against Maine. Olaniyi took a personal leave of absence from the team on January 19, 2022, and rejoined the team on January 26. On February 10, Olaniyi announced that he had permanently left the team and withdrawn from the university, citing his injury and Stony Brook's inability to participate in the postseason as a result of the America East Conference's punishment for Stony Brook joining the Colonial Athletic Association in July. He played seven games, averaging 8.9 points and 3.7 rebounds per game.

Olaniyi ended his college career with 1,417 points – 1,197 at Stony Brook (eighth-most in program history) and 220 at Miami.

== Professional career ==
On September 24, 2022, Olaniyi made his post-collegiate debut with the semi-pro team Sparta of the Luxembourgish Basketball League, recording 21 points, five rebounds and six assists in a 98–69 victory over Soleuvre. On December 7, 2023, Olaniyi announced on his Instagram page that he was retiring from professional basketball due to unexpected health issues later announced as brain cancer.

== Career statistics ==
Legend
GP	Games played	GS	Games started	MPG	Minutes per game
FG%	Field goal percentage	3P%	3-point field goal percentage	FT%	Free throw percentage
RPG	Rebounds per game	APG	Assists per game	SPG	Steals per game
BPG	Blocks per game	PPG	Points per game	**Bold**	Career high

=== College ===
Year	Team	GP	GS	MPG	FG%	3P%	FT%	RPG	APG	SPG	BPG	PPG
2017–18	Stony Brook	**32**	8	22.3	**.455**	.313	.534	3.8	0.7	1.0	0.1	7.8
2018–19	Stony Brook	31	**30**	31.1	.425	.319	.705	5.9	1.7	0.8	0.4	12.3
2019–20	Stony Brook	28	26	**32.6**	.435	**.361**	**.709**	**6.5**	**2.1**	**1.6**	0.3	**18.0**
2020–21	Miami	21	18	**32.6**	.421	.263	.709	5.1	0.9	0.9	0.4	10.5
2021–22	Stony Brook	7	4	25.1	.434	.125	**.737**	3.7	0.9	1.1	**0.6**	8.9
Career		119	86	29.0	.434	.314	.684	5.2	1.3	1.1	0.3	11.9

== Personal life and death ==
Olaniyi was born to Festus and Ruth Olaniyi and had five siblings. Olaniyi was the first member of his family to be a natural born citizen of the United States after his parents immigrated from Nigeria. Olaniyi cited Kobe Bryant and Jimmy Butler as personal influences on his basketball career. In July 2017, his mother Ruth died two days after Olaniyi first moved into college.

In an interview with The Statesman, Olaniyi revealed that he was diagnosed with brain cancer originating in 2021, and underwent three surgeries in December 2023 to remove 95% of the tumor. He began radiation and chemotherapy treatments weeks later. In February 2024, Olaniyi announced that he was cancer-free, but the disease returned later that year and he was hospitalized again. Olaniyi died in Belleville, New Jersey, on February 27, 2025, at the age of 26.
