= Stony Brook Seawolves men's basketball statistical leaders =

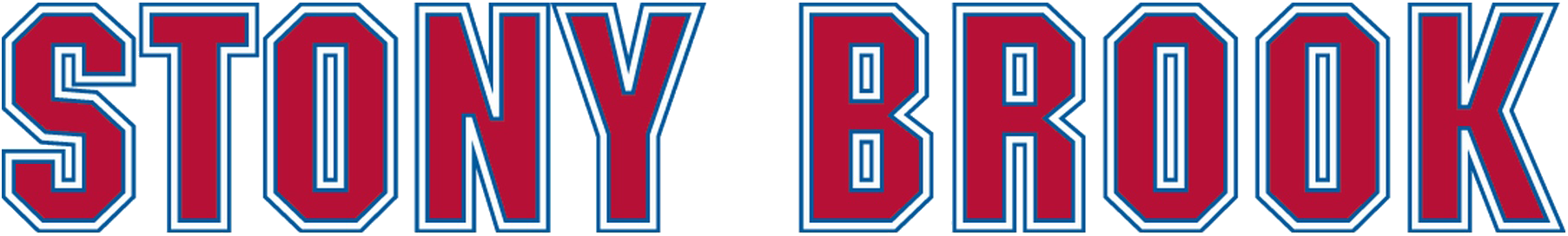
Stony Brook Seawolves primary logo

The Stony Brook Seawolves men's basketball statistical leaders are individual statistical leaders of the Stony Brook Seawolves men's basketball program in various categories, including points, assists, blocks, rebounds, and steals. Within those areas, the lists identify single-game, single-season, and career leaders. The Seawolves represent Stony Brook University in the NCAA Division I Colonial Athletic Association.

Stony Brook played its first Division I season in 1999. These lists are updated through the end of the 2021–22 season.

== Scoring ==
Career
Rk	Player	Points	Seasons
1	Jameel Warney	2,132	2012–13 2013–14 2014–15 2015–16
2	Bryan Dougher	1,609	2008–09 2009–10 2010–11 2011–12
3	D.J. Munir	1,590	2000–01 2001–02 2002–03 2003–04
4	Carson Puriefoy	1,572	2012–13 2013–14 2014–15 2015–16
5	Mitchell Beauford	1,359	2003–04 2004–05 2005–06 2006–07 2007–08
	Tyler Stephenson-Moore	1,359	2019–20 2020–21 2021–22 2022–23 2023–24
7	Akwasi Yeboah	1,317	2016–17 2017–18 2018–19
8	Dave Coley	1,228	2010–11 2011–12 2012–13 2013–14
9	Elijah Olaniyi	1,197	2017–18 2018–19 2019–20 2021–22
10	Anthony Jackson	1,048	2010–11 2011–12 2012–13 2013–14
	Mike Popoko	1,048	2003–04 2004–05 2005–06 2006–07

Season
Rk	Player	Points	Season
1	Jameel Warney	655	2015–16
2	Erik Pratt	582	2025–26
3	Jameel Warney	575	2014–15
4	Tyler Stephenson-Moore	547	2023–24
5	CJ Luster II	539	2024–25
6	Akwasi Yeboah	534	2018–19
7	Muhammad El-Amin	517	2009–10
8	Makale Foreman	515	2019–20
9	Elijah Olaniyi	504	2019–20
	Carson Puriefoy	504	2014–15

Single game
Rk	Player	Points	Season	Opponent
1	Jameel Warney	43	2015–16	Vermont
2	Anthony Roberts	40	2021–22	Maine
3	Erik Pratt	39	2025–26	Charleston
4	Jameel Warney	36	2015–16	Hartford
	Anthony Jackson	36	2013–14	Toledo
	D.J. Munir	36	2001–02	Sacred Heart
7	D.J. Munir	35	2002–03	Boston University
	Leon Brisport	35	2000–01	Columbia\
	Andrej Shoshkikj	35	2025–26	Campbell
10	Erik Pratt	34	2025–26	Hampton
	Frankie Policelli	34	2022–23	Hampton

== Rebounds ==
Career
Rk	Player	Rebounds	Seasons
1	Jameel Warney	1,275	2012–13 2013–14 2014–15 2015–16
2	Tommy Brenton	1,115	2008–09 2009–10 2011–12 2012–13
3	Dallis Joyner	731	2008–09 2009–10 2010–11 2011–12
4	Mike Popoko	592	2003–04 2004–05 2005–06 2006–07
5	Akwasi Yeboah	566	2016–17 2017–18 2018–19
6	Tyrell Sturdivant	548	2014–15 2015–16 2016–17 2017–18
7	Frankie Policelli	532	2020–21 2021–22 2022–23
8	Rayshaun McGrew	525	2013–14 2014–15 2015–16
9	Dave Coley	518	2010–11 2011–12 2012–13 2013–14
10	Elijah Olaniyi	513	2017–18 2018–19 2019–20 2021–22

Season
Rk	Player	Rebounds	Season
1	Jameel Warney	409	2014–15
2	Jameel Warney	357	2015–16
3	Tommy Brenton	311	2009–10
4	Frankie Policelli	310	2022–23
5	Tommy Brenton	279	2012–13
6	Rayshaun McGrew	278	2014–15
7	Jameel Warney	273	2013–14
8	Tommy Brenton	266	2008–09
9	Tommy Brenton	259	2011–12
10	Andre Snoddy	256	2024–25

Single game
Rk	Player	Rebounds	Season	Opponent
1	Jameel Warney	23	2015–16	UMBC
2	Jameel Warney	21	2013–14	Detroit
3	Tommy Brenton	20	2012–13	Maine
4	Jameel Warney	19	2013–14	Florida Atlantic
	Frankie Policelli	19	2022–23	Army
6	Jameel Warney	18	2014–15	Hartford
	Jameel Warney	18	2014–15	Canisius
8	Tommy Brenton	17	2008–09	Binghamton
	Tommy Brenton	17	2008–09	Boston University
	Leon Brisport	17	2000–01	Albany

== Assists ==
Career
Rk	Player	Assists	Seasons
1	Tommy Brenton	405	2008–09 2009–10 2011–12 2012–13
2	D.J. Munir	372	2000–01 2001–02 2002–03 2003–04
3	Carson Puriefoy	346	2012–13 2013–14 2014–15 2015–16
4	Bobby Santiago	330	2002–03 2003–04 2004–05 2005–06
5	Lucas Woodhouse	271	2015–16 2016–17
6	Mitchell Beauford	257	2003–04 2004–05 2005–06 2006–07 2007–08
7	Bryan Dougher	234	2008–09 2009–10 2010–11 2011–12
8	Jameel Warney	220	2012–13 2013–14 2014–15 2015–16
9	Ahmad Walker	208	2013–14 2015–16
10	Dave Coley	198	2010–11 2011–12 2012–13 2013–14

Season
Rk	Player	Assists	Season
1	Lucas Woodhouse	158	2016–17
	Tommy Brenton	158	2012–13
3	Ahmad Walker	138	2015–16
4	D.J. Munir	119	2001–02
5	Jaron Cornish	118	2018–19
	Carson Puriefoy	118	2014–15
7	Lucas Woodhouse	113	2015–16
8	D.J. Munir	112	2000–01
9	Lucas Woodhouse	111	2015–16
10	Tommy Brenton	110	2011–12
	Erik Pratt	110	2025–26

Single game
Rk	Player	Assists	Season	Opponent
1	D.J. Munir	14	2001–02	Northeastern
2	Erik Pratt	13	2025–26	Charleston
3	Tommy Brenton	11	2012–13	Maine
4	Jaron Cornish	10	2018–19	Maine
	Cori Spencer	10	2002–03	Albany
	D.J. Munir	10	2000–01	Navy
7	Erik Pratt	9	2025–26	Northeastern
	Lucas Woodhouse	9	2016–17	Binghamton
	Lucas Woodhouse	9	2016–17	UMass Lowell
	Lucas Woodhouse	9	2016–17	New Hampshire
	Lucas Woodhouse	9	2015–16	St. Francis
	Lucas Woodhouse	9	2015–16	Vermont
	Tommy Brenton	9	2012–13	Maryland

== Steals ==
Career
Rk	Player	Steals	Seasons
1	Tommy Brenton	220	2008–09 2009–10 2011–12 2012–13
2	Mitchell Beauford	179	2003–04 2004–05 2005–06 2006–07 2007–08
3	D.J. Munir	150	2000–01 2001–02 2002–03 2003–04
4	Carson Puriefoy	144	2012–13 2013–14 2014–15 2015–16
5	Bryan Dougher	125	2008–09 2009–10 2010–11 2011–12
6	Bobby Santiago	112	2002–03 2003–04 2004–05 2005–06
7	Elijah Olaniyi	110	2017–18 2018–19 2019–20 2021–22
8	Dave Coley	108	2010–11 2011–12 2012–13 2013–14
9	Jameel Warney	104	2012–13 2013–14 2014–15 2015–16
10	Jairus McCollum	103	2000–01 2001–02 2002–03 2003–04

Season
Rk	Player	Steals	Season
1	Tommy Brenton	59	2009–10
2	Mitchell Beauford	55	2003–04
3	Tommy Brenton	54	2011–12
	Tommy Brenton	54	2012–13
5	Tommy Brenton	53	2008–09
	Andrew Garcia	53	2019–20
7	Tyrell Sturdivant	52	2017–18
8	Marques Cox	49	2008–09
9	D.J. Munir	48	2001–02
10	Andrej Shoshkikj	47	2025–26

Single game
Rk	Player	Steals	Season	Opponent
1	D.J. Munir	8	2001–02	Northeastern
2	Dean Noll	7	2023–24	Saint Josephs Long Island
3	Jahlil Jenkins	6	2021–22	Farmingdale State
	Roland Nyama	6	2014–15	Maine
	Muhammad El-Amin	6	2009–10	Holy Cross
	Mitchell Beauford	6	2003–04	Boston College
	Larry Jennings	6	2002–03	Centenary
	Larry Jennings	6	2002–03	Sacred Heart
	D.J. Munir	6	2001–02	Maine
	Pablo Porras	6	1999–00	Dowling

== Blocks ==
Career
Rk	Player	Blocks	Seasons
1	Jameel Warney	276	2012–13 2013–14 2014–15 2015–16
2	Mouhamadou Gueye	130	2019–20 2020–21
3	Jeff Otchere	127	2018–19 2019–20
4	Dallis Joyner	83	2008–09 2009–10 2010–11 2011–12
5	Eric McAlister	75	2010–11 2011–12 2012–13 2013–14
6	Keenan Fitzmorris	68	2022–23 2023–24
7	Anthony Mayo	63	2010–11 2011–12 2012–13 2013–14
	Mike Popoko	63	2003–04 2004–05 2005–06 2006–07
9	Jairus McCollum	58	2000–01 2001–02 2002–03 2003–04
10	Emanuel Neto	55	2006–07 2007–08

Season
Rk	Player	Blocks	Season
1	Jameel Warney	99	2015–16
2	Jameel Warney	87	2014–15
3	Jeff Otchere	78	2018–19
4	Mouhamadou Gueye	65	2020–21
	Mouhamadou Gueye	65	2019–20
6	Jeff Otchere	49	2019–20
7	Jameel Warney	48	2012–13
8	Jameel Warney	42	2013–14
9	Leon Brisport	41	2000–01
10	Eric McAlister	38	2013–14
	Emanuel Neto	38	2007–08

Single game
Rk	Player	Blocks	Season	Opponent
1	Jameel Warney	9	2015–16	Princeton
2	Mouhamadou Gueye	8	2020–21	UMBC
	Jameel Warney	8	2015–16	New Hampshire
	Jameel Warney	8	2014–15	Loyola Maryland
5	Jeff Otchere	7	2018–19	Binghamton
6	Mouhamadou Gueye	6	2019–20	Virginia
	Mouhamadou Gueye	6	2020–21	Point Park
	Mouhamadou Gueye	6	2020–21	UMass Lowell
9	Mouhamadou Gueye	5	2020–21	Hartford
	Mouhamadou Gueye	5	2020–21	New Hampshire
	Mouhamadou Gueye	5	2020–21	Bryant
	Mouhamadou Gueye	5	2020–21	Fairfield
	Junior Saintel	5	2017–18	Maine
	Jameel Warney	5	2014–15	Vermont
	Jameel Warney	5	2014–15	Albany
	Jameel Warney	5	2014–15	Albany
	Jameel Warney	5	2015–16	STAC
	Jameel Warney	5	2013–14	Siena
	Jon Paul Kobryn	5	2004–05	Navy
	Mike Popoko	5	2003–04	Army
	Leon Brisport	5	2000–01	Albany
	Leon Brisport	5	2000–01	New Hampshire
