= 2019–20 Binghamton Bearcats men's basketball team =

American college basketball season

2019–20 Binghamton Bearcats men's basketball
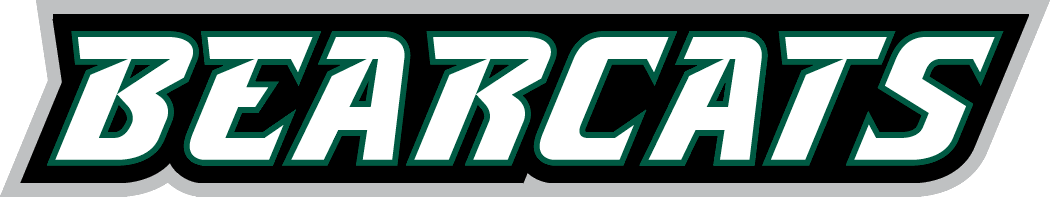
- Conference: America East Conference
- Record: 10–19 (4–12 America East)
- Head coach: Tommy Dempsey (8th season)
- Assistant coaches: Bryan Goodman; Levell Sanders; Brian Johnson
- Home arena: Binghamton University Events Center

2019–20 America East Conference men's basketball standings
	Conf.				Overall
Team	W		L	PCT	W		L	PCT
Vermont	14	–	2	.875	26	–	7	.788
Stony Brook	10	–	6	.625	20	–	13	.606
Hartford	9	–	7	.563	18	–	15	.545
UMBC	8	–	8	.500	16	–	17	.485
New Hampshire	8	–	8	.500	15	–	15	.500
UMass Lowell	7	–	9	.438	13	–	19	.406
Albany	7	–	9	.438	14	–	18	.438
Maine	5	–	11	.313	9	–	22	.290
Binghamton	4	–	12	.250	10	–	19	.345
Note: The 2020 America East tournament was cancelled prior to the championship game due to the COVID-19 pandemic.

The 2019–20 Binghamton Bearcats men's basketball team represented Binghamton University in the 2019–20 NCAA Division I men's basketball season. They played their home games at the Binghamton University Events Center in Vestal, New York and were led by eighth-year head coach Tommy Dempsey as members of the America East Conference. They finished the season 10–19, 4–12 in America East play, to finish in last place.

Prior to the season, on July 14, 2019, incoming sophomore and political science major Calistus Anyichie drowned in the upper portion of Buttermilk Falls State Park near Ithaca, New York.

== Previous season ==
The Bearcats finished the 2018–19 season 10–23 overall, 5–11 in conference play, to finish in seventh place. As the seventh seed in the 2019 America East men's basketball tournament, they upset second-seeded Stony Brook in the quarterfinals, then lost to top-seeded Vermont in the semifinals.

== Roster ==
2019–20 Binghamton Bearcats men's basketball team
Players
Coaches

Pos.	#	Name	Height	Weight	Year	Previous school	Hometown
G	0	Richard Jr. Caldwell	6 ft 4 in (1.93 m)	190 lb (86 kg)	Sr	Lamar CC	Philadelphia, PA
G	1	Hakon Hjalmarsson	6 ft 3 in (1.91 m)	175 lb (79 kg)	Fr	Menntaskolinn Vid Sunday	Reykjavík, Iceland
G	2	Brenton Mills	6 ft 3 in (1.91 m)	185 lb (84 kg)	Fr	Allen HS	Allen, TX
G	3	Sam Sessoms	6 ft 0 in (1.83 m)	188 lb (85 kg)	So	Shipley School	Philadelphia, PA
G	4	Jevon Brown	6 ft 5 in (1.96 m)	200 lb (91 kg)	Jr	Western Texas College	Toronto, ON
F	5	Pierre Sarr	6 ft 8 in (2.03 m)	215 lb (98 kg)	Sr	Monmouth	Dakar, Senegal
G	10	Leo Gallagher	5 ft 10 in (1.78 m)	150 lb (68 kg)	RS So	Seton Catholic Central HS	Binghamton, NY
G	11	Dan Petcash	6 ft 4 in (1.93 m)	190 lb (86 kg)	Fr	Pine-Richland HS	Pittsburgh, PA
G	12	Alex Brodsky	6 ft 5 in (1.96 m)	200 lb (91 kg)	Jr	Dwight-Englewood School	Woodcliff Lake, NJ
C	15	Ador Athuai	6 ft 11 in (2.11 m)	190 lb (86 kg)	Fr	The Knox School	Twic, South Sudan
F	20	George Tinsley	6 ft 6 in (1.98 m)	200 lb (91 kg)	Fr	Abington Heights HS	Clarks Summit, PA
F	21	Akuwovo Ocheneyole	6 ft 9 in (2.06 m)	230 lb (104 kg)	So	Howard	Delta State, Nigeria
G	24	Michael Besselink	6 ft 6 in (1.98 m)	185 lb (84 kg)	So	International School of Helsinki	Helsinki, Finland
C	44	Yarden Willis	7 ft 0 in (2.13 m)	230 lb (104 kg)	So	Seward County CC	Roswell, GA

Head coach

- Tommy Dempsey (Susquehanna)

Assistant coach(es)

- Bryan Goodman (Barat College)
- Levell Sanders (Seton Hall)
- Brian Johnson (Delaware)

Legend

- (C) Team captain
- (S) Suspended
- (I) Ineligible
- (W) Walk-on
- Injured
- Current redshirt

Roster
Last update: September 16, 2025

== Schedule and results ==
Date time, TV	Opponent	Result	Record	Site (attendance) city, state
Non-conference regular season
November 5, 2019*; 7:00 p.m., ESPN+	at Cornell	L 64–84	0–1	Newman Arena (1,282); Ithaca, NY
November 10, 2019*; 7:00 p.m., BTN/FSGO	at No. 1 Michigan State	L 47–100	0–2	Breslin Center (14,797); East Lansing, MI
November 13, 2019*; 7:00 p.m., ESPN+	at Columbia	L 63–75	0–3	Levien Gymnasium (801); New York, NY
November 16, 2019*; 4:00 p.m., ESPN3	Sacred Heart	W 76–72	1–3	Binghamton University Events Center (2,510); Vestal, NY
November 20, 2019*; 7:00 p.m., ESPN+	at NJIT	W 77–75	2–3	Wellness and Events Center (504); Newark, NJ
November 23, 2019*; 4:00 p.m., ESPN+	Army	W 88–73	3–3	Binghamton University Events Center (2,514); Vestal, NY
November 26, 2019*; 7:00 p.m., ESPN3	Oneonta	W 90–69	4–3	Binghamton University Events Center (1,346); Vestal, NY
December 1, 2019*; 6:00 p.m., Patriot League Network	at Loyola (MD)	L 65–77	4–4	Reitz Arena (426); Baltimore, MD
December 4, 2019*; 7:00 p.m., ESPN3	Colgate	L 74–82	4–5	Binghamton University Events Center (1,626); Vestal, NY
December 7, 2019*; 2:00 p.m., ESPN3	Boston University	W 84–79 ^{OT}	5–5	Binghamton University Events Center (2,005); Vestal, NY
December 18, 2019*; 7:45 p.m., ESPN+	at Youngstown State	L 55–73	5–6	Beeghly Center (1,988); Youngstown, OH
December 20, 2019*; 7:00 p.m., ACCN	at Pittsburgh	L 53–79	5–7	Petersen Events Center (7,226); Pittsburgh, PA
December 29, 2019*; 2:00 p.m., ESPN+	Hartwick	W 98–45	6–7	Binghamton University Events Center (2,002); Vestal, NY
America East Conference regular season
January 4, 2020; 4:00 p.m., ESPN3	Albany	L 62–74	6–8 (0–1)	Binghamton University Events Center (3,035); Vestal, NY
January 8, 2020; 7:00 p.m., ESPN+	UMBC	W 79–75	7–8 (1–1)	Binghamton University Events Center (1,413); Vestal, NY
January 11, 2020; 5:30 p.m., ESPN+	at UMass Lowell	L 66–85	7–9 (1–2)	Tsongas Center (1,420); Lowell, MA
January 15, 2020; 7:00 p.m., ESPN+	Vermont	L 53–72	7–10 (1–3)	Binghamton University Events Center (1,556); Vestal, NY
January 19, 2020; 2:00 p.m., ESPN+	at Maine	L 63–86	7–11 (1–4)	Cross Insurance Center (800); Bangor, ME
January 22, 2020; 7:00 p.m., ESPN+	at Stony Brook	W 83–79	8–11 (2–4)	Island Federal Credit Union Arena (2,261); Stony Brook, NY
January 25, 2020; 4:00 p.m., ESPN3	New Hampshire	L 69–77	8–12 (2–5)	Binghamton University Events Center (2,804); Vestal, NY
January 29, 2020; 7:00 p.m., ESPN+	at Hartford	L 57–73	8–13 (2–6)	Chase Arena at Reich Family Pavilion (630); West Hartford, CT
February 5, 2020; 7:00 p.m., ESPN+	at Albany	L 49–62	8–14 (2–7)	SEFCU Arena (1,739); Albany, NY
February 8, 2020; 2:00 p.m., ESPN+	Maine	L 75–82	8–15 (2–8)	Binghamton University Events Center (2,386); Vestal, NY
February 12, 2020; 7:00 p.m., ESPN+	Stony Brook	L 70–75	8–16 (2–9)	Binghamton University Events Center (4,238); Vestal, NY
February 15, 2020; 2:00 p.m., ESPN+	at Vermont	L 48–76	8–17 (2–10)	Patrick Gym (3,266); Burlington, VT
February 20, 2020; 7:00 p.m., ESPN+	UMass Lowell	W 86–84	9–17 (3–10)	Binghamton University Events Center (1,645); Vestal, NY
February 22, 2020; 4:00 p.m., ESPN3	Hartford	L 74–75	9–18 (3–11)	Binghamton University Events Center (2,911); Vestal, NY
February 26, 2020; 7:00 p.m., ESPN+	at UMBC	W 76–74	10–18 (4–11)	UMBC Event Center (977); Catonsville, MD
February 29, 2020; 1:00 p.m., ESPN+	at New Hampshire	L 70–89	10–19 (4–12)	Lundholm Gym (1,444); Durham, NH
*Non-conference game. ^{#}Rankings from AP poll. (#) Tournament seedings in parentheses. All times are in Eastern.
