= Mouhamadou Gueye =

American basketball player (born 1998)

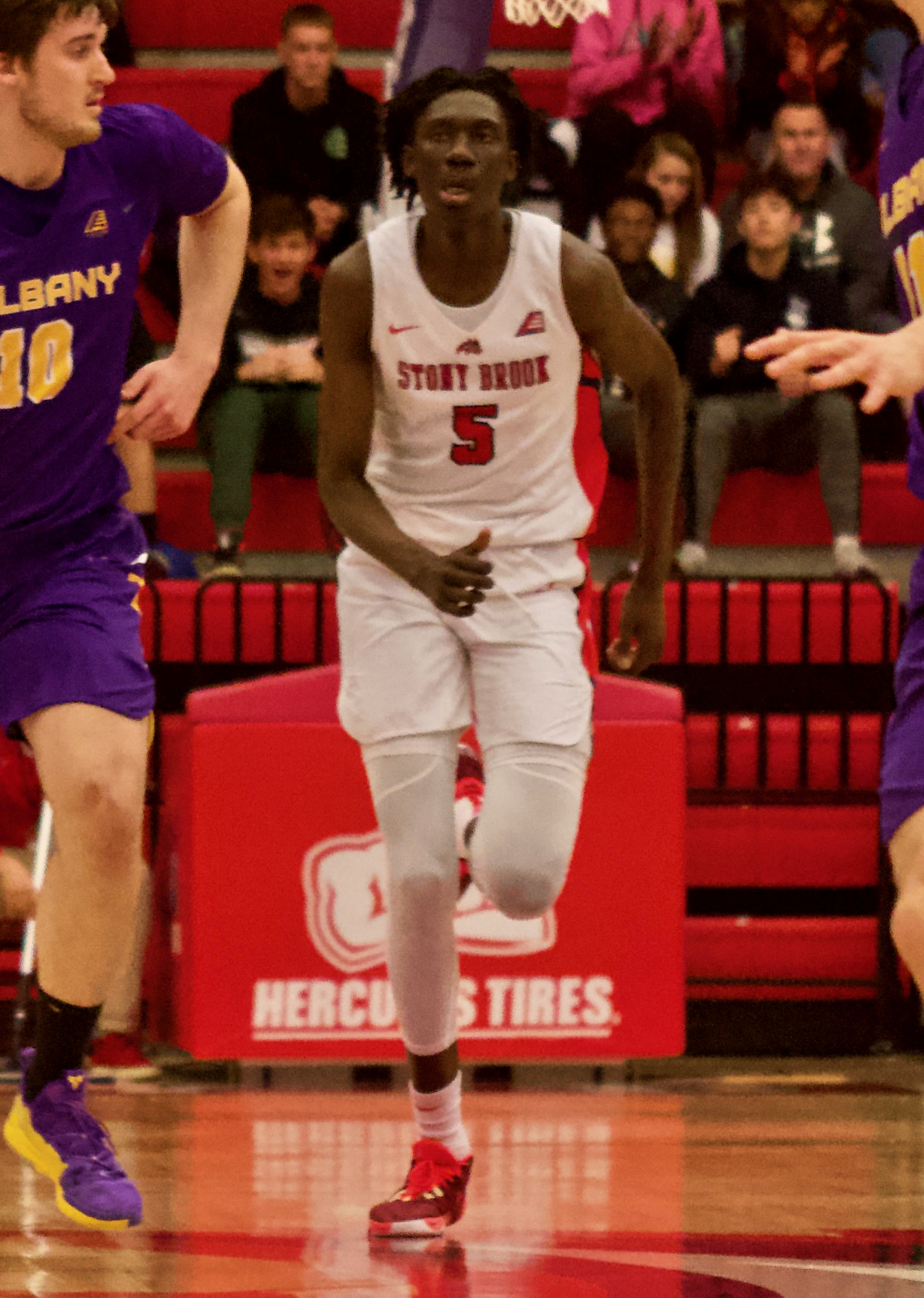
- Gueye with Stony Brook in 2020

No. 16 – Valencia Basket
- Position: Power forward
- League: Liga ACB; EuroLeague

Personal information
- Born: July 6, 1998 (age 28) Staten Island, New York, U.S.
- Listed height: 6 ft 9 in (2.06 m)
- Listed weight: 210 lb (95 kg)

Career information
- High school: Curtis (Staten Island, New York)
- College: Monroe (2016–2019); Stony Brook (2019–2021); Pittsburgh (2021–2022)
- NBA draft: 2022: undrafted
- Playing career: 2022–present

Career history
- 2022–2023: Texas Legends
- 2023–2024: Raptors 905
- 2024: Toronto Raptors
- 2024: →Raptors 905
- 2024–2025: Capital City Go-Go
- 2025–2026: Windy City Bulls
- 2026: Chicago Bulls
- 2026–present: Valencia

Career highlights
- Third-team All-America East (2021); America East Defensive Player of the Year (2021); America East All-Defensive team (2021)
- Stats at NBA.com
- Stats at Basketball Reference

Mouhamadou "Mo" Gueye (/ɡi/ GHEE; born July 6, 1998) is a Senegalese-American professional basketball player for Valencia Basket of the Liga ACB and the EuroLeague. He played college basketball for the Stony Brook Seawolves and Pittsburgh Panthers.

== Early life ==
Gueye was born in Staten Island, New York, to Senegalese parents who played basketball. His father, Ababacar, moved to Staten Island from Senegal in 1987 with $100 and saved money from a job in construction so that his wife, Souwadou, could join him a few years later. Gueye shared a passion for basketball with his father who would watch cassette tape games of their hometown New York Knicks and Ababacar's favourite player Michael Jordan. He played with friends at local parks and recreation centres in addition to his father paying for him to work with a trainer.

== High school career ==
Gueye attended Curtis High School in Staten Island and started as a 5 ft 9 in (1.75 m) guard before he grew 10 inches (25 cm) over four years. He did not play on the school's basketball team during his junior or senior seasons due to disciplinary measures arising from his truancy.

Gueye was invited to play for a local Amateur Athletic Union (AAU) team, iWork Basketball, during his senior year. A teammate uploaded a highlight reel of Gueye's play to YouTube which was noticed by an assistant coach at Monroe College. Gueye was invited for a workout on campus and was offered a spot on the roster when the coaches saw his ball-handling and passing abilities.

== College career ==
Gueye debuted at Monroe, in the NJCAA, during the 2016–17 season when he averaged 2.1 points and 3.6 rebounds per game. He sat out the 2017–18 season because of academic issues. Gueye's playing ability increased when he returned for his sophomore season in 2018–19 and attracted the interest of several colleges.

Gueye made the jump to the NCAA Division I level as he transferred to the Stony Brook Seawolves ahead of the 2019–20 season, where he learned how to play effectively within a system by knowing when to set screens, take shots and make passes. On December 8, 2019, Gueye made two plays against defending champions Virginia that both made the SportsCenter Top 10. Gueye made the SportsCenter Top 10 again after a January 8, 2020 slam dunk on Anthony Lamb of Vermont. He appeared in 33 games and made eight starts.

In his second season with the Seawolves, he was named America East Defensive Player of the Year, averaging 3.1 blocks per game. He was also named to the All-Conference Third Team. Gueye ranked in the top ten nationally in blocks, and had eight against UMBC on February 7, 2021, one shy of the program record. He had 129 blocks in two seasons at Stony Brook, the second most in the program's Division I history.

With an extra year of eligibility owing to the COVID-19 pandemic, Gueye transferred to the Pittsburgh Panthers of the Atlantic Coast Conference for his final season of college eligibility. He averaged 9.8 points, 6.3 rebounds and 1.1 assists per game during the 2021–22 season with the Panthers.

== Professional career ==
=== Texas Legends (2022–2023) ===
On September 21, 2022, Gueye signed with the Dallas Mavericks of the National Basketball Association (NBA). He was waived by the Mavericks on October 12, 2022. On October 23, 2022, Gueye was listed on the training camp roster of the Mavericks' NBA G League affiliate team, Texas Legends. On November 3, 2022, Gueye was named to the opening night roster for the Texas Legends. He averaged 8.6 points, 5.1 rebounds, 1.5 assists and 1.9 blocks per game in 29 games played.

=== Toronto Raptors / Raptors 905 (2023–2024) ===
Gueye joined the Toronto Raptors for the 2023 NBA Summer League and on July 21, 2023, the Legends traded his G League rights to the Raptors 905. On August 1, he signed a contract with the Raptors, but was waived on October 20. Ten days later, he joined the Raptors 905. On December 1, he sustained a neck injury during the game against the Maine Celtics. Gueye was the leading candidate for a two-way contract with Toronto at the time but the injury ruled him out; the team instead signed Jontay Porter.

On February 10, 2024, Gueye signed a 10-day contract with Toronto and two days later, he made his NBA debut on February 12 against the San Antonio Spurs, recording two points, three rebounds and two blocks in six minutes. On February 20, he returned to Raptors 905 and on March 4, he signed a two-way contract with Toronto. Gueye appeared in 11 games for Toronto and averaged 2.4 points and 2.1 rebounds per game.

On June 25, 2024, the Raptors waived Gueye.

=== Capital City Go-Go (2024–2025) ===
After joining the Charlotte Hornets for the 2024 NBA Summer League, Gueye signed with the Washington Wizards on October 13, 2024. However, he was waived six days later and on October 28, he joined the Capital City Go-Go.

=== Windy City / Chicago Bulls (2025–2026) ===
On September 10, 2025, Gueye signed an Exhibit 10 contract with the Chicago Bulls. He was waived prior to the start of the regular season on October 13.

Gueye played for the Windy City Bulls for the 2025–26 NBA G League season, averaging 15.9 points, 7.4 rebounds, and 2.1 assists.

On April 9, 2026, Gueye signed a contract with the Chicago Bulls for the remainder of the season. He scored 11 points in the season finale against the Dallas Mavericks.

=== Valencia Basket (2026–present) ===
On July 10, 2026, Gueye was traded to the Charlotte Hornets in a four-team trade that also involved Julius Randle being acquired by the Brooklyn Nets and Nic Claxton being acquired by the Chicago Bulls, but was waived shortly after.

On July 23, 2026, Gueye signed with Valencia Basket of the Spanish Liga ACB and the EuroLeague.

== Career statistics ==
Legend
GP	Games played	GS	Games started	MPG	Minutes per game
FG%	Field goal percentage	3P%	3-point field goal percentage	FT%	Free throw percentage
RPG	Rebounds per game	APG	Assists per game	SPG	Steals per game
BPG	Blocks per game	PPG	Points per game	**Bold**	Career high

=== NBA ===
Year	Team	GP	GS	MPG	FG%	3P%	FT%	RPG	APG	SPG	BPG	PPG
2023–24	Toronto	**11**	0	10.9	.289	.000	.444	2.1	.5	.3	**1.6**	2.4
2025–26	Chicago	2	0	**22.5**	**.545**	**.200**	**.750**	**3.0**	**3.0**	**1.0**	.5	**8.0**
Career		13	0	12.7	.347	.125	.538	2.2	.8	.4	1.5	3.2

=== College ===
Year	Team	GP	GS	MPG	FG%	3P%	FT%	RPG	APG	SPG	BPG	PPG
2019–20	Stony Brook	**33**	8	24.8	**.445**	.302	.710	6.4	1.5	0.4	2.0	7.0
2020–21	Stony Brook	21	16	26.4	.429	.345	.725	**7.1**	**2.0**	**0.8**	**3.1**	9.7
2021–22	Pittsburgh	32	**28**	**29.2**	.435	**.364**	**.770**	6.3	1.1	0.6	2.1	**9.8**
Career		86	52	26.8	.436	.347	.734	6.5	1.5	0.6	2.3	8.7
