= 2019–20 Maine Black Bears men's basketball team =

American college basketball season

2019–20 Maine Black Bears men's basketball
- Conference: America East Conference
- Record: 9–22 (5–11 America East)
- Head coach: Richard Barron (2nd season)
- Assistant coaches: Kevin Reed; Edniesha Curry; Igor Vrzina
- Home arena: Cross Insurance Center

2019–20 America East Conference men's basketball standings
	Conf.				Overall
Team	W		L	PCT	W		L	PCT
Vermont	14	–	2	.875	26	–	7	.788
Stony Brook	10	–	6	.625	20	–	13	.606
Hartford	9	–	7	.563	18	–	15	.545
UMBC	8	–	8	.500	16	–	17	.485
New Hampshire	8	–	8	.500	15	–	15	.500
UMass Lowell	7	–	9	.438	13	–	19	.406
Albany	7	–	9	.438	14	–	18	.438
Maine	5	–	11	.313	9	–	22	.290
Binghamton	4	–	12	.250	10	–	19	.345
Note: The 2020 America East tournament was cancelled prior to the championship game due to the COVID-19 pandemic.

The 2019–20 Maine Black Bears men's basketball team represented the University of Maine in the 2019–20 NCAA Division I men's basketball season. They played their home games at the Cross Insurance Center in Bangor, Maine and were led by second-year head coach Richard Barron. They were members of the America East Conference. They finished the season 9–22, 5–11 in America East play to finish in eighth place. They lost in the quarterfinals of the America East tournament to Vermont.

== Previous season ==
The Black Bears finished the 2018–19 season 5–27 overall, 3–13 in conference play to finish in a tie for eighth place. As the 8th seed in the 2019 America East men's basketball tournament, they were defeated by top-seeded Vermont 73–57 in the quarterfinals.

== Roster ==
2019–20 Maine Black Bears men's basketball team
Players
Coaches

Pos.	#	Name	Height	Weight	Year	Previous school	Hometown
F	0	Andrew Fleming	6 ft 7 in (2.01 m)	222 lb (101 kg)	Sr	Oxford Hills HS	Norway, ME
G	1	Mykhailo Yagodin	6 ft 5 in (1.96 m)	195 lb (88 kg)	Jr	South Plains College	Odesa, Ukraine
G	2	Ja'Shonté Wright-McLeish	6 ft 4 in (1.93 m)	185 lb (84 kg)	Fr	Collège Jean-de-Brébeuf	Montreal, Canada
F	3	Vilgot Larsson	6 ft 8 in (2.03 m)	215 lb (98 kg)	Jr	Hill College	Stockholm, Sweden
F	4	Ata Turgut	6 ft 9 in (2.06 m)	220 lb (100 kg)	Fr	TED Ankara Kolejliler	Ankara, Turkey
F	5	Nedeljko Prijovic	6 ft 8 in (2.03 m)	210 lb (95 kg)	Sr	Texas State	Belgrade, Serbia
F	10	Stephane Ingo	6 ft 9 in (2.06 m)	200 lb (91 kg)	RS Fr	Gould Academy	Mississauga, Ontario
G	11	Agah KizilKaya	6 ft 3 in (1.91 m)	179 lb (81 kg)	Fr	Sakarya Ugur Okullari	Copenhagen, Denmark
F	12	Veljko Radakovic	6 ft 9 in (2.06 m)	210 lb (95 kg)	Fr	Lee Academy	Novi Sad, Serbia
F	13	Miks Antoms	6 ft 8 in (2.03 m)	245 lb (111 kg)	Jr	Lee Academy	Riga, Latvia
G	15	Taylor Schildroth	6 ft 0 in (1.83 m)	175 lb (79 kg)	Fr	George Stevens Academy	Blue Hill, ME
G	21	Precious Okoh	6 ft 1 in (1.85 m)	188 lb (85 kg)	Fr	Bradford Christian Academy	Brockton, MA
F	22	Solomon Iluyomade	6 ft 7 in (2.01 m)	225 lb (102 kg)	RS So	Laramie County CC	London, England
G	25	Sergio El Darwich	6 ft 4 in (1.93 m)	205 lb (93 kg)	Sr	Western Texas College	Dekwaneh, Lebanon
G	44	Peter Stumer	6 ft 6 in (1.98 m)	185 lb (84 kg)	Fr	Alviks Basketbollklubb	Södertälje, Sweden

Head coach

- Richard Barron (Kenyon)

Assistant coach(es)

- Kevin Reed (Maine)
- Edniesha Curry (Oregon)
- Igor Vrzina (Abilene Christian)

Legend

- (C) Team captain
- (S) Suspended
- (I) Ineligible
- (W) Walk-on
- Injured
- Current redshirt

Roster
Last update: February 27, 2019

== Schedule and results ==
Date time, TV	Rank^{#}	Opponent^{#}	Result	Record	Site (attendance) city, state
Exhibition
October 27, 2019*; 1:00 pm		Husson	W 76–50	-	Cross Insurance Center (562); Bangor, ME
November 3, 2019*; 12:00 pm		McGill	W 70–63	-	Cross Insurance Center (320); Bangor, ME
Non-conference regular season
November 6, 2019*; 7:00 pm, ESPN+		Merrimack	W 84–64	1–0	Cross Insurance Center (1,089); Bangor, ME
November 10, 2019*; 2:00 pm		at Harvard	L 46–67	1–1	Lavietes Pavilion (1,234); Allston, MA
November 16, 2019*; 10:00 pm		at Portland	L 62–71	1–2	Chiles Center (1,721); Portland, OR
November 19, 2019*; 11:00 pm, P12N		at No. 25 Washington	L 53–72	1–3	Alaska Airlines Arena (8,072); Seattle, WA
November 24, 2019*; 3:00 pm		Maine Maritime Academy	W 90–50	2–3	Portland Exposition Building (1,440); Portland, ME
November 27, 2019*; 4:00 pm, ACCN		at No. 7 Virginia	L 26–46	2–4	John Paul Jones Arena (14,109); Charlottesville, VA
November 30, 2019*; 1:00 pm, ESPN+		at UConn	L 40–64	2–5	XL Center (7,129); Hartford, CT
December 4, 2019*; 7:00 pm		at Northeastern	L 63–78	2–6	Matthews Arena (628); Boston, MA
December 7, 2019*; 1:00 pm		at Central Connecticut	W 66–64	3–6	William H. Detrick Gymnasium (1,107); New Britain, CT
December 11, 2019*; 7:00 pm		Dartmouth	L 44–77	3–7	Cross Insurance Center (748); Bangor, ME
December 15, 2019*; 1:00 pm		Quinnipiac	L 61–81	3–8	Cross Insurance Center (988); Bangor, ME
December 20, 2019*; 7:00 pm, ESPN+		at UMass	L 53–74	3–9	Mullins Center (2,194); Amherst, MA
December 29, 2019*; 10:00 pm		at Hawaii	L 51–91	3–10	Stan Sheriff Center (5,036); Honolulu, HI
January 2, 2020*; 5:00 pm, ESPN+		Columbia	W 75–72 ^{OT}	4–10	Cross Insurance Center (682); Bangor, ME
America East Conference regular season
January 5, 2020; 1:00 pm, ESPN3		Stony Brook	L 52–73	4–11 (0–1)	Cross Insurance Center (798); Bangor, ME
January 8, 2020; 7:00 pm, ESPN+		at New Hampshire	L 51–57	4–12 (0–2)	Lundholm Gym (323); Durham, NH
January 11, 2020; 3:00 pm, ESPN3		at Albany	L 70–76	4–13 (0–3)	SEFCU Arena (1,885); Albany, NY
January 15, 2020; 7:00 pm, ESPN+		UMass Lowell	W 104–98	5–13 (1–3)	Cross Insurance Center (725); Bangor, ME
January 19, 2020; 2:00 pm, ESPN+		Binghamton	W 86–63	6–13 (2–3)	Cross Insurance Center (800); Bangor, ME
January 22, 2020; 7:00 pm, ESPN+		Vermont	L 57–59	6–14 (2–4)	Cross Insurance Center (929); Bangor, ME
January 25, 2020; 1:00 pm, ESPN3		at UMBC	L 53–63	6–15 (2–5)	UMBC Event Center (1,064); Catonsville, MD
February 1, 2020; 12:00 pm, ESPN3		Hartford	L 49–55	6–16 (2–6)	Cross Insurance Center (1,049); Bangor, ME
February 5, 2020; 7:00 pm, ESPN+		at Vermont	L 52–77	6–17 (2–7)	Patrick Gym (2,901); Burlington, VT
February 8, 2020; 1:00 pm, ESPN+		at Binghamton	W 82–75	7–17 (3–7)	Binghamton University Events Center (2,386); Vestal, NY
February 12, 2020; 7:00 pm, ESPN+		at UMass Lowell	L 63–71	7–18 (3–8)	Tsongas Center (511); Lowell, MA
February 16, 2020; 1:00 pm, ESPN+		Albany	L 60–66	7–19 (3–9)	Cross Insurance Center (1,149); Bangor, ME
February 22, 2020; 7:00 pm, ESPN3		at Stony Brook	L 46–54	7–20 (3–10)	Island Federal Credit Union Arena (2,928); Stony Brook, NY
February 26, 2020; 7:00 pm, ESPN+		New Hampshire	L 70–77	7–21 (3–11)	Cross Insurance Center (842); Bangor, ME
February 29, 2020; 1:00 pm, ESPN+		UMBC	W 74–48	8–21 (4–11)	Cross Insurance Center (912); Bangor, ME
March 3, 2020; 7:00 pm, ESPN+		at Hartford	W 71–65	9–21 (5–11)	Chase Arena at Reich Family Pavilion (859); West Hartford, CT
America East tournament
March 7, 2020; 7:00 pm, ESPN+	(8)	at (1) Vermont; Quarterfinals	L 50–61	9–22	Patrick Gym (3,266); Burlington, VT
*Non-conference game. ^{#}Rankings from AP Poll. (#) Tournament seedings in parentheses. All times are in Eastern.

== See also ==
- 2019–20 Maine Black Bears women's basketball team
