= 2019–20 Hartford Hawks men's basketball team =

American college basketball season

2019–20 Hartford Hawks men's basketball
- Conference: America East Conference
- Record: 18–15 (9–7 America East)
- Head coach: John Gallagher (10th season)
- Assistant coaches: Tom Devitt; Yolonzo Moore II; Tim Brooks
- Home arena: Chase Arena at Reich Family Pavilion

2019–20 America East Conference men's basketball standings
	Conf.				Overall
Team	W		L	PCT	W		L	PCT
Vermont	14	–	2	.875	26	–	7	.788
Stony Brook	10	–	6	.625	20	–	13	.606
Hartford	9	–	7	.563	18	–	15	.545
UMBC	8	–	8	.500	16	–	17	.485
New Hampshire	8	–	8	.500	15	–	15	.500
UMass Lowell	7	–	9	.438	13	–	19	.406
Albany	7	–	9	.438	14	–	18	.438
Maine	5	–	11	.313	9	–	22	.290
Binghamton	4	–	12	.250	10	–	19	.345
Note: The 2020 America East tournament was cancelled prior to the championship game due to the COVID-19 pandemic.

The 2019–20 Hartford Hawks men's basketball team represented the University of Hartford in the 2019–20 NCAA Division I men's basketball season. They played their home games at the Chase Arena at Reich Family Pavilion in West Hartford, Connecticut and were led by tenth-year head coach John Gallagher. They finished the season 18–15, 9–7 in America East play to finish in third place. They defeated UMass Lowell and Stony Brook to advance to the championship game of the America East tournament vs Vermont. However, the championship game, and all postseason tournaments, were cancelled amid the COVID-19 pandemic.

== Previous season ==
The Hawks finished the 2018–19 season 18–15 overall, 10–6 in conference play to finish in fourth place. As the 4th seed in the 2019 America East men's basketball tournament, they beat 5th-seeded UMass Lowell in the quarterfinals 78–70, then lost to 3rd-seeded UMBC in double overtime in the semifinals 85–90.

== Roster ==
2019–20 Hartford Hawks men's basketball team
Players
Coaches

Pos.	#	Name	Height	Weight	Year	Previous school	Hometown
F	0	Hunter Marks	6 ft 9 in (2.06 m)	190 lb (86 kg)	So	Wonthaggi Secondary College	Phillip Island, Australia
G/F	1	Malik Ellison	6 ft 6 in (1.98 m)	215 lb (98 kg)	GS	Pittsburgh	Voorhees, NJ
G	2	D.J. Mitchell	6 ft 0 in (1.83 m)	160 lb (73 kg)	So	St. Thomas More School	Englewood Cliffs, NJ
G/F	3	Romain Boxus	6 ft 6 in (1.98 m)	210 lb (95 kg)	Sr	Snow College	Donceel, Belgium
G	4	Moses Flowers	6 ft 3 in (1.91 m)	180 lb (82 kg)	Fr	Thayer Academy	Dorchester, MA
G	5	Cameron McCravy	6 ft 0 in (1.83 m)	170 lb (77 kg)	Fr	Combine Academy	Charlotte, NC
F	10	Nikola Colovic	6 ft 10 in (2.08 m)	225 lb (102 kg)	RS Jr	Beovuk 72	Belgrade, Serbia
G	11	PJ Henry	5 ft 10 in (1.78 m)	165 lb (75 kg)	Fr	Shadow Creek HS	Houston, TX
F	12	Miroslav Stafl	6 ft 10 in (2.08 m)	235 lb (107 kg)	Fr	DSK Basketball Nymburk	Liberec, Czech Republic
G	20	Austin Williams	6 ft 4 in (1.93 m)	200 lb (91 kg)	RS Jr	Marist	Roseland, NJ
G	21	Matt Hobbs	6 ft 4 in (1.93 m)	200 lb (91 kg)	Jr	New England	Anchorage, AK
G/F	22	Garrett Kingman	6 ft 5 in (1.96 m)	215 lb (98 kg)	Jr	Tacoma CC	Gig Harbor, WA
G	23	Michael Dunne	6 ft 0 in (1.83 m)	190 lb (86 kg)	So	Matawan Regional HS	Matawan, NJ
G	25	Traci Carter	6 ft 1 in (1.85 m)	175 lb (79 kg)	GS	La Salle	Philadelphia, PA
F/C	33	Key Sullivan	7 ft 2 in (2.18 m)	220 lb (100 kg)	GS	La Salle	Tralee, Ireland
F	45	Petr Stepanyants	6 ft 9 in (2.06 m)	200 lb (91 kg)	Jr	Balboa HS	Moscow, Russia

Head coach

- John Gallagher (Saint Joseph's)

Assistant coach(es)

- Tom Devitt (Boston College)
- Yolonzo Moore II (Hartford)
- Tim Brooks (James Madison)

Legend

- (C) Team captain
- (S) Suspended
- (I) Ineligible
- (W) Walk-on
- Injured
- Current redshirt

Roster
Last update: November 7, 2019

== Schedule and results ==
Date time, TV	Rank^{#}	Opponent^{#}	Result	Record	Site (attendance) city, state
Non-conference regular season
November 5, 2019*; 7:00 pm		at Central Connecticut; Rivalry	W 74–59	1–0	William H. Detrick Gymnasium (2,115); New Britain, CT
November 7, 2019*; 7:00 pm, ESPN+		Winthrop	L 57–67	1–1	Chase Arena at Reich Family Pavilion (1,014); West Hartford, CT
November 12, 2019*; 7:00 pm, ESPN+		at Marist	W 62–51	2–1	McCann Arena; Poughkeepsie, NY
November 16, 2019*; 2:00 pm, ESPN3		Gordon	W 86–79	3–1	Chase Arena at Reich Family Pavilion (660); West Hartford, CT
November 18, 2019*; 7:00 pm, ESPN+		at Oakland	L 50–60	3–2	Athletics Center O'rena (2,987); Auburn Hills, MI
November 21, 2019*; 11:00 am, ESPN3		Emerson	W 78–63	4–2	Chase Arena at Reich Family Pavilion (2,092); West Hartford, CT
November 24, 2019*; 2:00 pm, ESPN3		Merrimack	L 58–62	4–3	Chase Arena at Reich Family Pavilion (599); West Hartford, CT
November 27, 2019*; 7:00 pm, ESPN3		at SMU	W 90–58	4–4	Moody Coliseum (3,874); University Park, TX
November 30, 2019*; 5:30 pm, ESPN+		at Texas State	W 69–55	4–5	Strahan Arena (1,427); San Marcos, TX
December 5, 2019*; 7:00 p.m., ESPN+		St. Francis Brooklyn	L 78–84	4–6	Chase Arena at Reich Family Pavilion (577); West Hartford, CT
December 8, 2019*; 2:00 p.m., ESPN+		Sacred Heart	L 62–79	4–7	Chase Arena at Reich Family Pavilion (845); West Hartford, CT
December 14, 2019*; 2:00 p.m.		Wagner	W 71–63	5–7	Chase Arena at Reich Family Pavilion (698); West Hartford, CT
December 22, 2019*; 2:00 p.m., ESPN+		Cornell	W 80–76	6–7	Chase Arena at Reich Family Pavilion (662); West Hartford, CT
December 29, 2019*; 4:00 p.m., BTN		at Northwestern	W 67–66	7–7	Welsh–Ryan Arena (5,304); Evanston, IL
December 31, 2019*; 12:00 p.m.		at Bowling Green	L 68–81	7–8	Stroh Center (1,632); Bowling Green, OH
America East Conference regular season
January 4, 2020; 2:00 p.m., ESPN+		New Hampshire	W 61–52	8–8 (1–0)	Chase Arena at Reich Family Pavilion (770); West Hartford, CT
January 8, 2020; 7:00 p.m., ESPN+		at UMass Lowell	L 68–80	9–8 (2–0)	Tsongas Center (478); Lowell, MA
January 15, 2020; 7:00 p.m., ESPN3		Stony Brook	W 68–65	10–8 (3–0)	Chase Arena at Reich Family Pavilion (846); West Hartford, CT
January 18, 2020; 2:00 p.m., ESPN+		at Vermont	L 57–74	10–9 (3–1)	Patrick Gym (3,266); Burlington, VT
January 22, 2020; 7:00 p.m., ESPN+		UMBC	L 60–69	10–10 (3–2)	Chase Arena at Reich Family Pavilion (1,188); West Hartford, CT
January 25, 2020; 3:00 p.m., ESPN3		at Albany	W 62–48	11–10 (4–2)	SEFCU Arena (2,402); Albany, NY
January 29, 2020; 7:00 p.m., ESPN+		Binghamton	W 73–57	12–10 (5–2)	Chase Arena at Reich Family Pavilion (630); West Hartford, CT
February 1, 2020; 12:00 p.m., ESPN3		at Maine	W 55–49	13–10 (6–2)	Cross Insurance Center (1,049); Bangor, ME
February 5, 2020; 7:00 p.m., ESPN+		at UMBC	L 59–70	13–11 (6–3)	UMBC Event Center (1,365); Catonsville, MD
February 8, 2020; 7:00 p.m., ESPN+		Vermont	L 68–69	13–12 (6–4)	Chase Arena at Reich Family Pavilion (1,734); West Hartford, CT
February 12, 2020; 7:00 p.m., ESPN3		Albany	W 66–60	14–12 (7–4)	Chase Arena at Reich Family Pavilion (951); West Hartford, CT
February 15, 2020; 2:00 p.m., ESPN+		UMass Lowell	L 67–74	14–13 (7–5)	Chase Arena at Reich Family Pavilion (937); West Hartford, CT
February 20, 2020; 7:00 p.m., ESPN+		at New Hampshire	L 63–67 ^{OT}	14–14 (7–6)	Lundholm Gym (530); Durham, NH
February 22, 2020; 4:00 p.m., ESPN3		at Binghamton	W 75–74	15–14 (8–6)	Binghamton University Events Center (2,911); Vestal, NY
February 26, 2020; 7:00 p.m., ESPN+		at Stony Brook	W 65–54	16–14 (9–6)	Island Federal Credit Union Arena (2,468); Stony Brook, NY
March 3, 2020; 7:00 p.m., ESPN+		Maine	L 65–71	16–15 (9–7)	Chase Arena at Reich Family Pavilion (859); West Hartford, CT
America East tournament
March 7, 2020; 5:00 pm, ESPN3	(3)	(6) UMass Lowell; Quarterfinals	W 89–75	17–15	Chase Arena at Reich Family Pavilion (1,069); West Hartford, CT
March 10, 2020; 2:30 pm, ESPN+	(3)	at (2) Stony Brook; Semifinals	W 64–58	18–15	Island Federal Credit Union Arena (1,861); Stony Brook, NY
March 14, 2020; 11:00 am, ESPN2	(3)	at (1) Vermont; Championship	Cancelled due to the COVID-19 pandemic		Patrick Gym; Burlington, VT
*Non-conference game. ^{#}Rankings from AP Poll. (#) Tournament seedings in parentheses. All times are in Eastern.
