= Frankie Policelli =

American basketball player (born 2000)

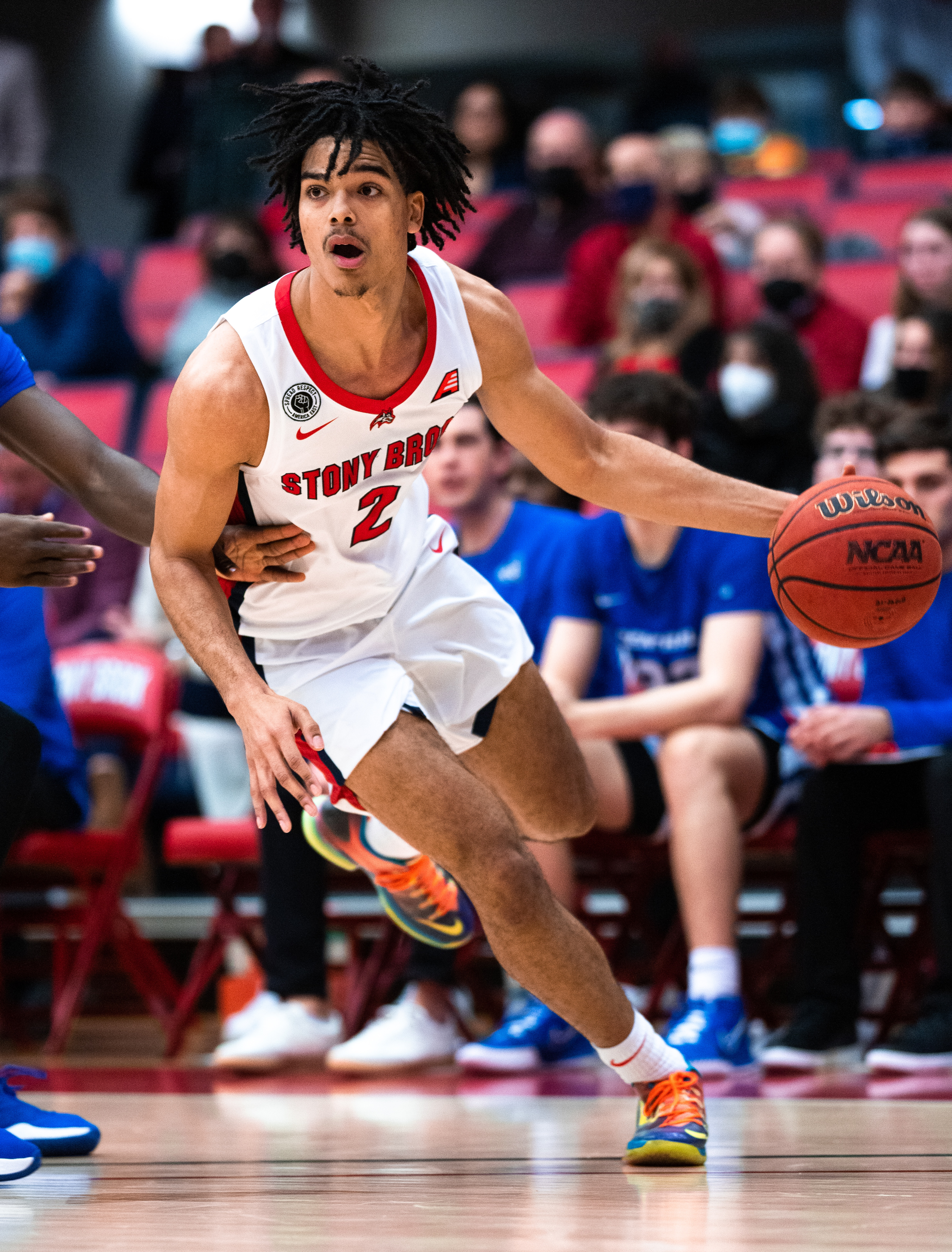
- Policelli playing for Stony Brook in 2022

No. 5 – Cheshire Phoenix
- Position: Small forward
- League: SLB

Personal information
- Born: April 11, 2000 (age 26) New Hartford, New York, U.S.
- Listed height: 6 ft 9 in (2.06 m)
- Listed weight: 225 lb (102 kg)

Career information
- High school: Long Island Lutheran (Brookville, New York)
- College: Dayton (2018–2019); Stony Brook (2020–2023); Charleston (2023–2024)
- NBA draft: 2024: undrafted
- Playing career: 2024–present

Career history
- 2024: Long Island Nets
- 2025: Valmiera Glass VIA
- 2025-present: Cheshire Phoenix

Frankie Andrew Policelli (born April 11, 2000) is an American professional basketball player who plays for the Cheshire Phoenix of the Super League Basketball (SLB). He spent the majority of his college basketball career with the Stony Brook Seawolves, also playing a year for the Dayton Flyers and Charleston Cougars.

== Early life ==
Policelli grew up in New Hartford, New York with his parents Angie and Frank. His father Frank is an attorney in Utica.

Policelli began his high school career at New Hartford Senior High School, playing for head coach John Randall. He averaged 13.5 points per game as a freshman and 20.3 as a sophomore. However, after averaging 28.1 points, his junior season was cut short in January after requiring season-ending knee surgery. He was ranked among the nation's top 100 juniors by HoopSeen.

For his senior year, he transferred to Long Island Lutheran High School in Brookville, New York. Policelli said, "I felt like if I stayed in New Hartford, it would have been more like last year. I would play hard sometimes when I needed to and other times I would do what I want. If I went to a harder school, physically... I'd have to play my hardest every single minute." He was named a USA Today second-team All-New York selection and Mr. New York State Basketball finalist.

As a three-star recruit, Policelli made official visits to Dayton, George Washington and Stony Brook. 247Sports ranked him as the seventh-best overall recruit in New York and the 63rd-best small forward in the country. On April 23, 2018, Policelli officially committed to Dayton.

== College career ==
=== Dayton ===
Initially, Dayton planned to redshirt Policelli for the 2018–19 season, but that changed after a season-ending injury to Jhery Matos. Policelli made his collegiate debut for Dayton on November 30, 2018 against Mississippi State. On April 9, 2019, Policelli announced that he was entering the transfer portal and leaving Dayton after one season. In 20 games, he averaged 0.9 points in 4.8 minutes per game.

=== Stony Brook ===
Policelli committed to Stony Brook on May 8, 2019. On October 24, 2019, the NCAA denied Policelli's waiver to play in the 2019–20 season, forcing him to sit out a year per mandatory transfer rules.

Policelli made his Stony Brook debut on December 1, 2020 against Saint Peter's, scoring a team-high 16 points. He recorded his first double-double with 14 points and 10 rebounds against St. John's on December 6. He ended the season as the team's second-leading scorer with 10.7 points per game in 21 games and 14 starts.

In the 2021–22 season, Policelli played 29 games and made 23 starts. He set a new career high with 22 points in a win over Yale on November 28, 2021. He averaged 7.7 points per game and made 36.1% of his three-pointers.

As a redshirt senior, Policelli returned to Stony Brook for the 2022–23 season. He recorded a career-high 19 rebounds against Army on December 18, 2022, tied for fourth-most in a single game in Seawolves' Division I history and the most by a Stony Brook player since 2016. On January 26, 2023, Policelli scored a new career-high 25 points against William & Mary. The next game, on January 28, Policelli scored 34 points at Hampton, including 31 of the team's 41 points in the second half, to set his final single-game career high. On March 4 against North Carolina A&T, Policelli became the first player with at least 30 points and 15 rebounds in a CAA Tournament game since David Robinson for Navy in 1986. He started all 33 games and averaged 13.7 points and 9.4 rebounds per game. He led the Colonial Athletic Association in rebounds per game and was sixth in the NCAA for defensive rebounds per game. His 15 double-doubles were the third-most in a single season for Stony Brook, and his 310 rebounds were the fourth-most.

=== Charleston ===
For his final season of college eligibility, Policelli transferred within the CAA to Charleston. He scored his 1000th career point against The Citadel on December 14, 2023. On February 10, 2024, he scored a season-high 22 points and tied his career high with six threes against Drexel. Charleston won the CAA regular season title and advanced to the championship game of the 2024 CAA Tournament, where Policelli faced his former school Stony Brook. He scored 12 points in Charleston's 82–79 overtime win to reach the NCAA Tournament for the first time, and was named to the CAA All-Tournament team.

As a 13-seed, Charleston played 4-seed Alabama in the first round. Policelli scored 15 points as Charleston lost 109–96. He ended the season averaging 9.5 points and 5.1 rebounds per game while starting all 35 contests for Charleston.

== Professional career ==
=== Long Island Nets (2024) ===
After going undrafted in the 2024 NBA draft, Policelli joined the Long Island Nets on October 27, 2024 after a tryout and on November 10, he made his professional debut against the Westchester Knicks, scoring five points in four minutes. On December 27, he was waived by Long Island.

On January 10, 2025, he signed with Valmiera Glass VIA in Latvia.

== Career statistics ==
Legend
GP	Games played	GS	Games started	MPG	Minutes per game
FG%	Field goal percentage	3P%	3-point field goal percentage	FT%	Free throw percentage
RPG	Rebounds per game	APG	Assists per game	SPG	Steals per game
BPG	Blocks per game	PPG	Points per game	**Bold**	Career high

=== College ===
Year	Team	GP	GS	MPG	FG%	3P%	FT%	RPG	APG	SPG	BPG	PPG
2018–19	Dayton	20	1	4.8	.333	.308	.000	0.5	0.5	0.1	0.1	0.9
2019–20	Stony Brook	Redshirt (ineligible)										
2020–21	Stony Brook	21	14	27.3	.385	.319	**.845**	4.3	1.1	0.7	0.3	10.7
2021–22	Stony Brook	29	23	24.7	.385	.361	.804	4.5	1.4	0.7	**0.4**	7.7
2022–23	Stony Brook	33	33	**33.3**	**.422**	**.368**	.802	**9.4**	**1.8**	**0.7**	0.3	**13.7**
2023–24	Charleston	**35**	**35**	21.3	.375	.343	.838	5.1	0.7	0.4	0.3	9.5
Career		138	106	23.4	.394	.348	.811	5.2	1.1	0.5	0.3	9.1
