= 2019–20 Stony Brook Seawolves men's basketball team =

American college basketball season

2019–20 Stony Brook Seawolves men's basketball
- Conference: America East Conference
- Record: 20–13 (10–6 America East)
- Head coach: Geno Ford (1st season)
- Assistant coaches: Bryan Weber; Dan Rickard; Randal Holt
- Home arena: Island Federal Credit Union Arena

2019–20 America East Conference men's basketball standings
	Conf.				Overall
Team	W		L	PCT	W		L	PCT
Vermont	14	–	2	.875	26	–	7	.788
Stony Brook	10	–	6	.625	20	–	13	.606
Hartford	9	–	7	.563	18	–	15	.545
UMBC	8	–	8	.500	16	–	17	.485
New Hampshire	8	–	8	.500	15	–	15	.500
UMass Lowell	7	–	9	.438	13	–	19	.406
Albany	7	–	9	.438	14	–	18	.438
Maine	5	–	11	.313	9	–	22	.290
Binghamton	4	–	12	.250	10	–	19	.345
Note: The 2020 America East tournament was cancelled prior to the championship game due to the COVID-19 pandemic.

The 2019–20 Stony Brook Seawolves men's basketball team represented Stony Brook University in the 2019–20 NCAA Division I men's basketball season. They played their home games at the Island Federal Credit Union Arena in Stony Brook, New York and were led by first-year head coach Geno Ford, who took over for former head coach Jeff Boals, who left the school to accept the head coaching position at Ohio. They are members of the America East Conference. They finished the season 20–13, 10–6 in America East play to finish in second place. They defeated Albany in the quarterfinals of the America East tournament before losing in the semifinals to Hartford.

== Previous season ==
The Seawolves finished the 2018–19 season 24–9 overall, 12–4 in conference play to finish in second place. In the America East tournament, they were upset in the quarterfinals by Binghamton. They were invited to the College Basketball Invitational, where they lost to South Florida in the first round.

== Offseason ==
=== Departures ===
Name	Number	Pos.	Height	Weight	Year	Hometown	Notes
Jaron Cornish	0	G	5'11"	178	Senior	Abaco, Bahamas	Graduated
Jules Moor	1	G	6'5"	202	Freshman	Houston, TX	Transferred to Texas State
Corry Long	5	G	6'2"	180	Sophomore	Cincinnati, OH	Transferred to Southern New Hampshire
Akwasi Yeboah	15	G/F	6'6"	235	R-Junior	Chigwell, England	Transferred to Rutgers
Nick Aubry	42	F	6'7"	240	Freshman	Port Jefferson, NY	Walk-on

=== Incoming transfers ===
Name	Number	Pos.	Height	Weight	Year	Hometown	Previous School
Frankie Policelli	0	F	6'7"	211	Sophomore	New Hartford, NY	Transferred from Dayton
Mouhamadou Gueye	5	F	6'9"	210	Junior	Staten Island, NY	Junior college transferred from Monroe College

Note: Policelli was deemed ineligible for the 2019–20 season due to NCAA transfer regulations.

=== 2019 recruiting class ===
College recruiting information
Name	Hometown	School	Height	Weight	Commit date
Tyler Stephenson-Moore; SG	Port Washington, NY	Long Island Lutheran	6 ft 3 in (1.91 m)	170 lb (77 kg)	Dec 18, 2018
Tyler Stephenson-Moore; SG	Recruit ratings: Scout: Rivals: (NR)				
Tavin Pierre Philippe; SG	Freeport, NY	Baldwin High School	6 ft 3 in (1.91 m)	180 lb (82 kg)	Apr 30, 2019
Tavin Pierre Philippe; SG	Recruit ratings: Scout: Rivals: (NR)				
Overall recruit ranking:
Note: In many cases, Scout, Rivals, 247Sports, On3, and ESPN may conflict in their listings of height and weight.; In these cases, the average was taken. ESPN grades are on a 100-point scale.; Sources: "2020 Team Ranking". Rivals.

== Roster ==
2019–20 Stony Brook Seawolves men's basketball team
Players
Coaches

Pos.	#	Name	Height	Weight	Year	Previous school	Hometown
F	0	Frankie Policelli (I)	6 ft 7 in (2.01 m)	215 lb (98 kg)	So	Dayton	New Hartford, NY
G	1	Makale Foreman	6 ft 1 in (1.85 m)	190 lb (86 kg)	RS Jr	Chattanooga	Kingsport, TN
G	2	Miles Latimer	6 ft 3 in (1.91 m)	190 lb (86 kg)	So	Paul VI Catholic HS	Fairfax, VA
G/F	3	Elijah Olaniyi	6 ft 5 in (1.96 m)	205 lb (93 kg)	Jr	Newark East Side HS	Newark, NJ
C	4	Jeff Otchere	6 ft 11 in (2.11 m)	243 lb (110 kg)	So	Garden City CC	Bronx, NY
F	5	Mouhamadou Gueye	6 ft 9 in (2.06 m)	210 lb (95 kg)	Jr	Monroe College	Staten Island, NY
G	10	Jordan McKenzie	6 ft 1 in (1.85 m)	190 lb (86 kg)	Jr	Hargrave Military Academy	Concord, NC
G	11	Hassan Ceesay	6 ft 4 in (1.93 m)	189 lb (86 kg)	So	Newark East Side HS	Newark, NJ
F	12	Quari Alleyne	6 ft 2 in (1.88 m)	183 lb (83 kg)	Jr	Ossining High School	Ossining, NY
G	14	Tyler Stephenson-Moore	6 ft 3 in (1.91 m)	186 lb (84 kg)	Fr	Long Island Lutheran HS	Port Washington, NY
G	15	Tavin Pierre Philippe	6 ft 3 in (1.91 m)	187 lb (85 kg)	Fr	Baldwin HS	Freeport, NY
C	21	Alex Christie	7 ft 0 in (2.13 m)	280 lb (127 kg)	So	The MacDuffie School	Oakville, Ontario
G/F	23	Andrew Garcia	6 ft 5 in (1.96 m)	228 lb (103 kg)	RS Jr	The Master's School (CT)	Harlem, NY
G	24	Lenny Kadisha	6 ft 4 in (1.93 m)	238 lb (108 kg)	Jr	Monroe College	Corona, NY
F	35	Anthony Ochefu	6 ft 8 in (2.03 m)	250 lb (113 kg)	Jr	Westtown School	West Chester, PA

Head coach

- Geno Ford (Ohio)

Assistant coach(es)

- Bryan Weber (Akron)
- Dan Rickard (Stony Brook)
- Randal Holt (Kent State)

Legend

- (C) Team captain
- (S) Suspended
- (I) Ineligible
- (W) Walk-on
- Injured
- Current redshirt

Roster
Last update: September 14, 2019

== Schedule and results ==
Date time, TV	Rank^{#}	Opponent^{#}	Result	Record	Site (attendance) city, state
Non-conference regular season
November 5, 2019*; 7:00 pm, SNY		Yale	L 69–74 ^{OT}	0–1	Island Federal Credit Union Arena (3,183); Stony Brook, NY
November 9, 2019*; 2:30 pm, YES/FSN		at No. 12 Seton Hall	L 57–74	0–2	Walsh Gymnasium (1,655); South Orange, NJ
November 11, 2019*; 7:00 pm, ESPN3		Farmingdale State	W 91–44	1–2	Island Federal Credit Union Arena (2,049); Stony Brook, NY
November 15, 2019*; 8:30 pm, Team1Sports		at Texas A&M–Corpus Christi; Islander Invitational	W 68–63	2–2	American Bank Center (1,078); Corpus Christi, TX
November 16, 2019*; 5:00 pm, Team1Sports		vs. Texas–Rio Grande Valley; Islander Invitational	W 69–58	3–2	American Bank Center (457); Corpus Christi, TX
November 17, 2019*; 2:00 pm, Team1Sports		vs. North Dakota State; Islander Invitational	W 64–57	4–2	American Bank Center (468); Corpus Christi, TX
November 23, 2019*; 3:00 pm		at Wagner	W 87–84 ^{OT}	5–2	Spiro Sports Center (1,266); Staten Island, NY
November 27, 2019*; 7:00 pm, FloSports		at Delaware	L 61–75	5–3	Bob Carpenter Center (1,771); Newark, DE
December 2, 2019*; 7:00 pm, ESPN+		Manhattan	W 65–47	6–3	Island Federal Credit Union Arena (2,083); Stony Brook, NY
December 7, 2019*; 7:00 pm, SNY		Brown	W 79–63	7–3	Island Federal Credit Union Arena (2,943); Stony Brook, NY
December 10, 2019*; 7:00 pm, FloSports		at Hofstra	L 63–71	7–4	Mack Sports Complex (3,111); Hempstead, NY
December 14, 2019*; 8:00 pm, FS1		at Providence	L 78–82	7–5	Dunkin' Donuts Center (5,861); Providence, RI
December 18, 2019*; 6:30 pm, ACCN		at No. 9 Virginia	L 44–56	7–6	John Paul Jones Arena (13,665); Charlottesville, VA
December 21, 2019*; 2:00 pm, Stadium		at American	W 77–74	8–6	Bender Arena (1,119); Washington, D.C.
December 29, 2019*; 12:00 pm, ESPN3		Norfolk State	W 81–65	9–6	Island Federal Credit Union Arena (2,488); Stony Brook, NY
America East Conference regular season
January 5, 2020; 1:00 pm, ESPN3		at Maine	W 73–52	10–6 (1–0)	Cross Insurance Center (798); Bangor, ME
January 8, 2020; 7:00 pm, ESPN+		at Vermont	W 81–77	11–6 (2–0)	Patrick Gym (2,847); Burlington, VT
January 11, 2020; 7:00 pm, ESPN+		New Hampshire	W 73–48	12–6 (3–0)	Island Federal Credit Union Arena (2,422); Stony Brook, NY
January 15, 2020; 7:00 pm, ESPN3		at Hartford	L 65–68	12–7 (3–1)	Chase Arena at Reich Family Pavilion (846); West Hartford, CT
January 18, 2020; 7:00 pm, ESPN3		Albany	W 70–62	13–7 (4–1)	Island Federal Credit Union Arena (2,763); Stony Brook, NY
January 22, 2020; 7:00 pm, ESPN+		Binghamton	L 79–83	13–8 (4–2)	Island Federal Credit Union Arena (2,261); Stony Brook, NY
January 29, 2020; 7:00 pm, ESPN+		at UMass Lowell	W 84–76	14–8 (5–2)	Tsongas Center (734); Lowell, MA
February 1, 2020; 7:00 pm, SNY/ESPN+		UMBC	W 74–63	15–8 (6–2)	Island Federal Credit Union Arena (4,009); Stony Brook, NY
February 5, 2020; 7:00 pm, ESPN+		UMass Lowell	W 77–70	16–8 (7–2)	Island Federal Credit Union Arena (2,504); Stony Brook, NY
February 8, 2020; 7:00 pm, ESPN3		at New Hampshire	L 64–81	16–9 (7–3)	Lundholm Gym (599); Durham, NH
February 12, 2020; 7:00 pm, ESPN+		at Binghamton	W 75–70	17–9 (8–3)	Binghamton University Events Center (4,238); Vestal, NY
February 20, 2020; 7:00 pm, ESPNU		Vermont	L 54–63	17–10 (8–4)	Island Federal Credit Union Arena (4,009); Stony Brook, NY
February 22, 2020; 7:00 pm, ESPN3		Maine	W 54–46	18–10 (9–4)	Island Federal Credit Union Arena (2,928); Stony Brook, NY
February 26, 2020; 7:00 pm, ESPN+		Hartford	L 54–65	18–11 (9–5)	Island Federal Credit Union Arena (2,468); Stony Brook, NY
February 29, 2020; 7:00 pm, ESPN3		at Albany	W 52–49	19–11 (10–5)	SEFCU Arena (2,564); Albany, NY
March 3, 2020; 7:00 pm, ESPN+		at UMBC	L 67–75	19–12 (10–6)	UMBC Event Center (1,636); Baltimore, MD
America East tournament
March 7, 2020; 7:00 pm, ESPN3	(2)	(7) Albany; Quarterfinals	W 76–73	20–12	Island Federal Credit Union Arena (2,166); Stony Brook, NY
March 10, 2020; 7:00 pm, ESPN+	(2)	(3) Hartford; Semifinals	L 58–64	20–13	Island Federal Credit Union Arena (1,861); Stony Brook, NY
*Non-conference game. ^{#}Rankings from AP Poll. (#) Tournament seedings in parentheses. All times are in Eastern.

== See also ==
2019–20 Stony Brook Seawolves women's basketball team
