= 2019–20 UMass Lowell River Hawks men's basketball team =

American college basketball season

2019–20 UMass Lowell River Hawks men's basketball
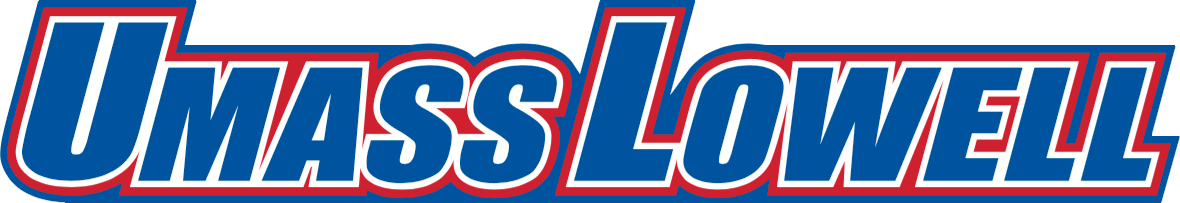
- Conference: America East Conference
- Record: 13–19 (7–9 America East)
- Head coach: Pat Duquette (7th season)
- Assistant coaches: Biko Paris; Nick Leonardelli; Louis Hinnant
- Home arena: Costello Athletic Center; Tsongas Center

2019–20 America East Conference men's basketball standings
	Conf.				Overall
Team	W		L	PCT	W		L	PCT
Vermont	14	–	2	.875	26	–	7	.788
Stony Brook	10	–	6	.625	20	–	13	.606
Hartford	9	–	7	.563	18	–	15	.545
UMBC	8	–	8	.500	16	–	17	.485
New Hampshire	8	–	8	.500	15	–	15	.500
UMass Lowell	7	–	9	.438	13	–	19	.406
Albany	7	–	9	.438	14	–	18	.438
Maine	5	–	11	.313	9	–	22	.290
Binghamton	4	–	12	.250	10	–	19	.345
Note: The 2020 America East tournament was cancelled prior to the championship game due to the COVID-19 pandemic.

The 2019–20 UMass Lowell River Hawks men's basketball team represented the University of Massachusetts Lowell in the 2019–20 NCAA Division I men's basketball season. They split their home games between the Costello Athletic Center and the Tsongas Center, both of which are located in Lowell, Massachusetts, and were led by seventh-year head coach Pat Duquette. They finished the season 13–19, 7–9 in America East play to finish in a tie for sixth place. They lost in the quarterfinals of the America East tournament to Hartford.

== Previous season ==
The River Hawks finished the 2018–19 season 15–17, 7–9 in conference play to finish in a tie for fifth place. In the America East tournament, they were defeated by Hartford in the quarterfinals.

== Roster ==
2019–20 UMass Lowell River Hawks men's basketball team
Players
Coaches

Pos.	#	Name	Height	Weight	Year	Previous school	Hometown
G	0	Ron Mitchell	6 ft 3 in (1.91 m)	170 lb (77 kg)	Fr	Fairfax HS	Philadelphia, PA
G	1	Bryce Daley	6 ft 4 in (1.93 m)	190 lb (86 kg)	So	Salisbury School	Pittsfield, MA
G	2	Kalil Thomas	6 ft 4 in (1.93 m)	185 lb (84 kg)	Fr	Holy Cross HS	New Orleans, LA
G	3	Jordyn Owens	6 ft 1 in (1.85 m)	180 lb (82 kg)	Jr	Immaculate Conception HS	Montclair, NJ
F	4	Darius Henderson	6 ft 9 in (2.06 m)	230 lb (104 kg)	So	La Salle College Prep	Pasadena, CA
F	5	Connor Withers	6 ft 7 in (2.01 m)	195 lb (88 kg)	Fr	Osbourn HS	Manassas, VA
G	11	Obadiah Noel	6 ft 4 in (1.93 m)	190 lb (86 kg)	Jr	Tuscarora HS	Frederick, MD
G/F	12	Josh Gantz	6 ft 7 in (2.01 m)	220 lb (100 kg)	GS	Bishop Ready HS	Grove City, OH
F	14	Joey Glynn	6 ft 6 in (1.98 m)	220 lb (100 kg)	So	Portsmouth HS	Portsmouth, NH
F	15	Allin Blunt	6 ft 7 in (2.01 m)	205 lb (93 kg)	So	Gonzaga College HS	Bowie, MD
G	21	Donovan Ivory	6 ft 5 in (1.96 m)	190 lb (86 kg)	Fr	Kaukauna HS	Appleton, WI
G	23	Christian Lutete	6 ft 5 in (1.96 m)	200 lb (91 kg)	GS	Radford	Silver Spring, MD
G	33	Luka Maziashvili	6 ft 2 in (1.88 m)	180 lb (82 kg)	Fr	School Zenith	Tbilisi, Georgia

Head coach

- Pat Duquette (Williams)

Assistant coach(es)

- Biko Paris (Boston College)
- Nick Leonardelli (Dickinson)
- Louis Hinnant (Boston College)

Legend

- (C) Team captain
- (S) Suspended
- (I) Ineligible
- (W) Walk-on
- Injured
- Current redshirt

Roster
Last update: March 20, 2020

== Schedule and results ==
Date time, TV	Rank^{#}	Opponent^{#}	Result	Record	Site (attendance) city, state
Non-conference regular season
November 5, 2019*; 7:00 pm, NESN/ESPN+		at UMass	L 64–79	0–1	Mullins Center (2,563); Amherst, MA
November 8, 2019*; 7:00 pm		at LIU	W 87–74	1–1	Steinberg Wellness Center (681); Brooklyn, NY
November 10, 2019*; 4:00 pm, ESPNU		at No. 18 Ohio State	L 56–76	1–2	Value City Arena (11,632); Columbus, OH
November 12, 2019*; 7:00 pm		UMass Boston	W 88–45	2–2	Costello Athletic Center (557); Lowell, MA
November 15, 2019*; 7:00 pm, ESPN3		Jacksonville; River Hawk Invitational	L 78–80	2–3	Costello Athletic Center (1,166); Lowell, MA
November 16, 2019*; 4:00 pm, ESPN3		Merrimack; River Hawk Invitational	L 58–60	2–4	Costello Athletic Center (696); Lowell, MA
November 17, 2019*; 3:30 pm, ESPN3		Dartmouth; River Hawk Invitational	L 75–80	2–5	Costello Athletic Center (534); Lowell, MA
November 26, 2019*; 5:00 pm, ESPN+		Brown	W 75–63	3–5	Costello Athletic Center (501); Lowell, MA
December 1, 2019*; 1:00 pm, ESPN+		Central Connecticut	W 73–71	4–5	Tsongas Center (779); Lowell, MA
December 4, 2019*; 7:00 pm, ESPN+		Sacred Heart	L 86–89	4–6	Tsongas Center (554); Lowell, MA
December 7, 2019*; 1:00 pm, ESPN+		St. Francis Brooklyn	W 94–63	5–6	Costello Athletic Center (443); Lowell, MA
December 11, 2019*; 7:00 pm, ESPN+		at NJIT	W 72–66	6–6	Wellness and Events Center (355); Newark, NJ
December 21, 2019*; 1:00 pm, ESPN3		Boston University	L 62–74	6–7	Tsongas Center (773); Lowell, MA
December 27, 2019*; 7:00 pm		at Loyola (MD)	L 81–93	6–8	Reitz Arena (544); Baltimore, MD
December 29, 2019*; 2:00 pm, FS1		at No. 11 Michigan	L 60–86	6–9	Crisler Center (12,707); Ann Arbor, MI
America East Conference regular season
January 4, 2020; 1:00 pm, ESPN+		at UMBC	W 86–73 ^{OT}	7–9 (1–0)	UMBC Event Center (1,219); Baltimore, MD
January 8, 2020; 7:00 pm, ESPN+		Hartford	L 68–80	7–10 (1–1)	Tsongas Center (478); Lowell, MA
January 11, 2020; 5:30 pm, ESPN+		Binghamton	W 85–66	8–10 (2–1)	Tsongas Center (1,420); Lowell, MA
January 15, 2020; 7:00 pm, ESPN+		at Maine	L 98–104 ^{OT}	8–11 (2–2)	Cross Insurance Center (725); Bangor, ME
January 22, 2020; 7:00 pm, ESPN+		at Albany	L 75–101	8–12 (2–3)	SEFCU Arena (2,055); Albany, NY
January 25, 2020; 7:00 pm, ESPN+		at Vermont	L 62–92	8–13 (2–4)	Patrick Gym (3,228); Burlington, VT
January 29, 2020; 7:00 pm, ESPN+		Stony Brook	L 76–84	8–14 (2–5)	Tsongas Center (734); Lowell, MA
February 1, 2020; 5:30 pm, ESPN+		New Hampshire	W 77–75	9–14 (3–5)	Tsongas Center (2,323); Lowell, MA
February 5, 2020; 7:00 pm, ESPN+		at Stony Brook	L 70–77	9–15 (3–6)	Island Federal Credit Union Arena (2,504); Stony Brook, NY
February 8, 2020; 4:00 pm, NESNPlus/ESPN3		UMBC	L 50–60	9–16 (3–7)	Tsongas Center (1,259); Lowell, MA
February 12, 2020; 7:00 pm, ESPN+		Maine	W 71–63	10–16 (4–7)	Tsongas Center (511); Lowell, MA
February 15, 2020; 2:00 pm, ESPN+		at Hartford	W 74–67	11–16 (5–7)	Chase Arena at Reich Family Pavilion (937); West Hartford, CT
February 20, 2020; 7:00 pm, ESPN+		at Binghamton	L 84–86	11–17 (5–8)	Binghamton University Events Center (1,645); Vestal, NY
February 26, 2020; 7:00 pm, ESPN+		Albany	W 88–69	12–17 (6–8)	Tsongas Center (819); Lowell, MA
February 29, 2020; 5:30 pm, ESPN+		Vermont	L 77–94	12–18 (6–9)	Tsongas Center (2,821); Lowell, MA
March 3, 2020; 7:00 pm, ESPN+		at New Hampshire	W 63–54	13–18 (7–9)	Lundholm Gym (573); Durham, NH
America East tournament
March 7, 2020; 5:00 pm, ESPN+	(6)	at (3) Hartford; Quarterfinals	L 75–89	13–19	Chase Arena at Reich Family Pavilion (1,069); West Hartford, CT
*Non-conference game. ^{#}Rankings from AP Poll. (#) Tournament seedings in parentheses. All times are in Eastern.
