= 2019–20 New Hampshire Wildcats men's basketball team =

American college basketball season

2019–20 New Hampshire Wildcats men's basketball
- Conference: America East Conference
- Record: 15–15 (8–8 America East)
- Head coach: Bill Herrion (15th season)
- Assistant coaches: Chris Mohr; Jordon Bronner; Ryan Herrion
- Home arena: Lundholm Gym

2019–20 America East Conference men's basketball standings
	Conf.				Overall
Team	W		L	PCT	W		L	PCT
Vermont	14	–	2	.875	26	–	7	.788
Stony Brook	10	–	6	.625	20	–	13	.606
Hartford	9	–	7	.563	18	–	15	.545
UMBC	8	–	8	.500	16	–	17	.485
New Hampshire	8	–	8	.500	15	–	15	.500
UMass Lowell	7	–	9	.438	13	–	19	.406
Albany	7	–	9	.438	14	–	18	.438
Maine	5	–	11	.313	9	–	22	.290
Binghamton	4	–	12	.250	10	–	19	.345
Note: The 2020 America East tournament was cancelled prior to the championship game due to the COVID-19 pandemic.

The 2019–20 New Hampshire Wildcats men's basketball team represented the University of New Hampshire in the 2019–20 NCAA Division I men's basketball season. They played their home games at the Lundholm Gym in Durham, New Hampshire and were led by 15th-year head coach Bill Herrion. They finished the season 15–15, 8–8 in America East play to finish in a tie for fourth place. They lost in the quarterfinals of the America East tournament to UMBC.

== Previous season ==
The Wildcats finished the 2018–19 season 5–24 overall, 3–13 in conference play to finish in a tie for eighth place. They failed to qualify for the 2019 America East men's basketball tournament.

== Roster ==
2019–20 New Hampshire Wildcats men's basketball team
Players
Coaches

Pos.	#	Name	Height	Weight	Year	Previous school	Hometown
G	0	Kijana Love	6 ft 1 in (1.85 m)	180 lb (82 kg)	Sr	Byron P. Steele II HS	Cibolo, TX
G	1	Marque Maultsby	6 ft 3 in (1.91 m)	165 lb (75 kg)	So	Garner Magnet HS	Raleigh, NC
G	2	Sean Sutherlin	6 ft 5 in (1.96 m)	185 lb (84 kg)	Jr	Irondale HS	New Brighton, MN
F	3	Nick Guadarrama	6 ft 5 in (1.96 m)	225 lb (102 kg)	So	Perkiomen School	Newington, CT
G	5	Mark Carbone	6 ft 2 in (1.88 m)	190 lb (86 kg)	Sr	East Catholic HS	Wethersfield, CT
G	10	Nick Johnson	6 ft 4 in (1.93 m)	190 lb (86 kg)	Fr	All Hallows HS	Bronx, NY
G	11	Blondeau Tchoukuiengo	6 ft 2 in (1.88 m)	180 lb (82 kg)	RS So	Montmorency School	Montreal, Quebec
G	13	Elijah Jordan	6 ft 1 in (1.85 m)	185 lb (84 kg)	Jr	The First Academy	Orlando, FL
G	15	Josh Hopkins	6 ft 5 in (1.96 m)	185 lb (84 kg)	So	James B. Dudley HS	Greensboro, NC
F	21	Meekness Payne	6 ft 8 in (2.03 m)	200 lb (91 kg)	So	Arizona Compass Prep	Phoenix, AZ
F	23	Chris Lester	6 ft 6 in (1.98 m)	225 lb (102 kg)	Sr	Barrington HS	Barrington, IL
F	24	Jayden Martinez	6 ft 7 in (2.01 m)	195 lb (88 kg)	Fr	Byron P. Steele II HS	Cibolo, TX
F	44	Luke Rosinski	6 ft 8 in (2.03 m)	235 lb (107 kg)	Sr	Kimball Union Academy	Derry, NH

Head coach

- Bill Herrion (Merrimack)

Assistant coach(es)

- Chris Mohr (Merrimack)
- Jordon Bronner (New Hampshire)
- Ryan Herrion (New Hampshire)

Legend

- (C) Team captain
- (S) Suspended
- (I) Ineligible
- (W) Walk-on
- Injured
- Current redshirt

Roster
Last update: September 14, 2019

== Schedule and results ==
Date time, TV	Rank^{#}	Opponent^{#}	Result	Record	Site (attendance) city, state
Non-conference regular season
November 5, 2019*; 7:00 pm		Curry	W 93–29	1–0	Lundholm Gym (222); Durham, NH
November 9, 2019*; 1:00 pm, ESPN3		Holy Cross	W 87–83	2–0	Lundholm Gym (501); Durham, NH
November 12, 2019*; 7:00 pm, FS2		at St. John's	L 61–74	2–1	Carnesecca Arena (3,320); Queens, NY
November 16, 2019*; 4:00 pm, NESN		at Boston University	L 70–84	2–2	Case Gym (819); Boston, MA
November 19, 2019*; 7:00 pm		at Central Connecticut	W 77–63	3–2	William H. Detrick Gymnasium (1,274); New Britain, CT
November 23, 2019*; 2:00 pm		at James Madison	L 71–78	3–3	JMU Convocation Center (2,080); Harrisonburg, VA
November 26, 2019*; 7:00 pm, ESPN3		Bryant	W 87–76 ^{OT}	4–3	Lundholm Gym (422); Durham, NH
November 30, 2019*; 7:00 pm		at FIU	L 69–70	4–4	Ocean Bank Convocation Center (653); Miami, FL
December 4, 2019*; 7:00 pm		Maine Maritime	W 91–37	5–4	Lundholm Gym (293); Durham, NH
December 7, 2019*; 5:00 pm, ESPN+		at Quinnipiac	L 67–75	5–5	People's United Center (1,115); Hamden, CT
December 18, 2019*; 7:00 pm, ESPN+		at Marist	W 64–56	6–5	McCann Arena (912); Poughkeepsie, NY
December 22, 2019*; 1:00 pm		at UConn	L 62–88	6–6	XL Center (9,374); Hartford, CT
December 30, 2019*; 2:00 pm, ESPN+		Dartmouth	W 70–56	7–6	Lundholm Gym (438); Durham, NH
America East Conference regular season
January 4, 2020; 2:00 pm, ESPN+		at Hartford	L 52–61	7–7 (0–1)	Chase Arena at Reich Family Pavilion (770); West Hartford, CT
January 8, 2020; 7:00 pm, ESPN+		Maine	W 57–51	8–7 (1–1)	Lundholm Gym (323); Durham, NH
January 11, 2020; 7:00 pm, ESPN+		at Stony Brook	L 48–73	8–8 (1–2)	Island Federal Credit Union Arena (2,422); Stony Brook, NY
January 15, 2020; 7:00 pm, ESPN3		Albany	L 73–76 ^{OT}	8–9 (1–3)	Lundholm Gym (393); Durham, NH
January 18, 2020; 11:30 am, ESPN+		UMBC	W 65–60	9–9 (2–3)	Lundholm Gym (559); Durham, NH
January 25, 2020; 4:00 pm, ESPN3		at Binghamton	W 77–69	10–9 (3–3)	Binghamton University Events Center (2,804); Vestal, NY
January 29, 2020; 7:00 pm, ESPN+		Vermont	L 43–56	10–10 (3–4)	Lundholm Gym (888); Durham, NH
February 1, 2020; 5:30 pm, ESPN+		at UMass Lowell	L 75–77	10–11 (3–5)	Tsongas Center (2,323); Lowell, MA
February 8, 2020; 12:00 pm, ESPN3		Stony Brook	W 81–64	11–11 (4–5)	Lundholm Gym (599); Durham, NH
February 12, 2020; 7:00 pm, ESPN+		at Vermont	L 50–74	11–12 (4–6)	Patrick Gym (2,899); Burlington, VT
February 15, 2020; 1:00 pm, ESPN+		at UMBC	L 59–65	11–13 (4–7)	UMBC Event Center (2,602); Catonsville, MD
February 20, 2020; 7:00 pm, ESPN+		Hartford	W 67–63 ^{OT}	12–13 (5–7)	Lundholm Gym (530); Durham, NH
February 22, 2020; 7:00 pm, ESPN3		at Albany	W 68–56	13–13 (6–7)	SEFCU Arena (1,925); Albany, NY
February 26, 2020; 7:00 pm, ESPN+		at Maine	W 77–70	14–13 (7–7)	Cross Insurance Center (842); Bangor, ME
February 29, 2020; 1:00 pm, ESPN+		Binghamton	W 89–70	15–13 (8–7)	Lundholm Gym (1,444); Durham, NH
March 3, 2020; 7:00 pm, ESPN+		UMass Lowell	L 54–63	15–14 (8–8)	Lundholm Gym (573); Durham, NH
America East tournament
March 7, 2020; 1:00 pm, ESPN+	(5)	at (4) UMBC; Quarterfinals	L 67–73	15–15	UMBC Event Center; Catonsville, MD
*Non-conference game. ^{#}Rankings from AP Poll. (#) Tournament seedings in parentheses. All times are in Eastern.
