= 2019–20 UMBC Retrievers men's basketball team =

American college basketball season

2019–20 UMBC Retrievers men's basketball
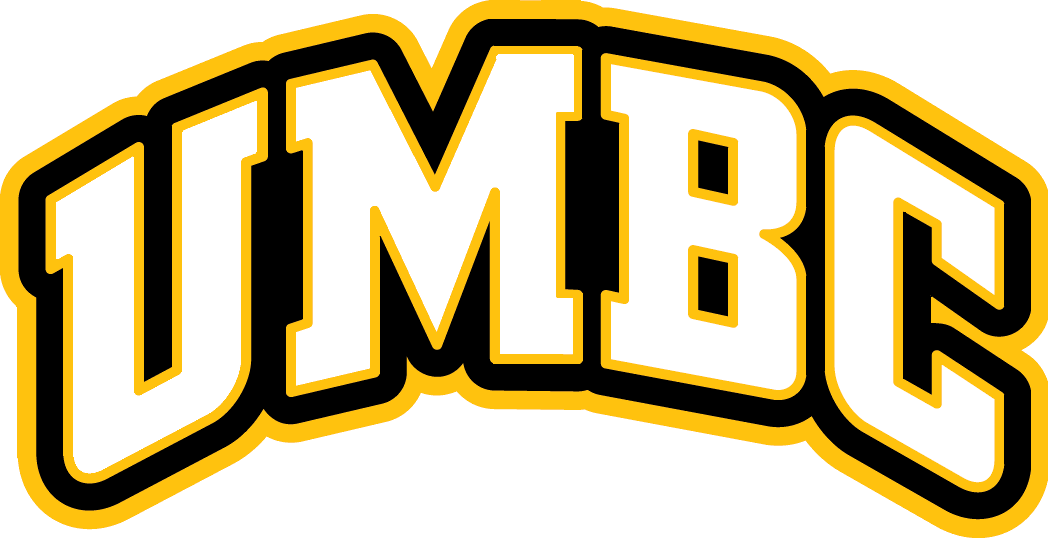
- Conference: America East Conference
- Record: 16–17 (8–8 America East)
- Head coach: Ryan Odom (4th season)
- Assistant coaches: Nate Dixon; Matt Henry; Bryce Crawford
- Home arena: UMBC Event Center

2019–20 America East Conference men's basketball standings
	Conf.				Overall
Team	W		L	PCT	W		L	PCT
Vermont	14	–	2	.875	26	–	7	.788
Stony Brook	10	–	6	.625	20	–	13	.606
Hartford	9	–	7	.563	18	–	15	.545
UMBC	8	–	8	.500	16	–	17	.485
New Hampshire	8	–	8	.500	15	–	15	.500
UMass Lowell	7	–	9	.438	13	–	19	.406
Albany	7	–	9	.438	14	–	18	.438
Maine	5	–	11	.313	9	–	22	.290
Binghamton	4	–	12	.250	10	–	19	.345
Note: The 2020 America East tournament was cancelled prior to the championship game due to the COVID-19 pandemic.

The 2019–20 UMBC Retrievers men's basketball team represented the University of Maryland, Baltimore County in the 2019–20 NCAA Division I men's basketball season. The Retrievers, led by fourth-year head coach Ryan Odom, played their home games at the UMBC Event Center in Catonsville, Maryland as members of the America East Conference. They finished the season 16–17, 8–8 in America East play, to finish in a tie for fourth place. They defeated New Hampshire in the quarterfinals of the America East tournament before losing in the semifinals to Vermont.

== Previous season ==
The Retrievers finished the 2018–19 season 21–13 overall, 11–5 in America East play, to finish in a third place. In the America East tournament, they defeated Albany in the quarterfinals, Hartford in the semifinals, before falling to Vermont in the championship game.

== Roster ==
2019–20 UMBC Retrievers men's basketball team
Players
Coaches

Pos.	#	Name	Height	Weight	Year	Hometown
G	0	Keondre Kennedy	6 ft 6 in (1.98 m)	180 lb (82 kg)	So	Atlanta, GA
G	1	L.J. Owens	6 ft 3 in (1.91 m)	165 lb (75 kg)	So	Annapolis, MD
G	2	Darnell Rogers	5 ft 2 in (1.57 m)	150 lb (68 kg)	Jr	Baltimore, MD
G	3	K. J. Jackson	6 ft 2 in (1.88 m)	180 lb (82 kg)	Sr	Missouri City, TX
G	5	Jack Schwietz	6 ft 5 in (1.96 m)	210 lb (95 kg)	So	Frisco, TX
G	11	R.J. Eytle-Rock	6 ft 3 in (1.91 m)	225 lb (102 kg)	So	London, England
G/F	12	Brandon Horvath	6 ft 10 in (2.08 m)	210 lb (95 kg)	Jr	West River, MD
G	13	Marcel Thompson	6 ft 3 in (1.91 m)	190 lb (86 kg)	Jr	Baltimore, MD
G	22	Ricky II Council	6 ft 5 in (1.96 m)	210 lb (95 kg)	Sr	Durham, NC
G/F	23	Max Curran	6 ft 9 in (2.06 m)	205 lb (93 kg)	Sr	Hooksett, NH
F	25	Nathan Johnson	6 ft 7 in (2.01 m)	205 lb (93 kg)	Fr	Adel, IA
F	30	Daniel Akin	6 ft 9 in (2.06 m)	220 lb (100 kg)	Jr	London, England
F	32	Dimitrije Spasojevic	6 ft 8 in (2.03 m)	240 lb (109 kg)	Jr	Vršac, Serbia
SF	33	Arkel Lamar	6 ft 5 in (1.96 m)	235 lb (107 kg)	Sr	Bridgeport, CT

Head coach

- Ryan Odom (Hampden–Sydney)

Assistant coach(es)

- Nate Dixon (UNC Wilmington)
- Matt Henry (Trinity)
- Bryce Crawford (Ohio State)

Legend

- (C) Team captain
- (S) Suspended
- (I) Ineligible
- (W) Walk-on
- Injured
- Current redshirt

Roster
Last update: August 16, 2024

== Schedule and results ==
Date time, TV	Rank^{#}	Opponent^{#}	Result	Record	Site (attendance) city, state
Non-conference regular season
November 5, 2019*; 7:30 p.m.		Valley Forge	W 134–46	1–0	UMBC Event Center (812); Catonsville, MD
November 9, 2019*; 3:00 p.m., ESPN+		at Florida Gulf Coast	W 65–61	2–0	Alico Arena (3,054); Fort Myers, FL
November 13, 2019*; 12:00 p.m.		St. Mary's (MD); Jamaica Classic campus game	W 79–57	3–0	UMBC Event Center (618); Catonsville, MD
November 16, 2019*; 1:00 p.m.		Georgian Court	W 60–48	4–0	UMBC Event Center (764); Catonsville, MD
November 19, 2019*; 7:00 p.m., SECN		at LSU; Jamaica Classic campus game	L 50–77	4–1	Pete Maravich Assembly Center (8,783); Baton Rouge, LA
November 22, 2019*; 2:00 p.m.		vs. Eastern Michigan; Jamaica Classic	L 45–62	4–2	Montego Bay Convention Center; Montego Bay, Jamaica
November 24, 2019*; 9:00 p.m.		vs. Nicholls; Jamaica Classic	L 72–82	4–3	Montego Bay Convention Center (1,653); Montego Bay, Jamaica
November 30, 2019*; 1:00 p.m., ESPN+		Drexel	W 85–60	5–3	UMBC Event Center (1,308); Catonsville, MD
December 3, 2019*; 7:00 p.m.		at American	L 61–85	5–4	Bender Arena (789); Washington, D.C.
December 7, 2019*; 1:00 p.m.		Saint Francis (PA)	L 60–63	5–5	UMBC Event Center (913); Catonsville, MD
December 10, 2019*; 7:00 p.m.		at Towson	L 71–77	5–6	SECU Arena (1,811); Towson, MD
December 15, 2019*; 7:00 p.m.		Coppin State	W 86–77	6–6	UMBC Event Center (2,164); Catonsville, MD
December 17, 2019*; 6:30 p.m.		at Georgetown	L 55–81	6–7	Capital One Arena (4,088); Washington, D.C.
December 21, 2019*; 4:00 p.m., MASN		at George Mason	L 53–69	6–8	EagleBank Arena (3,458); Fairfax, VA
December 30, 2019*; 1:00 p.m.		Penn State York	W 89–57	7–8	UMBC Event Center (882); Catonsville, MD
America East Conference regular season
January 4, 2020; 1:00 p.m., ESPN+		UMass Lowell	L 73–86 ^{OT}	7–9 (0–1)	UMBC Event Center (1,219); Catonsville, MD
January 8, 2020; 7:00 p.m., ESPN+		at Binghamton	L 75–79	7–10 (0–2)	Binghamton University Events Center (1,413); Vestal, NY
January 11, 2020; 1:00 p.m., ESPN+		Vermont	L 50–74	7–11 (0–3)	UMBC Event Center (2,004); Catonsville, MD
January 18, 2020; 12:00 p.m., ESPN+		at New Hampshire	L 60–65	7–12 (0–4)	Lundholm Gym (559); Durham, NH
January 22, 2020; 7:00 p.m., ESPN+		at Hartford	W 69–60	8–12 (1–4)	Chase Arena at Reich Family Pavilion (1,188); West Hartford, CT
January 25, 2020; 1:00 p.m., ESPN3		Maine	W 63–53	9–12 (2–4)	UMBC Event Center (1,064); Catonsville, MD
January 29, 2020; 7:00 p.m., ESPN+		Albany	L 63–67	9–13 (2–5)	UMBC Event Center (2,381); Catonsville, MD
February 1, 2020; 7:00 p.m., SNY/ESPN+		at Stony Brook	L 63–74	9–14 (2–6)	Island Federal Credit Union Arena (4,009); Stony Brook, NY
February 5, 2020; 7:00 p.m., ESPN+		Hartford	W 70–59	10–14 (3–6)	UMBC Event Center (1,365); Catonsville, MD
February 8, 2020; 4:00 p.m., ESPN3		at UMass Lowell	W 60–50	11–14 (4–6)	Tsongas Center (1,259); Lowell, MA
February 15, 2020; 1:00 p.m., ESPN+		New Hampshire	W 65–59	12–14 (5–6)	UMBC Event Center (2,602); Catonsville, MD
February 20, 2020; 7:00 p.m., ESPN+		at Albany	W 69–50	13–14 (6–6)	SEFCU Arena (1,893); Albany, NY
February 22, 2020; 7:00 p.m., ESPN+		at Vermont	W 66–64	14–14 (7–6)	Patrick Gym (3,266); Burlington, VT
February 26, 2020; 7:00 p.m., ESPN+		Binghamton	L 74–76	14–15 (7–7)	UMBC Event Center (977); Catonsville, MD
February 29, 2020; 1:00 p.m., ESPN+		at Maine	L 48–74	14–16 (7–8)	Cross Insurance Center (912); Bangor, ME
March 3, 2020; 7:00 p.m., ESPN+		Stony Brook	W 75–67	15–16 (8–8)	UMBC Event Center (1,636); Catonsville, MD
America East tournament
March 7, 2020; 1:00 p.m., ESPN+	(4)	(5) New Hampshire; Quarterfinals	W 73–67	16–16	UMBC Event Center; Catonsville, MD
March 10, 2020; 12:00 p.m., ESPN+	(4)	at (1) Vermont; Semifinals	L 74–81	16–17	Patrick Gym (3,266); Burlington, VT
*Non-conference game. ^{#}Rankings from AP poll. (#) Tournament seedings in parentheses. All times are in Eastern.
