= 2019–20 Vermont Catamounts men's basketball team =

American college basketball season

2019–20 Vermont Catamounts men's basketball

America East regular season champions
- Conference: America East Conference
- Record: 26–7 (14–2 America East)
- Head coach: John Becker (9th season)
- Assistant coaches: Kyle Cieplicki; Ryan Schneider; Hamlet Tibbs
- Home arena: Patrick Gym

2019–20 America East Conference men's basketball standings
	Conf.				Overall
Team	W		L	PCT	W		L	PCT
Vermont	14	–	2	.875	26	–	7	.788
Stony Brook	10	–	6	.625	20	–	13	.606
Hartford	9	–	7	.563	18	–	15	.545
UMBC	8	–	8	.500	16	–	17	.485
New Hampshire	8	–	8	.500	15	–	15	.500
UMass Lowell	7	–	9	.438	13	–	19	.406
Albany	7	–	9	.438	14	–	18	.438
Maine	5	–	11	.313	9	–	22	.290
Binghamton	4	–	12	.250	10	–	19	.345
Note: The 2020 America East tournament was cancelled prior to the championship game due to the COVID-19 pandemic.

The 2019–20 Vermont Catamounts men's basketball team represented the University of Vermont in the 2019–20 NCAA Division I men's basketball season. They played their home games at the Patrick Gym in Burlington, Vermont and were led by ninth-year head coach John Becker. They finished the season 26–7, 14–2 in America East play to win the reagular season conference championship. They defeated Maine and UMBC to advance to the championship game of the America East tournament. However, the championship game, along with all other postseason tournaments, were cancelled amid the COVID-19 pandemic.

== Previous season ==
The Catamounts finished the 2018–19 season 27–7, 14–2 in conference play to finish in first place. In the America East tournament, they defeated Maine in the quarterfinals, Binghamton in the semifinals, where they advanced to the championship game against UMBC, in which they won, giving them the conference's automatic bid to the NCAA tournament. As the No. 13 seed in the West region, they lost to No. 4 Florida State 76–69.

== Roster ==
2019–20 Vermont Catamounts men's basketball team
Players
Coaches

Pos.	#	Name	Height	Weight	Year	Previous school	Hometown
G	0	Stef Smith	6 ft 1 in (1.85 m)	170 lb (77 kg)	Jr	Bill Crothers Secondary School	Ajax, Ontario
G	1	Aaron Deloney	6 ft 0 in (1.83 m)	165 lb (75 kg)	Fr	Grant HS	Portland, OR
C	2	Daniel Giddens	6 ft 11 in (2.11 m)	240 lb (109 kg)	GS	Alabama	Mableton, GA
F	3	Anthony Lamb	6 ft 6 in (1.98 m)	227 lb (103 kg)	Sr	Greece Athena HS	Rochester, NY
G	4	Robin Duncan	6 ft 5 in (1.96 m)	190 lb (86 kg)	Fr	Evansville Harrison HS	Evansville, IN
F	5	Duncan Demuth	6 ft 8 in (2.03 m)	210 lb (95 kg)	So	Oklahoma State	Seminole, FL
F	12	Bailey Patella	6 ft 5 in (1.96 m)	185 lb (84 kg)	Jr	Vermont Academy	Lenox, MA
G	13	Justin Mazzulla (redshirt)	6 ft 3 in (1.91 m)	195 lb (88 kg)	Jr	George Washington	Johnston, RI
F	14	Isaiah Powell	6 ft 6 in (1.98 m)	220 lb (100 kg)	So	Colonie Central HS	Albany, NY
F	15	Nick Fiorillo (W) (redshirt)	6 ft 7 in (2.01 m)	210 lb (95 kg)	Fr	Scarborough HS	Scarborough, ME
G	20	Eric Beckett	6 ft 4 in (1.93 m)	225 lb (102 kg)	Fr	Tilton School	Ajax, Ontario
G	21	Everett Duncan	6 ft 6 in (1.98 m)	190 lb (86 kg)	RS Sr	Evansville Harrison HS	Evansville, IN
G	24	Ben Shungu	6 ft 2 in (1.88 m)	200 lb (91 kg)	RS Jr	Rice Memorial HS	Burlington, VT
G	25	Kevin Garrison (W)	6 ft 0 in (1.83 m)	180 lb (82 kg)	So	Burlington HS	Burlington, VT
F	32	Josh Speidel	6 ft 7 in (2.01 m)	210 lb (95 kg)	Sr	Columbus North HS	Columbus, IN
F	35	Ryan Davis	6 ft 8 in (2.03 m)	250 lb (113 kg)	So	James B. Conant HS	Schaumburg, IL
G	55	Deng Adiang (W)	5 ft 10 in (1.78 m)	160 lb (73 kg)	Fr	Vermont Academy	Jericho, VT
G		Skyler Nash	6 ft 6 in (1.98 m)	215 lb (98 kg)	RS So	Gould Academy	Chicago, IL

Head coach

- John Becker (Catholic)

Assistant coach(es)

- Kyle Cieplicki (Vermont)
- Ryan Schneider (Marist)
- Hamlet Tibbs (West Virginia)

Legend

- (C) Team captain
- (S) Suspended
- (I) Ineligible
- (W) Walk-on
- Injured
- Current redshirt

Roster
Last update: September 15, 2019

== Schedule and results ==
Date time, TV	Rank^{#}	Opponent^{#}	Result	Record	Site (attendance) city, state
Exhibition
October 26, 2019*; 7:00 pm		Brown	W 70–59		Patrick Gym (3,228); Burlington, VT
November 3, 2019*; 4:00 pm		Saint Michael's	W 84–48		Patrick Gym (2,838); Burlington, VT
Non-conference regular season
November 8, 2019*; 7:00 pm, ESPN+		at St. Bonaventure	W 61–59	1–0	Reilly Center (4,489); St. Bonaventure, NY
November 10, 2019*; 2:00 pm		at Bucknell	W 66–63	2–0	Sojka Pavilion (2,321); Lewisburg, PA
November 13, 2019*; 7:00 pm, ESPN+		Boston University	W 62–47	3–0	Patrick Gym (1,463); Burlington, VT
November 16, 2019*; 4:00 pm, FS2		at St. John's; Hall of Fame Tip Off campus-site game	W 70–68	4–0	Carnesecca Arena (4,054); Queens, NY
November 19, 2019*; 7:00 pm, ACCNX		at No. 7 Virginia; Hall of Fame Tip Off campus-site game	L 55–61	4–1	John Paul Jones Arena (13,913); Charlottesville, VA
November 23, 2019*; 7:30 pm, ESPN3		vs. Central Connecticut; Hall of Fame Tip Off Springfield semifinals	W 81–49	5–1	Mohegan Sun Arena (7,862); Uncasville, CT
November 24, 2019*; 8:30 pm, ESPN3		vs. Rider; Hall of Fame Tip Off Springfield championship	L 67–72	5–2	Mohegan Sun Arena (5,822); Uncasville, CT
November 27, 2019*; 7:00 pm, ESPN3		Gallaudet	W 93–44	6–2	Patrick Gym (2,819); Burlington, VT
December 1, 2019*; 2:00 pm, ESPN+		at Yale	L 52–65	6–3	John J. Lee Amphitheater (812); New Haven, CT
December 3, 2019*; 7:00 pm, CBSSN		at Cincinnati	L 73–82	6–4	Fifth Third Arena (10,220); Cincinnati, OH
December 7, 2019*; 7:00 pm, ESPN3		Towson	W 55–38	7–4	Patrick Gym (2,970); Burlington, VT
December 18, 2019*; 7:00 pm		UNC Greensboro	L 53–54	7–5	Patrick Gym (2,592); Burlington, VT
December 20, 2019*; 7:00 pm, ESPN+		Lipscomb	W 86–63	8–5	Patrick Gym (2,641); Burlington, VT
December 31, 2019*; 2:00 pm, ESPN+		George Washington	W 76–51	9–5	Patrick Gym (3,228); Burlington, VT
January 2, 2020*; 7:00 pm, ESPN+		at Dartmouth	W 77–68	10–5	Leede Arena (1,800); Hanover, NH
America East Conference regular season
January 8, 2020; 7:00 pm, ESPN+		Stony Brook	L 77–81	10–6 (0–1)	Patrick Gym (2,847); Burlington, VT
January 11, 2020; 1:00 pm, ESPN+		at UMBC	W 74–50	11–6 (1–1)	UMBC Event Center (2,004); Baltimore, MD
January 15, 2020; 7:00 pm, ESPN+		at Binghamton	W 72–53	12–6 (2–1)	Binghamton University Events Center (1,556); Vestal, NY
January 18, 2020; 2:00 pm, ESPN+		Hartford	W 74–57	13–6 (3–1)	Patrick Gym (3,266); Burlington, VT
January 22, 2020; 7:00 pm, ESPN+		at Maine	W 59–57	14–6 (4–1)	Cross Insurance Center (929); Bangor, ME
January 25, 2020; 7:00 pm, ESPN+		UMass Lowell	W 92–62	15–6 (5–1)	Patrick Gym (3,228); Burlington, VT
January 29, 2020; 7:00 pm, ESPN+		at New Hampshire	W 56–43	16–6 (6–1)	Lundholm Gym (888); Durham, NH
February 1, 2020; 7:00 pm, ESPN3		at Albany	W 86–75	17–6 (7–1)	SEFCU Arena (4,219); Albany, NY
February 5, 2020; 7:00 pm, ESPN+		Maine	W 77–52	18–6 (8–1)	Patrick Gym (2,901); Burlington, VT
February 8, 2020; 7:00 pm, ESPN+		at Hartford	W 69–68	19–6 (9–1)	Chase Arena at Reich Family Pavilion (1,734); West Hartford, CT
February 12, 2020; 7:00 pm, ESPN+		New Hampshire	W 74–50	20–6 (10–1)	Patrick Gym (2,899); Burlington, VT
February 15, 2020; 2:00 pm, ESPN+		Binghamton	W 76–48	21–6 (11–1)	Patrick Gym (3,266); Burlington, VT
February 20, 2020; 7:00 pm, ESPN+		at Stony Brook	W 63–54	22–6 (12–1)	Island Federal Credit Union Arena (4,009); Stony Brook, NY
February 22, 2020; 7:00 pm, ESPN+		UMBC	L 64−66	22−7 (12−2)	Patrick Gym (3,266); Burlington, VT
February 29, 2020; 5:00 pm, ESPN+		at UMass Lowell	W 94–77	23–7 (13–2)	Tsongas Center (2,821); Lowell, MA
March 3, 2020; 7:00 pm, ESPN+		Albany	W 85–62	24–7 (14–2)	Patrick Gym; Burlington, VT
America East tournament
March 7, 2020; 7:00 pm, ESPN+	(1)	(8) Maine; Quarterfinals	W 61–50	25–7	Patrick Gym (3,266); Burlington, VT
March 10, 2020; 12:00 pm, ESPN+	(1)	(4) UMBC; Semifinals	W 81–74	26–7	Patrick Gym (3,266); Burlington, VT
March 14, 2020; 11:00 am, ESPN2	(1)	(3) Hartford; Championship	Cancelled due to the COVID-19 pandemic		Patrick Gym; Burlington, VT
*Non-conference game. ^{#}Rankings from AP Poll. (#) Tournament seedings in parentheses. All times are in Eastern.
