= 2020 America East men's basketball tournament =

- Classification: Division I
- Season: 2019–20
- Teams: 8
- Site: Campus sites
- Television: ESPN+ ESPN2

2019–20 America East Conference men's basketball standings
	Conf.				Overall
Team	W		L	PCT	W		L	PCT
Vermont	14	–	2	.875	26	–	7	.788
Stony Brook	10	–	6	.625	20	–	13	.606
Hartford	9	–	7	.563	18	–	15	.545
UMBC	8	–	8	.500	16	–	17	.485
New Hampshire	8	–	8	.500	15	–	15	.500
UMass Lowell	7	–	9	.438	13	–	19	.406
Albany	7	–	9	.438	14	–	18	.438
Maine	5	–	11	.313	9	–	22	.290
Binghamton	4	–	12	.250	10	–	19	.345
Note: The 2020 America East tournament was cancelled prior to the championship game due to the COVID-19 pandemic.

The 2020 America East men's basketball tournament was the postseason men's basketball tournament for the America East Conference, which was held on March 7, 10, and canceled before its scheduled conclusion on March 14, 2020. All tournament games were played on home arenas of the higher-seeded school. The winner would have received the conference's automatic bid to the NCAA tournament, which itself was also cancelled to help curtail the spread of COVID-19.

== Seeds ==
The top eight teams in the conference standings qualify for the tournament. The teams are seeded by record in conference, with a tiebreaker system to seed teams with identical conference records.

Seed	School	AEC Record	Tiebreaker
1	Vermont	14–2	
2	Stony Brook	10–6	
3	Hartford	9–7	
4	UMBC	8–8	1–1 vs Vermont
5	New Hampshire	8–8	0–2 vs Vermont
6	UMass Lowell	7–9	1–1 vs Hartford
7	Albany	7–9	0–2 vs Hartford
8	Maine	5–11	
DNQ	Binghamton	4–12	

== Schedule ==
Game	Time	Matchup	Score	Television	Attendance
Quarterfinals – Saturday, March 7
1	1:00 pm	No. 5 New Hampshire at No. 4 UMBC	67–73	ESPN+	1,034
2	5:00 pm	No. 6 UMass Lowell at No. 3 Hartford	75–89	ESPN+	1,069
3	7:00 pm	No. 7 Albany at No. 2 Stony Brook	73–76	ESPN+	2,166
4	7:00 pm	No. 8 Maine at No. 1 Vermont	50–61	ESPN+	3,266
Semifinals – Tuesday, March 10
5	7:00 pm	No. 3 Hartford at No. 2 Stony Brook	64–58	ESPN+	4,000
6	7:00 pm	No. 4 UMBC at No. 1 Vermont	74–81	ESPN+	2,367
Championship – Saturday, March 14
7	11:00 am	No. 3 Hartford at No. 1 Vermont	65-64	ESPN+	5,650
Game times in ET. Rankings denote tournament seeding. All games hosted by higher-seeded team.

== Bracket and results ==
Teams are reseeded after each round with the highest remaining seeds receiving home-court advantage.

Quarterfinals; Saturday, March 7, 2020; ESPN3
1	Vermont	61
8	Maine	50
4	UMBC	73
5	New Hampshire	67
(Pairings are reseeded after the first round)
2	Stony Brook	76
7	Albany	73
3	Hartford	89
6	UMass Lowell	75

Semifinals; Tuesday, March 10, 2020; ESPN3
1	Vermont	81
4	UMBC	74
2	Stony Brook	58
3	Hartford	64

Championship; Saturday, March 14, 2020; ESPN2
1	Vermont
3	Hartford

== Game summaries ==
=== Quarterfinals ===
ESPN+

March 7
1:00 PM

Report

#4 UMBC 73, #5 New Hampshire 67
Scoring by half: 32-31, 41-36
Pts: Jackson (20); Rebs: Akin (7); Asts: Jackson (2)	Pts: Sutherlin (19); Rebs: Sutherlin (13); Asts: Sutherlin (5)

UMBC Event Center
Baltimore, MD
Attendance: Unknown
Referees: Mike Kitts, Robert Riley, John Floyd

ESPN+

March 7
5:00 PM

Report

#3 Hartford 89, #6 UMass-Lowell 75
Scoring by half: 38-38, 51-37
Pts: Ellison (26); Rebs: Carter (6); Asts: Carter (6)	Pts: Tied (23); Rebs: Withers (8); Asts: Gantz (3)

Chase Arena
West Hartford, CT
Attendance: 1,069
Referees: Donnie Eppley, Brandon Cruz, Lewis Garrison

ESPN+

March 7
7:00 PM

Report

#2 Stony Brook 76, #7 Albany 73
Scoring by half: 30-28, 46-45
Pts: Foreman (23); Rebs: Gueye (7); Asts: Tied (3)	Pts: Healy (28); Rebs: Tied (6); Asts: Clark (6)

Island FCU Arena
Stony Brook, NY
Attendance: 2,166
Referees: Kevin O'Connell, Alfred Smith, Edwin Young

ESPN+

March 7
7:00 PM

Report

#1 Vermont 61, #8 Maine 50
Scoring by half: 35-26, 26-24
Pts: Tied (19); Rebs: Davis (8); Asts: Duncan (4)	Pts: Prijovic (18); Rebs: Ingo (14); Asts: El Darwich (7)

Patrick Gymnasium
Burlington, VT
Attendance: 3,266
Referees: Bill McCarthy, Andy O'Brien, Michael Palau

=== Semifinals ===
ESPN+

March 10
7:00 PM

Report

#2 Stony Brook 58, #3 Hartford 64
Scoring by half: 19-31, 33-39
Pts: Olaniyi (19); Rebs: Olaniyi (9); Asts: Gueye (4)	Pts: Marks (17); Rebs: Flowers (7); Asts: Carter (7)

Island FCU Arena
Stony Brook, NY
Attendance: 1,861
Referees: Larry Scirotto, Robert Riley, Bill McCarthy

ESPN+

March 10
7:00 PM

Report

#1 Vermont 81, #4 UMBC 74
Scoring by half: 39-34, 42-40
Pts: Duncan (26); Rebs: Smith (8); Asts: Tied (3)	Pts: Eytle-Rock (31); Rebs: Horvath (8); Asts: Jackson (5)

Patrick Gymnasium
Burlington, VT
Attendance: 3,266
Referees: John Garbinski, Courtney Green, Edwin Young

== See also ==
- 2020 America East women's basketball tournament
