= 2019–20 Albany Great Danes men's basketball team =

American college basketball season

2019–20 Albany Great Danes men's basketball
- Conference: America East Conference
- Record: 14–18 (7–9 America East)
- Head coach: Will Brown (19th season)
- Assistant coaches: Jon Iati; Josh Pelletier; Jerrad Knotts
- Home arena: SEFCU Arena

2019–20 America East Conference men's basketball standings
	Conf.				Overall
Team	W		L	PCT	W		L	PCT
Vermont	14	–	2	.875	26	–	7	.788
Stony Brook	10	–	6	.625	20	–	13	.606
Hartford	9	–	7	.563	18	–	15	.545
UMBC	8	–	8	.500	16	–	17	.485
New Hampshire	8	–	8	.500	15	–	15	.500
UMass Lowell	7	–	9	.438	13	–	19	.406
Albany	7	–	9	.438	14	–	18	.438
Maine	5	–	11	.313	9	–	22	.290
Binghamton	4	–	12	.250	10	–	19	.345
Note: The 2020 America East tournament was cancelled prior to the championship game due to the COVID-19 pandemic.

The 2019–20 Albany Great Danes men's basketball team represented University at Albany, SUNY in the 2019–20 NCAA Division I men's basketball season. They played their home games at the SEFCU Arena in Albany, New York and are led by 19th-year head coach Will Brown. They finished the season 14–18, 7–9 in America East play to finish in seventh place. They lost in the quarterfinals of the America East tournament to Stony Brook.

== Previous season ==
The Great Danes finished the 2018–19 season 12–20, 7–9 in America East Conference play to finish in sixth place. In the America East tournament, they were defeated by UMBC in the quarterfinals.

== Roster ==
2019–20 Albany Great Danes men's basketball team
Players
Coaches

Pos.	#	Name	Height	Weight	Year	Previous school	Hometown
G	0	Antonio Rizzuto	6 ft 3 in (1.91 m)	195 lb (88 kg)	So	Northeastern HS	York, PA
F	1	Malachi De Sousa	6 ft 6 in (1.98 m)	200 lb (91 kg)	Fr	South Kent School	Beacon, NY
G/F	2	Trey Hutcheson	6 ft 5 in (1.96 m)	195 lb (88 kg)	Fr	Linn-Mar HS	Marion, IA
G	3	JoJo Anderson	6 ft 3 in (1.91 m)	190 lb (86 kg)	RS Jr	22ft Academy	Houston, TX
G	4	Ahmad Clark	6 ft 1 in (1.85 m)	175 lb (79 kg)	Jr	DeMatha Catholic HS	Bowie, MD
F	10	Brent Hank	6 ft 10 in (2.08 m)	265 lb (120 kg)	RS So	Trinity College Senior	Port Lincoln, Australia
G	11	Cameron Healy	6 ft 3 in (1.91 m)	190 lb (86 kg)	RS So	Montverde Academy	Sydney, Australia
F	12	Mitch Doherty	6 ft 7 in (2.01 m)	235 lb (107 kg)	Fr	Worcester Academy	Acton, MA
F	14	Adam Lulka	6 ft 8 in (2.03 m)	245 lb (111 kg)	RS So	The King's School	Sydney, Australia
G	22	Nick Fruscio	5 ft 10 in (1.78 m)	170 lb (77 kg)	Sr	Albany Academy	Albany, NY
G/F	23	Sam Shafer	6 ft 6 in (1.98 m)	200 lb (91 kg)	RS Fr	Lincoln-Way East HS	Frankfort, IL
F	32	Romani Hansen	6 ft 8 in (2.03 m)	200 lb (91 kg)	Sr	Mt. St. Michael Academy	U.S. Virgin Islands
F	33	Sasha French	6 ft 11 in (2.11 m)	235 lb (107 kg)	RS Jr	Hun School of Princeton	Napa, CA
F	54	Kendall Lauderdale	6 ft 8 in (2.03 m)	245 lb (111 kg)	Sr	La Mirada HS	Fullerton, CA

Head coach

- Will Brown (Dowling)

Assistant coach(es)

- Jon Iati (Albany)
- Josh Pelletier (Saint Rose)
- Jerrad Knotts (Albany)

Legend

- (C) Team captain
- (S) Suspended
- (I) Ineligible
- (W) Walk-on
- Injured
- Current redshirt

Roster
Last update: September 4, 2019

== Schedule and results ==
Date time, TV	Rank^{#}	Opponent^{#}	Result	Record	Site (attendance) city, state
Non-conference regular season
November 9, 2019*; 7:00 pm		Lehigh	L 70–74	0–1	SEFCU Arena (2,039); Albany, NY
November 13, 2019*; 7:00 pm		Canisius	W 83–57	1–1	SEFCU Arena (1,808); Albany, NY
November 16, 2019*; 7:00 pm		at Manhattan	L 51–57	1–2	Draddy Gymnasium (1,029); Bronx, NY
November 19, 2019*; 7:00 pm		SUNY Potsdam	W 78–52	2–2	SEFCU Arena (2,124); Albany, NY
November 22, 2019*; 7:30 pm		at Quinnipiac; Bobcats Invitational	L 69–86	2–3	People's United Center (890); Hamden, CT
November 23, 2019*; 4:00 pm		vs. Sacred Heart; Bobcats Invitational	W 72–65	3–3	People's United Center (154); Hamden, CT
November 24, 2019*; 1:00 pm		vs. Presbyterian; Bobcats Invitational	W 65–60	4–3	People's United Center; Hamden, CT
November 30, 2019*; 10:00 am		American	W 68–64	5–3	SEFCU Arena (1,506); Albany, NY
December 4, 2019*; 7:30 pm		Yale	L 52–61	5–4	SEFCU Arena (2,337); Albany, NY
December 7, 2019*; 7:00 pm		at Bucknell	L 64–65	5–5	Sojka Pavilion (2,059); Lewisburg, PA
December 10, 2019*; 7:00 p.m., ACCNX		at Boston College	L 51–72	5–6	Conte Forum (3,874); Chestnut Hill, MA
December 14, 2019*; 5:00 pm		Niagara	W 84–80	6–6	SEFCU Arena (1,776); Albany, NY
December 18, 2019*; 8:30 pm		at St. John's	L 57–85	6–7	Carnesecca Arena (2,963); Queens, NY
December 21, 2019*; 2:00 pm, ESPN+		at Monmouth	L 70–72	6–8	OceanFirst Bank Center (1,669); West Long Branch, NJ
December 30, 2019*; 7:00 pm, ESPN+		at Columbia	W 67–66	7–8	Levien Gymnasium (1,395); New York, NY
America East Conference regular season
January 4, 2020; 4:00 pm, ESPN3		at Binghamton	W 74–62	8–8 (1–0)	Binghamton University Events Center (3,035); Vestal, NY
January 11, 2020; 3:00 pm, ESPN3		Maine	W 76–70	9–8 (2–0)	SEFCU Arena (1,885); Albany, NY
January 15, 2020; 7:00 pm, ESPN3		at New Hampshire	W 76–73 ^{OT}	10–8 (3–0)	Lundholm Gym (393); Durham, NH
January 18, 2020; 7:00 pm, ESPN+		at Stony Brook	L 62–70	10–9 (3–1)	Island Federal Credit Union Arena (2,763); Stony Brook, NY
January 22, 2020; 7:00 pm, ESPN+		UMass Lowell	W 101–75	11–9 (4–1)	SEFCU Arena (2,055); Albany, NY
January 25, 2020; 3:00 pm, ESPN3		Hartford	L 48–62	11–10 (4–2)	SEFCU Arena (2,402); Albany, NY
January 29, 2020; 7:00 pm, ESPN+		at UMBC	W 67–63	12–10 (5–2)	UMBC Event Center (2,381); Baltimore, MD
February 1, 2020; 7:00 pm, ESPN3		Vermont	L 75–86	12–11 (5–3)	SEFCU Arena (4,219); Albany, NY
February 5, 2020; 7:00 pm, ESPN+		Binghamton	W 62–49	13–11 (6–3)	SEFCU Arena (1,739); Albany, NY
February 12, 2020; 7:00 pm, ESPN3		at Hartford	L 60–66	13–12 (6–4)	Chase Arena at Reich Family Pavilion (951); West Hartford, CT
February 16, 2020; 1:00 pm, ESPN+		at Maine	W 66–60	14–12 (7–4)	Cross Insurance Center (1,149); Bangor, ME
February 20, 2020; 7:00 pm, ESPN+		UMBC	L 50–69	14–13 (7–5)	SEFCU Arena (1,893); Albany, NY
February 22, 2020; 7:00 pm, ESPN3		New Hampshire	L 56–68	14–14 (7–6)	SEFCU Arena (1,925); Albany, NY
February 26, 2020; 7:00 pm, ESPN+		at UMass Lowell	L 69–88	14–15 (7–7)	Tsongas Center (819); Lowell, MA
February 29, 2020; 7:00 pm, ESPN3		Stony Brook	L 49–52	14–16 (7–8)	SEFCU Arena (2,564); Albany, NY
March 3, 2020; 7:00 pm, ESPN+		at Vermont	L 62–85	14–17 (7–9)	Patrick Gym; Burlington, VT
America East tournament
March 7, 2020; 7:00 pm, ESPN+	(7)	at (2) Stony Brook; Quarterfinals	L 73–76	14–18	Island Federal Credit Union Arena (2,166); Stony Brook, NY
*Non-conference game. ^{#}Rankings from AP Poll. (#) Tournament seedings in parentheses. All times are in Eastern.
