= 2018–19 America East Conference men's basketball season =

2018–19 America East Conference Men's Basketball Season
- League: NCAA Division I
- Sport: Basketball
- Teams: 9
- TV partner(s): ESPN+, ESPNU, ESPN3, Regional Networks

2018–19 NCAA Division I men's basketball season
- Regular Season Champions: Vermont
- Runners-up: Stony Brook
- Season MVP: Anthony Lamb - Vermont
- Top scorer: Anthony Lamb - Vermont

America East Conference tournament
- Champions: Vermont
- Runners-up: UMBC
- Finals MVP: Anthony Lamb - Vermont

America East Conference Basketball seasons
- ← 2017–18 19–20 →

2018–19 America East Conference men's basketball standings
	Conf.				Overall
Team	W		L	PCT	W		L	PCT
Vermont †	14	–	2	.875	27	–	7	.794
Stony Brook	12	–	4	.750	24	–	9	.727
UMBC	11	–	5	.688	21	–	13	.618
Hartford	10	–	6	.625	18	–	15	.545
UMass Lowell	7	–	9	.438	15	–	17	.469
Albany	7	–	9	.438	12	–	20	.375
Binghamton	5	–	11	.313	10	–	23	.303
Maine	3	–	13	.188	5	–	27	.156
New Hampshire	3	–	13	.188	5	–	24	.172
† 2019 America East tournament winner

The 2018–19 America East Conference men's basketball season will begin with practices in October 2018, followed by the start of the 2018–19 NCAA Division I men's basketball season in November. Regular season conference play began in December 2018 and concluded in March 2019. The 2019 America East Conference tournament will be held from March 9–16, 2019. The Vermont Catamounts won their 3rd consecutive outright regular season championship, under the guidance of John Becker, who also received his third consecutive America East Coach of the Year Award, and fourth in total.

== Head coaches ==
=== Coaching changes ===
- Bob Walsh did not have his contract extended as head coach of Maine and was replaced by Richard Barron.

=== Coaches ===
Team	Head coach	Previous job	Years at school	Record at school	America East record	America East titles	NCAA Tournaments
Albany	Will Brown	Albany (assistant)	18	294-267	154-135	2	5
Binghamton	Tommy Dempsey	Rider	7	56-160	25-96	0	0
Hartford	John Gallagher	Penn (assistant)	9	123-162	63-69	0	0
Maine	Richard Barron	Maine (women's)	1	5-26	3-13	0	0
New Hampshire	Bill Herrion	East Carolina	13	172-251	97-134	0	0
Stony Brook	Jeff Boals	Ohio State (assistant)	3	55–40	31–17	0	0
UMass Lowell	Pat Duquette	Northeastern (assistant)	6	71-107	46-60	0	0
UMBC	Ryan Odom	Lenoir-Rhyne	3	65-36	27-13	0	1
Vermont	John Becker	Vermont (assistant)	8	190-83	107-21	4	2

Notes:

- Year at school includes 2018–19 season.
- Overall and America East records are from time at current school and are through the end the 2018–19 season.
- NCAA Tournament appearances are from time at current school only.

== Preseason ==
=== Preseason poll ===
Rank	Team
1	Vermont (6)
2	Hartford (3)
3	UMBC
T4	Albany
T4	Stony Brook
6	Binghamton
T7	Maine
T7	New Hampshire
9	UMass Lowell

() first place votes

=== Preseason All-Conference Teams ===
Award	Recipients
All-Conference Team	John Carroll (Hartford); Ernie Duncan (Vermont); Jason Dunne (Hartford); Anthony Lamb (Vermont); Akwasi Yeboah (Stony Brook)

America East Preseason Player of the Year: Anthony Lamb (Vermont)

== Regular season ==
=== Conference matrix ===
This table summarizes the head-to-head results between teams in conference play. Each team will play 16 conference games, and at least 1 against each opponent.

	Albany	Binghamton	Hartford	Maine	New Hampshire	Stony Brook	UMass Lowell	UMBC	Vermont
vs. Albany	–	0-2	1–1	1–1	1–1	1-1	2-0	1–1	2–0
vs. Binghamton	2-0	–	2–0	0-2	0–2	2–0	1-1	2–0	2–0
vs. Hartford	1–1	0–2	–	0–2	0–2	2-0	1-1	0-2	2-0
vs. Maine	1–1	2-0	2–0	–	1–1	2-0	1-1	2–0	2-0
vs. New Hampshire	1–1	2–0	2–0	1-1	–	2–0	1–1	2–0	2-0
vs. Stony Brook	1–1	0–2	0–2	0-2	0–2	–	0–2	1–1	2-0
vs. UMass Lowell	0–2	1–1	1–1	1-1	1–1	2–0	–	1-1	2-0
vs. UMBC	1–1	0–2	2–0	0–2	0–2	1–1	1-1	–	0–2
vs. Vermont	0–2	0–2	0-2	0-2	0-2	0-2	0–2	2–0	–
Total	7-9	5-11	10-6	3-13	3-13	12-4	7-9	11-5	14-2

=== Player of the week ===
Throughout the conference regular season, the America East Conference offices named one or two Players of the week and one or two Rookies of the week.

Week	Player of the week	Rookie of the week	Reference
1 – Nov. 12	Akwasi Yeboah – Stony Brook	Sam Sessoms – Binghamton	
2 – Nov. 19	Akwasi Yeboah (2) – Stony Brook	Alex Rivera – UMass Lowell	
2 – Nov. 19	Anthony Lamb – Vermont	Alex Rivera – UMass Lowell	
3 – Nov. 26	Andrew Garcia – Stony Brook	Sam Sessoms (2) – Binghamton	
4 – Dec. 3	Akwasi Yeboah (3) – Stony Brook	Cameron Healy – Albany	
4 – Dec. 3	Jason Dunne – Hartford	Cameron Healy – Albany	
5 – Dec. 10	Anthony Lamb (2) – Vermont	Sam Sessoms (3) – Binghamton	
6 – Dec. 17	George Blagojevic – Hartford	Miles Latimer – Stony Brook	
7 – Dec. 25	Christian Lutete – UMass Lowell	Sam Sessoms (4) – Binghamton	
7 – Dec. 25	Anthony Lamb (3) – Vermont	Sam Sessoms (4) – Binghamton	
8 – Dec. 31	Christian Lutete (2) – UMass Lowell	Jules Moor – Stony Brook	
8 – Dec. 31	Andrew Garcia (2) – Stony Brook	Jules Moor – Stony Brook	
9 – Jan. 7	J.R. Lynch – Hartford	Sam Sessoms (5) – Binghamton	
9 – Jan. 7	Anthony Lamb (4) – Vermont	Sam Sessoms (5) – Binghamton	
10 – Jan. 14	Anthony Lamb (5) – Vermont	Robin Duncan – Vermont	
11 – Jan. 21	Christian Lutete (2) – UMass Lowell	Josh Placer – UMBC	
12 – Jan. 28	Caleb Stewart – Binghamton	Antonio Rizzuto – Albany	
13 – Feb. 4	Andrew Fleming – Maine	Cameron Healy (2) – Albany	
14 – Feb. 11	Anthony Lamb (6) – Vermont	Sam Sessoms (6) – Binghamton	
15 – Feb. 18	Anthony Lamb (7) – Vermont	Adam Lulka – Albany	
16 – Feb. 25	Akwasi Yeboah (4) – Stony Brook	Cameron Healy (3) – Albany	
17 – Mar. 4	George Blagojevic (2) – Hartford	Sam Sessoms (7) – Binghamton	

=== Statistics leaders ===
Category	Player	Games played	Totals	Average
Points Per Game	Anthony Lamb (Vermont)	28	582	20.8
Rebounds Per Game	Anthony Lamb (Vermont)	28	224	8.0
Assists Per Game	Ahmad Clark (Albany)	31	134	4.3
Steals Per Game	K.J. Jackson (UMBC)	31	69	2.2
Blocks Per Game	Jeff Otchere (Stony Brook)	31	73	2.4
Field Goal %	George Blagojevic (Hartford)	30	173–314	.551
3-Point %	Ernie Duncan (Vermont)	28	69–162	.426
Free Throw %	Cameron Healy (Albany)	31	75-84	.893

== Final standings ==
Team	W	L	Win %
Vermont	14	2	.875
Stony Brook	12	4	.750
UMBC	11	5	.688
Hartford	10	6	.625
UMass Lowell	7	9	.438
Albany	7	9	.438
Binghamton	5	11	.313
Maine	3	13	.188
New Hampshire	3	13	.188

== Postseason ==
=== America East tournament ===
Quarterfinals; Saturday, March 9, 2018; ESPN+
1	Vermont	73
8	Maine	57
4	Hartford	78
5	UMass Lowell	70
(Pairings are reseeded after the first round)
2	Stony Brook	72
7	Binghamton	78
3	UMBC	62
6	Albany	54

Semifinals; Tuesday, March 12, 2018; ESPN+
1	Vermont	84
7	Binghamton	51
3	UMBC	90**
4	Hartford	84

Championship; Saturday, March 16, 2018; ESPN2
1	Vermont	66
3	UMBC	49

=== NCAA Tournament ===
Seed	Region	School	First Four	1st Round	2nd Round	Sweet 16	Elite Eight	Final Four	Championship
13	West	Vermont	N/A	eliminated by (4) Florida State, 69-76					

=== National Invitation Tournament ===
Seed	Bracket	School	1st Round	2nd Round	Quarterfinals	Semifinals	Championship

== Awards ==
=== All-Americans ===
Consensus All-Americans
First Team	Second Team	Third Team

To earn "consensus" status, a player must win honors based on a point system computed from the four different all-America teams. The point system consists of three points for first team, two points for second team and one point for third team. No honorable mention or fourth team or lower are used in the computation. The top five totals plus ties are first team and the next five plus ties are second team.

Associated Press	NABC	Sporting News	USBWA
First Team
Second Team
Third Team

=== America East Awards ===
2019 America East Men's Basketball Individual Awards
Award	Recipient(s)
America East Player of the Year	Anthony Lamb, F., Vermont
Coach of the Year	John Becker, Vermont
Defensive Player of the Year	Jeff Otchere, C., Stony Brook
Rookie of the Year	Sam Sessoms, G., Binghamton
Sixth Man Award	Andrew Garcia, G/F., Stony Brook

2019 America East Men's Basketball All-Conference Teams
First Team	Second Team	Third Team
Anthony Lamb, Jr., F., Vermont †; J.R. Lynch, Sr., G., Hartford; Ernie Duncan, Sr., G., Vermont; Joe Sherburne, Sr., F., UMBC; Akwasi Yeboah, Jr., F., Stony Brook	George Blagojevic, Sr., F., Hartford; Andrew Fleming, Jr., F., Maine; K. J. Jackson, Jr., G., UMBC; John Carroll, Sr., F., Hartford; Christian Lutete, Jr., G., UMass Lowell	Ahmad Clark, Jr., G., Albany; Jason Dunne, Sr., G., Hartford; Cameron Healy, R-Fr., G., Albany; Elijah Olaniyi, So., G., Stony Brook; Sam Sessoms, Fr., G., Binghamton
† - denotes unanimous selection

== Attendance ==
Team	Arena	Capacity	Game 1	Game 2	Game 3	Game 4	Game 5	Game 6	Game 7	Game 8	Game 9	Game 10	Total	Average	% of Capacity
Team	Arena	Capacity	Game 11	Game 12	Game 13	Game 14	Game 15	Game 16	Game 17	Game 18	Game 19	Game 20	Total	Average	% of Capacity
Albany	SEFCU Arena	4,553	2,579	1,659	1,614	1,902	1,740	1,412	2,733	1,793	2,316	2,085	29,466	2,105	46%
Albany	SEFCU Arena	4,553	3,891	1,876	2,306	1,560							29,466	2,105	46%
Binghamton	Binghamton University Events Center	5,322	2,108	2,509	1,577	1,827	1,501	2,748	1,527	1,624	2,142	4,710	34,683	2,168	41%
Binghamton	Binghamton University Events Center	5,322	2,452	1,683	2,001	2,546	1,564	2,164					34,683	2,168	41%
Hartford	Chase Arena at Reich Family Pavilion	4,017	1,269	543	732	1,179	802	559	549	734	595	864	10,907	839	21%
Hartford	Chase Arena at Reich Family Pavilion	4,017	1,202	1,458	964								10,907	839	21%
Maine	Cross Insurance Center	5,800	1,113	1,036	1,025	1,084	995	918	929	1,026	1,195	989	12,109	1,009	17%
Maine	Cross Insurance Center	5,800	981	818									12,109	1,009	17%
New Hampshire	Lundholm Gym	3,500	343	227	237	327	577	493	340	415	604	283	5,362	383	11%
New Hampshire	Lundholm Gym	3,500	547	397	239	333							5,362	383	11%
Stony Brook	Island Federal Credit Union Arena	4,160	2,449	3,123	2,475	2,435	2,539	2,647	2,817	4,009	3,153	3,658	38,541	2,965	71%
Stony Brook	Island Federal Credit Union Arena	4,160	3,210	3,236	2,790								38,541	2,965	71%
UMass Lowell	Costello Athletic Center & Tsongas Center	2,100 & 6,003	1,078	617	1,152	1,428	706	652	3,118	411	1,232	2,378	4,216 & 12,201	602 & 2,034	29% & 34%
UMass Lowell	Costello Athletic Center & Tsongas Center	2,100 & 6,003	451	301	2,893								4,216 & 12,201	602 & 2,034	29% & 34%
UMBC	UMBC Event Center	5,000	1,083	1,164	1,037	2,476	1,204	805	1,328	1,081	915	1,659	24,001	1,600	32%
UMBC	UMBC Event Center	5,000	2,260	1,888	2,688	2,411	2,002						24,001	1,600	32%
Vermont	Patrick Gym	3,266	2,053	2,582	2,446	2,959	2,629	2,389	2,542	3,266	2,812	2,540	39,860	2,645	81%
Vermont	Patrick Gym	3,266	2,472	3,116	2,152	3,266	2,546						39,860	2,645	81%

== See also ==
- 2018–19 NCAA Division I men's basketball season
- America East Conference
