= 2018–19 Albany Great Danes men's basketball team =

American college basketball season

2018–19 Albany Great Danes men's basketball
- Conference: America East Conference
- Record: 12–20 (7–9 America East)
- Head coach: Will Brown (18th season)
- Assistant coaches: Jon Iati; Josh Pelletier; Jerrad Knotts
- Home arena: SEFCU Arena

2018–19 America East Conference men's basketball standings
	Conf.				Overall
Team	W		L	PCT	W		L	PCT
Vermont †	14	–	2	.875	27	–	7	.794
Stony Brook	12	–	4	.750	24	–	9	.727
UMBC	11	–	5	.688	21	–	13	.618
Hartford	10	–	6	.625	18	–	15	.545
UMass Lowell	7	–	9	.438	15	–	17	.469
Albany	7	–	9	.438	12	–	20	.375
Binghamton	5	–	11	.313	10	–	23	.303
Maine	3	–	13	.188	5	–	27	.156
New Hampshire	3	–	13	.188	5	–	24	.172
† 2019 America East tournament winner

The 2018–19 Albany Great Danes men's basketball team represented University at Albany, SUNY in the 2018–19 NCAA Division I men's basketball season. They were led by 18th-year head coach Will Brown and played their home games at the SEFCU Arena in Albany, New York. They were members of the America East Conference.

They finished the season 12–20, 7–9 in America East play, to finish in a tie for fifth place. They lost in the quarterfinals of the America East tournament to UMBC.

== Previous season ==
The Great Danes finished the 2017–18 season 22–10, 10–6 in America East play, to finish in fourth place. In the America East tournament, they were defeated by Stony Brook in the quarterfinals. Despite finishing with 22 wins, they opted to not play in a postseason tournament.

== Roster ==
2018–19 Albany Great Danes men's basketball team
Players
Coaches

Pos.	#	Name	Height	Weight	Year	Previous school	Hometown
G	0	Antonio Rizzuto	6 ft 3 in (1.91 m)	195 lb (88 kg)	Fr	Northeastern HS	York, PA
F	1	Malachi De Sousa	6 ft 6 in (1.98 m)	200 lb (91 kg)	Fr	South Kent School	Beacon, NY
G	2	Ahmad Clark	6 ft 1 in (1.85 m)	175 lb (79 kg)	Jr	DeMatha Catholic HS	Bowie, MD
G	3	Rayshawn Miller	6 ft 1 in (1.85 m)	190 lb (86 kg)	Sr	Boston Latin Academy	Boston, MA
G	4	Reece Brooks	5 ft 9 in (1.75 m)	150 lb (68 kg)	Jr	Elite 1 Academy	Brampton, ON
F	10	Brent Hank	6 ft 10 in (2.08 m)	265 lb (120 kg)	RS Fr	Trinity College Senior	Port Lincoln, Australia
G	11	Cameron Healy	6 ft 3 in (1.91 m)	190 lb (86 kg)	RS Fr	Montverde Academy	Sydney, Australia
F	12	Devonte Campbell	6 ft 6 in (1.98 m)	235 lb (107 kg)	Sr	Culver Academy	Vaughan, ON
F	14	Adam Lulka	6 ft 8 in (2.03 m)	245 lb (111 kg)	RS Fr	The King's School	Sydney, Australia
G	21	Jeremiah Starks	6 ft 2 in (1.88 m)	190 lb (86 kg)	RS So	Peachtree Ridge HS	Suwanee, GA
G	22	Nick Fruscio	5 ft 10 in (1.78 m)	170 lb (77 kg)	Jr	Albany Academy	Albany, NY
G/F	23	Philip Flory	6 ft 5 in (1.96 m)	190 lb (86 kg)	So	Oshkosh North HS	Oshkosh, WI
F	32	Nikola Jerotic	6 ft 7 in (2.01 m)	210 lb (95 kg)	Fr	N/A	Belgrade, Serbia
F	33	Sasha French	6 ft 11 in (2.11 m)	235 lb (107 kg)	RS So	Hun School of Princeton	Napa, CA
F	54	Kendall Lauderdale	6 ft 8 in (2.03 m)	245 lb (111 kg)	Jr	La Mirada HS	Fullerton, CA

Head coach

- Will Brown (Dowling)

Assistant coach(es)

- Jon Iati (Albany)
- Josh Pelletier (Saint Rose)
- Jerrad Knotts (Albany)

Legend

- (C) Team captain
- (S) Suspended
- (I) Ineligible
- (W) Walk-on
- Injured
- Current redshirt

Roster
Last update: July 26, 2025

== Schedule and results ==
Date time, TV	Rank^{#}	Opponent^{#}	Result	Record	Site (attendance) city, state
Non-conference regular season
November 9, 2018*; 8:00 p.m., ESPN3		at Iona	L 68–72	0–1	Hynes Athletic Center (1,871); New Rochelle, NY
November 14, 2018*; 7:30 p.m., ESPN+		Boston University	L 61–71	0–2	SEFCU Arena (2,579); Albany, NY
November 17, 2018*; 3:30 p.m., ESPN3		at Canisius	W 75–66	1–2	Koessler Athletic Center (1,540); Buffalo, NY
November 19, 2018*; 7:00 p.m., ESPN3		Oneonta	W 79–62	2–2	SEFCU Arena (1,659); Albany, NY
November 20, 2018*; 7:00 p.m., ESPN+		Holy Cross	L 65–69	2–3	SEFCU Arena (1,614); Albany, NY
November 23, 2018*; 8:00 p.m., ESPN+		at Milwaukee; Basketball Hall of Fame Belfast Classic campus game	L 70–79	2–4	UW–Milwaukee Panther Arena (952); Milwaukee, WI
November 29, 2018*; 2:00 p.m., CBSSN		vs. LIU Brooklyn; Basketball Hall of Fame Belfast Classic semifinals	L 77–80	2–5	SSE Arena; Belfast, Northern Ireland
November 30, 2018*; 2:30 p.m., CBSSN		vs. Dartmouth; Basketball Hall of Fame Belfast Classic third-place game	L 77–91	2–6	SSE Arena; Belfast, Northern Ireland
December 8, 2018*; 7:00 p.m.		Monmouth	W 82–63	3–6	SEFCU Arena (1,902); Albany, NY
December 11, 2018*; 7:00 p.m., ESPN+		at Yale	L 63–71	3–7	John J. Lee Amphitheater (904); New Haven, CT
December 15, 2018*; 3:00 p.m., ESPN+		Dartmouth	L 52–61	3–8	SEFCU Arena (1,740); Albany, NY
December 18, 2018*; 7:00 p.m., FSN		at Providence	L 43–73	3–9	Dunkin' Donuts Center (4,855); Providence, RI
December 20, 2018*; 7:00 p.m., ESPN+		Manhattan	W 77–67	4–9	SEFCU Arena (1,412); Albany, NY
December 28, 2018*; 7:00 p.m., ESPN+		at Kent State	L 68–70	4–10	MAC Center (2,114); Kent, OH
December 31, 2018*; 3:30 p.m.		at Niagara	W 79–74	5–10	Gallagher Center (829); Lewiston, NY
America East Conference regular season
January 5, 2019; 7:00 p.m., ESPN3		Vermont	L 51–80	5–11 (0–1)	SEFCU Arena (2,733); Albany, NY
January 12, 2019; 3:00 p.m., ESPN+		Maine	L 62–66	5–12 (0–2)	SEFCU Arena (1,793); Albany, NY
January 16, 2019; 7:00 p.m., ESPN3		at UMass Lowell	L 72–84	5–13 (0–3)	Costello Athletic Center (411); Lowell, MA
January 19, 2019; 1:00 p.m., ESPN3		at UMBC	L 64–65 ^{OT}	5–14 (0–4)	UMBC Event Center (1,659); Baltimore, MD
January 23, 2019; 7:00 p.m., ESPN3		Stony Brook	L 66–67 ^{OT}	5–15 (0–5)	SEFCU Arena (2,316); Albany, NY
January 26, 2019; 3:00 p.m., ESPN+		Hartford	W 84–77	6–15 (1–5)	SEFCU Arena (2,085); Albany, NY
January 30, 2019; 7:00 p.m., ESPN+		at New Hampshire	W 62–42	7–15 (2–5)	Lundholm Gym (283); Durham, NH
February 2, 2019; 7:00 p.m., ESPN+		Binghamton	W 64–50	8–15 (3–5)	SEFCU Arena (3,891); Albany, NY
February 9, 2019; 2:00 p.m., ESPN3		Vermont	L 49–67	8–16 (3–6)	SEFCU Arena (3,116); Albany, NY
February 13, 2019; 7:00 p.m., ESPN3		UMass Lowell	L 54–86	8–17 (3–7)	SEFCU Arena (1,876); Albany, NY
February 17, 2019; 1:00 p.m., ESPN3		at Maine	W 63–54	9–17 (4–7)	Cross Insurance Center (989); Bangor, ME
February 21, 2019; 7:00 p.m.		at Stony Brook	W 74–70	10–17 (5–7)	Island Federal Credit Union Arena (3,210); Stony Brook, NY
February 23, 2019; 7:00 p.m., ESPN3		UMBC	W 84–75	11–17 (6–7)	SEFCU Arena (2,306); Albany, NY
February 27, 2019; 7:00 p.m., ESPN+		New Hampshire	L 58–62	11–18 (6–8)	SEFCU Arena (1,560); Albany, NY
March 2, 2019; 5:00 p.m., ESPN+		at Hartford	L 80–82 ^{OT}	11–19 (6–9)	Chase Arena at Reich Family Pavilion (1,458); West Hartford, CT
March 5, 2019; 7:00 p.m., ESPN+		at Binghamton	W 73–58	12–19 (7–9)	Binghamton University Events Center (2,164); Vestal, NY
America East tournament
March 9, 2019; 1:00 p.m., ESPN3	(6)	at (3) UMBC; Quarterfinals	L 54–62	12–20	UMBC Event Center (2,766); Baltimore, MD
*Non-conference game. ^{#}Rankings from AP poll. (#) Tournament seedings in parentheses. All times are in Eastern.
