= John Becker (basketball) =

American college basketball coach (born 1968)

Current position
- Title: Head coach
- Team: Vermont
- Conference: America East
- Record: 354–147 (.707)

Biographical details
- Born: April 16, 1968 (age 58); Fairfield, Connecticut, U.S.
- Education: Catholic University ('90)

Coaching career (HC unless noted)
- 1994–1997: Gallaudet (assistant)
- 1997–1999: Gallaudet
- 2004–2006: Catholic (assistant)
- 2006–2011: Vermont (assistant)
- 2011–present: Vermont

Head coaching record
- Overall: 360–191 (.653)
- Tournaments: 1–5 (NCAA Division I); 0–2 (NIT); 4–3 (CBI)

Accomplishments and honors

Championships
- 6 America East tournament (2012, 2017, 2019, 2022–2024); 9 America East regular season (2014, 2017–2024)

Awards
- 7× America East Coach of the Year (2014, 2017–2020, 2022, 2024)

John Becker (born April 17, 1968) is an American college basketball coach, currently the head coach of the Vermont Catamounts of the America East Conference. He replaced Mike Lonergan, who left to become the coach at George Washington University.

On January 5, 2023, Becker became the winningest coach in Vermont history, with a 74–64 win over Bryant, surpassing Tom Brennan.

== Coaching career ==
=== Gallaudet/Catholic University ===
Becker's college coaching career began in 1994 when he became an assistant at Gallaudet University in Washington D.C. In 1997, Becker was elevated to head coach of the Bison, where he served from 1997 to 1999. Becker also served as the men's tennis coach, despite never playing the game, and also worked in the information technology field, as the coaching positions were part-time. He briefly left coaching to pursue a master's degree in information systems at George Washington University, however in 2004 Becker returned to coaching at his alma mater Catholic as an assistant coach under Steve Howes. While at Catholic, he helped guide the team to a 41–17 record, which included a 21–7 mark and NCAA Division III Tournament appearance in 2005–06. His first year with Catholic saw the Cardinals go 20–10 and advance to the Capital Athletic Conference Championship game.

=== Vermont ===
In 2006–07, Becker joined the Vermont staff as director of basketball operations, serving in the role for two seasons before being promoted to assistant coach. As an assistant, UVM earned three postseason berths, including the 2010 NCAA Tournament. On May 10, 2011, Becker was named interim head coach of the Catamounts while search was conducted. On May 20, 2011, Vermont lifted the interim tag and named Becker the 16th coach in Vermont basketball history.

==== 2011–12 ====
In his first year in charge of the Catamounts, Becker led Vermont to a second-place finish in the America East Conference with a 24–12 overall record and 13–3 mark in conference, winning the America East Championship for Vermont's fifth NCAA Tournament bid in nine years, defeating Stony Brook 51–43. Becker became just the second first-year head coach since Northeastern's Karl Fogel to win the conference tournament. He also set a Vermont record for most wins by a first-year head coach, breaking a 90-year-old record set by Tom Keady in the 1921–22 season with a 73–63 win on the road over Maine. In its NCAA first round match up the Catamounts picked up their second-ever NCAA Tournament win, defeating Lamar 71–59 before falling to top-seeded North Carolina 77–58 in the second round.

==== 2012–13 ====
The 2012–13 season saw Vermont post another 20-win season, coupled with an appearance in the America East Championship game. Becker became just the second coach in league history to post back-to-back 20-win seasons in his first two seasons, along with two-straight appearances in the title game, joining Pat Chambers. The Catamounts were defeated at home by Albany 53–49, and elected to participate in the 2013 College Basketball Invitational, where it fell to Santa Clara 77–66 in the first round.

==== 2013–14 ====
In his third season with the Catamounts, Becker guided Vermont to a 15–1 mark and an America East regular season championship. The 20-win season made Becker the first coach in America East history to post three-straight 20-win seasons in his first three seasons, and it was the 11th time in the last 13 seasons UVM eclipsed the 20-win mark. Despite this, Vermont was defeated by fourth-seeded Albany, 67–58, in the America East Championship semifinals. By virtue of winning the regular season, the Catamounts earned an automatic berth in the 2014 NIT.

==== 2014–15 ====
With nine freshman and sophomores on the roster, Vermont earned its seventh-straight 20 win season, and the 12th out of the last 14 years. Becker became the only coach in Vermont and America East history to win 20 games each of his first four years. Finishing second in the America East regular season, the Catamounts fell at home in the semifinals of the America East playoffs, and accepted a bid to the 2015 College Basketball Invitational. It was UVM's seventh-straight postseason appearance, and with wins over Hofstra in the opening round and Radford in the quarterfinals, the Catamounts earned their second and third CBI wins before falling to Louisiana-Monroe in the semifinals.

==== 2015–16 ====
After a 6–5 start to America East play, Vermont went on an eight-game win streak to reach the finals of the 2016 America East Conference tournament championship game, where it fell 80–74 to Stony Brook. Becker guided the Catamounts to its fifth-straight 20-win season, and a bid to the 2016 College Basketball Invitational where the Catamounts made its second-straight semifinal appearance. It marked eight years in a row that UVM has participated in a postseason tournament. On January 27, 2016, Becker picked up his 100th overall victory at Vermont, with a 66–50 win over the New Hampshire. The feat was accomplished in 158 games, which ties Mike Lonergan for fastest to reach 100 wins by a UVM coach.

==== 2016–17 ====
Becker guided the Catamounts to a historic season, setting a program record for wins, and a perfect 16–0 mark in America East play, marking only the third time in league history that a team completed the regular season undefeated. For his coaching efforts, Becker earned his second America East Coach of the Year award, while Catamount players swept all major conference awards. Becker also moved into third all-time in wins at UVM. Vermont continued its run in the 2017 America East men's basketball tournament, capturing its sixth conference tournament title to earn a berth in the 2017 NCAA tournament. As a 13-seed with the longest win streak in the country at 21-straight heading into the tournament, the Catamounts faced fourth-seeded Purdue in the first round, falling 80–70 and finishing with an overall record of 29–6.

==== 2017–18 ====
With reigning America East Player of the Year Trae Bell-Haynes and nine other returnees, the Catamounts continued its run of form in America East play earning its ninth conference regular season championship and second-straight America East regular season crown, going 15–1 in conference, with its only loss coming to Hartford on February 18, 2018, snapping a run of 31 straight wins against America East opponents, and a 15-game win streak. Becker once again was awarded America East Coach of the Year honors, sharing the award with Hartford's John Gallagher. Vermont reached the America East Championship game for the third time in as many years, falling at home to future NCAA Tournament darling UMBC 65–62. As the conference's regular season champion, the Catamounts participated in the 2018 NIT where as a six seed, Vermont faced Middle Tennessee, and was defeated 91–64 to finish the season 27–8. The 27 wins is tied for second-most in school history, behind the 2016–17 campaign's 29 wins.

==== 2018–19 ====
During the 2018–19 season, Becker guided the Catamounts to its third-straight America East regular season championship and its seventh overall America East tournament championship. For the fourth time, Becker was also named America East Coach of the Year. The Catamounts drew a 13-seed in the first round of the 2019 NCAA tournament and were defeated by Florida State 76–69 to finish the season 27–7.

On February 2, 2019, the Catamounts' 74–65 win over UMass Lowell marked Becker's 100th win in conference play. He set a new America East record as the fastest head coach to reach 100 conference wins, doing so in his 120th conference game, tying Kansas' Bill Self for fourth on the all-time list for NCAA Division I men's basketball. The only other men's coaches in Division I (and its predecessors) to reach the milestone in fewer conference games are Mark Few (112 games with Gonzaga), Adolph Rupp (116 with Kentucky), and John Chaney (118 with Temple). At the close of the season, Becker was named the USBWA district I coach of the year for the third consecutive season.

==== 2019–20 ====
With the return of reigning America East Player of the year Anthony Lamb, Becker guided the Catamounts to its fourth-straight outright regular season title, which set a league record while also earning his record fifth America East Coach of the Year award. He would lead Vermont to a 26–7 overall record, including a win over St. John's for the team's first win over a Big East opponent in its current formation. He also earned his 200th career win at Vermont with a 55–38 win over Towson on December 7, 2019. The Catamounts would reach the America East tournament final for fifth-straight season, but the title game was canceled due to the COVID-19 pandemic. UVM was awarded the tournament championship as the highest seed remaining.

==== 2020–21 ====
The Catamounts only played a conference schedule due to COVID-19, finishing with at 10–4 regular season record and a share of the America East regular season title for the filth year in a row. Becker also coached the America East Player of the Year for the fifth season in a row as Ryan Davis was named the conference's top performer. As the two seed in the 2021 America East tournament, the Catamounts secured a bye to the semifinals, where they were upset by fourth-seeded Hartford 71–65.

==== 2021–22 ====
Becker guided the Catamounts to a 28–6 overall mark, the second-most wins in school history, which included a 17–1 America East record as Vermont won both the regular season and tournament titles. Once again, Becker coached America East Player of the Year Ryan Davis while earning his record sixth America East Coach of the Year honor. In the first round of the 2022 NCAA tournament, Vermont lost to Arkansas 75–71.

==== 2022–23 ====
With a 23–11 overall record, which included a 74–64 win versus Bryant on January 5, 2023, to become Vermont's all-time leader in career wins, passing Tom Brennan. Vermont earned both conference regular season title and tournament titles for the fourth time under Becker, en route to its second-straight appearance in the NCAA tournament. Becker also coached the conference's Player of the Year, Finn Sullivan, making it seven-straight years a Catamount earned the league's top honor. As a 15-seed, Vermont faced off against Marquette, falling 78–61.

==== 2023–24 ====
Notching a 28–7 mark, the Catamounts earned their third-straight conference tournament crown, defeating UMass Lowell, marking the second three-peat in program history. Becker earned his 300th career win at Vermont in a 70–54 win over New Hampshire. As a 13-seed in the 2024 NCAA Tournament, the Catamounts faced off against Duke, losing 64–47.

==== 2024–25 ====
With a 21–12 record, Vermont finished in second place in the America East, failing to win at least a share of the regular season title for the first time since the 2015–16 season. The Catamounts fell to Maine in the 2025 America East tournament semifinals.

==== 2025–26 ====
With America East Player of the Year TJ Hurley, Becker guided Vermont to a 22–12 record and second-place finish in the America East. The Catamounts would fall to regular-season champion UMBC in the 2026 America East men's basketball tournament championship game, 74–59.

== Head coaching record ==
Record table
Season	Team	Overall	Conference	Standing	Postseason
Gallaudet Bison (Capital Athletic Conference) (1997–1999)
1997–98	Gallaudet	3–22	1–13	8th	
1998–99	Gallaudet	3–22	1–13	8th	
Gallaudet:		6–44 (.120)	2–26 (.071)		
Vermont Catamounts (America East Conference) (2011–present)
2011–12	Vermont	24–12	13–3	2nd	NCAA Division I Round of 64
2012–13	Vermont	21–12	11–5	2nd	CBI First Round
2013–14	Vermont	22–11	15–1	1st	NIT First Round
2014–15	Vermont	20–14	12–4	T–2nd	CBI Semifinals
2015–16	Vermont	23–14	11–5	T–3rd	CBI Semifinals
2016–17	Vermont	29–6	16–0	1st	NCAA Division I Round of 64
2017–18	Vermont	27–8	15–1	1st	NIT First Round
2018–19	Vermont	27–7	14–2	1st	NCAA Division I Round of 64
2019–20	Vermont	26–7	14–2	1st	Postseason cancelled due to COVID-19
2020–21	Vermont	10–5	10–4	T–1st	
2021–22	Vermont	28–6	17–1	1st	NCAA Division I Round of 64
2022–23	Vermont	23–11	14–2	1st	NCAA Division I Round of 64
2023–24	Vermont	28–7	15–1	1st	NCAA Division I Round of 64
2024–25	Vermont	21–12	13–3	2nd	
2025–26	Vermont	22–12	12–4	2nd	
2026–27	Vermont	3–3	0–0		
Vermont:		354–147 (.707)	202–38 (.842)		
Total:		360–191 (.653)			
National champion Postseason invitational champion Conference regular season champion Conference regular season and conference tournament champion Division regular season champion Division regular season and conference tournament champion Conference tournament champion
