= 2018–19 Stony Brook Seawolves men's basketball team =

American college basketball season

2018–19 Stony Brook Seawolves men's basketball

CBI, First round
- Conference: America East Conference
- Record: 24–9 (12–4 America East)
- Head coach: Jeff Boals (3rd season)
- Assistant coaches: Geno Ford; Bryan Weber; Lamar Thornton
- Home arena: Island Federal Credit Union Arena

2018–19 America East Conference men's basketball standings
	Conf.				Overall
Team	W		L	PCT	W		L	PCT
Vermont †	14	–	2	.875	27	–	7	.794
Stony Brook	12	–	4	.750	24	–	9	.727
UMBC	11	–	5	.688	21	–	13	.618
Hartford	10	–	6	.625	18	–	15	.545
UMass Lowell	7	–	9	.438	15	–	17	.469
Albany	7	–	9	.438	12	–	20	.375
Binghamton	5	–	11	.313	10	–	23	.303
Maine	3	–	13	.188	5	–	27	.156
New Hampshire	3	–	13	.188	5	–	24	.172
† 2019 America East tournament winner

The 2018–19 Stony Brook Seawolves men's basketball team represented Stony Brook University in the 2018–19 NCAA Division I men's basketball season. They played their home games at the Island Federal Credit Union Arena in Stony Brook, New York and were led by third-year head coach Jeff Boals. The team won 24 regular season games, a school record as a Division I program, including a nation-leading 13 road wins and received the No. 2 seed in the America East tournament. However, they lost in the quarterfinals to Binghamton.

On March 17, 2019, Boals left the school to accept the head coaching position at his alma mater, Ohio. Assistant coach Geno Ford was named interim head coach of the team in the College Basketball Invitational tournament.

== Previous season ==
The Seawolves finished the 2017–18 season 13–19, 7–9 in the America East Conference play to finish in fifth place. In the America East tournament, they upset Albany on the road before losing to Vermont in the semifinals. Freshman Elijah Olaniyi was named America East Rookie of the Year, while sophomore Akwasi Yeboah was named All-America East Second Team.

== Roster ==
2018–19 Stony Brook Seawolves men's basketball team
Players
Coaches

Pos.	#	Name	Height	Weight	Year	Previous school	Hometown
G	0	Jaron Cornish	5 ft 11 in (1.8 m)	178 lb (81 kg)	Sr	Champagnat Catholic School	Abaco, Bahamas
G	1	Jules Moor	6 ft 5 in (1.96 m)	202 lb (92 kg)	Fr	Hargrave Military Academy	Houston, TX
G	2	Miles Latimer	6 ft 3 in (1.91 m)	192 lb (87 kg)	Fr	Paul VI Catholic HS	Fairfax, VA
G/F	3	Elijah Olaniyi	6 ft 5 in (1.96 m)	203 lb (92 kg)	So	Newark East Side HS	Newark, NJ
C	4	Jeff Otchere	6 ft 11 in (2.11 m)	240 lb (109 kg)	So	Christopher Columbus HS	Bronx, NY
G	5	Corry Long	6 ft 2 in (1.88 m)	180 lb (82 kg)	So	Hughes STEM HS	Cincinnati, OH
G	10	Jordan McKenzie	6 ft 1 in (1.85 m)	189 lb (86 kg)	So	Hargrave Military Academy	Concord, NC
G	11	Hassan Ceesay	6 ft 4 in (1.93 m)	189 lb (86 kg)	Fr	Newark East Side HS	Newark, NJ
G	12	Makale Foreman	6 ft 1 in (1.85 m)	200 lb (91 kg)	Jr	Hargrave Military Academy	Kingsport, TN
G/F	15	Akwasi Yeboah	6 ft 6 in (1.98 m)	235 lb (107 kg)	RS Jr	Barking Abbey School	Chigwell, England
C	21	Alex Christie	7 ft 0 in (2.13 m)	269 lb (122 kg)	Fr	The MacDuffie School	Oakville, Ontario
G/F	23	Andrew Garcia	6 ft 5 in (1.96 m)	228 lb (103 kg)	RS So	The Master's School (CT)	Harlem, NY
F	35	Anthony Ochefu	6 ft 8 in (2.03 m)	245 lb (111 kg)	So	Westtown School	West Chester, PA
F	42	Nick Aubry	6 ft 7 in (2.01 m)	240 lb (109 kg)	Fr	Chaminade High School	Port Jefferson, NY

Head coach

- Jeff Boals (Ohio)

Assistant coach(es)

- Geno Ford (Ohio)
- Bryan Weber (Akron)
- Lamar Thornton (Ohio Dominican)

Legend

- (C) Team captain
- (S) Suspended
- (I) Ineligible
- (W) Walk-on
- Injured
- Current redshirt

Roster
Last update: November 11, 2018

== Season ==
In their season opener at George Washington, Stony Brook fell behind 22–0 but rallied all the way back to force overtime and win, 77–74 in one of the largest comebacks in NCAA Division I history. The Seawolves then upset South Carolina to win their first game against an SEC opponent in program history. Stony Brook started 6–1 for the first time as a Division I program. Stony Brook won 12 non-conference games, a new school record as a Division I program. The team's seven true road wins led the nation.

In the America East regular season, the Seawolves began 5–0 in conference play, including a comeback against Maine that came after an 18–point deficit. They lost control of first place in the America East after a 72–53 defeat against Vermont at home. The conference regular-season title was on the line in Stony Brook's second matchup at Vermont in March, and after falling down by 13, a 20–2 Stony Brook run gave them the lead only to fall by a final score of 50–56. A 68–63 road victory at Hartford secured the No. 2 seed in the America East tournament for Stony Brook; a loss would have dropped them to fourth place.

In the quarterfinals of the America East tournament, Stony Brook played seventh-seeded Binghamton. In a stunning upset, the Seawolves fell down by 24 points in the second half but would have cut the deficit to one after a Jaron Cornish layup and foul. However, the call was reversed to an offensive foul, sending the deficit back to four and sending Stony Brook home in an improbable loss.

The Seawolves were invited to the 2019 College Basketball Invitational, where they travelled to Tampa to play South Florida. Although Stony Brook had a 25-point lead in the first half (48–23), they collapsed down the stretch and ultimately lost, 82–79, in overtime.

== Schedule and results ==
Date time, TV	Rank^{#}	Opponent^{#}	Result	Record	Site (attendance) city, state
Non-conference regular season
November 6, 2018*; 7:02 pm, ESPN+		at George Washington; Hall of Fame Tip Off campus game	W 77–74 ^{OT}	1–0	Charles E. Smith Center (3,188); Washington, D.C.
November 9, 2018*; 7:00 pm, SECN+		at South Carolina; Hall of Fame Tip Off campus game	W 83–81	2–0	Colonial Life Arena (9,657); Columbia, SC
November 16, 2018*; 6:00 pm, ESPN3		vs. Holy Cross; Hall of Fame Tip Off semifinals	L 70–84	2–1	Mohegan Sun Arena; Uncasville, CT
November 17, 2018*; 8:30 pm, ESPN3		vs. Norfolk State; Hall of Fame Tip Off	W 72–65	3–1	Mohegan Sun Arena; Uncasville, CT
November 21, 2018*; 6:00 pm, ESPN3		Molloy	W 97–61	4–1	Island Federal Credit Union Arena (2,449); Stony Brook, NY
November 24, 2018*; 2:00 pm, ESPN+		at Rhode Island	W 68–58	5–1	Ryan Center (5,016); Kingston, RI
November 27, 2018*; 7:00 pm, ESPN+		at Norfolk State	W 79–73	6–1	Joseph G. Echols Memorial Hall (1,712); Norfolk, VA
December 1, 2018*; 7:00 pm, ESPN3		Quinnipiac	W 71–61	7–1	Island Federal Credit Union Arena (3,123); Stony Brook, NY
December 5, 2018*; 7:00 pm		at Manhattan	W 69–62	8–1	Draddy Gymnasium (862); Bronx, NY
December 8, 2018*; 2:00 pm, ESPN+		at Brown	L 69–71	8–2	Pizzitola Sports Center (1,137); Providence, RI
December 12, 2018*; 7:00 pm, ESPN3		LIU Brooklyn	W 83–79	9–2	Island Federal Credit Union Arena (2,475); Stony Brook, NY
December 16, 2018*; 2:00 pm, ESPN+		Delaware	W 74–68	10–2	Island Federal Credit Union Arena (2,435); Stony Brook, NY
December 19, 2018*; 7:00 pm, ESPN+		Hofstra	L 64–71	10–3	Island Federal Credit Union Arena (2,539); Stony Brook, NY
December 22, 2018*; 2:00 pm, ESPN3		at Quinnipiac	W 76–73	11–3	People's United Center (828); Hamden, CT
December 29, 2018*; 8:00 pm, ESPN3		at Northern Iowa	W 73–63	12–3	McLeod Center (3,262); Cedar Falls, IA
America East regular season
January 5, 2019; 1:00 pm, ESPN+		at UMass Lowell	W 75–63	13–3 (1–0)	Costello Athletic Center (652); Lowell, MA
January 9, 2019; 7:00 pm, ESPN3		Binghamton	W 59–46	14–3 (2–0)	Island Federal Credit Union Arena (2,647); Stony Brook, NY
January 12, 2019; 7:00 pm, ESPN+		New Hampshire	W 62–44	15–3 (3–0)	Island Federal Credit Union Arena (2,817); Stony Brook, NY
January 19, 2019; 1:00 pm, ESPN3		at Maine	W 64–61	16–3 (4–0)	Cross Insurance Center (929); Bangor, ME
January 23, 2019; 7:00 pm, ESPN3		at Albany	W 67–66 ^{OT}	17–3 (5–0)	SEFCU Arena (2,316); Albany, NY
January 26, 2019; 7:00 pm, ESPN3		Vermont	L 52–73	17–4 (5–1)	Island Federal Credit Union Arena (4,009); Stony Brook, NY
January 30, 2019; 7:00 pm, ESPN+		at UMBC	L 49–57	17–5 (5–2)	UMBC Event Center (2,260); Baltimore, MD
February 2, 2019; 7:00 pm, ESPN+		Hartford	W 86–77	18–5 (6–2)	Island Federal Credit Union Arena (3,153); Stony Brook, NY
February 6, 2019; 7:00 pm, ESPN3		at Binghamton	W 85–59	19–5 (7–2)	Binghamton University Events Center (1,683); Vestal, NY
February 9, 2019; 7:00 pm, ESPN+		UMass Lowell	W 76–65	20–5 (8–2)	Island Federal Credit Union Arena (3,658); Stony Brook, NY
February 16, 2019; 1:00 pm, ESPN3		at New Hampshire	W 64–62	21–5 (9–2)	Lundholm Gym (397); Durham, NH
February 21, 2019; 7:00 pm, ESPN+		Albany	L 70–74	21–6 (9–3)	Island Federal Credit Union Arena (3,210); Stony Brook, NY
February 23, 2019; 7:00 pm, ESPN3		Maine	W 81–53	22–6 (10–3)	Island Federal Credit Union Arena (3,236); Stony Brook, NY
February 27, 2019; 7:00 pm, ESPN+		UMBC	W 78–63	23–6 (11–3)	Island Federal Credit Union Arena (2,790); Stony Brook, NY
March 2, 2019; 7:00 pm, ESPN+		at Vermont	L 50–56	23–7 (11–4)	Patrick Gym (3,266); Burlington, VT
March 5, 2019; 7:00 pm, ESPN+		at Hartford	W 68–63	24–7 (12–4)	Chase Arena at Reich Family Pavilion (964); West Hartford, CT
America East tournament
March 9, 2019; 7:00 pm, ESPN3	(2)	(7) Binghamton; Quarterfinal	L 72–78	24–8	Island Federal Credit Union Arena (3,108); Stony Brook, NY
College Basketball Invitational
March 20, 2019*; 7:00 pm		at South Florida; First round	L 79–82 ^{OT}	24–9	Yuengling Center (1,705); Tampa, FL
*Non-conference game. ^{#}Rankings from AP Poll. (#) Tournament seedings in parentheses. All times are in Eastern.
