= 2018–19 Vermont Catamounts men's basketball team =

American college basketball season

2018–19 Vermont Catamounts men's basketball

America East regular season and tournament champions

NCAA tournament, First Round
- Conference: America East Conference
- Record: 27–7 (14–2 America East)
- Head coach: John Becker (8th season)
- Assistant coaches: Kyle Cieplicki; Ryan Schneider; Hamlet Tibbs
- Home arena: Patrick Gym

2018–19 America East Conference men's basketball standings
	Conf.				Overall
Team	W		L	PCT	W		L	PCT
Vermont †	14	–	2	.875	27	–	7	.794
Stony Brook	12	–	4	.750	24	–	9	.727
UMBC	11	–	5	.688	21	–	13	.618
Hartford	10	–	6	.625	18	–	15	.545
UMass Lowell	7	–	9	.438	15	–	17	.469
Albany	7	–	9	.438	12	–	20	.375
Binghamton	5	–	11	.313	10	–	23	.303
Maine	3	–	13	.188	5	–	27	.156
New Hampshire	3	–	13	.188	5	–	24	.172
† 2019 America East tournament winner

The 2018–19 Vermont Catamounts men's basketball team represented the University of Vermont in the 2018–19 NCAA Division I men's basketball season. They played their home games at the Patrick Gym in Burlington, Vermont and were led by 8th-year head coach John Becker. They finished the season 27–7, 14–2 in America East play to win the regular season championship. They defeated Maine, Binghamton, and UMBC to be champions of the America East tournament. They earned the America East's automatic bid to the NCAA tournament where they lost in the first round to Florida State.

== Previous season ==
The Catamounts finished the 2017–18 season 27–8, 15–1 in the America East Conference play to finish in first place. In the America East tournament, they defeated Maine and Stony Brook to advance to the championship game, where they lost to UMBC. As a regular season conference champion who failed to win their conference tournament, the Catamounts received an automatic bid to the National Invitation Tournament, where they lost to Middle Tennessee in the first round.

== Roster ==
2018–19 Vermont Catamounts men's basketball team
Players
Coaches

Pos.	#	Name	Height	Weight	Year	Previous school	Hometown
G	0	Stef Smith	6 ft 1 in (1.85 m)	170 lb (77 kg)	So	Bill Crothers Secondary School	Ajax, Ontario
G	1	Skyler Nash	6 ft 6 in (1.98 m)	215 lb (98 kg)	RS Fr	Gould Academy	Chicago, IL
F	3	Anthony Lamb	6 ft 6 in (1.98 m)	227 lb (103 kg)	Jr	Greece Athena HS	Rochester, NY
G	4	Robin Duncan	6 ft 5 in (1.96 m)	190 lb (86 kg)	Fr	Evansville Harrison HS	Evansville, IN
F	5	Samuel Dingba	6 ft 5 in (1.96 m)	205 lb (93 kg)	RS Sr	Salisbury School	Yaoundé, Cameroon
F	12	Bailey Patella	6 ft 5 in (1.96 m)	185 lb (84 kg)	So	Vermont Academy	Lenox, MA
F	14	Isaiah Moll	6 ft 6 in (1.98 m)	220 lb (100 kg)	Fr	Colonie Central HS	Albany, NY
F	15	Ra Kpedi	6 ft 9 in (2.06 m)	220 lb (100 kg)	So	Lawrence North HS	Indianapolis, IN
G	20	Ernie Duncan	6 ft 3 in (1.91 m)	190 lb (86 kg)	RS Sr	Evansville Harrison HS	Evansville, IN
G	21	Everett Duncan	6 ft 6 in (1.98 m)	190 lb (86 kg)	RS Jr	Evansville Harrison HS	Evansville, IN
G	24	Ben Shungu	6 ft 2 in (1.88 m)	200 lb (91 kg)	RS So	Rice Memorial HS	Burlington, VT
G	25	Kevin Garrison (W)	6 ft 0 in (1.83 m)	180 lb (82 kg)	Fr	Burlington HS	Burlington, VT
F	32	Josh Speidel	6 ft 7 in (2.01 m)	210 lb (95 kg)	RS So	Columbus North HS	Columbus, IN
F	35	Ryan Davis	6 ft 8 in (2.03 m)	250 lb (113 kg)	Fr	James B. Conant HS	Schaumburg, IL
C	44	Jake Lorenzo (W)	7 ft 0 in (2.13 m)	220 lb (100 kg)	Fr	Point Pleasant Beach HS	Englishtown, NJ

Head coach

- John Becker (Catholic)

Assistant coach(es)

- Kyle Cieplicki (Vermont)
- Ryan Schneider (Marist)
- Hamlet Tibbs (West Virginia)

Legend

- (C) Team captain
- (S) Suspended
- (I) Ineligible
- (W) Walk-on
- Injured
- Current redshirt

Roster
Last update: December 5, 2018

== Schedule and results ==
Date time, TV	Rank^{#}	Opponent^{#}	Result	Record	Site (attendance) city, state
Exhibition
October 27, 2018*; 7:00 pm		Concordia	W 80–43		Patrick Gym (2,318); Burlington, VT
November 4, 2018*; 4:30 pm		Saint Michael's	W 90–61		Patrick Gym (2,482); Burlington, VT
Non-conference regular season
November 9, 2018*; 7:00 pm, NESNPlus		at Boston University	W 78–72	1–0	Case Gym (1,185); Boston, MA
November 12, 2018*; 9:00 pm, ESPN2		at No. 2 Kansas; NIT Season Tip-Off campus game	L 68–84	1–1	Allen Fieldhouse (16,300); Lawrence, KS
November 14, 2018*; 7:00 pm, ESPN+		NVU–Lyndon; NIT Season Tip-Off campus game	W 122–56	2–1	Patrick Gym (2,053); Burlington, VT
November 16, 2018*; 7:00 pm, ACCN Extra		at Louisville; NIT Season Tip-Off campus game	L 78–86	2–2	KFC Yum! Center (15,977); Louisville, KY
November 21, 2018*; 7:00 pm, ESPN+		Yale	W 79–70	3–2	Patrick Gym (2,582); Burlington, VT
November 25, 2018*; 2:00 pm, ESPN3		Bucknell	L 61–69	3–3	Patrick Gym (2,446); Burlington, VT
November 28, 2018*; 7:00 pm, ESPN+		at George Washington	W 69–53	4–3	Charles E. Smith Center (2,252); Washington, D.C.
November 30, 2018*; 7:00 pm		at Towson	W 70–64	5–3	SECU Arena (1,458); Towson, MD
December 3, 2018*; 7:00 pm, ESPN+		at George Mason	W 72–67	6–3	EagleBank Arena (2,704); Fairfax, VA
December 8, 2018*; 7:00 pm, ESPN+		Harvard	W 71–65	7–3	Patrick Gym (2,959); Burlington, VT
December 16, 2018*; 2:00 pm, ESPN+		Northeastern	W 75–70	8–3	Patrick Gym (2,629); Burlington, VT
December 18, 2018*; 7:00 pm, ESPN+		St. Bonaventure	W 83–76 ^{2nd OT}	9–3	Patrick Gym (2,389); Burlington, VT
December 21, 2018*; 7:15 pm		at Lipscomb	L 66–91	9–4	Allen Arena (1,474); Nashville, TN
January 2, 2019*; 7:00 pm, ESPN+		Dartmouth	W 73–69	10–4	Patrick Gym (2,542); Burlington, VT
America East Conference regular season
January 5, 2019; 7:00 pm, ESPN3		at Albany	W 80–51	11–4 (1–0)	SEFCU Arena (2,733); Albany, NY
January 9, 2019; 7:00 pm, ESPN3		at Maine	W 73–49	12–4 (2–0)	Cross Insurance Center (995); Bangor, ME
January 12, 2019; 7:00 pm, ESPN3		Hartford	W 81–62	13–4 (3–0)	Patrick Gym (3,266); Burlington, VT
January 16, 2019; 7:00 pm, ESPN+		at New Hampshire	W 73–59	14–4 (4–0)	Lundholm Gym (415); Durham, NH
January 19, 2019; 1:00 pm, ESPN3		Binghamton	W 78–50	15–4 (5–0)	Patrick Gym (2,812); Burlington, VT
January 23, 2019; 7:00 pm, ESPN3		UMBC	L 61–74	15–5 (5–1)	Patrick Gym (2,540); Burlington, VT
January 26, 2019; 1:00 pm, ESPN3		at Stony Brook	W 73–52	16–5 (6–1)	Island Federal Credit Union Arena (4,009); Stony Brook, NY
February 2, 2019; 5:30 pm, ESPN3		at UMass Lowell	W 74-65	17–5 (7–1)	Tsongas Center (2,378); Lowell, MA
February 6, 2019; 7:00 pm, ESPN+		Maine	W 86–63	18–5 (8–1)	Patrick Gym (2,472); Burlington, VT
February 9, 2019; 2:00 pm, ESPN3		Albany	W 67–49	19–5 (9–1)	Patrick Gym (3,116); Burlington, VT
February 13, 2019; 7:00 pm, ESPN3		New Hampshire	W 73–44	20–5 (10–1)	Patrick Gym (2,152); Burlington, VT
February 16, 2019; 5:00 pm, ESPN+		at Hartford	W 77–75	21–5 (11–1)	Chase Arena at Reich Family Pavilion (1,202); West Hartford, CT
February 21, 2019; 7:00 pm		at UMBC	L 56–65	21–6 (11–2)	UMBC Event Center (2,411); Catonsville, MD
February 23, 2019; 2:00 pm, ESPN3		at Binghamton	W 69–63	22–6 (12–2)	Binghamton University Events Center (2,546); Vestal, NY
March 2, 2019; 7:00 pm, ESPN+		Stony Brook	W 56-50	23-6 (13-2)	Patrick Gym (3,266); Burlington, VT
March 5, 2019; 7:00 pm, ESPN+		UMass Lowell	W 74–57	24–6 (14–2)	Patrick Gym (2,546); Burlington, VT
America East tournament
March 9, 2019; 7:00 pm, ESPN3	(1)	(8) Maine; Quarterfinals	W 73–57	25–6	Patrick Gym (2,750); Burlington, VT
March 12, 2019; 7:00 pm, ESPN3	(1)	(7) Binghamton; Semifinals	W 84–51	26–6	Patrick Gym (2,890); Burlington, VT
March 16, 2019; 11:00 am, ESPN2	(1)	(3) UMBC; Championship	W 66–49	27–6	Patrick Gym (3,070); Burlington, VT
NCAA tournament
March 21, 2019*; 2:00 pm, TBS	(13 W)	vs. (4 W) No. 10 Florida State; First Round	L 69–76	27–7	XL Center (14,838); Hartford, CT
*Non-conference game. ^{#}Rankings from AP Poll. (#) Tournament seedings in parentheses. W=West. All times are in Eastern.
