= 2018–19 Hartford Hawks men's basketball team =

American college basketball season

2018–19 Hartford Hawks men's basketball
- Conference: America East Conference
- Record: 18–15 (10–6 America East)
- Head coach: John Gallagher (9th season)
- Assistant coaches: Tom Devitt; John Linehan; Matt Mihalich
- Home arena: Chase Arena at Reich Family Pavilion

2018–19 America East Conference men's basketball standings
	Conf.				Overall
Team	W		L	PCT	W		L	PCT
Vermont †	14	–	2	.875	27	–	7	.794
Stony Brook	12	–	4	.750	24	–	9	.727
UMBC	11	–	5	.688	21	–	13	.618
Hartford	10	–	6	.625	18	–	15	.545
UMass Lowell	7	–	9	.438	15	–	17	.469
Albany	7	–	9	.438	12	–	20	.375
Binghamton	5	–	11	.313	10	–	23	.303
Maine	3	–	13	.188	5	–	27	.156
New Hampshire	3	–	13	.188	5	–	24	.172
† 2019 America East tournament winner

The 2018–19 Hartford Hawks men's basketball team represented the University of Hartford in the 2018–19 NCAA Division I men's basketball season. They played their home games at the Chase Arena at Reich Family Pavilion in West Hartford, Connecticut and were led by 9th-year head coach John Gallagher. They were members of the America East Conference. They finished the season 18–15, 10–6 in America East play to finish in fourth place. They defeated UMass Lowell in the quarterfinals of the America East tournament before losing in the semifinals to UMBC.

== Previous season ==
The Hawks finished the 2017–18 season 19–14, 11–5 in America East Conference play to finish in third place. In the America East tournament, they defeated New Hampshire in the quarterfinals, before losing in the semifinals to UMBC. They were invited to the CollegeInsider.com Tournament, where they lost in the first round to San Diego.

== Roster ==
2018–19 Hartford Hawks men's basketball team
Players
Coaches

Pos.	#	Name	Height	Weight	Year	Previous school	Hometown
F	0	Hunter Marks	6 ft 9 in (2.06 m)	190 lb (86 kg)	Fr	Wonthaggi Secondary College	Phillip Island, Australia
F	1	Zach Brown	6 ft 6 in (1.98 m)	190 lb (86 kg)	So	Rutgers Prep	Princeton, NJ
G/F	3	Romain Boxus	6 ft 6 in (1.98 m)	210 lb (95 kg)	Jr	Snow College	Haneffe, Belgium
F	4	George Blagojevic	6 ft 8 in (2.03 m)	220 lb (100 kg)	Sr	BA Centre of Excellence	Geelong, Australia
F	5	John Carroll	6 ft 8 in (2.03 m)	220 lb (100 kg)	RS Sr	The Hill School	Dublin, Ireland
F	10	Nikola Colovic	6 ft 10 in (2.08 m)	225 lb (102 kg)	RS So	N/A	Belgrade, Serbia
G	11	Darius Kinnel	6 ft 0 in (1.83 m)	190 lb (86 kg)	Fr	St. Joseph's Prep	Blackwood, NJ
G	12	Jason Dunne	6 ft 4 in (1.93 m)	185 lb (84 kg)	Sr	Matawan Regional HS	Matawan, NJ
G	13	J.R. Lynch	5 ft 10 in (1.78 m)	170 lb (77 kg)	Sr	St. Andrew's School (RI)	Hoboken, NJ
F	15	Eddie Davis III	6 ft 7 in (2.01 m)	250 lb (113 kg)	GS	Southern Miss	Las Vegas, NV
G	20	Max Twyman	6 ft 5 in (1.96 m)	200 lb (91 kg)	Sr	Albany	Rye, NY
G	21	Matt Hobbs	6 ft 4 in (1.93 m)	190 lb (86 kg)	So	New England	Anchorage, AK
G	22	Travis Weatherington	6 ft 2 in (1.88 m)	215 lb (98 kg)	Sr	Palm Beach State	Palm Beach, FL
G	23	Michael Dunne	6 ft 0 in (1.83 m)	180 lb (82 kg)	Fr	Matawan Regional HS	Matawan, NJ
G	25	D.J. Mitchell	6 ft 0 in (1.83 m)	155 lb (70 kg)	Fr	St. Thomas More School (CT)	Englewood Cliffs, NJ
G	34	Mark Bowditch	6 ft 1 in (1.85 m)	170 lb (77 kg)	Fr	IMG Academy	Milton, WI
F	45	Petr Stepanyants	6 ft 9 in (2.06 m)	220 lb (100 kg)	So	Balboa City School	Moscow, Russia

Head coach

- John Gallagher (Saint Joseph's)

Assistant coach(es)

- Tom Devitt (Boston College)
- John Linehan (Providence)
- Matt Mihalich (John Carroll)

Legend

- (C) Team captain
- (S) Suspended
- (I) Ineligible
- (W) Walk-on
- Injured
- Current redshirt

Roster
Last update: November 8, 2018

== Schedule and results ==
Date time, TV	Rank^{#}	Opponent^{#}	Result	Record	Site (attendance) city, state
Non-conference regular season
November 6, 2018*; 7:00 pm, ESPN3		Central Connecticut; Rivalry	L 68–75	0–1	Chase Arena at Reich Family Pavilion (1,269); West Hartford, CT
November 9, 2018*; 9:00 pm		at Utah State; MGM Resorts Main Event campus-site game	L 73–100	0–2	Smith Spectrum (8,500); Logan, UT
November 11, 2018*; 5:00 pm, SECN		at No. 18 Mississippi State; MGM Resorts Main Event campus-site game	L 59–77	0–3	Humphrey Coliseum (5,953); Starkville, MS
November 15, 2018*; 7:00 pm, ESPN+		at Quinnipiac	W 68–54	1–3	People's United Center (543); Hamden, CT
November 19, 2018*; 11:00 am		vs. Utah Valley; MGM Resorts Main Event Middleweight semifinals	L 65–72	1–4	Cox Pavilion; Paradise, NV
November 21, 2018*; 1:00 pm		vs. Iona; MGM Resorts Main Event Middleweight 3rd place game	L 75–80	1–5	Cox Pavilion; Paradise, NN
November 24, 2018*; 2:00 pm, ESPN3		Western New England	W 93–53	2–5	Chase Arena at Reich Family Pavilion (543); West Hartford, CT
November 27, 2018*; 6:00 pm, ESPN3		at Sacred Heart	L 89–98	2–6	William H. Pitt Center (758); Farifield, CT
December 1, 2018*; 7:00 pm, ESPN+		Bowling Green	W 76–63	3–6	Chase Arena at Reich Family Pavilion (732); West Hartford, CT
December 5, 2018*; 7:00 pm, ESPN2		at No. 3 Duke	L 54–84	3–7	Cameron Indoor Stadium (9,314); Durham, NC
December 12, 2018*; 7:00 pm		at Bryant	W 91–74	4–7	Chace Athletic Center (418); Smithfield, RI
December 16, 2018*; 4:30 pm, ESPN+		Oakland	W 87–82	5–7	Chase Arena at Reich Family Pavilion (1,179); West Hartford, CT
December 22, 2018*; 2:00 pm		at Wagner	L 68–77	5–8	Spiro Sports Center (1,216); Staten Island, NY
December 29, 2018*; 2:00 pm, ESPN3		Marist	W 65–56	6–8	Chase Arena at Reich Family Pavilion (802); West Hartford, CT
December 31, 2018*; 1:00 pm, ACCN Extra		at Boston College	W 79–78 ^{OT}	7–8	Conte Forum (5,472); Chestnut Hill, MA
America East Conference regular season
January 9, 2019; 7:00 pm, ESPN+		UMBC	W 66–64 ^{OT}	8–8 (1–0)	Chase Arena at Reich Family Pavilion (559); West Hartford, CT
January 12, 2019; 7:00 pm, ESPN+		at Vermont	L 62–81	8–9 (1–1)	Patrick Gym (3,266); Burlington, VT
January 16, 2019; 7:00 pm, ESPN+		at Maine	W 77–76	9–9 (2–1)	Cross Insurance Center (918); Bangor, ME
January 19, 2019; 2:00 pm, ESPN3		UMass Lowell	L 73–76	9–10 (2–2)	Chase Arena at Reich Family Pavilion; West Hartford, CT
January 23, 2019; 7:00 pm, ESPN+		New Hampshire	W 74–39	10–10 (3–2)	Chase Arena at Reich Family Pavilion (734); West Hartford, CT
January 26, 2019; 3:00 pm, ESPN+		at Albany	L 77–84	10–11 (3–3)	SEFCU Arena (2,085); Albany, NY
January 30, 2019; 7:00 pm, ESPN3		Binghamton	W 86–60	11–11 (4–3)	Chase Arena at Reich Family Pavilion (595); West Hartford, CT
February 2, 2019; 7:00 pm, ESPN+		at Stony Brook	L 77–86	11–12 (4–4)	Island Federal Credit Union Arena (3,153); Stony Brook, NY
February 6, 2019; 7:00 pm, ESPN+		at UMBC	W 70–61	12–12 (5–4)	UMBC Event Center (1,888); Baltimore, MD
February 13, 2019; 7:00 pm, ESPN+		Maine	W 81–73	13–12 (6–4)	Chase Arena at Reich Family Pavilion (864); West Hartford, CT
February 16, 2019; 5:00 pm, ESPN+		Vermont	L 75–77	13–13 (6–5)	Chase Arena at Reich Family Pavilion (1,202); West Hartford, CT
February 21, 2019; 7:00 pm		at New Hampshire	W 70–50	14–13 (7–5)	Lundholm Gym (239); Durham, NH
February 23, 2019; 5:30 pm, ESPN3		at UMass Lowell	W 75–73	15–13 (8–5)	Tsongas Center (2,893); Lowell, MA
February 27, 2019; 7:00 pm, ESPN+		at Binghamton	W 96–76	16–13 (9–5)	Binghamton University Events Center (1,564); Vestal, NY
March 2, 2019; 5:00 pm, ESPN+		Albany	W 82–80 ^{OT}	17–13 (10–5)	Chase Arena at Reich Family Pavilion (1,458); West Hartford, CT
March 5, 2019; 7:00 pm, ESPN+		Stony Brook	L 63–68	17–14 (10–6)	Chase Arena at Reich Family Pavilion (964); West Hartford, CT
America East tournament
March 9, 2019; 5:00 pm, ESPN3	(4)	(5) UMass Lowell; Quarterfinals	W 78–70	18–14	Chase Arena at Reich Family Pavilion (993); West Hartford, CT
March 12, 2019; 7:00 pm, ESPN3	(4)	(3) UMBC; Semifinals	L 85–90 ^{2OT}	18–15	UMBC Event Center (3,042); Catonsville, MD
*Non-conference game. ^{#}Rankings from AP Poll. (#) Tournament seedings in parentheses. All times are in Eastern.
