= 2019 America East men's basketball tournament =

- Classification: Division I
- Season: 2018–19
- Teams: 8
- Site: Campus sites
- Finals site: Patrick Gym; Burlington, VT
- Champions: Vermont (7th title)
- Winning coach: John Becker (2nd title)
- MVP: Anthony Lamb (Vermont)
- Attendance: 3,070
- Top scorer: Anthony Lamb (Vermont) (80 points)
- Television: ESPN+ ESPN2

2018–19 America East Conference men's basketball standings
| | Conf. | | | | Overall |
| Team | W | | L | PCT | W | | L | PCT |
|---|---|---|---|---|---|---|---|---|
| Vermont † | 14 | – | 2 | .875 | 27 | – | 7 | .794 |
| Stony Brook | 12 | – | 4 | .750 | 24 | – | 9 | .727 |
| UMBC | 11 | – | 5 | .688 | 21 | – | 13 | .618 |
| Hartford | 10 | – | 6 | .625 | 18 | – | 15 | .545 |
| UMass Lowell | 7 | – | 9 | .438 | 15 | – | 17 | .469 |
| Albany | 7 | – | 9 | .438 | 12 | – | 20 | .375 |
| Binghamton | 5 | – | 11 | .313 | 10 | – | 23 | .303 |
| Maine | 3 | – | 13 | .188 | 5 | – | 27 | .156 |
| New Hampshire | 3 | – | 13 | .188 | 5 | – | 24 | .172 |
† 2019 America East tournament winner

The 2019 America East men's basketball tournament was the postseason men's basketball tournament for the America East Conference, which was held on March 9, 12, and 16, 2019. All tournament games were played on home arenas of the higher-seeded school. Vermont defeated UMBC 66–49 in the championship game and received the conference's automatic bid to the NCAA tournament. This was the seventh time Vermont has won the America East tournament championship, which ties them with former member Northeastern for the most all time.

== Seeds ==
The top eight teams in the conference standings qualified for the tournament. The teams were seeded by record in conference, with a tiebreaker system to seed teams with identical conference records.

| Seed | School | Conf. record | Tiebreaker |
|---|---|---|---|
| 1 | Vermont | 14–2 | |
| 2 | Stony Brook | 12–4 | |
| 3 | UMBC | 11–5 | |
| 4 | Hartford | 10–6 | |
| 5 | UMass Lowell | 7–9 | 2–0 vs. Albany |
| 6 | Albany | 7–9 | 0–2 vs. UMass Lowell |
| 7 | Binghamton | 5–11 | |
| 8 | Maine | 3–13 | 2–6 on road |
| DNQ | New Hampshire | 3–13 | 1–7 on road |

== Schedule ==
| Game | Time | Matchup | Score | Television | Attendance |
Quarterfinals – Saturday, March 9
| 1 | 1:00 pm | No. 6 Albany at No. 3 UMBC | 54–62 | ESPN+ | 2,766 |
| 2 | 5:00 pm | No. 5 UMass Lowell at No. 4 Hartford | 70–78 | ESPN+ | 933 |
| 3 | 7:00 pm | No. 8 Maine at No. 1 Vermont | 57–73 | ESPN+ | 2,750 |
| 4 | 7:00 pm | No. 7 Binghamton at No. 2 Stony Brook | 78–72 | ESPN+ | 3,108 |
Semifinals – Tuesday, March 12
| 5 | 7:00 pm | No. 7 Binghamton at No. 1 Vermont | 51–84 | ESPN+ | 3,266 |
| 6 | 7:00 pm | No. 4 Hartford at No. 3 UMBC | 85–90 (2OT) | ESPN+ | 3,042 |
Championship – Saturday, March 16
| 7 | 11:00 am | No. 3 UMBC at No. 1 Vermont | 49–66 | ESPN2 | 3,070 |
Game times in ET. Rankings denote tournament seeding. All games hosted by higher-seeded team.

== Bracket and results ==
Teams are reseeded after each round with highest remaining seeds receiving home court advantage.

Quarterfinals; Saturday, March 9, 2019; ESPN +
1 | Vermont | 73
8 | Maine | 57
4 | Hartford | 78
5 | UMass Lowell | 70
(Pairings are reseeded after the first round)
2 | Stony Brook | 72
7 | Binghamton | 78
3 | UMBC | 62
6 | Albany | 54

Semifinals; Tuesday, March 12, 2019; ESPN +
1 | Vermont | 84
7 | Binghamton | 51
3 | UMBC | 90**
4 | Hartford | 85

Championship; Saturday, March 16, 2019; ESPN2
1 | Vermont | 66
3 | UMBC | 49

* denotes number of overtime periods

== See also ==
- 2019 America East women's basketball tournament
