= 2018–19 Maine Black Bears men's basketball team =

American college basketball season

2018–19 Maine Black Bears men's basketball
- Conference: America East Conference
- Record: 5–27 (3–13 America East)
- Head coach: Richard Barron (1st season)
- Assistant coaches: Kevin Reed; Edniesha Curry; Igor Vrzina
- Home arena: Cross Insurance Center

2018–19 America East Conference men's basketball standings
	Conf.				Overall
Team	W		L	PCT	W		L	PCT
Vermont †	14	–	2	.875	27	–	7	.794
Stony Brook	12	–	4	.750	24	–	9	.727
UMBC	11	–	5	.688	21	–	13	.618
Hartford	10	–	6	.625	18	–	15	.545
UMass Lowell	7	–	9	.438	15	–	17	.469
Albany	7	–	9	.438	12	–	20	.375
Binghamton	5	–	11	.313	10	–	23	.303
Maine	3	–	13	.188	5	–	27	.156
New Hampshire	3	–	13	.188	5	–	24	.172
† 2019 America East tournament winner

The 2018–19 Maine Black Bears men's basketball team represented the University of Maine in the 2018–19 NCAA Division I men's basketball season. They played their home games at the Cross Insurance Center in Bangor, Maine and were led by 1st-year head coach Richard Barron, who previously served as the head coach of Maine's women's basketball team. They finished the season 5–27 overall, 3–13 in conference play to finish in a tie for eighth place. As the 8th seed in the 2019 America East men's basketball tournament, they were defeated by top-seeded Vermont 57–73 in the quarterfinals.

== Previous season ==
The Black Bears finished the 2017–18 season 6–26, 3–13 in the America East Conference play to finish in eighth place. In the America East tournament, they lost to Vermont in the quarterfinals. On March 5, the school parted ways with head coach Bob Walsh and within hours hired Richard Barron, who was previously head coach Maine's women's basketball team from 2011–2017.

== Roster ==
2018–19 Maine Black Bears men's basketball team
Players
Coaches

Pos.	#	Name	Height	Weight	Year	Previous school	Hometown
F	0	Andrew Fleming	6 ft 7 in (2.01 m)	222 lb (101 kg)	Jr	Oxford Hills HS	Norway, ME
G	1	Mykhailo Yagodin	6 ft 5 in (1.96 m)	195 lb (88 kg)	So	South Plains College	Odesa, Ukraine
G	2	Celio Araujo	5 ft 10 in (1.78 m)	175 lb (79 kg)	Sr	The Masters School	Governador Valadares, Brazil
F	3	Vilgot Larsson	6 ft 8 in (2.03 m)	215 lb (98 kg)	So	Hill College	Stockholm, Sweden
G	4	Terion Moss	5 ft 10 in (1.78 m)	175 lb (79 kg)	Fr	Portland HS	Portland, ME
F	5	Nedeljko Prijovic	6 ft 8 in (2.03 m)	210 lb (95 kg)	Jr	Texas State	Belgrade, Serbia
F	10	Stephane Ingo	6 ft 9 in (2.06 m)	200 lb (91 kg)	Fr	Gould Academy	Mississauga, Ontario
F	11	Ilija Stojiljkovic	6 ft 7 in (2.01 m)	223 lb (101 kg)	Sr	Lee Academy	Niš, Serbia
G	12	Lewis Wang	6 ft 1 in (1.85 m)	180 lb (82 kg)	So	Lee Academy	Taipei, Taiwan
F	13	Miks Antoms	6 ft 8 in (2.03 m)	245 lb (111 kg)	So	Lee Academy	Riga, Latvia
G	14	Isaiah White	6 ft 5 in (1.96 m)	195 lb (88 kg)	RS Jr	UNC Asheville	Ellicott City, MD
F	15	David Begic	6 ft 7 in (2.01 m)	209 lb (95 kg)	Fr	Vanguard School (FL)	Zadar, Croatia
F	22	Solomon Iluyomade	6 ft 7 in (2.01 m)	225 lb (102 kg)	So	Laramie County CC	London, England
G	25	Sergio El Darwich	6 ft 4 in (1.93 m)	205 lb (93 kg)	Jr	Western Texas College	Dekwaneh, Lebanon
G	32	Dennis Ashley	6 ft 1 in (1.85 m)	176 lb (80 kg)	Jr	St. Monica Academy	Los Angeles, CA
F/C	50	Vincent Eze	6 ft 8 in (2.03 m)	218 lb (99 kg)	RS Jr	Putnam Science Academy	Bethlehem, PA

Head coach

- Richard Barron (Kenyon)

Assistant coach(es)

- Kevin Reed (Maine)
- Edniesha Curry (Oregon)
- Igor Vrzina (Abilene Christian)

Legend

- (C) Team captain
- (S) Suspended
- (I) Ineligible
- (W) Walk-on
- Injured
- Current redshirt

Roster
Last update: November 8, 2018

== Schedule and results ==
Date time, TV	Rank^{#}	Opponent^{#}	Result	Record	Site (attendance) city, state
Exhibition
November 1, 2018*; 7:30 pm		Maine–Presque Isle	W 82–40		Cross Insurance Center (863); Bangor, ME
Non-conference regular season
November 6, 2018*; 9:00 pm, ALT		at Denver	L 50–63	0–1	Magness Arena (1,822); Denver, CO
November 8, 2018*; 9:00 pm, P12N		at Utah	L 61–75	0–2	Jon M. Huntsman Center (10,971); Salt Lake City, UT
November 10, 2018*; 5:00 pm, Stadium		at San Francisco	L 50–93	0–3	War Memorial Gymnasium (1,813); San Francisco, CA
November 17, 2018*; 2:00 pm, ACCN Extra		at NC State; Wolfpack Classic	L 63–82	0–4	PNC Arena (13,290); Raleigh, NC
November 20, 2018*; 8:00 pm		at North Texas; Wolfpack Classic	L 63–74 ^{OT}	0–5	The Super Pit (2,358); Denton, TX
November 25, 2018*; 2:00 pm, ESPN+		at Quinnipiac	L 50–58	0–6	People's United Center (1,012); Hamden, CT
November 28, 2018*; 7:00 pm, ESPN+		Princeton; Wolfpack Classic	L 59–73	0–7	Cross Insurance Center (1,113); Bangor, ME
December 1, 2018*; 3:00 pm		at Saint Peter's; Wolfpack Classic	L 59–63 ^{OT}	0–8	Yanitelli Center (602); Jersey City, NJ
December 4, 2018*; 7:00 pm, ESPN3		Fordham	W 75–68 ^{2OT}	1–8	Cross Insurance Center (1,036); Bangor, ME
December 8, 2018*; 2:00 pm, ESPN+		at Dartmouth	L 52–78	1–9	Leede Arena (636); Hanover, NH
December 10, 2018*; 7:00 pm, ESPN+		Maine–Machias	W 98–43	2–9	Cross Insurance Center; Bangor, ME
December 16, 2018*; 12:00 pm, ESPN+		at Duquesne	L 46–72	2–10	Palumbo Center (1,487); Pittsburgh, PA
December 22, 2018*; 1:00 pm		Central Connecticut	L 90–93	2–11	Cross Insurance Center (1,084); Bangor, ME
December 29, 2018*; 3:00 pm, BTN Plus		at Rutgers	L 55–70	2–12	Louis Brown Athletic Center (5,401); Piscataway, NJ
January 2, 2019*; 7:00 pm, ESPN+		at Brown	L 67–75	2–13	Pizzitola Sports Center (676); Providence, RI
America East Conference regular season
January 5, 2019; 1:00 pm, ESPN3		at UMBC	L 52–61	2–14 (0–1)	UMBC Event Center (1,081); Catonsville, MD
January 9, 2019; 7:00 pm, ESPN3		Vermont	L 49–73	2–15 (0–2)	Cross Insurance Center (995); Bangor, ME
January 12, 2019; 3:00 pm, ESPN+		at Albany	W 66–62	3–15 (1–2)	SEFCU Arena (1,793); Albany, NY
January 16, 2019; 7:00 pm, ESPN+		Hartford	L 76–77	3–16 (1–3)	Cross Insurance Center (918); Bangor, ME
January 19, 2019; 1:00 pm, ESPN+		Stony Brook	L 61–64	3–17 (1–4)	Cross Insurance Center (929); Bangor, ME
January 26, 2019; 1:00 pm, ESPN3		at Binghamton	L 66–78	3–18 (1–5)	Binghamton University Events Center (2,452); Vestal, NY
January 30, 2019; 7:00 pm		at UMass Lowell	W 78–59	4–18 (2–5)	Tsongas Center (1,232); Lowell, MA
February 3, 2019; 1:00 pm, ESPN3		New Hampshire	W 62–53	5–18 (3–5)	Cross Insurance Center (1,026); Bangor, ME
February 6, 2019; 7:00 pm		at Vermont	L 63–86	5–19 (3–6)	Patrick Gym (2,472); Burlington, VT
February 10, 2019; 1:00 pm, ESPN+		UMBC	L 66–67	5–20 (3–7)	Cross Insurance Center (1,195); Bangor, ME
February 13, 2019; 7:00 pm, ESPN+		at Hartford	L 73–81	5–21 (3–8)	Chase Arena at Reich Family Pavilion (864); West Hartford, CT
February 17, 2019; 1:00 pm, ESPN3		Albany	L 54–63	5–22 (3–9)	Cross Insurance Center (989); Bangor, ME
February 23, 2019; 7:00 pm, ESPN+		at Stony Brook	L 53–81	5–23 (3–10)	Island Federal Credit Union Arena (3,286); Stony Brook, NY
February 27, 2019; 7:00 pm, ESPN+		UMass Lowell	L 61–70	5–24 (3–11)	Cross Insurance Center (981); Bangor, ME
March 2, 2019; 11:00 am, ESPN+		Binghamton	L 60–83	5–25 (3–12)	Cross Insurance Center (818); Bangor, ME
March 5, 2019; 7:00 pm, ESPN+		at New Hampshire	L 53–60	5–26 (3–13)	Lundholm Gym (333); Durham, NH
America East tournament
March 9, 2019; 7:00 pm, ESPN3	(8)	at (1) Vermont; Quarterfinals	L 57–73	5–27	Patrick Gym (2,750); Burlington, VT
*Non-conference game. ^{#}Rankings from AP Poll. (#) Tournament seedings in parentheses. All times are in Eastern.

== See also ==
- 2018–19 Maine Black Bears women's basketball team
