= 2018–19 Binghamton Bearcats men's basketball team =

American college basketball season

2018–19 Binghamton Bearcats men's basketball
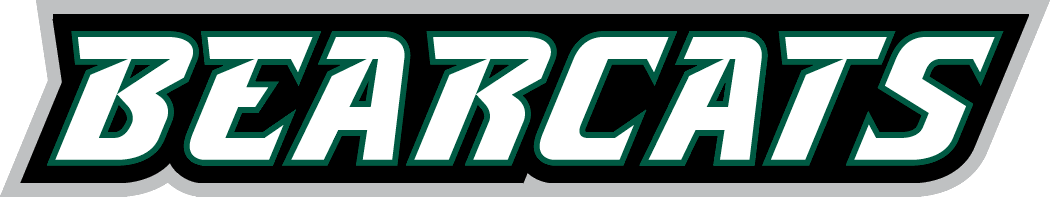
- Conference: America East Conference
- Record: 10–23 (5–11 America East)
- Head coach: Tommy Dempsey (7th season)
- Assistant coaches: Bryan Goodman; Herb Courtney; Chretien Lukusa
- Home arena: Binghamton University Events Center

2018–19 America East Conference men's basketball standings
	Conf.				Overall
Team	W		L	PCT	W		L	PCT
Vermont †	14	–	2	.875	27	–	7	.794
Stony Brook	12	–	4	.750	24	–	9	.727
UMBC	11	–	5	.688	21	–	13	.618
Hartford	10	–	6	.625	18	–	15	.545
UMass Lowell	7	–	9	.438	15	–	17	.469
Albany	7	–	9	.438	12	–	20	.375
Binghamton	5	–	11	.313	10	–	23	.303
Maine	3	–	13	.188	5	–	27	.156
New Hampshire	3	–	13	.188	5	–	24	.172
† 2019 America East tournament winner

The 2018–19 Binghamton Bearcats men's basketball team represented Binghamton University in the 2018–19 NCAA Division I men's basketball season. They played their home games at the Binghamton University Events Center in Vestal, New York and were led by 7th-year head coach Tommy Dempsey. They finished the season 10–23 overall, 5–11 in conference play to finish in seventh place. As the 7th seed in the 2019 America East men's basketball tournament, they upset 2nd seeded Stony Brook in the quarterfinals 78–72, then lost to top-seeded Vermont 51–84 in the semifinals.

On July 14, 2019, incoming sophomore and political science major Calistus Anyichie drowned in the upper portion of Buttermilk Falls State Park near Ithaca, New York.

== Previous season ==
The Bearcats finished the 2017–18 season 11–20, 2–14 in America East Conference play to finish in last place. In turn, they failed to qualify for the America East tournament.

== Roster ==
2018–19 Binghamton Bearcats men's basketball team
Players
Coaches

Pos.	#	Name	Height	Weight	Year	Previous school	Hometown
G	0	Richard Caldwell, Jr.	6 ft 4 in (1.93 m)	190 lb (86 kg)	Jr	Lamar CC	Philadelphia, PA
F	2	Chancellor Barnard	6 ft 4 in (1.93 m)	200 lb (91 kg)	GS	Loyola (MD)	Columbia, MD
G	3	Sam Sessoms	6 ft 0 in (1.83 m)	188 lb (85 kg)	Fr	Shipley School	Philadelphia, PA
G	4	Timmy Rose	6 ft 1 in (1.85 m)	192 lb (87 kg)	Sr	Scranton Prep	Scranton, PA
G/F	5	Tyler Stewart	6 ft 8 in (2.03 m)	180 lb (82 kg)	So	St. Andrew's Episcopal School	Silver Spring, MD
G	10	Leo Gallagher	5 ft 10 in (1.78 m)	150 lb (68 kg)	RS Fr	Seton Catholic Central HS	Binghamton, NY
F	13	Calvin Poulina	6 ft 8 in (2.03 m)	230 lb (104 kg)	Fr	GBA Prague	Leiden, Netherlands
F	14	Calistus Anyichie	6 ft 9 in (2.06 m)	200 lb (91 kg)	Fr	St. Mary of the Assumption HS	Short Hills, NJ
F	20	Caleb Stewart	6 ft 9 in (2.06 m)	200 lb (91 kg)	Sr	St. Leo	Glenville, NY
G	21	Carter Stewart	6 ft 6 in (1.98 m)	185 lb (84 kg)	Fr	Mekeel Christian Academy	Glenville, NY
G	22	Everson Davis	6 ft 3 in (1.91 m)	185 lb (84 kg)	Sr	Peddie School	Saint Kitts
G	24	Michael Besselink	6 ft 6 in (1.98 m)	185 lb (84 kg)	Fr	International School of Helsinki	Helsinki, Finland
F/C	32	Thomas Bruce	6 ft 9 in (2.06 m)	225 lb (102 kg)	Sr	DeMatha Catholic HS	Washington, D.C.
G	33	J.C. Show	6 ft 3 in (1.91 m)	205 lb (93 kg)	GS	Bucknell	Clarks Summit, PA
G	40	Albert Odero	6 ft 4 in (1.93 m)	190 lb (86 kg)	So	St. John's Catholic Prep	Oneonta, NY

Head coach

- Tommy Dempsey (Susquehanna)

Assistant coach(es)

- Bryan Goodman (Barat)
- Herb Courtney (Delaware)
- Chretien Lukusa (Binghamton)

Legend

- (C) Team captain
- (S) Suspended
- (I) Ineligible
- (W) Walk-on
- Injured
- Current redshirt

Roster
Last update: November 6, 2018

== Schedule and results ==
Date time, TV	Rank^{#}	Opponent^{#}	Result	Record	Site (attendance) city, state
Non-conference regular season
November 6, 2018*; 8:00 pm, ESPN+		Cornell; CNY Hoops Classic	L 75–86	0–1	Binghamton University Events Center (2,108); Vestal, NY
November 9, 2018*; 8:00 pm, ESPN+		NJIT; CNY Hoops Classic	L 57–74	0–2	Binghamton University Events Center (2,509); Vestal, NY
November 12, 2018*; 7:00 pm, ESPN3		Misericordia; CNY Hoops Classic	W 107–64	1–2	Binghamton University Events Center (1,577); Vestal, NY
November 16, 2018*; 7:00 pm, ESPNU		at Northwestern	L 54–82	1–3	Welsh–Ryan Arena (7,039); Evanston, IL
November 19, 2018*; 7:00 pm, Patriot League Network		at Colgate; CNY Hoops Classic	L 68–76	1–4	Cotterell Court (324); Hamilton, NY
November 24, 2018*; 2:00 pm, ESPN+		Sacred Heart	W 78–73	2–4	Binghamton University Events Center (1,827); Vestal, NY
November 28, 2018*; 7:30 pm		at Army	L 56–67	2–5	Christl Arena (500); West Point, NY
December 1, 2018*; 2:00 pm, ESPN3		Hartwick College	W 89–70	3–5	Binghamton University Events Center (1,501); Vestal, NY
December 5, 2018*; 7:00 pm		at Morgan State	L 68–74	3–6	Talmadge L. Hill Field House (1,008); Baltimore, MD
December 8, 2018*; 2:30 pm, ESPN+		Loyola (MD)	L 65–83	3–7	Binghamton University Events Center (2,748); Vestal, NY
December 15, 2018*; 2:00 pm, ESPN+		Youngstown State	L 48–58	3–8	Binghamton University Events Center (1,527); Vestal, NY
December 18, 2018*; 7:00 pm, ACCN Extra		at Notre Dame	L 56–69	3–9	Edmund P. Joyce Center (6,359); South Bend, IN
December 21, 2018*; 12:00 pm		at LIU Brooklyn	W 68–67	4–9	Steinberg Wellness Center (721); Brooklyn, NY
December 30, 2018*; 12:00 pm, BTN		at No. 2 Michigan	L 52–74	4–10	Crisler Center (12,707); Ann Arbor, MI
January 2, 2019*; 7:00 pm, ESPN+		Columbia	L 63–65	4–11	Binghamton University Events Center (1,624); Vestal, NY
America East Conference regular season
January 5, 2019; 2:00 pm, ESPN3		New Hampshire	W 69–58	5–11 (1–0)	Binghamton University Events Center (2,142); Vestal, NY
January 9, 2019; 7:00 pm, ESPN3		at Stony Brook	L 46–59	5–12 (1–1)	Island Federal Credit Union Arena (2,647); Stony Brook, NY
January 16, 2019; 7:00 pm, ESPN+		at UMBC	L 49–68	5–13 (1–2)	UMBC Event Center (915); Catonsville, MD
January 19, 2019; 7:00 pm, ESPN3		at Vermont	L 50–78	5–14 (1–3)	Patrick Gym (2,812); Burlington, VT
January 23, 2019; 7:00 pm, ESPN3		UMass Lowell	L 79–85	5–15 (1–4)	Binghamton University Events Center (4,710); Vestal, NY
January 26, 2019; 1:00 pm, ESPN3		Maine	W 78–66	6–15 (2–4)	Binghamton University Events Center (2,452); Vestal, NY
January 30, 2019; 7:00 pm, ESPN3		at Hartford	L 60–86	6–16 (2–5)	Chase Arena at Reich Family Pavilion (595); West Hartford, CT
February 2, 2019; 7:00 pm, ESPN+		at Albany	L 50–64	6–17 (2–6)	SEFCU Arena (3,891); Albany, NY
February 6, 2019; 7:00 pm, ESPN3		Stony Brook	L 59–85	6–18 (2–7)	Binghamton University Events Center (1,683); Vestal, NY
February 9, 2019; 1:00 pm, ESPN3		at New Hampshire	W 68–61	7–18 (3–7)	Lundholm Gym (547); Durham, NH
February 13, 2019; 7:00 pm, ESPN+		UMBC	L 50–64	7–19 (3–8)	Binghamton University Events Center (2,001); Vestal, NY
February 21, 2019; 7:00 pm		at UMass Lowell	W 81–66	8–19 (4–8)	Costello Athletic Center (301); Lowell, MA
February 23, 2019; 2:00 pm, ESPN3		Vermont	L 63–69	8–20 (4–9)	Binghamton University Events Center (5,142); Vestal, NY
February 27, 2019; 7:00 pm, ESPN+		Hartford	L 76–96	8–21 (4–10)	Binghamton University Events Center (1,564); Vestal, NY
March 2, 2019; 1:00 pm, ESPN+		at Maine	W 83–60	9–21 (5–10)	Cross Insurance Center (818); Bangor, ME
March 5, 2019; 7:00 pm, ESPN+		Albany	L 58–73	9–22 (5–11)	Binghamton University Events Center (2,164); Vestal, NY
America East tournament
March 9, 2019; 7:00 pm, ESPN+	(7)	at (2) Stony Brook; Quarterfinals	W 78–72	10–22	Island Federal Credit Union Arena (3,108); Stony Brook, NY
March 12, 2019; 7:00 pm, ESPN+	(7)	at (1) Vermont; Semifinals	L 51–84	10–23	Patrick Gym (3,266); Burlington, VT
*Non-conference game. ^{#}Rankings from AP Poll. (#) Tournament seedings in parentheses. All times are in Eastern.
