= 2018–19 UMBC Retrievers men's basketball team =

American college basketball season

2018–19 UMBC Retrievers men's basketball
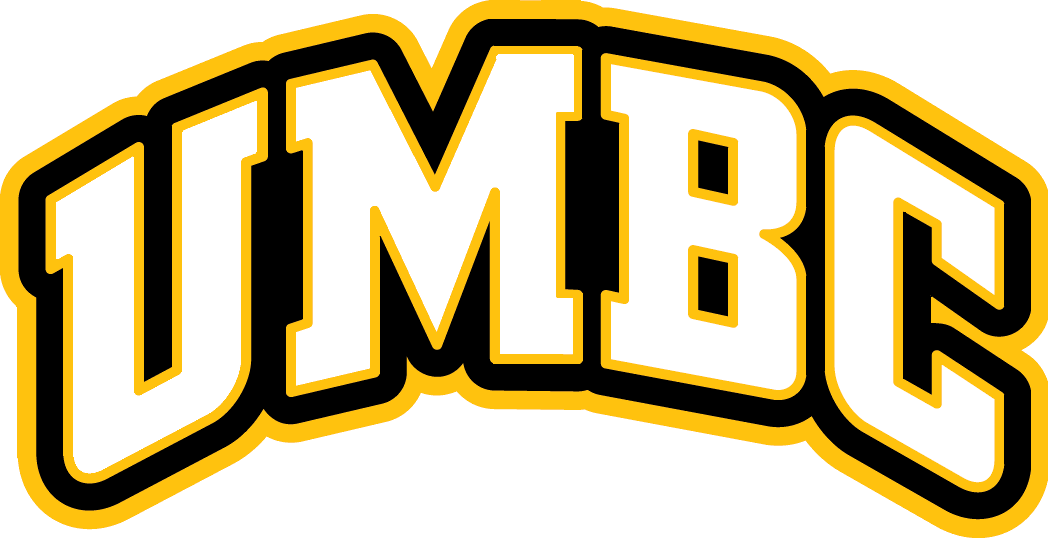

Bimini Jam champion
- Conference: America East Conference
- Record: 21–13 (11–5 America East)
- Head coach: Ryan Odom (3rd season)
- Assistant coaches: Nate Dixon; Bryce Crawford; Matt Henry
- Home arena: UMBC Event Center

2018–19 America East Conference men's basketball standings
	Conf.				Overall
Team	W		L	PCT	W		L	PCT
Vermont †	14	–	2	.875	27	–	7	.794
Stony Brook	12	–	4	.750	24	–	9	.727
UMBC	11	–	5	.688	21	–	13	.618
Hartford	10	–	6	.625	18	–	15	.545
UMass Lowell	7	–	9	.438	15	–	17	.469
Albany	7	–	9	.438	12	–	20	.375
Binghamton	5	–	11	.313	10	–	23	.303
Maine	3	–	13	.188	5	–	27	.156
New Hampshire	3	–	13	.188	5	–	24	.172
† 2019 America East tournament winner

The 2018–19 UMBC Retrievers men's basketball team represented the University of Maryland, Baltimore County in the 2018–19 NCAA Division I men's basketball season. They played their home games at the UMBC Event Center in Catonsville, Maryland, with one game being played at their former home, the Retriever Activities Center, and were led by third-year head coach Ryan Odom. They were members of the America East Conference. They finished the season 21–13, 11–5 in America East play to finish in third place. They defeated Albany and Hartford to advance to the championship game of the America East tournament where they lost to Vermont. Despite having 21 wins, they did not participate in a postseason tournament.

== Previous season ==
The Retrievers finished the 2017–18 season 25–11, 12–4 in the America East Conference play to finish in second place. In the America East tournament, they beat UMass Lowell and Hartford to advance to the championship, where they defeated Vermont. As a result, the Retrievers received the conference's automatic bid to the NCAA tournament. As the No. 16 seed in the South region, they defeated the No. 1 overall seed Virginia by 20 points, becoming the first 16th-seeded team to beat a No. 1 seed. The win is considered either the biggest, or second-biggest, upset in NCAA Tournament history depending on seedings or point spreads. The Retrievers lost to Kansas State in the second round.

== Roster ==
2018–19 UMBC Retrievers men's basketball team
Players
Coaches

Pos.	#	Name	Height	Weight	Year	Previous school	Hometown
G	0	Isaiah Rogers	6 ft 2 in (1.88 m)	190 lb (86 kg)	Sr	Jonathan Dayton HS	West Orange, NJ
G	1	Josh Rosario	6 ft 2 in (1.88 m)	205 lb (93 kg)	So	Miami Christian School	Miami, FL
G	3	K. J. Jackson	6 ft 2 in (1.88 m)	180 lb (82 kg)	Jr	Hightower HS	Houston, TX
G	5	Jack Schwietz	6 ft 5 in (1.96 m)	210 lb (95 kg)	Fr	Findlay Prep	Frisco, TX
G	11	R.J. Eytle-Rock	6 ft 3 in (1.91 m)	225 lb (102 kg)	Fr	Barking Abbey School	London, England
F	12	Brandon Horvath	6 ft 10 in (2.08 m)	200 lb (91 kg)	So	Southern HS	West River, MD
F	13	Joe Sherburne	6 ft 6 in (1.98 m)	220 lb (100 kg)	GS	Brewster Academy	Whitefish Bay, WI
G	15	Jose Placer	6 ft 2 in (1.88 m)	185 lb (84 kg)	Fr	The Master's Academy	Orlando, FL
F/C	21	Sam Schwietz	6 ft 9 in (2.06 m)	225 lb (102 kg)	RS Jr	Johnson Ferry Christian Academy	Frisco, TX
G	22	Ricky Council II	6 ft 5 in (1.96 m)	210 lb (95 kg)	Jr	Moravian Prep	Durham, NC
F	23	Max Curran	6 ft 9 in (2.06 m)	205 lb (93 kg)	Jr	Pembroke Academy	Hooksett, NH
F	30	Daniel Akin	6 ft 9 in (2.06 m)	215 lb (98 kg)	So	Barking Abbey School	London, England
F	33	Arkel Lamar	6 ft 5 in (1.96 m)	235 lb (107 kg)	Jr	St. Thomas More School (CT)	Bridgeport, CT
F	34	Max Portmann	6 ft 7 in (2.01 m)	220 lb (100 kg)	Sr	Rider HS	Wichita Falls, TX
F/C	35	Nolan Gerrity	6 ft 10 in (2.08 m)	235 lb (107 kg)	Sr	Berea–Midpark HS	Cleveland, OH

Head coach

- Ryan Odom (Hampden–Sydney)

Assistant coach(es)

- Nate Dixon (UNC Wilmington)
- Bryce Crawford (Ohio State)
- Matt Henry (Trinity)

Legend

- (C) Team captain
- (S) Suspended
- (I) Ineligible
- (W) Walk-on
- Injured
- Current redshirt

Roster
Last update: December 1, 2018

== Schedule and results ==
Date time, TV	Rank^{#}	Opponent^{#}	Result	Record	Site (attendance) city, state
Non-conference regular season
November 6, 2018*; 8:00 pm, FS1		at Marquette	L 42–67	0–1	Fiserv Forum (14,103); Milwaukee, WI
November 10, 2018*; 1:00 pm		Shenandoah; Bimini Jam	W 93–45	1–1	UMBC Event Center (1,083); Catonsville, MD
November 12, 2018*; 7:00 pm		Manhattan	W 75–52	2–1	UMBC Event Center (1,164); Catonsville, MD
November 16, 2018*; 3:30 pm		vs. Air Force; Bimini Jam	W 77–72 ^{2OT}	3–1	Gateway Christian Academy (527); Bimini, Bahamas
November 17, 2018*; 8:30 pm		vs. High Point; Bimini Jam	W 68–59	4–1	Gateway Christian Academy (571); Bimini, Bahamas
November 19, 2018*; 8:30 pm		vs. South Dakota; Bimini Jam	L 52–58	4–2	Gateway Christian Academy (561); Bimini, Bahamas
November 24, 2018*; 1:00 pm		American	L 69–73	4–3	UMBC Event Center (1,037); Catonsville, MD
November 30, 2018*; 7:00 pm		at Northern Kentucky	L 60–78	4–4	BB&T Arena (3,462); Highland Heights, KY
December 3, 2018*; 7:00 pm		at Coppin State	W 71–60	5–4	Physical Education Complex (727); Baltimore, MD
December 8, 2018*; 2:00 pm		at Drexel	W 91–76	6–4	Daskalakis Athletic Center (1,159); Philadelphia, PA
December 11, 2018*; 7:00 pm		Towson	L 76–80 ^{2OT}	6–5	UMBC Event Center (2,476); Catonsville, MD
December 16, 2018*; 7:00 pm		Florida Gulf Coast	L 53–76	6–6	Retriever Activities Center (1,204); Baltimore, MD
December 21, 2018*; 1:00 pm		Hood	W 86–65	7–6	UMBC Event Center (805); Catonsville, MD
December 29, 2018*; 1:00 pm, BTN Plus		at Penn State	L 52–74	7–7	Bryce Jordan Center (9,042); University Park, PA
December 31, 2018*; 1:00 pm, ESPN+		Centenary	W 98–48	8–7	UMBC Event Center (1,328); Catonsville, MD
America East Conference regular season
January 5, 2019; 1:00 pm, ESPN3		Maine	W 61–52	9–7 (1–0)	UMBC Event Center (1,081); Catonsville, MD
January 9, 2019; 7:00 pm, ESPN+		at Hartford	L 64–66 ^{OT}	9–8 (1–1)	Chase Arena at Reich Family Pavilion (559); West Hartford, Connecticut
January 12, 2019; 5:30 pm, ESPN3		at UMass Lowell	L 63–74	9–9 (1–2)	Tsongas Center (3,118); Lowell, MA
January 16, 2019; 7:00 pm, ESPN+		Binghamton	W 68–49	10–9 (2–2)	UMBC Event Center (915); Catonsville, MD
January 19, 2019; 1:00 pm, ESPN3		Albany	W 65–64 ^{OT}	11–9 (3–2)	UMBC Event Center (1,659); Catonsville, MD
January 23, 2019; 7:00 pm, ESPN3		at Vermont	W 74–61	12–9 (4–2)	Patrick Gym (2,540); Burlington, VT
January 26, 2019; 1:00 pm, ESPN+		at New Hampshire	W 59–51	13–9 (5–2)	Lundholm Gym (604); Durham, NH
January 30, 2019; 7:00 pm, ESPN+		Stony Brook	W 57–49	14–9 (6–2)	UMBC Event Center (2,260); Catonsville, MD
February 6, 2019; 7:00 pm, ESPN+		Hartford	L 61–70	14–10 (6–3)	UMBC Event Center (1,888); Catonsville, MD
February 10, 2019; 1:00 pm, ESPN+		at Maine	W 67–66	15–10 (7–3)	Cross Insurance Center (1,195); Bangor, ME
February 13, 2019; 7:00 pm, ESPN+		at Binghamton	W 64–50	16–10 (8–3)	Binghamton University Events Center (2,001); Vestal, NY
February 16, 2019; 1:00 pm, ESPN3		UMass Lowell	W 70–66	17–10 (9–3)	UMBC Event Center (2,688); Catonsville, MD
February 21, 2019; 7:00 pm, ESPNU		Vermont	W 65–56	18–10 (10–3)	UMBC Event Center (2,411); Catonsville, MD
February 23, 2019; 7:00 pm, ESPN3		at Albany	L 75–84	18–11 (10–4)	SEFCU Arena (2,306); Albany, NY
February 27, 2019; 7:00 pm, ESPN+		at Stony Brook	L 63–78	18–12 (10–5)	Island Federal Credit Union Arena (2,790); Stony Brook, NY
March 2, 2019; 1:00 pm, ESPN+		New Hampshire	W 56–53	19–12 (11–5)	UMBC Event Center (2,002); Catonsville, MD
America East tournament
March 9, 2019; 1:00 pm, ESPN3	(3)	(6) Albany; Quarterfinals	W 62–54	20–12	UMBC Event Center (2,766); Catonsville, MD
March 12, 2019; 7:00 pm, ESPN3	(3)	(4) Hartford; Semifinals	W 90–85 ^{2OT}	21–12	UMBC Event Center (3,042); Catonsville, MD
Mar 16, 2019; 11:00 am, ESPN2	(3)	at (1) Vermont; Championship game	L 49–66	21–13	Patrick Gym (3,070); Burlington, VT
*Non-conference game. ^{#}Rankings from AP Poll. (#) Tournament seedings in parentheses. All times are in Eastern.
