= 2018–19 New Hampshire Wildcats men's basketball team =

American college basketball season

2018–19 New Hampshire Wildcats men's basketball
- Conference: America East Conference
- Record: 5–24 (3–13 America East)
- Head coach: Bill Herrion (14th season)
- Assistant coaches: Chris Mohr; Jordon Bronner; Ryan Herrion
- Home arena: Lundholm Gym

2018–19 America East Conference men's basketball standings
| | Conf. | | | | Overall |
| Team | W | | L | PCT | W | | L | PCT |
|---|---|---|---|---|---|---|---|---|
| Vermont † | 14 | – | 2 | .875 | 27 | – | 7 | .794 |
| Stony Brook | 12 | – | 4 | .750 | 24 | – | 9 | .727 |
| UMBC | 11 | – | 5 | .688 | 21 | – | 13 | .618 |
| Hartford | 10 | – | 6 | .625 | 18 | – | 15 | .545 |
| UMass Lowell | 7 | – | 9 | .438 | 15 | – | 17 | .469 |
| Albany | 7 | – | 9 | .438 | 12 | – | 20 | .375 |
| Binghamton | 5 | – | 11 | .313 | 10 | – | 23 | .303 |
| Maine | 3 | – | 13 | .188 | 5 | – | 27 | .156 |
| New Hampshire | 3 | – | 13 | .188 | 5 | – | 24 | .172 |
† 2019 America East tournament winner

The 2018–19 New Hampshire Wildcats men's basketball team represented the University of New Hampshire in the 2018–19 NCAA Division I men's basketball season. They played their home games at the Lundholm Gym in Durham, New Hampshire and were led by 14th-year head coach Bill Herrion. They finished the season 5–24 overall, 3–13 in conference play to finish in a tie for eighth place. They failed to qualify for the 2019 America East men's basketball tournament.

== Previous season ==
The Wildcats finished the 2017–18 season 10–21, 6–10 in the America East Conference play to finish in a tie for sixth place. In the America East tournament, they lost to Hartford in the quarterfinals.

== Roster ==
2018–19 New Hampshire Wildcats men's basketball team
Players
Coaches

| Pos. | # | Name | Height | Weight | Year | Previous school | Hometown |
|---|---|---|---|---|---|---|---|
| G | 0 | Kijana Love | 6 ft 1 in (1.85 m) | 170 lb (77 kg) | Jr | Byron P. Steele II HS | Cibolo, TX |
| G | 1 | Marque Maultsby | 6 ft 3 in (1.91 m) | 165 lb (75 kg) | Fr | Garner Magnet HS | Raleigh, NC |
| F | 2 | David Hall | 6 ft 6 in (1.98 m) | 205 lb (93 kg) | Jr | Colby CC | Bucyrus, OH |
| F | 3 | Nick Guadarrama | 6 ft 5 in (1.96 m) | 220 lb (100 kg) | Fr | Perkiomen School | Newington, CT |
| G | 5 | Mark Carbone | 6 ft 2 in (1.88 m) | 180 lb (82 kg) | Jr | East Catholic HS | Wethersfield, CT |
| G | 10 | John Ogwuche | 6 ft 1 in (1.85 m) | 190 lb (86 kg) | Jr | Greenforest McCalep Christian Academic Center | Makurdi, Nigeria |
| G | 11 | Jordan Reed | 6 ft 0 in (1.83 m) | 190 lb (86 kg) | Sr | Lovejoy HS | Lucas, TX |
| G | 13 | Elijah Jordan | 6 ft 1 in (1.85 m) | 185 lb (84 kg) | So | The First Academy | Orlando, FL |
| G | 14 | Nate Hobbs | 6 ft 3 in (1.91 m) | 183 lb (83 kg) | Fr | St. John's Prep | Peabody, MA |
| G | 15 | Josh Hopkins | 6 ft 5 in (1.96 m) | 185 lb (84 kg) | So | James B. Dudley HS | Greensboro, NC |
| F | 22 | David Watkins | 6 ft 8 in (2.03 m) | 225 lb (102 kg) | Sr | Brimmer and May School | Dorchester, MA |
| F | 23 | Chris Lester | 6 ft 6 in (1.98 m) | 225 lb (102 kg) | Jr | Barrington HS | Barrington, IL |
| F | 24 | Jayden Martinez | 6 ft 7 in (2.01 m) | 195 lb (88 kg) | Fr | Byron P. Steele II HS | Cibolo, TX |
| G | 33 | Evan Horn | 6 ft 0 in (1.83 m) | 201 lb (91 kg) | So | Cedar Crest HS | Lebanon, PA |
| F | 44 | Luke Rosinski | 6 ft 8 in (2.03 m) | 235 lb (107 kg) | Jr | Kimball Union Academy | Derry, NH |

Head coach

- Bill Herrion (Merrimack)

Assistant coach(es)

- Chris Mohr (Merrimack)
- Jordon Bronner (New Hampshire)
- Ryan Herrion (New Hampshire)

Legend

- (C) Team captain
- (S) Suspended
- (I) Ineligible
- (W) Walk-on
- Injured
- Current redshirt

Roster
Last update: November 9, 2018

== Schedule and results ==
| Date time, TV | Opponent | Result | Record | Site (attendance) city, state |
Non-conference regular season
| November 6, 2018*; 7:00 pm | Rivier | W 108–54 | 1–0 | Lundholm Gym (343); Durham, NH |
| November 9, 2018*; 7:00 pm, ESPN+ | at UMass | L 75–104 | 1–1 | William D. Mullins Memorial Center (2,563); Amherst, MA |
| November 12, 2018*; 1:00 pm | Mount Saint Vincent | W 100–61 | 2–1 | Lundholm Gym (227); Durham, NH |
| November 16, 2018*; 7:00 pm | at American | L 44–68 | 2–2 | Bender Arena (799); Washington, D.C. |
| November 20, 2018*; 7:00 pm | Quinnipiac | L 63–69 | 2–3 | Lundholm Gym (237); Durham, NH |
| November 24, 2018*; 12:00 pm, SNY | at UConn | L 66–91 | 2–4 | XL Center (8,351); Hartford, CT |
| November 28, 2018*; 7:00 pm | Boston University | L 53–82 | 2–5 | Lundholm Gym (327); Durham, NH |
| December 1, 2018*; 1:00 pm | at Bryant | L 65–75 | 2–6 | Chace Athletic Center (593); Smithfield, RI |
| December 4, 2018*; 6:30 pm, FS1 | at Seton Hall | L 57–77 | 2–7 | Prudential Center (6,380); Newark, NJ |
| December 9, 2018*; 12:30 pm | at Niagara | L 67–71 | 2–8 | Gallagher Center (832); Lewiston, NY |
| December 19, 2018*; 11:00 am, ESPN3 | Marist | L 49–58 | 2–9 | Lundholm Gym (577); Durham, NH |
| December 22, 2018*; 1:00 pm, ESPN+ | Fairfield | L 57–63 | 2–10 | Lundholm Gym (493); Durham, NH |
| December 30, 2018*; 12:00 pm, NESN | at Dartmouth | L 68–76 | 2–11 | Leede Arena (963); Hanover, NH |
America East Conference regular season
| January 5, 2019; 2:00 pm, ESPN3 | at Binghamton | L 58–69 | 2–12 (0–1) | Binghamton University Events Center (2,142); Vestal, NY |
| January 9, 2019; 7:00 pm, ESPN3 | UMass Lowell | W 68–64 | 3–12 (1–1) | Lundholm Gym (340); Durham, NH |
| January 12, 2019; 7:00 pm, ESPN+ | at Stony Brook | L 44–62 | 3–13 (1–2) | Island Federal Credit Union Arena (2,817); Stony Brook, NY |
| January 16, 2019; 7:00 pm, ESPN+ | Vermont | L 59–73 | 3–14 (1–3) | Lundholm Gym (415); Durham, NH |
| January 23, 2019; 7:00 pm, ESPN+ | at Hartford | L 39–74 | 3–15 (1–4) | Chase Arena at Reich Family Pavilion (734); West Hartford, CT |
| January 26, 2019; 1:00 pm, ESPN+ | UMBC | L 51–59 | 3–16 (1–5) | Lundholm Gym (604); Durham, NH |
| January 30, 2019; 7:00 pm, ESPN+ | Albany | L 42–62 | 3–17 (1–6) | Lundholm Gym (283); Durham, NH |
| February 3, 2019; 1:00 pm, ESPN3 | Maine | L 53–62 | 3–18 (1–7) | Cross Insurance Center (1,026); Bangor, ME |
| February 6, 2019; 7:00 pm, ESPN+ | at UMass Lowell | L 62–72 | 3–19 (1–8) | Costello Athletic Center (451); Lowell, MA |
| February 9, 2019; 1:00 pm, ESPN3 | Binghamton | L 61–68 | 3–20 (1–9) | Lundholm Gym (547); Durham, NH |
| February 13, 2019; 7:00 pm, ESPN3 | at Vermont | L 44–73 | 3–21 (1–10) | Patrick Gym (2,152); Burlington, VT |
| February 16, 2019; 1:00 pm, ESPN3 | Stony Brook | L 64–66 | 3–22 (1–11) | Lundholm Gym (397); Durham, NH |
| February 21, 2019; 7:00 pm | Hartford | L 50–70 | 3–23 (1–12) | Lundholm Gym (239); Durham, NH |
| February 27, 2019; 7:00 pm, ESPN+ | at Albany | W 62–58 | 4–23 (2–12) | SEFCU Arena (1,560); Albany, NY |
| March 2, 2019; 1:00 pm, ESPN+ | at UMBC | L 53–56 | 4–24 (2–13) | UMBC Event Center (2,002); Catonsville, MD |
| March 5, 2019; 7:00 pm, ESPN+ | Maine | W 60–53 | 5–24 (3–13) | Lundholm Gym (333); Durham, NH |
*Non-conference game. ^{#}Rankings from AP Poll. (#) Tournament seedings in parentheses. All times are in Eastern.
