= Tommy Dempsey =

American basketball player-coach (born 1974)

Current position
- Title: Head Coach
- Team: Seton Catholic Central HS

Biographical details
- Born: January 27, 1974 (age 52); Scranton, Pennsylvania, U.S.

Playing career
- 1994–1997: Susquehanna

Coaching career (HC unless noted)
- 2000–2002: Keystone
- 2002–2003: Lackawanna CC
- 2003–2005: Rider (asst.)
- 2005–2012: Rider
- 2012–2021: Binghamton
- 2023-present: Seton Catholic Central HS

Head coaching record
- Overall: 279–310 (.474)

Accomplishments and honors

Awards
- MAAC Coach of the Year (2008)

Tommy Dempsey (born January 27, 1974) is an American college basketball coach and former head men's basketball coach at Binghamton University and Rider.

== Coaching career ==
Dempsey began his college coaching career in 2000 as the head coach at Keystone College, where he led the team to a 55–8 record in two seasons guiding the team to a NJCAA Division III Final Four appearance. For the 2002–03 season, Dempsey spent a season at Lackawanna College where he guided the team the NJCAA Division II title game and a 33–4 overall record.

=== Rider ===
Dempsey joined the coaching staff at Rider as an assistant in 2003, serving in the position for two seasons before being elevated to head coach during the 2005–06 season as the Broncs went 8–20. The team doubled its win total a year later and by his third year at the helm, Rider recorded a school record 23-win season with the help of future NBA first round pick Jason Thompson. Over the next four years, Dempsey had 82 wins, which was the most in Rider history, while also guiding the team to three postseason appearances.

Dempsey compiled a 119–105 record in seven seasons at Rider.

=== Binghamton ===
Dempsey was hired at Binghamton in May 2012, taking over for Mark Macon, inheriting a team that went 2–29 in 2011–12. After nine seasons and a 72–194 overall record, Dempsey's contract was not renewed.

== Head coaching record ==
=== College ===
Record table
| Season | Team | Overall | Conference | Standing | Postseason |
|---|---|---|---|---|---|
Keystone College (EPCC) (2000–2002)
| 2000–01 | Keystone | 26–4 | N/A | N/A | |
| 2001–02 | Keystone | 29–4 | N/A | N/A | NJCAA Final Four |
| Keystone: | | 55–8 (.873) | N/A | | |
Lackawanna College (Garden State Athletic Conference) (2002–2003)
| 2002–03 | Lackawanna | 33–4 | N/A | N/A | NJCAA Runner Up |
| Lackawanna: | | 33–4 (.892) | N/A | | |
Rider (MAAC) (2005–2012)
| 2005–06 | Rider | 8–20 | 4–14 | 10th | |
| 2006–07 | Rider | 16–15 | 9–9 | 7th | |
| 2007–08 | Rider | 23–11 | 13–5 | T-1st | CBI First Round |
| 2008–09 | Rider | 19–13 | 12–6 | 3rd | CIT First Round |
| 2009–10 | Rider | 17–16 | 9–9 | 6th | |
| 2010–11 | Rider | 23–11 | 13–5 | 2nd | CIT First Round |
| 2011–12 | Rider | 13–19 | 10–8 | 5th | |
| Rider: | | 119–105 (.531) | 70–56 (.556) | | |
Binghamton (America East Conference) (2012–2021)
| 2012–13 | Binghamton | 3–27 | 1–15 | 9th | |
| 2013–14 | Binghamton | 7–23 | 4–12 | 7th | |
| 2014–15 | Binghamton | 6–26 | 5–11 | 7th | |
| 2015–16 | Binghamton | 8–22 | 5–11 | 6th | |
| 2016–17 | Binghamton | 12–20 | 3–13 | T–8th | |
| 2017–18 | Binghamton | 11–20 | 2–14 | 9th | |
| 2018–19 | Binghamton | 10–23 | 5–11 | 7th | |
| 2019–20 | Binghamton | 10–19 | 4–12 | 9th | |
| 2020–21 | Binghamton | 4–14 | 4–10 | 9th | |
| Binghamton: | | 72–194 (.271) | 34–108 (.239) | | |
| Total: | | 279–310 (.474) | | | |
National champion Postseason invitational champion Conference regular season champion Conference regular season and conference tournament champion Division regular season champion Division regular season and conference tournament champion Conference tournament champion
