= 2018–19 UMass Lowell River Hawks men's basketball team =

American college basketball season

2018–19 UMass Lowell River Hawks men's basketball
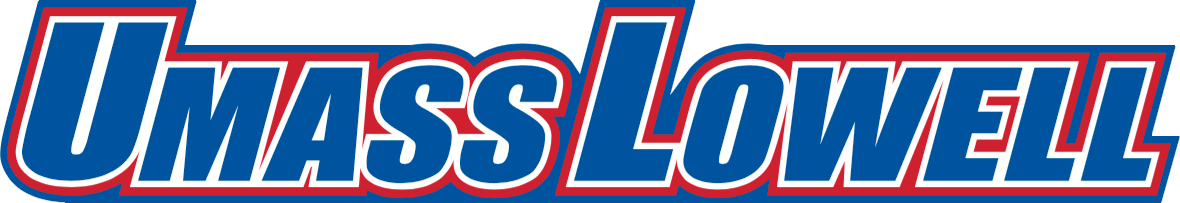
- Conference: America East Conference
- Record: 15–17 (7–9 America East)
- Head coach: Pat Duquette (6th season)
- Assistant coaches: Biko Paris; Nick Leonardelli; Louis Hinnant
- Home arena: Costello Athletic Center; Tsongas Center

2018–19 America East Conference men's basketball standings
	Conf.				Overall
Team	W		L	PCT	W		L	PCT
Vermont †	14	–	2	.875	27	–	7	.794
Stony Brook	12	–	4	.750	24	–	9	.727
UMBC	11	–	5	.688	21	–	13	.618
Hartford	10	–	6	.625	18	–	15	.545
UMass Lowell	7	–	9	.438	15	–	17	.469
Albany	7	–	9	.438	12	–	20	.375
Binghamton	5	–	11	.313	10	–	23	.303
Maine	3	–	13	.188	5	–	27	.156
New Hampshire	3	–	13	.188	5	–	24	.172
† 2019 America East tournament winner

The 2018–19 UMass Lowell River Hawks men's basketball team represented the University of Massachusetts Lowell in the 2018–19 NCAA Division I men's basketball season. The River Hawks split their home games between the Costello Athletic Center and the Tsongas Center, both of which are located in Lowell, Massachusetts, and they were led by sixth-year head coach Pat Duquette. They were members of the America East Conference. They finished the season 15–17, 7–9 in America East play, to finish in a tie for fifth place. They lost in the quarterfinals of the America East tournament to Hartford.

== Previous season ==
The River Hawks finished the 2017–18 season 12–18, 6–10 in the America East Conference play, to finish in a tie for sixth place. In the America East tournament, they were defeated by UMBC in the quarterfinals.

== Roster ==
2018–19 UMass Lowell River Hawks men's basketball team
Players
Coaches

Pos.	#	Name	Height	Weight	Year	Previous school	Hometown
G	0	Shawn Jones	6 ft 0 in (1.83 m)	180 lb (82 kg)	Sr	Howard College	Bridge City, LA
G	1	Bryce Daley	6 ft 4 in (1.93 m)	190 lb (86 kg)	Fr	Salisbury School	Pittsfield, MA
G	2	Sesan Russell	6 ft 2 in (1.88 m)	195 lb (88 kg)	Fr	Charnwood College	London, England
G	3	Alex Rivera	6 ft 1 in (1.85 m)	185 lb (84 kg)	Fr	Lowell HS	Lowell, MA
F	4	Darius Henderson	6 ft 9 in (2.06 m)	230 lb (104 kg)	Fr	La Salle College Prep	Pasadena, CA
G	5	Ryan Jones	6 ft 3 in (1.91 m)	180 lb (82 kg)	Sr	Cleveland HS	Rio Rancho, NM
G	11	Obadiah Noel	6 ft 4 in (1.93 m)	190 lb (86 kg)	So	Tuscarora HS	Frederick, MD
G/F	12	Josh Gantz	6 ft 7 in (2.01 m)	220 lb (100 kg)	RS Sr	Bishop Ready HS	Grove City, OH
F	14	Joey Glynn	6 ft 6 in (1.98 m)	220 lb (100 kg)	Fr	Portsmouth HS	Portsmouth, NH
F	15	Allin Blunt	6 ft 7 in (2.01 m)	205 lb (93 kg)	Fr	Gonzaga College HS	Bowie, MD
G	23	Christian Lutete	6 ft 5 in (1.96 m)	200 lb (91 kg)	RS Jr	Radford	Silver Spring, MD
G	24	Joey Naccarato	6 ft 4 in (1.93 m)	215 lb (98 kg)	So	Coeur d'Alene HS	Coeur d'Alene, ID
F	35	Connor Bennett	6 ft 11 in (2.11 m)	235 lb (107 kg)	RS Jr	Wilmington HS	Wilmington, MA
F	40	Mark Mayle	6 ft 9 in (2.06 m)	215 lb (98 kg)	Fr	Malvern HS	Malvern, OH

Head coach

- Pat Duquette (Williams)

Assistant coach(es)

- Biko Paris (Boston College)
- Nick Leonardelli (Dickinson)
- Louis Hinnant (Boston College)

Legend

- (C) Team captain
- (S) Suspended
- (I) Ineligible
- (W) Walk-on
- Injured
- Current redshirt

Roster
Last update: June 1, 2024

== Schedule and results ==
Date time, TV	Rank^{#}	Opponent^{#}	Result	Record	Site (attendance) city, state
Non-conference regular season
November 6, 2018*; 7:00 p.m., NESNPlus/Eleven Sports		at UMass	L 75–83	0–1	William D. Mullins Memorial Center (2,976); Amherst, MA
November 10, 2018*; 1:00 p.m., ESPN3		Wagner	W 88–84 ^{OT}	1–1	Costello Athletic Center (1,078); Lowell, MA
November 13, 2018*; 7:00 p.m.		at Central Connecticut	L 74–86	1–2	William H. Detrick Gymnasium (1,024); New Britain, CT
November 16, 2018*; 7:30 p.m., ESPN+		at Brown; Brown Bears Tip-Off Classic	L 74–82	1–3	Pizzitola Sports Center (1,131); Providence, RI
November 17, 2018*; 3:30 p.m., ESPN+		vs. Army; Brown Bears Tip-Off Classic	W 92–85	2–3	Pizzitola Sports Center (863); Providence, RI
November 18, 2018*; 1:30 p.m., ESPN+		vs. Sacred Heart; Brown Bears Tip-Off Classic	W 94–90	3–3	Pizzitola Sports Center (946); Providence, RI
November 23, 2018*; 2:00 p.m.		UMass Boston	W 88–59	4–3	Costello Athletic Center (617); Lowell, MA
November 25, 2018*; 1:00 p.m., ESPN+		at Duquesne	L 71–83	4–4	Palumbo Center (1,638); Pittsburgh, PA
November 27, 2018*; 7:00 p.m., SNY		at UConn	L 75–97	4–5	Harry A. Gampel Pavilion (5,507); Storrs, CT
December 1, 2018*; 2:00 p.m., ESPN3		NJIT	W 94–71	5–5	Tsongas Center (1,152); Lowell, MA
December 4, 2018*; 7:00 p.m.		at Boston University	L 60–79	5–6	Case Gym (603); Boston, MA
December 7, 2018*; 7:00 p.m.		Maine Fort Kent	W 110–63	6–6	Tsongas Center (651); Lowell, MA
December 11, 2018*; 7:00 p.m.		at St. Francis Brooklyn	L 69–75	6–7	Generoso Pope Athletic Complex (518); Brooklyn, NY
December 21, 2018*; 7:00 p.m.		Loyola (MD)	W 97–79	7–7	Costello Athletic Center (706); Lowell, MA
December 29, 2018*; 7:00 p.m.		at Sacred Heart	W 100–91	8–7	William H. Pitt Center; Fairfield, CT
America East Conference regular season
January 5, 2019; 1:00 p.m., ESPN+		Stony Brook	L 63–75	8–8 (0–1)	Costello Athletic Center (652); Lowell, MA
January 9, 2019; 7:00 p.m., ESPN3		at New Hampshire	L 64–68	8–9 (0–2)	Lundholm Gym (340); Durham, NH
January 12, 2019; 5:30 p.m., ESPN3		UMBC	W 74–63	9–9 (1–2)	Tsongas Center (3,118); Lowell, MA
January 16, 2019; 7:00 p.m., ESPN3		Albany	W 84–72	10–9 (2–2)	Costello Athletic Center (411); Lowell, MA
January 19, 2019; 2:00 p.m., ESPN3		at Hartford	W 76–73	11–9 (3–2)	Chase Arena at Reich Family Pavilion; West Hartford, CT
January 23, 2019; 7:00 p.m., ESPN3		at Binghamton	W 85–79	12–9 (4–2)	Binghamton University Events Center (4,710); Vestal, NY
January 30, 2019; 7:00 p.m., ESPN+		Maine	L 59–78	12–10 (4–3)	Tsongas Center (1,232); Lowell, MA
February 2, 2019; 5:30 p.m., ESPN3		Vermont	L 65–74	12–11 (4–4)	Tsongas Center (2,378); Lowell, MA
February 6, 2019; 7:00 p.m., ESPN+		New Hampshire	W 72–62	13–11 (5–4)	Costello Athletic Center (451); Lowell, MA
February 9, 2019; 7:00 p.m., ESPN+		at Stony Brook	L 65–76	13–12 (5–5)	Island Federal Credit Union Arena (3,658); Stony Brook, NY
February 13, 2019; 7:00 p.m., ESPN3		at Albany	W 86–54	14–12 (6–5)	SEFCU Arena (1,876); Albany, NY
February 16, 2019; 1:00 p.m., ESPN3		at UMBC	L 66–70	14–13 (6–6)	UMBC Event Center (2,688); Catonsville, MD
February 21, 2019; 7:00 p.m.		Binghamton	L 66–81	14–14 (6–7)	Costello Athletic Center (301); Lowell, MA
February 23, 2019; 5:30 p.m., ESPN3		Hartford	L 73–75	14–15 (6–8)	Tsongas Center (2,893); Lowell, MA
February 27, 2019; 7:00 p.m., ESPN+		at Maine	W 70–61	15–15 (7–8)	Cross Insurance Center (981); Bangor, ME
March 5, 2019; 7:00 p.m., ESPN+		at Vermont	L 57–74	15–16 (7–9)	Patrick Gym (2,546); Burlington, VT
America East tournament
March 9, 2019; 5:00 p.m., ESPN3	(5)	at (4) Hartford; Quarterfinals	L 70–78	15–17	Chase Arena at Reich Family Pavilion (993); West Hartford, CT
*Non-conference game. ^{#}Rankings from AP poll. (#) Tournament seedings in parentheses. All times are in Eastern.
