= Anthony Lamb (basketball) =

American basketball player (born 1998)

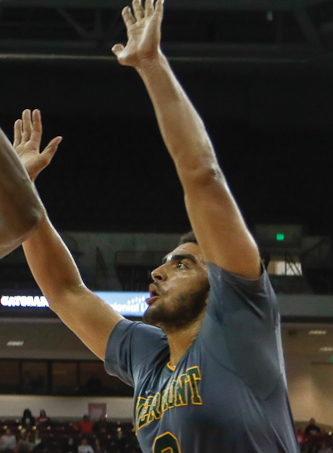
- Lamb with the Vermont Catamounts in 2016

No. 22 – Türk Telekom
- Position: Small forward
- League: BSL; EuroCup

Personal information
- Born: January 20, 1998 (age 28) Rochester, New York, U.S.
- Listed height: 6 ft 6 in (1.98 m)
- Listed weight: 227 lb (103 kg)

Career information
- High school: Greece Athena (Greece, New York)
- College: Vermont (2016–2020)
- NBA draft: 2020: undrafted
- Playing career: 2021–present

Career history
- 2021: Canton Charge
- 2021: Rio Grande Valley Vipers
- 2021: Houston Rockets
- 2021–2022: Rio Grande Valley Vipers
- 2022: San Antonio Spurs
- 2022: Rio Grande Valley Vipers
- 2022–2023: Golden State Warriors
- 2022–2023: →Santa Cruz Warriors
- 2023–2024: New Zealand Breakers
- 2024–2025: Aquila Trento
- 2025–2026: Hapoel Jerusalem
- 2026–present: Türk Telekom

Career highlights
- Italian Cup winner (2025); All-NBL First Team (2024); NBA G League champion (2022); All-NBA G League Third Team (2022); NBA G League Most Improved Player Award (2021); 2× America East Player of the Year (2019, 2020); AP Honorable Mention All-American (2019); 2× First-team All-America East (2019, 2020); Second-team All-America East (2017); America East Rookie of the Year (2017); 2× America East tournament MVP (2017, 2019)
- Stats at NBA.com
- Stats at Basketball Reference
Medals
Men's basketball
Representing United States
FIBA AmeriCup
Bronze medal – third place	2022 Brazil

Anthony Miles Lamb (born January 20, 1998) is an American professional basketball player for Türk Telekom of the Turkish Basketbol Süper Ligi (BSL) and the EuroCup. He played college basketball for the Vermont Catamounts.

== Early life ==
Lamb moved to Rochester, New York at a young age. He attended Greece Athena High School in nearby Greece, New York, where he competed on the basketball team under coach Jim Johnson. As a junior, Lamb averaged 20 points and 13 rebounds per game in leading the team to the Class A state final. He was the only returning starter as a senior and posted 30 points and 17 rebounds per game. Lamb led the team to a number-one ranking in New York and an appearance in the Section V Class AI final. He was one of the finalists for New York Mr. Basketball and was twice named Greater Rochester Player of the Year.

== College career ==
In his first game at Vermont, Lamb scored 23 points on 8-of-12 shooting and collected nine rebounds in a 94–70 win against Quinnipiac. This earned him America East Rookie of the Week recognition. He had his first double-double with 14 points and 14 rebounds against UMass Lowell on January 19, 2017. Lamb averaged 11.9 points and 5.2 rebounds per game as a freshman. He was named to the Second–team All-America East and America East Rookie of the Year.

Lamb missed half of his sophomore season with a foot injury. He averaged 14.3 points and 5.0 rebounds per game.

Lamb scored a career-high 42 points in an 83–76 double-overtime win against St. Bonaventure on December 18, 2018. As a junior, Lamb averaged 21.2 points, 7.8 rebounds, and 2.3 assists per game and led Vermont to a 27–7 record. He was named America East Player of the Year and was an AP Honorable Mention All-American. Lamb was named America East tournament MOP after scoring 28 points in the championship against UMBC.

On November 16, 2019, Lamb scored 23 points including the game-winning shot over two defenders to take down St. John's. This marked the first time Vermont beat a high-major program in over a decade. Lamb upped his point total from his previous outing by scoring 30 points including 25 after halftime on November 19, 2019, in a 61–55 loss to defending national champion Virginia. At the close of the regular season, Lamb repeated as America East Player of the Year.

== Professional career ==
=== Canton Charge (2021) ===
After going undrafted in the 2020 NBA draft, Lamb was signed to a training camp contract by the Detroit Pistons on December 2, 2020. He was waived on December 14 after appearing in 1 preseason game. Lamb then signed with the Canton Charge of the NBA G League after being drafted sixth overall in the 2021 NBA G League draft.

=== Rio Grande Valley Vipers (2021) ===
On February 25, 2021, Lamb was traded to the Rio Grande Valley Vipers. At the end of the season, Lamb was named the G League's Most Improved Player.

=== Houston Rockets (2021) ===
On March 8, 2021, Lamb signed a two-way contract with the Houston Rockets of the National Basketball Association (NBA) after the Vipers were eliminated from the G League playoffs. Lamb made his NBA debut on March 11, 2021, scoring three points and with one rebound in 13 minutes played. His appearance made him the first player from UVM to play in a regular-season NBA game. On April 24, 2021, he was one of seven healthy players available for the Rockets and scored a career-high 21 points in a loss to the Denver Nuggets. Lamb joined the Rockets for the 2021 NBA Summer League, and on September 4, 2021, the Rockets announced that they had signed Lamb to another two-way contract. He was waived on October 18 after appearing in 1 preseason game.

=== Return to Rio Grande Valley / San Antonio Spurs (2021–2022) ===
On November 3, 2021, Lamb re-signed with the Rio Grande Valley Vipers as a returning player. He averaged 15.0 points, 5.6 rebounds, and 2.9 assists per game.

On January 6, 2022, Lamb signed a 10-day contract with the San Antonio Spurs via the hardship exemption. He appeared in two games for the Spurs, and following the expiration of the 10-day contract, he returned to the Vipers.

On March 23, 2022, the Houston Rockets signed Lamb to a two-way contract. He did not appear in a game, and became a free agent at the conclusion of the season.

=== Golden State Warriors (2022–2023) ===
Lamb once again joined the Houston Rockets for the 2022 NBA Summer League. On October 5, 2022, Lamb signed an Exhibit 10 contract with the Golden State Warriors. On October 14, his contract was converted into a two-way contract. On March 17, 2023, Lamb's deal was converted into a standard NBA contract.

=== New Zealand Breakers (2023–2024) ===
On October 10, 2023, Lamb signed with the New Zealand Breakers of the National Basketball League (NBL) as an injury replacement for Justinian Jessup. On February 4, 2024, Lamb ruptured his Achilles in a game against the Perth Wildcats, ending his season. He was named All-NBL First Team.

=== Aquila Basket Trento (2024–2025) ===
On August 2, 2024, Lamb signed with Dolomiti Energia Trento of the Italian Lega Basket Serie A (LBA).

=== Hapoel Jerusalem (2025–2026) ===
On July 30, 2025, Lamb signed with Hapoel Jerusalem of the Israeli Ligat HaAl.

=== Türk Telekom (2026–present) ===
On June 26, 2026, he signed with Türk Telekom of the Turkish Basketbol Süper Ligi (BSL).

== Personal life ==
Lamb is the son of Rachel Lamb, who gave birth to him at the age of 17. She is a Union Roofer after previously working as a CNA. He first met his biological father, Nate Larkins, in November 2017. Lamb has a younger brother, Timothy. Lamb has been public about his struggle with clinical depression, including suicidal thoughts.

=== Rape accusation and lawsuit ===
In 2021, Lamb was accused of committing rape while at the University of Vermont. In December 2022, Lamb was named in a lawsuit against the University of Vermont where one of the plaintiffs, a fellow student-athlete on the Vermont swim team, alleged that she was anally raped by him; Lamb was not included as a defendant. The University of Vermont was accused of purposefully mishandling the investigation to protect Lamb's reputation.

== Career statistics ==
Legend
GP	Games played	GS	Games started	MPG	Minutes per game
FG%	Field goal percentage	3P%	3-point field goal percentage	FT%	Free throw percentage
RPG	Rebounds per game	APG	Assists per game	SPG	Steals per game
BPG	Blocks per game	PPG	Points per game	**Bold**	Career high

=== NBA ===
==== Regular season ====
Year	Team	GP	GS	MPG	FG%	3P%	FT%	RPG	APG	SPG	BPG	PPG
2020–21	Houston	24	3	17.3	.390	.324	**.857**	2.9	1.0	.3	.2	5.5
2021–22	San Antonio	2	0	4.0	—	—	—	.5	1.0	.0	.0	.0
2022–23	Golden State	**62**	**4**	**19.3**	**.471**	**.367**	.767	**3.5**	**1.5**	**.5**	**.3**	**6.7**
Career		88	7	18.4	.447	.353	.790	3.3	1.4	.4	.3	6.2

==== Playoffs ====
Year	Team	GP	GS	MPG	FG%	3P%	FT%	RPG	APG	SPG	BPG	PPG
2023	Golden State	6	0	5.2	.400	.250	–	1.0	.0	.2	.2	.8
Career		6	0	5.2	.400	.250	–	1.0	.0	.2	.2	.8

=== College ===
Year	Team	GP	GS	MPG	FG%	3P%	FT%	RPG	APG	SPG	BPG	PPG
2016–17	Vermont	**35**	**35**	22.5	.512	**.413**	.745	5.5	.7	.8	1.2	12.8
2017–18	Vermont	18	13	23.4	.468	.318	**.829**	5.0	.9	.6	.8	14.3
2018-19	Vermont	32	32	**31.6**	**.515**	.365	.762	**7.8**	2.3	.9	**1.9**	**21.2**
2019-20	Vermont	33	33	31.0	.411	.293	.810	7.1	**2.5**	**1.0**	1.2	16.7
Career		118	113	27.5	.476	.336	.783	6.5	1.7	.8	1.4	16.4
