= Ahmad Clark =

American basketball player (born 1997)

Personal information
- Born: January 9, 1997 (age 29)
- Listed height: 6 ft 1 in (1.85 m)
- Listed weight: 175 lb (79 kg)

Career information
- High school: DeMatha Catholic (Hyattsville, Maryland); DME Academy (Daytona Beach, Florida)
- College: St. Petersburg College (2016–2017); Albany (2017–2020)
- NBA draft: 2020: undrafted
- Playing career: 2021–2023
- Position: Point guard

Career history
- 2021–2022: KK Feniks 2010 Skopje
- 2023: Montréal Toundra

Career highlights
- Second-team All-America East (2020); Third-team All-America East (2019)

Ahmad Clark (born January 9, 1997) is an American former professional basketball player. He played college basketball for Albany.

== High school career ==
Clark attended DeMatha Catholic High School. He joined the varsity basketball team as a junior. Clark rarely played on the team, which was one of the best in the country headlined by NBA player Markelle Fultz. However, he impressed coach Mike Jones with his personality, and Jones considered him skilled despite his infrequent usage. Clark took a postgraduate season at DME Academy. Finding that he had no Division I offers, he committed to St. Petersburg College.

== College career ==
Clark had a successful freshman season at St. Petersburg, averaging 16.5 points per game and leading the team to a 27–8 record. He transferred to Albany following the season, choosing the Great Danes over Morgan State. Clark played sparingly as a sophomore, serving as a backup to Joe Cremo, and averaged 3.7 points per game. He considered transferring after the season, but was persuaded to remain at Albany by his family and St. Petersburg coach Earnest Crumbley. On November 17, 2018, he set career-highs with 30 points and seven assists in a 75–66 win against Canisius. Clark averaged 15.7 points, 4.3 rebounds, 4.3 assists and 2.0 steals per game as a junior, earning Third Team All-America East honors. He started the first 26 games of the season but came off the bench for the final six, struggling with turnovers but remaining an offensive weapon. Clark struggled with hamstring tendinitis during his senior season. On January 11, 2020, he set a single-game school record 19-of-24 free throws and finished with 28 points in a 76–70 victory over Maine. As a senior, Clark averaged 16.7 points, 4.9 rebounds, 4.2 assists and 1.6 steals per game. He was named to the Second Team All-America East.

== Professional career ==
Clark signed his first professional contract with KK Feniks 2010 Skopje of the Prva A Liga on August 27, 2021.

== Personal life ==
Clark is the son of Darren and Emily Clark. His older brother Darren Jr. played basketball at DeMatha Catholic High School.
