= 2017 Diamond Head Classic =

College basketball competition

- Season: 2017–18
- Teams: 8
- Finals site: Stan Sheriff Center; Honolulu, Hawaii
- Champions: USC (2nd title)
- Runner-up: New Mexico State (1st title game)
- Semifinalists: Middle Tennessee (1st semifinal); Miami (FL) (2nd semifinal)
- Winning coach: Andy Enfield (1st title)
- MVP: Bennie Boatwright (USC)

The 2017 Diamond Head Classic was a mid-season eight-team college basketball tournament that was played on December 22, 23, and 25 at the Stan Sheriff Center in Honolulu, Hawaii. It was the ninth annual Diamond Head Classic tournament, and was part of the 2017–18 NCAA Division I men's basketball season. USC defeated New Mexico State to win the tournament championship.

== Bracket ==
* – Denotes overtime period

=== Campus Site Games ===
Game 1 December 19; Pac-12 Network
Princeton	103*
USC	93

=== Championship Round ===
5th place game December 25
Princeton	77
Hawai'i	63
7th place game December 25
Akron	78
Davidson	91

Consolation 2nd Round; December 23; ESPNU / ESPN3
Princeton	64
Akron	62
Davidson	71
Hawai'i	79

First Round; December 22; ESPN / ESPN2
Middle Tennessee	69
Princeton	67
Akron	53
USC	84
Davidson	68
New Mexico State	69
6	Miami (FL)	75
Hawai'i	57

Semifinals; December 23; ESPN2
Middle Tennessee	84
USC	89
New Mexico State	63
6	Miami (FL)	54

Championship; December 25
USC	77
New Mexico State	72
3rd place game December 25
Middle Tennessee	81
15	Miami (FL)	84
