= 2017–18 Dartmouth Big Green men's basketball team =

American college basketball season

2017–18 Dartmouth Big Green men's basketball
- Conference: Ivy League
- Record: 7–20 (3–11 Ivy)
- Head coach: David McLaughlin (2nd season)
- Assistant coaches: Pete Hutchins; James Cormier; Jabari Trotter
- Home arena: Leede Arena

2017–18 Ivy League men's basketball standings
	Conf.				Overall
Team	W		L	PCT	W		L	PCT
x-Harvard	12	–	2	.857	18	–	14	.563
x-Penn †	12	–	2	.857	24	–	9	.727
Yale	9	–	5	.643	16	–	15	.516
Cornell	6	–	8	.429	12	–	16	.429
Princeton	5	–	9	.357	13	–	16	.448
Columbia	5	–	9	.357	8	–	19	.296
Brown	4	–	10	.286	11	–	16	.407
Dartmouth	3	–	11	.214	7	–	20	.259
† 2018 Ivy League Tournament winner x – Ivy League co-champions

The 2017–18 Dartmouth Big Green men's basketball team represented Dartmouth College during the 2017–18 NCAA Division I men's basketball season. The Big Green, led by second-year head coach David McLaughlin, played their home games at Leede Arena in Hanover, New Hampshire as members of the Ivy League. They finished the season 7–20, 3–11 in Ivy League play to finish in last place and fail to qualify for the Ivy League tournament.

== Previous season ==
The Big Green finished the 2016–17 season 7–20, 4–10 in Ivy League play to finish in a three-way tie for last place. They failed to qualify for the inaugural Ivy League tournament.

== Offseason ==
=== Departures ===
Name	Number	Pos.	Height	Weight	Year	Hometown	Reason for departure
Ike Ngwudo	2	F	6'6"	205	Senior	Baldwin, NY	Graduated
Evan Boudreaux	12	F	6'8"	220	Sophomore	Lake Forest, IL	Transferred to Xavier
Mike Fleming	20	G	6'0"	180	Senior	Lake Forest, IL	Graduated
Wesley Dickinson	21	F	6'7"	215	Senior	Bergenfield, NJ	Graduated
Quinten Payne	23	G	6'5"	200	Senior	St. Charles, IL	Graduated
Jonas Stakeliunas	33	F	6'8"	220	Freshman	Klaipėda, Lithuanuia	Left the team for personal reasons
Cole Harrison	44	C	6'11'	245	Senior	Brentwood, TN	Graduate transferred to William & Mary

=== 2017 recruiting class ===
College recruiting information
Name	Hometown	School	Height	Weight	Commit date
Adrease Jackson #104 PF	Rancho Santa Margarita, CA	Santa Margarita Catholic High School	6 ft 7 in (2.01 m)	215 lb (98 kg)	Oct 14, 2016
Adrease Jackson #104 PF	Recruit ratings: Scout: Rivals: (60)				
Chris Knight; PF	De Forest, WI	Madison Memorial High School	6 ft 7 in (2.01 m)	210 lb (95 kg)	Sep 6, 2016
Chris Knight; PF	Recruit ratings: Scout: Rivals: (NR)				
Aaryn Rai; SG	Mono, ON	Athlete Institute Basketball Academy	6 ft 5 in (1.96 m)	190 lb (86 kg)	Oct 12, 2016
Aaryn Rai; SG	Recruit ratings: Scout: Rivals: (NR)				
Ben Swett; PG	Exeter, NH	Phillips Exeter Academy	6 ft 1 in (1.85 m)	175 lb (79 kg)	Oct 3, 2017
Ben Swett; PG	Recruit ratings: Scout: Rivals: (NR)				
Isaac Letoa; PG	Auckland, New Zealand	Westlake Boys High School	6 ft 1 in (1.85 m)	170 lb (77 kg)	Jul 3, 2017
Isaac Letoa; PG	Recruit ratings: Scout: Rivals: (NR)				
Overall recruit ranking:
Note: In many cases, Scout, Rivals, 247Sports, On3, and ESPN may conflict in their listings of height and weight.; In these cases, the average was taken. ESPN grades are on a 100-point scale.; Sources: "2017 Team Ranking". Rivals.

=== 2018 recruiting class ===
College recruiting information (2018)
Name	Hometown	School	Height	Weight	Commit date
Wes Slajchert #55 SG	Oak Park, CA	Oak Park High School	6 ft 4 in (1.93 m)	180 lb (82 kg)	Aug 21, 2017
Wes Slajchert #55 SG	Recruit ratings: Scout: Rivals: (75)				
Overall recruit ranking:
Note: In many cases, Scout, Rivals, 247Sports, On3, and ESPN may conflict in their listings of height and weight.; In these cases, the average was taken. ESPN grades are on a 100-point scale.; Sources: "2018 Team Ranking". Rivals.

== Roster ==
2017–18 Dartmouth Big Green men's basketball team
Players
Coaches

Pos.	#	Name	Height	Weight	Year	Previous school	Hometown
F	0	Will Emery	6 ft 9 in (2.06 m)	215 lb (98 kg)	So	St. Ignatius	San Francisco, CA
G	1	Cameron Smith	6 ft 1 in (1.85 m)	180 lb (82 kg)	Sr	Miller School	Bristow, VA
G	2	Isaac Letoa	6 ft 1 in (1.85 m)	180 lb (82 kg)	Fr	Westlake Boys	Auckland, NZ
F	3	Ian Carter	6 ft 7 in (2.01 m)	205 lb (93 kg)	So	La Mirada	Los Angeles, CA
G	4	Taylor Johnson	6 ft 4 in (1.93 m)	180 lb (82 kg)	Sr	Northwest	Fort Worth, TX
G	5	Ian Sistare	6 ft 3 in (1.91 m)	195 lb (88 kg)	So	Northfield Mt. Hermon	Dublin, NH
G	10	James Foye	6 ft 4 in (1.93 m)	190 lb (86 kg)	So	Phillips Exeter	Hamilton, MA
G	14	Guilien Smith	6 ft 2 in (1.88 m)	200 lb (91 kg)	Jr	Catholic Memorial	West Roxbury, MA
G	15	Brendan Barry	6 ft 2 in (1.88 m)	170 lb (77 kg)	So	Rumson-Fair Haven	Red Bank, NJ
G	20	Ben Swett	6 ft 1 in (1.85 m)	175 lb (79 kg)	Fr	Phillips Exeter	Exeter, NH
G/F	21	Aaryn Rai	6 ft 6 in (1.98 m)	205 lb (93 kg)	Fr	Orangeville Prep	Markham, ON
G	22	Miles Wright	6 ft 5 in (1.96 m)	210 lb (95 kg)	Sr	Tabor Academy	Boston, MA
F	23	Chris Knight	6 ft 7 in (2.01 m)	220 lb (100 kg)	Fr	James Madison Memorial	DeForest, WI
F	32	Joseph Cook	6 ft 8 in (2.03 m)	210 lb (95 kg)	RS Sr	Bishop Amat	Monrovia, CA
F	33	Adrease Jackson	6 ft 8 in (2.03 m)	225 lb (102 kg)	Fr	Santa Margarita Catholic	Santa Margarita, CA

Head coach

- David McLaughlin (Colby)

Assistant coach(es)

- Pete Hutchins (Plymouth State)
- Mike Quinn (Bentley)
- Jabari Trotter (Dartmouth)

Legend

- (C) Team captain
- (S) Suspended
- (I) Ineligible
- (W) Walk-on
- Injured
- Current redshirt

Roster

== Schedule and results ==
Date time, TV	Opponent	Result	Record	Site (attendance) city, state
Regular season
Nov 11, 2017*; 2:00 pm, ESPN3	at Quinnipiac	L 77–78	0–1	TD Bank Sports Center (2,724); Hamden, CT
Nov 14, 2017*; 7:00 pm	Emerson	W 78–43	1–1	Leede Arena (483); Hanover, NH
Nov 22, 2017*; 7:00 pm	Albany	L 73–91	1–2	Leede Arena (420); Hanover, NH
Nov 28, 2017*; 7:00 pm	Loyola (MD)	W 64–63	2–2	Leede Arena (472); Hanover, NH
Dec 2, 2017*; 4:00 pm, ESPN3	at Canisius	L 60–73	2–3	Koessler Center (1,082); Buffalo, NY
Dec 5, 2017*; 4:00 pm	at Sacred Heart	L 73–79	2–4	William H. Pitt Center (375); Fairfield, CT
Dec 8, 2017*; 7:00 pm	at Maine	W 73–66	3–4	Cross Insurance Center (539); Orono, ME
Dec 15, 2017*; 8:00 pm, ESPN3	at UIC	L 60–76	3–5	UIC Pavilion (1,275); Chicago, IL
Dec 19, 2017*; 7:00 pm, ESPNU	at Notre Dame	L 87–97	3–6	Edmund P. Joyce Center (6,837); South Bend, IN
Dec 22, 2017*; 12:00 pm	Bryant	W 75–58	4–6	Leede Arena (647); Hanover, NH
Dec 30, 2017*; 7:00 pm	at New Hampshire; Rivalry	L 66–83	4–7	Lundholm Gym (511); Durham, NH
Jan 6, 2018; 2:00 pm, ESPN3	at Harvard	L 51–61	4–8 (0–1)	Lavietes Pavilion (1,459); Boston, MA
Jan 10, 2018*; 7:00 pm, ILN	Vermont	L 78–91	4–9	Leede Arena (1,263); Hanover, NH
Jan 13, 2018*; 1:00 pm, ACCN Extra	at Boston College	L 72–86	4–10	Conte Forum (4,953); Chestnut Hill, MA
Jan 20, 2018; 7:00 pm, ELVN	Harvard	L 57–62	4–11 (0–2)	Leede Arena (1,630); Hanover, NH
Jan 26, 2018; 7:00 pm, ELVN	at Brown	L 62–64	4–12 (0–3)	Pizzitola Sports Center (1,072); Providence, NJ
Jan 27, 2018; 7:00 pm, ILN	at Yale	L 64–74	4–13 (0–4)	John J. Lee Amphitheater (1,384); New Haven, CT
Feb 2, 2018; 7:00 pm, ESPN3	at Cornell	L 85–86	4–14 (0–5)	Newman Arena (1,149); Ithaca, NY
Feb 3, 2018; 7:00 pm, SNY	at Columbia	L 74–77	4–15 (0–6)	Levien Gymnasium (1,781); New York, NY
Feb 9, 2018; 7:00 pm, ESPN3	Penn	L 61–64	4–16 (0–7)	Leede Arena (659); Hanover, NH
Feb 10, 2018; 7:00 pm, ELVN	Princeton	W 72–56	5–16 (1–7)	Leede Arena (1,396); Hanover, NH
Feb 16, 2018; 7:00 pm, ESPN3	Yale	L 705	5–17 (1–8)	Leede Arena (65–77); Hanover, NH
Feb 17, 2018; 7:00 pm, ILN	Brown	W 66–63	6–17 (2–8)	Leede Arena (767); Hanover, NH
Feb 23, 2018; 7:00 pm, ILN	at Penn	L 46–74	6–18 (2–9)	Palestra (2,355); Philadelphia, PA
Feb 24, 2018; 6:00 pm, ELVN	at Princeton	L 47–64	6–19 (2–10)	Jadwin Gymnasium (2,754); Princeton, NJ
Mar 2, 2018; 7:00 pm, ESPN3	Columbia	W 80–78	7–19 (3–10)	Leede Arena (577); Hanover, NH
Mar 3, 2018; 7:00 pm, ILN	Cornell	L 75–86	7–20 (3–11)	Leede Arena (874); Hanover, NH
*Non-conference game. ^{#}Rankings from AP Poll. (#) Tournament seedings in parentheses. All times are in Eastern Time.
