= 2017–18 Brown Bears men's basketball team =

American college basketball season

2017–18 Brown Bears men's basketball
- Conference: Ivy League
- Record: 11–16 (4–10 Ivy)
- Head coach: Mike Martin (6th season)
- Associate head coach: T. J. Sorrentine
- Assistant coaches: Tyler Simms; Bryson Johnson
- Home arena: Pizzitola Sports Center

2017–18 Ivy League men's basketball standings
	Conf.				Overall
Team	W		L	PCT	W		L	PCT
x-Harvard	12	–	2	.857	18	–	14	.563
x-Penn †	12	–	2	.857	24	–	9	.727
Yale	9	–	5	.643	16	–	15	.516
Cornell	6	–	8	.429	12	–	16	.429
Princeton	5	–	9	.357	13	–	16	.448
Columbia	5	–	9	.357	8	–	19	.296
Brown	4	–	10	.286	11	–	16	.407
Dartmouth	3	–	11	.214	7	–	20	.259
† 2018 Ivy League Tournament winner x – Ivy League co-champions

The 2017–18 Brown Bears men's basketball team represented Brown University during the 2017–18 NCAA Division I men's basketball season. The Bears, led by sixth-year head coach Mike Martin, played their home games at the Pizzitola Sports Center in Providence, Rhode Island as members of the Ivy League. They finished the season 11–16, 4–10 in Ivy League play to finish in seventh place and fail to qualify for the Ivy League tournament.

== Previous season ==
The Bears finished the 2016–17 season 13–17, 4–10 in Ivy League play to finish in a three-way tie for last place. They failed to qualify for the inaugural Ivy League tournament.

== Offseason ==
=== Departures ===
Name	Number	Pos.	Height	Weight	Year	Hometown	Reason for departure
Steven Spieth	3	G	6'6"	200	Senior	San Antonio, TX	Graduated
Tavon Blackmon	5	G	6'0"	180	Senior	Upper Marlboro, MD	Graduated
J. R. Hobbie	12	G	6'4"	190	Senior	Spring Lake, NJ	Graduated
Corey Daugherty	22	G	6'1"	165	Sophomore	Barrington, RI	Left the team for personal reasons
Blake Wilkinson	23	F	6'7"	235	Senior	Bountiful, UT	Graduated
Kyle Harber	24	F	6'6"	190	Junior	Dubuque, IA	Eligibility ended
Miki Ljuboja	30	F	6'8"	225	Junior	North Riverside, IL	Left the team for personal reasons
Brandon Charnov	34	C	6'11"	250	Freshman	Houston, TX	Left the team for personal reasons

=== 2017 recruiting class ===
College recruiting information
Name	Hometown	School	Height	Weight	Commit date
Matt DeWolf #74 C	Barrington, RI	Northfield-Mt. Hermon School	6 ft 9 in (2.06 m)	220 lb (100 kg)	Oct 17, 2016
Matt DeWolf #74 C	Recruit ratings: Scout: Rivals: (58)				
George Mawanda-Kalema #125 SG	Alexandria, VA	Episcopal High School	6 ft 2 in (1.88 m)	170 lb (77 kg)	Oct 15, 2016
George Mawanda-Kalema #125 SG	Recruit ratings: Scout: Rivals: (57)				
Tamenang Choh; SF	Lowell, MA	Brooks School	6 ft 5 in (1.96 m)	200 lb (91 kg)	Aug 25, 2016
Tamenang Choh; SF	Recruit ratings: Scout: Rivals: (NR)				
Desmond Cambridge; SG	Nashville, TN	The Hun School Of Princeton	6 ft 3 in (1.91 m)	180 lb (82 kg)	Oct 13, 2016
Desmond Cambridge; SG	Recruit ratings: Scout: Rivals: (NR)				
Jake Shaper; SG	Houston, TX	The Kinkaid School	6 ft 3 in (1.91 m)	185 lb (84 kg)	
Jake Shaper; SG	Recruit ratings: Scout: Rivals: (NR)				
Overall recruit ranking:
Note: In many cases, Scout, Rivals, 247Sports, On3, and ESPN may conflict in their listings of height and weight.; In these cases, the average was taken. ESPN grades are on a 100-point scale.; Sources: "2017 Team Ranking". Rivals.

=== 2018 recruiting class ===
College recruiting information (2018)
Name	Hometown	School	Height	Weight	Commit date
David Mitchell #78 SF	Belmont, MA	Belmont Hill School	6 ft 5 in (1.96 m)	N/A	
David Mitchell #78 SF	Recruit ratings: Scout: Rivals: (64)				
Thomas Shaughnessy #80 PG	Needham, MA	Needham High School	6 ft 5 in (1.96 m)	N/A	
Thomas Shaughnessy #80 PG	Recruit ratings: Scout: Rivals: (61)				
Overall recruit ranking:
Note: In many cases, Scout, Rivals, 247Sports, On3, and ESPN may conflict in their listings of height and weight.; In these cases, the average was taken. ESPN grades are on a 100-point scale.; Sources: "2018 Team Ranking". Rivals.

== Roster ==
2017–18 Brown Bears men's basketball team
Players
Coaches

Pos.	#	Name	Height	Weight	Year	Previous school	Hometown
G	0	Justin Massey	6 ft 4 in (1.93 m)	220 lb (100 kg)	Sr	American Heritage	Cooper City, FL
F	1	Travis Fuller	6 ft 9 in (2.06 m)	215 lb (98 kg)	Jr	La Costa Canyon	Encinitas, CA
G	2	Brandon Anderson	6 ft 1 in (1.85 m)	170 lb (77 kg)	So	Don Bosco Prep	Mahwah, NJ
G	3	George Mawanda-Kalema	6 ft 3 in (1.91 m)	180 lb (82 kg)	Fr	Episcopal	Burke, VA
G	4	Obi Okolie	6 ft 5 in (1.96 m)	205 lb (93 kg)	Jr	Archbishop Denis O'Connor	Ajax, ON
F	5	Joshua Howard	6 ft 6 in (1.98 m)	205 lb (93 kg)	So	Providence Day School	Charlotte, NC
F	10	David Erebor	6 ft 9 in (2.06 m)	230 lb (104 kg)	So	Our Lady of Carmel School	Sykesville, MD
G	11	Chris Sullivan	6 ft 3 in (1.91 m)	180 lb (82 kg)	Jr	Northfield Mt. Hermon	Wilmette, IL
G	15	Jake Shaper	6 ft 3 in (1.91 m)	195 lb (88 kg)	Fr	The Kinkaid School	Houston, TX
G	20	Zach Hunsaker	6 ft 2 in (1.88 m)	185 lb (84 kg)	So	Orem; Snow College	Orem, UT
G	22	Patrick Triplett	6 ft 4 in (1.93 m)	225 lb (102 kg)	Jr	Bayless	St. Louis, MO
G	24	Desmond Cambridge	6 ft 4 in (1.93 m)	180 lb (82 kg)	Fr	The Hun School (NJ)	Nashville, TN
F	25	Tamenang Choh	6 ft 5 in (1.96 m)	210 lb (95 kg)	Fr	Brooks School	Lowell, MA
F	44	Matt DeWolf	6 ft 9 in (2.06 m)	230 lb (104 kg)	Fr	Northfield Mount Hermon	Barrington, RI

Head coach

- Mike Martin (Brown)

Assistant coach(es)

- Dwayne Pina (Boston College)
- Tyler Simms (Trinity (CT))
- John Linehan (Providence)

Legend

- (C) Team captain
- (S) Suspended
- (I) Ineligible
- (W) Walk-on
- Injured
- Current redshirt

Roster

== Schedule and results ==
Date time, TV	Opponent	Result	Record	Site (attendance) city, state
Non-conference regular season
Nov 11, 2017*; 3:00 pm	Johnson & Wales	W 106–78	1–0	Pizzitola Sports Center (557); Providence, RI
Nov 13, 2017*; 7:00 pm, ESPN3	at Quinnipiac	W 79–72	2–0	TD Bank Sports Center (1,180); Hamden, CT
Nov 19, 2017*; 1:00 pm	at St. Francis Brooklyn	L 74–77	2–1	Generoso Pope Athletic Complex (513); Brooklyn, NY
Nov 22, 2017*; 6:00 pm, ESPN3	at Stony Brook	L 64–77	2–2	Island Federal Credit Union Arena (2,340); Stony Brook, NY
Nov 25, 2017*; 1:00 pm	LIU Brooklyn	W 94–86	3–2	Pizzitola Sports Center (392); Providence, RI
Nov 26, 2017*; 6:00 pm	at Bryant; Ocean State Cup	W 81–67	4–2	Chace Athletic Center (608); Smithfield, RI
Nov 28, 2017*; 7:00 pm	at Rhode Island; Ocean State Cup	L 62–86	4–3	Ryan Center (4,485); Kingston, RI
Dec 2, 2017*; 2:00 pm, ILN	Central Connecticut	L 62–68	4–4	Pizzitola Sports Center (408); Providence, RI
Dec 6 2017*; 7:00 pm, FS2	at Providence; Ocean State Cup	L 72–77 ^{OT}	4–5	Dunkin' Donuts Center (6,087); Providence, RI
Dec 9, 2017*; 2:00 pm, ILN	UMass Lowell	W 89–75	5–5	Pizzitola Sports Center (330); Providence, RI
Dec 22, 2017*; 3:30 pm, ILN	Marist	W 90–69	6–5	Pizzitola Sports Center (751); Providence, RI
Dec 30, 2017*; 12:00 pm, FS1	at Northwestern	L 73–95	6–6	Allstate Arena (6,006); Rosemont, IL
Jan 3, 2018*; 7:00 pm, ESPN3	NJIT	W 70–69	7–6	Pizzitola Sports Center (336); Providence, RI
Ivy League regular season
Jan 12, 2018; 5:30 pm, ELVN	at Yale	L 72–78	7–7 (0–1)	John J. Lee Amphitheater (1,248); New Haven, CT
Jan 19, 2018; 8:00 pm, MyRITV	Yale	W 81–80	8–7 (1–1)	Pizzitola Sports Center (1,553); Providence, RI
Jan 26, 2018; 7:00 pm, ELVN	Dartmouth	W 64–62	9–7 (2–1)	Pizzitola Sports Center (1,072); Providence, RI
Jan 27, 2018; 6:00 pm, NESN+	Harvard	L 77–86	9–8 (2–2)	Pizzitola Sports Center (2,149); Providence, RI
Feb 2, 2018; 7:00 pm, ILN	at Penn	L 90–95	9–9 (2–3)	Palestra (2,163); Philadelphia, PA
Feb 3, 2018; 6:00 pm, ESPN3	at Princeton	W 102–100 ^{OT}	10–9 (3–3)	Jadwin Gymnasium (2,163); Princeton, NJ
Feb 9, 2018; 7:00 pm, ESPN3	Cornell	L 60–78	10–10 (3–4)	Pizzitola Sports Center (780); Providence, RI
Feb 10, 2018; 6:00 pm, MyRITV	Columbia	W 91–88 ^{OT}	11–10 (4–4)	Pizzitola Sports Center (1,038); Providence, RI
Feb 16, 2018; 7:00 pm, NESN	at Harvard	L 58–65	11–11 (4–5)	Lavietes Pavilion (1,486); Boston, MA
Feb 17, 2018; 7:00 pm, ILN	at Dartmouth	L 63–66	11–12 (4–6)	Leede Arena (767); Hanover, NH
Feb 23, 2018; 7:00 pm, SNY	at Columbia	L 82–89	11–13 (4–7)	Levien Gymnasium (1,611); New York, NY
Feb 24, 2018; 6:00 pm, ESPN3	at Cornell	L 68–73	11–14 (4–8)	Newman Arena (1,642); Ithaca, NY
Mar 2, 2018; 7:00 pm, ESPN3	Princeton	L 63–78	11–15 (4–9)	Pizzitola Sports Center (516); Providence, RI
Mar 3, 2018; 6:00 pm, ILN	Penn	L 93–99	11–16 (4–10)	Pizzitola Sports Center (1,192); Providence, RI
*Non-conference game. ^{#}Rankings from AP Poll. (#) Tournament seedings in parentheses. All times are in Eastern Time.
