= 2018 National Invitation Tournament =

Annual NCAA basketball competition

- Season: 2017–18
- Teams: 32
- Finals site: Madison Square Garden, New York City
- Champions: Penn State Nittany Lions (2nd title)
- Runner-up: Utah Utes (3rd title game)
- Semifinalists: Western Kentucky Hilltoppers (4th semifinal); Mississippi State Bulldogs (2nd semifinal)
- Winning coach: Pat Chambers (1st title)
- MVP: Lamar Stevens (Penn State)

The 2018 National Invitation Tournament was a single-elimination tournament of 32 NCAA Division I college men's basketball teams that were not selected to participate in the 2018 NCAA tournament. The first three rounds of the annual tournament were played on campus sites (the host team being the higher-seeded team). The semifinals and championship game were held at Madison Square Garden in New York City.

== Experimental rules ==
In February 2018, the NCAA approved a number of experimental rule changes for use in this tournament:

- Games were played in 10-minute quarters instead of 20-minute halves. The NCAA has used this timing convention for women's basketball since the 2015–16 season.
- As in NCAA women's basketball, as well as the 2017 NIT, there were no "one-and-one" foul shots. Starting with the fifth foul in each quarter, non-shooting fouls by the defense resulted in two free throws, with the exception of administrative technical fouls (for which only one shot is awarded). The 2018 NIT, however, returned to the standard NCAA procedure of treating overtime periods as extensions of the final period of regulation for purposes of team foul accumulation.
- The three-point line changed to the current FIBA distance of 6.75 metres (22 ft 2 in) from the center of the basket, except along the sidelines. Once the arc reaches a distance of 1.02 metres (3 ft 4 in) from the sideline, it becomes a straight line parallel to the sideline. (Note: FIBA's definition of the three-point arc calls for the line to be exactly 0.9 m (2 ft 11 in) from the sideline until it intersects the 6.75 m arc. However, the FIBA court is officially defined as 15 m (49 ft 3 in) wide, slightly narrower than the NCAA standard of 50 ft (15.24 m). On a FIBA court, the closest three-point distance, found along a line parallel to the baseline that passes through the center of the basket, is thus 6.6 m (21 ft 8 in) from the center of the basket. Translating this distance to the NCAA court dimensions results in the line being the stated 1.02 m from the sidelines.)
- The free-throw lane was 16 feet (4.9 m) wide, the same width as in (W)NBA and FIBA rules, instead of the 12 feet (3.7 m) in the current NCAA rules.
- The shot clock was reset to 20 seconds after an offensive rebound.

== Participants ==
=== Automatic qualifiers ===
The following teams were guaranteed berths into the 2018 NIT field by having the best regular-season record in their conference but failing to either win their conference tournament or earn an at-large berth in the 2018 NCAA tournament.

Team	Conference	Record	Appearance	Last bid
Florida Gulf Coast	ASUN	23–11	2nd	2014
Hampton	MEAC	19–15	1st	Never
Harvard	Ivy	18–13	2nd	2011
Louisiana	Sun Belt	27–6	6th	2003
Middle Tennessee	C-USA	24–7	4th	2012
Northern Kentucky	Horizon	22–9	1st	Never
Rider	Metro Atlantic	22–9	2nd	1998
Southeastern Louisiana	Southland	22–11	1st	Never
UC Davis	Big West	22–10	2nd	2015
UNC Asheville	Big South	21–12	2nd	2008
Vermont	America East	27–7	4th	2014
Wagner	Northeast	23–9	4th	2016

Grambling State won the SWAC regular-season title but was banned from the postseason due to low graduation rates and did not participate in the conference tournament. There was thus no automatic qualifier from the SWAC.

=== At-large bids ===
The following 20 teams were also awarded NIT berths.

Team	Conference	Record	Appearance	Last bid
Baylor	Big 12	18–14	6th	2013
Boise State	Mountain West	23–8	6th	2017
Boston College	ACC	19–15	12th	2011
BYU	WCC	24–10	14th	2017
Louisville	ACC	20–13	15th	2006
LSU	SEC	17–14	8th	2014
Marquette	Big East	19–13	16th	2005
Mississippi State	SEC	22–11	9th	2012
Nebraska	Big Ten	22–10	18th	2011
Notre Dame	ACC	20–14	12th	2009
Oklahoma State	Big 12	19–14	12th	2011
Oregon	Pac-12	22–12	11th	2012
Penn State	Big Ten	21–13	11th	2009
Stanford	Pac-12	18–15	9th	2015
Saint Mary's	WCC	28–5	5th	2016
Temple	American	17–15	19th	2015
USC	Pac-12	23–11	5th	1999
Utah	Pac-12	19–11	14th	2017
Washington	Pac-12	20–12	9th	2016
Western Kentucky	C-USA	24–10	14th	2006

=== Bids by conference ===
Conference	Bids
Pac-12	5
ACC	3
Big 12, Big Ten, C-USA, SEC, West Coast	2
America East, American, ASUN, Big East, Big South, Big West, Horizon, Ivy, MAAC, MEAC, Mountain West, Northeast, Southland, Sun Belt	1
Atlantic 10, Big Sky, CAA, MAC, Missouri Valley, Ohio Valley, Patriot, Southern, SWAC, Summit, WAC	0

== Seeds ==
Saint Mary's bracket
Seed	School	Conference	Record	Berth type
1	Saint Mary's	WCC	28–5	At-large
2	Utah	Pac-12	19–11	At-large
3	LSU	SEC	17–14	At-large
4	Boise State	Mountain West	23–8	At-large
5	Washington	Pac-12	20–12	At-large
6	Louisiana	Sun Belt	27–6	Automatic
7	UC Davis	Big West	22–10	Automatic
8	SE Louisiana	Southland	22–11	Automatic

Baylor bracket
Seed	School	Conference	Record	Berth type
1	Baylor	Big 12	18–14	At-large
2	Louisville	ACC	20–13	At-large
3	Middle Tennessee	C-USA	24–7	Automatic
4	Mississippi State	SEC	22–11	At-large
5	Nebraska	Big Ten	22–10	At-large
6	Vermont	America East	27–7	Automatic
7	Northern Kentucky	Horizon	22–9	Automatic
8	Wagner	NEC	23–9	Automatic

USC bracket
Seed	School	Conference	Record	Berth type
1	USC	Pac-12	23–11	At-large
2	Oklahoma State	Big 12	19–14	At-large
3	Stanford	Pac-12	18–15	At-large
4	Western Kentucky	C-USA	24–10	At-large
5	Boston College	ACC	19–15	At-large
6	BYU	WCC	24–10	At-large
7	Florida Gulf Coast	ASUN	23–11	Automatic
8	UNC Asheville	Big South	21–12	Automatic

Notre Dame bracket
Seed	School	Conference	Record	Berth type
1	Notre Dame	ACC	20–14	At-large
2	Marquette	Big East	19–13	At-large
3	Oregon	Pac-12	22–12	At-large
4	Penn State	Big Ten	21–13	At-large
5	Temple	American	17–15	At-large
6	Rider	MAAC	22–9	Automatic
7	Harvard	Ivy	18–13	Automatic
8	Hampton	MEAC	19–15	Automatic

== Schedule ==
The NIT began on Tuesday, March 13, 2018. Due to a conflict at Taco Bell Arena (with the NCAA tournament), Boise State travelled to the University of Washington for their first-round match. The first three rounds were played on campus sites. The semifinals were held on Tuesday, March 27, and the championship game was held on Thursday, March 29, at Madison Square Garden in New York City.

== Bracket ==
First round March 13–14
1	Notre Dame	84
8	Hampton	63
4	Penn State	63
5	Temple	57
3	Oregon	99
6	Rider	86
2	Marquette	67
7	Harvard	60

Second round March 17–18
1	Notre Dame	63
4	Penn State	73
3	Oregon	92
2	Marquette	101

Quarterfinals; March 20
4	Penn State	85
2	Marquette	80

First round March 13–14
1	Baylor	80
8	Wagner	59
4	Mississippi State	66
5	Nebraska	59
3	Middle Tennessee	91
6	Vermont	64
2	Louisville	66
7	Northern Kentucky	58

Second round March 18
1	Baylor	77
4	Mississippi State	78
3	Middle Tennessee	68
2	Louisville	84

Quarterfinals; March 20
4	Mississippi State	79
2	Louisville	56

First round March 13–14
1	USC	103**
8	UNC Asheville	98
4	Western Kentucky	79
5	Boston College	62
3	Stanford	86
6	BYU	83
2	Oklahoma State	80
7	Florida Gulf Coast	68

Second round March 19
1	USC	75
4	Western Kentucky	79
3	Stanford	65
2	Oklahoma State	71

Quarterfinals; March 21
4	Western Kentucky	92
2	Oklahoma State	84

First round March 13–14
1	Saint Mary's	89
8	SE Louisiana	45
4	Boise State^	74
5	Washington	77
3	LSU	84
6	Louisiana	76
2	Utah	69
7	UC Davis	59

Second round March 19
1	Saint Mary's	85
5	Washington	81
3	LSU	71
2	Utah	95

Quarterfinals; March 21
1	Saint Mary's	58
2	Utah	67*

^ Game played at Washington due to Taco Bell Arena hosting first- and second-round 2018 NCAA tournament games.

Semifinals; March 27
4	Penn State	75
4	Mississippi State	60
4	Western Kentucky	64
2	Utah	69

Final; March 29
4	Penn State	82
2	Utah	66

* Denotes overtime period

== Media ==
ESPN, Inc. had exclusive television rights to all of the NIT Games. It was telecast every game across ESPN, ESPN2, ESPNU, and ESPN3. Westwood One had exclusive radio rights to the semifinals and the championship.

== See also ==
- 2018 Women's National Invitation Tournament
