= 2017–18 Yale Bulldogs men's basketball team =

American college basketball season

2017–18 Yale Bulldogs men's basketball
- Conference: Ivy League
- Record: 16–15 (9–5 Ivy)
- Head coach: James Jones (19th season)
- Assistant coaches: Matt Kingsley; Justin Simon; Tobe Carberry
- Home arena: John J. Lee Amphitheater

2017–18 Ivy League men's basketball standings
	Conf.				Overall
Team	W		L	PCT	W		L	PCT
x-Harvard	12	–	2	.857	18	–	14	.563
x-Penn †	12	–	2	.857	24	–	9	.727
Yale	9	–	5	.643	16	–	15	.516
Cornell	6	–	8	.429	12	–	16	.429
Princeton	5	–	9	.357	13	–	16	.448
Columbia	5	–	9	.357	8	–	19	.296
Brown	4	–	10	.286	11	–	16	.407
Dartmouth	3	–	11	.214	7	–	20	.259
† 2018 Ivy League Tournament winner x – Ivy League co-champions

The 2017–18 Yale Bulldogs men's basketball team represented Yale University during the 2017–18 NCAA Division I men's basketball season. The Bulldogs, led by 19th-year head coach James Jones, played their home games at John J. Lee Amphitheater of the Payne Whitney Gymnasium in New Haven, Connecticut as members of the Ivy League. They finished the season 16–15, 9–5 in Ivy League play to finish in third place. They lost in the semifinals of the Ivy League tournament to Penn.

== Previous season ==
The Bulldogs finished the 2016–17 season 18–11, 10–4 in Ivy League play to finish in third place. In the inaugural Ivy League tournament, they defeated Harvard before losing to Princeton in the championship game.

== Offseason ==
=== Departures ===
Name	Number	Pos.	Height	Weight	Year	Hometown	Reason for departure
Anthony Dallier	1	G	6'6"	190	Senior	Wexford, PA	Graduated
Matt Greene	20	F	6'7"	205	Sophomore	Brooklyn, NY	Not on the team roster
A. J. Edwards	25	G	6'5"	190	Senior	Seattle, WA	Graduated
Landon Russell	30	G	6'2"	180	Junior	Fort Worth, TX	Not on the team roster
Sam Downey	44	F	6'9"	230	Senior	Lake Forest, IL	Graduated

=== 2017 recruiting class ===
College recruiting information
Name	Hometown	School	Height	Weight	Commit date
Azar Swain; SG	Boston, MA	The Rivers School	6 ft 1 in (1.85 m)	160 lb (73 kg)	
Azar Swain; SG	Recruit ratings: Scout: Rivals: (59)				
Jalen Gabbidon; SG	Harrisburg, PA	Glenelg Country School	6 ft 5 in (1.96 m)	185 lb (84 kg)	Aug 7, 2016
Jalen Gabbidon; SG	Recruit ratings: Scout: Rivals: (NR)				
Paul Atkinson; PF	Palm Beach Gardens, FL	Westminster Academy	6 ft 8 in (2.03 m)	220 lb (100 kg)	Sep 4, 2016
Paul Atkinson; PF	Recruit ratings: Scout: Rivals: (NR)				
Wyatt Yess; PF	Ballwin, MO	Parkway West High School	6 ft 8 in (2.03 m)	220 lb (100 kg)	May 6, 2016
Wyatt Yess; PF	Recruit ratings: Scout: Rivals: (NR)				
Jameel Alausa; SF	Chicago, IL	University of Chicago Laboratory High School	6 ft 7 in (2.01 m)	210 lb (95 kg)	Apr 19, 2016
Jameel Alausa; SF	Recruit ratings: Scout: Rivals: (NR)				
Overall recruit ranking:
Note: In many cases, Scout, Rivals, 247Sports, On3, and ESPN may conflict in their listings of height and weight.; In these cases, the average was taken. ESPN grades are on a 100-point scale.; Sources: "2017 Team Ranking". Rivals.

=== 2018 Recruiting class ===
College recruiting information (2018)
Name	Hometown	School	Height	Weight	Commit date
Eze Dike; PG	Meriden, NH	Kimball Union Academy	6 ft 2 in (1.88 m)	N/A	
Eze Dike; PG	Recruit ratings: Scout: Rivals: (62)				
Overall recruit ranking:
Note: In many cases, Scout, Rivals, 247Sports, On3, and ESPN may conflict in their listings of height and weight.; In these cases, the average was taken. ESPN grades are on a 100-point scale.; Sources: "2018 Team Ranking". Rivals.

== Roster ==
2017–18 Yale Bulldogs men's basketball team
Players
Coaches

Pos.	#	Name	Height	Weight	Year	Previous school	Hometown
G	00	Jalen Gabbidon	6 ft 5 in (1.96 m)	190 lb (86 kg)	Fr	Glenelg Country School	Harrisburg, PA
G	2	Eric Monroe	6 ft 2 in (1.88 m)	175 lb (79 kg)	So	St. Augustine	San Diego, CA
G	3	Alex Copeland	6 ft 3 in (1.91 m)	175 lb (79 kg)	Jr	Harvard-Westlake	Los Angeles, CA
F	4	Noah Yates	6 ft 5 in (1.96 m)	195 lb (88 kg)	Sr	Point Pleasant Beach	Point Pleasant Beach, NJ
G	5	Azar Swain	6 ft 0 in (1.83 m)	185 lb (84 kg)	Fr	The Rivers School	Brockton, MA
F	10	Eric Anderson	6 ft 7 in (2.01 m)	220 lb (100 kg)	Sr	Haverford School	West Chester, PA
G	11	Makai Mason	6 ft 1 in (1.85 m)	185 lb (84 kg)	Sr	Hotchkiss School	Greenfield, MA
G	13	Trey Phills	6 ft 2 in (1.88 m)	185 lb (84 kg)	Jr	Charlotte Christian	Charlotte, NC
F	14	Jameel Alausa	6 ft 7 in (2.01 m)	210 lb (95 kg)	Fr	Univ. of Chicago Lab	Chicago, IL
F	20	Paul Atkinson	6 ft 10 in (2.08 m)	220 lb (100 kg)	Fr	Westminster Academy	West Palm Beach, FL
F	22	Austin Williams	6 ft 8 in (2.03 m)	235 lb (107 kg)	So	Bolles School	Jacksonville, FL
F	23	Jordan Bruner	6 ft 9 in (2.06 m)	205 lb (93 kg)	So	Spring Valley	Columbia, SC
G	24	Miye Oni	6 ft 7 in (2.01 m)	205 lb (93 kg)	So	Viewpoint; Suffield Academy	Porter Ranch, CA
F	32	Blake Reynolds	6 ft 7 in (2.01 m)	240 lb (109 kg)	Jr	Jackson	Jackson, MO
F	33	Wyatt Yess	6 ft 8 in (2.03 m)	220 lb (100 kg)	Fr	Parkway West	St. Louis, MO
G	34	Thomas Ryan	6 ft 4 in (1.93 m)	185 lb (84 kg)	Jr	Hotchkiss School	New York City, NY

Head coach

- James Jones (Albany)

Assistant coach(es)

- Matt Kingsley (Wesleyan)
- Justin Simon (Yale)
- Tobe Carberry (Vermont)

Legend

- (C) Team captain
- (S) Suspended
- (I) Ineligible
- (W) Walk-on
- Injured
- Current redshirt

Roster

== Schedule and results ==
Date time, TV	Rank^{#}	Opponent^{#}	Result	Record	Site (attendance) city, state
Non-conference regular season
Nov 10, 2017*; 9:00 pm, FSN		at Creighton; CBE Hall of Fame Classic	L 76–92	0–1	CenturyLink Center (16,611); Omaha, NE
Nov 12, 2017*; 6:00 pm, BTN+		at Wisconsin; CBE Hall of Fame Classic	L 61–89	0–2	Kohl Center (17,142); Madison, WI
Nov 14, 2017*; 7:00 pm		South Carolina State; CBE Hall of Fame Classic	W 88–54	1–2	John J. Lee Amphitheater (811); New Haven, CT
Nov 17, 2017*; 7:00 pm		at Albany	L 72–80	1–3	SEFCU Arena (2,717); Albany, NY
Nov 19, 2017*; 2:00 pm		Curry	W 107–42	2–3	John J. Lee Amphitheater (684); New Haven, CT
Nov 22, 2017*; 1:30 pm		at Alcorn State; CBE Hall of Fame Classic	W 87–73	3–3	Davey Whitney Complex (177); Lorman, MS
Nov 25, 2017*; 2:00 pm, ESPN3		Vermont	L 73–79	3–4	John J. Lee Amphitheater (1,644); New Haven, CT
Nov 27, 2017*; 7:00 pm		at Delaware	W 76–66	4–4	Bob Carpenter Center (2,119); Newark, DE
Nov 29, 2017*; 8:00 pm, ESPN3		Bryant	W 84–67	5–4	John J. Lee Amphitheater (711); New Haven, CT
Dec 2, 2017*; 8:00 pm, FSSW		at No. 23 TCU	L 66–92	5–5	Schollmaier Arena (5,970); Fort Worth, TX
Dec 6, 2017*; 7:05 pm		at Lehigh	W 86–77	6–5	Stabler Arena (776); Bethlehem, PA
Dec 9, 2017*; 12:00 pm, ESPNU		at St. Bonaventure	L 67–75	6–6	Reilly Center (3,913); Olean, NY
Dec 12, 2017*; 7:00 pm, ESPN3		at Iona	L 67–83	6–7	Hynes Athletic Center (1,553); New Rochelle, NY
Dec 22, 2017*; 7:00 pm, ILDN		Monmouth	L 64–85	6–8	John J. Lee Amphitheater (1,553); New Haven, CT
Dec 30, 2017*; 4:00 pm, ESPN3		at Kennesaw State	W 89–74	7–8	KSU Convocation Center (1,200); Kennesaw, GA
Jan 6, 2018*; 7:00 pm, ACCN Extra		Georgia Tech	L 60–74	7–9	McCamish Pavilion (6,630); Atlanta, GA
Ivy League regular season
Jan 12, 2018; 5:30 pm, ELVN		Brown	W 78–72	8–9 (1–0)	John J. Lee Amphitheater (1,248); New Haven, CT
Jan 19, 2018; 8:00 pm, MyRITV		at Brown	L 80–81	8–10 (1–1)	Pizzitola Sports Center (1,553); Providence, RI
Jan 26, 2018; 7:00 pm, ILDN		Harvard	L 52–54	8–11 (1–2)	John J. Lee Amphitheater (2,532); New Haven, CT
Jan 27, 2018; 7:00 pm, ILDN		Dartmouth	W 74–64	9–11 (2–2)	John J. Lee Amphitheater (1,384); New Haven, CT
Feb 2, 2018; 7:00 pm, ILDN		Princeton	L 73–76	9–12 (2–3)	Jadwin Gymnasium (2,093); Princeton, NJ
Feb 3, 2018; 7:00 pm, ILDN		Penn	L 50–59	9–13 (2–4)	Palestra (2,518); Philadelphia, PA
Feb 9, 2018; 7:00 pm, SNY		Columbia	W 88–84	10–13 (3–4)	John J. Lee Amphitheater (1,084); New Haven, CT
Feb 10, 2018; 7:00 pm, ILDN		Cornell	W 74–65	11–13 (4–4)	John J. Lee Amphitheater (1,514); New Haven, CT
Feb 16, 2018; 7:00 pm, ILDN		at Dartmouth	W 705	12–13 (5–4)	Leede Arena (77–65); Hanover, NH
Feb 17, 2018; 9:30 pm, ESPNU		at Harvard	L 49–64	12–14 (5–5)	Lavietes Pavilion (1,636); Cambridge, MA
Feb 23, 2018; 7:00 pm, ESPN3		at Cornell	W 82–80	13–14 (6–5)	Newman Arena (1,864); Ithaca, NY
Feb 24, 2018; 8:30 pm, SNY		at Columbia	W 83–73	14–14 (7–5)	Levien Gymnasium (1,722); New York, NY
Mar 2, 2018; 7:00 pm, ELVN		Penn	W 80-79	15–14 (8–5)	John J. Lee Amphitheater (1,380); New Haven, CT
Mar 3, 2018; 7:00 pm, ESPN3		Princeton	W 94–90 ^{OT}	16–14 (9–5)	John J. Lee Amphitheater (1,677); New Haven, CT
Ivy League tournament
Mar 10, 2018; 3:00 pm, ESPNU	(3)	at (2) Penn; Semifinals	L 57–80	16–15	Palestra; Philadelphia, PA
*Non-conference game. ^{#}Rankings from AP Poll. (#) Tournament seedings in parentheses. All times are in Eastern Time.
