= 2017–18 Penn Quakers men's basketball team =

American college basketball season

2017–18 Penn Quakers men's basketball

Ivy League regular season co-champions Ivy League Tournament champions

NCAA tournament, First Round
- Conference: Ivy League
- Record: 24–9 (12–2 Ivy)
- Head coach: Steve Donahue (3rd season)
- Assistant coaches: Nat Graham; Ira Bowman; Joe Mihalich, Jr.
- Home arena: The Palestra

2017–18 Ivy League men's basketball standings
| | Conf. | | | | Overall |
| Team | W | | L | PCT | W | | L | PCT |
|---|---|---|---|---|---|---|---|---|
| x-Harvard | 12 | – | 2 | .857 | 18 | – | 14 | .563 |
| x-Penn † | 12 | – | 2 | .857 | 24 | – | 9 | .727 |
| Yale | 9 | – | 5 | .643 | 16 | – | 15 | .516 |
| Cornell | 6 | – | 8 | .429 | 12 | – | 16 | .429 |
| Princeton | 5 | – | 9 | .357 | 13 | – | 16 | .448 |
| Columbia | 5 | – | 9 | .357 | 8 | – | 19 | .296 |
| Brown | 4 | – | 10 | .286 | 11 | – | 16 | .407 |
| Dartmouth | 3 | – | 11 | .214 | 7 | – | 20 | .259 |
† 2018 Ivy League Tournament winner x – Ivy League co-champions

The 2017–18 Penn Quakers men's basketball team represented the University of Pennsylvania during the 2017–18 NCAA Division I men's basketball season. The Quakers, led by third-year head coach Steve Donahue, played their home games at The Palestra as members of the Ivy League. They finished the season 24–9, 12–2 in Ivy League play to win a share of the Ivy League regular season championship with Harvard. In the Ivy League tournament, they defeated Yale and Harvard to become Ivy League Tournament champions. They received the Ivy League's automatic bid to the NCAA tournament where they lost in the first round to Kansas.

== Previous season ==
The Quakers finished the 2016–17 season 13–15, 6–8 in Ivy League play to finish in fourth place. They lost in the semifinals of the inaugural Ivy League tournament to Princeton.

== Offseason ==
=== Departures ===
| Name | Number | Pos. | Height | Weight | Year | Hometown | Notes |
|---|---|---|---|---|---|---|---|
| Dylan Jones | 13 | F | 6'8" | 215 | Senior | Houston, TX | Graduate transferred to Rice |
| Shawn Simmons | 23 | G | 6'4" | 170 | Junior | Virginia Beach, VA | Eligibility ended |
| Matt Howard | 24 | G | 6'4" | 185 | Senior | Columbia, SC | Graduated |

=== 2017 recruiting class ===
College recruiting
| Name | Hometown | School | Height | Weight | Commit date |
|---|---|---|---|---|---|
| Jordan Salzman; PG | Locust Valley, NY | Locust Valley High School | 5 ft 10 in (1.78 m) | 150 lb (68 kg) | Mar 2, 2015 |
| Jordan Salzman; PG | Recruit ratings: Scout: Rivals: (NR) | | | | |
| Eddie Scott; SF | Bowie, MD | Gonzaga College High School | 6 ft 6 in (1.98 m) | 195 lb (88 kg) | Jul 29, 2016 |
| Eddie Scott; SF | Recruit ratings: Scout: Rivals: (NR) | | | | |
| Jelani Willams; SG | Washington, DC | Sidwell Friends School | 6 ft 5 in (1.96 m) | 185 lb (84 kg) | Sep 4, 2016 |
| Jelani Willams; SG | Recruit ratings: Scout: Rivals: (NR) | | | | |
Overall recruit ranking:
Note: In many cases, Scout, Rivals, 247Sports, On3, and ESPN may conflict in their listings of height and weight.; In these cases, the average was taken. ESPN grades are on a 100-point scale.; Sources: "2017 Team Ranking". Rivals.

=== 2018 recruiting class ===
College recruiting (2017)
| Name | Hometown | School | Height | Weight | Commit date |
|---|---|---|---|---|---|
| Eze Dike #78 PG | Meridian, NH | Kimball Union Academy | 6 ft 2 in (1.88 m) | 150 lb (68 kg) | Mar 2, 2015 |
| Eze Dike #78 PG | Recruit ratings: Scout: Rivals: (62) | | | | |
Overall recruit ranking:
Note: In many cases, Scout, Rivals, 247Sports, On3, and ESPN may conflict in their listings of height and weight.; In these cases, the average was taken. ESPN grades are on a 100-point scale.; Sources: "2018 Team Ranking". Rivals.

== Roster ==
2017–18 Penn Quakers men's basketball team
Players
Coaches

| Pos. | # | Name | Height | Weight | Year | Previous school | Hometown |
|---|---|---|---|---|---|---|---|
| F | 0 | Max Rothschild | 6 ft 8 in (2.03 m) | 225 lb (102 kg) | Jr | New Hampton | Chicago, IL |
| G | 1 | Ray Jerome | 6 ft 2 in (1.88 m) | 185 lb (84 kg) | So | Cheshire Academy | Latham, NY |
| G | 2 | Antonio Woods | 6 ft 1 in (1.85 m) | 195 lb (88 kg) | Jr | Summit Country Day | Cincinnati, OH |
| G | 3 | Jake Silpe | 6 ft 2 in (1.88 m) | 185 lb (84 kg) | So | Cherry Hill East | Cherry Hill, NJ |
| G | 4 | Darnell Foreman | 6 ft 1 in (1.85 m) | 170 lb (77 kg) | Sr | Pitman | Camden, NJ |
| G | 5 | Jackson Donahue | 6 ft 0 in (1.83 m) | 185 lb (84 kg) | Jr | Northfield Mount Hermon | Pawcatuck, CT |
| G | 10 | Caleb Wood | 6 ft 4 in (1.93 m) | 180 lb (82 kg) | Sr | Galena; Lassen CC | Reno, NV |
| G | 11 | Tyler Hamilton | 6 ft 4 in (1.93 m) | 210 lb (95 kg) | Jr | Cheshire Academy | Atlanta, GA |
| G | 12 | Devon Goodman | 6 ft 0 in (1.83 m) | 160 lb (73 kg) | So | Germantown Academy | Laverock, PA |
| G | 13 | Eddie Scott | 6 ft 6 in (1.98 m) | 195 lb (88 kg) | Fr | Gonzaga College | Washington, D.C. |
| F | 14 | Sam Jones | 6 ft 7 in (2.01 m) | 185 lb (84 kg) | Sr | Gilbert Christian | Gilbert, AZ |
| F | 15 | Zack Kaminsky | 6 ft 6 in (1.98 m) | 205 lb (93 kg) | So | Pace Academy | Atlanta, GA |
| G | 20 | Matt MacDonald | 6 ft 5 in (1.96 m) | 200 lb (91 kg) | RS Sr | Canisius; Fairleigh Dickinson | Eggertsville, NY |
| G | 21 | Ryan Betley | 6 ft 5 in (1.96 m) | 185 lb (84 kg) | So | Downington West | Downingtown, PA |
| F | 22 | Jakub Mijakowski | 6 ft 7 in (2.01 m) | 230 lb (104 kg) | So | Mountain Mission School | Warsaw, Poland |
| G | 23 | Jelani Williams | 6 ft 5 in (1.96 m) | 195 lb (88 kg) | Fr | Sidwell Friends | Washington, D.C. |
| F | 24 | Jarrod Simmons | 6 ft 8 in (2.03 m) | 215 lb (98 kg) | Fr | Moon Area | Crescent, PA |
| F | 25 | A. J. Brodeur | 6 ft 8 in (2.03 m) | 220 lb (100 kg) | So | Northfield Mount Hermon | Northborough, MA |
| C | 35 | Mark Jackson | 7 ft 3 in (2.21 m) | 250 lb (113 kg) | Fr | SLC East | Salt Lake City, UT |
| F | 40 | Dan Dwyer | 6 ft 8 in (2.03 m) | 220 lb (100 kg) | Sr | Fenwick | River Forest, IL |
| C | 44 | Collin McManus | 6 ft 10 in (2.08 m) | 240 lb (109 kg) | Jr | Northfield Mount Hermon | Bedford, NH |

Head coach

- Steve Donahue (Ursinus)

Assistant coach(es)

- Nat Graham (Penn)
- Ira Bowman (Penn)
- Joe Mihalich, Jr. (Nazareth)

Legend

- (C) Team captain
- (S) Suspended
- (I) Ineligible
- (W) Walk-on
- Injured
- Current redshirt

Roster

== Schedule and results ==
| Date time, TV | Rank^{#} | Opponent^{#} | Result | Record | Site (attendance) city, state |
Regular season
| Nov 11, 2017*; 1:00 pm | | at Fairfield | L 72–80 | 0–1 | Webster Bank Arena; Bridgeport, CT |
| Nov 13, 2017*; 7:00 pm, NBCSP | | La Salle; Big 5 | L 71–75 ^{2OT} | 0–2 | Palestra (2,073); Philadelphia, PA |
| Nov 15, 2017*; 7:00 pm, ESPN3 | | Navy | W 66–45 | 1–2 | Palestra (2,051); Philadelphia, PA |
| Nov 18, 2017*; 11:30 am | | Penn State Brandywine | W 99–40 | 2–2 | Palestra (2,007); Philadelphia, PA |
| Nov 20, 2017*; 5:00 pm | | vs. Northern Illinois; Gulf Coast Showcase quarterfinals | W 93–80 | 3–2 | Germain Arena (823); Estero, FL |
| Nov 21, 2017*; 7:30 pm | | vs. Towson; Gulf Coast Showcase semifinals | L 71–79 | 3–3 | Germain Arena (841); Estero, FL |
| Nov 22, 2017*; 5:00 pm | | vs. UMKC; Gulf Coast Showcase 3rd place game | W 68–65 | 4–3 | Germain Arena (868); Estero, FL |
| Nov 25, 2017*; 7:00 pm, ESPN3 | | at Monmouth | W 101–96 ^{4OT} | 5–3 | OceanFirst Bank Center (2,425); West Long Branch, NJ |
| Nov 29, 2017*; 7:00 pm, FS2 | | at No. 4 Villanova; Big 5 | L 62–90 | 5–4 | Jake Nevin Field House (2,200); Villanova, PA |
| Dec 4, 2017*; 7:00 pm | | at Howard | W 81–68 | 6–4 | Burr Gymnasium (425); Washington, DC |
| Dec 6, 2017*; 8:00 pm | | at Lafayette | W 73–68 | 7–4 | Kirby Sports Center (1,328); Easton, PA |
| Dec 9, 2017*; 3:00 pm, NBCSN | | at Dayton | W 78–70 | 8–4 | UD Arena (13,350); Dayton, OH |
| Dec 27, 2017*; 7:00 pm, ESPN3 | | Delaware State | W 105–52 | 9–4 | Palestra (2,011); Philadelphia, PA |
| Dec 29, 2017*; 4:00 pm | | Toledo | L 72–85 | 9–5 | Palestra (2,316); Philadelphia, PA |
| Jan 5, 2018; 7:00 pm, NBCSP+ | | Princeton; Rivalry | W 76–70 | 10–5 (1–0) | Palestra (3,789); Philadelphia, PA |
| Jan 12, 2018; 8:00 pm | | Cornell | W 69–61 | 11–5 (2–0) | Palestra (2,176); Philadelphia, PA |
| Jan 13, 2018; 7:00 pm | | Columbia | W 77–71 | 12–5 (3–0) | Palestra (2,084); Philadelphia, PA |
| Jan 20, 2018*; 2:00 pm, NBCSP | | Temple; Big 5 | L 51–60 | 12–6 | Palestra (7,233); Philadelphia, PA |
| Jan 27, 2018*; 7:00 pm, NBCSP | | Saint Joseph's; Big 5 | W 67–56 | 13–6 | Palestra (7,682); Philadelphia, PA |
| Feb 2, 2018; 7:00 pm | | Brown | W 95–90 | 14–6 (4–0) | Palestra (2,518); Philadelphia, PA |
| Feb 3, 2018; 7:00 pm, NBCSP | | Yale | W 59–50 | 15–6 (5–0) | Palestra (2,518); Philadelphia, PA |
| Feb 6, 2018; 6:00 pm, ESPNU | | at Princeton; Rivalry | W 82–65 | 16-6 (6-0) | Jadwin Gymnasium (2,115); Princeton, NJ |
| Feb 9, 2018; 7:00 pm, ESPN3 | | at Dartmouth | W 64–61 | 17–6 (7–0) | Leede Arena (659); Hanover, NH |
| Feb 10, 2018; 4:00 pm | | at Harvard | L 67–76 | 17–7 (7–1) | Lavietes Pavilion (1,636); Boston, MA |
| Feb 16, 2018; 7:00 pm | | at Columbia | W 74–62 | 18–7 (8–1) | Levien Gymnasium (2,008); New York, NY |
| Feb 17, 2018; 8:00 pm | | at Cornell | W 79–71 | 19–7 (9–1) | Newman Arena (2,283); Ithaca, NY |
| Feb 23, 2018; 7:00 pm | | Dartmouth | W 74–46 | 20–7 (10–1) | Palestra (2,355); Philadelphia, PA |
| Feb 24, 2018; 7:00 pm | | Harvard | W 74–71 | 21–7 (11–1) | Palestra (6,586); Philadelphia, PA |
| Mar 2, 2018; 7:00 pm, ELVN | | at Yale | L 79–80 | 21–8 (11–2) | John J. Lee Amphitheater (1,380); New Haven, CT |
| Mar 3, 2018; 7:00 pm | | at Brown | W 99–93 | 22–8 (12–2) | Pizzitola Sports Center (1,192); Providence, RI |
Ivy League tournament
| Mar 10, 2018; 3:00 pm, ESPNU | (2) | (3) Yale; Semifinals | W 80–57 | 23–8 | Palestra; Philadelphia, PA |
| Mar 11, 2018; 12:00 pm, ESPN2 | (2) | (1) Harvard; Championship | W 68–65 | 24–8 | Palestra (5,564); Philadelphia, PA |
NCAA tournament
| Mar 15, 2018*; 2:00 pm, TBS | (16 MW) | vs. (1 MW) No. 4 Kansas; First Round | L 60–76 | 24–9 | Intrust Bank Arena (14,390); Wichita, KS |
*Non-conference game. ^{#}Rankings from AP Poll. (#) Tournament seedings in parentheses. MW=Midwest. All times are in Eastern Time.
