= 2017–18 Cornell Big Red men's basketball team =

American college basketball season

2017–18 Cornell Big Red men's basketball
- Conference: Ivy League
- Record: 12–16 (6–8 Ivy)
- Head coach: Brian Earl (2nd season)
- Assistant coaches: Jon Jaques; Donovan Williams; Adam Gierlach
- Home arena: Newman Arena

2017–18 Ivy League men's basketball standings
| | Conf. | | | | Overall |
| Team | W | | L | PCT | W | | L | PCT |
|---|---|---|---|---|---|---|---|---|
| x-Harvard | 12 | – | 2 | .857 | 18 | – | 14 | .563 |
| x-Penn † | 12 | – | 2 | .857 | 24 | – | 9 | .727 |
| Yale | 9 | – | 5 | .643 | 16 | – | 15 | .516 |
| Cornell | 6 | – | 8 | .429 | 12 | – | 16 | .429 |
| Princeton | 5 | – | 9 | .357 | 13 | – | 16 | .448 |
| Columbia | 5 | – | 9 | .357 | 8 | – | 19 | .296 |
| Brown | 4 | – | 10 | .286 | 11 | – | 16 | .407 |
| Dartmouth | 3 | – | 11 | .214 | 7 | – | 20 | .259 |
† 2018 Ivy League Tournament winner x – Ivy League co-champions

The 2017–18 Cornell Big Red men's basketball team represented Cornell University during the 2017–18 NCAA Division I men's basketball season. The Big Red, led by second-year head coach Brian Earl, played their home games at Newman Arena in Ithaca, New York as members of the Ivy League. They finished the season 12–16, 6–8 in Ivy League play to finish in fourth place. They lost in the semifinals of the Ivy League tournament to Harvard.

== Previous season ==
The Big Red finished the 2016–17 season 8–21, 4–10 in Ivy League play to finish in a three-way tie for last place. They failed to qualify for the inaugural Ivy League tournament.

== Offseason ==
=== Departures ===
| Name | Number | Pos. | Height | Weight | Year | Hometown | Reason for departure |
|---|---|---|---|---|---|---|---|
| David Onuorah | 0 | F | 6'9" | 230 | Senior | Lithonia, GA | Graduate transferred to Connecticut |
| Darryl Smith | 1 | G | 6'2" | 180 | Senior | Chesapeake, VA | Graduated |
| Donovan Wright | 3 | F | 6'5' | 200 | Sophomore | Easton, PA | Left the team for personal reasons |
| Robert Hatter | 5 | G | 6'2" | 180 | Senior | Houston, TX | Graduated |
| Desmond Fleming | 11 | G | 5'11" | 180 | Senior | The Woodlands, TX | Graduated |
| Braxston Bunce | 15 | C | 6'11" | 250 | Senior | Kelowna, BC | Graduated |
| JoJo Fallas | 25 | G | 5'11" | 175 | Senior | Los Angeles, CA | Graduated |
| Joseph Bayless | 30 | F | 6'8" | 240 | Sophomore | Dallas, TX | Left the team for personal reasons |

=== Incoming transfers ===
| Name | Number | Pos. | Height | Weight | Year | Hometown | Previous School |
|---|---|---|---|---|---|---|---|
| Steven Julian | 33 | F | 6'6" | 190 | Junior | Louisville, KY | Junior college transferred from Kaskaskia College |

=== 2017 recruiting class ===
College recruiting information
| Name | Hometown | School | Height | Weight | Commit date |
|---|---|---|---|---|---|
| Terrance McBride #109 SG | Chatsworth, CA | Sierra Canyon High School | 6 ft 0 in (1.83 m) | 155 lb (70 kg) | Dec 5, 2016 |
| Terrance McBride #109 SG | Recruit ratings: Scout: Rivals: (59) | | | | |
| Bryan Knapp #125 SG | Washington, D.C. | Charles E. Smith Jewish Day School | 6 ft 0 in (1.83 m) | N/A | Sep 15, 2016 |
| Bryan Knapp #125 SG | Recruit ratings: Scout: Rivals: (57) | | | | |
| Jimmy Boeheim; PF | Syracuse, NY | Jamesville-DeWitt High School | 6 ft 7 in (2.01 m) | 210 lb (95 kg) | Feb 28, 2017 |
| Jimmy Boeheim; PF | Recruit ratings: Scout: Rivals: (57) | | | | |
| Jake Kuhn #116 SF | Bethesda, MD | St. Maria Goretti High School | 6 ft 6 in (1.98 m) | 180 lb (82 kg) | Oct 1, 2016 |
| Jake Kuhn #116 SF | Recruit ratings: Scout: Rivals: (55) | | | | |
| Riley Voss; SF | Cincinnati, OH | Moeller High School | 6 ft 5 in (1.96 m) | N/A | Sep 26, 2016 |
| Riley Voss; SF | Recruit ratings: Scout: Rivals: (NR) | | | | |
Overall recruit ranking:
Note: In many cases, Scout, Rivals, 247Sports, On3, and ESPN may conflict in their listings of height and weight.; In these cases, the average was taken. ESPN grades are on a 100-point scale.; Sources: "2017 Team Ranking". Rivals.

== Roster ==
2017–18 Cornell Big Red men's basketball team
Players
Coaches

| Pos. | # | Name | Height | Weight | Year | Previous school | Hometown |
|---|---|---|---|---|---|---|---|
| G | 1 | Kyle Brown | 6 ft 3 in (1.91 m) | 170 lb (77 kg) | Sr | Newport HS | Bellevue, WA |
| G/F | 2 | Will Bathurst | 6 ft 3 in (1.91 m) | 188 lb (85 kg) | Sr | Olean HS | Olean, NY |
| F | 3 | Jimmy Boeheim | 6 ft 8 in (2.03 m) | 215 lb (98 kg) | Fr | Jamesville-DeWitt HS | Fayetteville, NY |
| G | 4 | Troy Whiteside | 6 ft 4 in (1.93 m) | 188 lb (85 kg) | Jr | The Webb School | Knoxville, TN |
| G | 5 | Bryan Knapp | 6 ft 1 in (1.85 m) | 170 lb (77 kg) | Fr | Charles E. Smith Jewish Day | Washington, D.C. |
| G | 10 | Matt Morgan | 6 ft 2 in (1.88 m) | 174 lb (79 kg) | Jr | Cox Mill HS | Concord, NC |
| G | 11 | Terrance McBride | 6 ft 2 in (1.88 m) | 170 lb (77 kg) | Fr | Sierra Canyon HS | Lynwood, CA |
| F | 12 | Jordan Abdur-Ra'oof | 6 ft 8 in (2.03 m) | 220 lb (100 kg) | Sr | Gonzaga College HS | Rockville, MD |
| F | 13 | Stone Gettings | 6 ft 9 in (2.06 m) | 234 lb (106 kg) | Jr | Loyola HS | Calabasas, CA |
| F | 21 | Riley Voss | 6 ft 6 in (1.98 m) | 220 lb (100 kg) | Fr | Moeller HS | Milford, OH |
| F | 22 | Josh Warren | 6 ft 8 in (2.03 m) | 223 lb (101 kg) | So | Downington West HS | Downingtown, PA |
| G | 23 | Joel Davis | 6 ft 2 in (1.88 m) | 176 lb (80 kg) | Jr | Wayne Country Day School | Goldsboro, NC |
| G/F | 24 | Pat Smith | 6 ft 5 in (1.96 m) | 204 lb (93 kg) | Sr | Archbishop Wood Catholic HS | Chalfont, PA |
| G/F | 25 | Jake Kuhn | 6 ft 6 in (1.98 m) | 195 lb (88 kg) | Fr | St. Maria Goretti HS | Bethesda, MD |
| G | 32 | Jack Gordon | 6 ft 5 in (1.96 m) | 189 lb (86 kg) | Jr | St. Mark's School | Dallas, TX |
| F | 33 | Steven Julian | 6 ft 6 in (1.98 m) | 200 lb (91 kg) | Jr | Male HS; Kaskaskia College | Louisville, KY |

Head coach

- Brian Earl (Princeton)

Assistant coach(es)

- Jon Jaques (Cornell)
- Donovan Williams (Park)
- Adam Gierlach (Rice)

Legend

- (C) Team captain
- (S) Suspended
- (I) Ineligible
- (W) Walk-on
- Injured
- Current redshirt

Roster

== Schedule and results ==
| Date time, TV | Rank^{#} | Opponent^{#} | Result | Record | Site (attendance) city, state |
Exhibition
| Nov 4, 2017*; 7:00 pm | | SUNY Cortland | W 96–70 | | Newman Arena; Ithaca, NY |
Non-conference regular season
| Nov 10, 2017*; 7:00 pm, ACCN Extra | | at Syracuse | L 45–77 | 0–1 | Carrier Dome (21,720); Syracuse, NY |
| Nov 13, 2017*; 7:00 pm, ILN | | Binghamton | W 94–84 | 1–1 | Newman Arena (968); Ithaca, NY |
| Nov 16, 2017*; 7:00 pm | | at Colgate | L 61–72 | 1–2 | Cotterell Court (661); Hamilton, NY |
| Nov 19, 2017*; 1:00 pm, ESPN3 | | at UMass Lowell | L 78–98 | 1–3 | Tsongas Center (1,689); Lowell, MA |
| Nov 24, 2017*; 4:00 pm, ILN | | Toledo | W 80–77 | 2–3 | Newman Arena (704); Ithaca, NY |
| Nov 27, 2017*; 7:00 pm | | at Duquesne | W 78–71 | 3–3 | Palumbo Center (1,204); Pittsburgh, PA |
| Dec 2, 2017*; 4:00 pm | | at Northeastern | L 66–84 | 3–4 | Matthews Arena (974); Boston, MA |
| Dec 16, 2017*; 2:00 pm | | at Longwood | W 69–62 | 4–4 | Willett Hall (215); Farmville, VA |
| Dec 20, 2017*; 7:00 pm, ILN | | Lafayette | W 80–71 | 5–4 | Newman Arena (475); Ithaca, NY |
| Dec 23, 2017*; 1:00 pm, ILN | | Niagara | L 86–89 | 5–5 | Newman Arena (977); Ithaca, NY |
| Dec 28, 2017*; 2:00 pm | | at Delaware | L 96–97 ^{OT} | 5–6 | Bob Carpenter Center (2,450); Newark, DE |
| Dec 30, 2017*; 3:30 pm, SECN | | at Auburn | L 77–98 | 5–7 | Auburn Arena (8,493); Auburn, AL |
| Jan 5, 2018*; 5:30 pm, ILN | | Central Penn | W 93–69 | 6–7 | Newman Arena (444); Ithaca, NY |
Ivy League regular season
| Jan 12, 2018; 8:00 pm, ILN | | at Penn | L 61–69 | 6–8 (0–1) | Palestra (2,176); Philadelphia, PA |
| Jan 13, 2018; 7:00 pm, ESPN3 | | at Princeton | L 54–91 | 6–9 (0–2) | Jadwin Gymnasium (2,635); Princeton, NJ |
| Jan 20, 2018; 7:00 pm, SNY | | at Columbia | L 62–88 | 6–10 (0–3) | Levien Gymnasium (2,302); New York, NY |
| Jan 27, 2018; 4:00 pm, ILN | | Columbia | W 82–81 | 7–10 (1–3) | Newman Arena (2,379); Ithaca, NY |
| Feb 2, 2018; 7:00 pm, ESPN3 | | Dartmouth | W 86–85 | 8–10 (2–3) | Newman Arena (1,149); Ithaca, NY |
| Feb 3, 2018; 6:00 pm, ELVN | | Harvard | L 73–76 | 8–11 (2–4) | Newman Arena (1,188); Ithaca, NY |
| Feb 9, 2018; 7:00 pm, ESPN3 | | at Brown | W 78–60 | 9–11 (3–4) | Pizzitola Sports Center (1,038); Providence, RI |
| Feb 10, 2018; 7:00 pm, ILN | | at Yale | L 65–74 | 9–12 (3–5) | John J. Lee Amphitheater (1,514); New Haven, CT |
| Feb 16, 2018; 8:00 pm, ILN | | Princeton | W 107–101 ^{3OT} | 10–12 (4–5) | Newman Arena (1,193); Ithaca, NY |
| Feb 17, 2018; 6:30 pm, ILN | | Penn | L 71–79 | 10–13 (4–6) | Newman Arena (868); Ithaca, NY |
| Feb 23, 2018; 7:00 pm, ESPN3 | | Yale | L 80–82 | 10–14 (4–7) | Newman Arena (1,864); Ithaca, NY |
| Feb 24, 2018; 6:00 pm, ESPN3 | | Brown | W 73–68 | 11–14 (5–7) | Newman Arena (1,642); Ithaca, NY |
| Mar 2, 2018; 7:00 pm, ESPN3 | | at Harvard | L 88–98 ^{2OT} | 11–15 (5–8) | Lavietes Pavilion (1,636); Cambridge, MA |
| Mar 3, 2018; 7:00 pm, ILN | | at Dartmouth | W 86–75 | 12–15 (6–8) | Leede Arena (874); Hanover, NH |
Ivy League tournament
| Mar 10, 2018; 12:30 pm, ESPNU | (4) | vs. (1) Harvard; Semifinals | L 55–74 | 12–16 | Palestra; Philadelphia, PA |
*Non-conference game. ^{#}Rankings from AP Poll. (#) Tournament seedings in parentheses. All times are in Eastern Time.
