= 2017–18 Middle Tennessee Blue Raiders men's basketball team =

American college basketball season

2017–18 Middle Tennessee Blue Raiders men's basketball

C-USA regular season champions

NIT, Second Round
- Conference: Conference USA
- Record: 25–8 (16–2 C-USA)
- Head coach: Kermit Davis (16th season)
- Assistant coaches: Greg Grensing; Win Case; Ronnie Hamilton
- Home arena: Murphy Center

2017–18 Conference USA men's basketball standings
	Conf.				Overall
Team	W		L	PCT	W		L	PCT
Middle Tennessee	16	–	2	.889	25	–	8	.758
Old Dominion	15	–	3	.833	25	–	7	.781
Western Kentucky	14	–	4	.778	27	–	11	.711
Marshall †	12	–	6	.667	25	–	11	.694
UTSA	11	–	7	.611	20	–	15	.571
UAB	10	–	8	.556	20	–	13	.606
North Texas	8	–	10	.444	20	–	18	.526
FIU	8	–	10	.444	14	–	18	.438
Southern Miss	7	–	11	.389	16	–	18	.471
Louisiana Tech	7	–	11	.389	17	–	16	.515
Florida Atlantic	6	–	12	.333	12	–	19	.387
UTEP	6	–	12	.333	11	–	20	.355
Rice	4	–	14	.222	7	–	24	.226
Charlotte	2	–	16	.111	6	–	23	.207
† 2018 C-USA Tournament winner

The 2017–18 Middle Tennessee Blue Raiders men's basketball team represented Middle Tennessee State University during the 2017–18 NCAA Division I men's basketball season. The Blue Raiders, led by 16th-year head coach Kermit Davis, played their home games at the Murphy Center in Murfreesboro, Tennessee as members of Conference USA. They finished the season 25–8 overall, 16–2 in C-USA play to win the regular season championship. In the C-USA tournament, they were defeated in the quarterfinals by Southern Miss in overtime. As a regular season conference champion who failed to win their conference tournament, the Blue Raiders received an automatic bid to the National Invitation Tournament, where they defeated Vermont in the first round before losing to Louisville in the second round.

The season marked the first time in the program's history that the Blue Raiders were ranked in the AP Top 25 during the season, coming in at No. 24 on the week of February 19.

Head coach Kermit Davis left the school on March 19, 2018 to accept the head coaching job at Ole Miss. He finished at Middle Tennessee with a 16-year record of 332–188. On March 24, the Blue Raiders named UNC Asheville head coach Nick McDevitt as the team's new head coach.

== Previous season ==
The Blue Raiders finished the 2016–17 season 27–4, 17–1 in C-USA play to win the regular season championship. In the C-USA tournament, they defeated UTSA, UTEP, and Marshall to win the 2017 C-USA Tournament. As a result, they received the conference's automatic bid to the NCAA tournament. As the No. 12 seed in the South region, they defeated 5-seeded Minnesota in the first round before losing in the second round to 4-seeded Butler. The team also had several winning streaks during the season, winning eight games in a row in non-conference schedule, 10 games in a row to start conference play and a new school record, then 11 games in a row from mid-conference play all the way through winning the conference tournament and into the NCAA tournament before losing to Butler. The team finished the season with a 31–5, 17–1 record-setting new school and conference records for wins in a season and in conference play, and had another NCAA tournament upset for the second straight year.

== Offseason ==
=== Departures ===
Name	Number	Pos.	Height	Weight	Year	Hometown	Notes
Xavier Habersham	4	F	6'6"	208	RS senior	Dublin, GA	Graduated
JaCorey Williams	22	F	6'8"	220	RS senior	Birmingham, AL	Graduated
Quavius Copeland	24	G	6'1"	178	Junior	Greenville, SC	Transferred to North Carolina A&T
Reggie Upshaw Jr.	30	F	6'8"	228	Senior	Chattanooga, TN	Graduated
Stephen Strachan	31	G	6'2"	200	RS junior	Nassau, Bahamas	Walk-on; left the team for personal reasons
Aldonis Foote	45	G/F	6'5"	213	Senior	Peoria, IL	Graduated

=== Incoming transfers ===
Name	Number	Pos.	Height	Weight	Year	Hometown	Previous school
James Hawthorne	4	F	6'7"	205	Junior	Prentiss, MS	Junior college transferred from Southwest Mississippi Community College.
David Simmons	21	G	6'3"	209	Junior	Henderson, KY	Junior college transferred from Tallahassee Community College.
Antonio Green		G	6'2"	165	Junior	Tupelo, MS	Transferred from Texas–Rio Grande Valley. Under NCAA transfer rules, Green will have to sit out in the 2017–18 season. Will have two years of eligibility left.

=== 2017 recruiting class ===
College recruiting
Name	Hometown	School	Height	Weight	Commit date
T.J. Massenburg; PF	Snellville, GA	Shiloh High School	6 ft 8 in (2.03 m)	N/A	Oct 2, 2016
T.J. Massenburg; PF	Recruit ratings: Scout: Rivals: (NR)				
Therren Shelton-Szmidt; SG	Mississauga, ON	Shiloh High School	6 ft 5 in (1.96 m)	175 lb (79 kg)	Oct 9, 2016
Therren Shelton-Szmidt; SG	Recruit ratings: Scout: Rivals: (NR)				
Overall recruit ranking:
Note: In many cases, Scout, Rivals, 247Sports, On3, and ESPN may conflict in their listings of height and weight.; In these cases, the average was taken. ESPN grades are on a 100-point scale.; Sources: "2017 Team Ranking". Rivals.

=== 2018 recruiting class ===
College recruiting (2018)
Name	Hometown	School	Height	Weight	Commit date
Junior Farquhar; PG	Orangeville, ON	Orangeville Prep	6 ft 3 in (1.91 m)	185 lb (84 kg)	Jul 18, 2018
Junior Farquhar; PG	Recruit ratings: Scout: Rivals: (NR)				
Anthony Crump; PG	Canton, MI	Plymouth High School	6 ft 7 in (2.01 m)	175 lb (79 kg)	May 8, 2018
Anthony Crump; PG	Recruit ratings: Scout: Rivals: (NR)				
Jayce Johnson; SG	Buffalo, NY	Canisius High School	6 ft 5 in (1.96 m)	205 lb (93 kg)	Jul 27, 2018
Jayce Johnson; SG	Recruit ratings: Scout: Rivals: (NR)				
Overall recruit ranking:
Note: In many cases, Scout, Rivals, 247Sports, On3, and ESPN may conflict in their listings of height and weight.; In these cases, the average was taken. ESPN grades are on a 100-point scale.; Sources: "2018 Team Ranking". Rivals.

== Roster ==
2017–18 Middle Tennessee Blue Raiders men's basketball team
Players
Coaches

Pos.	#	Name	Height	Weight	Year	Previous school	Hometown
G	0	Tyrik Dixon	6 ft 1 in (1.85 m)	184 lb (83 kg)	So	Southwest Christian Academy	Bentonville, AR
F	1	Brandon Walters	6 ft 10 in (2.08 m)	250 lb (113 kg)	RS Sr	Howard; Walters State CC	Chattanooga, TN
G	2	Antwain Johnson	6 ft 2 in (1.88 m)	197 lb (89 kg)	Jr	Malone	Greenwood, FL
G	3	Donovan Sims (W)	6 ft 0 in (1.83 m)	165 lb (75 kg)	Fr	Blackman	Murfreesboro, TN
F	4	James Hawthorne	6 ft 7 in (2.01 m)	205 lb (93 kg)	Jr	Prentiss; Southwest Mississippi CC	Prentiss, MS
F	5	Nick King	6 ft 7 in (2.01 m)	225 lb (102 kg)	Sr	Memphis East	Memphis, TN
G	10	Will Slatten	6 ft 4 in (1.93 m)	166 lb (75 kg)	RS Fr	Moore County	Sparta, TN
G	11	Edward Jr. Simpson	6 ft 2 in (1.88 m)	195 lb (88 kg)	Sr	St. Martin	Ocean Springs, MS
G	12	Therren Shelton-Szmidt	6 ft 5 in (1.96 m)	190 lb (86 kg)	Fr	Hamilton Heights Christian Academy	Mississauga, ON
G	14	Chase Miller (W)	6 ft 0 in (1.83 m)	185 lb (84 kg)	RS So	Shelton	Dallas, TX
F	15	T. J. Massenburg	6 ft 8 in (2.03 m)	220 lb (100 kg)	Fr	Shiloh	Snellville, GA
G	20	Giddy Potts	6 ft 2 in (1.88 m)	217 lb (98 kg)	Sr	Athens	Athens, AL
G	21	David Simmons	6 ft 3 in (1.91 m)	195 lb (88 kg)	Jr	Henderson County	Henderson, KY
F	25	Karl Gamble	6 ft 9 in (2.06 m)	224 lb (102 kg)	Jr	A.C. Flora	Columbia, SC
F	35	Davion Thomas	6 ft 9 in (2.06 m)	215 lb (98 kg)	RS Fr	Northside	Columbus, GA
G		Antonio Green (redshirt)	6 ft 2 in (1.88 m)	180 lb (82 kg)	Jr	Tupelo; Texas–Rio Grande Valley	Tupelo, MS

Head coach

- Kermit Davis (Mississippi State)

Assistant coach(es)

- Greg Grensing (Texas State)
- Win Case (Oklahoma City)
- Ronnie Hamilton (UNC Pembroke)

Legend

- (C) Team captain
- (S) Suspended
- (I) Ineligible
- (W) Walk-on
- Injured
- Current redshirt

Roster
Last update: October 9, 2017

== Schedule and results ==
Date time, TV	Rank^{#}	Opponent^{#}	Result	Record	High points	High rebounds	High assists	Site (attendance) city, state
Exhibition
Nov 2, 2017*; 7:30 pm		Arkansas Fort Smith	W 85–55		25 – Potts	6 – King	5 – Johnson	Murphy Center (2,634); Murfreesboro, TN
Non-conference regular season
Nov 10, 2017*; 11:00 am		Trevecca Nazarene	W 104–52	1–0	17 – King	6 – King	3 – 3 tied	Murphy Center (8,227); Murfreesboro, TN
Nov 13, 2017*; 7:00 pm		at Murray State	W 72–67	2–0	31 – King	8 – Potts	3 – Tied	CFSB Center (3,854); Murray, KY
Nov 16, 2017*; 6:30 pm, Stadium		Belmont	L 63–69	2–1	21 – King	8 – Walters	6 – Potts	Murphy Center (5,366); Murfreesboro, TN
Nov 18, 2017*; 3:00 pm		at Tennessee State	W 75–65	3–1	20 – King	7 – Walters	5 – Dixon	Gentry Complex (1,850); Nashville, TN
Nov 21, 2017*; 6:30 pm, Stadium		Florida Gulf Coast	W 85–72	4–1	25 – King	10 – Dixon	6 – Dixon	Murphy Center (5,017); Murfreesboro, TN
Dec 2, 2017*; 6:00 pm		at Florida Gulf Coast	W 81–76	5–1	32 – King	11 – King	4 – King	Alico Arena (4,633); Fort Myers, FL
Dec 6, 2017*; 7:00 pm		at Vanderbilt	W 66–63	6–1	23 – King	6 – Tied	5 – Potts	Memorial Gymnasium (8,739); Nashville, TN
Dec 9, 2017*; 5:00 pm, Stadium		Ole Miss	W 77–58	7–1	25 – King	6 – King	9 – Dixon	Murphy Center (8,806); Murfreesboro, TN
Dec 16, 2017*; 5:00 pm, SECN		vs. Auburn; BHM JAM	L 70–76	7–2	19 – Potts	6 – Tied	3 – Tied	Legacy Arena (7,209); Birmingham, AL
Dec 22, 2017*; 4:30 pm, ESPNU		vs. Princeton; Diamond Head Classic quarterfinals	W 69–67	8–2	18 – King	5 – 3 tied	4 – Tied	Stan Sheriff Center (7,669); Honolulu, HI
Dec 23, 2017*; 3:30 pm, ESPN2		vs. USC; Diamond Head Classic semifinals	L 84–89	8–3	28 – King	11 – King	4 – Dixon	Stan Sheriff Center (5,811); Honolulu, HI
Dec 25, 2017*; 7:30 pm, ESPNU		vs. No. 15 Miami (FL); Diamond Head Classic 3rd place game	L 81–84	8–4	28 – King	8 – King	4 – Johnson	Stan Sheriff Center (6,062); Honolulu, HI
Conference USA regular season
Dec 30, 2017; 4:00 pm, Stadium		at UAB	W 63–60	9–4 (1–0)	30 – King	8 – King	6 – Simmons	Bartow Arena (4,143); Birmingham, AL
Jan 4, 2018; 6:00 pm		at FIU	W 71–66 ^{OT}	10–4 (2–0)	25 – Potts	10 – King	3 – Simpson	FIU Arena (468); Miami, FL
Jan 6, 2018; 4:00 pm		at Florida Atlantic	W 61–57	11–4 (3–0)	16 – King	11 – King	2 – Dixon	FAU Arena; Boca Raton, FL
Jan 11, 2018; 8:00 pm, CBSSN		Louisiana Tech	W 72–57	12–4 (4–0)	22 – King	10 – King	5 – Dixon	Murphy Center (4,418); Murfreesboro, TN
Jan 13, 2018; 5:00 pm, ESPN3		Southern Miss	W 69–49	13–4 (5–0)	19 – Walters	10 – King	4 – Simmons	Murphy Center (4,871); Murfreesboro, TN
Jan 18, 2018; 7:00 pm, beIN		at Marshall	L 63–73	13–5 (5–1)	15 – Tied	9 – King	3 – Simmons	Cam Henderson Center (5,320); Huntington, WV
Jan 20, 2018; 6:00 pm, Stadium		at Western Kentucky	W 66–62	14–5 (6–1)	28 – King	9 – King	3 – King	E.A. Diddle Arena (7,759); Bowling Green, KY
Jan 25, 2018; 6:30 pm, Stadium		UTSA	W 75–51	15–5 (7–1)	22 – King	14 – Walters	3 – Tied	Murphy Center (5,010); Murfreesboro, TN
Jan 27, 2018; 6:00 pm, Stadium		UTEP	W 81–50	16–5 (8–1)	17 – Walters	12 – Walters	5 – Dixon	Murphy Center (5,227); Murfreesboro, TN
Feb 1, 2018; 7:00 pm, Stadium		at Old Dominion	W 66–59	17–5 (9–1)	18 – Johnson	11 – King	4 – Johnson	Ted Constant Convocation Center (7,297); Norfolk, VA
Feb 3, 2018; 6:00 pm		at Charlotte	W 78–73	18–5 (10–1)	24 – King	12 – King	3 – King	Dale F. Halton Arena (4,078); Charlotte, NC
Feb 8, 2018; 6:30 pm, Stadium		Rice	W 94–75	19–5 (11–1)	22 – Potts	7 – Potts	8 – Dixon	Murphy Center (5,602); Murfreesboro, TN
Feb 10, 2018; 5:00 pm		North Texas	W 79–73	20–5 (12–1)	32 – King	11 – King	7 – Johnson	Murphy Center (6,209); Murfreesboro, TN
Feb 15, 2018; 7:00 pm		at Southern Miss	W 72–63	21–5 (13–1)	20 – King	11 – King	4 – Tied	Reed Green Coliseum (2,062); Hattiesburg, MS
Feb 17, 2018; 6:00 pm, Stadium		at Louisiana Tech	W 87–70	22–5 (14–1)	25 – King	11 – Walters	4 – Sims	Thomas Assembly Center (4,847); Ruston, LA
Feb 24, 2018; 6:00 pm, Stadium	No. 24	UAB	W 79–54	23–5 (15–1)	22 – King	6 – Tied	4 – Sims	Murphy Center (9,717); Murfreesboro, TN
Mar 1, 2018; 7:00 pm, CBSSN	No. 24	Western Kentucky	W 82–64	24–5 (16–1)	18 – Tied	11 – Walters	6 – Sims	Murphy Center (11,307); Murfreesboro, TN
Mar 3, 2018; 6:00 pm, Stadium	No. 24	Marshall	L 67–76	24–6 (16–2)	20 – Walters	9 – King	4 – Dixon	Murphy Center (10,050); Murfreesboro, TN
Conference USA tournament
Mar 8, 2018; 6:00 pm, Stadium	(1)	vs. (9) Southern Miss; Quarterfinals	L 68–71 ^{OT}	24–7	17 – King	9 – King	4 – Potts	The Ford Center at The Star; Frisco, TX
NIT
Mar 13, 2018*; 7:00 pm, ESPNU	(3)	(6) Vermont; First Round – Baylor Bracket	W 91–64	25–7	25 – Potts	12 – King	4 – King	Murphy Center (5,010); Murfreesboro, TN
Mar 18, 2018*; 5:30 pm, ESPN2	(3)	at (2) Louisville; Second Round – Baylor Bracket	L 68–84	25–8	24 – King	6 – King	3 – Potts	KFC Yum! Center (13,050); Louisville, KY
*Non-conference game. ^{#}Rankings from AP Poll. (#) Tournament seedings in parentheses. All times are in Central Time.
