= 2018 Ivy League men's basketball tournament =

- Classification: Division I
- Season: 2017–18
- Teams: 4
- Site: Palestra; Philadelphia, Pennsylvania
- Champions: Penn (1st title)
- Winning coach: Steve Donahue (1st title)
- MVP: A. J. Brodeur (Penn)
- Television: ESPNU, ESPN2

2017–18 Ivy League men's basketball standings
	Conf.				Overall
Team	W		L	PCT	W		L	PCT
x-Harvard	12	–	2	.857	18	–	14	.563
x-Penn †	12	–	2	.857	24	–	9	.727
Yale	9	–	5	.643	16	–	15	.516
Cornell	6	–	8	.429	12	–	16	.429
Princeton	5	–	9	.357	13	–	16	.448
Columbia	5	–	9	.357	8	–	19	.296
Brown	4	–	10	.286	11	–	16	.407
Dartmouth	3	–	11	.214	7	–	20	.259
† 2018 Ivy League Tournament winner x – Ivy League co-champions

The 2018 Ivy League men's basketball tournament was the postseason men's basketball tournament for the Ivy League of the 2017–18 NCAA Division I men's basketball season. It was held on March 10 and 11, 2018, at the Palestra on the campus of the University of Pennsylvania in Philadelphia. Penn defeated Harvard in the championship game to win the tournament and received the conference's automatic bid to the NCAA tournament. Harvard earned an automatic bid to the 2018 National Invitation Tournament.

== Seeds ==
Only the top four teams in the Ivy League regular-season standings qualify for the tournament and were seeded according to their records in conference play, resulting in a Shaughnessy playoff.

Seed	School	Record	Tiebreaker
1	Harvard	12–2	1–1 vs Penn, 2–0 vs Yale
2	Pennsylvania	12–2	1–1 vs Harvard, 1–1 vs Yale
3	Yale	9–5	
4	Cornell	6–8	

== Schedule ==
Session	Game	Time	Matchup	Score	Television	Attendance
Semifinals – Saturday, March 10
1	1	12:30 pm	No. 1 Harvard vs. No. 4 Cornell	74–55	ESPNU	
1	2	3:00 pm	No. 2 Penn vs. No. 3 Yale	80–57	ESPNU	
Championship – Sunday, March 11
2	3	12:00 pm	No. 1 Harvard vs. No. 2 Penn	65–68	ESPN2	
Game times in Eastern Time. Rankings denote tournament seeding.

== Bracket ==
Semifinals; Saturday, March 10; The Palestra
1	Harvard	74
4	Cornell	55
2	Penn	80
3	Yale	57

Final; Sunday, March 11; The Palestra
1	Harvard	65
2	Penn	68

== See also ==
- 2018 Ivy League women's basketball tournament
