= 2017–18 Princeton Tigers men's basketball team =

American college basketball season

2017–18 Princeton Tigers men's basketball
- Conference: Ivy League
- Record: 13–16 (5–9 Ivy)
- Head coach: Mitch Henderson (7th season)
- Assistant coaches: Kerry Kittles; Brett MacConnell; Skye Ettin
- Home arena: Jadwin Gymnasium

2017–18 Ivy League men's basketball standings
	Conf.				Overall
Team	W		L	PCT	W		L	PCT
x-Harvard	12	–	2	.857	18	–	14	.563
x-Penn †	12	–	2	.857	24	–	9	.727
Yale	9	–	5	.643	16	–	15	.516
Cornell	6	–	8	.429	12	–	16	.429
Princeton	5	–	9	.357	13	–	16	.448
Columbia	5	–	9	.357	8	–	19	.296
Brown	4	–	10	.286	11	–	16	.407
Dartmouth	3	–	11	.214	7	–	20	.259
† 2018 Ivy League Tournament winner x – Ivy League co-champions

The 2017–18 Princeton Tigers men's basketball team represented Princeton University during the 2017–18 NCAA Division I men's basketball season. The Tigers, led by seventh-year head coach Mitch Henderson, played their home games at Jadwin Gymnasium as members of the Ivy League. They finished the season 13–16, 5–9 in Ivy League play to finish in a tie for fifth place and failed to qualify for the Ivy League tournament.

== Previous season ==
The Tigers finished the 2016–17 season 23–7, 14–0 in Ivy League play to win the Ivy League regular season championship. They defeated Penn and Yale to win the inaugural Ivy League tournament championship. As a result, they earned the conference's automatic bid to the NCAA tournament as the No. 12 seed in the West Region. There they lost in the First Round to #5 seed Notre Dame.

== Offseason ==
=== Departures ===
Name	Number	Pos.	Height	Weight	Year	Hometown	Reason for departure
Spencer Weisz	10	F	6'4"	209	Senior	Florham Park, NJ	Graduated
Khyan Rayner	14	G	5'11"	163	Senior	Portland, OR	Graduated
Henry Caruso	21	F	6'4"	200	Junior	San Mateo, CA	Graduate transferred to Santa Clara
Steven Cook	25	F	6'5"	197	Senior	Winnetka, IL	Graduated
Hans Brase	30	F	6'8"	225	Senior	Clover, SC	Graduated
Peter Miller	31	F	6'10"	235	Senior	Winchester, MA	Graduated

=== 2017 recruiting class ===
College recruiting information
Name	Hometown	School	Height	Weight	Commit date
Sebastian Much #51 PF	San Juan Capistrano, CA	JSerra Catholic High School	6 ft 7 in (2.01 m)	200 lb (91 kg)	Oct 1, 2016
Sebastian Much #51 PF	Recruit ratings: Scout: Rivals: (78)				
Jerome Desrosiers #75 PF	Montreal, QE	Northfield-Mt. Hermon School	6 ft 6 in (1.98 m)	215 lb (98 kg)	Jun 7, 2016
Jerome Desrosiers #75 PF	Recruit ratings: Scout: Rivals: (73)				
Elijah Barnes #95 PF	Middletown, NJ	Mater Dei High School	6 ft 6 in (1.98 m)	180 lb (82 kg)	Jun 28, 2016
Elijah Barnes #95 PF	Recruit ratings: Scout: Rivals: (NR)				
Ryan Schwieger; SG	Matthews, SC	Weddington High School	6 ft 6 in (1.98 m)	N/A	Aug 22, 2016
Ryan Schwieger; SG	Recruit ratings: Scout: Rivals: (NR)				
Overall recruit ranking:
Note: In many cases, Scout, Rivals, 247Sports, On3, and ESPN may conflict in their listings of height and weight.; In these cases, the average was taken. ESPN grades are on a 100-point scale.; Sources: "2017 Team Ranking". Rivals.

=== 2018 recruiting class ===
College recruiting information (2018)
Name	Hometown	School	Height	Weight	Commit date
Jaelin Llewellyn #24 PG	Lynchburg, VA	Virginia Episcopal School	6 ft 2 in (1.88 m)	160 lb (73 kg)	Jul 24, 2017
Jaelin Llewellyn #24 PG	Recruit ratings: Scout: Rivals: (78)				
Overall recruit ranking:
Note: In many cases, Scout, Rivals, 247Sports, On3, and ESPN may conflict in their listings of height and weight.; In these cases, the average was taken. ESPN grades are on a 100-point scale.; Sources: "2018 Team Ranking". Rivals.

== Roster ==
2017–18 Princeton Tigers men's basketball team
Players
Coaches

Pos.	#	Name	Height	Weight	Year	Previous school	Hometown
G	0	Aaron Young	6 ft 0 in (1.83 m)	180 lb (82 kg)	Sr	Virginia Episcopal School	Falls Church, VA
F	1	Vittorio Reynoso-Avila	6 ft 5 in (1.96 m)	200 lb (91 kg)	So	La Mirada	La Mirada, CA
G	2	Jose Morales	5 ft 9 in (1.75 m)	165 lb (75 kg)	So	Hun School	Miramar, FL
G	3	Devin Cannady	6 ft 1 in (1.85 m)	185 lb (84 kg)	Jr	Marian	Mishawaka, IN
F	4	Mike LeBlanc	6 ft 6 in (1.98 m)	195 lb (88 kg)	Sr	New Hampton	Dover, DE
G	5	Amir Bell	6 ft 3 in (1.91 m)	190 lb (86 kg)	Sr	East Brunswick	East Brunswick, NJ
G	10	Charlie Bagin	6 ft 0 in (1.83 m)	160 lb (73 kg)	Fr	Don Bosco	Glen Ridge, NJ
G	11	Elias Berbari	6 ft 2 in (1.88 m)	180 lb (82 kg)	Jr	Harborfields	Greenlawn, NY
G	12	Myles Stephens	6 ft 5 in (1.96 m)	205 lb (93 kg)	Jr	St. Andrew's	Lawrenceville, NJ
F	13	Will Gladson	6 ft 10 in (2.08 m)	255 lb (116 kg)	So	Chaminade College Prep	Chesterfield, MO
G	15	Ryan Schwiger	6 ft 6 in (1.98 m)	200 lb (91 kg)	Fr	Weddington	Matthews, NC
F	22	Jerome Desrosier	6 ft 7 in (2.01 m)	225 lb (102 kg)	Fr	Northfield Mount Hermon	Saint-Hyacinthe, QC
F	23	Elijah Barnes	6 ft 8 in (2.03 m)	210 lb (95 kg)	Fr	Mater Dei	Middletown, NJ
F	31	Noah Bramlage	6 ft 9 in (2.06 m)	220 lb (100 kg)	Jr	Ottawa-Glandorf	Glandorf, OH
F	33	Sebastian Much	6 ft 8 in (2.03 m)	225 lb (102 kg)	Fr	JSerra Catholic	Laguna Niguel, CA
C	34	Richmond Aririguzoh	6 ft 9 in (2.06 m)	220 lb (100 kg)	So	Trenton Catholic	Ewing, NJ
F	35	Alec Brennan	6 ft 11 in (2.11 m)	230 lb (104 kg)	Sr	Milton Academy	Weston, MA

Head coach

- Mitch Henderson (Princeton)

Assistant coach(es)

- Kerry Kittles (Villanova)
- Brett MacConnell (Rutgers)
- Skye Ettin (TCNJ)

Legend

- (C) Team captain
- (S) Suspended
- (I) Ineligible
- (W) Walk-on
- Injured
- Current redshirt

Roster

== Schedule and results ==
Date time, TV	Opponent	Result	Record	Site (attendance) city, state
Regular season
Nov 12, 2017*; 6:00 pm, CBSSN	at Butler	L 75–85	0–1	Hinkle Fieldhouse (8,470); Indianapolis, IN
Nov 15, 2017*; 7:00 pm, NBCSP	BYU	L 56–65	0–2	Jadwin Gymnasium (1,842); Princeton, NJ
Nov 18, 2017*; 7:00 pm	at Saint Joseph's	L 58–71	0–3	Hagan Arena (4,121); Philadelphia, PA
Nov 22, 2017*; 7:00 pm, ILN	Lafayette	W 60–46	1–3	Jadwin Gymnasium (1,575); Princeton, NJ
Nov 26, 2017*; 2:00 pm	at Fairleigh Dickinson	W 83–76	2–3	Rothman Center (642); Hackensack, NJ
Nov 29, 2017*; 8:00 pm, NBCSP+	Lehigh	L 76–85	2–4	Jadwin Gymnasium (1,292); Princeton, NJ
Dec 2, 2017*; 8:00 pm, ESPNU	vs. No. 10 Miami (FL); Hoophall Miami Invitational	L 52–80	2–5	American Airlines Arena (8,426); Miami, FL
Dec 6, 2017*; 7:00 pm	at George Washington	L 60–71	2–6	Charles E. Smith Center (2,004); Washington, D.C.
Dec 12, 2017*; 7:00 pm, ESPN3	Monmouth	W 69–58	3–6	Jadwin Gymnasium (1,549); Princeton, NJ
Dec 16, 2017*; 10:00 pm	at Cal Poly	W 80–60	4–6	Robert A. Mott Athletics Center (2,360); San Luis Obispo, CA
Dec 19, 2017*; 11:00 pm, P12N	at USC; Diamond Head Classic non-bracket game	W 103–93 ^{OT}	5–6	Galen Center (4,041); Los Angeles, CA
Dec 22, 2017*; 5:30 pm, ESPNU	vs. Middle Tennessee; Diamond Head Classic quarterfinals	L 67–69	5–7	Stan Sheriff Center (7,669); Honolulu, HI
Dec 23, 2017*; 7:00 pm, ESPN3	vs. Akron; Diamond Head Classic consolation 2nd round	W 64–62	6–7	Stan Sheriff Center (5,811); Honolulu, HI
Dec 25, 2017*; 2:30 pm, ESPNU	at Hawaii; Diamond Head Classic 5th place game	W 77–63	7–7	Stan Sheriff Center (6,698); Honolulu, HI
Jan 5, 2018; 7:00 pm, NBCSP+	at Penn; Rivalry	L 70–76	7–8 (0–1)	Palestra (3,789); Philadelphia, PA
Jan 12, 2018; 8:00 pm, NBCSP	Columbia	W 72–56	8–8 (1–1)	Jadwin Gymnasium (1,779); Princeton, NJ
Jan 13, 2018; 7:00 pm, ESPN3	Cornell	W 91–54	9–8 (2–1)	Jadwin Gymnasium (2,635); Princeton, NJ
Jan 28, 2018*; 1:00 pm, ILN	Rowan	W 86–50	10–8	Jadwin Gymnasium (1,522); Princeton, NJ
Feb 2, 2018; 7:00 pm, NBCSP	Yale	W 76–73	11–8 (3–1)	Jadwin Gymnasium (2,093); Princeton, NJ
Feb 3, 2018; 6:00 pm, ESPN3	Brown	L 100–102 ^{OT}	11–9 (3–2)	Jadwin Gymnasium (2,163); Princeton, NJ
Feb 6, 2018; 6:00 pm, ESPNU	Penn; Rivalry	L 65–82	11–10 (3–3)	Jadwin Gymnasium (2,115); Princeton, NJ
Feb 9, 2018; 7:00 pm, ESPNU	at Harvard	L 51–	11–11 (3–4)	Lavietes Pavilion (1,636); Cambridge, MA
Feb 10, 2018; 7:00 pm, ELVN	at Dartmouth	L 56–72	11–12 (3–5)	Leede Arena (1,396); Hanvoer, NH
Feb 16, 2018; 8:00 pm, ILN	at Cornell	L 101–107 ^{3OT}	11–13 (3–6)	Newman Arena (1,193); Ithaca, NY
Feb 17, 2018; 7:00 pm, SNY	at Columbia	L 60–85	11–14 (3–7)	Levien Gymnasium (1,831); New York, NY
Feb 23, 2018; 7:00 pm, ESPNU	Harvard	L 66–72 ^{OT}	11–15 (3–8)	Jadwin Gymnasium (2,739); Princeton, NJ
Feb 24, 2018; 6:00 pm, ELVN	Dartmouth	W 64–47	12–15 (4–8)	Jadwin Gymnasium (2,754); Princeton, NJ
Mar 2, 2018; 7:00 pm, ESPN3	at Brown	W 78–63	13–15 (5–8)	Pizzitola Sports Center (516); Providence, RI
Mar 3, 2018; 7:00 pm, ESPN3	at Yale	L 90–94 ^{OT}	13–16 (5–9)	John J. Lee Amphitheater (1,677); New Haven, CT
*Non-conference game. ^{#}Rankings from AP Poll. (#) Tournament seedings in parentheses. All times are in Eastern Time.

== See also ==
- 2017–18 Princeton Tigers women's basketball team
