= 2017–18 Columbia Lions men's basketball team =

American college basketball season

2017–18 Columbia Lions men's basketball
- Conference: Ivy League
- Record: 8–19 (5–9 Ivy)
- Head coach: Jim Engles (2nd season)
- Assistant coaches: Jesse Agel; Jean Bain; Jared Czech
- Home arena: Levien Gymnasium

2017–18 Ivy League men's basketball standings
	Conf.				Overall
Team	W		L	PCT	W		L	PCT
x-Harvard	12	–	2	.857	18	–	14	.563
x-Penn †	12	–	2	.857	24	–	9	.727
Yale	9	–	5	.643	16	–	15	.516
Cornell	6	–	8	.429	12	–	16	.429
Princeton	5	–	9	.357	13	–	16	.448
Columbia	5	–	9	.357	8	–	19	.296
Brown	4	–	10	.286	11	–	16	.407
Dartmouth	3	–	11	.214	7	–	20	.259
† 2018 Ivy League Tournament winner x – Ivy League co-champions

The 2017–18 Columbia Lions men's basketball team represented Columbia University during the 2017–18 NCAA Division I men's basketball season. The Lions, led by second-year head coach Jim Engles, played their home games at Levien Gymnasium in New York City as members of the Ivy League. They finished the season 8–19, 5–9 in Ivy League play to finish in a tie for fifth place and fail to qualify for the Ivy League tournament.

== Previous season ==
The Lions finished the 2016–17 season 11–16, 5–9 in Ivy League play to finish in fifth place. They failed to qualify for the inaugural Ivy League tournament.

== Offseason ==
=== Departures ===
Name	Number	Pos.	Height	Weight	Year	Hometown	Reason for departure
Jeff Coby	1	F	6'8"	223	Senior	Pembroke, FL	Graduated
Andrew Panayiotou	2	F	6'7"	194	Freshman	Victoria, Australia	Left the team for personal reasons
Kendall Jackson	14	G	5'8"	160	Senior	Union City, CA	Graduated
John Sica	24	F	6'7"	195	Sophomore	Delmar, NY	Left the team for personal reasons
Chris McComber	32	F	6'8"	244	Senior	Nepean, ON	Graduated
Luke Petrasek	33	F	6'10"	215	Senior	East Northport, NY	Graduated
Connor Voss	52	C	7'1"	260	Senior	St. Cloud, MN	Graduated

=== 2017 recruiting class ===
College recruiting information
Name	Hometown	School	Height	Weight	Commit date
Jaron Faulds #31 C	Holt, MI	Holt High School	6 ft 10 in (2.08 m)	225 lb (102 kg)	Jul 1, 2016
Jaron Faulds #31 C	Recruit ratings: Scout: Rivals: (80)				
Gabriele Stefanini #109 SG	Bologna, Italy	Bergen Catholic High School	6 ft 1 in (1.85 m)	N/A	Oct 10, 2016
Gabriele Stefanini #109 SG	Recruit ratings: Scout: Rivals: (NR)				
Randall Brumant; PF	Houston, TX	Kent School	6 ft 6 in (1.98 m)	N/A	Oct 26, 2016
Randall Brumant; PF	Recruit ratings: Scout: Rivals: (POST)				
Tai Bibbs; PG	West Chicago, IL	West Chicago Community High School	6 ft 0 in (1.83 m)	N/A	
Tai Bibbs; PG	Recruit ratings: Scout: Rivals: (NR)				
Myles Hanson; SG	Chaska, MN	Chaska High School	6 ft 5 in (1.96 m)	N/A	
Myles Hanson; SG	Recruit ratings: Scout: Rivals: (NR)				
Jake Klores; PG	Chaska, MN	Riverdale Country School	6 ft 0 in (1.83 m)	165 lb (75 kg)	
Jake Klores; PG	Recruit ratings: Scout: Rivals: (NR)				
Overall recruit ranking:
Note: In many cases, Scout, Rivals, 247Sports, On3, and ESPN may conflict in their listings of height and weight.; In these cases, the average was taken. ESPN grades are on a 100-point scale.; Sources: "2017 Team Ranking". Rivals.

== Roster ==
2017–18 Columbia Lions men's basketball team
Players
Coaches

Pos.	#	Name	Height	Weight	Year	Previous school	Hometown
G	0	Kyle Castlin	6 ft 4 in (1.93 m)	190 lb (86 kg)	Sr	Hillsgrove	Marietta, GA
G	1	Luke Bolster	6 ft 0 in (1.83 m)	170 lb (77 kg)	Fr	Trinity School	New York, NY
F	3	Patrick Tape	6 ft 10 in (2.08 m)	220 lb (100 kg)	So	Queen's Grant	Matthews, NC
G/F	4	Rodney Hunter	6 ft 5 in (1.96 m)	200 lb (91 kg)	Jr	Mariner	Cape Coral, FL
G	5	C. J. Davis	6 ft 2 in (1.88 m)	205 lb (93 kg)	Jr	Peddie School/Archbishop Molloy	Far Rockaway, NY
G	10	Quinton Adlesh	6 ft 0 in (1.83 m)	195 lb (88 kg)	Jr	Mission College Prep	Arroyo Grande, CA
F	11	Lukas Meisner	6 ft 8 in (2.03 m)	223 lb (101 kg)	Jr	IGS Franzsches Feld	Braunschweig, Germany
G	12	Mike Smith	5 ft 11 in (1.8 m)	180 lb (82 kg)	So	Fenwick	Burr Ridge, IL
F	13	Randy Brumant	6 ft 7 in (2.01 m)	200 lb (91 kg)	Fr	St. Thomas/Kent School (CT)	Houston, TX
G	15	Gabe Stefanini	6 ft 3 in (1.91 m)	198 lb (90 kg)	Fr	Bergen Catholic (NJ)	Bologna, Italy
G	20	Jake Killingsworth	6 ft 5 in (1.96 m)	205 lb (93 kg)	So	Junípero Serra	San Carlos, CA
G	21	Peter Barba	6 ft 5 in (1.96 m)	198 lb (90 kg)	Jr	Western Reserve Academy	Chagrin Falls, OH
G	22	Nate Hickman	6 ft 4 in (1.93 m)	180 lb (82 kg)	Sr	Peddie School	Wilmington, DE
G	25	Jake Klores	6 ft 0 in (1.83 m)	165 lb (75 kg)	Fr	Riverdale Country School	New York, NY
G/F	31	Myles Hanson	6 ft 6 in (1.98 m)	215 lb (98 kg)	Fr	Chaska	Chaska, MN
G	33	Tai Bibbs	6 ft 3 in (1.91 m)	170 lb (77 kg)	Fr	West Chicago	Chicago, IL
C	41	Shane Eberle	6 ft 10 in (2.08 m)	265 lb (120 kg)	Jr	Our Lake of Good Counsel	Woodbine, MD
F	44	Jaron Faulds	6 ft 10 in (2.08 m)	220 lb (100 kg)	Fr	Holt	Holt, MI

Head coach

- Jim Engles (Dickinson)

Assistant coach(es)

- Jean Bain (Northeastern)
- Jesse Agel (Vermont)
- Jared Czech (Manhattanville)

Legend

- (C) Team captain
- (S) Suspended
- (I) Ineligible
- (W) Walk-on
- Injured
- Current redshirt

Roster

== Schedule and results ==
Date time, TV	Opponent	Result	Record	Site (attendance) city, state
Non-conference regular season
Nov 10, 2017*; 8:30 pm, FS2	at No. 6 Villanova	L 60–75	0–1	Wells Fargo Center (10,504); Philadelphia, PA
Nov 14, 2017*; 7:00 pm	at Longwood	W 87–77	1–1	Willett Hall (1,522); Farmville, VA
Nov 17, 2017*; 7:00 pm, BTN+	at Penn State	L 65–79	1–2	Bryce Jordan Center (6,529); University Park, PA
Nov 21, 2017*; 7:00 pm	at Army	L 78–88	1–3	Christl Arena (683); West Point, NY
Nov 25, 2017*; 2:00 pm	at Colgate	L 71–77	1–4	Cotterell Court (418); Hamilton, NY
Nov 29, 2017*; 7:00 pm, SNY	at UConn	L 73–77 ^{OT}	1–5	Harry A. Gampel Pavilion (3,808); Storrs, CT
Dec 2, 2017*; 7:00 pm, ESPN3	at Albany	L 82–86	1–6	SEFCU Arena (2,208); Albany, NY
Dec 4, 2017*; 7:00 pm, SNY	Quinnipiac	L 87–89	1–7	Levien Gymnasium (873); New York, NY
Dec 7, 2017*; 7:00 pm, SNY	Stony Brook	L 66–76	1–8	Levien Gymnasium (1,231); New York, NY
Dec 10, 2017*; 2:00 pm, SNY	Navy	L 68–73	1–9	Levien Gymnasium (1,169); New York, NY
Dec 12, 2017*; 7:00 pm, ACCN Extra	at Boston College	L 66–81	1–10	Conte Forum (3,989); Chestnut Hill, MA
Dec 30, 2017*; 2:00 pm, ILN	Maine	W 83–71	2–10	Levien Gymnasium (1,376); New York, NY
Jan 6, 2018*; 2:00 pm, ILN	Sarah Lawrence	W 87–42	3–10	Levien Gymnasium (1,134); New York, NY
Ivy League regular season
Jan 12, 2018; 8:00 pm, NBCSP	at Princeton	L 56–71	3–11 (0–1)	Jadwin Gymnasium (1,779); Princeton, NJ
Jan 13, 2018; 7:00 pm, ILN	at Penn	L 71–77	3–12 (0–2)	Palestra (2,084); Philadelphia, PA
Jan 20, 2018; 7:00 pm, SNY	Cornell	W 88–62	4–12 (1–2)	Levien Gymnasium (2,302); New York, NY
Jan 27, 2018; 4:00 pm, ILN	at Cornell	L 81–82	4–13 (1–3)	Newman Arena (3,279); Ithaca, NY
Feb 2, 2018; 7:00 pm, SNY	Harvard	W 83–76	5–13 (2–3)	Levien Gymnasium (2,010); New York, NY
Feb 3, 2018; 7:00 pm, SNY	Dartmouth	W 77–74	6–13 (3–3)	Levien Gymnasium (1,781); New York, NY
Feb 9, 2018; 7:00 pm, SNY	at Yale	L 84–88	6–14 (3–4)	John J. Lee Amphitheater (1,084); New Haven, CT
Feb 10, 2018; 6:00 pm, myRITV	at Brown	L 88–91 ^{OT}	6–15 (3–5)	Pizzitola Sports Center (1,038); Providence, RI
Feb 16, 2018; 7:00 pm, SNY	Penn	L 62–74	6–16 (3–6)	Levien Gymnasium (2,008); New York, NY
Feb 17, 2018; 7:00 pm, SNY	Princeton	W 85–60	7–16 (4–6)	Levien Gymnasium (1,831); New York, NY
Feb 23, 2018; 7:00 pm, SNY	Brown	W 89–82	8–16 (5–6)	Levien Gymnasium (1,611); New York, NY
Feb 24, 2018; 8:30 pm, SNY	Yale	L 73–83	8–17 (5–7)	Levien Gymnasium (1,722); New York, NY
Mar 2, 2018; 7:00 pm, ESPN3	at Dartmouth	L 78–80	8–18 (5–8)	Leede Arena (577); Hanover, NH
Mar 3, 2018; 7:00 pm, ILN	at Harvard	L 74–93	8–19 (5–9)	Lavietes Pavilion (1,636); Boston, MA
*Non-conference game. ^{#}Rankings from AP Poll. (#) Tournament seedings in parentheses. All times are in Eastern Time.

== See also ==
- 2017–18 Columbia Lions women's basketball team
