= 2017–18 Ivy League men's basketball season =

- League: NCAA Division I
- Sport: Basketball
- Duration: January 6 – March 11, 2018
- Teams: 8
- TV partner: Ivy League Digital Network

Regular season
- Champions: Harvard and Penn
- Season MVP: Seth Towns, Harvard men's basketball team

2018 Ivy League men's basketball tournament
- Champions: Penn
- Runners-up: Harvard

Basketball seasons
- ← 2016–17 2018–19 →

2017–18 Ivy League men's basketball standings
	Conf.				Overall
Team	W		L	PCT	W		L	PCT
x-Harvard	12	–	2	.857	18	–	14	.563
x-Penn †	12	–	2	.857	24	–	9	.727
Yale	9	–	5	.643	16	–	15	.516
Cornell	6	–	8	.429	12	–	16	.429
Princeton	5	–	9	.357	13	–	16	.448
Columbia	5	–	9	.357	8	–	19	.296
Brown	4	–	10	.286	11	–	16	.407
Dartmouth	3	–	11	.214	7	–	20	.259
† 2018 Ivy League Tournament winner x – Ivy League co-champions

The 2017–18 Ivy League men's basketball season marked the continuation of the annual tradition of competitive basketball among Ivy League members. The tradition began when the league was formed during the 1956–57 season and its history extends to the predecessor Eastern Intercollegiate Basketball League, which was formed in 1902.

Harvard and Pennsylvania co-shared the league title after finishing the regular season 12–2 within the Ivy League. Pennsylvania earned the league's bid to the 2018 NCAA Men's Division I Basketball Tournament after defeating Yale in the semifinals and Harvard in the finals of the inaugural conference tournament.

Seth Towns of Harvard was named Ivy League Men's Basketball Player of the Year.

== All-Ivy Teams ==
First Team All-Ivy
	School	Class	Position
A.J. Brodeur*	Penn	Sophomore	Forward
Seth Towns*	Harvard	Sophomore	Guard
Chris Lewis*	Harvard	Sophomore	Forward
Matt Morgan*	Cornell	Junior	Guard
Miye Oni*	Yale	Sophomore	Guard

*Unanimous

Second Team All-Ivy
	School	Class	Position
Stone Gettings	Cornell	Junior	Forward
Mike Smith	Columbia	Sophomore	Guard
Devin Cannady	Princeton	Junior	Guard
Desmond Cambridge	Brown	Freshman	Guard
Trey Phills	Yale	Junior	Guard
Myles Stephens	Princeton	Junior	Guard
Ryan Betley	Penn	Sophomore	Guard

== NCAA tournament ==
Seed	Region	School	First Four	Round of 64	Round of 32	Sweet 16	Elite Eight	Final Four	Championship
13	West	Penn	n/a	Eliminated by Kansas, 76–60					
		W–L (%):	0–0 –	0–1 .000	0–0 –	0–0 –	0–0 –	0–0 –	0–0 –Total:0-1 .000
