= 2017–18 Vermont Catamounts men's basketball team =

American college basketball season

2017–18 Vermont Catamounts men's basketball

America East regular season champions The Islands of the Bahamas Showcase champions

NIT, first round
- Conference: America East Conference
- Record: 27–8 (15–1 America East)
- Head coach: John Becker (7th season)
- Assistant coaches: Kyle Cieplicki; Ryan Schneider; Hamlet Tibbs
- Home arena: Patrick Gym

2017–18 America East Conference men's basketball standings
	Conf.				Overall
Team	W		L	PCT	W		L	PCT
Vermont	15	–	1	.938	27	–	8	.771
UMBC †	12	–	4	.750	25	–	11	.694
Hartford	11	–	5	.688	19	–	14	.576
Albany	10	–	6	.625	22	–	10	.688
Stony Brook	7	–	9	.438	13	–	19	.406
New Hampshire	6	–	10	.375	10	–	21	.323
UMass Lowell	6	–	10	.375	12	–	18	.400
Maine	3	–	13	.188	6	–	26	.188
Binghamton	2	–	14	.125	11	–	20	.355
† 2018 America East tournament winner

The 2017–18 Vermont Catamounts men's basketball team represented the University of Vermont during the 2017–18 NCAA Division I men's basketball season. The Catamounts, led by seventh-year head coach John Becker, played their home games at Patrick Gym in Burlington, Vermont as members of the America East Conference. They finished the season 27–8, 15–1 in America East play to win the America East regular season championship. The Catamounts defeated Maine and Stony Brook to advance to the championship game of the America East tournament where they lost to UMBC. As a regular season conference champion who failed to win their conference tournament, the Catamounts received an automatic bid to the National Invitation Tournament where they lost to Middle Tennessee in the first round.

== Previous season ==
The Catamounts finished the 2016–17 season 29–6, 16–0 in America East play to win the America East regular season championship. In the America East tournament, they defeated Maine, New Hampshire, and Albany to win the tournament championship. As a result, they received the conference's automatic bid to the NCAA tournament. As the No. 13 seed in the Midwest region, they lost to No. 4 seed Purdue in the first round.

== Offseason ==
=== Departures ===
Name	Number	Pos.	Height	Weight	Year	Hometown	Reason for departure
Josh Hearlihy	1	G/F	6'8"	213	RS Junior	Los Angeles, CA	Graduate transferred to Seattle
Darren Payen	12	F	6'8"	217	RS Senior	Milford, CT	Graduated
Kian Dalyrimple	15	G	6'4"	177	Freshman	Dix Hills, NY	Transferred to New Haven
Dre Wills	24	G	6'1"	185	Senior	Indianapolis, IN	Graduated
Kurt Steidl	34	G/F	6'6"	181	Senior	Ridgefield, CT	Graduated

=== 2017 incoming recruits ===
College recruiting information
Name	Hometown	School	Height	Weight	Commit date
Bailey Patella #87 SF	Lenox, MA	Vermont Academy	6 ft 5 in (1.96 m)	185 lb (84 kg)	Sep 7, 2015
Bailey Patella #87 SF	Recruit ratings: Scout: Rivals: (64)				
Stefan Smith; PG	Unionville, ON	Bill Crothers Secondary School	6 ft 1 in (1.85 m)	170 lb (77 kg)	Nov 12, 2016
Stefan Smith; PG	Recruit ratings: Scout: Rivals: (NR)				
Skyler Nash; SG	Chicago, IL	Gould Academy	6 ft 5 in (1.96 m)	215 lb (98 kg)	
Skyler Nash; SG	Recruit ratings: Scout: Rivals: (POST)				
Ra Kpedi; PF	Indianapolis, IN	Lawrence North	6 ft 9 in (2.06 m)	225 lb (102 kg)	
Ra Kpedi; PF	Recruit ratings: Scout: Rivals: (NR)				
Overall recruit ranking:
Note: In many cases, Scout, Rivals, 247Sports, On3, and ESPN may conflict in their listings of height and weight.; In these cases, the average was taken. ESPN grades are on a 100-point scale.; Sources: "2017 Team Ranking". Rivals.

== Preseason ==
In a poll by the conference’s nine head coaches (who were not allowed to pick their own team) at the America East media day, the Catamounts were picked to win the America East. Senior Trae Bell-Haynes and sophomore Anthony Lamb were named to the preseason All-America East team.

== Roster ==
2017–18 Vermont Catamounts men's basketball team
Players
Coaches

Pos.	#	Name	Height	Weight	Year	Previous school	Hometown
G	0	Stef Smith	6 ft 1 in (1.85 m)	170 lb (77 kg)	Fr	Bill Crothers	Ajax, ON
G	1	Skyler Nash (redshirt)	6 ft 6 in (1.98 m)	215 lb (98 kg)	Fr	Gould Academy	Chicago, IL
G	2	Trae Bell-Haynes	6 ft 2 in (1.88 m)	175 lb (79 kg)	Sr	Bill Crothers Secondary	Toronto, ON
F	3	Anthony Lamb	6 ft 6 in (1.98 m)	227 lb (103 kg)	So	Greece Athena	Rochester, NY
G	4	David Urso (W)	6 ft 2 in (1.88 m)	200 lb (91 kg)	Sr	Central Catholic	Pittsburgh, PA
F	5	Sam Dingba	6 ft 5 in (1.96 m)	205 lb (93 kg)	RS Jr	Salisbury School; Qunnipiac	Yaoundé, Cameroon
F	12	Bailey Patella	6 ft 5 in (1.96 m)	185 lb (84 kg)	Fr	Vermont Academy	Lenox, MA
G	14	Cam Ward	6 ft 2 in (1.88 m)	170 lb (77 kg)	Sr	Marshall	Marshall, WI
G	15	Ra Kpedi	6 ft 9 in (2.06 m)	220 lb (100 kg)	Fr	Lawrence North	Indianapolis, IN
G	20	Ernie Duncan	6 ft 3 in (1.91 m)	190 lb (86 kg)	RS Jr	Harrison	Evansville, IN
G	21	Everett Duncan	6 ft 6 in (1.98 m)	190 lb (86 kg)	RS So	Harrison	Evansville, IN
G	24	Ben Shungu (W)	6 ft 2 in (1.88 m)	200 lb (91 kg)	RS Fr	Rice Memorial	Burlington, VT
F	25	Drew Urquhart	6 ft 8 in (2.03 m)	219 lb (99 kg)	Sr	Eastside Catholic	Vancouver, BC
F	32	Josh Speidel	6 ft 7 in (2.01 m)	210 lb (95 kg)	RS Fr	Columbus North	Columbus, IN
F	35	Payton Henson	6 ft 8 in (2.03 m)	215 lb (98 kg)	RS Sr	Siloam Springs; Tulane	Siloam Springs, AR
F	44	Nate Rohrer (W)	6 ft 7 in (2.01 m)	215 lb (98 kg)	RS Sr	Leland	Underhill, VT

Head coach

- John Becker (Catholic)

Assistant coach(es)

- Kyle Cieplicki (Vermont)
- Ryan Schneider (Marist)
- Hamlet Tibbs (West Virginia)

Legend

- (C) Team captain
- (S) Suspended
- (I) Ineligible
- (W) Walk-on
- Injured
- Current redshirt

Roster

== Schedule and results ==
Date time, TV	Rank^{#}	Opponent^{#}	Result	Record	High points	High rebounds	High assists	Site (attendance) city, state
Exhibition
Oct 27, 2017*; 7:00 pm		Boston University; Exhibition for hurricane relief	W 87–66		22 – Er. Duncan	6 – Lamb	2 – Tied	Patrick Gym (1,446); Burlington, VT
Oct 29, 2017*; 2:00 pm, AE.TV		Concordia (QC)	W 92–64		17 – Tied	6 – Tied	4 – Tied	Patrick Gym (1,646); Burlington, VT
Nov 4, 2017*; 7:00 pm, AE.TV		Saint Michael's	W 102–53		17 – Henson	7 – Henson	5 – Shungu	Patrick Gym (2,661); Burlington, VT
Regular season
Nov 12, 2017*; 3:30 pm, ESPN		at No. 5 Kentucky	L 69–73	0–1	16 – Bell-Haynes	7 – Lamb	5 – Bell-Haynes	Rupp Arena (20,174); Lexington, KY
Nov 17, 2017*; 11:00 am		vs. Bradley; The Islands of the Bahamas Showcase quarterfinals	W 65–64	1–1	14 – Tied	9 – Henson	5 – Bell-Haynes	Kendal Isaacs National Gymnasium (334); Nassau, BAH
Nov 18, 2017*; 5:00 pm		vs. Coastal Carolina; The Islands of the Bahamas Showcase semifinals	W 80–67	2–1	19 – Er. Duncan	6 – Urquhart	6 – Er. Duncan	Kendal Isaacs National Gymnasium (452); Nassau, BAH
Nov 19, 2017*; 8:00 pm		vs. Northern Kentucky; The Islands of the Bahamas Showcase championship game	W 66–64	3–1	26 – Lamb	14 – Lamb	3 – Bell-Haynes	Kendal Isaacs National Gymnasium (477); Nassau, BAH
Nov 22, 2017*; 7:00 pm, ESPN3		Maine–Fort Kent; The Islands of the Bahamas Showcase campus game	W 90–54	4–1	13 – Dingba	7 – Tied	4 – Bell-Haynes	Patrick Gym (2,363); Burlington, VT
Nov 25, 2017*; 2:00 pm, ESPN3		at Yale	W 79–73	5–1	22 – Lamb	7 – Lamb	10 – Bell-Haynes	Payne Whitney Gymnasium (1,644); New Haven, CT
Nov 29, 2017*; 7:00 pm, NBCSWA+		at Richmond	W 71–65	6–1	21 – Er. Duncan	8 – Henson	6 – Bell-Haynes	Robins Center (4,615); Richmond, VA
Dec 2, 2017*; 7:00 pm		at Bucknell	L 77–81	6–2	20 – Lamb	5 – Tied	2 – Bell-Haynes	Sojka Pavilion (3,044); Lewisburg, PA
Dec 5, 2017*; 7:00 pm, FS1		at Marquette	L 81–91	6–3	20 – Smith	6 – Tied	8 – Bell-Haynes	Bradley Center (12,055); Milwaukee, WI
Dec 9, 2017*; 4:00 pm		at Northeastern	L 67–71	6–4	32 – Lamb	9 – Henson	2 – Tied	Matthews Arena (1,600); Boston, MA
Dec 11, 2017*; 7:00 pm, ESPN3		Siena	W 81–57	7–4	13 – Urquhart	7 – Bell-Haynes	5 – Tied	Patrick Gym (3,266); Burlington, VT
Dec 16, 2017*; 4:00 pm		vs. St. Bonaventure; Roc City Hoops Classic	L 79–81	7–5	27 – Lamb	8 – Lamb	5 – Er. Duncan	Blue Cross Arena (5,828); Rochester, NY
Dec 21, 2017*; 7:00 pm, ESPN3		Quinnipiac	W 80–73	8–5	20 – Lamb	8 – Bell-Haynes	5 – Bell-Haynes	Patrick Gym (2,349); Burlington, VT
Jan 2, 2018*; 4:00 pm, NESN+		at Harvard	W 62–56	9–5	17 – Henson	5 – Tied	4 – Ward	Lavietes Pavilion (1,215); Cambridge, MA
Jan 4, 2018; 7:00 pm, ESPN3		at UMass Lowell	W 88–77	10–5 (1–0)	32 – Er. Duncan	12 – Urquhart	5 – Bell-Haynes	Costello Athletic Center (289); Lowell, MA
Jan 6, 2018; 7:00 pm, ESPN3		UMBC	W 71–56	11–5 (2–0)	16 – Henson	14 – Henson	4 – Urquhart	Patrick Gym (2,734); Burlington, VT
Jan 10, 2018*; 7:00 pm		at Dartmouth	W 91–78	12–5	27 – Bell-Haynes	4 – Tied	4 – Ward	Leede Arena (1,263); Hanover, NH
Jan 13, 2018; 2:00 pm, ESPN3		Stony Brook	W 73–62	13–5 (3–0)	20 – Bell-Haynes	6 – Bell-Haynes	2 – Tied	Patrick Gym (3,266); Burlington, VT
Jan 15, 2018; 7:00 pm, ESPN3		Maine	W 83–62	14–5 (4–0)	21 – Urquhart	5 – Tied	6 – Er. Duncan	Patrick Gym (2,405); Burlington, VT
Jan 18, 2018; 7:00 pm, ESPN3		at New Hampshire	W 67–56	15–5 (5–0)	20 – Bell-Haynes	9 – Urquhart	3 – Urquhart	Lundholm Gym (560); Durham, NH
Jan 21, 2018; 7:00 pm, ESPN3		at Hartford	W 76–53	16–5 (6–0)	18 – Henson	6 – Bell-Haynes	6 – Er. Duncan	Chase Arena (1,784); Hartford, CT
Jan 24, 2018; 7:00 pm, ESPN3		Albany	W 61–50	17–5 (7–0)	21 – Bell-Haynes	11 – Ev. Duncan	4 – Er. Duncan	Patrick Gym (3,266); Burlington, VT
Jan 31, 2018; 7:00 pm, ESPN3		at Binghamton	W 68–54	18–5 (8–0)	21 – Bell-Haynes	9 – Ev. Duncan	6 – Bell-Haynes	Binghamton University Events Center (4,445); Vestal, NY
Feb 3, 2018; 7:00 pm, ESPN3		at UMBC	W 81–53	19–5 (9–0)	18 – Urquhart	8 – Tied	4 – Tied	UMBC Event Center (4,753); Catonsville, MD
Feb 8, 2018; 7:00 pm, ESPNU		at Albany	W 72–67	20–5 (10–0)	20 – Bell-Haynes	8 – Urquhart	5 – Tied	SEFCU Arena (3,602); Albany, NY
Feb 11, 2018; 2:00 pm, ESPN3		UMass Lowell	W 81–69	21–5 (11–0)	27 – Bell-Haynes	6 – Tied	4 – Bell-Haynes	Patrick Gym (2,910); Burlington, VT
Feb 15, 2018; 7:00 pm, ESPN3		New Hampshire	W 71–58	22–5 (12–0)	14 – Ward	8 – Urquhart	2 – Tied	Patrick Gym (2,633); Burlington, VT
Feb 18, 2018; 2:00 pm, ESPN3		Hartford	L 68–69	22–6 (12–1)	15 – Urquhart	10 – Urquhart	5 – Urquhart	Patrick Gym (3,168); Burlington, VT
Feb 21, 2018; 7:00 pm, ESPN3		Binghamton	W 75–54	23–6 (13–1)	18 – Tied	10 – Urquhart	7 – Henson	Patrick Gym (2,854); Burlington, VT
Feb 24, 2018; 7:00 pm, ESPN3		at Stony Brook	W 69–60	24–6 (14–1)	19 – Bell-Haynes	9 – Henson	6 – Bell-Haynes	Island Federal Credit Union Arena (3,528); Stony Brook, NY
Feb 27, 2018; 7:00 pm, ESPN3		at Maine	W 74–62	25–6 (15–1)	16 – Bell-Haynes	9 – Henson	4 – Urquhart	Cross Insurance Center (907); Bangor, ME
America East tournament
Mar 3, 2018; 7:00 pm, ESPN3	(1)	(8) Maine; Quarterfinals	W 75–60	26–6	21 – Tied	12 – Urquhart	4 – Tied	Patrick Gym (3,266); Burlington, VT
Mar 5, 2018; 7:00 pm, ESPN3	(1)	(5) Stony Brook; Semifinals	W 70–51	27–6	19 – Urquhart	8 – Tied	6 – Bell-Haynes	Patrick Gym (3,266); Burlington, VT
Mar 10, 2018; 11:00 am, ESPN2	(1)	(2) UMBC; Championship game	L 62–65	27–7	18 – Bell-Haynes	10 – Urquhart	5 – Bell-Haynes	Patrick Gym (3,266); Burlington, VT
NIT
Mar 13, 2018*; 8:00 pm, ESPNU	(6)	at (3) Middle Tennessee; First Round – Baylor Bracket	L 64–91	27–8	18 – Lamb	5 – Tied	7 – Bell-Haynes	Murphy Center (5,010); Murfreesboro, TN
*Non-conference game. ^{#}Rankings from AP Poll. (#) Tournament seedings in parentheses. All times are in Eastern Time.
