= 2017–18 Harvard Crimson men's basketball team =

American college basketball season

2017–18 Harvard Crimson men's basketball

Ivy League Regular Season Co-Champions

NIT, First Round
- Conference: Ivy League
- Record: 18–14 (12–2 Ivy)
- Head coach: Tommy Amaker (11th season)
- Assistant coaches: Brian DeStefano; Donny Guerinoni; Michael Sotsky
- Home arena: Lavietes Pavilion

2017–18 Ivy League men's basketball standings
	Conf.				Overall
Team	W		L	PCT	W		L	PCT
x-Harvard	12	–	2	.857	18	–	14	.563
x-Penn †	12	–	2	.857	24	–	9	.727
Yale	9	–	5	.643	16	–	15	.516
Cornell	6	–	8	.429	12	–	16	.429
Princeton	5	–	9	.357	13	–	16	.448
Columbia	5	–	9	.357	8	–	19	.296
Brown	4	–	10	.286	11	–	16	.407
Dartmouth	3	–	11	.214	7	–	20	.259
† 2018 Ivy League Tournament winner x – Ivy League co-champions

The 2017–18 Harvard Crimson men's basketball team represented Harvard University during the 2017–18 NCAA Division I men's basketball season. The Crimson, led by 11th-year head coach Tommy Amaker, played their home games at Lavietes Pavilion in Boston, Massachusetts as members of the Ivy League. They finished the season 18–14, 12–2 in Ivy League play to share the Ivy League regular season championship with Penn. As the No. 1 seed in the Ivy League tournament, they defeated Cornell in the semifinals before losing to Penn in the championship game. As a regular season league champion, and No. 1 seed in their league tournament, who failed to win their league tournament, they received an automatic bid to the National Invitation Tournament where they lost in the first round to Marquette.

== Previous season ==
The Crimson finished the 2016–17 season 18–10, 10–4 in Ivy League play to finish in second place. They lost in the semifinals of the inaugural Ivy League tournament to Yale.

== Offseason ==
=== Departures ===
Name	Number	Pos.	Height	Weight	Year	Hometown	Reason for departure
Siyani Chambers	1	G	6'0"	170	Senior	Golden Valley, MN	Graduated
Zena Edosomwan	4	F	6'9"	245	Senior	Los Angeles, CA	Graduated
Matt Franschilla	12	G	5'10"	165	Senior	Dallas, TX	Graduated
Corbin Miller	15	G	6'1"	180	Senior	Sandy, UT	Graduated

=== 2017 recruiting class ===
College recruiting information
Name	Hometown	School	Height	Weight	Commit date
Mario Haskett #67 SG	Chesterfield, VA	Lloyd C. Bird High School	6 ft 3 in (1.91 m)	175 lb (79 kg)	Jun 16, 2016
Mario Haskett #67 SG	Recruit ratings: Scout: Rivals: (75)				
Reed Farley #87 SF	La Jolla, CA	La Jolla High School	6 ft 3 in (1.91 m)	175 lb (79 kg)	Oct 14, 2016
Reed Farley #87 SF	Recruit ratings: Scout: Rivals: (64)				
Danilo Djuricic; PF	Toronto, ON	St. Michael's College School	6 ft 8 in (2.03 m)	205 lb (93 kg)	Sep 23, 2016
Danilo Djuricic; PF	Recruit ratings: Scout: Rivals: (NR)				
Overall recruit ranking:
Note: In many cases, Scout, Rivals, 247Sports, On3, and ESPN may conflict in their listings of height and weight.; In these cases, the average was taken. ESPN grades are on a 100-point scale.; Sources: "Harvard 2017 Basketball Commitments". Rivals.; "2017 Harvard Basketball Commits". Scout.; "ESPN Recruiting Nation Basketball". ESPN.; "Scout.com Team Recruiting Rankings". Scout.; "2017 Team Ranking". Rivals.

=== 2018 recruiting class ===
College recruiting information (2018)
Name	Hometown	School	Height	Weight	Commit date
Spencer Freedman #27 PG	Santa Monica, CA	Mater Dei High School	6 ft 1 in (1.85 m)	160 lb (73 kg)	Jun 9, 2017
Spencer Freedman #27 PG	Recruit ratings: Scout: Rivals: (82)				
Noah Kirkwood; SF	Ottawa, ON	Northfield-Mt. Hermon School	6 ft 6 in (1.98 m)	222 lb (101 kg)	
Noah Kirkwood; SF	Recruit ratings: Scout: Rivals: (80)				
Overall recruit ranking:
Note: In many cases, Scout, Rivals, 247Sports, On3, and ESPN may conflict in their listings of height and weight.; In these cases, the average was taken. ESPN grades are on a 100-point scale.; Sources: "Harvard 2018 Basketball Commitments". Rivals.; "2018 Harvard Basketball Commits". Scout.; "ESPN Recruiting Nation Basketball". ESPN.; "Scout.com Team Recruiting Rankings". Scout.; "2018 Team Ranking". Rivals.

== Roster ==
2017–18 Harvard Crimson men's basketball team
Players
Coaches

Pos.	#	Name	Height	Weight	Year	Previous school	Hometown
F	0	Chris Lewis	6 ft 9 in (2.06 m)	235 lb (107 kg)	So	Milton High School	Alpharetta, Georgia
G	2	James McLean	6 ft 0 in (1.83 m)	185 lb (84 kg)	Jr	Sacred Heart Preparatory	Atherton, California
G	3	Tommy McCarthy	6 ft 0 in (1.83 m)	175 lb (79 kg)	Jr	La Costa Canyon High School	Rancho Santa Fe, California
G	5	Rio Haskett	6 ft 3 in (1.91 m)	195 lb (88 kg)	Fr	L. C. Bird High School	Richmond, Virginia
G	11	Bryce Aiken	6 ft 0 in (1.83 m)	175 lb (79 kg)	So	The Patrick School	Randolph, New Jersey
G	13	Andre Chatfield	6 ft 4 in (1.93 m)	185 lb (84 kg)	Sr	Norcross High School	Lilburn, Georgia
F	14	Balsa Dragovic	6 ft 10 in (2.08 m)	225 lb (102 kg)	Jr	Cantwell-Sacred Heart of Mary High School	Zemun, Serbia
G	20	Justin Bassey	6 ft 5 in (1.96 m)	215 lb (98 kg)	Fr	Colorado Academy	Denver, Colorado
G	21	Zach Yoshor	6 ft 6 in (1.98 m)	205 lb (93 kg)	Sr	Robert M. Beren Academy	Houston, Texas
G	22	Christian Juzang	6 ft 2 in (1.88 m)	175 lb (79 kg)	So	Viewpoint School	Tarzana, California
F	23	Weisner Perez	6 ft 6 in (1.98 m)	220 lb (100 kg)	Jr	J. Sterling Morton High School West	Berwyn, Illinois
F	24	Chris Egi (C)	6 ft 9 in (2.06 m)	225 lb (102 kg)	Sr	Montverde Academy	Markham, Ontario
G	25	Corey Johnson	6 ft 5 in (1.96 m)	200 lb (91 kg)	Jr	Vermont Academy	Ottawa, Ontario
F	30	Danilo Djuricic	6 ft 8 in (2.03 m)	210 lb (95 kg)	Fr	St. Michael's College School	Brampton, Ontario
F	31	Seth Towns	6 ft 7 in (2.01 m)	215 lb (98 kg)	So	Northland High School	Columbus, Ohio
G	32	Robbie Feinberg	6 ft 3 in (1.91 m)	200 lb (91 kg)	Jr	Sierra Canyon School	Hidden Hills, California
G	33	Reed Farley	6 ft 4 in (1.93 m)	190 lb (86 kg)	Fr	La Jolla High School	La Jolla, California
F	35	Robert Baker	6 ft 11 in (2.11 m)	205 lb (93 kg)	So	The Walker School	Woodstock, Georgia
F	44	Henry Welsh	6 ft 10 in (2.08 m)	250 lb (113 kg)	So	Loyola High School	Redondo Beach, California

Head coach

- Tommy Amaker (Duke)

Assistant coach(es)

- Brian DeStefano (Duke)
- Donny Guerinoni (Nevada)
- Michael Sotsky (Harvard)

Legend

- (C) Team captain
- (S) Suspended
- (I) Ineligible
- (W) Walk-on
- Injured
- Current redshirt

Roster

== Schedule and results ==
The team earned a share of the 2017–18 Ivy League men's basketball season regular season title.

Date time, TV	Rank^{#}	Opponent^{#}	Result	Record	High points	High rebounds	High assists	Site (attendance) city, state
Regular season
Nov 10, 2017*; 7:00 pm, NESN+		MIT	W 73–64	1–0	20 – Towns	10 – Lewis	4 – Bassey	Lavietes Pavilion (1,472); Boston, MA
Nov 12, 2017*; 2:00 pm, NESN+		Massachusetts	W 70–67 ^{OT}	2–0	30 – Aiken	8 – Aiken	4 – Tied	Lavietes Pavilion (1,636); Boston, MA
Nov 16, 2017*; 7:00 pm		at Holy Cross	L 69–73	2–1	24 – Towns	10 – Towns	6 – Aiken	Hart Center (2,242); Worcester, MA
Nov 18, 2017*; 1:00 pm		at Manhattan	L 69–73	2–2	17 – Towns	5 – Tied	4 – Aiken	Draddy Gymnasium (1,250); Riverdale, NY
Nov 23, 2017*; 4:00 pm, ESPNews		vs. No. 21 Saint Mary's; Wooden Legacy quarterfinals	L 71–89	2–3	22 – Aiken	4 – Towns	3 – Tied	Titan Gym (2,131); Fullerton, CA
Nov 24, 2017*; 5:00 pm, ESPNews		vs. Saint Joseph's; Wooden Legacy consolation round	W 77–71	3–3	21 – Tied	11 – Baker	8 – Aiken	Titan Gym (2,513); Fullerton, CA
Nov 26, 2017*; 9:30 pm, ESPN3		vs. Cal State Fullerton; Wooden Legacy 5th place game	L 61–70	3–4	16 – Aiken	8 – Baker	3 – Tied	Honda Center (1,733); Anaheim, CA
Nov 30, 2017*; 7:00 pm		at Northeastern	L 61–77	3–5	26 – Aiken	10 – Bassey	2 – Tied	Matthews Arena (1,376); Boston, MA
Dec 2, 2017*; 3:30 pm, ESPN		at No. 7 Kentucky	L 70–79	3–6	25 – Towns	7 – Djuricic	3 – Tied	Rupp Arena (22,922); Lexington, KY
Dec 6, 2017*; 7:00 pm		at Fordham	W 47–45	4–6	15 – Aiken	11 – Tied	3 – Tied	Rose Hill Gymnasium (1,012); Bronx, NY
Dec 21, 2017*; 7:00 pm, NESN+		Boston University	W 74–63	5–6	12 – Tied	7 – Perez	4 – Johnson	Lavietes Pavilion (1,175); Boston, MA
Dec 23, 2017*; 12:00 pm, Stadium		at George Washington	L 48–58	5–7	12 – Towns	7 – Tied	3 – Johnson	Charles E. Smith Center (2,421); Washington, D.C.
Dec 30, 2017*; 2:00 pm, BTN		at Minnesota	L 55–65	5–8	12 – Johnson	10 – Bassey	6 – Juzang	Williams Arena (14,625); Minneapolis, MN
Jan 2, 2018*; 7:00 pm, NESN+		Vermont	L 56–62	5–9	14 – Lewis	5 – Towns	3 – Tied	Lavietes Pavilion (1,215); Boston, MA
Jan 6, 2018; 2:00 pm, ESPN3		Dartmouth	W 61–51	6–9 (1–0)	16 – Towns	6 – Tied	4 – Juzang	Lavietes Pavilion (1,459); Boston, MA
Jan 10, 2018*; 7:00 pm, ESPN3		at Wofford	L 62–63	6–10	20 – Towns	7 – Lewis	4 – Towns	Jerry Richardson Indoor Stadium (2,259); Spartanburg, SC
Jan 20, 2018; 7:00 pm, ELVN		at Dartmouth	W 62–57	7–10 (2–0)	26 – Towns	10 – Bassey	3 – Bassey	Leede Arena (1,630); Hanover, NH
Jan 26, 2018; 7:00 pm		at Yale	W 54-52	8–10 (3–0)	16 – Lewis	11 – Lewis	5 – Towns	John J. Lee Amphitheater (2,532); New Haven, CT
Jan 27, 2018; 6:00 pm, NESN+		at Brown	W 86–77	9–10 (4–0)	30 – Towns	6 – Lewis	2 – Tied	Pizzitola Sports Center (2,149); Providence, RI
Feb 2, 2018; 7:00 pm		at Columbia	L 76–83	9–11 (4–1)	31 – Towns	6 – Bassey	5 – Bassey	Levien Gymnasium (2,010); New York, NY
Feb 3, 2018; 6:00 pm, ELVN		at Cornell	W 76–73	10–11 (5–1)	17 – Lewis	7 – Towns	6 – Towns	Newman Arena (1,188); Ithaca, NY
Feb 9, 2018; 7:00 pm, ESPNU		Princeton	W 66–51	11–11 (6–1)	20 – Juzang	8 – Bassey	4 – Juzang	Lavietes Pavilion (1,636); Boston, MA
Feb 10, 2018; 4:00 pm, NESN		Penn	W 76–67	12–11 (7–1)	25 – Lewis	7 – Bassey	6 – Juzang	Lavietes Pavilion (1,636); Boston, MA
Feb 16, 2018; 7:00 pm, NESN		Brown	W 65–58	13–11 (8–1)	24 – Towns	10 – Lewis	2 – Tied	Lavietes Pavilion (1,486); Boston, MA
Feb 17, 2018; 9:30 pm, ESPNU		Yale	W 64–49	14–11 (9–1)	18 – Lewis	10 – Lewis	8 – Juzang	Lavietes Pavilion (1,636); Boston, MA
Feb 23, 2018; 7:00 pm, ESPNU		at Princeton	W 72–66 ^{OT}	15–11 (10–1)	18 – Bassey	9 – Towns	7 – Juzang	Jadwin Gymnasium (2,739); Princeton, NJ
Feb 24, 2018; 7:00 pm, ESPN3		at Penn	L 71–74	15–12 (10–2)	22 – Towns	9 – Bassey	4 – Bassey	Palestra (6,586); Philadelphia, PA
Mar 2, 2018; 7:00 pm, ESPN3		Cornell	W 98–88 ^{2OT}	16–12 (11–2)	29 – Lewis	11 – Juzang	5 – Tied	Lavietes Pavilion (1,636); Boston, MA
Mar 3, 2018; 7:00 pm		Columbia	W 93–74	17–12 (12–2)	17 – Johnson	10 – Towns	7 – Tied	Lavietes Pavilion (1,636); Boston, MA
Ivy League tournament
Mar 10, 2018; 12:30 pm, ESPNU	(1)	vs. (4) Cornell; Semifinals	W 74–55	18–12	24 – Towns	12 – Towns	4 – Juzang	Palestra; Philadelphia, PA
Mar 11, 2018; 12:00 pm, ESPN2	(1)	at (2) Penn; Championship game	L 65–68	18–13	16 – Lewis	8 – Bassey	3 – Lewis	Palestra (5,564); Philadelphia, PA
NIT
Mar 14, 2018*; 7:00 pm, ESPN2	(7)	at (2) Marquette; First round – Notre Dame Bracket	L 60–67	18–14	19 – Bassey	12 – Bassey	5 – Bassey	Al McGuire Center (3,607); Milwaukee, WI
*Non-conference game. ^{#}Rankings from AP Poll,. (#) Tournament seedings in parentheses. All times are in Eastern Time.
