= 2018–19 Harvard Crimson men's basketball team =

American college basketball season

2018–19 Harvard Crimson men's basketball

Ivy League regular season co-champions

NIT, Second Round
- Conference: Ivy League
- Record: 19–12 (10–4 Ivy)
- Head coach: Tommy Amaker (12th season)
- Assistant coaches: Brian Eskildsen; Donny Guerinoni; Mike Sotsky
- Home arena: Lavietes Pavilion

2018–19 Ivy League men's basketball standings
	Conf.				Overall
Team	W		L	PCT	W		L	PCT
x-Harvard	10	–	4	.714	19	–	12	.613
x-Yale †	10	–	4	.714	22	–	8	.733
Princeton	8	–	6	.571	16	–	12	.571
Penn	7	–	7	.500	19	–	12	.613
Cornell	7	–	7	.500	15	–	16	.484
Brown	7	–	7	.500	20	–	12	.625
Columbia	5	–	9	.357	10	–	18	.357
Dartmouth	2	–	12	.143	11	–	19	.367
† 2019 Ivy League tournament winner x - Ivy League co-champions

The 2018–19 Harvard Crimson men's basketball team represented Harvard University in the 2018–19 NCAA Division I men's basketball season. They played their home games at the Lavietes Pavilion in Boston, Massachusetts and were led by 12th-year head coach Tommy Amaker. They finished the season 19-12, 10-4 to tie for first place. As the No. 1 seed in the Ivy Tournament, they defeated Penn in the semifinals before losing to Yale in the final. They received an automatic bid to the NIT where they defeated Georgetown in the first round before losing in the second round to NC State.

== Previous season ==
The Crimson finished the 2017–18 season 18–14, 12–2 in Ivy League play to share the Ivy League regular season championship with Penn. As the No. 1 seed in the Ivy League tournament, they defeated Cornell in the semifinals before losing to Penn in the championship game. As a regular season league champion, and No. 1 seed in their league tournament, who failed to win their league tournament, they received an automatic bid to the National Invitation Tournament, where they lost in the first round to Marquette.

== Roster ==
2018–19 Harvard Crimson men's basketball team
Players
Coaches

Pos.	#	Name	Height	Weight	Year	Previous school	Hometown
F	0	Chris Lewis	6 ft 9 in (2.06 m)	235 lb (107 kg)	Jr	Milton	Alpharetta, GA
G	2	James McLean	6 ft 0 in (1.83 m)	185 lb (84 kg)	Sr	Sacred Heart Prep	Atherton, CA
G	3	Tommy McCarthy	6 ft 0 in (1.83 m)	175 lb (79 kg)	Sr	La Costa Canyon	Rancho Santa Fe, CA
G	5	Rio Haskett	6 ft 3 in (1.91 m)	195 lb (88 kg)	So	L.C. Bird	Richmond, VA
G	10	Noah Kirkwood	6 ft 7 in (2.01 m)	215 lb (98 kg)	Fr	Northfield Mount Hermon	Ottawa, ON
G	11	Bryce Aiken	6 ft 0 in (1.83 m)	175 lb (79 kg)	Jr	The Patrick School	Randolph, NJ
G	12	Spencer Freedman	6 ft 0 in (1.83 m)	170 lb (77 kg)	Fr	Mater Dei	Pacific Palisades, CA
F	14	Balsa Dragovic	6 ft 10 in (2.08 m)	225 lb (102 kg)	Sr	Cantwell-Sacred Heart of Mary	Zemun, Serbia
G	20	Justin Bassey	6 ft 5 in (1.96 m)	215 lb (98 kg)	Jr	Colorado Academy	Denver, CO
F	21	Mason Forbes	6 ft 8 in (2.03 m)	200 lb (91 kg)	Fr	Folsom	Folsom, CA
G	22	Christian Juzang	6 ft 2 in (1.88 m)	175 lb (79 kg)	Jr	Viewpoint School	Tarzana, CA
F	23	Weisner Perez	6 ft 6 in (1.98 m)	220 lb (100 kg)	Sr	Morton West	Berwyn, IL
F	24	Kale Catchings	6 ft 6 in (1.98 m)	220 lb (100 kg)	Fr	Liberty	O'Fallon, MO
G	25	Corey Johnson	6 ft 5 in (1.96 m)	200 lb (91 kg)	Sr	Vermont Academy	Ottawa, ON
F	30	Danilo Djuricic	6 ft 8 in (2.03 m)	210 lb (95 kg)	So	St. Michael's College School	Brampton, ON
F	31	Seth Towns	6 ft 7 in (2.01 m)	215 lb (98 kg)	Jr	Northland	Columbus, OH
G	32	Robbie Feinberg	6 ft 3 in (1.91 m)	200 lb (91 kg)	Sr	Sierra Canyon	Hidden Hills, CA
G	33	Reed Farley	6 ft 4 in (1.93 m)	190 lb (86 kg)	So	La Jolla	La Jolla, CA
F	35	Robert Baker	6 ft 11 in (2.11 m)	205 lb (93 kg)	Jr	The Walker School	Woodstock, GA
F	44	Henry Welsh	6 ft 10 in (2.08 m)	250 lb (113 kg)	Jr	Loyola	Redondo Beach, CA

Head coach

- Tommy Amaker (Duke)

Assistant coach(es)

- Brian Eskildsen (Tennessee)
- Donny Guerinoni (Nevada)
- Michael Sotsky (Harvard)

Legend

- (C) Team captain
- (S) Suspended
- (I) Ineligible
- (W) Walk-on
- Injured
- Current redshirt

Roster
Last update: December 17, 2018

== Schedule and results ==
Date time, TV	Rank^{#}	Opponent^{#}	Result	Record	Site (attendance) city, state
Regular season
November 6, 2018*; 7:00 pm, ESPN+		MIT	W 78–66	1–0	Lavietes Pavilion (1,311); Boston, MA
November 9, 2018*; 7:00 pm, ESPN+		Northeastern	L 71–81	1–1	Lavietes Pavilion (1,481); Boston, MA
November 13, 2018*; 7:00 pm, NESN		at UMass	W 74–71	2–1	William D. Mullins Memorial Center (2,645); Amherst, mA
November 16, 2018*; 7:00 pm, ESPN+		at Rhode Island	L 74–76	2–2	Ryan Center (2,101); Kingston, RI
November 21, 2018*; 10:00 pm		at San Francisco	L 57–61	2–3	War Memorial Gymnasium (1,719); San Francisco, CA
November 24, 2018*; 9:00 pm		at Saint Mary's	W 74–68	3–3	McKeon Pavilion (3,247); Moraga, CA
November 28, 2018*; 7:00 pm, ESPN+		Holy Cross	W 73–62	4–3	Lavietes Pavilion (1,283); Boston, MA
December 1, 2018*; 3:00 pm		at Siena	L 64–67	4–4	Times Union Center (5,650); Albany, NY
December 8, 2018*; 7:00 pm		at Vermont	L 65–71	4–5	Patrick Gym (2,959); Burlington, VT
December 22, 2018*; 2:00 pm, ESPN+		George Washington	W 75–61	5–5	Lavietes Pavilion (2,050); Boston, MA
December 29, 2018*; 1:30 pm		vs. Mercer	W 71–67	6–5	State Farm Arena (2,504); Atlanta, GA
January 2, 2019*; 7:00 pm, ESPN2		at No. 15 North Carolina	L 57–77	6–6	Dean Smith Center (21,329); Chapel Hill, NC
~~January 6, 2019~~ * ~~2:00 pm~~ , ~~ESPN+~~		~~McGill~~			~~Lavietes Pavilion~~; ~~Boston, MA~~
January 12, 2019; 7:00 pm, ESPN+		at Dartmouth	L 63–81	6–7 (0–1)	Leede Arena (1,452); Hanover, NH
January 21, 2019*; 1:00 pm		at Howard	W 84–71	7–7	Burr Gymnasium (2,523); Washington, D.C.
January 26, 2019; 2:00 pm, NESN		Dartmouth	W 64–59	8–7 (1–1)	Lavietes Pavilion (1,636); Boston, MA
February 1, 2019; 7:00 pm, ESPNU		Yale	W 65–49	9–7 (2–1)	Lavietes Pavilion (1,636); Boston, MA
February 2, 2019; 7:00 pm, ESPN+		Brown	W 68–47	10–7 (3–1)	Lavietes Pavilion (1,636); Boston, MA
February 8, 2019; 7:00 pm, ESPN+		Columbia	W 98–96 ^{3OT}	11–7 (4–1)	Lavietes Pavilion (1,636); Boston, MA
February 9, 2019; 7:00 pm, ESPN+		Cornell	L 61–67	11–8 (4–2)	Lavietes Pavilion (1,528); Boston, MA
February 15, 2019; 7:00 pm, ESPNews		at Princeton	W 78–69	12–8 (5–2)	Jadwin Gymnasium (2,945); Princeton, NJ
February 16, 2019; 7:00 pm, NBCSP		at Penn	W 75–68 ^{OT}	13–8 (6–2)	The Palestra (5,662); Philadelphia, Pennsylvania
February 22, 2019; 7:00 pm, ESPN+		at Brown	L 79–88	13–9 (6–3)	Pizzitola Sports Center (2,208); Providence, RI
February 23, 2019; 6:00 pm, ESPN+		at Yale	W 88–86	14–9 (7–3)	John J. Lee Amphitheater (2,532); New Haven, CT
March 1, 2019; 7:00 pm, ESPN+		Penn	W 59–53	15–9 (8–3)	Lavietes Pavilion (1,636); Boston, MA
March 2, 2019; 7:00 pm, ESPN+		Princeton	W 66–58	16–9 (9–3)	Lavietes Pavilion (1,636); Boston, MA
March 8, 2019; 7:00 pm, ESPN+		at Cornell	L 59–72	16–10 (9–4)	Newman Arena; Ithaca, NY
March 9, 2019; 7:00 pm, ESPN+		at Columbia	W 83–81 ^{OT}	17–10 (10–4)	Levien Gymnasium; New York City, NY
Ivy League tournament
March 16, 2019; 12:30 pm, ESPNU	(1)	vs. (4) Penn; Semifinals	W 66–58	18–10	John J. Lee Amphitheater (2,532); New Haven, CT
March 17, 2019; 12:00 noon, ESPN2	(1)	at (2) Yale; Championship	L 85–97	18–11	John J. Lee Amphitheater (2,572); New Haven, CT
National Invitation tournament
March 20, 2019*; 7:00 pm, ESPN2	(6)	at (3) Georgetown; First Round – UNC Greensboro Bracket	W 71–68	19–11	McDonough Arena (2,253); Washington, DC
March 24, 2019*; 7:30 pm, ESPNU	(6)	at (2) NC State; Second Round – UNC Greensboro Bracket	L 77–78	19–12	Reynolds Coliseum; Raleigh, NC
*Non-conference game. ^{#}Rankings from AP Poll. (#) Tournament seedings in parentheses. All times are in Eastern.
