= 2018–19 Ivy League men's basketball season =

- League: NCAA Division I
- Sport: Basketball
- Duration: January 5 – March 17, 2019
- Teams: 8
- TV partner: Ivy League Digital Network

Regular season
- Champions: Harvard and Yale
- Season MVP: Miye Oni, Yale

2019 Ivy League men's basketball tournament
- Champions: Yale
- Runners-up: Harvard

Basketball seasons
- ← 2017–18 2019–20 →

2018–19 Ivy League men's basketball standings
	Conf.				Overall
Team	W		L	PCT	W		L	PCT
x-Harvard	10	–	4	.714	19	–	12	.613
x-Yale †	10	–	4	.714	22	–	8	.733
Princeton	8	–	6	.571	16	–	12	.571
Penn	7	–	7	.500	19	–	12	.613
Cornell	7	–	7	.500	15	–	16	.484
Brown	7	–	7	.500	20	–	12	.625
Columbia	5	–	9	.357	10	–	18	.357
Dartmouth	2	–	12	.143	11	–	19	.367
† 2019 Ivy League tournament winner x - Ivy League co-champions

The 2018–19 Ivy League men's basketball season marked the continuation of the annual tradition of competitive basketball among Ivy League members. The tradition began when the league was formed during the 1956–57 season and its history extends to the predecessor Eastern Intercollegiate Basketball League, which was formed in 1902.

Harvard and Yale co-shared the league title after finishing the regular season 10–4 within the Ivy League. Yale earned the league's bid to the 2019 NCAA Men's Division I Basketball Tournament after defeating Princeton in the semifinals and Harvard in the finals of the inaugural conference tournament.

Miye Oni of Yale was named Ivy League Men's Basketball Player of the Year.

== All-Ivy Teams ==
First Team All-Ivy
	School	Class	Position
A. J. Brodeur*	Penn	Junior	Forward
Bryce Aiken*	Harvard	Junior	Guard
Alex Copeland*	Yale	Senior	Guard
Matt Morgan*	Cornell	Senior	Guard
Miye Oni*	Yale	Junior	Guard
Myles Stephens*	Princeton	Senior	Guard

*Unanimous

Second Team All-Ivy
	School	Class	Position
Richmond Aririguzoh	Princeton	Junior	Center
Gabe Stefanini	Columbia	Sophomore	Guard
Devon Goodman	Penn	Junior	Guard
Chris Knight	Dartmouth	Sophomore	Forward
Obi Okolie	Brown	Senior	Guard
Tamenang Choh	Brown	Sophomore	Forward

== NCAA tournament ==
Seed	Region	School	First Four	Round of 64	Round of 32	Sweet 16	Elite Eight	Final Four	Championship
13	West	Yale	n/a	Eliminated by LSU, 79–74					
		W–L (%):	0–0 –	0–1 .000	0–0 –	0–0 –	0–0 –	0–0 –	0–0 –Total:0-1 .000
