= 2018–19 Yale Bulldogs men's basketball team =

American college basketball season

2018–19 Yale Bulldogs men's basketball

Ivy League regular season co-champions Ivy League Tournament champions

NCAA tournament, First Round
- Conference: Ivy League
- Record: 22–8 (10–4 Ivy)
- Head coach: James Jones (20th season)
- Assistant coaches: Matt Kingsley; Justin Simon; Tobe Carberry
- Home arena: John J. Lee Amphitheater

2018–19 Ivy League men's basketball standings
	Conf.				Overall
Team	W		L	PCT	W		L	PCT
x-Harvard	10	–	4	.714	19	–	12	.613
x-Yale †	10	–	4	.714	22	–	8	.733
Princeton	8	–	6	.571	16	–	12	.571
Penn	7	–	7	.500	19	–	12	.613
Cornell	7	–	7	.500	15	–	16	.484
Brown	7	–	7	.500	20	–	12	.625
Columbia	5	–	9	.357	10	–	18	.357
Dartmouth	2	–	12	.143	11	–	19	.367
† 2019 Ivy League tournament winner x - Ivy League co-champions

The 2018–19 Yale Bulldogs men's basketball team represented Yale University during the 2018–19 NCAA Division I men's basketball season. The Bulldogs, led by 20th-year head coach James Jones, played their home games at John J. Lee Amphitheater of the Payne Whitney Gymnasium in New Haven, Connecticut as members of the Ivy League. They finished the season 22–8 to finish a tie for 1st place. In the Ivy Tournament, they beat Princeton in the semifinals and beating Harvard in the Ivy Championship to win the Ivy League title. They received an automatic bid to the NCAA Tournament getting a 14th seed before losing to LSU in the first round.

== Previous season ==
The Bulldogs finished the 2017–18 season 16–15, 9–5 in Ivy League play to finish in third place. In the Ivy League tournament, they lost to Penn in the semifinal round.

== Offseason ==
=== Departures ===
Name	Number	Pos.	Height	Weight	Year	Hometown	Reason for departure
Noah Yates	4	F	6'7"	195	Senior	Point Pleasant Beach, NJ	Graduated
Eric Anderson	10	G	6'7"	220	Senior	West Chester, PA	Graduated
Makai Mason	11	G	6'1"	185	Senior	Greenfield, MA	Transferred to Baylor

== Roster ==
2018–19 Yale Bulldogs men's basketball team
Players
Coaches

Pos.	#	Name	Height	Weight	Year	Previous school	Hometown
G	00	Jalen Gabbidon	6 ft 5 in (1.96 m)	190 lb (86 kg)	So	Glenelg Country School	Harrisburg, PA
F	1	Eze Dike	6 ft 2 in (1.88 m)	195 lb (88 kg)	Fr	Kimball Union Academy	Montreal, QC
G	2	Eric Monroe	6 ft 2 in (1.88 m)	175 lb (79 kg)	Jr	St. Augustine	San Diego, CA
G	3	Alex Copeland	6 ft 3 in (1.91 m)	175 lb (79 kg)	Sr	Harvard-Westlake	Los Angeles, CA
G	5	Azar Swain	6 ft 0 in (1.83 m)	185 lb (84 kg)	So	The Rivers School	Brockton, MA
F	10	Matthue Cotton	6 ft 5 in (1.96 m)	200 lb (91 kg)	Fr	Eastern Regional	Voorhees, NJ
G	11	Michael Feinberg	6 ft 4 in (1.93 m)	195 lb (88 kg)	Fr	Sierra Canyon School	Hidden Hills, CA
G	13	Trey Phills	6 ft 2 in (1.88 m)	185 lb (84 kg)	Sr	Charlotte Christian	Charlotte, NC
F	14	Jameel Alausa	6 ft 7 in (2.01 m)	210 lb (95 kg)	So	Univ. of Chicago Lab	Chicago, IL
F	20	Paul Atkinson	6 ft 10 in (2.08 m)	220 lb (100 kg)	So	Westminster Academy	West Palm Beach, FL
F	22	Austin Williams	6 ft 8 in (2.03 m)	235 lb (107 kg)	Jr	Bolles School	Jacksonville, FL
F	23	Jordan Bruner	6 ft 9 in (2.06 m)	205 lb (93 kg)	Jr	Spring Valley	Columbia, SC
G	25	Miye Oni	6 ft 6 in (1.98 m)	210 lb (95 kg)	Jr	Viewpoint; Suffield Academy	Porter Ranch, CA
G	30	Jake Lanford	6 ft 10 in (2.08 m)	230 lb (104 kg)	Fr	Porter–Gaud School	Charleston, SC
F	32	Blake Reynolds	6 ft 7 in (2.01 m)	240 lb (109 kg)	Sr	Jackson	Jackson, MO
F	33	Wyatt Yess	6 ft 8 in (2.03 m)	220 lb (100 kg)	So	Parkway West	St. Louis, MO
G	34	Thomas Ryan	6 ft 4 in (1.93 m)	185 lb (84 kg)	Sr	Hotchkiss School	New York City, NY
F	35	Isaiah Kelly	6 ft 7 in (2.01 m)	215 lb (98 kg)	Fr	Pace Academy	Augusta, GA

Head coach

- James Jones (Albany)

Assistant coach(es)

- Matt Kingsley (Wesleyan)
- Justin Simon (Yale)
- Tobe Carberry (Vermont)

Legend

- (C) Team captain
- (S) Suspended
- (I) Ineligible
- (W) Walk-on
- Injured
- Current redshirt

Roster

== Schedule and results ==
Date time, TV	Rank^{#}	Opponent^{#}	Result	Record	Site (attendance) city, state
Non-conference regular season
November 9, 2018*; 11:00 pm, ESPNU		vs. California; Pac-12 China Game	W 76–59	1–0	Baoshan Sports Center (4,048); Shanghai, China
November 17, 2018*; 8:00 pm, ESPN3		at Memphis	L 102–109 ^{2OT}	1–1	FedExForum (14,646); Memphis, TN
November 21, 2018*; 7:00 pm, ESPN+		at Vermont	L 70–79	1–2	Patrick Gym (2,582); Burlington, VT
November 28, 2018*; 7:00 pm		at Bryant	W 103–61	2–2	Chace Athletic Center (982); Smithfield, RI
December 1, 2018*; 7:30 pm, ESPN3		at Miami (FL); Hoophall Miami Invitational	W 77–73	3–2	American Airlines Center (5,749); Miami, FL
December 5, 2018*; 7:00 pm, ESPN+		Lehigh	W 97–87	4–2	John J. Lee Amphitheater (847); New Haven, CT
December 8, 2018*; 5:30 pm, ESPN		at No. 3 Duke	L 58–91	4–3	Cameron Indoor Stadium (9,314); Durham, NC
December 11, 2018*; 7:00 pm, ESPN+		Albany	W 71–63	5–3	John J. Lee Amphitheater (904); New Haven, CT
December 20, 2018*; 7:00 pm, ESPN+		at Monmouth	W 66–58	6–3	OceanFirst Bank Center (4,100); West Long Branch, NJ
December 22, 2018*; 2:00 pm, ESPN+		Iona	W 99–84	7–3	John J. Lee Amphitheater (1,136); New Haven, CT
January 2, 2019*; 7:00 pm, ESPN+		Kennesaw State	W 92–65	8–3	John J. Lee Amphitheater (784); New Haven, CT
January 5, 2019*; 10:00 pm		at Cal State Northridge	W 94–90 ^{OT}	9–3	Matadome (1,138); Northridge, CA
January 8, 2019*; 7:00 pm, ESPN+		Skidmore	W 88–59	10–3	John J. Lee Amphitheater (632); New Haven, CT
Ivy League regular season
January 19, 2019; 3:30 pm, ESPN+		at Brown	W 70–67	11–3 (1–0)	Pizzitola Sports Center (1,363); Providence, RI
January 25, 2019; 7:00 pm, ESPN+		Brown	W 79–71	12–3 (2–0)	John J. Lee Amphitheater (2,094); New Haven, CT
February 1, 2019; 7:00 pm, ESPNU		at Harvard	L 49–65	12–4 (2–1)	Lavietes Pavilion (1,636); Allston, MA
February 2, 2019; 7:00 pm, ESPN+		at Dartmouth	W 89–68	13–4 (3–1)	Leede Arena (989); Hanover, NH
February 8, 2019; 7:00 pm, ESPN+		Princeton	W 74–60	14–4 (4–1)	John J. Lee Amphitheater (1,767); New Haven, CT
February 9, 2019; 7:00 pm, ESPN+		Penn	W 78–65	15–4 (5–1)	John J. Lee Amphitheater (2,185); New Haven, CT
February 15, 2019; 7:00 pm, ESPN+		at Columbia	W 70–64	16–4 (6–1)	Levien Gymnasium (1,532); New York, NY
February 16, 2019; 7:00 pm, ESPN+		at Cornell	W 98–92	17–4 (7–1)	Newman Arena (3,614); Ithaca, NY
February 22, 2019; 7:00 pm, ESPNews		Dartmouth	W 77–59	18–4 (8–1)	John J. Lee Amphitheater (1,241); New Haven, CT
February 23, 2019; 7:00 pm, ESPN+		Harvard	L 86–88	18–5 (8–2)	John J. Lee Amphitheater (2,532); New Haven, CT
March 1, 2019; 7:00 pm, ESPN+		Cornell	W 88–65	19–5 (9–2)	John J. Lee Amphitheater (1,344); New Haven, CT
March 2, 2019; 7:00 pm, ESPN+		Columbia	L 75–83	19–6 (9–3)	John J. Lee Amphitheater (1,688); New Haven, CT
March 8, 2019; 7:00 pm, ESPN+		at Penn	L 66–77	19–7 (9–4)	The Palestra (2,968); Philadelphia, PA
March 9, 2019; 6:00 pm, ESPN+		at Princeton	W 81–59	20–7 (10–4)	Jadwin Gymnasium (2,794); Princeton, NJ
Ivy League Tournament
March 16, 2019; 3:00 pm, ESPNU	(2)	(3) Princeton; Semifinals	W 83–77	21–7	John J. Lee Amphitheater (2,633); New Haven, CT
March 17, 2019; 12:00 pm, ESPN2	(2)	(1) Harvard; Championship	W 97–85	22–7	John J. Lee Amphitheater (2,572); New Haven, CT
NCAA Tournament
March 21, 2019; 12:40 pm, truTV	(14 E)	vs. (3 E) No. 12 LSU; First Round	L 74–79	22–8	VyStar Veterans Memorial Arena (12,429); Jacksonville, FL
*Non-conference game. ^{#}Rankings from AP Poll. (#) Tournament seedings in parentheses. All times are in Eastern Time.
