= Miye Oni =

Nigerian-American basketball player (born 1997)

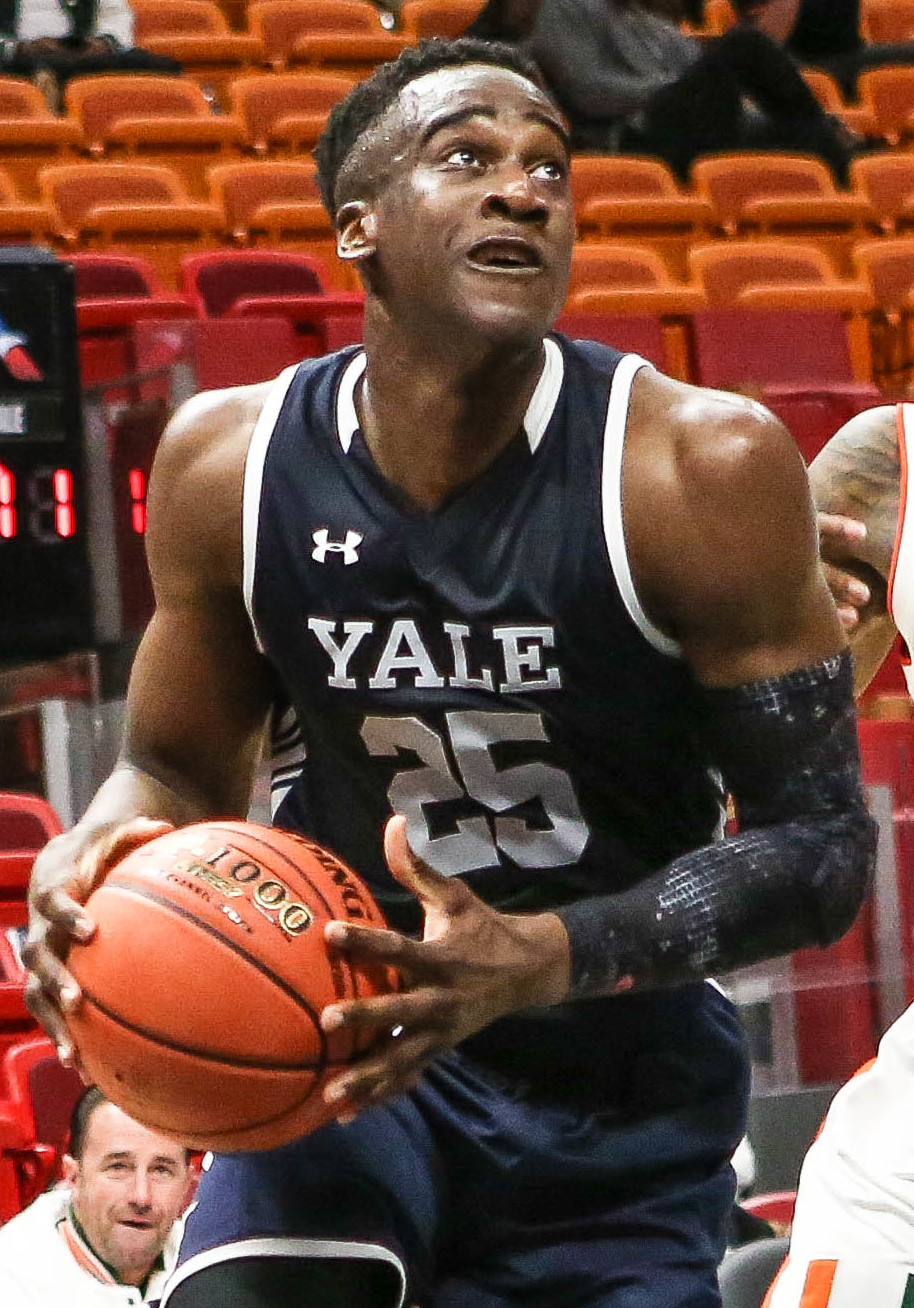
- Oni with the Yale Bulldogs in 2018

No. 33 – San Diego Clippers
- Position: Shooting guard / small forward
- League: NBA G League

Personal information
- Born: August 4, 1997 (age 29) Los Angeles, California, U.S.
- Listed height: 6 ft 5 in (1.96 m)
- Listed weight: 206 lb (93 kg)

Career information
- High school: Sierra Canyon School (Los Angeles, California); Viewpoint School (Calabasas, California); Suffield Academy (Suffield, Connecticut)
- College: Yale (2016–2019)
- NBA draft: 2019: 2nd round, 58th overall pick
- Drafted by: Golden State Warriors
- Playing career: 2019–present

Career history
- 2019–2022: Utah Jazz
- 2022–2023: London Lions
- 2023–2024: Osceola Magic
- 2024–2025: Joventut Badalona
- 2025: Criollos de Caguas
- 2025: Al-Ahly Ly
- 2026: Indios de Mayagüez
- 2026: Osos de Manatí
- 2026–present: San Diego Clippers

Career highlights
- Ivy League Player of the Year (2019); 2× First-team All-Ivy League (2018, 2019); Second-team All-Ivy League (2017)
- Stats at NBA.com
- Stats at Basketball Reference

Olumiye Dimolu "Miye" Oni (born August 4, 1997) is an American-Nigerian professional basketball player for the San Diego Clippers of the NBA G League. He played college basketball for the Yale Bulldogs. He plays the shooting guard position. Oni was named Ivy League Player of the Year in 2019 and was a three-time All-Ivy League selection.

Oni, who is of Nigerian descent, grew up in Northridge, Los Angeles and began playing high school basketball at Viewpoint School, where he was named the divisional player of the year. He was lightly recruited at Viewpoint and committed to Williams College of the NCAA Division III. After drawing more interest as a senior at Viewpoint, he committed to Yale, but admissions rules forced him to play an additional season of prep basketball at Suffield Academy before college.

== Early life ==
Oni was born to Nigerian parents Opeyemi and Oludotun Oni. His father is a professor at the University of Phoenix and an engineer. Oni began playing basketball at age two with a toy hoop and joined a YMCA league with his older sister at age five. From a young age, he had aspirations to play in the National Basketball Association (NBA) and admired Kobe Bryant of the Los Angeles Lakers. In addition to basketball, he played football, mainly as a safety and wide receiver, and baseball.

== High school career ==
Oni began his freshman year at Sierra Canyon School in Chatsworth, California, but transferred to enroll and play basketball at Viewpoint School in Calabasas, California before the season started. He played for the junior varsity team in his freshman season, when he stood 5 feet 9 inches (1.75 m) and weighed 140 pounds (64 kg). He did not play on the school's basketball team as a sophomore to focus on his education. As a junior, Oni suffered a knee injury that sidelined him for most of the season. The injury hindered his college recruiting because he did not have film to show college coaches before his senior year. Oni stood 6 feet 4 inches (1.93 m) and weighed 180 pounds (82 kg) by the time he was a senior. He had a breakout final season for Viewpoint, averaging 18 points, 9 rebounds, and 4 assists and being named California Interscholastic Federation (CIF) Division 5AA player of the year.

At Viewpoint, Oni did not draw interest from NCAA Division I basketball programs and was only recruited by Division III school Williams College, where he committed in the fall of his senior year of high school. However, Williams did not offer enough financial aid for his family to meet the cost of attendance. During his senior season at Viewpoint, Oni attracted attention from Yale assistant coach Matt Kingsley. After watching his highlight video in the spring of 2015, Yale head coach James Jones offered him, and Oni committed to play for the team on July 1, 2015. However, since Yale admissions were closed, he spent his next season playing for Suffield Academy, a prep school in Suffield, Connecticut, located near Yale University.

With Suffield, Oni averaged 17 points, 6 rebounds and 5 assists and earned New England Preparatory School Athletic Council (NEPSAC) Class A player of the year distinction. On February 5, 2016, he scored 52 points with 11 three-pointers versus Wilbraham & Monson Academy at the National Prep School Invitational, breaking his school record and Shabazz Napier's tournament record. Oni was named most outstanding player of the event. He was a nominee for the 2016 McDonald's All-American Boys Game.

== College career ==
=== Freshman season ===
Oni made his debut for Yale on November 13, 2016, recording a team-high 24 points, 6 rebounds, and 3 assists in a 98–90 upset win over Washington. In his next game, he posted 13 points, 10 rebounds, and a season-best 5 blocks in an 89–81 victory over Lehigh. Oni claimed Ivy League Rookie of the Week honors in each of his first three weeks with Yale. On February 25, 2017, he scored a season-high 27 points while chipping in 7 rebounds and 4 assists, in a 99–86 win over Dartmouth. By the end of the season, Oni was averaging 12.9 points, 6.3 rebounds, and 2.7 assists per game. He earned second-team All-Ivy League recognition and was named conference Rookie of the Week on five occasions during the season.

=== Sophomore season ===
Entering the 2017–18 season, the Hartford Courant speculated that the Yale duo of Oni and Makai Mason could be "one of the top backcourts in the country." On November 14, 2017, his third appearance in his sophomore season, he led all scorers with 20 points in an 86–54 victory over South Carolina State. Oni erupted for 26 points, his best mark in the season, and recorded team-highs of 7 rebounds and 4 assists on November 25, in a 79–73 loss to Vermont. On February 24, 2018, he flirted with a triple-double in an 83–73 win over Columbia, matching his season-high of 26 points while leading his team with 9 rebounds and 8 assists. Through 29 games, Oni averaged 15.1 points, 6.0 rebounds, and 3.6 assists per game, leading Yale in all three categories. He tied the school record for three-pointers attempted in a single season, with 184. Oni was a three-time Ivy League Player of the Week, unanimous first-team All-Ivy League pick, and National Association of Basketball Coaches (NABC) District 13 second-team selection.

=== Junior season ===
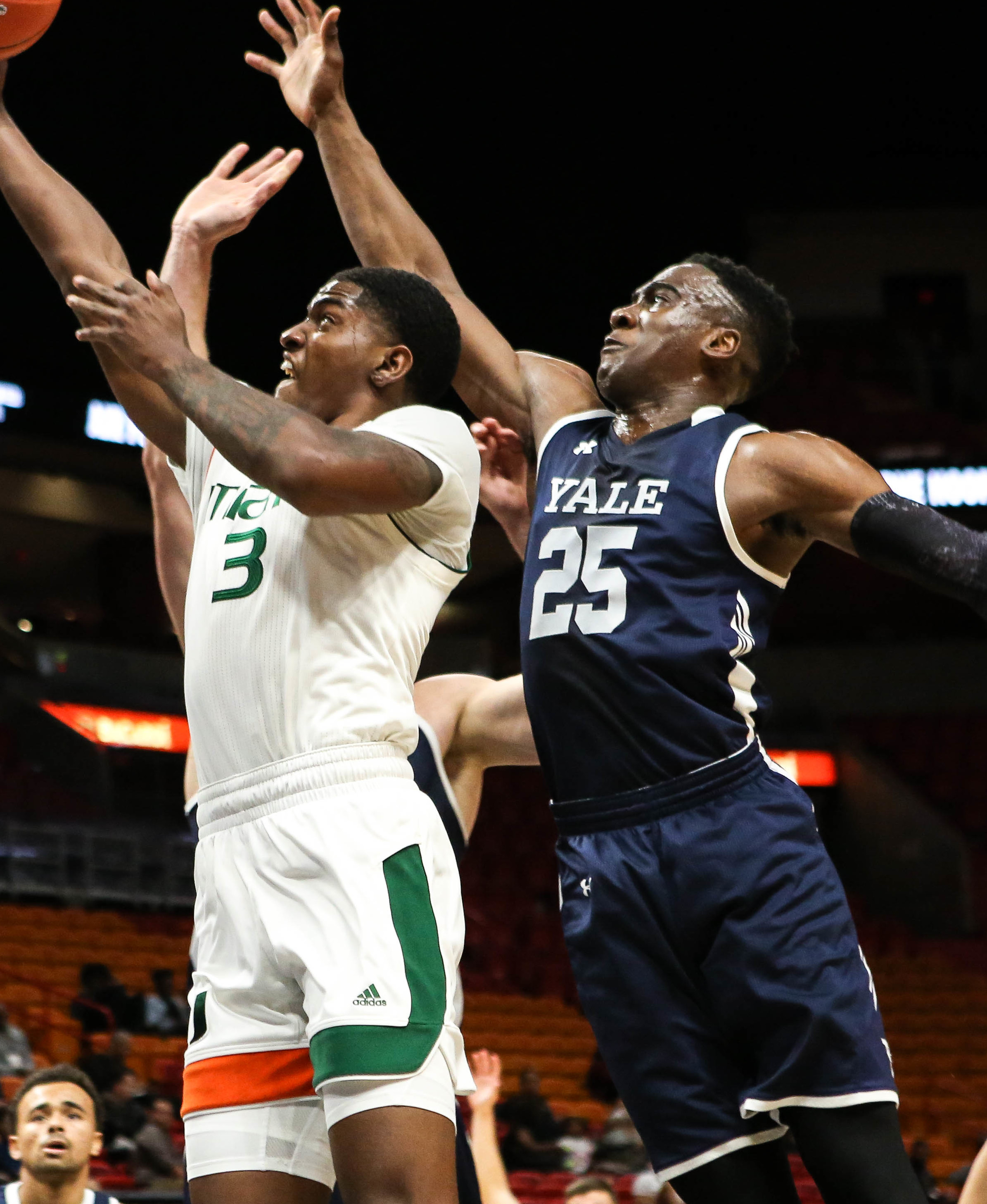
Oni (right) skies for a block in December 2018.

Oni made his junior season debut on November 9, 2018, scoring 16 points in a 76–59 win over California at the Pac-12 China Game held in Shanghai. On November 21, he posted his first double-double of the season, leading his team with 18 points and 10 rebounds in a 79–70 loss to Vermont. On December 1, Oni scored 29 points and was named game MVP in a 77–73 victory over Miami (Florida) at the Hoophall Miami Invitational. He erupted for 31 points, 9 rebounds, and 4 assists, leading his team in each category, on February 2, 2019, in an 89–68 win over Dartmouth. Oni was the first Yale player to record a 30-point game since Anthony Dallier in 2017. In his next game, a 74–60 victory over Princeton, he posted a career-high 35 points, 12 rebounds, and 3 blocks. Oni scored the most single-game points in school history since Greg Mangano in 2012. He delivered another strong performance on March 1, when he scored 30 points—shooting 9-of-11 from the field—to help Yale defeat Cornell, 88–65, and clinch a spot in the 2019 Ivy league tournament. By the end of the regular season, Oni was averaging a team-best 17.4 points, 6.3 rebounds, and 3.6 assists per game. He was named Ivy League Player of the Year, becoming the third Yale player to win the award.

In his junior season, Oni frequently attracted attention from NBA scouts, who visited all of his games to see him play. He was considered a top-50 prospect for the 2019 NBA draft and became the first Ivy League player to be drafted since 1995. In December 2018, Duke head coach Mike Krzyzewski predicted that he would be a first-round pick.

== Professional career ==
=== Utah Jazz (2019–2022) ===
On June 20, 2019, Oni was selected as the 58th pick of the 2019 NBA draft by the Golden State Warriors. His draft rights were traded to the Utah Jazz. With the selection, Oni became the first Ivy League men's basketball player picked in the NBA draft since Jerome Allen in 1995 and the first Yale Bulldogs men's basketball player picked since Chris Dudley in 1987. On July 15, 2019, the Utah Jazz signed Oni. He was assigned to the Salt Lake City Stars for the start of the NBA G League season. He scored a season-high 28 points for the Stars in a win over the Memphis Hustle on January 10, 2020. The 2019-2020 Salt Lake City Stars ended up breaking the NBA G League record for most consecutive wins with 14 and finished the season with the best record. Oni averaged 12.7 points, 6.1 rebounds, and 4 assists in all contests.

Later in his rookie season, Oni began to get looked on to play for the Jazz, as injuries to Bojan Bogdanovic left a hole in the team heading into the NBA Bubble. On August 7, 2020, Oni recorded his first start and scored his NBA career high 14 points and 7 rebounds for the Jazz in a loss to the San Antonio Spurs.

In his second year with the Jazz, Oni became a rotation regular, often filling in for injuries at the guard position. Oni appeared in 54 of the 72 regular season games, and the Jazz finished the season with a league best 52–20 record and the top seed in the Western Conference. Oni was called upon to play key minutes for the Jazz in the 2022 NBA Playoffs, notably matching up with Paul George of the Los Angeles Clippers.

In his third season with the Jazz, new additions to the roster led to Oni falling out of the rotation. On January 4, 2022, Oni was traded to the Oklahoma City Thunder along with a 2028 second-round pick in exchange for cash considerations. Three days later, he was waived.

On February 4, 2022, Oni signed a 10-day hardship contract with the New Orleans Pelicans.

Oni joined the Dallas Mavericks for the 2022 NBA Summer League,

=== London Lions (2022–2023) ===
On November 16, 2022, Oni signed with London Lions of the British Basketball League. He became the 4th former NBA draft pick to sign with the Lions in 2022, joining Sam Dekker, Kosta Koufos, and Tomislav Zubčić. In their first season in the EuroCup, the Lions became the first British club in history to clinch a berth in the EuroCup Playoffs.

=== Osceola Magic (2023–2024) ===
On October 13, 2023, Oni signed with the Orlando Magic, but was waived five days later. On November 2, he joined the Osceola Magic.

On September 6, 2024, Oni signed with the Memphis Grizzlies, but was waived on October 19.

=== Joventut Badalona (2024–2025) ===
On December 16, 2024, Oni signed with Joventut Badalona of the Liga ACB.

On March 6, 2025, Oni reached an agreement with the club to conclude the contract for personal reasons.

=== Criollos de Caguas (2025) ===
On 17 March, 2025, Oni made his debut with Criollos de Caguas in the Baloncesto Superior Nacional (BSN), the top professional league in Puerto Rico. On April 21, 2025, Oni had 33 points with 6 3PT, 7 rebounds, and 7 assists in a win.

On 17 March, 2026, Oni was traded to the Indios de Mayagüez in exchange for Milton Doyle.

== National team career ==
Oni was eligible to play for the Nigeria men's national basketball team at the 2020 Summer Olympics in Tokyo due to his mother being born there. He saw significant minutes and made the go-ahead three point field goal when Nigeria upset the United States men's national basketball team in an exhibition game prior to the start of the Games. Oni then appeared in all three games in Tokyo, starting two of the three and averaging 21.8 minutes which was second on the team. Against Germany, he was 5-of-6 from three-point range and finished with 15 points.

== Career statistics ==
Legend
GP	Games played	GS	Games started	MPG	Minutes per game
FG%	Field goal percentage	3P%	3-point field goal percentage	FT%	Free throw percentage
RPG	Rebounds per game	APG	Assists per game	SPG	Steals per game
BPG	Blocks per game	PPG	Points per game	**Bold**	Career high

=== NBA ===
==== Regular season ====
Year	Team	GP	GS	MPG	FG%	3P%	FT%	RPG	APG	SPG	BPG	PPG
2019–20	Utah	10	**1**	**10.9**	**.375**	**.368**	.800	**1.7**	.4	**.4**	**.2**	**3.5**
2020–21	Utah	**54**	0	9.6	.354	.341	**.833**	1.6	**.5**	.2	.1	1.9
2021–22	Utah	16	0	2.8	.222	.125	.000	.4	.3	.0	.0	.3
Career		80	1	8.4	.350	.330	.750	1.4	.5	.2	.1	1.8

==== Playoffs ====
Year	Team	GP	GS	MPG	FG%	3P%	FT%	RPG	APG	SPG	BPG	PPG
2020	Utah	2	0	**7.0**	**.500**	**.250**	—	**2.0**	.0	**.5**	**.5**	**3.5**
2021	Utah	**8**	0	5.1	.000	.000	—	.4	.0	.1	.0	.0
Career		10	0	5.5	.273	.111	—	.7	.0	.2	.1	.7

=== College ===
Year	Team	GP	GS	MPG	FG%	3P%	FT%	RPG	APG	SPG	BPG	PPG
2016–17	Yale	**29**	**28**	31.2	**.441**	**.396**	.784	**6.3**	2.7	.7	1.1	12.9
2017–18	Yale	**29**	26	**32.8**	.405	.310	.750	6.0	**3.6**	**.9**	.8	15.1
2018–19	Yale	**29**	**28**	31.0	**.441**	.371	**.793**	**6.3**	**3.6**	**.9**	**1.3**	**17.1**
Career		87	82	31.7	.428	.356	.777	6.2	3.3	.9	1.0	15.0

== Personal life ==
At Yale University, Oni was a major in political science. He has been praised for his academic performance, with Yale assistant basketball coach Justin Simon saying, "To maintain his grades at the level he has—the guys respect his work ethic." After being drafted, Yale allowed him to complete his degree.

=== Community Engagement: Court Appointed Special Advocates (CASA) Movement for Children ===
Miye Oni is one of two inaugural ambassadors for Connecticut CASA, part of the national CASA network for children who have experienced abuse or neglect. He was also involved with Utah CASA. On a volunteer basis, Oni and Brandon Sherrod (his fellow Connecticut CASA ambassador) participated in an awareness-raising forum recorded on YouTube and documented in an October 2020 news story.
