= 2018–19 Cornell Big Red men's basketball team =

American college basketball season

2018–19 Cornell Big Red men's basketball

CIT, First round
- Conference: Ivy League
- Record: 15–16 (7–7 Ivy)
- Head coach: Brian Earl (3rd season)
- Assistant coaches: Jon Jaques; Donovan Williams; Alex Mumphard
- Home arena: Newman Arena

2018–19 Ivy League men's basketball standings
	Conf.				Overall
Team	W		L	PCT	W		L	PCT
x-Harvard	10	–	4	.714	19	–	12	.613
x-Yale †	10	–	4	.714	22	–	8	.733
Princeton	8	–	6	.571	16	–	12	.571
Penn	7	–	7	.500	19	–	12	.613
Cornell	7	–	7	.500	15	–	16	.484
Brown	7	–	7	.500	20	–	12	.625
Columbia	5	–	9	.357	10	–	18	.357
Dartmouth	2	–	12	.143	11	–	19	.367
† 2019 Ivy League tournament winner x - Ivy League co-champions

The 2018–19 Cornell Big Red men's basketball team represented Cornell University during the 2018–19 NCAA Division I men's basketball season. The Big Red, led by third-year head coach Brian Earl, played their home games at Newman Arena in Ithaca, New York as members of the Ivy League.

== Previous season ==
The Big Red finished the season 12–16, 6–8 in Ivy League play to finish in fourth place. They lost in the semifinals of the Ivy League tournament to Harvard.

== Offseason ==
=== Departures ===
Name	Number	Pos.	Height	Weight	Year	Hometown	Reason for departure
Jordan Abdur-Ra'oof	12	F	6'8"	220	Senior	Rockville, MD	Graduated
Kyle Brown	1	G	6'3'	170	Senior	Bellevue, WA	Graduated
Will Bathurst	2	G/F	6'3"	188	Senior	Olean, NY	Graduated
Pat Smith	24	G/F	6'5"	204	Senior	Chalfont, PA	Graduated

== Roster ==
2017–18 Cornell Big Red men's basketball team
Players
Coaches

Pos.	#	Name	Height	Weight	Year	Previous school	Hometown
G	1	Matt Harshany	6 ft 0 in (1.83 m)	180 lb (82 kg)	Fr	Narvarre	Pace, FL
F	12	Kobe Dickson	6 ft 9 in (2.06 m)	235 lb (107 kg)	Fr	Holcomb	Holcomb, Kan.
G	24	Max Samberg	6 ft 3 in (1.91 m)	190 lb (86 kg)	Fr	Rye	Rye, NY
G	25	Dean Koll	6 ft 2 in (1.88 m)	180 lb (82 kg)	Fr	Shawnee	Medford, NJ
F	3	Jimmy Boeheim	6 ft 8 in (2.03 m)	215 lb (98 kg)	So	Jamesville-DeWitt HS	Fayetteville, NY
G	4	Troy Whiteside	6 ft 4 in (1.93 m)	188 lb (85 kg)	Sr	The Webb School	Knoxville, TN
G	5	Bryan Knapp	6 ft 1 in (1.85 m)	170 lb (77 kg)	So	Charles E. Smith Jewish Day	Washington, D.C.
G	10	Matt Morgan	6 ft 2 in (1.88 m)	174 lb (79 kg)	Sr	Cox Mill HS	Concord, NC
G	11	Terrance McBride	6 ft 2 in (1.88 m)	170 lb (77 kg)	So	Sierra Canyon HS	Lynwood, CA
F	13	Stone Gettings	6 ft 9 in (2.06 m)	234 lb (106 kg)	Sr	Loyola HS	Calabasas, CA
F	21	Riley Voss	6 ft 6 in (1.98 m)	220 lb (100 kg)	So	Moeller HS	Milford, OH
F	22	Josh Warren	6 ft 8 in (2.03 m)	223 lb (101 kg)	Jr	Downington West HS	Downingtown, PA
G	23	Joel Davis	6 ft 2 in (1.88 m)	176 lb (80 kg)	Sr	Wayne Country Day School	Goldsboro, NC
G/F	25	Jake Kuhn	6 ft 6 in (1.98 m)	195 lb (88 kg)	So	St. Maria Goretti HS	Bethesda, MD
G	32	Jack Gordon	6 ft 5 in (1.96 m)	189 lb (86 kg)	Sr	St. Mark's School	Dallas, TX
F	33	Steven Julian	6 ft 6 in (1.98 m)	200 lb (91 kg)	Sr	Male HS; Kaskaskia College	Louisville, KY

Head coach

- Brian Earl (Princeton)

Assistant coach(es)

- Jon Jaques (Cornell)
- Donovan Williams (Park)
- Alex Mumphard (Greenville)

Legend

- (C) Team captain
- (S) Suspended
- (I) Ineligible
- (W) Walk-on
- Injured
- Current redshirt

Roster

== Schedule and results ==
Date time, TV	Rank^{#}	Opponent^{#}	Result	Record	Site (attendance) city, state
Exhibition
October 30, 2018*; 7:00 pm		at Ithaca College	W 98–61		Newman Arena; Ithaca, NY
Non-conference regular season
November 6, 2018*; 8:00 pm, ESPN+		at Binghamton	W 86–75	1–0	Binghamton University Events Center (2,120); Binghamton, NY
November 8, 2018*; 7:00 pm, ESPN+		SUNY Canton	W 86–44	2–0	Newman Arena (864); Ithaca, NY
November 11, 2018*; 1:00 pm, ESPN+		Colgate	L 57–73	2–1	Newman Arena (1,266); Ithaca, NY
November 15, 2018*; 7:00 pm, ESPN+		Delaware	L 56–73	2–2	Newman Arena (463); Ithaca, NY
November 17, 2018*; 4:00 pm, ESPN+		NJIT	W 86–73	3–2	Wellness and Events Center (637); Newark, NJ
November 20, 2018*; 7:00 pm, SNY/ESPN3		at UConn	L 74–91	3–3	XL Center (7,328); Hartford, CT
November 28, 2018*; 7:00 pm, Stadium		at Lafayette	W 63–58 ^{OT}	4–3	Kirby Sports Center (988); Easton, PA
December 1, 2018*; 8:00 pm, ESPNU		at Syracuse	L 55–63	4–4	Carrier Dome (21,547); Syracuse, NY
December 16, 2018*; 1:00 pm		Niagara	L 74–77	4–5	Gallagher Center (865); Lewiston, NY
December 17, 2017*; 7:00 pm, ESPN+		Longwood	W 70–64	5–5	Newman Arena (686); Ithaca, NY
December 19, 2018*; 7:00 pm, ESPN+		at Toledo	L 70–86	5–6	Savage Arena (3,748); Toledo, OH
December 22, 2018*; 7:00 pm, ESPN3		at Southern Methodist	L 53–81	5–7	Moody Coliseum (6,067); Dallas, TX
December 30, 2018*; 1:00 pm, ESPN+		Navy	W 61–50	6–7	Newman Arena (1,284); Ithaca, NY
January 2, 2019*; 7:00 pm, ACCN Extra		Wake Forest	L 61–83	6–8	LJVM Coliseum (4,878); Winston-Salem, NC
January 4, 2019*; 7:00 pm, ESPN+		Johnson & Wales (RI)	W 76–61	7–8	Newman Arena (957); Ithaca, NY
January 9, 2019*; 7:00 pm		Towson	W 86–74	8–8	SECU Arena (1,123); Towson, MD
Ivy League regular season
January 19, 2019; 4:00 pm, ESPN+		Columbia	W 60–59	9–8 (1–0)	Newman Arena (1,642); Ithaca, NY
January 26, 2019; 7:00 pm, SNY		at Columbia	L 70–73	9–9 (1–1)	Levien Gymnasium (2,312); New York, NY
February 1, 2019; 5:00 pm, ESPN+		Penn	W 80–71	10–9 (2–1)	Newman Arena (1,741); Ithaca, NY
February 2, 2019; 8:00 pm, ESPN+		Princeton	L 61–70 ^{OT}	10–10 (2–2)	Newman Arena (1,807); Ithaca, NY
February 8, 2019; 7:00 pm, ESPN+		at Dartmouth	W 83–80	11–10 (3–2)	Leede Arena (601); Hanover, NH
February 9, 2019; 7:00 pm, ESPN+		at Harvard	W 67–61	12–10 (4–2)	Lavietes Pavilion (1,528); Cambridge, MA
February 15, 2019; 7:00 pm, ESPN+		Brown	W 70–66 ^{OT}	13–10 (5–2)	Newman Arena (2,966); Ithaca, NY
February 16, 2019; 7:00 pm, ESPN+		Yale	L 92–98	13–11 (5–3)	Newman Arena (3,614); Ithaca, NY
February 22, 2019; 7:00 pm, ESPN+		at Princeton	L 59–68	13–12 (5–4)	Jadwin Gymnasium (1,840); Princeton, NJ
February 23, 2019; 7:00 pm, ESPN+		at Penn	L 50–68	13–13 (5–5)	The Palestra (4,298); Philadelphia, PA
March 1, 2019; 7:00 pm, ESPN+		at Yale	L 65–88	13–14 (5–6)	John J. Lee Amphitheater (1,344); New Haven, CT
March 2, 2019; 7:00 pm, ESPN+		at Brown	L 51–75	13–15 (5–7)	Pizzitola Sports Center (1,574); Providence, RI
March 8, 2019; 7:00 pm, ESPN+		Harvard	W 72–59	14–15 (6–7)	Newman Arena; Ithaca, NY
March 9, 2019; 7:00 pm, ESPN+		Dartmouth	W 66–51	15–15 (7–7)	Newman Arena (1,862); Ithaca, NY
CollegeInsider.com Postseason tournament
March 19, 2019*; 7:00 pm		at Robert Morris; First round	L 89–98 ^{OT}	15–16	North Athletic Complex; Pittsburgh, PA
*Non-conference game. ^{#}Rankings from AP Poll. (#) Tournament seedings in parentheses. All times are in Eastern Time.
