= 2018–19 Columbia Lions men's basketball team =

American college basketball season

2018–19 Columbia Lions men's basketball
- Conference: Ivy League
- Record: 10–18 (5–9 Ivy)
- Head coach: Jim Engles (3rd season)
- Assistant coaches: Kenny Blakeney; Jared Czech; Steve Ongley; Jesse Agel
- Home arena: Levien Gymnasium

2018–19 Ivy League men's basketball standings
	Conf.				Overall
Team	W		L	PCT	W		L	PCT
x-Harvard	10	–	4	.714	19	–	12	.613
x-Yale †	10	–	4	.714	22	–	8	.733
Princeton	8	–	6	.571	16	–	12	.571
Penn	7	–	7	.500	19	–	12	.613
Cornell	7	–	7	.500	15	–	16	.484
Brown	7	–	7	.500	20	–	12	.625
Columbia	5	–	9	.357	10	–	18	.357
Dartmouth	2	–	12	.143	11	–	19	.367
† 2019 Ivy League tournament winner x - Ivy League co-champions

The 2018–19 Columbia Lions men's basketball team represented Columbia University in the 2018–19 NCAA Division I men's basketball season. They played their home games at Levien Gymnasium in New York City and were led by third-year head coach Jim Engles, as members of the Ivy League. They finished the season 10–18, 5–9 in Ivy League play, to finish in seventh place. They failed to qualify for the Ivy League tournament.

== Previous season ==
The Lions finished the 2017–18 season 8–19, 5–9 in Ivy League play, to finish in a tie for fifth place and failed to qualify for the Ivy League tournament.

== Roster ==
2018–19 Columbia Lions men's basketball team
Players
Coaches

Pos.	#	Name	Height	Weight	Year	Previous school	Hometown
G	1	Luke Bolster	6 ft 0 in (1.83 m)	170 lb (77 kg)	So	Trinity School	New York, NY
G	2	Ben Milstein	5 ft 10 in (1.78 m)	165 lb (75 kg)	Fr	Saint Andrew's School	Boca Raton, FL
F	3	Patrick Tapé	6 ft 10 in (2.08 m)	220 lb (100 kg)	Jr	Queen's Grant	Charlotte, NC
G/F	4	Rodney Hunter	6 ft 5 in (1.96 m)	200 lb (91 kg)	Sr	Mariner	Cape Coral, FL
G	5	CJ Davis	6 ft 2 in (1.88 m)	205 lb (93 kg)	Sr	The Peddie School	Far Rockaway, NY
G	10	Quinton Adlesh	6 ft 0 in (1.83 m)	195 lb (88 kg)	Sr	Mission College Prep	Arroyo Grande, CA
G	12	Peter Barba	6 ft 5 in (1.96 m)	198 lb (90 kg)	Sr	Western Reserve Academy	Chagrin Falls, OH
F	13	Randy Brumant	6 ft 7 in (2.01 m)	200 lb (91 kg)	So	Kent School	Houston, TX
G	15	Gabe Stefanini	6 ft 3 in (1.91 m)	198 lb (90 kg)	So	Bergen Catholic	Bologna, Italy
G	20	Jake Killingsworth	6 ft 5 in (1.96 m)	205 lb (93 kg)	Jr	Junípero Serra	San Carlos, CA
G	21	Mike Smith	5 ft 11 in (1.8 m)	180 lb (82 kg)	Jr	Fenwick	Burr Ridge, IL
F	22	Ike Nweke	6 ft 7 in (2.01 m)	240 lb (109 kg)	Fr	Georgetown Prep	Woodbine, MD
G	25	Jake Klores	6 ft 0 in (1.83 m)	165 lb (75 kg)	So	Riverdale Country School	New York, NY
G	32	Maka Ellis	6 ft 5 in (1.96 m)	185 lb (84 kg)	Fr	Sierra Vista	Las Vegas, NV
G	33	Tai Bibbs	6 ft 3 in (1.91 m)	170 lb (77 kg)	So	West Chicago	Chicago, IL
F/C	50	Joseph Smoyer	6 ft 11 in (2.11 m)	230 lb (104 kg)	Jr	Franklin	Portland, OR

Head coach

- Jim Engles (Dickinson)

Assistant coach(es)

- Kenny Blakeney (Duke)
- Jared Czech (Manhattanville)
- Steve Ongley (Colby–Sawyer)
- Jesse Agel (Vermont)

Legend

- (C) Team captain
- (S) Suspended
- (I) Ineligible
- (W) Walk-on
- Injured
- Current redshirt

Roster
Last update: July 19, 2024

== Schedule and results ==
Date time, TV	Rank^{#}	Opponent^{#}	Result	Record	Site (attendance) city, state
Non-conference regular season
November 10, 2018*; 7:00 p.m., ESPN3		at Marist	L 76–82	0–1	McCann Arena (1,413); Poughkeepsie, NY
November 16, 2018*; 8:30 p.m.		vs. Youngstown State; John Bach Classic	L 83–94	0–2	Rose Hill Gymnasium (1,765); The Bronx, NY
November 17, 2018*; 6:00 p.m.		vs. FIU; John Bach Classic	L 87–98	0–3	Rose Hill Gymnasium (1,834); The Bronx, NY
November 18, 2018*; 5:00 p.m.		at Fordham; John Bach Classic	L 69–70	0–4	Rose Hill Gymnasium (1,917); The Bronx, NY
November 25, 2018*; 2:00 p.m., ESPN+		St. Joseph's College	W 85–38	1–4	Levien Gymnasium (755); New York, NY
December 2, 2018*; 2:00 p.m., ESPN+		Delaware	L 86–87 ^{2OT}	1–5	Levien Gymnasium (1,125); New York, NY
December 5, 2018*; 7:00 p.m., ESPN+		Colgate	L 62–64	1–6	Levien Gymnasium (749); New York, NY
December 7, 2018*; 7:00 p.m., ESPN+		Bryant	W 90–68	2–6	Levien Gymnasium (949); New York, NY
December 9, 2018*; 11:00 a.m., FS1		vs. Iona; MSG Holiday Festival	W 74–71	3–6	Madison Square Garden (10,078); New York, NY
December 12, 2018*; 7:00 p.m., ACCN Extra		at Boston College	L 73–82	3–7	Conte Forum (3,295); Chestnut Hill, MA
December 22, 2018*; 1:00 p.m., BTNPlus		at Rutgers	L 65–68	3–8	Louis Brown Athletic Center (5,231); Piscataway, NJ
December 30, 2018*; 4:00 p.m., BTNPlus		at Northwestern	L 54–75	3–9	Welsh–Ryan Arena (6,714); Evanston, IL
January 2, 2019*; 7:00 p.m., ESPN+		at Binghamton	W 65–63	4–9	Binghamton University Events Center (1,624); Vestal, NY
January 12, 2019*; 2:00 p.m., ESPN+		Elmira	W 102–63	5–9	Levien Gymnasium (1,226); New York, NY
Ivy League regular season
January 19, 2019; 4:00 p.m., ESPN+		at Cornell	L 59–60	5–10 (0–1)	Newman Arena (1,642); Ithaca, NY
January 26, 2019; 7:00 p.m., SNY		Cornell	W 73–70	6–10 (1–1)	Levien Gymnasium (2,312); New York, NY
February 1, 2019; 7:00 p.m., SNY/ESPN+		Princeton	L 43–55	6–11 (1–2)	Levien Gymnasium (1,932); New York, NY
February 2, 2019; 8:00 p.m., ESPN+		Penn	L 70–72	6–12 (1–3)	Levien Gymnasium (2,409); New York, NY
February 8, 2019; 7:00 p.m., ESPN+		at Harvard	L 96–98 ^{3OT}	6–13 (1–4)	Lavietes Pavilion (1,636); Boston, MA
February 9, 2019; 7:00 p.m., ESPN+		at Dartmouth	L 66–82	6–14 (1–5)	Leede Arena (1,021); Hanover, NH
February 15, 2019; 7:00 p.m., SNY		Yale	L 64–70	6–15 (1–6)	Levien Gymnasium (1,532); New York, NY
February 16, 2019; 7:00 p.m., SNY/ESPN+		Brown	L 63–65	6–16 (1–7)	Levien Gymnasium (1,652); New York, NY
February 22, 2019; 8:00 p.m., ESPN+		at Penn	W 79–77 ^{OT}	7–16 (2–7)	The Palestra (2,906); Philadelphia, PA
February 23, 2019; 8:00 p.m., ESPN+		at Princeton	L 61–79	7–17 (2–8)	Jadwin Gymnasium (1,940); Princeton, NJ
March 1, 2019; 5:00 p.m., ESPNU		at Brown	W 80–77	8–17 (3–8)	Pizzitola Sports Center (2,015); Providence, RI
March 2, 2019; 7:00 p.m., ESPN+		at Yale	W 83–75	9–17 (4–8)	John J. Lee Amphitheater (1,688); New Haven, CT
March 8, 2019; 7:00 p.m., SNY		Dartmouth	W 70–66	10–17 (5–8)	Levien Gymnasium (1,356); New York, NY
March 9, 2019; 7:00 p.m., SNY/ESPN+		Harvard	L 81–83 ^{OT}	10–18 (5–9)	Levien Gymnasium (2,314); New York, NY
*Non-conference game. ^{#}Rankings from AP poll. (#) Tournament seedings in parentheses. All times are in Eastern.

== See also ==
- 2018–19 Columbia Lions women's basketball team
