= 2018–19 Penn Quakers men's basketball team =

American college basketball season

2018–19 Penn Quakers men's basketball

Philadelphia Big 5 champions
- Conference: Ivy League
- Record: 19–12 (7–7 Ivy)
- Head coach: Steve Donahue (4th season)
- Assistant coaches: Nat Graham; Joe Mihalich; Trey Montgomery
- Home arena: The Palestra

2018–19 Ivy League men's basketball standings
	Conf.				Overall
Team	W		L	PCT	W		L	PCT
x-Harvard	10	–	4	.714	19	–	12	.613
x-Yale †	10	–	4	.714	22	–	8	.733
Princeton	8	–	6	.571	16	–	12	.571
Penn	7	–	7	.500	19	–	12	.613
Cornell	7	–	7	.500	15	–	16	.484
Brown	7	–	7	.500	20	–	12	.625
Columbia	5	–	9	.357	10	–	18	.357
Dartmouth	2	–	12	.143	11	–	19	.367
† 2019 Ivy League tournament winner x - Ivy League co-champions

The 2018–19 Penn Quakers men's basketball team represented the University of Pennsylvania in the 2018–19 NCAA Division I men's basketball season. They played their home games at The Palestra in Philadelphia, Pennsylvania and were led by fourth-year head coach Steve Donahue. The Quakers finished the season 19–12, 7–7 in Ivy League play to finish in a three-way tie for fourth place. As the No. 4 seed in the Ivy League tournament, they lost in the semifinals to Harvard.

== Previous season ==
The Quakers finished the 2017–18 season 24–9, 12–2 in Ivy League play to win a share of the Ivy League regular season championship with Harvard. In the Ivy League tournament, they defeated Yale and Harvard to become Ivy League Tournament champions. They received the Ivy League's automatic bid to the NCAA tournament where they lost in the first round to Kansas.

== Roster ==
2018–19 Penn Quakers men's basketball team
Players
Coaches

Pos.	#	Name	Height	Weight	Year	Previous school	Hometown
F	0	Max Rothschild	6 ft 8 in (2.03 m)	225 lb (102 kg)	Sr	New Hampton School	Chicago, IL
G	1	Ray Jerome	6 ft 2 in (1.88 m)	190 lb (86 kg)	Jr	Cheshire Academy	Latham, NY
G	2	Antonio Woods	6 ft 1 in (1.85 m)	200 lb (91 kg)	Sr	Summit Country Day School	Cincinnati, OH
G	3	Jake Silpe	6 ft 2 in (1.88 m)	190 lb (86 kg)	Sr	Cherry Hill East HS	Cherry Hill, NJ
G	4	Jelani Williams	6 ft 5 in (1.96 m)	195 lb (88 kg)	So	Sidwell Friends School	Washington, D.C.
G	5	Jackson Donahue	6 ft 0 in (1.83 m)	180 lb (82 kg)	Sr	Northfield Mount Hermon School	Pawcatuck, CT
G	10	Alex Imegwu	6 ft 6 in (1.98 m)	210 lb (95 kg)	Fr	Seton Hall Prep	Short Hills, NJ
G	11	Tyler Hamilton	6 ft 4 in (1.93 m)	205 lb (93 kg)	Sr	Cheshire Academy	Atlanta, GA
G	12	Devon Goodman	6 ft 0 in (1.83 m)	165 lb (75 kg)	Jr	Germantown Academy	Laverock, PA
G	13	Eddie Scott	6 ft 6 in (1.98 m)	195 lb (88 kg)	So	Gonzaga College HS	Bowie, MD
F	15	Zack Kaminsky	6 ft 6 in (1.98 m)	200 lb (91 kg)	Jr	Pace Academy	Atlanta, GA
G	20	Bryce Washington	6 ft 4 in (1.93 m)	180 lb (82 kg)	Fr	Southfield Christian School	Southfield, MI
G	21	Ryan Betley	6 ft 5 in (1.96 m)	195 lb (88 kg)	Jr	Downingtown West HS	Downingtown, PA
F	22	Jakub Mijakowski	6 ft 7 in (2.01 m)	230 lb (104 kg)	Jr	Mountain Mission School	Warsaw, Poland
F	23	Michael Wang	6 ft 10 in (2.08 m)	215 lb (98 kg)	Fr	Mater Dei HS	Taiyuan, China
F	24	Jarrod Simmons	6 ft 8 in (2.03 m)	220 lb (100 kg)	So	Moon Area HS	Crescent, PA
F	25	A. J. Brodeur	6 ft 8 in (2.03 m)	230 lb (104 kg)	Jr	Northfield Mount Hermon School	Northborough, MA
G	34	Griffin Ryan	6 ft 5 in (1.96 m)	210 lb (95 kg)	Fr	New Trier HS	Winnetka, IL
C	35	Mark Jackson	7 ft 3 in (2.21 m)	265 lb (120 kg)	So	Salt Lake City East HS	Salt Lake City, UT
C	44	Collin McManus	6 ft 10 in (2.08 m)	240 lb (109 kg)	Sr	Northfield Mount Hermon School	Bedford, NH

Head coach

- Steve Donahue (Ursinus)

Assistant coach(es)

- Nat Graham (Penn)
- Joe Mihalich (Nazareth)
- Trey Montgomery (Samford)

Legend

- (C) Team captain
- (S) Suspended
- (I) Ineligible
- (W) Walk-on
- Injured
- Current redshirt

Roster
Last update: December 10, 2018

== Schedule and results ==
Date time, TV	Rank^{#}	Opponent^{#}	Result	Record	Site (attendance) city, state
Regular season
November 6, 2018*; 7:00 pm, ESPN+		at George Mason	W 72–71	1–0	EagleBank Arena (5,767); Fairfax, VA
November 9, 2018*; 8:00 pm, ESPN+		Rice	W 92–76	2–0	The Palestra (2,256); Philadelphia, PA
November 13, 2018*; 7:00 pm, ESPN+		Lafayette	W 91–61	3–0	The Palestra (2,062); Philadelphia, PA
November 16, 2018*; 5:30 pm, Flohoops.com		vs. Northern Iowa; Paradise Jam quarterfinals	W 78–71	4–0	Sports and Fitness Center (2,162); St. Thomas, Virgin Islands
November 17, 2018*; 7:30 pm, Flohoops.com		vs. No. 12 Kansas State; Paradise Jam semifinals	L 48–64	4–1	Sports and Fitness Center (2,460); St. Thomas, Virgin Islands
November 19, 2018*; 5:30 pm, Flohoops.com		vs. Oregon State; Paradise Jam 3rd place game	L 58–74	4–2	Sports and Fitness Center (2,274); St. Thomas, Virgin Islands
November 24, 2018*; 2:00 pm, ESPN+		Stockton	W 112–63	5–2	The Palestra (2,268); Philadelphia, PA
November 27, 2018*; 7:30 pm		at Delaware State	W 76–48	6–2	Memorial Hall (757); Dover, DE
December 4, 2018*; 7:00 pm, ESPN+		Miami	W 89–75	7–2	The Palestra (3,019); Philadelphia, PA
December 8, 2018*; 4:00 pm, ESPN+		at La Salle; Philadelphia Big 5	W 83–65	8–2	Tom Gola Arena (1,203); Philadelphia, PA
December 11, 2018*; 7:00 pm, ESPN2		No. 17 Villanova; Philadelphia Big 5	W 78–75	9–2	The Palestra (8,033); Philadelphia, PA
December 22, 2018*; 4:00 pm, MWN		at New Mexico	W 75–65	10–2	Dreamstyle Arena (10,874); Albuequerque, NM
December 29, 2018*; 2:00 pm, ESPN+		at Toledo	L 45–77	10–3	Savage Arena (4,786); Toledo, OH
December 31, 2018*; 1:00 pm, ESPN+		Monmouth	L 74–76 ^{OT}	10–4	The Palestra (2,364); Philadelphia, PA
January 5, 2019; 5:00 pm, ESPN+		at Princeton	L 65–68	10–5 (0–1)	Jadwin Gymnasium (4,212); Princeton, NJ
January 12, 2019; 2:00 pm, ESPN+		Princeton	L 53–62	10–6 (0–2)	The Palestra (6,179); Philadelphia, PA
January 19, 2019*; 7:00 pm, CBSSN		at Temple; Philadelphia Big 5	W 77-70	11-6	Liacouras Center (8,409); Philadelphia, PA
January 26, 2019*; 4:30 pm, ESPN+		Saint Joseph's; Philadelphia Big 5	W 78–70	12–6	The Palestra (8,173); Philadelphia, PA
February 1, 2019; 5:00 pm, ESPNU		at Cornell	L 71–80	0–3 (12–7)	Newman Arena (1,741); Ithaca, NY
February 2, 2019; 7:00 pm, ESPN+		at Columbia	W 72–70	13–7 (1–3)	Levien Gymnasium (2,409); New York City, NY
February 8, 2019; 7:00 pm, ESPN+		at Brown	W 92–82	14–7 (2–3)	Pizzitola Sports Center (1,641); Providence, RI
February 9, 2019; 7:00 pm, ESPN+		at Yale	L 65–78	14–8 (2–4)	John J. Lee Amphitheater (2,185); New Haven, CT
February 15, 2019; 7:00 pm, ESPN+		Dartmouth	W 82–79 ^{OT}	15–8 (3–4)	The Palestra (2,170); Philadelphia, PA
February 16, 2019; 7:00 pm, ESPN+		Harvard	L 68–75 ^{OT}	15–9 (3–5)	The Palestra (5,662); Philadelphia, PA
February 22, 2019; 8:00 pm, ESPN+		Columbia	L 77–79 ^{OT}	15–10 (3–6)	The Palestra (2,906); Philadelphia, PA
February 23, 2019; 7:00 pm, ESPN+		Cornell	W 68–50	16–10 (4–6)	The Palestra (4,298); Philadelphia, PA
March 1, 2019; 7:00 pm, ESPNU		at Harvard	L 53–59	16–11 (4–7)	Lavietes Pavilion (1,636); Boston, MA
March 2, 2019; 7:00 pm, ESPN+		at Dartmouth	W 65–51	17–11 (5–7)	Leede Arena (960); Hanover, NH
March 8, 2019; 7:00 pm, ESPN+		Yale	W 77–66	18–11 (6–7)	The Palestra (2,968); Philadelphia, PA
March 9, 2019; 6:00 pm, ESPN+		Brown	W 58–51	19–11 (7–7)	The Palestra (4,033); Philadelphia, PA
Ivy League tournament
March 16, 2019; 12:30 pm, ESPNU		Harvard	L 58–66	19–12	John J. Lee Amphitheater (2,532); New Haven, CT
*Non-conference game. ^{#}Rankings from AP Poll. (#) Tournament seedings in parentheses. All times are in Eastern.
