= 2018–19 Brown Bears men's basketball team =

American college basketball season

2018–19 Brown Bears men's basketball

CBI, Quarterfinals
- Conference: Ivy League
- Record: 20–12 (7–7 Ivy)
- Head coach: Mike Martin (7th season)
- Associate head coach: T. J. Sorrentine
- Assistant coaches: Tyler Simms; Antone Gray
- Home arena: Pizzitola Sports Center

2018–19 Ivy League men's basketball standings
	Conf.				Overall
Team	W		L	PCT	W		L	PCT
x-Harvard	10	–	4	.714	19	–	12	.613
x-Yale †	10	–	4	.714	22	–	8	.733
Princeton	8	–	6	.571	16	–	12	.571
Penn	7	–	7	.500	19	–	12	.613
Cornell	7	–	7	.500	15	–	16	.484
Brown	7	–	7	.500	20	–	12	.625
Columbia	5	–	9	.357	10	–	18	.357
Dartmouth	2	–	12	.143	11	–	19	.367
† 2019 Ivy League tournament winner x - Ivy League co-champions

The 2018–19 Brown Bears men's basketball team represented Brown University during the 2018–19 NCAA Division I men's basketball season. The Bears, led by seventh-year head coach Mike Martin, played their home games at the Pizzitola Sports Center in Providence, Rhode Island as members of the Ivy League. They finished the season 20-12, 7-7 in Ivy League Play to finish a 3-way tie for 4th place. They failed to qualify for the Ivy League tournament. They received an at-large bid to the College Basketball Invitational where they defeated UAB in the first round before losing in the quarterfinals to Loyola Marymount.

== Previous season ==
The Bears finished the 2017–18 season 11–16, 4–10 in Ivy League play to finish in second-to-last place. They failed to qualify for the Ivy League tournament.

== Roster ==
2018–19 Brown Bears men's basketball team
Players
Coaches

Pos.	#	Name	Height	Weight	Year	Previous school	Hometown
G	0	David Mitchell	6 ft 6 in (1.98 m)	200 lb (91 kg)	Fr	Belmont Hill School	Roxbury, MA
F	1	Travis Fuller	6 ft 9 in (2.06 m)	225 lb (102 kg)	Sr	La Costa Canyon HS	Encinitas, CA
G	2	Brandon Anderson	6 ft 1 in (1.85 m)	170 lb (77 kg)	Jr	Don Bosco Prep	Mahwah, NJ
G	3	George Mawanda-Kalema	6 ft 3 in (1.91 m)	180 lb (82 kg)	So	Episcopal HS	Burke, VA
G	4	Obi Okolie	6 ft 5 in (1.96 m)	205 lb (93 kg)	Sr	Archbishop Denis O'Connor HS	Ajax, Ontario
F	5	Joshua Howard	6 ft 6 in (1.98 m)	205 lb (93 kg)	Jr	Providence Day School	Charlotte, NC
F	10	Davis Franks	6 ft 8 in (2.03 m)	205 lb (93 kg)	Fr	Northfield Mt. Hermon	New York, NY
G	11	Chris Sullivan	6 ft 3 in (1.91 m)	180 lb (82 kg)	Sr	Northfield Mt. Hermon	Wilmette, IL
G	12	Thomas Shaughnessy	6 ft 0 in (1.83 m)	170 lb (77 kg)	Fr	Needham HS	Needham, MA
G	15	Jake Shaper	6 ft 3 in (1.91 m)	195 lb (88 kg)	So	The Kinkaid School	Houston, TX
G	20	Zach Hunsaker	6 ft 2 in (1.88 m)	185 lb (84 kg)	Jr	Orem HS	North Salt Lake, UT
F	22	Jaylan Gainey	6 ft 9 in (2.06 m)	190 lb (86 kg)	Fr	The Academy at Smith	Greensboro, NC
G	24	Desmond Cambridge	6 ft 4 in (1.93 m)	180 lb (82 kg)	So	The Hun School	Nashville, TN
F	25	Tamenang Choh	6 ft 5 in (1.96 m)	210 lb (95 kg)	So	Brooks School	Lowell, MA
F	44	Matt DeWolf	6 ft 9 in (2.06 m)	230 lb (104 kg)	So	Northfield Mt. Hermon	Barrington, RI

Head coach

- Mike Martin (Brown)

Assistant coach(es)

- T. J. Sorrentine (Vermont)
- Tyler Simms (Trinity (CT))
- Antone Gray (Rhode Island College)

Legend

- (C) Team captain
- (S) Suspended
- (I) Ineligible
- (W) Walk-on
- Injured
- Current redshirt

Roster
Last update: December 7, 2018

== Schedule and results ==
Date time, TV	Opponent	Result	Record	Site (attendance) city, state
Non-conference regular season
November 9, 2018*; 7:30 pm	at LIU Brooklyn	L 81–83	0–1	Steinberg Wellness Center (452); Brooklyn, NY
November 11, 2018*; 2:00 pm	at NJIT	L 60–63	0–2	Wellness and Events Center (399); Newark, NJ
November 16, 2018*; 7:30 pm, ESPN+	UMass Lowell	W 82–74	1–2	Pizzitola Sports Center (1,131); Providence, RI
November 17, 2018*; 6:00 pm, ESPN+	Sacred Heart	W 82–77	2–2	Pizzitola Sports Center (863); Providence, RI
November 18, 2018*; 4:00 pm, ESPN+	Army	W 86–66	3–2	Pizzitola Sports Center (946); Providence, RI
November 21, 2018*; 3:00 pm, ESPN+	Salve Regina	W 96–64	4–2	Pizzitola Sports Center (814); Providence, RI
November 25, 2018*; 6:00 pm, ESPN+	Bryant	W 84–60	5–2	Pizzitola Sports Center (927); Providence, RI
November 28, 2018*; 7:00 pm, ESPN+	at Rhode Island	L 51–71	5–3	Ryan Center (4,828); Kingston, RI
December 1, 2018*; 4:00 pm	at Navy	W 67–50	6–3	Alumni Hall (671); Annapolis, MD
December 5, 2018*; 7:00 pm, FSN	at Butler	L 55–70	6–4	Hinkle Fieldhouse (7,361); Indianapolis, IN
December 8, 2018*; 2:00 pm, ESPN+	Stony Brook	W 71–69	7–4	Pizzitola Sports Center (1,137); Providence, RI
December 22, 2018*; 1:00 pm	at Marist	W 78–53	8–4	McCann Arena (1,185); Poughkeepsie, NY
December 29, 2018*; 8:00 pm, FSSD	at San Diego State	W 82–61	9–4	Viejas Arena (10,821); San Diego, CA
January 2, 2019*; 7:00 pm	Maine	W 75–67	10–4	Pizzitola Sports Center (676); Providence, RI
January 8, 2019*; 7:00 pm	at Canisius	W 97–90 ^{OT}	11–4	Koessler Athletic Center (801); Buffalo, NY
January 14, 2019*; 7:00 pm	Johnson & Wales–Providence	W 100–51	12–4	Pizzitola Sports Center (621); Providence, RI
Ivy League regular season
January 19, 2019; 3:30 pm, NESN	Yale	L 67–70	12–5 (0–1)	Pizzitola Sports Center (1,363); Providence, RI
January 25, 2019; 7:00 pm, ESPN+	at Yale	L 71–79	12–6 (0–2)	John J. Lee Amphitheater (2,094); New Haven, CT
February 1, 2019; 7:00 pm, ESPN+	at Dartmouth	W 60–58	13–6 (1–2)	Leede Arena (692); Hanover, NH
February 2, 2019; 7:00 pm, ESPN+	at Harvard	L 47–68	13–7 (1–3)	Lavietes Pavilion (1,636); Boston, MA
February 8, 2019; 7:00 pm, ESPN+	Penn	L 82–92	13–8 (1–4)	Pizzitola Sports Center (1,641); Providence, RI
February 9, 2019; 6:00 pm, ESPN+	Princeton	W 78–70	14–8 (2–4)	Pizzitola Sports Center (1,724); Providence, RI
February 15, 2019; 7:00 pm, ESPN+	at Cornell	L 66–70 ^{OT}	14–9 (2–5)	Newman Arena (2,966); Ithaca, NY
February 16, 2019; 7:00 pm, ESPN+	at Columbia	W 65–63	15–9 (3–5)	Levien Gymnasium (1,652); New York, NY
February 22, 2019; 7:00 pm, ESPN+	Harvard	W 88–79	16–9 (4–5)	Pizzitola Sports Center (2,208); Providence, RI
February 23, 2019; 6:00 pm, ESPN+	Dartmouth	W 68–65	17–9 (5–5)	Pizzitola Sports Center (1,265); Providence, RI
March 1, 2019; 5:00 pm, ESPNU	Columbia	L 77–80	17–10 (5–6)	Pizzitola Sports Center (2,015); Providence, RI
March 2, 2019; 6:00 pm, ESPN+	Cornell	W 75–51	18–10 (6–6)	Pizzitola Sports Center (1,574); Providence, RI
March 8, 2019; 7:00 pm, ESPNU	at Princeton	W 67–63	19–10 (7–6)	Jadwin Gymnasium (1,482); Princeton, NJ
March 9, 2019; 6:00 pm, ESPN+	at Penn	L 51–58	19–11 (7–7)	The Palestra (4,033); Philadelphia, PA
College Basketball Invitational
March 20, 2019*; 7:00 pm, ESPN+	UAB; First round	W 83–78	20–11	Pizzitola Sports Center (683); Providence, RI
March 25, 2019*; 9:00 pm, TheW.tv	at Loyola Marymount; Quarterfinals	L 63–81	20–12	Gersten Pavilion (657); Los Angeles, CA
*Non-conference game. ^{#}Rankings from AP Poll. (#) Tournament seedings in parentheses. All times are in Eastern Time.
