= 2018–19 Dartmouth Big Green men's basketball team =

American college basketball season

2018–19 Dartmouth Big Green men's basketball
- Conference: Ivy League
- Record: 11–19 (2–12 Ivy)
- Head coach: David McLaughlin (3rd season)
- Assistant coaches: Pete Hutchins; Justin Bradley; John Andrzejek
- Home arena: Leede Arena

2018–19 Ivy League men's basketball standings
	Conf.				Overall
Team	W		L	PCT	W		L	PCT
x-Harvard	10	–	4	.714	19	–	12	.613
x-Yale †	10	–	4	.714	22	–	8	.733
Princeton	8	–	6	.571	16	–	12	.571
Penn	7	–	7	.500	19	–	12	.613
Cornell	7	–	7	.500	15	–	16	.484
Brown	7	–	7	.500	20	–	12	.625
Columbia	5	–	9	.357	10	–	18	.357
Dartmouth	2	–	12	.143	11	–	19	.367
† 2019 Ivy League tournament winner x - Ivy League co-champions

The 2018–19 Dartmouth Big Green men's basketball team represented Dartmouth College during the 2018–19 NCAA Division I men's basketball season. They played their home games at the Leede Arena in Hanover, New Hampshire and were led by third-year head coach David McLaughlin as members of the Ivy League. They finished the season 11–19 overall, 2–12 in Ivy League play, finishing in eighth place, and failed to qualify for the Ivy League tournament.

== Previous season ==
The Big Green finished the 2017–18 season 7–20, 3–11 in Ivy League play to finish in last place and failed to qualify for the Ivy League tournament.

== Roster ==
2018–19 Dartmouth Big Green men's basketball team
Players
Coaches

Pos.	#	Name	Height	Weight	Year	Previous school	Hometown
F	0	Will Emery	6 ft 9 in (2.06 m)	220 lb (100 kg)	Jr	St. Ignatius College Prep	San Francisco, CA
G	1	Taurus Samuels	6 ft 0 in (1.83 m)	175 lb (79 kg)	Fr	Vista HS	Oceanside, CA
G	2	Isaac Letoa	6 ft 1 in (1.85 m)	180 lb (82 kg)	So	Westlake Boys HS	Auckland, New Zealand
F	3	Ian Carter	6 ft 7 in (2.01 m)	220 lb (100 kg)	Jr	La Mirada HS	Los Angeles, CA
G	4	Trevon Ary-Turner	6 ft 3 in (1.91 m)	185 lb (84 kg)	So	Elite Prep	Issaquah, WA
G	5	Ian Sistare	6 ft 3 in (1.91 m)	200 lb (91 kg)	Jr	Northfield Mount Hermon School	Dublin, NH
G	10	James Foye	6 ft 4 in (1.93 m)	195 lb (88 kg)	Jr	Phillips Exeter Academy	Hamilton, MA
G	11	Wes Slajchert	6 ft 5 in (1.96 m)	185 lb (84 kg)	Fr	Oak Park HS	Oak Park, CA
G	14	Guilien Smith	6 ft 2 in (1.88 m)	205 lb (93 kg)	Sr	Catholic Memorial School	Boston, MA
G	15	Brendan Barry	6 ft 2 in (1.88 m)	180 lb (82 kg)	Jr	Rumson-Fair Haven Regional HS	Fair Haven, NJ
G	20	Ben Swett	6 ft 1 in (1.85 m)	175 lb (79 kg)	So	Phillips Exeter Academy	Exeter, NH
G/F	21	Aaryn Rai	6 ft 6 in (1.98 m)	205 lb (93 kg)	So	Orangeville Prep	Markham, Ontario
F	22	Garrison Wade	6 ft 6 in (1.98 m)	200 lb (91 kg)	Fr	St. Andrew's Episcopal School	Madison, MS
F	23	Chris Knight	6 ft 7 in (2.01 m)	225 lb (102 kg)	So	James Madison Memorial HS	Madison, WI
F	33	Adrease Jackson	6 ft 8 in (2.03 m)	225 lb (102 kg)	So	Santa Margarita Catholic HS	Santa Margarita, CA

Head coach

- David McLaughlin (Colby)

Assistant coach(es)

- Pete Hutchins (Plymouth State)
- Justin Bradley (Guilford)
- John Andrzejek (Columbia)

Legend

- (C) Team captain
- (S) Suspended
- (I) Ineligible
- (W) Walk-on
- Injured
- Current redshirt

Roster
Last update: December 13, 2018

== Schedule and results ==
Date time, TV	Rank^{#}	Opponent^{#}	Result	Record	Site (attendance) city, state
Non-conference regular season
November 6, 2018*; 7:00 pm		Newbury	W 114–39	1–0	Leede Arena (492); Hanover, NH
November 9, 2018*; 7:00 pm		at Davidson	L 76–79	1–1	John M. Belk Arena (3,521); Davidson, NC
November 11, 2018*; 5:00 pm		at Loyola (MD)	W 82–80	2–1	Reitz Arena (1,114); Baltimore, MD
November 13, 2018*; 7:00 pm		Elms	W 100–54	3–1	Leede Arena (419); Hanover, NH
November 21, 2018*; 7:00 pm		at No. 22 Buffalo; Basketball Hall of Fame Belfast Classic campus game	L 71–110	3–2	Alumni Arena (3,573); Amherst, New York
November 24, 2018*; 5:00 pm		at San Francisco; Basketball Hall of Fame Belfast Classic campus game	L 65–84	3–3	War Memorial Gymnasium (2,017); San Francisco, California
November 29, 2018*; 11:30 am, CBSSN		vs. Marist; Basketball Hall of Fame Belfast Classic semifinals	L 58–76	3–4	SSE Arena (3,166); Belfast, Northern Ireland
November 30, 2018*; 12:00 pm, CBSSN		vs. Albany; Basketball Hall of Fame Belfast Classic 3rd place game	W 91–77	4–4	SSE Arena (6,460); Belfast, Northern Ireland
December 5, 2018*; 7:00 pm		Quinnipiac	L 59–64	4–5	Leede Arena (437); Hanover, NH
December 8, 2018*; 2:00 pm		Maine	W 78–52	5–5	Leede Arena (636); Hanover, NH
December 10, 2018*; 12:00 pm		Sacred Heart	W 82–73	6–5	Leede Arena (1,718); Hanover, NH
December 13, 2018*; 7:00 pm, NESN		Boston University	W 78–68	7–5	Leede Arena (420); Hanover, NH
December 15, 2018*; 2:00 pm		at Albany	W 61–52	8–5	SEFCU Arena (1,740); Albany, NY
December 21, 2018*; 11:00 am		at Bryant	L 67–68	8–6	Chace Athletic Center (674); Smithfield, RI
December 30, 2018*; 12:00 pm, NESN		New Hampshire	W 76–68	9–6	Leede Arena (963); Hanover, NH
January 2, 2019*; 7:00 pm		at Vermont	L 59–73	9–7	Patrick Gym (2,542); Burlington, VT
Ivy League regular season
January 12, 2019; 7:00 pm, NESNPlus		Harvard	W 81–63	10–7 (1–0)	Leede Arena (1,452); Hanover, New Hampshire
January 26, 2019; 2:00 pm, NESN		at Harvard	L 59–64	10–8 (1–1)	Lavietes Pavilion (1,636); Cambridge, MA
February 1, 2019; 7:00 pm, ESPN+		Brown	L 58–60	10–9 (1–2)	Leede Arena (692); Hanover, NH
February 2, 2019; 7:00 pm, ESPN+		Yale	L 68-89	10-10 (1-3)	Leede Arena (989); Hanover, NH
February 8, 2019; 7:00 pm, ESPN+		Cornell	L 80-83	10-11 (1-4)	Leede Arena (601); Hanover, NH
February 9, 2019; 7:00 pm, ESPN+		Columbia	W 82-66	11-11 (2-4)	Leede Arena (1,021); Hanover, NH
February 15, 2019; 7:00 pm, ESPN+		at Penn	L 79-82 ^{OT}	11-12 (2-5)	The Palestra (2,170); Philadelphia, PA
February 16, 2019; 7:00 pm, ESPN+		at Princeton	L 68-69	11-13 (2-6)	Jadwin Gymnasium (2,322); Princeton, NJ
February 22, 2019; 7:00 pm, ESPNews		at Yale	L 59-77	11-14 (2-7)	John J. Lee Amphitheater (1,241); New Haven, CT
February 23, 2019; 6:00 pm, ESPN+		at Brown	L 65-68	11-15 (2-8)	Pizzitola Sports Center (1,265); Providence, RI
March 1, 2019; 7:00 pm, ESPN+		Princeton	L 76-77 ^{OT}	11-16 (2-9)	Leede Arena (781); Hanover, NH
March 2, 2019; 7:00 pm, ESPN+		Penn	L 51-65	11-17 (2-10)	Leede Arena (960); Hanover, NH
March 8, 2019; 7:00 pm, SNY		at Columbia	L 66-70	11-18 (2-11)	Levien Gymnasium (1,356); New York City, NY
March 9, 2019; 7:00 pm, ESPN+		at Cornell	L 51–66	11–19 (2–12)	Newman Arena (1,862); Ithaca, NY
*Non-conference game. ^{#}Rankings from AP Poll. (#) Tournament seedings in parentheses. All times are in Eastern.
