= 2018–19 Princeton Tigers men's basketball team =

American college basketball season

2018–19 Princeton Tigers men's basketball
- Conference: Ivy League
- Record: 16–12 (8–6 Ivy)
- Head coach: Mitch Henderson (8th season)
- Assistant coaches: Brett MacConnell; Skye Ettin; Jonathan Jones
- Home arena: Jadwin Gymnasium

2018–19 Ivy League men's basketball standings
	Conf.				Overall
Team	W		L	PCT	W		L	PCT
x-Harvard	10	–	4	.714	19	–	12	.613
x-Yale †	10	–	4	.714	22	–	8	.733
Princeton	8	–	6	.571	16	–	12	.571
Penn	7	–	7	.500	19	–	12	.613
Cornell	7	–	7	.500	15	–	16	.484
Brown	7	–	7	.500	20	–	12	.625
Columbia	5	–	9	.357	10	–	18	.357
Dartmouth	2	–	12	.143	11	–	19	.367
† 2019 Ivy League tournament winner x - Ivy League co-champions

The 2018–19 Princeton Tigers men's basketball team represented Princeton University during the 2018–19 NCAA Division I men's basketball season. The Tigers, led by eighth-year head coach Mitch Henderson, played their home games at Jadwin Gymnasium as members of the Ivy League.

== Previous season ==
The Tigers finished the 2017–18 season with a record of 13–16 (5–9 in Ivy League play), which tied for fifth place with the Columbia Lions. They failed to qualify for the Ivy League tournament.

== Offseason ==
=== Departures ===
Name	Number	Pos.	Height	Weight	Year	Hometown	Reason for departure
Aaron Young	0	G	6'0"	180	Senior	Falls Church, VA	Graduated
Mike LeBlanc	4	F	6'6"	195	Senior	Dover, DE	Graduated
Amir Bell	5	G	6'3"	190	Senior	East Brunswick, NJ	Graduated
Alec Brennan	35	F	6'11"	230	Senior	Weston, MA	Graduated

== Roster ==
2018–19 Princeton Tigers men's basketball team
Players
Coaches

Pos.	#	Name	Height	Weight	Year	Previous school	Hometown
G	0	Jaelin Llewellyn	6 ft 2 in (1.88 m)	175 lb (79 kg)	Fr	Virginia Episcopal School	Mississauga
F	1	Vittorio Reynoso-Avila	6 ft 5 in (1.96 m)	200 lb (91 kg)	Jr	La Mirada	La Mirada, CA
G	2	Jose Morales	5 ft 9 in (1.75 m)	170 lb (77 kg)	Jr	Hun School	Miramar, FL
G	3	Devin Cannady	6 ft 1 in (1.85 m)	182 lb (83 kg)	Sr	Marian	Mishawaka, IN
G	4	Max Johns	6 ft 3 in (1.91 m)	195 lb (88 kg)	Fr	Woodberry Forest School	High Point, NC
F	5	Drew Friberg	6 ft 6 in (1.98 m)	210 lb (95 kg)	Fr	State College	State College, PA
G	10	Charlie Bagin	6 ft 1 in (1.85 m)	170 lb (77 kg)	So	Don Bosco	Glen Ridge, NJ
G	11	Elias Berbari	6 ft 2 in (1.88 m)	185 lb (84 kg)	Sr	Harborfields	Greenlawn, NY
G	12	Myles Stephens	6 ft 5 in (1.96 m)	210 lb (95 kg)	Sr	St. Andrew's	Lawrenceville, NJ
F	13	Will Gladson	6 ft 10 in (2.08 m)	240 lb (109 kg)	Jr	Chaminade College Prep	Chesterfield, MO
G	14	Ethan Wright	6 ft 3 in (1.91 m)	180 lb (82 kg)	Fr	Newton North	Newton Center, MA
G	15	Ryan Schwieger	6 ft 6 in (1.98 m)	205 lb (93 kg)	So	Weddington	Matthews, NC
F	22	Jerome Desrosiers	6 ft 7 in (2.01 m)	230 lb (104 kg)	So	Northfield Mount Hermon	Saint-Hyacinthe, QC
F	23	Elijah Barnes	6 ft 7 in (2.01 m)	215 lb (98 kg)	So	Mater Dei	Middletown, NJ
F	31	Noah Bramlage	6 ft 8 in (2.03 m)	220 lb (100 kg)	Sr	Ottawa-Glandorf	Glandorf, OH
F	33	Sebastian Much	6 ft 8 in (2.03 m)	220 lb (100 kg)	So	JSerra Catholic	Laguna Niguel, CA
C	34	Richmond Aririguzoh	6 ft 9 in (2.06 m)	230 lb (104 kg)	Jr	Trenton Catholic	Ewing, NJ
F	35	Colby Kyle	6 ft 8 in (2.03 m)	190 lb (86 kg)	Fr	Monroe	Monroe, WA

Head coach

- Mitch Henderson (Princeton)

Assistant coach(es)

- Brett MacConnell (Rutgers)
- Skye Ettin (TCNJ)
- Jonathan Jones (Kean)

Legend

- (C) Team captain
- (S) Suspended
- (I) Ineligible
- (W) Walk-on
- Injured
- Current redshirt

Roster

== Schedule and results ==
On December 29, Princeton defeated number 17-ranked Arizona State after Richmond Aririguzoh made a pair of free throws with 24.8 seconds left to provide the final 67–66 margin of victory. It was Princeton's first win over a ranked opponent since defeating the 25-ranked 2011–12 Harvard Crimson on February 11, 2012, and the school's first win over a top-20 opponent since head coach Henderson was a player on the 1995–96 Princeton team that upset the UCLA Bruins in the 1996 NCAA Division I men's basketball tournament.

Date time, TV	Rank^{#}	Opponent^{#}	Result	Record	Site (attendance) city, state
Regular season
November 9, 2018*; 7:00 pm, ESPN+		DeSales	W 85–51	1–0	Jadwin Gymnasium (1,523); Princeton, NJ
November 16, 2018*; 8:30 pm		at Lehigh	L 57–72	1–1	Stabler Arena (1,171); Bethlehem, PA
November 21, 2018*; 7:00 pm, ESPN+		Fairleigh Dickinson	L 66–77	1–2	Jadwin Gymnasium (1,291); Princeton, NJ
November 24, 2018*; 3:00 pm, ESPN+		at Monmouth	W 60–57	2–2	OceanFirst Bank Center (2,050); West Long Branch, NJ
November 28, 2018*; 7:00 pm, ESPN+		at Maine	W 73–59	3–2	Cross Insurance Center (1,113); Bangor, ME
December 1, 2018*; 4:00 pm, ESPN+		George Washington	W 73–52	4–2	Jadwin Gymnasium (1,932); Princeton, NJ
December 5, 2018*; 7:00 pm, ESPN+		Saint Joseph's	L 82–92	4–3	Jadwin Gymnasium (1,668); Princeton, NJ
December 9, 2018*; 1:00 pm, FS1		at St. John's; MSG Holiday Festival	L 74–89	4–4	Madison Square Garden (10,078); New York City, NY
December 15, 2018*; 11:30 am		vs. Iona; Boardwalk Classic	W 85–81	5–4	Boardwalk Hall; Atlantic City, NJ
December 18, 2018*; 6:00 pm, ESPN2		at No. 2 Duke	L 50–101	5–5	Cameron Indoor Stadium (9,314); Durham, NC
December 21, 2018*; 7:00 pm		at LaFayette	W 81–79	6–5	Kirby Sports Center (1,134); Easton, PA
December 29, 2018; 4:00 pm, P12N		at No. 17 Arizona State	W 67–66	7–5	Wells Fargo Arena (10,030); Tempe, AZ
January 5, 2019; 5:00 pm, ESPN+		Penn	W 68–65	8–5 (1–0)	Jadwin Gymnasium (4,212); Princeton, NJ
January 12, 2019; 2:00 pm, ESPN+		at Penn	W 62–53	9–5 (2–0)	The Palestra (6,179); Philadelphia, PA
January 27, 2019*; 12:00 pm, ESPN+		Wesley	W 91–62	10–5	Jadwin Gymnasium (1,845); Princeton, NJ
February 1, 2019; 7:00 pm, ESPN+/SNY		at Columbia	W 55–43	11–5 (3–0)	Levien Gymnasium (1,932); New York City, NY
February 2, 2019; 7:30 pm, ESPN+		at Cornell	W 70–61	12–5 (4–0)	Newman Arena (1,807); Ithaca, NY
February 8, 2019; 7:00 pm, ESPN+		at Yale	L 60–74	12–6 (4–1)	Payne Whitney Gymnasium (1,767); New Haven, CT
February 9, 2019; 6:00 pm, ESPN+		at Brown	L 70–78	12–7 (4–2)	Pizzitola Sports Center (1,724); Providence, RI
February 15, 2019; 6:00 pm, ESPNews		Harvard	L 69–78	12–8 (4–3)	Jadwin Gymnasium (2,945); Princeton, NJ
February 16, 2019; 7:00 pm, ESPN+		Dartmouth	W 69–68	13–8 (5–3)	Jadwin Gymnasium (2,322); Princeton, NJ
February 22, 2019; 8:00 pm, ESPN+		Cornell	W 68–59	14–8 (6–3)	Jadwin Gymnasium (1,840); Princeton, NJ
February 23, 2019; 8:00 pm, ESPN+		Columbia	W 79–61	15–8 (7–3)	Jadwin Gymnasium (1,940); Princeton, NJ
March 1, 2019; 7:00 pm, ESPN+		at Dartmouth	W 77–76 ^{OT}	16–8 (8–3)	Leede Arena (781); Hanover, NH
March 2, 2019; 7:00 pm, ESPN+		at Harvard	L 58–66	16–9 (8–4)	Lavietes Pavilion (1,636); Cambridge, MA
March 8, 2019; 4:00 pm, ESPN+		Brown	L 63–67	16–10 (8–5)	Jadwin Gymnasium (1,482); Princeton, NJ
March 9, 2019; 6:00 pm, ESPN+/NBCSP+		Yale	L 59–81	16–11 (8–6)	Jadwin Gymnasium (2,794); Princeton, NJ
Ivy League tournament
March 16, 2019; 3:00 pm, ESPNU	(3)	(2) Yale	L 77–83	16–12	Payne Whitney Gymnasium; New Haven, CT
*Non-conference game. ^{#}Rankings from AP Poll. (#) Tournament seedings in parentheses. All times are in Eastern Time.
