= Basketball Hall of Fame Belfast Classic =

Sports tournament in Northern Ireland

- Sport: College basketball
- Founded: 2017
- No. of teams: 8
- Country: Northern Ireland
- Venues: SSE Arena; Belfast
- Most recent champions: Buffalo Bulls (Goliath); Marist Red Foxes (Samson)
- Broadcaster: CBS Sports Network
- Website: Belfast Basketball Classic.com

The Basketball Hall of Fame Belfast Classic is an eight team college basketball tournament held in November and December of the NCAA Division I men's basketball season, with the inaugural tournament beginning in 2017. It is currently the only college tournament played across the Atlantic, and the first-ever NCAA basketball games played in Europe. In its inaugural season, only four teams participated, but it was increased for the 2018–19 season to eight teams. In 2017, the four participants played all their games at the SSE Arena in Belfast, Northern Ireland, with the winners moving on to the championship game, and the losers playing in the consolation game. Towson was the inaugural champion, defeating Manhattan 56–55, and winning the game on a last second shot by Tigers senior guard Mike Morsell.

The format was changed in 2018, with the schools competing in two four-team brackets, with campus round games in America leading into two tournament brackets in Belfast named Samson and Goliath, which are named after the iconic Harland and Wolff cranes in the Titanic quarter ship yard of Belfast. The semifinals and championship games of each bracket are played in Northern Ireland, with each bracket winner declared champions of their respective brackets.

The tournament is sponsored by The Sport Changes Life Foundation, in partnership with the Naismith Memorial Basketball Hall of Fame and the Metro Atlantic Athletic Conference (MAAC).

== Brackets ==
* – Denotes overtime period

=== 2018 ===
==== Campus Games ====
Campus Game 1 November 18, 2018
Long Island	52
San Francisco	84

Campus Game 2 November 20, 2018; ESPN+
Marist	60
Stephen F. Austin	64

Campus Game 3 November 20, 2018
Long Island	87
Milwaukee	92*

Campus Game 4 November 21, 2018; ESPN+
	Dartmouth	71
22	Buffalo	110

Campus Game 5 November 23, 2018; ESPN+
Albany	70
Milwaukee	79

Campus Game 6 November 24, 2018; ESPN3
	Marist	49
22	Buffalo	76

Campus Game 7 November 24, 2018
Dartmouth	65
San Francisco	84

===== Goliath Bracket =====
Goliath Semifinals; November 30
Milwaukee	77
21	Buffalo	96
San Francisco	76
Stephen F. Austin	58

Goliath Championship; December 1
21	Buffalo	85
San Francisco	81

===== Samson Bracket =====
Samson Semifinals; November 29
Dartmouth	58
Marist	76
Long Island	80
Albany	77

Samson Championship; November 30
Marist	70
Long Island	53

=== 2017 ===
Semifinals; December 1, 2017; CBSSN
Holy Cross	54
Manhattan	70
La Salle	60
Towson	67

Championship; December 2, 2017; CBSSN
Manhattan	55
Towson	56
