= 2018–19 Marist Red Foxes men's basketball team =

American college basketball season

2018–19 Marist Red Foxes men's basketball
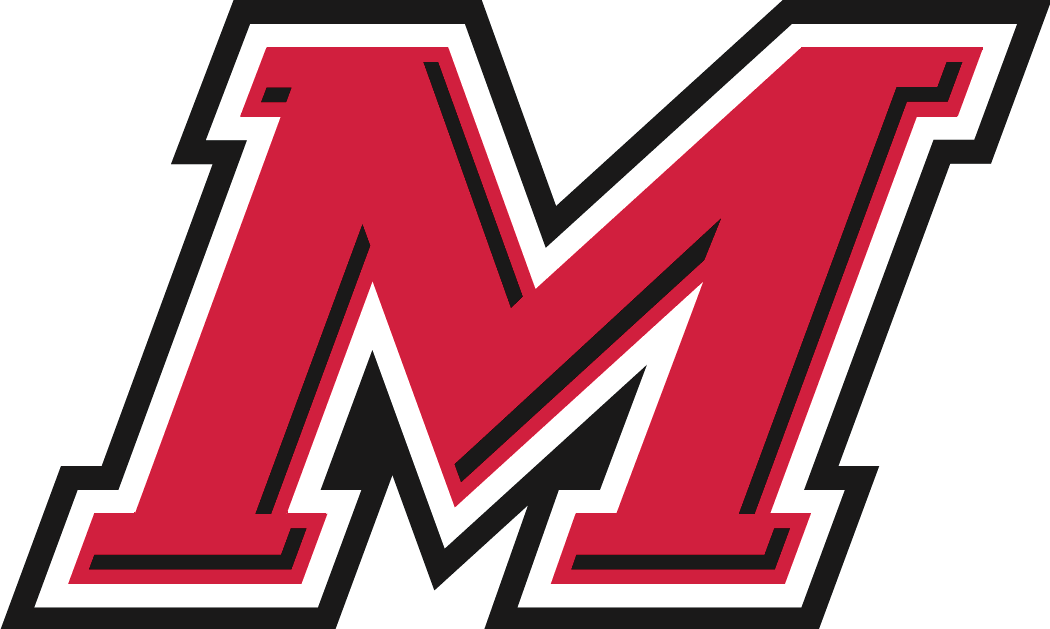

Basketball Hall of Fame Belfast Classic Samson champions
- Conference: Metro Atlantic Athletic Conference
- Record: 12–19 (7–11 MAAC)
- Head coach: John Dunne (1st season)
- Assistant coaches: Serge Clement; Kevin Driscoll; Dalip Bhatia
- Home arena: McCann Arena

2018–19 MAAC men's basketball standings
	Conf.				Overall
Team	W		L	PCT	W		L	PCT
Iona †	12	–	6	.667	17	–	16	.515
Canisius	11	–	7	.611	15	–	17	.469
Quinnipiac	11	–	7	.611	16	–	15	.516
Rider	11	–	7	.611	16	–	15	.516
Siena	11	–	7	.611	17	–	16	.515
Monmouth	10	–	8	.556	14	–	21	.400
Manhattan	8	–	10	.444	11	–	21	.344
Marist	7	–	11	.389	12	–	19	.387
Saint Peter's	6	–	12	.333	10	–	22	.313
Fairfield	6	–	12	.333	9	–	22	.290
Niagara	6	–	12	.333	13	–	19	.406
† 2019 MAAC tournament winner

The 2018–19 Marist Red Foxes men's basketball team represented Marist College in the 2018–19 NCAA Division I men's basketball season. The team played its home games in Poughkeepsie, New York for the 42nd consecutive year at the McCann Arena, which has a capacity of 3,200. This season marked the program's 38th Division I season and its 22nd consecutive year as a member of the Metro Atlantic Athletic Conference. The team was led by first-year head coach John Dunne, who took the open head coaching position after spending the last 12 seasons at conference rival Saint Peter's University. They finished the 2018–19 season 12–19 overall, 7–11 in MAAC play to finish in eighth place. As the No. 8 seed in the 2019 MAAC tournament, they were defeated by No. 9 seed Saint Peter's in the first round 68–71 in overtime.

== Previous season ==
The Red Foxes finished the 2017–18 season 6–25 overall, 4–14 in MAAC play to finish in a tie for tenth place. They lost in the first round of the MAAC tournament to Fairfield. On March 5, 2018, head coach Mike Maker was fired. He finished at Marist with a four-year record of 28–97. On April 3, 2018, Marist hired their 12th head coach in program history, when Saint Peter's head coach John Dunne was tabbed as Mike Maker's successor. Dunne left Saint Peter's with a record of 153–225 over the span of 12 seasons.

== Preseason ==
Marist entered the season having lost 20 or more games for the last four seasons under former head coach Mike Maker. The team returned all five of their starters from last season, which included Brian Parker, who was named Preseason Second Team All-MAAC. Parker entered the season as the 10th all-time leading scorer in school history, and led the team in scoring last season. Also returning was Ryan Funk, the team's long-distance threat, who came into his senior season having made 185 three-pointers in his career, which is sixth-highest in school history. Even with a new coach, and a completely new staff, MAAC coaches picked the Red Foxes to finish in sixth place in the preseason poll.

=== Departures ===
Name	Number	Pos.	Height	Weight	Year	Hometown	Reason for departure
Andrea Bernardi	0	G	6'4"	180	Freshman	Trento, Italy	No longer on team roster
Richie Mitchell	1	G	6'1"	175	Junior	Michigan City, IN	No longer on team roster
Kristinn Palsson	13	G/F	6'6"	200	Junior	Reykjanesbær, Iceland	Withdrew from school
Obi Momah	15	F	6'7"	250	Junior	Farmington, CT	Transferred to Norfolk State
Connor McClenaghan	33	C	6'9"	245	Senior	Carrollton, TX	Graduated
Lasse Gummerus	35	F	6'8"	210	Freshman	Espoo, Finland	Transferred to Sheridan College, WY

=== Incoming transfers ===
Name	Number	Pos.	Height	Weight	Year	Hometown	Previous school
Matt Turner	1	G	6'3"	175	Sophomore	Trumbull, CT	Santa Clara. Sitting out 2018–19 season. Will have three years of remaining eligibility.
Michael Cubbage	5	G	6'4"	180	Junior	Sicklerville, NJ	Paris Junior College. Sitting out 2018–19 season. Will have two years of remaining eligibility.
Jordan Jones	15	F	6'8"	205	Junior	Baltimore, MD	Charleston Southern. Sitting out 2018–19 season. Will have two years of remaining eligibility.

=== 2018 signing class ===
College recruiting information
Name	Hometown	School	Height	Weight	Commit date
Luke Nedrow; F	Pittsburgh, PA	Central Catholic	6 ft 7 in (2.01 m)	225 lb (102 kg)	Nov 8, 2017
Luke Nedrow; F	Recruit ratings: Scout: Rivals: 247Sports: (NR)				
Matthew Herasme; G/F	Chester, NY	Don Bosco Prep	6 ft 3 in (1.91 m)	180 lb (82 kg)	Apr 8, 2018
Matthew Herasme; G/F	Recruit ratings: Scout: Rivals: 247Sports: (NR)				
Darius Hines; PG	Clinton, MD	Bishop Ireton	5 ft 11 in (1.80 m)	160 lb (73 kg)	Apr 26, 2018
Darius Hines; PG	Recruit ratings: Scout: Rivals: 247Sports: (NR)				
Overall recruit ranking:
Note: In many cases, Scout, Rivals, 247Sports, On3, and ESPN may conflict in their listings of height and weight.; In these cases, the average was taken. ESPN grades are on a 100-point scale.; Sources: "2018 Team Ranking". Rivals.

== Roster ==
2018–19 Marist Red Foxes men's basketball team
Players
Coaches

Pos.	#	Name	Height	Weight	Year	Previous school	Hometown
G	0	Darius Hines	5 ft 11 in (1.8 m)	160 lb (73 kg)	Fr	Bishop Ireton	Clinton, MD
G	1	Matt Turner (redshirt)	6 ft 3 in (1.91 m)	175 lb (79 kg)	RS Fr	Blair Academy; Santa Clara	Trumbull, CT
G	2	Brian Parker	6 ft 3 in (1.91 m)	215 lb (98 kg)	Sr	Villa Angela-St. Joseph	Cleveland, OH
F	4	Isaiah Lamb	6 ft 4 in (1.93 m)	205 lb (93 kg)	Sr	Dulaney	Baltimore, MD
G	5	Michael Cubbage (redshirt)	6 ft 4 in (1.93 m)	180 lb (82 kg)	RS Jr	Winslow Township; Paris Junior College	Sicklerville, NJ
G	10	Ryan Carmello (W)	5 ft 11 in (1.8 m)	160 lb (73 kg)	So	Troy	Latham, NY
C	11	Tobias Sjoberg	6 ft 9 in (2.06 m)	250 lb (113 kg)	Jr	Malmö Idrottsgymnasium	Malmö, Sweden
G	13	Matt Herasme	6 ft 3 in (1.91 m)	180 lb (82 kg)	Fr	Don Bosco Prep	Chester, NY
F	14	Aleksandar Dozic	6 ft 9 in (2.06 m)	210 lb (95 kg)	RS Jr	Don Bosco Prep (IN); Marshall	Podgorica, Montenegro
F	15	Jordan Jones (redshirt)	6 ft 8 in (2.03 m)	205 lb (93 kg)	RS So	Poly High School; Charleston Southern	Baltimore, MD
F	21	Luke Nedrow	6 ft 7 in (2.01 m)	225 lb (102 kg)	Fr	Central Catholic	Pittsburgh, PA
G	22	Austin Williams	6 ft 3 in (1.91 m)	185 lb (84 kg)	So	Seton Hall Prep	West Orange, NJ
G	25	Tucker Lee (W)	6 ft 3 in (1.91 m)	180 lb (82 kg)	So	Spackenkill	Poughkeepsie, NY
F	30	Ryan Funk	6 ft 6 in (1.98 m)	190 lb (86 kg)	Sr	St. Thomas More Prep	Clarence, NY
G	32	Michael Servetas (W)	6 ft 2 in (1.88 m)	190 lb (86 kg)	So	Bridgeton Prep	Trumbull, CT
G/F	34	David Knudsen	6 ft 5 in (1.96 m)	205 lb (93 kg)	Sr	Falkonergardens	Copenhagen, Denmark

Head coach

- John Dunne (Ithaca)

Assistant coach(es)

- Serge Clement (SUNY Potsdam)
- Kevin Driscoll (Misericordia)
- Dalip Bhatia (Rutgers)

Legend

- (C) Team captain
- (S) Suspended
- (I) Ineligible
- (W) Walk-on
- Injured
- Current redshirt

Roster
Last update: February 10, 2019

== Schedule ==
Date time, TV	Rank^{#}	Opponent^{#}	Result	Record	High points	High rebounds	High assists	Site (attendance) city, state
Non-conference regular season
November 6, 2018*; 7:00 pm		at Army	L 69–73	0–1	25 – Parker	10 – Parker	3 – Parker	Christl Arena (573); West Point, New York
November 10, 2018*; 7:00 pm, ESPN3		Columbia	W 82–76	1–1	21 – Parker	6 – Parker	3 – Lamb	McCann Arena (1,413); Poughkeepsie, New York
November 13, 2018*; 7:00 pm		at Lehigh	L 72–78	1–2	17 – Parker	9 – Lamb	5 – Parker	Stabler Arena (681); Bethlehem, Pennsylvania
November 20, 2018*; 8:30 pm, ESPN+		at Stephen F. Austin; Basketball Hall of Fame Belfast Classic campus game	L 60–64	1–3	15 – Lamb	6 – Funk	5 – Hines	William R. Johnson Coliseum (2,804); Nacogdoches, Texas
November 24, 2018*; 2:00 pm, ESPN3		at No. 22 Buffalo; Basketball Hall Of Fame Belfast Classic campus game	L 49–76	1–4	10 – Williams	7 – Herasme	3 – Parker	Alumni Arena (4,589); Amherst, New York
November 29, 2018*; 11:30 am, CBSSN		vs. Dartmouth; Basketball Hall Of Fame Belfast Classic; Samson semifinals	W 76–58	2–4	18 – Parker	8 – Dozic	6 – Parker	SSE Arena (3,166); Belfast, Northern Ireland
November 30, 2018*; 2:30 pm, CBSSN		vs. LIU Brooklyn; Basketball Hall Of Fame Belfast Classic; Samson finals	W 70–53	3–4	15 – Parker	8 – Lamb	5 – Parker	SSE Arena (6,460); Belfast, Northern Ireland
December 8, 2018*; 1:00 pm, ESPN+		at Stetson	W 79–75	4–4	18 – Lamb	7 – Lamb	4 – Parker	Edmunds Center (388); DeLand, Florida
December 15, 2018*; 2:00 pm, Patriot League Network		at Colgate	L 66–82	4–5	18 – Parker	4 – Lamb	5 – Williams	Cotterell Court (433); Hamilton, New York
December 19, 2018*; 11:00 am, ESPN3		at New Hampshire	W 58–49	5–5	13 – Parker	7 – Nedrow	4 – Dozic	Lundholm Gym (577); Durham, New Hampshire
December 22, 2018*; 1:00 pm, ESPN+		Brown	L 53–78	5–6	16 – Dozic	7 – Dozic	6 – Parker	McCann Arena (1,185); Poughkeepsie, New York
December 29, 2018*; 2:00 pm, ESPN+		at Hartford	L 56–65	5–7	16 – Parker	6 – Lamb	3 – Parker	Chase Arena (802); West Hartford, Connecticut
MAAC Regular Season
January 3, 2019; 7:00 pm, ESPN+		Canisius	L 72–75	5–8 (0–1)	21 – Lamb	9 – Lamb	4 – Sjoberg	McCann Arena (1,022); Poughkeepsie, New York
January 8, 2019; 7:00 pm, ESPN+		Manhattan	W 78–63	6–8 (1–1)	17 – Parker	6 – Parker	4 – Parker	McCann Arena (985); Poughkeepsie, New York
January 11, 2019; 7:00 pm, ESPNU		Siena	L 66–71	6–9 (1–2)	13 – Lamb	8 – Lamb	6 – Parker	McCann Arena (1,678); Poughkeepsie, New York
January 13, 2019; 1:00 pm		at Saint Peter's	L 63–72	6–10 (1–3)	17 – Parker	4 – Sjoberg	3 – Parker	Yanitelli Center (713); Jersey City, New Jersey
January 18, 2019; 7:00 pm, ESPN+		at Iona	L 77–90	6–11 (1–4)	21 – Funk	6 – Funk	3 – Parker	Hynes Athletic Center (1,372); New Rochelle, New York
January 21, 2019; 7:00 pm, ESPN3		at Manhattan	W 62–46	7–11 (2–4)	21 – Knudsen	6 – Knudsen	3 – Hines	Draddy Gymnasium (894); Bronx, New York
January 25, 2019; 7:00 pm, ESPN3		Quinnipiac	L 78–92	7–12 (2–5)	17 – Knudsen	6 – Herasme	3 – Parker	McCann Arena (1,309); Poughkeepsie, New York
January 27, 2019; 2:00 pm, ESPN3		at Rider	L 85–86	7–13 (2–6)	32 – Funk	7 – Lamb	6 – Dozic	Alumni Gymnasium (1,502); Lawrenceville, New Jersey
January 31, 2019; 7:00 pm, ESPN3		Iona	W 78–74	8–13 (3–6)	15 – Lamb	9 – Dozic	4 – Knudsen	McCann Arena (1,093); Poughkeepsie, New York
February 2, 2019; 7:00 pm, ESPN+		Fairfield	L 52–57	8–14 (3–7)	17 – Parker	7 – Lamb	2 – Parker	McCann Arena (1,455); Poughkeepsie, New York
February 4, 2019; 7:00 pm, ESPN3		at Canisius	W 78–71 ^{OT}	9–14 (4–7)	17 – Dozic	5 – Dozic	6 – Dozic	Koessler Athletic Center (943); Buffalo, New York
February 8, 2019; 7:00 pm, ESPN+		Niagara	W 79–58	10–14 (5–7)	25 – Funk	7 – Dozic	7 – Dozic	McCann Arena (1,131); Poughkeepsie, New York
February 15, 2019; 8:00 pm, ESPN+		at Quinnipiac	W 63–61	11–14 (6–7)	14 – Williams	4 – Williams	6 – Parker	People's United Center (1,978); Hamden, Connecticut
February 17, 2019; 2:00 pm, ESPN+		at Monmouth	W 75–67	12–14 (7–7)	15 – Parker	6 – Parker	5 – Hines	OceanFirst Bank Center (2,818); West Long Branch, New Jersey
February 22, 2019; 7:00 pm, ESPN+		Saint Peter's	L 59–65	12–15 (7–8)	19 – Parker	7 – Knudsen	2 – Parker	McCann Arena (1,323); Poughkeepsie, New York
February 24, 2019; 2:00 pm, ESPN+		at Siena	L 55–67	12–16 (7–9)	15 – Parker	7 – Lamb	6 – Parker	Times Union Center (6,806); Albany, New York
March 1, 2019; 7:00 pm, ESPN+		at Fairfield	L 44–59	12–17 (7–10)	16 – Parker	10 – Lamb	2 – Parker	Alumni Hall (2,479); Fairfield, Connecticut
March 3, 2019; 2:00 pm, ESPN+		Rider	L 64–75	12–18 (7–11)	19 – Parker	7 – Sjoberg	4 – Lamb	McCann Arena (1,619); Poughkeepsie, New York
MAAC tournament
March 11, 2019; 5:00 pm, ESPN3	(8)	vs. (9) Saint Peter's; First Round	L 68–71 ^{OT}	12–19	22 – Parker	6 – Lamb	4 – Parker	Times Union Center; Albany, New York
*Non-conference game. ^{#}Rankings from AP Poll. (#) Tournament seedings in parentheses. All times are in Eastern.

== Awards ==
Following the season, two Marist players were selected to All-MAAC teams. Senior guard Brian Parker was awarded All-MAAC Third Team honors, leading the Red Foxes in scoring, minutes played, field goal percentage, and assists per game. Senior guard Ryan Funk was named the MAAC Men's Basketball Sixth Player of the Year, averaging 11.7 points per game, while making 45 percent of his three-point shots during league play. He was the first Red Fox to win the award.

== Statistics ==
=== Players ===
Legend
GP	Games played	GS	Games started	MPG	Minutes per game
FG%	Field-goal percentage	3P%	3-point field-goal percentage	FT%	Free-throw percentage
RPG	Rebounds per game	APG	Assists per game	SPG	Steals per game
BPG	Blocks per game	PPG	Points per game	Source:

Player	GP	GS	MPG	FG%	3FG%	FT%	RPG	APG	SPG	BPG	PPG
Ryan Carmello	10	0	1.8	1.000	–	.667	0.1	–	–	–	0.8
Aleksandar Dozic	31	1	16.7	.461	.342	.839	3.5	1.9	0.5	0.5	7.0
Ryan Funk	30	2	27.8	.414	.395	.917	2.9	0.4	0.5	0.2	11.7
Matthew Herasme	31	0	17.5	.382	.179	.732	2.9	0.5	0.6	0.0	3.1
Darius Hines	31	29	26.9	.409	.349	.824	1.6	1.8	0.8	0.1	6.7
David Knudsen	31	31	20.3	.433	.393	.895	2.5	1.0	0.6	0.1	7.3
Isaiah Lamb	31	30	24.5	.421	.365	.623	4.7	0.8	0.8	0.2	7.5
Tucker Lee	7	0	1.3	.000	.000	–	–	–	0.1	–	0.0
Luke Nedrow	29	0	9.2	.464	.406	.500	1.4	0.5	0.1	0.2	2.4
Brian Parker	31	31	28.5	.489	.325	.603	3.8	3.5	0.6	0.1	14.9
Michael Servetas	3	0	1.0	–	–	–	0.3	–	–	–	–
Tobias Sjoberg	31	30	14.5	.508	–	.640	3.0	0.8	0.3	0.3	2.5
Austin Williams	31	1	16.4	.524	.400	.491	2.4	1.1	0.7	0.1	4.5
TOTALS	31	–	–	.449	.363	.685	31.1	12.1	5.5	1.7	67.3
OPPONENTS	31	–	–	.445	.355	.701	32.7	13.2	5.6	3.2	69.3

==== MAAC Leaders ====
Scoring

- Brian Parker (14.9/game): 9th
- Ryan Funk (11.7/game): 18th

Rebounding

- Isaiah Lamb (4.7/game): 22nd

Field-goal percentage

- Brian Parker (.489): 10th

Assists per game

- Brian Parker (3.5/game): 6th
- Aleksandar Dozic (1.9/game): 21st

Steals per game

- Darius Hines (0.8/game): 25th

3-Point Field Goal Percentage (minimum 1 made per game)

- Ryan Funk (.395): 8th
- David Knudsen (.393): 10th

3-Point Field Goals Made

- Ryan Funk (79): 4th

Blocked Shots

- Aleksandar Dozic (15): 20th

Assist/Turnover Ratio (minimum 3 assists/game)

- Brian Parker (1.1): 7th

Offensive Rebounds

- Tobias Sjoberg (43): 18th
- Isaiah Lamb (41): 20th

Minutes Played

- Brian Parker (28.5/game): 22nd
- Ryan Funk (27.8/game): 23rd

To qualify, players must have appeared in 75% of team's games.

== See also ==
- 2018–19 Marist Red Foxes women's basketball team
