= 2019 Ivy League men's basketball tournament =

- Classification: Division I
- Season: 2018–19
- Teams: 4
- Site: John J. Lee Amphitheater; New Haven, Connecticut
- Champions: Yale (1st title)
- Winning coach: James Jones (1st title)
- MVP: Alex Copeland (Yale)
- Television: ESPNU, ESPN2

2018–19 Ivy League men's basketball standings
	Conf.				Overall
Team	W		L	PCT	W		L	PCT
x-Harvard	10	–	4	.714	19	–	12	.613
x-Yale †	10	–	4	.714	22	–	8	.733
Princeton	8	–	6	.571	16	–	12	.571
Penn	7	–	7	.500	19	–	12	.613
Cornell	7	–	7	.500	15	–	16	.484
Brown	7	–	7	.500	20	–	12	.625
Columbia	5	–	9	.357	10	–	18	.357
Dartmouth	2	–	12	.143	11	–	19	.367
† 2019 Ivy League tournament winner x - Ivy League co-champions

The 2019 Ivy League men's basketball tournament was the postseason men's basketball tournament for the Ivy League of the 2018–19 NCAA Division I men's basketball season. It was held on March 16 and 17, 2019, at the John J. Lee Amphitheater on the campus of Yale University in New Haven, Connecticut. League co-champions Harvard and Yale met in the final with Yale winning 97–85. Yale received the Ivy League's automatic bid to the 2019 NCAA tournament. Yale lost 74–79 in the first round to (3) LSU.

This was the last Ivy League tournament to be held for three years due to COVID-19 disruptions. The 2020 edition was never played, and the Ivy League canceled its entire 2020–21 season.

== Seeds ==
The top four teams in the Ivy League regular-season standings qualify for the tournament and are seeded according to their records in conference play, resulting in a Shaughnessy playoff. If a tie for any of the top four positions exists, tiebreakers are applied in the following order:

- Head-to-head record between teams involved in the tie.
- Record against the top team(s) not involved in the tie in order of conference record, going down through the seedings until the tie is broken.
- Average of the teams' ranking in the following computer systems: NCAA NET, Sagarin, KenPom, and ESPN Basketball Percentage Index.

Seed	School	Record	Tiebreaker
1	Harvard	10–4	2–0 vs. Yale
2	Yale	10–4	0–2 vs. Harvard
3	Princeton	8–6	
4	Pennsylvania	7–7	3–1 vs. Brown/Cornell

== Schedule ==
Session	Game	Time	Matchup	Score	Television	Attendance
Semifinals – Saturday, March 16
1	1	12:30 pm	No. 1 Harvard vs. No. 4 Penn	66–58	ESPNU	
1	2	3:00 pm	No. 2 Yale vs. No 3. Princeton	83–77	ESPNU	
Championship – Sunday, March 17
2	3	12:00 pm	No. 1 Harvard vs. No. 2 Yale	85–97	ESPN2	
Game times in Eastern Time. Rankings denote tournament seeding.

== Bracket ==
Semifinals; Saturday, March 16; ESPNU
1	Harvard	66
4	Penn	58
2	Yale	83
3	Princeton	77

Championship; Sunday, March 17; ESPN2
1	Harvard	85
2	Yale	97

== See also ==
- 2019 Ivy League women's basketball tournament
