= James Jones (basketball, born 1964) =

American college basketball coach (born 1964)

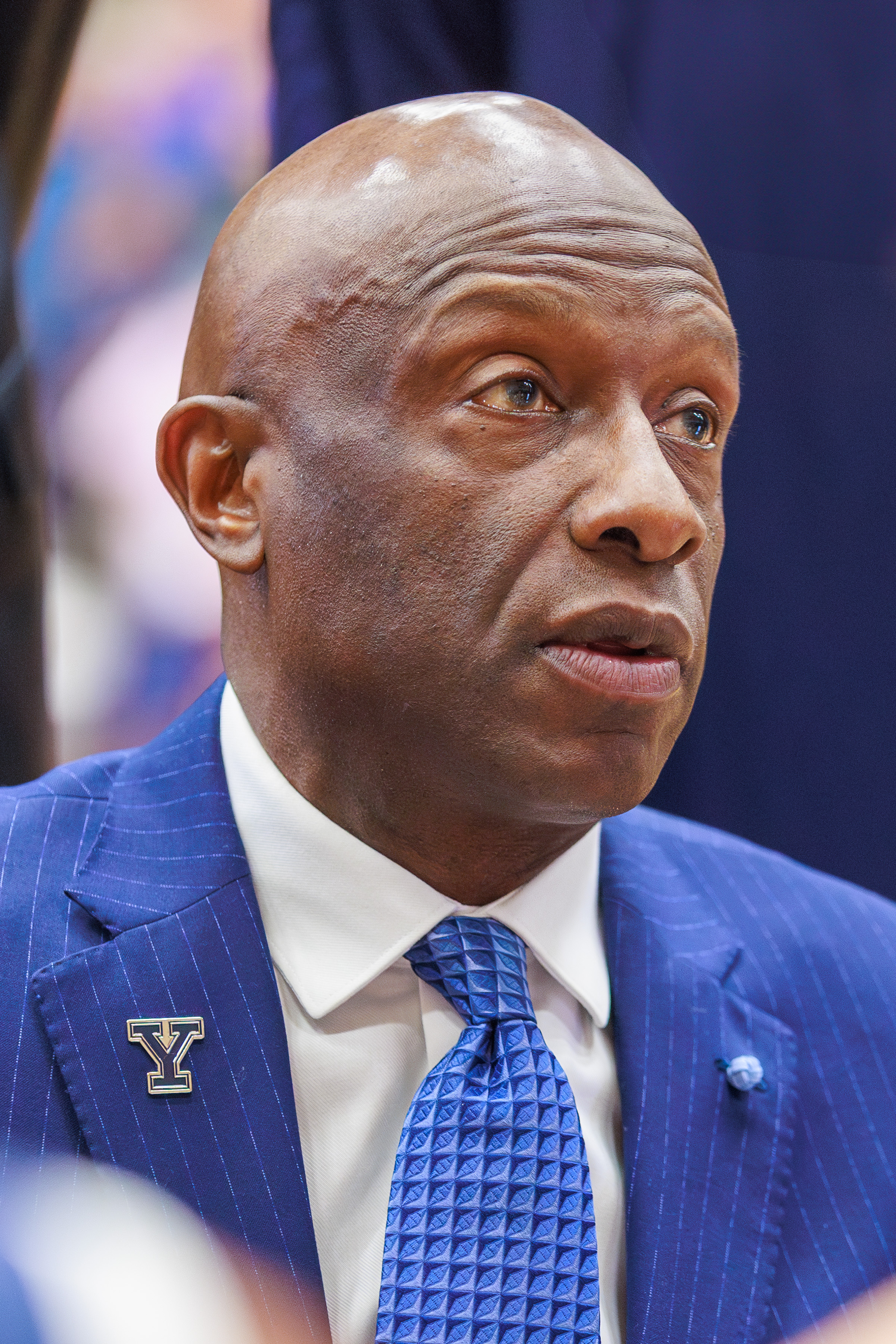
- Jones in 2025

Current position
- Title: Head coach
- Team: Yale
- Conference: Ivy League
- Record: 445–329 (.575)

Biographical details
- Born: February 20, 1964 (age 62); Long Island, New York, U.S.

Playing career
- 1982–1986: Albany

Coaching career (HC unless noted)
- 1990–1995: Albany (assistant)
- 1995–1997: Yale (assistant)
- 1997–1999: Ohio (assistant)
- 1999–present: Yale

Head coaching record
- Overall: 445–329 (.575)
- Tournaments: 2–5 (NCAA Division I); 1–3 (NIT); 4–2 (CIT)

Accomplishments and honors

Championships
- 8 Ivy League regular season (2002, 2015, 2016, 2019, 2020, 2023, 2025, 2026); 4 Ivy League tournament (2019, 2022, 2024, 2025)

Awards
- Hugh Durham Award (2016); Ben Jobe Award (2019); 4× Ivy League Coach of the Year (2015, 2016, 2020, 2023)

James Fitzgerald Jones (born February 20, 1964) is an American men's college basketball coach who is the head coach at Yale University.

Born on Long Island, Jones played college basketball at SUNY Albany and worked as a sales executive for NCR Corporation before beginning his coaching career. Jones succeeded Dick Kuchen as the 22nd men's basketball head coach of Yale University on April 27, 1999. On March 17, 2016, Jones and the Bulldogs upset the fifth-seeded Baylor University Bears in the first round of the 2016 NCAA Division I men's basketball tournament. On March 22, 2024, Jones and the Bulldogs upset the fourth-seeded Auburn University Tigers in the first round of the 2024 NCAA Division I men's basketball tournament.

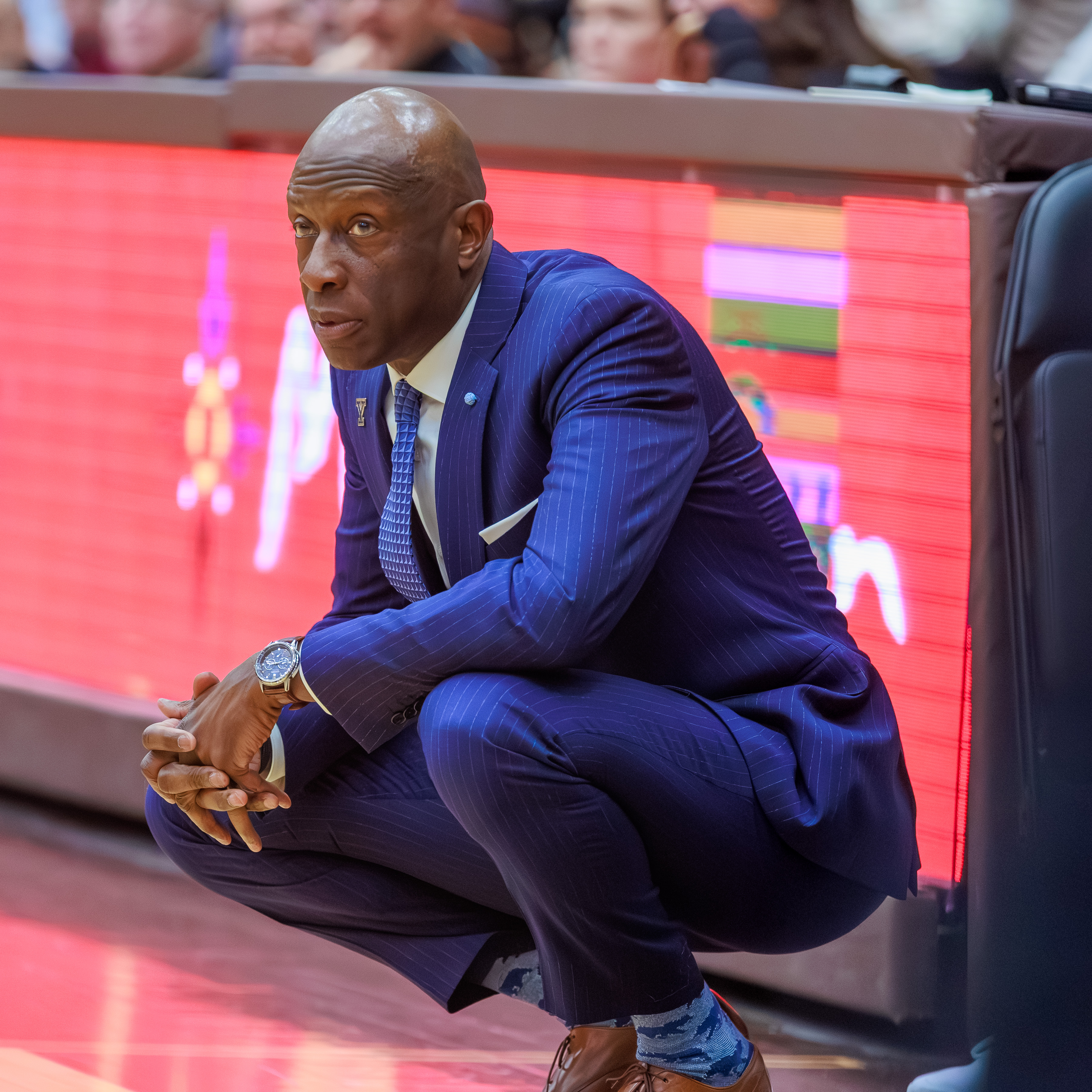
Jones watches the action

Five of Jones' assistants have gone on to become head coaches: Ted Hotaling (University of New Haven), Rob Senderoff (Kent State University), Isaiah Cavaco (Oberlin College), Mark Sembrowich (Academy of Art University), and Mark Gilbride (Clarkson University).

Jones was inducted into New England Basketball Hall of Fame in 2015, is a four-time Ivy League Coach of the Year (2015, 2016, 2020 and 2023), and has been named the NABC District 13 Coach of the Year three times.

His brother, Joe Jones, is the current men's basketball head coach at Boston University and was previously the men's basketball head coach at Columbia University.

== Head coaching record ==
Record table
Season	Team	Overall	Conference	Standing	Postseason
Yale Bulldogs (Ivy League) (1999–present)
1999–00	Yale	7–20	5–9	5th	
2000–01	Yale	10–17	7–7	4th	
2001–02	Yale	21–11	11–3	T–1st	NIT Second Round
2002–03	Yale	14–13	8–6	4th	
2003–04	Yale	12–15	7–7	4th	
2004–05	Yale	11–16	7–7	3rd	
2005–06	Yale	15–14	7–7	4th	
2006–07	Yale	14–13	10–4	2nd	
2007–08	Yale	13–15	7–7	4th	
2008–09	Yale	13–15	8–6	2nd	
2009–10	Yale	12–19	6–8	4th	
2010–11	Yale	15–13	8–6	3rd	
2011–12	Yale	19–10	9–5	4th	CIT First Round
2012–13	Yale	14–17	8–6	3rd	
2013–14	Yale	19–14	9–5	2nd	CIT Runner-Up
2014–15	Yale	22–10	11–3	T–1st	
2015–16	Yale	23–7	13–1	1st	NCAA Division I Round of 32
2016–17	Yale	18–11	9–5	3rd	
2017–18	Yale	16–15	9–5	3rd	
2018–19	Yale	22–8	10–4	T–1st	NCAA Division I Round of 64
2019–20	Yale	23–7	11–3	1st	Postseason cancelled due to COVID-19
2020–21	Yale (Note: Yale did not play in the 2020–21 school year due to COVID-19 concerns.)				
2021–22	Yale	19–12	11–3	2nd	NCAA Division I Round of 64
2022–23	Yale	21–9	10–4	T–1st	NIT First Round
2023–24	Yale	23–10	11–3	2nd	NCAA Division I Round of 32
2024–25	Yale	22–8	13–1	1st	NCAA Division I Round of 64
2025–26	Yale	24–7	11–3	1st	NIT First Round
2026–27	Yale	3–3	0–0		
Yale:		445–329 (.575)	236–128 (.648)		
Total:		445–329 (.575)			
National champion Postseason invitational champion Conference regular season champion Conference regular season and conference tournament champion Division regular season champion Division regular season and conference tournament champion Conference tournament champion
