= Viewpoint School =

School in Calabasas, California, US

Location
- 23620 Mulholland Highway; Calabasas, California 91302; United States; 34°8′8.42″N 118°38′34.04″W

Information
- Type: Independent, College Preparatory, Coeducational
- Motto: Fide et Amore (Faithful and Love)
- Established: 1961
- Head of school: Mark McKee
- Faculty: 159
- Enrollment: 1200
- Average class size: 20 students
- Student to teacher ratio: 8:1
- Campus size: 40 acres (16 ha)
- Campus type: Suburban
- Colors: Red, White and Navy Blue
- Athletics: 130 teams (5th through 12th grade)
- Athletics conference: CIF Southern Section; Gold Coast League
- Mascot: Patriot Pete
- Nickname: Patriots
- Website: www.viewpoint.org

Viewpoint School is an independent school located in Calabasas, California. The school is coeducational, with students enrolled from Transitional Kindergarten through the twelfth grade. Enrollment in the 2014–15 school year was 1,200, making it the fourth largest institution in the California Association of Independent Schools (CAIS).

== History ==
In Viewpoint School's first year, 1961, it occupied leased facilities in Encino, California and enrolled 24 students. Mrs. Thelma Sitton was the school's first principal. The school's enrollment and recognition grew. Portions of the campus moved west and for several years shared space with a church on Platt Avenue in Woodland Hills. For the 1965–66 school year, Viewpoint moved grades 6, 7, and 8 to its current location in Calabasas, constructing its first building (3 trailers) there. A permanent lower school building followed on shortly thereafter.

As enrollment increased in the 1960s and 1970s, Viewpoint included additional grades to meet demand and Viewpoint graduated its first senior class in 1982. This year, construction was also begun on Viewpoint's second academic building. Art O'Leary served as headmaster of Viewpoint from 1980 to 1986. Dr. Robert J. Dworkoski began his term on O'Leary's retirement in 1986. In June 2014, after 28 years as Headmaster, Dr. Dworkoski moved into the role of President of the Viewpoint Educational Foundation. During the 2014–15 school year, Paul Rosenbaum served as Interim Head of School. As of June 2015, Mark McKee is Head of School.

In 2005, Viewpoint opened a third building in the first phase of the School's Master Plan. A new athletic field was completed in 2007, a library in 2009, and a new 75,000-square-foot (7,000 m^{2}) arts and athletics facility was completed fall 2011. It includes classrooms, science labs, and art studios. The Paul Family Athletic Center features a 900-seat gymnasium for volleyball and basketball, as well as additional space for a fitness center, locker rooms, and coaches' offices. In February 2015, the School opened the 4,100 square-foot Balaban-Webster Team Center.

== Curriculum ==
As of 1988 the school offered French instruction from Pre-Kindergarten through grade 12, and Viewpoint required secondary students in grades 7–12 to have at least three years of foreign language instruction in French, Spanish, Latin or Mandarin. Foreign language instruction was four days per week for grades 9-12 and five days per week for grades 7 and 8.

== Controversy ==
Viewpoint was accused of shielding a teacher who had been convicted of sexually abusing a student while working at a prior school. Viewpoint has received media attention about its vape control policies.

== Athletics ==
Viewpoint School fields 22 varsity athletic teams in the California Interscholastic Federation Southern Section. Teams also compete at the junior varsity and middle school levels. The Patriots have won 18 CIF Southern Section Championships in the past eight years. Since 2008, Viewpoint's Upper School Athletic teams have won 57 team and individual league titles, and nine CIF Southern Section Titles. Viewpoint was awarded the Commissioner's Cup, which recognizes “comprehensive excellence in interscholastic competition” for its boys athletic program in 2006–07. Seven of Viewpoint's teams were recognized as CIF All-Academic in the last 12 years. Viewpoint's competitive athletics start in 4th grade, and get more competitive by middle school. Each season, the students choose the sport they would like to do from the selection of sports for the season. This is just an introduction to all the sports. They play against other schools, when they start sports in 4th grade. Every single grade before that, the children have P.E. every day.

== Accreditation and membership ==
Viewpoint School is accredited by and/or affiliated with the following organizations:

- The Western Association of Schools and Colleges
- The National Association of Independent Schools
- The California Association of Independent Schools
- The Cum Laude Society
- National Association of Principals of Schools for Girls
- National Association of Secondary School Principals
- A Better Chance
- Association of College Counselors in Independent Schools
- National Association of College Admission Counseling
- Western Association of College Admission Counseling

== Notable alumni ==
- Tiffany Trump (class of 2012) - Socialite and daughter of businessman and 45th President of the United States, Donald Trump
- Miye Oni (class of 2015) - NBA basketball player who played for the Utah Jazz
- Max Cutler (class of 2009) - businessman and founder of the podcasting platform Parcast
- Momma (band)
