= 2019–20 Ivy League men's basketball season =

- League: NCAA Division I
- Sport: Basketball
- Teams: 8

Regular Season
- Season champions: Yale
- Season MVP: A. J. Brodeur
- Season MVP: Paul Atkinson

Tournament
- Champions: Cancelled

Basketball seasons
- ← 2018–19 2021–22 →

2019–20 Ivy League men's basketball standings
	Conf.				Overall
Team	W		L	PCT	W		L	PCT
x-Yale	11	–	3	.786	23	–	7	.767
Harvard	10	–	4	.714	21	–	8	.724
Princeton	9	–	5	.643	14	–	13	.519
Penn	8	–	6	.571	16	–	11	.593
Brown	8	–	6	.571	15	–	12	.556
Dartmouth	5	–	9	.357	12	–	17	.414
Cornell	4	–	10	.286	7	–	20	.259
Columbia	1	–	13	.071	6	–	24	.200
x – Ivy League champions Ivy League tournament canceled due to COVID-19 pandemic

The 2019–20 Ivy League men's basketball season is the Ivy League's 66th season of basketball. Yale and Harvard are defending regular season champions. Yale defeated Harvard in the Ivy League tournament to each the conference's bid to the NCAA tournament last season.

The 2019-2020 Ivy League Tournament was scheduled to take place at Harvard University, March 13–15, 2020.

On March 10, 2020, the Ivy League announced that the 2020 Ivy League Tournament is cancelled due to the coronavirus. Yale was to represent the Ivy League in the 2020 NCAA Men's basketball tournament.

The last Ivy League games were played on March 7th, 2020. 612 days later, the Ivy League would resume play after a hiatus due to the COVID-19 pandemic.

== Coaches ==
Team	Head coach	Seasons at school	Overall record at school	Ivy record	Ivy regular season championships	Ivy tournament championships	NCAA tournaments	NCAA Final Fours	NCAA championships
Brown	Mike Martin	7	93–112 (.454)	36–62 (.367)	0	0	0	0	0
Columbia	Jim Engles	3	29–53 (.354)	15–27 (.357)	0	0	0	0	0
Cornell	Brian Earl	3	35–53 (.398)	17–25 (.405)	0	0	0	0	0
Dartmouth	David McLaughlin	3	25–59 (.298)	9–33 (.214)	0	0	0	0	0
Harvard	Tommy Amaker	12	230–131 (.637)	116–52 (.690)	7	0	4	0	0
Penn	Steve Donahue	4	67–53 (.558)	30–26 (.536)	1	1	1	0	0
Princeton	Mitch Henderson	8	148–88 (.627)	76–36 (.679)	1	1	1	0	0
Yale	James Jones	21	327–278 (.540)	169–111 (.604)	4	1	2	0	0

Notes:

- All records, appearances, titles, etc. are from time with current school only.
- Overall and Ivy records are from time at current school through the end of the 2018–19 season.

== Players of the week ==
Week	Player of the Week	Rookie of the Week
Nov. 11	Brandon Anderson, Brown	Jordan Dingle, Penn
Nov. 18	Brandon Anderson (2), Brown	Chris Ledlum, Harvard
Nov. 25	Bryce Aiken, Harvard	Jordan Dingle (2), Penn
Dec. 2	Paul Atkinson, Yale	Jordan Dingle (3), Penn
Dec. 9	Paul Atkinson (2), Yale	Chris Ledlum (2), Harvard
Dec. 16	Richmond Aririguzoh, Princeton	Ryan Langborg, Princeton
Dec. 23	Paul Atkinson (3), Yale	Max Martz, Penn
Dec. 30	Chris Lewis, Harvard	Chris Lewis, Harvard
Jan. 6	Jaelin Llewellyn, Princeton	Chris Ledlum (3), Harvard
Jan. 13	Ryan Schwieger, Princeton	Tosan Evbuomwan, Princeton
Jan, 20	Jordan Bruner, Yale	Jack Forrest, Columbia
Jan. 27	A. J. Brodeur, Penn	Jordan Dingle (4), Penn
Feb. 3	Azar Swain, Yale	Jordan Dingle (5), Penn
Feb. 10	Tamenang Choh, Brown	Max Martz (2), Penn
Feb. 17	Chris Knight, Dartmouth	Chris Ledlum (4), Harvard
Feb. 24	Jordan Bruner (2), Yale	August Mahoney, Yale
Mar. 2	Chris Knight (2), Dartmouth	Max Martz (3), Penn
Mar. 9	A. J. Brodeur (2), Penn Zach Hunsaker, Brown	Jordan Dingle (6), Penn

== Conference matrix ==
	Brown	Columbia	Cornell	Dartmouth	Harvard	Penn	Princeton	Yale
vs. Brown	–	0−2	1−1	0−2	0–2	1–1	2−0	2–0
vs. Columbia	2−0	−	1−1	2−0	2–0	2–0	2−0	2–0
vs. Cornell	1−1	1−1	−	2−0	2–0	2–0	0−2	2–0
vs. Dartmouth	2−0	0−2	0−2	−	2–0	1–1	2−0	2–0
vs. Harvard	2−0	0−2	0−2	0−2	−	1–1	1−1	0–2
vs. Penn	1−1	0−2	0−2	1−1	1–1	−	2−0	1–1
vs. Princeton	0−2	0−2	2−0	0−2	1–1	0–2	−	2–0
vs. Yale	0−2	0−2	0−2	0−2	2–0	1–1	0−2	−
Total	8–6	1–13	4–10	5–9	10–4	8-6	9–5	11–3

== All-Conference teams and awards ==
On March 11, the Ivy League handed out its major awards.

Award	Recipients
Co-Player of the Year	A. J. Brodeur (Penn) Paul Atkinson (Yale)
Coach of the Year	James Jones (Yale)
Rookie of the Year	Jordan Dingle (Penn)
Co-Defensive Player of the Year	Jaylan Gainey (Brown) Jalen Gabbidon (Yale)
First Team	A. J. Broduer (Penn) Paul Atkinson (Yale); Azar Swain (Yale); Noah Kirkwood (Harvard); Richmond Aririguzoh (Princeton); Jordan Bruner (Yale)
Second Team	Chris Knight (Dartmouth) Jaelin Llewellyn (Princeton); Tamenang Choh (Brown); Chris Lewis (Harvard); Mike Smith (Columbia)
Honorable Mention	Devon Goodman (Penn) Terrance McBride (Cornell)
