= Mike Smith (basketball, born 1997) =

American basketball player (born 1997)

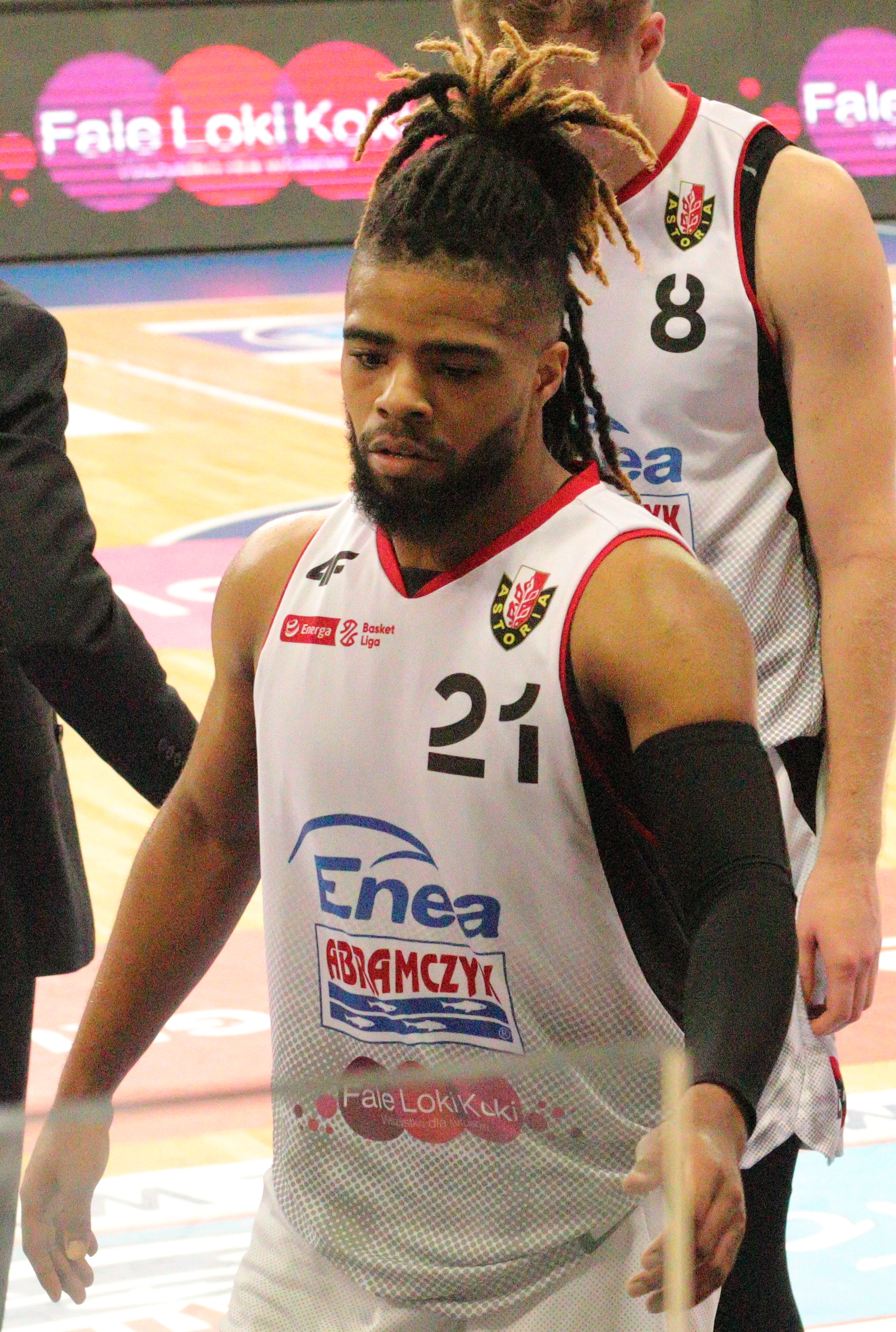
- Smith with Astoria Bydgoszcz in 2022

No. 21 – Pallacanestro Cantù
- Position: Point guard
- League: LBA

Personal information
- Born: October 13, 1997 (age 29) Burr Ridge, Illinois
- Listed height: 5 ft 11 in (1.80 m)
- Listed weight: 185 lb (84 kg)

Career information
- High school: Fenwick (Oak Park, Illinois)
- College: Columbia (2016–2020); Michigan (2020–2021)
- NBA draft: 2021: undrafted
- Playing career: 2021–present

Career history
- 2021–2022: Sioux Falls Skyforce
- 2022: Wellington Saints
- 2022–2023: Astoria Bydgoszcz
- 2023: Rostock Seawolves
- 2024–2025: Borac Čačak
- 2025: Karşıyaka Basket
- 2025–2026: ESSM Le Portel
- 2026: Bursaspor
- 2026: Mersin
- 2026–present: Cantù

Career highlights
- 2× Second-team All-Ivy League (2018, 2020)

Michael Soloman Smith (born October 13, 1997) is an American professional basketball player for Pallacanestro Cantù of the Italian Lega Basket Serie A (LBA). He played college basketball for the Columbia Lions and the Michigan Wolverines. He was the 2019–20 Ivy League scoring champion. He has also led both the Ivy League (2017–18) and the Big Ten (2020–21) in assists per game.

== Early life ==
As an eighth-grader in 2012, Smith led Burr Ridge Middle School in Burr Ridge, Illinois to an Illinois Elementary School Association state championship. He was a four-year varsity basketball starter at Fenwick High School in Oak Park, Illinois. On January 18, 2016, as a senior, Smith scored a career-high 38 points in a 71–68 win over Simeon Career Academy. Five days later, he scored 34 points against Riverside Brookfield High School. He led Fenwick to the Chicago Catholic League (CCL) championship, scoring a game-high 27 points against St. Joseph High School in the final. In his senior season, Smith averaged 19.3 points, 4.0 assists, 2.9 rebounds and 1.7 steals per game, helping his team to the Class 3A sectional final and a school-record 28 wins. He finished second in Illinois Mr. Basketball voting to Charlie Moore and left Fenwick with 1,800 career points, the second-most in school history behind Corey Maggette. He was named Pioneer Press All-Area player of the year and CCL player of the year. On March 26, Smith committed to play college basketball for Columbia over Dartmouth. He held offers from many other mid-major programs and was not rated by major recruiting services. Smith reopened his recruitment upon the departure of Columbia head coach Kyle Smith but was drawn back to program after a three-hour phone call with its new coach Jim Engles.

== College career ==
=== Columbia ===
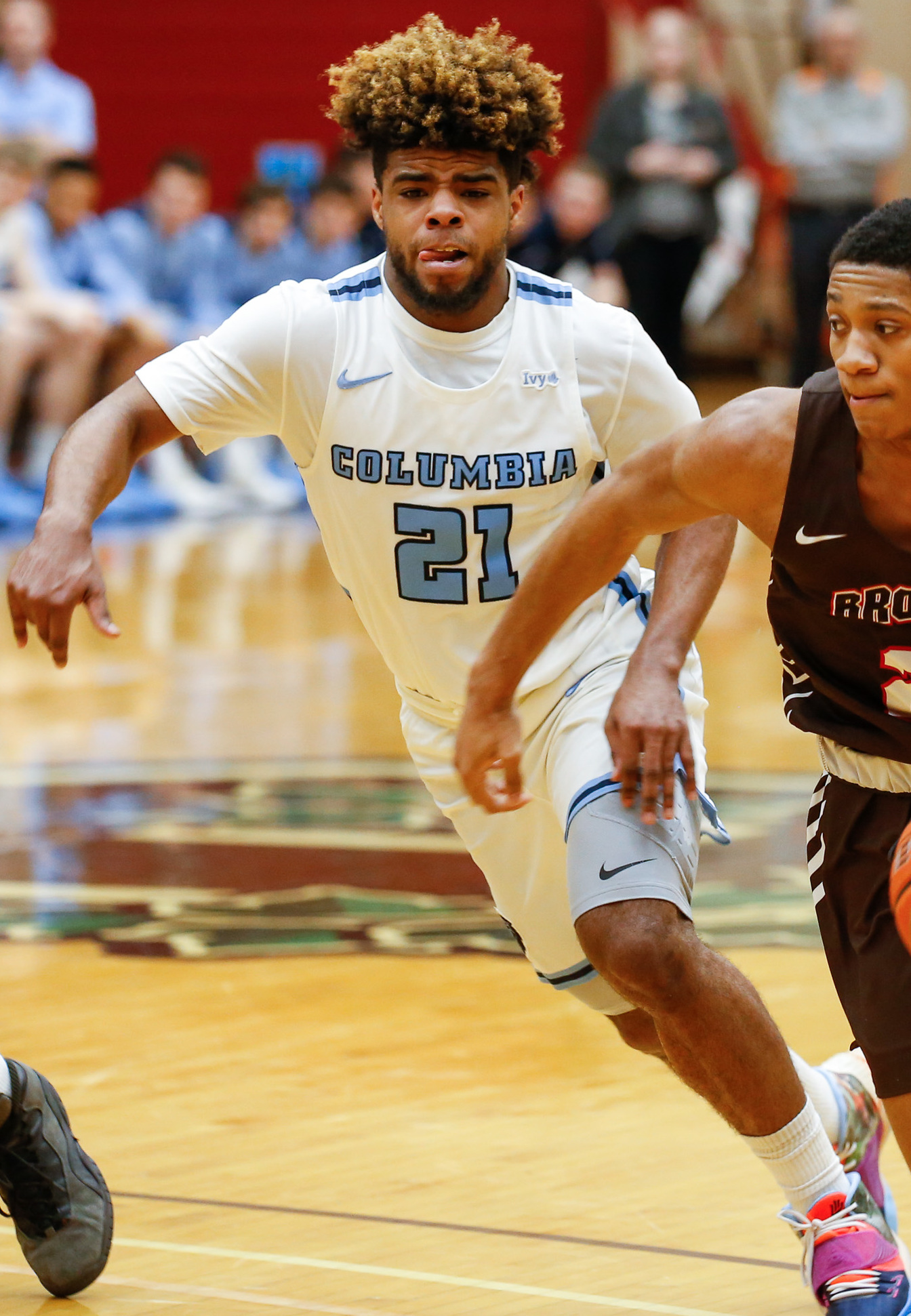
Smith at Columbia in 2020

On November 11, 2016, Smith made his collegiate debut for Columbia, scoring 14 points in a 73–66 win over Stony Brook. He scored a freshman season-high 24 points in a 67–62 loss to Cornell on January 21, 2017. As a freshman, Smith averaged 13.6 points and 3.4 assists per game, starting in all 27 games, and set the program's single-season first-year scoring record with 368 points.

On December 10, he scored a sophomore season-high 28 points in a 73–68 loss to Navy. He finished the season averaging 17.6 points, which led his team and ranked second in the Ivy League, and a conference-high 4.6 assists per game. Smith collected second-team All-Ivy League and third-team All-Metropolitan honors.

On November 16, 2018, his second game as a junior, he scored a then career-high 31 points in a 94–83 loss to Youngstown State. On December 2, Smith matched his career-high in scoring with 31 points and 5 steals in an 87–86 double overtime loss to Delaware. On December 12, it was announced that he would miss the remainder of the season with a torn meniscus suffered five days earlier against Bryant. In eight games, Smith averaged 15.8 points and 5 assists per game.

Smith returned to action in his senior season debut on November 5, 2019, scoring 22 points in a 65–63 loss to Lafayette. On February 15, 2020, he scored a career-high 38 points in a 77–73 double overtime loss to Harvard. It was the most points by a Columbia player in a single game since Buck Jenkins scored a school-record 47 points in 1991. One week later, Smith scored 37 points in an 83–65 loss to Yale. As a senior, he averaged a conference-leading 22.8 points, 4.5 assists and 4.1 rebounds per game while being named to the second team All-Ivy League. In his senior season, Smith scored 684 points, the second-highest single-season total in program history, and averaged the most points for an Ivy League player since 1989.

=== Michigan ===
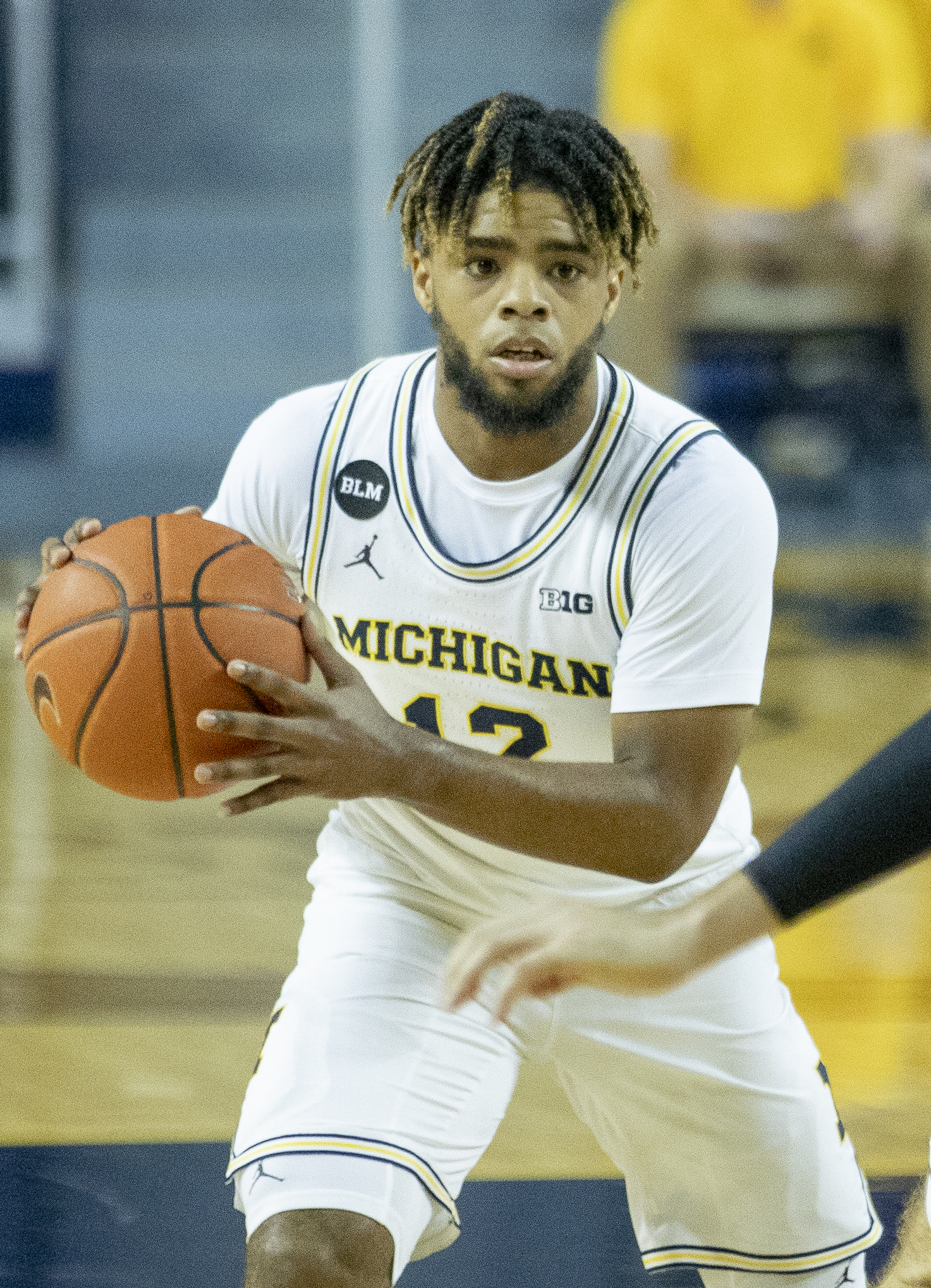
Smith with the Michigan Wolverines in 2020

On April 10, 2020, Smith announced that he would graduate and transfer to Michigan for his final season. He was attracted to the program because of head coach Juwan Howard. Smith was ranked the 11th best graduate transfer according to ESPN and chose the Wolverines over offers from Gonzaga, Arizona and Seton Hall. In his debut for Michigan on November 25, Smith scored 16 points and had eight assists in a 96–82 win against Bowling Green. On March 7, 2021, Smith scored 11 points and seven assists in a 64–70 loss to Michigan State. With his seven assists he surpassed 500 career assists. On March 12, Michigan opened its 2021 Big Ten men's basketball tournament play with a 79–66 victory over Maryland in the quarterfinals. Michigan was led by Smith with 18 points and set a Big Ten Tournament single-game record with 15 assists. The record stood until Braden Smith posted 16 on March 12 in the 2026 Big Ten men's basketball tournament against Northwestern. He averaged 9 points and 5.3 assists per game, helping lead the team to the Elite Eight of the NCAA Tournament. On April 7, 2021, Smith declared for the 2021 NBA draft, forgoing the additional season of eligibility the NCAA granted in light of the COVID-19 pandemic. His 5.3 assists per game also led the Big Ten conference.

== Professional career ==
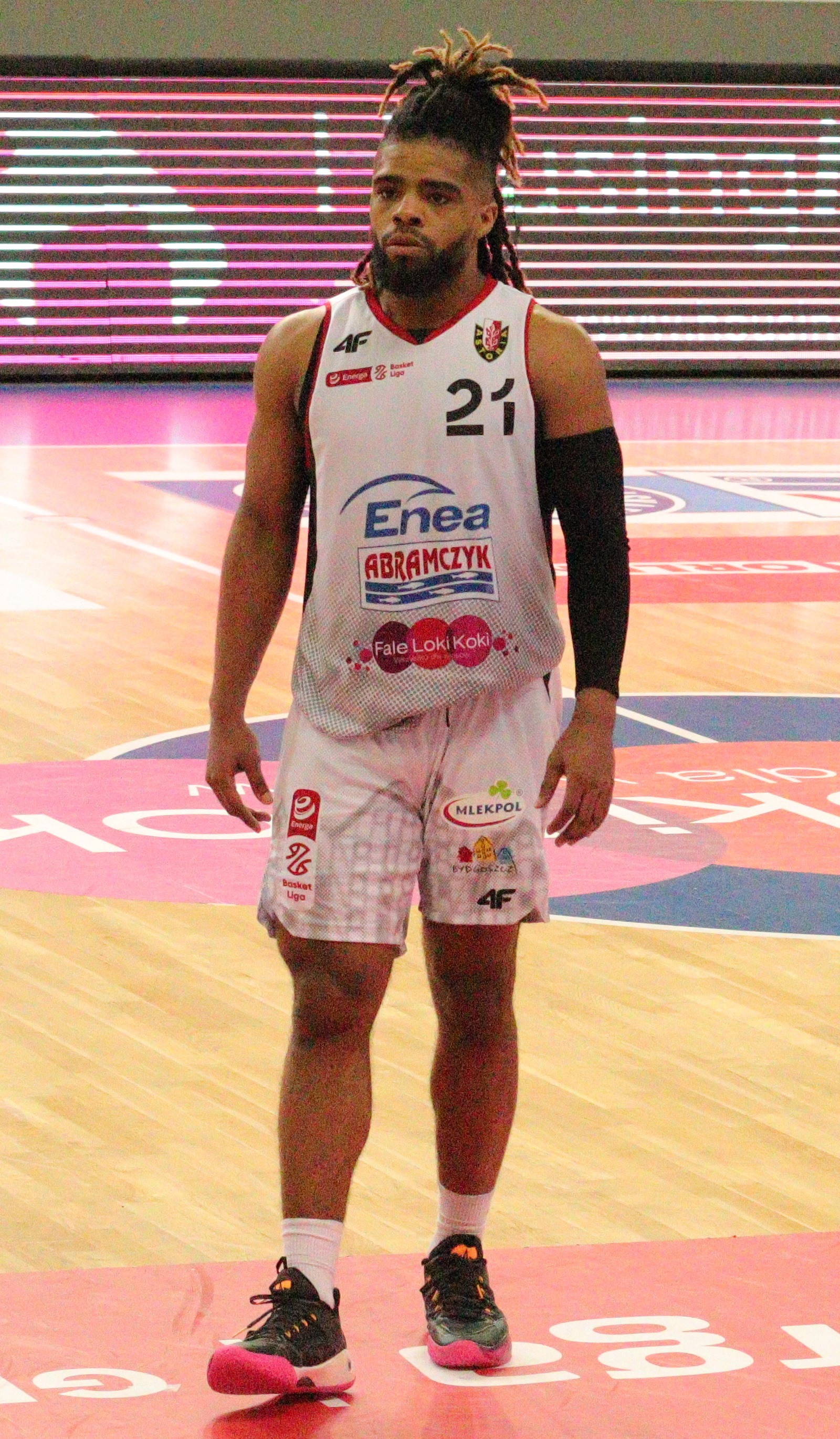
Smith in 2022 with Astoria Bydgoszcz

=== Sioux Falls Skyforce (2021–2022) ===
After going undrafted in the 2021 NBA draft, Smith joined the Milwaukee Bucks for the 2021 NBA Summer League. He was selected with the 13th pick of the second round of the 2021 NBA G League draft by the Sioux Falls Skyforce. In 42 games during the 2021–22 NBA G League season, he averaged 9.1 points, 2.5 rebounds and 3.8 assists per game.

=== Wellington Saints (2022) ===
On May 3, 2022, Smith signed with the Wellington Saints for the 2022 New Zealand NBL season.

=== Astoria Bydgoszcz (2022–2023) ===
On August 4, 2022, he has signed with Astoria Bydgoszcz of the Polish Basketball League (PLK).

=== Rostock Seawolves (2023) ===
On July 11, 2023, he signed with Rostock Seawolves of the Basketball Bundesliga (BBL).

=== Karşıyaka Basket (2025) ===
On March 22, 2025, he signed with Karşıyaka Basket of the Basketbol Süper Ligi (BSL).

=== ESSM Le Portel (2025–2026) ===
On July 11, 2025, he signed with ESSM Le Portel of the LNB Pro A.

=== Bursaspor (2026) ===
On February 25, 2026, he signed with Bursaspor Basketbol of the Basketbol Süper Ligi (BSL).

=== Mersin MSK (2026) ===
On August 14, 2026, he signed with Mersin MSK of the Türkiye Basketbol Ligi (TBL).

=== Pallacanestro Cantù (2026–present) ===
On November 20, 2026, he signed with Pallacanestro Cantù of the Italian Lega Basket Serie A for a second stint.

== Career statistics ==
Legend
GP	Games played	GS	Games started	MPG	Minutes per game
FG%	Field goal percentage	3P%	3-point field goal percentage	FT%	Free throw percentage
RPG	Rebounds per game	APG	Assists per game	SPG	Steals per game
BPG	Blocks per game	PPG	Points per game	**Bold**	Career high

=== College ===
Year	Team	GP	GS	MPG	FG%	3P%	FT%	RPG	APG	SPG	BPG	PPG
2016–17	Columbia	27	27	31.4	.401	.382	.821	2.1	3.5	1.1	.0	13.6
2017–18	Columbia	27	26	34.0	.390	.308	.842	2.6	4.6	1.1	.0	17.6
2018–19	Columbia	8	7	31.8	.415	.250	**.853**	2.5	5.0	**2.3**	.0	15.8
2019–20	Columbia	**30**	**30**	**37.7**	**.431**	.339	.813	**4.1**	4.5	1.5	.0	**22.8**
2020–21	Michigan	28	28	31.6	.412	**.418**	.793	2.8	**5.3**	.5	.0	9.0
Career		120	118	33.7	.411	.343	.824	2.9	4.5	1.1	.0	15.9

== Personal life ==
Smith was a fan of the Chicago Bulls while growing up. He became close friends with NBA player Jimmy Butler after meeting him at his high school team's Jordan Brand apparel unveiling presentation in 2016. He has trained with and lived with Butler in the offseason and has been mentored by him. Smith is a friend of the popular basketball YouTuber KOT4Q.
