= 2019–20 Cornell Big Red men's basketball team =

American college basketball season

2019–20 Cornell Big Red men's basketball
- Conference: Ivy League
- Record: 7–20 (4–10 Ivy)
- Head coach: Brian Earl (4th season)
- Assistant coaches: Jon Jaques; Alex Mumphard; Clay Wilson
- Home arena: Newman Arena

2019–20 Ivy League men's basketball standings
	Conf.				Overall
Team	W		L	PCT	W		L	PCT
x-Yale	11	–	3	.786	23	–	7	.767
Harvard	10	–	4	.714	21	–	8	.724
Princeton	9	–	5	.643	14	–	13	.519
Penn	8	–	6	.571	16	–	11	.593
Brown	8	–	6	.571	15	–	12	.556
Dartmouth	5	–	9	.357	12	–	17	.414
Cornell	4	–	10	.286	7	–	20	.259
Columbia	1	–	13	.071	6	–	24	.200
x – Ivy League champions Ivy League tournament canceled due to COVID-19 pandemic

The 2019–20 Cornell Big Red men's basketball team represented Cornell University in the 2019–20 NCAA Division I men's basketball season. The Big Red, led by fourth-year head coach Brian Earl, played their home games at Newman Arena in Ithaca, New York as members of the Ivy League. They finished the season 7–20, 4–10 in Ivy League play to finish in seventh place. They failed to qualify for the Ivy League tournament, although the tournament was ultimately cancelled due to the COVID-19 pandemic.

== Previous season ==
The Big Red finished the 2018–19 season 15–16 overall, 7–7 in Ivy League play, to finish in a three-way tie for fourth place. Due to tiebreakers, they failed to qualify for the Ivy League tournament. They were invited to the CIT, where they were defeated by Robert Morris in the first round.

== Roster ==
2019–20 Cornell Big Red men's basketball team
Players
Coaches

Pos.	#	Name	Height	Weight	Year	Hometown
G	1	Matt Harshany	6 ft 0 in (1.83 m)	180 lb (82 kg)	So	Pace, Florida
F	2	Marcus Filien	6 ft 7 in (2.01 m)	210 lb (95 kg)	Fr	Rensselaer, New York
F	3	Jimmy Boeheim	6 ft 8 in (2.03 m)	215 lb (98 kg)	Jr	Fayetteville, New York
G	4	Greg Dolan	6 ft 3 in (1.91 m)	175 lb (79 kg)	Fr	Williamsville, New York
G	5	Bryan Knapp	6 ft 1 in (1.85 m)	170 lb (77 kg)	Jr	Washington, D.C.
F	10	Chuks Uzoka	6 ft 6 in (1.98 m)	209 lb (95 kg)	Fr	Richmond, Texas
G	11	Terrance McBride	6 ft 2 in (1.88 m)	170 lb (77 kg)	Jr	Lynwood, California
F	12	Kobe Dickson	6 ft 9 in (2.06 m)	235 lb (107 kg)	So	Holcomb, Kansas
F	13	Thurston McCarty	6 ft 7 in (2.01 m)	175 lb (79 kg)	Sr	Shubuta, Mississippi
F	20	Chaz Mack	6 ft 6 in (1.98 m)	210 lb (95 kg)	Sr	Tucson, Arizona
F	21	Riley Voss	6 ft 6 in (1.98 m)	220 lb (100 kg)	Jr	Milford, Ohio
F	22	Josh Warren	6 ft 8 in (2.03 m)	223 lb (101 kg)	Sr	Downingtown, Pennsylvania
F	23	Jordan Jones	6 ft 5 in (1.96 m)	195 lb (88 kg)	Fr	Thousand Oaks, California
G	24	Max Samberg	6 ft 3 in (1.91 m)	190 lb (86 kg)	So	Rye, New York
G	25	Dean Noll	6 ft 2 in (1.88 m)	180 lb (82 kg)	So	Medford, New Jersey
G	32	Noah Gear	6 ft 4 in (1.93 m)	185 lb (84 kg)	Sr	Potomac, Maryland
G	50	Sarju Patel	6 ft 3 in (1.91 m)	170 lb (77 kg)	Jr	Daleville, Virginia

Head coach

- Brian Earl (Princeton)

Assistant coach(es)

- Jon Jaques (Cornell)
- Alex Mumphard (Greenville)
- Clay Wilson (Princeton)

Legend

- (C) Team captain
- (S) Suspended
- (I) Ineligible
- (W) Walk-on
- Injured
- Current redshirt

Roster
Last update: November 6, 2019

== Schedule and results ==
Date time, TV	Opponent	Result	Record	Site (attendance) city, state
Non-conference regular season
November 5, 2019*; 7:00 pm, ESPN+	Binghamton	W 84–64	1–0	Newman Arena (1,282); Ithaca, NY
November 10, 2019*; 1:00 pm, NEC Front Row	at Bryant	L 81–82	1–1	Chace Athletic Center (1,182); Smithfield, RI
November 13, 2019*; 7:00 pm, ESPN+	NJIT	L 58–59	1–2	Newman Arena (274); Ithaca, NY
November 16, 2019*; 1:00 pm, FSN	at DePaul	L 54–75	1–3	Wintrust Arena (3,837); Chicago, IL
November 20, 2019*; 7:00 pm, ACCNX	at Syracuse	L 53–72	1–4	Carrier Dome (21,123); Syracuse, NY
November 23, 2019*; 7:00 pm	at Coppin State	L 66–68 ^{OT}	1–5	Physical Education Complex (762); Baltimore, MD
November 26, 2019*; 7:00 pm, PLN	at Navy	L 61–72	1–6	Alumni Hall (804); Annapolis, MD
December 1, 2019*; 4:00 pm, ESPN+	Towson	Cancelled		Newman Arena; Ithaca, NY
December 7, 2019*; 1:00 pm, ESPN+	Lafayette	L 59–62	1–7	Newman Arena (994); Ithaca, NY
December 11, 2019*; 7:00 pm	at Colgate	L 58–66	1–8	Cotterell Court (876); Hamilton, NY
December 22, 2019*; 2:00 pm, ESPN+	at Hartford	L 76–80	1–9	Chase Arena at Reich Family Pavilion (662); West Hartford, CT
December 29, 2019*; 1:00 pm, ESPNU	at No. 20 Penn State	L 59–90	1–10	Bryce Jordan Center (8,316); University Park, PA
January 7, 2020*; 7:00 pm, ESPN+	Purchase College	W 100–68	2–10	Newman Arena (335); Ithaca, NY
January 13, 2020*; 6:00 pm, ESPN+	Elmira	W 70–33	3–10	Newman Arena (319); Ithaca, NY
Ivy League regular season
January 18, 2020; 7:00 pm, ESPN+	at Columbia	L 61–75	3–11 (0–1)	Levien Gymnasium (1,823); New York, NY
January 25, 2020; 4:00 pm, ESPN+	Columbia	W 62–50	4–11 (1–1)	Newman Arena (2,416); Ithaca, NY
January 31, 2020; 7:00 pm, ESPN+	at Brown	L 63–74	4–12 (1–2)	Pizzitola Sports Center (1,145); Providence, RI
February 1, 2020; 7:00 pm, ESPN+	at Yale	L 71–86	4–13 (1–3)	John J. Lee Amphitheater (1,506); New Haven, CT
February 8, 2020; 2:00 pm, ESPN+	Princeton	W 73–62	5–13 (2–3)	Newman Arena (2,644); Ithaca, NY
February 9, 2020; 2:00 pm, ESPN+	Penn	L 73–79	5–14 (2–4)	Newman Arena (889); Ithaca, NY
February 14, 2020; 7:00 pm, ESPN+	at Harvard	L 63–85	5–15 (2–5)	Lavietes Pavilion (1,262); Boston, MA
February 15, 2020; 7:00 pm, ESPN+	at Dartmouth	L 53–75	5–16 (2–6)	Leede Arena (525); Hanover, NH
February 21, 2020; 7:00 pm, ESPN+	Yale	L 80–81 ^{2OT}	5–17 (2–7)	Newman Arena (631); Ithaca, NY
February 22, 2020; 6:00 pm, ESPN+	Brown	W 63–45	6–17 (3–7)	Newman Arena (628); Ithaca, NY
February 28, 2020; 7:00 pm, ESPN+	Dartmouth	L 70–82	6–18 (3–8)	Newman Arena (405); Ithaca, NY
February 29, 2020; 6:00 pm, ESPN+	Harvard	L 58–67	6–19 (3–9)	Newman Arena (639); Ithaca, NY
March 6, 2020; 7:00 pm, ESPN+	at Penn	L 64–78	6–20 (3–10)	The Palestra (2,965); Philadelphia, PA
March 7, 2020; 6:00 pm, ESPN+	at Princeton	W 85–82	7–20 (4–10)	Jadwin Gymnasium (2,553); Princeton, NJ
*Non-conference game. ^{#}Rankings from AP Poll. (#) Tournament seedings in parentheses. All times are in Eastern.
