= 2019–20 Brown Bears men's basketball team =

American college basketball season

2019–20 Brown Bears men's basketball
- Conference: Ivy League
- Record: 15–12 (8–6 Ivy)
- Head coach: Mike Martin (8th season)
- Associate head coach: T. J. Sorrentine (9th season as AHC; 12th overall season)
- Assistant coaches: Antone Gray (2nd season); Cooper Handelsman (1st season)
- Home arena: Pizzitola Sports Center (Capacity: 2,800)

2019–20 Ivy League men's basketball standings
	Conf.				Overall
Team	W		L	PCT	W		L	PCT
x-Yale	11	–	3	.786	23	–	7	.767
Harvard	10	–	4	.714	21	–	8	.724
Princeton	9	–	5	.643	14	–	13	.519
Penn	8	–	6	.571	16	–	11	.593
Brown	8	–	6	.571	15	–	12	.556
Dartmouth	5	–	9	.357	12	–	17	.414
Cornell	4	–	10	.286	7	–	20	.259
Columbia	1	–	13	.071	6	–	24	.200
x – Ivy League champions Ivy League tournament canceled due to COVID-19 pandemic

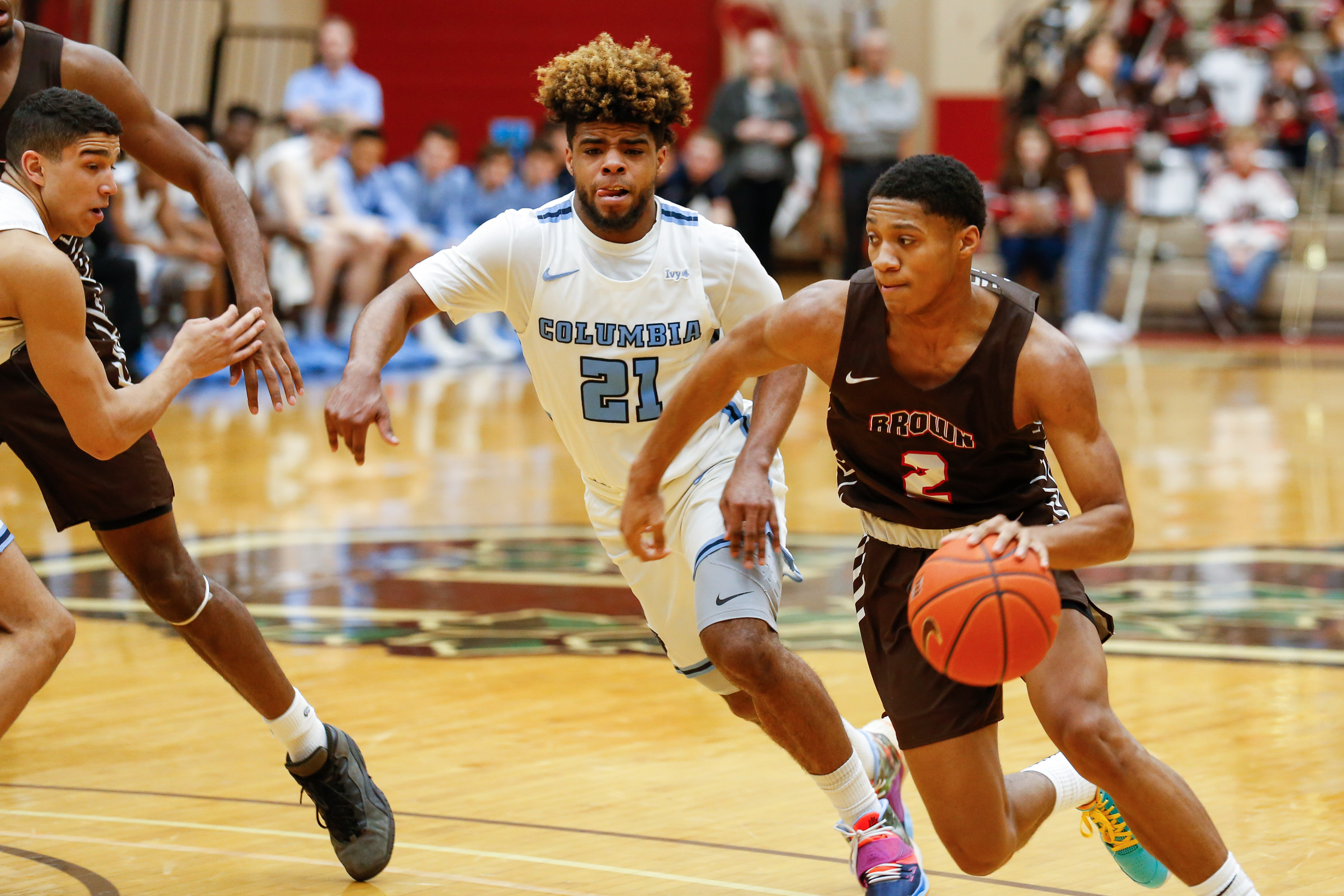
Columbia's Mike Smith (#21), behind Brown's Brandon Anderson (#2) with the ball. Brown defeated Columbia 72–66, February 1, 2020.

The 2019–20 Brown Bears men's basketball team represented Brown University in the 2019–20 NCAA Division I men's basketball season. The Bears, led by eighth-year head coach Mike Martin, played their home games at the Paul Bailey Pizzitola Memorial Sports Center in Providence, Rhode Island, as members of the Ivy League.

== Previous season ==
The Bears finished the 2018–19 season 20–12 overall, 7–7 in Ivy League play, to finish in a three-way tie for fourth place. Due to tiebreakers, they failed to qualify for the Ivy League tournament. They were invited to the CBI, where they defeated UAB in the first round, before falling to Loyola Marymount in the quarterfinals.

== Roster ==
2019–20 Brown Bears men's basketball team
Players
Coaches

Pos.	#	Name	Height	Weight	Year	Hometown
G	0	David Mitchell	6 ft 6 in (1.98 m)	210 lb (95 kg)	So	Roxbury, MA
G	1	Dan Friday	6 ft 4 in (1.93 m)	225 lb (102 kg)	Fr	Detroit, MI
G	2	Brandon Anderson	6 ft 1 in (1.85 m)	175 lb (79 kg)	Sr	Mahwah, NJ
F	3	Carsten Kogelnik	6 ft 6 in (1.98 m)	210 lb (95 kg)	Fr	Bethesda, MD
F	5	Joshua Howard	6 ft 6 in (1.98 m)	210 lb (95 kg)	Sr	Charlotte, NC
F	10	Davis Franks	6 ft 8 in (2.03 m)	205 lb (93 kg)	So	New York, NY
G	11	George Mawanda-Kalema	6 ft 3 in (1.91 m)	190 lb (86 kg)	Jr	Burke, VA
G/F	13	Josh Watts	6 ft 4 in (1.93 m)	190 lb (86 kg)	Fr	Beltsville, MD
G	15	Jake Shaper	6 ft 3 in (1.91 m)	195 lb (88 kg)	Jr	Houston, TX
G	20	Zach Hunsaker	6 ft 2 in (1.88 m)	185 lb (84 kg)	Sr	North Salt Lake, UT
F	22	Jaylan Gainey	6 ft 9 in (2.06 m)	220 lb (100 kg)	So	Greensboro, NC
G	23	Perry Cowan	6 ft 4 in (1.93 m)	205 lb (93 kg)	Fr	Chicago, IL
F	25	Tamenang Choh	6 ft 5 in (1.96 m)	210 lb (95 kg)	Jr	Lowell, MA
F	44	Matt DeWolf	6 ft 9 in (2.06 m)	230 lb (104 kg)	Jr	Barrington, RI
G		Noah Meren	6 ft 5 in (1.96 m)	200 lb (91 kg)	Jr	Providence, RI

Head coach

- Mike Martin (Brown)

Assistant coach(es)

- T. J. Sorrentine (Vermont)
- Antone Gray (Rhode Island College)
- Cooper Handelsman (Kenyon)

Legend

- (C) Team captain
- (S) Suspended
- (I) Ineligible
- (W) Walk-on
- Injured
- Current redshirt

Roster
Last update: November 3, 2019

== Schedule and results ==
Date time, TV	Rank^{#}	Opponent^{#}	Result	Record	Site (attendance) city, state
Non-conference regular season
November 5, 2019*; 7:00 pm		at Bryant	W 73–71	1–0	Chace Athletic Center (1,417); Smithfield, RI
November 9, 2019*; 4:30 pm, ESPN+		Canisius	W 75–68	2–0	Pizzitola Sports Center (812); Providence, RI
November 13, 2019*; 7:00 pm, ESPN+		Quinnipiac	W 70–68	3–0	Pizzitola Sports Center (704); Providence, RI
November 19, 2019*; 7:00 pm		at Sacred Heart	L 63–84	3–1	William H. Pitt Center (804); Fairfield, CT
November 23, 2019*; 4:30 pm, ESPN+		NJIT	W 79–63	4–1	Pizzitola Sports Center (555); Providence, RI
November 26, 2019*; 5:00 pm		at UMass Lowell	L 63–75	4–2	Costello Athletic Center (501); Lowell, MA
November 30, 2019*; 4:00 pm, ESPN+/NESN		Navy	L 56–76	4–3	Pizzitola Sports Center (743); Providence, RI
December 4, 2019*; 7:00 pm, ESPN+		Merrimack	W 82–55	5–3	Pizzitola Sports Center (786); Providence, RI
December 7, 2019*; 7:00 pm		at Stony Brook	L 63–79	5–4	Island Federal Credit Union Arena (2,943); Stony Brook, NY
December 10, 2019*; 7:00 pm, FS1		at St. John's	L 71–82	5–5	Carnesecca Arena (3,147); Queens, NY
December 28, 2019*; 11:30 am, ESPN2		at No. 4 Duke	L 50–75	5–6	Cameron Indoor Stadium (9,314); Durham, NC
January 2, 2020*; 7:00 pm, ESPN+		Rhode Island	W 85–75	6–6	Pizzitola Sports Center (2,738); Providence, RI
January 7, 2020*; 7:00 pm, ESPN+		Johnson & Wales (RI)	W 79–53	7–6	Pizzitola Sports Center (895); Providence, RI
Ivy League regular season
January 17, 2020; 7:00 pm, ESPN+		at Yale	L 56–70	7–7 (0–1)	John J. Lee Amphitheater (1,854); New Haven, CT
January 24, 2020; 7:00 pm, ESPNU		Yale	L 62–73	7–8 (0–2)	Pizzitola Sports Center (2,575); Providence, RI
January 31, 2020; 7:00 pm, ESPN+		Cornell	W 74–63	8–8 (1–2)	Pizzitola Sports Center (1,145); Providence, RI
February 1, 2020; 6:00 pm, ESPN+/NESNPlus		Columbia	W 72–66	9–8 (2–2)	Pizzitola Sports Center (1,384); Providence, RI
February 7, 2020; 7:00 pm, ESPN+		Dartmouth	W 67–65	10–8 (3–2)	Pizzitola Sports Center (1,106); Providence, RI
February 8, 2020; 6:00 pm, ESPN+		Harvard	W 72–71	11–8 (4–2)	Pizzitola Sports Center (2,010); Providence, RI
February 14, 2020; 7:00 pm, ESPN+		at Penn	W 75–63	12–8 (5–2)	The Palestra (2,454); Philadelphia, PA
February 15, 2020; 7:00 pm, ESPN+		at Princeton	L 54–73	12–9 (5–3)	Jadwin Gymnasium (2,464); Princeton, NJ
February 21, 2020; 7:00 pm, ESPN+		at Columbia	W 72–66	13–9 (6–3)	Levien Gymnasium (1,357); New York, NY
February 22, 2020; 6:00 pm, ESPN+		at Cornell	L 45–63	13–10 (6–4)	Newman Arena (628); Ithaca, NY
February 28, 2020; 7:00 pm, ESPN+		Princeton	L 49–71	13–11 (6–5)	Pizzitola Sports Center (1,748); Providence, RI
February 29, 2020; 6:00 pm, ESPN+/NESNPlus		Penn	L 68–73	13–12 (6–6)	Pizzitola Sports Center (1,909); Providence, RI
March 6, 2020; 7:00 pm, ESPN+		at Harvard	W 64-55	14-12 (7-6)	Lavietes Pavilion; Boston, MA
March 7, 2020; 7:00 pm, ESPN+		at Dartmouth	W 70-58	15-12 (8-6)	Leede Arena; Hanover, NH
*Non-conference game. ^{#}Rankings from AP Poll. (#) Tournament seedings in parentheses. All times are in Eastern.
