= 2019–20 Harvard Crimson men's basketball team =

American college basketball season

2019–20 Harvard Crimson men's basketball
- Conference: Ivy League
- Record: 21–8 (10–4 Ivy)
- Head coach: Tommy Amaker (13th season)
- Assistant coaches: Brian Eskildsen; Donny Guerinoni; Michael Sotsky
- Home arena: Lavietes Pavilion

2019–20 Ivy League men's basketball standings
	Conf.				Overall
Team	W		L	PCT	W		L	PCT
x-Yale	11	–	3	.786	23	–	7	.767
Harvard	10	–	4	.714	21	–	8	.724
Princeton	9	–	5	.643	14	–	13	.519
Penn	8	–	6	.571	16	–	11	.593
Brown	8	–	6	.571	15	–	12	.556
Dartmouth	5	–	9	.357	12	–	17	.414
Cornell	4	–	10	.286	7	–	20	.259
Columbia	1	–	13	.071	6	–	24	.200
x – Ivy League champions Ivy League tournament canceled due to COVID-19 pandemic

The 2019–20 Harvard Crimson men's basketball team represented Harvard University in the 2019–20 NCAA Division I men's basketball season. The Crimson, led by 13th-year head coach Tommy Amaker, played their home games at the Lavietes Pavilion in Boston, Massachusetts as members of the Ivy League. They finished the season 21–8, 10–4 in Ivy League play, to finish in second place.

== Previous season ==
The Crimson finished the 2018–19 season 19–12 overall, 10–4 in Ivy League play, finishing as co-regular-season champions, alongside Yale. In the Ivy League tournament, they defeated Penn in the semifinals, before losing to Yale in the championship game. As a regular-season league champion who failed to win their league tournament, they received an automatic bid to the NIT, where they defeated Georgetown in the first round, before falling to NC State in the second round.

== Roster ==
2019–20 Harvard Crimson men's basketball team
Players
Coaches

Pos.	#	Name	Height	Weight	Year	Hometown
F	0	Chris Lewis	6 ft 9 in (2.06 m)	235 lb (107 kg)	Sr	Alpharetta, GA
G	2	Luka Sakota	6 ft 5 in (1.96 m)	190 lb (86 kg)	Fr	Etobicoke, ON
G	3	Idan Tretout	6 ft 4 in (1.93 m)	200 lb (91 kg)	Fr	Brooklyn, NY
F	4	Chris Ledlum	6 ft 6 in (1.98 m)	225 lb (102 kg)	Fr	Brooklyn, NY
G	5	Rio Haskett	6 ft 3 in (1.91 m)	195 lb (88 kg)	Jr	Richmond, VA
G	10	Noah Kirkwood	6 ft 7 in (2.01 m)	215 lb (98 kg)	So	Ottawa, ON
G	11	Bryce Aiken	6 ft 0 in (1.83 m)	175 lb (79 kg)	Sr	Randolph, NJ
G	12	Spencer Freedman	6 ft 0 in (1.83 m)	170 lb (77 kg)	So	Pacific Palisades, CA
F	13	Tommy O'Neil	6 ft 8 in (2.03 m)	210 lb (95 kg)	Fr	Lexington, MA
G	20	Justin Bassey	6 ft 5 in (1.96 m)	215 lb (98 kg)	Sr	Denver, CO
F	21	Mason Forbes	6 ft 8 in (2.03 m)	205 lb (93 kg)	So	Folsom, CA
G	22	Christian Juzang	6 ft 2 in (1.88 m)	175 lb (79 kg)	Sr	Tarzana, CA
F	24	Kale Catchings	6 ft 6 in (1.98 m)	220 lb (100 kg)	So	O'Fallon, MO
F	25	Ciaran Brayboy	6 ft 9 in (2.06 m)	230 lb (104 kg)	Fr	Glencoe, IL
F	30	Danilo Djuricic	6 ft 8 in (2.03 m)	215 lb (98 kg)	Jr	Brampton, ON
F	31	Seth Towns	6 ft 7 in (2.01 m)	215 lb (98 kg)	Sr	Columbus, OH
G	33	Reed Farley	6 ft 4 in (1.93 m)	195 lb (88 kg)	Jr	La Jolla, CA
F	35	Robert Baker	6 ft 11 in (2.11 m)	205 lb (93 kg)	Sr	Woodstock, GA
F	44	Henry Welsh	6 ft 10 in (2.08 m)	250 lb (113 kg)	Sr	Redondo Beach, CA

Head coach

- Tommy Amaker (Duke)

Assistant coach(es)

- Brian Eskildsen (Tennessee)
- Donny Guerinoni (Nevada)
- Michael Sotsky (Harvard)

Legend

- (C) Team captain
- (S) Suspended
- (I) Ineligible
- (W) Walk-on
- Injured
- Current redshirt

Roster
Last update: November 13, 2024

== Schedule and results ==
Date time, TV	Rank^{#}	Opponent^{#}	Result	Record	Site (attendance) city, state
Non-conference regular season
November 5, 2019*; 7:00 p.m., ESPN+		MIT	W 84–27	1–0	Lavietes Pavilion (1,112); Boston, MA
November 8, 2019*; 8:00 p.m., NESNPlus		at Northeastern	L 79–84	1–1	Matthews Arena (1,557); Boston, MA
November 10, 2019*; 2:00 p.m., ESPN+		Maine	W 67–46	2–1	Lavietes Pavilion (1,234); Boston, MA
November 14, 2019*; 7:00 p.m., ESPN+		Siena	W 59–56	3–1	Lavietes Pavilion (1,269); Boston, MA
November 16, 2019*; 2:30 p.m., TSN/ESPN+		vs. Buffalo; James Naismith Classic	L 76–88	3–2	Scotiabank Arena; Toronto, ON
November 22, 2019*; 7:00 p.m.		at Holy Cross	W 82–74	4–2	Hart Center (1,972); Worcester, MA
November 28, 2019*; 1:30 p.m., ESPN2		vs. Texas A&M; Orlando Invitational quarterfinal	W 62–51	5–2	HP Field House (1,979); Orlando, FL
November 29, 2019*; 11:30 a.m., ESPN2		vs. No. 5 Maryland; Orlando Invitational semifinal	L 73–80	5–3	HP Field House (2,014); Orlando, FL
December 1, 2019*; 6:30 p.m., ESPN2		vs. USC; Orlando Invitational 3rd-place game	W 77–62	5–4	HP Field House (1,259); Orlando, FL
December 7, 2019*; 7:00 p.m., NESN/ESPN+		UMass	W 89–55	6–4	Lavietes Pavilion (1,636); Boston, MA
December 21, 2019*; 12:00 p.m.		at George Washington	W 88–75	7–4	Charles E. Smith Center (2,209); Washington, D.C.
December 22, 2019*; 2:00 p.m.		at Howard	W 60–55	8–4	Burr Gymnasium (1,092); Washington, D.C.
December 29, 2019*; 6:00 p.m., P12N		at California	W 71–63	9–4	Haas Pavilion (4,317); Berkeley, CA
December 30, 2019*; 9:00 p.m.		at San Francisco	W 84–81 ^{OT}	10–4	War Memorial Gymnasium (2,315); San Francisco, CA
January 4, 2020*; 2:00 p.m., ESPN+		UC Irvine	W 77–73	11–4	Lavietes Pavilion (1,636); Boston, MA
Ivy League regular season
January 18, 2020; 2:00 p.m., ESPN+		Dartmouth	L 67–72	12–4 (1–0)	Lavietes Pavilion (1,349); Boston, MA
January 25, 2020; 7:00 p.m., ESPN+		at Dartmouth	W 70–66	13–4 (2–0)	Leede Arena (1,564); Hanover, NH
January 31, 2020; 5:00 p.m., ESPNU		at Penn	L 72–75 ^{OT}	13–5 (2–1)	Palestra (3,146); Philadelphia, PA
February 1, 2020; 6:00 p.m., ESPN+		at Princeton	L 69–70	13–6 (2–2)	Jadwin Gymnasium (3,590); Princeton, NJ
February 7, 2020; 5:00 p.m., ESPNU		at Yale	W 78–77	14–6 (3–2)	John J. Lee Amphitheater (2,706); New Haven, CT
February 8, 2020; 6:00 p.m., ESPN+		at Brown	L 71–72	14–7 (3–3)	Pizzitola Sports Center (2,010); Providence, RI
February 14, 2020; 7:00 p.m., ESPN+		Cornell	W 85–63	15–7 (4–3)	Lavietes Pavilion (1,262); Boston, MA
February 15, 2020; 7:00 p.m., ESPN+		Columbia	W 77–73 ^{2OT}	16–7 (5–3)	Lavietes Pavilion (1,636); Boston, MA
February 21, 2020; 7:00 p.m., ESPN+		Princeton	W 61–60	17–7 (6–3)	Lavietes Pavilion (1,636); Boston, MA
February 22, 2020; 7:00 p.m., ESPN+		Penn	W 69–65	18–7 (7–3)	Lavietes Pavilion (1,636); Boston, MA
February 28, 2020; 7:00 p.m., ESPNews		at Columbia	W 77–69	19–7 (8–3)	Levien Gymnasium (2,307); New York, NY
February 29, 2020; 7:00 p.m., ESPN+		at Cornell	W 67–58	20–7 (9–3)	Newman Arena (639); Ithaca, NY
March 6, 2020; 7:00 p.m., ESPN+		Brown	L 55–64	20–8 (9–4)	Lavietes Pavilion; Boston, MA
March 7, 2020; 7:00 p.m., ESPN+		Yale	W 83–69	21–8 (10–4)	Lavietes Pavilion; Boston, MA
Ivy League tournament
March 14, 2020; 2:00 p.m., ESPNU	(2)	(3) Princeton; Semifinals	Canceled		Lavietes Pavilion; Boston, MA
*Non-conference game. ^{#}Rankings from AP poll. (#) Tournament seedings in parentheses. All times are in Eastern.
