= Paul Atkinson (basketball) =

American basketball player

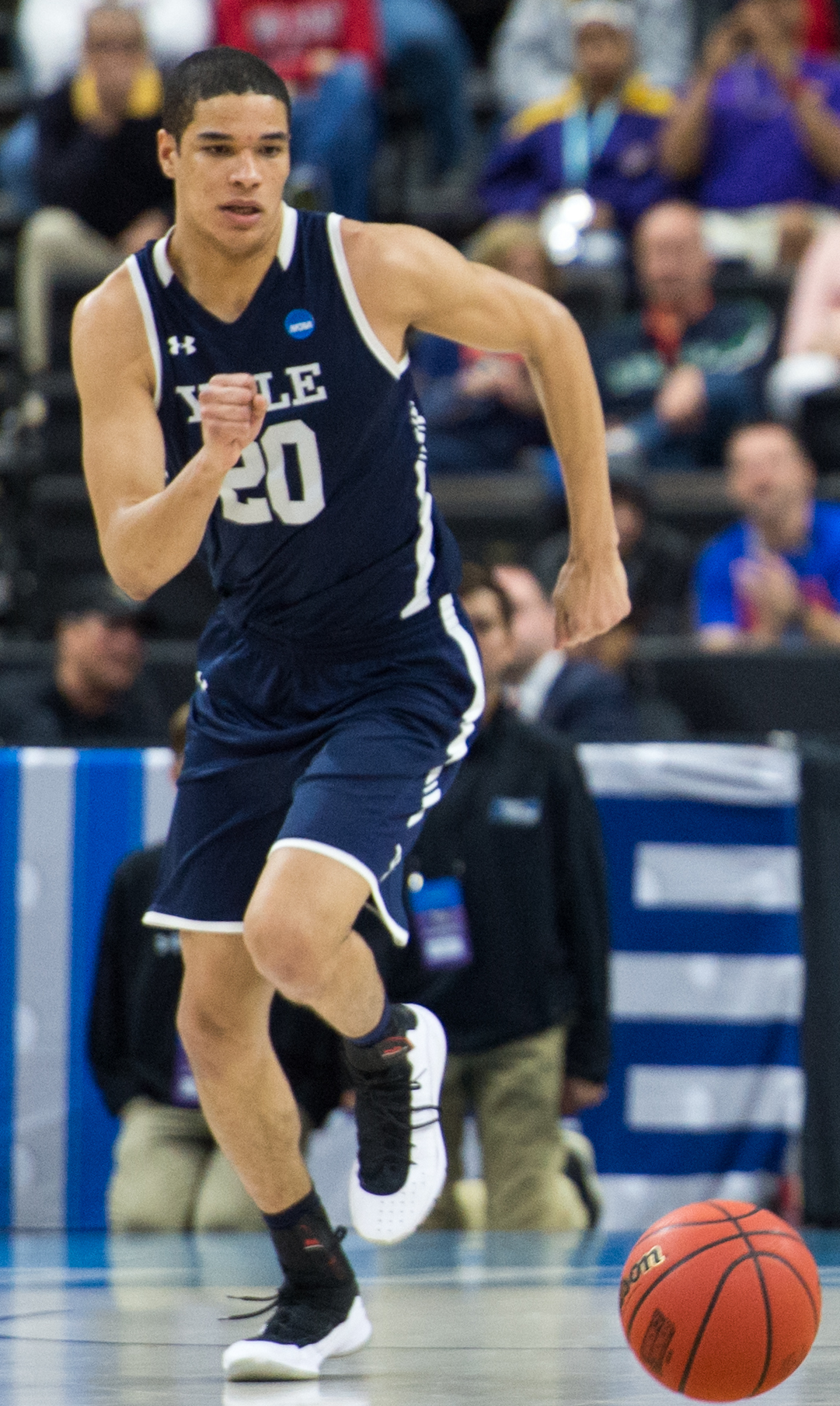
- Atkinson with Yale in 2019

Free Agent
- Position: Power forward

Personal information
- Born: March 27, 1999 (age 27) Georgia, U.S.
- Listed height: 6 ft 9 in (2.06 m)
- Listed weight: 230 lb (104 kg)

Career information
- High school: Westminster Academy (Fort Lauderdale, Florida)
- College: Yale (2017–2020); Notre Dame (2021–2022)
- NBA draft: 2022: undrafted
- Playing career: 2022–present

Career history
- 2022–2023: Atomerőmű SE
- 2023–2024: Kortrijk Spurs

Career highlights
- Ivy League Co-Player of the Year (2020); First-team All-Ivy League (2020)

Paul St. Aubyn Atkinson Jr. (born March 27, 1999) is an American professional basketball player who last played for Kortrijk Spurs of the BNXT League. He played college basketball player for the Yale Bulldogs and Notre Dame Fighting Irish.

== Early life ==
Atkinson grew up in West Palm Beach, Florida and attended the Westminster Academy in Fort Lauderdale, Florida. As a junior, he led Westminster Academy to the Class 3A state championship game, where they fell to Windermere Prep. Atkinson committed to play college basketball at Yale at the beginning of his senior year after receiving interest from Dayton, UNC-Wilmington, and Richmond. As a senior, Atkinson averaged 20.6 points, 13.1 rebounds and 3.1 assists per game and was the Sun-Sentinel South Florida Player of the Year. He had 17 points and 12 rebounds in the 3A championship game.

== College career ==
Atkinson was a starter for Yale as a true freshman and averaged 9.3 points and 4.6 rebounds per game. Atkinson was forced to play major minutes due to an injury to Jordan Bruner, and Yale coach James Jones praised Atkinson for his shot selection and accuracy, but wanted more aggressiveness from him. He mostly came off the bench as a sophomore and averaged 9.1 points and 5.0 rebounds per game. Prior to his junior season, Atkinson gained 20 pounds and worked on his athleticism. As a junior, Akinson was named the Ivy League Co-Player of the Year alongside Penn's A. J. Brodeur after averaging 17.6 points and 7.3 rebounds per game and leading the Ivy League with .630 field goal percentage during the regular season. Following the season, Atkinson declared for the 2020 NBA draft.

Atkinson entered the transfer portal after the 2020–2021 Ivy League season was canceled due to the COVID-19 pandemic. He chose to transfer to Notre Dame as a graduate transfer after considering offers from Miami (Florida), Iowa, NC State and Texas. Atkinson was named Honorable Mention All-ACC. He averaged 12.6 points, 6.9 rebounds, and 1.6 assists per game.

== Professional career ==
On July 10, 2022, Atkinson signed with Atomerőmű SE of the Nemzeti Bajnokság I/A. On July 21, 2023, after a whirlwind season with ASE, Atkinson signed with Kortrijk Spurs of the BNXT League.

== Career statistics ==
Legend
GP	Games played	GS	Games started	MPG	Minutes per game
FG%	Field goal percentage	3P%	3-point field goal percentage	FT%	Free throw percentage
RPG	Rebounds per game	APG	Assists per game	SPG	Steals per game
BPG	Blocks per game	PPG	Points per game	**Bold**	Career high

=== College ===
Year	Team	GP	GS	MPG	FG%	3P%	FT%	RPG	APG	SPG	BPG	PPG
2017–18	Yale	31	30	24.2	.692	–	.667	4.6	1.0	.7	.5	9.3
2018–19	Yale	30	1	20.2	**.697**	.000	.653	5.0	1.0	.5	.6	9.1
2019–20	Yale	30	29	**31.8**	.630	**.308**	.671	**7.3**	1.5	**1.2**	**.8**	**17.6**
2021–22	Notre Dame	**35**	**34**	27.5	.587	.000	**.750**	6.9	**1.7**	.7	.7	12.5
Career		126	94	26.0	.638	.250	.685	6.0	1.3	.7	.6	12.1

== Personal life ==
Atkinson's parents, Paul and Laura, met in Stamford, Connecticut, in high school. They moved to Georgia, where Paul Jr. was born, before returning to Stamford and finally moving to West Palm Beach.
