= 2019–20 Princeton Tigers men's basketball team =

American college basketball season

2019–20 Princeton Tigers men's basketball
- Conference: Ivy League
- Record: 14–13 (9–5 Ivy)
- Head coach: Mitch Henderson (9th season)
- Associate head coach: Brett MacConnell
- Assistant coaches: Skye Ettin; Jonathan Jones
- Home arena: Jadwin Gymnasium

2019–20 Ivy League men's basketball standings
| | Conf. | | | | Overall |
| Team | W | | L | PCT | W | | L | PCT |
|---|---|---|---|---|---|---|---|---|
| x-Yale | 11 | – | 3 | .786 | 23 | – | 7 | .767 |
| Harvard | 10 | – | 4 | .714 | 21 | – | 8 | .724 |
| Princeton | 9 | – | 5 | .643 | 14 | – | 13 | .519 |
| Penn | 8 | – | 6 | .571 | 16 | – | 11 | .593 |
| Brown | 8 | – | 6 | .571 | 15 | – | 12 | .556 |
| Dartmouth | 5 | – | 9 | .357 | 12 | – | 17 | .414 |
| Cornell | 4 | – | 10 | .286 | 7 | – | 20 | .259 |
| Columbia | 1 | – | 13 | .071 | 6 | – | 24 | .200 |
x – Ivy League champions Ivy League tournament canceled due to COVID-19 pandemic

The 2019–20 Princeton Tigers men's basketball team represented Princeton University in the 2019–20 NCAA Division I men's basketball season. The Tigers, led by 9th-year head coach Mitch Henderson, played their home games at Jadwin Gymnasium in Princeton, New Jersey as members of the Ivy League.

== Previous season ==
The Tigers finished the 2018–19 season 16–12 overall, 8–6 in Ivy League play, to finish in third place. In the Ivy League tournament, they were defeated by Yale in the semifinals.

== Offseason ==
=== Departures ===
| Name | Number | Pos. | Height | Weight | Year | Hometown | Reason for departure |
|---|---|---|---|---|---|---|---|
| Vittorio Reynoso-Avila | 1 | F | 6'5" | 200 | Junior | La Mirada, CA | Left team |
| Devin Cannady | 3 | G | 6'2" | 182 | Senior | Mishawaka, IN | Graduated |
| Elias Berbari | 11 | G | 6'2" | 185 | Senior | Greenlawn, NY | Graduated |
| Myles Stephens | 12 | G | 6'5" | 210 | Senior | Lawrenceville, NJ | Graduated |
| Noah Bramlage | 31 | F | 6'8" | 225 | Senior | Glandorf, OH | Graduated |
| Sebastian Much | 33 | F | 6'8" | 220 | Sophomore | Laguna Niguel, CA | Left team |

== Roster ==
2019–20 Princeton Tigers men's basketball team
Players
Coaches

| Pos. | # | Name | Height | Weight | Year | Hometown |
|---|---|---|---|---|---|---|
| G | 0 | Jaelin Llewellyn | 6 ft 2 in (1.88 m) | 175 lb (79 kg) | So | Mississauga, Ontario |
| G | 2 | Jose Morales | 5 ft 9 in (1.75 m) | 170 lb (77 kg) | Sr | Miramar, Florida |
| G | 3 | Ryan Langborg | 6 ft 4 in (1.93 m) | 186 lb (84 kg) | Fr | San Diego, California |
| G | 4 | Max Johns | 6 ft 4 in (1.93 m) | 195 lb (88 kg) | So | High Point, North Carolina |
| F | 5 | Drew Friberg | 6 ft 7 in (2.01 m) | 210 lb (95 kg) | So | State College, Pennsylvania |
| G | 10 | Charlie Bagin | 6 ft 1 in (1.85 m) | 170 lb (77 kg) | Jr | Glen Ridge, New Jersey |
| G | 11 | Konrad Kiszka | 6 ft 7 in (2.01 m) | 195 lb (88 kg) | Fr | Newtown, Pennsylvania |
| F | 13 | Will Gladson | 6 ft 10 in (2.08 m) | 240 lb (109 kg) | Sr | Chesterfield, Missouri |
| G | 14 | Ethan Wright | 6 ft 3 in (1.91 m) | 180 lb (82 kg) | So | Newton Centre, Massachusetts |
| G | 15 | Ryan Schwieger | 6 ft 7 in (2.01 m) | 205 lb (93 kg) | Jr | Matthews, North Carolina |
| F | 20 | Tosan Evbuomwan | 6 ft 7 in (2.01 m) | 209 lb (95 kg) | Fr | Newcastle, England |
| F | 22 | Jerome Desrosiers | 6 ft 7 in (2.01 m) | 230 lb (104 kg) | Jr | Saint-Hyacinthe, Quebec |
| F | 25 | Jacob O'Connell | 6 ft 11 in (2.11 m) | 240 lb (109 kg) | Fr | Voorhees, New Jersey |
| F | 31 | Elijah Barnes | 6 ft 7 in (2.01 m) | 215 lb (98 kg) | Jr | Middletown, New Jersey |
| F | 32 | Keeshawn Kellman | 6 ft 8 in (2.03 m) | 220 lb (100 kg) | Fr | Allentown, Pennsylvania |
| C | 34 | Richmond Aririguzoh | 6 ft 9 in (2.06 m) | 230 lb (104 kg) | Sr | Ewing, New Jersey |
| F | 35 | Colby Kyle | 6 ft 8 in (2.03 m) | 190 lb (86 kg) | So | Monroe, Washington |

Head coach

- Mitch Henderson (Princeton)

Assistant coach(es)

- Brett MacConnell (Rutgers)
- Skye Ettin (TCNJ)
- Jonathan Jones (Kean)

Legend

- (C) Team captain
- (S) Suspended
- (I) Ineligible
- (W) Walk-on
- Injured
- Current redshirt

Roster
Last update: November 10, 2019

== Schedule and results ==
| Date time, TV | Rank^{#} | Opponent^{#} | Result | Record | Site (attendance) city, state |
Non-conference regular season
| November 5, 2019*; 6:00 pm, ESPN+ | | at Duquesne | L 67–94 | 0–1 | PPG Paints Arena (2,213); Pittsburgh, PA |
| November 9, 2019*; 9:00 pm | | vs. San Francisco | L 72–82 | 0–2 | Chase Center (6,892); San Francisco, CA |
| November 13, 2019*; 7:00 pm, ESPN+ | | Lafayette | L 65–72 | 0–3 | Jadwin Gymnasium (1,298); Princeton, NJ |
| November 20, 2019*; 7:00 pm, BTN | | at Indiana | L 54–79 | 0–4 | Simon Skjodt Assembly Hall (17,222); Bloomington, IN |
| November 26, 2019*; 7:00 pm, ESPN+ | | Arizona State | L 65–67 | 0–5 | Jadwin Gymnasium (2,727); Princeton, NJ |
| November 30, 2019*; 2:00 pm, PL Network | | at Bucknell | W 87–77 | 1–5 | Sojka Pavilion (1,959); Lewisburg, PA |
| December 4, 2019*; 7:00 pm, FloSports | | at Drexel | L 76–82 | 1–6 | Daskalakis Athletic Center (1,233); Philadelphia, PA |
| December 10, 2019*; 8:00 pm, ESPN+ | | Monmouth | L 66–67 | 1–7 | Jadwin Gymnasium (1,254); Princeton, NJ |
| December 14, 2019*; 1:00 pm, NEC Front Row | | at Fairleigh Dickinson | W 80–65 | 2–7 | Rothman Center (611); Hackensack, NJ |
| December 17, 2019*; 4:30 pm | | vs. Iona; Basketball Hall of Fame Invitational | W 90–86 ^{OT} | 3–7 | Barclays Center; Brooklyn, NY |
| December 19, 2019*; 7:00 pm, ESPN+ | | Hofstra | L 72–87 | 3–8 | Jadwin Gymnasium (1,196); Princeton, NJ |
| December 29, 2019*; 4:00 pm, ESPN+ | | Lehigh | W 71–62 | 4–8 | Jadwin Gymnasium (1,927); Princeton, NJ |
Ivy League regular season
| January 4, 2020; 7:00 pm, ESPN+ | | at Penn | W 78–64 | 5–8 (1–0) | The Palestra (3,788); Philadelphia, PA |
| January 10, 2020; 5:00 pm, ESPNU | | Penn | W 63–58 | 6–8 (2–0) | Jadwin Gymnasium (3,040); Princeton, NJ |
| January 26, 2020*; 12:00 pm, ESPN+ | | Rutgers–Camden | W 87–41 | 7–8 | Jadwin Gymnasium (1,576); Princeton, NJ |
| January 31, 2020; 7:00 pm, ESPN+ | | Dartmouth | W 66–44 | 8–8 (3–0) | Jadwin Gymnasium (1,591); Princeton, NJ |
| February 1, 2020; 6:00 pm, ESPN+ | | Harvard | W 70–69 | 9–8 (4–0) | Jadwin Gymnasium (3,590); Princeton, NJ |
| February 8, 2020; 2:00 pm, ESPN+ | | at Cornell | L 62–73 | 9–9 (4–1) | Newman Arena (2,644); Ithaca, NY |
| February 9, 2020; 2:00 pm, ESPN+ | | at Columbia | W 81–74 | 10–9 (5–1) | Levien Gymnasium (1,565); New York, NY |
| February 14, 2020; 7:00 pm, ESPNews | | Yale | L 64–88 | 10–10 (5–2) | Jadwin Gymnasium (2,163); Princeton, NJ |
| February 15, 2020; 6:00 pm, ESPN+ | | Brown | W 73–54 | 11–10 (6–2) | Jadwin Gymnasium (2,464); Princeton, NJ |
| February 21, 2020; 7:00 pm, ESPN+ | | at Harvard | L 60–61 | 11–11 (6–3) | Lavietes Pavilion (1,636); Boston, MA |
| February 22, 2020; 7:00 pm, ESPN+ | | at Dartmouth | W 65–62 | 12–11 (7–3) | Leede Arena (915); Hanover, NH |
| February 28, 2020; 7:00 pm, ESPN+ | | at Brown | W 71–49 | 13–11 (8–3) | Pizzitola Sports Center (1,748); Providence, RI |
| February 29, 2020; 7:00 pm, ESPN+ | | at Yale | L 63–66 | 13–12 (8–4) | John J. Lee Amphitheater (2,066); New Haven, CT |
| March 6, 2020; 7:00 pm, ESPN+ | | Columbia | W 81-58 | 14-12 (9-4) | Jadwin Gymnasium; Princeton, NJ |
| March 7, 2020; 6:00 pm, ESPN+ | | Cornell | L 82-85 | 14-13 (9-5) | Jadwin Gymnasium; Princeton, NJ |
Ivy League Tournament
| March 14, 2020; 2:00 pm, ESPNU | (3) | (2) Harvard; Semifinals | Canceled | | Lavietes Pavilion; Boston, MA |
*Non-conference game. ^{#}Rankings from AP Poll. (#) Tournament seedings in parentheses. All times are in Eastern.
