= A. J. Brodeur =

American basketball player (born 1996)

A.J. Brodeur
Personal information
- Born: October 4, 1996 (age 30)
- Listed height: 6 ft 8 in (2.03 m)
- Listed weight: 240 lb (109 kg)

Career information
- High school: Algonquin Regional (Northborough, Massachusetts); Northfield Mount Hermon (Northfield, Massachusetts)
- College: Penn (2016–2020)
- Position: Power forward

Career history
- 2020–2021: Mitteldeutscher
- 2021: Stjarnan
- 2021–2022: Kangoeroes Mechelen

Career highlights
- Ivy League Co-Player of the Year (2020); 3× First-team All-Ivy League (2018–2020); Second-team All-Ivy League (2017); Ivy League tournament MOP (2018)

Austin James Brodeur (born October 4, 1996) is an American former basketball player. He played college basketball for the Penn Quakers and professionally in Germany, Iceland, and Belgium.

== Early life ==
Brodeur grew up in Northborough, Massachusetts and originally attended Algonquin Regional High School for two years before transferring to Northfield Mount Hermon School and played basketball and volleyball at both schools. As a sophomore at Algonquin, he averaged 17.5 points, 15.5 rebounds and 7 blocks and was named to the Telegram & Gazette Regional Super Team. He reclassified as a sophomore after transferring to Northfield-Mount Hermon. As a senior, Brodeur averaged 15.6 points, 8.7 rebounds and 3.1 assists per game and was named first team All-State by USA Today as he helped lead the Hoggers to the New England Preparatory School Athletic Council Class AAA title.

== College career ==
Brodeur became a starter for the Quakers as a true freshman and was named second team All-Ivy League after leading the team with 13.8 points and 6.8 rebounds per game. As a sophomore, he averaged 13.1 points and 7.2 rebounds per game and was named first team All-Ivy and second team All-Big 5. Brodeur helped Penn reach the NCAA Tournament. Brodeur was named the Most Outstanding Player of the 2018 Ivy League men's basketball tournament after scoring 25 points and grabbing 10 rebounds in a semifinal win against Yale and scoring 16 points with 10 rebounds in the conference championship game against Harvard. He was again named first team All-Ivy and first team All-Big 5 as a junior after averaging 17.6 points and 8.3 rebounds per game. Brodeur became Penn's All-time leading scorer, passing Ernie Beck, and career leader in blocked shots on March 7, 2020 in a 85–60 win over Columbia while also recording the first triple double in school history in a 21-point, 10 rebound, 10 assist performance. Brodeur averaged 17.3 points, 8.9 rebounds, and 5.2 assists per game as a senior and was named first team All-Ivy for as third straight season and the Ivy League Co-Player of the year alongside Paul Atkinson as well as first team All-District 13 by the National Association of Basketball Coaches. He was also named to the First Team All-Big 5. Brodeur criticized the Ivy League for cancelling its men's basketball tournament due to the COVID-19 pandemic, saying "it doesn't feel right."

== Professional career ==
On July 23, 2020, Brodeur signed with Riesen Ludwigsburg of the German Basketball Bundesliga (BBL). However, he was released on September 11 as he did not pass the physical.

On October 14, 2020, he has signed a two-month contract, with the option to extend until the end of the season, with Mitteldeutscher of the Basketball Bundesliga.

In January 2021, Brodeur signed with Stjarnan of the Icelandic Úrvalsdeild karla. During the regular season, he averaged 13.6 points and 7.6 rebounds per game. He helped Stjarnan to the semi-finals in the playoffs where it was eventually knocked out by Þór Þorlákshöfn. In 10 playoff games, he averaged 11.8 points and 7.1 rebounds per game.

In May 2021, Brodeur signed with Belgian club Kangoeroes Mechelen for the 2021–22 BNXT League season.

== Career statistics ==
Legend
GP	Games played	GS	Games started	MPG	Minutes per game
FG%	Field goal percentage	3P%	3-point field goal percentage	FT%	Free throw percentage
RPG	Rebounds per game	APG	Assists per game	SPG	Steals per game
BPG	Blocks per game	PPG	Points per game	**Bold**	Career high

=== College ===
Year	Team	GP	GS	MPG	FG%	3P%	FT%	RPG	APG	SPG	BPG	PPG
2016–17	Penn	28	28	30.9	.526	**.421**	.607	6.9	1.9	1.0	**2.4**	13.8
2017–18	Penn	**33**	**33**	31.0	**.538**	.286	.611	7.2	2.5	.9	1.2	13.1
2018–19	Penn	31	31	32.5	.528	.340	.576	8.3	3.6	1.0	1.3	**17.6**
2019–20	Penn	27	27	**34.6**	.504	.274	**.716**	**8.9**	**5.2**	**1.1**	1.8	17.3
Career		119	119	32.2	.524	.308	.625	7.8	3.3	1.0	1.6	15.4
