= 2019–20 Yale Bulldogs men's basketball team =

American college basketball season

2019–20 Yale Bulldogs men's basketball

Ivy League regular season champions
- Conference: Ivy League
- Record: 23–7 (11–3 Ivy)
- Head coach: James Jones (21st season)
- Associate head coach: Matt Kingsley
- Assistant coaches: Justin Simon; Tobe Carberry
- Home arena: John J. Lee Amphitheater

2019–20 Ivy League men's basketball standings
	Conf.				Overall
Team	W		L	PCT	W		L	PCT
x-Yale	11	–	3	.786	23	–	7	.767
Harvard	10	–	4	.714	21	–	8	.724
Princeton	9	–	5	.643	14	–	13	.519
Penn	8	–	6	.571	16	–	11	.593
Brown	8	–	6	.571	15	–	12	.556
Dartmouth	5	–	9	.357	12	–	17	.414
Cornell	4	–	10	.286	7	–	20	.259
Columbia	1	–	13	.071	6	–	24	.200
x – Ivy League champions Ivy League tournament canceled due to COVID-19 pandemic

The 2019–20 Yale Bulldogs men's basketball team represent Yale University in the 2019–20 NCAA Division I men's basketball season. The Bulldogs, led by 21st-year head coach James Jones, play their home games at John J. Lee Amphitheater of the Payne Whitney Gymnasium in New Haven, Connecticut as members of the Ivy League. The Bulldogs earned the league's automatic berth to the NCAA tournament by being the regular season conference champions, after it was announced on March 10, 2020 that the Ivy League tournament was canceled due to the COVID-19 pandemic.

== Previous season ==
The Bulldogs finished the 2018–19 season 22–8 overall, 10–4 in Ivy League play, finishing as co-regular season champions, alongside Harvard. In the Ivy League tournament, they defeated Princeton in the semifinals, before defeating Harvard in the championship game, earning the Ivy League's automatic bid into the NCAA tournament. As the 14 seed in the East Region, they were defeated in the first round by 3rd-seeded LSU.

== Roster ==
2019–20 Yale Bulldogs men's basketball team
Players
Coaches

Pos.	#	Name	Height	Weight	Year	Hometown
G	0	Jalen Gabbidon	6 ft 5 in (1.96 m)	190 lb (86 kg)	Jr	Harrisburg, Pennsylvania
G	1	Eze Dike	6 ft 2 in (1.88 m)	195 lb (88 kg)	So	Montreal, Quebec
G	2	Eric Monroe	6 ft 2 in (1.88 m)	175 lb (79 kg)	Sr	San Diego, California
G	3	August Mahoney	6 ft 4 in (1.93 m)	190 lb (86 kg)	Fr	Saratoga Springs, New York
G	5	Azar Swain	6 ft 0 in (1.83 m)	185 lb (84 kg)	Jr	Brockton, Massachusetts
G	10	Matthue Cotton	6 ft 5 in (1.96 m)	200 lb (91 kg)	So	Voorhees, New Jersey
G	11	Michael Feinberg	6 ft 4 in (1.93 m)	195 lb (88 kg)	So	Hidden Hills, California
F	14	Jameel Alausa	6 ft 7 in (2.01 m)	210 lb (95 kg)	Jr	Chicago, Illinois
F	15	EJ Jarvis	6 ft 8 in (2.03 m)	220 lb (100 kg)	Fr	Washington, D.C.
F	20	Paul Atkinson	6 ft 10 in (2.08 m)	220 lb (100 kg)	Jr	West Palm Beach, Florida
F	22	Austin Williams	6 ft 8 in (2.03 m)	235 lb (107 kg)	Sr	Jacksonville, Florida
F	23	Jordan Bruner	6 ft 9 in (2.06 m)	205 lb (93 kg)	Sr	Columbia, South Carolina
F	30	Jake Lanford	6 ft 10 in (2.08 m)	230 lb (104 kg)	So	Charleston, South Carolina
F	33	Wyatt Yess	6 ft 8 in (2.03 m)	220 lb (100 kg)	Jr	St. Louis, Missouri
F	35	Isaiah Kelly	6 ft 7 in (2.01 m)	215 lb (98 kg)	So	Augusta, Georgia

Head coach

- James Jones (Albany)

Assistant coach(es)

- Matt Kingsley (Wesleyan)
- Justin Simon (Yale)
- Tobe Carberry (Vermont)

Legend

- (C) Team captain
- (S) Suspended
- (I) Ineligible
- (W) Walk-on
- Injured
- Current redshirt

Roster
Last update: November 11, 2019

== Schedule and results ==
Date time, TV	Rank^{#}	Opponent^{#}	Result	Record	Site (attendance) city, state
Non-conference regular season
November 5, 2019*; 7:00 pm, SNY		at Stony Brook	W 74–69 ^{OT}	1–0	Island Federal Credit Union Arena (3,183); Stony Brook, NY
November 8, 2019*; 7:00 pm, ESPN+		Oberlin	W 94–37	2–0	John J. Lee Amphitheater (642); New Haven, CT
November 11, 2019*; 9:00 pm		at San Francisco	L 79–84 ^{OT}	2–1	War Memorial Gymnasium (1,727); San Francisco, CA
November 17, 2019*; 2:30 pm, ESPN+		at Oklahoma State; NIT Season Tip-Off campus-site game	L 57–64	2–2	Gallagher-Iba Arena (7,260); Stillwater, OK
November 20, 2019*; 7:00 pm, ESPN+		Siena	W 100–89 ^{3OT}	3–2	John J. Lee Amphitheater (746); New Haven, CT
November 23, 2019*; 4:00:00 pm, BTN Plus		at Penn State; NIT Season Tip-Off campus-site game	L 56–58	3–3	Bryce Jordan Center (6,091); University Park, PA
November 25, 2019*; 12:00 pm, ESPNU		vs. Western Michigan; NIT Season Tip-Off Orlando Bracket	W 73–51	4–3	HP Field House (250); Orlando, FL
November 26, 2019*; 2:00 pm, ESPNU		vs. Bucknell; NIT Season Tip-Off Orlando Bracket Championship Game	W 81–61	5–3	HP Field House (250); Orlando, FL
December 1, 2019*; 3:00 pm, NESN/ESPN+		Vermont	W 65–52	6–3	John J. Lee Amphitheater (812); New Haven, CT
December 4, 2019*; 7:30 pm		at Albany	W 61–52	7–3	SEFCU Arena (2,337); Albany, NY
December 7, 2019*; 7:00 pm		at Lehigh	W 78–65	8–3	Stabler Arena (818); Bethlehem, PA
December 11, 2019*; 7:00 pm, NESN		at UMass	W 83–80 ^{OT}	9–3	Mullins Center (2,212); Amherst, MA
December 22, 2019*; 3:00 pm, ACCN		at Clemson	W 54–45	10–3	Littlejohn Coliseum (5,632); Clemson, SC
December 30, 2019*; 7:00 pm, ACCN		at North Carolina	L 67–70	10–4	Dean Smith Center (20,765); Chapel Hill, NC
January 12, 2020*; 2:00 pm, ESPN+		Johnson & Wales	W 108–58	11–4	John J. Lee Amphitheater (787); New Haven, CT
Ivy League regular season
January 17, 2020; 7:30 pm, ESPN+		Brown	W 70–56	12–4 (1–0)	John J. Lee Amphitheater (1,584); New Haven, CT
January 20, 2020*; 12:00 pm, ESPN+		at Howard	W 89–75	13–4	Burr Gymnasium (2,097); Washington, D.C.
January 24, 2020; 7:00 pm, ESPNU		at Brown	W 73–62	14–4 (2–0)	Pizzitola Sports Center (2,575); Providence, RI
January 31, 2020; 7:00 pm, ESPN+		Columbia	W 93–62	15–4 (3–0)	John J. Lee Amphitheater (1,594); New Haven, CT
February 1, 2020; 7:00 pm, ESPN+		Cornell	W 86–71	16–4 (4–0)	John J. Lee Amphitheater (1,506); New Haven, CT
February 7, 2020; 5:00 pm, ESPNU		Harvard	L 77–78	16–5 (4–1)	John J. Lee Amphitheater (2,706); New Haven, CT
February 8, 2020; 7:00 pm, ESPN+		Dartmouth	W 75–57	17–5 (5–1)	John J. Lee Amphitheater (1,524); New Haven, CT
February 14, 2020; 7:00 pm, ESPNews		at Princeton	W 88–64	18–5 (6–1)	Jadwin Gymnasium (2,163); Princeton, NJ
February 15, 2020; 6:00 pm, ESPN+		at Penn	L 61–69	18–6 (6–2)	The Palestra (3,856); Philadelphia, PA
February 21, 2020; 7:00 pm, ESPN+		at Cornell	W 81–80 ^{2OT}	19–6 (7–2)	Newman Arena (631); Ithaca, NY
February 22, 2020; 7:00 pm, SNY/ESPN+		at Columbia	W 83–65	20–6 (8–2)	Levien Gymnasium (2,065); New York, NY
February 28, 2020; 7:00 pm, ESPN+		Penn	W 76–73	21–6 (9–2)	John J. Lee Amphitheater (2,106); New Haven, CT
February 29, 2020; 7:00 pm, ESPN+		Princeton	W 66–63	22–6 (10–2)	John J. Lee Amphitheater (2,066); New Haven, CT
March 6, 2020; 7:00 pm, ESPN+		at Dartmouth	W 72–61	23–6 (11–2)	Leede Arena; Hanover, NH
March 7, 2020; 7:00 pm, ESPN+		at Harvard	L 69–83	23–7 (11–3)	Lavietes Pavilion; Boston, MA
Ivy League tournament
March 14, 2020; 11:00 am, ESPNU	(1)	(4) Penn; Semifinals	Canceled		Lavietes Pavilion; Boston, MA
NCAA Tournament
March 19/20, 2020*; TBD		vs. TBD; First Round			
*Non-conference game. ^{#}Rankings from AP Poll. (#) Tournament seedings in parentheses. All times are in Eastern.
