= 2019–20 Penn Quakers men's basketball team =

American college basketball season

2019–20 Penn Quakers men's basketball
- Conference: Ivy League
- Record: 16–11 (8–6 Ivy)
- Head coach: Steve Donahue (5th season)
- Associate head coach: Nat Graham
- Assistant coaches: Joe Mihalich; Trey Montgomery
- Home arena: The Palestra

2019–20 Ivy League men's basketball standings
	Conf.				Overall
Team	W		L	PCT	W		L	PCT
x-Yale	11	–	3	.786	23	–	7	.767
Harvard	10	–	4	.714	21	–	8	.724
Princeton	9	–	5	.643	14	–	13	.519
Penn	8	–	6	.571	16	–	11	.593
Brown	8	–	6	.571	15	–	12	.556
Dartmouth	5	–	9	.357	12	–	17	.414
Cornell	4	–	10	.286	7	–	20	.259
Columbia	1	–	13	.071	6	–	24	.200
x – Ivy League champions Ivy League tournament canceled due to COVID-19 pandemic

The 2019–20 Penn Quakers men's basketball team represent the University of Pennsylvania in the 2019–20 NCAA Division I men's basketball season. The Quakers, led by fifth-year head coach Steve Donahue, play their home games at The Palestra in Philadelphia, Pennsylvania as members of the Ivy League.

== Previous season ==
The Quakers finished the 2018–19 season 19–12 overall, 7–7 in Ivy League play, to finish in a three-way tie for fourth. They qualified for the Ivy League tournament due to winning the tiebreaker, where they were defeated by Harvard in the semifinals.

== Roster ==
2019–20 Penn Quakers men's basketball team
Players
Coaches

Pos.	#	Name	Height	Weight	Year	Hometown
G	00	Ryan Betley	6 ft 5 in (1.96 m)	200 lb (91 kg)	Sr	Downingtown, PA
G	1	Ray Jerome	6 ft 2 in (1.88 m)	190 lb (86 kg)	Sr	Latham, NY
G	2	Jonah Charles	6 ft 4 in (1.93 m)	180 lb (82 kg)	Fr	Roselle, NJ
G	3	Jordan Dingle	6 ft 3 in (1.91 m)	200 lb (91 kg)	Fr	Valley Stream, NY
C	4	Max Lorca-Lloyd	6 ft 9 in (2.06 m)	210 lb (95 kg)	Fr	Melbourne, FL
G	5	Jelani Williams	6 ft 5 in (1.96 m)	195 lb (88 kg)	Jr	Washington, D.C.
G	10	Alex Imegwu	6 ft 6 in (1.98 m)	205 lb (93 kg)	So	Short Hills, NJ
G	11	Lucas Monroe	6 ft 6 in (1.98 m)	200 lb (91 kg)	Fr	Huntingdon Valley, PA
G	12	Devon Goodman	6 ft 0 in (1.83 m)	170 lb (77 kg)	Sr	Laverock, PA
G	13	Eddie Scott	6 ft 6 in (1.98 m)	200 lb (91 kg)	Jr	Bowie, MD
F	14	Max Martz	6 ft 6 in (1.98 m)	210 lb (95 kg)	Fr	Upper Arlington, OH
G	21	Bryce Washington	6 ft 4 in (1.93 m)	180 lb (82 kg)	So	Southfield, MI
F	22	Kuba Mijakowski	6 ft 7 in (2.01 m)	230 lb (104 kg)	Sr	Warsaw, Poland
F	23	Michael Wang	6 ft 10 in (2.08 m)	220 lb (100 kg)	So	Taiyuan, China
F	24	Jarrod Simmons	6 ft 8 in (2.03 m)	220 lb (100 kg)	Jr	Crescent, PA
F	25	A. J. Brodeur	6 ft 8 in (2.03 m)	240 lb (109 kg)	Sr	Northborough, MA
G	34	Griffin Ryan	6 ft 5 in (1.96 m)	215 lb (98 kg)	So	Winnetka, IL
C	35	Mark Jackson	7 ft 3 in (2.21 m)	260 lb (118 kg)	Jr	Salt Lake City, UT

Head coach

- Steve Donahue (Ursinus)

Assistant coach(es)

- Nat Graham (Penn)
- Joe Mihalich (Nazareth)
- Trey Montgomery (Samford)

Legend

- (C) Team captain
- (S) Suspended
- (I) Ineligible
- (W) Walk-on
- Injured
- Current redshirt

Roster
Last update: April 4, 2024

== Schedule and results ==
Date time, TV	Rank^{#}	Opponent^{#}	Result	Record	Site (attendance) city, state
Non-conference regular season
November 5, 2019*; 8:00 pm, SECN+		at Alabama	W 81–80	1–0	Coleman Coliseum (11,223); Tuscaloosa, AL
November 9, 2019*; 4:30 pm, C-USATV		at Rice	L 61–80	1–1	Tudor Fieldhouse (1,557); Houston, TX
November 13, 2019*; 7:00 pm, ESPN+		La Salle; Philadelphia Big 5	W 75–59	2–1	The Palestra (2,426); Philadelphia, PA
November 19, 2019*; 7:00 pm, PL Network		at Lafayette	L 75–86	2–2	Kirby Sports Center (1,366); Easton, PA
November 23, 2019*; 2:30 pm, FS2		at Providence	W 81–75	3–2	Dunkin' Donuts Center (10,649); Providence, RI
November 28, 2019*; 8:30 pm, ESPNU		vs. UCF; Wooden Legacy quarterfinals	W 68–67	4–2	Anaheim Arena (1,574); Anaheim, CA
November 29, 2019*; 11:30 pm, ESPN2		vs. No. 14 Arizona; Wooden Legacy semifinals	L 82–92	4–3	Anaheim Arena (2,605); Anaheim, CA
December 1, 2019*; 1:30 pm, ESPN2		vs. Long Beach State; Wooden Legacy 3rd-place game	W 95–79	5–3	Anaheim Arena; Anaheim, CA
December 4, 2019*; 6:30 pm, FS1		at No. 23 Villanova; Philadelphia Big 5	L 69–80	5–4	Finneran Pavilion (6,501); Villanova, PA
December 21, 2019*; 1:00 pm, ESPN+		Widener	W 105–57	6–4	The Palestra (2,117); Philadelphia, PA
December 30, 2019*; 7:00 pm		at Howard	W 81–62	7–4	Burr Gymnasium (659); Washington, D.C.
Ivy League regular season
January 4, 2020; 7:00 pm, ESPN+		Princeton	L 64–78	7–5 (0–1)	The Palestra (3,788); Philadelphia, PA
January 10, 2020; 5:00 pm, ESPNU		at Princeton	L 58–63	7–6 (0–2)	Jadwin Gymnasium (3,040); Princeton, NJ
January 18, 2020*; 2:00 pm, NBCS PHI/ESPN+		Saint Joseph's; Philadelphia Big 5	L 81–87	7–7 (0–2)	The Palestra (6,266); Philadelphia, PA
January 25, 2020*; 2:00 pm, NBCS PHI/ESPN+		Temple; Philadelphia Big 5	W 66–59	8–7 (0–2)	The Palestra (6,524); Philadelphia, PA
January 31, 2020; 5:00 pm, ESPNU		Harvard	W 75–72 ^{OT}	9–7 (1–2)	The Palestra (3,146); Philadelphia, PA
February 1, 2020; 6:00 pm, ESPN+		Dartmouth	W 54–46	10–7 (2–2)	The Palestra (3,017); Philadelphia, PA
February 8, 2020; 2:00 pm, ESPN+		at Columbia	W 76–67	11–7 (3–2)	Levien Gymnasium (1,855); New York, NY
February 9, 2020; 2:00 pm, ESPN+		at Cornell	W 79–73	12–7 (4–2)	Newman Arena (889); Ithaca, NY
February 14, 2020; 7:00 pm, ESPN+		Brown	L 63–75	12–8 (4–3)	The Palestra (2,454); Philadelphia, PA
February 15, 2020; 6:00 pm, ESPN+		Yale	W 69–61	13–8 (5–3)	The Palestra (3,856); Philadelphia, PA
February 21, 2020; 7:00 pm, ESPN+		at Dartmouth	L 59–66	13–9 (5–4)	Leede Arena (631); Hanover, NH
February 22, 2020; 7:00 pm, ESPN+		at Harvard	L 65–69	13–10 (5–5)	Lavietes Pavilion (1,636); Boston, MA
February 28, 2020; 7:00 pm, ESPN+		at Yale	L 73–76	13–11 (5–6)	John J. Lee Amphitheater (2,106); New Haven, CT
February 29, 2020; 6:00 pm, ESPN+		at Brown	W 73–68	14–11 (6–6)	Pizzitola Sports Center; Providence, RI
March 6, 2020; 7:00 pm, ESPN+		Cornell	W 78–64	15–11 (7–6)	The Palestra; Philadelphia, PA
March 7, 2020; 6:00 pm, ESPN+		Columbia	W 85–65	16–11 (8–6)	The Palestra; Philadelphia, PA
Ivy League tournament
March 14, 2020; 11:00 am, ESPNU	(4)	(1) Yale; Semifinals	Canceled		Lavietes Pavilion; Boston, MA
*Non-conference game. ^{#}Rankings from AP poll. (#) Tournament seedings in parentheses. All times are in Eastern.
