= 2019–20 Dartmouth Big Green men's basketball team =

American college basketball season

2019–20 Dartmouth Big Green men's basketball
- Conference: Ivy League
- Record: 12–17 (5–9 Ivy)
- Head coach: David McLaughlin (4th season)
- Assistant coaches: Justin Bradley; Steve Ongley; Will Thoni
- Home arena: Leede Arena

2019–20 Ivy League men's basketball standings
	Conf.				Overall
Team	W		L	PCT	W		L	PCT
x-Yale	11	–	3	.786	23	–	7	.767
Harvard	10	–	4	.714	21	–	8	.724
Princeton	9	–	5	.643	14	–	13	.519
Penn	8	–	6	.571	16	–	11	.593
Brown	8	–	6	.571	15	–	12	.556
Dartmouth	5	–	9	.357	12	–	17	.414
Cornell	4	–	10	.286	7	–	20	.259
Columbia	1	–	13	.071	6	–	24	.200
x – Ivy League champions Ivy League tournament canceled due to COVID-19 pandemic

The 2019–20 Dartmouth Big Green men's basketball team represented Dartmouth College in the 2019–20 NCAA Division I men's basketball season. The Big Green, led by fourth-year head coach David McLaughlin, played their home games at Leede Arena in Hanover, New Hampshire as members of the Ivy League. They finished the season 12–17, 5–9 in Ivy League play to finish in sixth place. They failed to qualify for the Ivy League tournament, although the tournament was ultimately cancelled due to the COVID-19 pandemic.

== Previous season ==
The Big Green finished the 2018–19 season 11–19 overall, 2–12 in Ivy League play, to finish in eighth place, failing to qualify for the Ivy League tournament.

== Roster ==
2019–20 Dartmouth Big Green men's basketball team
Players
Coaches

Pos.	#	Name	Height	Weight	Year	Hometown
G	0	Jayden Reaves	6 ft 0 in (1.83 m)	185 lb (84 kg)	Fr	New York, New York
G	1	Taurus Samuels	6 ft 0 in (1.83 m)	175 lb (79 kg)	So	Oceanside, California
G	2	Isaac Letoa	6 ft 1 in (1.85 m)	180 lb (82 kg)	Jr	Auckland, New Zealand
F	3	Ian Carter	6 ft 7 in (2.01 m)	220 lb (100 kg)	Sr	Los Angeles, California
G	4	Trevon Ary-Turner	6 ft 3 in (1.91 m)	185 lb (84 kg)	So	Issaquah, Washington
G	5	Ian Sistare	6 ft 3 in (1.91 m)	200 lb (91 kg)	Sr	Dublin, New Hampshire
G	10	James Foye	6 ft 4 in (1.93 m)	195 lb (88 kg)	Sr	Hamilton, Massachusetts
G	11	Wes Slajchert	6 ft 5 in (1.96 m)	185 lb (84 kg)	So	Oak Park, California
F	12	Paul Hudson	6 ft 5 in (1.96 m)	225 lb (102 kg)	Fr	Charlotte, North Carolina
G	14	Jackson Blaufeld	6 ft 4 in (1.93 m)	200 lb (91 kg)	Fr	Pittsburgh, Pennsylvania
G	15	Brendan Barry	6 ft 2 in (1.88 m)	180 lb (82 kg)	Sr	Fair Haven, New Jersey
G	20	Ben Swett	6 ft 1 in (1.85 m)	175 lb (79 kg)	Jr	Exeter, New Hampshire
G/F	21	Aaryn Rai	6 ft 6 in (1.98 m)	205 lb (93 kg)	Jr	Markham, Ontario
F	22	Garrison Wade	6 ft 6 in (1.98 m)	200 lb (91 kg)	So	Madison, Mississippi
F	23	Chris Knight	6 ft 7 in (2.01 m)	225 lb (102 kg)	Jr	Madison, Wisconsin
F	24	Cam Krystkowiak	6 ft 9 in (2.06 m)	210 lb (95 kg)	Fr	Salt Lake City, Utah
F	32	Demi Adelekun	6 ft 8 in (2.03 m)	230 lb (104 kg)	Fr	Gastonia, North Carolina
F	33	Nate Ogbu	6 ft 7 in (2.01 m)	210 lb (95 kg)	Fr	Stone Mountain, Georgia

Head coach

- David McLaughlin (Colby)

Assistant coach(es)

- Justin Bradley (Guilford)
- Steve Ongley (Southern Connecticut)
- Will Thoni (Davidson)

Legend

- (C) Team captain
- (S) Suspended
- (I) Ineligible
- (W) Walk-on
- Injured
- Current redshirt

Roster
Last update: November 6, 2019

== Schedule and results ==
Date time, TV	Opponent	Result	Record	Site (attendance) city, state
Non-conference regular season
November 8, 2019*; 7:00 pm, ESPN+	at Buffalo	W 68–63	1–0	Alumni Arena (3,376); Amherst, NY
November 11, 2019*; 7:00 pm, NESNPlus	Florida Gulf Coast	W 55–49	2–0	Leede Arena (915); Hanover, NH
November 15, 2019*; 4:30 pm	vs. Merrimack; River Hawk Invitational	W 55–46	3–0	Costello Athletic Center (1,166); Lowell, MA
November 16, 2019*; 1:30 pm	vs. Jacksonville; River Hawk Invitational	L 37–57	3–1	Costello Athletic Center (696); Lowell, MA
November 17, 2019*; 3:30 pm, 534	at UMass Lowell; River Hawk Invitational	W 80–75 ^{OT}	4–1	Costello Athletic Center (534); Lowell, MA
November 19, 2019*; 7:00 pm, ESPN+	Thomas	W 108–59	5–1	Leede Arena (357); Hanover, NH
November 30, 2019*; 4:00 pm	at Bowling Green	L 69–76	5–2	Stroh Center (1,192); Bowling Green, OH
December 3, 2019*; 7:00 pm	at Georgia State	L 80–83	5–3	GSU Sports Arena (1,340); Atlanta, GA
December 6, 2019*; 8:00 pm	at South Florida	L 44–63	5–4	Yuengling Center (4,732); Tampa, FL
December 11, 2019*; 7:00 pm, ESPN+	at Maine	W 77–44	6–4	Cross Insurance Center (748); Bangor, ME
December 14, 2019*; 1:05 pm	at Boston University	L 76–78	6–5	Case Gym (691); Boston, MA
December 18, 2019*; 11:00 am, NESN	Central Connecticut	W 76–60	7–5	Leede Arena (1,007); Hanover, NH
December 21, 2019*; 12:00 pm, ESPN+	Bryant	L 60–64	7–6	Leede Arena (609); Hanover, NH
December 30, 2019*; 2:00 pm, ESPN+	at New Hampshire	L 56–70	7–7	Lundholm Gym (438); Durham, NH
January 2, 2020*; 7:00 pm, ESPN+	Vermont	L 68–77	7–8	Leede Arena (1,800); Hanover, NH
Ivy League regular season
January 18, 2020; 2:00 pm, ESPN+	at Harvard	L 62–67	7–9 (0–1)	Lavietes Pavilion (1,349); Boston, MA
January 25, 2020; 7:00 pm, ESPN+	Harvard	L 66–70	7–10 (0–2)	Leede Arena (1,564); Hanover, NH
January 31, 2020; 7:00 pm, ESPN+	at Princeton	L 44–66	7–11 (0–3)	Jadwin Gymnasium (1,591); Princeton, NJ
February 1, 2020; 6:00 pm, ESPN+	at Penn	L 46–54	7–12 (0–4)	The Palestra (3,017); Philadelphia, PA
February 7, 2020; 7:00 pm, ESPN+	at Brown	L 65–67	7–13 (0–5)	Pizzitola Sports Center (1,106); Providence, RI
February 8, 2020; 7:00 pm, ESPN+	at Yale	L 57–75	7–14 (0–6)	John J. Lee Amphitheater (1,524); New Haven, CT
February 14, 2020; 7:00 pm, ESPN+	Columbia	W 65–63	8–14 (1–6)	Leede Arena (633); Hanover, NH
February 15, 2020; 7:00 pm, ESPN+	Cornell	W 75–53	9–14 (2–6)	Leede Arena (525); Hanover, NH
February 21, 2020; 7:00 pm, ESPN+	Penn	W 66–59	10–14 (3–6)	Leede Arena (631); Hanover, NH
February 22, 2020; 7:00 pm, ESPN+	Princeton	L 62–65	10–15 (3–7)	Leede Arena (915); Hanover, NH
February 28, 2020; 7:00 pm, ESPN+	at Cornell	W 82–70	11–15 (4–7)	Newman Arena (405); Ithaca, NY
February 29, 2020; 7:00 pm, ESPN+	at Columbia	W 76–57	12–15 (5–7)	Levien Gymnasium (1,492); New York, NY
March 6, 2020; 7:00 pm, ESPN+	Yale	L 61–72	12–16 (5–8)	Leede Arena (558); Hanover, NH
March 7, 2020; 7:00 pm, ESPN+	Brown	L 58–70	12–17 (5–9)	Leede Arena (647); Hanover, NH
*Non-conference game. ^{#}Rankings from AP Poll. (#) Tournament seedings in parentheses. All times are in Eastern.
