= Spencer Freedman =

American college basketball player

Personal information
- Born: June 24, 1998 (age 28) Pacific Palisades, California, U.S.
- Listed height: 6 ft 0 in (1.83 m)
- Listed weight: 170 lb (77 kg)

Career information
- High school: Santa Monica (Santa Monica, California); Mater Dei (Santa Ana, California)
- College: Harvard (2018–2022) New York University (2023-2024)
- Position: Point guard / shooting guard
- Number: 13

Spencer Freedman (born June 24, 1998) is an American former college basketball player for the NYU Violets of the University Athletic Association and the Harvard Crimson of the Ivy League. He attended Mater Dei High School in Santa Ana, California, where he was ranked among the top players in California. Freedman first competed with Santa Monica High School in his native Santa Monica, California.

== Early and personal life ==
Freedman was born in Pacific Palisades, Los Angeles, and is Jewish; his father is Bryan Freedman, a lawyer who had studied at the University of California, Berkeley. Spencer first played basketball at age 7 and started training regularly one year later. In his junior year at Mater Dei, Freedman had a 4.3 grade point average (GPA) and drew attention from several Ivy League schools for his academic success. While in high school, he had plans to major in business, political science, or law.

== High school career ==
Freedman played his freshman season at Santa Monica High School in Santa Monica, California. He joined the team as one of the top incoming freshman point guards, having drawn local attention at basketball camps and competitions in eighth grade.

In his high school debut on June 12, 2014, Freedman scored 31 points, missing only two shots, in a win over Notre Dame High School. He notched 25 points in the following game. On January 24, 2015, he scored 17 points as his team was defeated by Las Vegas High School.

In June 2015, Freedman left Santa Monica to transfer to Mater Dei High School in Santa Ana, California. According to his father, he made the move for academic reasons. By the beginning of his Mater Dei career, he held college offers from the Cal State Northridge Matadors, Rice Owls, UC Santa Barbara Gauchos, and USC Trojans. On February 26, 2016, in a 54–102 loss to Chino Hills High School, Freedman scored 10 points. By the end of the season, he earned first-team All-County honors from the Orange County Register. His team was ranked among the top 25 in the nation by USA Today High School Sports.

In January 2017, in a win over Santa Margarita Catholic High School, Freedman posted 18 points and five assists for Mater Dei. He led his team to a Trinity League title and an appearance at the CIF Southern Section Open Division Finals. At the end of the season, he was named most valuable player of the Trinity League.

=== Recruiting ===
On June 9, Freedman committed to play college basketball for the Harvard Crimson. He said, "No matter what, eventually the ball is going to stop bouncing and basketball will be over for everyone so I know college is not a four-year decision but a lifetime decision. By choosing Harvard, I'm getting an education that will set me up for a future past basketball."

College recruiting
Name	Hometown	School	Height	Weight	Commit date
Spencer Freedman; PG	Pacific Palisades, CA	Mater Dei (CA)	5 ft 11 in (1.80 m)	155 lb (70 kg)	Jun 9, 2017
Spencer Freedman; PG	Recruit ratings: Rivals: 247Sports: ESPN: (80)				
Overall recruit ranking: Rivals: – 247Sports: 162 ESPN: –
Note: In many cases, Scout, Rivals, 247Sports, On3, and ESPN may conflict in their listings of height and weight.; In these cases, the average was taken. ESPN grades are on a 100-point scale.; Sources: "Harvard 2018 Basketball Commitments". Rivals.; "2018 Harvard Crimson Recruiting Class". ESPN.; "2018 Team Ranking". Rivals.

== College career ==
=== Harvard ===
Freedman made his debut for Harvard on November 6, 2018, scoring six points in a 78–66 win over MIT. Over the course of his Harvard career he played in 32 games while starting in three. Freedman totaled 81 points, 28 assists, and 20 rebounds while shooting 30.6% from beyond the arc.

=== NYU ===
After his career at Harvard he decided to pursue a graduate degree in Management and Systems (School of Professional Studies) at New York University (NYU). At NYU, after averaging 17.2 points and 5.6 assists in 2022–23, in 2023-24 he averaged 18.4 points (third in the University Athletic Association (UAA)) and 5.8 assists (10th in Division III) per game, his 77 three-pointers tied for first in the UAA, as he was second in three-point percentage (41.6) and third in field-goal percentage (49.3). He led the Violets to the DIII NCAA Tournament due to an at-large bid and being named to 1st Team All-Conference in the UAA. He was named the Region 4 Player of the Year and First Team All-Region 4 by D3hoops.com and Third Team All-America by the National Association of Basketball Coaches (NABC).

== Maccabiah Games ==
Freedman played on the gold medal-winning Team USA basketball team at the 2019 European Maccabiah held in Budapest, Hungary, where the team defeated Team Russia in the final.

== Career statistics ==
Legend
GP	Games played	GS	Games started	MPG	Minutes per game
FG%	Field goal percentage	3P%	3-point field goal percentage	FT%	Free throw percentage
RPG	Rebounds per game	APG	Assists per game	SPG	Steals per game
BPG	Blocks per game	PPG	Points per game	**Bold**	Career high

=== Harvard DI ===
Year	Team	GP	GS	MPG	FG%	3P%	FT%	RPG	APG	SPG	BPG	PPG—Total Points
2018–19	Harvard	**16**	**2**	**12.1**	**.310**	**.333**	**1.000**	**.5**	**1.2**	**.1**	.0	**2.8** -- 44
2019–20	Harvard	16	1	7.9	.40	26.9	.50	.8	.6	.2	0	2.3 -- 37
Career		32	3	10.0	.35	.30	.80	.6	.9	.2	.0	2.5 -- 81

=== New York University DIII ===
Year	Team	GP	GS	MPG	FG%	3P%	FT%	RPG	APG	SPG	BPG	PPG—Total Points
2023	NYU	**26**	**26**	**32.3**	**53.4**	**50.4**	**83.7**	**2.5**	**5.6**	**1.2**	.1	
2024	NYU	**27**	**27**	**35.0**	**49.3**	**41.6**	**84.8**	**4.1**	**5.8**	**1.2**	.1	
