= Bryan Freedman =

American lawyer

- Born: Bryan Joel Freedman; Forest Hills, New York
- Education: University of California, Berkeley; McGeorge School of Law (JD)
- Occupations: Trial attorney, litigator
- Years active: 1991–present
- Children: Spencer Freedman
- Website: ftllp.com

Bryan Freedman is an American entertainment lawyer and litigator. He is co-founder of the Los Angeles-based law firm Liner Freedman Taitelman + Cooley LLP.

Freedman is known for his aggressive litigation style. He has represented many high-profile defendants in the entertainment industry, including actors, sportspeople as well as motion pictures and television companies, among others.

== Early life and education ==
Freedman was born in Forest Hills, New York, the son of a pathologist. He relocated frequently during his youth due to his father's changing employment. He attended the University of California, Berkeley, and later McGeorge School of Law, where he earned his Juris Doctor.

== Career ==
=== 1991–2015: Early career, Spencer, and Sony cases ===
After graduating from law school, Freedman was admitted to the California State Bar in 1991. In 1997 Freedman co-founded Bryan Freedman Freedman + Taitelman, LLP with Michael Taitelman whom he met while attending law school at McGeorge. The law firm mostly represents clients from the entertainment industry. He developed an expertise in talent agency regulations and subsequently served as the primary attorney for the United Talent Agency, which led to his involvement in further entertainment-related litigation.

In 2011, Freedman represented fashion designer Dawn Simorangkir in a defamation action concerning statements posted by Courtney Love on Twitter and Myspace. Love agreed to pay $430,000 plus interest in a public settlement.

In August 2014, Freedman represented Octavia Spencer who sued Sensa Products for $700,000 after the company terminated her contract prematurely. Sensa allegedly took issue with Spencer's use of the hashtag "#spon" to identify sponsored tweets promoting their products. She argued that her contract did not require her to avoid using such hashtags, and the court ruled in her favor, with Judge Michael Stern ordering Sensa to pay Spencer $940,000.

In November 2014, a hacker group called "Guardians of Peace" leaked confidential data from Sony Pictures Entertainment, including employee information, emails, salaries, and unreleased films. The group demanded that Sony withdraw the upcoming film The Interview, which depicted a plot to assassinate North Korean leader Kim Jong-un, and threatened terrorist attacks at cinemas screening the film. Sony canceled the film's formal premiere and mainstream release, opting for a limited digital and theatrical release instead. Freedman represented several parties in the lawsuit against Sony which was eventually settled for $8 million.

=== 2016–2020: Kelly, Michael Jackson Estate, and Union cases ===
In 2018, Megyn Kelly was fired from NBC after a Halloween segment on her talk show where she questioned why blackface is considered racist, stating that it was acceptable during her youth if someone was portraying a character. This led to accusations that Kelly was defending the use of blackface in Halloween costumes. Despite issuing a public apology, her show was canceled, and she was terminated from NBC. Freedman represented Kelly and said that NBC allowed false rumors to circulate and argued that Kelly should receive the remainder of her contract. Ultimately, NBC agreed to pay out the full remainder of her contract.

In February 2019, Freedman represented Michael Jackson Estate who filed a lawsuit against HBO over Leaving Neverland. After Michael Jackson's death, his estate faced debt-related issues. Freedman, alongside Howard Weitzman and executors John Branca and John McClain, worked to resolve a reported $500 million in estate debt and a $100 million lawsuit against HBO related to the documentary Leaving Neverland, which detailed allegations of child sexual abuse against Jackson.

In May 2020, Freedman represented Gabrielle Union who filed a discrimination lawsuit against the producers of America's Got Talent, alleging racism and prejudice after her contract as a judge was not renewed for the fourteenth season in 2019, following her complaints about racist incidents on set. Fellow judge Julianne Hough's contract was also not renewed. Freedman managed a settlement for Union with an "amicable resolution", although the terms of the agreement were not disclosed publicly.

=== 2021–present: Harrison, Wayfarer and other cases ===
In 2021, Chris Harrison hired Freedman to negotiate his exit from The Bachelor, when he faced backlash after defending Rachael Kirkconnell, a contestant on the show, during an interview with former Bachelorette Rachel Lindsay. Kirkconnell had attended an "Old South" ball in 2018, hosted by Kappa Alpha Order (KA). With the help of Freedman, Harrison received an eight-figure payout, later reported to be $10 million, from the network.

In February 2022, Miles Cooley joined Freedman + Taitelman LLP as a partner and later in September 2023 it was renamed as Freedman Taitelman + Cooley.

In 2023, Freedman and Mark Geragos joined Bethenny Frankel in an effort to investigate working conditions in reality television and seek stronger contractual and union protection for performers. SAG-AFTRA publicly supported the initiative.

In December 2024, Freedman began representing actor-director Justin Baldoni, Wayfarer Studios financier Steve Sarowitz, Wayfarer president Jamey Heath, and publicists Jennifer Abel and Melissa Nathan following allegations by Blake Lively that Baldoni and others associated with the film had engaged in sexual harassment, retaliation, and a coordinated campaign to damage her reputation. In December 2024, Freedman filed a $250 million libel lawsuit against The New York Times, alleging that its reporting on Lively's allegations relied on selectively presented communications and omitted evidence that contradicted her claims. In January 2025, he represented Baldoni and other plaintiffs in a lawsuit against Lively, Ryan Reynolds (Lively's husband), Leslie Sloane (Lively's PR representative), and others seeking $400 million in damages, alleging extortion, defamation, and breach of contract. Later that month, Lively and Reynolds sought a gag order against Freedman. Baldoni's lawsuit against Lively, Reynolds, Sloane and The New York Times was dismissed in June 2025. In April 2026, 10 out of 13 of Lively's claims were dismissed by the judge, including her sexual harassment allegations against Baldoni. Her remaining claims were allowed to proceed. In May 2026, two weeks before trial, the parties settled. A court filing confirmed the settlement involved no financial payout.

In July 2025, Park County, the company of South Park creators Trey Parker and Matt Stone, retained Freedman and Stuart Liner to prepare potential litigation during stalled negotiations with Paramount and Skydance. The parties subsequently reached a five-year streaming-rights agreement valued at $1.5 billion.

In October 2026, the New York Times published an investigation into Freedman, a publicist, Melissa Nathan; and website operator Jed Wallace, showing pervasive links between them and smear websites designed to damage the reputations of individuals involved in disputes with Freedman's clients. The individuals smeared by the anonymous websites (including Lively and Amanda Ghost) were accused of fabricated crimes, such as the sale of ketamine, sex trafficking and prostitution. Freedman had denied the claims, and the New York Times has stood by its reporting.

== Personal life ==
Freedman lives with his family in the Los Angeles metropolitan area. His son Spencer Freedman is a college basketball player who played for the Harvard Crimson of the Ivy League, and currently plays for the NYU Violets of the University Athletic Association.
