= 2019–20 Columbia Lions men's basketball team =

American college basketball season

2019–20 Columbia Lions men's basketball
- Conference: Ivy League
- Record: 6–24 (1–13 Ivy)
- Head coach: Jim Engles (4th season)
- Assistant coaches: Marlon Sears; Jared Czech; Justin Levine; Jesse Agel
- Home arena: Levien Gymnasium

2019–20 Ivy League men's basketball standings
	Conf.				Overall
Team	W		L	PCT	W		L	PCT
x-Yale	11	–	3	.786	23	–	7	.767
Harvard	10	–	4	.714	21	–	8	.724
Princeton	9	–	5	.643	14	–	13	.519
Penn	8	–	6	.571	16	–	11	.593
Brown	8	–	6	.571	15	–	12	.556
Dartmouth	5	–	9	.357	12	–	17	.414
Cornell	4	–	10	.286	7	–	20	.259
Columbia	1	–	13	.071	6	–	24	.200
x – Ivy League champions Ivy League tournament canceled due to COVID-19 pandemic

The 2019–20 Columbia Lions men's basketball team represented Columbia University in the 2019–20 NCAA Division I men's basketball season. The Lions, led by fourth-year head coach Jim Engles, played their home games at Levien Gymnasium in New York City as members of the Ivy League. They finished the season 6–24, 1–13 in Ivy League play to finish in last place. They failed to qualify for the Ivy League tournament, although the tournament was ultimately cancelled due to the COVID-19 pandemic.

== Previous season ==
The Lions finished the 2018–19 season 10–18 overall, 5–9 in Ivy League play, to finish in seventh place. In turn, they failed to qualify for the Ivy League tournament.

In May 2019, assistant Kenny Blakeney was hired as the new head coach at Howard.

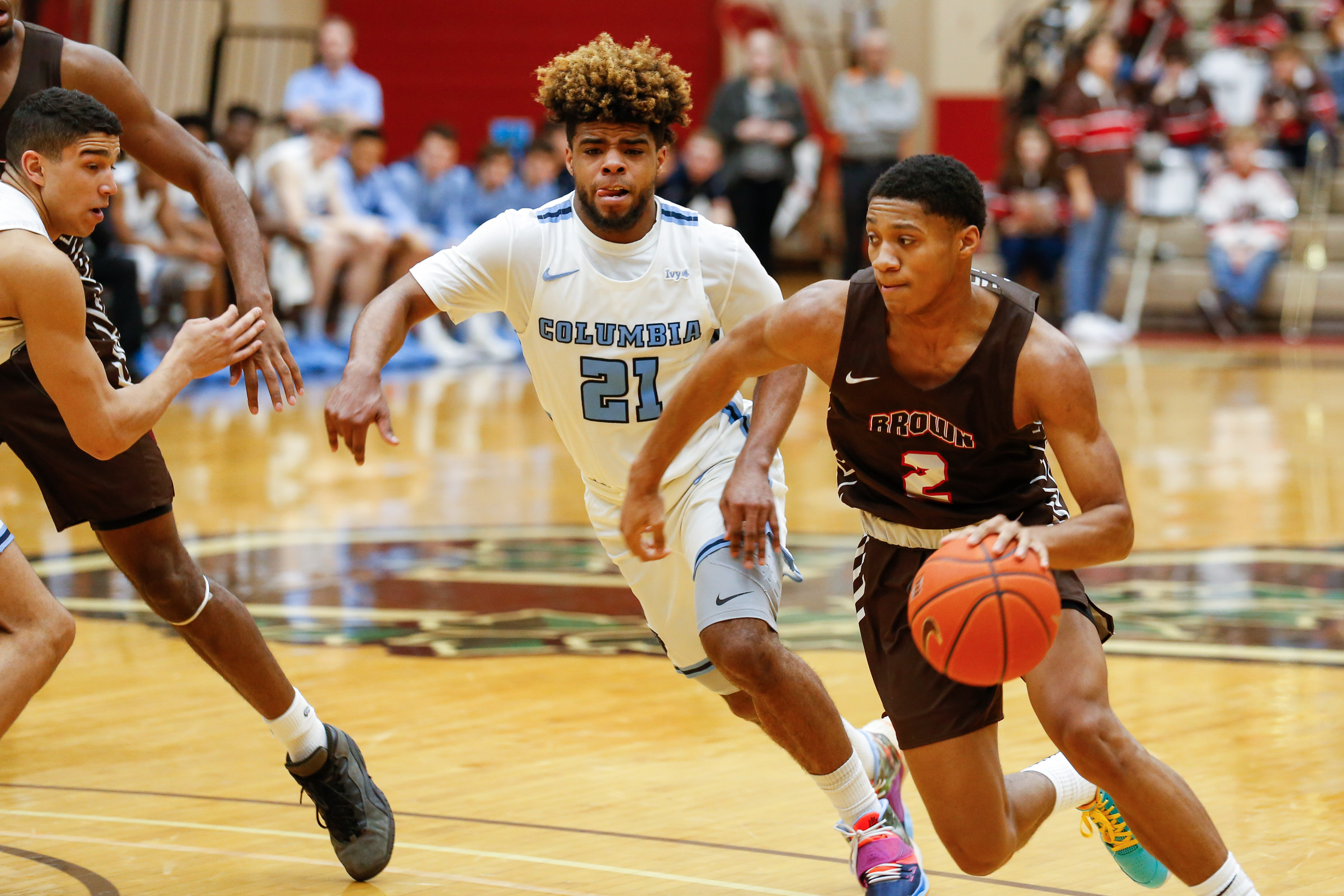
Columbia #21 Mike Smith, behind Brown #2 Brandon Anderson with the ball. Brown beat Columbia 72-66, February 1, 2020

== Roster ==
2019–20 Columbia Lions men's basketball team
Players
Coaches

Pos.	#	Name	Height	Weight	Year	Hometown
G	1	Luke Bolster	6 ft 0 in (1.83 m)	175 lb (79 kg)	Jr	New York, New York
G	2	Ben Milstein	5 ft 10 in (1.78 m)	168 lb (76 kg)	So	Boca Raton, Florida
G	4	Jack Forrest	6 ft 5 in (1.96 m)	200 lb (91 kg)	Fr	Bala Cynwyd, Pennsylvania
F	5	Emmanuel Onuama	6 ft 8 in (2.03 m)	216 lb (98 kg)	Fr	Aguleri, Nigeria
F	10	Asa Shannon	6 ft 6 in (1.98 m)	195 lb (88 kg)	Fr	Hyattsville, Maryland
G/F	12	Cameron Shockley-Okeke	6 ft 6 in (1.98 m)	190 lb (86 kg)	Fr	Norwalk, Connecticut
F	13	Randy Brumant	6 ft 7 in (2.01 m)	200 lb (91 kg)	Jr	Houston, Texas
G	14	Eddie Turner III	6 ft 2 in (1.88 m)	160 lb (73 kg)	Fr	Seattle, Washington
G	15	Gabe Stefanini	6 ft 3 in (1.91 m)	210 lb (95 kg)	Jr	Bologna, Italy
G	20	Jake Killingsworth	6 ft 5 in (1.96 m)	205 lb (93 kg)	Sr	San Carlos, California
G	21	Mike Smith	5 ft 11 in (1.8 m)	180 lb (82 kg)	Sr	Burr Ridge, Illinois
F	24	Ike Nweke	6 ft 7 in (2.01 m)	240 lb (109 kg)	So	Woodbine, Maryland
G	25	Jake Klores	6 ft 0 in (1.83 m)	165 lb (75 kg)	Jr	New York, New York
G	32	Maka Ellis	6 ft 5 in (1.96 m)	190 lb (86 kg)	So	Las Vegas, Nevada
G	33	Tai Bibbs	6 ft 3 in (1.91 m)	177 lb (80 kg)	Jr	Chicago, Illinois
F/C	50	Joseph Smoyer	6 ft 11 in (2.11 m)	230 lb (104 kg)	Jr	Portland, Oregon

Head coach

- Jim Engles (Dickinson)

Assistant coach(es)

- Marlon Sears (Newman)
- Jared Czech (Manhattanville)
- Justin Levine (Ithaca)
- Jesse Agel (Vermont)

Legend

- (C) Team captain
- (S) Suspended
- (I) Ineligible
- (W) Walk-on
- Injured
- Current redshirt

Roster
Last update: November 4, 2019

== Schedule and results ==
Date time, TV	Opponent	Result	Record	Site (attendance) city, state
Non-conference regular season
November 5, 2019*; 8:00 pm, PLN	at Lafayette	L 63–65	0–1	Kirby Sports Center (1,476); Easton, PA
November 10, 2019*; 2:00 pm, ACCN	at Wake Forest	L 63–65	0–2	LJVM Coliseum (4,451); Winston-Salem, NC
November 13, 2019*; 7:00 pm, ESPN+	Binghamton	W 75–63	1–2	Levien Gymnasium (801); New York, NY
November 16, 2019*; 12:00 pm, ACCN	at No. 9 Virginia; Hall of Fame Tip Off campus game	L 42–60	1–3	John Paul Jones Arena (13,736); Charlottesville, VA
November 20, 2019*; 6:30 pm, FS1	at St. John's; Hall of Fame Tip Off campus game	L 63–82	1–4	Carnesecca Arena (3,419); Queens, NY
November 23, 2019*; 5:00 pm, ESPN3	vs. Rider; Hall of Fame Tip Off Springfield semifinals	L 63–87	1–5	Mohegan Sun Arena; Uncasville, CT
November 24, 2019*; 6:00 pm, ESPN3	vs. Central Connecticut; Hall of Fame Tip Off Springfield consolation	L 52–82	2–5	Mohegan Sun Arena; Uncasville, CT
November 30, 2019*; 4:00 pm, ESPN+	Lehigh	W 68–64	3–5	Levien Gymnasium (1,333); New York, NY
December 2, 2019*; 7:00 pm, FloSports	at Delaware	W 84–76	3–6	Bob Carpenter Center (2,142); Newark, DE
December 6, 2019*; 7:00 pm, NEC Front Row	at Bryant	W 67–65	3–7	Chace Athletic Center (1,438); Smithfield, RI
December 9, 2019*; 7:00 pm, ESPN+	at Duquesne	W 90–54	3–8	Kerr Fitness Center (1,189); McCandless, PA
December 22, 2019*; 12:00 pm, PLN	at Colgate	L 71–89	3–9	Cotterell Court (741); Hamilton, NY
December 28, 2019*; 2:00 pm, ESPN+	Marist	W 69–54	4–9	Levien Gymnasium (1,295); New York, NY
December 30, 2019*; 7:00 pm, ESPN+	Albany	L 66–67	4–10	Levien Gymnasium (1,395); New York, NY
January 2, 2020*; 7:00 pm, ESPN+	at Maine	L 72–75 ^{OT}	4–11	Cross Insurance Center (682); Bangor, ME
January 9, 2020*; 7:00 pm, ESPN+	Mount Saint Vincent	W 86–56	5–11	Levien Gymnasium (555); New York, NY
Ivy League regular season
January 18, 2020; 7:00 pm, ESPN+	Cornell	W 75–61	6–11 (1–0)	Levien Gymnasium (1,823); New York, NY
January 25, 2020; 4:00 pm, ESPN+	at Cornell	L 50–62	6–12 (1–1)	Newman Arena (2,416); Ithaca, NY
January 31, 2020; 7:00 pm, ESPN+	at Yale	L 62–93	6–13 (1–2)	John J. Lee Amphitheater (1,594); New Haven, CT
February 1, 2020; 6:00 pm, ESPN+	at Brown	L 66–72	6–14 (1–3)	Pizzitola Sports Center (1,384); Providence, RI
February 8, 2020; 2:00 pm, ESPN+	Penn	L 67–76	6–15 (1–4)	Levien Gymnasium (1,855); New York, NY
February 9, 2020; 2:00 pm, SNY	Princeton	L 74–81	6–16 (1–5)	Levien Gymnasium (1,565); New York, NY
February 14, 2020; 7:00 pm, ESPN+	at Dartmouth	L 63–65	6–17 (1–6)	Leede Arena (633); Hanover, NH
February 15, 2020; 7:00 pm, ESPN+	at Harvard	L 73–77 ^{2OT}	6–18 (1–7)	Lavietes Pavilion (1,636); Boston, MA
February 21, 2020; 7:00 pm, ESPN+	Brown	L 66–72	6–19 (1–8)	Levien Gymnasium (1,357); New York, NY
February 22, 2020; 7:00 pm, SNY	Yale	L 65–83	6–20 (1–9)	Levien Gymnasium (2,065); New York, NY
February 28, 2020; 7:00 pm, ESPNews	Harvard	L 69–77	6–21 (1–10)	Levien Gymnasium (2,307); New York, NY
February 29, 2020; 7:00 pm, SNY	Dartmouth	L 57–76	6–22 (1–11)	Levien Gymnasium (1,492); New York, NY
March 6, 2020; 7:00 pm, ESPN+	at Princeton	L 58–81	6–23 (1–12)	Jadwin Gymnasium (1,939); Princeton, NJ
March 7, 2020; 6:00 pm, ESPN+	at Penn	L 65–85	6–24 (1–13)	The Palestra (3,343); Philadelphia, PA
*Non-conference game. ^{#}Rankings from AP Poll. (#) Tournament seedings in parentheses. All times are in Eastern.

== See also ==
- 2019–20 Columbia Lions women's basketball team
