= Jim Engles =

American basketball coach (born 1968)

Current position
- Title: Director of Golf
- Team: Wagner Seahawks

Biographical details
- Born: August 19, 1968 (age 58); Staten Island, New York, U.S.

Playing career
- 1986–1990: Dickinson

Coaching career (HC unless noted)

Basketball
- 1991–1997: Wagner (assistant)
- 1997–2003: Rider (assistant)
- 2003–2008: Columbia (assistant)
- 2008–2016: NJIT
- 2016–2025: Columbia

Golf
- 2026–present: Wagner (Director of Golf)

Head coaching record
- Overall: 182–289 182–289 (.386) (basketball)
- Tournaments: 6–2 (CIT)

Accomplishments and honors

Championships
- Great West regular season (2013)

Awards
- Great West Coach of the Year (2013)

Jim Engles (born August 18, 1968) is an American college basketball coach and the former coach of the Columbia Lions men's basketball team. He has also been the head men's basketball coach at the New Jersey Institute of Technology (NJIT). He replaced Jim Casciano. In Engles' first season (2008), the NJIT Highlanders snapped their Division I-record 51-game losing streak with a win over Bryant. Under Engles, NJIT reached the CIT semifinals in both 2015 and 2016. Engles had been an assistant coach at Columbia before taking over as head coach at NJIT.

On August 19, 2026, Engles was named the Director of Golf at Wagner.

== Head coaching record ==
Record table
Season	Team	Overall	Conference	Standing	Postseason
NJIT Highlanders (NCAA Division I independent) (2008–2009)
2008–09	NJIT	1–30			
NJIT Highlanders (Great West Conference) (2009–2013)
2009–10	NJIT	10–21	4–8	T–5th	
2010–11	NJIT	15–15	9–3	2nd	
2011–12	NJIT	15–17	5–5	T–3rd	
2012–13	NJIT	16–13	6–2	1st	
NJIT Highlanders (NCAA Division I independent) (2013–2015)
2013–14	NJIT	13–16			
2014–15	NJIT	21–12			CIT Semifinals
NJIT Highlanders (Atlantic Sun Conference) (2015–2016)
2015–16	NJIT	20–15	8–6	T–2nd	CIT Semifinals
NJIT:		111–139 (.444)	32–24 (.571)		
Columbia Lions (Ivy League) (2016–2025)
2016–17	Columbia	11–16	5–9	5th	
2017–18	Columbia	8–19	5–9	T–5th	
2018–19	Columbia	10–18	5–9	7th	
2019–20	Columbia	6–24	1–13	8th	
2020–21	Columbia	Season Canceled			
2021–22	Columbia	4–22	1–13	8th	
2022–23	Columbia	7–22	2–12	8th	
2023–24	Columbia	13–14	4–10	6th	
2024–25	Columbia	12–15	1–13	8th	
Columbia:		71–150 (.321)	24–88 (.214)		
Total:		182–289 (.386)			
National champion Postseason invitational champion Conference regular season champion Conference regular season and conference tournament champion Division regular season champion Division regular season and conference tournament champion Conference tournament champion
